= 2024–25 Nottingham Forest W.F.C. season =

Nottingham Forest
2024–25 season
- Owner: Evangelos Marinakis
- Chairman: Tom Cartledge (until 1 October); Nicholas Randall KC (from 1 October)
- Head Coach: Carly Davies
- Stadium: City Ground, West Bridgford; Grange Park, Long Eaton
- FA WNL Northern Premier Division: 1st
- Women's FA Cup: 4th Round
- FA WNL Cup: Winners
- Top goalscorer: League: Melissa Johnson (21); All: Melissa Johnson (27); Charlie Wellings (27)
- Highest home attendance: 3,396 v Derby County; 16 March 2025 (FA WNL Northern Premier Division)
- Lowest home attendance: 223 v Peterborough United; 20 October 2024 (FA WNL Cup)
- Average home league attendance: 1492
- Biggest win: 19 – 0 v Long Itchington (Away); 01 December 2024 (Women's FA Cup)
- Biggest defeat: 0 – 1 v Newcastle United (Away); 12 January 2025 (Women's FA Cup)
Home colours	Away colours	Third colours

In 2024–25 Nottingham Forest were the FA Women's National League Northern Premier Division champions and went undefeated in the competition for the whole season. They gained promotion to the Women's Super League 2.

Forest also won the FA Women's National League Cup, beating Stoke City 3-1 in the final.

This was Forest's seventh consecutive season in the FA Women's National League Northern Premier Division, which stands at level three of the women's football league pyramid.

On 9 July 2024 it was announced that Nottingham Forest Women will become a full-time professional football club from the start of the 2025/26 season and that for the 2024/25 football season the first team will comprise 18 full-time professional players and a small number of part-time players. It was also announced that the 2024/25 season will be the first season where Nottingham Forest Women play all of their home matches at the City Ground.

== Squad information ==
=== First team squad ===
As of 3 February 2025

No.	Name	Nat.	Date of birth (age)	Since	Signed from
Goalkeepers
1	Emily Batty	(England)	2 November 1998 (age 28)	18 July 2021	(England) Sheffield United
29	Georgie Ferguson	(England)	29 October 2002 (age 24)	11 August 2024	(England) Birmingham City
38	Holly Mears	(England)	16 January 2006 (age 20)	15 August 2024	(England) Leicester City
Defenders
2	Lyndsey Harkin	(England)	30 August 1991 (age 35)	1 February 2016	(England) Doncaster Rovers Belles
3	Nat Johnson	(Northern Ireland)	12 November 1993 (age 32)	10 August 2023	(England) Lewes
5	Naomi Bedeau	(England)	-	20 July 2024	(England) Newcastle United
6	Jessica Hennessy	(Republic of Ireland)	1 October 2001 (age 25)	13 September 2024	(Republic of Ireland) Shamrock Rovers
16	Mollie Green	(England)	4 August 1997 (age 29)	5 August 2023	(England) Birmingham City
18	Caragh Hamilton	(Northern Ireland)	18 October 1996 (age 30)	9 August 2024	(England) Lewes
Midfielders
4	Kate Longhurst	(England)	2 May 1989 (age 37)	22 July 2024	(England) Charlton Athletic
8	Amy Sims	(England)	14 April 1999 (age 27)	25 June 2024	(England) Derby County
10	Holly Manders	(England)	28 April 2001 (age 25)	2 August 2023	(England) Sunderland
15	Hollie Olding	(England)	3 January 1999 (age 27)	23 August 2024	(England) Lewes
17	Freya Thomas	(England)	28 October 2001 (age 25)	7 August 2023	(England) Coventry United
20	Millie Chandarana	(England)	11 March 1997 (age 29)	17 July 2024	(England) Blackburn Rovers
23	Megan Bell	(Northern Ireland)	17 April 2001 (age 25)	30 January 2025	(Scotland) Rangers
25	Alice Keitley	(England)	4 July 2003 (age 23)	7 August 2024	(England) Aston Villa
Forwards
7	Sophie Domingo	(England)	7 January 2000 (age 26)	1 July 2022	(England) Derby County
9	Melissa Johnson	(Jamaica)	11 August 1991 (age 35)	15 July 2024	(England) Charlton Athletic
11	Bridget Galloway	(England)	19 July 1999 (age 27)	6 August 2024	(England) Newcastle United
12	Holly Turner	(England)	8 September 2000 (age 26)	31 January 2025	(England) Hashtag United
14	Charlie Wellings	(England)	18 May 1998 (age 28)	19 July 2024	(England) Reading
19	Sophie Haywood	(England)	10 January 1996 (age 30)	30 January 2025	(England) Newcastle United
22	Casey Howe	(Northern Ireland)	2 September 2002 (age 24)	30 August 2024	(Republic of Ireland) Athlone Town
26	Katie Dungate	(England)	26 August 2004 (age 22)	16 August 2024	(England) Birmingham City

== Squad Changes ==
=== Transfers In ===
Date	Pos.	Player	From	Fee	Ref.
25 June 2024	MF	Amy Sims	Derby County	Free agent	
15 July 2024	FW	Melissa Johnson	Charlton Athletic	Free agent	
17 July 2024	MF	Millie Chandarana	Blackburn Rovers	Free agent	
19 July 2024	FW	Charlie Wellings	Reading	Free agent	
20 July 2024	DF	Naomi Bedeau	Newcastle United	Free agent	
22 July 2024	MF	Kate Longhurst	Charlton Athletic	Free agent	
6 August 2024	FW	Bridget Galloway	Newcastle United	Free agent	
7 August 2024	MF	Alice Keitley	Aston Villa	Free agent	
9 August 2024	DF	Caragh Hamilton	Lewes	Free agent	
11 August 2024	GK	Georgie Ferguson	Birmingham City	Free agent	
15 August 2024	GK	Holly Mears	Leicester City	Free agent	
23 August 2024	MF	Hollie Olding	Lewes	Free agent	
30 August 2024	FW	Casey Howe	Athlone Town	Free agent	
13 September 2024	DF	Jessica Hennessy	Shamrock Rovers	Free agent	
30 January 2025	MF	Megan Bell	Rangers	Free agent	
31 January 2025	FW	Holly Turner	Hashtag United	Free agent	

=== Transfers Out ===
Date	Pos.	Player	To	Fee	Ref.
1 August 2024	FW	Charlotte Greengrass	Wolverhampton Wanderers	Free agent	
24 August 2024	MF	Becky Anderson	Wolverhampton Wanderers	Free agent	
30 August 2024	DF	Ella Haughey	West Bromwich Albion	Free agent	

=== Loans In ===
Date from	Pos.	Player	From	Duration	Ref.
16 August 2024	MF	Katie Dungate	Birmingham City	Season-long loan	
30 January 2025	FW	Sophie Haywood	Newcastle United	Six-month loan	

=== Loans Out ===
Date from	Pos.	Player	To	Duration	Ref.

=== Released ===
Date	Pos.	Player	Subsequent club	Date signed	Ref.
30 June 2024	GK	Aja Aguirre			
30 June 2024	DF	Olivia Cook	Stoke City	2 August 2024	
30 June 2024	DF	Chloe Dixon	Leeds United	11 July 2025	
30 June 2024	MF	Lauren McMurchie	Retired		
30 June 2024	FW	Mai Moncaster	Rugby Borough	11 July 2024	
30 June 2024	DF	Laura-Jayne O'Neill	Retired		
30 June 2024	MF	Niamh Reynolds	Peterborough United	28 June 2024	
8 October 2024	DF	Hayley James	Peterborough United	11 October 2024	

=== New contracts ===
Date	Pos.	Player	Contract length	Ref.
20 June 2024	DF	Nat Johnson	Two years	
21 June 2024	MF	Freya Thomas	Two years	
28 June 2024	GK	Emily Batty	One year	
28 June 2024	MF	Mollie Green	One year	
11 July 2024	FW	Sophie Domingo	One year	
11 July 2024	MF	Holly Manders	One year	
13 August 2024	DF	Hayley James	One year	
14 August 2024	DF	Lyndsey Harkin	One year	

== Pre-season and friendlies ==
Win Draw Loss Fixtures

21 July 2024 Friendly	Watford	2 - 3	Nottingham Forest
14:00 BST	Goal	Report	Melissa Johnson; Charlie Wellings; Mollie Green

28 July 2024 Friendly	Nottingham Forest	v	Blackburn Rovers
14:00 BST
Note: Behind closed doors

04 August 2024 Friendly	Charlton Athletic	2 - 1	Nottingham Forest
13:00 BST	Melisa Filis; Princess Ademiluyi	Report	Jodie Hutton (o.g.)

08 August 2024 Friendly	Nottingham Forest	v	West Bromwich Albion
19:45 BST
Note: Behind closed doors

11 August 2024 Friendly	Nottingham Forest	2 - 0	Bristol City	Long Eaton
14:00 BST	Melissa Johnson; Charlie Wellings			Stadium: Grange Park

== Competitions ==
=== Overall record ===
Competition	First match	Last match	Starting round	Final position	Record							
Competition	First match	Last match	Starting round	Final position	Pld	W	D	L	GF	GA	GD	Win %
WNL Northern Premier Division	18 August 2024	27 April 2025	Matchday 1	Winners	22	18	4	0	79	8	+71	81.82
Women's FA Cup	3 November 2024	13 January 2025	First round	Fourth round	4	3	0	1	23	2	+21	75.00
WNL Cup	29 August 2024	22 March 2025	Determining round	Winners	6	6	0	0	19	2	+17	100.00
Total					32	27	4	1	121	12	+109	84.38

Source: Soccerway

=== FA Women's National League Northern Premier Division ===
==== Results summary ====
Overall								Home						Away					
Pld	W	D	L	GF	GA	GD	Pts	W	D	L	GF	GA	GD	W	D	L	GF	GA	GD
22	18	4	0	79	8	+71	58	8	3	0	45	5	+40	10	1	0	34	3	+31

Source: Soccerway

==== Results by round ====
Round	1	2	3	4	5	6	7	8	9	10	11	12	13	14	15	16	17	18	19	20	21	22
Ground	A	H	A	H	H	A	A	H	A	A	H	A	A	H	H	H	A	H	H	A	A	H
Result	W	W	W	W	D	W	D	W	W	W	W	W	W	W	W	D	W	W	D	W	W	W
Position	5	3	3	1	1	1	1	1	1	2	1	1	1	1	1	1	1	1	1	1	1	1
Points	3	6	9	12	13	16	17	20	23	26	29	32	35	38	41	42	45	48	49	52	55	58

Source: Soccerway
A = Away; H = Home; W = Win; D = Draw; L = Loss

==== Matches ====
Win Draw Loss Fixtures

18 August 2024 1	Stoke City	0 - 3	Nottingham Forest	Stoke-on-Trent
14:00 BST	Jessica Reavill (yellow card) 37'; Arabella Suttie (yellow card) 58'	Report	Nat Johnson 54', 71'; Charlie Wellings 78' (pen.)	Stadium: Bet365 Stadium; Attendance: 556

25 August 2024 2	Nottingham Forest	7 - 0	Sporting Khalsa	West Bridgford
14:00 BST	Sophie Domingo 18' (yellow card) 73'; Freya Thomas 30'; Lyndsey Harkin (yellow card) 37'; 50' (o.g.); Mollie Green 61'; Holly Manders 69'; Charlie Wellings 71'; Bridget Galloway 88' (yellow card) 85'	Report	Laura Smith (yellow card) 42'	Stadium: City Ground; Attendance: 1211

01 September 2024 3	Wolverhampton Wanderers	1 - 6	Nottingham Forest	Telford
14:00 BST	Tammi George (yellow card) 39'; Summer Holmes (yellow card) 55'; Amber Hughes 56'	Report	Kate Longhurst 24' (yellow card) 39'; Melissa Johnson 34', 36', 52'; Sophie Domingo 41'; Millie Chandarana (yellow card) 66'; Hollie Olding 85'	Stadium: New Bucks Head; Attendance: 449

08 September 2024 4	Nottingham Forest	9 - 0	Stourbridge	West Bridgford
14:00 BST	Charlie Wellings 14'; Nat Johnson 30'; Mollie Green 37'; Sophie Domingo 47', 56', 85'; Holly Manders 71'; Melissa Johnson 83', 88'	Report		Stadium: City Ground; Attendance: 982

15 September 2024 5	Nottingham Forest	1 - 1	Burnley	West Bridgford
14:00 BST	Melissa Johnson 31'	Report	Reanna Blades 80'	Stadium: City Ground; Attendance: 1077

22 September 2024 6	Hull City	0 - 4	Nottingham Forest	Barton-upon-Humber
14:00 BST	Ellie Tanser (yellow card) 42'	Report	Charlie Wellings 10', 50'; Melissa Johnson 28', 33'	Stadium: Marsh Lane; Attendance: 303

25 September 2024 7	Rugby Borough	1 - 1	Nottingham Forest	Rugby
20:00 BST	Katy Norris 5'; Angelina Nixon (yellow card) 15'; Ebony Wiseman (yellow card) 39'	Report	Mollie Green 79' (pen.)	Stadium: Kilsby Lane; Attendance: 349

06 October 2024 8	Nottingham Forest	8 - 0	Halifax	West Bridgford
14:00 BST	Hollie Olding 14'; Casey Howe 19'; 42' (o.g.); Charlie Wellings 53'; Sophie Domingo 67', 74'; Millie Chandarana 69'; Bridget Galloway 87'; Nat Johnson (yellow card); Amy Sims (yellow card)	Report		Stadium: City Ground; Attendance: 1001

13 October 2024 9	Derby County	1 - 2	Nottingham Forest	Mickleover
14:00 BST	Daisy Burt 42' (pen.)	Report	Charlie Wellings 82', 90+2' (pen.)	Stadium: Mickleover Sports Club; Attendance: 1225

10 November 2024 11	West Bromwich Albion	0 - 2	Nottingham Forest	Redditch
15:00 GMT		Report	Melissa Johnson 15'; Mollie Green 86'; Emily Batty (yellow card); Sophie Domingo (yellow card); Kate Longhurst (yellow card)	Stadium: Valley Stadium; Attendance: 107

17 November 2024 12	Nottingham Forest	4 - 0	Stoke City	West Bridgford
14:00 GMT	Kate Longhurst 16'; Millie Chandarana 22'; Hollie Olding 53'; Freya Thomas 75'	Report	Jessica Reavill (yellow card) 35'; Millie Grace Ravening (yellow card) 82'	Stadium: City Ground; Attendance: 1910

19 January 2025 13	Sporting Khalsa	0 - 1	Nottingham Forest	Willenhall
14:00 GMT	Layla Kennerley (yellow card) 50'	Report	Katie Dungate 74'	Stadium: Guardian Warehousing Arena; Attendance: 130
Note: Match postponed from 15 December 2024

02 February 2025 16	Halifax	0 - 2	Nottingham Forest	Bradford
15:00 GMT	Sienna Limbert (yellow card) 49'	Report	Millie Chandarana 12'; Charlie Wellings 43'	Stadium: Horsfall Stadium; Attendance: 143

09 February 2025 10	Nottingham Forest	4 - 0	Liverpool Feds	West Bridgford
14:00 GMT	Charlie Wellings 35' (pen.); Millie Chandarana 42'; Melissa Johnson 53', 85'	Report		Stadium: City Ground; Attendance: 895
Note: Match postponed from 27 October 2024

13 February 2025 17	Nottingham Forest	1 - 0	Rugby Borough	West Bridgford
19:45 GMT	Melissa Johnson 87'	Report	Alanah Mann (yellow card) 56'	Stadium: City Ground; Attendance: 923

16 February 2025 14	Nottingham Forest	1 - 1	Wolverhampton Wanderers	West Bridgford
14:00 GMT	Melissa Johnson 19'; Nat Johnson (yellow card) 55'	Report	Charlotte Greengrass 46'; Anna Morphet (yellow card) 81'	Stadium: City Ground; Attendance: 1677
Note: Match postponed from 05 January 2025

09 March 2025 18	Burnley	0 - 2	Nottingham Forest	Leyland
14:00 GMT		Report	Sophie Domingo 29'; Freya Thomas 36'	Stadium: County Ground

16 March 2025 19	Nottingham Forest	2 - 0	Derby County	West Bridgford
14:00 GMT	Charlie Wellings 34' (pen.), 56'	Report		Stadium: City Ground; Attendance: 3396
Note: Match postponed from 23 March 2025

30 March 2025 20	Nottingham Forest	1 - 1	Hull City	West Bridgford
14:00 BST	Holly Manders 11'	Report	Ellie Tanser 84'; Izzy Gigg (yellow card)	Stadium: City Ground; Attendance: 1425

13 April 2025 21	Liverpool Feds	0 - 7	Nottingham Forest	Aigburth
14:00 BST		Report	Nat Johnson 26'; Melissa Johnson 31', 40', 49', 70'; Charlie Wellings 37', 58'	Stadium: Jericho Lane Football Hub; Attendance: 210

20 April 2025 15	Stourbridge	0 - 4	Nottingham Forest	Amblecote
14:00 BST		Report	Charlie Wellings 19'; Holly Manders 29'; Hollie Olding 39'; Sophie Domingo 62'	Stadium: War Memorial Athletic Ground; Attendance: 265
Note: Match postponed from 12 January 2025. Match postponed from 2 March 2025

27 April 2025 22	Nottingham Forest	7 - 2	West Bromwich Albion	West Bridgford
14:00 BST	Charlie Wellings 36' (pen.); Sophie Domingo 45'; Melissa Johnson 48', 57', 68', 90'; Holly Manders 61'	Report	Phoebe Warner 8'; Marli Rhodes-Andrews 71'	Stadium: City Ground; Attendance: 1918

=== Women's FA Cup ===
==== Matches ====
Win Draw Loss Fixtures

03 November 2024 1	Boldmere St. Michaels	1 - 3	Nottingham Forest	Sutton Coldfield
14:00 GMT	Lataya Bojang 60'; Jade Formaston (yellow card); Rhiannon Travers (yellow card)	Report	Melissa Johnson 20', 65'; Charlie Wellings 40'	Stadium: Boldmere Community Stadium

01 December 2024 2	Long Itchington	0 - 19	Nottingham Forest	Kenilworth
14:00 GMT		Report	Bridget Galloway 3', 18', 22', 55', 56'; Freya Thomas 5', 11', 27', 50', 52'; Sophie Domingo 9', 65'; Charlie Wellings 15', 70', 88'; Amy Sims 17'; Mollie Green 25'; Holly Manders 47'; Hollie Olding 90'	Stadium: Kenilworth Sporting Ground

08 January 2025 3	Nottingham Forest	1 - 0 (a.e.t.)	Burnley	West Bridgford
14:00 GMT	Charlie Wellings 99'; Millie Chandarana (yellow card); Kate Longhurst (yellow card); Holly Manders (yellow card)	Report		Stadium: City Ground; Attendance: 884
Note: Match postponed from 5 January 2024

12 January 2025 4	Newcastle United	1 - 0	Nottingham Forest	Newcastle upon Tyne
13:00 GMT	Jasmine McQuade 76'	Report	Millie Chandarana (yellow card) 64'; Kate Longhurst (yellow card) 90+3'	Stadium: Kingston Park; Attendance: 1445

=== FA Women's National League Cup ===
==== Matches ====
Win Draw Loss Fixtures

29 August 2024 Determining	Nottingham Forest	6 - 0	Notts County	Long Eaton
19:45 BST	Bridget Galloway 50', 77'; Nat Johnson 61'; Charlie Wellings 73'; Melissa Johnson 75'; Freya Thomas 90+1'	Report		Stadium: Grange Park; Attendance: 444

29 September 2024 1	Cheadle Town Stingers	0 - 1	Nottingham Forest	Cheadle
14:00 BST	Rachael Dunlop (yellow card)	Report	Sophie Domingo 82'; Millie Chandarana (yellow card)	Stadium: Park Road Stadium; Attendance: 177

20 October 2024 2	Nottingham Forest	6 - 0	Peterborough United	Long Eaton
14:00 BST	Charlie Wellings 11'; Melissa Johnson 42', 55'; Kate Longhurst (yellow card) 52'; Bridget Galloway 67'; Sophie Domingo 86'; Millie Chandarana 90+4'	Report	Hannah Dawbarn (yellow card) 36'; Renai Bennett (yellow card) 75'	Stadium: Grange Park; Attendance: 223

15 December 2024 Quarter-final	Middlesbrough	1 - 2	Nottingham Forest	Stockton-on-Tees
14:00 GMT	Lauren Robson 75'	Report	Charlie Wellings 15'; Hollie Olding (yellow card) 60'; Freya Thomas 74'; Bridget Galloway (yellow card)	Stadium: Bishopton Road West; Attendance: 337

26 January 2025 Semi-final	Hashtag United	0 - 1	Nottingham Forest	Aveley
15:00 GMT	Malika Gille (yellow card); Samantha Rowland (yellow card)	Report	Charlie Wellings 86' (pen.)	Stadium: Parkside; Attendance: 190

22 March 2025 Final	Nottingham Forest	3 - 1	Stoke City	Bescot
15:30 GMT	Charlie Wellings 29', 32'; Melissa Johnson 80'	Report	Tamara Wilcock 71'	Stadium: Bescot Stadium

== Statistics ==
As of 1 May 2025

=== Overall ===
No.	Pos.	Player	League				FA Cup				League Cup				Total			
No.	Pos.	Player		Goal	Yellow card	Red card		Goal	Yellow card	Red card		Goal	Yellow card	Red card		Goal	Yellow card	Red card
1	GK	Emily Batty	22	0	1	0	4	0	0	0	3	0	0	0	29	0	1	0
2	DF	Lyndsey Harkin	21 (1)	0	1	0	4	0	0	0	5 (1)	0	0	0	30 (2)	0	1	0
3	DF	Nat Johnson	21 (1)	4	2	0	2 (1)	0	0	0	3 (3)	1	0	0	26 (5)	5	2	0
4	MF	Kate Longhurst	19 (3)	2	2	0	3 (1)	0	2	0	3 (1)	0	1	0	25 (5)	2	5	0
5	DF	Naomi Bedeau	0 (3)	0	0	0	0	0	0	0	0	0	0	0	0 (3)	0	0	0
6	DF	Jessica Hennessy	0 (2)	0	0	0	1 (2)	0	0	0	1 (3)	0	0	0	2 (7)	0	0	0
7	FW	Sophie Domingo	16 (5)	10	2	0	2	2	0	0	3 (2)	2	0	0	21 (7)	14	2	0
8	MF	Amy Sims	2 (16)	0	1	0	2 (2)	1	0	0	3 (3)	0	0	0	7 (21)	1	1	0
9	FW	Melissa Johnson	19 (3)	21	0	0	3 (1)	2	0	0	4 (2)	4	0	0	26 (6)	27	0	0
10	MF	Holly Manders	5 (8)	5	0	0	1 (3)	1	1	0	1 (2)	0	0	0	7 (13)	6	1	0
11	FW	Bridget Galloway	2 (8)	2	1	0	2 (2)	5	0	0	2 (3)	3	1	0	6 (13)	10	2	0
12	FW	Holly Turner	2 (4)	0	0	0	0	0	0	0	0	0	0	0	2 (4)	0	0	0
14	FW	Charlie Wellings	21 (1)	16	0	0	4	5	1	0	5 (1)	6	0	0	30 (2)	27	1	0
15	MF	Hollie Olding	17 (3)	4	0	0	4	1	0	0	6	0	1	0	27 (3)	5	1	0
16	DF	Mollie Green	22	4	0	0	4	1	0	0	6	0	0	0	32	5	0	0
17	MF	Freya Thomas	19 (1)	3	0	0	4	5	0	0	4 (2)	2	0	0	27 (3)	10	0	0
18	DF	Caragh Hamilton	12 (6)	0	0	0	0	0	0	0	3 (1)	0	0	0	15 (7)	0	0	0
19	FW	Sophie Haywood	1 (5)	0	0	0	0	0	0	0	0	0	0	0	1 (5)	0	0	0
20	MF	Millie Chandarana	14 (6)	4	1	0	3 (1)	0	2	0	5 (1)	1	1	0	22 (8)	5	4	0
21	DF	Hayley James	0 (2)	0	0	0	0	0	0	0	1	0	0	0	1 (2)	0	0	0
22	FW	Casey Howe	4 (3)	1	0	0	0 (1)	0	0	0	2	0	0	0	6 (4)	1	0	0
23	MF	Megan Bell	1 (6)	0	0	0	0	0	0	0	0	0	0	0	1 (6)	0	0	0
25	MF	Alice Keitley	0	0	0	0	0	0	0	0	0	0	0	0	0	0	0	0
26	FW	Katie Dungate	2 (9)	1	0	0	1	0	0	0	3 (1)	0	0	0	6 (10)	1	0	0
29	GK	Georgie Ferguson	0	0	0	0	0 (1)	0	0	0	3	0	0	0	3 (1)	0	0	0
38	GK	Holly Mears	0	0	0	0	0	0	0	0	0	0	0	0	0	0	0	0

=== Goalscorers ===
Rank	No.	Pos.	Player	League	FA Cup	League Cup	Total
1	9	FW	Melissa Johnson	21	2	4	27
1	14	FW	Charlie Wellings	16	5	6	27
3	7	FW	Sophie Domingo	10	2	2	14
4	17	MF	Freya Thomas	3	5	2	10
4	11	FW	Bridget Galloway	2	5	3	10
6	10	MF	Holly Manders	5	1	0	6
7	20	MF	Millie Chandarana	4	0	1	5
7	16	DF	Mollie Green	4	1	0	5
7	3	DF	Nat Johnson	4	0	1	5
7	15	MF	Hollie Olding	4	1	0	5
11	4	MF	Kate Longhurst	2	0	0	2
12	26	MF	Katie Dungate	1	0	0	1
12	22	FW	Casey Howe	1	0	0	1
12	8	MF	Amy Sims	0	1	0	1
Own Goals				2	0	0	2
Totals				79	23	19	121

=== Assists ===
Rank	No.	Pos.	Player	League	FA Cup	League Cup	Total
1	7	FW	Sophie Domingo	11	3	0	14
2	9	FW	Melissa Johnson	5	0	3	8
2	14	FW	Charlie Wellings	8	0	0	8
4	2	DF	Lyndsey Harkin	3	0	2	5
5	17	MF	Freya Thomas	3	0	1	4
6	20	MF	Millie Chandarana	1	0	2	3
6	18	DF	Caragh Hamilton	2	0	1	3
6	22	FW	Casey Howe	2	0	1	3
6	8	MF	Amy Sims	3	0	0	3
10	26	FW	Katie Dungate	1	0	1	2
10	10	MF	Holly Manders	0	0	2	2
12	23	MF	Megan Bell	1	0	0	0
12	11	FW	Bridget Galloway	0	0	1	1
12	16	DF	Mollie Green	1	0	0	1
12	19	FW	Sophie Haywood	1	0	0	1
12	21	DF	Hayley James	0	0	1	1
12	3	DF	Nat Johnson	1	0	0	1
Totals				43	3	15	61

=== Clean sheets ===
Rank	No.	Pos.	Player	League	FA Cup	League Cup	Total
1	1	GK	Emily Batty	15	2	1	18
2	29	GK	Georgie Ferguson	0	0	3	3
Totals				15	2	4	21

=== Hat-tricks ===
Player	Against	Result	Date	Competition	Ref.
Melissa Johnson	Wolverhampton Wanderers (A)	6 – 1	1 September 2024	WNL Northern Premier Division	
Sophie Domingo	Stourbridge (H)	9 – 0	8 September 2024	WNL Northern Premier Division	
Bridget Galloway^{5}	Long Itchington (A)	19 – 0	1 December 2024	Women's FA Cup	
Freya Thomas^{5}	Long Itchington (A)	19 – 0	1 December 2024	Women's FA Cup	
Charlie Wellings	Long Itchington (A)	19 – 0	1 December 2024	Women's FA Cup	
Melissa Johnson^{4}	Liverpool Feds (A)	7 – 0	13 April 2025	WNL Northern Premier Division	
Melissa Johnson^{4}	West Bromwich Albion (H)	7 – 2	27 April 2025	WNL Northern Premier Division	

4 – denotes player scored four goals
5 – denotes player scored five goals

== Awards ==
=== E.ON Next Women’s Player of the Month ===
Awarded by an online vote of supporters on the official Nottingham Forest F.C. website.

Month	Player	Ref.
August	Sophie Domingo	
September	Melissa Johnson	
October	Charlie Wellings	
November	Millie Chandarana	
January	Emily Batty	
February	Melissa Johnson	
March	Charlie Wellings	
April	Charlie Wellings	

=== Season Awards ===
Award	Player	Ref.
Coaches’ Player of the Season	Mollie Green	
Players’ Player of the Season	Charlie Wellings	
Supporters’ Player of the Season	Charlie Wellings	
