= List of English women's football transfers summer 2025 =

The 2025 English women's football summer transfer window ran from 18 June to 4 September 2025. Players without a club could be signed at any time, clubs could sign players on loan dependent on their league's regulations, and clubs could sign a goalkeeper on an emergency loan if they had no registered senior goalkeeper available. This list includes transfers featuring at least one club from either the Women's Super League or the Women's Championship that were completed after the end of the winter 2024–25 transfer window on 30 January and before the end of the 2025 summer window.

== Transfers ==
All players and clubs without a flag are English.

Date	Name	Moving from	Moving to	Fee	Ref.
24 March 2025	(Brazil) Geyse	Manchester United	(United States) Gotham FC	Loan	
19 April 2025	Felicity Gibbons	Crystal Palace	Retired		
20 April 2025	(China) Li Mengwen	Brighton & Hove Albion	(China) Jiangsu	Free	
29 April 2025	(Republic of Ireland) Louise Quinn	Birmingham City	Retired		
2 May 2025	(Republic of Ireland) Niamh Fahey	Liverpool	Retired		
2 May 2025	Megan Beer	Sunderland	Retired		
3 May 2025	(Jamaica) Satara Murray	Sheffield United	Retired		
11 May 2025	Kate Longhurst	Nottingham Forest	Retired		
15 May 2025	(Germany) Pauline Bremer	Brighton & Hove Albion	(Germany) 1. FC Köln	Free	
15 May 2025	(Germany) Lena Petermann	Leicester City	(Germany) Werder Bremen	Free	
16 May 2025	Siobhan Wilson	Birmingham City	Retired		
24 May 2025	(Netherlands) Jill Roord	Manchester City	(Netherlands) Twente	Undisclosed	
26 May 2025	(Scotland) Rachel Corsie	Aston Villa	Retired		
5 June 2025	(Northern Ireland) Rachel Furness	Newcastle United	Retired		
6 June 2025	(Norway) Guro Bergsvand	Brighton & Hove Albion	(Germany) VfL Wolfsburg	Free	
10 June 2025	(Switzerland) Livia Peng	(Germany) Werder Bremen	Chelsea	Undisclosed	
11 June 2025	(Germany) Mara Alber	(Germany) TSG Hoffenheim	Chelsea	Undisclosed	
14 June 2025	(Japan) Saori Takarada	Leicester City	(Japan) Cerezo	Free	
16 June 2025	(Spain) Laia Aleixandri	Manchester City	(Spain) Barcelona	Free	
17 June 2025	Georgia Gibson	Newcastle United	Chester-le-Street Town	Free	
17 June 2025	(Sweden) Lina Hurtig	Arsenal	(Italy) Fiorentina	Free	
18 June 2025	(Canada) Jade Rose	(United States) Harvard Crimson	Manchester City	Undisclosed	
20 June 2025	(Netherlands) Daniëlle van de Donk	(France) Lyon	London City Lionesses	Free	
21 June 2025	(Japan) Moeka Minami	(Italy) Roma	Brighton & Hove Albion	Undisclosed	
22 June 2025	(Switzerland) Iman Beney	(Switzerland) Young Boys	Manchester City	Undisclosed	
23 June 2025	(Denmark) Karoline Olesen	Everton	(Sweden) Malmö	Free	
24 June 2025	(New Zealand) Jacqui Hand	Sheffield United	(Norway) Kolbotn	Free	
24 June 2025	Hannah Haughton	Portsmouth	Moneyfields	Free	
25 June 2025	(Denmark) Sara Holmgaard	Everton	(Spain) Real Madrid	Free	
25 June 2025	Abbi Jenner	Birmingham City	Wolverhampton Wanderers	Free	
25 June 2025	(Portugal) Inês Pereira	Everton	(Spain) Deportivo de La Coruña	Loan	
27 June 2025	(Sweden) Zećira Mušović	Chelsea	(Sweden) Malmö	Free	
27 June 2025	(Nigeria) Chiamaka Nnadozie	(France) Paris FC	Brighton & Hove Albion	Free	
27 June 2025	Amy Sims	Nottingham Forest	Wolverhampton Wanderers	Free	
30 June 2025	(Netherlands) Rosa van Gool	(Netherlands) Ajax	Everton	Free	
1 July 2025	Nicole Barrett	Portsmouth	Oxford United	Free	
1 July 2025	Charlotte Clarke	Birmingham City	West Bromwich Albion	Free	
1 July 2025	Hermione Cull	London City Lionesses	Plymouth Argyle	Free	
1 July 2025	Rebecca Ferguson	Newcastle United	Middlesbrough	Free	
1 July 2025	Amy Goddard	Sunderland	Southampton	Free	
1 July 2025	Jade Pennock	Birmingham City	(United States) Sporting Club Jacksonville	Free	
1 July 2025	Holly Turner	Nottingham Forest	Oxford United	Free	
1 July 2025	(South Korea) Choe Yu-ri	Birmingham City	(South Korea) Incheon Red Angels	Free	
2 July 2025	Naomi Bedeau	Nottingham Forest	Oxford United	Free	
2 July 2025	Reanna Blades	Burnley	Sunderland	Free	
2 July 2025	(Australia) Ellie Carpenter	(France) Lyon	Chelsea	Undisclosed	
2 July 2025	Bethan Davies	Sheffield United	Huddersfield Town	Free	
2 July 2025	Emma Harries	West Ham United	Southampton	Free	
2 July 2025	Chloe Kelly	Manchester City	Arsenal	Free	
2 July 2025	(Japan) Tōko Koga	(Netherlands) Feyenoord	Tottenham Hotspur	Undisclosed	
2 July 2025	(Canada) Ashley Lawrence	Chelsea	(France) Lyon	Free	
2 July 2025	Daisy McLachlan	Portsmouth	AFC Wimbledon	Free	
2 July 2025	(Wales) Rhiannon Roberts	(Spain) Real Betis	Sunderland	Free	
2 July 2025	Amy Rodgers	Bristol City	Nottingham Forest	Free	
2 July 2025	Ruby Tucker	Aston Villa	Southampton	Free	
2 July 2025	Olivia Watt	Newcastle United	Middlesbrough	Free	
3 July 2025	(Colombia) Manuela Vanegas	(Spain) Real Sociedad	Brighton & Hove Albion	Free	
4 July 2025	Mary Bashford	Charlton Athletic	Southampton	Free	
4 July 2025	Ellie Brazil	Charlton Athletic	Southampton	Free	
4 July 2025	(Scotland) Chelsea Cornet	(Scotland) Rangers	Birmingham City	Free	
4 July 2025	Grace Ede	Sunderland	Durham	Free	
4 July 2025	(Finland) Sanni Franssi	(Spain) Real Sociedad	London City Lionesses	Free	
4 July 2025	Holly Manders	Nottingham Forest	Oxford United	Free	
4 July 2025	Emma Thompson	Southampton	Oxford United	Free	
4 July 2025	(Spain) Ornella Vignola	(Spain) Granada	Everton	Undisclosed	
5 July 2025	Amy Andrews	Newcastle United	Sheffield United	Free	
5 July 2025	Jasmine Bull	Bristol City	Portsmouth	Free	
5 July 2025	Shannon Cooke	West Ham United	Birmingham City	Free	
5 July 2025	(Netherlands) Isa Kardinaal	(Netherlands) Ajax	London City Lionesses	Undisclosed	
5 July 2025	(Netherlands) Aniek Nouwen	Chelsea	(Netherlands) PSV	Free	
6 July 2025	Jessica Gray	Charlton Athletic	Portsmouth	Free	
6 July 2025	Amber Stobbs	Newcastle United	Durham	Free	
7 July 2025	Angela Addison	Ipswich Town	Durham	Free	
7 July 2025	Teyah Goldie	Arsenal	London City Lionesses	Free	
7 July 2025	(Jamaica) Taylor Hinds	Liverpool	Arsenal	Free	
7 July 2025	(Japan) Rion Ishikawa	(Japan) Urawa Red Diamonds	Everton	Undisclosed	
7 July 2025	(Jamaica) Becky Spencer	Tottenham Hotspur	Chelsea	Undisclosed	
7 July 2025	(Netherlands) Lynn Wilms	(Germany) VfL Wolfsburg	Aston Villa	Free	
8 July 2025	Megan Borthwick	Durham	Middlesbrough	Free	
8 July 2025	Lily Crosthwaite	Durham	Birmingham City	Free	
8 July 2025	(Brazil) Ivana Fuso	Birmingham City	(Brazil) Corinthians	Free	
8 July 2025	Lucy Johnson	Blackburn Rovers	Portsmouth	Free	
8 July 2025	Poppy Pattinson	Brighton & Hove Albion	London City Lionesses	Free	
8 July 2025	Ellie Roebuck	(Spain) Barcelona	Aston Villa	Free	
9 July 2025	(Canada) Rylee Foster	Durham	(United States) Dallas Trinity	Free	
9 July 2025	Carly Johns	Durham	(Scotland) Hearts	Free	
9 July 2025	(Japan) Hikaru Kitagawa	(Sweden) BK Häcken	Everton	Undisclosed	
9 July 2025	(Germany) Sydney Lohmann	(Germany) Bayern Munich	Manchester City	Undisclosed	
9 July 2025	Jemma Purfield	Southampton	Newcastle United	Free	
9 July 2025	(United States) Cat Sheppard	(Portugal) Sporting CP	Durham	Free	
10 July 2025	Charlie Devlin	Birmingham City	Sheffield United	Free	
10 July 2025	(United States) Mia Fishel	Chelsea	(United States) Seattle Reign	Undisclosed	
10 July 2025	(Spain) Elene Lete	(Spain) Real Sociedad	London City Lionesses	Free	
10 July 2025	(Republic of Ireland) Chloe Mustaki	Bristol City	Nottingham Forest	Free	
10 July 2025	Annie Rolf	Portsmouth	Lewes	Free	
11 July 2025	(Republic of Ireland) Grace Moloney	London City Lionesses	Sunderland	Free	
11 July 2025	(Japan) Yūka Momiki	Leicester City	Everton	Free	
11 July 2025	Tammi George	Wolverhampton Wanderers	Sheffield United	Free	
11 July 2025	Molly Pike	Southampton	Newcastle United	Free	
12 July 2025	Riva Casley	Portsmouth	Oxford United	Undisclosed	
12 July 2025	Holly Mears	Nottingham Forest	Norwich City	Free	
13 July 2025	Emma Taylor	Blackburn Rovers	Sheffield United	Free	
14 July 2025	Sarah Brasero-Carreira	(Portugal) Estoril	West Ham United	Undisclosed	
14 July 2025	(Scotland) Fallon Connolly-Jackson	Sheffield United	(Scotland) Rangers	Undisclosed	
14 July 2025	(Serbia) Miljana Ivanović	London City Lionesses	(Sweden) Malmö	Undisclosed	
14 July 2025	(Scotland) Kirsty Maclean	(Scotland) Rangers	Liverpool	Undisclosed	
14 July 2025	Paige Peake	Southampton	Ipswich Town	Free	
14 July 2025	(Scotland) Kirsty Smith	West Ham United	Nottingham Forest	Free	
14 July 2025	Connie Scofield	London City Lionesses	Sheffield United	Free	
15 July 2025	(Germany) Anneke Borbe	(Germany) VfL Wolfsburg	Arsenal	Free	
15 July 2025	Daisy Burt	Newcastle United	(United States) St. John’s Women’s Soccer	Free	
15 July 2025	Jordan Nobbs	Aston Villa	Newcastle United	Free	
15 July 2025	(Republic of Ireland) Tyler Toland	Blackburn Rovers	Durham	Free	
16 July 2025	(Netherlands) Jill Baijings	(Germany) Bayern Munich	Aston Villa	Undisclosed	
16 July 2025	Maria Edwards	Blackburn Rovers	Southampton	Free	
16 July 2025	Sophie Quirk	Portsmouth	AFC Bournemouth	Free	
16 July 2025	Katie Robinson	Aston Villa	Everton	Loan	
16 July 2025	Jess Simpson	Manchester United	Southampton	Loan	
16 July 2025	(Greece) Veatriki Sarri	Everton	Birmingham City	Undisclosed	
17 July 2025	(Republic of Ireland) Erin McLaughlin	Portsmouth	(Scotland) Glasgow City	Free	
17 July 2025	Angelina Nixon	Rugby Borough	Portsmouth	Free	
17 July 2025	Jessica Reavill	Stoke City	Sheffield United	Free	
17 July 2025	(Canada) Olivia Smith	Liverpool	Arsenal	£1,000,000	
18 July 2025	(Germany) Rafaela Borggräfe	(Germany) SC Freiburg	Liverpool	Free	
18 July 2025	(Nigeria) Comfort Erhabor	Brighton & Hove Albion	Portsmouth	Free	
18 July 2025	(Spain) Martina Fernández	(Spain) Barcelona	Everton	Undisclosed	
18 July 2025	Hannah Greenwood	Newcastle United	Sunderland	Free	
18 July 2025	(Republic of Ireland) Lucia Lobato	(France) Marseille	Charlton Athletic	Free	
18 July 2025	(Republic of Ireland) Aoife Mannion	Manchester United	Newcastle United	Free	
18 July 2025	(Australia) Teagan Micah	Liverpool	(France) Lyon	Free	
18 July 2025	Tia Primmer	Blackburn Rovers	Portsmouth	Free	
18 July 2025	(Scotland) Sam Kerr	(Germany) Bayern Munich	Liverpool	Free	
19 July 2025	Sophia Poor	Aston Villa	London City Lionesses	Undisclosed	
19 July 2025	Lauren Thomas	Everton	Sheffield United	Free	
21 July 2025	Gemma Lawley	Birmingham City	Bristol City	Free	
21 July 2025	(Scotland) Emily Mutch	(Scotland) Motherwell	Bristol City	Free	
22 July 2025	Alyssa Aherne	Manchester United	Sheffield United	Free	
22 July 2025	(Sweden) Marika Bergman-Lundin	West Ham United	(Norway) Vålerenga	Free	
22 July 2025	(Malta) Maria Farrugia	Sheffield United	Bristol City	Free	
22 July 2025	(Denmark) Mille Gejl	Crystal Palace	(Denmark) HB Køge	Free	
22 July 2025	(Canada) Clarissa Larisey	Crystal Palace	(United States) Houston Dash	Undisclosed	
22 July 2025	(Denmark) Rikke Madsen	Everton	(Denmark) HB Køge	Free	
22 July 2025	(Scotland) Jamie-Lee Napier	Bristol City	Crystal Palace	Free	
22 July 2025	(Philippines) Maz Pacheco	Aston Villa	Everton	Free	
23 July 2025	Georgia Brougham	London City Lionesses	Nottingham Forest	Free	
23 July 2025	Rianna Dean	Southampton	Ipswich Town	Free	
23 July 2025	Freya Godfrey	Arsenal	London City Lionesses	Undisclosed	
23 July 2025	(Republic of Ireland) Jessica Hennessy	Nottingham Forest	AFC Bournemouth	Free	
23 July 2025	Lucia Kendall	Southampton	Aston Villa	Free	
23 July 2025	(United States) Gillian Kenney	(United States) South Shore Select	Charlton Athletic	Free	
23 July 2025	(Republic of Ireland) Eleanor Ryan-Doyle	Durham	(Republic of Ireland) Peamount United	Free	
24 July 2025	Jemima Dahou	Blackburn Rovers	Portsmouth	Free	
24 July 2025	(Scotland) Abbie Ferguson	(Scotland) Hibernian	Southampton	Free	
24 July 2025	(Republic of Ireland) Jamie Finn	Birmingham City	Sunderland	Free	
24 July 2025	Ellie Hack	Blackburn Rovers	Southampton	Free	
24 July 2025	Melissa Lawley	Everton	Burnley	Loan	
24 July 2025	(Northern Ireland) Ellie Mason	Birmingham City	Charlton Athletic	Free	
24 July 2025	(Wales) Mary McAteer	Sunderland	Charlton Athletic	Free	
24 July 2025	Sophie O'Rourke	Charlton Athletic	Sheffield United	Free	
24 July 2025	(Republic of Ireland) Kiera Sena	(Republic of Ireland) Cork City	Southampton	Free	
25 July 2025	(France) Océane Deslandes	(France) Montpellier	Aston Villa	Free	
25 July 2025	(Republic of Ireland) Mel Filis	Charlton Athletic	(Italy) Sassuolo	Free	
25 July 2025	Lyndsey Harkin	Nottingham Forest	Wolverhampton Wanderers	Free	
25 July 2025	Anna Pederson	Rugby Borough	Charlton Athletic	Free	
25 July 2025	(South Korea) Cho So-hyun	Birmingham City	(South Korea) Suwon	Free	
26 July 2025	Lucy Fitzgerald	London City Lionesses	Charlton Athletic	Free	
26 July 2025	(Scotland) Sophie Howard	Leicester City	(Italy) Como	Free	
26 July 2025	Nikita Parris	Brighton & Hove Albion	London City Lionesses	Free	
26 July 2025	Louanne Worsey	Birmingham City	Wolverhampton Wanderers	Free	
27 July 2025	(Wales) Alice Griffiths	Southampton	(Scotland) Rangers	Free	
28 July 2025	(Northern Ireland) Megan Bell	Nottingham Forest	(Northern Ireland) Linfield	Free	
28 July 2025	Millie Chandarana	Nottingham Forest	Burnley	Free	
28 July 2025	(Republic of Ireland) Jessie Stapleton	West Ham United	Nottingham Forest	Loan	
28 July 2025	(Denmark) Katrine Veje	Crystal Palace	(Italy) Roma	Free	
28 July 2025	(Wales) Lily Woodham	(United States) Seattle Reign	Liverpool	Free	
30 July 2025	Ruby Doe	West Ham United	Ipswich Town	Free	
30 July 2025	(Wales) Ffion Morgan	Bristol City	West Ham United	Free	
30 July 2025	(Poland) Małgorzata Grec	(France) Dijon	Newcastle United	Free	
31 July 2025	(Republic of Ireland) Izzy Atkinson	Crystal Palace	Sunderland	Free	
31 July 2025	Zoe Barratt	Oxford United	Charlton Athletic	Free	
31 July 2025	Jenna Dear	Sunderland	Ipswich Town	Free	
31 July 2025	Rio Hardy	(Scotland) Rangers	Bristol City	Undisclosed	
31 July 2025	(New Zealand) Grace Neville	London City Lionesses	Ipswich Town	Free	
31 July 2025	(Australia) Courtney Nevin	Leicester City	(Sweden) Malmö	Free	
31 July 2025	Bethan Roe	Charlton Athletic	Ipswich Town	Free	
31 July 2025	(United States) Katie Stengel	Crystal Palace	(United States) Gotham FC	Undisclosed	
31 July 2025	(Sweden) Julia Zigiotti Olme	(Germany) Bayern Munich	Manchester United	Undisclosed	
1 August 2025	(New Zealand) CJ Bott	Leicester City	(New Zealand) Wellington Phoenix	Free	
1 August 2025	Aimee Claypole	Chelsea	Nottingham Forest	Free	
1 August 2025	(Japan) Yu Endo	(Japan) Urawa Red Diamonds	West Ham United	Free	
1 August 2025	Sophie Haywood	Newcastle United	Hull City	Free	
1 August 2025	(Sweden) Amanda Ilestedt	Arsenal	(Germany) Eintracht Frankfurt	Free	
1 August 2025	Abbey Jones	(United States) University of Connecticut	Durham	Free	
1 August 2025	(Germany) Melina Loeck	Brighton & Hove Albion	(Sweden) Hammarby	Loan	
1 August 2025	(Italy) Elena Linari	(Italy) AS Roma	London City Lionesses	Free	
2 August 2025	(Spain) Paula Partido	(Spain) Real Madrid	London City Lionesses	Free	
3 August 2025	Sophie Baigent	Hashtag United	Ipswich Town	Free	
4 August 2025	(United States) Deirdre Bradley	Durham	Burnley	Free	
4 August 2025	(Spain) Carla Camacho	(Spain) Real Madrid	Brighton & Hove Albion	Free	
4 August 2025	Olivia Edwards	Sheffield United	Derby County	Free	
4 August 2025	(Republic of Ireland) Katie Keane	(Republic of Ireland) Shamrock Rovers	Leicester City	Undisclosed	
5 August 2025	(United States) Celeste Boureille	(France) Montpellier	Leicester City	Free	
5 August 2025	Vera Jones	Chelsea	Bristol City	Loan	
5 August 2025	(Republic of Ireland) Joy Ralph	(Republic of Ireland) Shamrock Rovers	Sheffield United	Undisclosed	
5 August 2025	(Finland) Ria Öling	Crystal Palace	(Portugal) Braga	Free	
5 August 2025	(Japan) Aemu Oyama	Manchester City	(Sweden) Rosengård	Loan	
6 August 2025	(Belgium) Yana Daniëls	Liverpool	Burnley	Free	
6 August 2025	Bridget Galloway	Nottingham Forest	(Scotland) Aberdeen	Free	
6 August 2025	Jasmine Matthews	Liverpool	Burnley	Free	
6 August 2025	(Scotland) Emma Mukandi	London City Lionesses	Retired		
7 August 2025	Lola Brown	Chelsea	Crystal Palace	Loan	
7 August 2025	Annie Wilding	Sheffield United	Portsmouth	Free	
8 August 2025	Katie Cox	Chelsea	(Scotland) Aberdeen	Loan	
8 August 2025	(Scotland) Eartha Cumings	(Sweden) Rosengård	Manchester City	Undisclosed	
8 August 2025	Katie Dungate	Birmingham City	Fulham	Free	
8 August 2025	(Wales) Sophie Ingle	Chelsea	Bristol City	Free	
8 August 2025	(Spain) Paula Partido	London City Lionesses	(Spain) Dux Logroño	Loan	
8 August 2025	Sophia Poor	London City Lionesses	Nottingham Forest	Loan	
9 August 2025	Isabel Milne	Birmingham City	Fulham	Free	
11 August 2025	(Sweden) Rosa Kafaji	Arsenal	Brighton & Hove Albion	Loan	
11 August 2025	(France) Maelys Mpomé	Chelsea	Brighton & Hove Albion	Undisclosed	
12 August 2025	(Wales) Kayleigh Barton	Charlton Athletic	Retired		
12 August 2025	(Ghana) Chantelle Boye-Hlorkah	London City Lionesses	Nottingham Forest	Free	
12 August 2025	(China) Shen Mengyu	London City Lionesses	(China) Shanghai Shengli	Free	
12 August 2025	(Norway) Maren Mjelde	Everton	(Norway) Arna-Bjørnar	Free	
13 August 2025	Ella Rutherford	Ipswich Town	Portsmouth	Free	
13 August 2025	(Venezuela) Mariana Speckmaier	(Australia) Melbourne City	Durham	Undisclosed	
13 August 2025	(Belgium) Justine Vanhaevermaet	Everton	Crystal Palace	Free	
14 August 2025	Danielle Turner	Aston Villa	(Australia) Melbourne City	Free	
14 August 2025	(Spain) Vicky Losada	Brighton & Hove Albion	Bristol City	Free	
15 August 2025	(Spain) Jana Fernández	(Spain) Barcelona	London City Lionesses	Undisclosed	
15 August 2025	(Wales) Esther Morgan	Sheffield United	Bristol City	Free	
15 August 2025	(Republic of Ireland) Heather Payne	Everton	Leicester City	Free	
15 August 2025	(Sweden) Fridolina Rolfö	(Spain) Barcelona	Manchester United	Free	
15 August 2025	(Serbia) Dejana Stefanović	Brighton & Hove Albion	(Serbia) Red Star Belgrade	Free	
15 August 2025	(Austria) Laura Wienroither	Arsenal	Manchester City	Undisclosed	
16 August 2025	(Wales) Scarlett Williams	Portsmouth	Real Bedford	Free	
17 August 2025	(Norway) Benedicte Håland	Southampton	(Wales) Gwalia United	Free	
18 August 2025	(Norway) Maria Thorisdottir	Brighton & Hove Albion	(France) Olympique de Marseille	Free	
18 August 2025	Soraya Walsh	West Ham United	Watford	Loan	
19 August 2025	Michelle Agyemang	Arsenal	Brighton & Hove Albion	Loan	
19 August 2025	(Canada) Deanne Rose	Leicester City	Nottingham Forest	Free	
19 August 2025	(Wales) Rachel Rowe	Southampton	Nottingham Forest	Undisclosed	
20 August 2025	Monique Robinson	Sheffield United	West Bromwich Albion	Free	
21 August 2025	Lucy Newell	Manchester United	Birmingham City	Loan	
22 August 2025	Ashanti Akpan	Chelsea	Southampton	Loan	
22 August 2025	(Japan) Maya Hijikata	(Japan) Tokyo Verdy Beleza	Aston Villa	Undisclosed	
22 August 2025	(Scotland) Emma Watson	Manchester United	Crystal Palace	Loan	
23 August 2025	(Switzerland) Leila Wandeler	(France) Lyon	West Ham United	Undisclosed	
24 August 2025	(Scotland) Michaela McAlonie	(Scotland) Hibernian	Southampton	Undisclosed	
25 August 2025	(United States) Morgan Gautrat	(United States) Orlando Pride	Newcastle United	Loan	
25 August 2025	Laila Harbert	Arsenal	(United States) Portland Thorns	Loan	
26 August 2025	(Spain) Júlia Bartel	Chelsea	(Spain) Atlético Madrid	Loan	
26 August 2025	(Haiti) Batcheba Louis	(France) Fleury 91	Birmingham City	Undisclosed	
27 August 2025	Greta Humphries	Chelsea	Portsmouth	Free	
27 August 2025	(Australia) Alanna Kennedy	(United States) Angel City	London City Lionesses	Undisclosed	
27 August 2025	Katie Zelem	(United States) Angel City	London City Lionesses	Undisclosed	
28 August 2025	Katie Barker	Newcastle United	(Wales) Wrexham	Free	
28 August 2025	Jodie Bartle	Newcastle United	(Wales) Wrexham	Free	
28 August 2025	(Chile) Camila Sáez	West Ham United	Bristol City	Loan	
29 August 2025	(France) Océane Hurtré	(France) Paris Saint-Germain	Birmingham City	Undisclosed	
29 August 2025	(Australia) Hayley Raso	Tottenham Hotspur	(Germany) Eintracht Frankfurt	Undisclosed	
29 August 2025	(France) Wassa Sangaré	(France) Lyon	London City Lionesses	Loan	
29 August 2025	(Finland) Oona Sevenius	(Sweden) Rosengård	Newcastle United	Undisclosed	
29 August 2025	(Denmark) Amalie Thestrup	Bristol City	Charlton Athletic	Free	
29 August 2025	(Republic of Ireland) Jessica Ziu	West Ham United	Bristol City	Loan	
31 August 2025	Amelia Ajao	London City Lionesses	AFC Wimbledon	Free	
31 August 2025	Ella Humphrey	Portsmouth	Moneyfields	Free	
1 September 2025	Princess Ademiluyi	West Ham United	(United States) Gotham FC	Undisclosed	
1 September 2025	Olivia Johnson	Brighton & Hove Albion	Bristol City	Loan	
2 September 2025	(France) Louna Ribadeira	Chelsea F.C.	(France) Fleury	Loan	
2 September 2025	Naomi Williams	Arsenal	Bristol City	Loan	
3 September 2025	Keira Barry	Manchester United	Sunderland	Loan	
3 September 2025	Jessie Gale	Arsenal	Portsmouth	Loan	
3 September 2025	Vivienne Lia	Arsenal	Nottingham Forest	Loan	
3 September 2025	Ruby Mace	Leicester City	Everton	Undisclosed	
3 September 2025	(Cameroon) Charlène Meyong	London City Lionesses	(Saudi Arabia) Al-Ahli Saudi	Free	
3 September 2025	(Scotland) Charlotte Parker-Smith	(Scotland) Hearts	Sheffield United	Free	
4 September 2025	(Sweden) Tove Almqvist	(Sweden) Djurgårdens	Nottingham Forest	Free	
4 September 2025	Eve Annets	Manchester City	Crystal Palace	Loan	
4 September 2025	(Morocco) Rosella Ayane	Tottenham Hotspur	Leicester City	Free	
4 September 2025	Libby Bance	Brighton & Hove Albion	Birmingham City	Loan	
4 September 2025	(Spain) Alejandra Bernabé	Chelsea	Liverpool	Undisclosed	
4 September 2025	Grace Clinton	Manchester United	Manchester City	Undisclosed	
4 September 2025	(Spain) Lucía Corrales	(Spain) Barcelona	London City Lionesses	£450,000	
4 September 2025	(Hungary) Anna Csiki	Tottenham Hotspur	West Ham United	Loan	
4 September 2025	Marine Dafeur	(France) Fleury 91	Bristol City	Free	
4 September 2025	Maddy Earl	Arsenal	Ipswich Town	Loan	
4 September 2025	Keira Flannery	West Ham United	Charlton Athletic	Loan	
4 September 2025	Jorja Fox	Chelsea F.C.	Newcastle United	Loan	
4 September 2025	(Spain) Nahikari García	(United States) Denver Summit	Nottingham Forest	Loan	
4 September 2025	(Sweden) Ebba Hed	(Sweden) Djurgårdens	Nottingham Forest	Free	
4 September 2025	Issy Hobson	Everton	Nottingham Forest	Loan	
4 September 2025	(Scotland) Kirsty Howat	(Scotland) Rangers	Crystal Palace	Free	
4 September 2025	Poppy Irvine	Birmingham City	Sporting Khalsa	Loan	
4 September 2025	(Netherlands) Femke Liefting	Chelsea F.C.	Newcastle United	Loan	
4 September 2025	Olivia McLoughlin	(Scotland) Rangers	Leicester City	Undisclosed	
4 September 2025	(Canada) Kaila Novak	Durham	(Canada) AFC Toronto	Free	
4 September 2025	(Republic of Ireland) Tara O'Hanlon	Manchester City	Sunderland	Loan	
4 September 2025	(Sweden) Beata Olsson	(Sweden) Kristianstads	Liverpool	Undisclosed	
4 September 2025	Jess Park	Manchester City	Manchester United	Undisclosed	
4 September 2025	Poppy Pritchard	Manchester City	Durham	Loan	
4 September 2025	Evie Rabjohn	Manchester United	Sunderland	Loan	
4 September 2025	(Japan) Risa Shimizu	Manchester City	Liverpool	Loan	
4 September 2025	(Poland) Emilia Szymczak	(Spain) Barcelona	Liverpool	Loan	
4 September 2025	(Norway) Cathinka Tandberg	(Sweden) Hammarby	Tottenham Hotspur	Undisclosed	
4 September 2025	(Japan) Fuka Tsunoda	(Japan) Urawa Red Diamonds	Brighton & Hove Albion	Undisclosed	
4 September 2025	(Australia) Emily van Egmond	Birmingham City	Leicester City	Undisclosed	
4 September 2025	(Switzerland) Lia Wälti	Arsenal	(Italy) Juventus	Undisclosed	
4 September 2025	Cecily Wellesley-Smith	Arsenal	Leicester City	Loan	
5 September 2025	(France) Grace Geyoro	(France) Paris Saint-Germain	London City Lionesses	Undisclosed	
5 September 2025	Jessica Pegram	Brighton & Hove Albion	(Scotland) Rangers	Loan	
5 September 2025	Mollie Rouse	(United States) Spokane Zephyr	Sheffield United	Free	
5 September 2025	(South Korea) Ji So-yun	(United States) Seattle Reign	Birmingham City	Loan	
5 September 2025	(Finland) Anna Tamminen	(Sweden) Hammarby	Newcastle United	Free	
5 September 2025	Tianna Teisar	Bristol City	Plymouth Argyle	Loan	
5 September 2025	(United States) Alyssa Thompson	(United States) Angel City	Chelsea	Undisclosed	
6 September 2025	(Philippines) Nina Meollo	Ipswich Town	Real Bedford	Loan	
7 September 2025	(Northern Ireland) Leyla McFarland	(Hungary) Ferencvárosi	Durham	Free	
9 September 2025	(France) Shana Chossenotte	Leicester City	(France) Fleury 91	Undisclosed	
9 September 2025	Libby Smith	Birmingham City	(United States) Sporting Club Jacksonville	Free	
