= 2024–25 Middlesbrough F.C. Women season =

Middlesbrough
2024–25 season
- Chairman: Steve Gibson
- Manager: Michael Mulhern
- Stadium: Bishopton Road West; Riverside Stadium
- Division One North: 1st (promoted)
- FA Cup: Third round
- WNL Cup: Quarter-finals
- Top goalscorer: League: Jessica Mett (9); All: Lauren Robson (13)
- Highest home attendance: 4,083 (vs. Doncaster Rovers, Division One North, 13 April 2025)
- Lowest home attendance: 236 (vs. AFC Fylde, Division One North, 1 September 2024)
- Average home league attendance: 702
- Biggest win: 7–0 (vs. Doncaster Rovers (H), Division One North, 13 April 2025)
- Biggest defeat: 3–0 (vs. Doncaster Rovers (A), Division One North, 10 November 2024)
Home colours	Away colours

The 2024–25 season was the 49th season of competitive football in the history of Middlesbrough Football Club Women, and their third consecutive season in the FA National League Division One North, the fourth level of English women's football. The club also participated in the FA Cup, and the WNL Cup.

Middlesbrough secured promotion and the league title on the final day of the season, following a 3–0 win against Barnsley.

== Squad ==
As of 8 January 2025.

Note: Flags indicate national team as defined under FIFA eligibility rules; some limited exceptions apply. Players may hold more than one non-FIFA nationality.

No.	Pos.	Nation	Player
1	GK	ENG	Laura Wareham
2	DF	ENG	Jane Harland
3	DF	ENG	Keira Skelton
4	MF	ENG	Bethany Guy
5	DF	ENG	Ellen Packham
6	DF	ENG	Abby Towers
7	FW	ENG	Ellen Turnbull
8	FW	ENG	Jessica Mett
9	FW	ENG	Armani Maxwell
10	MF	ENG	Lauren Robson
11	MF	ENG	Leanna Giles
13	GK	ENG	Ruby Cook
14	DF	ENG	Emma Foster

No.	Pos.	Nation	Player
15	MF	ENG	Sharna Wilkinson
16	MF	ENG	Francesca Ward
17	DF	ENG	Millie Bell
18	MF	ENG	Sarah Burn (captain)
19	FW	ENG	Becky Ferguson (on loan from Newcastle United)
21	FW	ENG	Faye Dale
22	DF	ENG	Grace Boyes (vice-captain)
23	MF	ENG	Chelsea Callander (dual registration with Manchester City)
24	MF	ENG	Kacie Elson
25	FW	ENG	Maddie Myers
26	DF	ENG	Darcie Sugden-Brook
27	FW	ENG	Georgia Gibson (on loan from Newcastle United)

== Transfers ==
=== In ===
Date	Position	Nationality	Name	From	Ref.
2 July 2024	MF	(England)	Leanna Giles	(England) Durham Cestria	
2 July 2024	DF	(England)	Keira Skelton	(England) Newcastle United	
9 July 2024	DF	(England)	Grace Boyes	(England) Newcastle United	
11 July 2024	FW	(England)	Maddie Myers	(England) Norton & Stockton Ancients	
12 July 2024	DF	(England)	Ruby Forster	(England) Durham Cestria	
7 August 2024	MF	(England)	Sharna Wilkinson	(England) Newcastle United	
28 November 2024	DF	(England)	Darcie Sugden-Brook	(England) Blackburn Rovers	
8 January 2025	MF	(England)	Kacie Elson	(England) Newcastle United	

=== Loans in ===
Date	Position	Nationality	Name	From	Until	Ref.
1 November 2024	FW	(England)	Becky Ferguson	(England) Newcastle United	End of season	
14 December 2024	MF	(England)	Chelsea Callander	(England) Manchester City	End of season	
8 January 2025	FW	(England)	Georgia Gibson	(England) Newcastle United	End of season	

== Competitions ==
=== Division One North ===
==== League table ====
Pos	Team	Pld	W	D	L	GF	GA	GD	Pts	Qualification
1	Middlesbrough (C, P)	22	15	6	1	45	13	+32	51	Promotion to FA WNL Premier Division
2	Cheadle Town Stingers	22	16	3	3	38	11	+27	51	
3	Chorley	22	13	4	5	47	30	+17	43	
4	Leeds United	22	13	2	7	53	32	+21	41	
5	Huddersfield Town	22	10	6	6	31	24	+7	36	

Source: The Football Association
Rules for classification: 1) Points; 2) Goal difference; 3) Number of goals scored
(C) Champions; (P) Promoted

==== Results summary ====
Overall								Home						Away					
Pld	W	D	L	GF	GA	GD	Pts	W	D	L	GF	GA	GD	W	D	L	GF	GA	GD
22	15	6	1	45	13	+32	51	10	1	0	32	4	+28	5	5	1	13	9	+4

Last updated: 27 April 2025.
Source: FA WNL Division 1 North

==== Results by round ====
Round	1	2	3	4	6	8	7^{1}	9	10	11	15	12^{2}	16	5^{3}	17	14^{4}	18	19	13^{5}	20	21	22
Ground	H	A	H	A	H	A	H	H	A	H	H	A	H	A	A	A	A	H	H	A	H	A
Result	W	D	W	W	W	D	W	W	L	D	W	D	W	W	D	D	W	W	W	W	W	W
Position	5	4	3	1	1	1	1	1	1	3	4	4	2	2	2	2	2	2	2	2	1	1
Points	3	4	7	10	13	14	17	20	20	21	24	25	28	31	32	33	36	39	42	45	48	51

Source: FA WNL Division 1 North
A = Away; H = Home; W = Win; D = Draw; L = Loss
Notes:
- ^{1} Matchday 7 (vs York City) was rescheduled and replayed in full, after a York City player sustained an injury during the original match.
- ^{2} Matchday 12 (vs Cheadle Town) was originally scheduled for 8 December 2024, but was postponed due to Middlesbrough's involvement in the FA Cup.
- ^{3} Matchday 5 (vs Stockport County) was originally scheduled for 15 September 2024, but was postponed due to Middlesbrough's involvement in the WNL Cup.
- ^{4} Matchday 14 (vs AFC Fylde) was originally scheduled for 5 January 2025, but was postponed due to poor weather conditions.
- ^{5} Matchday 13 (vs Norton & Stockton Ancients) was originally scheduled for 15 December 2024, but was postponed due to Middlesbrough's involvement in the WNL Cup.

==== Matches ====
The FA Women's National League fixtures were released on 15 July 2024.

18 August 2024 1	Middlesbrough	1–0	Cheadle Town	Stockton
15:00 BST	Mett 17'	Report		Stadium: Bishopton Road West

25 August 2024 2	Norton & Stockton Ancients	1–1	Middlesbrough	Stockton
14:00 BST	Atkinson 8'	Report	Turnbull 50'	Stadium: Norton Sports Complex

1 September 2024 3	Middlesbrough	3–1	AFC Fylde	Stockton
14:00 BST	Robson 3'; Turnbull 10', 54'	Report	Binks 27'	Stadium: Bishopton Road West

8 September 2024 4	Leeds United	2–3	Middlesbrough	Garforth
14:00 BST	Woodruff 13', 45'	Report	Robson 4'; Giles 57'; Mett 88'	Stadium: Bannister Prentice Stadium

22 September 2024 6	Middlesbrough	2–0	Huddersfield Town	Stockton
14:00 BST	Giles 72'; Maxwell 75'	Report		Stadium: Bishopton Road West

6 October 2024 8	Chorley	0–0	Middlesbrough	Euxton
14:00 BST		Report		Stadium: Jim Fowler Memorial Ground

16 October 2024 7	Middlesbrough	3–0	York City	Redcar
19:45 BST	Bell 33'; Robson 56', 68'	Report		Stadium: Green Lane
Note: Match, originally scheduled for 25 September 2024, was abandoned and replayed on 16 October 2024, after a York City player sustained an injury during the original match.

27 October 2024 9	Middlesbrough	3–0	Durham Cestria	Stockton
14:00 GMT	Bell 30', 88'; Giles 89'	Report		Stadium: Bishopton Road West

10 November 2024 10	Doncaster Rovers	3–0	Middlesbrough	Doncaster
14:00 GMT	Saxton 60', 90'; Own Goal 79' (o.g.)	Report		Stadium: Denaby Main

17 November 2024 11	Middlesbrough	2–2	Barnsley	Stockton
14:00 GMT	Giles 17'; Own Goal 88' (o.g.)	Report	Own Goal 10' (o.g.); Millard 45'	Stadium: Bishopton Road West

12 January 2025 15	Middlesbrough	1–0	Leeds United	Stockton
14:00 GMT	Ferguson 27'	Report		Stadium: Bishopton Road West

26 January 2025 12	Cheadle Town	0–0	Middlesbrough	Cheadle
14:00 GMT		Report		Stadium: Park Road Stadium
Note: Fixture was originally scheduled for 8 December 2024, but was postponed due to Middlesbrough's involvement in the FA Cup.

2 February 2025 16	Middlesbrough	2–1	Chorley	Stockton
14:00 GMT	Turnbull 45+6'; Robson 60'	Report	Worthington 9'	Stadium: Bishopton Road West

9 February 2025 5	Stockport County	0–1	Middlesbrough	Stockport
14:00 GMT		Report	Mett 54'	Stadium: Stockport Sports Village
Note: Fixture was originally scheduled for 15 September 2024, but was postponed due to Middlesbrough's involvement in the WNL Cup.

12 February 2025 17	York City	1–1	Middlesbrough	York
19:45 GMT	Jones 72'	Report	Mett 18'	Stadium: York Community Stadium

16 February 2025 14	AFC Fylde	1–1	Middlesbrough	Warton
14:00 GMT	Devereaux 40'	Report	Mett 90+6'	Stadium: Kellamergh Park
Note: Match, originally scheduled for 5 January 2025, was postponed due to poor weather conditions.

23 February 2025 18	Huddersfield Town	0–1	Middlesbrough	Huddersfield
14:00 GMT		Report	Maxwell 75'	Stadium: Stafflex Arena

9 March 2025 19	Middlesbrough	4–0	Stockport County	Stockton
14:00 GMT	Bell 8'; Maxwell 29', 38'; Mett 43'	Report		Stadium: Bishopton Road West

16 March 2025 13	Middlesbrough	4–0	Norton & Stockton Ancients	Stockton
14:00 GMT	Bell 4'; Packham 56'; Giles 68'; Maxwell 74'	Report		Stadium: Bishopton Road West
Note: Match, originally scheduled for 15 December 2024, was postponed due to Middlesbrough's involvement in the WNL Cup.

23 March 2025 20	Durham Cestria	1–2	Middlesbrough	Durham
14:00 GMT	Collinson 78'	Report	Mett 53'; Robson 65'	Stadium: Maiden Castle

13 April 2025 21	Middlesbrough	7–0	Doncaster Rovers	Middlesbrough
14:00 BST	Robson 2', 70'; Maxwell 24'; Turnbull 33'; Mett 45'; Bell 51'; Elson 79'	Report		Stadium: Riverside Stadium; Attendance: 4,083

27 April 2025 22	Barnsley	0–3	Middlesbrough	Barnsley
14:00 BST		Report	Bell 45'; Mett 59'; Wilkinson 88'	Stadium: Oakwell

=== FA Cup ===
13 October 2024 Third qualifying round	Darwen	1–2	Middlesbrough	Darwen
14:00 BST	Johnson 78'	Report	Wilkinson 26'; Packham 44'	Stadium: Anchor Ground

3 November 2024 First round	Wythenshawe	0–3	Middlesbrough	Wythenshawe
13:00 GMT		Report	Robson 34'; Turnbull 60', 78'	Stadium: Hollyhedge Community Stadium

1 December 2024 Second round	Hull City	0–0 (4–5 p)	Middlesbrough	Barton
14:00 GMT		Report		Stadium: Easy Buy Stadium

8 December 2024 Third round	Newcastle United	2–0	Middlesbrough	Newcastle upon Tyne
13:00 GMT	Greenwood 42', 84'	Report		Stadium: Kingston Park

=== WNL Cup ===
28 August 2024 Determining round	Middlesbrough	4–1	Durham Cestria	Redcar
19:45 BST	Turnbull 12', 50'; Bell 16', 31'	Report	Brown 68'	Stadium: Green Lane

15 September 2024 Preliminary round	Stourbridge	1–4	Middlesbrough	Stourbridge
14:00 BST	Bennett-Steele 35'	Report	Mett 16'; Robson 40', 69'; Towers 52'	Stadium: War Memorial Athletic Ground

29 September 2024 First round	Middlesbrough	2–0	Leeds United	Stockton
14:00 BST	Bell 20'; Turnbull 85'	Report		Stadium: Bishopton Road West

20 October 2024 Second round	Middlesbrough	1–0	West Bromwich Albion	Stockton
14:00 BST	Robson 27'	Report		Stadium: Bishopton Road West

15 December 2024 Quarter-finals	Middlesbrough	1–2	Nottingham Forest	Stockton
14:00 GMT	Robson 68'	Report	Wellings 15'; Thomas 74'	Stadium: Bishopton Road West

== Statistics ==
=== Appearances and goals ===
As of 27 April 2025

Starting appearances are listed first, followed by substitute appearances after the + symbol where applicable.

No.	Pos	Nat	Player	Total		D1N		FA Cup		WNL Cup	
No.	Pos	Nat	Player	Apps	Goals	Apps	Goals	Apps	Goals	Apps	Goals
Goalkeepers
1	GK	(England) ENG	Laura Wareham	20	0	12	0	4	0	4	0
13	GK	(England) ENG	Ruby Cook	12	0	10	0	0+1	0	1	0
Defenders
2	DF	(England) ENG	Jane Harland	1	0	0	0	0	0	0+1	0
3	DF	(England) ENG	Keira Skelton	17	0	10+3	0	1	0	2+1	0
5	DF	(England) ENG	Ellen Packham	27	2	19	1	3	1	5	0
6	DF	(England) ENG	Abby Towers	27	1	18	0	4	0	5	1
14	DF	(England) ENG	Emma Foster	12	0	5+4	0	0+1	0	1+1	0
17	DF	(England) ENG	Millie Bell	31	10	22	7	4	0	5	3
22	DF	(England) ENG	Grace Boyes	27	0	19+1	0	3+1	0	2+1	0
24	DF	(England) ENG	Ruby Forster	1	0	0	0	0+1	0	0	0
26	DF	(England) ENG	Darcie Sugden-Brook	0	0	0	0	0	0	0	0
Midfielders
10	MF	(England) ENG	Lauren Robson	31	13	22	8	4	1	5	4
11	MF	(England) ENG	Leanna Giles	31	5	22	5	4	0	5	0
15	MF	(England) ENG	Sharna Wilkinson	26	2	11+6	1	4	1	4+1	0
16	MF	(England) ENG	Francesca Ward	3	0	0	0	0+1	0	0+2	0
18	MF	(England) ENG	Sarah Burn	10	0	4+2	0	1+1	0	1+1	0
23	MF	(England) ENG	Chelsea Callander	1	0	0	0	0	0	0+1	0
24	MF	(England) ENG	Kacie Elson	7	1	4+3	1	0	0	0	0
Forwards
7	FW	(England) ENG	Ellen Turnbull	30	10	21	5	4	2	5	3
8	FW	(England) ENG	Jessica Mett	27	10	18+2	9	2	0	4+1	1
9	FW	(England) ENG	Armani Maxwell	30	6	17+4	6	4	0	5	0
19	FW	(England) ENG	Becky Ferguson	12	1	4+5	1	1+1	0	1	0
27	FW	(England) ENG	Georgia Gibson	9	0	1+8	0	0	0	0	0
25	FW	(England) ENG	Maddie Myers	0	0	0	0	0	0	0	0
Players who appeared but left during the season
4	MF	(England) ENG	Bethany Guy	3	0	2	0	0	0	0+1	0
21	FW	(England) ENG	Faye Dale	11	0	1+4	0	1+1	0	0+4	0

=== Goalscorers ===
Rank	No.	Nat.	Po.	Name	D1N	FA Cup	WNL Cup	Total
1	10	(England)	MF	Lauren Robson	8	1	4	13
2	7	(England)	FW	Ellen Turnbull	5	2	3	10
2	8	(England)	FW	Jessica Mett	9	0	1	10
2	17	(England)	MF	Millie Bell	7	0	3	10
3	9	(England)	FW	Armani Maxwell	6	0	0	6
4	11	(England)	MF	Leanna Giles	5	0	0	5
5	5	(England)	DF	Ellen Packham	1	1	0	2
5	18	(England)	MF	Sharna Wilkinson	1	1	0	2
6	6	(England)	DF	Abby Towers	0	0	1	1
6	19	(England)	FW	Becky Ferguson	1	0	0	1
6	24	(England)	MF	Kacie Elson	1	0	0	1
Own goals					1	0	0	1
Total					45	5	11	61
