= 2024–25 FA Women's National League Cup =

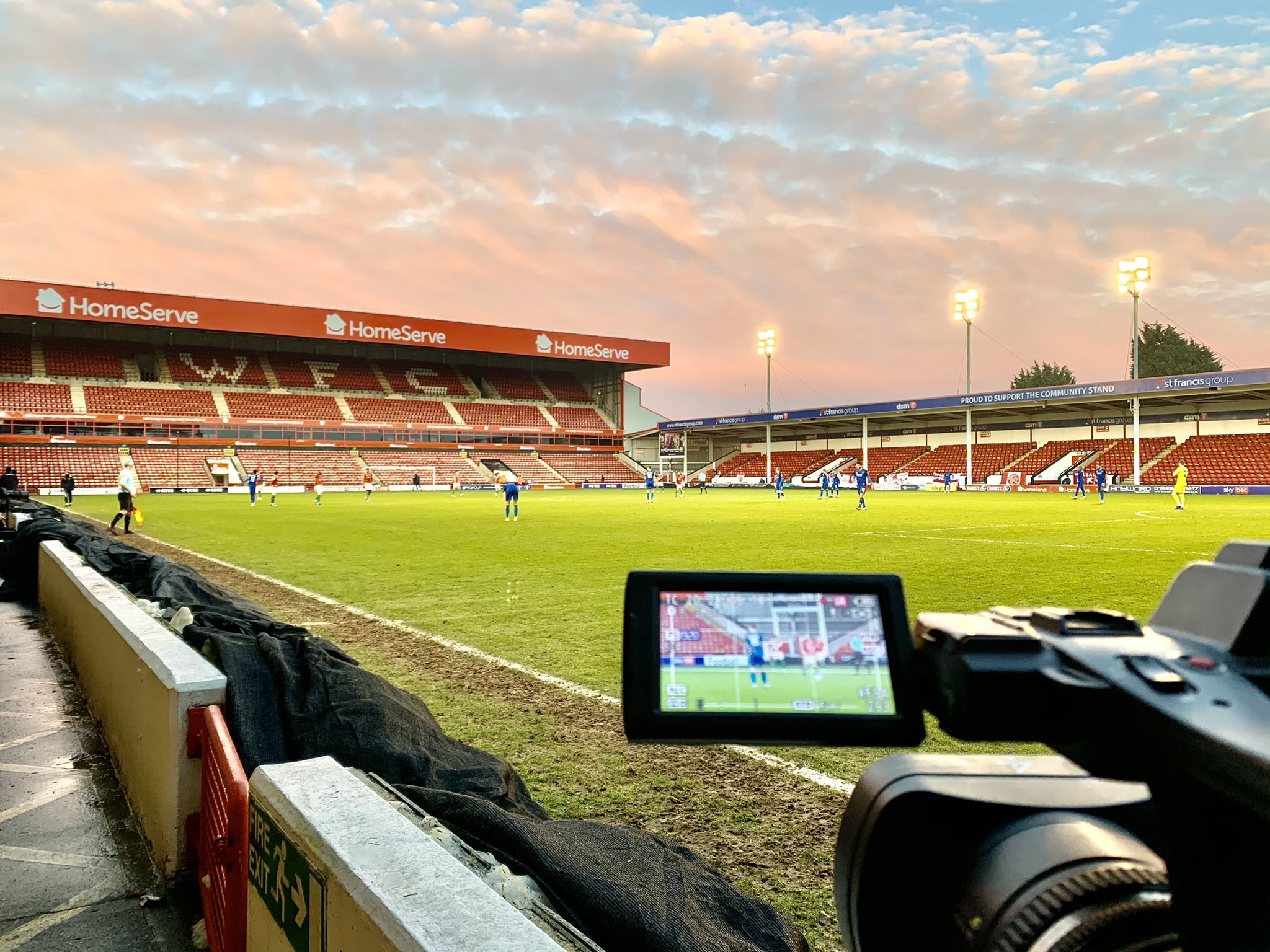
- Bescot Stadium hosted the final

Tournament details
- Country: England; Wales
- Dates: 27 August 2024 – 23 March 2025
- Teams: 72

Final positions
- Champions: Nottingham Forest (2nd title)
- Runners-up: Stoke City

Tournament statistics
- Matches played: 70
- Goals scored: 267 (3.81 per match)
- All statistics correct as of 22 March 2025.

The 2024–25 FA Women's National League Cup was the 33rd running of the FA Women's National League Cup, which began in 1991. It is the major league cup competition run by the FA Women's National League, and is run alongside their secondary league cup competition, the National League Plate.

All 72 National League clubs entered at the Determining round, with the winners continuing in the competition and the losers going into the National League Plate tournament.

Hashtag United were the defending champions, but were knocked out by eventual champions Nottingham Forest in the semi-finals.

The final was played on 22 March 2025 at Bescot Stadium between Nottingham Forest and Stoke City. Nottingham Forest secured a 3–1 victory to claim their second title in three seasons.

== Results ==
All results listed are published by The Football Association. Games are listed by round in chronological order, and then in alphabetical order of the home team where matches were played simultaneously.

The division each team play in is indicated in brackets after their name: (S)=Southern Division; (N)=Northern Division; (SW1)=South West Division One; (SE1)=South East Division One; (M1)=Midlands Division One; (N1)=Northern Division One.

=== Determining round ===
27 August 2024	AFC Sudbury (SE1)	1–4	Billericay Town (S)	Sudbury
19:45	Allen 10'	Report	Swaby 26'; Biggs 72', 81', 84'	Stadium: The Mel Group Stadium; Attendance: 98

27 August 2024	Hull City (N)	6–0	Lincoln City (M1)	Barton-upon-Humber
19:45	Ackroyd 20'; Brookes 15', 30', 40'; Knight 33'; Lynskey 35'	Report		Stadium: Easy Buy Stadium; Attendance: 123

27 August 2024	Northampton Town (M1)	3–2	Cambridge United (SE1)	Northampton
19:45	Richards 31'; Bell 40'; Pearson 90+4'	Report	Simmons 28', 64'	Stadium: Sixfields Stadium; Attendance: 351

28 August 2024	Abingdon United (SW1)	0–10	Oxford United (S)	Abingdon-on-Thames
19:45		Report	Richardson 14', 62'; Poole 26', 41'; Barratt 47' (pen.), 57', 90+3'; Cook 53'; Trinder 82'; Burridge 88'	Stadium: The Northcourt; Attendance: 204

28 August 2024	Barnsley (SW1)	1–0	Barnsley Women's (M1)	Barnsley
19:45	Evans 72'	Report		Stadium: Oakwell; Attendance: 459

28 August 2024	Burnley (N)	7–0	AFC Fylde (N1)	Barrowford
19:45	Elford 8', 35', 48'; Reidford 19'; Kelly 32'; Docherty 38'; Lord-Mears 51'	Report		Stadium: Victoria Park; Attendance: 94

28 August 2024	Chatham Town (SE1)	0–2	Hashtag United (S)	Chatham
19:45		Report	Turner 39'; Griffin 69'	Stadium: Maidstone Road Sports Ground; Attendance: 213

28 August 2024	Derby County (N)	2–1 (a.e.t.)	Loughborough Lightning (M1)	Mickleover
19:45	Jenkins 90+5'; Steggles 104'	Report	Delglyn 6' (pen.)	Stadium: Mickleover Sports Club; Attendance: 142

28 August 2024	Exeter City (S)	8–1	Portishead Town (SW1)	Newton Abbot
19:45	Baker 4', 35'; Grove 12'; Taylor 28'; Zuurmond 45', 46'; Franchi 49'; Gillies 90'	Report	Nicholson 68'	Stadium: Devon FA; Attendance: 166

28 August 2024	Gwalia United (S)	2–0	Bristol Rovers (SW1)	Newport
19:45	Jones 8'; Gauvain 78'	Report		Stadium: Newport Stadium; Attendance: 165

28 August 2024	Halifax (N)	0–2	Leeds United Women (N1)	Featherstone
19:45		Report	Danby 80'; Greene 87'	Stadium: Featherstone Miners Welfare Ground; Attendance: 398

28 August 2024	Lewes (S)	2–1 (a.e.t.)	Worthing (SE1)	Lewes
19:45	Proctor 8'; Carpenter 109'	Report	Quayle 32'	Stadium: The Dripping Pan; Attendance: 202

28 August 2024	Liverpool Feds (N)	3–2	Stockport County (N1)	Liverpool
19:45	Collins 7'; Kinvig 53', 68'	Report	Bentley 21'; Brady 83'	Stadium: Jericho Lane; Attendance: 115

28 August 2024	Middlesbrough (N1)	4–1	Durham Cestria (N1)	Redcar
19:45	Turnbull 12', 50'; Bell 16', 31'	Report	Brown 68'	Stadium: Green Lane; Attendance: 233

28 August 2024	Queens Park Rangers (SE1)	1–0 (a.e.t.)	AFC Wimbledon (S)	Hayes
19:45	Ward-Chambers 104' (pen.)	Report		Stadium: SkyEx Community Stadium; Attendance: 179

28 August 2024	Real Bedford (SE1)	3–0	Milton Keynes Dons (S)	Bedford
19:45	Mitchell 52'; Warren 63'; Meola 80'	Report		Stadium: Ledger Stadium; Attendance: 342

28 August 2024	Solihull Moors (M1)	A–W	West Bromwich Albion (N)
19:45		Report

28 August 2024	Sporting Khalsa (M1)	1–2	Sutton Coldfield Town (M1)	Willenhall
20:00	Deasy 74'	Report	Finn 65'; Hopwood 81'	Stadium: Guardian Warehousing Arena; Attendance: 164

28 August 2024	Swindon Town (SW1)	3–1	Keynsham Town (SW1)	Swindon
19:45	Colston 24'; Viveash 38'; Davies 90+6'	Report	Clipston 43' (pen.)	Stadium: Webbswood Stadium; Attendance: 73

28 August 2024	Wolverhampton Wanderers (N)	1–3	Stoke City (N)	Wellington
19:45	Greengrass 53'	Report	Ravening 65', 74' (pen.); Cole 80'	Stadium: SEAH Stadium; Attendance: 297

28 August 2024	York City (N1)	6–5	Norton & Stockton Ancients (N1)	Tadcaster
19:45	Singleton 15', 36'; Astle 32', 38', 88'; Rolandsen 53'	Report	Curle 20'; Owens 28', 58', 90+3'; Atkinson 42'	Stadium: Ings Lane; Attendance: 100

29 August 2024	Boldmere St. Michaels (M1)	1–2	Stourbridge (N)	Boldmere
19:45	Unknown 43'	Report	Clements 13'; Clark 49'	Stadium: Boldmere Community Stadium; Attendance: 110

29 August 2024	Chorley (N1)	1–2	Cheadle Town Stingers (N1)	Euxton
19:45	Worthington 72'	Report	Gillin 8'; Porteous-Williams 84' (pen.)	Stadium: Jim Fowler Memorial Ground; Attendance: 85

29 August 2024	Huddersfield Town (N1)	4–1	Doncaster Rovers Belles (N1)	Huddersfield
19:45	Unknown 22' (o.g.); Beresford 35'; Embley 64'; Lambert 89'	Report	Tugby-Andrew 17'	Stadium: Stafflex Arena; Attendance: 103

29 August 2024	London Bees (SE1)	2–1	Actonians (SE1)	Northolt
19:45	Charles 67'; Hoare 85'	Report	Page 84'	Stadium: Rectory Park; Attendance: 71

29 August 2024	London Seaward (SE1)	0–4	Dulwich Hamlet (SE1)	Barkingside
19:45		Report	Buchele 6', 44', 52'; Leitch 30'	Stadium: Techsoc.com Stadium

29 August 2024	Maidenhead United (SW1)	4–2	Ashford Town (Middlesex) (SE1)	Sandhurst
19:45	Walters 20'; Norfolk 32'; Cowell 64'; Stockton 66'	Report	Moore 47'; Neufville 81'	Stadium: SB Stadium; Attendance: 81

29 August 2024	Moneyfields (SW1)	4–3 (a.e.t.)	AFC Bournemouth (SW1)	Portsmouth
19:45	Wood 15', 94'; Burgess 28'; Albuery 118'	Report	Bloomfield 45'; Cooper 84'; James 98'	Stadium: John Jenkins Stadium; Attendance: 150

29 August 2024	Norwich City (SE1)	0–4	Ipswich Town (S)	Norwich
19:45		Report	Hughes 63'; Thomas 65'; Addison 73'; Peskett 83'	Stadium: Carrow Road; Attendance: 4,751

29 August 2024	Nottingham Forest (N)	6–0	Notts County Women (M1)	Nottingham
19:45	Galloway 50', 77'; Johnson 61'; Wellings 73'; Johnson 75'; Thomas 90+1'	Report		Stadium: Grange Park; Attendance: 444

29 August 2024	Peterborough United (M1)	3–0	Lincoln United (M1)	Bourne
19:45	Unknown 47' (o.g.); Perkins 58', 64'	Report		Stadium: Abbey Lawn; Attendance: 193

29 August 2024	Plymouth Argyle (S)	4–2	Bridgwater United (SW1)	Newton Abbot
19:00	Papaioannou 10'; Wilson 61'; Sara 63' (pen.), 68'	Report	Everson 15'; Bedford 47'	Stadium: Devon FA; Attendance: 145

29 August 2024	Worcester City (M1)	1–0	Cheltenham Town (S)	Worcester
19:45	Mitcham 69'	Report		Stadium: Sixways Stadium; Attendance: 181

29 August 2024	Leafield Athletic (M1)	0–7	Rugby Borough (N)	Birmingham
20:00		Report	Greenslade 18'; Moncaster 48', 79'; Wood 70', 74'; Iton 81', 83'	Stadium: Castle Vale Stadium; Attendance: 70

5 September 2024	Chesham United (SE1)	1–7	Watford (S)	Chesham
19:45	Fraser 12'	Report	Lazaro 17'; Wilson 20'; Hall 25'; Gale 53', 56'; Paul 72'; McLean 90'	Stadium: The Meadow; Attendance: 55

10 September 2024	Southampton Women's (SW1)	1–0	Bournemouth Sports (SW1)	Southampton
19:45	Lynn 90+4'	Report		Stadium: Miller Park

=== Preliminary round ===
15 September 2024	Plymouth Argyle (S)	3–0	London Bees (SE1)	Plymouth
14:00	Wilson 13', 41'; Whitmore 36'	Report		Stadium: Home Park; Attendance: 535

15 September 2024	Southampton Women's (SW1)	0–3	Moneyfields (SW1)	Basingstoke
14:00		Report	Jeal 59', 61'; Wilson-Wilton 79'	Stadium: Winklebury Football Complex

15 September 2024	Stourbridge (N)	1–4	Middlesbrough (N1)	Stourbridge
14:00	Bennett-Steele 35'	Report	Mett 16'; Robson 40', 69'; Towers 52'	Stadium: War Memorial Athletic Ground; Attendance: 86

15 September 2024	York City (N)	1–3	Huddersfield Town (N1)	Tadcaster
14:00	Rolandsen 5'	Report	McMahon 14'; Beresford 68'; Tiripke 90+4'	Stadium: Ings Lane; Attendance: 0

=== First round ===
29 September 2024	Barnsley (N1)	0–5	Stoke City (N)	Barnsley
14:00		Report	Ravening 20', 67'; Wilcock 46'; Stamps 73'; Cole 82'	Stadium: Oakwell; Attendance: 97

29 September 2024	Billericay Town (S)	3–3 (a.e.t.) (4–2 p)	Oxford United (S)	Billericay
14:00	Houghton 59' (pen.), 111'; Grant 81'	Report	Sealey 5'; Barratt 68'; King 118'	Stadium: New Lodge; Attendance: 150
	Penalties
	Penalty missed Penalty scored		(penalty missed) Gotch; (penalty scored) Burridge; (penalty scored) Barratt; (penalty missed) Gibson

29 September 2024	Cheadle Town Stingers (N1)	0–1	Nottingham Forest (N)	Cheadle
14:00		Report	Domingo 82'	Stadium: Ground Up Solutions Stadium; Attendance: 177

29 September 2024	Derby County (N)	0–3	Hashtag United (S)	Mickleover
14:00		Report	Turner 45', 90'; Ayisi 49'	Stadium: Mickleover Sports Club; Attendance: 152

29 September 2024	Exeter City (S)	1–3	Ipswich Town (S)	Exeter
14:00	Stacey 39'	Report	Rutherford 12'; Addison 57'; Fisher 86'	Stadium: Exwick Sports Hub; Attendance: 402

29 September 2024	Gwalia United (S)	1–2	Real Bedford (SE1)	Newport
14:00	Williams-Mills 44' (pen.)	Report	Puddick 72'; Stovold 88'	Stadium: Newport Stadium; Attendance: 110

29 September 2024	Huddersfield Town (N1)	1–3	Hull City (N)	Huddersfield
14:00	Embley 26'	Report	Green 16'; Knight 48'; Brookes 72'	Stadium: Stafflex Arena; Attendance: 79

29 September 2024	Lewes (S)	0–1	Watford (S)	Lewes
14:00		Report	Hall 70'	Stadium: The Dripping Pan; Attendance: 428

29 September 2024	Maidenhead United (SW1)	1–4	Plymouth Argyle (S)	Maidenhead
14:00	Mayani 80'	Report	Dickson 3'; Kuyken 45'; Whitmore 52'; Sara 83'	Stadium: York Road; Attendance: 55

29 September 2024	Middlesbrough (N1)	2–0	Leeds United Women (N1)	Stockton-on-Tees
14:00	Bell 20'; Turnbull 85'	Report		Stadium: Bishopton Road West; Attendance: 289

29 September 2024	Moneyfields (SW1)	2–0	Dulwich Hamlet (SE1)	Portsmouth
14:00	Fuller 28'; Unknown 50' (o.g.)	Report		Stadium: John Jenkins Stadium

29 September 2024	Peterborough United (M1)	3–0	Worcester City (M1)	Bourne
14:00	Connor 6'; Meli 18'; Bennett 45'	Report		Stadium: Abbey Lawn; Attendance: 225

29 September 2024	Queens Park Rangers (SE1)	2–0	Swindon Town (SW1)	Hayes
14:00	Hoile 44'; Dzyadyk 60'	Report		Stadium: SkyEx Community Stadium

29 September 2024	Rugby Borough (N)	0–1	Liverpool Feds (N)	Rugby
14:00		Report	Cole 8'	Stadium: Nationwide Windows Arena; Attendance: 201

29 September 2024	Sutton Coldfield Town (M1)	0–1	Burnley (N)	Sutton Coldfield
14:00		Report	Unknown 22' (o.g.)	Stadium: Central Ground; Attendance: 73

29 September 2024	West Bromwich Albion (N)	3–3 (a.e.t.) (3–2 p)	Northampton Town (M1)	Redditch
14:00	Jhamat 60', 120'; May 94'	Report	Pearson 81'; Richards 97'; Bell 109'	Stadium: Valley Stadium; Attendance: 101
	Penalties
	(penalty scored) Mahmood; (penalty missed) Warner; (penalty missed) George; (penalty scored) Watkins; (penalty scored) Jhamat		(penalty missed) Pearson; (penalty scored) Noble; (penalty missed) McLean; (penalty scored) Bell; (penalty missed) Luttman

=== Second round ===
20 October 2024	Hull City (N)	0–1	Burnley (N)	Barton-upon-Humber
14:00		Report	Hartley 57'	Stadium: Easy Buy Stadium; Attendance: 167

20 October 2024	Ipswich Town (S)	0–1	Hashtag United (S)	Felixstowe
14:00		Report	Unknown 37' (o.g.)	Stadium: The Martello Ground; Attendance: 532

20 October 2024	Middlesbrough (N1)	1–0	West Bromwich Albion (N)	Stockton-on-Tees
14:00	Robson 27'	Report		Stadium: Bishopton Road West; Attendance: 202

20 October 2024	Moneyfields (SW1)	1–5	Real Bedford (SE1)	Portsmouth
14:00	Albuery 60'	Report	Bensted 13'; Meola 55'; McLean 58'; Gould 65'; Wilson 88'	Stadium: John Jenkins Stadium; Attendance: 51

20 October 2024	Nottingham Forest (N)	6–0	Peterborough United (M1)	West Bridgford
14:00	Wellings 11'; Johnson 42', 55'; Galloway 67'; Domingo 86'; Chandarana 90+4'	Report		Stadium: City Ground; Attendance: 223

20 October 2024	Plymouth Argyle (S)	2–1	Billericay Town (S)	Plymouth
14:00	Whitmore 42'; Wilson 64'	Report	Harwood 9'	Stadium: Home Park; Attendance: 300

20 October 2024	Stoke City (N)	3–1 (a.e.t.)	Liverpool Feds (N)	Newcastle-under-Lyme
14:00	Ravening 39', 93', 114'	Report	Donoghue 77'	Stadium: Clayton Wood; Attendance: 81

20 October 2024	Watford (S)	6–1	Queens Park Rangers (SE1)	Ruislip
14:00	McLean 7'; Chandler 18'; Fyfe 36', 90+2'; Hall 68'; Filbey 78'	Report	Ward-Chambers 20'	Stadium: Grosvenor Vale; Attendance: 193

=== Quarter-finals ===
1 December 2024	Hashtag United (S)	4–0	Real Bedford (SE1)	Aveley
14:00	West 2'; Finlayson 13'; Keogh 56'; Apindia 68' (pen.)	Report		Stadium: Parkside

1 December 2024	Plymouth Argyle (S)	1–0	Watford (S)	Plymouth
14:00	Jarvis 29'	Report		Stadium: Home Park; Attendance: 597

14 December 2024	Burnley (N)	0–1	Stoke City (N)	Leyland
13:00		Report	Ravening 52'	Stadium: County Ground

15 December 2024	Middlesbrough (N1)	1–2	Nottingham Forest (N)	Stockton-on-Tees
14:00	Robson 68'	Report	Wellings 15'; Thomas 74'	Stadium: Bishopton Road West; Attendance: 337

=== Semi-finals ===
26 January 2025	Plymouth Argyle (S)	0–3	Stoke City (N)	Plymouth
14:00		Report	Dickson 30' (o.g.); Stamps 48'; Wilcock 60'	Stadium: Home Park; Attendance: 633

26 January 2025	Hashtag United (S)	0–1	Nottingham Forest (N)	Aveley
15:00		Report	Wellings 86' (pen.)	Stadium: Parkside

=== Final ===
22 March 2025	Stoke City (N)	1–3	Nottingham Forest (N)	Walsall
15:30	Wilcock 72'	Report	Wellings 29', 32'; Johnson 80'	Stadium: Bescot Stadium; Attendance: 1,718
