= Melissa Johnson =

Jamaican footballer (born 1991)

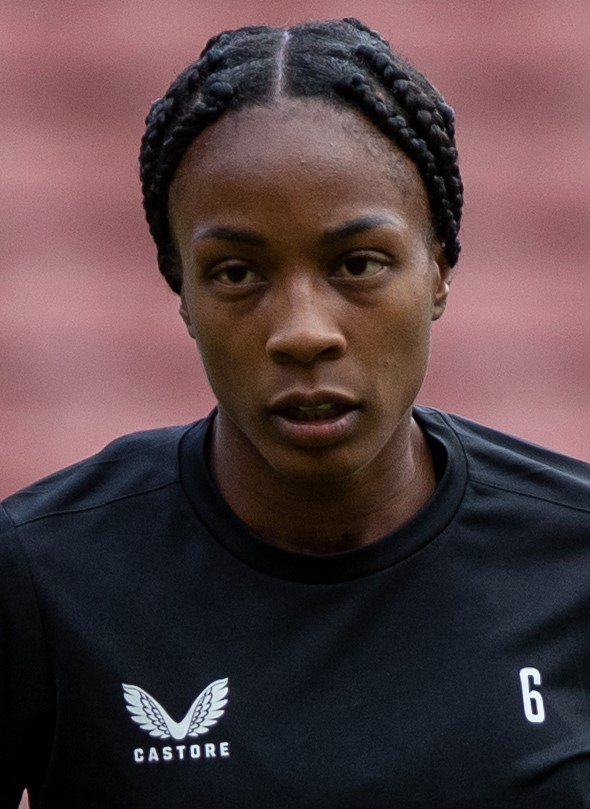
- Johnson in 2022

Personal information
- Full name: Melissa Gem Johnson
- Date of birth: 11 August 1991 (age 35)
- Place of birth: London
- Position: Forward

Team information
- Current team: Nottingham Forest
- Number: 9

Senior career*
Years	Team	Apps	(Gls)
2017–2018	Sheffield	15	(12)
2018–2019	Leicester City	19	(5)
2019–2020	Aston Villa	14	(12)
2020–2021	Sheffield United	15	(5)
2021–2022	Bristol City	17	(4)
2022–2024	Charlton Athletic	43	(15)
2024–	Nottingham Forest	22	(21)

International career^{‡}
2023–	Jamaica	5	(1)
- * Club domestic league appearances and goals as of 8 May 2025 ‡ National team caps and goals as of 19 August 2024

Melissa Gem Johnson (born 11 August 1991) is a professional footballer who plays as a forward for Nottingham Forest in the Women's Super League 2. Born in England, she plays for the Jamaica women's national team.

== Club career ==
=== Sheffield FC ===
Playing for Sheffield FC in the 2017–18 FA WSL 2, Johnson finished as second top-scorer in the league with 12 goals in 15 appearances in the second-tier competition. She was named WSL 2 Player of the Month for January 2018 and again in May 2018.

=== Leicester City ===
In August 2018 Johnson (and Freda Ayisi) joined Leicester City for the 2018–19 season.

=== Aston Villa ===
In October 2019 she attracted attention after scoring three hat-tricks for Aston Villa in the opening five games of the 2019–20 season earning a nomination for the September FA Women's Championship Player of the Month award. While the season was uncompleted after 14 games due to the COVID-19 pandemic, at the time of the competition's completion Johnson was the second top-scorer with 12 goals.

=== Sheffield United ===
Johnson returned to Sheffield to represent Sheffield United in August 2020, scoring five goals for the club in 15 league appearances in the 2020–21 season. Johnson announced her departure from Sheffield United in May 2021.

=== Bristol City ===
On 10 August 2021, it was announced that Johnson had joined recently relegated Bristol City ahead of the 2021–22 season.

=== Charlton Athletic ===
On 6 August 2022, Johnson signed for Charlton Athletic on a one-year contract. On 18 July 2023, Johnson signed a new one-year contract.

=== Nottingham Forest ===
On 15 July 2024, Johnson signed for Nottingham Forest on a one-year contract.

== Career statistics ==
As of match played 1 November 2026

Club	Season	League			National Cup		League Cup		Total	
Club	Season	Division	Apps	Goals	Apps	Goals	Apps	Goals	Apps	Goals
Sheffield	2017–18	FA WSL 2	15	12	0	0	4 (Note: Appearances in the FA Women's League Cup)	4	19	16
Leicester City	2018–19	Women's Championship	19	5	0	0	5	1	24	6
Aston Villa	2019–20	Women's Championship	14	12	0	0	5	1	19	13
Sheffield United	2020–21	Women's Championship	15	5	0	0	3	1	18	6
Bristol City	2021–22	Women's Championship	17	4	1	0	4	1	22	5
Charlton Athletic	2022–23	Women's Championship	22	12	2	1	3	0	27	13
Charlton Athletic	2023-24	Women's Championship	21	3	2	2	3	0	26	5
Charlton Athletic	Total		43	15	4	3	6	0	53	18
Nottingham Forest	2024–25	FA WNL Northern Premier Division	22	21	4	2	6	4	32	27
Nottingham Forest	2025–26	Women's Super League 2	0	0	0	0	0	0	0	0
Nottingham Forest	2026–27	Women's Super League 2	0	0	0	0	2	1	2	1
Nottingham Forest	Total		22	21	4	2	8	5	34	28
Career total			145	74	9	5	35	13	189	92

== International goals ==
No.	Date	Venue	Opponent	Score	Result	Competition
1.	29 October 2023	Independence Park, Kingston, Jamaica	Guatemala	1–1	2–2	2024 CONCACAF W Gold Cup qualification

== Honours ==
=== Club ===
Nottingham Forest

- FA Women's National League North: 2024-25
- FA Women's National League Cup: 2024-25
