= Freya Thomas =

English footballer (born 2001)

Personal information
- Full name: Freya Dee Thomas
- Date of birth: 28 October 2001 (age 25)
- Place of birth: Coventry, England
- Height: 1.61 m (5 ft 3 in)
- Position: Midfielder

Team information
- Current team: Nottingham Forest
- Number: 17

Senior career*
Years	Team	Apps	(Gls)
2018–2021	Leicester City	25	(1)
2021	Nottingham Forest	9	(2)
2021–2023	Coventry United	28	(0)
2023–	Nottingham Forest	59	(9)
- * Club domestic league appearances and goals as of 15 November 2026

Freya Dee Thomas (born 28 October 2001) is an English footballer who plays as a midfielder for Nottingham Forest in the Women's Super League 2.

== Club career ==
=== Nottingham Forest ===
On 7 August 2023, Thomas signed for Nottingham Forest.

On 21 June 2024, Thomas signed a new two-year deal to extend her stay at Nottingham Forest.

== Career statistics ==
=== Club ===
As of match played 18 November 2026

Club	Season	League			FA Cup		League Cup		Total	
Club	Season	Division	Apps	Goals	Apps	Goals	Apps	Goals	Apps	Goals
Leicester City	2018–19	Women's Championship	6	0	0	0	1 (Note: Appearances in the FA Women's League Cup)	0	7	0
Leicester City	2019–20	Women's Championship	13	1	0	0	2	0	15	1
Leicester City	2020–21	Women's Championship	6	0	0	0	2	0	8	0
Leicester City	Total		25	1	0	0	5	0	30	1
Nottingham Forest	2021–22	FA WNL Northern Premier Division	9	2	0	0	0 (Note: Appearances in the FA Women's National League Plate)	0	9	2
Coventry United	2021–22	Women's Championship	13	0	1	0	1	0	15	0
Coventry United	2022–23	Women's Championship	15	0	1	1	1	0	17	1
Coventry United	Total		28	0	2	1	2	0	32	1
Nottingham Forest	2023–24	FA WNL Northern Premier Division	21	4	4	1	3 (Note: Appearances in the FA Women's National League Cup)	0	28	5
Nottingham Forest	2024–25	FA WNL Northern Premier Division	20	3	4	5	6	2	30	10
Nottingham Forest	2025–26	Women's Super League 2	10	1	0	0	3	0	13	1
Nottingham Forest	2026–27	Women's Super League 2	8	1	0	0	3	0	11	1
Nottingham Forest	Total		59	9	8	6	15	2	82	17
Nottingham Forest Total			68	11	8	6	15	2	91	19
Career total			121	12	10	7	22	2	153	21

== Honours ==
=== Club ===
Nottingham Forest

- FA Women's National League North: 2024-25
- FA Women's National League Cup: 2024-25
