= Casey Howe =

Northern Irish footballer

Personal information
- Full name: Casey Howe
- Date of birth: 2 September 2002 (age 24)
- Place of birth: Enniskillen, Northern Ireland,
- Height: 1.63 m (5 ft 4 in)
- Position: Centre-forward

Team information
- Current team: Celtic

Youth career
- 2009–2016: Ballinamallard United F.C.
- 2016–2018: Linfield

Senior career*
Years	Team	Apps	(Gls)
2018–2021	Linfield	24	(21)
2021–2023	Glentoran	16	(13)
2023	Sligo Rovers	25	(13)
2024	Athlone Town	10	(8)
2024–2026	Nottingham Forest	7	(1)
2026	→ Wolverhampton Wanderers (loan)	6	(0)
2026–	Celtic	0	(0)

International career^{‡}
2017–2019	Northern Ireland U17	8	(0)
2019–	Northern Ireland U18	1	(0)
2019–	Northern Ireland U19	3	(0)
2020–	Northern Ireland	16	(0)
- * Club domestic league appearances and goals as of 4 June 2026 ‡ National team caps and goals as of 18 October 2026

Casey Howe (born 2 September 2002) is a Northern Irish association footballer who plays as a centre forward for Scottish Women's Premier League club Celtic and the Northern Ireland women's national team. She previously played for Linfield, Glentoran, Sligo Rovers, Athlone Town, Nottingham Forest and Wolves

== Club Career ==
Howe played for Northern Irish clubs Linfield and Glentoran before moving to Sligo Rovers she spent the 2023 League of Ireland Women's Premier Division season with the club she played 25 games scoring 13 goals. She then moved to Athlone Town for the 2024 season she scored 8 goals in 10 appearances before moving over to England.

She signed with English side Nottingham Forest she spent the 2024–25 and 2025–26 seasons with the club she played ten matches scoring one goal. She was loaned out to Wolves for the second half of the 2025–26 season she helped the club receive promotion to WSL 2. She departed Nottingham Forest in June 2026 after the conclusion of the 2025–26 season.

On 8 July 2026, Howe signed for Celtic in the SWPL on a 2 year deal.

== International Career ==
Howe played at youth level for Northern Ireland, She went on to make her international debut in a Pinatar Cup match against Iceland in 2020.
