= Charlie Wellings =

English association football player

Personal information
- Full name: Charlie Louise Wellings
- Date of birth: 18 May 1998 (age 28)
- Place of birth: Walsall, England
- Height: 1.65 m (5 ft 5 in)
- Position: Forward

Youth career
- 2011–2015: Birmingham City

Senior career*
Years	Team	Apps	(Gls)
2015–2019	Birmingham City	59	(10)
2019–2021	Bristol City	33	(3)
2021–2022	Celtic	10	(11)
2022–2024	Reading	28	(6)
2024–2026	Nottingham Forest	36	(19)
2026–	Burnley	0	(0)

International career^{‡}
2017–2018	England U20	4	(0)
2019	England U21	6	(4)
- * Club domestic league appearances and goals as of 4 May 2026 ‡ National team caps and goals as of 16 January 2020

Charlie Louise Wellings (born 18 May 1998) is an English professional footballer who plays as a striker for Burnley.

Wellings has previously played for Birmingham City and Bristol City of the Women's Super League, Celtic of the Scottish Women's Premier League and Reading in the Women's Championship.

== Club career ==
=== Birmingham City ===
On 24 March 2015, Wellings signed her first senior contract at Birmingham City WFC. Wellings made her debut on 2 July 2014 during a WSL Cup match against Oxford United, coming on as a 75th-minute substitute replacing Karen Carney. Wellings did not make her league debut until the 2015 FA WSL where she started against Liverpool F.C. Women in a 2–1 loss. Wellings' first goal was in a 7–1 win against Aston Villa in the WSL Cup, scoring in the 91st minute.

In May 2017, she scored in Birmingham City's 4–1 2017 FA Women's Cup Final defeat by Manchester City at Wembley Stadium, the club's first ever goal at Wembley.

=== Bristol City ===
On 28 May 2019, Wellings left childhood club Birmingham and signed a pre-contract agreement with fellow FA WSL team Bristol City, the same day as Birmingham teammate Meaghan Sargeant. Bristol are managed by former Birmingham assistant Tanya Oxtoby. On 7 September 2019, Wellings made her debut for Bristol City W.F.C. in a 0–0 home draw against Brighton & Hove Albion in the FA WSL.

=== Celtic ===
Wellings signed for Celtic in July 2021. She made an impressive start to her career in Scotland; scoring twice in a 4–2 win over Aberdeen in the opening league match of the season on 5 September 2021, and by mid-October she had scored 11 goals in 10 games.

=== Reading ===
On 5 August 2022, Reading announced the double signing of Wellings. On 2 July 2024, Wellings was one of the players released by Reading following their voluntary demotion to the fifth tier Southern Region Women's Football League.

=== Nottingham Forest ===
On 19 July 2024, Wellings signed a one-year deal with FA Women's National League North club Nottingham Forest.

On 22 March 2025, Wellings scored a brace, helping Forest to a 3–1 victory over Stoke City in the FA Women's National League Cup final. She won back-to-back club player of the month awards in March and April 2025.

On 14 July 2026, Wellings was announced at Burnley.

== International career ==
In August 2018, Wellings represented England at the 2018 FIFA U-20 Women's World Cup. The team finished in third place, losing the semi-final to Japan before beating France on penalties in the third place playoff. It was the team's best ever result. On 5 April, Wellings made her debut for the U21 team in a 2–1 win against France U23, where she scored both goals. Later that year in October, Wellings as well as teammate Sophie Baggaley were called up to the England U21 team again.

== Career statistics ==
=== Club ===
As of 4 May 2026

Appearances and goals by club, season and competition
Club	Season	League			League Cup		FA Cup		Europe		Total	
Club	Season	Division	Apps	Goals	Apps	Goals	Apps	Goals	Apps	Goals	Apps	Goals
Birmingham City	2014	FA WSL	0	0	1	0	—		-		1	0
Birmingham City	2015	FA WSL	6	0	6	2	1	0	-		13	2
Birmingham City	2016	FA WSL	14	2	4	1	1	1	-		19	4
Birmingham City	2017	FA WSL	7	1	0	0	—		-		7	1
Birmingham City	2017–18	FA WSL	18	4	4	2	2	0	-		24	6
Birmingham City	2018–19	FA WSL	20	4	5	2	2	0	-		27	6
Birmingham City	Total		65	11	20	7	6	1	-		91	19
Bristol City	2019–20	FA WSL	13	1	5	2	2	0	-		20	3
Bristol City	2020–21	FA WSL	20	2	5	2	1	0	-		26	4
Bristol City	Total		33	3	10	4	3	0	-		46	7
Celtic	2021–22	SWPL	10	11	1	0	4	8	2	0	17	19
Celtic	Total		10	11	1	0	4	8	2	0	17	19
Reading	2022–23	FA WSL	20	4	3	1	3	0	-		26	5
Reading	2023–24	Women's Championship	8	2	2	2	2	1	-		12	5
Reading	Total		28	6	5	3	5	1	-	-	38	10
Nottingham Forest	2024–25	FA WNL Northern Premier Division	22	16	6 (Note: Appearances in the FA Women's National League Cup)	6	4	5	-		32	27
Nottingham Forest	2025–26	Women's Super League 2	14	3	1	0	1	0	-		16	3
Nottingham Forest	Total		36	19	7	6	5	5	-	-	48	30
Career total			172	50	43	20	23	15	2	0	240	85

== Honours ==
=== Club ===
Celtic

- SWPL League Cup: 2022

Nottingham Forest

- FA Women's National League North: 2024-25
- FA Women's National League Cup: 2024-25
