= Bridget Galloway =

English footballer

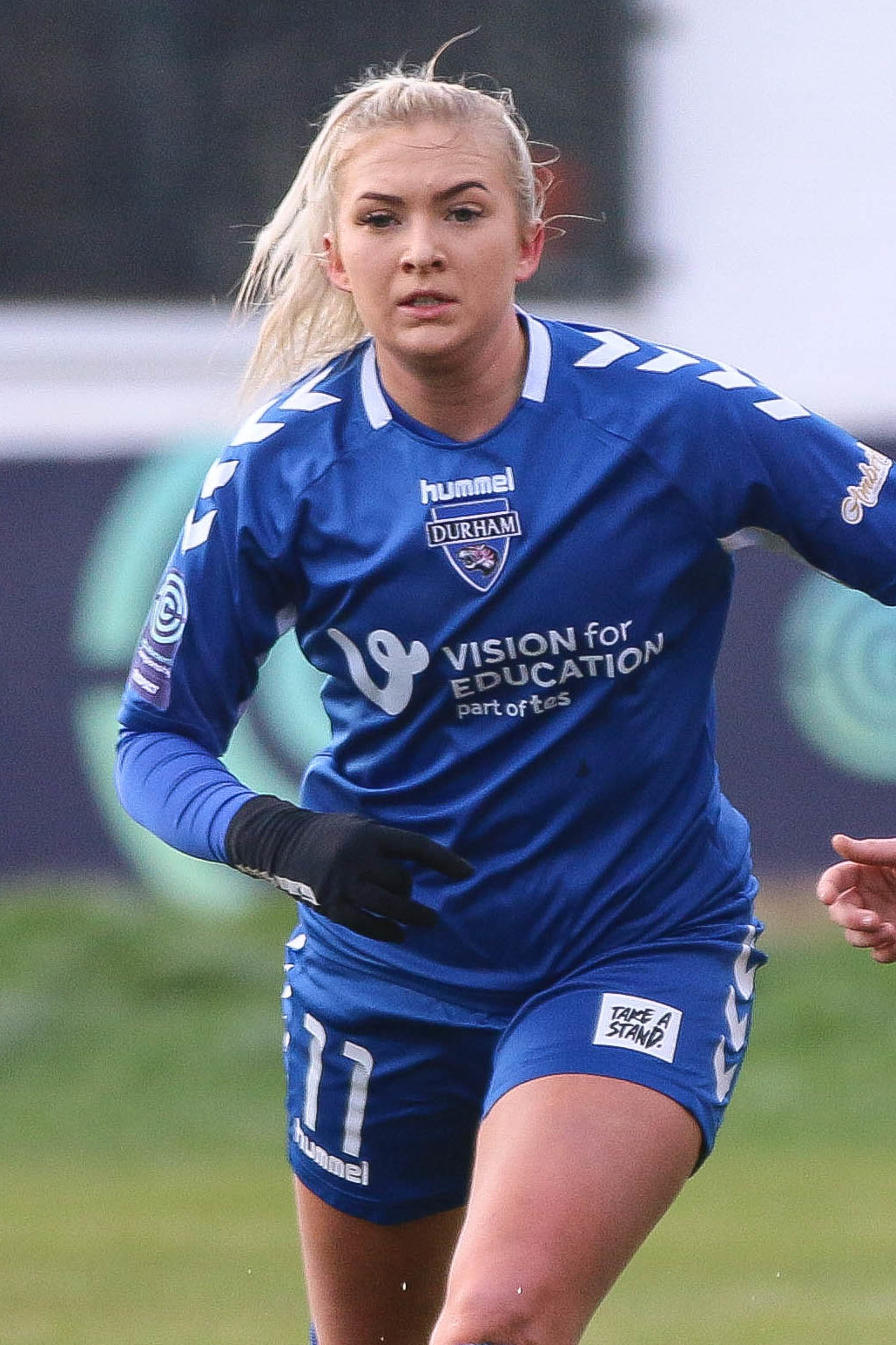
- Galloway playing for Durham in 2021

Personal information
- Full name: Bridget Galloway
- Date of birth: 19 July 1999 (age 27)
- Place of birth: Gateshead, England
- Position: Striker

Team information
- Current team: Middlesbrough

Youth career
- 2010–2012: Newcastle United
- 2012–2016: Sunderland

Senior career*
Years	Team	Apps	(Gls)
2016–2020	Sunderland	51	(37)
2020–2023	Durham	34	(6)
2023–2024	Newcastle United	21	(11)
2024–2025	Nottingham Forest	10	(2)
2025–2026	Aberdeen	20	(4)
2026–	Middlesbrough	0	(0)

International career
2018	England U19	7	(2)
- * Club domestic league appearances and goals as of 1:00, 29 June 2026 (UTC)

Bridget Galloway (born 19 July 1999) is an English footballer who plays as a forward for National League North club Middlesbrough. She has represented England at under-19 level.

== Club career ==
=== Sunderland ===
Galloway made her first team debut for Sunderland on 29 October 2016, replacing Beth Mead in the 80th minute of a 0–0 draw with Notts County in the WSL 1.

Galloway's first team involvement increased in 2017–18. She scored her penalty in a WSL Cup shoot-out win against Sheffield F.C. on 16 November 2018. She scored her first goal on 5 December 2017 in a 1–0 WSL Cup win against Liverpool, heading in the eventual winner. Her first league goal came five days later in a 5–1 defeat at Everton in the WSL 1. On 20 May 2018, Galloway scored Sunderland's last WSL 1 goal with a winner on the last day of the season against Yeovil Town.

Following Sunderland's demotion to the FA Women's National League, Galloway scored the team's first goal of the 2018–19 season, scoring a penalty against Bradford City on 26 August 2018. She scored her first senior hat-trick on 18 November 2018 in a 5–2 home win against Derby County.

=== Durham ===
After two seasons in the National League with Sunderland, Galloway joined Championship club Durham on 14 July 2020. She scored her first goal for the club on 7 October, during a 5–2 League Cup win against Coventry United.

=== Newcastle United ===
Galloway moved to Newcastle United on 14 July 2023. She scored her first and second competitive goals for the club on 27 August, during a 3–2 National League Cup win against Burnley. She ended the season as the club's top goalscorer, helping win the 2023–24 National League North, and promotion to the WSL 2.

=== Nottingham Forest ===
Nottingham Forest announced the signing of Galloway on a one year contract on 6 August 2024. She scored her first goal for the club on 25 August, the last goal of a 7–0 win against Sporting Khalsa. She was part of the team that won both the 2024–25 National League North, and the 2024–25 National League Cup.

=== Aberdeen ===
Galloway joined Scottish Premier League side Aberdeen on 6 August 2025. She made her league debut on 31 August against Montrose, and scored her first goal for the club on 7 September, during a 1–1 draw with Partick Thistle.

=== Middlesbrough ===
On 29 June 2026, Middlesbrough announced the signing of Galloway.

== International career ==
Galloway has represented England at under-19 level. She received her first call-up in January 2018 before making her debut against Ireland on 19 January 2018. She scored her first goal for England on 4 March 2018 in a 4–3 win over the Czech Republic. She got her second goal for the under-19's in the UEFA Women's Under-19 Championship qualifying round, scoring the opening goal in a 4–1 win against Israel on 3 April 2018.

== Career statistics ==
=== Club ===
As of 22 July 2021.

Appearances and goals by club, season and competition
Club	Season	League			FA Cup		League Cup (Note: Includes the FA Women's National League Cup, FA Women's League Cup, and Scottish Women's Premier League Cup.)		Total	
Club	Season	Division	Apps	Goals	Apps	Goals	Apps	Goals	Apps	Goals
Sunderland	2016	Super League	1	0	2	0	0	0	3	0
Sunderland	2017	Super League	1	0	—		—		1	0
Sunderland	2017–18	Super League	12	3	3	1	3	2	18	6
Sunderland	2018–19	National League North	24	17	1	0	3	1	28	18
Sunderland	2019–20	National League North	13	17	4	2	6	2	23	21
Sunderland	Total		51	37	10	3	12	5	73	45
Durham	2020–21	Championship	20	5	0	0	4	2	24	7
Newcastle United	2023–24	National League North	21	11	4	3	6	3	31	17
Nottingham Forest	2024–25	National League North	10	2	4	5	5	3	19	10
Aberdeen	2025–26	Scottish Premier League	20	4	0	0	2	0	22	4
Career total			122	59	18	11	29	13	169	83

== Honours ==
Newcastle United

- National League North: 2023–24

Nottingham Forest

- National League North: 2024–25
- National League Cup: 2024–25
