= Sophie McLean =

English footballer

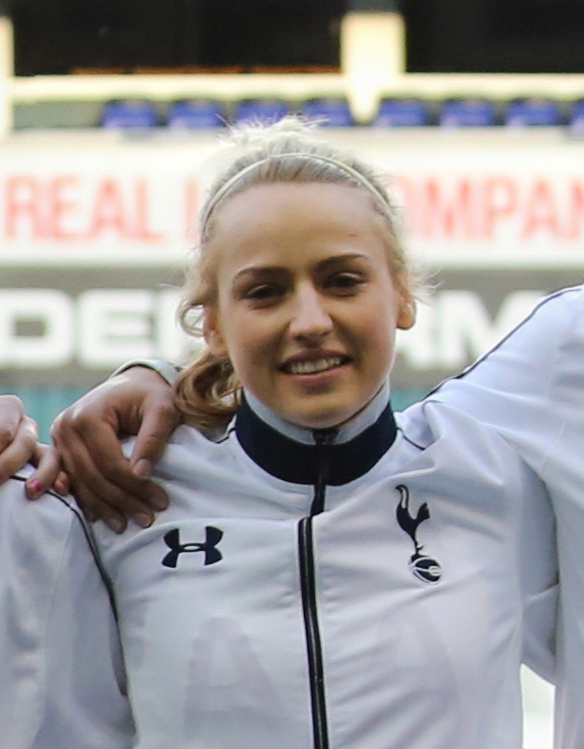

Personal information
- Date of birth: 11 February 1996 (age 30)
- Place of birth: England
- Position: Midfielder

Team information
- Current team: Watford
- Number: 6

Senior career*
Years	Team	Apps	(Gls)
2017–2020	Tottenham Hotspur	32	(0)
2020–2021	London Bees	19	(3)
2021–2022	Crystal Palace	20	(3)
2022–23	Billericay Town	11	(1)
2023–	Watford	22	(2)
- * Club domestic league appearances and goals

Sophie McLean (born 11 February 1996) is an English footballer who plays as a midfielder for Watford in the FA Women's National League South.
