= Naomi Bedeau =

English footballer (born 2000)

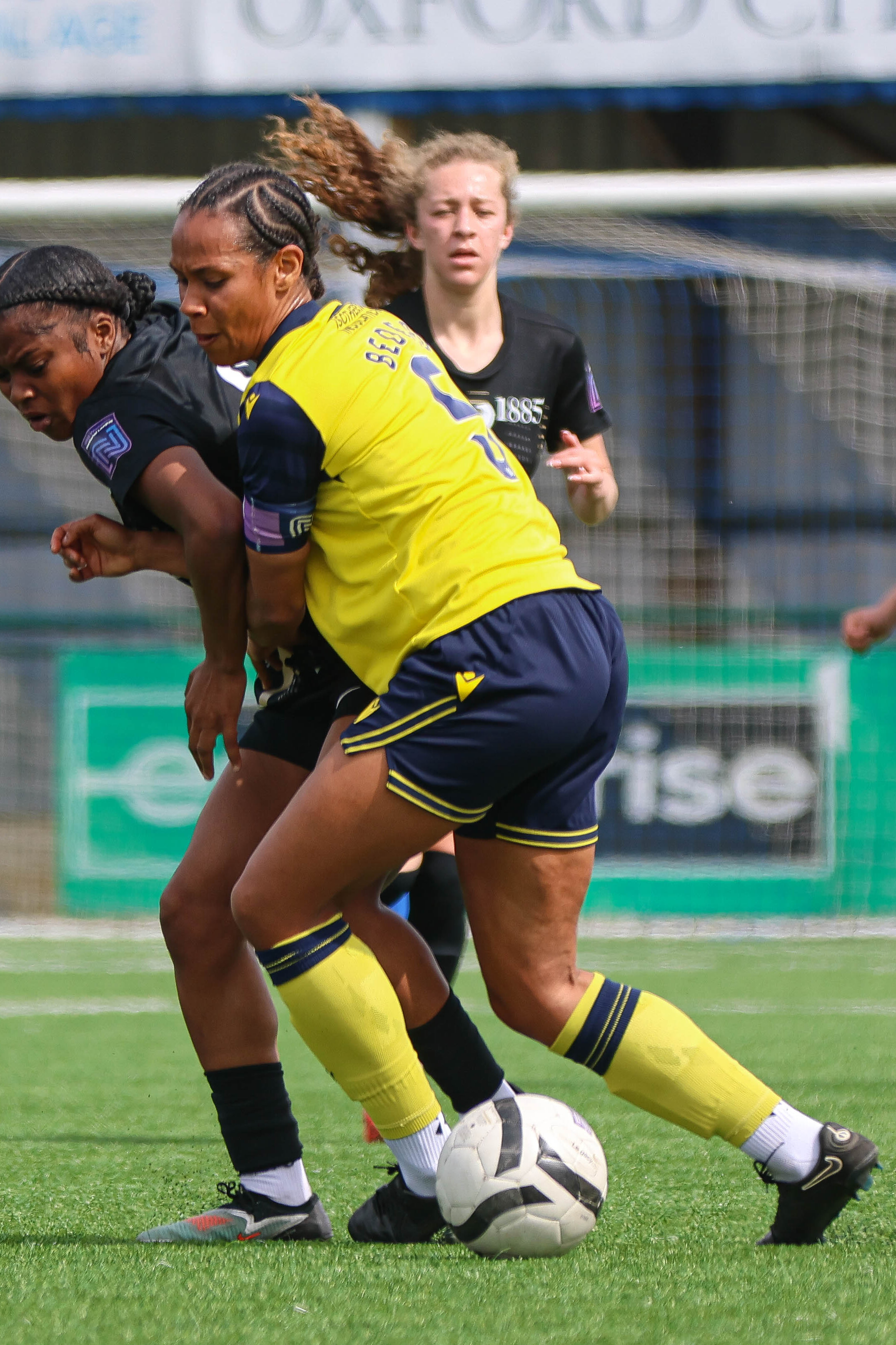
- Bedeau with Oxford United

Personal information
- Date of birth: 24 November 2000 (age 25)
- Position: Central defender

Team information
- Current team: Oxford United

Senior career*
| Years | Team | Apps | (Gls) |
| 2020–2021 | Ipswich Town | | |
| 2021–2023 | Stoke City | | |
| 2023 | Wolverhampton Wanderers | | |
| 2023–2024 | Newcastle United | | |
| 2024–2025 | Nottingham Forest | | |
| 2025– | Oxford United | | |

International career
| 2025– | Grenada | | |
- * Club domestic league appearances and goals

Naomi Bedeau (born 24 November 2000) is an English professional footballer who captained the Grenada women's national football team in 2025. She represents Oxford United. She was a central defender for Nottingham Forest in the Women's Super League 2. She has played for Ipswich Town, Stoke City, Wolverhampton Wanderers, and Newcastle United in the FA Women's National League system.

== Early career ==
Bedeau began her football career with Ipswich Town before transferring to Stoke City.

== Club career ==
=== Wolverhampton Wanderers ===
Following her time at Stoke City, Bedeau joined Wolverhampton Wanderers. During the 2022–23 season, the team finished as runners-up in the FA Women's National League North.

=== Newcastle United ===
In July 2023, Bedeau joined Newcastle United. She became the first Black female professional footballer to sign for the club. Newcastle won the FA Women's National League North title during her tenure and secured promotion to the Women's Super League 2.

=== Nottingham Forest ===
In July 2024, Bedeau signed for Nottingham Forest. Bedeau was part of the squad that won the FA Women's National League North title in the 2024-2025 season.

== International career ==
Bedeau made her senior international debut for Grenada on 29 November 2025, serving as team captain and scoring in a 2–1 loss to Costa Rica in the CONCACAF W qualifiers

== Playing style ==
Bedeau has been described as a physically strong and combative central defender.

== Personal life ==
Bedeau is also known for her advocacy work off the pitch, serving as a patron of Show Racism the Red Card. She leverages her public profile to raise awareness of racial discrimination and supports educational programmes that promote inclusion and challenge prejudice.

In 2025, Bedeau founded a non-profit organisation called Beat the Block, that empowers underrepresented young women and girls to self actualise through Education, Exposure and Sport.

In 2025, Bedeau acted as a professional advisor for Football Skills, a book published by Usborne in partnership with Show Racism the Red Card, aimed at helping young readers develop both their football abilities and understanding of social inequalities.

In 2023, Bedeau graduated from University of Nottingham with a Masters of Mathematics.
