= Megan Bell =

Northern Irish footballer

Personal information
- Full name: Megan Bell
- Date of birth: 17 April 2001 (age 25)
- Place of birth: Dundonald, Northern Ireland
- Positions: Midfielder; right wing

Team information
- Current team: Linfield

Youth career
- Ards Rangers: Dungoyne
- Linfield

Senior career*
Years	Team	Apps	(Gls)
2015–2019	Linfield		
2019–2020	Durham	10	(2)
2020–2025	Rangers	24	(6)
2024	→ Heart of Midlothian (loan)	7	(2)
2025–2025	Nottingham Forest	7	(0)
2025–	Linfield		

International career^{‡}
2016	Northern Ireland U17	6	(3)
2017	Northern Ireland U19	9	(1)
2017–	Northern Ireland	45	(4)
- * Club domestic league appearances and goals as of 1 July 2025 ‡ National team caps and goals as of 5 June 2026

Megan Bell (born 17 April 2001) is a Northern Irish footballer who plays as a midfielder for Linfield in the Women's Premiership and Northern Ireland.

== Early life ==
Bell was born in Dundonald, Northern Ireland. Growing up, she idolised Steven Gerard, but was a fan of Rangers F.C.

== Club career ==
=== Linfield ===
On 19 August 2015, 14-year-old Bell scored two goals for Linfield on her senior debut in a 6–1 home win over Sion Swifts. She won three consecutive Women's Premiership titles with Linfield between 2016 and 2018, having left Grosvenor Grammar School in 2017.

=== Durham ===
On 9 July 2019, Bell signed with English FA Women's Championship team Durham. The move coincided will Bell starting a degree in sport, physical activity and exercise at Durham University. On 18 August 2019, she made her debut for the team in the season opener against Leicester City, scoring in the 7th minute of a 5–1 win. After 14 appearances in all competitions in the first half of the season, Bell announced her departure from semi-professional Durham in January 2020 in order to concentrate solely on football.

=== Rangers ===
On 5 January 2020, Bell became a full-time footballer, signing with professional SWPL club Rangers. since then despite injuries she has made several appearances for Rangers and won the league title and sky sports cup with the club rangers currently just got into finals of the Scottish cup against Celtic

=== Heart of Midlothian ===
Megan joined Hearts on loan from Rangers until the end of the season on 25 January 2024.

== International career ==
On 28 November 2017, Bell made her senior debut for Northern Ireland aged 16 years 7 months, starting in a 3–1 2019 World Cup qualifying win away to Slovakia. On 2 March 2018, Bell scored her first international goal in a 1–1 draw against Romania at the 2018 Turkish Women's Cup friendly tournament.

== International goals ==
No.	Date	Venue	Opponent	Score	Result	Competition
1.	2 March 2018	Gold City, Antalya, Turkey	Romania	1–0	1–1	2018 Turkish Women's Cup
2.	1 December 2023	Arena Kombëtare, Tirana, Albania	Albania	4–0	4–0	2023–24 UEFA Women's Nations League
3.	9 April 2024	Bosnia and Herzegovina FA Training Centre, Zenica, Bosnia & Herzegovina	Bosnia and Herzegovina	2–1	3–1	UEFA Women's Euro 2025 qualifying
4.	5 June 2026	Pendik Stadium, Istanbul, Turkey	Turkey	1–1	1–2	2027 FIFA Women's World Cup qualification

== Honours ==
=== Club ===
Linfield

- Women's Premiership: 2016, 2017, 2018
- IFA Women's Challenge Cup: 2016

Rangers

- Scottish Women's Premier League: 2021-22,
- Sky sports cup winners : 2022-23
