= Jessica Hennessy =

Irish Footballer (born 2001)

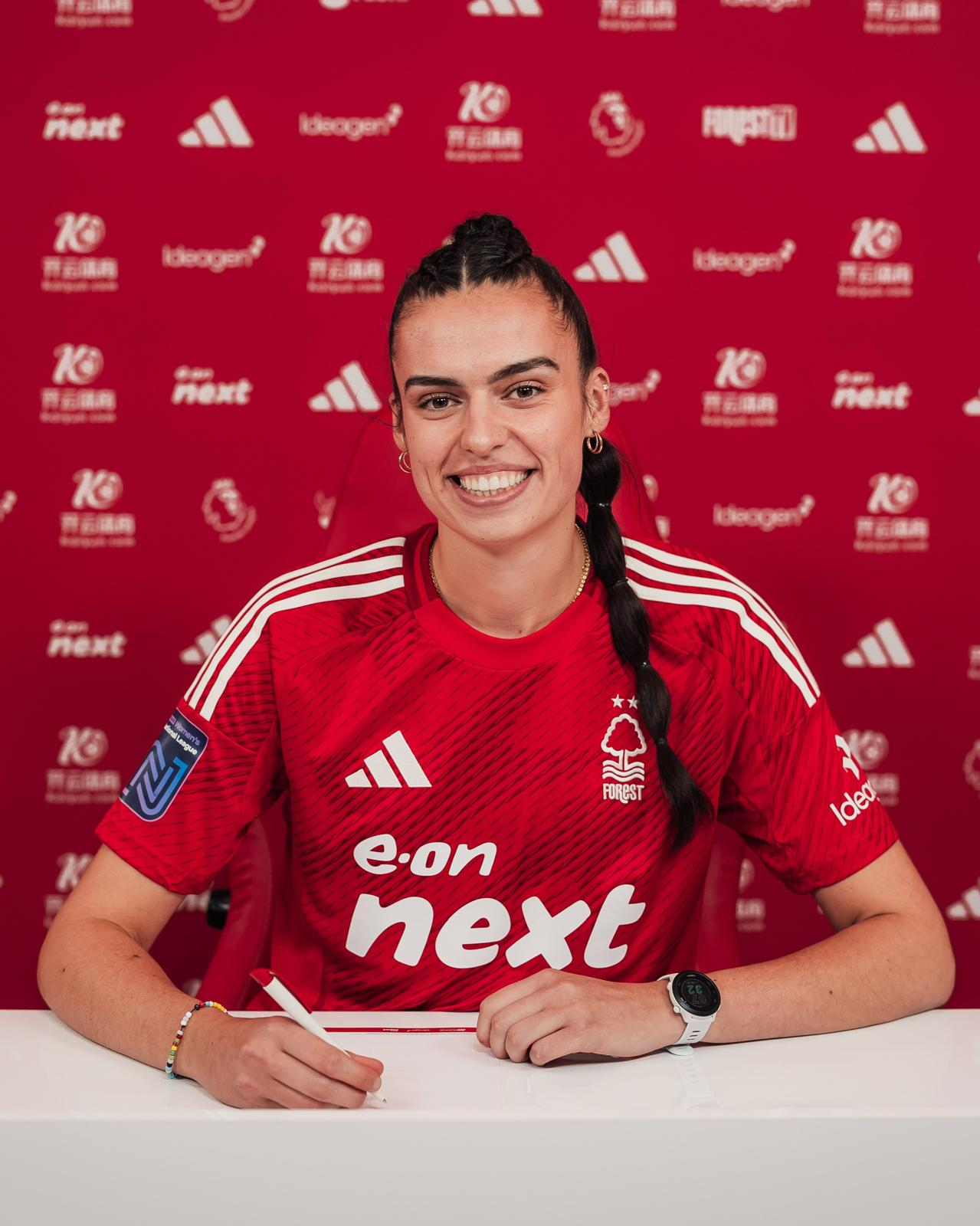

Personal information
- Full name: Jessica Hennessy
- Date of birth: 1 October 2001 (age 25)
- Place of birth: County Westmeath, Ireland
- Height: 1.85 m (6 ft 1 in)
- Position: Defender

Team information
- Current team: Burnley

Youth career
- 2015–2017: Lucan United
- 2017–2019: Shelbourne

College career
Years	Team	Apps	(Gls)
2021–2023	AIT		

Senior career*
Years	Team	Apps	(Gls)
2020–2022	Athlone Town	38	
2023–2024	Shamrock Rovers	46	(3)
2024–2025	Nottingham Forest	2	(0)
2025–2026	Bournemouth	33	(6)
2026–	Burnley	0	(0)
- * Club domestic league appearances and goals as of 00:42, 28th March 2023 (UTC)

Jessica Hennessy (born 1 October 2001) is an Irish professional footballer who plays as a central defender for Burnley.

== Club career ==
Hennessy is from County Westmeath and began her soccer career with Mullingar Athletic. In 2015 Hennessy moved to Lucan United for 2 seasons. In 2017 Hennessy transferred to Shelbourne FC for 2 seasons. While with Shelbourne Hennessy helped them secure the U17 All Ireland National League title where she lined out as an attacking midfielder.

=== Athlone Town ===
Following her underage career Hennessy then signed for Women's National League club Athlone Town ahead of the 2020 season.

In 2022 Hennessy helped Athlone Town get to their first FAI Women's Cup Final where they lost 2–0 to her former side Shelbourne FC. Hennessy's impressive 2022 season with Athlone Town earned her a spot on the Women's National League team of the year as well as a recent call-up to Ireland's home-based training camp.

=== Shamrock Rovers ===
Following her standout season with Athlone Town that seen them finish runners up in the League and Cup, Hennessy signed for newly reformed Shamrock Rovers for the 2023 season. Hennessy impressed during her time at Shamrock Rovers winning the Players’ Player of the Year as well as being named in both The League of Ireland Women's Premier Division Team of the Season and the first-ever PFAI Team of the Year.

Hennessy resigned for the 2024 season and made 21 appearances for Shamrock Rovers across all competitions.

=== Nottingham Forest ===
On 13 September 2024, Hennessy signed for Nottingham Forest on a one-year deal. While at Nottingham Forest, Hennessy was part of the Nottingham Forest Team that got promoted to the Women's Super League 2.

=== AFC Bournemouth ===
Having completed her 1-year deal with Nottingham Forest, Hennessy signed with AFC Bournemouth for the 25/26 Season. During her time at AFC Bournemouth, Hennessy started all 22 league games and was part of the side that won the FA Women's National League Cup securing 'Player of the Match' on the day. Hennessy finished her year with AFC Bournemouth being voted players’ player of the season by her teammates.

=== Burnley ===
On 23 July 2026, Hennessy was announced at Burnley.

== Honours ==
AFC Bournemouth

- FA Women's National League Cup: 2025–26
