= Millie Chandarana =

English footballer (born 1997)

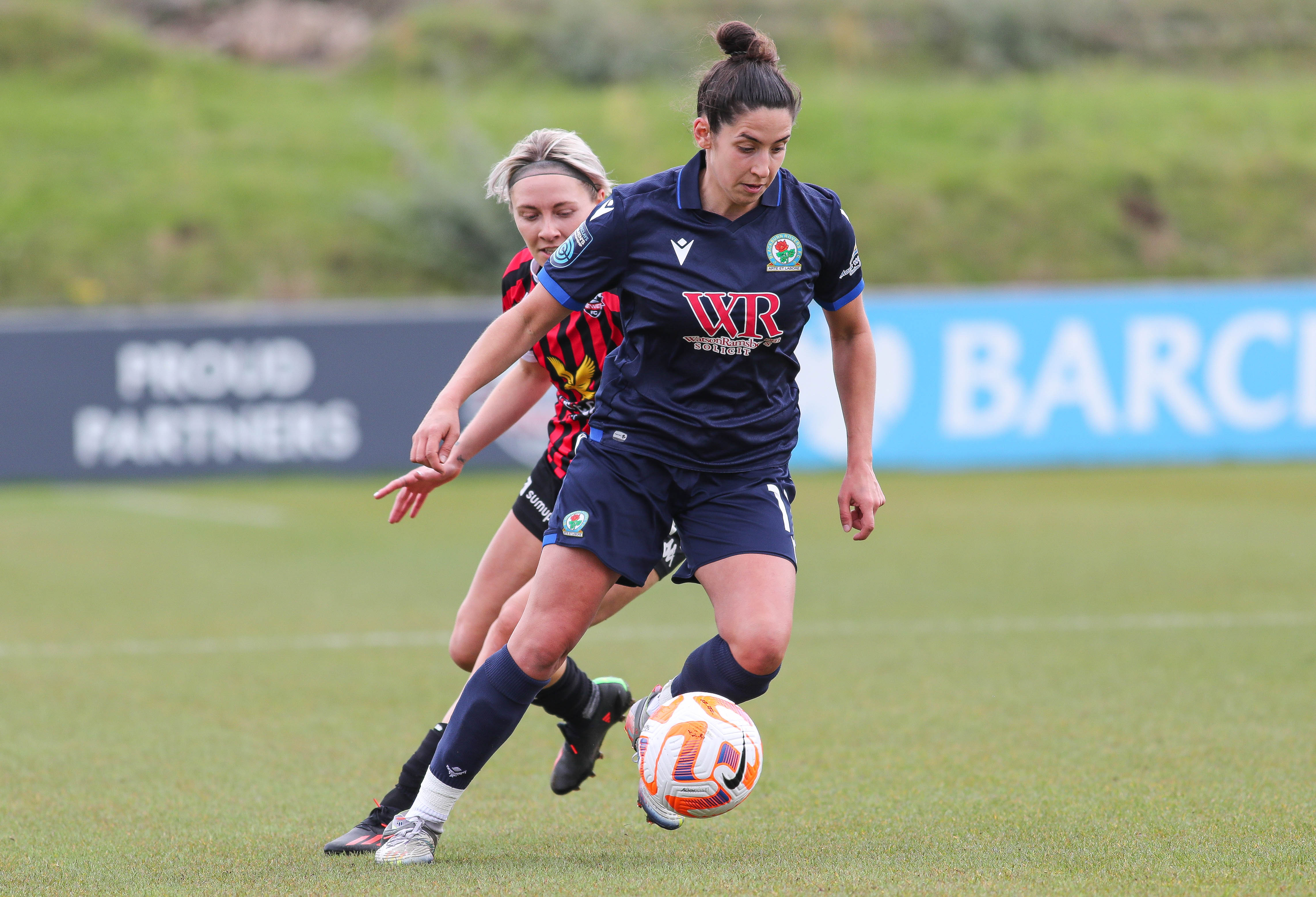
- Chandarana with Blackburn Rovers in 2023

Personal information
- Date of birth: 11 March 1997 (age 29)
- Place of birth: Rotherham, South Yorkshire, England
- Position: Midfielder

Team information
- Current team: Burnley

Senior career*
Years	Team	Apps	(Gls)
2014–2016	Blackburn Rovers		
2016–2019	Loughborough Foxes		
2019–2020	Tavagnacco	16	(1)
2020–2021	San Marino	22	(0)
2021–2024	Blackburn Rovers	57	(2)
2024–2025	Nottingham Forest	20	(4)
2025–	Burnley		
- * Club domestic league appearances and goals

Millie Chandarana (born 11 March 1997) is an English footballer who plays as a midfielder for Burnley. Besides England, she has played in San Marino, the United Arab Emirates, and Italy.

== Early life ==
Chandarana was born in Rotherham to a Gujarati Indian father and an English mother. She took part in a trial to join her school's all-boys football team at eight years old and was initially told to join a local girls' team instead after scoring in the wrong goal, but started playing for the school team a few months later. She later attended the Manchester United Girls Academy, playing for the club up to under-15 level despite being a Manchester City fan.

== Club career ==
Chandarana played for youth teams at Blackburn Rovers before making her debut for the senior team in 2014 at age 17. She made a total of 18 appearances for the club before moving on in 2016. While at university in Loughborough she played for both the university team and Loughborough Foxes. She had a spell at Leoni FC in Dubai in 2018 during her university placement year before returning to Loughborough and leading the university's first team to the finals of the National Championship.

Upon graduation, Chandarana had planned to continue her studies in the USA, but instead contacted several football clubs based on a "gut instinct" about her career path, and received an offer from Italian side UPC Tavagnacco. She played for the club as they battled to avoid relegation from Italy's first division Serie A in the 2019-20 season. In 2020 Chandarana transferred to San Marino Academy, also in Serie A.

In 2021, Chandarana returned to Blackburn Rovers, becoming the first British South Asian woman to sign a professional contract with the club, and the only British South Asian woman with a professional deal in the Women's Championship. She won Blackburn Rovers Goal of the Season for two consecutive seasons and helped the club achieve their highest ever league finish in the 2023-24 season. She also featured in the 2023-24 British South Asians in Football Team of the Season, playing in a celebratory showcase fixture to mark South Asian Heritage Month after the conclusion of the season.

Following criticism of Blackburn Rovers for cutting funding to their women's team, Chandarana transferred to Nottingham Forest in the third division National League, signing a one year contract with the club in 2024. In her one season at Forest, Chandarana contributed to the team achieving a league and cup double, and earning promotion to the Championship.

In July 2025, Chandarana signed with Burnley.

== Personal life ==
Chandarana graduated from Loughborough University with a degree in Sport and Exercise Science. While studying, she was required to undertake a placement year, during which she worked as a P.E. teacher in Spain and as a wellness coach in Dubai. In 2023, she began studying for an MSc in Football Business with the Global Institute of Sport, supported by the South Asians in Football Leadership Scholarship, of which she was the first recipient.
