= Burnley F.C. Women =

Burnley FC Women
- Full name: Burnley Football Club Women
- Nickname: The Clarets
- Founded: 1995
- Ground: County Ground, Leyland; Turf Moor
- Capacity: 2,300; 21,944
- Coordinates: 53°47′20″N 2°13′49″W; Turf Moor
- Manager: Jackie Bachteler
- League: Women's Super League 2
- 2025–26: FA Women's National League North, 1st of 12 (promoted)
- Website: https://www.burnleyfootballclub.com/
Home colours	Away colours	Third colours

Burnley FC Women is an English women's football club from Burnley, Lancashire, affiliated with Burnley Football Club. From its inception in 1995 until 2018, it was known as Burnley FC Girls and Ladies. The team compete in the Women's Super League 2, the second tier of women's football in England, following promotion from the FA Women's National League in 2025–26.

== History ==
The club was founded in 1995 by John Lister, just too late for hometown girl and future England international goalkeeper Rachel Brown-Finnis to join as a child. The club initially consisted of 15 ladies, who trained in the old sports barn at Turf Moor and played their home games at the club's training facility at Gawthorpe. Following the demise of the Lancashire League, the team joined the North West Women's Regional League.

The club established a junior set-up from the outset. An Under 10s side was formed by Grahame Meeks and Peter Cooper shortly after the first-team was founded. The youth set-up was grassroots for many years, to encourage players of all ages and abilities to take-up football, including England youth international Naomi Hartley.

At the end of the 2016–17 season, the management and operation of the club was transferred to Burnley FC in the Community. The following season, in the 2017–18 FA Women's Cup, the team won three preliminary round games to qualify for the first round proper for the first time in their history. Burnley reached the third round, where they were eliminated by third-tier side Cardiff City. Burnley won promotion to the FA Women's National League Division One North at the end of the same season. In 2018, the club was renamed Burnley FC Women, and for the first time players of all ages were required to negotiate trials to represent the club. In the 2018–19 season, the team won the league title and were promoted to the FA Women's National League North, the third tier in English women's football.

In February 2021, it was announced that the women's team would be integrated into Burnley F.C., as the club's new American owner Alan Pace sought to turn the women's team professional. Several months later, Burnley became the first British side to stream their home games on the video-sharing app TikTok, with the club hitting one million views on TikTok live in April 2023. Burnley Women played their first game at Turf Moor on 30 April 2023, winning 2–1 against Liverpool Feds in front of almost 3,000 supporters. It was the last game of the 2022–23 league season, with Burnley finishing third in the FA Women's National League North. They improved the following season, finishing as runners-up to Newcastle United.

Burnley Women turned full-time professional from the 2025–26 season. The club appointed Matt Beard as manager in June 2025. In August, after just four games in charge, Burnley confirmed that Beard had chosen to resign from his position to follow other opportunities, placing him on gardening leave for three months, and that the club's search for a new manager was already underway. First-team coach Louise Roberts was named as interim manager. Ross Wallace was appointed as Roberts's successor in February 2026, and under his guidance, Burnley ended the 2025–26 season in first place and won promotion to the second tier—the Women's Super League 2—for the first time in the club's history. They remained undefeated throughout the campaign and conceded only 5 goals in 22 matches.

== Players ==
=== First-team squad ===
As of 16 September 2026

Note: Flags indicate national team as defined under FIFA eligibility rules; some limited exceptions apply. Players may hold more than one non-FIFA nationality.

No.	Pos.	Nation	Player
2	DF	ENG	Charley Docherty
3	DF	ENG	Emma Siddall
4	MF	NIR	Brenna McPartlan
5	DF	ENG	Deanna Cooper
6	MF	IRL	Tyler Toland
7	FW	ENG	Heidi Logan
8	MF	IRL	Jamie Finn
9	FW	ENG	Claudia Mummery-Walker
10	MF	ENG	Christie Harrison-Murray (captain)
11	DF	IRL	Kiera Sena
13	DF	ENG	Jade Richards
14	DF	IRL	Jessica Hennessy

No.	Pos.	Nation	Player
17	MF	ENG	Millie Chandarana
18	FW	ENG	Rachel Williams
19	MF	ENG	Charlie Chadwick
20	DF	ENG	Maddi Wilde
21	FW	ENG	Charlie Wellings
22	DF	ENG	Alethea Paul
23	DF	ENG	Naomi Hartley
24	MF	ENG	Brooke Cairns
25	GK	NIR	Jackie Burns
28	GK	SCO	Kirstie Levell
44	FW	ENG	Leah Galton

=== Out on loan ===
Note: Flags indicate national team as defined under FIFA eligibility rules; some limited exceptions apply. Players may hold more than one non-FIFA nationality.

No.	Pos.	Nation	Player
1	GK	ENG	Eva Spencer (at Hull City until 30 June 2027)
27	GK	IRL	Naoisha McAloon (at Liverpool Feds until 30 June 2027)

== Honours ==
=== League ===
FA Women's National League

- Northern Premier Division (tier 3)
  - Winners: 2025–26
  - Runners-up: 2023–24
- Division One North (tier 4)
  - Winners: 2018–19

North West Women's Regional Football League

- Premier Division (tier 5)
  - Winners: 2017–18
- Division Two (tier 6)
  - Winners: 2004–05
- Division Three (tier 7)
  - Winners: 2003–04

=== Cup ===
Lancashire FA Women’s Senior Cup

- Winners: 2022–23, 2023–24, 2024–25

Lancashire FA Women's Challenge Cup

- Winners: 2021–22
