= List of Nottingham Forest Women F.C. seasons =

This is a list of all seasons played by Nottingham Forest Women Football Club, from their creation in 1999 to their last completed season in 2024. It details the club's performance in every competition entered.

== Overall ==
- Seasons spent at Level 1 of the football league system: 2
- Seasons spent at Level 2 of the football league system: 6
- Seasons spent at Level 3 of the football league system: 15
- Seasons spent at Level 4 of the football league system: 0

== Seasons ==
Season	League										FA Cup	League Cup		Ref.
Season	Division	Tier	Pld	W	D	L	GF	GA	Pts	Pos	FA Cup	Cup	Round	Ref.
1993–1994											R1			
1994–1995														
1995–1996														
1996–1997														
1997–1998														
1998–1999														
1999–2000	East Midlands League	4									R2	East Midlands League Cup	W	
2000–2001	East Midlands League	4										East Midlands League Cup		
2001–2002	East Midlands League	4										East Midlands League Cup	W	
2002–2003	East Midlands League	4								1st ↑		East Midlands League Cup		
2003–2004	Midland Combination League	3	18	13	3	2	43	15	42	2nd	QF			
2004–2005	Midland Combination League	3	22	20	0	2	81	13	68	1st ↑	R3			
2005–2006	WPL Northern Division	2	22	8	6	8	33	30	30	5th	R4	WPL Cup	R1	
2006–2007	WPL Northern Division	2	22	11	3	8	41	36	36	3rd	R5	WPL Cup	R2	
2007–2008	WPL Northern Division	2	22	18	4	0	80	26	58	1st ↑	R3	WPL Cup	PR	
2008–2009	WPL National Division	1	22	5	2	15	25	59	17	10th	R5	WPL Cup	R2	
2009–2010	WPL National Division	1	22	3	4	15	16	51	13	11th ↓	QF	WPL Cup	R1	
2010–2011	WPL National Division	2	14	6	5	3	19	16	23	2nd	R4	WPL Cup	RU	
2011–2012	WPL National Division	2	18	4	3	11	21	42	15	10th ↓	R3	WPL Cup	R1	
2012–2013	WPL Northern Division	3	16	10	2	4	35	22	32	2nd	R5	WPL Cup	GS	
2013–2014	WPL Northern Division	3	20	10	3	7	44	24	33	4th	R3	WPL Cup	QF	
2014–2015	WPL Northern Division	3	22	7	2	13	34	52	23	9th	R2	WPL Cup	QF	
2015–2016	WPL Northern Division	3	22	11	4	7	37	27	37	6th	R4	WPL Cup	SF	
2016–2017	WPL Northern Division	3	20	5	3	12	27	49	18	10th	R4	WPL Cup	R1	
2017–2018	WPL Northern Division	3	22	5	4	13	23	57	19	9th	R2	WPL Cup	QF	
2018–2019	WNL Northern Premier Division	3	24	7	4	13	29	57	25	9th	R3	WNL Cup	R3	
2019–2020	WNL Northern Premier Division (Note: The 2019–20 season was abandoned due to the COVID-19 pandemic)	3	13	9	1	3	27	19	28	3rd	R3	WNL Plate	QF	
2020–2021	WNL Northern Premier Division (Note: The 2020–21 season was abandoned due to the COVID-19 pandemic)	3	9	4	2	3	22	10	14	6th	R2			
2021–2022	WNL Northern Premier Division	3	24	13	5	6	40	17	44	5th	R4	WNL Plate	W	
2022–2023	WNL Northern Premier Division	3	22	17	3	2	81	18	54	1st	R3	WNL Cup	W	
2023–2024	WNL Northern Premier Division	3	22	15	2	5	59	21	47	3rd	R5	WNL Cup	R2	
2024–2025	WNL Northern Premier Division	3	22	18	4	0	79	8	58	1st ↑	R4	WNL Cup	W	
2025–2026	WSL 2	2	22	9	3	10	27	35	30	7th	R4	League Cup	GS	
2026–2027	WSL 2	2												

== Key ==
- Pld – Matches played
- W – Matches won
- D – Matches drawn
- L – Matches lost
- GF – Goals for
- GA – Goals against
- Pts – Points
- Pos – Final position
- ↑ – Promoted
- ↓ – Relegated
- WPL – Women's Premier League
- WNL – Women's National League
- WSL 2 – Women's Super League 2
- n/a – Not applicable
- PR – Preliminary round
- GS – Group Stage
- R1 – Round 1
- R2 – Round 2
- R3 – Round 3
- R4 – Round 4
- R5 – Round 5
- QF – Quarter-finals
- SF – Semi-finals
- RU – Runners-up
- W – Winners

Champions	Runners-up	Third-place	Relegated
