= 2021–22 Nottingham Forest W.F.C. season =

Nottingham Forest
2021–22 season
- Chairperson: David Shelton
- Head Coach: Andrew Cook
- Stadium: Halbrooke Stadium, Eastwood; City Ground, West Bridgford
- FA WNL Northern Premier Division: 5th
- Women's FA Cup: 4th Round
- FA WNL Plate: Winners
- Biggest win: 7 – 0 v Middlesbrough (Away); 10 April 2022 (FA WNL Northern Premier Division)
- Biggest defeat: 0 – 8 v Manchester City (Home); 29 January 2022 (Women's FA Cup)
Home colours	Away colours

The 2021–22 season season was Nottingham Forest Women's fourth consecutive season in the FA Women's National League Northern Premier Division, which stands at level three of the women's football league pyramid.

Forest finished 5th in the league this season and won the FA Women's National League Plate beating Wimbledon 2-1 in the final played at Solihull.

== Squad Information ==
=== First team squad ===
No.	Name	Nat.	Date of birth	Since	Signed from
Goalkeepers
1	Emily Batty	(England)	2 November 1998 (age 28)	18 July 2021	(England) Sheffield United
18	Aja Aguirre	(Canada)	18 November 1991 (age 34)	1 July 2019	(England) Aston Villa
Defenders
2	Lyndsey Harkin	(England)	30 August 1991 (age 35)	1 February 2016	(England) Doncaster Rovers Belles
3	Georgia Hewitt	(England)	12 June 1994 (age 32)	1 August 2018	(England) Derby County
5	Olivia Cook	(England)	10 January 2001 (age 25)	1 July 2019	(England) Doncaster Rovers Belles
13	Grace Walters	(England)	16 March 1997 (age 29)	-	Academy
15	Laura-Jayne O'Neill	(England)	1 December 1994 (age 31)	1 July 2017	(England) Notts County
17	Charley Docherty	(England)	27 May 2003 (age 23)	27 January 2022	(England) Sheffield United
21	Hayley James	(England)	17 July 1995 (age 31)	1 August 2020	(England) Leicester City
23	Sophia Bonser	(England)	5 November 1999 (age 27)	-	Academy
	Arryana Daniels	(United States)	1 September 2001 (age 25)	1 September 2021	(United States) Temple Owls
Midfielders
4	Rachel Brown	(Scotland)	24 October 2000 (age 26)	1 July 2020	(England) Leicester City
6	Charlotte Steggles	(England)	18 March 1996 (age 30)	1 August 2020	(England) Leicester City
11	Amy West	(England)	10 April 1997 (age 29)	8 July 2021	(England) Aston Villa
12	Niamh Reynolds	(Republic of Ireland)	31 October 2001 (age 25)	1 August 2020	(England) Reading
14	Sophie Bramford	(England)	28 September 2002 (age 24)	27 July 2021	(England) Aston Villa
16	Sophie Tudor	(Wales)	17 October 1999 (age 27)	1 July 2019	(England) Tottenham Hotspur
17	Freya Thomas	(England)	28 October 2001 (age 25)	22 July 2021	(England) Leicester City
19	Becky Anderson	(England)	-	2 July 2021	(England) Coventry United
20	Poppy Scholefield			-	Academy
26	Tamara Wilcock	(England)	10 October 2003 (age 23)	27 January 2022	(England) Sheffield United
27	Alice Higginbottom	(England)	12 July 2004 (age 22)	-	Academy
28	Naomi Powell	(United States)	10 January 1999 (age 27)	28 July 2021	(United States) NC State Wolfpack
Forwards
7	Katie Middleton	(England)	2 January 2002 (age 24)	-	Academy
8	Mai Moncaster	(England)	14 August 2001 (age 25)	1 September 2019	(England) Leicester City
9	Jade Arber	(Scotland)	3 July 1993 (age 33)	1 July 2021	(England) West Bromwich Albion
10	Rosie Axten	(England)	24 September 1997 (age 29)	1 July 2021	(England) Coventry United
16	Gianna Mitchell	(United States)	-	1 February 2022	(United States) Florida State Seminoles
22	Charlotte Greengrass	(England)	-	1 September 2020	(England) Aston Villa
24	Lagan Makin	(England)	10 May 1991 (age 35)	14 October 2021	(England) Blackburn Rovers

== Squad Changes ==
=== Transfers In ===
Date	Pos.	Player	From	Fee	Ref.
2 July 2021	FW	Jade Arber	West Bromwich Albion	Free agent	
2 July 2021	MF	Becky Anderson	Coventry United	Free agent	
8 July 2021	MF	Amy West	Aston Villa	Free agent	
18 July 2021	GK	Emily Batty	Sheffield United	Free agent	
22 July 2021	MF	Sophie Bramford	Aston Villa	Free agent	
22 July 2021	MF	Freya Thomas	Leicester City	Free agent	
28 July 2021	MF	Naomi Powell	NC State Wolfpack	Free agent	
1 September 2021	DF	Arryana Daniels	Temple Owls	Free agent	
14 October 2021	MF	Lagan Makin	Blackburn Rovers	Free agent	
1 February 2022	FW	Gianna Mitchell	Florida State Seminoles	Free agent	

=== Transfers Out ===
Date	Pos.	Player	To	Fee	Ref.
2021	MF	Freya Thomas	Coventry United	Free agent	
5 January 2022	MF	Sophie Tudor	West Bromwich Albion	Free agent	
28 March 2022	FW	Jade Arber	West Bromwich Albion	Free agent	

=== Loans In ===
Date from	Pos.	Player	From	Duration	Ref.
27 January 2022	FW	Tamara Wilcock	Sheffield United	Six month loan	
27 January 2022	MF	Charley Docherty	Sheffield United	Six month loan	

=== Loans Out ===
Date from	Pos.	Player	To	Duration	Ref.

=== Released ===
Date	Pos.	Player	Subsequent club	Date signed	Ref.

=== New contracts ===
Date	Pos.	Player	Contract length	Ref.

== Competitions ==
=== Overall record ===
Competition	First match	Last match	Starting round	Final position	Record							
Competition	First match	Last match	Starting round	Final position	Pld	W	D	L	GF	GA	GD	Win %
WNL Northern Premier Division	15 August 2021	10 April 2022	Matchday 1	Fifth	24	13	5	6	40	17	+23	54.17
Women's FA Cup	14 November 2021	29 January 2022	First round	Fourth round	4	3	0	1	10	9	+1	75.00
WNL Plate	12 September 2021	24 April 2022	Determining round	Winners	6	5	0	1	12	3	+9	83.33
Total					34	21	5	8	62	29	+33	61.76

Source: Soccerway

=== FA Women's National League Northern Premier Division ===
==== Results summary ====
Overall								Home						Away					
Pld	W	D	L	GF	GA	GD	Pts	W	D	L	GF	GA	GD	W	D	L	GF	GA	GD
24	13	5	6	40	17	+23	44	7	3	2	16	9	+7	6	2	4	24	8	+16

Source: Soccerway

==== Results by round ====
Round	1	2	3	4	5	6	7	8	9	10	11	12	13	14	15	16	17	18	19	20	21	22	23	24
Ground	H	A	H	A	A	H	H	A	H	H	H	A	A	A	A	H	H	H	H	A	A	A	A	H
Result	D	W	W	W	L	W	L	D	W	W	D	L	W	W	L	W	L	W	W	L	W	W	D	D
Position	8	4	3	1	3	2	4	4	5	5	4	6	5	4	5	4	4	4	4	4	4	4	4	5
Points	1	4	7	10	10	13	13	14	17	20	21	21	24	27	27	30	30	33	36	36	39	42	43	44

Source: Soccerway
A = Away; H = Home; W = Win; D = Draw; L = Loss

==== Matches ====
Win Draw Loss Fixtures

15 August 2021 1	Nottingham Forest	0 - 0	Huddersfield Town	Eastwood
14:00 BST		Report	Bethany Ibbotson (yellow card)	Stadium: Halbrooke Stadium; Attendance: 181

22 August 2021 2	Burnley	1 - 4	Nottingham Forest	Accrington
14:00 BST	Dominique Cooper	Report	Freya Thomas 20'; Jade Arber 39' (yellow card); Mai Moncaster 89'; Rosie Axten 90'	Stadium: Crown Ground; Attendance: 100

26 August 2021 3	Nottingham Forest	3 - 1	Sheffield	Eastwood
19:45 BST	Rosie Axten 23'; Georgia Hewitt 34'; Mai Moncaster 89'	Report	Yasmin Mason	Stadium: Halbrooke Stadium; Attendance: 261

29 August 2021 4	Hull City	0 - 6	Nottingham Forest	Kingston upon Hull
14:00 BST		Report	Freya Thomas 48'; Jade Arber 54', 82'; Charlotte Greengrass 58'; Rachel Brown 69'; Rosie Axten 75'	Stadium: Haworth Park; Attendance: 114

05 September 2021 5	Wolverhampton Wanderers	1 - 0	Nottingham Forest	Castlecroft
14:00 BST	Anna Morphet 60'; Kelly Darby (yellow card)	Report		Stadium: Prestige Midlands Arena; Attendance: 392

26 September 2021 6	Nottingham Forest	1 - 0	Fylde	Eastwood
14:00 BST	Jade Arber 22' (yellow card)	Report		Stadium: Halbrooke Stadium; Attendance: 164

03 October 2021 7	Nottingham Forest	0 - 2	Derby County	West Bridgford
14:00 BST	Charlotte Greengrass (yellow card)	Report	Emily Joyce 42'; Ellie Gilliatt 45+1'; Precious Hamilton (yellow card); Amy Sims (yellow card)	Stadium: City Ground; Attendance: 4443

05 October 2021 8	West Bromwich Albion	0 - 0	Nottingham Forest	Sutton Coldfield
19:45 BST		Report		Stadium: Central Ground; Attendance: 115

24 October 2021 9	Nottingham Forest	3 - 2	Middlesbrough	Eastwood
14:00 BST	Rachel Brown 22', 42', 70'; Hayley James (yellow card)	Report	Elysia Boddy; Felicity Jones; Emily Cassidy (yellow card)	Stadium: Halbrooke Stadium; Attendance: 142

18 November 2021 10	Nottingham Forest	4 - 0	Loughborough Lightning	Eastwood
20:00 GMT	Becky Anderson 4'; Rosie Axten 25'; Sophie Tudor 70'; 90+3' (o.g.)	Report		Stadium: Halbrooke Stadium

19 December 2021 11	Nottingham Forest	1 - 1	Burnley	Eastwood
14:00 GMT	Rachel Brown 14'	Report	Courtney Willis	Stadium: Halbrooke Stadium; Attendance: 76

16 January 2022 12	Huddersfield Town	2 - 1	Nottingham Forest	Kirkburton
14:00 GMT	Laura Elford 10' (yellow card); Serena Fletcher 44'; Georgia Marshall (yellow card); Brittany Sanderson (yellow card)	Report	Becky Anderson 90+3'	Stadium: Stafflex Arena; Attendance: 137

23 January 2022 13	Stoke City	0 - 1	Nottingham Forest	Stoke-on-Trent
14:00 GMT	Meg Bowyer (yellow card)	Report	Rachel Brown 53'; Georgia Hewitt (yellow card)	Stadium: Norton Cricket Club & Miners Welfare Institute

27 January 2022 14	Sheffield	0 - 2	Nottingham Forest	Dronfield
19:45 GMT		Report	Grace Walters 34'; Sophia Bonser 85'	Stadium: Home of Football Ground

13 February 2022 15	Fylde	2 - 1	Nottingham Forest	Warton
14:00 GMT	Faye McCoy 66'; Amy Hughes 90+3'	Report	Rachel Brown 46'; Tamara Wilcock (yellow card)	Stadium: Kellamergh Park; Attendance: 100

20 February 2022 16	Nottingham Forest	1 - 0	Hull City	Eastwood
14:00 GMT	Charlotte Greengrass 68'; Rachel Brown (yellow card); Lyndsey Harkin (yellow card)	Report		Stadium: Halbrooke Stadium; Attendance: 92

27 February 2022 17	Nottingham Forest	0 - 3	Wolverhampton Wanderers	Eastwood
14:00 GMT		Report	Laura Cooper 20'; Helen Dermody 27'; Anna Morphet 55'	Stadium: Halbrooke Stadium; Attendance: 145

03 March 2022 18	Nottingham Forest	1 - 0	West Bromwich Albion	Eastwood
20:00 GMT	Gianna Mitchell 70'; Georgia Hewitt (yellow card); Hayley James (yellow card)	Report		Stadium: Halbrooke Stadium; Attendance: 84

13 March 2022 19	Nottingham Forest	2 - 0	Stoke City	Eastwood
14:00 GMT	Rosie Axten 9'; Gianna Mitchell 22'	Report	Callan Barber (yellow card)	Stadium: Halbrooke Stadium; Attendance: 182

27 March 2022 20	Derby County	1 - 0	Nottingham Forest	Derby
14:00 BST	Sherry McCue 17'; Nikki Miles (yellow card); Megan Tinsley (red card)	Report	Gianna Mitchell (yellow card)	Stadium: Pride Park; Attendance: 3552

03 April 2022 21	Brighouse Town	0 - 1	Nottingham Forest	Lightcliffe
14:00 BST	Annabelle Cass (yellow card)	Report	Rachel Brown 90+2'; Gianna Mitchell (yellow card)	Stadium: Heffernan Utilities Stadium; Attendance: 75

10 April 2022 22	Middlesbrough	0 - 7	Nottingham Forest	Billingham
14:00 BST		Report	Mai Moncaster 22', 51'; Charlotte Greengrass 37', 75', 79'; Naomi Powell 83'; Amy West 90+5'; Hayley James (yellow card)	Stadium: Bedford Terrace; Attendance: 173

13 April 2022 23	Loughborough Lightning	1 - 1	Nottingham Forest	Loughborough
19:45 BST		Report	Amy West 84'	Stadium: Holywell Park; Attendance: 184

01 May2022 24	Nottingham Forest	0 - 0	Brighouse Town	Eastwood
14:00 BST		Report		Stadium: Halbrooke Stadium; Attendance: 179

=== Women's FA Cup ===
==== Matches ====
Win Draw Loss Fixtures

14 November 2021 1	Nottingham Forest	4 - 0	Lichfield City	Eastwood
14:00 GMT	Naomi Powell 39'; Rosie Axten 46'; Mai Moncaster 51'; Becky Anderson 70'	Report		Stadium: Coronation Park

5 December 2021 2	Wolverhampton Wanderers	0 - 4	Nottingham Forest	Castlecroft
13:00 GMT		Report	Mai Moncaster 19'; Naomi Powell 51'; Niamh Reynolds 66'; Katie Middleton 90'; Rosie Axten (yellow card)	Stadium: Prestige Midlands Arena; Attendance: 260

12 December 2021 3	Stoke City	1 - 2	Nottingham Forest	Stoke-On-Trent
13:00 GMT	Callan Barbe 26'; Meg Bowyer (yellow card); Roisin Kivel (yellow card)	Report	Rachel Louise Brown 56'; Becky Anderson 77'	Stadium: Norton Cricket Club & Miners Welfare Institute

29 January 2022 4	Nottingham Forest	0 - 8	Manchester City	West Bridgford
13:00 GMT	Rachel Louise Brown (yellow card)	Report	Weir 2'; Shaw 34', 69'; Angeldal 43'; Stanway 50', 71', 90+2'; Hemp 53'	Stadium: City Ground; Attendance: 3,994

=== FA Women's National League Cup ===
Win Draw Loss

12 September 2021 Determining	Liverpool Feds	1 - 0	Nottingham Forest	Liverpool
14:00 BST	Ellie Fletcher 32'	Report	Charlotte Greengrass (yellow card)	Stadium: Jericho Lane

=== FA Women's National League Plate ===
Win Draw Loss

7 November 2021 1	Doncaster Rovers Belles	0 - 1	Nottingham Forest	New Rossington
14:00 GMT		Report	Mai Moncaster 37'	Stadium: Oxford Street

9 January 2022 2	Bedworth United	1 - 5	Nottingham Forest	Bedworth
14:00 GMT	Milly Miller	Report	Niamh Reynolds 2'; Rachel Louise Brown 3'; Hayley James 4'; Amy West 12'; Sophia Bonser 24'	Stadium: The Oval

6 February 2022 QF	Alnwick Town	0 - 1	Nottingham Forest	Alnwick
14:00 GMT		Report	Charlotte Steggles 67'	Stadium: St James Park; Attendance: 102

6 March 2022 SF	Cheltenham Town	0 - 3	Nottingham Forest	Cirencester
14:00 GMT		Report	Gianna Mitchell 26'; Charlotte Greengrass 36', 58'	Stadium: Corinium Stadium

21 April 2022 F	AFC Wimbledon	1 - 2	Nottingham Forest	Solihull
11:00 BST	Kelly Highman 25'; Megan Stow (yellow card)	Report	Rachel Louise Brown 13'; Becky Anderson 33' (yellow card)	Stadium: Armco Arena

== Statistics ==
=== Goalscorers ===
Rank	No.	Pos.	Player	League	FA Cup	League Cup	Total
1	4	MF	Rachel Brown	7	1	2	10
2	22	FW	Charlotte Greengrass	5	0	2	7
2	8	FW	Mai Moncaster	4	2	1	7
4	10	FW	Rosie Axten	5	1	0	6
4	19	MF	Becky Anderson	3	2	1	6
6	9	FW	Jade Arber	4	0	0	4
7	16	FW	Gianna Mitchell	2	0	1	3
7	11	MF	Amy West	2	0	1	3
7	28	MF	Naomi Powell	1	2	0	3
10	17	MF	Freya Thomas	2	0	0	2
10	23	DF	Sophia Bonser	1	0	1	2
10	12	MF	Niamh Reynolds	0	1	1	2
13	3	DF	Georgia Hewitt	1	0	0	1
13	16	DF	Sophie Tudor	1	0	0	1
13	13	DF	Grace Walters	1	0	0	1
13	7	FW	Katie Middleton	0	1	0	1
13	21	DF	Hayley James	0	0	1	1
13	6	MF	Charlotte Steggles	0	0	1	1
Own Goals				1	0	0	1
Totals				40	10	12	62

=== Clean sheets ===
Rank	No.	Pos.	Player	League	FA Cup	League Cup	Total
1	1	GK	Emily Batty	11	2	3	16
2	18	GK	Aja Aguirre	1	0	0	1
Totals				12	2	3	17

=== Hat-tricks ===
Player	Against	Result	Date	Competition	Ref.
Rachel Brown	Middlesbrough (H)	3 - 2	24 October 2021	WNL Northern Premier Division	
Charlotte Greengrass	Middlesbrough (A)	7 - 0	10 April 2022	WNL Northern Premier Division	
