= 2022–23 Nottingham Forest W.F.C. season =

Nottingham Forest
2022–23 season
- Chairperson: David Shelton
- Head Coach: Andrew Cook
- Stadium: Halbrooke Stadium, Eastwood; City Ground, West Bridgford
- FA WNL Northern Premier Division: 1st
- Women's FA Cup: 3rd Round
- FA WNL Cup: Winners
- Top goalscorer: League: Charlotte Greengrass (17); All: Charlotte Greengrass (22)
- Highest home attendance: 5082 v Derby County; 16 October 2022 (FA WNL Northern Premier Division)
- Lowest home attendance: 164 v Loughborough Lightning; 13 October 2022 (FA WNL Northern Premier Division)
- Average home league attendance: 931
- Biggest win: 12 – 1 v AFC Fylde (Away); 15 January 2023 (FA WNL Northern Premier Division)
- Biggest defeat: 0 – 3 v Sheffield United (Away); 8 January 2023 (Women's FA Cup)
Home colours	Away colours	Third colours

The 2022–23 season was Nottingham Forest Women's fifth consecutive season in the FA Women's National League Northern Premier Division, which stands at level three of the women's football league pyramid.

The club won the FA Women's National League Northern Premier Division, but failed to gain promotion to the Women's Championship having lost in the Championship Play Off final to Watford.

Forest also won the FA Women's National League Cup, beating Watford 3-2 in the final.

== Squad information ==
=== First team squad ===
As of 7 October 2022

No.	Name	Nat.	Date of birth (age)	Since	Signed from
Goalkeepers
1	Emily Batty	(England)	2 November 1998 (age 28)	18 July 2021	(England) Sheffield United
18	Aja Aguirre	(Canada)	18 November 1991 (age 34)	1 July 2019	(England) Aston Villa
Defenders
2	Lyndsey Harkin	(England)	30 August 1991 (age 35)	1 February 2016	(England) Doncaster Rovers Belles
3	Georgia Hewitt	(England)	12 June 1994 (age 32)	1 August 2018	(England) Derby County
4	Lauren Purchase	(Wales)	29 June 2004 (age 22)	9 August 2022	(England) Aston Villa
5	Olivia Cook	(England)	10 January 2001 (age 25)	1 July 2019	(England) Doncaster Rovers Belles
14	Arryana Daniels	(United States)	1 September 2001 (age 25)	1 September 2021	(United States) Temple Owls
15	Laura-Jayne O'Neill	(England)	1 December 1994 (age 31)	1 July 2017	(England) Notts County
21	Hayley James	(England)	17 July 1995 (age 31)	1 August 2020	(England) Leicester City
32	Emily Jacobs	(England)	6 February 2003 (age 23)	-	Academy
Midfielders
6	Charlotte Steggles	(England)	18 March 1996 (age 30)	1 August 2020	(England) Leicester City
11	Amy West	(England)	10 April 1997 (age 29)	8 July 2021	(England) Aston Villa
12	Niamh Reynolds	(Republic of Ireland)	31 October 2001 (age 25)	1 August 2020	(England) Reading
17	Rosetta Taylor	(New Zealand)	8 November 2000 (age 26)	7 October 2022	(Spain) Valencia
19	Becky Anderson	(England)	-	2 July 2021	(England) Coventry United
23	MacKenzie Smith	(England)	27 May 2005 (age 21)	27 July 2022	(England) Leicester City
27	Naomi Powell	(United States)	10 January 1999 (age 27)	28 July 2021	(United States) NC State Wolfpack
Forwards
7	Sophie Domingo	(England)	7 January 2000 (age 26)	1 July 2022	(England) Derby County
8	Mai Moncaster	(England)	14 August 2001 (age 25)	1 September 2019	(England) Leicester City
9	Yasmin Mosby	(England)	15 November 1998 (age 27)	8 August 2022	(United States) Concord Mountain Lions
10	Iris Achterhof	(Netherlands)	9 May 1997 (age 29)	30 July 2022	(England) Sunderland
16	Gianna Mitchell	(United States)	-	1 February 2022	(United States) Florida State Seminoles
22	Charlotte Greengrass	(England)	-	1 September 2020	(England) Aston Villa

== Squad Changes ==
=== Transfers In ===
Date	Pos.	Player	From	Fee	Ref.
30 July 2022	FW	Iris Achterhof	Sunderland	Free agent	
8 August 2022	FW	Yasmin Mosby	Concord Mountain Lions	Free agent	
12 August 2022	FW	Sophie Domingo	Derby County	Free agent	
7 October 2022	MF	Rosetta Taylor	Valencia	Free agent	

=== Transfers Out ===
Date	Pos.	Player	To	Fee	Ref.

=== Loans In ===
Date from	Pos.	Player	From	Duration	Ref.
27 July 2022	MF	MacKenzie Smith	Leicester City	Season-long loan (Note: dual-registration loan)	
9 August 2022	DF	Lauren Purchase	Aston Villa	Season-long loan (Note: dual-registration loan)	

=== Loans Out ===
Date from	Pos.	Player	To	Duration	Ref.

=== Released ===
Date	Pos.	Player	Subsequent club	Date signed	Ref.
30 June 2022	FW	Rosie Axten	Stoke City		
30 June 2022	DF	Sophia Bonser	Loughborough Lightning		
30 June 2022	MF	Sophie Bramford	Stoke City	8 July 2022	
30 June 2022	DF	Rachel Brown	Sheffield United	5 July 2022	
30 June 2022	MF	Alice Higginbottom	Chelsea		
30 June 2022	FW	Lagan Makin	Retired		
30 June 2022	FW	Katie Middleton	Loughborough Lightning		
30 June 2022	DF	Grace Walters	Loughborough Lightning		

=== New contracts ===
Date	Pos.	Player	Contract length	Ref.

== Competitions ==
=== Overall record ===
Competition	First match	Last match	Starting round	Final position	Record							
Competition	First match	Last match	Starting round	Final position	Pld	W	D	L	GF	GA	GD	Win %
WNL Northern Premier Division	21 August 2022	20 May 2023	Matchday 1	Winners	22	17	3	2	81	18	+63	77.27
Women's FA Cup	13 November 2022	8 January 2023	First round	Third round	3	2	0	1	11	4	+7	66.67
WNL Cup	25 September 2022	23 April 2023	Determining round	Winners	6	6	0	0	22	6	+16	100.00
Total					31	25	3	3	114	28	+86	80.65

Source: Soccerway

=== FA Women's National League Northern Premier Division ===
==== Results summary ====
Overall								Home						Away					
Pld	W	D	L	GF	GA	GD	Pts	W	D	L	GF	GA	GD	W	D	L	GF	GA	GD
22	17	3	2	81	18	+63	54	10	0	1	34	7	+27	7	3	1	47	11	+36

Source: Soccerway

==== Results by round ====
Round	1	2	3	4	5	6	7	8	9	10	11	12	13	14	15	16	17	18	19	20	21	22
Ground	A	H	H	H	A	H	H	H	A	A	A	A	A	H	H	A	A	A	H	H	A	H
Result	W	W	W	L	D	W	W	W	W	W	W	W	L	W	W	W	D	W	W	W	D	W
Position	2	1	3	3	6	3	3	2	2	1	1	1	1	1	1	1	1	1	1	1	1	1
Points	3	6	9	9	10	13	16	19	22	25	28	31	31	34	37	40	41	44	47	50	51	54

Source: Soccerway
A = Away; H = Home; W = Win; D = Draw; L = Loss

==== Matches ====
Win Draw Loss Fixtures

21 August 2022 1	West Bromwich Albion	0 - 6	Nottingham Forest	Birmingham
14:00 BST		Report	Charlotte Steggles 41'; Charlotte Greengrass 52'; Gianna Mitchell 56'; Becky Anderson 69'; Mai Moncaster 76'; Yasmin Mosby 83'	Stadium: Excellence Arena; Attendance: 135

28 August 2022 2	Nottingham Forest	2 - 0	AFC Fylde	Eastwood
14:00 BST	Sophie Domingo 40' (yellow card); Olivia Cook 76'; Hayley James (yellow card)	Report		Stadium: Halbrooke Stadium; Attendance: 205

4 September 2022 3	Nottingham Forest	2 - 0	Liverpool Feds	Eastwood
14:00 BST	Mai Moncaster 13'; Charlotte Steggles 45+3'	Report	Ellie Fletcher (yellow card); Nicola James (yellow card)	Stadium: Halbrooke Stadium; Attendance: 264

18 September 2022 4	Nottingham Forest	2 - 4	Wolverhampton Wanderers	Eastwood
14:00 BST	Arryana Daniels 74'; Becky Anderson 75' (yellow card); Charlotte Greengrass (yellow card)	Report	Amber Hughes; Marie Gauntlett 35'; Katie Johnson	Stadium: Halbrooke Stadium; Attendance: 418

9 October 2022 5	Burnley	1 - 1	Nottingham Forest	Leyland
14:00 BST	Millie Grace Ravening 78'; Evie Priestley (yellow card)	Report	Charlotte Greengrass 17'; Olivia Cook (yellow card)	Stadium: County Ground; Attendance: 158

13 October 2022 6	Nottingham Forest	4 - 1	Loughborough Lightning	Eastwood
20:00 BST	Charlotte Greengrass 22', 52'; Georgia Hewitt 67'; Sophie Domingo 73'	Report	Chloe Young 87'	Stadium: Halbrooke Stadium; Attendance: 164

16 October 2022 7	Nottingham Forest	3 - 1	Derby County	West Bridgford
14:00 BST	Charlotte Greengrass 48', 67'; Niamh Reynolds 58'; Amy West (yellow card)	Report	Own Goal; Emelia Wilson (yellow card)	Stadium: City Ground; Attendance: 5082

23 October 2022 8	Nottingham Forest	3 - 1	Brighouse Town	Eastwood
14:00 BST	Niamh Reynolds 30'; Charlotte Steggles 64'; Hayley James 85'; Becky Anderson (yellow card)	Report	Imogen Porteous-Williams; Annabelle Cass (yellow card)	Stadium: Halbrooke Stadium; Attendance: 329

6 November 2022 9	Stoke City	0 - 5	Nottingham Forest	Stoke-on-Trent
14:00 GMT	Callan Barber (yellow card)	Report	Charlotte Steggles 37'; Sophie Domingo 40'; Yasmin Mosby 74', 78'; Olivia Cook 89'	Stadium: Norton Cricket Club & Miners Welfare Institute; Attendance: 91

15 January 2023 10	AFC Fylde	1 - 12	Nottingham Forest	Warton
14:00 GMT	Emily Hollinshead	Report	Yasmin Mosby 14', 55', 59'; Sophie Domingo 16'; Amy West 28', 45'; Becky Anderson 32', 35'; Charlotte Steggles 64', 69'; Gianna Mitchell 90'	Stadium: Kellamergh Park; Attendance: 93

29 January 2023 11	Huddersfield Town	0 - 3	Nottingham Forest	Kirkburton
14:00 GMT	Brittany Sanderson (yellow card); Lauren Joyce (red card)	Report	Charlotte Steggles 9'; , 26' (o.g.); Charlotte Greengrass 47'; Mai Moncaster (yellow card)	Stadium: Stafflex Arena; Attendance: 93

5 February 2023 12	Liverpool Feds	2 - 4	Nottingham Forest	Liverpool
14:00 GMT	Katie Thomas 58'; Bethany Donoghue 89'	Report	Charlotte Greengrass 25'; Sophie Domingo 34', 86'; Charlotte Steggles 55'	Stadium: Jericho Lane Football Hub; Attendance: 85

12 February 2023 13	Wolverhampton Wanderers	3 - 1	Nottingham Forest	Telford
14:00 GMT	Destiney Toussaint 10'; Jade Cross 45+5', 63'; Beth Merrick (yellow card); Laura Cooper (yellow card)	Report	Charlotte Greengrass 8'; Sophie Domingo (yellow card); Lyndsey Harkin (yellow card); MacKenzie Smith (yellow card)	Stadium: New Bucks Head; Attendance: 551

19 February 2023 14	Nottingham Forest	4 - 0	Boldmere St Michaels	Eastwood
14:00 GMT	Charlotte Greengrass 2', 45', 86'; Sophie Domingo 28'	Report		Stadium: Halbrooke Stadium; Attendance: 421

26 February 2023 15	Nottingham Forest	3 - 0	Huddersfield Town	Eastwood
14:00 GMT	Charlotte Steggles 20'; Charlotte Greengrass 62', 74'; Amy West (yellow card)	Report	Arabella Suttie (yellow card); Serena Fletcher (red card)	Stadium: Halbrooke Stadium; Attendance: 488

12 March 2023 16	Boldmere St Michaels	1 - 10	Nottingham Forest	Sutton Coldfield
14:00 GMT	, 90' (o.g.)	Report	Charlotte Greengrass 5', 58'; Amy West 18'; Yasmin Mosby 25', 50'; Arryana Daniels 45'; Mai Moncaster 53'; Rosetta Taylor 62', 67'; , 85' (o.g.)	Stadium: Boldmere Community Stadium; Attendance: 80

16 March 2023 17	Loughborough Lightning	2 - 2	Nottingham Forest	Loughborough
19:45 GMT	Kayleigh Hines 7', 43'	Report	Arryana Daniels 48'; Laura-Jayne O'Neill 84'; Becky Anderson (yellow card)	Stadium: Holywell Sports Complex; Attendance: 220

26 March 2023 18	Derby County	0 - 2	Nottingham Forest	Derby
14:00 BST	Emily Joyce (yellow card); Ella Hilliard (yellow card)	Report	Charlotte Steggles 29'; Charlotte Greengrass 60'	Stadium: Pride Park; Attendance: 5243

2 April 2023 19	Nottingham Forest	3 - 0	Burnley	Eastwood
14:00 BST	Sophie Domingo 17', 52'; Mai Moncaster 84'	Report		Stadium: Halbrooke Stadium; Attendance: 721

6 April 2023 20	Nottingham Forest	5 - 0	West Bromwich Albion	Eastwood
20:00 BST	, 11' (o.g.); Amy West 32'; Sophie Domingo 53'; Mai Moncaster 56', 63'	Report		Stadium: Halbrooke Stadium; Attendance: 418

16 April 2023 21	Brighouse Town	1 - 1	Nottingham Forest	Wrose
14:00 BST	Lucy Sowerby; Annabelle Cass (yellow card)	Report	, 55' (o.g.)	Stadium: Plumpton Park; Attendance: 175

30 April 2023 22	Nottingham Forest	3 - 0	Stoke City	Eastwood
14:00 BST	Becky Anderson 19'; , 84' (o.g.); Yasmin Mosby 89'	Report	Roisin Kivel (yellow card); Sophie Thompson (yellow card)	Stadium: Halbrooke Stadium; Attendance: 1736

20 May 2023 Championship Play Off Final	Nottingham Forest	0 - 1	Watford	Milton Keynes
13:00 BST		Report	Poppy Wilson 17'	Stadium: Stadium MK; Attendance: 3007

=== Women's FA Cup ===
==== Matches ====
Win Draw Loss Fixtures

13 November 2022 1	Oughtibridge War Memorial	0 - 6	Nottingham Forest	Oughtibridge
13:00 GMT		Report	Arryana Daniels 19', 58'; Yasmin Mosby 40', 51'; Georgia Hewitt 66'; Rosetta Taylor	Stadium: Oughtibridge War Memorial Recreation Ground

27 November 2022 2	Wem Town	1 - 5	Nottingham Forest	Wem
14:00 GMT	Katie Doster	Report	Sophie Domingo 33'; Amy West 63', 65', 77'; Rosetta Taylor 66'	Stadium: Butler Sports Centre; Attendance: 161

8 January 2023 3	Sheffield United	3 - 0	Nottingham Forest	Scunthorpe
13:00 GMT	Courtney Sweetman-Kirk; Bex Rayner; Mia Enderby	Report	Becky Anderson (yellow card)	Stadium: Glanford Park

=== FA Women's National League Cup ===
==== Matches ====
Win Draw Loss Fixtures

25 September 2022 Determining	Leek Town	0 - 5	Nottingham Forest	Leek
15:00 BST	Chantelle Gallagher (yellow card)	Report	Becky Anderson 26'; Iris Achterhof 35'; Charlotte Greengrass 67'; Gianna Mitchell 69'; Mai Moncaster 80'	Stadium: Harrison Park; Attendance: 50

30 October 2022 1	Norton & Stockton Ancients	1 - 3	Nottingham Forest	Stockton-on-Tees
14:00 GMT	Bianca Owens	Report	Yasmin Mosby 15'; Charlotte Greengrass 42'; Arryana Daniels 45'	Stadium: Norton Sports Complex; Attendance: 75

4 December 2022 2	Stoke City	2 - 4 (a.e.t.)	Nottingham Forest	Stoke-on-Trent
14:00 GMT	Roisin Kivel 24' (yellow card); Sarah Woodbyrne 82'; Molly Holder (yellow card); Meg Bowyer (yellow card); Callan Barber (yellow card); Carra Jones (yellow card) (yellow-red card)	Report	Charlotte Greengrass 48'; Yasmin Mosby 50'; Rosetta Taylor 96'; Niamh Reynolds 111'; Becky Anderson (yellow card); Hayley James (yellow card)	Stadium: Norton Cricket Club & Miners Welfare Institute; Attendance: 71

22 January 2023 Quarter-final	Nottingham Forest	2 - 1	Burnley	Eastwood
14:00 GMT	Charlotte Steggles 33'; Gianna Mitchell 80'	Report	Alyssa Mae Aherne 84'; Dominique Cooper (yellow card)	Stadium: Halbrooke Stadium; Attendance: 427

5 March 2023 Semi-final	Nottingham Forest	5 - 0	Portsmouth	Eastwood
14:00 GMT	Lyndsey Harkin 38'; Becky Anderson 50', 64'; Charlotte Greengrass 59'; Mai Moncaster 90'	Report		Stadium: Halbrooke Stadium; Attendance: 429

23 April 2023 Final	Nottingham Forest	3 - 2 (a.e.t.)	Watford	Burton-on-Trent
15:30 BST	Charlotte Greengrass 43' (yellow card); Yasmin Mosby 52'; Gianna Mitchell 115' (yellow card); Becky Anderson (yellow card); Hayley James (yellow card); Charlotte Steggles (yellow card)	Report	Gemma Davison 2'; Poppy Wilson 64'; Nicola Gibson (yellow card)	Stadium: Pirelli Stadium

== Statistics ==
As of 25 July 2023

=== Overall ===
No.	Pos.	Player	League				FA Cup				League Cup				Total			
No.	Pos.	Player		Goal	Yellow card	Red card		Goal	Yellow card	Red card		Goal	Yellow card	Red card		Goal	Yellow card	Red card
1	GK	Emily Batty	22	0	0	0	3	0	0	0	2	0	0	0	27	0	0	0
2	DF	Lyndsey Harkin	22	0	1	0	3	0	0	0	5	1	0	0	30	1	1	0
3	DF	Georgia Hewitt	12 (5)	1	0	0	3	1	0	0	2 (2)	0	0	0	17 (7)	2	0	0
4	DF	Lauren Purchase	0 (2)	0	0	0	1	0	0	0	2	0	0	0	3 (2)	0	0	0
5	DF	Olivia Cook	19 (3)	2	1	0	3	0	0	0	6	0	0	0	28 (3)	2	1	0
6	MF	Charlotte Steggles	21 (1)	10	0	0	0 (2)	0	0	0	4	1	1	0	25 (3)	11	1	0
7	FW	Sophie Domingo	19 (1)	10	2	0	2 (1)	1	0	0	3 (2)	0	0	0	24 (4)	11	2	0
8	FW	Mai Moncaster	15 (4)	6	1	0	1	0	0	0	3 (3)	2	0	0	19 (7)	8	1	0
8	FW	Yasmin Mosby	9 (8)	9	0	0	3	2	0	0	5	3	0	0	17 (8)	14	0	0
10	FW	Iris Achterhof	0 (1)	0	0	0	0	0	0	0	1	1	0	0	1 (1)	1	0	0
11	MF	Amy West	17 (3)	4	2	0	3	3	0	0	5	0	0	0	25 (3)	7	2	0
12	MF	Niamh Reynolds	9 (8)	2	0	0	1 (1)	0	0	0	0 (6)	1	0	0	10 (15)	3	0	0
14	DF	Arryana Daniels	8 (10)	3	0	0	2	2	0	0	3 (2)	1	0	0	13 (12)	6	0	0
15	DF	Laura-Jayne O'Neill	7 (2)	1	0	0	0	0	0	0	1 (2)	0	0	0	8 (4)	1	0	0
16	FW	Gianna Mitchell	2 (15)	2	0	0	1 (1)	0	0	0	1 (2)	3	1	0	4 (18)	5	1	0
17	MF	Rosetta Taylor	0 (12)	2	0	0	1 (2)	2	0	0	0 (4)	1	0	0	1 (18)	5	0	0
18	GK	Aja Aguirre	0 (1)	0	0	0	0	0	0	0	4	0	0	0	4 (1)	0	0	0
19	MF	Becky Anderson	22	5	3	0	1 (1)	0	1	0	5 (1)	3	2	0	28 (2)	8	6	0
21	DF	Hayley James	14 (2)	1	1	0	2	0	0	0	3 (2)	0	2	0	19 (4)	1	3	0
22	FW	Charlotte Greengrass	22	17	1	0	1 (2)	0	0	0	5 (1)	5	1	0	28 (3)	22	2	0
23	MF	MacKenzie Smith	0 (4)	0	1	0	0	0	0	0	3	0	0	0	3 (4)	0	1	0
27	MF	Naomi Powell	2 (18)	0	0	0	2 (1)	0	0	0	3 (3)	0	0	0	7 (22)	0	0	0
32	DF	Emily Jacobs	0 (1)	0	0	0	0	0	0	0	0	0	0	0	0 (1)	0	0	0

=== Goalscorers ===
Rank	No.	Pos.	Player	League	FA Cup	League Cup	Total
1	22	FW	Charlotte Greengrass	17	0	5	22
2	9	FW	Yasmin Mosby	9	2	3	14
3	6	MF	Charlotte Steggles	10	0	1	11
3	7	FW	Sophie Domingo	10	1	0	11
5	8	FW	Mai Moncaster	6	0	2	8
5	19	MF	Becky Anderson	5	0	3	8
7	11	MF	Amy West	4	3	0	7
8	14	DF	Arryana Daniels	3	2	1	6
9	16	FW	Gianna Mitchell	2	0	3	5
9	17	MF	Rosetta Taylor	2	2	1	5
11	12	MF	Niamh Reynolds	2	0	1	3
12	5	DF	Olivia Cook	2	0	0	2
12	3	DF	Georgia Hewitt	1	1	0	2
14	15	DF	Laura-Jayne O'Neill	1	0	0	1
14	21	DF	Hayley James	1	0	0	1
14	2	DF	Lyndsey Harkin	0	0	1	1
14	10	FW	Iris Achterhof	0	0	1	1
Own Goals				6	0	0	6
Totals				81	11	22	114

=== Assists ===
Rank	No.	Pos.	Player	League	FA Cup	League Cup	Total
1	2	DF	Lyndsey Harkin	5	0	0	5
1	21	DF	Hayley James	3	0	2	5
3	16	FW	Gianna Mitchell	4	0	0	4
3	7	FW	Sophie Domingo	2	0	2	4
5	22	FW	Charlotte Greengrass	3	0	0	3
5	6	MF	Charlotte Steggles	3	0	0	3
5	9	FW	Yasmin Mosby	2	0	1	3
5	19	MF	Becky Anderson	1	0	2	3
5	8	FW	Mai Moncaster	1	1	1	3
10	12	MF	Niamh Reynolds	2	0	0	2
10	23	MF	MacKenzie Smith	1	0	1	2
12	14	DF	Arryana Daniels	1	0	0	1
12	5	DF	Olivia Cook	1	0	0	1
12	3	DF	Georgia Hewitt	1	0	0	1
12	15	DF	Laura-Jayne O'Neill	1	0	0	1
12	17	MF	Rosetta Taylor	0	0	1	1
Totals				31	1	10	42

=== Clean sheets ===
Rank	No.	Pos.	Player	League	FA Cup	League Cup	Total
1	1	GK	Emily Batty	11	1	1	13
2	18	GK	Aja Aguirre	0	0	1	1
Totals				11	1	2	14

=== Hat-tricks ===
Player	Against	Result	Date	Competition	Ref.
Amy West	Wem Town (A)	5 – 1	27 November 2022	Women's FA Cup	
Yasmin Mosby	AFC Fylde (A)	12 – 1	15 January 2023	WNL Northern Premier Division	
Charlotte Greengrass	Boldmere St. Michaels (H)	4 – 0	19 February 2023	WNL Northern Premier Division	
