= 2016–17 FA Women's Premier League =

FA Women's Premier League
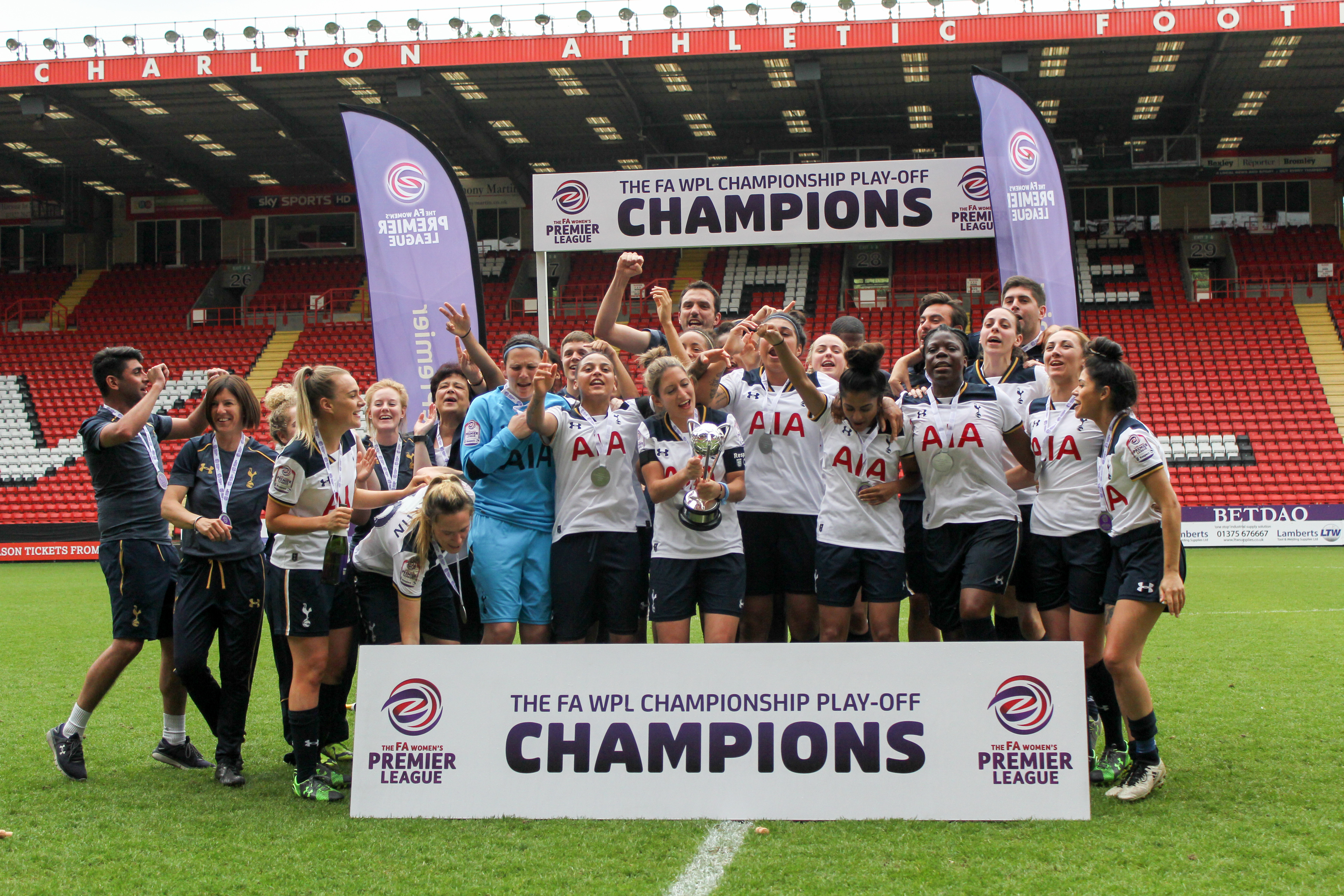
- Tottenham Hotspur celebrates winning the FA WPL play-off
- Season: 2016–17
- Dates: 21 August 2016 – 28 May 2017
- Champions: Tottenham Hotspur
- Promoted: Tottenham Hotspur
- Relegated: Blackpool Wren Rovers; Exeter City; Loughborough Students; Lowestoft Town; Tranmere Rovers

The 2016–17 FA Women's Premier League is the 26th season of the competition, which began in 1992. It sits at the third and fourth levels of the women's football pyramid, below the two divisions of the FA Women's Super League and above the eight regional football leagues.

The league features six regional divisions: the Northern and Southern divisions at level three of the pyramid, and below those Northern Division 1, Midlands Division 1, South East Division 1, and South West Division 1. 72 teams were members of the league before the start of the 2016–17 season, divided equally into six divisions of twelve teams. At the end of the season Blackburn Rovers and Tottenham Hotspur, respectively the champions of the Northern and Southern Divisions, qualified for a playoff match against each other which Tottenham Hotspur won 3-0 thus becoming the overall league champion, and winning them promotion to FA WSL 2.

== Premier Division ==
=== Northern Premier Division ===
FA Women's Premier League Northern Premier Division
- Season: 2016–17
- Champions: Blackburn Rovers
- Promoted: N/A
- Relegated: Newcastle United

Map showing the locations of the teams in the Northern Division of the FA Women's Premier League

Changes from last season:

- Guiseley Vixens and Loughborough Foxes were relegated to Northern Division One and Midlands Division One respectively.
- Leicester City and Middlesbrough were promoted into the Northern Division from Midlands Division One and Northern Division One respectively.
- Preston North End was renamed Fylde after changing its affiliation to AFC Fylde.
- Sporting Club Albion was renamed West Bromwich Albion.
- Nuneaton Town withdrew from the league the week before the season started.

Team	Home ground	2015–16 position
Blackburn Rovers	Sir Tom Finney Stadium, Bamber Bridge	3rd
Bradford City	Plumpton Park, Bradford	5th
Derby County	The Don Amott Arena, Derby	7th
Fylde	Mill Farm, Wesham	2nd
Huddersfield Town	The Stafflex Arena, Kirkburton	8th
Leicester City	Riverside Pavilion, Leicester	1st in Midlands Division One (promoted)
Middlesbrough	Teesdale Park, Thornaby-on-Tees	1st in Northern Division One (promoted)
Newcastle United	Sport Northumbria, Newcastle upon Tyne	9th
Nottingham Forest	Mill Street Playing Fields, Nottingham	6th
Stoke City	Wellbeing Park, Stone	4th
West Bromwich Albion	Dales Lane, Rushall	1st

==== League table ====
Pos	Team	Pld	W	D	L	GF	GA	GD	Pts	Promotion or relegation
1	Blackburn Rovers (C)	20	17	3	0	59	20	+39	54	Qualification for the Championship play-off
2	Middlesbrough	20	14	1	5	60	31	+29	43	
3	Leicester City	20	10	4	6	44	37	+7	34	
4	Stoke City	20	8	6	6	43	37	+6	30	
5	Derby County	20	9	2	9	39	35	+4	29	
6	West Bromwich Albion	20	8	3	9	33	37	−4	27	
7	Fylde (Note: Fylde had three points deducted)	20	8	5	7	36	30	+6	26	
8	Bradford City	20	7	1	12	40	40	0	22	
9	Huddersfield Town	20	5	5	10	37	53	−16	20	
10	Nottingham Forest	20	5	3	12	27	49	−22	18	
11	Newcastle United (R)	20	2	1	17	16	65	−49	7	Relegation to the Division One North
12	Nuneaton Town	0	0	0	0	0	0	0	0	Club withdrew from league before season began

Source: The Football Association
Rules for classification: 1) Points; 2) Goal difference; 3) Number of goals scored
(C) Champions; (R) Relegated

==== Results ====
Home \ Away	BLB	BRA	DER	FYL	HUD	LCW	MID	NEW	NOT	NUT	STK	WBA
Blackburn Rovers		4–2	3–2	1–0	3–1	2–2	5–1	3–0	4–1	X–X	2–2	5–1
Bradford City	0–4		0–2	1–2	1–0	4–1	0–2	0–0	6–0	X–X	5–1	2–1
Derby County	0–4	3–1		5–0	3–1	1–3	2–3	2–0	2–1	X–X	4–3	0–2
Fylde	1–2	3–2	0–0		6–1	4–0	0–3	3–0	1–0	X–X	0–2	2–2
Huddersfield Town	3–3	2–1	4–1	2–2		1–6	1–2	2–0	3–3	X–X	2–2	2–1
Leicester City	0–4	5–4	2–1	1–1	2–2		0–3	6–0	2–1	X–X	5–3	2–1
Middlesbrough	1–2	2–1	3–2	3–1	4–2	0–3		7–1	0–1	X–X	1–1	6–0
Newcastle United	0–1	1–5	1–4	1–5	6–2	1–0	1–6		0–1	X–X	1–4	0–5
Nottingham Forest	1–2	2–1	0–2	1–0	2–5	2–2	3–8	5–1		X–X	1–5	1–2
Nuneaton Town	X–X	X–X	X–X	X–X	X–X	X–X	X–X	X–X	X–X		X–X	X–X
Stoke City	0–2	1–3	2–1	3–3	2–0	1–2	5–1	2–1	1–1	X–X		1–1
West Bromwich Albion	2–3	4–1	2–2	0–2	3–1	1–0	0–4	2–1	2–0	X–X	1–2	

Source: The Football Association
Legend: Blue = home team win; Yellow = draw; Red = away team win.

=== Southern Premier Division ===
FA Women's Premier League Southern Premier Division
- Season: 2016–17
- Champions: Tottenham Hotspur
- Promoted: Tottenham Hotspur
- Relegated: N/A

Map showing the locations of the teams in the Southern Division of the FA Women's Premier League

Changes from last season:

- League champions Brighton & Hove Albion was promoted to FA WSL 2.
- Plymouth Argyle was relegated to South West Division One.
- Swindon Town and Crystal Palace were promoted from South West and South East Division One.
- Forest Green Rovers withdrew from the league the week before the season started.

Team	Home ground	2015–16 position
C & K Basildon	The Frost Financial Stadium, Canvey Island	8th
Cardiff City	CCB Centre for Sporting Excellence, Ystrad Mynach	3rd
Charlton Athletic	Bayliss Avenue, Thamesmead, London	2nd
Coventry United	Park Meadow, Coleshill	4th
Crystal Palace	Hayes Lane, Kent	1st in South East Division One (promoted)
Lewes	The Dripping Pan, Lewes	7th
Portsmouth	Privett Park, Gosport	5th
Queens Park Rangers	Honeycroft, West Drayton, London	9th
Swindon Town	Barrington Park, Shrivenham	1st in South West Division One (promoted)
Tottenham Hotspur	Cheshunt Stadium, Cheshunt	6th
West Ham United	Ship Lane, Aveley	10th

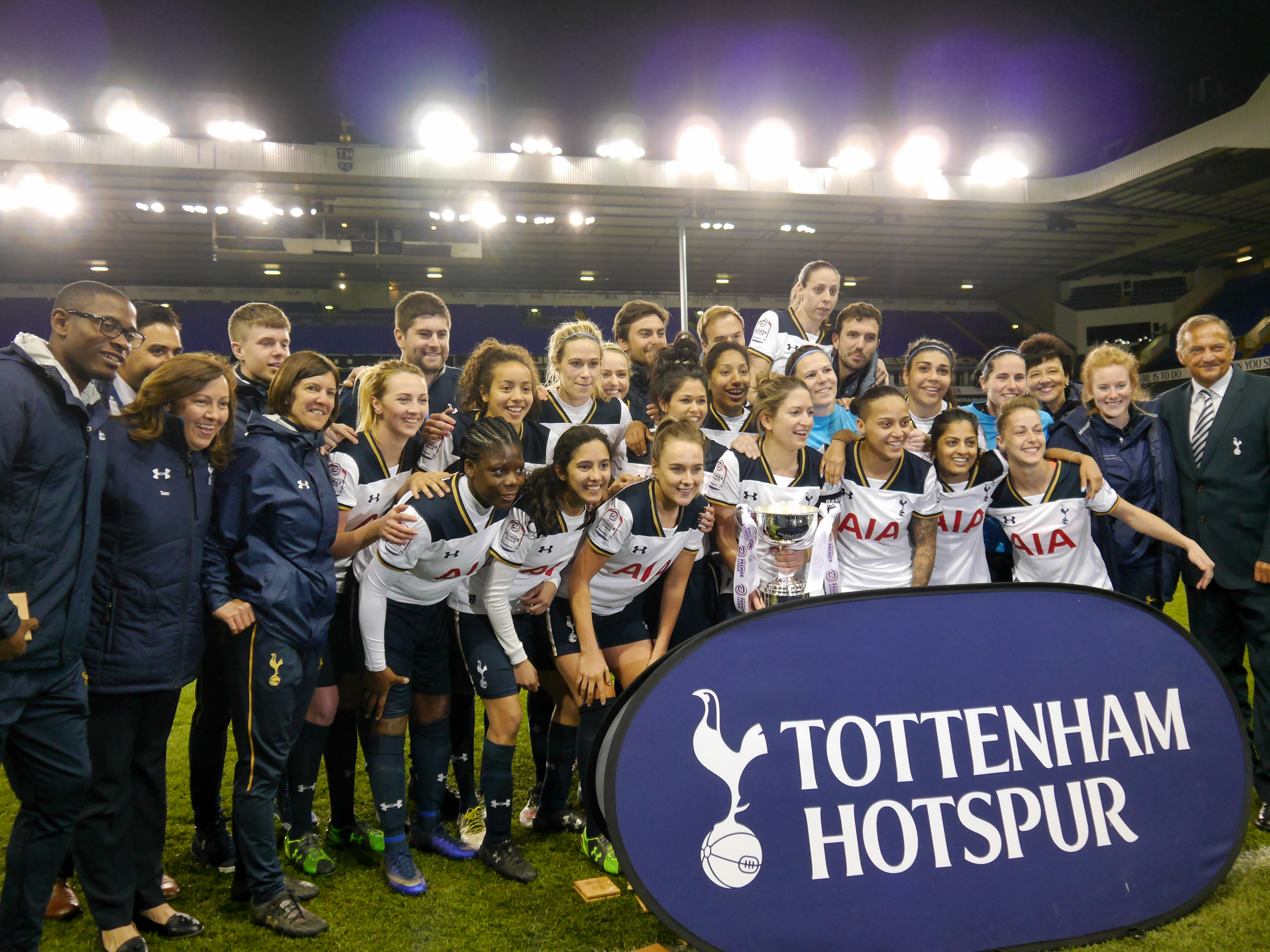
Tottenham celebrating winning the league.

==== League table ====
Pos	Team	Pld	W	D	L	GF	GA	GD	Pts	Promotion or relegation
1	Tottenham Hotspur (C, O, P)	20	17	1	2	58	13	+45	52	Qualification for the Championship play-off
2	Coventry United	20	15	3	2	55	15	+40	48	
3	Cardiff City	20	14	2	4	72	19	+53	44	
4	Charlton Athletic	20	13	3	4	55	25	+30	42	
5	Crystal Palace	20	9	6	5	48	23	+25	33	
6	C & K Basildon	20	8	3	9	29	42	−13	27	
7	Lewes	20	7	4	9	31	36	−5	25	
8	Portsmouth	20	5	2	13	31	66	−35	17	
9	West Ham United	20	1	6	13	12	59	−47	9	
10	Swindon Town	20	2	2	16	20	60	−40	8	
11	Queens Park Rangers	20	2	2	16	11	64	−53	8	
12	Forest Green Rovers	0	0	0	0	0	0	0	0	Club withdrew from league before season began

Source: The Football Association
Rules for classification: 1) Points; 2) Goal difference; 3) Number of goals scored
(C) Champions; (O) Play-off winners; (P) Promoted

==== Results ====
Home \ Away	C&KB	CAR	CHA	CVU	CRY	FGR	LEW	POR	QPR	SWT	TOT	WHU
C & K Basildon		3–2	4–3	0–3	2–2	X–X	0–2	2–0	4–0	2–0	0–4	0–1
Cardiff City	2–1		0–2	1–2	3–2	X–X	6–0	5–0	12–1	8–0	4–0	3–0
Charlton Athletic	6–0	1–4		1–5	2–2	X–X	2–1	4–2	2–0	4–0	0–1	5–0
Coventry United	6–0	2–2	1–1		1–0	X–X	3–1	8–1	5–0	2–1	0–1	1–0
Crystal Palace	5–0	0–1	3–3	2–2		X–X	1–1	7–0	1–0	3–0	0–1	6–1
Forest Green Rovers	X–X	X–X	X–X	X–X	X–X		X–X	X–X	X–X	X–X	X–X	X–X
Lewes	3–0	1–1	0–2	0–1	2–2	X–X		1–2	1–0	3–1	1–6	7–2
Portsmouth	1–3	1–5	0–3	1–3	2–5	X–X	4–3		3–2	5–0	1–4	3–1
Queens Park Rangers	1–4	1–4	0–6	0–2	0–1	X–X	0–2	1–1		0–7	0–4	1–1
Swindon Town	0–3	0–4	0–3	1–3	0–1	X–X	1–2	4–3	0–2		0–4	2–2
Tottenham Hotspur	1–1	2–1	2–3	2–0	2–1	X–X	2–0	4–0	3–0	4–1		4–0
West Ham United	0–0	0–4	0–2	0–5	0–4	X–X	0–0	1–1	1–2	2–2	0–7	

Source: The Football Association
Legend: Blue = home team win; Yellow = draw; Red = away team win.

=== Championship play-off ===
The overall FA WPL champion was decided by a play-off match held at the end of the season. The winner earned promotion to the FA WSL 2.

28 May 2017
14:00 BST (UTC+01:00)

Tottenham Hotspur (S)	3–0	Blackburn Rovers (N)
Baptiste 36', 67'; Martin 90+4'	Report

The Valley, Charlton, London
Attendance: 826
Referee: Sarah Garratt

Tottenham Hotspur

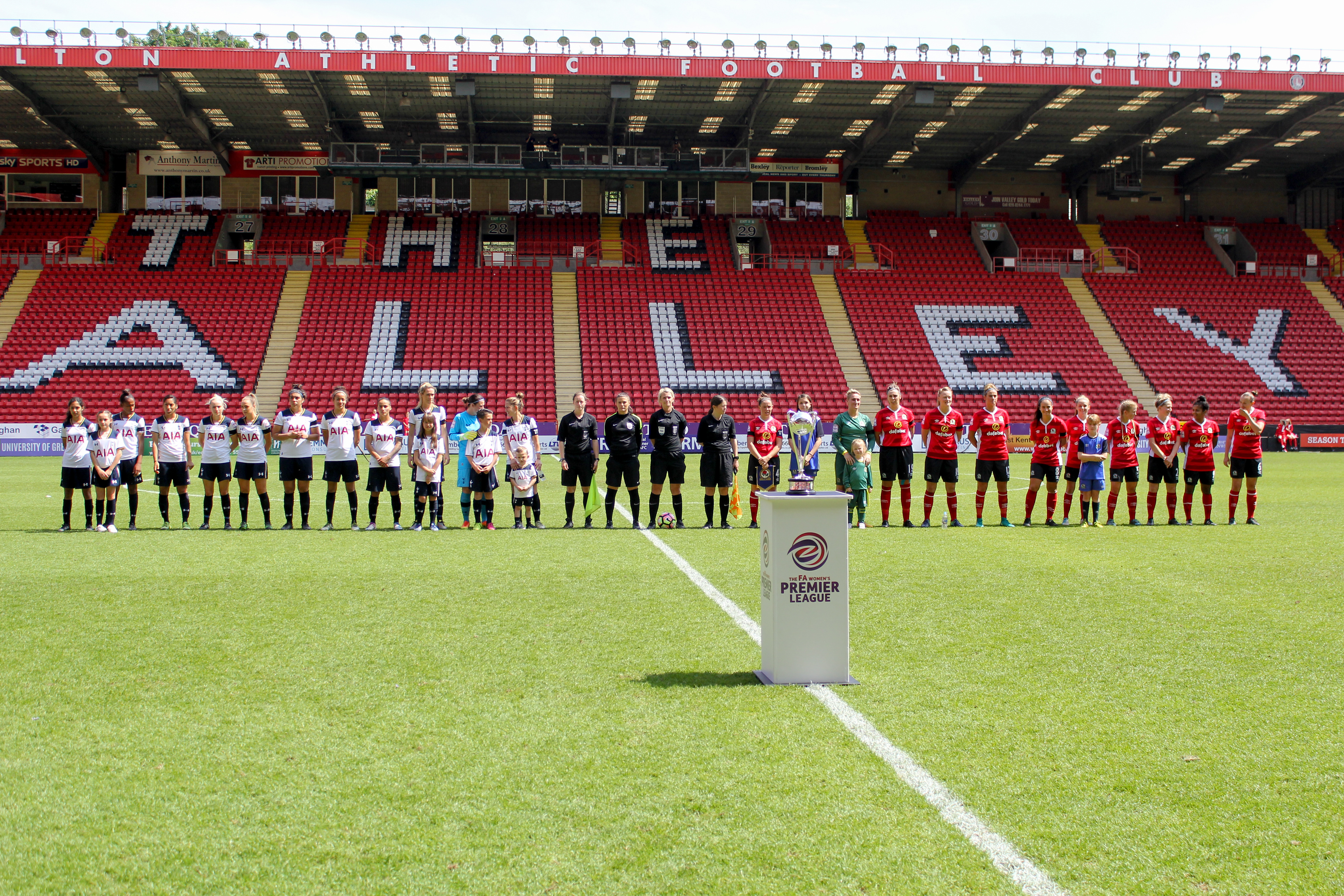
The two teams lining up before the start of the match

Blackburn Rovers

== Division One ==
=== Division One North ===
FA Women's Premier League Division One North
- Season: 2016–17
- Champions: Guiseley Vixens
- Promoted: Guiseley Vixens
- Relegated: Blackpool Wren Rovers; Tranmere Rovers

Map showing the locations of the teams in the Northern Division One of the FA Women's Premier League

Changes from last season:

- Middlesbrough was promoted to the Northern Division.
- Guiseley Vixens was relegated from the Northern Division.
- Brighouse Town was promoted from the North East Regional League.
- Crewe Alexandra was promoted from the North West Regional League.
- Stockport County and Norton & Stockton Ancients were relegated to the regional leagues.

Team	Home ground	2015–16 position
Blackpool Wren Rovers	Brews Park, Blackpool	8th
Brighouse Town	The Dual Seal Stadium, Brighouse	1st in North East Regional League (promoted)
Chester-le-Street	Moor Park, Chester Moor	9th
Chorley	Jim Fowler Memorial Fields, Leyland	3rd
Crewe Alexandra	Cumberland Arena, Crewe	1st in North West Regional League (promoted)
Guiseley Vixens	Nethermoor Park, Guiseley	11th in Northern Division (relegated)
Hull City	Hull University Sports Ground, Hull	4th
Leeds	Genix Healthcare Stadium, Garforth	5th
Liverpool Marshall Feds	I.M. Marsh Campus, Liverpool	2nd
Morecambe	Lancaster & Morecambe College, Lancaster	7th
Mossley Hill	Mossley Hill Athletic Club, Liverpool	6th
Tranmere Rovers	Ellesmere Port Sports Village, Ellesmere Port	10th

==== League table ====
Pos	Team	Pld	W	D	L	GF	GA	GD	Pts	Promotion or relegation
1	Guiseley Vixens (C, P)	22	19	2	1	72	20	+52	59	Promotion to the Northern Premier Division
2	Liverpool Marshall Feds	22	13	5	4	66	29	+37	44	
3	Hull City	22	14	1	7	54	38	+16	43	
4	Chester-le-Street	22	13	2	7	58	42	+16	41	
5	Chorley	22	12	2	8	51	44	+7	38	
6	Brighouse Town	22	11	4	7	50	34	+16	37	
7	Morecambe (Note: Morecambe had three points deducted)	22	10	2	10	51	50	+1	29	
8	Leeds	22	7	2	13	51	59	−8	23	
9	Mossley Hill	22	6	1	15	45	72	−27	19	
10	Crewe Alexandra	22	4	6	12	31	59	−28	18	
11	Blackpool Wren Rovers (R)	22	5	3	14	37	68	−31	18	Relegation from Premier League
12	Tranmere Rovers (R)	22	1	4	17	19	70	−51	7	Relegation from Premier League

Source: The Football Association
Rules for classification: 1) Points; 2) Goal difference; 3) Number of goals scored
(C) Champions; (P) Promoted; (R) Relegated

==== Results ====
Home \ Away	BWR	BRI	CLS	CHO	CRE	GUI	HUL	LEE	LMF	MOR	MOH	TRA
Blackpool Wren Rovers		1–4	4–2	2–3	2–0	2–3	2–3	1–5	2–2	3–2	2–4	0–0
Brighouse Town	4–0		2–2	3–2	2–2	0–4	1–2	1–3	3–3	0–3	4–0	1–0
Chester-le-Street	4–1	2–0		1–2	2–2	1–3	4–2	3–0	1–4	6–2	4–2	5–0
Chorley	3–1	2–6	3–1		4–1	1–4	2–1	5–1	1–6	2–1	1–2	5–1
Crewe Alexandra	3–3	0–4	0–2	0–4		4–2	0–1	3–2	3–3	3–0	1–1	1–1
Guiseley Vixens	4–0	3–1	1–0	2–0	3–0		6–2	1–1	1–1	7–0	3–2	4–0
Hull City	7–0	1–0	3–5	4–2	3–0	0–2		2–0	2–2	2–1	0–3	5–1
Leeds	5–1	2–4	3–5	0–1	2–1	1–5	0–2		3–4	1–2	7–1	1–1
Liverpool Marshall Feds	2–3	0–1	2–3	1–0	5–0	1–3	3–2	4–0		3–0	1–0	3–0
Morecambe	3–0	1–1	5–1	1–1	5–1	2–5	1–2	7–4	0–4		6–1	3–1
Mossley Hill	5–3	1–2	1–2	4–6	4–5	0–2	1–5	2–5	0–6	2–5		5–2
Tranmere Rovers	0–4	0–6	0–2	1–1	4–1	1–4	2–3	3–5	1–6	0–1	0–4	

Source: The Football Association
Legend: Blue = home team win; Yellow = draw; Red = away team win.

=== Division One Midlands ===
FA Women's Premier League Division One Midlands
- Season: 2016–17
- Champions: Wolverhampton Wanderers
- Promoted: Wolverhampton Wanderers
- Relegated: Loughborough Students

Map showing the locations of the teams in Midlands Division One of the FA Women's Premier League

Changes from last season:

- Leicester City was promoted to the Northern Division.
- Loughborough Foxes was relegated from the Northern Division.
- The New Saints was promoted from the West Midlands Regional League.
- Long Eaton United was promoted from the East Midlands Regional League.
- Peterborough Northern Star and Leafield Athletic were relegated to the regional leagues.

Team	Home ground	2015–16 position
Birmingham & West Midlands	Shenley Lane Community Sports Centre, Birmingham	5th
Leicester City Ladies	Linwood Playing Fields, Leicester	8th
Long Eaton United	Grange Park, Long Eaton	1st in East Midlands Regional League (promoted)
Loughborough Foxes	Loughborough University Stadium, Loughborough	12th in Northern Division (relegated)
Loughborough Students	Holywell Park, Loughborough	6th
Radcliffe Olympic	Wharf Lane Recreation Ground, Radcliffe-on-Trent	3rd
Rotherham United	Roundwood Sports Complex, Rotherham	9th
Solihull	Field Lane, Solihull	4th
Sporting Khalsa	Aspray Arena, Willenhall	10th
Steel City Wanderers	Thorncliffe Recreation Ground, Sheffield	7th
The New Saints	Park Hall Stadium, Oswestry	1st in West Midlands Regional League (promoted)
Wolverhampton Wanderers	Keys Park, Hednesford	2nd

==== League table ====
Pos	Team	Pld	W	D	L	GF	GA	GD	Pts	Promotion or relegation
1	Wolverhampton Wanderers (C, P)	22	18	2	2	57	18	+39	56	Promotion to the Northern Premier Division
2	Loughborough Foxes	22	18	0	4	111	31	+80	54	
3	Sporting Khalsa	22	13	2	7	57	33	+24	41	
4	Radcliffe Olympic	22	13	1	8	58	36	+22	40	
5	Birmingham & West Midlands	22	13	1	8	59	45	+14	40	
6	The New Saints	22	12	3	7	65	44	+21	39	
7	Long Eaton United	22	9	3	10	54	45	+9	30	
8	Steel City Wanderers	22	9	1	12	46	62	−16	28	
9	Solihull	22	6	5	11	41	55	−14	23	
10	Leicester City Ladies	22	5	2	15	27	88	−61	17	
11	Rotherham United	22	5	1	16	45	70	−25	16	
12	Loughborough Students (Note: Loughborough Students had one point deducted twice) (R)	22	0	1	21	19	112	−93	−1	Relegation from the Premier League.

Source: The Football Association
Rules for classification: 1) Points; 2) Goal difference; 3) Number of goals scored
(C) Champions; (P) Promoted; (R) Relegated

==== Results ====
Home \ Away	B&WM	LCL	LEU	LOU	LST	RAD	ROT	SOL	SPK	SCW	TNS	WOL
Birmingham & West Midlands		0–2	4–2	0–4	5–0	1–1	5–1	4–2	4–1	1–0	4–2	1–3
Leicester City Ladies	3–5		4–1	0–4	4–1	1–3	1–6	2–1	0–2	1–3	0–5	0–1
Long Eaton United	1–2	1–1		5–1	13–1	1–4	3–3	2–1	3–0	3–1	2–2	1–0
Loughborough Foxes	1–0	9–0	4–3		5–0	3–2	7–1	9–0	5–1	6–1	4–0	1–2
Loughborough Students	2–8	2–4	1–4	0–12		0–5	3–4	1–4	0–2	1–2	0–6	0–3
Radcliffe Olympic	2–1	13–0	1–2	3–1	5–3		1–0	3–2	0–1	1–0	4–0	0–2
Rotherham United	5–1	6–0	0–2	1–9	6–1	0–2		2–3	0–4	0–2	1–4	2–3
Solihull	0–4	0–0	2–0	1–7	6–0	3–0	4–0		1–2	1–3	2–2	0–0
Sporting Khalsa	5–1	8–0	4–1	1–2	4–0	4–1	4–2	1–1		4–0	5–1	0–2
Steel City Wanderers	3–4	4–2	3–2	4–10	6–1	3–5	3–1	4–3	2–2		1–3	1–5
The New Saints	0–2	8–2	5–2	3–5	3–1	5–0	4–3	3–3	4–2	2–0		0–1
Wolverhampton Wanderers	5–2	5–0	1–0	3–2	1–1	3–2	4–1	6–1	3–0	4–0	0–3	

Source: The Football Association
Legend: Blue = home team win; Yellow = draw; Red = away team win.

=== Division One South East ===
FA Women's Premier League Division One South East
- Season: 2016–17
- Champions: Gillingham
- Promoted: Gillingham
- Relegated: Lowestoft Town

Map showing the locations of the teams in South East Division One of the FA Women's Premier League

Changes from last season:

- Crystal Palace was promoted to the Southern Division.
- Stevenage was promoted from the Eastern Region League.
- AFC Wimbledon was promoted from the London & South East Regional League.
- Bedford was relegated to the regional leagues.
- Old Actonians was renamed Actonians.

Team	Home ground	2015–16 position
Actonians	Berkeley Fields, Greenford, London	10th
AFC Wimbledon	Borough Sports Ground, Sutton, London	1st in London & South East Regional League (promoted)
Cambridge United	Recreation Way, Mildenhall	6th
Denham United	The Den, Denham	9th
Enfield Town	Queen Elizabeth II Stadium, Enfield	7th
Gillingham	K Sports Cobdown, Aylesford	2nd
Ipswich Town	Dellwood Avenue, Felixstowe	5th
Lowestoft Town	Crown Meadow, Lowestoft	11th
Luton Town	Stockwood Park Athletics Stadium, Luton	4th
Milton Keynes Dons	Willen Road, Newport Pagnell	3rd
Norwich City	Plantation Park, Blofield	8th
Stevenage	Hertingfordbury Park, Hertford	1st in Eastern Region League (promoted)

==== League table ====
Pos	Team	Pld	W	D	L	GF	GA	GD	Pts	Promotion or relegation
1	Gillingham (C, P)	22	18	3	1	104	14	+90	57	Promotion to the Southern Premier Division
2	Milton Keynes Dons	22	16	1	5	63	21	+42	49	
3	AFC Wimbledon	22	13	5	4	57	28	+29	44	
4	Cambridge United	22	13	2	7	55	35	+20	41	
5	Luton Town	22	11	4	7	44	39	+5	37	
6	Actonians	22	10	6	6	51	37	+14	36	
7	Enfield Town	22	7	4	11	31	51	−20	25	
8	Denham United	22	8	1	13	38	59	−21	25	
9	Ipswich Town	22	7	4	11	36	58	−22	25	
10	Norwich City	22	4	4	14	31	81	−50	16	
11	Stevenage	22	3	6	13	19	45	−26	15	
12	Lowestoft Town (R)	22	2	0	20	21	82	−61	6	Relegation from the Premier League

Source: The Football Association
Rules for classification: 1) Points; 2) Goal difference; 3) Number of goals scored
(C) Champions; (P) Promoted; (R) Relegated

==== Results ====
Home \ Away	ACT	WIM	CAM	DEN	ENF	GIL	IPS	LOW	LUT	MKD	NOR	STE
Actonians		2–0	1–1	1–0	3–1	0–4	1–2	3–0	0–1	1–1	5–4	0–0
AFC Wimbledon	1–1		0–1	2–0	4–0	3–2	4–3	10–0	2–4	1–0	3–0	4–0
Cambridge United	1–2	1–1		7–0	3–2	1–2	4–1	2–0	3–1	0–2	5–4	3–2
Denham United	4–2	4–1	1–5		3–1	0–9	1–2	5–0	1–0	0–3	2–4	5–0
Enfield Town	2–2	2–3	2–1	2–0		0–7	4–1	5–1	0–5	1–2	2–1	0–0
Gillingham	7–1	1–1	4–1	2–0	6–0		1–1	5–1	10–1	3–1	13–0	5–1
Ipswich Town	0–1	1–4	0–5	2–2	1–1	0–6		3–2	0–1	1–4	5–1	2–1
Lowestoft Town	0–7	3–4	0–2	2–5	3–0	0–4	2–3		0–3	2–6	1–5	0–1
Luton Town	1–3	1–1	4–2	3–2	1–2	1–1	5–1	4–1		2–1	3–1	0–0
Milton Keynes Dons	4–1	0–2	4–1	7–0	1–0	1–2	5–3	1–0	5–1		7–0	2–0
Norwich City	0–11	1–1	1–3	0–2	2–2	0–9	1–1	4–2	2–1	0–2		0–0
Stevenage	3–3	1–5	1–3	4–1	1–2	0–1	2–3	0–1	1–1	0–4	1–0	

Source: The Football Association
Legend: Blue = home team win; Yellow = draw; Red = away team win.

=== Division One South West ===
FA Women's Premier League Division One South West
- Season: 2016–17
- Champions: Chichester City
- Promoted: Chichester City
- Relegated: Exeter City

Map showing the locations of the teams in South West Division One of the FA Women's Premier League

Changes from last season:

- Swindon Town was promoted to the Southern Division.
- Plymouth Argyle was relegated from the Southern Division.
- Basingstoke was promoted from the Southern Region League.
- Brislington was promoted from the South West Regional League.
- Gloucester City and Swindon Spitfires withdrew from the league during the 2015–16 season.

Team	Home ground	2015–16 position
Basingstoke	The Ark Cancer Charity Stadium, Basingstoke	1st in Southern Region League (promoted)
Brislington	Ironmould Lane, Brislington	1st in South West Regional League (promoted)
Cheltenham Town	Petersfield Park, Cheltenham	8th
Chichester City	Oaklands Park, Chichester	2nd
Exeter City	Minster Park, Exminster	5th
Keynsham Town	AJN Stadium, Keynsham	3rd
Larkhall Athletic	Plain Ham, Larkhall	4th
Maidenhead United	York Road, Maidenhead	7th
Plymouth Argyle	Haye Road, Plymouth	12th in Southern Division (relegated)
Shanklin^{[note]}	County Ground, Shanklin	9th
Southampton Saints	VT Group Sportsground, Sholing	6th
St Nicholas	Lodge Road, Yate	10th

^{[note]} Shanklin withdrew from the league after playing 18 of 22 matches. All results involving Shanklin were expunged.

==== League table ====
Pos	Team	Pld	W	D	L	GF	GA	GD	Pts	Promotion or relegation
1	Chichester City (C, P)	20	19	1	0	100	8	+92	58	Promotion to the Southern Premier Division
2	Plymouth Argyle	20	18	0	2	104	19	+85	54	
3	Southampton Saints	20	12	5	3	52	32	+20	41	
4	Keynsham Town	20	12	2	6	71	32	+39	38	
5	Larkhall Athletic	20	11	3	6	45	42	+3	36	
6	Brislington	20	6	4	10	44	63	−19	22	
7	Maidenhead United	19	5	2	12	26	54	−28	17	
8	St Nicholas	20	4	3	13	31	74	−43	15	
9	Basingstoke	20	3	5	12	29	57	−28	14	
10	Cheltenham Town	20	4	1	15	25	74	−49	13	
11	Exeter City (R)	19	0	4	15	16	88	−72	4	Relegation from the Premier League
12	Shanklin (X)	0	0	0	0	0	0	0	0	Resigned from league. Record expunged.

Source: The Football Association
Rules for classification: 1) Points; 2) Goal difference; 3) Number of goals scored
(C) Champions; (P) Promoted; (R) Relegated; (X) Resigned

==== Results ====
Home \ Away	BAS	BRI	CHE	CHI	EXE	KEY	LAR	MAI	PLY	SOS	STN
Basingstoke		0–2	1–0	0–5	5–0	2–6	1–1	2–2	0–6	2–4	2–0
Brislington	2–2		4–1	0–4	6–0	1–4	3–4	5–2	0–8	2–2	0–0
Cheltenham Town	2–1	1–3		0–4	4–1	0–3	1–3	3–2	2–5	0–3	2–1
Chichester City	4–0	7–1	4–0		5–0	5–0	2–1	3–0	3–0	8–0	10–0
Exeter City	3–3	2–2	2–2	0–13		0–5	2–7	0–1	0–6	0–1	2–5
Keynsham Town	6–1	4–0	7–0	0–2	13–0		1–5	2–1	1–3	0–0	5–2
Larkhall Athletic	1–0	3–2	3–2	0–2	2–1	1–1		5–1	0–4	2–2	3–1
Maidenhead United	2–1	4–5	2–1	1–4	P–P	1–2	0–1		0–8	1–1	2–0
Plymouth Argyle	4–1	5–1	17–0	4–5	4–1	5–2	7–1	6–0		1–0	4–1
Southampton Saints	3–1	5–3	3–2	1–1	2–0	3–2	6–2	4–2	0–3		2–0
St Nicholas	4–4	5–2	5–2	0–9	2–2	0–7	3–0	1–2	1–4	0–10	

Source: The Football Association
Legend: Blue = home team win; Yellow = draw; Red = away team win.

== Reserve Division ==
=== Reserve Northern Division ===
Map showing the locations of the teams in the Reserve Northern Division of the FA Women's Premier League

==== League table ====
Pos	Team	Pld	W	D	L	GF	GA	GD	Pts	
1	Blackburn Rovers (Note: Blackburn Rovers had three points deducted) (C)	16	11	3	2	50	17	+33	33	
2	Huddersfield Town	16	10	2	4	45	22	+23	32	
3	Newcastle United	16	9	3	4	41	19	+22	30	
4	Fylde Ladies	16	9	2	5	44	31	+13	29	
5	Middlesbrough	16	9	1	6	52	35	+17	28	
6	Bradford City	16	6	4	6	29	32	−3	22	
7	Guiseley Vixens	16	5	0	11	30	57	−27	15	
8	Hull City	16	2	2	12	18	58	−40	8	
9	Brighouse Town	16	2	1	13	25	63	−38	7	
10	Leeds (X)	0	0	0	0	0	0	0	0	Resigned from league. Record expunged.

Source: The Football Association
Rules for classification: 1) Points; 2) Goal difference; 3) Number of goals scored
(C) Champions; (X) Resigned

==== Results ====
Home \ Away	BLB	BRA	BRI	FYL	GUI	HUD	HUL	MID	NEW
Blackburn Rovers		2–0	4–2	1–1	6–0	1–1	5–0	5–0	3–0
Bradford City	1–1		1–0	4–1	5–4	1–4	5–1	0–5	0–0
Brighouse Town	1–5	1–5		2–4	3–4	0–8	2–0	6–3	0–4
Fylde Ladies	4–0	3–2	7–1		6–1	0–1	2–1	1–5	1–2
Guiseley Vixens	0–6	1–2	6–2	3–8		0–3	7–1	1–2	2–1
Huddersfield Town	0–2	1–0	2–1	2–2	3–0		4–0	8–3	0–2
Hull City	0–6	1–1	3–2	0–2	0–1	2–7		4–1	3–3
Middlesbrough	5–0	6–1	2–2	5–0	4–0	4–0	5–1		0–3
Newcastle United	2–3	1–1	5–0	1–2	5–0	4–1	5–1	3–2	

Source: The Football Association
Legend: Blue = home team win; Yellow = draw; Red = away team win.

=== Reserve Midland Division ===
Map showing the locations of the teams in Reserve Midland Division One of the FA Women's Premier League

==== League table ====
Pos	Team	Pld	W	D	L	GF	GA	GD	Pts
1	Stoke City (C)	18	14	2	2	60	15	+45	44
2	Leicester City Women	18	14	1	3	68	27	+41	43
3	Cardiff City	18	12	1	5	82	30	+52	37
4	West Bromwich Albion	18	9	2	7	43	39	+4	29
5	Derby County	18	8	4	6	47	39	+8	28
6	Coventry United	18	6	3	9	50	50	0	21
7	Nottingham Forest	18	5	5	8	45	49	−4	20
8	Sporting Khalsa	18	6	2	10	42	66	−24	20
9	Loughborough Foxes	18	2	2	14	27	80	−53	8
10	The New Saints	18	1	4	13	14	83	−69	7

Source: The Football Association
Rules for classification: 1) Points; 2) Goal difference; 3) Number of goals scored
(C) Champions

==== Results ====
Home \ Away	CAR	CVU	DER	LCW	LOU	NOT	SPK	STK	TNS	WBA
Cardiff City		5–0	3–5	4–3	3–1	7–0	10–1	3–4	10–0	0–2
Coventry United	1–4		0–4	0–7	9–1	1–2	8–2	2–1	6–0	1–4
Derby County	0–2	3–2		0–3	4–0	1–2	5–0	0–3	2–2	5–2
Leicester City Women	5–1	2–1	9–1		4–2	2–1	6–1	2–1	4–1	4–2
Loughborough Foxes	1–5	1–1	4–4	1–4		2–3	2–4	1–4	3–6	1–7
Nottingham Forest	1–1	4–4	2–6	1–4	12–0		4–5	0–5	1–1	4–0
Sporting Khalsa	0–8	2–2	2–5	2–2	1–3	3–2		0–4	2–0	3–0
Stoke City	4–1	6–1	1–0	3–0	3–0	2–2	3–1		10–0	2–1
The New Saints	0–11	0–5	1–1	1–5	1–3	1–1	0–12	0–3		0–2
West Bromwich Albion	2–4	2–6	1–1	4–2	5–1	4–3	2–1	1–1	2–0	

Source: The Football Association
Legend: Blue = home team win; Yellow = draw; Red = away team win.

=== Reserve Southern Division ===
Map showing the locations of the teams in Reserve Southern Division of the FA Women's Premier League

==== League table ====
Pos	Team	Pld	W	D	L	GF	GA	GD	Pts
1	Tottenham Hotspur (C)	20	15	3	2	71	28	+43	48
2	Charlton Athletic	20	13	3	4	44	19	+25	42
3	Crystal Palace	20	13	3	4	49	25	+24	42
4	Portsmouth	20	12	4	4	56	22	+34	40
5	Lewes	20	10	2	8	54	30	+24	32
6	Queens Park Rangers	20	10	2	8	50	47	+3	32
7	West Ham United	20	7	1	12	30	48	−18	22
8	C & K Basildon	20	6	4	10	42	64	−22	22
9	Milton Keynes Dons	20	6	0	14	31	50	−19	18
10	Denham United	20	3	2	15	24	71	−47	11
11	Southampton Saints	20	3	0	17	25	71	−46	9

Source: The Football Association
Rules for classification: 1) Points; 2) Goal difference; 3) Number of goals scored
(C) Champions

==== Results ====
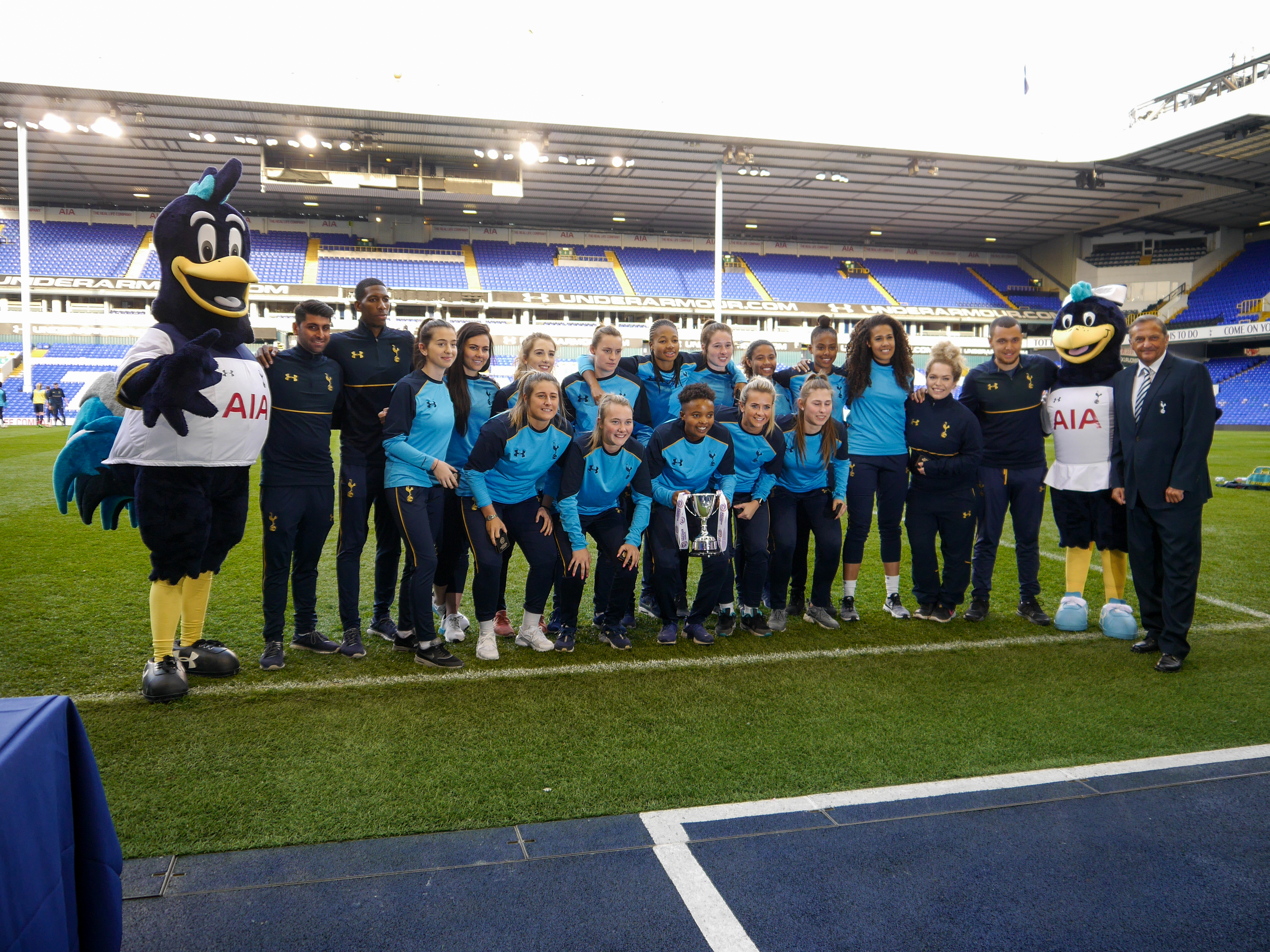
Tottenham Hotspur Reserve with the league trophy.

Home \ Away	C&KB	CHA	CRY	DEN	LEW	MKD	POR	QPR	SOS	TOT	WHU
C & K Basildon		0–0	2–2	0–0	3–6	1–2	0–5	5–4	4–3	6–1	0–1
Charlton Athletic	4–2		2–3	7–1	1–0	2–0	1–3	3–1	4–1	2–3	1–0
Crystal Palace	7–2	0–0		1–0	2–0	3–2	4–1	1–0	10–0	2–4	1–0
Denham United	2–4	2–3	0–2		1–6	4–1	0–5	2–2	3–1	2–5	2–1
Lewes	3–1	1–0	2–2	5–1		5–0	2–2	2–3	5–0	2–4	0–2
Milton Keynes Dons	2–3	0–1	1–3	1–0	3–5		0–4	1–3	3–1	1–2	5–1
Portsmouth	3–3	0–0	1–2	6–0	1–0	2–1		5–0	3–0	0–4	4–0
Queens Park Rangers	4–1	1–4	3–1	5–2	3–1	0–5	1–4		4–1	0–4	4–1
Southampton Saints	3–4	0–1	2–1	5–1	0–6	6–0	0–5	1–3		0–6	1–3
Tottenham Hotspur	8–1	1–2	3–1	6–1	1–0	4–0	2–2	2–2	1–0		3–3
West Ham United	4–0	0–6	0–1	5–0	0–2	0–3	2–1	1–7	5–0	1–7	

Source: The Football Association
Legend: Blue = home team win; Yellow = draw; Red = away team win.
