= 2021–22 FA Women's National League Plate =

WNL Plate

Tournament details
- Country: England
- Dates: 10 October 2021 – 24 April 2022
- Teams: 37

Final positions
- Champions: Nottingham Forest (1st title)
- Runners-up: AFC Wimbledon

The 2021–22 FA Women's National League Plate was the seventh season of the competition, open to those eliminated in the determining round of the WNL Cup.

== Results ==
All results listed are published by The Football Association. Games are listed by round in chronological order, and then in alphabetical order of the home team where matches were played simultaneously.

The division each team play in is indicated in brackets after their name: (S)=Southern Division; (N)=Northern Division; (SW1)=South West Division One; (SE1)=South East Division One; (M1)=Midlands Division One; (N1)=Northern Division One.

=== Preliminary Round ===
10 October 2021	Sporting Khalsa (M1)	5–2	Peterborough United	Willenhall
14:00	Anderson 21'; Hazell 22'; Gill-Parsons 38'; Handy 90+1'; Wright 90+4'	Report	Hipwell 34', 61'	Stadium: Guardian Warehousing Arena

10 October 2021	Norwich City	0–4	AFC Wimbledon (SE1)	Norwich
14:00		Report	Clapinson 11', 39'; Hincks 36'; Stanley 82'	Stadium: The Nest; Attendance: 50

10 October 2021	Maidenhead United	1–6	Queens Park Rangers (SE1)	Maidenhead
14:00	Matthews	Report	Blodgett; Hall; Hennessy; Moore	Stadium: York Road

10 October 2021	Leafield Athletic (M1)	3–1	Solihull Moors	Dickens Heath Sports Club
14:00	Clements 41', 44', 68'	Report	Jefferies 31'

10 October 2021	FC United of Manchester	0–3	Stockport County (N1)	Broadhurst Park Stadium
14:00		Report	Bradshaw 6', 45'; Battle 68'	Attendance: 108

=== First Round ===
7 November 2021	Holwell Sports (M1)	1–0 (a.e.t.)	Larkhill Athletic (SW1)	Melton Mowbray
14:00	Cropper	Report		Stadium: Welby Road

7 November 2021	Leafield Athletic (M1)	3–0	Leek Town (M1)	Solihull
14:00	Shirley 70'; Harris 77'; Johnson 90+3'	Report		Stadium: Dickens Heath Sports Club

7 November 2021	Sporting Khalsa (M1)	2–1	Lincoln City (M1)	Willenhall
14:00	Gill-Parsons 18'; Hazell 30'	Report	McHamilton 70'	Stadium: Guardian Warehousing Arena

7 November 2021	Bradford City	3–3 (a.e.t.) (2–4 p)	Boldmere St Michaels (M1)	Wrose
14:00	Roberts; Stube 40'; Stuart 111'	Report	Highway 20'; Sutton 35'; Dickinson 93'	Stadium: Mitton Group Stadium

7 November 2021	Stevenage (SE1)	1–3	Queens Park Rangers (SE1)	Letchworth
14:00	Nebbitt	Report	Hennessy 8'; Pope 30'; Hall 81'	Stadium: The County Ground; Attendance: 50

7 November 2021	Portsmouth (S)	2–0	Hounslow (S)	Havant
14:00	Albuery 30'; De Bunsen 53'	Report		Stadium: Westleigh Park

7 November 2021	Portishead Town (SW1)	6–0	Harlow Town (SE1)	Portishead
13:00	Clark 24'; Lindsey 44', 57', 72'; Quick 47'; Hill 81'	Report		Stadium: Bristol Road; Attendance: 58

7 November 2021	AFC Wimbledon (SE1)	3–2	Chesham United (SW1)	Wimbledon
14:00	Stow 10'; Sargent 51'; Stanley 61'	Report	Fraser 77'; Nuttall 81'	Stadium: Plough Lane

7 November 2021	Wem Town (SE1)	0–10	West Bromwich Albion (N)	Wem
14:00		Report	Dugmore; Beck-Esson; Straker; Congrave; Owen; George	Stadium: Butler Sports Centre

7 November 2021	Actonians (SE1)	1–2	Cheltenham Town (SW1)	Northolt
14:00	Ledezma-Viso 84'	Report	Grove 44', 65'	Stadium: Rectory Park

7 November 2021	Poole Town (SW1)	0–4	London Seaward (SE1)	Poole
15:00		Report	Anderson; Bradley; Trezzi; Dell	Stadium: Dorset County Ground

7 November 2021	Exeter City (SW1)	3–0	Keynsham Town (S)	Cullompton
14:00	Stacey 19', 25', 75'	Report		Stadium: Speeds Meadow; Attendance: 119

7 November 2021	Burnley	A–W	Alnwick Town (N1)	Crown Ground
14:00		Report

7 November 2021	Leeds United (N)	3–1	Stockport County (N1)	Tadcaster
14:00	Hunt 16'; Bass 56'; Brown 89'	Report	Goal	Stadium: Ings Lane

7 November 2021	Bedworth United (M1)	8–1	Buckland Athletic (SW1)	Bedworth
14:00	Stanley; Miller; Hunter; McGuckin; Taylor	Report	Barriball 57'	Stadium: The Oval

7 November 2021	Doncaster Rovers Belles (M1)	0–1	Nottingham Forest (N)	Doncaster
14:00		Report	Moncaster 37'	Stadium: Oxford Street

=== Second Round ===
16 January 2022	Holwell Sports (M1)	A–W	Leafield Athletic (M1)	Asfordby Hill
14:00		Report		Stadium: Welby Road

5 December 2021	Sporting Khalsa (M1)	1–0	Boldmere St Michaels (M1)	Willenhall
14:00	Smith 40'	Report		Stadium: Guardian Warehouse Arena

5 December 2021	Queens Park Rangers (SE1)	0–4	Portsmouth (S)	Greenford
14:00		Report	Khassel 30', 68'; Albuery 46', 84'	Stadium: The Powerday Stadium

5 December 2021	Portishead Town (SW1)	1–2 (a.e.t.)	AFC Wimbledon (SE1)	Portishead
14:00	Torrington 30'	Report	Sargent 77'; Stow 91'	Stadium: Bristol Road; Attendance: 75

5 December 2021	West Bromwich Albion (N)	1–1 (a.e.t.) (4–5 p)	Cheltenham Town (SW1)	Sutton Coldfield
14:00	Dugmore	Report	Barbour-Gresham 90'	Stadium: Central Ground

5 December 2021	London Seaward (SE1)	0–3	Exeter City (SW1)	Walthamstow
14:00		Report	Pengelly 16'; 47' (o.g.); 49' (o.g.)	Stadium: Wadham Lodge Sports Ground

23 January 2022	Alnwick Town (N1)	2–0	Leeds United (N1)	Alnwick
14:00	Stewart 23'; McConnell 57'	Report		Stadium: St James Park

9 January 2022	Bedworth United (M1)	1–5	Nottingham Forest (N)	Bedworth
14:00	Miller	Report	Reynolds 2'; Brown 3'; James 4'; West 12'; Bonser 24'	Stadium: The Oval

=== Quarter Final ===
6 February 2022	Leafield Athletic (M1)	1–3	Sporting Khalsa (M1)	Barnsley
14:00	Clements 65'	Report	Hendy 7', 99'; Morley 107'	Stadium: Dickens Heath Sports Club

6 February 2022	Portsmouth (S)	3–3 (a.e.t.) (6–7 p)	AFC Wimbledon (SE1)	Havant
14:00	Albuery 88', 90+3'; Harney 105+1'	Report	Hincks 54'; Donovan 67'; Russell 120'	Stadium: Westleigh Park

6 February 2022	Cheltenham Town (SW1)	2–1	Exeter City (SW1)	Cirencester
14:00	Liggett 40', 57'	Report	Beck 3'	Stadium: Cornium Stadium

6 February 2022	Alnwick Town (N1)	0–1	Nottingham Forest (N)	Alnwick
14:00		Report	Steggles 67'	Stadium: St James Park; Attendance: 102

=== Semi Final ===
6 March 2022	Sporting Khalsa (M1)	1–4	AFC Wimbledon (SE1)	Willenhall
14:00	Smith 82'	Report	Hincks 46', 68', 75'; Stanley 61'	Stadium: Guardian Warehouse Arena

6 March 2022	Cheltenham Town (SW1)	0–3	Nottingham Forest (N)	Cirencester
14:00		Report	Mitchell 36'; Greengrass 36', 58'	Stadium: Cornium Stadium

== Final ==
21 April 2022
11:00

AFC Wimbledon (SE1)	1–2	Nottingham Forest (N)
Highman 25'	Report	Brown 13'; Anderson 33'

Armco Arena, Solihull
