= Becky Anderson (footballer) =

English footballer

Personal information
- Full name: Rebecca Anderson
- Position: Midfielder

Team information
- Current team: Wolverhampton Wanderers
- Number: 19

Senior career*
Years	Team	Apps	(Gls)
2019–2021	Coventry United	25	(2)
2021–2024	Nottingham Forest	65	(7)
2024–	Wolverhampton Wanderers		
- * Club domestic league appearances and goals as of 24 August 2024

Becky Anderson is an English footballer who plays as a midfielder for Wolverhampton Wanderers.

== Club career ==
=== Nottingham Forest ===
On 2 July 2021, Anderson signed for Nottingham Forest.

On 21 July 2023, Anderson extended her contract at Nottingham Forest.

On 24 August 2024, it was announced that Anderson completed a permanent transfer to Wolverhampton Wanderers.

== Career statistics ==
=== Club ===
As of 13 August 2024.

Club	Season	League			National Cup		League Cup		Other		Total	
Club	Season	Division	Apps	Goals	Apps	Goals	Apps	Goals	Apps	Goals	Apps	Goals
Coventry United	2019–20	Women's Championship	8	1	0	0	4 (Note: Appearances in the FA Women's League Cup)	0	0	0	12	1
Coventry United	2020–21	Women's Championship	17	1	0	0	3	1	0	0	20	2
Coventry United	Total		25	2	0	0	7	1	0	0	32	3
Nottingham Forest	2021-22	FA WNL Northern Premier Division	21	2	4	2	4 (Note: Appearances in the FA Women's National League Plate)	1	0	0	29	5
Nottingham Forest	2022–23	FA WNL Northern Premier Division	22	5	2	0	6 (Note: Appearances in the FA Women's National League Cup)	3	1 (Note: Appearances in the FA Women's National League Championship Play Off Final)	0	31	8
Nottingham Forest	2023–24	FA WNL Northern Premier Division	22	0	5	0	3	0	0	0	30	0
Nottingham Forest	Total		65	7	11	2	13	4	1	0	90	13
Career total			90	9	11	2	20	5	1	0	122	16
