= Midland Combination Women's Football League =

Midlands Combination Women's Football League
- Founded: 1998
- Folded: 2014
- Country: England
- Divisions: 1
- Number of clubs: 11
- Level on pyramid: 4
- Feeder to: FA Women's Premier League Northern Division
- Relegation to: West Midlands Regional Women's Football League; East Midlands Regional Women's Football League
- Last champions: Copsewood (Coventry) (2013–14)
- Most championships: Coventry City
- Website: Official website

The Midland Combination Women's Football League, also known simply as the Midland Combination, was a women's football league in England from 1998 to 2014. Until the creation of the FA Women's Super League in 2011, that sat at the third level of English women's football pyramid along with the three other Combination Leagues – South West, South East and Northern. The Midland Combination fed into the FA Women's Premier League Northern Division, and lay above the West Midlands Regional Women's Football League and the East Midlands Regional Women's Football League in the pyramid. For the 2014–15 season the Midland Combination was incorporated into the newly re-structured FA Women's Premier League as the FA WPL Midlands Division One.

== Clubs for 2013–14 season ==
Club	Finishing position 2012–13	Finishing position 2013–14
Copsewood (Coventry)	6th	1st
Curzon Ashton Ladies	8th	8th
Leafield Athletic	4th	5th
Leicester City Ladies	2nd	4th
Leicester City Women	9th in Northern Division	2nd
Loughborough Foxes	9th	7th
Loughborough Students	7th	6th
Mansfield Town	1st in East Midlands	9th
Radcliffe Olympic	3rd	11th
Rotherham United Ladies	5th	3rd
Solihull Ladies	1st in West Midlands	10th

== Previous winners ==
Season	Winner
1998–99	Birmingham City
1999–00	Newcastle Town
2000–01	Mansfield Town
2001–02	Lincoln City
2002–03	Chesterfield
2003–04	Coventry City
2004–05	Nottingham Forest
2005–06	Crewe Alexandra
2006–07	Rotherham United
2007–08	Leicester City
2008–09	Derby County
2009–10	Coventry City
2010–11	Sporting Club Albion
2011–12	Wolverhampton Wanderers
2012–13	Stoke City
2013–14	Copsewood (Coventry)
