= 2022–23 FA Women's National League Cup =

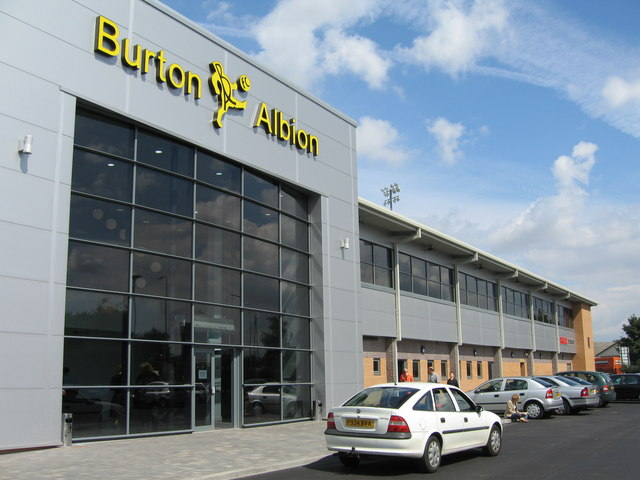
- The Pirelli Stadium hosted the final

Tournament details
- Country: England; Wales
- Dates: 25 September 2022 – 23 April 2023
- Teams: 72

Final positions
- Champions: Nottingham Forest (1st title)
- Runners-up: Watford

Tournament statistics
- Matches played: 70
- All statistics correct as of 31 August 2023.

The 2022–23 FA Women's National League Cup was the 31st running of the FA Women's National League Cup, which began in 1991. It is the major league cup competition run by the FA Women's National League, and is run alongside their secondary league cup competition, the National League Plate.

All 72 Premier League clubs entered at the Determining round, with the winners continuing in the competition and the losers going into the National League Plate tournament.

Southampton were the defending champions, but were unable to defend their title following promotion to the Championship.

The final was played at the Pirelli Stadium on 23 April 2023 between Nottingham Forest and Watford. Nottingham Forest claimed their first title following a 3–2 win after extra time.

== Results ==
All results listed are published by The Football Association. Games are listed by round in chronological order, and then in alphabetical order of the home team where matches were played simultaneously.

The division each team play in is indicated in brackets after their name: (S)=Southern Division; (N)=Northern Division; (SW1)=South West Division One; (SE1)=South East Division One; (M1)=Midlands Division One; (N1)=Northern Division One.

=== Determining Round ===
24 September 2022	Lincoln City (M1)	1–9	Newcastle United (N1)
14:00	Rousseau 44'	Report	Barker; Gibson; Robson; Greenslade	Attendance: 695

25 September 2022	Chorley (N1)	3–1	Bradford City (N1)
14:00	Gillin; Cleary; Payton	Report	Jacobs	Attendance: 108

25 September 2022	AFC Fylde (N)	1–2	Derby County (N)
14:00	Fields 56'	Report	Gaspar 16', 49'	Attendance: 136

25 September 2022	Wem Town (N)	0–4	Barnsley (N1)
14:00		Report	Pierrepont; Shaw	Attendance: 48

25 September 2022	West Bromwich Albion (N)	1–5 (a.e.t.)	Liverpool Feds (N)
14:00	Straker	Report	Cole 37', 103', 120'; Kinvig 98'; Rogers 100'

25 September 2022	Hull City (N1)	1–3	Burnley (N)
14:00	Knight 69'	Report	Ravening 28', 64'; Kelly 89'

25 September 2022	Peterborough United (M1)	0–1 (a.e.t.)	Stockport County (N1)
14:00		Report	Figueiredo	Attendance: 353

25 September 2022	Boldmere St Michaels (M1)	2–4	Stoke City (N)
14:00	Formaston; Jefferies	Report	Jones; Richardson	Attendance: 50

25 September 2022	Norton & Stockton Ancients (N1)	2–1	Long Eaton United (M1)
14:00	Hockaday; Myers	Report	Brennan	Attendance: 55

25 September 2022	London Seaward (SE1)	2–1	Swindon Town (SW1)
14:00	Lanza 42'; Laudat 70'	Report	Colston 69'	Attendance: 30

25 September 2022	AFC St Austell (SW1)	1–5	Plymouth Argyle (S)
14:00	Johanning	Report	Greenslade 18', 21'; Ireland 47'; Whitmore 59'	Attendance: 115

25 September 2022	Cardiff City (SW1)	1–0	Southampton Women (SW1)
14:00	Sargent 19'	Report		Attendance: 95

25 September 2022	Cambridge City (SE1)	2–4	Actonians (SE1)
14:00	Stanley; Stephenson	Report	Ledezma-Viso 2'; Williamson 13', 39'; Shakes 34'

25 September 2022	Portsmouth (S)	4–1	Crawley Wasps (S)
14:00	Hill 19'; Younger 25'; Quirk 42', 45'	Report	Chong	Attendance: 209

25 September 2022	Hounslow (SE1)	1–6	Larkhall Athletic (SW1)
14:00	Goal	Report	Hull; Newton; H. Price; S. Price; Snook	Attendance: 40

25 September 2022	AFC Bournemouth (SE1)	0–0 (a.e.t.) (3–5 p)	Oxford United (S)
14:00		Report		Attendance: 224

25 September 2022	Bridgewater United (S)	1–0	Billericay Town (S)
14:00	Kendell 62'	Report

25 September 2022	Cheltenham Town (SW1)	2–4	A F C Wimbledon (SE1)
14:00	Congrave 18'; Collis 84'	Report	Dorey 5'; Hincks 21', 54', 61'	Attendance: 105

25 September 2022	Watford (S)	6–0	Norwich City (SE1)
14:00	Head 3'; Ward 11', 30', 90'; Fyfe 53'; Gibson 80'	Report		Attendance: 285

25 September 2022	Queens Park Rangers (SE)	0–7	Ipswich Town (S)
14:00		Report	Biggs; Evans; Lafayette; Grey; Thomas	Attendance: 69

25 September 2022	Hastag United (SE1)	7–0	Ashford Town (SE1)
14:00	Gille 2', 67'; Nutman 7', 45'; Gillard 63'; West 66'; Frazzoni 69'	Report		Attendance: 40

25 September 2022	Exeter City (SW1)	3–1	Maidenhead United (SW1)
14:00	Pengelly 3', 60'; Watkins 39'	Report	Halfacree	Attendance: 133

25 September 2022	Portishead Town (SW1)	0–1	London Bees (S)
14:00		Report	Potter

25 September 2022	Keynsham Town (SW1)	1–0	Moneyfields (SW1)
14:00	Vipond 102'	Report		Attendance: 30

25 September 2022	Selsey (SW1)	0–1	Milton Keynes Dons (S)
14:00		Report	McLean	Attendance: 110

25 September 2022	Cambridge United (SE1)	1–5	Gillingham (S)
14:00	Goal	Report	Leitch 2'; Carabott 24'; Goad 51', 57'; Fordjour 88'	Attendance: 45

25 September 2022	Northampton Town (M1)	0–5	Wolverhampton Wanderers (N)
14:00		Report	Holmes; Hughes; Miller; Morphet	Attendance: 120

25 September 2022	Brighouse Town (N)	4–1	Leafield Athletic (M1)
14:00	Dean; Saxton; Watson	Report	Shirley 79'	Attendance: 102

25 September 2022	Sporting Khalsa (M1)	2–3	Durham Cestria (N1)
14:00	Hall 59'; Lampitt 66'	Report	Atkinson 49', 55'; Pritchard 85'

25 September 2022	Doncaster Rover Belles (M1)	1–2	Mersey Rail (N1))
14:00	Dean	Report	Cloy; Lancaster	Attendance: 274

25 September 2022	Sheffield (M1)	1–2	Middlesbrough (N1)
14:00	Waite 87'	Report	Harland	Attendance: 88

25 September 2022	York City (N1)	2–0	Leeds United (N1)
14:00	Brown 55'	Report		Attendance: 142

25 September 2022	Loughborough Lightning (N)	2–0	Solihul Motors (M1)
14:00	Sharpe 14'; Robinson 77'	Report		Attendance: 108

25 September 2022	Huddersfield Town (N)	2–1	Stourbridge (M1)
14:00	Elford	Report	Rogers 36'	Attendance: 68

25 September 2022	Leek Town (M1)	0–5	Nottingham Forest (N)
15:00		Report	Anderson 26'; Achterhof 35'; Greengrass 67'; Mitchell 69'; Moncaster 80'	Attendance: 50

=== Preliminary Round ===
With 36 teams progressing from the determining round, four need to be eliminated to allow a single-elimination knockout tournament to take place. Twenty eight of the winners from the determining round were given byes to the first round, with eight teams being drawn against each other in preliminary round ties.

9 October 2022	Barnsley (N1)	1–2 (a.e.t.)	Liverpool Feds (N)	Barnsley
14:00	Parkin	Report	James 2'; Devereaux 118'	Stadium: Houghton Main Miners Welfare Ground; Attendance: 60

9 October 2022	Chesham United (SE1)	0–3	Gillingham (S)	Chesham
14:00		Report	Grant 22'; Maslak 45+1'; Carabott 75'	Stadium: The Meadow; Attendance: 30

9 October 2022	Newcastle United (N1)	0–0 (a.e.t.) (1–4 p)	Durham Cestria (N1)	Newcastle
14:30		Report		Stadium: Whitley Park; Attendance: 750

30 October 2022	London Bees (S)	H–W	Keysham Town (SW1)	Canons Park, London
14:00		Report		Stadium: The Hive Stadium

=== First Round ===
30 October 2022	Chorley (N1)	1–2 (a.e.t.)	Derby County (N)	Coppull
14:00	Gillin 82'	Report	Hilliard 90+4'; Gaspar 114'	Stadium: Blainscough Park; Attendance: 108

30 October 2022	Liverpool Feds (N)	1–5	Burnley (N)	Liverpool
14:00	Stewart 69'	Report	Priestley 27'; Ravening 40'; Kelly 67', 87', 90'	Stadium: Jericho Lane Sports Hub; Attendance: 125

30 October 2022	Stockport County (N1)	0–2	Stoke City (N)	Stockport
14:00		Report	Kivel 39'; Barber 55'	Stadium: Life Leisure Stockport Sports Village; Attendance: 90

30 October 2022	Norton & Stockton Ancients (N1)	1–3	Nottingham Forest (N)	Stockton on Tees
14:00	Owens	Report	Mosby 15'; Greengrass 42'; Daniels 45'	Stadium: Norton Sports Complex; Attendance: 75

4 December 2022	London Seeward (SE1)	0–4	Plymouth Argyle (S)	Walthamstow
14:00		Report	Wilson 6', 22'; Morgan-Hemmens 55'; Pollock 79'	Stadium: Wadham Lodge Sports Ground; Attendance: 29

30 October 2022	Cardiff City (SW1)	4–3	Actonians (SE1)	Cardiff
14:00	Williams 6'; Scahill 17'; Lloyd 30'; Williams 48'	Report	Miyoshi; Netschova; O'Reilly	Stadium: Caerau (Ely) FC; Attendance: 95

30 October 2022	Portsmouth (S)	H–W	Larkhall Athletic (SW1)	Havant
14:00		Report		Stadium: Westleigh Park

30 October 2022	Oxford United (S)	2–0 (a.e.t.)	Bridgewater United (S)	Oxford
14:00	Cole 97'; Burridge 116'	Report		Stadium: Court Place Farm; Attendance: 208

6 November 2022	A F C Wimbledon (SE1)	0–1 (a.e.t.)	Watford (S)	Carshalton
14:00		Report	Garrad 120'	Stadium: Carshalton Athletic FC; Attendance: 207

6 November 2022	Hastag United (SE1)	2–0	Ipswich Town (S)	Aveley
14:00	Rowland 23'; Gillard 50'	Report		Stadium: Parkside Stadium; Attendance: 128

6 November 2022	Exeter City (SW1)	3–2	London Bees (S)	Exeter
14:00	Markham 6'; Watkins 21'; Stacey 24'	Report	O'Leary; Puddefoot	Stadium: Exwick Sports Hub; Attendance: 185

30 October 2022	Milton Keynes Dons (S)	1–0	Gillingham (S)	Wootton
14:00	Coupar	Report		Stadium: Weston Park Blue Cross Club; Attendance: 128

30 October 2022	Wolverhampton Wanderers (N)	1–0	Brighouse Town (N)	Wolverhampton
14:00	Darby	Report		Stadium: Sir Jack Hayward Training Ground; Attendance: 220

30 October 2022	Durham Cestria (N1)	3–2	Mersey Rail (N1)	Sunderland
14:00	Atkinson 72'; Pritchard 82'; Giles 86'	Report	Cloy; Collins	Stadium: Sunderland Ford Hub; Attendance: 50

30 October 2022	Middlesbrough (N1)	2–0	York City (N1)	Stockton On Tees
14:00	Mett; Dawson	Report		Stadium: Stockton Sixth Form College; Attendance: 191

30 October 2022	Loughborough Lightning (N)	1–2	Huddersfield Town (N)	Loughborough
14:00	Hines 67'	Report	Montgomery 16'; Fletcher 24'	Stadium: Holywell Sports Complex; Attendance: 160

=== Second Round ===
4 December 2022	Derby County (N)	2–3	Burnley (N)	Derby
14:00	McGrother 68'; Camwell 78'	Report	Greenhalgh 45'; Coleman-Evans 70'; Priestley 90+6'	Stadium: Mickleover Sports Club; Attendance: 259

4 December 2022	Stoke City (N)	2–4 (a.e.t.)	Nottingham Forest (N)	Stoke-upon-Trent
14:00	Kivel 24'; Woodbyrne 82'	Report	Greengrass 48'; Mosby 50'; Mosby 96'; Reynolds 111'	Stadium: Norton Cricket Club & Miners Welfare Institute; Attendance: 71

8 January 2023	Plymouth Argyle (S)	2–1	Cardiff City (SW1)	Plymouth
14:00	Cunningham 55'; Greenslade 67'	Report	Poole 54'	Stadium: Home Park; Attendance: 1518

18 December 2022	Portsmouth (S)	1–0	Oxford United (S)	Havant
14:00	Younger 34'	Report		Stadium: Westleigh Park; Attendance: 132

17 December 2022	Watford (S)	5–3 (a.e.t.)	Hastag United (SE1)	London Colney
18:00	Wilson 13'; Head 25'; Georgiou 27'; Ali 69'; Garrad 97'	Report	Rowland 20', 80'; West 70'	Stadium: UCL Sports Ground

4 December 2022	Exeter City (SW1)	0–2	Milton Keynes Dons (S)	Exeter
14:00		Report	Coupar; Nixon	Stadium: Exwick Sports Hub; Attendance: 137

4 December 2022	Wolverhampton Wanderers (N)	7–0	Durham Cestria (N1)	Wolverhampton
14:00	Hughes 5', 25', 49'; Toussaint 19'; Gauntlett 61'; Miller 70'; Taho 89'	Report		Stadium: Sir Jack Hayward Training Ground; Attendance: 235

4 December 2022	Middlesbrough (N1)	1–6	Huddersfield Town (N)	Stockton-on-Tees
14:00	Dawson	Report	Anderson 12'; Elford 23', 43'; Sanderson 50'; Hume 57', 67'	Stadium: Stockton Sixth Form College; Attendance: 82

=== Quarter-finals ===
22 January 2023	Burnley (N)	1–2	Nottingham Forest (N)	Eastwood
14:00	Aherne 84'	Report	Steggles 33'; Mitchell 80'	Stadium: Halbrooke Stadium; Attendance: 427

22 January 2023	Plymouth Argyle (S)	0–3	Portsmouth (S)	Plymouth
14:30		Report	Quirk 21'; Scott 56'; Humphrey 90+4'	Stadium: Manadon Football Development Centre; Attendance: 145

29 January 2023	Watford (S)	5–1	Milton Keynes Dons (S)	Ruislip
14:00	Ward 37', 57'; Head 80'; Rossiter 90'; Baptiste 7'	Report	Mitchell	Stadium: Grosvenor Vale; Attendance: 152

5 February 2023	Wolverhampton Wanderers (N)	3–2 (a.e.t.)	Huddersfield Town (N)	Telford
14:00	Cross 35'; Toussaint 33', 102'	Report	Ibbotson 48'	Stadium: New Bucks Head; Attendance: 282

=== Semi-finals ===
5 March 2023	Nottingham Forest (N)	5–0	Portsmouth (S)	Eastwood
14:00	Harkin 38'; Anderson 50', 64'; Greengrass 59'; Moncaster 90'	Report		Stadium: Halbrooke Stadium; Attendance: 429

5 March 2023	Watford (S)	2–0	Wolverhampton Wanderers (N)	Ruislip
14:00	Georgiou 16'; Brough 42'	Report		Stadium: Grosvenor Vale; Attendance: 226

=== Final ===
23 April 2023
15:30

Nottingham Forest (N)	3–2 (a.e.t.)	Watford (S)
Greengrass 43'; Mosby 52'; Mitchell 115'	Report	Davison 2'; Wilson 64'

Pirelli Stadium, Burton upon Trent
