= Shannon Albuery =

English association football player

Personal information
- Position: Forward

Team information
- Current team: Yeovil Town L.F.C.

Shannon Albuery is an English footballer who plays as a forward for Yeovil Town L.F.C.
