= Amy West =

English footballer

Personal information
- Full name: Amy West
- Date of birth: 10 April 1997 (age 29)
- Place of birth: England
- Position: Midfielder

Youth career
- -2014: Aston Villa

Senior career*
Years	Team	Apps	(Gls)
2014–2021	Aston Villa	96	(18)
2021–2023	Nottingham Forest	56	(14)
- * Club domestic league appearances and goals as of 28 July 2024

Amy West (born 10 April 1997) is an English professional footballer who most recently played as a midfielder for FA Women's National League North club Nottingham Forest.

West started her career at Aston Villa, being promoted from the academy in 2014.

== Club career ==
=== Aston Villa ===
She made her top flight debut coming on as a substitute against Reading on 13 September 2020.

In the 2018–19 season, West was announced as Aston Villia's ladies player of the season after an impressive season.

=== Nottingham Forest ===
On 21 July 2021, West signed for Nottingham Forest.

On 19 July 2023, it was announced that West would be leaving Nottingham Forest after making over 50 appearances during her time at the club.

== Career statistics ==
=== Club ===
As of 25 July 2024.

Club	Season	League			National Cup		League Cup		Other		Total	
Club	Season	Division	Apps	Goals	Apps	Goals	Apps	Goals	Apps	Goals	Apps	Goals
Aston Villa	2017–18	FA WSL 2	13	0	0	0	2 (Note: Appearances in the FA Women's League Cup)	0	0	0	15	0
Aston Villa	2018–19	Women's Championship	17	4	0	0	2	0	0	0	19	4
Aston Villa	2019–20	Women's Championship	14	3	0	0	5	1	0	0	19	4
Aston Villa	2020–21	FA WSL	6	0	0	0	3	0	0	0	9	0
Nottingham Forest	2021–22	FA WNL Northern Premier Division	16	2	3	0	4 (Note: Appearances in the FA Women's National League Plate)	1	0	0	23	3
Nottingham Forest	2022–23	FA WNL Northern Premier Division	20	4	3	3	5 (Note: Appearances in the FA Women's National League Cup)	0	1 (Note: Appearances in the FA Women's National League Championship Play Off Final)	0	29	7
Career total			86	13	6	3	21	2	1	0	114	18
