= Stoke City F.C. Women =

- Full name: Stoke City Football Club Women
- Nickname: The Potters
- Founded: 2001
- Ground: Wellbeing Park; Stone, Stoke-on-Trent
- Capacity: 1,000
- Head Coach: Sarah Richardson
- League: FA Women's National League North Premier Division
- 2025–26: FA Women's National League North, 4th of 12
- Website: stokecityfc.com/women
Home colours	Away colours	Third colours

Stoke City Football Club Women are an English women's association football club affiliated with Stoke City. They are currently members of the FA Women's National League North Premier Division the third tier of women's football in England.

The club were formed in the summer of 2001 and had a successful first season in the West Midlands league Division One finishing third before gaining promotion to the Premier Division via the play-offs. Season 2008–09 saw the Ladies gain promotion into the Midland Combination League. A title-winning 2012–13 campaign saw the team gain promotion to the FA Women's Premier League Northern Division.

== History ==
=== Early history ===
An early Stoke Ladies team was formed in 1921 by Len Bridgett, a director at Stoke. His side were generally referred as "Stoke United" and their games were mostly for charitable causes. They played against Dick, Kerr's Ladies from Preston twice in April 1921 in aid of the Royal Staffordshire Infirmary. However, in December 1921 the FA banned woman's football claiming it to be "unsuitable for females". Undeterred Bridgett arranged for his side to play in Barcelona against French side Les Sportives de Paris. They played two matches against Paris and won both. Their final match was against Dick Kerr's in Colne, on 22 September 1923.

=== Modern history ===
Stoke City Ladies were formed in 2001 and began playing in the West Midlands League Division One, the sixth tier of Woman's football in England. They finished in third position gaining promotion to the West Midlands League Premier Division. They spent the next seven season's in the fifth tier before winning the league title in 2008–09 after amassing 81 points scoring 95 goals and conceding only 14 in just 22 matches. They also won the Staffordshire County Cup four time in a row from 2009 to 2012. In March 2013 with the side well on top of the Midland Combination League the club decided to apply to join the expanding FA Woman's Super League, however their attempt was unsuccessful. They won their sixth County Cup by beating their reserve team 5–1 on 19 March 2013. They won the Midland Combination League title on 26 March 2013 beating Leafield Athletic 1–0.

The club re-branded in July 2019 dropping the "Ladies" sub-title becoming Stoke City F.C. Women. In March 2023 it was announced that the team are to turn semi-professional for the 2023–24 season. In July 2023, the team appointed Marie Hourihan as their first full-time head coach. In 2024–25 the team reached the final of the FA Women's National League Cup for the first time, losing 3–1 to Nottingham Forest at the Bescot Stadium.

== Players ==
As of 5 November 2026

Note: Flags indicate national team as defined under FIFA eligibility rules; some limited exceptions apply. Players may hold more than one non-FIFA nationality.

No.	Pos.	Nation	Player
13	GK	CAN	Maddie Crosbie
2	DF	ENG	Georgia Hewitt
3	DF	WAL	Lucia Molinari
5	DF	ENG	Olivia Cook (captain)
11	DF	ENG	Roisin Kivel
12	DF	ENG	Lyndsey Harkin
20	DF	WAL	Darcy Lancaster
4	MF	ENG	Fran Orthodoxou
6	MF	WAL	Seren Watkins

No.	Pos.	Nation	Player
7	MF	ENG	Sharna Wilkinson
8	MF	ENG	Holly Deering
10	MF	ENG	Abby Clarke
15	MF	ENG	Olivia Edwards
18	MF	ENG	Abi Loydon
9	FW	ENG	Delphi Cole
14	FW	ENG	Evie Priestley
16	FW	AUS	Racheal Quigley
17	FW	ENG	Shannon Stamps
19	FW	ENG	Megan Bradley

=== Out on loan ===
Note: Flags indicate national team as defined under FIFA eligibility rules; some limited exceptions apply. Players may hold more than one non-FIFA nationality.

No.	Pos.	Nation	Player
23	FW	ENG	Ruby Millington (at Sporting Khalsa)

== Honours ==
=== Leagues ===
- Midland Combination League champions: 2012–13
- West Midlands League Premier Division champions: 2008–09
- West Midlands League Division One third-place promotion: 2001–02

=== Cups ===
- FA Women's National League Cup runner-up: 2024–25
- Staffordshire County Cup: (16) 2006–07, 2008–09, 2009–10, 2010–11, 2011–12, 2012–13, 2013–14, 2014–15, 2015–16, 2016–17, 2017–18, 2018–19, 2021–22, 2022–23, 2024–25, 2025–26
- Midland Combination League Cup: 2012–13

== League history ==
Season	League									Women's FA Cup	League Cup	County Cup
Season	Division	P	W	D	L	F	A	Pts	Pos	Women's FA Cup	League Cup	County Cup
2001–02	West Midlands Division One ↑	20	14	2	4	83	17	44	3rd	—	—	—
2002–03	West Midlands Premier Division	20	10	4	6	58	43	34	4th	—	—	—
2003–04	West Midlands Premier Division	20	9	6	5	44	35	33	4th	—	—	—
2004–05	West Midlands Premier Division	18	7	3	8	34	33	24	6th	R1	—	—
2005–06	West Midlands Premier Division	20	7	3	10	36	53	24	7th	QR1	RU	R2
2006–07	West Midlands Premier Division	21	14	0	7	55	29	45	3rd	QR2	—	W
2007–08	West Midlands Premier Division	21	14	1	6	67	21	46	3rd	—	—	RU
2008–09	West Midlands Premier Division ↑	22	20	1	1	95	14	81	1st	R2	—	W
2009–10	Midland Combination League	22	9	6	7	49	44	33	6th	R3	—	W
2010–11	Midland Combination League	22	10	6	6	46	30	36	4th	R2	R1	W
2011–12	Midland Combination League	22	14	3	3	55	23	45	2nd	R3	R1	W
2012–13	Midland Combination League ↑	22	18	1	1	72	9	55	1st	R1	W	W
2013–14	FA Women's Premier League	20	10	3	7	51	45	33	5th	R3	R1	W
2014–15	FA Women's Premier League	22	8	2	12	38	38	28	7th	R4	R1	W
2015–16	FA Women's Premier League	22	14	2	6	59	28	46	4th	R3	QF	W
2016–17	FA Women's Premier League	20	8	6	6	43	37	30	4th	R1	R2	W
2017–18	FA Women's Premier League	22	12	4	6	52	38	40	4th	R2	R1	W
2018–19	FA Women's National League North	24	9	6	9	59	51	33	7th	R4	QF	W
2019–20	FA Women's National League North	14	8	1	5	32	17	25	4th	R2	—	—
2020–21	FA Women's National League North	8	3	2	3	15	22	11	7th	—	—	—
2021–22	FA Women's National League North	24	8	1	15	36	54	25	9th	R3	PR	W
2022–23	FA Women's National League North	22	7	3	12	32	49	24	10th	R3	R2	W
2023–24	FA Women's National League North	22	10	4	8	41	37	34	5th	R3	R1	SF
2024–25	FA Women's National League North	22	16	1	5	66	30	49	3rd	R4	RU	W
2025–26	FA Women's National League North	22	10	3	9	36	31	33	4th	R2	R1	W
