= Niamh Reynolds =

Irish footballer (born 2001)

Personal information
- Full name: Niamh Reynolds
- Date of birth: 31 October 2001 (age 25)
- Position: Midfielder

Team information
- Current team: Peterborough United

Senior career*
Years	Team	Apps	(Gls)
2017–2020	Reading	0	(0)
2020–2024	Nottingham Forest	41	(3)
2024–	Peterborough United		

International career^{‡}
2019–2020	Republic of Ireland U19	6	(0)
- * Club domestic league appearances and goals as of 6 August 2024 ‡ National team caps and goals as of 6 August 2024

Niamh Reynolds (born 31 October 2001) is an Irish footballer who plays as a midfielder for Peterborough United in the FA Women's National League Division One Midlands.

== Club career ==
=== Nottingham Forest ===
On 25 August 2020, Reynolds signed for Nottingham Forest.

On 21 July 2023, Reynolds extended her contract at Nottingham Forest.

On 9 May 2024, it was announced that Reynolds would be leaving Nottingham Forest after making over 65 appearances during her time at the club.

=== Peterborough United ===
On 28 June 2024, Reynolds signed for Peterborough United.

== Career statistics ==
=== Club ===
As of 6 August 2024.

Club	Season	League			National Cup		League Cup		Other		Total	
Club	Season	Division	Apps	Goals	Apps	Goals	Apps	Goals	Apps	Goals	Apps	Goals
Reading	2017–18	Women's Super League 1	0	0	0	0	0 (Note: Appearances in the FA Women's League Cup)	0	0	0	0	0
Reading	2018–19	Women's Super League	0	0	0	0	0	0	0	0	0	0
Reading	2019–20	Women's Super League	0	0	0	0	0	0	0	0	0	0
Reading	Total		0	0	0	0	0	0	0	0	0	0
Nottingham Forest	2020–21	FA WNL Northern Premier Division	3	0	0	0	0 (Note: Appearances in the FA Women's National League Plate)	0	0	0	3	0
Nottingham Forest	2021–22	FA WNL Northern Premier Division	14	0	3	1	6	1	0	0	23	2
Nottingham Forest	2022–23	FA WNL Northern Premier Division	17	2	2	0	6 (Note: Appearances in the FA Women's National League Cup)	1	1 (Note: Appearances in the FA Women's National League Championship Play Off Final)	0	26	3
Nottingham Forest	2023–24	FA WNL Northern Premier Division	7	1	4	2	2	0	0	0	13	3
Nottingham Forest	Total		41	3	9	3	14	2	1	0	65	8
Career total			41	3	9	3	14	2	1	0	65	8
