= Lyndsey Harkin =

English footballer (born 1991)

Personal information
- Birth name: Lyndsey Alex Cunningham
- Date of birth: 30 August 1991 (age 35)
- Place of birth: Nottingham, England
- Height: 1.69 m (5 ft 7 in)
- Position: Defender

Team information
- Current team: Stoke City

Youth career
- Sherwood Boys
- Nottingham Forest

Senior career*
Years	Team	Apps	(Gls)
2005–2011	Nottingham Forest		
2010–2015	Doncaster Rovers Belles		
2015–2025	Nottingham Forest		
2025–2026	Wolverhampton Wanderers		
2026–	Stoke City		

International career
- England (under-19)
- * Club domestic league appearances and goals

Lyndsey Alex Harkin (née Cunningham; born 30 August 1991) is a former youth England women's international footballer, who plays as a defender for National League North Premier Division side Stoke City. Harkin has played for Doncaster Rovers Belles of the Women's Super League and for her hometown club Nottingham Forest Women.

== Career ==
Harkin was born in Nottingham and took an interest in football, playing with her brother at Sherwood Boys youth club before joining Nottingham Forest in 2005. She made her debut against Aston Villa at the age of 14. She established herself as a key member of the Forest team and helped them win the 2007–08 FA Women's Premier League Northern Division title unbeaten. In 2010, she joined Doncaster Rovers Belles to play in the newly created Women's Super League until they were controversially demoted in 2013. In 2015, she returned to Nottingham Forest and was made team captain, and she went on to make over 300 appearances in a decade helping them win the FA Women's National League Cup in 2024–25 and gain promotion to the Women's Super League 2. With Forest turning professional following promotion, Harkin opted to remain semi-pro and joined Wolverhampton Wanderers in July 2025. Wolves won the 2025–26 FA Women's National League promotion play-off against Plymouth Argyle to join the WSL2. In July 2026, Harkin signed for Stoke City.
