= Derby County F.C. Women =

Women's football club in Derby, England

Coordinates: 52°55′25.25″N 1°32′23.97″W

Derby County Football Club Women
- Full name: Derby County Football Club Women
- Nicknames: Ewe Rams, Ewes
- Founded: 1989
- Ground: Don Amott Arena Mickleover Derby
- Capacity: 4,000 (400 seated)
- Owner: Derby County Football Club Ltd
- Manager: Sam Griffiths
- League: FA Women's National League North
- 2025–26: FA Women's National League North, 8th of 12
- Website: https://www.dcfcw.co.uk/
Home colours	Away colours	Third colours

Derby County Women are an English women's football club affiliated with Derby County F.C. The first-team currently play in the FA Women's National League North Division.

In 2008–09 the club won promotion to the league from the Midland Combination Women's Football League, after beating Crewe 4–2 at Pride Park. In addition to the first-team, the club runs a reserve team who compete within the national reserve team pyramid, and nine academy teams that compete in the Derbyshire Girls League and the Central Warwickshire Girls League. The club enjoys a strong working relationship with the Derby County Girls Regional Talent Centre, allowing a dedicated player pathway from youth football into the Derby County Women senior squads.

== History ==
The club started out as the idea of Sheila Rollinson and Jess Reid, who at the time were both playing for the Coventry-based women's side Holbrooks Athletic. Rollinson had recently moved to the Derby area and Reid lived in Burton, so they came up with the idea of forming a new more locally based team.

Adverts for players were placed in both the Burton Mail and the Derby Evening Telegraph and at that time more of the replies came from the Burton area, so Burton Wanderers was born. The club's first season was 1978–9 in the Midland League (which later became the West Midlands League) and saw the club playing at Shobnall Fields in Burton, with Phil Rollinson as manager and Bob Reid acting as club secretary. Training sessions were held in Bitham School sports hall.

After one season in the Midland league the club decided to move to the Nottingham League (later the East Midlands League) due to the standard of football being of a higher level. At this time a national women's league was not in place and as such the club regularly played against teams such as Doncaster Belles, which at the time contained most of the England team. Junior leagues were not in place and with girls not being allowed to play in boys’ teams, the side often had 11–13-year-olds playing alongside adults.

With the demise of another local side, Derby Rangers, a number of experienced players joined the club and in 1985 the club secured its first sponsorship deal with the Beacon Hotel. The deal saw the club's name change to Beacon Wanderers. During this period Dave Elks enjoyed a lengthy spell as the club's manager before handing over to Malcolm Aldridge. Gradually the balance of players swung more towards the Derby area and as the club name no longer included Burton, it seemed sensible to move both matches and training sessions to Derby. For a while, Leesbrook school was the venue for both before eventually Derby City Council's Parkers Piece ground became the club's home.

In 1990, John Jarman started the Community Department at Derby County Football Club and in the same year, he held discussion with the management of Beacon Wanderers which eventually led to the formation of Derby County Ladies FC. At that time the club consisted of a single open-age team, however, the association with Derby County quickly saw it extended to a reserve and third team. The first manager of the newly formed DCLFC was Neil Crofts.

== Colours and badge ==
The playing colours of Derby County FC Women are identical to those of parent club Derby County F.C. – The club crest is a mirror of the main club's.

== Stadium ==
The Don Amott Arena, home of Mickleover Sports FC and based at Station Road, Mickleover, Derby, DE3 9FE which has a capacity of 4,000 people.

== Players ==
=== Current squad ===
As of 22 November 2024

Note: Flags indicate national team as defined under FIFA eligibility rules; some limited exceptions apply. Players may hold more than one non-FIFA nationality.

No.	Pos.	Nation	Player
1	GK	ENG	Lucy Jones
2	DF	NIR	Sarah Tweedie
3	DF	ENG	Megan Tinsley
4	MF	ENG	Charlotte Steggles
5	DF	ENG	Sarah Jackson
6	DF	WAL	Ella Hilliard
7	MF	ENG	Emelia Wilson
8	MF	ENG	Emily Joyce
9	FW	ENG	Chene Muir
10	DF	ENG	Hannah Ward (Captain)

No.	Pos.	Nation	Player
11	FW	ENG	Kate Oakley
12	MF	ENG	Camille Jenkins
14	MF	ENG	Becky Hogg
15	MF	ENG	Kira Rai
16	MF	WAL	Bethan McGowan
17	MF	ENG	Helena Meadows
18	MF	ENG	Paris Dalton
19	DF	ENG	Daisy Burt
21	GK	ENG	Sarah Morgan
22	MF	ENG	Lara Miller
23	MF	ENG	Rebecca May
25	MF	ENG	Evie McCaffrey (Dual registration from Manchester City)

== Notable former personnel ==
- Cara Newton (England)
- John Griffiths (England U17 Manager)

== Honours ==
- Derbyshire County FA Women's Senior Cup:
- Winners (6): 2011–2012, 2012–2013, 2013–2014, 2014–15, 2015–2016, 2016–17
- Midland Combination Women's Football League:
- Winners (1): 2008–09
- Midland Combination Women's League Cup:
- Winners (2): 2007–08, 2008–09
- Finalists (1): 2006–07
- Unison East Midlands Women's League:
- Winners (1): 2004–05
- Unison East Midlands Women's League Cup:
- Winners (1): 2004–05
- 2015–16 County Cup Winners
- FA Premier League Club Of The Year 2015–16

== Staff ==
Board of directors

- Chief executive – Duncan Gibb
- Finance director – Stephen Joughin
- Media director – Andy Moore
- Operations director – Dave Marriott
- Academy director – Dave Cholerton
- Commercial director – Chris Partridge
- Club secretary – Sheila Rollinson
- Social director – Alison Cope
- Partner liaison director – Richard Pope

Governance board

- Chair – Nick Britten (head of corporate comms at DCFC)
- Vice-chair – Faye Nixon (head of marketing at DCFC)
- Secretary – Sarah Bailey (corporate solicitor at Geldards)
- Board Member – Stephen Pearce (chief executive at DCFC)
- Board Member – Michael Johnson (club ambassador at DCFC)
- Board Member – Claire Twells (business development partner at Smith Partnership)

Football staff

- 1st team manager – Sam Griffiths
- 1st team coach – Jenny Simpson
- 1st team coach – Kiran Savage
- 1st team coach – Sarah Green
- Goalkeeping coach – Damian Morgan
- Sports therapist – Neil Snelson
- S&C coach – Matt Mayer
- U20 joint manager & lead development coach – Dan Dobrzycki
- U20 joint manager – Franco Buonaguro
