= Rugby Borough W.F.C. =

Rugby Borough Women
- Full name: Rugby Borough Women Football Club
- Founded: 1991 (as Coventry City Ladies)
- Ground: Kilsby Lane, Rugby
- Owner: Angels Group Holdings Ltd
- Chairman: Lewis Taylor
- Manager: Lee Burch
- League: FA Women's National League North
- 2025–26: FA Women's National League North, 3rd of 12
- Website: www.rugbyboroughfc.co.uk
Home colours

Rugby Borough Women Football Club is an English women's football club based in Rugby, Warwickshire. Currently they play in the FA Women's National League North, the third tier of women's domestic football in England.

Originally founded in 2013 as Coventry City Ladies, the club merged with non-League football club Coventry United F.C. to form Coventry United Ladies Football Club in 2015. Prior to the 2022–23 season, the club was renamed Coventry United Women Football Club. In June 2023, following the club's relegation from the Women's Championship, the second tier of women's domestic football in England, Coventry United F.C.'s association with the women's team was terminated and the club relocated from Coventry to Rugby and was given its present name, affiliating with Rugby Borough F.C.

In addition to the first team squad, the club operates a reserve team as well as youth teams at a variety of levels including under-11, under-13, under-15, under-16 and under-18.

== History ==
Coventry United Ladies logo, used prior to the 2022–23 season

Founded in 1991, the club began in the West Midlands Regional League. In 1997, as Coventry City, they were promoted into the FA Women's Premier League Northern Division, where they stayed until relegation in 2002.

In 2002–03 the club developed closer relations with Coventry City F.C. while revamping and expanding the youth centre of excellence. In 2004 the club were promoted back to the FA Women's Premier League Northern Division, but lasted only a season at the higher level.

After three consecutive runners-up finishes, Coventry won the Midland Combination again in 2010 – scoring 66 goals in 22 league games.

The club played at Coventry University Sports and Conference Centre, Westwood Heath and at Coventry Sphinx FC, before moving to the Oval, Bedworth. In August 2014 the club announced a move to the Ricoh Arena in Coventry for the 2014–15 season. Midway through the 2014–15 season, Coventry Ladies were forced out of the Ricoh Arena after the arrival of Wasps RFC to the Ricoh. They found themselves playing at the Bedworth Oval once again.

In July 2015 they merged with Coventry United and moved into the Butts Park Arena, home of Coventry R.F.C. where Coventry United play. April 2019 saw the side win the National League South, the third tier in the women's game, seeing them gain promotion to the FA Women's Championship. There followed two hard-fought seasons in 2019–20 and 2020–21 where the club established themselves in the FA Women's Championship with a 9th and 10th-place finish respectively.

In 2021 Steve Quinlan, Paul Marsh and Darren Langdon bought a 49% stake in the club. The club announced plans to turn professional and are beginning their first season as a fully professional club in 2021–22. The club announced plans to liquidate on 23 December 2021 however the club never entered into liquidation. The club's last fixture before the announcement on 23 December 2021 was a 1–0 home victory over fellow FA Women's Championship side, Watford. With a formal deadline set for 4 January 2022, investors Angels Group, headed up by CEO Lewis Taylor, made a bid to acquire the club and clear the debts to ensure the club could complete the season. The offer was accepted and the club was rescued although the FA handed down a 10 points deduction for triggering an insolvency event although the club did not officially enter liquidation. Coventry United Women appealed the decision on various grounds, however the appeal was unsuccessful. With few games to play in the Women's Championship, the points deduction was the equivalent of a 21 points deduction in the Men's Champions due to the available points difference.

In February 2022 Jay Bradford managed her 150th game as manager of Coventry United.

United managed to stay up in the FA Women's Championship, despite the 10 point deduction, thanks to a Mollie Green free kick in the 97th minute to beat and relegate Watford.

At the end of the 2021–22 season, Head Coach Jo Potter, left her role followed by Manager, Jay Bradford. On 1 July, Assistant Manager, Kate Rowson also left her post. During the closed season, Coventry United Women FC announced plans to run a hybrid model, supporting both part time and full time players in a bid to stabilise the club's finances and focus on off-field structure. With the Russian invasion of Ukraine ongoing, this affected the club owners ability to invest larger sums. Coupled with increasing costs within the club, it was decided to run a hybrid model for 12 months whist rebuilding and becoming a sustainable club. Plans are to return to a full time professional model by the 2023–24 season.

The club updated its name from Coventry United Ladies to Coventry United Women, ahead of the 2022–23 season.

In July 2022, the club announced a triple appointment in Jack Heaselden, General Manager, Lee Burch, Head Coach and Sian Osmond, Assistant Manager. These key appointments helped to lay the foundations behind the club's 'project rebirth', designed to professionalise the club from within.

In June 2023, the club relocated 15 miles from Coventry to Rugby and was renamed Rugby Borough FC.

== Players ==
=== Current squad ===
As of 22 November 2024

Note: Flags indicate national team as defined under FIFA eligibility rules; some limited exceptions apply. Players may hold more than one non-FIFA nationality.

No.	Pos.	Nation	Player
2	DF	ENG	Alanah Mann
3	DF	ENG	Saskia Morris
4	MF	ENG	Alanta Brown
8	FW	ENG	Mai Moncaster
9	FW	ENG	Lily Greenslade
10	MF	ENG	Ebony Wiseman
11	FW	ENG	Jessica Camwell
13	GK	ENG	Evie Brown
14	FW	ENG	Nicky Potts

No.	Pos.	Nation	Player
16	FW	ENG	Tate Bullen
18	MF	BEL	Malikia Apindia
21	MF	ENG	Katy Morris
23	DF	ENG	Eve Clarkson
27	FW	ENG	Yasmin Mosby
28	DF	ENG	Sham Ogunbameru
31	DF	WAL	Bethan Roberts
44	GK	ENG	Millie Crook

=== Former players ===
For details of former players, see Category:Coventry United W.F.C. players.

== Honours ==
- Midland Combination Women's Football League:
  - Winners (2): 2003–04, 2009–10
- FA Women's Premier League Northern Division:
  - Runners-Up (promoted to National Division): 2010–11
- FA Women's Premier League Southern Division:
  - Winners : 2013–14
  - Winners : 2018–19
- Birmingham County FA Women's Champions Cup:
  - Winners (3): 2011–12, 2012–13, 2013–14, 2023–24
