= 2014–15 FA Women's Premier League Cup =

Tournament details
- Country: England

Final positions
- Champions: Charlton Athletic
- Runners-up: Sheffield

The 2015–16 FA Women's Premier League Cup is the 24th edition of the FA Women's Premier League Cup, the cup tournament for teams both levels of the Women's Premier League, the National Division and the Northern and Southern Divisions. Charlton Athletic won the cup after defeating reigning champions Sheffield 4–2 on penalties are drawing 0–0 in the final.

== Results ==
All results listed are published by The Football Association.

=== Qualifying round ===
==== Determining round ====
31 August 2014	Ipswich Town (SE1)	5–0	Exeter City (SW1)
10:30	Bitten; Crump; Diston; Smith; Hall	Report

31 August 2014	Loughborough Foxes (M1)	0–4	Leicester City (M1)
13:00		Report	Worts

31 August 2014	Bradford City (N)	2–1	Solihull (M1)
14:00	Rankin 48'; Witham 79'	Report	Kingston

31 August 2014	Brighton & Hove Albion (S)	H–W	Norwich City (SE1)
14:00		Report

31 August 2014	Cambridge United (SE1)	3–1	Cheltenham Town (SW1)
14:00	Wayne 41'; Bright 49'; Hewitt 54'	Report	Hewlett 4'

31 August 2014	Charlton Athletic (S)	5–2	Swindon Town (SW1)
14:00	Graham 21', 84', 90'; Shepherd 53', 71'	Report	Thompson; Uzzell

31 August 2014	Chichester City (SW1)	1–1 (a.e.t.) (2–4 p)	Queens Park Rangers (S)
14:00	Crawley	Report	Adams 15'

31 August 2014	Chorley (N1)	2–3	Sporting Khalsa
14:00	Parry	Report	Poole 60', 75'; Mudge 87'

31 August 2014	Denham United (SE1)	7–1	Gosport Borough
14:00	Allen; Cox; Down; Gilbert	Report	Wilson

31 August 2014	Derby County (N)	1–0	Chester-le-Street Town (N1)
14:00	Johnson 68'	Report

31 August 2014	Forest Green Rovers (SW1)	3–0	Crystal Palace (SE1)
14:00	Marshall; Richardson	Report

31 August 2014	Gillingham (S)	15–0	Ebbsfleet United
14:00	Hincks 10', 20', 39', 49', 57', 69'; Phillips 38', 77', 87'; Keogh 50', 75', 90'; Tune 67', 90+2'	Report

31 August 2014	Guiseley Vixens (N1)	0–9	Cardiff City (S)
14:00		Report	Aldridge 20', 28', 30', 33', 72'; Clipston 36', 42'; Townsend 44'; Green 82'

31 August 2014	Larkhall Athletic (SW1)	H–W	Keynsham Town Development
14:00		Report

31 August 2014	Leicester City Ladies (M1)	0–1 (a.e.t.)	Nottingham Forest (N)
14:00		Report	Kennaugh 112'

31 August 2014	Liverpool Marshall Feds (N1)	1–7	Coventry City (N)
14:00	Evans 55'	Report	Lowder 6', 33', 44', 89'; Clough 20'; Dermody 52'; Gauntlett 72'

31 August 2014	Luton Town (SE1)	1–1 (a.e.t.) (3–2 p)	Milton Keynes Dons (SE1)
14:00	McKay	Report	Goal

31 August 2014	Middlesbrough (N1)	2–3	Mansfield Town (M1)
14:00	Anderson; Scarr	Report	Douglas; Pridden

31 August 2014	Mossley Hill Athletic (N1)	2–1	Preston North End (N)
14:00	Lee 28'; James 84'	Report	Parker 38'

31 August 2014	Newcastle United (N)	3–1	Huddersfield Town (N)
14:00	Crooks; Gardner; Turnbull	Report	Lockwood 90'

31 August 2014	Norton & Stockton Ancients (N1)	4–1	Leafield Athletic (M1)
14:00	Portas; Thorns	Report	Alaka

31 August 2014	Copsewood Coventry (S)	2–4	Portsmouth (S)
14:00	Foskett	Report	Clark; Kempson; Quinn

31 August 2014	Plymouth Argyle (S)	2–1	Bedford (SE1)
14:00	Atkins 73'; Volpini 89'	Report	Fensome 1'

31 August 2014	Rotherham United (M1)	1–5	Sheffield (N1)
14:00	Pollock 80'	Report	Gilliatt 29'; Davies 42'; Michalska 62', 90'; Goodman 85'

31 August 2014	Shanklin (SW1)	0–4	C&K Basildon (SE1)
14:00		Report	Doo; Rushen; Sinclair

31 August 2014	Southampton Saints (SW1)	1–5	Lewes (S)
14:00	Whyte 48'	Report	Spice 9', 33', 70', 80'; Bennett 85'

31 August 2014	St Nicholas (SW1)	0–6	Cardiff City (S)
14:00		Report	Townsend 29'; Isaac 40'; Williams 60'; Atkins 66'; Aldridge 85', 90'

31 August 2014	Steel City Wanderers (M1)	4–1	Curzon Ashton (M1)
14:00	Gingell 27'; Mawhood 42', 74', 81'	Report	Bennett

31 August 2014	Stoke City (N)	0–4	Blackburn Rovers (N1)
14:00		Report	Taylor 6'; Anderton 16'; Jones 65'

31 August 2014	Tottenham Hotspur (S)	7–0	Enfield Town (SE1)
14:00	Bergin; Leon; Martin; Baptiste	Report

31 August 2014	Tranmere Rovers (N1)	3–2	Leeds United (N1)
14:00	Smith 45+1'; Price 58'; Smith 67'	Report	Campbell 41'; Ross 73'

31 August 2014	Wolverhampton Wanderers (N)	2–1 (a.e.t.)	Radcliffe Olympic (M1)
14:00	Hinton 80'	Report	Saulter 52'

31 August 2014	Keynsham Town (S)	3–1	West Ham United (S)
14:30	García 57'; Somaschini 69'; Lorton 78'	Report	Sherwood 28'

31 August 2014	Sporting Club Albion (N)	7–0	Loughborough Students (M1)
14:30	Allen; Griffiths; Holmes; Parnell	Report

7 September 2014	Stockport County (N)	2–3	Morecambe (N1)
14:00	Jones; Webb	Report	Goal

==== Preliminary round ====
14 September 2014	Cambridge United (SE1)	1–4	Queens Park Rangers (SE1)
	Goodchild 61'	Report	Maggs 8'; Sowden 44', 80'; Cheadle 90'

14 September 2014	Denham United (SE1)	0–3	Charlton Athletic (S)
		Report	Howlett 4', 18', 22'

14 September 2014	Tottenham Hotspur (S)	1–0	Tranmere Rovers (N)
	Leary	Report

=== Competition proper ===
==== First round ====
12 October 2014	Derby County (N)	0–4	Brighton & Hove Albion (S)
		Report	Goal

12 October 2014	Forest Green Rovers (SW1)	0–7	Blackburn Rovers (N)
		Report	Shepherd 4'; Sheen 15', 37'; Fleming 24'; Anderton 55'; Holbrook 70'; Chandarana 88'

12 October 2014	Gillingham (S)	0–2	Coventry City (N)
		Report	Lowder 13'; Gauntlett 72'

12 October 2014	Guiseley Vixens (N1)	0–9	Cardiff City (S)
		Report	Aldridge 20', 28', 30', 33', 72'; Clipston 36', 42'; Townsend 44'; Green 82'

12 October 2014	Keynsham Town (SW1)	H–W	Steel City Wanderers (M1)
		Report

12 October 2014	Lewes (S)	3–0	Sporting Khalsa (M1)
	Goddard 24'; Spice 58'; Bennett 77'	Report

12 October 2014	Mansfield Town (M1)	2–3	Ipswich Town (SE1)
	Webster 66'; Bridge 75'	Report	Keevil; Rossiter; Hall

12 October 2014	Mossley Hill Athletic (N1)	3–2 (a.e.t.)	Wolverhampton Wanderers (N)
	Lee 77'; McDonald 101'; Perry 112'	Report	Selmes 22'; Timmins-Ray 92'

12 October 2014	Newcastle United (N)	2–1	Morecambe (N1)
	Foster; McLaughlin	Report	Lupton 63'

12 October 2014	Norton & Stockton Ancients (N1)	0–7	Charlton Athletic (S)
		Report	Graham 13', 87'; Pittuck 14', 25', 37'; Harrison 35'; Cole 62'	Attendance: 23

12 October 2014	Nottingham Forest (N)	3–1	Leicester City (M1)
	Meade 64', 74'; Bell 81'	Report	Axten 74'

12 October 2014	Plymouth Argyle (S)	5–0	Luton Town (SE1)
	Middleton 5', 25'; Javan 35'; Taylor 53'; Pope 80'	Report		Attendance: 30

12 October 2014	Portsmouth (S)	7–1	Larkhall Athletic (SW1)
	Wilson 12'; Clark 45+1'; Sievwright 48', 74'; Umotong 52', 65', 90'	Report	Harrington 20'

12 October 2014	Queens Park Rangers (S)	1–1 (8–9 p)	C&K Basildon (SE1)
	Petit 62'	Report	Rushen 59'

12 October 2014	Sheffield (N)	1–0	Tottenham Hotspur (S)
	Goodman 40'	Report

12 October 2014	Sporting Club Albion (N)	1–0	Bradford City (N)
	Griffiths 15'	Report		Attendance: 31

==== Second round ====
30 November 2014	C&K Basildon (SE1)	2–0	Sporting Club Albion (S)
	Rushen; Sinclair	Report

30 November 2014	Ipswich Town (SE1)	0–9	Cardiff City (S)
		Report	Aldridge 17', 50', 55'; Williams 19'; Wiltshire 25', 75'; Isaac 60', 75'; Clipston 80'

30 November 2014	Keynsham Town (S)	1–2	Nottingham Forest (N)
	Goal	Report	Sullivan 58'; Foster 64'

30 November 2014	Lewes (S)	3–6	Coventry City (N)
	Newton; O'Hagan	Report	Lynch 6'; Toussaint 33', 46'; Gauntlett 55'; Hughes 66'; Formaston 83'

30 November 2014	Newcastle United (N)	0–1 (a.e.t.)	Brighton & Hove Albion (S)
		Report	Gurr

30 November 2014	Portsmouth (S)	6–1	Mossley Hill Athletic (N1)
	Kempson 30'; Quinn 45', 72'; Umotong 70'; Sievwright 80'; Dark 83'	Report	Perry 90+2'

30 November 2014	Sheffield (N)	4–0	Blackburn Rovers (N)
	Michlska 4', 76'; Ward 36'; Davies 69'	Report

30 November 2014	Plymouth Argyle (S)	1–7	Charlton Athletic (S)
	Middleton 65'	Report	Simmons 22'; Clifford 26', 50', 54'; Graham 45', 86'; Simmons 72'

==== Quarter-finals ====
8 February 2015	Nottingham Forest (N)	2–3	Portsmouth (S)
	Bell 22', 47'	Report	Rutherford 25'; Kempson 35'; Umotong 65'

22 February 2015	Sheffield (N)	5–0	C&K Basildon (SE1)
	McIver 14', 29', 43'; Davies 20'; Giampalma 40'	Report

1 March 2015	Brighton & Hove Albion (S)	0–2	Charlton Athletic (S)
		Report	Graham 47'; Paye 59'

1 March 2015	Cardiff City (S)	4–3 (a.e.t.)	Coventry City (N)	Keynsham
	Isaac 60'; Clipston 82'; Britton 114'	Report	Hughes 26', 31'; Dermody 72'	Stadium: Crown Field

==== Semi-Finals ====
The first Semi Final pitted the eventual Northern and Southern Division Champions, Sheffield and Portsmouth, together. Sheffield won, thanks to second half goals from Jodie Michalska and Emma Johnson. Charlton Athletic made history when their Semi Final against Cardiff City was played at The Valley, the first time they had done so for 11 years. Kim Dixson and Kit Graham were both on the scoresheet as they too progressed to the Final.

1 March 2015	Portsmouth (S)	0–2	Sheffield (N)
		Report	Michalska 56'; Johnson 84'

15 March 2015	Charlton Athletic (S)	2–0	Cardiff City (S)	Charlton
	Dixson 66'; Graham 80'	Report		Stadium: The Valley

==== Final ====
3 May 2015
15:00

Charlton Athletic	0–0	Sheffield
	Report
Penalties
Shepherd (penalty scored); Lynch (penalty missed); Pittuck (penalty scored)	4–2	(penalty missed) Johnson; (penalty missed) Murphy; (penalty scored) Goodman

Liberty Way, Nuneaton
