= 2015–16 FA Women's Premier League Cup =

Tournament details
- Country: England
- Teams: 72

Final positions
- Champions: Tottenham Hotspur
- Runners-up: Cardiff City

Tournament statistics
- Matches played: 67
- Goals scored: 328 (4.9 per match)

The 2015–16 FA Women's Premier League Cup is the 25th running of the FA Women's Premier League Cup, which began in 1991. It is the major League Cup competition run by the FA Women's Premier League, and for the second season it is being run alongside their secondary League Cup competition, the Premier League Plate.

All 72 Premier League clubs entered at the Determining round, with the winners continuing in the competition and the losers going into the Premier League Plate tournament.

Going into the tournament, Charlton Athletic were the reigning champions, having defeated Sheffield on penalties the previous season. They failed to defend their title this year however, thanks to a defeat to Cardiff City in the first round.

== Results ==
All results listed are published by The Football Association. Games are listed by round in chronological order, and then in alphabetical order of the home team where matches were played simultaneously.

The division each team play in is indicated in brackets after their name: (S)=Southern Division; (N)=Northern Division; (SW1)=South West Division One; (SE1)=South East Division One; (M1)=Midlands Division One; (N1)=Northern Division One.

=== Determining round ===
The competition began with a Determining Round, which consisted of all 72 teams in the FA Women's Premier League being drawn in pairs. The winners of these 36 games progressed to the next stage of the competition, while the losers qualified for the 2015–16 FA Women's Premier League Plate.

30 August 2015	Brighton & Hove Albion (S)	4–0	Gillingham (SE1)	Lancing
14:00	Barton; Gurr; Natkiel; Stenning	Report		Stadium: Culver Road

30 August 2015	Cambridge United (SE1)	3–0	Cheltenham Town (SW1)	Ely
14:00	Bright; Mills; Taylor	Report		Stadium: Unwin Sports Ground

30 August 2015	Cardiff City (S)	1–0	Enfield Town (SE1)	Ystrad Mynach
14:00	Lloyd 65'	Report		Stadium: CCB Centre for Sporting Excellence

30 August 2015	Chester-le-Street (N1)	1–3	Sporting Club Albion (N)	Chester Moor
14:00	Mellor	Report	Cottam; Dugmore; Greaves	Stadium: Moor Park

30 August 2015	Chorley (N1)	1–4	Radcliffe Olympic (M1)	Leyland
14:00	Berry	Report	Saulter 67', 82', 83'; Evans 89'	Stadium: Jim Fowler Memorial Fields

30 August 2015	Coventry United (S)	0–1	C&K Basildon (S)	Bedworth
14:00		Report	Rodney	Stadium: The Oval Ground

30 August 2015	Forest Green Rovers (S)	5–1	Maidenhead United (SW1)	Cambridge
14:00	Hitchcox 18'; Richardson 50'; King 54', 63', 71'	Report	Goal	Stadium: Wisloe Road

30 August 2015	Guiseley Vixens (N)	1–0 (a.e.t.)	Liverpool Marshall Feds (N1)	Guiseley
14:00	Beresford 115'	Report		Stadium: Nethermoor Park

30 August 2015	Huddersfield Town (N)	10–1	[Blackpool Wren Rovers (N1)	Kirkburton
14:00	Hastings 20', 33', 67'; Heckler 24', 38', 44', 45+1'; Lockwood 41', 75'; Barnes 89'	Report	Watson 89'	Stadium: Storthes Hall Park

30 August 2015	Ipswich Town (SE1)	3–2 (a.e.t.)	Norwich City (SE1)	Rushmere
14:00	Harrison; Fagg; Wiseman 108' (o.g.)	Report	Snelling 84'; Allsopp 87'	Stadium: Humber Doucy Lane

30 August 2015	Keynsham Town (SW1)	2–3	Portsmouth (S)	Keynsham
14:00	Lorton 40'; Villalba 70'	Report	Frampton 24'; Wilson 32'; Simmonds 74'	Stadium: Crown Field

30 August 2015	Larkhall Athletic (SW1)	6–1	Exeter City (SW1)	Larkhall
14:00	German 4', 9', 85'; Harrington 31', 41'; Barratt 50'	Report	Kukor 65'	Stadium: Plain Ham

30 August 2015	Leafield Athletic (M1)	0–8	Nottingham Forest (N)	Birmingham
14:00		Report	McKechnie 14', 29', 85'; Bell 24'; Meade 24', 42', 78'; Ellis 65'	Stadium: Triplex Sports Association

30 August 2015	Loughborough Foxes (N)	0–6	Blackburn Rovers (N)	Loughborough
14:00		Report	Johnson 7', 35'; Jones 30', 52'; Holbrook 78'; Shepherd 89'	Stadium: Loughborough University Stadium

30 August 2015	Loughborough Students (M1)	1–3	Norton & Stockton Ancients (N1)	Loughborough
14:00	Russell 8'	Report	McSorley; Bates	Stadium: Holywell Park

30 August 2015	Lowestoft Town (SE1)	3–2 (a.e.t.)	Luton Town (SE1)	Lowestoft
14:00	Durrant; Walters	Report	Fensome; Jiminez	Stadium: Crown Meadow

30 August 2015	Middlesbrough (N1)	5–2	Leeds Ladies (N1)	Thornaby-on-Tees
14:00	Owens 30', 37', 43'; Foster 67'; Thorns 82'	Report	Hannon 3'; Morris 14'	Stadium: Teesdale Park

30 August 2015	Milton Keynes Dons (SE1)	3–4	Queens Park Rangers (S)	Newport Pagnell
14:00	Cudone	Report	Albert 15', 42'; Wilson 32'; Clarke 74'	Stadium: Willen Road

30 August 2015	Morecambe (N1)	9–0	Leicester City Ladies (M1)	Lancaster
14:00	Hutton 2'; Whittingham 21'; Paling 45'; Keane (pen.); Callis; Norris	Report		Stadium: Lancaster & Morecambe College

30 August 2015	Mossley Hill (N1)	4–2	Steel City Wanderers (M1)	Ormskirk
14:00	Oatley 25', 40'; Brodie 33'; Lee 59'	Report	Wagstaff 84'	Stadium: Edge Hill University

30 August 2015	Newcastle United (N)	1–2	Bradford City (N)	Newcastle upon Tyne
14:00	Gardener 81'	Report	Nutter 25'; Danby 74'	Stadium: Sport Northumbria

30 August 2015	Nuneaton Town (N)	6–1	Stockport County (N1)	Nuneaton
14:00	Williamson; Foskett; Morrish; Clough; McGuckin; (o.g.)	Report	Troiano	Stadium: Liberty Way

30 August 2015	Old Actonians (SE1)	3–3 (a.e.t.) (4–2 p)	Denham United (SE1)	Greenford, London
14:00	Byrne; Friel; Williams	Report	Cox; Down; Nash	Stadium: Berkeley Fields

30 August 2015	Peterborough Northern Star (M1)	0–5	Derby County (N)	Peterborough
14:00		Report	Perry 14'; Lowder 25', 73'; Johnson 45+2'; Jeffery 47'	Stadium: Mick George Arena

30 August 2015	Plymouth Argyle (S)	7–2	St Nicholas (SW1)	Plymouth
14:00	Dorey 3', 53', 69'; Hilleson-Perrett 13', 30'; Brown 55'; Wells 86'	Report	Jefferies 49', 85'	Stadium: Haye Road

30 August 2015	Rotherham United (M1)	0–5	Leicester City (M1)	Rotherham
14:00		Report	Impey 29'; Knight 41'; Ward 64'; Robinson 72'; Worts 78'	Stadium: Roundwood Sports Complex

30 August 2015	Shanklin (SW1)	2–1	Bedford (SE1)	Shanklin
14:00	Cooper 28'; Arnold 36'	Report	Henman 65'	Stadium: County Ground

30 August 2015	Solihull (M1)	0–4	Preston North End (N)	Solihull
14:00		Report	Ball 8'; Walker 39'; Forster 73'; Turner 79'	Stadium: Field Lane

30 August 2015	Southampton Saints (SW1)	0–1	Chichester City (SW1)	Sholing
14:00		Report	Waine	Stadium: Ten Acres

30 August 2015	Stoke City (N)	5–0	Birmingham & West Midlands (M1)	Stone
14:00	Hunt 11', 43'; Asher 24', 34', 44'	Report		Stadium: Wellbeing Park

30 August 2015	Tottenham Hotspur (S)	5–1	Lewes (S)	Cheshunt
14:00	Bergin; O'Leary; Schillaci; Soobadoo	Report	Walder 24'	Stadium: Cheshunt Stadium

30 August 2015	Tranmere Rovers (N1)	0–1	Sporting Khalsa (M1)	Wallasey
14:00		Report	Slade 35'	Stadium: Ray Parker Stadium

30 August 2015	West Ham United (S)	3–0	Crystal Palace (SE1)	Upminster, London
14:00	Edwards 15'; Little 30'; Revell 78'	Report		Stadium: Hornchurch Stadium

Walkover	Charlton Athletic (S)	H–W	Gloucester City (SW1)
		Report

Walkover	Hull City (N1)	H–W	Wolverhampton Wanderers (M1)
		Report

Walkover	Swindon Spitfires (SW1)	A–W	Swindon Town (SW1)
		Report

=== Preliminary round ===
With 36 teams progressing from the determining round, four needed to be eliminated to allow a single-elimination knockout tournament to take place.

Twenty eight of the winners from the determining round were given byes to the first round, with eight teams being drawn against each other in preliminary round ties.

27 September 2015	Cambridge United (SE1)	6–2	Lowestoft Town (SE1)	Ely
14:00	Bright; Jenkins; Taylor	Report	Clarke; Hoffman	Stadium: Unwin Sports Ground

27 September 2015	Norton & Stockton Ancients (N1)	0–17	Bradford City (N)	Norton
14:00		Report	Thackray 9', 36'; McDonnell 15', 84'; McIver 17', 29', 40', 44'; Campbell 26', 72', 83'; O'Hara 35', 58'; Witham 63'; Stuart 69'; 78' (o.g.); Lee 86'	Stadium: Norton Sports Complex

27 September 2015	Portsmouth (S)	1–3 (a.e.t.)	Brighton & Hove Albion (S)	Gosport
14:00	Umotong 24'	Report	Natkiel 56'; Gurr 95', 105'	Stadium: Privett Park

Walkover	Blackburn Rovers (N)	H–W	Radcliffe Olympic (M1)
		Report

=== First round ===
4 October 2015	Blackburn Rovers (N)	4–2 (a.e.t.)	Huddersfield Town (N)	Darwen
14:00	Carter 38' (o.g.); Jennings 77' (o.g.); Jones 98', 107'	Report	Webb 16'; Heckler 57'	Stadium: Anchor Ground

4 October 2015	Bradford City (N)	4–0	Leicester City (M1)	Bradford
14:00	Campbell 61'; McIver 72'; O'Hara 87'; Crosby 90+5'	Report		Stadium: Plumpton Park

4 October 2015	C&K Basildon (S)	1–0	West Ham United (S)	Canvey Island
14:00	Doyle 62'	Report		Stadium: The Prospects Stadium

4 October 2015	Cambridge United (SE1)	0–4	Chichester City (SW1)	Ely
14:00		Report	21' (o.g.); Albuery 32'; Dowdell 49'; Widdows 85'	Stadium: Unwin Sports Ground

4 October 2015	Cardiff City (S)	3–0	Charlton Athletic (S)	Ystrad Mynach
14:00	Price 6'; Green 18'; Aldridge 38'	Report		Stadium: CCB Centre for Sporting Excellence

4 October 2015	Derby County (N)	3–1	Middlesbrough (N1)	Derby
14:00	Perry 10'; Johnson 16', 30'	Report	Goal	Stadium: Anderson Electrical Arena

4 October 2015	Hull City (N1)	2–1	Preston North End (N)	Hull
14:00	Beech; McNamara	Report	Ball	Stadium: Haworth Park

4 October 2015	Ipswich Town (SE1)	1–4	Forest Green Rovers (S)	Rushmere
14:00	Crump	Report	Richardson 27', 77'; Baker 53'; King 60'	Stadium: Humber Doucy Lane

4 October 2015	Mossley Hill (N1)	1–0	Guiseley Vixens (N)	Liverpool
14:00	Oatley 67'	Report		Stadium: Mossley Hill Athletic Club

4 October 2015	Nottingham Forest (N)	4–1	Nuneaton Town (N)	Nottingham
14:00	Bell 72', 90+5'; Robb 81'; McKechnie 90+2'	Report	Rowles 85'	Stadium: Greenwich Avenue

4 October 2015	Old Actonians (SE1)	3–0	Shanklin (SW1)	Greenford, London
14:00	Byrne; Murphy	Report		Stadium: Berkeley Fields

4 October 2015	Queens Park Rangers (S)	1–7	Brighton & Hove Albion (S)	West Drayton, London
14:00	Maggs 27'	Report	Taylor 14', 42', 82'; Gurr 15'; Natkiel 50'; Russell 52'; Cooper 88'	Stadium: Honeycroft

4 October 2015	Sporting Club Albion (N)	4–0	Sporting Khalsa (M1)	Halesowen
14:00	Dugmore; Poole; Haynes	Report		Stadium: The Grove

4 October 2015	Stoke City (N)	6–1	Morecambe (N1)	Stone
14:00	3' (o.g.); Garside 15', 82'; Hunt 31', 90'; Hayes 37'	Report	Norris 52'	Stadium: Wellbeing Park

4 October 2015	Tottenham Hotspur (S)	4–1	Plymouth Argyle (S)	Cheshunt
14:00	Bergin; Moore; Rawle; Vio	Report	Lane 90+2'	Stadium: Cheshunt Stadium

4 October 2015	Swindon Town (SW1)	5–0	Larkhall Athletic (SW1)	Shrivenham
15:00	Westlake 20'; Picton 24', 36'; Attenborough 62', 77'	Report		Stadium: Barrington Park

=== Second round ===
29 November 2015	Brighton & Hove Albion (S)	6–0	Chichester City (SW1)	Lancing
14:00	Boswell 17'; Gurr 33', 49'; Natkiel 35', 90+2'; Taylor 70'	Report		Stadium: Culver Road

29 November 2015	C&K Basildon (S)	2–5	Tottenham Hotspur (S)	Canvey Island
14:00	Dunsden 27'; Rodney 79'	Report	O'Leary 9', 27', 57'; Martin 31'; Loomes 87'	Stadium: The Prospects Stadium

29 November 2015	Mossley Hill (N1)	3–4	Blackburn Rovers (N)	Liverpool
14:00	Brodie 41'; Thompson 48'; Perry 75'	Report	Jones 12'; Jordan 27', 33'; Johnson 83'	Stadium: Mossley Hill Athletic Club

6 December 2015	Hull City (N1)	0–3	Nottingham Forest (N)	Pocklington
14:00		Report	Bell 25', 60'; McIntosh 83'	Stadium: Henry Thirsk Amenity Centre

6 December 2015	Stoke City (N)	3–2	Bradford City (N)	Stone
14:00	Lilly 30'; McCoy 70', 90+4'	Report	Ellsworth 4'; Campbell 38'	Stadium: Wellbeing Park

20 December 2015	Old Actonians (SE1)	2–5	Swindon Town (SW1)	Greenford, London
13:00	Cree; Odofin	Report	Westlake 31'; Butterfield 37'; Smith 45'; Maynard 76'; Collings 90'	Stadium: Berkeley Fields

3 January 2016	Derby County (N)	0–3	Sporting Club Albion (N)	Etwall
14:00		Report	Cottam; Dugmore; Poole	Stadium: Etwall Leisure Centre

7 January 2016	Cardiff City (S)	9–0	Forest Green Rovers (S)	Ystrad Mynach
19:45	Bartlett; Britton; Green; Isaac; Price; Suominen; Clipston; Evans	Report		Stadium: CCB Centre for Sporting Excellence

=== Quarter-finals ===
21 February 2016	Blackburn Rovers (N)	4–1	Sporting Club Albion (N)	Old Langho
14:00	Jones 2', 20'; Shepherd 42'; Toone 90+4'	Report	Greaves 40'	Stadium: Blackburn Rovers Senior Training Centre

21 February 2016	Stoke City (N)	2–4	Cardiff City (S)	Stone
14:00	Hunt 3'; Asher 17'	Report	Williams 15', 30'; Bartlett 40'; Hinchcliffe 90'	Stadium: Wellbeing Park

6 March 2016	Nottingham Forest (N)	2–0	Swindon Town (SW1)	Nottingham
14:00	Bell 38'; McKechnie 83'	Report		Stadium: Greenwich Avenue

6 March 2016	Tottenham Hotspur (S)	1–0	Brighton & Hove Albion (S)	Enfield
14:00	Leon 87'	Report		Stadium: Brimsdown Sports & Social Club

=== Semi-finals ===
20 March 2016	Nottingham Forest (N)	0–1	Tottenham Hotspur (S)	Nottingham
13:30		Report	Bergin 72'	Stadium: Greenwich Avenue

27 March 2016	Cardiff City (S)	3–0	Blackburn Rovers (N)	Ystrad Mynach
14:00	Bartlett 34'; Bickett 40' (o.g.); Suominen 57'	Report		Stadium: CCB Centre for Sporting Excellence

=== Final ===
8 May 2016
14:00

Cardiff City (S)	1–2 (a.e.t.)	Tottenham Hotspur (S)
Suominen 44'	Report	Baptiste 30'; Vio 120'

Aggborough, Kidderminster
Attendance: 446
Referee: Darren McMillain

Cardiff City	Tottenham Hotspur

1	Alesha McGlynn
2	Hannah Mills
5	Gemma Evans
4	Abbie Britton (capt.)
3	Kelly Aldridge
6	Michelle Green	(substituted off) 63'
7	Kelly Isaac	(substituted off) 99'
8	Alys Hinchcliffe	(substituted off) 104'
9	Kelly Bartlett
10	Hope Suominen
11	Laura Williams
Substitutes:
12	Cori Williams	(substituted on) 99'
14	Chloe Lloyd	(substituted on) 63'
15	Ffion Price
16	Amy Wathan
17	Beth Lloyd	(substituted on) 104'
Manager:
Gary Green

1	Toni-Anne Wayne
6	Alex Keown
11	Jenna Schillaci (capt.)
3	Leah Rawle	(substituted off) 76'
15	Josie Green
16	Maya Vio
12	Rianna Soobadoo
14	Katherine O'Leary	(substituted off) 72'
8	Bianca Baptiste	(substituted off) 99'
5	Sophie McClean
10	Wendy Martin
Substitutes:
7	Avilla Bergin	(substituted on) 72'
24	Ronnell Humes	(substituted on) 99'
4	Shannon Moloney
22	Kelley Blanchflower
17	Rosie Kmita	(substituted on) 76'
Manager:
Karen Hills

Teams and squad numbers as indicated on the official team sheet for the match.
