= 2013–14 FA Women's Premier League Cup =

Tournament details
- Country: England

Final positions
- Champions: Sheffield
- Runners-up: Cardiff City

The 2013–14 FA Women's Premier League Cup is the 23rd edition of the FA Women's Premier League Cup, the cup tournament for teams both levels of the Women's Premier League, the National Division and the Northern and Southern Divisions. Sheffield won the cup after defeating Cardiff City 2–6 in the final.

== Group stage ==
Six groups of three teams and one group of four were drawn. The teams finishing winners in each group, and runners-up of the group of four, progressed.

=== Group 1 ===
Pos	Team	Pld	W	D	L	GF	GA	GD	Pts	Qualification	PNE	WOW	LEU
1	Preston North End	2	2	0	0	15	2	+13	6	Advanced to Knockout phase	—	4–2	–
2	Wolverhampton Wanderers	2	1	0	1	6	7	−1	3		–	—	4–3
3	Leeds United	2	0	0	2	3	15	−12	0		0–11	–	—

22 September 2013	Wolverhampton Wanderers (N)	4–3	Leeds United (N)
14:00	Palmer 1', 77'; Timmins-Ray 48'; Selmes 90+3'	Report	Huegett 13', 61'; McIver 28'

27 October 2013	Leeds United (N)	0–11	Preston North End (N)
14:00		Report	Grocott 4'; Foster 13', 57'; Watson 43'; Carroll 47'; Jones 50'; Ball 68', 74'; Taberner 76'

10 November 2013	Preston North End (N)	4–2	Wolverhampton Wanderers (N)
14:00	Jones 26'; Forster 28'; Grocott 57'; Savage 70'	Report	Luke 20'; Selmes 50'

=== Group 2 ===
Pos	Team	Pld	W	D	L	GF	GA	GD	Pts	Qualification	CAC	KYT	WHU
1	Cardiff City	2	2	0	0	9	3	+6	6	Advanced to Knockout phase	—	–	5–3
2	Keynsham Town	2	1	0	1	3	6	−3	3		0–4	—	–
3	West Ham United	2	0	0	2	5	8	−3	0		–	2–3	—

22 September 2013	West Ham United (S)	2–3	Keynsham Town (S)
14:00	Mellors	Report	Valdivia 6'; Lapham 23'; Rusek 64'

10 November 2013	Cardiff City (S)	5–3	West Ham United (S)
14:00	Townsend 3'; Cousins 60', 86'; Lawrence 70', 88'	Report	Albert 17', 29'; Blanchflower 88'

8 December 2013	Keynsham Town (S)	0–4	Cardiff City (S)
14:00		Report	Wiltshire 4', 55', 60'; Clipston 10'

=== Group 3 ===
Pos	Team	Pld	W	D	L	GF	GA	GD	Pts	Qualification	SHE	BLR	SCA
1	Sheffield	2	2	0	0	7	1	+6	6	Advanced to Knockout phase	—	–	2–0
2	Blackburn Rovers	2	1	0	1	4	6	−2	3		1–5	—	–
3	Sporting Club Albion	2	0	0	2	1	5	−4	0		–	1–3	—

22 September 2013	Sheffield (S)	2–0	Sporting Club Albion (S)
14:00	Giampalma 22'; Davies 46'	Report

10 November 2013	Blackburn Rovers (S)	1–5	Sheffield (S)
14:00	Hardy 10'	Report	Giampalma 12', 16'; Johnston 42'; Gilliatt 90'

8 December 2013	Sporting Club Albion (S)	1–3	Blackburn Rovers (S)
14:00	Connor-Iommi	Report	Forster 28', 83'; Hardy 65'

=== Group 4 ===
Pos	Team	Pld	W	D	L	GF	GA	GD	Pts	Qualification	LEW	POR	CHA
1	Lewes	2	2	0	0	2	0	+2	6	Advanced to Knockout phase	—	–	1–0
2	Portsmouth	2	0	1	1	1	2	−1	1		0–1	—	–
3	Charlton Athletic	2	0	1	1	1	2	−1	1		–	1–1	—

22 September 2013	Portsmouth (S)	0–1	Lewes (S)
14:00		Report	Spice

17 November 2013	Lewes (S)	1–0	Charlton Athletic (S)
14:00	O'Hagan 85'	Report

8 December 2013	Charlton Athletic (S)	1–1	Portsmouth (S)
14:00	Pittuck 10'	Report	Wilson 38'

=== Group 5 ===
Pos	Team	Pld	W	D	L	GF	GA	GD	Pts	Qualification	BRC	NEU	STC
1	Bradford City	2	1	1	0	5	2	+3	4	Advanced to Knockout phase	—	–	4–1
2	Newcastle United	2	0	2	0	1	1	0	2		1–1	—	–
3	Stoke City	2	0	1	1	1	4	−3	1		–	0–0	—

22 September 2013	Newcastle United (N)	1–1	Bradford City (N)
14:00	Wilson 78'	Report	Danby 21'

10 November 2013	Stoke City (N)	0–0	Newcastle United (N)
14:00	Gallagher; Garside; Tierney	Report

8 December 2013	Bradford City (N)	4–1	Stoke City (N)
14:00	O'Hara 27', 33', 54'; Kendell 43'	Report	Gallagher 11'

=== Group 6 ===
Pos	Team	Pld	W	D	L	GF	GA	GD	Pts	Qualification	GIL	TOH	BHA	CHU
1	Gillingham	3	3	0	0	13	2	+11	9	Advanced to Knockout phase	—	7–2	–	–
2	Tottenham Hotspur	3	2	0	1	11	10	+1	6		–	—	4–2	5–1
3	Brighton & Hove Albion	3	1	0	2	7	11	−4	3		0–3	–	—	5–4
4	Chesham United	3	0	0	3	5	13	−8	0		0–3	–	–	—

22 September 2013	Gillingham (S)	7–2	Tottenham Hotspur (S)
14:00	Blackie; Carlton; Gibbons; Keogh; Phillips; Tune	Report	Lane; Gamble

22 September 2013	Brighton & Hove Albion (S)	5–4	Chesham United (S)
14:00	Natkiel 1'; Barton 19'; Owen 36'; Talbut-Smith 75'	Report	Gallagher 15', 55', 83'; Fraser 75'

27 October 2013	Chesham United (S)	0–3	Gillingham (S)
14:00		Report	Cooper; Tune; Fulgence

10 November 2013	Tottenham Hotspur (S)	5–1	Chesham United (S)
14:00	Cooper; Marconi; Martin; Kmita; Moseley	Report	Fraser 82'

10 November 2013	Brighton & Hove Albion (S)	0–3	Gillingham (S)
14:00		Report	Fulgence; Keogh; Tune

8 December 2013	Tottenham Hotspur (S)	4–2	Brighton & Hove Albion (S)
14:00	Lane; Martin; Wynne	Report	Barton 83'

=== Group 7 ===
Pos	Team	Pld	W	D	L	GF	GA	GD	Pts	Qualification	CVC	NOF	DEC
1	Coventry City	2	1	1	0	4	0	+4	4	Advanced to Knockout phase	—	0–0	
2	Nottingham Forest	2	1	1	0	3	1	+2	4		–	—	3–1
3	Derby County	2	0	0	2	1	7	−6	0		0–4		—

22 September 2013	Coventry City (S)	0–0	Nottingham Forest (N)
14:00		Report

17 November 2013	Nottingham Forest (N)	3–1	Derby County (N)
14:00	Howard 14'; McKechnie 37'; Thompson 78'	Report	Ward

8 December 2013	Derby County (N)	0–4	Coventry City (S)
14:00		Report	Gauntlett 26'; Neville 56'; Anderson 78'; Dermody 87'

== Knockout phase ==
=== Bracket ===
Quarter-finals
Cardiff City	1
Lewes	0
Coventry City	1
Gillingham	0
Preston North End	1
Nottingham Forest	0
Bradford City	1
Sheffield	2

Semi-finals
Cardiff City	1
Coventry City	0
Preston North End	1
Sheffield	4

Final
Cardiff City	2
Sheffield	6

=== Quarter-finals ===
2 February 2014	Cardiff City (S)	1–0	Lewes (S)
14:00	Green 73'	Report

2 March 2014	Coventry City (S)	1–0	Gillingham (S)
14:00	Anderson 58'	Report

9 March 2014	Preston North End (N)	1–0	Nottingham Forest (N)
14:00	Savage 14'	Report

2 February 2014	Bradford City (N)	1–2	Sheffield (N)
14:00	Lee 20'	Report	Goodman 90'; De Silva 90+3'

=== Semi-final ===
30 March 2014	Preston North End (N)	1–4	Sheffield (N)
14:00	Ball 78'	Report	Michalska 8', 19', 64'

30 March 2014	Cardiff City (S)	1–0	Coventry City (S)
14:00	Goal	Report

=== Final ===
4 May 2014
14:30

Cardiff City	2–6	Sheffield
Lloyd 40'; Townsend 83'	Report	Ward 12', 34', 74'; Davies 45'; Michalska 51'; Giampalma 75'

Pirelli Stadium, Burton upon Trent
Attendance: 405
Referee: Sian Piret
