= 2004–05 FA Women's Premier League Cup =

Tournament details
- Country: England
- Dates: 29 August 2004 – 6 March 2005
- Teams: 34

Final positions
- Champions: Arsenal
- Runners-up: Charlton Athletic

The 2004–05 FA Women's Premier League Cup was the 14th edition of the FA Women's Premier League Cup, which began in 1991. It was sponsored by Nationwide and was officially known as the FA Nationwide Women's Premier League Cup. The competition was contested by all 34 teams of the three divisions of the FA Women's Premier League (National Division, Northern Division and Southern Division). Arsenal won their eight title after a 3–0 win over Charlton Athletic in the final.

== Results ==
All results listed are published by The Football Association (FA). The division each team play in is indicated in brackets after their name: (NA)=National Division; (NO)=Northern Division; (S)=Southern Division.

=== Preliminary round ===
Matches were played on 29 August 2004.

29 August 2004	Blackburn Rovers (NO)	3–2	Oldham Curzon (NO)
14:00	Anderton; Bell	Report	Dean; Gaynon

29 August 2004	Tranmere Rovers (NO)	2–0	Southampton Saints (S)
14:00	Goal	Report

=== First round ===
Matches were played on 12 September 2004.

12 September 2004	Wolverhampton Wanderers (NO)	0–5	Bristol Rovers (NA)
14:00		Report	Sh. Williams; Curtis; Trafford; Green

12 September 2004	Tranmere Rovers (NO)	0–2	Millwall Lionesses (S)
14:00		Report	Lennon

12 September 2004	Lincoln City (NO)	0–6	Everton (NA)
14:00		Report	Parry; McDougall; F. Williams; Evans; Handley

12 September 2004	Enfield Town (S)	1–5	Fulham (NA)
14:00	Goal	Report	Anderson; Wilding; Baker; Wright; Phillips

12 September 2004	Portsmouth (S)	2–3	Watford (S)
14:00	Niven	Report	Dowie; Ward

12 September 2004	Middlesbrough (NO)	1–3	Manchester City (NO)	Billingham
14:00	Manning	Report	Dixon; Thomas	Stadium: Bedford Terrace

12 September 2004	Ipswich Town (S)	0–1	Sheffield Wednesday (NO)	Rushmere
14:00		Report	Abrahams	Stadium: Ipswich Town Training Ground

12 September 2004	Coventry City (NO)	1–2	Cardiff City (S)	Coventry
14:00	McLeod	Report	Gaunt; Fishlock	Stadium: Cameron Slater Stadium

12 September 2004	Brighton & Hove Albion (S)	5–1	Langford (S)
14:00	Mead; Perry; Waine	Report	Durrant

12 September 2004	Doncaster Rovers Belles (NA)	1–0	Aston Villa (NO)	Doncaster
14:00	Exley	Report		Stadium: Eco-Power Stadium

12 September 2004	Crystal Palace (S)	1–3	Liverpool (NA)
14:00	Covington	Report	Thomas; Hart; Foster

12 September 2004	Chelsea (S)	1–2 (a.e.t.)	Bristol City (NA)
14:00	De La Salle (pen.)	Report	Barrett; Bevan 115'

12 September 2004	Charlton Athletic (NA)	H–W	Stockport County (NO)
14:00		Report

12 September 2004	Blackburn Rovers (NO)	0–3	Leeds United (NA)
14:00		Report	Walker; Ward; Culvin

12 September 2004	Arsenal (NA)	H–W	Sunderland (NO)	Borehamwood
14:00		Report		Stadium: Meadow Park

12 September 2004	AFC Wimbledon (S)	0–7	Birmingham City (NA)
14:00		Report	Carney; Ballard; Gallagher; Potter; Ward; Scott

=== Second round ===
Matches were played on 10 October 2004.

10 October 2004	Sheffield Wednesday (NO)	0–3	Liverpool (NA)
14:00		Report	Hastie; Thomas

10 October 2004	Brighton & Hove Albion (S)	4–0	Watford (S)
14:00	Dawkins; Mead; Perry; Tregear	Report

10 October 2004	Leeds United (NA)	2–3	Fulham (NA)
14:00	Emmanuel; Walker	Report	Ritchie; Wilding

10 October 2004	Everton (NA)	0–2	Bristol Rovers (NA)
14:00		Report	Curtis; Sh. Williams

10 October 2004	Charlton Athletic (NA)	6–0	Manchester City (NO)
14:00	Broadhurst 38'; Clarke 59'; Hunn 53', 65'; Walker 54', 57'	Report

10 October 2004	Cardiff City (S)	1–5	Doncaster Rovers Belles (NA)
14:00	Fishlock	Report	Copeland; Thomson; Walsh

10 October 2004	Birmingham City (NA)	6–0	Millwall Lionesses (S)
14:00	Bassett; Maggs; Scott; Yankey	Report

10 October 2004	Arsenal (NA)	4–1	Bristol City (NA)	Borehamwood
14:00	Sanderson 7', 80'; Grant 15'; Fleeting 90'	Report	Bryant 30'	Stadium: Meadow Park

=== Quarter-finals ===
Matches were played on 7 November 2004.

7 November 2004	Doncaster Rovers Belles (NA)	1–2	Birmingham City (NA)	Doncaster
14:00	Walsh	Report	Carney; Scott	Stadium: Eco-Power Stadium

7 November 2004	Charlton Athletic (NA)	3–0	Bristol Rovers (NA)
14:00	Si. Williams 1'; Heatherson 71'; Hunn 90'	Report

7 November 2004	Brighton & Hove Albion (S)	2–5	Liverpool (NA)
14:00	Perry; Waine	Report	Hastie; Thomas; Traynor

7 November 2004	Arsenal (NA)	3–0	Fulham (NA)	Borehamwood
14:00	Grant 18'; Ludlow 72'; Sanderson 90'	Report		Stadium: Meadow Park

=== Semi-finals ===
Matches were played on 12 December 2004.

12 December 2004	Liverpool (NA)	0–3	Charlton Athletic (NA)	Liverpool
14:00		Report	Clarke 68'; Heatherson 87'; Stoney 90' (pen.)	Stadium: Wyncote Sports Ground

12 December 2004	Birmingham City (NA)	1–3	Arsenal (NA)	Solihull
14:00	Barr 52'	Report	Fleeting 16', 78', 89'	Stadium: Damson Park

=== Final ===
6 March 2005
14:00

Charlton Athletic	0–3	Arsenal
	Report	Fleeting 24'; White 48', 69'

Griffin Park, Brentford
Attendance: 2,512

== See also ==
- 2004–05 FA Women's Premier League
- 2005 FA Women's Cup Final
