= 2015–16 Brighton & Hove Albion W.F.C. season =

Brighton & Hove Albion
2015–16 season
- Chairman: Tony Bloom
- Manager: James Marrs; 2014–16; George Parris; 2016
- Stadium: Culver Road
- Premier Southern Division: Champions
- FA Cup: Fifth round
- League Cup: Quarter final
Home colours	Away colours

The 2015–16 Brighton & Hove Albion W.F.C season was a successful campaign for the club as they competed in the FA Women's Premier League Southern Division, finishing as league champions and winning the championship play-off final against Northern Division champions Sporting Club Albion.

== Season overview ==
- Finished the league table as champions of the Premier Southern Division
- Won 4–2 in the Championship Play-Off Final at Adams Park to clinch the overall national title and secure promotion to FA WSL 2

=== Managerial dismissals ===
In April 2016, just weeks before the play-off final, manager James Marrs was sacked following an internal investigation regarding a complaint made via the Sussex County FA. Shortly after, the elite women and girls football manager, Tracey Doe, was also dismissed following an internal investigation.

Following the departure of the manager, former Brighton & Hove Albion player George Parris took over as interim manager to guide the team through the end of the season.

== Awards ==
The club were recognised with Club of the Year 2016 at the Football Association women's awards.
