= 2015–16 Middlesbrough F.C. Ladies season =

Middlesbrough
2015–16 season
- Chairman: Steve Gibson
- Manager: Lindsey Stephenson
- Stadium: Teesdale Park
- ND1: 1st (promoted)
- FA Cup: Fourth qualifying round
- WPL Cup: First round
- Top goalscorer: League: Bianca Owens (38); All: Bianca Owens (49)
- Biggest win: 13–0 (vs. Blackpool Wren Rovers, Northern Division One, 20 March 2016)
- Biggest defeat: 5–1 (vs. Liverpool Feds, Northern Division One, 6 September 2015)
Home colours	Away colours

The 2015–16 season was the 40th season of competitive football in the history of Middlesbrough Football Club Ladies, their second consecutive season in the FA Premier League Northern Division One, and fifth consecutive season at the fourth level of English women's football, following the continued development and reorganisation of the women's pyramid. The club also participated in the FA Cup, and the WPL Cup.

Middlesbrough secured promotion and the league title on 10 April 2016, following a 6–0 win against Mossley Hill Athletic.

== Transfers ==
=== In ===
Date	Position	Nationality	Name	From	Ref.
20 November 2015	MF	(England)	Rebekah Bass	(England) Sunderland	

== Competitions ==
=== Northern Division One ===
==== Results summary ====
Overall								Home						Away					
Pld	W	D	L	GF	GA	GD	Pts	W	D	L	GF	GA	GD	W	D	L	GF	GA	GD
22	17	3	2	90	22	+68	54	9	1	1	57	11	+46	8	2	1	33	11	+22

Last updated: 24 April 2016.
Source: FA WNL Northern Division One

==== Results by round ====
Matchday	1	2	3	4	5	6	7	8	9	10	11	12	13	14	15	16	17	18	19	20	21	22
Ground	H	A	A	H	A	H	A	A	H	H	H	A	A	A	A	H	H	H	H	H	A	A
Result	W	W	L	W	W	D	W	W	W	W	L	W	D	D	W	W	W	W	W	W	W	W
Position	2	2	6	4	1	2	1	2	1	1	2	1	1	2	1	1	1	1	1	1	1	1

Source: FA WNL Northern Division One
A = Away; H = Home; W = Win; D = Draw; L = Loss

==== Matches ====
16 August 2015 1	Middlesbrough	5–1	Tranmere Rovers	Thornaby-on-Tees
14:00 BST	Owens 25', 86'; Laverick 31'; Foster 54'; Manning 74'	Report	Horne 76'	Stadium: Teesdale Park

3 September 2015 2	Norton & Stockton Ancients	0–3	Middlesbrough	Stockton
19:45 BST		Report	Kinlan 66', 82'; Owens 72'	Stadium: Norton Sports Complex

6 September 2015 3	Liverpool Feds	5–1	Middlesbrough	Liverpool
14:00 BST	Wensley 22', 44'; Coleman 34'; Apps 61'; Longhurst 78'	Report	Thorns 40'	Stadium: Heron Eccles

13 September 2015 4	Middlesbrough	6–0	Chester-le-Street Town	Thornaby-on-Tees
14:00 BST	Owens 5'; Hanratty 28', 36'; Thorns 55', 60'; Manning 67'	Report		Stadium: Teesdale Park

20 September 2015 5	Blackpool Wren Rovers	0–3	Middlesbrough	Liverpool
14:00 BST		Report	Hanratty 72', 80'; Owens 74'	Stadium: Mossley Hill Athletics Club

23 September 2015 6	Middlesbrough	2–2	Norton & Stockton Ancients	Thornaby-on-Tees
19:45 BST	Hanratty 27'; Thorns 68'	Report		Stadium: Teesdale Park

27 September 2015 7	Stockport County	2–4	Middlesbrough	Stockport
14:00 BST		Report	Owens 25', 73'; Thorns 32'; Helm 55'	Stadium: Stockport Sports Village

25 October 2015 8	Tranmere Rovers	1–2	Middlesbrough	Wallasey
14:00 BST	Cloy 13'	Report	Ridley 15'; Hanratty 37'	Stadium: Villa Park Wallasey

1 November 2015 9	Middlesbrough	6–0	Leeds United	Thornaby-on-Tees
14:00 GMT	Owens 2', 48'; Leigh 4'; Ridley 20', 29'; Bell 82'	Report		Stadium: Teesdale Park

15 November 2015 10	Middlesbrough	10–2	Stockport County	Thornaby-on-Tees
14:00 GMT	Owens 3', 10', 17', 38', 55', 60', 76', 87'; Foster 25'; Leigh 43'	Report	Douglas; Jones	Stadium: Teesdale Park

22 November 2015 11	Middlesbrough	1–2	Mossley Hill Athletic	Thornaby-on-Tees
14:00 GMT	Owens 57'	Report	Brodie 36'; Lee 80'	Stadium: Teesdale Park

6 December 2015 12	Leeds United	1–4	Middlesbrough	Garforth
14:00 GMT	Starkie 70'	Report	Thorns 17'; Owens 50', 61'; Bell 36'	Stadium: Bannister Prentice Community Stadium

10 January 2016 13	Hull City	0–0	Middlesbrough	Hull
14:00 GMT		Report		Stadium: Allam Sports Centre

24 January 2016 14	Chester-le-Street Town	1–1	Middlesbrough	Chester-le-Street
14:00 GMT	Havery 35'	Report	Owens 33'	Stadium: Moor Park

31 January 2016 15	Morecambe	1–4	Middlesbrough	Lancaster
14:00 GMT	Kay 90+2'	Report	Owens 1'; Scarr 20'; Bass 47'; Leigh 55'	Stadium: Lancaster and Morecambe College

7 February 2016 16	Middlesbrough	3–2	Morecambe	Thornaby-on-Tees
14:00 GMT	Bass 32'; Manning 49', 81'	Report	Kay; Williamson	Stadium: Teesdale Park

28 February 2016 17	Middlesbrough	2–0	Liverpool Feds	Thornaby-on-Tees
14:00 GMT	Scarr 56'; Owens 72'	Report		Stadium: Teesdale Park

13 March 2016 18	Middlesbrough	4–1	Hull City	Thornaby-on-Tees
14:00 GMT	Owens 41', 62', 82'; Scarr 65'	Report	Smith	Stadium: Teesdale Park

20 March 2016 19	Middlesbrough	13–0	Blackpool Wren Rovers	Middlesbrough
14:00 GMT	Laverick 2'; Bell 21', 36'; Owens 35', 44', 47', 48', 48'; Scarr 27', 31', 50', 67'; Dobson 80'	Report		Stadium: Middlesbrough College

3 April 2016 20	Middlesbrough	5–1	Chorley	Middlesbrough
14:00 BST	Owens 19'; Havelock 31', 57', 70'; Bell 84'	Report	Wood 68'	Stadium: Middlesbrough College

10 April 2016 21	Mossley Hill Athletic	0–6	Middlesbrough	Liverpool
14:00 BST		Report	Bell 5'; Dobson 9'; Owens 53', 72'; Foster 62'; Hanratty 78'	Stadium: Mossley Hill Athletics Club

24 April 2016 22	Chorley	0–5	Middlesbrough	Euxton
14:00 BST		Report	Owens 10', 16', 30', 41'; Foster 49'	Stadium: Jim Fowlers Memorial Ground

=== FA Cup ===
10 October 2015 Third qualifying round	Middlesbrough	11–0	Lowick United	Thornaby-on-Tees
14:00 BST	Manning 4'; Kinlan 12'; Owens 17', 19', 24', 25', 44', 48', 52', 53'; Davison 62'	Report		Stadium: Teesdale Park

8 November 2015 Fourth qualifying round	Middlesbrough	1–3	Liverpool Feds	Thornaby-on-Tees
13:00 GMT	Thorns 56'	Report	Apps 1'; Douglas 45+1'; Davison 79'	Stadium: Teesdale Park

=== WPL Cup ===
30 August 2015 Determining round	Middlesbrough	5–2	Leeds United	Thornaby-on-Tees
14:00 BST	Owens 30', 37', 43'; Foster 67'; Thorns 82'	Report	Hannon 3'; Morris 14'	Stadium: Teesdale Park

4 October 2015 First round	Derby County	3–1	Middlesbrough	Derby
14:00 BST	Perry 10'; Johnson 16', 30'	Report	Own Goal (o.g.)	Stadium: Anderson Electrical Arena

== Statistics ==
=== Goalscorers ===
As of 24 April 2016.

Rank	Nat.	Po.	Name	ND1	FA Cup	WPL Cup	Total
1	(England)	FW	Bianca Owens	38	8	3	49
2	(England)	MF	Nyci Thorns	6	1	1	8
3	(England)	DF	Rebecca Hanratty	7	0	0	7
3	(England)	MF	Emily Scarr	7	0	0	7
4	(England)	MF	Millie Bell	6	0	0	6
5	(England)	DF	Emma Foster	4	0	1	5
5	(England)	MF	Sarah Manning	4	1	0	5
6	(England)	DF	Jade Ridley	3	0	0	3
6	(England)	MF	Katie Kinlan	2	1	0	3
6	(England)	MF	Samantha Leigh	3	0	0	3
6	(England)	MF	Jessica Havelock	3	0	0	3
7	(England)	DF	Simone Laverick	2	0	0	2
7	(England)	MF	Elle Dobson	2	0	0	2
7	(England)	DF	Rebekah Bass	2	0	0	2
8	(England)	DF	Clare Helm	1	0	0	1
8	(England)	MF	Rebecca Davison	0	1	0	1
Total				90	12	5	107

== Awards ==
=== FA WPL Manager of the Year ===
Manager	Ref.
(England) Lindsey Stephenson	

=== FA WPL Northern Division One Top Goalscorer ===
Player	Ref.
(England) Bianca Owens	
