= Jodie Michalska =

English footballer (born 1986)

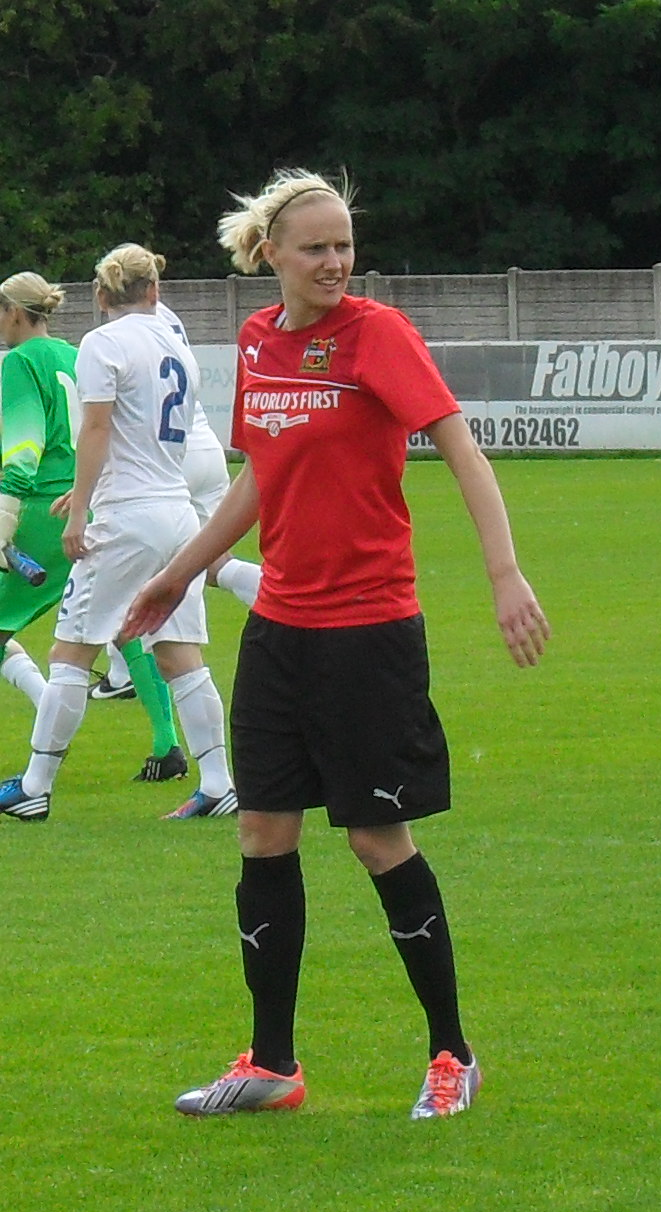

Personal information
- Full name: Jodie Michalska
- Date of birth: 2 September 1986 (age 40)
- Place of birth: Sheffield, England
- Height: 1.72 m (5 ft 8 in)
- Position: Forward

Team information
- Current team: Derby County
- Number: 19

Senior career*
Years	Team	Apps	(Gls)
2002–2006	Sheffield United Community		
2006–2010	Lincoln		
2011–2018	Sheffield		
2018–2019	Sheffield United	5	(0)
2019–2021	Derby County		
2021–	Barnsley		
- * Club domestic league appearances and goals as of 18:58, 14 November 2018 (UTC)

Jodie Michalska (née Snelson; born 2 September 1986) is an English footballer who plays as a striker for Barnsley WFC of the FA Women's National League North. She previously spent four seasons with Lincoln Ladies of the FA Women's Premier League Northern Division.

== Club career ==
Michalska scored 75 goals in 25 games during the 2005–06 season for East Midlands Premier League club Sheffield United Community Ladies FC. The team remained unbeaten and secured a League and Cup "double", in their most successful season since Tony Currie had founded the club in 2002. During her time at United, Michalska scored a last-minute winner against Sheffield Wednesday to secure The Blades' first ever win over The Owls in the female Steel City derby. Michalska earned a summer 2006 transfer to Lincoln City, who competed in the FA Women's Premier League Northern Division, then the second tier of women's football in England.

In 2006–07 Michalska finished as the Northern Premier League's top goal-scorer, collecting the award at that year's The FA Women's Football Awards. She scored a total of 35 goals in 2007–08 to retain her top goal-scorer award. Although Lincoln narrowly missed out on promotion, Michalska agreed to extend her contract with the club. Club chairman Geoff Adams praised Michalska's ability and loyalty: "it is a huge credit to this player who is, quite frankly, good enough to play for any club presently in the National Division, to show her loyalty to her club and put pen to paper so early."

England striker Amanda Barr joined Lincoln for the 2008–09 season as the club sought promotion to the Premier League National Division. In November 2008 Michalska and Barr scored four goals each in a 9–0 win at Rotherham United. Lincoln missed promotion after finishing second in both 2008–09 and 2009–10, but successfully bid for one of eight licences for the new FA WSL. Michalska was one of nine players from Lincoln's Northern Premier League squad to be invited back to try out for a place in the club's WSL team.

Following the birth of her first child Michalska returned to training with Lincoln ahead of the inaugural 2011 FA WSL season. In March 2011 she was sent on loan to Sheffield FC Ladies, in order to recover her fitness. Michalska scored on her debut for her home town club and helped the team to promotion from the Northern Combination in her first season. In 2011–12 Sheffield competed at Premier League Northern Division level for the first time, the third tier of English women's football following the introduction of the FA WSL. Michalska hit 42 goals across all competitions as the team finished runners-up to Manchester City in the League. She scored twice in the final against Sheffield Wednesday as the club won the Sheffield & Hallamshire County Cup for the first time.

Michalska remained with Sheffield in 2012–13, her 38 goals helping the team to win the Northern Premier League title. At The FA Women's Football Awards in 2013, she secured the award for Northern Premier League top goal-scorer for the fifth time in seven seasons. In November 2013 Michalska scored her 100th goal for Sheffield, in her 86th game for the club. Sheffield's manager Helen Mitchell gave Michalska the captaincy and paid tribute to her achievement: "She's one of a kind, and we are all desperately proud she plays for Sheffield FC. She's already a part of history here, but I am sure there’s a lot more to come yet."

Sheffield won the FA Women's Premier League Cup in May 2014, Michalska scoring the fourth goal in a 6–2 win over Cardiff City at the Pirelli Stadium in Burton upon Trent. In 2013–14 and 2014–15, Michalska retained her position as Northern Premier League top goal-scorer as Sheffield won the League on both occasions. In the latter season she helped the club beat Southern champions Portsmouth in a play-off for the FA WSL 2's newly available promotion slot. A hat-trick against Sporting Club Albion on the final day of the regular season took Michalska to 25 goals, 11 more than the League's next highest scorer, and also took her to the 200-goal mark for Sheffield.

Sheffield made an unexpectedly poor start in WSL 2, but Michalska scored in their first win at the higher level; a 3–1 home victory over Bristol City just before the mid-season break in May 2016.

== Personal life ==
In August 2008 Michalska married Carmen Michalska. Ex-soldier Carmen became known as the 'angel of Haiti' after rescuing a survivor 11 days after the 2010 Haiti earthquake. Their first child, a daughter named Faye, was born in December 2010 after a course of in vitro fertilisation.
