= 2014–15 Brighton & Hove Albion W.F.C. season =

Brighton & Hove Albion
2014–15 season
- Chairman: Tony Bloom
- Manager: James Marrs
- Stadium: Culver Road
- Premier Southern Division: Runners-up
- FA Cup: Third round
- League Cup: Quarter final

The 2014–15 Brighton & Hove Albion W.F.C season saw the club compete in the Women's Premier League Southern Division, narrowly losing out to Portsmouth who won the league.

The club finished the league table as runners-up, securing a total of 47 points from 22 matches.

== Moving to Culver Road ==
Culver Road underwent major pitch and facility upgrades during the 2014 calendar year, allowing it to become a premier venue for Lancing FC and women's football in the region. The club began using the ground as the primary ground for the first team during the 2014-15 season. Despite the move to Culver Road, they still occasionally used Withdean Stadium for specific cup fixtures and the women's development squad. On 12 January, the club won 6-2 against West Ham in the second round of the women's FA Cup.

== Managerial changes ==
In June 2014, manager John Donoghue departed the club after a year in charge. James Marrs was appointed as the new head coach, joining the club from Gillingham.
