= 2015–16 FA Women's Premier League Plate =

WPL Plate

Tournament details
- Country: England
- Teams: 33

Final positions
- Champions: Coventry United
- Runners-up: Enfield Town

Tournament statistics
- Matches played: 29
- Goals scored: 132 (4.55 per match)
- All statistics correct as of 6 March 2016.

The 2015–16 FA Women's Premier League Plate is the second running of the competition, which began in 2014. It is the secondary League Cup competition run by the FA Women's Premier League (FA WPL), and is run in parallel with the league's primary League Cup competition, the Premier League Cup.

The teams that take part in the WPL plate are decided after the first qualifying round of the WPL Cup, known as the Determining Round. The winners of Determining Round matches continue in the WPL Cup, while the losers move into the WPL Plate.

All 72 Premier League clubs were included in the Determining round draw, three of whom (Gloucester City, Swindon Spitfires and Wolverhampton Wanderers) withdrew from the competition before playing a match, meaning 36 teams progressed in the Cup and 33 were entered in the Plate.

Reigning champions Preston North End, who beat Huddersfield Town 3–0 in the 2014–15 final, won their Determining Round match this season, meaning that they did not defend their title.

== Results ==
Note: All results from The Football Association

=== Preliminary round ===
Due to there being 33 teams in the competition, a single preliminary round match was required to eliminate one team and allow a full single-elimination knockout tournament to take place.

27 September 2015	Chorley	2–1	Tranmere Rovers	Euxton
14:00	Coope 53'; King 90+4'	Report	Smith 77'	Stadium: Jim Fowler Memorial Ground

=== First round ===
4 October 2015	Bedford	0–3	Lewes
		Report	Louis-Joseph 37'; Lane 80'; Plewa 87'

4 October 2015	Birmingham & West Midlands	4–0	Leeds Ladies
14:00	Mooney 22'; Collins 30', 59'; Courtney 40'	Report		Attendance: 56

4 October 2015	Blackpool Wren Rovers	H–W	Rotherham United
14:00		Report

4 October 2015	Chorley	5–0	Steel City Wanderers
14:00	Wood 6', 30'; Harrison 21'; Higginson 49', 52'	Report

4 October 2015	Crystal Palace	5–0	Luton Town
14:00	Pyelt; Shakes; Robinson	Report

4 October 2015	Denham United	2–2 (a.e.t.) (4–3 p)	Milton Keynes Dons
	Capewell; Cox	Report	Goal

4 October 2015	Enfield Town	H–W	St Nicholas
14:00		Report

4 October 2015	Exeter City	1–2	Norwich City
12:00	Barter 36'	Report	Allsopp 5'; Gowers 85'	Attendance: 25

4 October 2015	Keynsham Town	4–0	Cheltenham Town	Keynsham
12:30	Lorton 13', 19', 42'; Lapham 73'	Report		Stadium: Crown Field; Attendance: 55

27 September 2015	Leafield Athletic	A–W	Loughborough Foxes
		Report

4 October 2015	Liverpool Marshall Feds	3–0	Solihull
14:00	Seagraves 25', 59'; Havelin 45'	Report		Attendance: 20

18 October 2015	Loughborough Students	2–1	Chester-le-Street	Loughborough
	Clements 75'	Report	Hockaday	Stadium: Loughborough University; Attendance: 12

4 October 2015	Maidenhead United	0–5	Coventry United	Maidenhead
14:00		Report	Dermody 11'; Neville 59', 61'; Selmes 69'; Formaston 79'	Stadium: York Road

4 October 2015	Newcastle United	7–2	Peterborough Northern Star
14:00	Ashenhurst; Fraser; Hewitt; Purdham; Turnbull	Report	Gallagher 6', 81'

4 October 2015	Southampton Saints	2–3	Gillingham
14:00	Nicholson 59'; Lewry 75'	Report	Wills; North	Attendance: 24

18 October 2015	Stockport County	4–1	Leicester City Ladies	Woodley
14:00	Blodgett; Douglas; Campbell	Report	Allen 24'	Stadium: Stockport Sports Village; Attendance: 55

=== Second round ===
20 December 2015	Birmingham & West Midlands	1–7	Liverpool Marshall Feds
	Eastwood 55'	Report	Wensley 3', 20', 25', 59'; Douglas 40'; Pope 43'; Havelin 85'	Attendance: 15

13 December 2015	Blackpool Wren Rovers	2–10	Newcastle United
14:00	Blore 17'; Pullen 60'	Report	Goal

29 November 2015	Crystal Palace	0–2	Coventry United
14:00		Report	Piggott 7'; Dermody 61'

20 December 2015	Enfield Town	1–0	Denham United	Enfield
14:00	Kent	Report		Stadium: Queen Elizabeth II Stadium

29 November 2015	Lewes	3–5 (a.e.t.)	Gillingham	Lewes
14:00	Spice 36'; Wells 68'; Lane 95'	Report	Baker-Carroll; Redhouse; Reece	Stadium: The Rookery; Attendance: 55

29 November 2015	Loughborough Foxes	5–1	Stockport County	Loughborough
14:00	Huskisson-Moore 12'; Pilling 75', 86'; Giampalma 79'	Report	Mapp 35'	Stadium: Holywell Sports Complex; Attendance: 30

29 November 2015	Loughborough Students	1–0	Chorley	Loughborough
14:00	Melvin 65'	Report		Stadium: Loughborough University

29 November 2015	Norwich City	2–7	Keynsham Town
12:00	Snelling 35', 79'	Report	García 29', 38', 54', 84'; Lapham 40', 56'; Foxwell 88'

=== Quarter-finals ===
31 January 2016	Coventry United	1–0	Liverpool Marshall Feds	Nuneaton
	Hall 62'	Report		Stadium: The Oval; Attendance: 63

31 January 2016	Gillingham	0–3	Newcastle United	Chatham
		Report	Dobson; Hewitt; Turnbull	Stadium: The Bauvill Stadium

21 February 2016	Loughborough Foxes	0–1	Enfield Town	Loughborough
		Report	Coleman	Stadium: Holywell Sports Complex; Attendance: 45

31 January 2016	Loughborough Students	0–4	Keynsham Town	Loughborough
		Report	Lapham 17'; García 58', 59'; Lorton 82'	Stadium: Loughborough University

=== Semi-finals ===
6 March 2016
14:00

Enfield Town	2–0	Newcastle United
Beganovic 39'; Bassett 84'	Report

Queen Elizabeth II Stadium, Enfield
6 March 2016
14:00

Keynsham Town	0–7	Coventry United
	Report	Neville 6'; Gauntlett 12', 59'; Hughes 29', 61', 81'; Lorton-Radburn 75' (o.g.)

Crown Field, Keynsham
Attendance: 50

=== Final ===
24 April 2016
15:00

Enfield Town	1–5	Coventry United
Kent	Report	Formaston 5'; Piggott 45'; Johannesson 49'; Gauntlett 82', 89'

Keys Park, Hednesford
