= Ashleigh Neville =

English footballer

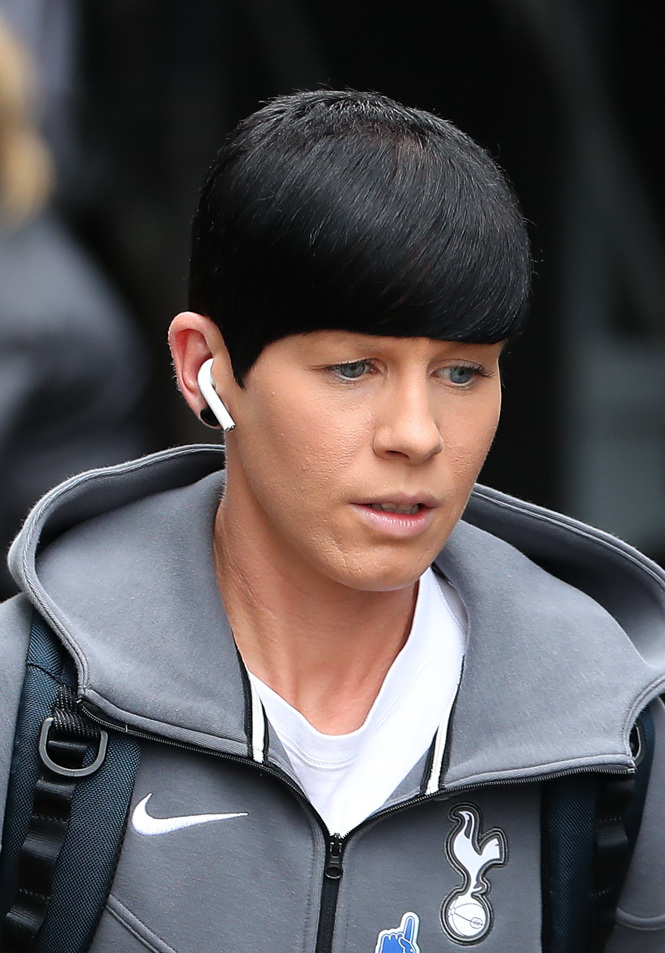
- Neville in 2024

Personal information
- Full name: Ashleigh Neville
- Date of birth: 29 April 1993 (age 33)
- Place of birth: West Bromwich, England
- Height: 1.71 m (5 ft 7 in)
- Position: Fullback

Team information
- Current team: Charlton Athletic
- Number: 29

Senior career*
Years	Team	Apps	(Gls)
2011–2013	Sporting Club Albion	33	(16)
2013–2017	Coventry United	69	(20)
2017–2026	Tottenham Hotspur	151	(14)
2026	Leicester City	11	(0)
2026–	Charlton Athletic	0	(0)
- * Club domestic league appearances and goals as of 15:20, 29 July 2026 (UTC)

Ashleigh Neville (born 29 April 1993) is an English professional footballer who plays as a full-back for Women's Super League club Charlton Athletic.

She previously played for fellow WSL sides Leicester City and Tottenham Hotspur, and Sporting Club Albion and Coventry City in the FA Women's Premier League.

== Career ==
=== Sporting Club Albion ===
Neville began her career with her local club Sporting Club Albion. Her final season with the club was the 2012–13 FA WPL season in which she made 23 appearances and scored 14 goals in all competitions, while her team finished fourth out of nine teams in the third level Northern Division.

=== Coventry United ===
Neville joined newly founded Coventry City for the 2013–14 season. In her time with the club she had 69 appearances and 20 goals. She made 20 appearances for the club, now known as Coventry United, in the 2016–17 season, her final with the team.

=== Tottenham Hotspur ===
On 14 July 2017, Neville was announced as having signed for Tottenham Hotspur after their promotion to the FA WSL 2 for the 2017–18 season. Her former club Coventry United were title rivals with Tottenham in the FA WPL Premier Division Southern Division, but fell four points behind Spurs, who won promotion.

Neville appeared in 36 matches and scored a total of five goals during her first two seasons with the club. Neville was named Player of the Year for Tottenham for 2017–18, and was FAWC Player of the Month for April 2019. Tottenham's first top flight season would ultimately end prematurely, but Neville appeared in 13 of 15 matches and helped Spurs finish seventh out of twelve sides.

On 12 June 2020, Neville re-signed with Tottenham through the end of the 2022 season. In the 2021–22 WSL season, Neville was ranked first for tackles and interceptions, and for the 2022–23 and 2023–24 seasons, she would continue to be ranked first for tackles.

=== Leicester City ===
On 8 January 2026, Neville signed a one and a half year contract with Leicester City.

=== Charlton Athletic ===
In July 2026, Neville joined newly-promoted WSL side Charlton Athletic on a two-year contract.

== Personal life ==
Neville married her wife Liz in June 2022. She and her partner have three children. She previously worked as a full-time primary school teacher, where she would travel from her home in Birmingham to London two to three times a week to train before turning fully professional in 2017.

== Career statistics ==
=== Club ===
As of match played 11 January 2026

Appearances and goals by club, season and competition
Club	Season	League			FA cup		League cup (Note: includes FA Women's National League Cup, FA Women's National League Plate, FA Women's League Cup)		Total	
Club	Season	Division	Apps	Goals	Apps	Goals	Apps	Goals	Apps	Goals
Sporting Club Albion	2011–12	Women's Premier League North	19	7	0	0	0	0	19	7
Sporting Club Albion	2012–13	Women's Premier League North	14	9	3	1	3	2	20	12
Sporting Club Albion	Total		33	16	3	1	3	2	39	19
Coventry United	2013–14	Women's Premier League South	17	4	4	0	3	1	24	5
Coventry United	2014–15	Women's Premier League South	17	7	4	0	4	0	25	7
Coventry United	2015–16	Women's Premier League South	18	5	2	1	4	3	24	9
Coventry United	2016–17	Women's Premier League South	17	4	4	0	3	1	24	5
Coventry United	Total		69	20	14	1	14	5	97	26
Tottenham Hotspur	2017–18	Women's Championship	17	1	0	0	4	0	21	1
Tottenham Hotspur	2018–19	Women's Championship	19	4	2	1	4	0	25	5
Tottenham Hotspur	2019–20	Women's Super League	13	0	2	0	3	0	18	0
Tottenham Hotspur	2020–21	Women's Super League	12	2	3	0	3	0	18	2
Tottenham Hotspur	2021–22	Women's Super League	21	3	2	0	3	0	26	3
Tottenham Hotspur	2022–23	Women's Super League	21	3	2	0	1	1	24	4
Tottenham Hotspur	2023–24	Women's Super League	19	1	4	0	2	0	25	1
Tottenham Hotspur	2024–25	Women's Super League	21	0	1	0	4	0	26	0
Tottenham Hotspur	2025–26	Women's Super League	8	0	0	0	1	0	9	0
Tottenham Hotspur	Total		151	14	16	1	25	1	192	16
Leicester City	2025–26	Women's Super League	1	0	0	0	0	0	1	0
Career total			254	50	33	3	42	8	329	61

== Honours ==
Coventry United

- FA Women's National League Plate: 2015–16

Tottenham Hotspur

- Women's FA Cup: 2023–24 runner-up

Individual

- Women's Super League Player of the Month: February 2022
- Women's Super League Goal of the Month: September 2022
- Women's Championship Player of the Month: 2018–19
- Tottenham Hotspur Player of the Year: 2017–18
