= 1994–95 FA Women's Premier League Cup =

Tournament details
- Country: England

Final positions
- Champions: Wimbledon
- Runners-up: Villa Aztecs

The 1994–95 FA Women's Premier League Cup was the 4th staging of the FA Women's Premier League Cup, a knockout competition for England's top 36 women's football clubs.

Due to England's participation in the 1995 World Cup, the FA barred National Division sides from competing in the League Cup. This meant reigning champions Arsenal could not defend their trophy. Instead, only teams in the Northern and Southern divisions could take part.

The tournament was won by Wimbledon, who beat Villa Aztecs 2–0 in the final.

== Results ==
=== First round ===
First round ties were played on the 9th October 1994.

9 October 1994	Kidderminster Harriers (NO)	2–3	Langford (NO)
	Goal	Report	Goal

9 October 1994	Sheffield Wednesday (NO)	1–3	Bronte (NO)
	Goal	Report	Goal

9 October 1994	Wimbledon (S)	3–0	Horsham (S)
	Goal	Report

=== Second round ===
Second round ties were played on the 26th February and the 5th March 1995

26 February 1995	Bronte (NO)	2–0	St Helens/Garswood (NO)
	Goal	Report

26 February 1995	Brighton & Hove Albion	3–4	Wimbledon (S)
	Goal	Report	Goal

26 February 1995	Cowgate Kestrels (NO)	0–5	Villa Aztecs (NO)
		Report	Masters; Sheppard; Hurley

26 February 1995	Langford (NO)	2–2 (a.e.t.) (7–8 p)	Ipswich Town (NO)
	Goal	Report	Goal
	Penalties
	Penalty scored Penalty missed		Penalty scored

26 February 1995	Nottingham Argyle (NO)	0–3	Solihull Borough (NO)
		Report	Goal

26 February 1995	Town & County (S)	1–5	Maidstone Tigresses (S)
	Goal	Report	Goal

5 March 1995	Town & County (S)	0–5	Maidstone Tigresses (S)
		Report	Goal

=== Quarter-finals ===
Quarter-finals were played on the 26th March 1995.

26 March 1995	Berkahmsted & Hemel (S)	1–3	Oxford United (S)
	Goal	Report	Goal

26 March 1995	Maidstone Tigresses (S)	3–4	Villa Aztecs (NO)
	Goal	Report	Masters

26 March 1995	Solihull Borough (NO)	0–6	Ipswich Town (NO)
		Report	Goal

26 March 1995	Wimbledon (S)	1–1 (a.e.t.) (3–1 p)	Bronte (NO)
	Goal	Report	Goal
	Penalties
	Penalty scored		Penalty scored Penalty missed

=== Semi-finals ===
Semi-finals were played on the 9th April 1995.

9 April 1995	Villa Aztecs (NO)	1–1 (a.e.t.) (4–1 p)	Ipswich Town (NO)
	Goal	Report	Goal
	Penalties
	Penalty scored		Penalty scored Penalty missed

9 April 1995	Wimbledon (S)	2–1	Oxford United (S)
	Goal	Report	Goal

=== Final ===
23 April 1995

Villa Aztecs	0–2	Wimbledon
	Report	Whitlock

Butlin Road, Rugby
Referee: Mr G. Spooner (Sheffield)
