= Michelle Walsh =

Irish footballer

Personal information
- Full name: Michelle Walsh
- Date of birth: 2 August 1982 (age 44)
- Place of birth: Dublin, Ireland
- Height: 5 ft 3 in (1.60 m)
- Position: Midfielder

Youth career
- St. Catherine's

Senior career*
| Years | Team | Apps | (Gls) |
| 2002 | New Hampshire Lady Phantoms | | |
| 2002–2004 | Leeds United | | |
| 2004–2007 | Doncaster Rovers Belles | | |
| 2007–2008 | Blackburn Rovers | | |
| 2008–2011 | Leeds City Vixens | | |
| 2013–2015 | Guiseley A.F.C. Vixens | | |

International career^{‡}
| 1998–2006 | Republic of Ireland | | |
- * Club domestic league appearances and goals as of 20:14, 17 August 2024 (UTC) ‡ National team caps and goals as of 20:14, 17 August 2024 (UTC)

Michelle Walsh (born 2 August 1982) is an Irish former footballer. She most recently played as a midfielder for Yorkshire Amateur and has represented the Republic of Ireland national team.

== Club career ==
Walsh's club career started as a young girl in Dublin and has since taken her all over the globe, playing in USA and currently in the UK. She has played for the following clubs: Leeds United, Doncaster Rovers Belles, Blackburn Rovers and Leeds City Vixens. In 2001 she reportedly took up a college soccer scholarship to Lindsey Wilson College, and during the 2002 season she signed for W-League club New Hampshire Lady Phantoms.

She signed for Guiseley A.F.C. Vixens in 2013 and also represented the women's section of Yorkshire Amateur AFC, before retiring in 2022.

== International career ==
Walsh has represented the Republic of Ireland at all age levels and the senior women's team, competing in European and World Cup qualifiers at full international level.
