= Lauren Townsend (footballer) =

Welsh footballer

Lauren Hutton-Townsend
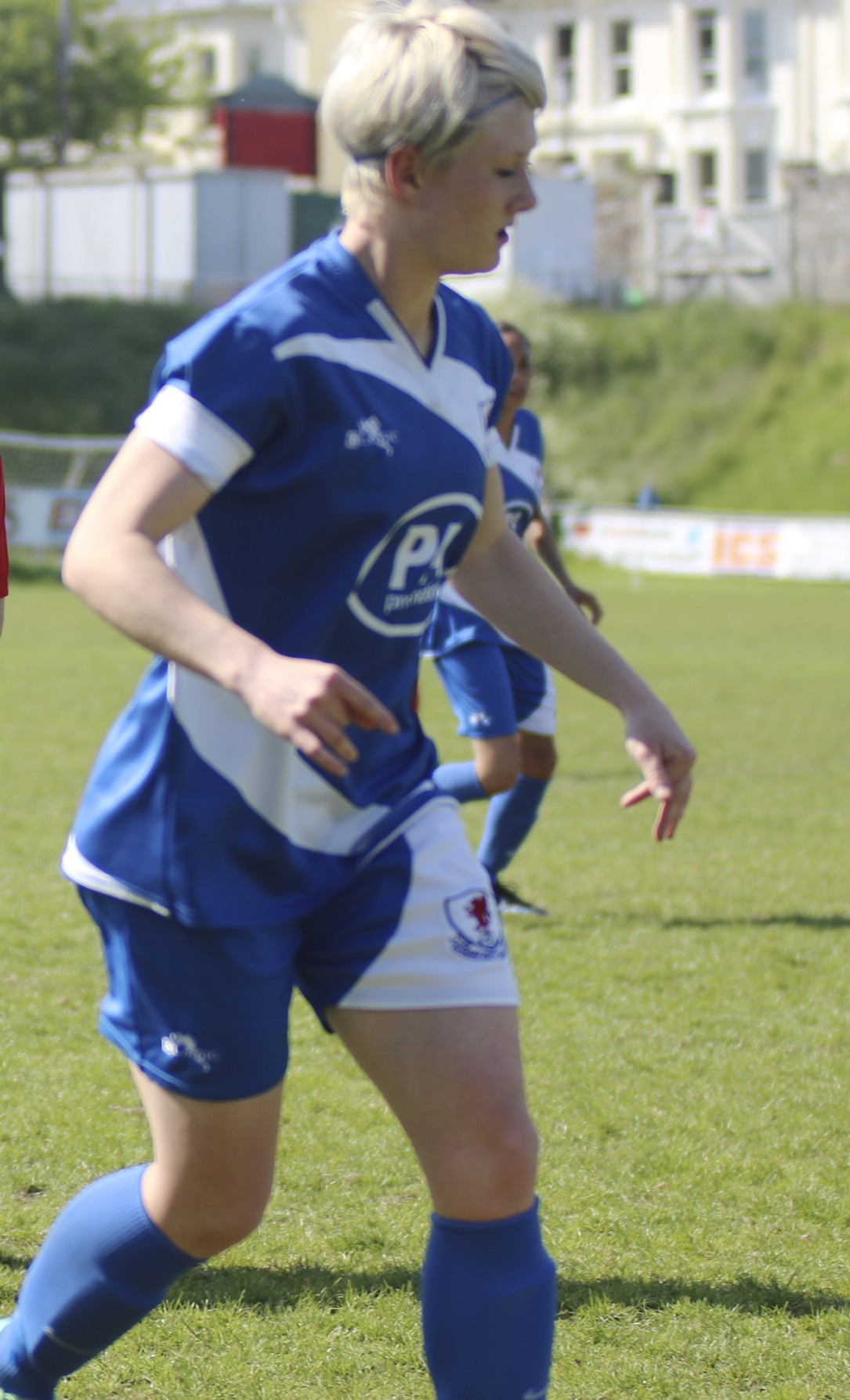
- Lauren Hutton-Townsend in May 2014

Personal information
- Date of birth: 10 November 1990 (age 35)
- Position: Defender

Team information
- Current team: Cardiff City LFC
- Number: 20

Youth career
- Cardiff City LFC

Senior career*
Years	Team	Apps	(Gls)
2006–2015	Cardiff City LFC		
2015	Bristol Academy	6	(0)
2016–2017	Yeovil Town	8	(0)
2017– 2019	Cardiff Met.		(0)
2022-	Cardiff City LFC		

International career^{‡}
2008–	Wales	14	(0)
- * Club domestic league appearances and goals as of 14:40, 23 April 2018 (UTC) ‡ National team caps and goals as of 15:25, 7 February 2016 (UTC)

Lauren Hutton-Townsend (born 10 November 1990) is a footballer who plays as a defender for the Wales national team and Cardiff City LFC. Townsend won 20 caps for Wales at under-19 level. She made her senior debut on 30 January 2008; a 1–1 friendly draw with Portugal in Mafra, Portugal.
