= Jade Thomas =

Welsh footballer (born 1982)

Jade Thomas (born 10 December 1982) is a Welsh female football player for Liverpool Ladies and the Welsh Women's National team. She has won the Women's Premier League and also been relegated with Liverpool. She joined LFC Ladies in 2000 and plays as a winger or forward.

Jade was born in St Asaph, the daughter of former Everton player Mickey Thomas and supports Everton despite ironically playing for their Merseyside rivals. Her mother was a former Miss Wales.

Jade also appeared on popular sports show Soccer AM in the early stages on the 2006-07 Season as a Soccerette
