= Sophie Jones (English footballer) =

English footballer

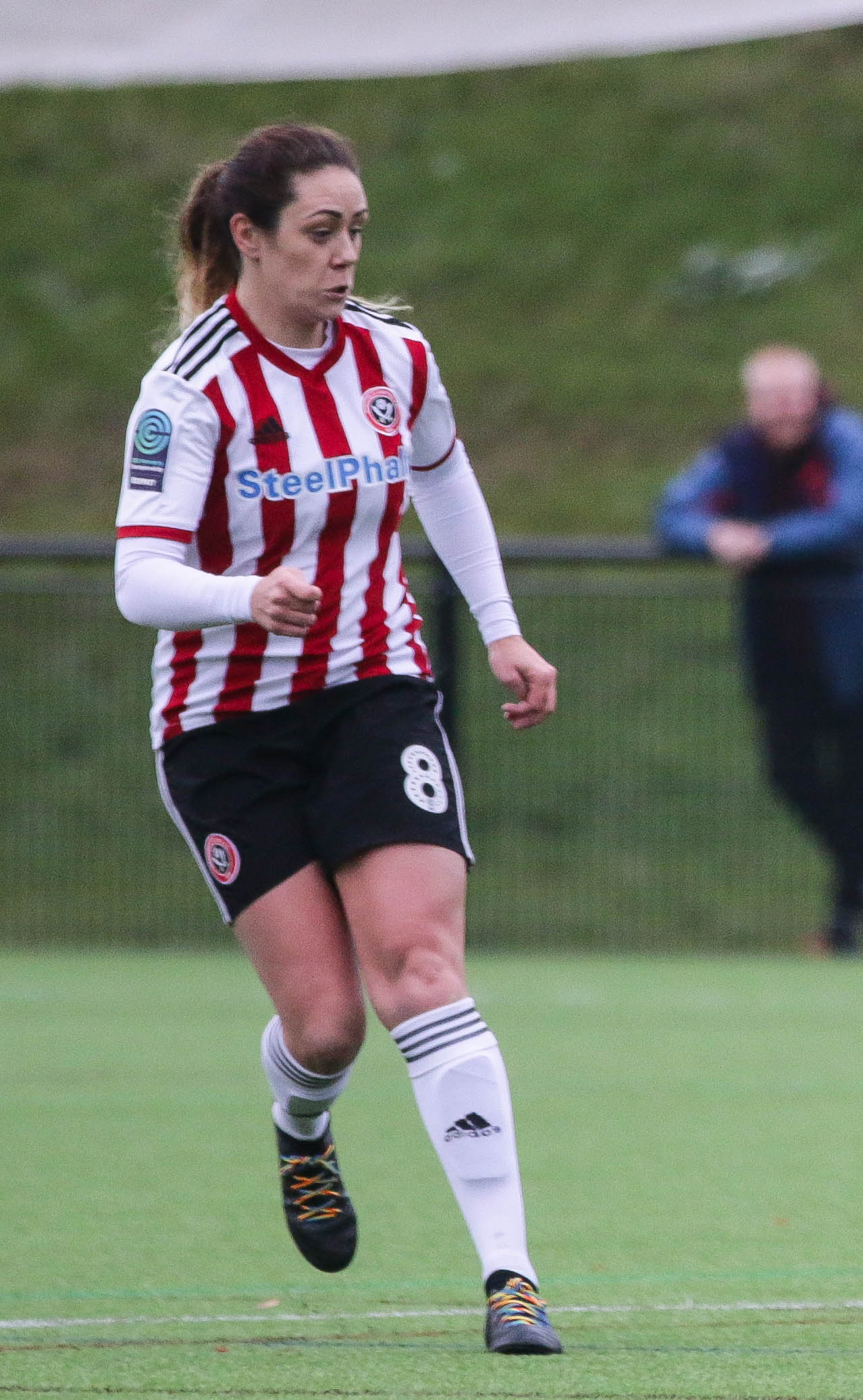

Personal information
- Full name: Sophie Jones
- Date of birth: 3 January 1992 (age 34)
- Place of birth: Liverpool, England
- Height: 1.65 m (5 ft 5 in)
- Position: Forward

Youth career
- Liverpool

Senior career*
Years	Team	Apps	(Gls)
2008–2012	Liverpool		
2012–2014	Preston North End		
2014–2016	Blackburn Rovers		
2016–2017	Sheffield	6	(1)
2018–2019	Sheffield United	8	(6)
- * Club domestic league appearances and goals as of 9 February 2019

Sophie Jones (born 3 January 1992) is an English former professional women's football player. The forward started her career with Liverpool and moved on to Preston North End Ladies. After a single season with the club, Jones moved to Blackburn Rovers Ladies, where she scored 14 goals in only 20 appearances in her final season. Jones joined Sheffield FC in July 2016. Following a season with the team, Jones then joined cross-town rivals Sheffield United, playing with the club in their first season in the FA Women's Championship.

== Football ==
Jones is a forward, who wears number 8.

=== Professional career ===
Jones started top flight football with the Preston North End Ladies, where she played for a single season.

She then moved to the Blackburn Rovers Ladies, where she scored 14 goals in only 20 appearances over two season. In October 2014, Jones participated in the Lancashire County Cup. She scored in the Rovers's win against Preston North End. In 2015, she played with the Rovers in the FA Women's Premier League Cup. In the first round 4–2 victory against Huddersfield Town, Jones scored a goal in extra time to send her team through to the next round. In October 2015, her team had put together a 4-game winning streak. The fourth match was against Guiseley Vixens, with Jones scoring a pair of goals in her team's 5–0 win.

Jones joined Sheffield FC in July 2016. She said of the transfer, “I'm very happy to sign for such great club, with one with a great history in women's football. This is an exciting time for myself to start a new challenge, and to hopefully help the team achieve success in the FA WSL 2.”

Jones then played for Sheffield United. The team was in the first division for the first time for the 2018–2019 season. The team's first win of the season was against Aston Villa, where Jones contributed 3 goals in their 4–1 victory. In December 2018, her team played Millwall Lionesses in a FA Women's Championship match. Jones scored the only goal in her team's 1–1 draw ten minutes into the second half. In another match in December 2018, her team lost 5–1 to Aston Villa. Jones scored the only goal of the game on a penalty kick.

In 2019, Jones was charged with violating FA rule E3 [1] and E3 [2] by England's Football Association after a four-week investigation. The incident occurred on 6 January against Tottenham Hotspur 2–1 away win in an FA Women's Championship match, with the charge occurring in February 2019. After the match, Renée Hector alleged to officials that an unknown United player made monkey noises at her. Spurs then reported the incident to the Football Association. Jones had until 15 February to respond. Sheffield United indicated that they had co-operated with the FA's investigation and would deny the charges at a forthcoming disciplinary hearing.

As a result of the investigation, Jones was banned for five games by the Football Association for racial abuse. Following the ban, by mutual consent, Sophie Jones left Sheffield United. She later stated that she was quitting football, saying she was "unable to play under an organisation that I do not have any confidence in".

== Personal ==
She was born in Liverpool, England.
