= Avilla Bergin =

Northern Ireland footballer

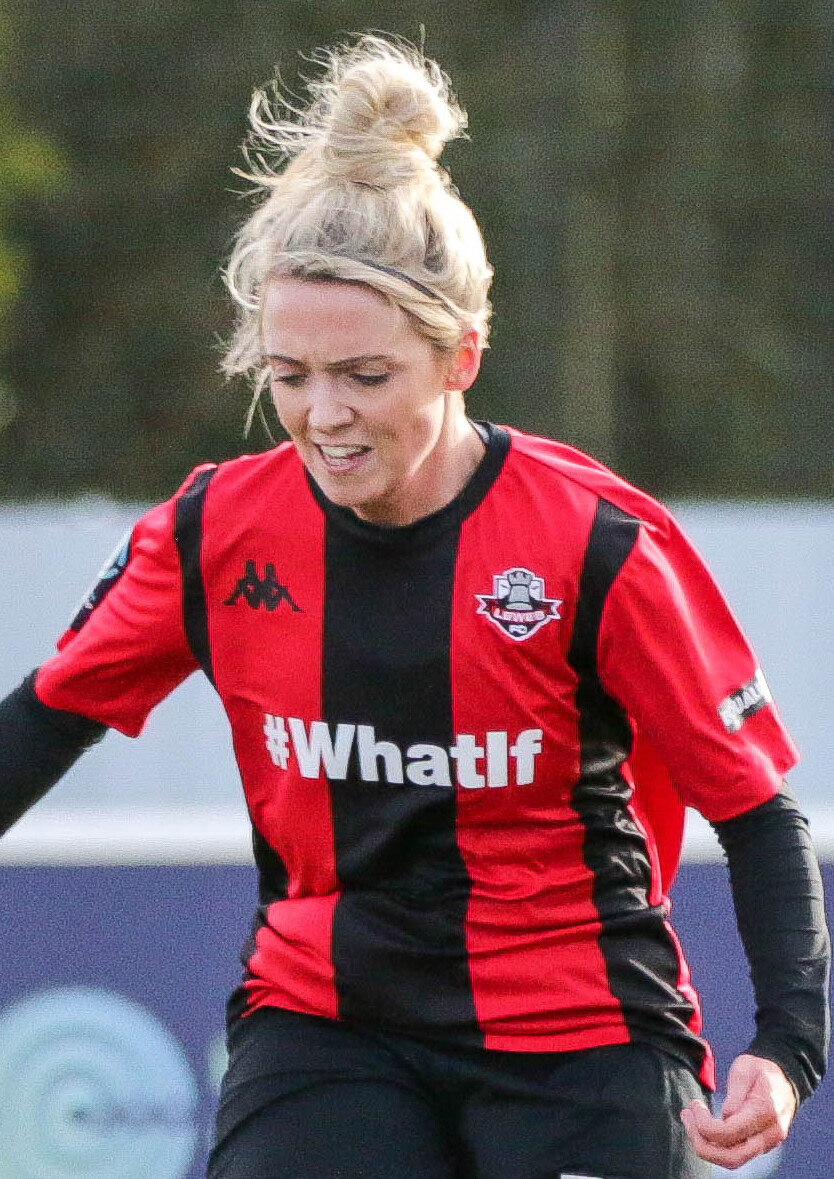

Personal information
- Full name: Avilla Bergin
- Date of birth: 1 August 1991 (age 35)
- Place of birth: Dublin, Ireland
- Height: 5 ft 6 in (1.68 m)
- Position: Forward

College career
Years	Team	Apps	(Gls)
2010	Fordham Rams		

Senior career*
Years	Team	Apps	(Gls)
2014–2016	Tottenham Hotspur	39	(18)
2016–2017	Charlton Athletic	18	(4)
2017–2020	Lewes	29	(7)
2022–2023	Saltdean United		

International career^{‡}
- Northern Ireland U13
- Northern Ireland U17
- Northern Ireland U19
2009–2017	Northern Ireland	8	(2)
- * Club domestic league appearances and goals ‡ National team caps and goals as of 23:37, 24 October 2015 (UTC)

Avilla Bergin (born 1 August 1991) is an association football forward from Northern Ireland who has featured for various clubs as well as the Northern Ireland women's national football team.

== Early life ==
Bergin was born in Dublin but grew up in Derry and attended Thornhill College. She played for a boys' team before joining Derry F.C., where she came to the attention of Northern Ireland youth national team selectors at the under-13 level.

== Club career ==
In 2010 she played for YMCA Ladies in the Northern Ireland Women's Premier League, but her appearances were curtailed by injury.

That same year she moved to the United States and attended Fordham University in New York City on a college soccer scholarship. She started ten of her 17 appearances for the Fordham Rams. The following year she moved to England to attend Loughborough University, where she played in the British Universities and Colleges Sport Football League. Following her graduation from Loughborough in 2014 she joined FA Women's Premier League Southern Division club Tottenham Hotspur.

After scoring 18 goals in 39 league appearances for Spurs, Bergin left for Charlton Athletic in June 2016. She reasoned that Charlton had better promotion prospects. After one season Bergin signed for Lewes, who had decided to pay their men's and women's teams the same. "Straight away it makes you feel valued," Bergin said.

Bergin featured for Saltdean United in the 2022–23 London and South East Women's Regional Football League Premier League season.

== International career ==
Bergin was initially scouted for Northern Ireland's youth national teams while playing in the Women's Premiership. She featured for youth national sides starting at the under-13 level, also appearing for Northern Ireland at the U-17 and U-19 European Championships before eventually gaining her first call up for the senior side in 2009. Notable performances for Northern Ireland's senior team include a brace against Bulgaria and providing the winning assist against Portugal on 19 January 2017.
