= Amanda Crump =

English footballer (born 1989)

Personal information
- Date of birth: 31 August 1989 (age 37)
- Place of birth: Ipswich, England
- Position: Midfielder

Senior career*
Years	Team	Apps	(Gls)
2000-2021	Ipswich Town	216	
- * Club domestic league appearances and goals

Amanda Crump (31 August 1989) is a retired English footballer who played as a defender for Ipswich Town. She is Ipswich Town's record appearance holder with 200 appearances.
