= Charlotte Gurr =

English footballer

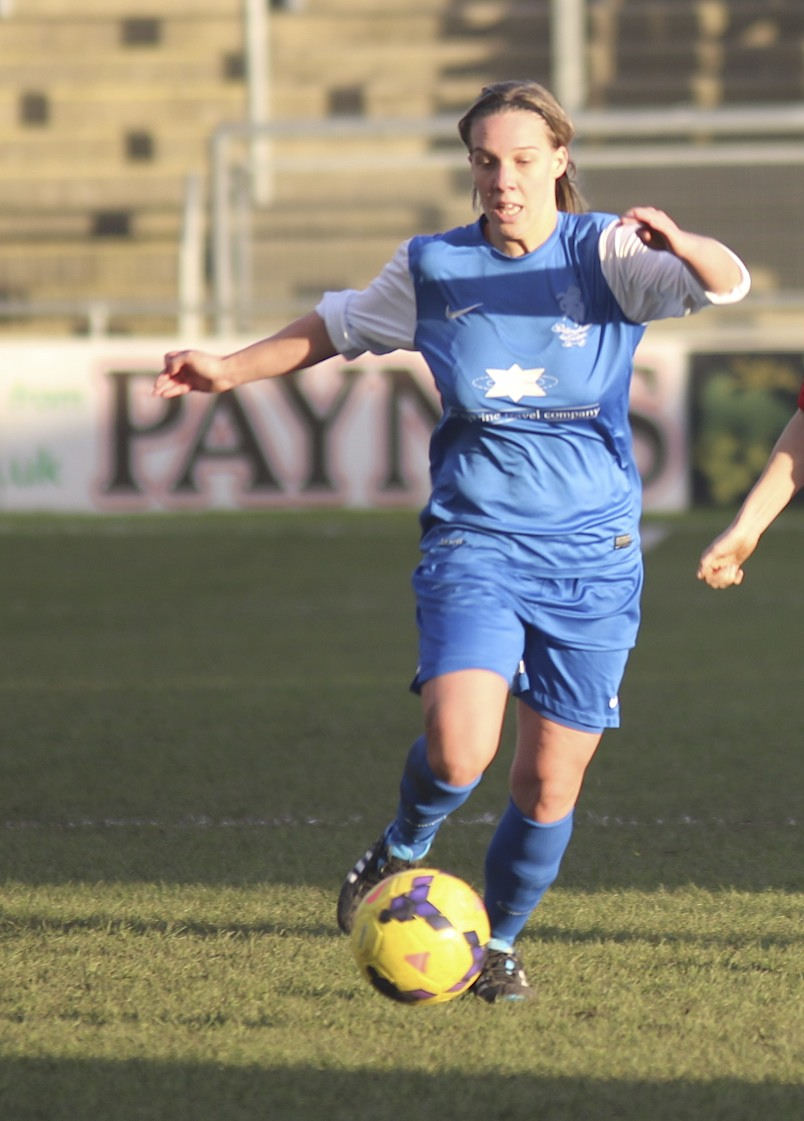

Personal information
- Full name: Charlotte Emily Gurr
- Date of birth: 16 August 1989 (age 37)
- Place of birth: England
- Position: Midfielder

Team information
- Current team: Hastings United Women
- Number: 18

Youth career
- Kent Magpies
- Arsenal

Senior career*
| Years | Team | Apps | (Gls) |
| 2004–2007 | Arsenal | 6 | (6) |
| 2007–2008 | Chelsea | 0 | (0) |
| 2008–2012 | Millwall | 38 | (7) |
| 2012–2013 | Brighton & Hove Albion | 9 | (1) |
| 2012–2014 | Gillingham | 28 | (17) |
| 2014–2016 | Brighton & Hove Albion | 36 | (18) |
| 2016–2017 | Gillingham | 15 | (23) |
| 2017 | West Ham United | 4 | (1) |
| 2017–2019 | Charlton Athletic | 41 | (28) |
| 2019–2020 | London City Lionesses | 1 | (0) |
| 2020–2022 | Charlton Athletic | 7 | (0) |
- * Club domestic league appearances and goals as of 13 October 2019

Charlotte Emily Gurr (born 16 August 1989) is an English footballer who plays as a midfielder for Hastings United Women. She is a former England under-19 international.

== Club career ==
Gurr joined the Arsenal Ladies Academy at age 14 from Millwall Lionesses and played mainly for the reserves, though she made both her League and UEFA Women's Cup debuts in 2006. She moved to Chelsea Ladies, but returned to Millwall Lionesses in the summer of 2008. That was after playing for Bristol Academy at a tournament in Spain in May 2008. The following season she was part of the Millwall side that won the FA Women's Premier League Southern Division, and with it promotion back to the National Division.

Gurr signed for Hastings United Women in July 2022. She currently plays for L&SEWFL side Eastbourne Borough Women.
