= FA Women's National League Cup =

Women's National League Cup
- Founded: 1991; 35 years ago
- Region: England
- Teams: 72
- Current champions: AFC Bournemouth (1st title)
- Most championships: Arsenal (10 titles)
- 2026–27 WNL Cup

The FA Women's National League Cup is an annual English football cup competition, founded in 1991 by the Women's Football Association (WFA).

The first edition of the Cup included clubs from the 1991–92 WFA National League Premier Division and the winners were the second-tier Arsenal, who beat Millwall 1–0 with a goal by Naz Ball. The Football Association assumed the running of the competition in 1994–95.

Clubs from league levels 1 and 2 competed in the Women's Premier League Cup tournament annually until 2009–10, with Arsenal the most frequent winners, in ten seasons. From 2011 onwards, the top-league teams played in the FA WSL's League Cup instead. Since 2011, the most successful clubs in the Premier/National League Cup have been Tottenham and Blackburn with two final victories each.

The current Women's National League Cup is open to the 72 teams in the FA Women's National League – Northern and Southern divisions, plus the four regional Division One leagues. It is the women's football equivalent to the men's EFL Trophy of third- and fourth-tier teams, although the competitions are organised by different governing bodies.

A change to the format of the competition from the 2025-26 season onwards has seen the entry of Professional Game Academy sides for the first time.

== Format ==
The competitions format has changed through the years, with some seasons having previously also included a preceding group stage prior to the knockout rounds.

After the league restructuring of the Women's Premier League in 2015 up to 72 teams are eligible to participate. At first all teams are drawn against each other in the determining round. The winning teams then are drawn into either a preliminary round or directly into the first round of the cup. Thus 32 teams then play the first round.

The losers of the determining round play a preliminary round and then a round of 32 onwards for the FA Women's National League Plate, first played out in 2015–16.

The 2025–26 season saw a change to the format of the League Cup, with the introduction of a group stage and entry of Professional Game Academy sides for the first time. Teams were initially drawn into 22 groups of four teams, from which the 22 group winners and 10 best runners-up advanced to the Cup knockout stages. The other 12 runners-up, and 20 best third-placed teams advanced to the National League Plate knockout stages. From there, both the Cup and the Plate held four knockout rounds before the finals of each competition.

== 1993 Wembley final ==
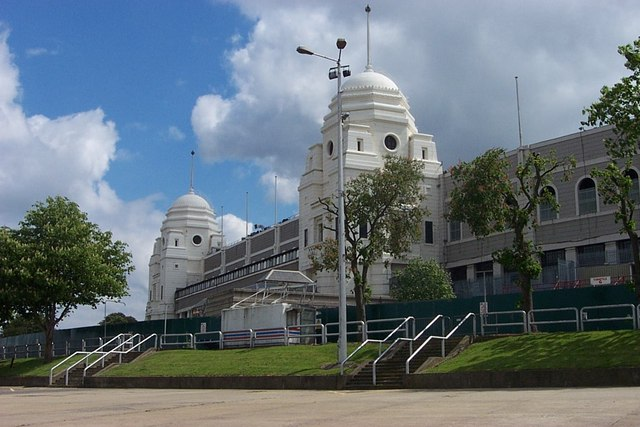
The old Wembley Stadium

The 1992–93 competition ended with a final at Wembley Stadium. Before a sparse crowd, Arsenal beat Knowsley United 3–0 to retain the trophy.

This was one of very few competitive women's club games known to have been held at the old Wembley Stadium; it also remains the only women's League Cup final to be played at Wembley.

The match was held prior to the 1993 Football League Third Division play-off final. Arsenal manager Vic Akers recalled that the women's teams were not given use of the main dressing rooms.

== List of seasons and finals ==
Level 1 and 2 league cup competition:

Season	Winner	Runner-up	Score	Venue
1991–92	Arsenal	Millwall Lionesses	1–0	Alt Park, Huyton
1992–93	Arsenal	Knowsley United	3–0	Wembley, London
1993–94	Arsenal	Doncaster Belles	4–0	Abbey Stadium, Cambridge
1994–95	Wimbledon	Villa Aztecs	2–0	Butlin Road, Rugby
1995–96	Wembley	Doncaster Belles	2–2 (5–3 pen.)	Underhill Stadium, Chipping Barnet
1996–97	Millwall Lionesses	Everton	2–1	Underhill Stadium, Chipping Barnet
1997–98	Arsenal	Croydon	0–0 (4–3 pen.)	Underhill Stadium, Chipping Barnet
1998–99	Arsenal	Everton	3–1	Prenton Park, Birkenhead
1999–2000	Arsenal	Croydon	4–1	Underhill Stadium, Chipping Barnet
2000–01	Arsenal	Tranmere Rovers	3–0	Deva Stadium, Chester
2001–02	Fulham	Birmingham City	7–1	Adams Park, Wycombe
2002–03	Fulham	Arsenal	1–1 a.e.t. (3–2 pen.)	County Ground, Swindon
2003–04	Charlton Athletic	Fulham	1–0	Underhill Stadium, Chipping Barnet
2004–05	Arsenal	Charlton Athletic	3–0	Griffin Park, Brentford
2005–06	Charlton Athletic	Arsenal	2–1	Adams Park, Wycombe
2006–07	Arsenal	Leeds United	1–0	Glanford Park, Scunthorpe
2007–08	Everton	Arsenal	1–0	Brisbane Road, Leyton
2008–09	Arsenal	Doncaster Rovers Belles	5–0	Glanford Park, Scunthorpe
2009–10	Leeds Carnegie	Everton	3–1	Spotland, Rochdale

Level 2 and 3 cup competition:

Season	Winner	Runner-up	Score	Venue
2010–11	Barnet	Nottingham Forest	0–0 a.e.t. (4–3 pen.)	Adams Park, Wycombe
2011–12	Sunderland	Leeds United	2–1	Sixfields Stadium, Northampton
2012–13	Aston Villa	Leeds United	0–0 a.e.t. (5–4 pen.)	Bootham Crescent, York

Level 3 and 4 cup competition (Women's Premier League Cup, renamed National League Cup in 2018–19):

Season	Winner	Runner-up	Score	Venue
2013–14	Sheffield	Cardiff City	6–2	Pirelli Stadium, Burton upon Trent
2014–15	Charlton Athletic	Sheffield	0–0 a.e.t. (4–2 pen.)	Liberty Way, Nuneaton
2015–16	Tottenham Hotspur	Cardiff City	2–1 a.e.t.	Aggborough, Kidderminster
2016–17	Tottenham Hotspur	Charlton Athletic	0–0 a.e.t. (4–3 pen.)	Broadhall Way, Stevenage
2017–18	Blackburn Rovers	Leicester City	3–1	Proact Stadium, Chesterfield
2018–19	Blackburn Rovers	Crawley Wasps	3–0	Pirelli Stadium, Burton upon Trent
2019–20	Stoke City–Sunderland cancelled due to COVID-19 pandemic			
2020–21	Competition cancelled due to COVID-19 pandemic			
2021–22	Southampton	Huddersfield Town	3–0	Damson Park, Solihull
2022–23	Nottingham Forest	Watford	3–2 a.e.t.	Pirelli Stadium, Burton upon Trent
2023–24	Hashtag United	Newcastle United	2–1	Kenilworth Road, Luton
2024–25	Nottingham Forest	Stoke City	3–1	Bescot Stadium, Walsall
2025–26	AFC Bournemouth	Plymouth Argyle	1-0	Loftus Road, Shepherd's Bush

== Performance by club ==
Until 2010 it was England's main League Cup competition, when it was replaced by the FA Women's League Cup in 2011.

Club	Winners	Runners-up	Winning years
Arsenal	10	3	1991–92, 1992–93, 1993–94, 1997–98, 1998–99, 1999–00, 2000–01, 2004–05, 2006–07, 2008–09
Croydon/Charlton Athletic	3	3	2003–04, 2005–06, 2014–15
Fulham	2	1	2001–02, 2002–03
Nottingham Forest	2	1	2022–23, 2024–25
Wembley/Barnet	2	-	1995–96, 2010–11
Blackburn Rovers	2	-	2017–18, 2018–19
Tottenham Hotspur	2	-	2015–16, 2016–17
Leeds United	1	3	2009–2010
Everton	1	2	2007–08
Millwall Lionesses	1	1	1996–97
Villa Aztecs/Aston Villa	1	1	2012–13
Sheffield	1	1	2013–14
Wimbledon	1	-	1994–95
Sunderland	1	-	2011–12
Southampton	1	-	2021–22
Hashtag United	1	-	2023–24
AFC Bournemouth	1	-	2025-26
Doncaster Belles/ Doncaster Rovers Belles	-	3	
Cardiff City	-	2	
Knowsley United	-	1	
Birmingham City	-	1	
Tranmere Rovers	-	1	
Leicester City	-	1	
Crawley Wasps	-	1	
Huddersfield Town	-	1	
Watford	-	1	
Newcastle United	-	1	
Stoke City	-	1	
Plymouth Argyle	-	1	

== See also ==
- FA Women's National League Plate
- FA Women's National League
- Women's FA Cup
