= Sophie Perry =

Irish footballer (born 1986)

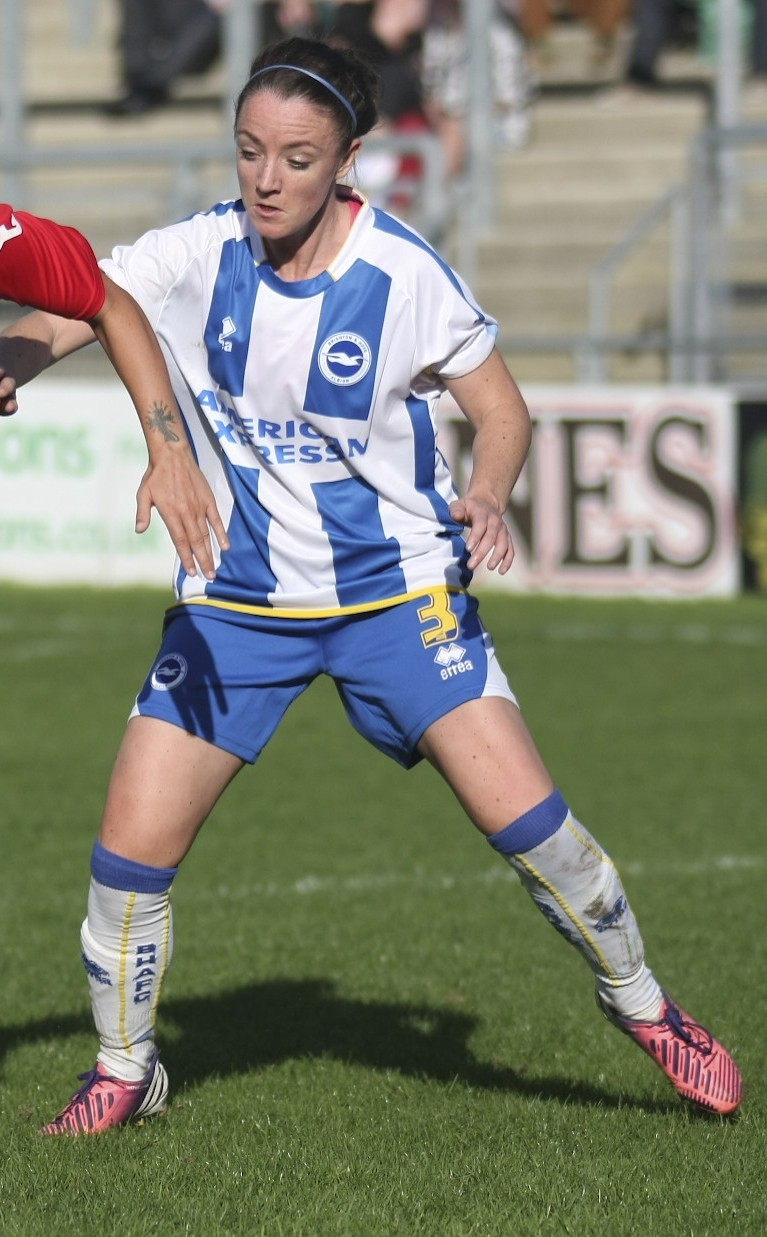
- Perry with Brighton & Hove Albion in 2013

Personal information
- Full name: Sophie Marie Perry
- Date of birth: 11 November 1986 (age 39)
- Place of birth: Brighton, England
- Height: 1.68 m (5 ft 6 in)
- Position: Full-back

Team information
- Current team: Chonburi

Youth career
- Hove Park Rangers Girls

Senior career*
Years	Team	Apps	(Gls)
–2005	Brighton & Hove Albion		
2005–2012	Chelsea	124	(6)
2011	→ Brighton & Hove Albion (loan)		
2013–2016	Brighton & Hove Albion		
2016	Reading	4	(0)
2017–2019	Brighton & Hove Albion	20	(2)
2019	→ Lewes (loan)	3	(0)
2020–2023	Chonburi		

International career^{‡}
2008	England U23		
2012–2018	Republic of Ireland	30	(0)
- * Club domestic league appearances and goals ‡ National team caps and goals as of 28 December 2018 (UTC)

Sophie Marie Perry (born 11 November 1986) is a former footballer who played as a full back for Thai Women's League club Chonburi FC, Reading, Brighton & Hove Albion, Chelsea and Millwall. She has represented England (where she was born) and the Republic of Ireland at under-23 and senior international levels, respectively.

== Club career ==
Perry started her career at Brighton & Hove Albion before moving to Chelsea. She joined Reading in July 2016.

In January 2017, Perry rejoined Brighton & Hove Albion. In January 2019, she joined Championship club Lewes on loan for the remainder of the 2018–19 season.

Perry accepted a job as a PE teacher at St. Andrews International School, Green Valley in summer 2019, bringing her professional playing career to an end. She set up a girls' football academy in Thailand. In September 2020, Perry signed with Thai Women's League champions Chonburi F.C.

== International career ==
In February 2012 Perry received her first call-up to the senior Republic of Ireland squad, for the 2012 Algarve Cup. She made her debut with the Irish national team against Wales at the second game of the Algarve Cup on 3 March 2012. The match finished in a 0–0 draw.

In July 2013 Perry played for Ireland at the Summer Universiade in Kazan.
