= Michelle Green =

Welsh footballer (born 1982)

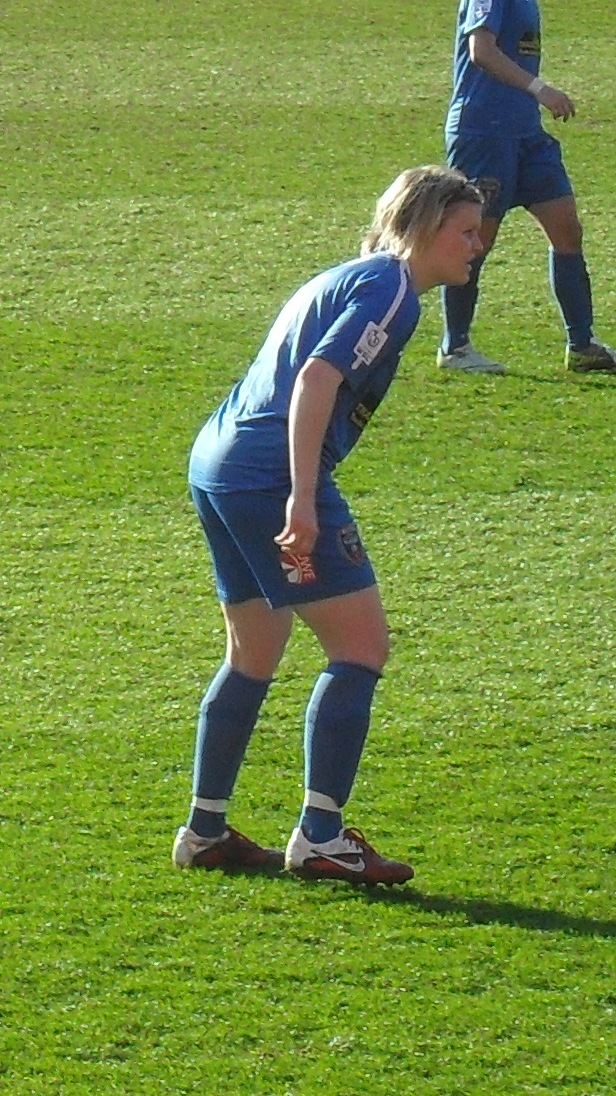

Personal information
- Full name: Michelle Emma Green
- Date of birth: 18 December 1982 (age 43)
- Place of birth: Neath, Wales
- Position: Midfielder

Team information
- Current team: Cardiff City

Youth career
- BP
- Mountain Ash

Senior career*
Years	Team	Apps	(Gls)
- Newport Strikers
- Newport County
- Merthyr Tydfil
2003–2012	Bristol Academy		
2012–	Cardiff City Ladies		

International career^{‡}
	Wales U-16	7	
	Wales U-18	11	(4)
2001–	Wales	92	(5)
- * Club domestic league appearances and goals ‡ National team caps and goals as of 21 June 2014 (UTC)

Michelle Emma Green (born 18 December 1982) is a footballer who plays for the Welsh national team and Cardiff City. Green plays as a central midfielder and has accumulated over 90 caps for Wales.

== Club career ==
Green played for BP, Mountain Ash, Newport Strikers, Newport County and Merthyr Tydfil prior to joining Bristol Rovers in 2003. The club changed its name to Bristol Academy two years later. Commuting from Neath, she scored four Premier League goals in her first season and one the next, in the derby against Bristol City. In May 2008 The Observer newspaper described Green as the club's star player. At the end of the following season she was injured, which restricted her appearances during the opening part of 2009–10.

Green previously captained the Gas Girls until the armband passed to Grace McCatty. Her nickname at the club is "Mush".

== International career ==
Green won seven caps for Wales at U16 level and scored four goals in 11 games for the U18 team. At the age of 18 she made her senior debut in a 5–1 defeat to Scotland in October 2001.

In June 2014 she played her 92nd senior international equalling the men's Welsh record of Neville Southall.
