= Pilar García (footballer) =

Spanish footballer (born 1990)

Personal information
- Full name: María Pilar García Villalba
- Date of birth: 21 July 1990 (age 36)
- Place of birth: Madrid, Spain
- Height: 1.61 m (5 ft 3 in)
- Position: Midfielder

Team information
- Current team: Rayo Vallecano
- Number: 4

Senior career*
Years	Team	Apps	(Gls)
2006–2010	Atlético Madrid	92	(9)
2010–2014	Rayo Vallecano	97	(18)
2014–2016	Keynsham Town		
2016–2017	Atlético Madrid	9	(0)
2017–	Rayo Vallecano	134	(6)
- * Club domestic league appearances and goals as of 13:40, 28 May 2022 (UTC)

María Pilar García Villalba (born 21 July 1990) is a Spanish footballer who plays as a midfielder for Rayo Vallecano.

== Club career ==
García started her career at Atlético Madrid.
