= Sheffield F.C. Women =

Coordinates: 53.309814°N 1.47839°W

Sheffield F.C. Ladies
- Full name: Sheffield Football Club Ladies
- Nickname: The Club
- Founded: 2003; 23 years ago
- Ground: Home of Football Ground, Dronfield
- Capacity: 2,209
- Chairman: Jon McClure
- CEO: Alexis Krachai
- Head coaches: Dan O’Hearne and Martin Powell
- League: FA Women's National League Division One Midlands
- 2025–26: FA Women's National League Division One Midlands, 6th of 12
- Website: sheffieldfc.com/womens
Home colours	Away colours

Sheffield Football Club Ladies is an English women's football club affiliated with Sheffield F.C. The club won the FA Women's Premier League Northern Division in 2014–15 and the following promotion play-off and is the first club to earn promotion to the FA WSL 2.

The team was founded in 2003 and started at the lowest level of the league pyramid back then.

== History ==
Sheffield FC Ladies was formed in 2003 when previous team Norton Ladies affiliated with the oldest football club in the world, Sheffield FC.

In 2009–10, Sheffield lived up to their pre-season billing as title contenders and ultimately won the Division One East of the Yorkshire & Humberside League, the bottom level of the women's pyramid of football at the time until the formation of the County Leagues, thanks to a 3–2 victory in a title-deciding night match against runners up Barnsley at home in front of 150 supporters. The experience of losing a similar contest the season before proved invaluable as the team showed great experience to get the result they needed to lift their second League trophy. The team also reached the semi-finals of the Sheffield & Hallamshire County Cup for the second time, losing in extra time to Rotherham United.

In the 2010-11 season of the Northern Combination WFL, Sheffield recorded 18 wins and two defeats, securing the league title on their first attempt and finishing 11 points clear of runners up Sheffield Wednesday. A third league title in four years meant Sheffield FC Ladies were promoted to the FA Women's Premier League for 2011–12.

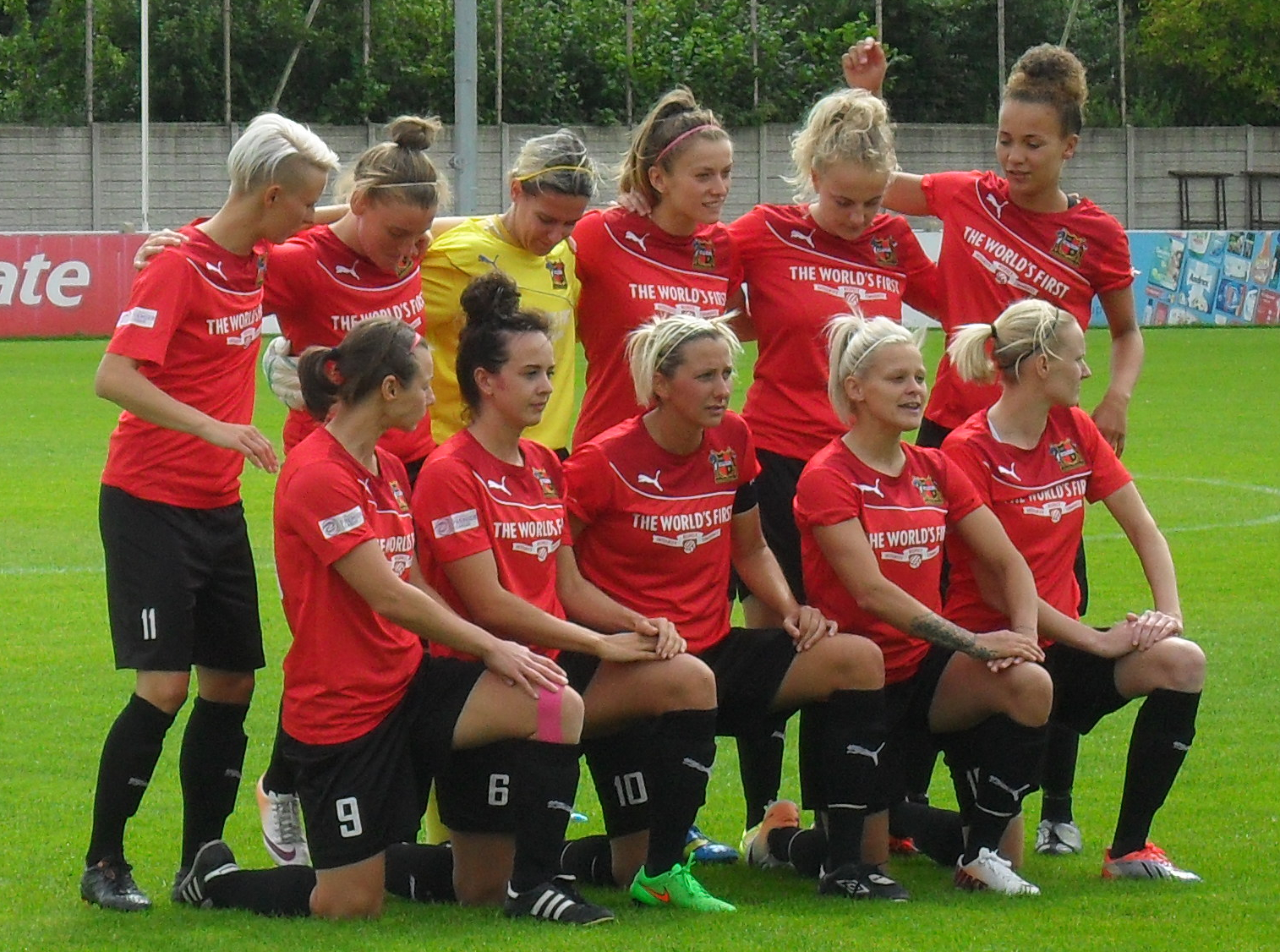
Sheffield LFC in August 2015

Sheffield's debut season at FA WPL level could hardly have gone much better as Sheffield finished the year as runners up, five points behind champions Manchester City. The team picked up silverware for the third season running, this time courtesy of a first win in the Sheffield & Hallamshire County Cup. The team also enjoyed their best run in the FA Women's Cup, reaching the Fourth Round Proper.

The first team went one better in 2012–13 as they lifted the FA WPL Northern Division title for the first time, crowning an incredible rise through the ranks of the women's game. Sheffield were front runners from the start of the season, losing just one league match in total, and finishing nine points clear of Nottingham Forest. They also repeated their success in the County Cup, beating Rotherham United in the final.

In 2014–15, the team won the FA WPL Northern Division for a third year in a row. Because the FA WSL introduced promotion, a play-off between both division champions was held. Sheffield beat Portsmouth 1–0 and became the first team to earn promotion to the WSL 2.

After the 2017–18 season the club had to withdraw from the second level league for financial reasons.

In the 2021-2022 season, the club were relegated from the FA Women's National League Northern Premier Division after completing the first full season on the return after the Covid 19. The club finished in bottom place (13th). Sheffield FC were joined by Hull City and Middlesbrough finishing 12th and 11th respectably.

2022-2023 saw the appointment of John Bennett as manager finishing 8th place in the FAWNL Division 1 Midlands.

The 2023-2024 season saw the club relegated from the FA Women's National League after finishing 11th in Midlands Division 1. The club had three management changes during the season.

In October 2024, Graham Abercrombie was appointed manager for a second spell at the club, however resigned from the position in April 2026.

The club won the East Midlands Regional Premier Division securing their first trophy in 10 years and confirmed promotion back to the FA Women's National League on the clubs first attempt.

== Stadium ==
Sheffield Ladies are based at the Home of Football in Dronfield, Derbyshire.

== Honours ==
- FA Women's Premier League:
  - Championship Play Off Final Winners: 2014–15
- FA Women's Premier League:
  - Northern Division Winners: 2012–13, 2013–14, 2014–15
- FA Women's Premier League Cup:
  - Winners: 2013–14
- Northern Combination Women's Football League:
  - Winners: 2010–11
- North East Regional Women's Football League:
  - Premier Division Winners: 2009–10
  - Division 1 (South) Winners: 2007–08
- Sheffield & Hallamshire County Women's Challenge Cup:
  - Winners: 2011–12, 2012–13, 2013–14, 2014–15
