= West Bromwich Albion F.C. Women =

English women's association football club

West Bromwich Albion Women
- Full name: West Bromwich Albion Football Club Women
- Short name: WBA
- Founded: 1989 (as West Bromwich Albion Womens F.C.)
- Ground: Alexander Stadium
- Capacity: 18,000
- Manager: Charlie Fripp (interim); Siobhan Hodgetts-Still (maternity leave)
- League: FA Women's National League North
- 2025–26: FA Women's National League North, 6th of 12
- Website: https://www.wba.co.uk/news/womens-team
Home colours	Away colours	Third colours

West Bromwich Albion Football Club Women is an English women's football club affiliated with West Bromwich Albion F.C. The first team currently plays in the FA Women's National League North. In 2010–11, the then named Sporting Club Albion won the Midland Combination Women's Football League promoting them to the FA Women's Premier League.

The club is also closely affiliated with West Bromwich Albion Girls Regional Talent Centre, with the objective of bringing through Youth Players into the first team, as well as the Disability Sports Club and Basketball clubs.

The club appointed manager Siobhan Hodgetts-Still in June 2023, and made her position full-time in February 2025 as part of a broader commitment to bring the Women's side into the club proper.

== History ==
=== Early years (1989–2008) ===
The club was founded as West Bromwich Albion Women's F.C. in 1989 playing local and recreational football. In 1995 they joined the Midland Combination Women's Football League, but was not part of West Bromwich Albion F.C. In the 2004–05 season they were incorporated in the WBA Community Programme and committed to developing youth players. They continued in this way for four more seasons.

=== The Albion Foundation (2009–2011) ===
In 2009 the club was part of The Albion Foundation and was incorporated into Sporting Club Albion, alongside the Basketball and Disabled Sports teams. Their second season in this format saw them win the Midlands Combination Women's Football League title and gain promotion the FA Women's Premier League in the process. In the summer of 2011 the announcement of the Girls Centre of Excellence brought new promise of improvement in the development of young players.

=== Recent years (2012–present) ===
Since 2012, the club has stabilised their position in the Premier League Northern Division.

In the 2015/16 season under the leadership of manager Graham Abercrombie, the club achieved a league and cup double winning both the FA Women's Premier League Northern Division and the Birmingham Ladies County Cup. They narrowly missed out on promotion to the FA Women's Super League Division 2, losing 4–2 in a playoff with FA Women's Premier League Southern Division champions Brighton & Hove Albion W.F.C. They also made it to the quarter finals of the FA Women's Cup, losing 2–0 to Super League side Manchester City W.F.C.

For the 2016–17 season, the club reverted to the West Bromwich Albion name where they had another successful campaign winning the Birmingham Ladies County Cup for a second year running under new manager Craig Nicholls.

In the 2017–2018 season, the club appointed Louis Sowe as new manager, but despite reaching the Birmingham Ladies County Cup Semi-Final, they suffered relegation to the newly named FA Women's National League Midlands Division One.

In the 2021-2022 season, the club appointed Jenny Sugarman as the new head coach. Sugarman guided West Brom to the Birmingham County Cup final where they played Wolverhampton Wanderers at Walsall FC and finished 8th in the league.

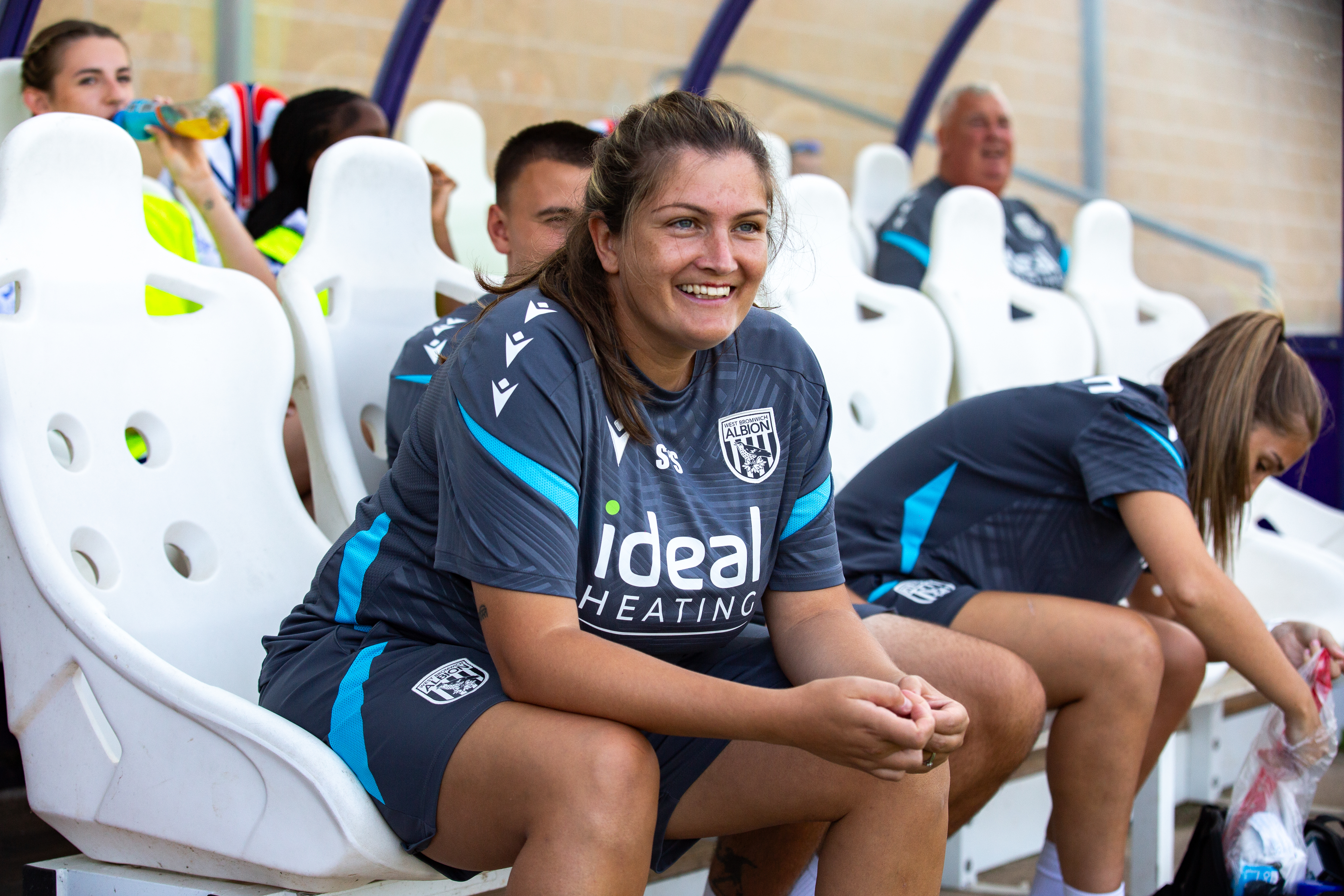
Hodgetts-Still pictured in the dugout for the 2025/26 WNL season opener away at Loughborough Lightning.

Following Sugarman's departure in June 2023, West Bromwich Albion appointed coach Siobhan Hodgetts (later Hodgetts-Still) as Head Coach of the Women's team. Hodgetts had been a coach with The Albion Foundation since 2004 and played for West Bromwich Albion Women between 2005 and 2014.

The side finished 9th in the Women’s National League Northern Premier Division in 2023/24 and climbed to 7th in the 2024/25 season, but impressively won the Birmingham County FA Challenge Cup in April 2025 with a resounding 6-2 win against Rugby Borough at the Poundland Bescot Stadium in Walsall, earning Hodgetts-Still her first silverware as the Women's First Team manager and West Bromwich Albion their first trophy since last lifting the Challenge Cup in 2017.

Ahead of the 2026-27 season, the club announved Hdgetts-Still would be taking a period of maternity leave, with Martyn Irvine appointed as interim manager for the duration.

== Colours and badge ==
Their kits are identical to those of West Bromwich Albion F.C. with navy blue shorts instead of white.

== Stadium ==
As of the 2025/26 season, West Bromwich Albion Women will play home games at the Alexander Stadium in Perry Barr, Birmingham, having moved from The Valley Stadium in Redditch which the team had used for two previous seasons. They occasionally play home matches at The Hawthorns, typically making 2-3 appearances per season.

== Players ==
=== Current squad ===
As of July 2026

Note: Flags indicate national team as defined under FIFA eligibility rules; some limited exceptions apply. Players may hold more than one non-FIFA nationality.

No.	Pos.	Nation	Player
1	GK	ENG	Charlotte Clarke
2	DF	WAL	Taylor Reynolds
3	DF	ENG	Hannah George
5	DF	ENG	Zoe Creaney
6	DF	ENG	Isabel Green
7	FW	ENG	Simran Jhamat
9	FW	WAL	Rhianne Oakley
10	MF	ENG	Olivia Rabjohn (Captain)
11	FW	ENG	Marli Rhodes-Andrews
12	FW	ENG	Asiah Janny
13	GK	WAL	Orla Howard
14	FW	ENG	Ellie May

No.	Pos.	Nation	Player
16	DF	ENG	Naomi Sharp
17	FW	ENG	Amya Hammond-McLean
18	DF	ENG	Ruby Heselden
19	MF	ENG	Monique Robinson
20	MF	IRL	Phoebe Warner
22	MF	ENG	Kate Evans
23	GK	ENG	Lavarna Johnson
24	DF	NIR	Ella Haughey
39	MF	CAY	Molly Kehoe
—	DF	ENG	Ellie McFarlane
—	FW	ENG	Chidubem Arinze
—	FW	ENG	Lucy Davies
—	FW	ENG	Renaye Best
—	FW	IRL	Tara Kirk

=== Out on loan ===
Note: Flags indicate national team as defined under FIFA eligibility rules; some limited exceptions apply. Players may hold more than one non-FIFA nationality.

No.	Pos.	Nation	Player

== Coaching staff ==
Name	Role
Siobhan Hodgetts-Still	Head Coach
Charlie Fripp	Coach
Rob Elliott	Goalkeeping Coach
Charlotte Wear	Physiotherapist
Jacob Parsonage	Fitness Coach & Sports Science

== Records ==
- Best FA Cup performance: Fifth round, 2016–17, 2021–22

== Honours ==
Midland Combination Women's Football League

- Champions 2010–11

FA Women's Premier League Northern Division

- Champions 2015–16 (As Sporting Club Albion Ladies)

Birmingham County FA Challenge Cup

- Runners up 2014–15, 2021–22
- Winners 2015–16, 2016–17, 2024–25
