= Gwalia United F.C. =

Women's football club in Cardiff, Wales

Coordinates: 51°28′36.7″N 3°09′24.5″W

Gwalia United
- Founded: 1975; 51 years ago, as Llanedeyrn LFC
- Stadium: USW Sports Park, Treforest
- Capacity: 1,000
- Owner(s): Julian Jenkins & Damien Singh
- Club Chairwoman: Michele Adams MBE
- Manager: Cori Williams-Mills
- League: FA Women's National League South
- 2025–26: FA Women's National League South, 11th of 12 (relegated)
- Website: gwaliaunited.com
Home colours	Away colours	Third colours

Gwalia United Football Club (Welsh: Clwb Pêl-droed Gwalia Unedig) is a Welsh women's football club playing in the FAWNL Division One South West. The club was renamed Gwalia United prior to the start of the 2024–25 season. Prior to this, the club was most recently called Cardiff City Ladies F.C. but has also played as Llanedeyrn L.F.C., Inter Cardiff F.C. and Cardiff County L.F.C.

== History ==
The club was founded in 1975 as Llanedeyrn L.F.C. after a local charity match. In 1981 the name was changed to Cardiff L.F.C., and in 1993 the club linked up with Inter Cardiff F.C. and started playing at the Cardiff Athletic Stadium. In 1997 the connection with Inter Cardiff was terminated and the club changed its name to Cardiff County L.F.C. while affiliating with the Cardiff County Council. In 2001 the club began affiliating with Cardiff City, the professional men’s club from the same city.

At the beginning of the 2003 season, however, the club severed its connection with its male counterpart when its members voted against the men’s club's proposals and its operations became an independent outfit again. Although they were allowed to keep use of the Cardiff City name and kit colours, their crest was altered to incorporate the Welsh red dragon.

In 2006 Cardiff City Ladies won the FA Women's Premier League Southern Division and were promoted to the National Division for the first time. Relegated in the 2007–08 season, the club again were promoted to the National Division in 2010–11.

In the 2021–22 season, Cardiff City Ladies were relegated from the FA Women's Premier League Southern Division, but earned promotion back the following season.

In August 2023, still under the Cardiff City Ladies name, the club outlined a new strategy aimed at improving infrastructure, visibility, and competitive standards within women's football. BBC Sport reported that the plan included investment in performance analysis, medical provision, and partnerships such as with the University of South Wales.

On 1 March 2024, the club announced it would rebrand as Gwalia United ahead of the 2024–25 season. The new name, derived from an ancient Welsh term for Wales, was chosen to reflect cultural heritage and the club's ambitions within the domestic game. Founded in 1975, the club had previously produced more than 100 senior internationals, and the rebranding was presented as part of a wider vision centred on unity, heritage, resilience, and inclusion.

== Partnership with University of South Wales ==
In August 2025, Gwalia United announced a partnership with the University of South Wales, under which the club's senior women's team would train and play home matches at the USW Sport Park in Treforest.

== Dragons Training Centre ==
In 2022 the club opened their youth training centre for girls aged 6–16.

The Dragons Training Centre uses the Soccer Profile to measure and track players' progress, enabling them to develop their technical skills. The sessions run at the centre are open to all players regardless of team affiliation or ability.

The centre is based at the FAW facility, Amdani Hi @ Ocean Way. This is a pioneering hub for women's and girls' football, funded by the FAW.

== Ownership and Coaching Structure ==
Role	Name
Owners	Julian Jenkins; Damien Singh
Club Chair	Michele Adams MBE
Club Secretary	Karen Jones MBE
First Team Manager	Cori Williams-Mills
Assistant Coach	Keehlan Panayiotou
Goalkeeping Coach	Jamie Lloyd Davies

== First-team squad ==
As of May 2026

Note: Flags indicate national team as defined under FIFA eligibility rules; some limited exceptions apply. Players may hold more than one non-FIFA nationality.

No.	Pos.	Nation	Player
1	GK	WAL	Laura O'Sullivan-Jones
2	DF	WAL	Ellie-Mai Sanford
3	FW	WAL	Tia Asker
4	MF	ENG	Katie Quick
6	DF	WAL	Dannielle Broadhurst
7	FW	WAL	Bonnie Gready
8	MF	WAL	Beth McGowan
9	FW	WAL	Eliza Collie
10	FW	WAL	Georgia Walters
11	FW	WAL	Jessie Taylor
12	FW	WAL	Cori Williams-Mills
13	DF	WAL	Amina Vine
14	FW	CAY	Molly Kehoe
15	DF	WAL	Shurima Vine
16	MF	WAL	Emma Thomas
17	DF	WAL	Daisy Ackerman
18	MF	WAL	Manon Pearce
19	DF	WAL	Callie Jones
20	FW	WAL	Anna Powell
21	GK	WAL	Emily McGrogan
22	MF	WAL	Imi Scourfield
23	MF	WAL	Cerys Jones
25	MF	WAL	Keira O'Keefe
26	GK	NOR	Benedicte Haaland
31	GK	WAL	Ameliah Yarwood

== Honours ==
- Welsh Women's Cup (11): 1995, 2003 to 2010, 2012, 2013, 2016

== Record in UEFA competitions ==
- 2003–04: first qualifying round, 4th
- 2004–05: first qualifying round, 4th
- 2005–06: first qualifying round, 3rd
- 2006–07: first qualifying round, 2nd
- 2007–08: first qualifying round, 4th
- 2008–09: first qualifying round, 4th
- 2009–10: qualifying round, 3rd
