= 2023–24 Women's FA Cup =

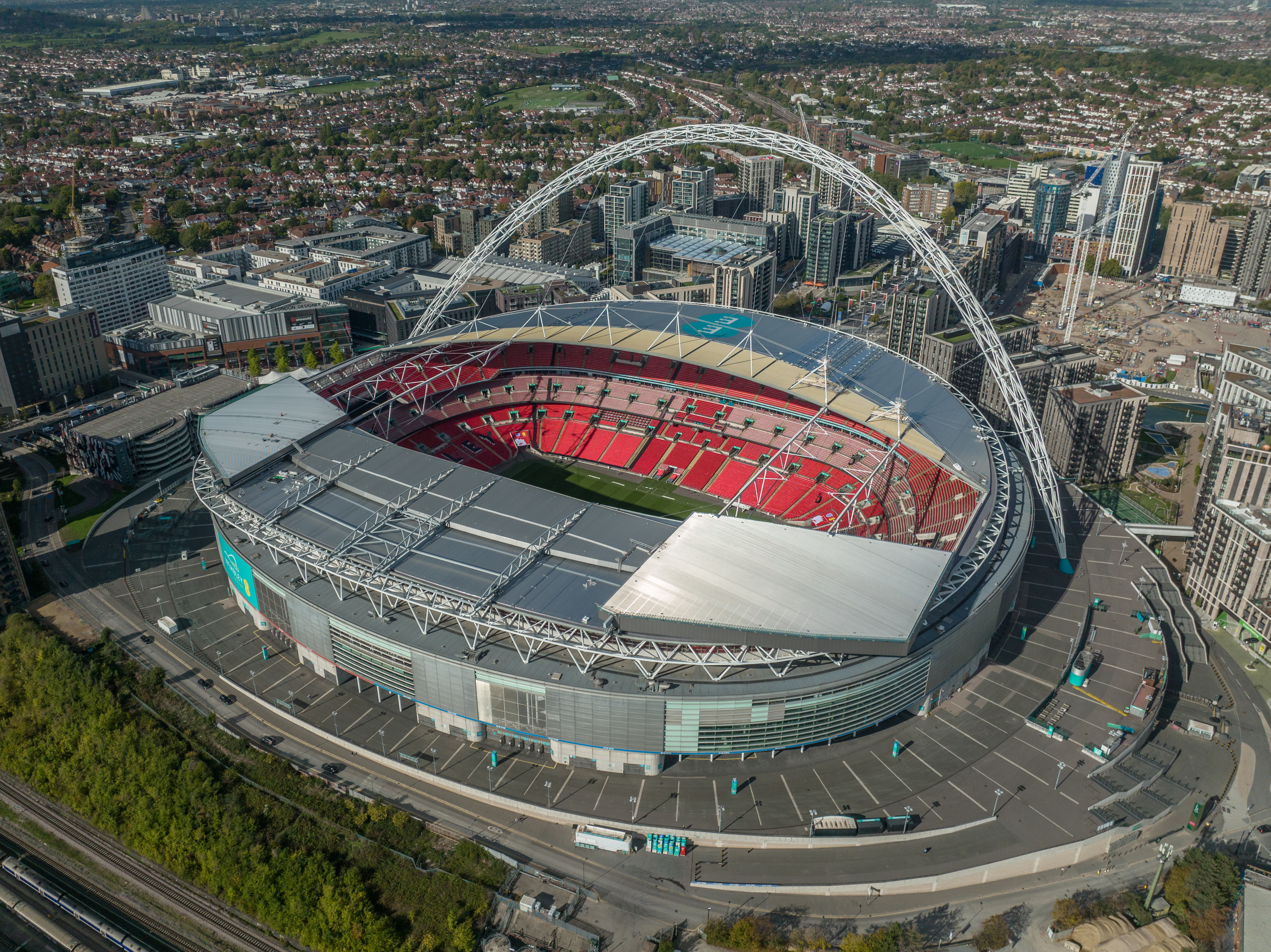
- Wembley Stadium hosted the final on 12 May 2024

Tournament details
- Country: England; Wales
- Dates: 12 November 2023 – 12 May 2024
- Teams: 456

Final positions
- Champions: Manchester United (1st title)
- Runners-up: Tottenham Hotspur

Tournament statistics
- Matches played: 427
- Goals scored: 2,266 (5.31 per match)
- Top goal scorer(s): Natasha Leach (Arnold Eagles); 15 goals

The 2023–24 Women's FA Cup was the 54th staging of the Women's FA Cup, a knockout cup competition for women's football teams in England. Chelsea were the defending champions, having beaten Manchester United 1–0 in the 2023 final on 14 May 2023.

Manchester United won their first major trophy by beating Tottenham Hotspur 4–0 in the final.

== Teams ==
A total of 456 teams were accepted into the 2023–24 Women's FA Cup, an increase of 18 from the previous year. Exemptions remained the same from the previous season: 90 tier 5 teams are given an exemption for the first qualifying round, entering at the second round qualifying stage. The 48 teams that play in the FA Women's National League Division One (tier 4) are given exemption until third round qualifying, while teams in the Northern and Southern Premier Divisions (tier 3) will enter at the first round proper. The 12 Women's Championship teams (tier 2) are exempt until the third round proper, while the final teams to enter the competition will be the 12 Women's Super League teams (tier 1) which remain exempt until the fourth round proper.

Round	Clubs remaining	Clubs involved	Winners from previous round	Games played	Goals scored	Prize money	
Round	Clubs remaining	Clubs involved	Winners from previous round	Games played	Goals scored	Winner	Loser
First round qualifying	456	208	–	96	577	£1,800	£450
Second round qualifying	352	256 (Note: 90 Tier 5 regional premier division teams added)	104	122	659	£3,000	£750
Third round qualifying	224	176 (Note: 48 FA Women's National League Division One teams added)	128	88	450	£4,000	£1,000
First round	136	112 (Note: 24 FA Women's National League Premier Division teams added)	88	56	286	£6,000	£1,500
Second round	80	56	56	28	129	£8,000	£2,000
Third round	52	40 (Note: 12 Women's Championship teams added)	28	20	95	£35,000	£9,000
Fourth round	32	32 (Note: 12 Women's Super League teams added)	20	16	66	£54,000	£13,000
Fifth round	16	16	16	8	30	£80,000	£20,000
Quarter-final	8	8	8	4	9	£90,000	£22,500
Semi-final	4	4	4	2	6	£160,000	£40,000
Final	2	2	2	1	4	£430,000	£108,000

== First round qualifying ==
The competition started at the first round qualifying stage with games originally scheduled to be played on 10 September 2023, and made up of teams from outside the top five tiers of the women's football pyramid.

Tie	Home team (tier)	Score	Away team (tier)	Att.
1	Guisborough Town (7)	5–2	Chester-Le-Street United (6)	
2	Prudhoe Town (7)	1–3	Bishop Auckland (6)	95
3	CLS Amazons (7)	2–3	Ripon City (6)	
4	Bedlington Belles (7)	3–5	Darlington (7)	
5	Cramlington United (7)	0–5	Hebburn Town (7)	78
6	Gateshead Rutherford (7)	0–1	Thornaby (6)	
7	Carlisle United (6)	1–3	Hartlepool Pools Youth (6)	
8	Horden CW (7)	3–1	West Allotment (7)	
9	Northallerton Town (7)	A–W	Washington (6)	
Northallerton Town withdrew.
10	Gateshead Leam Rangers (7)	1–1 (0-3 p)	Birtley Town (7)	
11	Poppleton (7)	0–14	Leeds Modernians (7)	
12	Morley Town (7)	4–2	Beverley Town (7)	
13	Handsworth (6)	9–0	Grimsby Borough (6)	114
14	Silsden (7)	2–3	Dronfield Town (6)	
15	Cleethorpes Town (7)	2–0	Harworth Colliery (6)	165
16	Kiveton Park (7)	3–0	Sheffield Wednesday (7)	
17	Brunsmeer Athletic (7)	5–3	Gainsborough Trinity (6)	
18	Retford (6)	6–0	Market Rasen Town (7)	80
19	Lower Hopton (6)	1–2	York Railway Institute (6)	
20	Altofts (6)	3–3 (3-4 p)	Farsley Celtic Juniors (6)	
21	Oughtibridge War Memorial (6)	5–1	Bradford Park Avenue (6)	
22	Preston North End (6)	3–1	Altrincham (6)	
23	FC St Helens (6)	6–2	Litherland REMYCA (6)	
24	Rochdale (7)	2–1	MSB Woolton (7)	
25	Mancunian Unity (6)	6–5	Mossley Hill (6)	
26	Sir Tom Finney (7)	1–21	Poulton Victoria (6)	
27	Bolton Wanderers (6)	3–1	Macclesfield (7)	
28	Nantwich Town (7)	1–1 (3-4 p)	Chester (6)	
29	Clitheroe Wolves (7)	3–3 (4-5 p)	Pilkington (7)	
30	Penwortham Town (6)	0–9	Wigan Athletic (7)	
31	Radcliffe (6)	3–1	Atherton LR (7)	
32	Ruston Sports (7)	0–7	Kettering Town (6)	
33	Peterborough Sports (7)	A–W	Thrapston Town (6)	
Peterborough Sports withdrew.
34	Loughborough Foxes Vixens (6)	1–3	Yaxley Phoenix (6)	64
35	Sherwood (6)	2–0	Moulton (7)	
36	Wyberton Wildcats (7)	4–2	Newark Town (6)	
37	Coalville Town (7)	6–8	Leicester City Ladies (6)	
38	Nottingham Trent University (6)	4–1	HBW United (7)	31
39	Rugby Town (6)	0–1	Skegness Town (6)	
40	Kettering (7)	1–5	Long Buckby (7)	
41	Sleaford United (6)	0–32	Arnold Eagles (6)	
42	AFC Rushden & Diamonds (7)	11–1	Sleaford Town Rangers (7)	194
43	Whitchurch Alport (7)	4–3	Borrowash Victoria (7)	
44	AFC Telford United (6)	2–0	Bewdley Town (6)	
45	Droitwich Spa (6)	2–5	Leamington Lions (6)	147
46	Port Vale (6)	2–1	Coventry City (6)	
47	Bromsgrove Sporting (7)	1–1 (3-1 p)	Sedgley & Gornal United (6)	
48	Wyrley (7)	A–W	Hednesford Town (7)	
Wyrley withdrew.
49	Nuneaton Borough (6)	3–1	Pride Park (7)	203
50	Hereford Pegasus (6)	4–3	Redditch United (6)	
51	Histon (7)	1–6	Lawford (6)	
52	Newmarket Town (6)	6–1	St Ives Town (6)	
53	Fakenham Town (6)	H–W	Brett Vale (7)	
Brett Vale withdrew.

Tie	Home team (tier)	Score	Away team (tier)	Att.
54	Thetford Town (7)	11–0	Cambridge Rangers (7)	
55	East Bergholt United (6)	A–W	Mulbarton Wanderers (7)	
East Bergholt United withdrew.
56	Fulbourn Bluebirds (7)	1–3	Dussindale & Helesdon (7)	
57	Long Stratton (7)	2–3	Brantham Athletic (7)	
58	Holland (7)	0–5	Southend United Community SC (7)	
59	Hertford Town (7)	2–0	Stotfold (6)	
60	Wormley Rovers (6)	1–1 (2-4 p)	Frontiers (7)	
61	Harpenden Town (6)	3–2	Stanway Pegasus (7)	
62	Clapton Community (6)	14–0	St Margaretsbury (6)	208
63	Hitchin Belles (6)	2–2 (4-5 p)	Hackney (6)	
64	Grays Athletic (6)	2–1	Chelmsford City (7)	
65	Leyton Orient (7)	4–2	Cheshunt (6)	358
66	Colney Heath (6)	1–3	Wootton Blue Cross Lionesses (6)	
67	Bexhill United (6)	3–3 (5-3 p)	Comets (7)	
68	Camden Town (7)	3–2	Hastings United (6)	
69	Croydon (7)	2–2 (5-4 p)	Hammersmith (7)	
70	Glebe (7)	0–5	Bromleians (7)	
71	Bromley (6)	8–1	Sevenoaks Town (7)	
72	Herne Bay (6)	3–3 (3-2 p)	XL Football (7)	
73	Margate (7)	6–0	Maidstone United (7)	
74	Headstone Manor (7)	1–0	Tilehurst Panthers (7)	80
75	Mortimer (7)	A–W	Long Crendon (6)	
Mortimer withdrew.
76	New Bradwell St Peter (6)	3–0	Milton United (6)	80
77	Caversham United (6)	1–3	Camden & Islington United (6)	
78	Brentford (6)	4–0	Ruislip Rangers (7)	234
79	Watford Ladies Development (6)	3–0	Penn & Tylers Green (7)	
80	Haddenham (7)	2–5	Slough Town (7)	
81	Newport Pagnell Town (7)	4–0	Brackley Town (7)	
82	Ashmount Leigh (6)	4–2	Newhaven (6)	
83	Woking (7)	2–3	Leatherhead (7)	
84	Pagham (7)	0–4	Steyning Town Community (6)	50
85	Eastbourne United (6)	H–W	Hounslow (6)	
Hounslow withdrew.
86	Richmond & Kew (7)	3–2	Abbey Rangers (7)	
87	Basingstoke Town (7)	2–4	Weymouth (6)	
88	Fleet Town (7)	2–8	Shanklin (7)	107
89	Bemerton Heath Harlequins (7)	0–4	AFC Portchester (7)	
90	Shaftesbury (6)	3–2	Havant & Waterlooville (7)	
91	United Services Portsmouth (7)	3–3 (5-3 p)	Poole Town (6)	23
92	Gloucester City (7)	2–1	Cirencester Town (7)	142
93	Ilminster Town (6)	10–0	Bishops Cleeve (7)	
94	Downend Flyers (6)	5–3	FC Chippenham (7)	
95	Tuffley Rovers (7)	0–9	St Vallier (6)	37
96	SGS Olveston United (6)	6–1	Frome Town (6)	35
97	Mangotsfield United (6)	0–5	Yeovil Town (6)	
98	Longwell Green (7)	0–14	Royal Wootton Bassett Town (6)	
99	Middlezoy Rovers (6)	1–4	Paulton Rovers (6)	
100	Saltash Borough (7)	3–2	Westexe Park Rangers (7)	
101	Seaton Town (7)	1–7	Bideford (6)	
102	Bodmin (7)	2–2 (2-4 p)	Saltash United (7)	95
103	RNAS Culdrose (7)	0–7	Sticker (6)	35
104	Teignmouth (7)	H–W	Signal Box Frankfort (7)	
Signal Box Frankfort withdrew.

== Second round qualifying ==
The 128 matches of the second round qualifying were originally scheduled to be played on 1 October 2023. This round included the introduction of teams from the fifth-tier regional first division football leagues.

Tie	Home team (tier)	Score	Away team (tier)	Att.
1	Wallsend BC (5)	5–1	Bishop Auckland (6)	
2	Hartlepool Pools Youth (6)	1–0	Consett (6)	168
3	Guisborough Town (7)	4–0	Horden CW (7)	
4	Workington Reds (6)	4–5	Penrith (6)	150
5	Spennymoor Town (5)	1–0	Ponteland United (6)	
6	Darlington (7)	1–4	Sunderland West End (5)	
7	Thornaby (6)	1–2	Gateshead (6)	89
8	Washington (6)	0–1	Birtley Town (7)	
9	South Shields (5)	1–2	Alnwick Town (5)	242
10	Redcar Town (5)	8–0	Hebburn Town (7)	70
11	Ripon City (6)	2–9	Hartlepool United (5)	
12	Harrogate Town (5)	2–1	Morley Town (7)	
13	Brunsmeer Athletic (7)	5–0	Sheffield United Community (6)	
14	Leeds Modernians (7)	9–2	Retford (6)	
15	Brigg Town CIC (7)	1–3	Oughtibridge War Memorial (6)	112
16	Barnsley (5)	1–3	Ossett United (6)	
17	Dronfield Town (6)	0–2	Rotherham United (5)	
18	Kiveton Park (7)	1–3	St Joseph's Rockware of Worksop (6)	273
19	York Railway Institute (6)	2–1	Farsley Celtic Juniors (6)	
20	Hull United (5)	4–1	Bradford City (5)	
21	Wakefield (5)	12–0	Cleethorpes Town (7)	
22	Handsworth (6)	1–2	Chesterfield (5)	
23	Colne (7)	H–W	Merseyrail (5)	
Merseyrail withdrew.
24	Fleetwood Town Wrens (5)	4–8	Wythenshawe (6)	
25	Marine (7)	1–7	Wigan Athletic (7)	101
26	Bury (5)	3–2	Radcliffe (6)	528
27	Crewe Alexandra (5)	2–0	Preston North End (6)	126
28	Rochdale (7)	0–9	Darwen (5)	
29	Ashton Town Lionesses (7)	1–3	Blackpool Girls & Ladies (5)	75
30	Pilkington (7)	0–9	Tranmere Rovers (5)	
31	FC St Helens (6)	1–3	Mancunian Unity (6)	
32	Poulton Victoria (6)	2–0	Blackburn Community (5)	
33	Salford City Lionesses (5)	1–2	Bolton Wanderers (6)	
34	Warrington Wolves Foundation (6)	1–4	Chester (6)	
35	West Didsbury & Chorlton (5)	2–1	Hindley Juniors (6)	122
36	Cheadle Town Stingers (5)	2–0	Curzon Ashton (5)	65
37	Arnold Eagles (6)	2–1	Skegness Town (6)	
38	Long Buckby (7)	0–6	Basford United (5)	
39	Grimsby Town (5)	0–8	Lincoln City (5)	
40	Yaxley Phoenix (6)	0–11	Thrapston Town (6)	
41	Sherwood (6)	0–0 (2-4 p)	Beaumont Park (6)	
42	Bugbrooke St Michaels (7)	4–1	Allexton & New Parks (7)	55
43	Kirby Muxloe (7)	0–5	Wyberton Wildcats (7)	
44	Leicester City Ladies (6)	2–5	Anstey Nomads (5)	60
45	Dunton & Broughton United (5)	0–0 (6-5 p)	Ilkeston Town (5)	
46	Mansfield Town (5)	1–1 (3-2 p)	Kettering Town (6)	
47	Nottingham Trent University (6)	6–2	Long Eaton United (5)	40
48	AFC Rushden & Diamonds (7)	2–2 (3-2 p)	Cardea (6)	85
49	Shifnal Town (5)	2–4	Shrewsbury Town (5)	
50	Hednesford Town (7)	0–1	Leamington Lions (6)	
51	Nuneaton Borough (6)	1–3	Crusaders (5)	
52	Kidderminster Harriers (5)	3–0	Burton Albion (5)	
53	Lye Town (5)	6–1	Hereford Pegasus (6)	55
54	Kingfisher (6)	0–1	Inkberrow (7)	132
55	Long Itchington (6)	H–W	Ross Juniors (7)	
Ross Juniors withdrew.
56	Knowle (5)	3–3 (3-4 p)	Lichfield City (5)	70
57	Port Vale (6)	3–2	Redditch Borough (6)	
58	Solihull Sporting (5)	4–0	Whitchurch Alport (7)	
59	Coundon Court (5)	6–0	Bromsgrove Sporting (7)	
60	AFC Telford United (6)	0–5	Coventry Sphinx (5)	
61	Walsall Wood (6)	1–4	Worcester City (5)	
62	Needham Market (5)	6–0	Woodbridge Town (7)	
63	Newmarket Town (6)	1–7	Wroxham (5)	
64	Brantham Athletic (7)	H–W	Sprowston (7)	
Sprowston withdrew.

Tie	Home team (tier)	Score	Away team (tier)	Att.
65	Mulbarton Wanderers (7)	3–3 (5-6 p)	Dussindale & Helesdon (7)	
66	Bungay Town (7)	0–4	Lawford (6)	55
67	King's Lynn Town (5)	2–5	Fakenham Town (6)	
68	Thetford Town (7)	4–1	Aylsham (7)	
69	Biggleswade United (6)	0–2	Leyton Orient (7)	100
70	Wootton Blue Cross Lionesses (6)	2–5	Stevenage (5)	
71	Royston Town (5)	2–1	St Albans City (5)	234
72	Frontiers (7)	4–6	Hertford Town (7)	
73	Harpenden Town (6)	6–2	Toby (7)	
74	Islington Borough (7)	5–3	Stanway Rovers (7)	
75	Wodson Park (6)	3–2	Clapton Community (6)	55
76	Hackney (6)	2–9	Real Bedford (5)	
77	Bowers & Pitsea (5)	5–0	AFC Dunstable (5)	
78	Enfield Town (5)	8–2	Southend United Community SC (6)	60
79	Grays Athletic (6)	1–4	Luton Town (5)	
80	Langford (6)	4–2	Hutton (6)	
81	Ashford United (5)	0–2	Dartford (5)	
82	Bromley (6)	6–0	Welling United (6)	
83	Camden Town (7)	0–0 (3-4 p)	Sittingbourne (7)	84
84	Aylesford (5)	5–1	Croydon (7)	
85	Haringey Borough (5)	8–0	Bexhill United (6)	
86	Margate (7)	7–1	Bromleians (7)	
87	Regents Park Rangers (7)	0–11	Millwall Lionesses (5)	
88	Herne Bay (6)	1–5	Ebbsfleet United (5)	
89	Barking (5)	0–6	Dulwich Hamlet (5)	150
90	Ascot United (5)	0–1	Wycombe Wanderers (5)	74
91	Headstone Manor (7)	2–0	Camden & Islington United (6)	
92	Sport London e Benfica (6)	4–2	Newport Pagnell Town (6)	
93	New Bradwell St Peter (6)	0–1	Denham United (6)	
94	Brentford (6)	H–W	Abingdon Town (5)	
Abingdon Town withdrew.
95	Buckingham United (6)	0–8	Woodley United (5)	
96	Slough Town (7)	0–9	Oxford City (5)	
97	Long Crendon (6)	2–6	Watford Ladies Development (6)	
98	Saltdean United (5)	1–0	Dorking Wanderers (5)	
99	Leatherhead (7)	2–4	Sutton United (5)	
100	AFC Whyteleafe (6)	4–3	Badshot Lea (5)	
101	Richmond & Kew (7)	3–0	Richmond Park (6)	
102	Crawley (5)	1 –1 (1-2 p)	Ashmount Leigh (6)	
103	Fulham (5)	16–0	Steyning Town Community (6)	
104	Eastbourne United (6)	0–2	Montpelier Villa (6)	
105	Warminster Town (5)	0–8	Bournemouth Sports (5)	
106	Shanklin (7)	2–6	Winchester City Flyers (5)	
107	AFC Stoneham (6)	8–0	Rushmoor Community (6)	
108	United Services Portsmouth (7)	8–0	Longham (7)	52
109	Sherborne Town (5)	4–0	Weymouth (6)	
110	Eastleigh In The Community (5)	0–1	AFC Portchester (7)	150
111	Shaftesbury (6)	1–1 (1-4 p)	QK Southampton (7)	
112	Ilminster Town (6)	H–W	Larkhall Athletic (5)	
Larkhall Athletic withdrew.
113	AEK Boco (6)	8–0	Dursley Town (7)	
114	Pen Mill (6)	A–W	Forest Green Rovers (5)	
Pen Mill withdrew.
115	Stockwood Wanderers (6)	2–7	Royal Wootton Bassett Town (6)	
116	Downend Flyers (6)	4–4 (5-4 p)	St Vallier (6)	
117	Yeovil Town (6)	0–3	Pucklechurch Sports (5)	
118	Bristol Rovers (5)	7–1	SGS Olveston United (6)	
119	Gloucester City (7)	2–0	Bath City (6)	
120	Bitton (6)	3–1	Paulton Rovers (6)	
121	Frampton Rangers (5)	3–2	Weston Super Mare (6)	
122	Bishops Lydeard (5)	2–2 (3-4 p)	AFC St Austell (5)	
123	Bideford (6)	0–11	Marine Academy Plymouth (5)	
124	Helston Athletic (6)	8–0	Crediton United (7)	
125	Teignmouth (7)	3–1	Bude Town (7)	
126	Plympton (7)	2–2 (5-4 p)	Saltash Borough (7)	75
127	Liskeard Athletic (5)	2–1	Saltash United (7)	
128	Sticker (6)	12–0	St Agnes (7)	

== Third round qualifying ==
The 88 matches of third round qualifying were played on 22 October 2023. This round included the introduction of 48 teams from the fourth-tier FA Women's National League Division One.

Tie	Home team (tier)	Score	Away team (tier)	Att.
1	Birtley Town (7)	3–3 (3-4 p)	Leeds Modernians (7)	
2	Penrith (6)	3–5	Mancunian Unity (6)	
3	Bury (5)	1–1 (2-4 p)	Norton & Stockton Ancients (4)	
4	Guisborough Town (7)	1–6	Stockport County (4)	
5	Gateshead (6)	3–1	Hartlepool United (5)	
6	Middlesbrough (4)	0–0 (2-4 p)	Hull City (4)	
7	Poulton Victoria (6)	0–3	Chorley (4)	
8	Colne (7)	0–7	Alnwick Town (5)	170
9	Sunderland West End (5)	1–2	Darwen (5)	
10	Spennymoor Town (5)	2–1	Wakefield (5)	
11	Tranmere Rovers (5)	1–1 (2-4 p)	Chester-Le-Street Town (4)	200
12	Blackpool (5)	2–2 (4-3 p)	Ossett United (6)	
13	York City (4)	3–0	Hull United (5)	177
14	Durham Cestria (4)	8–0	Bolton Wanderers (6)	
15	West Didsbury & Chorlton (5)	5–1	Redcar Town (5)	
16	FC United of Manchester (4)	2–2 (5-4 p)	Cheadle Town Stingers (5)	119
17	Hartlepool Pools Youth (6)	1–4	York Railway Institute (6)	
18	Harrogate Town (5)	0–5	Wigan Athletic (7)	
19	Leeds United (4)	7–1	Chester (6)	269
20	Wythenshawe (6)	2–3	Barnsley Women (4)	
21	Wallsend BC (5)	1–5	Crewe Alexandra (5)	
22	Basford United (5)	1–1 (2-4 p)	Wyberton Wildcats (7)	
23	Rotherham United (5)	3–2	Long Itchington (6)	142
24	Crusaders (5)	0–9	Sutton Coldfield Town (4)	
25	Oughtibridge War Memorial (6)	0–4	Boldmere St Michaels (4)	
26	Arnold Eagles (6)	1–1 (3-4 p)	Beaumont Park (6)	145
27	Notts County (4)	0–2	Loughborough Lightning (4)	78
28	Lichfield City (5)	3–4	Lincoln City (4)	
29	AFC Rushden & Diamonds (7)	0–4	Lincoln United (5)	
30	St Joseph's Rockware of Worksop (6)	0–3	Lye Town (5)	
31	Chesterfield (5)	3–1	Nottingham Trent University (6)	
32	Inkberrow (7)	0–8	Leafield Athletic (4)	
33	Worcester City (5)	5–1	Anstey Nomads (5)	269
34	Doncaster Rovers Belles (4)	4–0	Mansfield Town (5)	157
35	Solihull Moors (4)	4–0	Port Vale (6)	80
36	Coundon Court (5)	2–0	Thrapston Town (6)	
37	Northampton Town (4)	7–5	Coventry Sphinx (5)	
38	Brunsmeer Athletic (7)	2–3	Dunton & Broughton United (5)	102
39	Bugbrooke St Michaels (7)	2–2 (2-4 p)	Leamington Lions (6)	65
40	Leek Town (4)	10–0	Solihull Sporting (5)	53
41	Shrewsbury Town (5)	2–2 (3-4 p)	Sheffield (4)	250
42	Sporting Khalsa (4)	7–1	Kidderminster Harriers (5)	
43	Enfield Town (5)	4–0	Bowers & Pitsea (5)	
44	Cambridge United (4)	4–2	AFC Sudbury (4)	76

Tie	Home team (tier)	Score	Away team (tier)	Att.
45	Haringey Borough (5)	5–0	Langford (6)	140
46	Real Bedford (5)	4–0	Stevenage (5)	
47	London Seaward (4)	1–3	Norwich City (4)	
48	Leyton Orient (7)	1–5	Wroxham (5)	290
49	Cambridge City (4)	2–10	Peterborough United (4)	
50	Dussindale & Helesdon (7)	2–1	Islington Borough (7)	
51	Wodson Park (6)	1–2	Luton Town (5)	50
52	Harpenden Town (6)	8–0	Brantham Athletic (7)	
53	Needham Market (5)	1–1 (3-0 p)	Royston Town (5)	
54	Thetford Town (7)	2–1	Lawford (6)	
55	Fakenham Town (6)	1–2	Hertford Town (7)	
56	Worthing (4)	2–3	AFC Wimbledon (4)	
57	Montpelier Villa (6)	1–2	Denham United (6)	
58	Headstone Manor (7)	0–6	Dulwich Hamlet (5)	
59	Millwall Lionesses (5)	13–0	Margate (7)	100
60	Actonians (4)	1–1 (3-4 p)	Fulham (5)	100
61	Ebbsfleet United (5)	5–0	Oxford City (5)	
62	Sutton United (5)	3–3 (4-3 p)	Sport London e Benfica (6)	
63	Ashford Town (Middlesex) (4)	6–0	AFC Whyteleafe (6)	35
64	Chesham United (4)	4–0	Sittingbourne (7)	85
65	Woodley United (5)	1–1 (3-1 p)	Aylesford (5)	
66	Ashmount Leigh (6)	0–6	Saltdean United (5)	
67	Selsey (4)	0–8	Bromley (6)	
68	Richmond & Kew (7)	1–3	Maidenhead United (4)	
69	Watford Ladies Development (6)	1–2	Brentford (6)	
70	Haywards Heath Town (4)	3–0	Queens Park Rangers (4)	
71	Dartford (5)	8–1	Wycombe Wanderers (5)	
72	Bitton (6)	0–5	Southampton Women (4)	
73	Plympton (7)	1–5	Bristol Rovers (5)	85
74	Royal Wootton Bassett Town (6)	0–1	AFC Stoneham (6)	
75	Abingdon United (4)	10–1	QK Southampton (7)	
76	Bridgwater United (4)	3–0	Forest Green Rovers (5)	
77	Downend Flyers (6)	1–4	Sherborne Town (5)	
78	Keynsham Town (4)	1–0	Bournemouth Sports (5)	50
79	Exeter City (4)	7–0	Torquay United (4)	
80	Liskeard Athletic (5)	1–3	Swindon Town (4)	
81	AEK Boco (6)	1–3	Helston Athletic (6)	
82	AFC Bournemouth (4)	13–2	AFC St Austell (5)	
83	Sticker (6)	3–2	Frampton Rangers (5)	
84	Portishead Town (4)	9–1	United Services Portsmouth (7)	
85	AFC Portchester (7)	2–0	Pucklechurch Sports (5)	
86	Moneyfields (4)	4–0	Gloucester City (7)	
87	Ilminster Town (6)	2–1	Winchester City Flyers (5)	153
88	Teignmouth (7)	1–7	Marine Academy Plymouth (5)	

== First round proper ==
The 56 matches of first round were played on 12 November 2023. The first round included the introduction of the 24 teams from the third-tier FA Women's National League Premier Division.

Number of teams per tier still in competition
Super League (Note: Women's Super League teams joined the competition in the fourth round.)	Championship (Note: Women's Championship teams joined the competition in the third round.)	Premier Division	Division One (Note: 48 Division One teams joined in the third round qualifying with 38 teams qualifying for the competition.)	Regional & County	Total
12 / 12	12 / 12	24 / 24	38 / 38	50 / 50	136 / 136

12 November 2023	AFC Bournemouth (4)	5–0	Bridgwater United (4)	Ringwood
	Smith 23'; Bleazard 35'; Cooper 53'; K. James 80'; Hillier 90+2'	Report		Stadium: Ringwood Hub

12 November 2023	AFC Fylde (3)	0–1	Durham Cestria (4)	Warton
		Report	Dale 9'	Stadium: Kellamergh Park; Attendance: 50

12 November 2023	Barnsley Women (4)	0–3	Liverpool Feds (3)	Sheffield
		Report	Anderson 5'; Woodcock 8' (o.g.); Fletcher 89'	Stadium: Olympic Legacy Park; Attendance: 163

12 November 2023	Beaumont Park (6)	0–4	Leafield Athletic (4)	Leicester
		Report	Pagan; McCann-Lloyd; Alaka; Jenkins	Stadium: Beaumont Park

12 November 2023	Blackpool (5)	0–1	Spennymoor Town (5)	Blackpool
		Report	Mole 90+2'	Stadium: Bloomfield Road

12 November 2023	Boldmere St Michaels (4)	13–0	Wyberton Wildcats (7)	Boldmere
	Maia 8', 53'; Bevan 11'; Wilson 13', 65'; Bickley 41'; Sutton 45+4', 48'; Billingsley 73'; Travers 79'; Abdallah 80'; Bryan 86'; Taylor 90'	Report		Stadium: Boldmere Community Stadium; Attendance: 60

12 November 2023	Bristol Rovers (5)	3–1	Portishead Town (4)	Bristol
	Curnock 69'; Todd 26', 81'	Report	Hayward 60'	Stadium: Lockleaze Sports Centre

12 November 2023	Bromley (6)	3–2	AFC Portchester (7)	Bromley
	Hull 56', 90+2'; Lee 80'	Report	Currie; Williams	Stadium: Hayes Lane

12 November 2023	Burnley (3)	2–1	Huddersfield Town (3)	Darwen
	Elford 2'; Coleman-Evans 83'	Report	Mallin 20'	Stadium: Anchor Ground; Attendance: 145

12 November 2023	Cambridge United (4)	1–2	Milton Keynes Dons (3)	St Neots
	Webb 44'	Report	Puddick 64'; Wood 86'	Stadium: Rowley Park

12 November 2023	Cardiff City (3)	0–3	Cheltenham Town (3)	Newport
		Report	Harding 4'; Lue 30', 61'	Stadium: Newport Sports Village

12 November 2023	Chesham United (4)	2–3	Ebbsfleet United (5)	Chesham
	Fraser 4'; Bowers 74'	Report	Goal	Stadium: The Meadow; Attendance: 65

12 November 2023	Coundon Court (5)	3–0	Leamington Lions (6)	Coventry
	Lundie 25', 50', 90'	Report		Stadium: Hawkes Mill

12 November 2023	Dartford (5)	3–1	Abingdon United (4)	Dartford
	Goal	Report	Goal	Stadium: Princes Park 3G

12 November 2023	Denham United (6)	2–3	Millwall Lionesses (5)	Denham
	Cashin 3'; Torr 35'	Report	Bailey 5'; Drewe 61'; 65' (o.g.)	Stadium: The Den

12 November 2023	Doncaster Rovers Belles (4)	0–2	Rugby Borough (3)	Moorends
		Report	Nixon 12'; Essam 90'	Stadium: Chesterfield Poultry Stadium

12 November 2023	Dulwich Hamlet (5)	2–0	London Bees (3)	East Dulwich
	Roberts 7'; Corrigan 32'	Report		Stadium: Champion Hill; Attendance: 600

12 November 2023	Dussindale & Hellesdon Rovers (7)	3–4	Needham Market (5)	Horsford
	Bell; Leyer	Report	Gooding 11'; Wakefield 75'; Hall 90+9'; Slater 90+11'	Stadium: The Nest (3G); Attendance: 90

12 November 2023	Fulham (5)	1–9	Portsmouth (3)	New Malden
	Mendes 70'	Report	Quirk 10', 56'; Jones 25', 45'; Lumsden 55', 58', 65'; Rowbotham 61'; Humphrey 78'	Stadium: Motspur Park

12 November 2023	Gateshead (6)	1–2 (a.e.t.)	Alnwick Town (5)	Gateshead
	Richardson 32'	Report	15'; 105' (pen.)	Stadium: Gateshead International Stadium; Attendance: 120

12 November 2023	Harpenden Town (6)	0–3	Luton Town (5)	Harpenden
		Report	Maddix 39'; Spillman 74', 85'	Stadium: Rothamsted Park; Attendance: 478

12 November 2023	Haywards Heath Town (4)	2–4	Chatham Town (3)	Haywards Heath
	Goulden 9', 23'	Report	Grant 41', 84'; Pepper Scott 80'; Jeffkins 82'	Stadium: Hanbury Park

12 November 2023	Helston Athletic (6)	0–8	Exeter City (4)	Helston
		Report	Baker 13'; Zuurmond 16'; Knapman 32'; Ireland 45', 72'; Sharpe 48'; Stacey 66'; Markham 77'	Stadium: Kellaway Park

12 November 2023	Hertford Town (7)	1–3	Haringey Borough (5)	Hertford
	Felstead 87'	Report	Leighton 23' (pen.); Humes 37'; Manktelow 87'	Stadium: Hertingfordbury Park

12 November 2023	Hull City (4)	3–1	Halifax (3)	Barton-upon-Humber
	Knight 25'; Thompson 52'; Dawson 57'	Report	Stevens 27'	Stadium: Marsh Lane; Attendance: 295

12 November 2023	Leeds Modernians (7)	2–4	Darwen (5)	Cookridge
	Goal	Report	Goal	Stadium: Leeds Modernians Sports Club; Attendance: 374

12 November 2023	Leek Town (4)	1–4	Solihull Moors (4)	Leek
	Maya 90+1'	Report	Renken 20', 43'; Russell-Cartwright 31', 67'	Stadium: Harrison Park; Attendance: 86

12 November 2023	Lincoln City (4)	1–5	Derby County (3)	Lincoln
	McHamilton 56'	Report	Sims 16', 45', 62'; Mosby 46', 81'	Stadium: The Moorlands Railway Sports & Social Club; Attendance: 135; Referee: James Moody

12 November 2023	Lincoln United (5)	1–2	Loughborough Lightning (4)	Lincoln
	Wilson 8'	Report	Hines 39'; Hateley 60'	Stadium: Ashby Avenue; Attendance: 106

12 November 2023	Mancunian Unity (6)	2–9	Newcastle United (3)	Limeside
	Charlton 27'; Cardenas 43'	Report	Milne-Redhead 3'; Greenwood 9'; Ferguson 13'; McQuade 23', 39', 90+4'; Wilkinson 76'; Soulsby 80'; Barker 90+1'	Stadium: Whitebank Stadium

12 November 2023	Moneyfields (4)	6–3	Ashford Town (Middlesex) (4)	Basingstoke
	Wilson-Wilton 30', 65'; Simmonds 48'; Phelps 50'; Taylor 67'; Fuller 77'	Report	Goal	Stadium: Winklebury Sports Complex

12 November 2023	Northampton Town (4)	0–6	Ipswich Town (3)	Northampton
		Report	O'Brien 21', 45'; Thomas 28', 90'; Peskett 66'; Horwood 87'	Stadium: Fernie Fields; Attendance: 286; Referee: Peter Kwak

12 November 2023	Norton & Stockton Ancients (4)	0–1	Chester-Le-Street Town (4)	Stockton-on-Tees
		Report	Goal	Stadium: Norton Sports Complex

12 November 2023	Norwich City (4)	1–0	Hashtag United (3)	Horsford
	Smith 9'	Report		Stadium: The Nest; Attendance: 393; Referee: Brian Chapman

12 November 2023	Nottingham Forest (3)	7–0	Sheffield (4)	Long Eaton
	Worsey 28', 50'; Thomas 48'; Reynolds 61', 90'; Keitley 72'; Greengrass 88'	Report		Stadium: Grange Park

12 November 2023	Real Bedford (5)	0–5	Billericay Town (3)	Bedford
		Report	Sealey 1', 10'; Gaylor 70', 90'; Biggs 89'	Stadium: McMullen Park; Attendance: 192

12 November 2023	Rotherham United (5)	0–5	Worcester City (5)	Parkgate
		Report	Highway 2'; Mitcham 37', 77'; Fassnidge 86'; Higgs 89'	Stadium: Roundwood Pavilion

12 November 2023	Saltdean United (5)	1–1 (a.e.t.) (7–8 p)	AFC Wimbledon (4)	Saltdean
	Boswell 62'	Report	Soares-Martins 49'	Stadium: Hill Park; Attendance: 157; Referee: Brent Pettit
	Penalties
	Penalty scored Penalty missed		Penalty scored Penalty missed

12 November 2023	Sporting Khalsa (4)	3–0	Crewe Alexandra (5)	Dudley
	Walker 40', 90+3'; Owen 58'	Report		Stadium: Noose Lane; Attendance: 134

12 November 2023	Sticker (6)	0–4	AFC Stoneham (6)	Sticker
		Report	Melton 37', 45+1', 50', 66'	Stadium: Burngullow Lane

12 November 2023	Stoke City (3)	6–0	Dunton & Broughton United (5)	Stoke-on-Trent
	Thomas-Leek 10', 71'; Logan 18'; Kivel 30'; Holder 48'; Puddefoot 83'	Report		Stadium: Norton Sports; Attendance: 80-

12 November 2023	Sutton Coldfield Town (4)	8–0	Chesterfield (5)	Sutton Coldfield
	Woolston 10', 45'; Handy 37', 61', 66'; Civil 50'; Jefferies 67'; McCormack 90'	Report		Stadium: Coles Lane; Attendance: 94

12 November 2023	Sutton United (5)	3–4 (a.e.t.)	Maidenhead United (4)	Sutton
	Francis 16'; Wells 50'; Backhurst 109'	Report	O'Brien 54'; Cowell 58'; Fisher 106'; Walters 111'	Stadium: Gander Green Lane

12 November 2023	Swindon Town (4)	6–0	Sherborne Town (5)	Swindon
	Jarvis 23', 89'; Beck-Esson 27', 69'; 35' (o.g.); Colston 65'	Report		Stadium: Foundation Park; Attendance: 113

12 November 2023	Thetford Town (7)	2–4	Enfield Town (5)	Thetford
	Omeleviciute	Report	Lloyd; Littlechild; Fowle	Stadium: Mundford Road

12 November 2023	West Bromwich Albion (3)	8–2	Lye Town (5)	West Bromwich
	Warner 27', 68'; Cole 50'; Mahmood 52'; Brown 74'; Loydon 76'; Jhamat 89'; Rabjohn 90+2'	Report	Johnson 1', 47'	Stadium: West Bromwich Albion Academy; Attendance: 150; Referee: Lee Hurst

12 November 2023	West Didsbury & Chorlton (5)	2–6	Leeds United (4)	Chorlton-cum-Hardy
	Gunn 18'; Ainscow 48'	Report	Astle 11', 66', 75'; Elliot 52'; Danby 56'; Smith 69'	Stadium: Brookburn Road; Attendance: 207; Referee: Lee Hurst

12 November 2023	Wolverhampton Wanderers (3)	8–0	Stourbridge (3)	Wellington
	Cross 6', 49', 52'; Hughes 13', 45'; Roberts 40'; Bramford 44'; Morphet 88'	Report		Stadium: New Bucks Head; Attendance: 462; Referee: Daniel Forrester

12 November 2023	Woodley United (5)	0–4	Oxford United (3)	Reading
		Report	Barratt 29', 62'; Legg 41'; King 65'	Stadium: Bulmershe Pavillion

12 November 2023	Wroxham (5)	1–2 (a.e.t.)	Peterborough United (4)	Wroxham
	Middleton 101'	Report	Perkins 91'; Pim 99'	Stadium: Trafford Park

12 November 2023	York City (4)	0–2	FC United Of Manchester (4)	Huntington
		Report	Ritchie 55', 66'	Stadium: York Community Stadium; Attendance: 230

12 November 2023	York Railway Institute (6)	0–3	Stockport County (4)	York
		Report	Bradshaw 69'; Gillin 74', 84'	Stadium: New Lane Sports Club

19 November 2023	Plymouth Argyle (3)	13–0	Ilminster Town (6)	Milehouse
	Endacott 11'; Sara 14', 22', 32', 36', 37'; Medd-Gill 40'; Whitmore 45+4', 73'; Dickson 50'; Dandridge 53', 79'; Rose 84'	Report		Stadium: Home Park; Attendance: 2,060

19 November 2023	Wigan Athletic (7)	0–4	Chorley (4)	Leigh
		Report	Tyers 10'; Fitzpatrick 20', 56'; Catlow 25'	Stadium: Leigh Sports Village

26 November 2023	Brentford (6)	3–4 (a.e.t.)	Southampton Women (4)	Bedfont
	Matthews 53'; Woods 42', 55'	Report	Wood 4', 28', 35'; Etheridge 115'	Stadium: Bedfont Sports Club

26 November 2023	Keynsham Town (4)	3–3 (a.e.t.) (8–7 p)	Marine Academy Plymouth (5)	Keynsham
	Lorton 14'; Vipond 25'; Clipston 36'	Report	Drewery; Thompson; (o.g.)	Stadium: The AJN Stadium
	Penalties
	Penalty scored		Penalty scored Penalty missed

== Second round proper ==
Matches in the second round proper were played on 26 November 2023.

Number of teams per tier still in competition
Super League (Note: Women's Super League teams joined the competition in the fourth round.)	Championship (Note: Women's Championship teams joined the competition in the third round.)	Premier Division	Division One	Regional & County	Total
12 / 12	12 / 12	16 / 24	24 / 38	16 / 50	80 / 136

26 November 2023	Billericay Town (3)	2–1	Dulwich Hamlet (5)	Billericay
	Walsh 50'; Biggs 90+3'	Report	Saylor 35'	Stadium: New Lodge; Attendance: 298

26 November 2023	Burnley (3)	9–1	Alnwick Town (5)	Clitheroe
	Ravening 8'; Coleman-Evans 41'; McParlan 65', 86', 90'; Elford 81'; Embley 82', 90'; Wildgoose 89'	Report	Ellwood 4'	Stadium: EcoGiants Stadium

26 November 2023	Chatham Town (3)	5–4	AFC Wimbledon (4)	Chatham
	Grant 25'; Nicholls 31'; Auguste 44'; Priest 61'; Jeffkins 90+5'	Report	Goddard 8'; Billingham 75'; Hincks 78'; McLachlan 90'	Stadium: The Bauvill Stadium; Attendance: 240

26 November 2023	Cheltenham Town	3–2	Exeter City	Bishop's Cleeve
	Allen 87'; Poole 90'; Owen 90+3'	Report	Stacey 42', 90+5'	Stadium: Kayte Lane; Attendance: 322

26 November 2023	Chester Le Street Town (4)	3–2	Spennymoor Town (5)	Chester-le-Street
	Maggs; Ashton	Report	Mole 40' (pen.), 88' (pen.)	Stadium: Moor Park; Attendance: 242

26 November 2023	Chorley (4)	0–5	Newcastle United (3)	Skelmersdale
		Report	Barker 36'; Galloway 68'; Boddy 76'; Wilkinson 84'; Ferguson 90+4'	Stadium: JMO Sports Park

26 November 2023	Darwen (5)	1–1 (a.e.t.) (4–3 p)	Leeds United (4)	Darwen
	Wood 59'	Report	Rousseau 30'	Stadium: Multevo Anchor Ground; Attendance: 345
	Penalties
	Penalty missed Penalty scored		Penalty scored Penalty missed

26 November 2023	Derby County (3)	4–1	Loughborough Lightning (4)	Mickleover
	Ashton 42', 68'; Sims 48'; May 79'	Report	Purchase 8'	Stadium: Station Road

26 November 2023	Ebbsfleet United (5)	0–7	Portsmouth (3)	Northfleet
		Report	Lumsden 18', 76'; Freeland 22', 61'; Jones 32'; Quirk 37', 45'	Stadium: Stonebridge Road; Attendance: 150

26 November 2023	Enfield Town (5)	3–5	Luton Town (5)	Enfield
	Evans 52'; Fowle 73'; Lloyd 86'	Report	McKay 47' (pen.), 54'; Spillman 56'; Khan 60'; Buttigieg 90+1'	Stadium: Queen Elizabeth II Stadium; Attendance: 160

26 November 2023	FC United Of Manchester (4)	2–3	Hull City (4)	Moston
	O'Carroll 23'; Wildin 90+5'	Report	Lynskey 35'; Knight 58'; Symington 60'	Stadium: Broadhurst Park; Attendance: 390

26 November 2023	Haringey Borough (5)	1–3	Moneyfields (4)	Tottenham
	Campbell 25'	Report	Fuller 12'; Wilson-Wilton 41', 58'	Stadium: Coles Park; Attendance: 120

26 November 2023	Ipswich Town (3)	8–0	Sutton Coldfield Town (4)	Felixstowe
	Thomas 8'; Wearing 23'; O'Brien 35'; Gunning-Williams 67', 69', 90'; Peskett 83', 90'	Report		Stadium: Dellwood Avenue; Attendance: 413

26 November 2023	Leafield Athletic (4)	1–2	Coundon Court (5)	Solihull
	Fallon 57'	Report	Lundie 55'; Shale 65'	Stadium: Dickens Heath Sports Club; Attendance: 102

26 November 2023	Liverpool Feds (3)	0–1	Durham Cestria (4)	Aigburth
		Report	Dale 53'	Stadium: Jericho Lane; Attendance: 125

26 November 2023	Millwall Lionesses (5)	2–0	Bromley (6)	Rotherhithe
	Whitter 28'; Drewe 90+1'	Report		Stadium: St Paul's Sports Ground

26 November 2023	Norwich City (4)	1–2	Boldmere St Michaels (4)	Norwich
	Flye 37'	Report	Formaston 33'; Wilson 90'	Stadium: The Nest; Attendance: 333

26 November 2023	Nottingham Forest (3)	3–2	Sporting Khalsa (4)	Long Eaton
	Moncaster 23'; Domingo 39'; Worsley 41'	Report	Stubbs 43'; Joyce 83'	Stadium: Grange Park

26 November 2023	Oxford United (3)	2–0	Dartford (5)	Marston
	Barratt 66', 90'	Report		Stadium: Marsh Lane; Attendance: 153

26 November 2023	Plymouth Argyle (3)	4–2	AFC Stoneham (6)	Newton Abbot
	Sara 10', 77'; Rose 14'; McDonnell 65'	Report	Lucas 83'; Delaney 90'	Stadium: Coach Road; Attendance: 112

26 November 2023	Rugby Borough (3)	7–1	Solihull Moors (4)	Rugby
	Greenslade 15'; Essam 21', 53', 89'; Mann 39'; Wiseman 70'; Curwood-Wagner 77'	Report	Hornsby 55'	Stadium: Kilsby Lane; Attendance: 171

26 November 2023	Stoke City (3)	1–0	Stockport County (4)	Stoke-on-Trent
	Leek 42'	Report		Stadium: Norton Sports; Attendance: 98

26 November 2023	Swindon Town (4)	1–2	AFC Bournemouth (4)	Swindon
	Colston 37'	Report	McGuiness 76'; Gilroy 90'	Stadium: County Ground

26 November 2023	West Bromwich Albion (4)	3–0 (a.e.t.)	Needham Market (5)	Great Barr
	Mahmood 104', 116'; Jhamat 114'	Report		Stadium: Ray Hall Lane; Attendance: 100

26 November 2023	Wolverhampton Wanderers (3)	7–0	Peterborough United (4)	Wellington
	Hughes 2', 9', 83'; George 4'; Roberts 40'; Bramford 61'; Johnson 66'	Report		Stadium: New Bucks Head; Attendance: 338

26 November 2023	Worcester City (5)	0–3	Milton Keynes Dons (3)	Worcester
		Report	Wood 50', 69'; Mitchell 64'	Stadium: Sixways Stadium

3 December 2023	Bristol Rovers (5)	1–2	Keynsham Town (4)	Bristol
	Costa 81'	Report	Lorton 12'; Clipson 57'	Stadium: Lockleaze Sports Centre

3 December 2023	Southampton Women (4)	3–0	Maidenhead United (4)	Basingstoke
	Ball 20'; Chaffe 45'; Sievwright 62'	Report		Stadium: Winklebury Sports Complex

== Third round proper ==
Matches were played in the third round proper on 10 December 2023. The third round included the introduction of the 12 teams from the second-tier Women's Championship.

Number of teams per tier still in competition
Super League (Note: Women's Super League teams joined the competition in the fourth round.)	Championship	Premier Division	Division One	Regional & County	Total
12 / 12	12 / 12	15 / 24	9 / 38	4 / 50	52 / 136

10 December 2023	AFC Bournemouth (4)	0–6	Charlton Athletic (2)	Boscombe
		Report	Muya 55', 60'; K. James 58' (o.g.); Addison 68'; Johnson 80'; Humphrey 90'	Stadium: Dean Court; Attendance: 1,675

10 December 2023	Cheltenham Town (3)	0–4	Reading (2)	Bishop's Cleeve
		Report	Cooper 9'; Wade 11'; Wellings 46', 47'	Stadium: Kayte Lane; Attendance: 291; Referee: Harry Organ

10 December 2023	Chester Le Street Town (4)	1–5	Derby County (3)	Chester-le-Street
	Hockaday 68'	Report	Mosby 3', 38'; May 5'; Sims 26', 32'	Stadium: Moor Park; Attendance: 62

10 December 2023	Coundon Court (5)	0–11	Burnley (3)	Leamington Spa
		Report	A. Kelly 11', 56', 59'; McPartlan 18', 80', 90'; Ravening 23', 39'; Elford 25', 65', 90+3'	Stadium: New Windmill Ground

10 December 2023	Crystal Palace (2)	6–0	Chatham Town (3)	Sutton
	Sharpe 13'; E. Hughes 41', 64', 85'; Barry 81'; Cataldo 83'; Blanchard 88'	Report		Stadium: Gander Green Lane

10 December 2023	Darwen (5)	0–4	Blackburn Rovers (2)	Darwen
		Report	Hornby 9'; Shepherd 41'; Toland 70'; C. Williams 81'	Stadium: Anchor Ground; Attendance: 1,136

10 December 2023	London City Lionesses (2)	6–0	Billericay Town (3)	Dartford
	Carter 19', 55'; Farrelly 34'; Fitzgerald 68'; Alexander 73'; Brougham 78'	Report		Stadium: Princes Park

10 December 2023	Milton Keynes Dons (3)	0–2	Birmingham City (2)	Milton Keynes
		Report	Yu-ri 90'; Fuso 90'	Stadium: Stadium MK; Attendance: 651; Referee: Joanne Horwood

10 December 2023	Moneyfields (4)	1–0	Millwall Lionesses (5)	Portsmouth
	Taylor 35'	Report		Stadium: Langstone Ground

10 December 2023	Newcastle United (3)	5–0	Stoke City (3)	Gateshead
	Galloway 22', 53'; Barker 65'; Soulsby 83', 86'	Report		Stadium: Gateshead International Stadium; Attendance: 654

10 December 2023	Nottingham Forest (3)	3–1	Boldmere St Michaels (4)	Long Eaton
	Johnson 3'; Moncaster 42'; Worsey 45'	Report	Formaston 35'	Stadium: Grange Park

10 December 2023	Plymouth Argyle (3)	2–2 (a.e.t.) (5–3 p)	Oxford United (3)	Newton Abbot
	Orchard 90'; Crawford 112'	Report	Liggett 45'; Barratt 111'	Stadium: Coach Road; Attendance: 123
	Penalties
	Penalty scored		Penalty scored Penalty missed

10 December 2023	Portsmouth (3)	1–2	Southampton (2)	Havant
	Jones 36'	Report	Morris 16'; Purfield 72'	Stadium: Westleigh Park; Attendance: 1,848

10 December 2023	Rugby Borough (3)	2–3 (a.e.t.)	Sheffield United (2)	Rugby
	Nixon 17'; Greenslade 55'	Report	Goodwin 32', 87', 93'	Stadium: Kilsby Lane; Attendance: 285

10 December 2023	Southampton Women (4)	1–6	Watford (2)	Southampton
	Jeal 35'	Report	Agyemang 45'; Johns 47'; Harbert 59', 68', 90+3'; Haines 84'	Stadium: Test Park; Attendance: 102

10 December 2023	Sunderland (2)	7–0	Durham Cestria (4)	Hetton-le-Hole
	Ejupi 5'; Westrup 15', 88'; Kitching 34', 58'; McAteer 45'; Dear 51'	Report		Stadium: Eppleton Colliery Welfare Ground; Attendance: 339

10 December 2023	West Bromwich Albion (4)	0–5	Durham (2)	Perry Barr
		Report	Wilson 37'; Ryan-Doyle 66'; Crosthwaite 73'; Noonan 78'; Salicki 90+3'	Stadium: Alexander Stadium

17 December 2023	Hull City (4)	1–4	Wolverhampton Wanderers (3)	Barton-upon-Humber
	Tanser 44'	Report	A. Hughes 59'; Morphet 73'; Bramford 89'; Merrick 90+6'	Stadium: Easy Buy Stadium

17 December 2023	Ipswich Town (3)	3–0	Lewes (2)	Felixstowe
	Robertson 35'; Gunning-Williams 45'; Doe 51'	Report		Stadium: AGL Arena; Attendance: 450

17 December 2023	Luton Town (5)	1–0	Keynsham Town (4)	Barton-le-Clay
	Khan 83'	Report		Stadium: Sharpenhoe Road

== Fourth round proper ==
16 matches were played in the fourth round proper on 13 and 14 January 2024. The draw took place on 12 December 2023. This round included the introduction of 12 teams from the first-tier Women's Super League, and was the final round to introduce new teams.

Number of teams per tier still in competition
Super League	Championship	Premier Division	Division One	Regional & County	Total
12 / 12	11 / 12	7 / 24	1 / 38	1 / 50	32 / 136

13 January 2024	Aston Villa (1)	0–3	Everton (1)	Walsall
12:30		Report	Olesen 58'; Snoeijs 80', 87' (pen.)	Stadium: Bescot Stadium; Attendance: 1,394; Referee: Amy Fearns

14 January 2024	Manchester United (1)	5–0	Newcastle United (3)	Leigh
12:00	Toone 28'; Parris 36', 55'; Williams 71'; Malard 90+1'	Report		Stadium: Leigh Sports Village; Attendance: 4,731; Referee: Megan Wilson

14 January 2024	Durham (2)	0–4	Manchester City (1)	Durham
12:30		Report	Coombs 7'; Roord 38', 69'; Fowler 87'	Stadium: Maiden Castle; Attendance: 2,381; Referee: Elizabeth Simms

14 January 2024	Sunderland (2)	0–2	Southampton (2)	Hetton-le-Hole
13:00		Report	Wilkinson 54', 87'	Stadium: Eppleton CW; Attendance: 300; Referee: Levi Gray

14 January 2024	Chelsea (1)	3–1 (a.e.t.)	West Ham United (1)	Kingston upon Thames
13:00	Fishel 69'; Cuthbert 100'; Beever-Jones 105+1'	Report	Asseyi 20'	Stadium: Kingsmeadow; Attendance: 2,824; Referee: Emily Heaslip

14 January 2024	Crystal Palace (2)	3–1	Blackburn Rovers (2)	Sutton
13:00	Nolan 75'; Hughes 78'; Sharpe 87'	Report	Hornby 57'	Stadium: VBS Community Stadium; Attendance: 252; Referee: Aaron Ford

14 January 2024	Arsenal (1)	5–1	Watford (2)	Borehamwood
13:00	Russo 6'; Wälti 12'; Blackstenius 68'; Ilestedt 88'; Maanum 90'	Report	Agyemang 79'	Stadium: Meadow Park; Attendance: 3,739; Referee: Adewunmi Soneye

14 January 2024	Luton Town (5)	0–6	Brighton & Hove Albion (1)	Barton-le-Clay
13:00		Report	Sarri 34'; Losada 39'; Pinto 48', 72'; Terland 55'; Bremer 88'	Stadium: Sharpenhoe Road; Attendance: 1,235; Referee: Ruby Sykes

14 January 2024	Plymouth Argyle (3)	1–6	Nottingham Forest (3)	Plymouth
13:00	Berrow 90'	Report	Worsey 16', 45+2'; Manders 49'; Domingo 58'; Moncaster 75'; Greengrass 79'	Stadium: Home Park; Attendance: 1,844; Referee: Joanne Horwood

14 January 2024	Ipswich Town (3)	1–4	Charlton Athletic (2)	Felixstowe
13:00	Peskett 9'	Report	Johnson 37', 41'; Godfrey 45+3' (pen.); N'Dow 74'	Stadium: The Goldstar Ground; Attendance: 770; Referee: Callum Parke

14 January 2024	Bristol City (1)	0–1	Liverpool (1)	Ashton Gate
13:00		Report	Bonner 85'	Stadium: Ashton Gate; Attendance: 2,563; Referee: Lisa Benn

14 January 2024	Burnley (3)	1–3 (a.e.t.)	Birmingham City (2)	Leyland
14:00	Ravening 90+5' (pen.)	Report	Smith 21'; Walker 104'; Moore 120+4'	Stadium: County Ground; Attendance: 181; Referee: Danielle Whitworth

14 January 2024	Tottenham Hotspur (1)	3–2	Sheffield United (2)	Leyton
14:00	England 69', 81'; Ayane 90+6'	Report	Haywood 14'; Sigsworth 51'	Stadium: Brisbane Road; Attendance: 894; Referee: Laura van Lier

14 January 2024	Reading (2)	1–2	Wolverhampton Wanderers (3)	Aldershot
14:00	Perry 35'	Report	Merrick 73'; Toussaint 88'	Stadium: Aldershot EBB Stadium; Attendance: 154; Referee: Aimee Keir

14 January 2024	Derby County (3)	0–4	Leicester City (1)	Mickleover
15:00		Report	Petermann 29'; Cayman 58'; Rose 70'; Steggles 76' (o.g.)	Stadium: Don Amott Arena; Attendance: 911; Referee: Phoebe Cross

14 January 2024	London City Lionesses (2)	4–0	Moneyfields (4)	Dartford
15:00	Littlejohn 45+2'; Neville 55'; Boye-Hlorkah 60'; Carter 69'	Report		Stadium: Princes Park; Attendance: 2,381; Referee: Ella Broad

== Fifth round proper ==
Eight matches were played in the fifth round proper on 10 and 11 February 2024, made up of the 16 winning teams from the fourth round proper. The draw took place on 15 January 2024.

Number of teams per tier still in competition
Super League	Championship	Premier Division	Division One	Regional & County	Total
10 / 12	5 / 12	1 / 24	0 / 38	0 / 50	16 / 136

10 February 2024	Leicester City (1)	6–2	Birmingham City (2)	Burton upon Trent
12:00	Cayman 19'; O'Brien 23', 42'; Takarada 59'; Rose 66'; Whelan 82'	Report	Goodwin 2' (o.g.); Smith 41'	Stadium: Pirelli Stadium; Attendance: 609; Referee: Megan Wilson

10 February 2024	Tottenham Hotspur (1)	1–0	Charlton Athletic (2)	Leyton
17:15	Graham 76'	Report		Stadium: Brisbane Road; Attendance: 974; Referee: Lisa Benn

11 February 2024	Arsenal (1)	0–1	Manchester City (1)	Borehamwood
12:30		Report	Aleixandri 74'	Stadium: Meadow Park; Attendance: 3,496; Referee: Stacey Pearson

11 February 2024	Wolverhampton Wanderers (3)	1–4	Brighton & Hove Albion (1)	Telford
13:00	Merrick 67' (pen.)	Report	Robinson 42'; Kullberg 88', 90+2', 90+6'	Stadium: New Bucks Head; Attendance: 1,812; Referee: Phoebe Cross

11 February 2024	London City Lionesses (2)	0–2	Liverpool (1)	Dartford
14:00		Report	Haug 6'; Lawley 67'	Stadium: Princes Park; Attendance: 1,131; Referee: Chloe-Ann Small

11 February 2024	Southampton (2)	1–3	Manchester United (1)	Eastleigh
14:00	Lloyd-Smith 65'	Report	Toone 8'; Williams 74', 82'	Stadium: Silverlake Stadium; Attendance: 4,554; Referee: Jade Wardle

11 February 2024	Chelsea (1)	1–0	Crystal Palace (2)	Kingston upon Thames
14:00	Ramírez 81'	Report		Stadium: Kingsmeadow; Attendance: 2,992; Referee: Ella Broad

11 February 2024	Nottingham Forest (3)	1–7	Everton (1)	Long Eaton
16:00	Greengrass 47'	Report	Kühl 23'; Piemonte 33'; Vanhaevermaet 52'; Batty 73' (o.g.); Bissell 84'; Duggan 88' (pen.); Bennison 90+4'	Stadium: Grange Park; Attendance: 1,130; Referee: Elizabeth Simms

== Quarter-finals ==
Four matches were played in the quarter-finals on 9 and 10 March 2024, made up of the eight winning teams from the fifth round proper.

Number of teams per tier still in competition
Super League	Championship	Premier Division	Division One	Regional & County	Total
8 / 12	0 / 12	0 / 24	0 / 38	0 / 50	8 / 136

9 March 2024	Liverpool (1)	0–2	Leicester City (1)	Birkenhead
12:00		Report	Rantala 15', 63'	Stadium: Prenton Park; Attendance: 1,342; Referee: Melissa Burgin

9 March 2024	Brighton & Hove Albion (1)	0–4	Manchester United (1)	Crawley
17:15		Report	Turner 8'; Parris 17'; García 45+1'; Naalsund 59'	Stadium: Broadfield Stadium; Attendance: 3,701; Referee: Lisa Benn

10 March 2024	Everton (1)	0–1	Chelsea (1)	Liverpool
13:00		Report	Macário 66'	Stadium: Walton Hall Park; Attendance: 1,212; Referee: Abigail Byrne

10 March 2024	Tottenham Hotspur (1)	1–1 (a.e.t.) (4–3 p)	Manchester City (1)	Leyton
15:00	England 90+6'	Report	Fowler 6'	Stadium: Brisbane Road; Attendance: 1,314; Referee: Kirsty Dowle
	Penalties
	England (penalty scored); Ayane (penalty missed); Nildén (penalty scored); Wang (penalty scored); James-Turner (penalty scored)		(penalty missed) Greenwood; (penalty missed) C. Kelly; (penalty scored) Hasegawa; (penalty scored) Angeldal; (penalty scored) Fowler

== Semi-finals ==
Two matches will be played in the semi-finals on 14 April 2024, made up of the four winning teams from the quarter-finals.

Number of teams per tier still in competition
Super League	Championship	Premier Division	Division One	Regional & County	Total
4 / 12	0 / 12	0 / 24	0 / 38	0 / 50	4 / 136

14 April 2024	Tottenham Hotspur (1)	2–1 (a.e.t.)	Leicester City (1)	Tottenham
12:00	Naz 83'; Thomas 118'	Report	Rantala 12'	Stadium: Tottenham Hotspur Stadium; Attendance: 18,078; Referee: Emily Heaslip

14 April 2024	Manchester United (1)	2–1	Chelsea (1)	Leigh
14:35	García 1'; Williams 23'	Report	L. James 45+4'	Stadium: Leigh Sports Village; Attendance: 6,876; Referee: Kirsty Dowle

== Final ==
The final was played at Wembley Stadium on Sunday 12 May 2024 at 14:30.

12 May 2024
14:30 BST

Manchester United	4–0	Tottenham Hotspur
Toone 45+3'; Williams 54'; García 57', 74'	Report

Wembley Stadium, London
Attendance: 76,082
Referee: Abigail Byrne (Cambridgeshire)

== Television rights ==
Round	Date	Teams	Kick-off	Channels	
Round	Date	Teams	Kick-off	Digital	TV
Fourth round	14 January	Durham v Manchester City	12:30pm	BBC iPlayer	BBC Red Button
Fifth round	11 February	Arsenal v Manchester City	12:30pm	BBC iPlayer	BBC Two
Quarter-finals	10 March	Chelsea v Everton	1:00pm	BBC iPlayer	BBC Red Button
Semi-finals	14 April	Manchester United v Chelsea	12:00pm	BBC iPlayer	BBC One
Semi-finals	14 April	Tottenham Hotspur v Leicester City	2:35pm	BBC iPlayer	BBC Two
Final	12 May	Manchester United v Tottenham Hotspur	2:30pm	BBC iPlayer	BBC One
