= 2023–24 Nottingham Forest W.F.C. season =

Nottingham Forest
2023–24 season
- Owner: Evangelos Marinakis
- Chairman: Nicholas Randall KC (until 29 August); Tom Cartledge (from 29 August)
- Head Coach: Carly Davies
- Stadium: Grange Park, Long Eaton; City Ground, West Bridgford
- FA WNL Northern Premier Division: 3rd
- Women's FA Cup: 5th Round
- FA WNL Cup: 2nd Round
- Top goalscorer: League: Charlotte Greengrass (13); All: Holly Manders (16)
- Highest home attendance: 6,037 v Derby County; 08 October 2023 (FA WNL Northern Premier Division)
- Lowest home attendance: 175 v Sporting Khalsa; 26 November 2023 (Women's FA Cup)
- Average home league attendance: 1,382
- Biggest win: 7 – 0 v Stourbridge (Home); 20 August 2023 (FA WNL Northern Premier Division); 7 – 0 v Sheffield (Home); 12 November 2023 (Women's FA Cup)
- Biggest defeat: 1 – 7 v Everton (Home); 11 February 2024 (Women's FA Cup)
Home colours	Away colours	Third colours

The 2023–24 season was Nottingham Forest Women's sixth consecutive season in the FA Women's National League Northern Premier Division, which stands at level three of the women's football league pyramid.

Prior to the beginning of the season Nottingham Forest Women were fully integrated into the wider football department of Nottingham Forest moving to a professional hybrid model for the 2023/24 season as phase one of a strategy to create a full-time professional team.

This transition brought multiple changes to the clubs staff. Amber Wildgust was appointed as Head of Women's and Girls Football, Carly Davies was appointed as Head Coach and Dave Long was appointed as Head of Girls Academy.

This was the first season that the club used Grange Park in Long Eaton as their main home ground after 4 years at Halbrooke Stadium in Eastwood.

Forest started the season strongly with successive league victories over Stourbridge (home, 7-0), West Bromwich Albion (away, 1-4), and AFC Fylde (home, 3-1) and a 5-0 away win against Solihull Moors to progress to the FA Women’s National League Cup first round and defend their 2022-2023 crown.

September and October proved to be challenging for Carly Davies’ side, however, with an FA Women’s National League Cup second-round home 2-1 win over Wolverhampton Wanderers and home 5-0 league win over Liverpool Feds sitting between league defeats over promotion rivals Burnley (away, 4-2), local rivals Derby County at (home, 1-2), and a Women’s National League Cup third-round away 3-0 defeat against eventual beaten finalists Newcastle United. Forest responded by winning 10 of their next 11 matches including four Women's FA Cup wins against Sheffield FC (home, 7-0), Sporting Khalsa (home, 3-2), Boldmere St Michaels (home, 3-1) and Plymouth Argyle (away, 1-6) to set up a fifth-round proper tie against Women’s Super League outfit Everton. This run (of which the only loss was a 0-1 home defeat against league leaders Newcastle United) left the side in 2nd place (four points behind Newcastle).

Carly Davies’ side was unable to take their momentum from eight consecutive wins into the Women’s FA Cup fifth-round tie against Everton with the Women’s Super League side running out comfortable 1-7 winners at Grange Park with Forest generating £123,000 in revenue from their furthest run in the competition since the 2012-2013 season. Forest was unable to rebuild the momentum they created between November 2023 and February 2024 for their final nine FA Women’s National League Northern Premier League fixtures and took only 17 points from a possible 27 and finished their title defence in 3rd place on 47 points (1 point behind 2nd placed Burnley and 12 points behind champions Newcastle United), missing out on promotion to the Women’s Championship for another season.

== Squad information ==
=== First team squad ===
As of 9 March 2024

No.	Name	Nat.	Date of birth (age)	Since	Signed from
Goalkeepers
1	Emily Batty	(England)	2 November 1998 (age 28)	18 July 2021	(England) Sheffield United
18	Aja Aguirre	(Canada)	18 November 1991 (age 34)	1 July 2019	(England) Aston Villa
34	Holly Mears	(England)	16 January 2006 (age 20)	13 January 2024	(England) Leicester City
Defenders
2	Lyndsey Harkin	(England)	30 August 1991 (age 35)	1 February 2016	(England) Doncaster Rovers Belles
3	Nat Johnson	(Northern Ireland)	12 November 1993 (age 33)	10 August 2023	(England) Lewes
5	Olivia Cook	(England)	10 January 2001 (age 25)	1 July 2019	(England) Doncaster Rovers Belles
11	Chloe Dixon	(England)	12 July 1996 (age 30)	19 August 2023	(England) Blackburn Rovers
15	Laura-Jayne O'Neill	(England)	1 December 1994 (age 31)	1 July 2017	(England) Notts County
21	Hayley James	(England)	17 July 1995 (age 31)	1 August 2020	(England) Leicester City
24	Ella Haughey	(Northern Ireland)	15 July 2004 (age 22)	20 October 2023	(Northern Ireland) Lisburn Rovers
32	Abi Cowie	(England)	20 May 2004 (age 22)	16 August 2023	(England) Birmingham City
Midfielders
6	Lauren McMurchie	(Scotland)	6 January 1992 (age 34)	1 March 2024	(United Arab Emirates) Onyx F.C.
10	Holly Manders	(England)	28 April 2001 (age 25)	2 August 2023	(England) Sunderland
12	Niamh Reynolds	(Republic of Ireland)	31 October 2001 (age 25)	1 August 2020	(England) Reading
16	Mollie Green	(England)	4 August 1997 (age 29)	5 August 2023	(England) Birmingham City
17	Freya Thomas	(England)	28 October 2001 (age 25)	7 August 2023	(England) Coventry United
19	Becky Anderson	(England)	-	2 July 2021	(England) Coventry United
25	Alice Keitley	(England)	4 July 2003 (age 23)	6 October 2023	(England) Aston Villa
36	Lily Stevenson	(England)	-	-	Academy
Forwards
7	Sophie Domingo	(England)	7 January 2000 (age 26)	1 July 2022	(England) Derby County
8	Mai Moncaster	(England)	14 August 2001 (age 25)	1 September 2019	(England) Leicester City
14	Louanne Worsey	(England)	18 May 2005 (age 21)	16 September 2023	(England) Birmingham City
22	Charlotte Greengrass	(England)	-	1 September 2020	(England) Aston Villa

== Squad Changes ==
=== Transfers In ===
Date	Pos.	Player	From	Fee	Ref.
2 August 2023	MF	Holly Manders	Sunderland	Free agent	
5 August 2023	MF	Mollie Green	Birmingham City	Free agent	
7 August 2023	MF	Freya Thomas	Coventry United	Free agent	
10 August 2023	DF	Natalie Johnson	Lewes	Free agent	
19 August 2023	DF	Chloe Leigh Dixon	Blackburn Rovers	Free agent	
20 October 2023	DF	Ella Haughey	Lisburn Rangers	Free agent	
9 March 2024	MF	Lauren McMurchie	Onyx F.C.	Free agent	

=== Transfers Out ===
Date	Pos.	Player	To	Fee	Ref.

=== Loans In ===
Date from	Pos.	Player	From	Duration	Ref.
16 September 2023	DF	Abi Louise Cowie	Birmingham City	Season-long loan	
16 September 2023	FW	Louanne Worsey	Birmingham City	Season-long loan	
6 October 2023	MF	Alice Keitley	Aston Villa	Season-long loan (Note: dual-registration loan)	
13 January 2024	GK	Holly Mears	Leicester City	Season-long loan (Note: dual-registration loan)	

=== Loans Out ===
Date from	Pos.	Player	To	Duration	Ref.

=== Released ===
Date	Pos.	Player	Subsequent club	Date signed	Ref.
30 June 2023	FW	Iris Achterhof	Retired		
30 June 2023	DF	Aryanna Daniels	Retired		
30 June 2023	DF	Georgia Hewitt	Loughborough Lightning		
30 June 2023	DF	Emily Jacobs	Loughborough Lightning		
30 June 2023	FW	Gianna Mitchell	Retired		
30 June 2023	FW	Yasmin Mosby	Derby County	29 July 2023	
30 June 2023	MF	Naomi Powell	Hibernian	29 July 2023	
30 June 2023	MF	Charlotte Steggles	Derby County	29 July 2023	
30 June 2023	MF	Rosetta Taylor	Adelaide United	28 September 2023	
30 June 2023	MF	Amy West	Retired		

=== New contracts ===
Date	Pos.	Player	Contract length	Ref.
21 July 2023	MF	Becky Anderson	One year	
21 July 2023	GK	Emily Batty	One year	
21 July 2023	DF	Olivia Cook	One year	
21 July 2023	FW	Charlotte Greengrass	One year	
21 July 2023	DF	Lyndsey Harkin	One year	
21 July 2023	DF	Hayley James	One year	
21 July 2023	FW	Mai Moncaster	One year	
21 July 2023	DF	Laura-Jayne O'Neill	One year	
21 July 2023	MF	Niamh Reynolds	One year	
2 August 2023	FW	Sophie Domingo	One year	
19 August 2023	GK	Aja Aguirre	One year	

== Pre-season and friendlies ==
Win Draw Loss Fixtures

23 July 2023 Friendly	Nottingham Forest	1 - 3	Southampton	Long Eaton
	Niamh Reynolds 22'	Report	Trialist 36'; Ella Morris 40'; Lucia Kendall 46'	Stadium: Grange Park

26 July 2023 Friendly	Rugby Borough	1 - 4	Nottingham Forest	Rugby
	Goal	Report	Becky Anderson; Charlotte Greengrass; Trialist1; Trialist2	Stadium: Kilsby Lane

30 July 2023 Friendly	Nottingham Forest	1 - 0	Sunderland	Long Eaton
	Trialist 24'	Report		Stadium: Grange Park

06 August 2023 Friendly	Birmingham City	1 - 1	Nottingham Forest	Kings Norton
	Libby Smith 90'	Report	Sophie Domingo 40'	Stadium: Wast Hills Training Ground

13 August 2023 Friendly	Sheffield United	1 - 2	Nottingham Forest	Sheffield
	Goal	Report	Freya Thomas; Becky Anderson

== Competitions ==
=== Overall record ===
Competition	First match	Last match	Starting round	Final position	Record							
Competition	First match	Last match	Starting round	Final position	Pld	W	D	L	GF	GA	GD	Win %
WNL Northern Premier Division	20 August 2023	05 May 2024	Matchday 1	Third	22	15	2	5	59	21	+38	68.18
Women's FA Cup	12 November 2023	11 February 2024	First round	Fifth round	5	4	0	1	20	11	+9	80.00
WNL Cup	27 August 2023	29 October 2023	Determining round	Second round	3	2	0	1	7	3	+4	66.67
Total					30	21	2	7	86	35	+51	70.00

Source: Soccerway

=== FA Women's National League Northern Premier Division ===
==== Results summary ====
Overall								Home						Away					
Pld	W	D	L	GF	GA	GD	Pts	W	D	L	GF	GA	GD	W	D	L	GF	GA	GD
22	15	2	5	59	21	+38	47	9	0	2	30	6	+24	6	2	3	29	15	+14

Source: Soccerway

==== Results by round ====
Round	1	2	3	4	5	6	7	8	9	10	11	12	13	14	15	16	17	18	19	20	21	22
Ground	H	A	H	A	H	H	H	H	A	H	A	H	A	A	H	H	A	A	A	A	A	H
Result	W	W	W	L	L	W	W	L	W	W	W	W	W	D	W	W	D	W	W	L	L	W
Position	1	1	2	2	5	5	4	4	3	3	3	2	2	2	2	2	2	3	3	3	3	3
Points	3	6	9	9	9	12	15	15	18	21	24	27	30	31	34	37	38	41	44	44	44	47

Source: Soccerway
A = Away; H = Home; W = Win; D = Draw; L = Loss

==== Matches ====
Win Draw Loss Fixtures

20 August 2023 1	Nottingham Forest	7 - 0	Stourbridge	Long Eaton
16:00 BST	Charlotte Greengrass 6', 39', 62'; Sophie Domingo 19', 21'; Holly Manders 25'; Natalie Johnson 45+1'; Becky Anderson (yellow card)	Report		Stadium: Grange Park; Attendance: 636

03 September 2023 2	West Bromwich Albion	1 - 4	Nottingham Forest	Redditch
15:00 BST	Meesha Dudley-Jones 90'	Report	Freya Thomas 29'; Charlotte Greengrass 33', 66'; Mai Moncaster 90'; Natalie Johnson (yellow card)	Stadium: Valley Stadium; Attendance: 254

09 September 2023 4	Nottingham Forest	3 - 1	AFC Fylde	Long Eaton
14:00 BST	Mai Moncaster 9', 11'; Chloe Leigh Dixon 33'	Report	Ginny Lackey 18'	Stadium: Grange Park; Attendance: 657

17 September 2023 5	Burnley	4 - 2	Nottingham Forest	Leyland
14:00 BST	Millie Grace Ravening 20', 58' (yellow card); Amaya Coleman-Evans 27'; Brenna McPartlan 37'; Alethea Paul (yellow card)	Report	Freya Thomas 21'; Natalie Johnson 24'; Holly Manders (yellow card); Louanne Worsey (red card)	Stadium: County Ground; Attendance: 158

08 October 2023 7	Nottingham Forest	1 - 2	Derby County	West Bridgford
14:00 BST	Holly Manders 41'; Abi Louise Cowie (yellow card)	Report	Yasmin Mosby 3'; Eleanor Ashton 10'; Camille Jenkins (yellow card); Emily Joyce (yellow card); Molly Sutherland (yellow card)	Stadium: City Ground; Attendance: 6037

15 October 2023 6	Nottingham Forest	5 - 0	Liverpool Feds	Long Eaton
14:00 BST	Charlotte Greengrass 16', 19', 49' (yellow card); Natalie Johnson 73'; Mollie Green 77'	Report		Stadium: Grange Park; Attendance: 397
Note: Match postponed from 24 September 2023

05 November 2023 10	Nottingham Forest	2 - 0	Wolverhampton Wanderers	Long Eaton
14:00 GMT	Holly Manders 28' (yellow card); Louanne Worsey 81' (yellow card); Emily Batty (yellow card)	Report		Stadium: Grange Park; Attendance: 320

19 November 2023 3	Nottingham Forest	0 - 1	Newcastle United	West Bridgford
14:00 GMT	Freya Thomas (yellow card)	Report	Kacie Elson 59'; Emma Rose Kelly (yellow card); Charlotte Potts (yellow card)	Stadium: City Ground; Attendance: 4955

03 December 2023 11	Stoke City	1 - 5	Nottingham Forest	Stoke-on-Trent
14:00 GMT	Heidi Logan	Report	Louanne Worsey 9'; Holly Manders 42', 69'; Sophie Domingo 60'; Natalie Johnson 82'	Stadium: Bet365 Stadium

07 January 2024 12	Nottingham Forest	3 - 0	West Bromwich Albion	Long Eaton
14:00 GMT	Louanne Worsey 32', 56'; Holly Manders 64'; Abi Louise Cowie (yellow card); Mai Moncaster (yellow card)	Report	Francesca Orthodoxou (yellow card); Jessica Reavill (yellow card); Niamh Deasy (yellow card); Janelle Straker (yellow card)	Stadium: Grange Park; Attendance: 347

21 January 2024 16	Newcastle United	1 - 2	Nottingham Forest	Kingston Park
14:00 GMT	Georgia Gibson 4'; Olivia Watt (yellow card)	Report	Alice Keitley 30'; Niamh Reynolds 90'; Becky Anderson (yellow card); Abi Louise Cowie (yellow card); Mollie Green (yellow card)	Stadium: Kingston Park; Attendance: 3361

28 January 2024 14	Nottingham Forest	2 - 1	Burnley	Long Eaton
14:00 GMT	Alice Keitley 75'; Mai Moncaster 90+4'; Abi Louise Cowie (yellow card)	Report	Ginny Lackey 90+8'	Stadium: Grange Park; Attendance: 624

04 February 2024 13	AFC Fylde	0 - 6	Nottingham Forest	Warton
14:00 GMT		Report	Alice Keitley 13'; Sophie Domingo 45'; Charlotte Greengrass 57', 90+10'; Louanne Worsey 87'; Natalie Johnson 90+4'; Ella Haughey (yellow card); Mollie Green (red card)	Stadium: Kellamergh Park; Attendance: 70

18 February 2024 15	Liverpool Feds	1 - 1	Nottingham Forest	Liverpool
14:00 GMT	Bethany Donoghue 18' (yellow card); Paige Cole (yellow card); Ellie Fletcher (yellow card); Mia Isobel Parry (yellow card)	Report	Sophie Domingo 57'	Stadium: Jericho Lane Football Hub; Attendance: 151

03 March 2024 19	Nottingham Forest	3 - 0	Halifax	Long Eaton
14:00 GMT	Louanne Worsey 73', 90'; Holly Manders 80'; Becky Anderson (yellow card)	Report	Meg Boydell (yellow card)	Stadium: Grange Park; Attendance: 330

14 March 2024 18	Nottingham Forest	2 - 1	Huddersfield Town	Long Eaton
19:45 GMT	Holly Manders 45+1', 66'; Lyndsey Harkin (yellow card)	Report	Yasmin Mason 76'	Stadium: Grange Park; Attendance: 308

31 March 2024 20	Derby County	1 - 1	Nottingham Forest	Derby
14:00 BST	Rebecca May 47'; Sarah Jackson (yellow card)	Report	Charlotte Greengrass 65'; Sophie Domingo (yellow card)	Stadium: Pride Park Stadium; Attendance: 2289

07 April 2024 21	Stourbridge	0 - 2	Nottingham Forest	Amblecote
14:00 BST	Hannah Fishwick (yellow card)	Report	Charlotte Greengrass 4', 25'	Stadium: War Memorial Athletic Ground; Attendance: 186

11 April 2024 8	Huddersfield Town	0 - 2	Nottingham Forest	Kirkburton
19:45 BST	Rebecca Beresford (yellow card)	Report	Freya Thomas 61'; Sophie Domingo 80'	Stadium: Stafflex Arena; Attendance: 78
Note: Match postponed from 12 October 2023 and from 14 December 2023

21 April 2024 17	Wolverhampton Wanderers	4 - 3	Nottingham Forest	Telford
14:00 BST	Amber Hughes 59'; Beth Merrick 71', 90+3'; Olivia Fergusson 90' (yellow card); Tammi George (yellow card); Anna Morphet (yellow card); Eloise Jayne Wilson (yellow card)	Report	Louanne Worsey 10'; Sophie Domingo 45'; Holly Manders 58'; Lyndsey Harkin (yellow card); Freya Thomas (yellow card)	Stadium: New Bucks Head; Attendance: 354
Note: Match postponed from 10 March 2024

25 April 2024 9	Halifax	2 - 1	Nottingham Forest	Shirebrook
19:45 BST	Meg Boydell; Ellie White	Report	Freya Thomas 8'	Stadium: Langwith Road; Attendance: 118
Note: Match postponed from 21 October 2023 and from 24 March 2024

05 May 2024 22	Nottingham Forest	2 - 0	Stoke City	Long Eaton
14:00 BST	Holly Manders 14'; Natalie Johnson 30'; Abi Louise Cowie (yellow card)	Report		Stadium: Grange Park; Attendance: 590

=== Women's FA Cup ===
==== Matches ====
Win Draw Loss Fixtures

12 November 2023 1	Nottingham Forest	7 - 0	Sheffield	Long Eaton
13:00 GMT	Louanne Worsey 28', 50'; Freya Thomas 48'; Niamh Reynolds 61', 90'; Alice Keitley 72'; Charlotte Greengrass 88'	Report		Stadium: Grange Park

26 November 2023 2	Nottingham Forest	3 - 2	Sporting Khalsa	Long Eaton
14:00 GMT	Mai Moncaster 23'; Sophie Domingo 39'; Louanne Worsey 41'; Chloe Leigh Dixon (yellow card)	Report	Olivia Stubbs 43'; Leonie Joyce 83'; Skye Owen (yellow card); Lowri Walker (yellow card)	Stadium: Grange Park; Attendance: 175

10 December 2023 3	Nottingham Forest	3 - 1	Boldmere St. Michaels	Long Eaton
14:00 GMT	Natalie Johnson 3'; Mai Moncaster 42'; Louanne Worsey 45'	Report	Jade Formaston 72'	Stadium: Grange Park

14 January 2024 4	Plymouth Argyle	1 - 6	Nottingham Forest	Plymouth
13:00 GMT	Jade Berrow 89'; Rebecca Dandridge (yellow card); Kathryn Dickson (yellow card)	Report	Louanne Worsey 16', 45+2'; Holly Manders 49'; Sophie Domingo 57'; Mai Moncaster 75'; Mollie Green 78'; Natalie Johnson (yellow card)	Stadium: Home Park; Attendance: 1844

11 February 2024 5	Nottingham Forest	1 - 7	Everton	Long Eaton
14:00 GMT	Charlotte Greengrass 48'; Sophie Domingo (yellow card); Ella Haughey (yellow card)	Report	Kathrine Møller Kühl 23'; Martina Piemonte 33'; Justine Vanhaevermaet 52'; Emily Batty 73' (o.g.); Emma Bissell 84'; Toni Duggan 88' (pen.); Hanna Bennison 90+4'	Stadium: Grange Park; Attendance: 1130; Referee: Phoebe Cross

=== FA Women's National League Cup ===
==== Matches ====
Win Draw Loss Fixtures

27 August 2023 Determining	Solihull Moors	0 - 5	Nottingham Forest	Studley
15:00 BST		Report	Chloe Leigh Dixon 5'; Holly Manders 27', 37'; Mollie Green 82', 83'	Stadium: Studley Sports Centre

01 October 2023 1	Nottingham Forest	2 - 0	Wolverhampton Wanderers	Long Eaton
14:00 BST	Holly Manders 12', 83'; Freya Thomas (yellow card)	Report	Sophie Bramford (yellow card); Tammi George (yellow card)	Stadium: Grange Park; Attendance: 215

29 October 2023 2	Newcastle United	3 - 0	Nottingham Forest	Newcastle upon Tyne
14:00 GMT	Georgia Gibson 26'; Amber-Keegan Stobbs 38'; Kacie Elson 12'	Report	Louanne Worsey (yellow card); Natalie Johnson (yellow card)	Stadium: Leisure United Bullocksteads; Attendance: 100

== Statistics ==
As of 25 July 2024

=== Overall ===
No.	Pos.	Player	League				FA Cup				League Cup				Total			
No.	Pos.	Player		Goal	Yellow card	Red card		Goal	Yellow card	Red card		Goal	Yellow card	Red card		Goal	Yellow card	Red card
1	GK	Emily Batty	22	0	1	0	3	0	0	0	3	0	0	0	28	0	1	0
2	DF	Lyndsey Harkin	22	0	2	0	4	0	0	0	3	0	0	0	29	0	2	0
3	DF	Natalie Johnson	21	6	1	0	4	1	1	0	3	0	1	0	28	7	3	0
5	DF	Olivia Cook	9 (5)	0	0	0	2 (1)	0	0	0	2 (1)	0	0	0	13 (7)	0	0	0
6	MF	Lauren McMurchie	0 (1)	0	0	0	0	0	0	0	0	0	0	0	0 (1)	0	0	0
7	FW	Sophie Domingo	16 (4)	7	1	0	5	2	1	0	0 (1)	0	0	0	21 (5)	9	2	0
8	FW	Mai Moncaster	13 (9)	4	1	0	3 (2)	3	0	0	2 (1)	0	0	0	18 (12)	7	1	0
10	MF	Holly Manders	22	11	2	0	3	1	0	0	3	4	0	0	28	16	2	0
11	DF	Chloe Leigh Dixon	3 (6)	1	0	0	1 (4)	0	1	0	1 (2)	1	0	0	5 (12)	2	0	0
12	MF	Niamh Reynolds	0 (7)	1	0	0	2 (2)	2	0	0	0 (2)	0	0	0	2 (11)	3	0	0
14	FW	Louanne Worsey	10 (6)	8	1	1	5	6	0	0	1	0	1	0	16 (6)	14	2	1
15	DF	Laura-Jayne O'Neill	1 (3)	0	0	0	0 (1)	0	0	0	1 (2)	0	0	0	2 (6)	0	0	0
16	MF	Mollie Green	17 (1)	1	1	1	4	1	0	0	2 (1)	2	0	0	23 (2)	4	1	1
17	MF	Freya Thomas	21	4	2	0	4	1	0	0	3	0	1	0	28	5	3	0
18	GK	Aja Aguirre	0	0	0	0	2	0	0	0	0	0	0	0	2	0	0	0
19	MF	Becky Anderson	22	0	3	0	5	0	0	0	3	0	0	0	30	0	3	0
21	DF	Hayley James	4 (1)	0	0	0	0	0	0	0	2	0	0	0	6 (1)	0	0	0
22	FW	Charlotte Greengrass	17 (2)	13	1	0	2 (2)	2	0	0	2	0	0	0	21 (4)	15	1	0
24	DF	Ella Haughey	3 (5)	0	1	0	3 (1)	0	1	0	0	0	0	0	6 (6)	0	2	0
25	MF	Alice Keitley	3 (2)	3	0	0	1 (3)	1	0	0	0	0	0	0	4 (5)	4	0	0
32	DF	Abi Louise Cowie	16 (2)	0	5	0	2	0	0	0	2	0	0	0	20 (2)	0	5	0
34	GK	Holly Mears	0	0	0	0	0	0	0	0	0	0	0	0	0	0	0	0
36	MF	Lily Stevenson	0 (1)	0	0	0	0	0	0	0	0	0	0	0	0 (1)	0	0	0

=== Goalscorers ===
Rank	No.	Pos.	Player	League	FA Cup	League Cup	Total
1	10	MF	Holly Manders	11	1	4	16
2	22	FW	Charlotte Greengrass	13	2	0	15
3	14	FW	Louanne Worsey	8	6	0	14
4	7	FW	Sophie Domingo	7	2	0	9
5	3	DF	Natalie Johnson	6	1	0	7
5	8	FW	Mai Moncaster	4	3	0	7
7	17	MF	Freya Thomas	4	1	0	5
8	16	MF	Mollie Green	1	1	2	4
8	25	MF	Alice Keitley	3	1	0	4
10	12	MF	Niamh Reynolds	1	2	0	3
11	11	DF	Chloe Leigh Dixon	1	0	1	2
Totals				59	20	7	86

=== Assists ===
Rank	No.	Pos.	Player	League	FA Cup	League Cup	Total
1	7	FW	Sophie Domingo	13	5	0	18
2	22	FW	Charlotte Greengrass	4	2	0	6
2	8	FW	Mai Moncaster	4	0	2	6
4	17	MF	Freya Thomas	3	1	1	5
5	19	MF	Becky Anderson	2	1	1	4
5	16	MF	Mollie Green	4	0	0	4
5	10	MF	Holly Manders	4	0	0	4
5	14	FW	Louanne Worsey	2	2	0	4
9	32	DF	Abi Louise Cowie	2	0	0	2
9	11	DF	Chloe Leigh Dixon	1	0	1	2
9	2	DF	Lyndsey Harkin	2	0	0	2
9	24	DF	Ella Haughey	0	2	0	2
9	21	DF	Hayley James	2	0	0	2
9	3	DF	Natalie Johnson	1	1	0	2
9	25	MF	Alice Keitley	0	2	0	2
16	5	DF	Olivia Cook	1	0	0	1
Totals				45	16	5	66

=== Clean sheets ===
Rank	No.	Pos.	Player	League	FA Cup	League Cup	Total
1	1	GK	Emily Batty	9	0	2	11
2	18	GK	Aja Aguirre	0	1	0	1
Totals				9	1	2	12

=== Hat-tricks ===
Player	Against	Result	Date	Competition	Ref.
Charlotte Greengrass	Stourbridge (H)	7 – 0	20 August 2023	WNL Northern Premier Division	
Charlotte Greengrass	Liverpool Feds (H)	5 – 0	15 October 2023	WNL Northern Premier Division	

== Awards ==
=== e-on Player of the Month ===
Awarded by an online vote of supporters on the official Nottingham Forest F.C. website.

Month	Player	Ref.
April	Freya Thomas	
March	Holly Manders	
February	Natalie Johnson	
January	Alice Keitley	
