= 2023–24 FA Women's National League Cup =

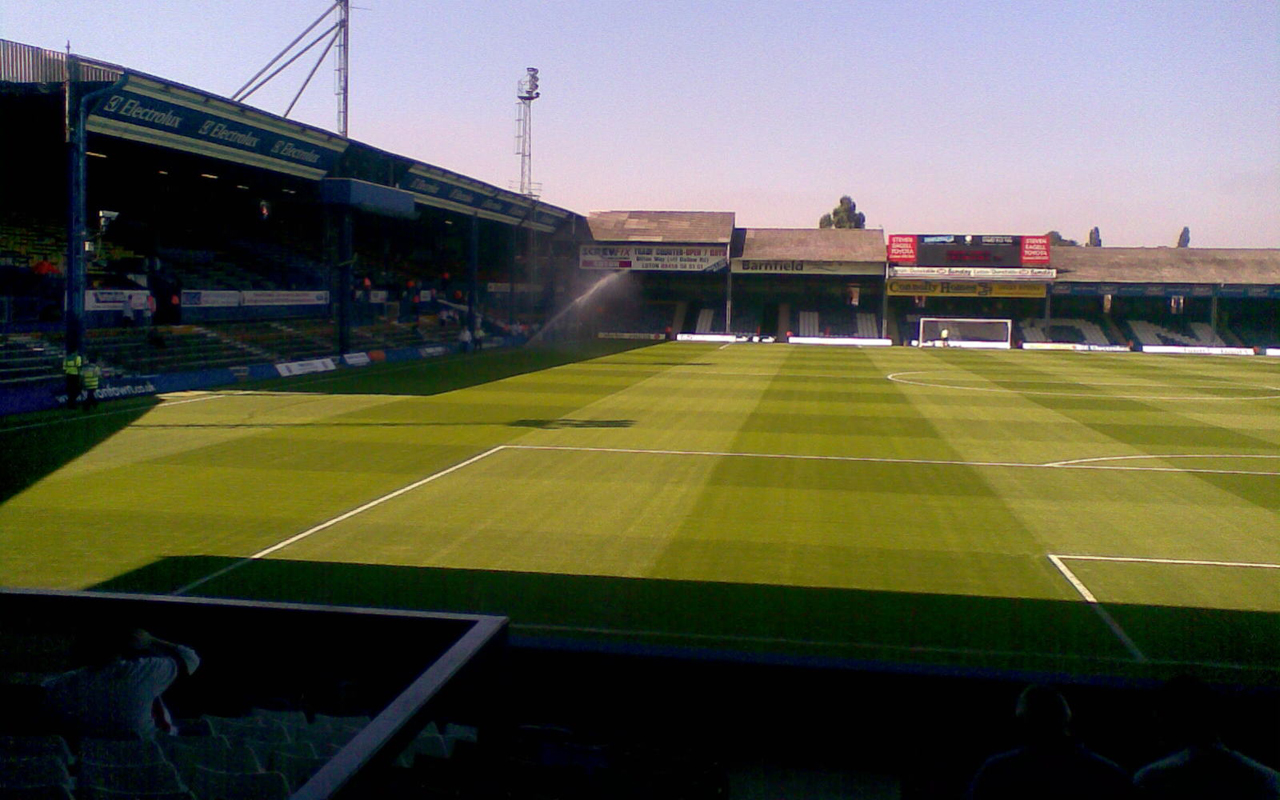
- Kenilworth Road hosted the final

Tournament details
- Country: England; Wales
- Dates: 27 August 2023 – 23 March 2024
- Teams: 72

Final positions
- Champions: Hashtag United (1st title)
- Runners-up: Newcastle United

Tournament statistics
- Matches played: 69
- Goals scored: 281 (4.07 per match)
- All statistics correct as of 23 March 2024.

The 2023–24 FA Women's National League Cup was the 32nd running of the FA Women's National League Cup, which began in 1991. It is the major league cup competition run by the FA Women's National League, and is run alongside their secondary league cup competition, the National League Plate.

All 72 National League clubs entered at the Determining round, with the winners continuing in the competition and the losers going into the National League Plate tournament.

Nottingham Forest were the defending champions, but were eliminated by Newcastle United in the second round.

The final was played at Kenilworth Road on 23 March 2024 between Hashtag United and Newcastle United. Hashtag United secured a 2–1 win to claim their first title.

== Results ==
All results listed are published by The Football Association. Games are listed by round in chronological order, and then in alphabetical order of the home team where matches were played simultaneously.

The division each team play in is indicated in brackets after their name: (S)=Southern Division; (N)=Northern Division; (SW1)=South West Division One; (SE1)=South East Division One; (M1)=Midlands Division One; (N1)=Northern Division One.

=== Determining round ===
27 August 2023	Actonians (SE1)	1–4	Swindon Town (SW1)	Northolt
14:00	Dredge	Report	Colston 45', 50', 87'; Beck-Esson 88'	Stadium: Rectory Park

27 August 2023	AFC Bournemouth (SW1)	2–0	Bridgwater United (SW1)	Ringwood
14:00	Buckingham 75'; James 86'	Report		Stadium: Long Lane; Attendance: 424

27 August 2023	AFC Fylde (N)	2–1	Chorley (N1)	Warton
14:00	Strutton; Hamill	Report	Tyers	Stadium: Kellamergh Park

27 August 2023	AFC Wimbledon (SE1)	2–0	Chatham Town (S)	Carshalton
14:00	Martins 88'; Dorey 90+4'	Report		Stadium: Colston Avenue

27 August 2023	Barnsley (N1)	2–3	Peterborough United (M1)	Sheffield
14:00	Housecroft; Stuart	Report	Scargill 20'; Axten 90', 90+2'	Stadium: Olympic Legacy Park

27 August 2023	Boldmere St. Michaels (M1)	3–0	Lincoln City (M1)	Sutton Coldfield
14:00	Goal	Report		Stadium: Trevor Brown Memorial Ground

27 August 2023	Cambridge City (SE1)	2–1	Southampton Women (SW1)	Haverhill
14:00	Hubbard; Wood	Report	Jeal 85'	Stadium: The New Croft; Attendance: 75

27 August 2023	Cambridge United (SE1)	0–5	Norwich City (SE1)	St Neots
14:00		Report	Drake; Snelling; Shaw	Stadium: Rowley Park

27 August 2023	Cardiff City Ladies (S)	3–1	AFC Sudbury (SE1)	Cardiff
14:00	Williams 25'; Horrell 40'; Bartlett 70'	Report	Frazzoni	Stadium: Amdani Hi Arena

27 August 2023	Cheltenham Town (S)	3–0	Maidenhead United (SW1)	Bishop's Cleeve
14:00	Poole 16', 45+1'; Owen 27'	Report		Stadium: Kayte Lane

27 August 2023	Chester-le-Street Town (N1)	2–2 (a.e.t.) (2–3 p)	Notts County (M1)	Chester-le-Street
14:00	Hockaday; Jamieson	Report	Brett 65'; Crump 90+3'	Stadium: Moor Park

27 August 2023	Derby County (N)	2–4	West Bromwich Albion (N)	Mickleover
14:00	Sims 15'; Mosby 59'	Report	Orthodoxou; George; Bennett-Steele; Mahmood	Stadium: Mickleover Sports Club; Attendance: 286

27 August 2023	Durham Cestria (N1)	2–1	Leafield Athletic (M1)	Durham
14:00	Dale 44'; Clarke-Mainwaring 79'	Report	Joyce 31'	Stadium: The Graham Sports Centre

27 August 2023	Exeter City (SW1)	1–4	Plymouth Argyle (S)	Exeter
14:00	Zuurmond 49'	Report	Sara 35', 43', 45'; Whitmore 68'	Stadium: Exwick Sports Hub; Attendance: 503

27 August 2023	F.C. United of Manchester (N1)	1–6	Halifax (N)	Moston
14:00	Ritchie 50'	Report	Stevens; Dean; Sowerby; Wilson	Stadium: Broadhurst Park; Attendance: 113

27 August 2023	Haywards Heath Town (SE1)	0–4	Rugby Borough (S)	Haywards Heath
14:00		Report	Greenslade 68', 90+3'; Potts 78'; Wiseman 90+2'	Stadium: Hanbury Park Stadium

27 August 2023	Huddersfield Town (N)	5–3	Middlesbrough (N1)	Kirkburton
14:00	Abdullahi 3', 80'; Nsangou 28'; O'Connor 51'; Sanderson 72'	Report	Ward; Robson; Donzo	Stadium: The Stafflex Arena; Attendance: 79

27 August 2023	Ipswich Town (S)	4–2	Billericay Town (S)	Felixstowe
14:00	Thomas; Peskett; Hughes	Report	Blackie; Jones	Stadium: Town Ground; Attendance: 386

27 August 2023	Keynsham Town (SW1)	1–2	Queens Park Rangers (SE1)	Keynsham
14:00	Vipond 57'	Report	Searle; Hill	Stadium: Crown Field

27 August 2023	Leek Town (M1)	1–4	Leeds United (N1)	Leek
14:00	Weston 85'	Report	Ellis 34'; Brown 39'	Stadium: Harrison Park; Attendance: 100

27 August 2023	London Bees (S)	3–1	London Seaward (SE1)	Edgware
14:00	Beaufort; O'Leary	Report	Long	Stadium: The Hive

27 August 2023	Milton Keynes Dons (S)	7–0	Selsey (SW1)	Milton Keynes
14:00	Mclean; Beaver; Dolling; Attenborough; Coupar; Rush; Stovold	Report		Stadium: Fairfields Sports Hub

27 August 2023	Moneyfields (SW1)	1–0	Torquay United (SW1)	Fareham
14:00	Wilson-Wilton 90+2'	Report		Stadium: Cams Alders Stadium; Attendance: 67

27 August 2023	Newcastle United (N)	3–2 (a.e.t.)	Burnley (N)	Kingston Park
14:00	Galloway 16', 93'; Ferguson 118'	Report	Ravening 46'; Embley 107'	Stadium: Kingston Park

27 August 2023	Northampton Town (M1)	0–3	Stoke City (N)	Northampton
14:00		Report	Holder 10', 44'; Logan 34'	Stadium: Fernie Fields

27 August 2023	Norton & Stockton Ancients (N1)	0–4	Liverpool Feds (N)	Stockton-on-Tees
14:00		Report	Thomas 6'; Fletcher 12'; Cole 48', 77'	Stadium: Norton Sports Complex

27 August 2023	Oxford United (S)	5–0	Abingdon United (SW1)	Marston
14:00	Barratt 7', 14', 15'; Sherwood 23'; Swaby 90'	Report		Stadium: Marsh Lane

27 August 2023	Portishead Town (SW1)	0–3	Worthing (SE1)	Portishead
14:00		Report	Quayle 13', 40', 45'	Stadium: Bristol Road

27 August 2023	Solihull Moors (M1)	0–5	Nottingham Forest (N)	Studley
15:00		Report	Dixon 5'; Manders 27', 37'; Green 82', 83'	Stadium: Studley Sports Centre

27 August 2023	Sporting Khalsa (M1)	3–0	Hull City (N1)	Willenhall
14:00	Clark 20'; Smith 24'; Austin-Short 90+4'	Report		Stadium: Guardian Warehousing Arena; Attendance: 61

27 August 2023	Stockport County (N1)	1–1 (a.e.t.) (4–1 p)	Sheffield F.C. (M1)	Stockport
14:00	Owen 89'	Report	Nelson 63'	Stadium: Stockport Sports Village; Attendance: 88

27 August 2023	Stourbridge (N)	4–1	York City (N1)	Stourbridge
14:00	Ireson-Lawrence 5', 62'; Lowe 41'; Deasy 90+10'	Report	Ash 15'	Stadium: War Memorial Athletic Ground

27 August 2023	Sutton Coldfield Town (M1)	2–7	Loughborough Lightning (M1)	Sutton Coldfield
14:00	Farquharson 37'; Civil 69'	Report	Powell 24', 43'; Purchase 50', 77'; Hewitt 76', 81'; Edwards 88'	Stadium: Central Ground; Attendance: 74

27 August 2023	Wolverhampton Wanderers (N)	11–1	Doncaster Rovers Belles (N1)	Compton
14:00	Hughes; Toussaint; George; Morphet; Merrick; Wilson; Fryer	Report	Tugby-Andrew	Stadium: Sir Jack Hayward Training Ground; Attendance: 243

Chesham United (SE1)	A–W	Hashtag United (S)
	Report

=== Preliminary round ===
10 September 2023	Halifax (N)	4–2	Sporting Khalsa (M1)	Cleckheaton
14:00	White; Sowerby; Oliver	Report	Cann 26'; Austin-Short 63'	Stadium: Clayborn Ground; Attendance: 73

10 September 2023	Loughborough Lightning (M1)	0–1 (a.e.t.)	Durham Cestria (N1)	Loughborough
14:30		Report	Giles 102'	Stadium: Holywell Sports Complex

10 September 2023	Queens Park Rangers (SE1)	3–3 (a.e.t.) (4–5 p)	Moneyfields (SW1)	Perivale
14:00	Stanley; Searle	Report	Sitarz 56'; Taylor 69', 102'	Stadium: Powerday Stadium

10 September 2023	Swindon Town (SW1)	4–2	AFC Wimbledon (SE1)	Swindon
14:00	Strippel 24', 77'; Colston 45', 85'	Report	Goddard 45+4'; Hincks 53'	Stadium: County Ground; Attendance: 309

=== First round ===
1 October 2023	AFC Bournemouth (SW1)	1–2 (a.e.t.)	Norwich City (SE1)	Ringwood
15:00	Cooper 71'	Report	Symonds; Lawrence	Stadium: Long Lane

1 October 2023	Boldmere St. Michaels (M1)	1–2	Newcastle United (N)	Sutton Coldfield
15:00	Maia 75'	Report	Milne-Redhead 75'; Galloway 90+2'	Stadium: Trevor Brown Memorial Ground

1 October 2023	Cambridge City (SE1)	0–6	Milton Keynes Dons (S)	Haverhill
14:00		Report	Mclean; Biggadike; Mitchell; Dolling	Stadium: The New Croft; Attendance: 69

1 October 2023	Cardiff City Ladies (S)	3–1	Plymouth Argyle (S)	Cardiff
14:00	Williams; Lloyd; Sargent	Report	O'Shea 20'	Stadium: Amdani Hi Arena

1 October 2023	Durham Cestria (N1)	2–1	Stockport County (N1)	Sunderland
14:00	Neuefeind 2'; Coulson 61'	Report	Gillin 69'	Stadium: Sunderland Ford Hub

1 October 2023	Halifax (N)	2–0	Stoke City (N)	Cleckheaton
14:00	White	Report		Stadium: Clayborn Ground; Attendance: 107

1 October 2023	Hashtag United (S)	2–0	Oxford United (S)	Aveley
15:00	Gille 5'; Rowland 50'	Report		Stadium: Parkside; Attendance: 52

1 October 2023	Liverpool Feds (N)	2–3	West Bromwich Albion (N)	Liverpool
14:00	Donoghue 28'; Pope 61'	Report	Orthodoxou; Mahmood; Warner	Stadium: Jericho Lane

1 October 2023	London Bees (S)	1–0	Worthing (SE1)	Edgware
14:00	O'Leary 90'	Report		Stadium: The Hive

1 October 2023	Moneyfields (SW1)	1–7	Portsmouth (S)	Fareham
14:00	Wilson-Wilton 51'	Report	Pitman 4', 60', 82'; Lane 15'; Quirk 46'; Humphrey 76'; Scott 80'	Stadium: Cams Alders Stadium

1 October 2023	Nottingham Forest (N)	2–0	Wolverhampton Wanderers (N)	Long Eaton
14:00	Manders 12', 83'	Report		Stadium: Grange Park

1 October 2023	Notts County (M1)	0–6	AFC Fylde (N)	Hucknall
14:00		Report	Lackey; Siddall; Heria; Murphy	Stadium: RM Stadium

1 October 2023	Peterborough United (M1)	0–2	Leeds United (N1)	Bourne
14:00		Report	Rousseau 49'; Dobson 90+6'	Stadium: Abbey Lawn; Attendance: 453

1 October 2023	Rugby Borough (S)	3–0	Swindon Town (SW1)	Rugby
15:00	Greenslade 14'; Nixon 66'; Morris 71'	Report		Stadium: Nationwide Windows Arena

1 October 2023	Stourbridge (N)	0–2	Huddersfield Town (N)	Stourbridge
14:00		Report	Nsangou 50'; Mason 55'	Stadium: War Memorial Athletic Ground

Ipswich Town (S)	H–W	Cheltenham Town (S)
	Report

=== Second round ===
29 October 2023	AFC Fylde (N)	4–2	Durham Cestria (N1)	Warton
14:00	Lackey; Strutton	Report	Clarke-Mainwaring 71', 78'	Stadium: Kellamergh Park

29 October 2023	Hashtag United (S)	2–1	Rugby Borough (S)	Aveley
14:00	Williams 4'; West 90'	Report	Greenslade 62'	Stadium: Parkside; Attendance: 59

29 October 2023	Leeds United (N1)	3–4	Halifax (N)	Garforth
14:00	Astle 72'; Rousseau 85', 87'	Report	Boydell; Willis; Legge	Stadium: Bannister Prentice Stadium

29 October 2023	London Bees (S)	2–0	Norwich City (SE1)	Edgware
14:00	Bensted; Potter	Report		Stadium: The Hive

29 October 2023	Milton Keynes Dons (S)	0–1	Portsmouth (S)	Milton Keynes
14:00		Report	Jones 75'	Stadium: Fairfields Sports Hub

29 October 2023	Newcastle United (N)	3–0	Nottingham Forest (N)	Gateshead
14:00	Gibson 26'; Stobbs 38'; Elson 90'	Report		Stadium: Gateshead International Stadium; Attendance: 100

29 October 2023	West Bromwich Albion (N)	3–4	Huddersfield Town (N)	Birmingham
13:30	Jhamat; Orthodoxou	Report	Fletcher 28'; Abdullahi 45', 58'; Nsangou 55'	Stadium: BCFA Excellence Arena

5 November 2023	Cardiff City Ladies (S)	0–2	Ipswich Town (S)	Cardiff
14:00		Report	Horwood; Thomas	Stadium: Amdani Hi Arena

=== Quarter-finals ===
28 January 2024	AFC Fylde (N)	1–4	Newcastle United (N)	Warton
14:00	Rowe	Report	Gibson 24', 70'; Dodds 50', 63'	Stadium: Kellamergh Park

28 January 2024	Halifax (N)	3–2	Huddersfield Town (N)	Cleckheaton
14:00	Sanderson; White; Sowerby	Report	Walton 23'; Mason 43'	Stadium: Clayborn Ground; Attendance: 223

28 January 2024	Hashtag United (S)	3–1	London Bees (S)	Aveley
14:00	Gillard 24'; Fronc 60'; Gille 89'	Report	Goal	Stadium: Parkside; Attendance: 62

28 January 2024	Ipswich Town (S)	1–2 (a.e.t.)	Portsmouth (S)	Felixstowe
14:00	Horwood	Report	Quirk 29'; Barrett 94'	Stadium: Town Ground

=== Semi-finals ===
25 February 2024	Halifax (N)	0–2	Hashtag United (S)	Cleckheaton
14:00		Report	Rowland 3', 57'	Stadium: Clayborn Ground; Attendance: 322

25 February 2024	Newcastle United (N)	2–1	Portsmouth (S)	Newcastle upon Tyne
14:00	Potts 52'; Gibson 90'	Report	Jones 64'	Stadium: St James' Park; Attendance: 22,307

=== Final ===
23 March 2024	Newcastle United (N)	1–2	Hashtag United (S)	Luton
14:30	Apindia 16' (o.g.)	Report	Nicholls 18'; Williams 75'	Stadium: Kenilworth Road; Attendance: 3,719
