= Nat Johnson =

English footballer (1887–1963)

Personal information
- Full name: Nathan Victor Johnson
- Date of birth: 1887
- Place of birth: Gateshead, England
- Date of death: November 1963 (aged 75–76)
- Height: 5 ft 11 1/2 in (1.82 m)
- Position: Forward

Senior career*
Years	Team	Apps	(Gls)
1911–1912	Windy Nook		
1912–1914	Grimsby Town	1	(0)
1914–1919	Castleford Town		
1919–1920	Charlton's		
1920–1921	Cleethorpes Town		
1921–192?	Haycroft Rovers		
- * Club domestic league appearances and goals

Nathan Victor Johnson (1887 – 5 November 1963) was an English professional footballer who played as a forward.
