= Alice Keitley =

English footballer (born 2003)

Personal information
- Full name: Alice Keitley
- Date of birth: 4 July 2003 (age 23)
- Place of birth: England
- Position: Midfielder

Senior career*
| Years | Team | Apps | (Gls) |
| 2022–2024 | Aston Villa | 1 | (0) |
| 2023–2024 | → Nottingham Forest (loan) | 5 | (3) |
| 2024–2025 | Nottingham Forest | 0 | (0) |
- * Club domestic league appearances and goals as of 11 August 2024

Alice Keitley (born 4 July 2003) is an English footballer who most recently played as a midfielder for Nottingham Forest in the Women's Super League 2.

== Club career ==
=== Nottingham Forest ===
On 6 October 2023, Keitley joined Nottingham Forest on a dual-registration loan for the 2023/24 season.

On 7 August 2024, after a successful loan spell, Keitley signed for Nottingham Forest permanently.

On 3 May 2025, it was announced that Keitley would leave the club upon the expiry of her contract at the end of the 2024-25 season.

== Career statistics ==
=== Club ===
As of 11 August 2024.

| Club | Season | League | | | National Cup | | League Cup | | Other | | Total | |
| Club | Season | Division | Apps | Goals | Apps | Goals | Apps | Goals | Apps | Goals | Apps | Goals |
|---|---|---|---|---|---|---|---|---|---|---|---|---|
| Aston Villa | 2022-23 | Women's Super League | 1 | 0 | 0 | 0 | 0 (Note: Appearances in the FA Women's League Cup) | 0 | 0 | 0 | 1 | 0 |
| Aston Villa | Total | | 1 | 0 | 0 | 0 | 0 | 0 | 0 | 0 | 1 | 0 |
| Nottingham Forest | 2023–24 | FA WNL Northern Premier Division | 5 | 3 | 4 | 1 | 0 (Note: Appearances in the FA Women's National League Cup) | 0 | 0 | 0 | 9 | 4 |
| Nottingham Forest | 2024–25 | FA WNL Northern Premier Division | 0 | 0 | 0 | 0 | 0 | 0 | 0 | 0 | 0 | 0 |
| Nottingham Forest | Total | | 5 | 3 | 4 | 1 | 0 | 0 | 0 | 0 | 9 | 4 |
| Career total | | | 6 | 3 | 4 | 1 | 0 | 0 | 0 | 0 | 10 | 4 |
