= Louanne Worsey =

English footballer

Personal information
- Full name: Louanne Marie Worsey
- Date of birth: 18 May 2005 (age 21)
- Place of birth: England
- Positions: Forward; midfielder

Team information
- Current team: Wolverhampton Wanderers
- Number: 36

Senior career*
Years	Team	Apps	(Gls)
2021–2025	Birmingham City	5	(0)
2023–2024	→ Nottingham Forest (loan)	16	(8)
2025	→ Burnley (loan)	9	(0)
2025–	Wolverhampton Wanderers	12	(3)

International career^{‡}
2024	England U19	7	(1)
- * Club domestic league appearances and goals as of 23 February 2026 ‡ National team caps and goals as of 24 July 2024

Louanne Marie Worsey (born 18 May 2005) is an English professional footballer who plays as a forward for Women's Super League 2 side Wolverhampton Wanderers and has represented the England under-19s.

== Club career ==
=== Birmingham City ===
On 7 November 2021, Worsey made her senior debut for Birmingham City in the Women's Super League aged 16 in a 3–0 defeat to Reading during the 2021–22 season.

On 1 July 2023, she signed her first professional contract with Birmingham City, having made a total of 5 appearances in the Women's Super League and Women's Championship.

==== Nottingham Forest (loan) ====
On 16 September 2023, Worsey signed on loan for National League side Nottingham Forest for the 2023–24 season, scoring a total of 14 goals in 22 appearances in all competitions.

On 14 January 2024, for the fourth round of the 2023–24 FA Cup, Worsey was named Player of the Round after scoring two goals against Plymouth Argyle, helping Forest to reach the fifth round. She became joint top scorer remaining in the competition with six goals.

In February 2024 sports writer Suzanne Wrack described Worsey as having thrived at Nottingham Forest, and Livescore labelled her a "teen sensation" after her impressive loan spell being "prolific in front of goal". Worsey has said joining Forest was the best decision for her career.

==== Burnley (loan) ====
On 30 January 2025, Worsey joined Burnley on loan for the remainder of the 2024–25 season.

==== Wolverhampton Wanderers ====
On 26 July 2025, Worsey signed a 12-month part-time contract with Wolverhampton Wanderers. After her signing, manager Dan McNamara described her as "aggressive" and "technically superb".

== International career ==
In 2022 she was called up to the England under-18 youth team.

In April 2024 Worsey was named as part of the England under-19 squad as a midfielder for the second round of 2024 U19 Championship qualification, and played in winning marches against Switzerland and Portugal. In July, with England qualified for the final tournament, she featured in a 10–0 victory over Lithuania as a substitute, and played the full 90 minutes in a 1–1 draw with Serbia.

== Personal life ==
Worsey describes England senior team player Alessia Russo as her inspiration, and aspires to her playing style.

== Honours ==
Birmingham City

- Women's Championship: 2022–23 runner-up

Individual

- FA Cup: 2023–24 (Fourth Round) Player of the Round
