= Jo Torr =

New Zealand artist

Jo Torr (born 1957) is a New Zealand artist. Torr's work explores cultural exchange between European and Polynesian peoples through the lens of costume and textile history.

Exhibitions of note include "Tupaia's Paintbox" at the Michael Hirschfeld Gallery, City Gallery Wellington, 9 September - 9 October 2005. "Nga Kakahu" at the Tauranga Art Gallery from 12 December 2009 - 21 February 2010 which explored the interrelation of Mäori cloaks and European blankets. "The blind idealist's black dog" at the Southland Museum and Art Gallery in 2012 referencing an abortive attempt at colonisation at Erebus Cove, Port Ross, at the northeastern end of Auckland Island in 1849. "Islanders" 2013 at Auckland's Objectspace which exhibited for the first time works from eleven suites of Torr's previously exhibited work, along with brand-new works made for Objectspace. 'Tell Tails: Artists respond to the Turnbull collections' exhibition at the Turnbull Gallery, National Library of New Zealand, 25 May-14 August 2015. Vahine-Wahine from 10 August to 28 August at The People's Gallery Toi ka rere at Tauranga Historic Village which reflects on the position of women through history although gowns are based on European dress styles of the 1770s when Captain James Cook's voyages took place, and point to the similarity in silhouette with Tahitian tapa gift-giving ceremonies.

In addition to Torr's artistic portfolio, her professional credentials include posts as Registrar at the Tauranga Art Gallery and Loans Manager at Te Papa Tongarewa Museum of New Zealand.
