= Amaya Coleman-Evans =

Spanish footballer (born 2003)

Personal information
- Full name: Amaya Midnight Coleman Evans
- Date of birth: 25 December 2003 (age 22)
- Place of birth: Seville, Spain
- Position: Forward

Team information
- Current team: Burnley
- Number: 30

Youth career
- 2015–2017: Oviedo Moderno

Senior career*
Years	Team	Apps	(Gls)
2017–2019	Real Oviedo C		
2019–2021	Real Oviedo B		
2020–2021	Real Oviedo	13	(0)
2022	Blackburn Rovers	1	(0)
2022–	Burnley	18	(3)
- * Club domestic league appearances and goals

Amaya Midnight Coleman Evans (born 25 December 2003), known in England as Amaya Coleman-Evans, is a Spanish professional footballer who plays as a forward for Burnley.

== Club career ==
Amaya Coleman-Evans started her career in Spain playing for Real Oviedo where she earned several first team appearances after coming through the Spanish clubs youth system.

After just two season in Spain, Coleman-Evans signed for Blackburn Rovers in January 2022 after a successful trial with the FA Women's Championship club. In July 2022, it was announced that Coleman-Evans had departed Blackburn Rovers.

In August 2022, Coleman-Evans joined National League club Burnley.

== International career ==
Born in Spain, Coleman-Evans is eligible to feature for both England and Spain at international level.

== Style of play ==
Amaya Coleman-Evans likes to play wide when in attacking positions, taking defenders on in one-on-one situations. She has been known to cross the ball into the box for the striker to attack.
