= Holly Manders =

English footballer (born 2001)

Personal information
- Full name: Holly Jade Manders
- Date of birth: 28 April 2001 (age 25)
- Place of birth: England
- Position: Midfielder

Team information
- Current team: Oxford United

Senior career*
Years	Team	Apps	(Gls)
2017–2019	Middlesbrough	37	(12)
2019–2021	Durham	9	(0)
2021–2023	Sunderland	28	(2)
2023–2025	Nottingham Forest	35	(16)
2025–	Oxford United	0	(0)

International career^{‡}
2018–2019	England U18	4	(4)
2019–2020	England U19	8	(3)
- * Club domestic league appearances and goals as of 8 May 2025 ‡ National team caps and goals as of 28 July 2024

Holly Manders (born 28 April 2001) is an English footballer who plays as a midfielder for Oxford United in the FA Women's National League South.

== Club career ==
=== Middlesbrough ===
Manders made her debut for Middlesbrough in the Northern Premier League on 20 August 2017, as a substitute in a 3–0 loss against AFC Fylde. She scored her first goal for the club on 14 September, in a 4–0 win against West Bromwich Albion. Manders signed for Durham on 11 August 2019.

=== Nottingham Forest ===
On 2 August 2023, Manders signed for Nottingham Forest.

On 11 July 2024, Manders signed a new one-year deal to extend her stay at Nottingham Forest.

On 3 May 2025, it was announced that Manders would leave the club upon the expiry of her contract at the end of the 2024-25 season.

== International career ==
In July 2019 Manders featured for the England U18 team in a trio of games against Canada and Northern Ireland.

In October 2019 Manders played in all three England U19 2020 UEFA Women's Under-19 Championship qualification matches scoring 2 goals.

In March 2020 Manders played in all three England U19 matches at the La Manga Tournament scoring 1 goal.

== Career statistics ==
=== Club ===
As of 13 July 2025.

Club	Season	League			National Cup		League Cup		Other		Total	
Club	Season	Division	Apps	Goals	Apps	Goals	Apps	Goals	Apps	Goals	Apps	Goals
Middlesbrough	2017–18	FA WNL Northern Premier Division	20	5	0	0	2 (Note: Appearances in the FA Women's National League Cup)	0	0	0	22	5
Middlesbrough	2018–19	FA WNL Northern Premier Division	17	7	0	0	1	0	1 (Note: Appearances in the FA Women's National League Plate)	0	19	7
Middlesbrough	Total		37	12	0	0	3	0	1	0	41	12
Durham	2019–20	Women's Championship	9	0	0	0	4 (Note: Appearances in the FA Women's League Cup)	1	0	0	13	1
Durham	2020–21	Women's Championship	0	0	0	0	0	0	0	0	0	0
Durham	Total		9	0	0	0	4	1	0	0	13	1
Sunderland	2021–22	Women's Championship	20	2	1	0	4	1	0	0	25	3
Sunderland	2022–23	Women's Championship	8	0	0	0	3	0	0	0	11	0
Sunderland	Total		28	2	1	0	7	1	0	0	36	3
Nottingham Forest	2023–24	FA WNL Northern Premier Division	22	11	3	1	3	4	0	0	28	16
Nottingham Forest	2024–25	FA WNL Northern Premier Division	13	5	4	1	3	0	0	0	20	6
Nottingham Forest	Total		35	16	7	2	6	4	0	0	48	22
Career total			109	30	8	4	20	6	1	0	138	38
