= Simran Jhamat =

English football player

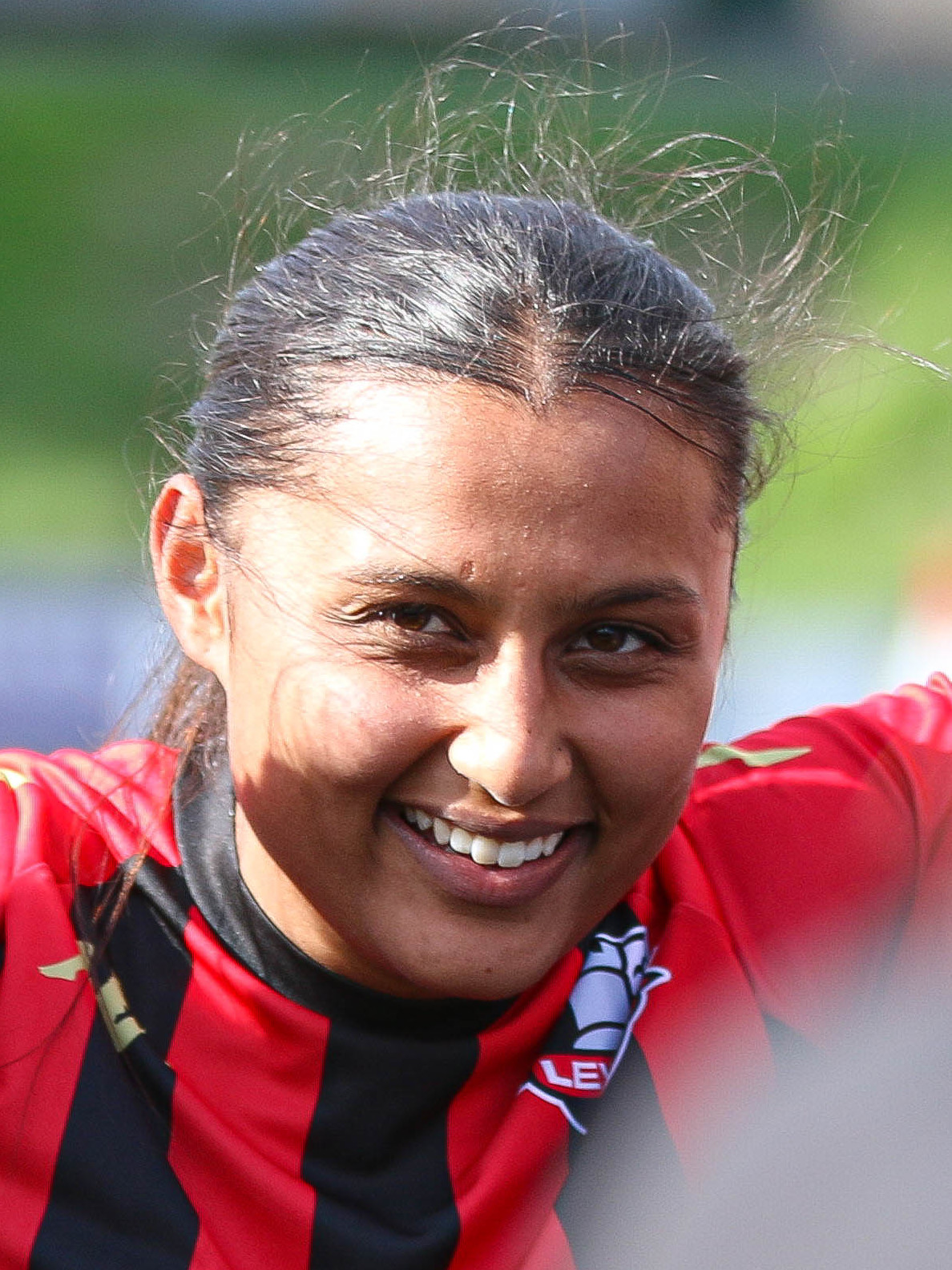
- Jhamat with Lewes in October 2020

Personal information
- Full name: Simran Kaur Jhamat
- Date of birth: 22 January 2001 (age 25)
- Place of birth: England
- Position: Midfielder

Team information
- Current team: West Bromwich Albion
- Number: 8

Youth career
- Sporting Khalsa
- 2009–2017: Aston Villa
- 2017–2018: Liverpool

Senior career*
| Years | Team | Apps | (Gls) |
| 2018–2019 | Liverpool | 2 | (0) |
| 2019–2020 | Leicester City | 12 | (1) |
| 2020 | Coventry United | 2 | (0) |
| 2020–2021 | Lewes | 17 | (1) |
| 2021–2022 | Bristol City | 12 | (2) |
| 2022–2023 | Coventry United | 15 | (1) |
| 2023– | West Bromwich Albion | 9 | (5) |

International career^{‡}
| 2017–2018 | England U17 | 11 | (1) |
| 2018 | England U18 | 5 | (0) |
| 2019–2020 | England U19 | 7 | (0) |
- * Club domestic league appearances and goals as of 27 November 2023 ‡ National team caps and goals as of 14 July 2021

Simran Kaur Jhamat (born 22 January 2001) is an English professional footballer who played as a midfielder in the FA Women's National League North for West Bromwich Albion.

== Early life ==
Jhamat grew up in a Punjabi Sikh family in Walsall. Having previously been told girls couldn't play football while attending Sikh children's activity camps, she started her football career with Sporting Khalsa, before being scouted by Aston Villa. She spent seven seasons at Aston Villa's Girls' Centre of Excellence, then transferred to Liverpool.

== Club career ==
Jhamat started her professional career with Liverpool in the FA Women's Super League. She made her professional debut on 6 January 2019 in a 2–0 defeat against Brighton. Jhamat moved to Leicester City in March 2019, going on to make 13 appearances for the club across all competitions.

In January 2020, Jhamat moved to Coventry United. She made her debut for the club starting in a fourth round FA Cup victory over Southampton. She made two league and two cup appearances for the club before leaving at the end of the season. In August of the same year, Jhamat joined Lewes FC. She became a key member of the club's squad, making 17 appearances and scoring one goal in her one season there.

In 2021, Jhamat became the first British South Asian to play professionally for Bristol City. She scored 13 minutes into her debut for the club in a pre-season friendly against West Bromwich Albion. After a season at Bristol, Jhamat re-signed with Coventry in August 2022.

In September 2023, West Bromwich Albion announced that Jhamat had signed for the club.

== International career ==
Jhamat has represented England at U17, U18 and U19 level. She was the first Punjabi girl to score in a competitive match for England's U-17 side.

== Career statistics ==
As of 7 July 2020.

Club statistics
| Club | Season | League | | | Cup | | League Cup | | Continental | | Other | | Total | |
| Club | Season | Division | Apps | Goals | Apps | Goals | Apps | Goals | Apps | Goals | Apps | Goals | Apps | Goals |
|---|---|---|---|---|---|---|---|---|---|---|---|---|---|---|
| Liverpool | 2018–19 | WSL | 2 | 0 | 0 | 0 | 0 | 0 | — | | 0 | 0 | 2 | 0 |
| Leicester City | 2018–19 | Championship | 3 | 0 | 0 | 0 | 0 | 0 | — | | 0 | 0 | 3 | 0 |
| Leicester City | 2019–20 | Championship | 9 | 1 | 0 | 0 | 4 | 0 | — | | 0 | 0 | 13 | 1 |
| Leicester City | Total | | 12 | 1 | 0 | 0 | 4 | 0 | — | | 0 | 0 | 16 | 1 |
| Coventry United | 2019–20 | Championship | 2 | 0 | 2 | 0 | 0 | 0 | — | | 0 | 0 | 4 | 0 |
| Career total | | | 16 | 1 | 2 | 0 | 4 | 0 | — | | 0 | 0 | 22 | 1 |
