= Emma Jones (footballer, born 1994) =

Welsh footballer born 1994

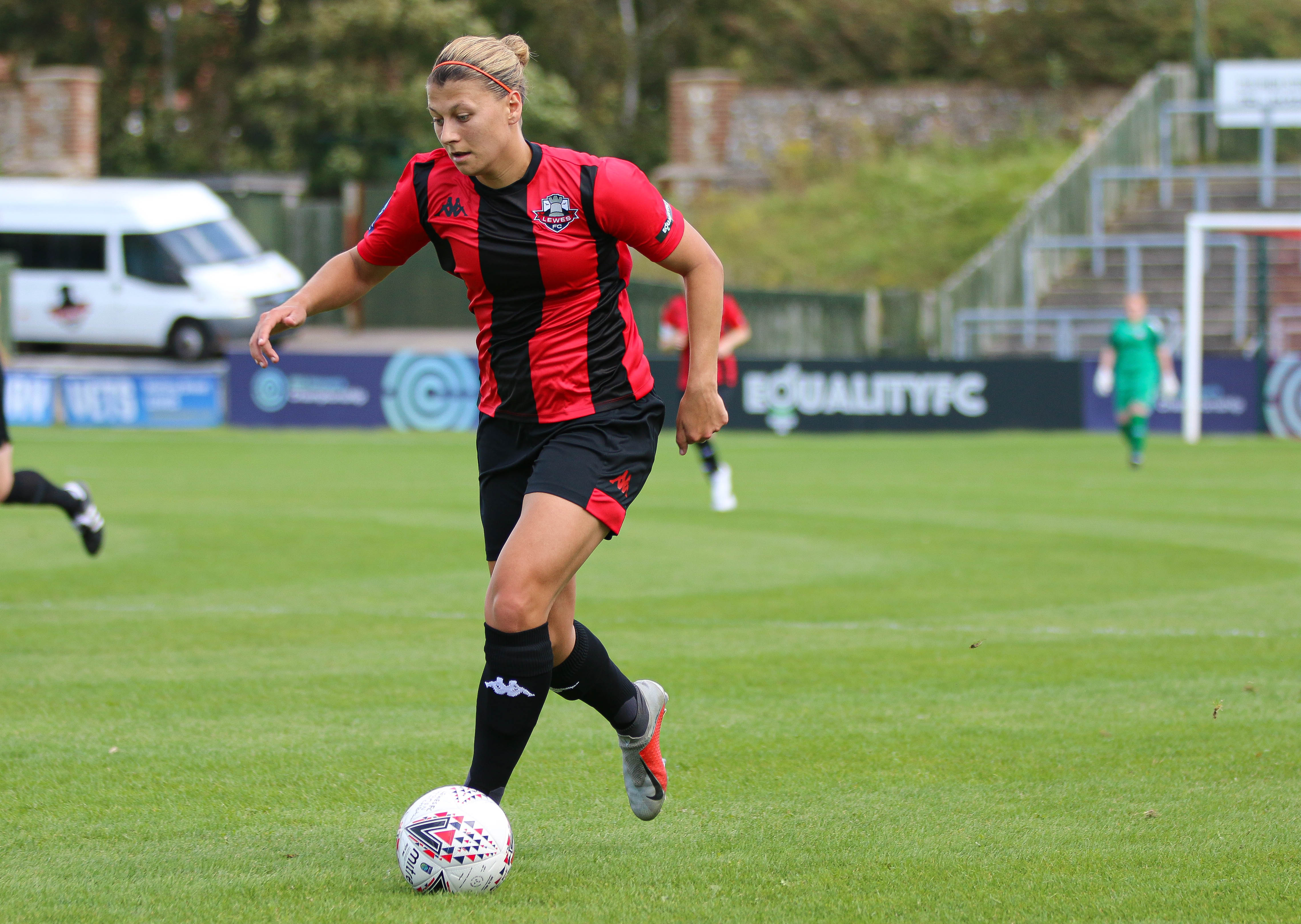
- Emma Jones playing for Lewes in August 2019

Personal information
- Date of birth: 10 October 1994 (age 32)
- Place of birth: Bournemouth, England
- Height: 5 ft 7 in (1.70 m)
- Position: Forward

Team information
- Current team: Portsmouth
- Number: 9

Youth career
- Reading

College career
Years	Team	Apps	(Gls)
2014–2017	Oregon State Beavers	74	(5)

Senior career*
Years	Team	Apps	(Gls)
2018	Linköping	0	(0)
2019	Cardiff City Ladies		(9)
2019–2021	Lewes	22	(1)
2021–	Portsmouth	64	(32)

International career^{‡}
- Wales U17
2013	Wales U19	2	(0)
2019–	Wales	6	(1)
- * Club domestic league appearances and goals as of 15 March 2024 ‡ National team caps and goals as of 15 March 2024

Emma Jones (born 10 October 1994) is a footballer who plays as forward for Portsmouth and the Wales national team.

== Early life ==
Jones was born in Bournemouth. She played youth football at John Madejeski Academy as part of Reading's scholarship programme.

=== Oregon State University ===
Jones played for American university team Oregon State Beavers from 2014 to 2017.

== Club career ==
Jones signed for Swedish club Linköping in 2018 and played in the UEFA Women's Champions League. She then moved to Welsh club Cardiff City Ladies in January 2019 and scored nine goals.

Following her domestic success, Jones signed for English club Lewes FC in June 2019.

Ahead of the 2021/22 season Jones joined English Tier 3 side Portsmouth Women and was given the number 9 shirt. In her debut season for Pompey she scored 5 goals and provided 4 assists in 21 appearances.

In the 2022/23 season Jones made 15 appearances in a season where she suffered a seriously ankle injury limiting her game time. Despite that she still scored 9 Goals and provided 2 assists.

In the 2023/24 season Jones won the Women's Southern Premier Division with Portsmouth Women. During the campaign she played 28 times scoring 18 times and contributing 23 assists.

== International career ==
Although born in England, Jones qualifies to play for Wales through her Cwmbran-born grandfather . She represented Wales at the youth levels, including at the 2013 UEFA Women's Under-19 Championship.

After her success in Sweden, Jones was called up to the senior team and made her international debut in January 2019.

== International goals ==
No.	Date	Venue	Opponent	Score	Result	Competition
1.	29 August 2019	Tórsvøllur, Tórshavn, Faroe Islands	Faroe Islands	2–0	6–0	UEFA Women's Euro 2022 qualifying
