= Bonnie Horwood =

English footballer

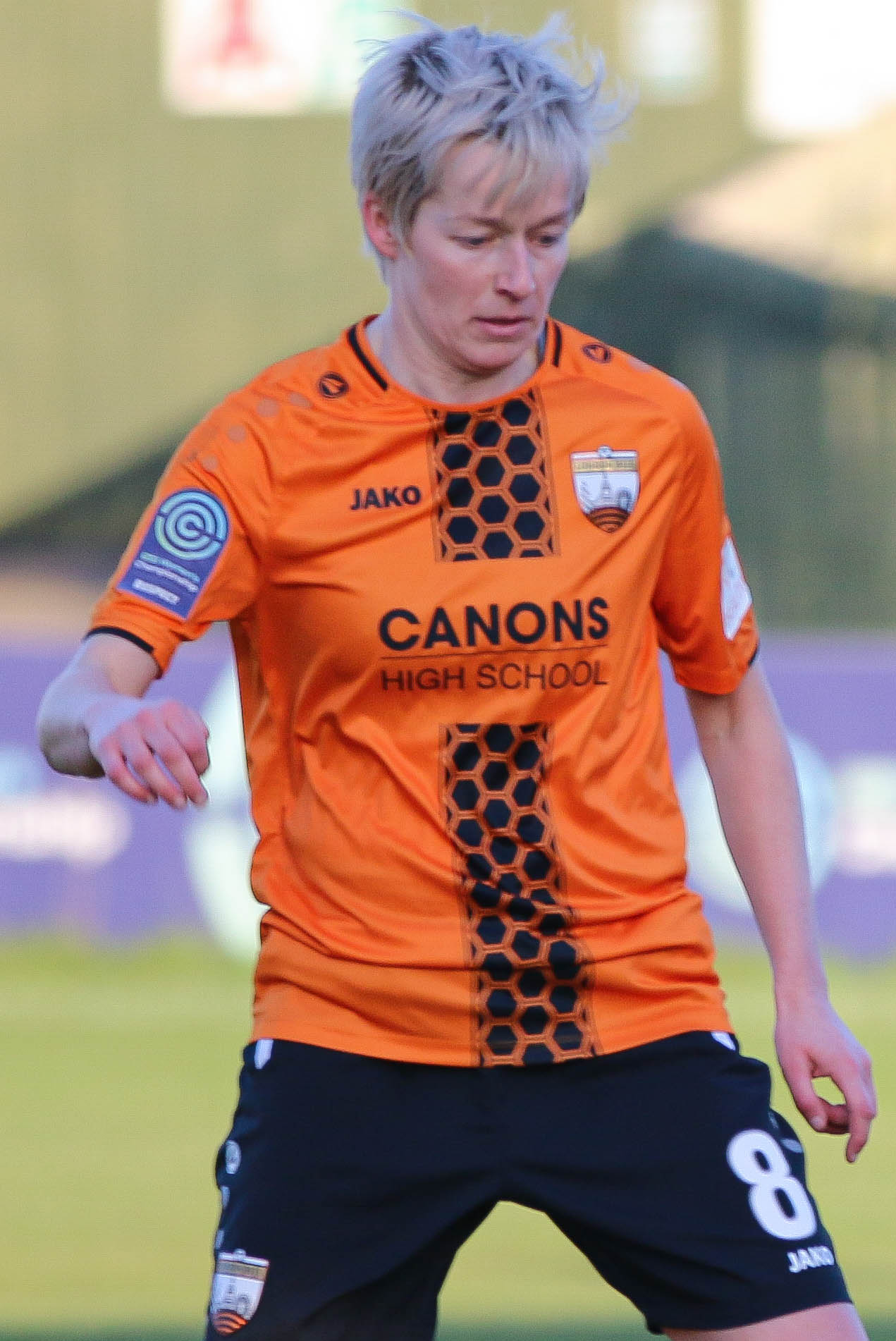
- Horwood in 2019

Personal information
- Full name: Bonnie Elizabeth Horwood
- Date of birth: 16 April 1987 (age 39)
- Place of birth: Rotherham, South Yorkshire, England
- Position: Midfielder

Senior career*
Years	Team	Apps	(Gls)
2011–2013	Lincoln City	26	(3)
2016	Reading	0	(0)
2016–2018	Millwall Lionesses	28	(2)
2018–2019	Yeovil Town	17	(0)
2019–2021	London Bees	22	(1)
2021–2024	Ipswich Town	8	(1)
- * Club domestic league appearances and goals as of 14 June 2020

Bonnie Elizabeth Horwood (born 16 April 1987) is an English footballer who plays as a midfielder. She has previously played for Lincoln City, Reading, Millwall Lionesses, Yeovil Town and Ipswich Town.
