= 2022–23 FA Women's National League =

FA Women's National League
- Season: 2022–23
- Champions: Watford
- Promoted: Watford

The 2022–23 FA Women's National League was the 32nd season of the competition, and the fifth since a restructure and rebranding of the top four tiers of English football by The Football Association. Starting in 1991, it was previously known as the FA Women's Premier League. It sat at the third and fourth levels of the women's football pyramid, below the Women's Championship and above the eight regional football leagues.

The league featured six regional divisions: the Northern and Southern Premier divisions at level three of the pyramid, and Division One North, Division One Midlands, Division One South East, and Division One South West at the fourth level. The league consisted of 72 teams, divided into six divisions of 12 each. At the end of the season the winners of the Northern and Southern Premier divisions qualified for a play-off match to decide the overall National League champion which was promoted to the Women's Championship. The bottom two teams from each were relegated to the appropriate fourth tier FA WNL Division One. The winner of each Division One were promoted to the Northern or Southern Premier Division, with the bottom two teams in those leagues relegated to respective regional leagues.

== Premier Division ==
=== Northern Premier Division ===
FA Women's National League Northern Premier Division
- Season: 2022–23
- Champions: Nottingham Forest
- Relegated: Boldmere St. Michaels; Loughborough Lightning
- Matches: 132
- Goals: 479 (3.63 per match)
- Top goalscorer: Millie Ravening (Burnley) (18 goals)
- Biggest home win: Burnley 7–0 AFC Fylde (22 February 2023)
- Biggest away win: AFC Fylde 1–12 Nottingham Forest (15 January 2023)
- Highest scoring: AFC Fylde 1–12 Nottingham Forest (15 January 2023)

Changes from last season:

- Despite winning the Northern Division, Nottingham Forest lost the Championship play-off and therefore remained in the Premier Division.
- Boldmere St. Michaels were promoted from Division One Midlands as champions.
- Liverpool Feds were promoted from Division One North as champions.
- Middlesbrough were relegated to Division One North.
- Hull City were relegated to Division One North.
- Sheffield were relegated to Division One Midlands.

Club	Home ground	Position 2021–22
AFC Fylde	Kelamergh Park, Warton	3rd
Boldmere St. Michaels	Trevor Brown Memorial Ground, Sutton Coldfield	WNL D1 Midlands, 1st
Brighouse Town	Yorkshire Payments Stadium, Brighouse	7th
Burnley	Lancashire County Ground, Leyland	4th
Derby County	Don Amott Arena, Derby	2nd
Huddersfield Town	The Stafflex Arena, Kirkburton	6th
Liverpool Feds	Jericho Lane, Liverpool	WNL D1 North, 1st
Loughborough Lightning	Loughborough University Stadium, Loughborough	10th
Nottingham Forest	Coronation Park, Eastwood	5th
Stoke City	Norton Cricket Club, Stoke-on-Trent	9th
West Bromwich Albion	Keys Park, Hednesford	8th
Wolverhampton Wanderers	New Bucks Head, Telford	1st

Location of Northern Premier Division clubs for the 2022–23 season

==== League table ====
Pos	Team	Pld	W	D	L	GF	GA	GD	Pts	Promotion or relegation
1	Nottingham Forest (C)	22	17	3	2	81	18	+63	54	Qualification for the Championship play-off
2	Wolverhampton Wanderers	22	17	3	2	61	17	+44	54	
3	Burnley	22	16	4	2	66	28	+38	52	
4	Derby County	22	11	5	6	50	32	+18	38	
5	Brighouse Town	22	8	7	7	28	27	+1	31	
6	Huddersfield Town	22	7	5	10	36	43	−7	26	
7	AFC Fylde	22	7	5	10	24	54	−30	26	
8	West Bromwich Albion	22	7	4	11	28	46	−18	25	
9	Liverpool Feds	22	7	3	12	36	45	−9	24	
10	Stoke City	22	7	3	12	32	49	−17	24	
11	Boldmere St. Michaels (R)	22	5	1	16	27	61	−34	16	Relegation to the Division One Midlands
12	Loughborough Lightning (R)	22	0	3	19	10	59	−49	3	Relegation to the Division One Midlands

Source: The Football Association
Rules for classification: 1) Points; 2) Goal difference; 3) Number of goals scored
(C) Champions; (R) Relegated

==== Results ====
Home \ Away	FYL	BSM	BHT	BUR	DER	HUD	LIV	LOU	NOT	STO	WBA	WOL
AFC Fylde	—	2–1	0–0	2–4	0–3	2–0	1–4	2–2	1–2	2–2	1–2	1–4
Boldmere St. Michaels	3–0	—	1–2	2–3	2–2	1–7	1–2	3–0	1–10	1–2	1–2	0–2
Brighouse Town	5–0	2–0	—	1–1	0–1	1–1	2–1	0–0	1–1	1–0	2–0	0–3
Burnley	7–0	5–1	5–1	—	4–1	3–3	2–1	1–0	1–1	1–0	2–2	1–2
Derby County	0–2	6–1	1–1	2–3	—	2–1	1–1	5–0	0–2	5–1	5–0	1–3
Huddersfield Town	0–1	1–2	0–1	1–2	3–3	—	2–0	3–1	0–3	4–3	3–1	0–5
Liverpool Feds	2–2	5–2	5–3	0–7	2–4	0–1	—	2–0	2–4	1–2	2–1	1–1
Loughborough Lightning	0–1	0–2	0–3	1–2	1–2	0–2	0–3	—	2–2	0–3	1–2	0–6
Nottingham Forest	2–0	4–0	3–1	3–0	3–1	3–0	2–0	4–1	—	3–0	5–0	2–4
Stoke City	1–2	1–2	1–0	2–7	1–2	3–3	2–0	3–0	0–5	—	2–3	0–5
West Bromwich Albion	0–0	2–0	1–1	1–2	1–3	1–1	3–1	4–1	0–6	0–1	—	1–3
Wolverhampton Wanderers	0–2	1–0	2–0	1–3	0–0	5–0	2–1	4–0	3–1	2–2	3–1	—

Source: The Football Association
Legend: Blue = home team win; Yellow = draw; Red = away team win.

=== Southern Premier Division ===
FA Women's National League Southern Premier Division
- Season: 2022–23
- Champions: Watford
- Promoted: Watford
- Relegated: Bridgwater United; Crawley Wasps
- Matches: 132
- Goals: 415 (3.14 per match)
- Top goalscorer: Mollie Coupar (Milton Keynes Dons); Carly Johns (Oxford United) (15 goals)
- Biggest home win: Ipswich Town 8–0 Cheltenham Town (30 April 2023)
- Biggest away win: Crawley Wasps 1–6 Milton Keynes Dons (21 August 2022); Plymouth Argyle 0–5 Ipswich Town (20 November 2022); Crawley Wasps 0–5 Billericay Town (8 January 2023); Milton Keynes Dons 0–5 Watford (26 March 2023)
- Highest scoring: Milton Keynes Dons 6–3 Billericay Town (5 February 2023)

Changes from last season:

- Southampton F.C. were promoted to Championship as National League champions.
- Watford were relegated from Championship.
- Billericay Town were promoted from Division One South East as champions.
- Cheltenham Town were promoted from Division One South West as champions.
- Cardiff City Ladies were relegated to Division One South West.
- Chichester & Selsey were relegated to Division One South West.
- Hounslow were relegated to Division One South East.
- Keynsham Town were relegated to Division One South West.

Club	Home ground	Position 2021–22
Billericay Town	New Lodge, Billericay	WNL D1 South East, 1st
Bridgwater United	Fairfax Park, Bridgwater	4th
Cheltenham Town	Corinum Stadium, Cirencester	WNL D1 South West, 1st
Crawley Wasps	Camping World Community Stadium, Horsham	5th
Gillingham	Rede Court Road, Rochester	6th
Ipswich Town	The Goldstar Ground, Felixstowe	3rd
London Bees	The Hive, Edgware	8th
Milton Keynes Dons	Stadium MK, Milton Keynes	9th
Oxford United	Marsh Lane, Marston	2nd
Plymouth Argyle	Manadon Sports Hub, Plymouth	10th
Portsmouth	Westleigh Park, Havant	7th
Watford	Grosvenor Vale, Ruislip	Championship, 12th

Location of Southern Premier Division clubs for the 2022–23 season

==== League table ====
Pos	Team	Pld	W	D	L	GF	GA	GD	Pts	Promotion or relegation
1	Watford (C, O, P)	22	17	2	3	65	17	+48	53	Qualification for the Championship play-off
2	Ipswich Town	22	17	2	3	48	11	+37	53	
3	Oxford United	22	16	3	3	53	15	+38	51	
4	Portsmouth	22	15	2	5	44	20	+24	47	
5	Milton Keynes Dons	22	9	3	10	38	42	−4	30	
6	Billericay Town	22	8	4	10	37	41	−4	28	
7	Gillingham	22	8	4	10	23	29	−6	28	
8	Cheltenham Town	22	7	4	11	29	50	−21	25	
9	London Bees	22	7	2	13	22	41	−19	23	
10	Plymouth Argyle	22	6	1	15	23	45	−22	19	
11	Bridgwater United (R)	22	3	5	14	20	43	−23	14	Relegation to the Division One South West
12	Crawley Wasps (R)	22	1	4	17	13	61	−48	7	Relegation to the Division One South East

Source: The Football Association
Rules for classification: 1) Points; 2) Goal difference; 3) Number of goals scored
(C) Champions; (O) Play-off winners; (P) Promoted; (R) Relegated

==== Results ====
Home \ Away	BIL	BWU	CHL	CRA	GIL	IPS	LON	MKD	OXF	PLY	POR	WAT
Billericay Town	—	4–1	0–4	4–1	3–1	0–1	1–2	2–1	1–2	1–1	3–4	0–3
Bridgwater United	1–2	—	3–3	1–1	0–1	0–2	0–1	1–1	0–3	3–0	1–2	0–2
Cheltenham Town	2–1	1–1	—	3–1	0–0	0–2	0–1	2–2	2–1	3–1	0–3	1–3
Crawley Wasps	0–5	1–1	0–1	—	1–1	1–4	0–1	1–6	1–3	2–1	0–3	0–4
Gillingham	1–1	0–2	2–1	1–0	—	0–1	2–1	0–1	0–1	2–0	0–1	0–2
Ipswich Town	1–0	1–0	8–0	3–0	1–2	—	3–0	5–1	1–0	3–0	0–3	1–0
London Bees	1–1	4–0	2–4	1–1	1–2	1–2	—	0–2	1–5	1–2	1–4	0–4
Milton Keynes Dons	6–3	4–1	2–1	3–1	0–2	0–2	2–0	—	0–1	3–1	1–1	0–5
Oxford United	1–1	2–0	5–0	6–1	5–1	1–1	3–0	4–1	—	2–0	2–0	1–1
Plymouth Argyle	0–1	1–0	4–1	2–0	2–1	0–5	1–2	3–0	0–2	—	1–2	2–5
Portsmouth	5–0	2–3	2–0	1–0	2–2	1–0	0–1	4–1	1–2	1–0	—	2–0
Watford	2–3	5–1	6–0	6–0	3–2	1–1	2–0	2–1	2–1	5–1	2–0	—

Source: The Football Association
Legend: Blue = home team win; Yellow = draw; Red = away team win.

=== Championship play-off ===
The overall FA Women's National League champion was decided by a play-off match held at the end of the season between the Northern Division and Southern Division winners. The play-off match also earned promotion to the Women's Championship subject to meeting licensing requirements.

20 May 2023
13:00 BST (UTC+01:00)

Nottingham Forest	0–1	Watford
	Report	Wilson 17'

Stadium MK, Milton Keynes
Attendance: 3,007

== Division One ==
=== Division One North ===
FA Women's National League Division One North
- Season: 2022–23
- Champions: Newcastle United
- Promoted: Newcastle United
- Relegated: Bradford City; Merseyrail
- Matches: 132
- Goals: 424 (3.21 per match)
- Top goalscorer: Hope Knight (Hull City) (20 goals)
- Biggest home win: Newcastle United 9–0 Merseyrail (18 December 2022)
- Biggest away win: Chorley 0–8 Durham Cestria (7 May 2023)
- Highest scoring: Newcastle United 9–0 Merseyrail (18 December 2022)

Changes from last season:

- Liverpool Feds were promoted to Northern Premier Division as Division One North champions.
- Hull City were relegated from Northern Premier Division.
- Middlesbrough were relegated from Northern Premier Division.
- Merseyrail were promoted as North West Women's Regional Football League champions.
- York City were promoted as North East Regional Women's Football League champions.
- Alnwick Town were relegated to North East Regional Women's Football League.
- Chester-le-Street were relegated to North East Regional Women's Football League.
- F.C. United of Manchester were relegated to North West Women's Regional Football League.

Club	Home ground	Position 2021–22
Barnsley	Wombwell Recreation Ground, Wombwell	9th
Bradford City	Plumpton Park, Wrose	7th
Chorley	Blainscough Park, Coppull	5th
Durham Cestria	The Graham Sports Centre, Durham	3rd
Hull City	Haworth Park, Kingston upon Hull	WNL North, 12th
Leeds United	Ings Lane, Tadcaster	4th
Merseyrail	Admiral Park, Toxteth	NWWRFL, 1st
Middlesbrough	Bedford Terrace, Billingham	WNL North, 11th
Newcastle United	Druid Park, Woolsington	2nd
Norton & Stockton Ancients	Station Road, Norton, County Durham	8th
Stockport County	Stockport Sports Village, Stockport	6th
York City	Haxby Road Sports Park, York	NERWFL, 1st

Location of Division One North clubs for the 2022–23 season

==== League table ====
Pos	Team	Pld	W	D	L	GF	GA	GD	Pts	Promotion or relegation
1	Newcastle United (C, P)	22	18	2	2	65	18	+47	56	Promotion to the Northern Premier Division
2	Durham Cestria	22	18	2	2	55	12	+43	56	
3	Stockport County	22	11	4	7	39	23	+16	37	
4	Barnsley	22	11	4	7	37	27	+10	37	
5	Hull City	22	10	5	7	46	30	+16	35	
6	Leeds United	22	11	2	9	41	34	+7	35	
7	Norton & Stockton Ancients	22	8	6	8	26	33	−7	30	
8	Chorley	22	6	4	12	27	48	−21	22	
9	York City	22	6	3	13	32	46	−14	21	
10	Middlesbrough	22	6	3	13	23	46	−23	21	
11	Bradford City (R)	22	6	0	16	22	48	−26	18	Relegation from the National League
12	Merseyrail (R)	22	1	5	16	11	59	−48	8	Relegation from the National League

Source: The Football Association
Rules for classification: 1) Points; 2) Goal difference; 3) Number of goals scored
(C) Champions; (P) Promoted; (R) Relegated

=== Division One Midlands ===
FA Women's National League Division One Midlands
- Season: 2022–23
- Champions: Stourbridge
- Promoted: Stourbridge
- Relegated: Wem Town; Long Eaton United
- Matches: 132
- Goals: 574 (4.35 per match)
- Top goalscorer: Niamh Deasy (Stourbridge) (17 goals)
- Biggest home win: Sheffield 19–0 Long Eaton United (6 April 2023)
- Biggest away win: Long Eaton United 1–16 Stourbridge (22 March 2023)
- Highest scoring: Sheffield FC 19–0 Long Eaton United (6 April 2023); Lincoln City 18–1 Long Eaton United (30 April 2023)

Changes from last season:

- Boldmere St. Michaels were promoted to Northern Premier Division as Division One Midlands champions.
- Sheffield were relegated from Northern Premier Division.
- Northampton Town were promoted from East Midlands Regional Women's Football League as champions.
- Stourbridge were promoted from West Midlands Regional Women's Football League as champions.
- Bedworth United were relegated to West Midlands Regional Women's Football League.
- Burton Albion were relegated to West Midlands Regional Women's Football League.
- Despite finishing the 2021–22 season in a relegation place in 10th, Wem Town were handed a reprieve from relegation.

Club	Home ground	Position 2021–22
Doncaster Rovers Belles	Iqbal Stadium, Moorends	2nd
Leafield Athletic	Dickens Heath Sports Club, Solihull	9th
Leek Town	Harrison Park, Leek	5th
Lincoln City	Moorlands Sports Ground, Lincoln	3rd
Long Eaton United	Grange Park, Long Eaton	4th
Northampton Town	Larkhall Lane, Harpole	EMRWFL, 1st
Peterborough United	Mick George Training Academy, Orton	8th
Sheffield	Home of Football Ground, Dronfield	WNL North, 13th
Solihull Moors	Damson Park, Solihull	7th
Sporting Khalsa	Aspray Arena, Willenhall	6th
Stourbridge	War Memorial Ground, Stourbridge	WMRWFL, 1st
Wem Town	Butler Sports Centre, Wem	10th

Location of Division One Midlands clubs for the 2022–23 season

==== League table ====
Pos	Team	Pld	W	D	L	GF	GA	GD	Pts	Promotion or relegation
1	Stourbridge (C, P)	22	17	3	2	86	16	+70	54	Promotion to the Northern Premier Division
2	Doncaster Rovers Belles	22	13	3	6	45	22	+23	42	
3	Sporting Khalsa	22	12	3	7	62	33	+29	39	
4	Peterborough United	22	12	3	7	48	30	+18	39	
5	Northampton Town	22	11	3	8	45	26	+19	36	
6	Lincoln City	22	9	3	10	73	54	+19	30	
7	Solihull Moors	22	8	6	8	43	29	+14	30	
8	Sheffield	21	8	4	9	46	28	+18	28	
9	Leafield Athletic	22	8	4	10	45	47	−2	28	
10	Leek Town	22	7	6	9	38	49	−11	27	
11	Wem Town (R)	21	5	2	14	31	58	−27	17	Relegation from the National League
12	Long Eaton United (R)	22	1	0	21	12	182	−170	3	Relegation from the National League

Updated to match(es) played on 7 May 2023. Source: The Football Association
Rules for classification: 1) Points; 2) Goal difference; 3) Number of goals scored
(C) Champions; (P) Promoted; (R) Relegated

=== Division One South East ===
FA Women's National League Division One South East
- Season: 2022–23
- Champions: Hashtag United
- Promoted: Hashtag United
- Matches: 90
- Goals: 369 (4.1 per match)
- Top goalscorer: Ashlee Hincks (AFC Wimbledon) (15 goals)
- Biggest home win: Hashtag United 13–2 Chesham United (12 October 2022)
- Biggest away win: Norwich City 1–7 Hashtag United (12 February 2023); Chesham United 0–6 Hashtag United (16 March 2023)
- Highest scoring: Hashtag United 13–2 Chesham United (12 October 2022)

Changes from last season:

- Billericay Town were promoted to Southern Premier Division as Division One South East champions.
- Hounslow were relegated from Southern Premier Division.
- Chesham United realigned from Division One South West.
- Ashford Town were promoted from London and South East Women's Regional Football League as champions.
- Wymondham Town were promoted from Eastern Region Women's Football League as champions.
- Enfield Town were relegated to London and South East Women's Regional Football League.
- Harlow Town were relegated to Eastern Region Women's Football League.
- Kent Football United were relegated to London and South East Women's Regional Football League and rebranded to Ebbsfleet United.
- Stevenage were relegated to Eastern Region Women's Football League.
- Wymondham Town withdrew from the league on 14 October 2022 and their results were expunged.
- Hounslow withdrew from the league on 28 February 2023 and their results were expunged. As a result of two teams withdrawing, there was no longer any relegation from Division One South East.

Club	Home ground	Position 2021–22
Actonians	Rectory Park, Northolt	5th
AFC Wimbledon	Plough Lane, Wimbledon	3rd
Ashford Town	Robert Parker Stadium, Stanwell	LSEWRFL, 1st
Cambridge City	The Demcom Stadium, Ely	7th
Cambridge United	Rowley Park, St Neots	9th
Chesham United	The Meadow, Chesham	WNL D1 South West, 5th
Hashtag United	Parkside, Aveley	2nd
Hounslow	Rectory Meadow, Hanworth	WNL South, 14th
London Seaward	Hornchurch Stadium, Upminster	6th
Norwich City	The Nest, Horsford	8th
Queens Park Rangers	Powerday Stadium, Perivale	4th
Wymondham Town	Kings Head Meadow, Wymondham	ERWFL, 1st

Location of Division One South East clubs for the 2022–23 season

==== League table ====
Pos	Team	Pld	W	D	L	GF	GA	GD	Pts	Promotion or relegation
1	Hashtag United (C, P)	18	16	1	1	77	14	+63	49	Promotion to the Southern Premier Division
2	AFC Wimbledon	18	14	3	1	45	13	+32	45	
3	Actonians	18	10	2	6	52	26	+26	32	
4	Norwich City	18	9	3	6	32	34	−2	30	
5	London Seaward	18	8	5	5	34	31	+3	29	
6	Ashford Town	18	7	2	9	34	41	−7	23	
7	Queens Park Rangers	18	6	4	8	31	36	−5	22	
8	Cambridge United	18	3	5	10	30	45	−15	14	
9	Cambridge City	18	2	1	15	17	50	−33	7	
10	Chesham United	18	2	0	16	17	79	−62	6	
11	Hounslow (W)	0	0	0	0	0	0	0	0	Withdrew from league
12	Wymondham Town (W)	0	0	0	0	0	0	0	0	Withdrew from league

Source: The Football Association
Rules for classification: 1) Points; 2) Goal difference; 3) Number of goals scored
(C) Champions; (P) Promoted; (W) Withdrew from the league

=== Division One South West ===
FA Women's National League Division One South West
- Season: 2022–23
- Champions: Cardiff City Ladies
- Promoted: Cardiff City Ladies
- Relegated: Larkhall Athletic; AFC St Austell
- Matches: 132
- Goals: 539 (4.08 per match)
- Top goalscorer: Sarah Stacey (Exeter City) (29 goals)
- Biggest home win: Cardiff City Ladies 10–0 AFC St Austell (12 February 2023); Keynsham Town 11–1 AFC St Austell (26 March 2023)
- Biggest away win: AFC St Austell 0–12 Exeter City (22 February 2023)
- Highest scoring: AFC St Austell 0–12 Exeter City (22 February 2023); Keynsham Town 11–1 AFC St Austell (26 March 2023)

Changes from last season:

- Cheltenham Town were promoted to Southern Premier Division as Division One South West champions.
- Cardiff City Ladies were relegated from Southern Premier Division.
- Keynsham Town were relegated from Southern Premier Division.
- Chichester & Selsey were relegated from Southern Premier Division and rebranded to Selsey.
- Chesham United realigned to Division One South East.
- AFC St Austell were promoted from South West Regional Women's Football League as champions.
- Moneyfields were promoted from Southern Region Women's Football League as champions.
- Poole Town were relegated to South West Regional Women's Football League.

Club	Home ground	Position 2021–22
AFC Bournemouth	Potterne Park, Verwood	2nd
AFC St Austell	Poltair Park, St Austell	SWRWFL, 1st
Cardiff City Ladies	CCB Centre for Sporting Excellence, Ystrad Mynach	WNL South, 11th
Exeter City	Cullompton Cricket Club, Cullompton	3rd
Keynsham Town	Crown Field, Keynsham	WNL South, 13th
Larkhall Athletic	Larkhall Sports Club, Larkhall	9th
Maidenhead United	York Road, Maidenhead	6th
Moneyfields	Moneyfields Sports Ground, Portsmouth	SRWFL, 1st
Portishead Town	Bristol Road, Portishead	8th
Selsey	The High Street Ground, Selsey	WNL South, 12th
Southampton Women's	Arlebury Park, New Alresford	4th
Swindon Town	Cinder Lane, Fairford	7th

Location of Division One South West clubs for the 2022–23 season

==== League table ====
Pos	Team	Pld	W	D	L	GF	GA	GD	Pts	Promotion or relegation
1	Cardiff City Ladies (C, P)	22	19	1	2	86	13	+73	58	Promotion to the Southern Premier Division
2	Exeter City	22	19	1	2	83	18	+65	58	
3	Moneyfields	21	13	5	3	53	27	+26	44	
4	AFC Bournemouth	22	13	4	5	59	21	+38	43	
5	Southampton Women	22	13	3	6	50	31	+19	42	
6	Swindon Town	22	8	4	10	35	48	−13	28	
7	Portishead Town	22	8	1	13	32	63	−31	25	
8	Selsey	22	7	1	14	34	37	−3	22	
9	Keynsham Town	22	7	1	14	36	64	−28	22	
10	Maidenhead United	21	6	3	12	25	42	−17	21	
11	Larkhall Athletic (R)	21	4	0	17	19	62	−43	12	Relegation from the National League
12	AFC St Austell (R)	21	1	0	20	27	113	−86	3	Relegation from the National League

Updated to match(es) played on 7 May 2023. Source: The Football Association
Rules for classification: 1) Points; 2) Goal difference; 3) Number of goals scored
(C) Champions; (P) Promoted; (R) Relegated

== See also ==
- 2022–23 FA Women's National League Cup
- 2022–23 FA Women's National League Plate
- 2022–23 Women's Super League (tier 1)
- 2022–23 Women's Championship (tier 2)
