= 2021–22 FA Women's National League Cup =

Tournament details
- Country: England & Wales
- Teams: 76

Final positions
- Champions: Southampton
- Runners-up: Huddersfield Town
- All statistics correct as of 02 October 2023.

The 2021–22 FA Women's National League Cup is the 30th running of the FA Women's National League Cup, which began in 1991. It is the major League Cup competition run by the FA Women's Premier League, and is run alongside their secondary League Cup competition, the Premier League Plate.

== Results ==
All results listed are published by The Football Association. Games are listed by round in chronological order, and then in alphabetical order of the home team where matches were played simultaneously.

The division each team play in is indicated in brackets after their name: (S)=Southern Division; (N)=Northern Division; (SW1)=South West Division One; (SE1)=South East Division One; (M1)=Midlands Division One; (N1)=Northern Division One.

=== Determining round ===
| 12 September 2021 | AFC Wimbledon | 1–2 | Oxford United (S) |
| 14:00 | Hincks 90+6' | Report | Casley 81'; Johns 90+2' |

| 12 September 2021 | Alnwick Town | 2–6 | Chorley |
| 14:00 | Williams 63'; Barrett 73' | Report | Jones 10'; Cleary 42', 59'; Mills 74', 83'; Mathews 86' |

| 12 September 2021 | Barnsley | 2–0 | Sporting Khalsa |
| 14:00 | Ashton 25'; Shaw 40' | Report |

| 12 September 2021 | Bedworth United | 2–5 | Burton Albion |
| 14:00 | Farnsworth; Taylor | Report | Gillott; Naqwi; Azhar; Hornsby |

| 12 September 2021 | Bridgwater United | 2–1 | Maidenhead United |
| 14:00 | Hinchcliffe 35'; Goddard 90' | Report | Barrett |

| 12 September 2021 | Brighouse Town (N) | 4–1 | Holwell Sports |
| 14:00 | Cass 36', 72'; Fields 65'; White 76' | Report | Robinson |

| 12 September 2021 | Cambridge City | 17–0 | Buckland Athletic |
| 14:00 | Delglyn; Fulllwood; Gillies; Shaw; Tomlinson | Report |

| 12 September 2021 | Cambridge United | 4–0 | Portishead |
| 14:00 | Banks; Davies; Fox | Report |

| 12 September 2021 | Cardiff City | 2–0 | Actonians |
| 14:00 | Pinder 11'; Sargent 66' | Report |

| 12 September 2021 | Cheltenham Town | 2–3 | Southampton (S) |
| 14:00 | Bevan 18'; Butler 90+3' | Report | Kendall 43'; Freeland 50'; Pharoah 75' |

| 12 September 2021 | Chesham United | 1–2 | Kent Football United |
| 14:00 | Bowers 27' | Report | Payani 5'; Madden 74' | Attendance: 30 |

| 12 September 2021 | Chester le Street Town | 3–0 | Leafield Athletic |
| 14:00 | Havery 7', 85'; Gardener 83' | Report |

| 12 September 2021 | Crawley Wasps (S) | 11–0 | London Seaward |
| 14:00 | Lancaster 10', 67', 82'; Owen 21', 27'; Plewa 32', 48'; Cole 42'; Jackson (44); Swaby 66'; Stephens 80' | Report | | Attendance: 52 |

| 12 September 2021 | Derby County | 7–0 | Lincoln City |
| 14:00 | Fisher 14', 15'; Gilliatt 35', 69', 75'; Sims 64'; Hamilton 84' | Report | | Attendance: 110 |

| 12 September 2021 | Durham Cestria | 3–1 (a.e.t.) | Stockport County |
| 14:00 | Mett 28'; Atkinson 92', 120' | Report | Dixon 80' |

| 12 September 2021 | Enfield Town | 4–1 | Queens Park Rangers |
| 14:00 | Darroux 33', 42', 89'; O'Leary Collen 56' | Report | Parsons 4' |

| 12 September 2021 | Exeter City | 0–2 | Plymouth Argyle |
| 14:00 | | Report | Alphous 15'; Rose 68' | Attendance: 207 |

| 12 September 2021 | FC United Of Manchester | 0–9 | AFC Fylde (N) |
| 14:00 | | Report | Fuller; McCoy; Redgrave; Rowe; Bartley |

| 12 September 2021 | Gillingham | 6–0 | Norwich City |
| 14:00 | Fordjour 11', 56'; Russ 58'; Charles 61', 64'; Jestin 90' | Report |

| 12 September 2021 | Harlow Town | 0–5 | Billericay Town |
| 14:00 | | Report | Fuller; Jeffkins; Lockett; Jones |

| 12 September 2021 | Hashtag United (SE1) | 7–0 | Stevenage |
| 14:00 | Abrehart; Adamson; Gille; Clarke; Wealthall | Report | | Attendance: 107 |

| 12 September 2021 | Hounslow | 0–1 | Bournemouth |
| 14:00 | | Report | Corbiin 8' |

| 12 September 2021 | Huddersfield Town (N) | 7–2 | Boldmere St Michaels |
| 14:00 | Montgomery 6'; Marsden 18', 71'; Sanderson 24', 49'; Mallin 68'; Sowerby 87' | Report | Fox 20'; Highway 65' |

| 12 September 2021 | Hull City | H–W | Burnley |
| 14:00 | Bott 4'; Smith 22' | Report | Cooper; Molinari; Priestley; Ravening; Willis; Worthington |

| 12 September 2021 | Ipswich Town | 1–0 | London Bees |
| 14:00 | Barratt | Report |

| 12 September 2021 | Liverpool Feds (N1) | 1–0 | Nottingham Forest |
| 14:00 | Feltcher 32' | Report |

| 12 September 2021 | Loughborough Lightning | 2–1 | Doncaster Rovers Belles |
| 14:00 | Russell 16', 79' | Report | Khan | Attendance: 92 |

| 12 September 2021 | Milton Keynes Dons | 7–1 | Keynsham Town |
| 14:00 | Albert; Bell; Bright; Neal; Rush | Report | Butcher 77' |

| 12 September 2021 | Newcastle United | 6–0 | Leek Town |
| 14:00 | Barker; Gibson | Report |

| 12 September 2021 | Norton & Stockton Ancients | 10–2 | Wem Town |
| 14:00 | Ownes 5', 14', 27', 33', 75'; Patrick 18', 34', 44'; Tierney 25'; Moore 66' | Report | Doster; Ridge |

| 12 September 2021 | Poole Town | 0–1 | Swindon Town |
| 14:00 | | Report | Goal | Attendance: 21 |

| 12 September 2021 | Portsmouth | 0–2 | Chichester & Selsey |
| 14:00 | | Report | Fox 26' |

| 12 September 2021 | Sheffield | 1–0 | Bradford City |
| 14:00 | Waite 60' | Report |

| 12 September 2021 | Southampton Women | 3–1 | Larkhall Athletic |
| 14:00 | Lawrence 3'; Wylie 36'; May 42' | Report | Hull 51' |

| 12 September 2021 | Stoke City | 7–0 | Solihull Moors |
| 14:00 | Kivel 1'; Knight 2', 8', 40'; Barber 36', 56' | Report |

| 12 September 2021 | West Bromwich Albion | 2–3 (a.e.t.) | Middlesbrough |
| 14:00 | Straker; Robinson | Report | Maxwell; Olley; Marshall |

| 12 September 2021 | Wolverhampton Wanderers | 3–1 | Leeds United |
| 14:00 | Joyce 14'; Price 45+1', 90+4' | Report | Bartup 57' | Attendance: 300 |

=== Preliminary round ===
| 10 October 2021 | Oxford United (S) | 5–0 | Swindon Town |
| 12:00 | Baker 4', 29', 31'; Lumsden 60', 79' | Report |

| 10 October 2021 | Bournemouth | 5–0 | Kent Football United |
| 14:00 | James 23', 43'; Bath 51'; Barron-Clark 62'; Bussell 79' | Report | | Attendance: 137 |

| 10 October 2021 | Brighouse Town (N) | 5–2 | Stoke City |
| 14:00 | Embley; Woodruff | Report | Barber; Roberts |

| 10 October 2021 | Derby County | 5–0 | Barnsley |
| 14:00 | Joyce 28', 69'; Tinsley 51', 62'; Gilliatt 76' | Report | | Attendance: 221 |

| 10 October 2021 | Long Eaton United | 3–4 | Norton & Stockton Ancients |
| 14:00 | Dexter; Spokes; Thornton | Report | Owens 46', 90+4'; Patrick 70'; Millward 85' | Attendance: 35 |

| 10 October 2021 | Sheffield | 2–5 | Fylde (N) |
| 14:00 | Evison; Mason | Report | Bartley 12'; Mortimer 38'; Holbrook 48'; Forster 53'; Rowe 51' |

=== First round ===
| 7 November 2021 | Huddersfield Town (N) | 3–2 | Middlesbrough |
| 13:00 | Mallin 23', 31'; Montgomery 70' | Report | Boddy; Jones | Attendance: 76 |

| 7 November 2021 | Billericay Town | 2–2 (a.e.t.) (3–1 p) | Enfield Town |
| 14:00 | Rushen; Pittuck | Report | Thomas 11', 22' |

| 7 November 2021 | Cambridge United | 1–2 | Loughborough Lightning |
| 14:00 | Baker | Report | Taft 28'; Richardson 65' |

| 7 November 2021 | Chichester & Selsey | 3–1 | Plymouth Argyle |
| 14:00 | Blakely 55'; Fox 80'; Saunders 90+2' | Report | Knapman 61' | Attendance: 60 |

| 7 November 2021 | Derby County | 7–0 | Burton Albion |
| 14:00 | Hamilton 18', 54'; Sims 25', 49'; Gilliatt 45+3', 47'; Formaston 76' | Report | | Attendance: 205 |

| 7 November 2021 | Durham Cestria | 1–2 | Fylde (N) |
| 14:00 | Atkinson 60' | Report | Donoghue 1'; Hughes 21' |

| 7 November 2021 | Gillingham | 0–1 | Crawley Wasps (S) |
| 14:00 | | Report | Gibson |

| 7 November 2021 | Hashtag United (SE1) | 0–0 (a.e.t.) (3–0 p) | Bournemouth |
| 14:00 | | Report |

| 7 November 2021 | Ipswich Town | 0–1 | Southampton (S) |
| 14:00 | | Report | Kendall | Attendance: 619 |

| 7 November 2021 | Liverpool Feds (N1) | 3–0 | Chorley |
| 14:00 | Pope 55'; Seagraves 76'; Devereaux 81' | Report |

| 7 November 2021 | Milton Keynes Dons | 2–1 | Cambridge City |
| 14:00 | Gould; Scott | Report | Stanley |

| 7 November 2021 | Newcastle United | 1–3 | Brighouse Town (N) |
| 14:00 | Elson | Report | Embley; White |

| 7 November 2021 | Norton & Stockton Ancients | 5–0 | Chester le Street Town |
| 14:00 | Patrick 7', 44'; Tierney 29', 79'; Owens 61' | Report |

| 7 November 2021 | Oxford United (S) | 2–0 | Bridgwater United |
| 14:00 | Lumsden 60'; McLachlan 80' | Report |

| 7 November 2021 | Southampton Women | 5–1 | Cardiff City |
| 14:00 | Okoro 8'; Wylie 51'; Jeal 59'; May 85'; Heslam 90+2' | Report | Thompson 15' |

| 7 November 2021 | Wolverhampton Wanderers | 7–0 | Hull City |
| 14:00 | Dermody 37'; Merrick 56'; Hughes 58', 64'; Morphet 72'; Dicken 83'; Miller 85' | Report | | Attendance: 240 |

=== Second round ===
| 5 December 2021 | Southampton (S) | 2–1 | Milton Keynes Dons |
| 14:00 | Ware 55'; Rutherford 78' | Report | Taho |

| 5 December 2021 | Oxford United (S) | 2–0 | Billericay Town |
| 14:00 | Sims 7'; Panting 65' | Report |

| 5 December 2021 | Chichester & Selsey | 2–2 (a.e.t.) (4–5 p) | Hashtag United (SE1) |
| 14:00 | Saunders 55'; Yeates 95' | Report | Adams; Gille |

| 5 December 2021 | Norton & Stockton Ancients | 2–3 (a.e.t.) | AFC Fylde (N) |
| 14:00 | Owens 57', 61' | Report | McCoy 45+2', 89', 94' |

| 5 December 2021 | Loughborough Lightning | 1–3 | Huddersfield Town (N) |
| 14:00 | Morrison 70' | Report | Montgomery 29'; Elford 51'; Mallin 66' |

| 5 December 2021 | Liverpool Feds (N1) | 3–3 (3–2 p) | Wolverhampton Wanderers |
| 14:00 | Kinvig 9'; Slade 17'; Rogers 113' | Report | Darby 35'; Merrick 49'; Cooper 114' |

| 5 December 2021 | Derby County | 1–4 | Brighouse Town (N) |
| 14:00 | Domingo 61' | Report | Embley; Legge; Whitham; Porteous-Williams |

| 5 December 2021 | Southampton Women | 0–4 | Crawley Wasps (S) |
| 14:00 | | Report | Cole; Plewa; Stephens; Swaby |

=== Quarter-finals ===
| 6 February 2022 | Southampton (S) | 1–0 | Hashtag United (SE1) | Totton |
| 14:00 | Rood 75' | Report | | Stadium: Snows Stadium; Attendance: 304 |

| 6 February 2022 | Crawley Wasps (S) | 1–0 | Oxford United (S) | Horley |
| 14:00 | Stephens 75' | Report | | Stadium: Horley Leisure Centre |

| 6 February 2022 | AFC Fylde (N) | 0–2 | Liverpool Feds (N) | Warton |
| 14:00 | | Report | Thompson 64'; Jones 91' | Stadium: Kellamergh Park |

| 23 February 2022 | Brighouse Town (N) | 1–4 | Huddersfield Town (N) | Brighouse |
| 19:45 | Greene | Report | Sanderson 64'; Elford 23', 30', 90' | Stadium: St Giles Road |

=== Semi-finals ===
| 6 March 2022 | Southampton (S) | 2–0 | Crawley Wasps (S) | Southampton |
| 14:00 | Rood 54'; Ware 75' | Report | | Stadium: Snows Stadium; Attendance: 331 |

| 6 March 2022 | Liverpool Feds (N1) | 0–1 | Huddersfield Town (N) | Liverpool |
| 14:00 | | Report | Stanley 46' | Stadium: Jericho Lane Sports Hub |

=== Final ===
24 April 2022
15:30

| Southampton (S) | 3–0 | Huddersfield Town (N) |
|---|---|---|
| Ware 45'; Kendall 71', 83' | Report |

Damson Park, Solihull
