= 2021–22 FA Women's National League =

FA Women's National League
- Season: 2021–22
- Champions: Southampton
- Promoted: Southampton

The 2021–22 FA Women's National League was the 31st season of the competition, and the fourth since a restructure and rebranding of the top four tiers of English football by The Football Association. Starting in 1991, it was previously known as the FA Women's Premier League. It sits at the third and fourth levels of the women's football pyramid, below the FA Women's Championship and above the eight regional football leagues.

The league featured six regional divisions: the Northern and Southern Premier divisions at level three of the pyramid, and Division One North, Division One Midlands, Division One South East, and Division One South West at the fourth level. The league consisted of 76 teams, divided into six divisions of 13 teams apart from the Southern Premier Division which contains 14 teams, Division One North which contains 12 teams, and Division One South West which contains 11 teams. At the end of the season the winners of the Northern and Southern Premier divisions qualified for a play-off match to decide the overall National League champion. Southampton beat Wolverhampton Wanderers in the final and were promoted to the FA Women's Championship.

== Premier Division ==
=== Northern Premier Division ===
FA Women's National League Northern Premier Division
- Season: 2021–22
- Champions: Wolverhampton Wanderers
- Relegated: Middlesbrough; Hull City; Sheffield
- Matches: 156
- Goals: 529 (3.39 per match)
- Top goalscorer: Ellie Gilliatt (Derby County); Faye McCoy (AFC Fylde); Evie Priestley (Burnley) (16 goals)
- Biggest home win: Burnley 7–0 Hull City (3 April 2022)
- Biggest away win: West Bromwich Albion 0–8 Burnley (24 April 2022)
- Highest scoring: Loughborough Lightning 5–4 Brighouse Town (30 January 2022)

Changes from last season:

- Following the second consecutive curtailment of the season amid the COVID-19 pandemic in March 2021, it was decided that upward club movement within the women's football pyramid would be done via application. All clubs from tiers 3 to 6 were eligible to apply to move into the league immediately one tier above where they currently played with applications marked against a criterion weighted 75% on-field and 25% off-field.
- Sunderland were promoted to FA Women's Championship via application.
- Brighouse Town were promoted from Division One North via application.
- Wolverhampton Wanderers were promoted from Division One Midlands via application.
- Loughborough Foxes merged with Loughborough University's performance team to become Loughborough Lightning.

Club	Home ground	Position 2020–21
AFC Fylde	Kelamergh Park, Warton	N/A
Brighouse Town	Yorkshire Payments Stadium, Brighouse	D1 North, N/A
Burnley	Crown Ground, Accrington	N/A
Derby County	Don Amott Arena, Derby	N/A
Huddersfield Town	The Stafflex Arena, Kirkburton	N/A
Hull City	Haworth Park, Kingston upon Hull	N/A
Loughborough Lightning	Loughborough University Stadium, Loughborough	N/A (as Loughborough Foxes)
Middlesbrough	Bedford Terrace, Billingham	N/A
Nottingham Forest	Coronation Park, Eastwood	N/A
Sheffield	Home of Football Ground, Dronfield	N/A
Stoke City	Norton Cricket Club, Stoke-on-Trent	N/A
West Bromwich Albion	Central Ground, Sutton Coldfield	N/A
Wolverhampton Wanderers	Castlecroft Stadium, Wolverhampton	D1 Midlands, N/A

Location of Northern Premier Division clubs for the 2021–22 season

==== League table ====
Pos	Team	Pld	W	D	L	GF	GA	GD	Pts	Promotion or relegation
1	Wolverhampton Wanderers (C)	24	18	5	1	61	16	+45	59	Qualification for the Championship play-off
2	Derby County	24	16	3	5	48	19	+29	51	
3	AFC Fylde	24	14	5	5	47	28	+19	47	
4	Burnley	24	14	4	6	70	27	+43	46	
5	Nottingham Forest	24	13	5	6	40	17	+23	44	
6	Huddersfield Town	24	13	4	7	54	28	+26	43	
7	Brighouse Town	24	11	7	6	51	31	+20	40	
8	West Bromwich Albion	24	7	7	10	29	44	−15	28	
9	Stoke City	24	8	1	15	36	54	−18	25	
10	Loughborough Lightning	24	6	5	13	35	63	−28	23	
11	Middlesbrough (R)	24	5	3	16	27	67	−40	18	Relegation to the Division One North
12	Hull City (R)	24	2	3	19	18	72	−54	9	Relegation to the Division One North
13	Sheffield (R)	24	2	2	20	13	63	−50	8	Relegation to the Division One Midlands

Source: The Football Association
Rules for classification: 1) Points; 2) Goal difference; 3) Number of goals scored
(C) Champions; (R) Relegated

==== Results ====
Home \ Away	BHT	BUR	DER	FYL	HUD	HUL	LOU	MID	NOT	SHE	STO	WBA	WOL
Brighouse Town	—	3–1	2–3	0–1	1–0	5–0	2–1	4–1	0–1	1–0	2–3	1–1	1–1
Burnley	0–1	—	1–0	2–2	4–0	7–0	3–0	6–1	1–4	6–1	3–1	3–4	3–0
Derby County	1–3	2–1	—	0–0	3–0	3–1	1–1	4–0	1–0	4–0	5–0	0–0	0–1
AFC Fylde	5–2	2–0	0–2	—	1–5	3–0	2–0	6–1	2–1	4–1	2–1	4–0	1–1
Huddersfield Town	1–1	0–0	1–3	3–0	—	1–2	2–2	2–0	2–1	2–0	5–1	3–0	2–3
Hull City	1–5	0–3	1–2	0–1	0–5	—	1–3	0–0	0–6	4–0	1–4	0–0	0–5
Loughborough Lightning	5–4	2–6	0–3	4–1	1–5	2–2	—	1–2	1–1	3–0	1–5	2–1	0–3
Middlesbrough	0–5	1–3	0–2	0–3	1–3	2–1	1–3	—	0–7	2–1	1–2	4–1	0–4
Nottingham Forest	0–0	1–1	0–2	1–0	0–0	1–0	4–0	3–2	—	3–1	2–1	1–0	0–3
Sheffield	0–3	0–4	0–2	0–2	0–6	4–0	1–1	1–1	0–2	—	1–0	0–2	0–5
Stoke City	1–1	0–2	2–3	2–3	1–2	3–0	4–2	2–6	0–1	2–1	—	2–0	0–4
West Bromwich Albion	2–2	0–8	2–0	2–2	1–3	4–2	5–0	1–1	0–0	2–1	1–0	—	0–3
Wolverhampton Wanderers	2–2	2–2	3–2	0–0	2–1	3–2	4–0	2–0	1–0	2–0	5–0	2–0	—

Source: The Football Association
Legend: Blue = home team win; Yellow = draw; Red = away team win.

=== Southern Premier Division ===
FA Women's National League Southern Premier Division
- Season: 2021–22
- Champions: Southampton
- Promoted: Southampton
- Relegated: Cardiff City; Chichester & Selsey; Keynsham Town; Hounslow
- Matches: 182
- Goals: 658 (3.62 per match)
- Top goalscorer: Ella Pusey (Southampton) (24 goals)
- Biggest home win: Southampton 9–0 Gillingham (29 August 2021); Ipswich Town 11–2 Keynsham Town (19 September 2021); Southampton 9–0 Keynsham Town (3 October 2021); Bridgwater United 9–0 Keynsham Town (6 October 2021); Ipswich Town 9–0 Hounslow (16 January 2022); Oxford United 9–0 Keynsham Town (3 April 2022)
- Biggest away win: Hounslow 0–11 Portsmouth (26 September 2021)
- Highest scoring: Ipswich Town 11–2 Keynsham Town (19 September 2021)

Changes from last season:

- Following the second consecutive curtailment of the season amid the COVID-19 pandemic in March 2021, it was decided that upward club movement within the women's football pyramid would be done via application. All clubs from tiers 3 to 6 were eligible to apply to move into the league immediately one tier above where they currently played with applications marked against a criterion weighted 75% on-field and 25% off-field.
- Watford were promoted to FA Women's Championship via application.
- London Bees were relegated from FA Women's Championship on sporting merit.
- Ipswich Town were promoted from Division One South East via application.
- Southampton were promoted from Division One South West via application.
- Yeovil United became Bridgwater United W.F.C. after merging with men's club Bridgwater Town.

Club	Home ground	Position 2020–21
Bridgwater United	Fairfax Park, Bridgwater	N/A (as Yeovil United)
Cardiff City	CCB Centre for Sporting Excellence, Ystrad Mynach	N/A
Chichester & Selsey	The High Street Ground, Selsey	N/A
Crawley Wasps	Camping World Community Stadium, Horsham	N/A
Gillingham	Rede Court Road, Rochester	N/A
Hounslow	Rectory Meadow, Hanworth	N/A
Ipswich Town	The Goldstar Ground, Felixstowe	D1 South East, N/A
Keynsham Town	Crown Field, Keynsham	N/A
London Bees	The Hive, Edgware	Championship, 11th
Milton Keynes Dons	Stadium MK, Milton Keynes	N/A
Oxford United	Marsh Lane, Marston	N/A
Plymouth Argyle	Manadon Sports Hub, Plymouth	N/A
Portsmouth	Westleigh Park, Havant	N/A
Southampton	Snows Stadium, Totton	D1 South West, N/A

Location of Southern Premier Division clubs for the 2021–22 season

==== League table ====
Pos	Team	Pld	W	D	L	GF	GA	GD	Pts	Promotion or relegation
1	Southampton (C, O, P)	26	22	3	1	99	13	+86	69	Qualification for the Championship play-off
2	Oxford United	26	19	3	4	71	15	+56	60	
3	Ipswich Town	26	18	4	4	69	14	+55	58	
4	Bridgwater United	26	15	5	6	48	16	+32	50	
5	Crawley Wasps	26	15	0	11	57	40	+17	45	
6	Gillingham	26	13	6	7	37	33	+4	45	
7	Portsmouth	26	13	4	9	51	29	+22	43	
8	London Bees	26	9	3	14	46	51	−5	30	
9	Milton Keynes Dons	26	8	5	13	34	42	−8	29	
10	Plymouth Argyle	26	9	2	15	46	61	−15	29	
11	Cardiff City Ladies (R)	26	8	2	16	33	52	−19	24 (Note: Cardiff City were deducted one point for failing to fulfil a fixture against Southampton on 9 October 2021. Deducted further one point for failing to fulfil another fixture)	Relegation to the Division One South West
12	Chichester & Selsey (R)	26	7	3	16	31	60	−29	24	Relegation to the Division One South West
13	Keynsham Town (R)	26	6	0	20	31	110	−79	18	Relegation to the Division One South West
14	Hounslow (R)	26	0	0	26	5	122	−117	0	Relegation to the Division One South East

Source: The Football Association
Rules for classification: 1) Points; 2) Goal difference; 3) Number of goals scored
(C) Champions; (O) Play-off winners; (P) Promoted; (R) Relegated

==== Results ====
Home \ Away	BWU	CAR	CHI	CRA	GIL	HOU	IPS	KEY	LON	MKD	OXF	PLY	POR	SOU
Bridgwater United	—	4–1	4–0	3–1	0–0	5–0	0–1	9–0	1–0	2–0	1–0	3–0	0–2	0–2
Cardiff City Ladies	0–1	—	3–2	1–3	0–1	4–0	0–3	2–1	4–1	3–2	0–3	1–5	0–1	0–4
Chichester & Selsey	1–0	1–2	—	2–1	1–1	3–0	0–4	3–1	0–5	1–3	1–0	2–1	0–1	0–2
Crawley Wasps	1–2	3–0	5–0	—	4–2	4–1	0–2	4–2	1–2	1–0	1–0	2–0	3–2	0–3
Gillingham	0–0	2–1	4–1	1–0	—	2–0	0–3	H-W	2–1	0–0	0–1	3–2	3–0	0–2
Hounslow	0–3	0–5	1–7	1–7	0–3	—	0–6	0–1	0–1	0–1	0–3	0–2	0–11	0–9
Ipswich Town	1–0	1–0	1–1	1–0	0–0	9–0	—	11–2	3–0	3–0	0–1	2–0	1–1	1–2
Keynsham Town	0–2	0–2	2–1	3–1	0–8	6–2	2–5	—	2–0	2–1	0–3	1–5	2–3	1–9
London Bees	0–3	5–1	1–1	1–5	4–0	5–0	1–3	5–1	—	1–1	1–2	2–2	0–4	1–2
Milton Keynes Dons	1–1	1–1	2–1	0–2	1–2	5–0	0–0	5–1	1–5	—	1–0	3–1	0–1	0–1
Oxford United	3–0	2–0	3–0	3–1	2–0	7–0	3–1	9–0	5–1	5–1	—	3–0	3–1	1–1
Plymouth Argyle	1–1	2–1	2–1	3–4	1–3	5–0	0–5	5–0	0–3	5–1	0–5	—	2–1	0–3
Portsmouth	0–2	0–0	3–1	2–3	0–0	3–0	1–0	6–1	2–0	0–3	1–1	5–1	—	0–1
Southampton	1–1	4–1	8–0	3–0	9–0	5–0	0–2	9–0	5–0	3–1	3–3	6–1	2–0	—

Source: The Football Association
Legend: Blue = home team win; Yellow = draw; Red = away team win.

=== Championship play-off ===
The overall FA WNL champion was decided by a play-off match held at the end of the season between the Northern Division and Southern Division winners. The play-off match winner also earned promotion to the FA Women's Championship subject to meeting licensing requirements. The game was broadcast live on BBC iPlayer and the BBC Sport website.

21 May 2022
15:00 BST (UTC+01:00)

Southampton	1–0	Wolverhampton Wanderers
Pharoah 21'	Report

Edgeley Park, Stockport
Attendance: 1,354

== Division One ==
=== Division One North ===
FA Women's National League Division One North
- Season: 2021–22
- Champions: Liverpool Feds
- Promoted: Liverpool Feds
- Relegated: F.C. United of Manchester; Chester-le-Street; Alnwick Town
- Matches: 156
- Goals: 545 (3.49 per match)
- Top goalscorer: Katie Barker (Newcastle United) (21 goals)
- Biggest home win: Newcastle United 10–0 F.C. United of Manchester (9 January 2022)
- Biggest away win: F.C. United of Manchester 0–6 Newcastle United (15 August 2021)
- Highest scoring: Leeds United 5–5 Durham Cestria (10 October 2021); Newcastle United 10–0 F.C. United of Manchester (9 January 2022)

Changes from last season:

- Following the second consecutive curtailment of the season amid the COVID-19 pandemic in March 2021, it was decided that upward club movement within the women's football pyramid would be done via application. All clubs from tiers 3 to 6 were eligible to apply to move into the league immediately one tier above where they currently played with applications marked against a criterion weighted 75% on-field and 25% off-field.
- Brighouse Town were promoted to Northern Premier Division via application.
- Alnwick Town were promoted from North East Regional Women's Football League via application.
- F.C. United of Manchester were promoted from North West Women's Regional Football League via application.
- Bolton Ladies folded and withdrew from the league prior to the start of the 2021–22 season.

Club	Home ground	Position 2020–21
Alnwick Town	St James Park, Alnwick	NEWRFL, N/A
Barnsley	Barnsley FC Academy, Barnsley	N/A
Bradford City	Plumpton Park, Wrose	N/A
Chester-le-Street	Moor Park, Chester Moor	N/A
Chorley	Blainscough Park, Coppull	N/A
Durham Cestria	The Graham Sports Centre, Durham	N/A
F.C. United of Manchester	Broadhurst Park, Moston	NWWRFL, N/A
Leeds United	Ings Lane, Tadcaster	N/A
Liverpool Feds	Jericho Lane, Liverpool	N/A
Newcastle United	Druid Park, Woolsington	N/A
Norton & Stockton Ancients	Station Road, Norton, County Durham	N/A
Stockport County	Stockport Sports Village, Stockport	N/A

==== League table ====
Pos	Team	Pld	W	D	L	GF	GA	GD	Pts	Promotion or relegation
1	Liverpool Feds (C, P)	22	19	2	1	60	11	+49	59	Promotion to the Northern Premier Division
2	Newcastle United	22	18	2	2	85	16	+69	56	
3	Durham Cestria	22	13	2	7	65	35	+30	41	
4	Leeds United	22	12	4	6	51	34	+17	40	
5	Chorley	22	8	10	4	39	34	+5	34	
6	Stockport County	22	7	6	9	44	42	+2	27	
7	Bradford City	22	7	5	10	39	48	−9	26	
8	Norton & Stockton Ancients	22	7	5	10	35	45	−10	26	
9	Barnsley	22	8	2	12	41	51	−10	23 (Note: Barnsley were deducted three points)	
10	F.C. United of Manchester (R)	22	6	3	13	34	72	−38	21	Relegation from the National League
11	Chester-le-Street (R)	22	3	5	14	28	62	−34	14	Relegation from the National League
12	Alnwick Town (R)	22	0	2	20	24	95	−71	2	Relegation from the National League

Source: The Football Association
Rules for classification: 1) Points; 2) Goal difference; 3) Number of goals scored
(C) Champions; (P) Promoted; (R) Relegated

=== Division One Midlands ===
FA Women's National League Division One Midlands
- Season: 2021–22
- Champions: Boldmere St. Michaels
- Promoted: Boldmere St. Michaels
- Relegated: Burton Albion; Bedworth United
- Matches: 132
- Goals: 522 (3.95 per match)
- Top goalscorer: Jasmine Saxton (Doncaster Rovers Belles) (17 goals)
- Biggest home win: Solihull Moors 8–0 Leek Town (15 August 2021); Lincoln City 9–1 Bedworth United (27 February 2022)
- Biggest away win: Bedworth United 0–10 Leafield Athletic (2 February 2022)
- Highest scoring: Leek Town 2–9 Doncaster Rovers Belles (23 January 2022)

Changes from last season:

- Following the second consecutive curtailment of the season amid the COVID-19 pandemic in March 2021, it was decided that upward club movement within the women's football pyramid would be done via application. All clubs from tiers 3 to 6 were eligible to apply to move into the league immediately one tier above where they currently played with applications marked against a criterion weighted 75% on-field and 25% off-field.
- Wolverhampton Wanderers were promoted to Northern Premier Division via application.
- Leek Town were promoted from West Midlands Regional Women's Football League via application.
- Peterborough United were promoted from East Midlands Regional Women's Football League via application.
- Holwell Sports folded on 3 January 2022 and their results were removed from the league table.

Club	Home ground	Position 2020–21
Bedworth United	The Oval, Bedworth	N/A
Boldmere St. Michaels	Trevor Brown Memorial Ground, Sutton Coldfield	N/A
Burton Albion	Hillsfield, Rocester	N/A
Doncaster Rovers Belles	Oxford Street, Rossington	N/A
Holwell Sports	Welby Road, Asfordby Hill	N/A
Leafield Athletic	Dickens Heath Sports Club, Solihull	N/A
Leek Town	Harrison Park, Leek	WMRWFL, N/A
Lincoln City	Moorlands Sports Ground, Lincoln	N/A
Long Eaton United	Grange Park, Long Eaton	N/A
Peterborough United	Mick George Training Academy, Orton	EMRWFL, N/A
Solihull Moors	Damson Park, Solihull	N/A
Sporting Khalsa	Aspray Arena, Willenhall	N/A
Wem Town	Butler Sports Centre, Wem	N/A

==== League table ====
Pos	Team	Pld	W	D	L	GF	GA	GD	Pts	Promotion or relegation
1	Boldmere St. Michaels (C, P)	22	16	3	3	59	20	+39	51	Promotion to the Northern Premier Division
2	Doncaster Rovers Belles	22	15	4	3	55	21	+34	49	
3	Lincoln City	22	15	3	4	68	30	+38	48	
4	Long Eaton United	22	11	5	6	44	27	+17	38	
5	Leek Town	22	10	3	9	51	52	−1	33	
6	Sporting Khalsa	22	9	5	8	37	37	0	32	
7	Solihull Moors	22	9	3	10	55	47	+8	30	
8	Peterborough United	22	8	5	9	45	50	−5	29	
9	Leafield Athletic	22	7	5	10	35	45	−10	26	
10	Wem Town (N)	22	3	6	13	24	47	−23	15	Relegation to the National League
11	Burton Albion (R)	22	4	3	15	26	63	−37	15	Relegation to the National League
12	Bedworth United (R)	22	2	1	19	23	83	−60	7	Relegation to the National League
13	Holwell Sports (W)	0	0	0	0	0	0	0	0	Club withdrew

Source: The Football Association
Rules for classification: 1) Points; 2) Goal difference; 3) Number of goals scored
(C) Champions; (N) Not relegated; (P) Promoted; (R) Relegated; (W) Withdrew from the league

=== Division One South East ===
FA Women's National League Division One South East
- Season: 2021–22
- Champions: Billericay Town
- Promoted: Billericay Town
- Relegated: Enfield Town; Stevenage; Harlow Town; Kent Football United
- Matches: 156
- Goals: 550 (3.53 per match)
- Top goalscorer: Ashlee Hincks (AFC Wimbledon) (27 goals)
- Biggest home win: AFC Wimbledon 8–0 Cambridge United (1 May 2022)
- Biggest away win: Norwich City 0–8 Billericay Town (15 August 2021); Stevenage 1–9 AFC Wimbledon (26 September 2021); Harlow Town 0–8 Hashtag United (10 October 2021)
- Highest scoring: Stevenage 1–9 AFC Wimbledon (26 September 2021)

Changes from last season:

- Following the second consecutive curtailment of the season amid the COVID-19 pandemic in March 2021, it was decided that upward club movement within the women's football pyramid would be done via application. All clubs from tiers 3 to 6 were eligible to apply to move into the league immediately one tier above where they currently played with applications marked against a criterion weighted 75% on-field and 25% off-field.
- Ipswich Town were promoted to Southern Premier Division via application.
- Harlow Town were promoted from Eastern Region Women's Football League via application.
- Queens Park Rangers were promoted from London and South East Women's Regional Football League via application.
- Leyton Orient were rebranded London Seaward after Leyton Orient severed ties with the club.

Club	Home ground	Position 2020–21
Actonians	Rectory Park, Northolt	N/A
AFC Wimbledon	New Plough Lane, Wimbledon	N/A
Billericay Town	New Lodge, Billericay	N/A
Cambridge City	The Demcom Stadium, Ely	N/A
Cambridge United	Rowley Park, St Neots	N/A
Enfield Town	Queen Elizabeth II Stadium, Enfield	N/A
Harlow Town	The Harlow Arena, Harlow	ERWFL, N/A
Hashtag United	Park Lane, Canvey Island	N/A
Kent Football United	Glentworth Sports Club, Kent	N/A
London Seaward	Hornchurch Stadium, Upminster	N/A (as Leyton Orient)
Norwich City	The Nest, Horsford	N/A
Queens Park Rangers	Powerday Stadium, Perivale	LSEWRFL, N/A
Stevenage	Hertingfordbury Park, Hertford	N/A

==== League table ====
Pos	Team	Pld	W	D	L	GF	GA	GD	Pts	Promotion or relegation
1	Billericay Town (C, P)	24	20	3	1	77	15	+62	63	Promotion to the Southern Premier Division
2	Hashtag United	24	20	2	2	83	14	+69	62	
3	AFC Wimbledon	24	16	5	3	62	15	+47	53	
4	Queens Park Rangers	24	12	5	7	46	40	+6	41	
5	Actonians	24	11	7	6	52	26	+26	40	
6	London Seaward	24	7	8	9	31	43	−12	29	
7	Cambridge City	24	7	5	12	36	48	−12	26	
8	Norwich City	24	8	2	14	33	56	−23	26	
9	Cambridge United	24	8	2	14	29	60	−31	26	
10	Enfield Town (R)	24	6	6	12	36	37	−1	24	Relegation from the National League
11	Stevenage (R)	24	6	4	14	19	61	−42	22	Relegation from the National League
12	Harlow Town (R)	24	5	2	17	27	73	−46	17	Relegation from the National League
13	Kent Football United (R)	24	3	3	18	19	62	−43	12	Relegation from the National League

Source: The Football Association
Rules for classification: 1) Points; 2) Goal difference; 3) Number of goals scored
(C) Champions; (P) Promoted; (R) Relegated

=== Division One South West ===
FA Women's National League Division One South West
- Season: 2021–22
- Champions: Cheltenham Town
- Promoted: Cheltenham Town
- Relegated: Poole Town
- Matches: 90
- Goals: 328 (3.64 per match)
- Top goalscorer: Becki Bath (Bournemouth); Connie Pengelly (Exeter City) (15 goals)
- Biggest home win: Southampton Women 7–0 Portishead Town (10 October 2021)
- Biggest away win: Poole Town 0–7 Exeter City (10 April 2022)
- Highest scoring: Bournemouth 8–2 Portishead Town (6 February 2022)

Changes from last season:

- Following the second consecutive curtailment of the season amid the COVID-19 pandemic in March 2021, it was decided that upward club movement within the women's football pyramid would be done via application. All clubs from tiers 3 to 6 were eligible to apply to move into the league immediately one tier above where they currently played with applications marked against a criterion weighted 75% on-field and 25% off-field.
- Southampton were promoted to Southern Premier Division via application.
- Brislington took voluntary relegation to South West Regional Women's Football League.
- Bournemouth were promoted from Southern Region Women's Football League via application.
- Portishead Town were promoted from South West Regional Women's Football League via application.
- Buckland Athletic withdrew from the league on 7 December 2021 and their results were removed from the league table.

Club	Home ground	Position 2020–21
Bournemouth	Potterne Park, Verwood	SRWFL, N/A
Buckland Athletic	Homers Heath, Newton Abbot	N/A
Cheltenham Town	Corinum Stadium, Cirencester	N/A
Chesham United	The Meadow, Chesham	N/A
Exeter City	Cullompton Cricket Club, Cullompton	N/A
Larkhall Athletic	Larkhall Sports Club, Larkhall	N/A
Maidenhead United	York Road, Maidenhead	N/A
Poole Town	Dorset County Ground, Poole	N/A
Portishead Town	Bristol Road, Portishead	SWRWFL, N/A
Southampton Women	Arlebury Park, New Alresford	N/A
Swindon Town	Cinder Lane, Fairford	N/A

==== League table ====
Pos	Team	Pld	W	D	L	GF	GA	GD	Pts	Promotion or relegation
1	Cheltenham Town (C, P)	18	14	3	1	44	12	+32	45	Promotion to the Southern Premier Division
2	AFC Bournemouth	18	12	4	2	52	14	+38	40	
3	Exeter City	18	12	2	4	52	19	+33	38	
4	Southampton Women	18	11	4	3	47	14	+33	37	
5	Chesham United	18	8	2	8	31	32	−1	26	
6	Maidenhead United	18	6	4	8	26	32	−6	22	
7	Swindon Town	18	5	4	9	30	31	−1	19	
8	Portishead Town	18	4	4	10	23	44	−21	15 (Note: Portishead Town were deducted one point)	
9	Larkhall Athletic	18	2	4	12	20	52	−32	10	
10	Poole Town (R)	18	0	1	17	3	78	−75	1	Relegation from the National League
11	Buckland Athletic (W)	0	0	0	0	0	0	0	0	Club withdrew

Source: The Football Association
Rules for classification: 1) Points; 2) Goal difference; 3) Number of goals scored
(C) Champions; (P) Promoted; (R) Relegated; (W) Withdrew from the league

== See also ==
- 2021–22 FA Women's National League Cup
- 2021–22 FA Women's National League Plate
- 2021–22 FA WSL (tier 1)
- 2021–22 FA Women's Championship (tier 2)
