= 2023–24 FA Women's National League =

FA Women's National League
- Season: 2023–24

The 2023–24 FA Women's National League is the 33rd season of the competition, and the sixth since a restructure and rebranding of the top four tiers of English football by The Football Association. Starting in 1991, it was previously known as the FA Women's Premier League. It sits at the third and fourth levels of the women's football pyramid, below the Women's Championship and above the eight regional football leagues.

The league features six regional divisions: the Northern and Southern Premier divisions at level three of the pyramid, and Division One North, Division One Midlands, Division One South East, and Division One South West at the fourth level. The league consists of 72 teams, divided into six divisions of 12 each. In a change from previous seasons, both winners of the Northern and Southern Premier divisions will be promoted to the Women's Championship. The bottom two teams will be relegated to the appropriate fourth tier FA WNL Division One. The winner of each Division One will be promoted to the Northern or Southern Premier Division, with the bottom two teams in those leagues relegated to respective regional leagues.

== Premier Division ==
=== Northern Premier Division ===
FA Women's National League Northern Premier Division
- Season: 2023–24
- Champions: Newcastle United
- Promoted: Newcastle United
- Relegated: Huddersfield Town; AFC Fylde
- Matches: 132
- Goals: 498 (3.77 per match)
- Top goalscorer: Heidi Logan (Stoke City) (14 goals)
- Biggest home win: Newcastle United 10–0 Huddersfield Town (14 April 2024)
- Biggest away win: Stourbridge 0–8 Wolverhampton Wanderers (3 April 2024)
- Highest scoring: Newcastle United 11–3 AFC Fylde (17 December 2023)

Changes from last season:

- Despite winning the Northern Division, Nottingham Forest lost the Championship play-off and therefore remained in the Premier Division.
- Newcastle United were promoted from Division One North as champions.
- Stourbridge were promoted from Division One Midlands as champions.
- Boldmere St. Michaels were relegated to Division One Midlands.
- Loughborough Lightning were relegated to Division One Midlands.
- Brighouse Town rebranded as Halifax F.C. Women in May 2023.

Club	Home ground	Position 2022–23
AFC Fylde	Kelamergh Park, Warton	7th
Burnley	Lancashire County Ground, Leyland	3rd
Derby County	Don Amott Arena, Derby	4th
Halifax		5th (Brighouse Town)
Huddersfield Town	The Stafflex Arena, Kirkburton	6th
Liverpool Feds	Jericho Lane, Liverpool	9th
Newcastle United	Kingston Park Stadium, Newcastle	WNL D1 North, 1st
Nottingham Forest	Grange Park, Long Eaton	1st
Stoke City	Norton Cricket Club, Stoke-on-Trent	10th
Stourbridge	War Memorial Ground, Stourbridge	WNL D1 Midlands, 1st
West Bromwich Albion	Keys Park, Hednesford	8th
Wolverhampton Wanderers	New Bucks Head, Telford	2nd

Location of Northern Premier Division clubs for the 2023–24 season

==== League table ====
Pos	Team	Pld	W	D	L	GF	GA	GD	Pts	Qualification
1	Newcastle United (C, P)	22	19	2	1	79	11	+68	59	Promotion to the Championship
2	Burnley	22	15	3	4	54	21	+33	48	
3	Nottingham Forest	22	15	2	5	59	21	+38	47	
4	Wolverhampton Wanderers	22	14	2	6	58	24	+34	44	
5	Stoke City	22	10	4	8	41	37	+4	34	
6	Halifax	22	8	7	7	34	39	−5	31	
7	Derby County	22	9	2	11	41	34	+7	29	
8	Liverpool Feds	22	7	6	9	35	48	−13	27	
9	West Bromwich Albion	22	8	2	12	29	42	−13	26	
10	Stourbridge	22	4	4	14	29	75	−46	16	
11	Huddersfield Town (R)	22	2	3	17	20	65	−45	9	Relegation to the Division One North
12	AFC Fylde (R)	22	1	3	18	19	81	−62	6	Relegation to the Division One North

Updated to match(es) played on 5 May 2024. Source:
Rules for classification: 1) Points; 2) Goal difference; 3) Number of goals scored
(C) Champions; (P) Promoted; (R) Relegated

==== Results ====
Home \ Away	FYL	BUR	DER	HFX	HUD	LIV	NEW	NOT	STK	STR	WBA	WOL
AFC Fylde	—	0–3	0–4	2–2	2–1	2–2	0–4	0–6	1–2	0–2	2–2	0–3
Burnley	9–0	—	0–2	2–0	3–1	3–0	0–3	4–2	2–1	4–1	3–1	1–1
Derby County	2–1	0–2	—	3–3	3–1	4–3	0–1	1–1	1–2	2–0	0–1	1–2
Halifax	6–1	1–2	1–0	—	1–0	2–1	0–0	2–1	1–3	3–3	2–1	2–1
Huddersfield Town	4–2	1–5	0–4	0–0	—	1–1	0–4	0–2	2–1	3–3	1–2	0–2
Liverpool Feds	2–1	2–3	3–2	1–1	3–1	—	0–4	1–1	1–1	1–1	2–1	1–2
Newcastle United	11–3	0–0	2–1	7–0	10–0	5–1	—	1–2	3–1	5–0	1–0	3–0
Nottingham Forest	3–1	2–1	1–2	3–0	2–1	5–0	0–1	—	2–0	7–0	3–0	2–0
Stoke City	5–0	1–0	2–0	1–1	4–0	3–5	1–4	1–5	—	4–1	2–1	2–1
Stourbridge	2–1	0–4	1–7	1–5	3–2	2–3	0–3	0–2	2–2	—	7–2	0–8
West Bromwich Albion	1–0	1–1	2–1	1–0	4–1	0–2	0–4	1–4	3–1	4–0	—	1–3
Wolverhampton Wanderers	5–0	1–2	5–1	5–1	4–0	3–0	2–3	4–3	1–1	3–0	2–0	—

Updated to match(es) played on 5 May 2024. Source:
Legend: Blue = home team win; Yellow = draw; Red = away team win.

==== Top scorers ====
As of match(es) played 5 May 2024

Rank	Player	Club	Goals
1	(England) Heidi Logan	Stoke City	14
2	(England) Charlotte Greengrass	Nottingham Forest	13
3	(England) Amber Hughes	Wolverhampton Wanderers	12
4	(England) Katie Barker	Newcastle United	11
4	(England) Bridget Galloway	Newcastle United	11
4	(England) Holly Manders	Nottingham Forest	11
7	(England) Georgia Gibson	Newcastle United	10
8	(England) Paige Cole	Liverpool Feds	9
8	(England) Bethany Donoghue	Liverpool Feds	9
8	(England) Aimee Kelly	Burnley	9
8	(England) Jasmine McQuade	Newcastle United	9
8	(England) Millie Ravening	Burnley	9
8	(England) Amy Sims	Derby County	9

=== Southern Premier Division ===
FA Women's National League Southern Premier Division
- Season: 2023–24
- Champions: Portsmouth
- Promoted: Portsmouth
- Relegated: Chatham Town; London Bees
- Matches: 132
- Goals: 498 (3.77 per match)
- Top goalscorer: Natasha Thomas (Ipswich Town) (20 goals)
- Biggest home win: Portsmouth 9–0 Cardiff City Ladies (3 September 2023); Portsmouth 10–1 London Bees (5 May 2024)
- Biggest away win: Chatham Town 0–8 Portsmouth (17 September 2023)
- Highest scoring: Portsmouth 10–1 London Bees (5 May 2024)

Changes from last season:

- Watford were promoted to Championship as National League champions.
- Coventry United were relegated from Championship and re-affiliated as Rugby Borough.
- Cardiff City Ladies were promoted from Division One South West as champions.
- Hashtag United were promoted from Division One South East as champions.
- Bridgwater United were relegated to Division One South West.
- Crawley Wasps were relegated to Division One South East.
- Gillingham re-affiliated as Chatham Town.

Club	Home ground	Position 2022–23
Billericay Town	New Lodge, Billericay	6th
Cardiff City Ladies	CCB Centre for Sporting Excellence, Ystrad Mynach	WNL D1 South West, 1st
Chatham Town	Bauvil Stadium, Chatham	7th (as Gillingham)
Cheltenham Town	Corinum Stadium, Cirencester	8th
Hashtag United	Parkside, Aveley	WNL D1 South East, 1st
Ipswich Town	The Goldstar Ground, Felixstowe	2nd
London Bees	The Hive, Edgware	9th
Milton Keynes Dons	Stadium MK, Milton Keynes	5th
Oxford United	Marsh Lane, Marston	3rd
Plymouth Argyle	Manadon Sports Hub, Plymouth	10th
Portsmouth	Westleigh Park, Havant	4th
Rugby Borough	Kilsby Lane, Rugby	Championship, 12th (as Coventry United)

Location of Southern Premier Division clubs for the 2022–23 season

==== League table ====
Pos	Team	Pld	W	D	L	GF	GA	GD	Pts	Qualification
1	Portsmouth (C, P)	22	20	1	1	86	10	+76	61	Promotion to the Championship
2	Hashtag United	22	17	1	4	43	18	+25	52	
3	Rugby Borough	22	16	0	6	54	29	+25	48	
4	Ipswich Town	22	14	2	6	64	24	+40	44	
5	Oxford United	22	14	2	6	47	27	+20	44	
6	Milton Keynes Dons	22	10	5	7	35	29	+6	35	
7	Cheltenham Town	22	7	3	12	35	52	−17	24	
8	Cardiff City Ladies	22	6	4	12	30	47	−17	22	
9	Plymouth Argyle	22	6	3	13	35	65	−30	21	
10	Billericay Town	22	4	6	12	37	49	−12	18	
11	Chatham Town (R)	22	0	6	16	15	64	−49	6	Relegation to the Division One South East
12	London Bees (R)	22	0	3	19	17	84	−67	3	Relegation to the Division One South East

Updated to match(es) played on 5 May 2024. Source:
Rules for classification: 1) Points; 2) Goal difference; 3) Number of goals scored
(C) Champions; (P) Promoted; (R) Relegated

==== Results ====
Home \ Away	BIL	CAR	CHA	CHL	HSH	IPS	LON	MKD	OXF	PLY	POR	RUG
Billericay Town	—	3–3	5–1	0–1	1–2	2–2	4–2	1–1	0–2	1–1	0–1	2–3
Cardiff City Ladies	2–1	—	1–1	2–1	0–1	1–2	2–2	0–2	1–2	2–1	1–2	2–3
Chatham Town	0–0	0–2	—	0–3	1–3	1–6	0–0	1–2	2–3	1–2	0–8	2–3
Cheltenham Town	4–2	2–2	0–0	—	0–3	2–2	3–2	4–3	0–1	2–3	2–3	0–4
Hashtag United	2–0	3–1	1–0	0–1	—	3–2	3–0	1–2	3–0	2–0	1–0	1–0
Ipswich Town	1–0	4–2	5–0	8–0	2–0	—	5–0	1–0	0–1	7–1	0–1	4–1
London Bees	1–6	0–4	1–1	3–6	0–3	1–6	—	0–3	1–4	1–2	0–4	0–5
Milton Keynes Dons	1–1	3–0	3–0	1–0	2–3	0–1	2–0	—	2–2	3–4	0–0	1–0
Oxford United	8–0	1–0	4–0	2–1	1–2	2–1	3–1	1–1	—	5–0	1–5	0–2
Plymouth Argyle	0–6	1–2	3–3	3–2	2–2	1–3	5–1	1–2	0–4	—	1–3	2–4
Portsmouth	7–0	9–0	7–0	5–0	2–1	4–2	10–1	3–0	4–0	3–0	—	4–0
Rugby Borough	4–2	3–0	2–1	3–1	1–3	1–0	3–0	5–1	1–0	6–2	0–1	—

Updated to match(es) played on 5 May 2024. Source:
Legend: Blue = home team win; Yellow = draw; Red = away team win.

==== Top scorers ====
As of match(es) played 5 May 2024

Rank	Player	Club	Goals
1	(England) Natasha Thomas	Ipswich Town	20
2	(England) Zoe Barratt	Oxford United	17
3	(England) Ellie Sara	Plymouth Argyle	16
4	(England) Maddie Biggs	Billericay Town	13
4	(England) Lily Greenslade	Rugby Borough	13
6	(Wales) Phoebie Poole	Cheltenham Town	12
7	(England) Sophie Quirk	Portsmouth	11
8	(Wales) Emma Jones	Portsmouth	10
8	(England) Beth Lumsden	Portsmouth	10
8	(England) Samantha Rowland	Hashtag United	10
8	(England) Lenna Williams	Ipswich Town	10

== Division One ==
=== Division One North ===
FA Women's National League Division One North
- Season: 2023–24
- Champions: Hull City
- Promoted: Hull City
- Relegated: Chester-le-Street Town; F.C. United of Manchester
- Matches: 132
- Goals: 457 (3.46 per match)
- Top goalscorer: Helen Lynskey (Hull City) (19 goals)
- Biggest home win: Middlesbrough 6–0 F.C. United of Manchester (5 November 2023); Hull City 6–0 FC United of Manchester (3 December 2023)
- Biggest away win: FC United of Manchester 1–7 Doncaster Rovers Belles (20 August 2023); FC United of Manchester 0–6 Barnsley (17 December 2023)
- Highest scoring: FC United of Manchester 5–4 Chester-le-Street Town (17 September 2023); FC United of Manchester 5–4 Leeds United (4 April 2024)

Changes from last season:

- Newcastle United were promoted to Northern Premier Division as Division One North champions.
- Doncaster Rovers Belles were realigned from Division One Midlands.
- Chester-le-Street Town were promoted from North East Regional Women's Football League as champions.
- F.C. United of Manchester were promoted from North West Women's Regional Football League as champions.
- Bradford City were relegated to North East Regional Women's Football League.
- Merseyrail were relegated to North West Women's Regional Football League.

Club	Home ground	Position 2022–23
Barnsley	Wombwell Recreation Ground, Wombwell	4th
Chester-le-Street Town	Moor Park, Chester-le-Street	NERWFL, 1st
Chorley	Blainscough Park, Coppull	8th
Doncaster Rovers Belles	Eco-Power Stadium, Doncaster	WNL D1 Midlands, 2nd
Durham Cestria	The Graham Sports Centre, Durham	2nd
F.C. United of Manchester	Broadhurst Park, Moston	NWWRFL, 1st
Hull City	Haworth Park, Kingston upon Hull	5th
Leeds United	Bannister Prentice Stadium, Garforth	6th
Middlesbrough	Bishopton Road West, Stockton	10th
Norton & Stockton Ancients	Station Road, Norton, County Durham	7th
Stockport County	Stockport Sports Village, Stockport	3rd
York City	Haxby Road Sports Park, York	9th

Location of Division One North clubs for the 2023–24 season

==== League table ====
Pos	Team	Pld	W	D	L	GF	GA	GD	Pts	Qualification
1	Hull City (C, P)	22	17	2	3	63	24	+39	53	Promotion to the Northern Premier Division
2	Middlesbrough	22	13	7	2	45	21	+24	46	
3	Durham Cestria	22	13	4	5	41	16	+25	43	
4	Barnsley	22	13	4	5	50	27	+23	43	
5	Stockport County	22	9	8	5	33	22	+11	35	
6	Leeds United	22	10	4	8	46	40	+6	34	
7	Doncaster Rovers Belles	22	9	4	9	42	41	+1	31	
8	Chorley	22	7	4	11	33	48	−15	25	
9	Norton & Stockton Ancients	22	5	6	11	26	39	−13	21	
10	York City	22	4	5	13	31	44	−13	17	
11	Chester-le-Street Town (R)	22	4	2	16	27	55	−28	14	Relegation from the National League
12	F.C. United of Manchester (R)	22	2	2	18	20	80	−60	8	Relegation from the National League

Updated to match(es) played on 5 May 2024. Source:
Rules for classification: 1) Points; 2) Goal difference; 3) Number of goals scored
(C) Champions; (P) Promoted; (R) Relegated

=== Division One Midlands ===
FA Women's National League Division One Midlands
- Season: 2023–24
- Champions: Sporting Khalsa
- Promoted: Sporting Khalsa
- Relegated: Sheffield; Leek Town
- Matches: 132
- Goals: 494 (3.74 per match)
- Top goalscorer: Jade Bell (Northampton Town) (20 goals)
- Biggest home win: Sporting Khalsa 11–0 Notts County (5 November 2023)
- Biggest away win: Leafield Athletic 0–6 Loughborough Lightning (24 September 2023); Notts County 0–6 Northampton Town (4 February 2024); Solihull Moors 0–6 Northampton Town (19 March 2024)
- Highest scoring: Sporting Khalsa 11–0 Notts County (5 November 2023)

Changes from last season:

- Stourbridge were promoted to Northern Premier Division as Division One Midlands champions.
- Boldmere St. Michaels were relegated from Northern Premier Division.
- Loughborough Lightning were relegated from Northern Premier Division.
- Doncaster Rovers Belles were realigned to Division One North.
- Notts County were promoted from East Midlands Regional Women's Football League as champions.
- Sutton Coldfield Town were promoted from West Midlands Regional Women's Football League as champions.
- Long Eaton United were relegated to East Midlands Regional Women's Football League.
- Wem Town were relegated but were not allocated to a division by The FA.

Club	Home ground	Position 2022–23
Boldmere St. Michaels	Trevor Brown Memorial Ground, Sutton Coldfield	WNL North, 11th
Leafield Athletic	Dickens Heath Sports Club, Solihull	9th
Leek Town	Harrison Park, Leek	10th
Lincoln City	Moorlands Sports Ground, Lincoln	6th
Loughborough Lightning	Loughborough University Stadium, Loughborough	WNL North, 12th
Northampton Town	Fernie Fields, Northampton	5th
Notts County	RM Stadium, Hucknall	EMRWFL, 1st
Peterborough United	Mick George Training Academy, Orton	4th
Sheffield	Home of Football Ground, Dronfield	8th
Solihull Moors	Damson Park, Solihull	7th
Sporting Khalsa	Aspray Arena, Willenhall	3rd
Sutton Coldfield Town	Central Ground, Sutton Coldfield	WMRWFL, 1st

Location of Division One Midlands clubs for the 2023–24 season

==== League table ====
Pos	Team	Pld	W	D	L	GF	GA	GD	Pts	Qualification
1	Sporting Khalsa (C, P)	22	17	2	3	80	23	+57	53	Promotion to the Northern Premier Division
2	Loughborough Lightning	22	16	5	1	59	21	+38	53	
3	Peterborough United	22	15	2	5	63	37	+26	47	
4	Boldmere St. Michaels	22	14	2	6	39	26	+13	44	
5	Northampton Town	22	12	2	8	53	33	+20	38	
6	Solihull Moors	22	8	3	11	34	42	−8	27	
7	Sutton Coldfield Town	22	7	4	11	35	38	−3	25	
8	Lincoln City	22	5	7	10	41	50	−9	22	
9	Leafield Athletic	22	4	6	12	25	50	−25	18	
10	Notts County	22	4	4	14	25	76	−51	16	
11	Sheffield (R)	22	3	6	13	15	41	−26	15	Relegation from the National League
12	Leek Town (R)	22	3	5	14	25	57	−32	14	Relegation from the National League

Updated to match(es) played on 9 May 2024. Source:
Rules for classification: 1) Points; 2) Goal difference; 3) Number of goals scored
(C) Champions; (P) Promoted; (R) Relegated

=== Division One South East ===
FA Women's National League Division One South East
- Season: 2023–24
- Champions: AFC Wimbledon
- Promoted: AFC Wimbledon
- Relegated: Cambridge City; Haywards Heath Town
- Matches: 132
- Goals: 577 (4.37 per match)
- Top goalscorer: Ashlee Hincks (AFC Wimbledon) (34 goals)
- Biggest home win: AFC Wimbledon 8–1 Cambridge City (8 October 2023)
- Biggest away win: Cambridge City 0–6 AFC Wimbledon (24 March 2024)
- Highest scoring: Chesham United 6–5 Ashford Town (10 March 2024); Cambridge United 3–8 AFC Wimbledon (24 September 2023); Chesham United 8–3 Cambridge City (10 September 2023)

Changes from last season:

- Hashtag United were promoted to Southern Premier Division as Division One South East champions.
- Crawley Wasps were relegated from Southern Premier Division and merged to become Haywards Heath Town.
- Worthing were promoted from London and South East Women's Regional Football League as champions.
- AFC Sudbury were promoted from Eastern Region Women's Football League as champions.
- As a result of Wymondham Town and Hounslow both withdrawing during the 2022–23 season, no teams were relegated from Division One South East.

Club	Home ground	Position 2022–23
Actonians	Rectory Park, Northolt	3rd
AFC Sudbury		ERWFL, 1st
AFC Wimbledon	Plough Lane, Wimbledon	2nd
Ashford Town	Robert Parker Stadium, Stanwell	6th
Cambridge City	The Demcom Stadium, Ely	9th
Cambridge United	Rowley Park, St Neots	8th
Chesham United	The Meadow, Chesham	10th
Haywards Heath Town		WNL South, 12th (as Crawley Wasps)
London Seaward	Hornchurch Stadium, Upminster	5th
Norwich City	The Nest, Horsford	4th
Queens Park Rangers	Powerday Stadium, Perivale	7th
Worthing	Woodside Road, Worthing	LSEWRFL, 1st

Location of Division One South East clubs for the 2023–24 season

==== League table ====
Pos	Team	Pld	W	D	L	GF	GA	GD	Pts	Qualification
1	AFC Wimbledon (C, P)	22	18	2	2	90	29	+61	56	Promotion to the Southern Premier Division
2	Norwich City	22	14	7	1	66	24	+42	49	
3	Worthing	22	13	6	3	48	25	+23	45	
4	Ashford Town	22	10	6	6	54	44	+10	36	
5	Queens Park Rangers	22	10	6	6	54	47	+7	36	
6	Actonians	22	10	4	8	50	45	+5	34	
7	Cambridge United	22	8	7	7	43	45	−2	31	
8	London Seaward	22	7	8	7	42	37	+5	29	
9	Chesham United	22	5	4	13	46	77	−31	19	
10	AFC Sudbury	22	4	5	13	40	67	−27	17	
11	Cambridge City (R)	22	2	3	17	25	71	−46	9	Relegation from the National League
12	Haywards Heath Town (R)	22	1	2	19	19	66	−47	5	Relegation from the National League

Updated to match(es) played on 5 May 2024. Source:
Rules for classification: 1) Points; 2) Goal difference; 3) Number of goals scored
(C) Champions; (P) Promoted; (R) Relegated

=== Division One South West ===
FA Women's National League Division One South West
- Season: 2023–24
- Champions: Exeter City
- Promoted: Exeter City
- Relegated: Torquay United; Selsey
- Matches: 132
- Goals: 668 (5.06 per match)
- Top goalscorer: Annabelle Colston (Swindon Town) (35 goals)
- Biggest home win: Swindon Town 28–0 Selsey (24 March 2024)
- Biggest away win: Selsey 0–15 Swindon Town (4 February 2024)
- Highest scoring: Swindon Town 28–0 Selsey (24 March 2024)

Changes from last season:

- Cardiff City Ladies were promoted to Southern Premier Division as Division One South West champions.
- Bridgwater United were relegated from Southern Premier Division.
- Torquay United were promoted from South West Regional Women's Football League as champions.
- Abingdon United were promoted from Southern Region Women's Football League as champions.
- Larkhall Athletic were relegated to South West Regional Women's Football League.
- AFC St Austell were relegated to South West Regional Women's Football League.

Club	Home ground	Position 2022–23
Abingdon United		SRWFL, 1st
AFC Bournemouth	Long Lane, Ringwood	4th
Bridgwater United	Fairfax Park, Bridgwater	WNL South, 11th
Exeter City	Exwick Sports Hub, Exeter	2nd
Keynsham Town	Crown Field, Keynsham	9th
Maidenhead United	York Road, Maidenhead	10th
Moneyfields	Moneyfields Sports Ground, Portsmouth	3rd
Portishead Town	Bristol Road, Portishead	7th
Selsey	The High Street Ground, Selsey	8th
Southampton Women's	Arlebury Park, New Alresford	5th
Swindon Town	Cinder Lane, Fairford	6th
Torquay United		SWRWFL, 1st

Location of Division One South West clubs for the 2023–24 season

==== League table ====
Pos	Team	Pld	W	D	L	GF	GA	GD	Pts	Qualification
1	Exeter City (C, P)	22	20	2	0	115	15	+100	62	Promotion to the Southern Premier Division
2	AFC Bournemouth	22	19	3	0	104	13	+91	60	
3	Moneyfields	22	14	3	5	92	32	+60	45	
4	Swindon Town	22	13	2	7	98	35	+63	41	
5	Abingdon United	22	11	2	9	41	38	+3	35	
6	Bridgwater United	22	10	2	10	39	41	−2	32	
7	Keynsham Town	22	9	4	9	45	44	+1	31	
8	Maidenhead United	22	9	3	10	43	49	−6	30	
9	Portishead Town	22	6	2	14	33	77	−44	20	
10	Southampton Women's	22	3	5	14	23	59	−36	14	
11	Torquay United (R)	22	3	2	17	32	67	−35	11	Relegation to the National League
12	Selsey (R)	22	0	0	22	3	198	−195	0	Relegation to the National League

Updated to match(es) played on 5 May 2024. Source:
Rules for classification: 1) Points; 2) Goal difference; 3) Number of goals scored
(C) Champions; (P) Promoted; (R) Relegated

== See also ==
- 2023–24 FA Women's National League Cup
- 2023–24 FA Women's National League Plate
- 2023–24 Women's Super League (tier 1)
- 2023–24 Women's Championship (tier 2)
