= Grace Donnelly =

English footballer (born 1998)

Personal information
- Full name: Grace Louise Donnelly
- Date of birth: 20 August 1998 (age 28)
- Place of birth: England
- Height: 1.66 m (5 ft 5 in)
- Position: Goalkeeper

Youth career
- –2017: Sunderland

Senior career*
Years	Team	Apps	(Gls)
2017–2025	Newcastle United	141	(0)
- * Club domestic league appearances and goals as of 20:39, 9 June 2025

Grace Donnelly (born 20 August 1998) is an English footballer who most recently played as a goalkeeper for Women's Championship club Newcastle United. She holds the record for making the most appearances for the club, 141 matches in total.

== Club career ==
=== Newcastle United ===
Donnelly signed for Newcastle United from the Sunderland Academy in July 2017. She made her debut on 20 August 2017 against Brighouse Town Ladies. Donnelly finished the 2017–18 season with 21 appearances for the club.

In the 2018–19 season she made 20 appearances for the club.

In March 2020 the club announced that the season had ended with immediate effect due to the outbreak of COVID-19, and she finished the 2019–20 season with 8 appearances.

Donnelly suffered an anterior cruciate ligament injury which kept her from playing for the 2020–21 season.

On 1 May 2022 she played in Newcastle United Women's first game at St James' Park against Alnwick Town, and finished the 2021–22 season having made 31 appearances.

In July 2022 Donnelly was named as the new club captain ahead of the 2022–23 season. She won the divisional golden glove award for the most clean sheets in the same season. In the 2022-23 season she made 28 appearances for the club.

Donnelly became a professional footballer when Newcastle United went full time ahead of the 2023–24 season. She won the divisional golden glove award for the second consecutive year. In the 2023–24 season she made 26 appearances for the club.

Newcastle United announced she would be leaving the club at the end of the 2024–25 season, and she played her last game for the club at Ewood Park against Blackburn Rovers.

== Personal life ==
Donnelly is in a relationship with former Newcastle United player Olivia Watt. The couple got engaged on 9 March 2026.

== Honors ==
=== Club ===
Newcastle United

- 2022–23 FA Women's National League Division One North
- 2022–23 FA Women's National League Division One North Golden Glove
- 2023–24 FA Women's National League Northern Division
- 2023–24 FA Women's National League Northern Division Golden Glove
