= 2022–23 FA Women's National League Plate =

WNL Plate

Tournament details
- Country: England
- Dates: 9 October 2022 – 26 March 2023
- Teams: 35

Final positions
- Champions: Leeds United (1st title)
- Runners-up: Stourbridge

Tournament statistics
- Matches played: 34
- Goals scored: 158 (4.65 per match)

The 2022–23 FA Women's National League Plate was the eighth season of the competition, open to those eliminated in the determining round of the WNL Cup.

Reigning champions Nottingham Forest won their determining round match this season, meaning that they did not defend their title. Leeds United beat Stourbridge 3–1 in the final to claim their first title.

== Results ==
All results listed are published by The Football Association. Games are listed by round in chronological order, and then in alphabetical order of the home team where matches were played simultaneously.

The division each team play in is indicated in brackets after their name: (S)=Southern Division; (N)=Northern Division; (SW1)=South West Division One; (SE1)=South East Division One; (M1)=Midlands Division One; (N1)=Northern Division One.

=== Preliminary round ===
| 9 October 2022 | Sheffield | 0–3 | Northampton Town | The Home of Football Stadium |
| 14:00 BST | | Report | Omenazu 12'; Dicks 52'; Farrow 81' | Attendance: 73 |

| 9 October 2022 | Moneyfields | 2–2 (a.e.t.) (2–3 p) | Portishead Town | Portsmouth |
| 14:00 BST | Fuller 41'; Berrow 50' | Report | Clark; Robbins | Stadium: Langstone Sports Site; Attendance: 50 |

| 9 October 2022 | Long Eaton United | 0–10 | Sporting Khalsa (M1) | Long Eaton |
| 14:00 BST | | Report | Garnham 29', 45+9', 72'; Weston 32', 40'; Gill-Parsons 52'; Woolston 63', 70', 88'; Craig-Tapper 77' | Stadium: Grange Park; Attendance: 55 |

=== First round ===
| 30 October 2022 | Sporting Khalsa (M1) | 1–5 | Boldmere St Michaels | Willenhall |
| 14:00 GMT | Austin-Short 11' | Report | Jefferies 23', 55', 80', 87'; Wilson 90' | Stadium: Guardian Warehousing Arena; Attendance: 40 |

| 30 October 2022 | Ladies | 1–2 | Swindon Town | Selsey |
| 14:00 GMT | Fox 88' | Report | Arnott 14'; Donnelly 90+10' | Stadium: High Street Ground; Attendance: 45 |

| 30 October 2022 | Norwich City | 1–4 | Crawley Wasps (S) | Norwich |
| 14:00 GMT | Cook | Report | Ajao; Buyukgiray; Talbut-Smith | Stadium: The Nest; Attendance: 177 |

| 30 October 2022 | Maidenhead United | 0–5 | Billericay Town (S1) | Maidenhead |
| 14:00 GMT | | Report | Jones; McLean; Rushen; Doo | Stadium: York Road; Attendance: 24 |

| 30 October 2022 | Leeds United (N1) | 3–1 | Solihull Moors | Tadcaster |
| 14:00 GMT | Brown 26'; Danby 56'; Smart 90' | Report | Hornsby | Stadium: Ings Lane; Attendance: 90 |

| 30 October 2022 | AFC Fylde | 2–1 | Doncaster Rovers Belles (M1) | Warton |
| 14:00 GMT | Carroll 38'; Forster 50' | Report | Tugby-Andrew | Stadium: Kellamergh Park |

| 30 October 2022 | Cheltenham Town (S) | 9–1 | AFC St Austell | Cirencester |
| 14:00 GMT | Butcher 4', 39', 64'; Newns 10'; Owen 29', 58', 68'; Nolan 52'; Grove 61' | Report | Solloway | Stadium: Cornium Stadium; Attendance: 72 |

| 30 October 2022 | Bradford City | 1–2 (a.e.t.) | Hull City (N1) | Bradford |
| 14:00 GMT | Stube | Report | Bartup 6'; Lynskey 107' | Stadium: Horsfall Stadium; Attendance: 50 |

| 30 October 2022 | Ashford Town | 1–0 | AFC Bournemouth | Robert Parker Stadium |
| 14:00 GMT | Whitelock 85' | Report | | Attendance: 65 |

| 30 October 2022 | Leek Town | 1–3 | West Bromwich Albion | Leek |
| 15:00 GMT | Pemberton 43' | Report | Mahmood; Stamps; Walklett | Stadium: The F Ball Community Stadium; Attendance: 41 |

| 6 November 2022 | Stourbridge | 2–1 (a.e.t.) | Leafield Athletic | Stourbridge |
| 14:00 GMT | Hazell 19'; Glover 117' | Report | Pagan 70' | Stadium: War Memorial Athletic Ground; Attendance: 176 |

| 6 November 2022 | Peterborough United | 5–0 | Wem Town | Bourne |
| 14:00 GMT | Stanford 42', 63'; Perkins 54', 76'; Kirk 82' | Report | | Stadium: Abbey Lawn; Attendance: 152 |

| 6 November 2022 | Northampton Town | 3–2 | Lincoln City | Northampton |
| 14:00 GMT | Dicks 23'; Artemiou 70'; Omenazu 78' | Report | Ringrose 65'; Farrow 75' | Stadium: Sixfields Stadium; Attendance: 1,011 |

| 6 November 2022 | Cambridge United | 4–0 | Cambridge City | St Neots |
| 14:00 GMT | Otten; Wiltshire; Fraser | Report | | Stadium: Rowley Park; Attendance: 105 |

| 4 December 2022 | Hounslow | 0–8 | Southampton (SW1) | Northolt |
| 14:00 GMT | | Report | Kilby 11'; Suominen 29', 47'; Tchuenkam 45+2', 89'; Sievwright 58'; Wylie 64'; May | Stadium: Rectory Park |

| 4 December 2022 | Queens Park Rangers | 3–2 | Portishead Town | Harlington |
| 14:00 GMT | Petit 28'; Cutler 46'; Wardlaw 70' | Report | Robbins 5'; Strippel 30' | Stadium: Harlington Sports Ground; Attendance: 52 |

=== Second round ===
| 4 December 2022 | Peterborough United | 0–4 | Stourbridge (M1) | Bourne |
| 13:00 GMT | | Report | Fishwick 17'; Nicklin 47', 50'; Scarlett 86' | Stadium: Abbey Lawn; Attendance: 152 |

| 4 December 2022 | AFC Fylde (N1) | 3–3 (a.e.t.) (4–3 p) | Boldmere St Michaels | Warton |
| 13:00 GMT | Hughes; McCoy | Report | Formaston; Greaves; George | Stadium: Kellamergh Park |

| 4 December 2022 | Northampton Town | 2–3 | Hull City (N1) | Northampton |
| 14:00 GMT | Farrow 12'; Artemiou 36' | Report | Bartup 52', 75'; Ackroyd 58' | Stadium: Kingsthorpe Mill; Attendance: 123 |

| 4 December 2022 | Leeds United (N1) | 2–1 | West Bromwich Albion | Tadcaster |
| 14:00 GMT | Ellis 48', 89' | Report | Mahmood | Stadium: Ings Lane; Attendance: 89 |

| 4 December 2022 | Cambridge United | 2–4 | Cheltenham Town (S) | St Neots |
| 14:00 GMT | Wiltshire | Report | Congrave 5'; Owen 43', 63'; Butcher 90' | Stadium: Rowley Park |

| 11 December 2022 | Crawley Wasps (S) | 2–0 | Ashford Town | Hop Oast Stadium |
| 14:00 GMT | Jones; Ajao | Report |

| 11 December 2022 | Billericay Town (S1) | 6–3 | Queens Park Rangers | New Lodge |
| 14:00 GMT | Jones; Parker; Rushen; Sealey | Report | Cutler; Hall; Jordinson |

| 8 January 2023 | Southampton (SW1) | 5–2 | Swindon Town | Southampton |
| 14:00 GMT | Cheshire; Jeal; May; Kingshott | Report | Colston 54'; Arnott 70' | Stadium: Redbridge Community School; Attendance: 60 |

=== Quarter-finals ===
| 22 January 2023 | Southampton (SW1) | 4–3 | Billericay Town (S1) | Southampton |
| 14:00 GMT | Okoro; Tucker | Report | Iton; Parker; Robins | Stadium: Redbridge Community School; Attendance: 30 |

| 22 January 2023 | Crawley Wasps (S) | 2–2 (a.e.t.) (5–4 p) | Cheltenham Town (S) | Horsham |
| 14:30 GMT | Buyukgiray | Report | News 30', 48' | Stadium: The Camping World Community Stadium |

| 29 January 2023 | Hull City (N1) | 1–2 | Stourbridge (M1) | Barton |
| 14:00 GMT | Bartup | Report | Nicklin 19'; Deasy 68' | Stadium: Marsh Lane; Attendance: 214 |

| 5 February 2023 | AFC Fylde (N1) | 0–2 | Leeds United (N1) | Warton |
| 14:00 GMT | | Report | Smith 50'; Brown 52' | Stadium: Kellamergh Park; Attendance: 68 |

=== Semi-finals ===
| 26 February 2023 | Leeds United (N1) | 2–0 | Southampton (SW1) | Tadcaster |
| 14:00 GMT | Woodruff 30', 88' | Report | | Stadium: Ings Lane; Attendance: 193 |

| 26 February 2023 | Stourbridge (M1) | 3–0 | Crawley Wasps (S) | Stourbridge |
| 14:00 GMT | Rogers 20'; Ireson-Lawrence 26'; Deasy 58' | Report | | Stadium: War Memorial Athletic Ground |

== Final ==
26 March 2023
15:30 GMT

| Leeds United (N1) | 3–1 | Stourbridge (M1) |
|---|---|---|
| Ellis 30'; Brown 63'; Woodruff 75' | Report | Fishwick 34' |

Armco Arena, Solihull
