= Plewa =

Plewa is a surname. Notable people with the surname include:

- Emma Plewa (born 1990), Welsh footballer
- John Plewa (1945–1995), American educator and politician
- Konrad Plewa (born 1992), Polish footballer
