= Stourbridge F.C. Women =

Women's association football club in England

Stourbridge
- Full name: Stourbridge Football Club Women
- Nickname(s): The Glassgirls
- Founded: 2012; 13 years ago
- Ground: War Memorial Athletic Ground, Amblecote
- Capacity: 2,626
- Chairman: Andy Pountney
- Manager: Megan Bailey
- League: FA Women's National League North
- 2024–25: FA Women's National League North, 12th of 12 (relegated)
- Website: http://www.stourbridgefc.com/
Home colours	Away colours

Stourbridge Football Club Women is an English women's football club based in the town of Stourbridge, West Midlands. Founded in 2012, they currently play in the FA Women's National League North.

== History ==
Stourbridge Football Club Ladies was formed in 2012. Andy Fisher was announced as new manager on 19 June 2016. The club won the 2021–22 West Midlands Regional Women's Premier Division, and were promoted to the FA Women's National League Division One Midlands; the club was subsequently renamed Stourbridge F.C. Women ahead of the 2022-23 season. Stourbridge won the 2022–23 Midlands Division One, and were promoted to the Northern Premier Division. The club also reached the final of the 2022–23 FA Women's National League Plate, losing 3–1 to Leeds United.

== Management team ==
As of 5 October 2025

Position	Staff
Manager	(England) Megan Bailey
Assistant manager	(England) Tash Tezgel
First team coach	(England) Dave Healey
Goalkeeping coach	(England) Lucas Bard

=== Managerial history ===
Dates	Name
2012–2016	(England) Keith Merrick
2016–2023	(England) Andy Fisher
2023–2025	(England) Mike Harris
2025–	(England) Megan Bailey

== Honours ==
=== League ===
- FA Women's National League Division One Midlands
  - Winners (1): 2022–23
- West Midlands Regional Women's Premier Division
  - Winners (1): 2021–22
