= Exeter City W.F.C. =

- Full name: Exeter City Women Football Club
- Nickname: The Grecians
- Founded: 1997; 29 years ago as Elmore Eagles L.F.C.
- Ground: St James Park, Exeter; Coach Road, Newton Abbot; Silver Street, Willand
- Chairman: Julen Beer Ayo
- Manager: Abbie Britton
- League: FA Women's National League South
- 2025–26: FA Women's National League South, 7th of 12
- Website: exetercityfc.co.uk/women
Home colours	Away colours

Exeter City Women Football Club is an English women's football club, based in Exeter. They are currently members of the FA Women's National League South.

== History ==
=== Elmore Eagles L.F.C. ===
The team was originally formed around 1997 when they were named Elmore Eagles L.F.C.

=== Exeter City Ladies Football Club ===
In 2001, the Elmore Eagles joined forces with Exeter City and the Exeter City Ladies Football Club was formed.

=== Exeter City Centre Of Excellence (COE) Ladies ===
In 2006, the club controversially changed their name to Cullompton Rangers L.F.C. Many were keen to keep the 'Exeter City Ladies' name, and in the summer of 2006, Exeter City COE Ladies was formed, entering the Devon Women's Division 2.

The team won all but 1 game in the league that season and were promoted. The team also won the League Cup. However, they were stripped of the honour after investigations were made at the beginning of the 2007/2008 and it was proven that 'illegally' signed players had played in the cup games.

Following a number of departures at the end of the 2015–16 season, Exeter City Ladies Football Club were heading towards disbandment. However, due to strong links with local schools and the Community Trust the club was kept running and continued to play in the FA Women's Premier League South West Division One.

=== Exeter City Women ===
At the end of the 2018–19 season the club changed their name to Exeter City Women in preparation for the campaign in the FA Women's National League Division One South West.

The team were crowned champions of the South West Women's Premier Division following a 3–1 victory over Keynsham Town Ladies at the end of the 2018-19 season.

The club continued with their progression in the fourth tier of Women’s football, renamed the Women’s FA National League Division One South West, finishing third and second in the 2021-22 and 2022-23 seasons respectively.

The team secured promotion to the third tier for the first-time at the end of the 2023–24 campaign after seeing off fellow title contenders AFC Bournemouth in the final game of the season with a 1–1 home draw. Exeter City also finished the season unbeaten, only dropping four points from 66 available (both games drawn were against AFC Bournemouth). Promotion to the third tier of English women's football saw the club depart Exwick Sports Hub and instead secure Coach Road in Newton Abbot as their secondary home venue alongside matches at St James Park. Prior to the start of the 2026–27 season, the club stated their main objective is to stage all home matches within the city boundaries, but St James Park is the only stadium in Exeter that meets third-tier venue requirements and cannot host all team home matches. Therefore, six matches will be held at St James Park, double the previous season, while five would be held at Coach Road and two at Silver Street of Willand Rovers.

== Players ==
=== First-team squad ===
As of 20 September 2026

Note: Flags indicate national team as defined under FIFA eligibility rules; some limited exceptions apply. Players may hold more than one non-FIFA nationality.

No.	Pos.	Nation	Player
1	GK	ENG	Tyrii Bell
2	DF	ENG	Bow Jackson (captain)
3	MF	ENG	Tia Asker
4	MF	ENG	Emily Poole
5	DF	ENG	Saskia Heard
6	DF	ENG	Jess Sandland
7	FW	ENG	Georgia Vaccaro
8	MF	ENG	Fearne Slocombe
9	FW	ENG	Ellie Sara
10	MF	ENG	Ishbel Zuurmond
11	DF	ENG	Maya Kendell
13	DF	WAL	Ffion Llewellyn

No.	Pos.	Nation	Player
14	MF	WAL	Bethan McGowan
16	MF	ENG	Phoebe Baker
17	FW	ENG	Emily Pitman
18	MF	WAL	Nia Lewis (on loan from Bristol City)
19	FW	ENG	Charlotte Whitmore
21	MF	ENG	Darcey Maxted
22	DF	GRE	Giota Papaioannou
23	MF	ENG	Amber Pollock
24	GK	ENG	Amy Lockyer
25	GK	ENG	Erin Foley
26	MF	ENG	Lauren Le Poidevin
31	GK	ENG	Carly Kelland

== Management ==
=== Current management and coaching staff ===
As of August 2026

Name	Role
Abbie Britton	Manager

== Honours ==
=== League honours ===
- FA Women's National League Division One South West
  - Champions (1): 2023–24
- FA South West Women's Premier Division
  - Champions (1): 2018–19
- FA Women's Premier League South West Division One
  - Runners-up (1): 2014–15
- South West Combination League
  - Runners-up (1): 2013–14
- South West Women's Football League: Premier Division
  - Champions (2): 2001–02, (Note: As Exeter City LFC) 2011-12
  - Runners-up (1): 1999–00 (Note: As Elmore Eagles LFC)
- South West Women's Football League: Division One West
  - Runners-up (1): 2010–11
- Westward Developments Premier League
  - Promoted (1): 2009–10
- Westward Developments Division One
  - Promoted (1): 2008–09
- Westward Developments Division Two
  - Promoted (1): 2006–07

=== Cups and Trophies ===
- Devon Women's Premier Cup
  - Winners (2): 2022–23, 2023–24
- Devon County Women's Senior Cup
  - Winners (1): 2012–13
  - Runners-up (2): 2010–11, 2011–12 2013–14
- Devon Women's League Cup
  - Winners (1): 2007 (Note: As Exeter City Centre of Excellence (COE) Ladies)
- Devon Cup
  - Winners (2): 1998, 1999
- Pat Sowden Cup
  - Winners (2): 1998, 2002
- Bristol Soccerworld Cup
  - Winners (1): 2010–11
