= Emma Plewa =

Welsh footballer (born 1990)

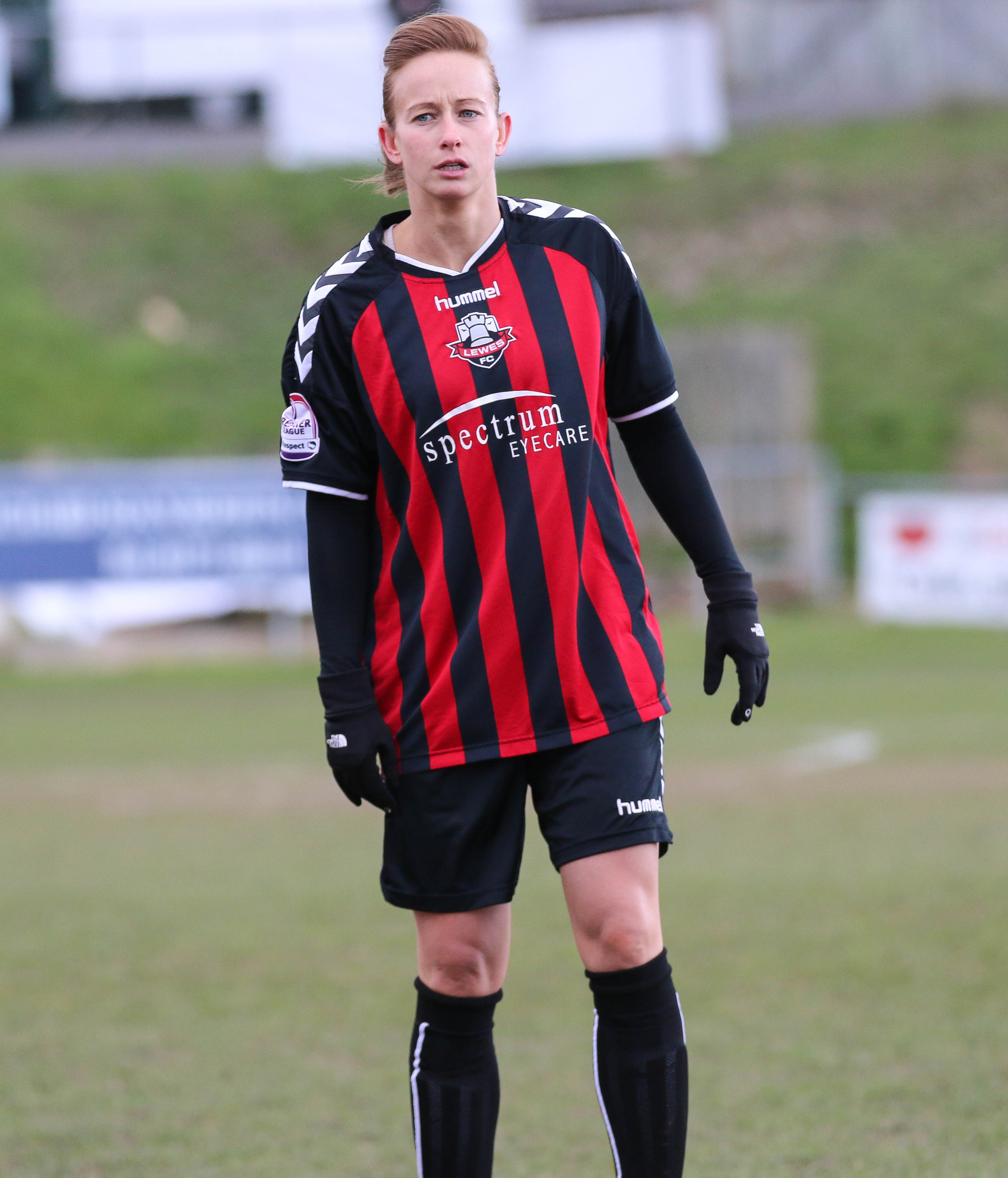
- Plewa with Lewes in 2016

Personal information
- Full name: Emma Jane Plewa
- Date of birth: 8 September 1990 (age 36)
- Place of birth: Brecon, Wales
- Height: 5 ft 6 in (1.68 m)
- Position: Forward

Team information
- Current team: Crawley Wasps

Youth career
- Filton College Football Academy

Senior career*
Years	Team	Apps	(Gls)
2008–2009	Bristol Academy		
2009	Lee University		
2009–2010	Bristol Academy		
2010–2013	Chelsea Ladies	9	(1)
2011–2012	→ Tottenham Hotspur (loan)		
2014	Millwall Lionesses		
2015–2016	Lewes		
2018–	Crawley Wasps	20	(12)
2021	→ Charlton Athletic (loan)	5	(0)
2022–	Wimbledon	18	(9)

International career^{‡}
	Wales U19	7	(5)
2008–	Wales	20	(1)
- * Club domestic league appearances and goals as of 03:08, 11 October 2023 (UTC) ‡ National team caps and goals as of 17 April 2011

Emma Jane Plewa (born 8 September 1990) is a footballer who plays for the Welsh national team and Wimbledon. Plewa plays as a winger or forward.

== Club career ==
Plewa was a regular in the Bristol Academy's (Filton) college team which won three national titles in 2008–09. In November 2008 she scored on her debut for the senior Academy team, in a 2–2 draw at Blackburn Rovers.

Plewa played for Lee University in 2009, but returned to Bristol Academy to finish season 2009–10. She signed for Chelsea in summer 2010. In April 2011 Plewa scored her first goal for Chelsea in a 4–1 win at Doncaster Rovers Belles. She signed for Tottenham Hotspur Ladies in autumn 2011.

After some time away from football, Plewa signed for plucky part-timers Crawley Wasps in 2018. In December 2018 she was named Player of the 1st Round in the Women's FA Cup.

Plewa signed with AFC Wimbledon in July 2022.

== International career ==
Plewa won seven caps and scored five goals for the Wales U19s. She made her senior debut in a 2–1 friendly defeat by Finland in November 2008.
