= Selsey F.C. Women =

Women's association football club in England

Coordinates: 50°44′02.35″N 0°47′35.88″W

Selsey Football Club
- Full name: Selsey Women Football Club
- Founded: May 2020; 4 years ago
- Ground: High Street Ground, Selsey
- League: Southern Region Women's Football League
- 2023–24: FA Women's National League Division One South West, 12th of 12 (relegated)
- Website: https://www.pitchero.com/clubs/chichesterladiesfc/

Selsey Women Football Club (formerly Chichester and Selsey Ladies and Youth Football Club) are a women's association football club based in Selsey, West Sussex, England. They were founded in 2020 as a breakaway club from Chichester City F.C. and were renamed Selsey for the 2023—24 season. They play in the FA Women's National League South West.

== History ==
Historically, the club were Chichester City L.F.C., which had been founded in 2012 and affiliated to the men's Chichester City F.C. However, in 2019 they moved their home matches from Chichester City's Oaklands Park in Chichester to Selsey F.C.'s High Street Ground due to feeling they were unable to get all women's and girl's teams training together at Oaklands Park. Selsey F.C. invited the team to move there to play their remaining matches. In May 2020, for an undisclosed reason, the women's team formally broke away from Chichester City F.C. and moved to Selsey permanently. Chichester City then set up a new women's team called Chichester City Women and aimed to re-enter the FA women's national pyramid.

To avoid confusion between the similar names of two clubs, which occurred due to mistaken reports that the team were moving back to Oaklands Park, the former Chichester City Ladies renamed themselves to Chichester & Selsey Ladies. Chichester & Selsey would retain the former affiliation's colours of green and white as well as their position in the FA Women's National League Southern Premier Division. They were scheduled to play their first Women's FA Cup match under their new name in January 2021 but this was delayed due to the COVID-19 pandemic in the United Kingdom.
