= Haywards Heath Town F.C. Women =

Coordinates: 51°02′49.00″N 0°20′26.60″W

Haywards Heath Town FC
- Full name: Haywards Heath Town Women FC
- Nickname(s): The Blues (formerly the Wasps)
- Founded: 1991; 34 years ago, as Crawley Wasps
- Ground: Hanbury Park Stadium Haywards Heath
- Chairman: Steve Isherwood
- Manager: Ross Pizzey
- League: London and South East Women's Regional Football League
- 2023–24: FA Women's National League Division One South East, 12th of 12 (relegated)
- Website: https://hhtfc.co.uk/squad/womens-squad/
| Home colours | Away colours |

Haywards Heath Town F.C. Women (formerly Crawley Wasps Ladies FC) is an English women's football club, that currently plays in the FA Women's National League South East. Until 2023 the club played at The Camping World Community Stadium, home of Horsham FC. In 2023 Wasps merged with Haywards Heath Town F.C. and will play matches from 2023—24 at Haywards Heath's Hanbury Park. In May 2023 it was announced that Crawley Wasps would change their name to Haywards Heath Women.

== History ==
Founded in 1991, Crawley Wasps have been instrumental in the successful development of girls' football in the Crawley area. From the early days of playing seven-a-side in various Surrey leagues, the club have expanded to more than 100 playing members in teams at all levels from Under-11s to three Ladies sides.

Wasps helped pioneer the development of ladies and girls' football in Sussex, becoming a founding member of the Sussex County Women and Girls' Football League in 2002–03.

Between May 2013 and May 2018, as they progressed from Under-11s to Under-16s, one Wasps team lost just three of 70 matches against girls teams – their dominance was such that they tested themselves in a boys' league in 2016–17.

The club celebrated its 25th anniversary season, in 2016–17, in style on and off the pitch. Thales, one of Crawley's largest employers, became Wasps' first-ever main club sponsor, while the Ladies' first team reached the Sussex Cup final and also the League Cup final.

In 2017–18, Wasps' first team earned a historic promotion to the FA Women's National League South, going unbeaten as they won the London & South East Premier Division, while again reaching the Sussex Cup and League Cup finals.

The 2018-19 was unquestionably the most successful in the club's history. The first team won the FA Women's National League Division 1 South East (securing back-to-back promotions), reached the League Cup final and played Arsenal in front of 1,550 people in the fourth round of the Women's FA Cup. The reserves and Under-18s also won their respective league titles.

Wasps first team then led the FA Women's National League South for much of the following season, which was curtailed due to the Coronavirus pandemic. They did win the Sussex Women's Challenge Cup for the first time, beating Chichester on penalties. The club's reserves performed well in their debut season in the FA Women's National League Reserve Section, and the youth sectioned swelled to over 100 players.

In the summer of 2020, Paul Walker, first-team manager since 2015 and chairman since 2017, parted company with the club. Jack Ayles took over as chairman and Dave Cole as manager.

== Players ==
=== First-team squad ===
Note: Flags indicate national team as defined under FIFA eligibility rules; some limited exceptions apply. Players may hold more than one non-FIFA nationality.

| No. | Pos. | Nation | Player |
|---|---|---|---|
| 2 | MF | (England) ENG | Holly Talbut-Smith |
| 3 | DF | (England) ENG | Rachel Palmer (vice-captain) |
| 4 | MF | (England) ENG | Kate McIntyre |
| 5 | DF | (England) ENG | Darcey James |
| 6 | DF | (England) ENG | Ellie Russell |
| 8 | FW | (England) ENG | Skye Bacon |
| 9 | FW | (England) ENG | Magda Mosengo |
| 10 | MF | (England) ENG | Charlotte Owen |
| 11 | MF | (England) ENG | Tash Stephens |
| 13 | GK | (England) ENG | Megen Lynch |

| No. | Pos. | Nation | Player |
|---|---|---|---|
| 15 | MF | (Wales) WAL | Immy Lancaster |
| 17 | MF | (England) ENG | Naomi Cole (captain) |
| 18 | MF | Isle of Man | Sarah Wignall |
| 20 | DF | (England) ENG | Madi Hook (dual registration with Brighton) |
| 21 | MF | (England) ENG | Flo Jackson |
| 22 | DF | (England) ENG | Hope Nash |
| 30 | FW | (England) ENG | Nikita Whinnett |
| - | FW | (England) ENG | Iesha Swaby (dual registration with Brighton) |
| - | FW | (England) ENG | Jo Wilson |
| — | FW | (Wales) WAL | Emma Plewa |

==== Out on loan ====
Note: Flags indicate national team as defined under FIFA eligibility rules; some limited exceptions apply. Players may hold more than one non-FIFA nationality.

| No. | Pos. | Nation | Player |
|---|---|---|---|
| 7 | MF | (Wales) WAL | Emma Plewa (at Charlton) |

=== Reserves & Development squad ===
Note: Flags indicate national team as defined under FIFA eligibility rules; some limited exceptions apply. Players may hold more than one non-FIFA nationality.

| No. | Pos. | Nation | Player |
|---|---|---|---|
| 23 | MF | | Amy Green |
| 24 | MF | | Lottie Turner |
| 25 | GK | | Lauren Graves |
| 27 | DF | | Chanelle Gainsford |
| 33 | MF | | Jade Simmons |
| 42 | FW | | Ami Martins |
