= South West Regional Women's Football League =

South West Women's Football League
- Founded: 1974
- Country: England
- Divisions: 4
- Number of clubs: 36
- Level on pyramid: 5 & 6
- Feeder to: FA Women's National League Division 1 South West

The South West Women's Football League is at the fifth and sixth levels of the English women's football pyramid, with the seven other Regional Leagues – Eastern, London & SE, Southern, West Mids, East Mids, North East and North West. The South West Regional Women's Football League feeds directly into the FA Women's National League Division 1 South West, and lies above the Cornwall Women's Football League, Devon Women's Football League, Dorset Women's Football League, Gloucestershire County Women's Football League, Wiltshire FA Women's Football League and Somerset Women's Football League in the pyramid. The pyramid structure was founded in 1998.

Below the Premier Division the two Division Ones are split geographically with Division One East and Division One West.

Exeter City Ladies were crowned the 2018-19 champions of the Premier League following a 3-1 win over Keynsham Town Development on the 15th of April 2019.

Lakeside Athletic Ladies were promoted from the Devon Women’s League as runners up in 2018/19.

== 2021–22 Season ==
The premier division was won by AFC St Austell Ladies 1st who finished on 45 points with a record of 14-3-1. Their promotion means they will be playing in the FA Women's National League South.

The northern division was won by Bristol Rovers Women First who finished on 43 points with a record of 14-1-1. They have gained promotion to the Premier Division.

The western division was won by Liskeard Athletic Women FC First who are currently top of the league with one game to play. Their record is currently 10-2-2 and they have 32 points.

The eastern division was won by Warminster Town Ladies who are top of the league with one game to play. Their record stands currently at 13-2-2 as they top the league on 41 points.

== Teams ==
The teams competing in the league for the 2024–25 season are:

=== Premier Division ===
Club	Home ground	Capacity
AEK Boco Ladies	Greenbank Road	1,000
AFC St Austell Women	Poltair Park	6,000
Bishops Lydeard Ladies	Darby Way	1,000
Forest Green Rovers Women	Chalford Sports & Social Club	1,000
Frampton Rangers Ladies	Lodge Road	2,000
Ilminster Town Ladies	Brittens Field	1,000
Marine Academy Plymouth Ladies	Marine Academy Plymouth	
Poole Town Ladies	Dorset County Ground	1,000
Pucklechurch Sports Ladies	Recreation Ground, Pucklechurch	1,000
Sherborne Town Ladies	Raleigh Grove	1,150
Torquay United Women	Coach Road	1,000

Location of the SWRWFL Premier Division clubs for the 2024–25 season

=== Northern Division ===
Club	Home ground	Capacity
Bath City Women	Twerton Park	8,800
Bitton Ladies	Recreation Ground, Bitton	1,500
Cirencester Town Ladies	Corinium Stadium	4,500
Corsham Town Ladies	Southbank	1,200
Downend Flyers Women	The Playing Fields	1,500
Gloucester City Women	Meadow Park	4,000
Paulton Rovers Ladies	Winterfield Road	2,500
Purton Women	The Redhouse	1,000
Royal Wootton Bassett Town Ladies	New Gerard Buxton Sports Ground	4,500
SGS Olveston United Women	Stoke Gifford Stadium	1,500
St Vallier Ladies	Lockleaze Sports Centre 4G	1,000
Stockwood Wanderers Women	Stockwood Lane	

Location of the SWRWFL Northern Division clubs for the 2024–25 season
Location of the SWRWFL Northern Division clubs for the 2024–25 season

=== Southern Division ===
Club	Home ground	Capacity
Bideford Women	Kingsley Road	6,000
Feniton Women	Station Road	1,000
Helston Athletic Women	Kellaway Park	3,000
Honiton Town Women	Mountbatten Park	800
Plympton Ladies	Bull Point	
Saltash United Women	Kimberley Stadium	1,000
Sticker Women	Burngullow Park	2,000
Weston-super-Mare Women	Optima Stadium 3G	
Weymouth Women	Bob Lucas Stadium	6,600
Yeovil Town Women	Alvington Playing Fields	1,000

Location of the SWRWFL Southern Division clubs for the 2024–25 season
