= Sporting Khalsa F.C. Women =

Women's football club

Sporting Khalsa
- Full name: Sporting Khalsa Football Club Women
- Nickname: Sporting
- Founded: 2015
- Ground: Aspray Arena, Noose Lane, Willenhall
- Manager: Juan Dopazo
- League: FA Women's National League North
- 2024–25: FA Women's National League North, 10th of 12
Home colours

Sporting Khalsa Football Club Women are a football club, established in 2015, who play in the FA Women's National League North. Alongside their men's side, Sporting Khalsa, the club play their home games at the Aspray Arena in Willenhall, West Midlands.

== History ==
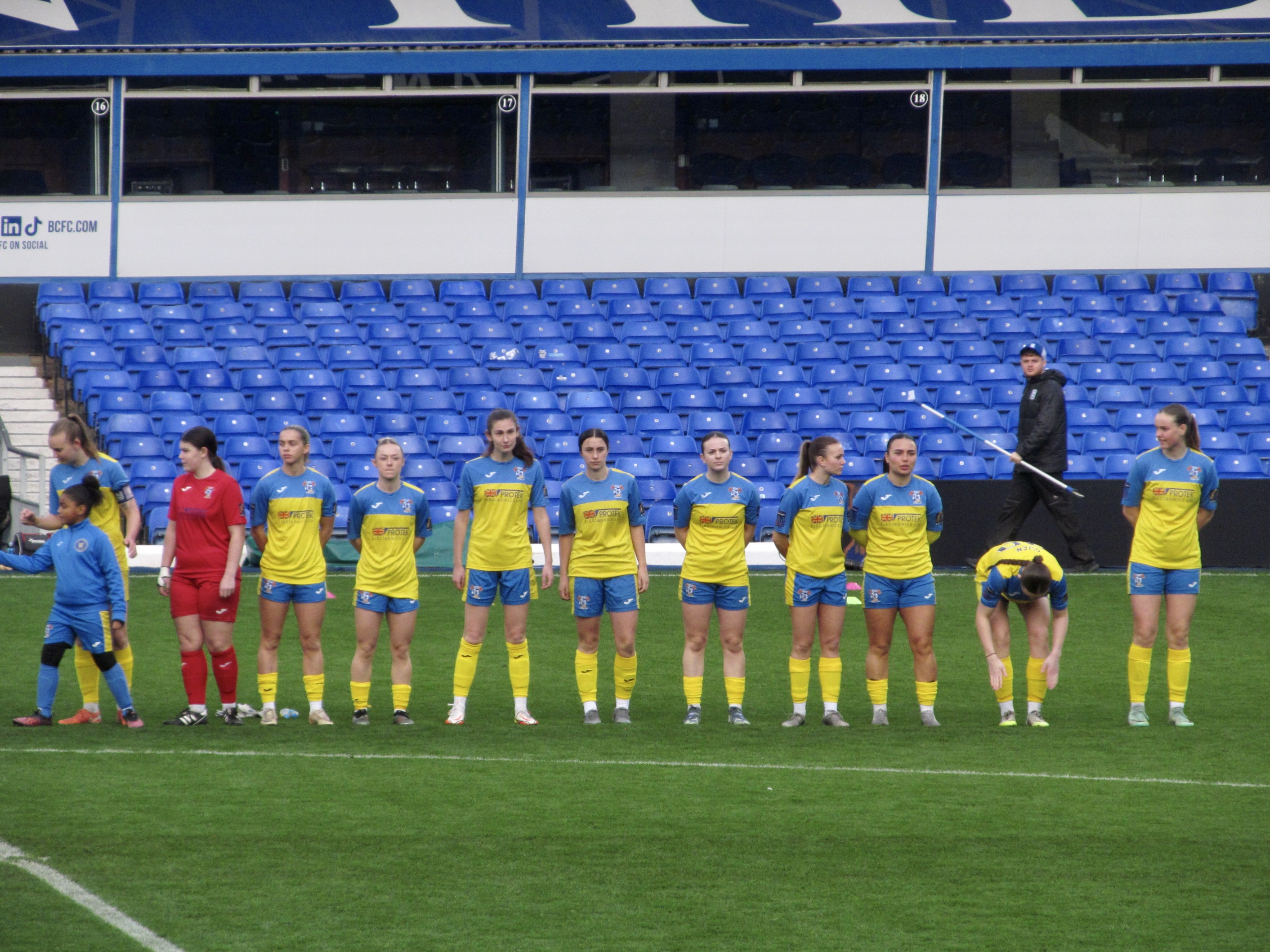
Sporting Khalsa F.C. Women line up before their 2025–26 FA Cup tie with Birmingham City Women, Knighthead Park @ St Andrews, 14 December 2025

Sporting Khalsa are the byproduct of a merger with the now defunct F.C. Reedswood which took place in 2015.

Sporting were promoted to the Northern Premier Division of the FA Women's National League for the 2024–25 season after winning the FA Women's National League Division One Midland in their final league game against Sheffield F.C.

== Current squad ==
As of 11 July 2025.

Note: Flags indicate national team as defined under FIFA eligibility rules; some limited exceptions apply. Players may hold more than one non-FIFA nationality.

No.	Pos.	Nation	Player
—			Lauren Bannister
—			Jessica Bate
—			Brittany Civil
—			Chloe Coldicott
—			Georgia Cox
—			Holly Cox
—			Gurjit Dulay
—			Chloe Evans
—			Amy Farmer
—			Beth Gallagher
—			Stacey Garnham
—			Rebecca Gill-Parsons
—			Ashpreet Gill
—			Lyndsey Glover
—			Rebbecca Green
—			Chloe Handy
—			Leanne Hickman
—			Gemma James
—			Paige Kavanagh

No.	Pos.	Nation	Player
—			Jess Keeling
—			Rebecca Knight
—			Stephanie Kydd
—			Melody Lewis
—			Ashleigh Miles
—			Brittney Mills
—			Angie Morley
—			Natalie Morris
—			Donna Mulligan
—			Laura Quigley
—			Jade Salisman
—			Julie Stirrup
—			Keeley Wakelam
—			Ellie Walker
—			Lauren Walker
—			Toni Whale
—			Kiera Willdigg
—			Kelly Williams
—			Bethan Woolley

== Honours ==
League

- FA National League Division One Midlands (level 3)
  - Champions: 2023–24
