= Halifax F.C. Women =

Coordinates: 53°43′10.891″N 1°48′0.691″W

Halifax Women
- Full name: Halifax Football Club Women
- Nickname: The Eagles
- Founded: 2013; 13 years ago
- Ground: Myra Shay
- Capacity: 200
- Manager: Rob Mitchell
- League: FA Women's National League Division One North
- 2025–26: FA Women's National League North, 11th of 12 (relegated)
- Website: https://halifaxfcwomen.co.uk/
Home colours	Away colours

Halifax Football Club Women is an English women's football club based in West Yorkshire. Formed in 2013, they currently play in the FA Women's National League Division One North, with home games at Myra Shay, Bradford.

== History ==
=== Brighouse Town (2013–2023) ===
Brighouse Town A.F.C. Women was formed in 2013. The club won the 2013–14 North East Regional Southern Division, and were promoted to the Premier Division. A second promotion was achieved in 2016, when the club won the 2015–16 North East Regional Premier Division, and were promoted to the FA Women's National League Division One North. Following an application for promotion, Brighouse were promoted to the FA Women's National League Northern Division for the 2021–22 season.

=== Halifax (2023–present) ===
In May 2023, following a split away from Brighouse Town, the club rebranded as Halifax F.C. Women. The club's first match following the rebrand was a 6–1 win against FC United of Manchester in the 2023–24 FA National League Cup, on 27 August 2023.

== Kits ==
=== Kit suppliers and shirt sponsors ===
Period	Kit manufacturer	Home sponsor	Away sponsor
2024–	Avec	Rapid Fitness 26	Kipmate

== Players ==
=== Current squad ===
As of 2025/26.

Note: Flags indicate national team as defined under FIFA eligibility rules; some limited exceptions apply. Players may hold more than one non-FIFA nationality.

No.	Pos.	Nation	Player
—	GK	ENG	Lily Groves
—	DF	ENG	Phoebe Hollin
—	DF	ENG	Anna Phillips
—	DF	IRL	Alix Mendez
—	DF	ENG	Annabelle Cass
—	DF	ENG	Ellie Dobson
—	DF	ENG	Maddie Robinson (on loan from Burnley)
—	MF	ENG	Summer Horner
—	MF	ENG	Emma Doyle (on loan from Burnley)

No.	Pos.	Nation	Player
—	MF	ENG	Ainsley Strickland
—	MF	ENG	Danielle Whitham
—	MF	WAL	Quianna Wheeler
—	MF	ENG	Emily Burke
—	MF	ENG	Meg Shaw
—	MF	ENG	Dolcie O'Connor
—	FW	ENG	Farah Crompton
—	FW	ENG	Eleanor Ashton
—	FW	ENG	Bonnie Davies
14	FW	ENG	Neve Renwick

=== Reserves ===
Halifax operate a reserve team who play in the FA Women's National League Reserve Northern Division.

== Management and staff ==
As of 24 January 2024.

Position	Name
First team manager	Robs Players Mitchell
Assistant / Fitness coach	Kevin Heetun
Assistant / Goalkeeping coach	Lee Harrison
Sports therapist	Connor Kavanagh
Reserves coach	Jonny Kilroy
U10 coach	Kayleigh Bamforth

== Honours ==
League

- North East Regional Premier Division (level 5)
  - Champions: 2015–16
- North East Regional Southern Division (level 6)
  - Champions: 2013–14
