= Hull City Ladies F.C. =

Women's association football club in England

Hull City Ladies
- Full name: Hull City Ladies Football Club
- Nickname: The Tigresses
- Founded: 2001; 25 years ago
- Ground: Easy Buy Stadium
- Coordinates: 53°43′02.42″N 0°30′00.61″W
- Chairman: Rachel Gay
- Manager: Adrian Costello
- League: FA Women's National League North
- 2025–26: FA Women's National League North, 9th of 12
- Website: www.hullcityladies.com
Home colours	Away colours

Hull City Ladies Football Club is a semi-professional women's association football club based in Kingston upon Hull, East Riding of Yorkshire, England. They compete in the FA Women's National League North, the third tier of the women's English football league system. They play their home games at the Easy Buy Stadium, in nearby Barton-upon-Humber, Lincolnshire.

Although they share a number of similarities with Hull City Association Football Club, the Tigresses, as they are known, are not affiliated with them and are completely independent.

== History ==
Hull City Ladies F.C. were formed in 2001, and began play in the Yorkshire & Humberside league before being promoted to the North East Women's Premier League in 2004–05. In the 2006–07 season, they were division champions and as a result achieved promotion to the Northern Combination Women's Football League. By 2009, they had been relegated back to the North East league. Ahead of the 2011–12 campaign, the club merged with Beverley Town Ladies. In 2014–15, the Tigresses were promoted as champions to the Women's Premier League Northern Division One. Their dramatic rise through the leagues continued, reaching the FA Women's National League North in 2018. However, in the 2021–22 season, they were relegated, only to return in 2024, after a 5–1 away victory over Leeds United saw Hull win the league title.

In April 2025, three major headlines broke from the club. Firstly, on 16 April, co-owner and chairman Daniel Johnson requested that the FA should relegate Hull to the fourth tier regardless of their league position amidst financial ruin. A few weeks later they were then investigated by the police for suspected fraud, with the club's future hanging in the balance. Then, on 30 April, the club's players accused Johnson of "aggressive behaviour", including making "inappropriate comments about sex".

== Players ==
=== Current squad ===
As of 18 August 2024.

Note: Flags indicate national team as defined under FIFA eligibility rules; some limited exceptions apply. Players may hold more than one non-FIFA nationality.

No.	Pos.	Nation	Player
1	GK	ENG	Abi Wallace
2	DF	ENG	Catherine Hamill
3	DF	ENG	Jo Symington
4	DF	ENG	Amy Wilson
5	DF	ENG	Ellice Jackman
6	DF	ENG	Tilly Oxley
7	MF	ENG	Liberty Bott
8	MF	ENG	Ellie Tanser
9	MF	ENG	Sophie Tinson
10	FW	ENG	Rachael Ackroyd
12	MF	ENG	Kirstie Hunt

No.	Pos.	Nation	Player
13	GK	ENG	Georgia Wattam
18	MF	ENG	Chloe Copsey
22	DF	ENG	Darcie Sugden-Brook
24	FW	ENG	Hope Knight
25	FW	ENG	Lily Cockerill
31	DF	ENG	Anna Bruton

- Robert Zand – Assistant Manager, GK Coach
- Joel Drewery – First Team Coach
- Zach Taylor - Kitman, Stadium Announcer

== Sponsors ==
Hull City Ladies has a long-standing relationship with local business, Wolds Engineering Services.
