= Queens Park Rangers F.C. Women =

Women's football club in London, England

Queens Park Rangers
- Full name: Queens Park Rangers Football Club Women
- Nicknames: The Hoops, The Rs, The Rangers, The Super Hoops
- Founded: 2019; 7 years ago
- Ground: Skyex Community Stadium
- Capacity: 3,000
- Head coach: Ross Bennett
- League: FA Women's National League Division One South East
- 2025–26: FA Women's National League Division One South East, 6th of 12
- Website: https://www.qpr.co.uk/category/women
Home colours	Away colours	Third colours

Queens Park Rangers Football Club Women, commonly abbreviated to QPR Women, is an English professional women's football club based in Hayes, London, England. The club plays in the Division One South East, the fourth tier of English women's football.

== History ==
Queens Park Rangers Women was formed in 2019, following the decision to create a new team operating under the club's Community Trust. The independent club of the same name continued to operate as Hounslow Women.

QPR were placed in the fifth tier London and South East Regional League for their inaugural 2019–20 season. Steve Quashie was announced as manager on 31 July 2019. The club won the 2020–21 Capital Senior Cup, defeating Actonians 4–3 on penalties in the final.

After both seasons were curtailed due to the COVID-19 pandemic, the club successfully applied for promotion to the fourth tier FA National League Division One South East.

== Players ==
=== First-team squad ===
As of 25 August 2026

Note: Flags indicate national team as defined under FIFA eligibility rules; some limited exceptions apply. Players may hold more than one non-FIFA nationality.

No.	Pos.	Nation	Player
1	GK	TTO	Simone Eligon
2	DF	ENG	Nicole Barrett
3	DF	ENG	Ellie Searle
5	DF	ENG	Jazz Younger
6	DF	ENG	Georgie Lewin
7	MF	ENG	Anna Dyzadyk
8	MF	ENG	Emily Hill (captain)
9	FW	ENG	Shannon Albuery
10	FW	ENG	Taylor Bell
11	MF	ENG	Fern Orchard

No.	Pos.	Nation	Player
12	FW	ENG	Jessica Leach
13	GK	ENG	Holly McLoughlin
14	DF	ENG	Renee Johnson
15	DF	AUS	Halle Carn
16	FW	ENG	Emily Donovan
19	MF	ENG	Izzy Owen
21	MF	ENG	Chloe Sampson
22	MF	ENG	Deja Bass
23	MF	ENG	Ava Lee-Walsh
28	FW	ENG	Lauren Amerena

== Club management ==
=== Managerial history ===
Dates	Name
2019–2024	(England) Steve Quashie
2024–2026	(England) Danny Harrigan
2026-	(England) Karl Watson

== Honours ==
Cup

- Capital Senior Cup
  - Winners: 2020–21
