= Lincoln City Women F.C. =

Lincoln Women FC
- Full name: Lincoln Women FC
- Founded: 2008 (as Nettleham Ladies)
- Ground: Ashby Avenue, Lincoln
- Manager: Tom Padden
- League: East Midlands Regional Women's Football League Premier Division
- 2024–25: FA Women's National League Division One Midlands, 12th of 12 (relegated)
- Website: www.lincolnwomenfootball.com
Home colours

Lincoln Women is an English women's football team affiliated with Lincoln City FC and Lincoln United FC. The club play in the East Midlands Premier Division.

== History ==
Lincoln Women FC has evolved over the period of time since the club's inception in 2008. They started life as Nettleham Ladies FC and entered the Lincolnshire County Women's League in the same year. In 2009, the club won the Lincolnshire County Women's League and were promoted to East Midlands Women's Football League Division One North, where they remained until 2012.

For the start of 2012–13 season they gained promotion as league champions and were promoted to the East Midlands Women's Football League Premier Division, where they competed until 2017–18 season. They clinched the title by three points, losing just one game all season. The season ended with a 7–0 victory over Grimsby Borough in the County Cup Final.

Another title winning season was followed by their first season at Tier Four of the women's football pyramid in 2018/19 and they have continued to dominate the Lincolnshire Women's Senior County Cup by winning it in each of the last six seasons.

The summer of 2019 was a landmark in the development of the club as a successful name change to Lincoln City Women FC meant a total rebranding for the 2019–20 season and a change of Club colours to the famous red and white stripes. The women's team came fully under the men's club as of the 2022–23 season, playing numerous games at the Sincil Bank Stadium.

=== 2023–24 season ===
The 2023–24 season saw Lincoln City Women compete in the FA Women's National League Division One Midlands. The club continued to develop its women's programme as part of its wider academy and player-development structure. During the season, Lincoln also played fixtures at the LNER Stadium, increasing the visibility of the women's team within the wider club.

Lincoln City's 2023–24 season included a run in the Women's FA Cup, with the club reaching the first round proper before being eliminated by Derby County. The season also saw the club continue its development of local female players and strengthen its links with the Lincoln City academy structure.

At the conclusion of the season, Lincoln City Women confirmed the departure of several first-team players as the club prepared for the following campaign.

=== 2024–25 season ===
The 2024–25 season marked a further step in the integration of Lincoln City Women into the structure of Lincoln City. The club's commercial material described the women's team as being fully integrated into the academy structure, with the development of local female players identified as a key objective.

Lincoln City Women competed in the FA Women's National League Division One Midlands and finished the season in eighth place. The club's 2024–25 accounts described the team as remaining competitive despite the financial resources available to some of the leading teams in the division. Lincoln also reached the first round of the Women's FA Cup after defeating Lichfield City before being eliminated by higher-division Derby County.

The club continued to develop its women's pathway during the season, with plans being discussed to further integrate the women's team within Lincoln City and to establish progression opportunities for players aged 16 and above through a scholarship programme and links with the University of Lincoln.

=== Lincoln Women FC ===
In July 2025, Lincoln City and Lincoln United announced a strategic collaboration to develop women's football in Lincoln under the Lincoln Women FC identity. The agreement followed a memorandum of understanding between the two clubs and was intended to combine players, coaches and resources to provide a stronger structure for women's football in the city.

Under the new structure, Lincoln Women operated three teams. The senior side competed in the FA Women's National League Division One Midlands at Step 4 of the English women's football pyramid and played its home matches at the Sun-Hat Villas & Resorts Stadium, the home of Lincoln United. The club also committed to playing at least two matches per season at the LNER Stadium. A second Lincoln Women side competed in the East Midlands Women's Regional Football League at Step 5, while a third team competed in the Lincolnshire Women and Girls' County Football League at Step 6.

Lee Mitchell was appointed manager of the senior Lincoln Women team for the new structure, supported by Steve Hardie and Alan Murray. The arrangement was intended to create a fluid pathway between the three teams and provide opportunities for players to develop at an appropriate competitive level.

The formation of Lincoln Women FC represented a significant change in the organisation of women's football in Lincoln. Lincoln City described the collaboration as an opportunity to establish a team capable of challenging at Step 4 and, in time, progressing to Step 3, while creating a stronger pathway for women and girls in Lincolnshire.

The new identity was also reflected in the club's branding, with Lincoln Women FC adopting a unified visual identity while retaining the historic identities of the teams operating under the umbrella structure.

=== 2025–26 season ===
Lincoln Women competed in the FA Women's National League Division One Midlands during the 2025–26 season. The senior team continued to operate at Step 4, while the wider Lincoln Women structure provided teams at Steps 5 and 6.

During the season, Lincoln Women players became increasingly involved in the wider activities of Lincoln City. In December 2025, players from Lincoln Women joined Lincoln City's men's first-team players on a visit to Lincoln County Hospital as part of the club's community activities.

The season also marked the continuation of the club's three-team structure and its emphasis on developing players through the different levels of the women's football pyramid. Lincoln City described the collaboration as providing a pathway through which players could progress towards the senior team according to their development needs.

During the 2025–26 season, Alexandre Brito Nogueira was appointed as Lincoln Women's first-team manager. He took charge on 22 August 2025, having previously worked in coaching and development roles within the women's game, including with Aston Villa, Everton, Doncaster Belles and Lichfield City. His tenure came during a difficult period for Lincoln Women, with the team struggling for results in Division One Midlands. Nogueira subsequently left the club during the season, with Lincoln Women confirming a change in management as the club sought to improve its fortunes.

In March 2026, Tom Padden was appointed as Lincoln Women's first-team manager. Padden joined the club from fellow Lincolnshire side Gainsborough Trinity Women, where he had taken charge during the 2025–26 season and helped the club secure its position in the fifth tier. He had previously worked across women's football, youth development and player pathways in Lincolnshire and the East Midlands. His appointment was made alongside that of Katie Rowson as technical director, as Lincoln Women began a wider restructuring of its footballing operation following relegation from Division One Midlands. Padden subsequently led Lincoln Women to the Lincolnshire Women's County Cup final, where they defeated Spalding United Women 6–0, with Amanda Millar scoring a hat-trick.

=== 2026–27 season ===
Following the 2025–26 campaign, Lincoln Women entered the 2026–27 season as part of the continuing Lincoln Women FC structure. The club retained a number of players from the previous season and recruited additional players as it sought to build a competitive squad and establish a long-term pathway for women's football in Lincoln.

Lincoln Women continued to operate under the joint structure created by Lincoln City and Lincoln United, with the senior team representing the highest level of the club's women's pathway and the additional teams providing opportunities for player development at lower levels of the pyramid.

Ahead of the 2026–27 season, Lincoln Women undertook a significant recruitment programme following their return to Step 5. The club brought back players with previous links to women's football in Lincoln, including Heather Pettit, Katy Thornley and Lauren Churcher, while also recruiting from local rivals Gainsborough Trinity, with Lauren Crellin, Shannon Carte, Emma Gough, Lauren Cassin and Lucia Booth-Roberts joining the club. All had been members of the Gainsborough Trinity squad during the 2025–26 season. Further additions included Cody Webb from Northampton Town and Constance Onyinah and Alicia Podd from Spalding United Women. Onyinah had been Spalding's leading goalscorer during their 2025–26 campaign, while Podd shared the captaincy as the club reached the Lincolnshire County FA Women's Cup final. The recruitment strategy combined players returning to the club and those with experience of the local women's football pyramid with younger players identified for their potential, reflecting the club's stated intention to develop local talent and establish a competitive squad for its first season back at Step 5.

=== Season-by-season record ===
Season	Division	Position	Women's FA Cup	Notes
2009-10	Lincolnshire County League	1st		Promoted
2010-11	East Midlands Division One North	5th/12		
2011-12	East Midlands Division One North	1st	1st Qualifying Round	Promoted
2012-13	East Midlands Premier Division	5th/12	2nd Qualifying Round	
2013-14	East Midlands Premier Division	2nd/10	1st Round Proper	
2014-15	East Midlands Premier Division	2nd/11	2nd Qualifying Round	Missed promotion by 1 point
2015-16	East Midlands Premier Division	2nd/10	4th Qualifying Round	Walkover against Leicester City in FA Cup
2016-17	East Midlands Premier Division	5th/11	4th Qualifying Round	
2017–18	East Midlands Premier Division	1st/12	1st Round Proper	Promoted
2018–19	FA Women's National League Division 1 Midlands	7th/11	1st Round Proper	
2019–20	FA Women's National League Division 1 Midlands	5th/12	2nd Round Proper	Null and void due to COVID-19 pandemic
2020–21	FA Women's National League Division 1 Midlands	3rd/12	2nd Round Proper	Curtailed due to COVID-19 pandemic
2021-22	FA Women's National League Division 1 Midlands	3rd/12	4th Round Proper	
2022-23	FA Women's National League Division 1 Midlands	6th/12	3rd Qualifying Round	
2023-24	FA Women's National League Division 1 Midlands	8th/12	1st Round Proper	
2024-25	FA Women's National League Division 1 Midlands	12th/12	1st Round Proper	
2025-26	FA Women's National League Division 1 Midlands	12th/12	1st Round Proper	Playing as Lincoln United WFC after merger
2026-27	East Midlands Premier Division			

== Stadium ==
Lincoln City Women play their home games at Ashby Avenue.

The development side will play at the 3G pitch at the ProAmpac Stadium

== Players ==
=== Squad ===
As of August 2026.

Note: Flags indicate national team as defined under FIFA eligibility rules; some limited exceptions apply. Players may hold more than one non-FIFA nationality.

No.	Pos.	Nation	Player
—	GK	ENG	Chloe Gray
—	GK	ENG	Jasmine Ottewell
—	DF	ENG	Katy Thornley
—	DF	ENG	Shannon Carte
—	DF	ENG	Kelly Pointon
—	DF	ENG	Bella Bogg
—	DF	ENG	Lucia Booth-Roberts
—	MF	ENG	Heather Pettit
—	MF	ENG	Olivia Smith
—	MF	ENG	Alicia Podd
—	MF	ENG	Abi Ringrose
—	MF	ENG	Betsy Thomas
—	MF	ENG	Lauren Crellin
—	MF	ENG	Lauren Churcher
—	FW	ENG	Holly Wilson
—	FW	ENG	Lauren Cassin
—	FW	ENG	Daisy Wilkinson
—	FW	ENG	Cody Webb
—	FW	ENG	Constance Onyinah

=== Former players ===
- Ellie Gilliatt July - December 2020
- Olivia Clark (As Nettleham Ladies)

== Other teams ==
Lincoln City Women FC Under 23s compete in the FA Women's National Reserve League Midland Division.

Lincoln City Women work closely with the Lincoln City Foundation and the Academy for Women.

== Club officials ==
Coaching staff

- First team head coach: Tom Padden
- First team assistant coach: Amanda Greenslade
- Technical Director: Katie Rowson

Former manager: Richard Cooper June 2018 - January 2021.

== Honours ==
- East Midlands Women's Football League Premier Division Winners (2017/18)
- Lincolnshire Football Association County Cup Winners (2014, 2015, 2016, 2017, 2018, 2019)
