= 2025–26 FA Women's National League Cup =

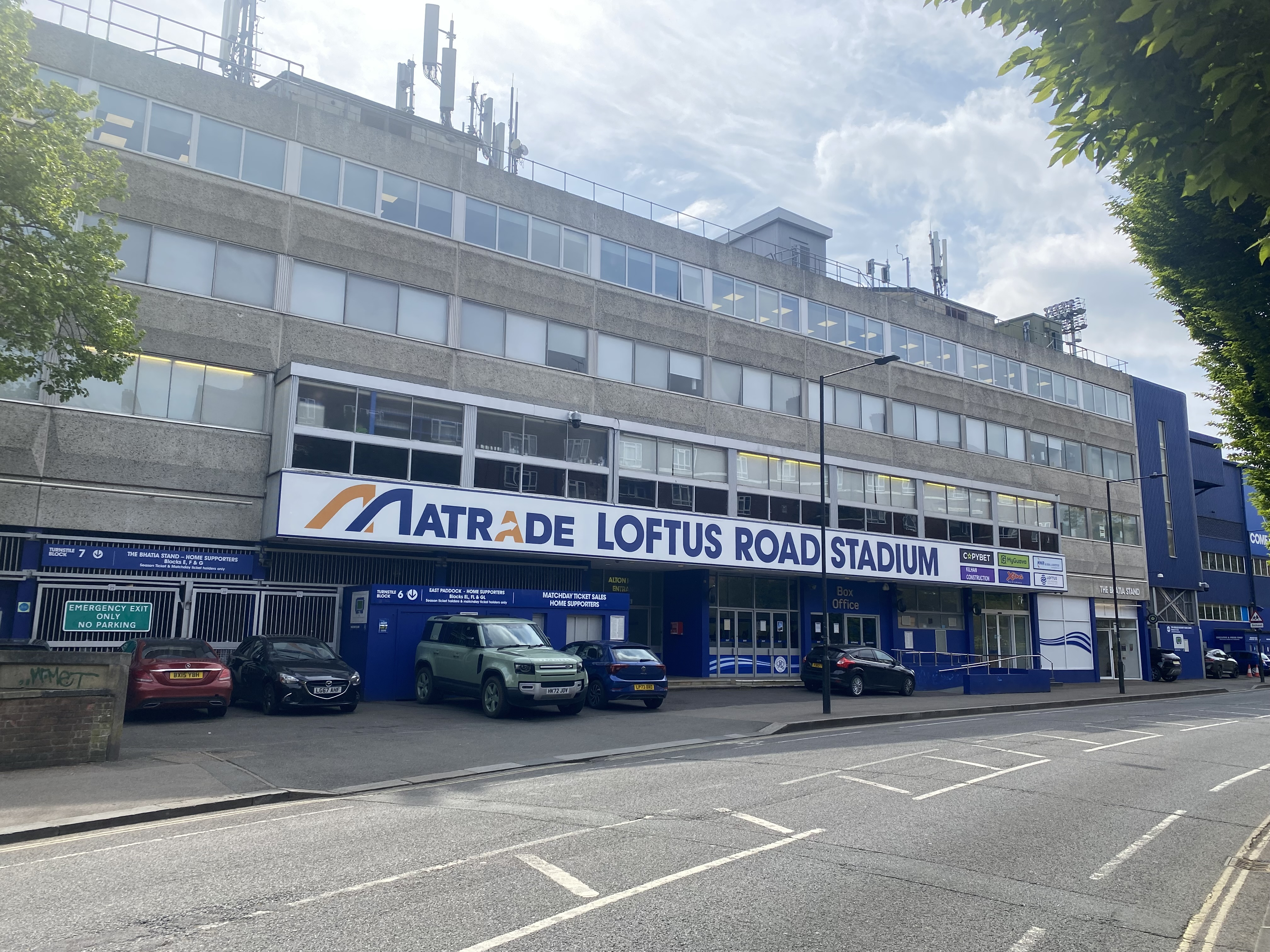
- Loftus Road hosted the final

Tournament details
- Country: England; Wales
- Date: 19 August 2025 - 28 March 2026
- Teams: 88

Final positions
- Champions: AFC Bournemouth (1st title)
- Runners-up: Plymouth Argyle

Tournament statistics
- Matches played: 157
- Goals scored: 596 (3.8 per match)
- All statistics correct as of 2 April 2026.

The 2025–26 FA Women's National League Cup was the 34th running of the FA Women's National League Cup, which began in 1991. It is the major league cup competition run by the FA Women's National League, and is run alongside their secondary league cup competition, the FA Women's National League Plate.

The 2025–26 season saw a change to the format of the League Cup, with the introduction of a group stage and entry of Professional Game Academy sides for the first time. Teams were initially drawn into 22 groups of four teams who played each other once (not twice), and from which the 22 group winners and 10 best runners-up advance to the Cup knockout stages. The other 12 runners-up, and 20 best third-placed teams advance to the National League Plate knockout stages. From there, both the Cup and the Plate hold four knockout rounds before the finals of each competition.

Reigning champions Nottingham Forest did not defend their title, due to their promotion to the Women's Super League 2 at the end of the 2024–25 National League season, making them ineligible to play in the 2025–26 competition.

The final was played on 28 March 2026, and was hosted at Loftus Road in Shepherd's Bush, London. Where AFC Bournemouth beat Plymouth Argyle in a 1–0 victory, to claim their first title.

== Results ==
All results listed are published by The Football Association. With the introduction of a group stage for the 2025–26 season, games are first listed by group in chronological order, and then in alphabetical order of the home team where matches were played simultaneously. For knockout rounds onwards, they are then listed in chronological order, and then in alphabetical order of the home team where matches were played simultaneously.

== Group Stage ==
=== Group A ===
| Pos | Div | Team | Pld | W | D | L | GF | GA | GD | Pts | Qualification |
|---|---|---|---|---|---|---|---|---|---|---|---|
| 1 | 3 | Plymouth Argyle | 3 | 3 | 0 | 0 | 16 | 2 | +14 | 9 | WNL Cup Knockouts |
| 2 | 4 | Bristol Rovers | 3 | 2 | 0 | 1 | 6 | 7 | −1 | 6 | WNL Plate |
| 3 | 4 | Bridgwater United | 3 | 1 | 0 | 2 | 5 | 10 | −5 | 3 | WNL Plate |
| 4 | 4 | Marine Academy Plymouth | 3 | 0 | 0 | 3 | 2 | 10 | −8 | 0 | |

Source: The Football Association

| 4 September 2025 | Marine Academy Plymouth | 1–5 | Plymouth Argyle | Ivybridge |
| 19:45 | Macdonald-Brown 21' | Report | Poole 27'; 39' (o.g.); Kivel 48'; Whitmore 78'; Francis 80' | Stadium: Erme Valley |
Note: Rescheduled due to serious injury to an Argyle player during original, abandoned fixture

| 7 September 2025 | Bristol Rovers | 2–0 | Marine Academy Plymouth | Almondsbury |
| 14:00 BST (UTC+01:00) | Barrett 65'; Bourne-Hallett 74' | Report | | Stadium: Oaklands Park; Attendance: 130 |

| 7 September 2025 | Plymouth Argyle | 5–1 | Bridgwater United | Plymouth |
| 14:00 BST (UTC+01:00) | Francis 10'; Poole 25' (pen.); Crawford 35', 54'; Witmore 79' | Report | Watkins (yellow card) 49' (yellow-red card) 65'; Pengelly 89' (pen.) | Stadium: Home Park; Attendance: 784 |

| 17 September 2025 | Bristol Rovers | 4–1 | Bridgwater United | Yate |
| 19:45 BST (UTC+01:00) | Bassett 19'; Turner 29'; Bloomfield 38', 71' | Report | Pengelly 74' | Stadium: Lodge Road |

| 28 September 2025 | Bridgwater United | 3–1 | Marine Academy Plymouth | Kenn |
| 14:00 BST (UTC+01:00) | Kingdon; Watkins; Lines | Report | Solloway 62' | Stadium: Everyone Active Stadium; Attendance: 61 |

| 28 September 2025 | Bristol Rovers | 0–6 | Plymouth Argyle | Yate |
| 14:00 BST (UTC+01:00) | | Report | Wilson 36'; Dickson 48'; Teisar 53'; Papaioannou 74'; Francis 82', 90+1' | Stadium: Lodge Road |

=== Group B ===
| Pos | Div | Team | Pld | W | D | L | GF | GA | GD | Pts | Qualification |
|---|---|---|---|---|---|---|---|---|---|---|---|
| 1 | 3 | Exeter City | 3 | 3 | 0 | 0 | 13 | 2 | +11 | 9 | WNL Cup Knockouts |
| 2 | PGA | Southampton FC Academy | 3 | 2 | 0 | 1 | 7 | 5 | +2 | 6 | WNL Cup Knockouts |
| 3 | 4 | Portishead Town | 3 | 0 | 1 | 2 | 1 | 7 | −6 | 1 | |
| 4 | 4 | Abingdon United | 3 | 0 | 1 | 2 | 1 | 8 | −7 | 1 | |

Source: The Football Association

| 20 August 2025 | Abingdon United | 0–2 | Southampton FC PGA | Abingdon-on-Thames |
| 19:45 | | Report | Dix-Trujillo 51'; Udebhulu 76' | Stadium: The Northcourt; Attendance: 104 |

| 21 August 2025 | Portishead Town | 0–3 | Exeter City | Portishead |
| 19:45 | | Report | Stacey 12'; Sara 81'; Gillies 83' | Stadium: Bristol Road; Attendance: 92 |

| 7 September 2025 | Abingdon United | 1–1 | Portishead Town | Abingdon-on-Thames |
| 14:00 BST (UTC+01:00) | Lygo 53' | Report | Tanner-Joyce 48' | Stadium: The Northcourt; Attendance: 50 |

| 7 September 2025 | Exeter City | 5–2 | Southampton FC PGA | Newton Abbot |
| 14:00 BST (UTC+01:00) | Baker 3'; Sara 37', 82'; Presswell 45'; Zuurmond 46' | Report | Chads 33'; Matthews 64' (pen.) | Stadium: Coach Road; Attendance: 187 |

| 28 September 2025 | Exeter City | 5–0 | Abingdon United | Newton Abbot |
| 14:00 BST (UTC+01:00) | Stacey 4', 32'; Sara 23'; Durrant 53'; Gillies 66' | Report | | Stadium: Coach Road; Attendance: 149 |

| 28 September 2025 | Portishead Town | 0–3 | Southampton FC PGA | Portishead |
| 14:00 BST (UTC+01:00) | | Report | Dix-Trujillo 51'; Lucas 75'; Matthews 79' | Stadium: Bristol Road; Attendance: 84 |

=== Group C ===
| Pos | Div | Team | Pld | W | D | L | GF | GA | GD | Pts | Qualification |
|---|---|---|---|---|---|---|---|---|---|---|---|
| 1 | 4 | Swindon Town | 3 | 3 | 0 | 0 | 13 | 6 | +7 | 9 | WNL Cup Knockouts |
| 2 | 3 | Gwalia United | 3 | 2 | 0 | 1 | 7 | 6 | +1 | 6 | WNL Plate |
| 3 | PGA | Bristol City PGA | 3 | 1 | 0 | 2 | 6 | 8 | −2 | 3 | WNL Plate |
| 4 | 4 | Keynsham Town | 3 | 0 | 0 | 3 | 1 | 7 | −6 | 0 | |

Source: The Football Association

| 20 August 2025 | Swindon Town | 4–3 | Bristol City PGA | Swindon |
| 19:45 | Colston 1'; Clayton 37'; Cook 70'; Clark 74' | Report | Smith 4'; Giddings 18'; Walby 64' | Stadium: The County Ground; Attendance: 168 |

| 7 September 2025 | Gwalia United | 4–0 | Bristol City PGA | Pontypridd |
| 17:30 BST (UTC+01:00) | McGowan 6'; Gregson 24'; Walters 45'; Asker 80' | Report | | Stadium: University of South Wales Sports Park; Attendance: 258 |

| 7 September 2025 | Swindon Town | 3–1 | Keynsham Town | Swindon |
| 14:00 BST (UTC+01:00) | Davies 20', 69'; King 26' | Report | Todd 38' | Stadium: The County Ground; Attendance: 102 |

| 18 September 2025 | Keynsham Town | 0–1 | Gwalia United | Keynsham |
| 19:45 | | Report | Quick 72' | Stadium: Crown Field; Attendance: 76 |

| 28 September 2025 | Gwalia United | 2–6 | Swindon Town | Pontypridd |
| 14:00 BST (UTC+01:00) | Gregson 33'; Collie 87' | Report | 20' (o.g.); Colston 39', 77'; Viveash 43', 64'; Davies 90+4' | Stadium: University of South Wales Sports Park; Attendance: 255 |

| 28 September 2025 | Keynsham Town | 0–3 | Bristol City PGA | Keynsham |
| 15:30 BST (UTC+01:00) | | Report | Giddings 89', 90+5'; Power 90+3' | Stadium: The AJN Stadium; Attendance: 92 |

=== Group D ===
| Pos | Div | Team | Pld | W | D | L | GF | GA | GD | Pts | Qualification |
|---|---|---|---|---|---|---|---|---|---|---|---|
| 1 | 3 | Lewes | 3 | 3 | 0 | 0 | 5 | 1 | +4 | 9 | WNL Cup Knockouts |
| 2 | 4 | Fulham | 3 | 2 | 0 | 1 | 9 | 4 | +5 | 6 | WNL Cup Knockouts |
| 3 | PGA | Brighton & Hove Albion PGA | 3 | 1 | 0 | 2 | 8 | 7 | +1 | 3 | WNL Plate |
| 4 | 4 | Worthing | 3 | 0 | 0 | 3 | 1 | 11 | −10 | 0 | |

Source: The Football Association

| 20 August 2025 | Worthing | 0–7 | Brighton & Hove Albion PGA | Worthing |
| 19:45 | | Report | Milner; Fergus; Martin; Fowler | Stadium: Woodside Road; Attendance: 151 |

| 20 August 2025 | Fulham | 1–2 | Lewes | New Malden |
| 19:45 | Stead 82' | Report | Ferguson 24', 73' | Stadium: Motspur Park; Attendance: 126 |

| 7 September 2025 | Lewes | 3–0 | Brighton & Hove Albion PGA | Lewes |
| 14:00 BST (UTC+01:00) | Trewhitt 60', 77'; Carpenter 85' | Report | | Stadium: The Dripping Pan; Attendance: 424 |

| 7 September 2025 | Worthing | 1–4 | Fulham | Worthing |
| 15:00 BST (UTC+01:00) | Amerena 59' | Report | Olds 8', 89'; Stead 9'; Gandee Morgan 20' | Stadium: Woodside Road; Attendance: 108 |

| 28 September 2025 | Fulham | 4–1 | Brighton & Hove Albion PGA | New Malden |
| 14:00 BST (UTC+01:00) | Adamson 14'; Olds 49', 63', 82' | Report | Martin 70' | Stadium: Motspur Park; Attendance: 173 |

| 28 September 2025 | Lewes | H-W | Worthing | Lewes |
| 14:00 BST (UTC+01:00) | | Report | | Stadium: The Dripping Pan |
Note: Lewes were awarded the game after Worthing were unable to fulfil the fixture.

=== Group E ===
| Pos | Div | Team | Pld | W | D | L | GF | GA | GD | Pts | Qualification |
|---|---|---|---|---|---|---|---|---|---|---|---|
| 1 | 3 | AFC Bournemouth | 3 | 3 | 0 | 0 | 11 | 0 | +11 | 9 | WNL Cup Knockouts |
| 2 | 4 | Moneyfields | 3 | 1 | 1 | 1 | 3 | 2 | +1 | 4 | WNL Plate |
| 3 | 4 | Ascot United | 3 | 1 | 1 | 1 | 4 | 6 | −2 | 4 | WNL Plate |
| 4 | 4 | Bournemouth Sports FC | 3 | 0 | 0 | 3 | 0 | 10 | −10 | 0 | |

Source: The Football Association

| 19 August 2025 | Ascot United | 0–0 | Moneyfields | Ascot |
| 19:45 | | Report | | Stadium: The Racecourse; Attendance: 112 |

| 20 August 2025 | AFC Bournemouth | 3–0 | Bournemouth Sports FC | Ringwood |
| 19:45 | Bowers 38'; Markham; Quirk 65' | Report | | Stadium: The Ringwood Community Hub |

| 7 September 2025 | AFC Bournemouth | 2–0 | Moneyfields | Ringwood |
| 14:00 BST (UTC+01:00) | Quirk 13', 47' | Report | | Stadium: The Ringwood Community Hub; Attendance: 284 |

| 7 September 2025 | Bournemouth Sports FC | 0–4 | Ascot United | New Milton |
| 14:00 BST (UTC+01:00) | | Report | Lane 26'; Delaney 49'; Huntley 65'; Fox 67' | Stadium: Fawcetts Field; Attendance: 95 |

| 28 September 2025 | Ascot United | 0–6 | AFC Bournemouth | Ascot |
| 14:00 BST (UTC+01:00) | | Report | Quirk 3', 56'; Hennessy 7'; Markham 12', 51', 89' | Stadium: The Racecourse; Attendance: 104 |

| 28 September 2025 | Moneyfields | 3–0 | Bournemouth Sports FC | Portsmouth |
| 14:00 BST (UTC+01:00) | Beard 14'; Scott 26', 60' | Report | | Stadium: The John Jenkins Stadium; Attendance: 74 |

=== Group F ===
| Pos | Div | Team | Pld | W | D | L | GF | GA | GD | Pts | Qualification |
|---|---|---|---|---|---|---|---|---|---|---|---|
| 1 | 3 | Cheltenham Town | 3 | 3 | 0 | 0 | 11 | 1 | +10 | 9 | WNL Cup Knockouts |
| 2 | PGA | Birmingham City PGA | 3 | 1 | 1 | 1 | 4 | 7 | −3 | 4 | WNL Plate |
| 3 | 4 | Worcester City | 3 | 1 | 0 | 2 | 3 | 4 | −1 | 3 | WNL Plate |
| 4 | 4 | Kidderminster Harriers | 3 | 0 | 1 | 2 | 3 | 9 | −6 | 1 | |

Source: The Football Association

| 21 August 2025 | Cheltenham Town | 2–0 | Worcester City | Bishop's Cleeve |
| 19:45 | Owen 12' (pen.), 44' | Report | | Stadium: Kayte Lane Stadium; Attendance: 102 |

| 21 August 2025 | Kidderminster Harriers | 2–2 | Birmingham City PGA | Droitwich |
| 19:45 | Gallagher; Harris (pen.) | Report | Fitzpatrick; Foster (pen.) | Stadium: King George V Playing Fields |

| 7 September 2025 | Cheltenham Town | 4–0 | Birmingham City PGA | Evesham |
| 14:00 BST (UTC+01:00) | Newns 10'; Jones; Lue; Guymira 67' | Report | | Stadium: The Spiers and Hartwell Jubilee Stadium; Attendance: 110 |

| 7 September 2025 | Worcester City | 2–0 | Kidderminster Harriers | Worcester |
| 14:00 BST (UTC+01:00) | Fassnidge 67'; Billingsley 73' | Report | | Stadium: Sixways Stadium; Attendance: 275 |

| 28 September 2025 | Kidderminster Harriers | 1–5 | Cheltenham Town | Droitwich |
| 14:00 BST (UTC+01:00) | Harris 3' | Report | Bell 15', 38'; Guymira 45'; Curtis 53'; Arnott 67' | Stadium: King George V Playing Field; Attendance: 75 |

| 28 September 2025 | Worcester City | 1–2 | Birmingham City PGA | Worcester |
| 14:00 BST (UTC+01:00) | Fassnidge 9' | Report | Powis 21', 38' | Stadium: Sixways Stadium; Attendance: 212 |

=== Group G ===
| Pos | Div | Team | Pld | W | D | L | GF | GA | GD | Pts | Qualification |
|---|---|---|---|---|---|---|---|---|---|---|---|
| 1 | 4 | Chatham Town | 3 | 3 | 0 | 0 | 11 | 4 | +7 | 9 | WNL Cup Knockouts |
| 2 | 4 | AFC Sudbury | 3 | 2 | 0 | 1 | 5 | 3 | +2 | 6 | WNL Cup Knockouts |
| 3 | PGA | London City Lionesses PGA | 3 | 1 | 0 | 2 | 5 | 8 | −3 | 3 | WNL Plate |
| 4 | 3 | Billericay Town | 3 | 0 | 0 | 3 | 1 | 7 | −6 | 0 | |

Source: The Football Association

| 19 August 2025 | AFC Sudbury | 3–1 | Billericay Town | Sudbury |
| 19:45 | Bezant; Abrehart; Morton | Report | Nee-Chambers | Stadium: King's Marsh Stadium; Attendance: 65 |

| 20 August 2025 | Chatham Town | 6–4 | London City Lionesses PGA | Chatham |
| 19:45 | Woodgate 17', 51', 64', 90'; Russ 45+1', 78' | Report | Kabo; Johnson; Hope | Stadium: Bauvil Stadium; Attendance: 249 |

| 7 September 2025 | AFC Sudbury | 2–0 | London City Lionesses PGA | Sudbury |
| 14:00 BST (UTC+01:00) | Slater; Allen | Report | | Stadium: King's Marsh; Attendance: 85 |

| 7 September 2025 | Billericay Town | 0–3 | Chatham Town | Billericay |
| 14:00 BST (UTC+01:00) | | Report | M. Woodgate 7'; A. Woodgate 16'; Jones 24' (pen.) | Stadium: New Lodge; Attendance: 153 |

| 28 September 2025 | Billericay Town | 0–1 | London City Lionesses PGA | Billericay |
| 14:00 BST (UTC+01:00) | | Report | Evans | Stadium: New Lodge; Attendance: 125 |

| 28 September 2025 | Chatham Town | 2–0 | AFC Sudbury | Chatham |
| 14:30 BST (UTC+01:00) | Sharp 55'; Iton 57' | Report | | Stadium: Maidstone Road; Attendance: 127 |

=== Group H ===
| Pos | Div | Team | Pld | W | D | L | GF | GA | GD | Pts | Qualification |
|---|---|---|---|---|---|---|---|---|---|---|---|
| 1 | 4 | Actonians | 3 | 2 | 1 | 0 | 4 | 2 | +2 | 7 | WNL Cup Knockouts |
| 2 | PGA | Chelsea PGA | 3 | 2 | 0 | 1 | 11 | 5 | +6 | 6 | WNL Cup Knockouts |
| 3 | 4 | Maidenhead United | 3 | 1 | 0 | 2 | 1 | 8 | −7 | 3 | WNL Plate |
| 4 | 3 | AFC Wimbledon | 3 | 0 | 1 | 2 | 3 | 4 | −1 | 1 | |

Source: The Football Association

| 20 August 2025 | AFC Wimbledon | 2–3 | Chelsea PGA | Sudbury |
| 19:45 | Dorey 34'; Donovan 90+2' | Report | Shooter; Johnson | Stadium: King's Marsh Stadium |

| 20 August 2025 | Maidenhead United | 0–1 | Actonians | Maidenhead |
| 19:45 | | Report | Dunbar-Bonnie 51' | Stadium: York Road (Maidenhead); Attendance: 60 |

| 7 September 2025 | Actonians | 2–1 | Chelsea PGA | Greenford |
| 14:00 BST (UTC+01:00) | O'Reilly 4'; Cholakian 42' | Report | Hendle 37' | Stadium: Berkeley Fields; Attendance: 114 |

| 7 September 2025 | AFC Wimbledon | A - W | Maidenhead United | Morden |
| 14:00 BST (UTC+01:00) | | Report | | Stadium: Imperial Fields |
Note: Maidenhead United were awarded the game after AFC Wimbledon were charged with fielding an ineligible player during the Group Stage game.

| 28 September 2025 | Actonians | 1–1 | AFC Wimbledon | Greenford |
| 14:00 BST (UTC+01:00) | Dunbar-Bonnie 46' | Report | Russell 90+2' | Stadium: Berkeley Fields; Attendance: 61 |

| 28 September 2025 | Maidenhead United | 1–7 | Chelsea PGA | Maidenhead |
| 14:00 BST (UTC+01:00) | Stockton 46' | Report | Hendle 20', 69', 87'; Shooter 42', 62', 65', 83' | Stadium: York Road; Attendance: 75 |

=== Group I ===
| Pos | Div | Team | Pld | W | D | L | GF | GA | GD | Pts | Qualification |
|---|---|---|---|---|---|---|---|---|---|---|---|
| 1 | 3 | Hashtag United | 3 | 2 | 1 | 0 | 9 | 3 | +6 | 7 | WNL Cup Knockouts |
| 2 | 4 | Dulwich Hamlet | 3 | 2 | 0 | 1 | 4 | 2 | +2 | 6 | WNL Cup Knockouts |
| 3 | 4 | London Bees | 3 | 1 | 1 | 1 | 6 | 6 | 0 | 4 | WNL Plate |
| 4 | PGA | Crystal Palace PGA | 3 | 0 | 0 | 3 | 3 | 11 | −8 | 0 | |

Source: The Football Association

| 20 August 2025 | Hashtag United | 6–1 | Crystal Palace PGA | Aveley |
| 19:45 | Nicholls 11', 32', 83'; Adesan 41', 51'; Mulvaney 60' | Report | Moynihan 80' | Stadium: Parkside; Attendance: 166 |

| 21 August 2025 | London Bees | 1–2 | Dulwich Hamlet | Edgware |
| 19:45 | Larkin 7' | Report | Francis-Weir 50', 70' | Stadium: The Hive Stadium; Attendance: 77 |

| 7 September 2025 | Dulwich Hamlet | 2–0 | Crystal Palace PGA | East Dulwich |
| 14:00 BST (UTC+01:00) | Gall; Taylor 87' | Report | | Stadium: Champion Hill; Attendance: 565 |

| 7 September 2025 | Hashtag United | 2–2 | London Bees | Aveley |
| 15:00 BST (UTC+01:00) | Adesan 38'; Tomlin 45+1' | Report | Larkin 72'; Flynn 74' | Stadium: Parkside; Attendance: 145 |

| 28 September 2025 | Dulwich Hamlet | 0–1 | Hashtag United | East Dulwich |
| 14:00 BST (UTC+01:00) | | Report | Nicholls 32' | Stadium: Champion Hill; Attendance: 386 |

| 28 September 2025 | London Bees | 3–2 | Crystal Palace PGA | Edgware |
| 14:00 BST (UTC+01:00) | Isherwood 71', 85'; Heil 90+2' | Report | De Gregorio; Rowe | Stadium: The Hive Stadium; Attendance: 91 |

=== Group J ===
| Pos | Div | Team | Pld | W | D | L | GF | GA | GD | Pts | Qualification |
|---|---|---|---|---|---|---|---|---|---|---|---|
| 1 | 3 | Watford | 3 | 3 | 0 | 0 | 22 | 0 | +22 | 9 | WNL Cup Knockouts |
| 2 | 4 | Queens Park Rangers | 3 | 2 | 0 | 1 | 13 | 8 | +5 | 6 | WNL Cup Knockouts |
| 3 | 4 | Chesham United | 3 | 1 | 0 | 2 | 1 | 16 | −15 | 3 | WNL Plate |
| 4 | PGA | Charlton Athletic PGA | 3 | 0 | 0 | 3 | 1 | 13 | −12 | 0 | |

Source: The Football Association

| 20 August 2025 | Watford | 7–0 | Charlton Athletic PGA | Ruislip |
| 19:45 | Fisher 15'; Ayisi 52'; Rossiter 57', 64'; Walsh 70'; Fyfe 73', 81' | Report | | Stadium: Grosvenor Vale; Attendance: 152 |

| 21 August 2025 | Chesham United | 1–7 | Queens Park Rangers | Chesham |
| 19:45 | Collett 40' | Report | Doyle 15'; 19' (o.g.); Ali 42'; Leach 49'; Adebowale-Arimoro 49'; Makowska 75'; Stanley 82' | Stadium: The Meadow |

| 7 September 2025 | Queens Park Rangers | 6–1 | Charlton Athletic PGA | Perivale |
| 14:00 BST (UTC+01:00) | Dzyadyk 13', 49'; Mehmet 16', 37', 84' (pen.), 85' | Report | McMahon 53' | Stadium: The Powerday Stadium; Attendance: 100 |

| 7 September 2025 | Watford | 9–0 | Chesham United | Kings Langley |
| 14:00 BST (UTC+01:00) | O'Meara 29'; Ayisi 40'; Paul 42', 44', 63'; Filbey 47'; Perry 52'; Chandler 79'; Kendell 82' | Report | | Stadium: The Orbital Fasteners Stadium; Attendance: 183 |

| 28 September 2025 | Chesham United | H-W | Charlton Athletic PGA | Chesham |
| 14:00 BST (UTC+01:00) | | Report | | Stadium: The Meadow |
Note: Charlton informed the WNL that the club would be unable to participate in this fixture, and as such Chesham were awarded the tie and awarded the three points.

| 28 September 2025 | Queens Park Rangers | 0–6 | Watford | Perivale |
| 14:00 BST (UTC+01:00) | | Report | Kuyken 3'; Perry 9'; Fisher 24', 33'; Paul 44'; Georgiou 58' | Stadium: The Powerday Stadium; Attendance: 90 |

=== Group K ===
| Pos | Div | Team | Pld | W | D | L | GF | GA | GD | Pts | Qualification |
|---|---|---|---|---|---|---|---|---|---|---|---|
| 1 | 3 | Rugby Borough | 3 | 3 | 0 | 0 | 8 | 1 | +7 | 9 | WNL Cup Knockouts |
| 2 | 4 | Loughborough Lightning | 3 | 1 | 0 | 2 | 5 | 4 | +1 | 3 | WNL Plate |
| 3 | 4 | Northampton Town | 3 | 1 | 0 | 2 | 3 | 5 | −2 | 3 | WNL Plate |
| 4 | PGA | Arsenal PGA | 3 | 1 | 0 | 2 | 3 | 9 | −6 | 3 | |

Source: The Football Association

| 20 August 2025 | Loughborough Lightning | 1–2 | Rugby Borough | Loughborough |
| 19:45 | Mutch 68' | Report | Mallon 55'; Wiseman 90+2' | Stadium: Loughborough University Stadium; Attendance: 147 |

| 21 August 2025 | Northampton Town | 3–1 | Arsenal PGA | Moulton |
| 19:45 | Maia 35', 90+2'; Noble 90+6' | Report | Bowe 47' | Stadium: O'Riordan Bond Stadium; Attendance: 240 |

| 7 September 2025 | Loughborough Lightning | 1–2 | Arsenal PGA | Loughborough |
| 14:00 BST (UTC+01:00) | Coutts 22' | Report | Heard 53'; Antoine-Eva 83' | Stadium: Holywell Sports Complex; Attendance: 85 |

| 7 September 2025 | Rugby Borough | 1–0 | Northampton Town | Rugby |
| 14:00 BST (UTC+01:00) | Barton 40' | Report | | Stadium: Kilsby Lane; Attendance: 238 |

| 28 September 2025 | Northampton Town | 0–2 | Loughborough Lightning | Moulton |
| 14:00 BST (UTC+01:00) | | Report | Mitchell-Ramon 27'; Cooper 88' | Stadium: O'Riordan Bond Stadium; Attendance: 70 |

| 28 September 2025 | Rugby Borough | 5–0 | Arsenal PGA | Rugby |
| 15:00 BST (UTC+01:00) | Potts 22', 28'; Clarkson 35'; Roberts 74'; Mosby 84' | Report | | Stadium: Kilsby Lane; Attendance: 249 |

=== Group L ===
| Pos | Div | Team | Pld | W | D | L | GF | GA | GD | Pts | Qualification |
|---|---|---|---|---|---|---|---|---|---|---|---|
| 1 | 3 | Real Bedford | 3 | 3 | 0 | 0 | 7 | 2 | +5 | 9 | WNL Cup Knockouts |
| 2 | 4 | Norwich City | 3 | 2 | 0 | 1 | 3 | 2 | +1 | 6 | WNL Plate |
| 3 | 4 | Cambridge United | 3 | 1 | 0 | 2 | 3 | 4 | −1 | 3 | WNL Plate |
| 4 | 4 | Peterborough United | 3 | 0 | 0 | 3 | 2 | 7 | −5 | 0 | |

Source: The Football Association

| 19 August 2025 | Norwich City | 2–0 | Peterborough United | Horsford |
| 19:45 | Moore 25'; Hall 88' | Report | | Stadium: The Nest; Attendance: 251 |

| 20 August 2025 | Cambridge United | 1–2 | Real Bedford | St Neots |
| 19:45 | Richards 59' | Report | Logie 19', 90+6' | Stadium: Rowley Park; Attendance: 148 |

| 7 September 2025 | Peterborough United | 1–2 | Cambridge United | Peterborough |
| 14:00 BST (UTC+01:00) | 78' (o.g.) | Report | Bell 16'; Richards 20' | Stadium: Lincoln Road; Attendance: 411 |

| 7 September 2025 | Real Bedford | 2–0 | Norwich City | Bedford |
| 14:00 BST (UTC+01:00) | Logie 25'; Bryant 89' | Report | | Stadium: McMullen Park; Attendance: 223 |

| 28 September 2025 | Cambridge United | 0–1 | Norwich City | St Neots |
| 14:00 BST (UTC+01:00) | | Report | Flye | Stadium: Rowley Park; Attendance: 223 |

| 28 September 2025 | Real Bedford | 3–1 | Peterborough United | Bedford |
| 14:00 BST (UTC+01:00) | Grant 68', 88'; Logie 86' | Report | Brown 47' | Stadium: McMullen Park; Attendance: 192 |

=== Group M ===
| Pos | Div | Team | Pld | W | D | L | GF | GA | GD | Pts | Qualification |
|---|---|---|---|---|---|---|---|---|---|---|---|
| 1 | 3 | Oxford United | 3 | 3 | 0 | 0 | 12 | 1 | +11 | 9 | WNL Cup Knockouts |
| 2 | 4 | Luton Town | 3 | 2 | 0 | 1 | 6 | 6 | 0 | 6 | WNL Plate |
| 3 | PGA | Tottenham Hotspur PGA | 3 | 1 | 0 | 2 | 5 | 8 | −3 | 3 | WNL Plate |
| 4 | 4 | Milton Keynes Dons | 3 | 0 | 0 | 3 | 2 | 10 | −8 | 0 | |

| 20 August 2025 | Luton Town | 4–1 | Tottenham Hotspur PGA | Barton-le-Clay |
| 19:45 | Lewis 18'; Ward-Chambers 30'; Leighton 40'; Swarres 69' | Report | Elmes 69' | Stadium: Sharpenhoe Road; Attendance: 304 |

| 20 August 2025 | Milton Keynes Dons | 0–5 | Oxford United | Bedford |
| 19:45 | | Report | Lindbek 21'; Thompson 27'; Manders 44'; Barker 85' | Stadium: The New Eyrie; Attendance: 103 |

| 7 September 2025 | Luton Town | 2–1 | Milton Keynes Dons | Barton-le-Clay |
| 14:00 BST (UTC+01:00) | Milliken 44'; Fensome 78' | Report | Omenazu 88' | Stadium: Sharpenhoe Road; Attendance: 211 |

| 7 September 2025 | Oxford United | 3–1 | Tottenham Hotspur PGA | Marston |
| 14:00 BST (UTC+01:00) | Thompson 3'; Barrett 28'; Turner 61' | Report | Pierre 90+2' | Stadium: Marsh Lane; Attendance: 221 |

| 28 September 2025 | Milton Keynes Dons | 1–3 | Tottenham Hotspur PGA | Milton Keynes |
| 14:00 BST (UTC+01:00) | Knox | Report | Fuller-Fagan 38'; Fletcher 41' (o.g.); Endacott 85' | Stadium: Stadium MK; Attendance: 294 |

| 28 September 2025 | Oxford United | 4–0 | Luton Town | Marston |
| 14:00 BST (UTC+01:00) | Palmer; Thompson 7'; Barker 18'; Lindbek 84' | Report | | Stadium: Marsh Lane; Attendance: 127 |

=== Group N ===
| Pos | Div | Team | Pld | W | D | L | GF | GA | GD | Pts | Qualification |
|---|---|---|---|---|---|---|---|---|---|---|---|
| 1 | 3 | West Bromwich Albion | 3 | 3 | 0 | 0 | 8 | 0 | +8 | 9 | WNL Cup Knockouts |
| 2 | 4 | Leafield Athletic | 3 | 2 | 0 | 1 | 5 | 3 | +2 | 6 | WNL Cup Knockouts |
| 3 | PGA | Leicester City PGA | 3 | 1 | 0 | 2 | 6 | 5 | +1 | 3 | WNL Plate |
| 4 | 4 | Stourbridge | 3 | 0 | 0 | 3 | 2 | 13 | −11 | 0 | |

Source: The Football Association

| 20 August 2025 | Stourbridge | 0–4 | West Bromwich Albion | Redditch |
| 19:45 | | Report | (o.g.); Hammond-Mclean; Jhamat | Stadium: The Cherry Tree Stadium; Attendance: 65 |

| 21 August 2025 | Leafield Athletic | 1–1 | Leicester City PGA | Castle Vale |
| 19:45 | Fishwick 90+5' | Report | Saunders 50' | Stadium: Vale Stadium; Attendance: 50 |
Note: Leicester City PGA were charged with fielding ineligible players during this match, and all 3 points were awarded to Leafield Athletic.

| 7 September 2025 | Leafield Athletic | 4–0 | Stourbridge | Castle Vale |
| 14:00 BST (UTC+01:00) | G. Fraser 5'; Gallop 49'; Horgan 88'; B. Fraser 90+1' | Report | | Stadium: Vale Stadium; Attendance: 70 |

| 7 September 2025 | West Bromwich Albion | 2–0 | Leicester City PGA | West Bromwich |
| 14:00 BST (UTC+01:00) | Oakley 16'; Kehoe 19' | Report | | Stadium: The Hawthorns; Attendance: 371 |

| 28 September 2025 | Stourbridge | 2–5 | Leicester City PGA | Amblecote |
| 14:00 BST (UTC+01:00) | Owen 73'; Cartwright 75' | Report | Eze; Groves; Kaczmar; Lovelock | Stadium: War Memorial Athletic Ground; Attendance: 98 |

| 28 September 2025 | West Bromwich Albion | 2–0 | Leafield Athletic | Perry Barr |
| 14:00 BST (UTC+01:00) | Jhamat; Warner | Report | | Stadium: Alexander Stadium; Attendance: 137 |

=== Group O ===
| Pos | Div | Team | Pld | W | D | L | GF | GA | GD | Pts | Qualification |
|---|---|---|---|---|---|---|---|---|---|---|---|
| 1 | 4 | Boldmere St. Michaels | 3 | 2 | 1 | 0 | 5 | 2 | +3 | 7 | WNL Cup Knockouts |
| 2 | 3 | Sporting Khalsa | 3 | 2 | 0 | 1 | 4 | 2 | +2 | 6 | WNL Cup Knockouts |
| 3 | PGA | Aston Villa PGA | 3 | 1 | 1 | 1 | 7 | 2 | +5 | 4 | WNL Plate |
| 4 | 4 | Sutton Coldfield Town | 3 | 0 | 0 | 3 | 2 | 12 | −10 | 0 | |

Source: The Football Association

| 19 August 2025 | Sutton Coldfield Town | 0–6 | Aston Villa PGA | Sutton Coldfield |
| 19:45 | | Report | Calder 4'; Badelek 40'; Phipps 63'; Woods 75'; Donnison 89'; Handy 90' | Stadium: Central Ground; Attendance: 94 |

| 19 August 2025 | Sporting Khalsa | 0–1 | Boldmere St. Michaels | Willenhall |
| 19:45 | | Report | Towers 34' | Stadium: Aspray Arena; Attendance: 99 |

| 7 September 2025 | Boldmere St. Michaels | 1–1 | Aston Villa PGA | Sutton Coldfield |
| 14:00 BST (UTC+01:00) | Joyce 44' | Report | Round 7' | Stadium: Boldmere Community Stadium; Attendance: 115 |

| 7 September 2025 | Sutton Coldfield Town | 1–3 | Sporting Khalsa | Sutton Coldfield |
| 14:00 BST (UTC+01:00) | Cassidy 45+1' | Report | Denham 24', 74' (pen.); 53' (o.g.) | Stadium: Central Ground; Attendance: 64 |

| 28 September 2025 | Boldmere St. Michaels | 3–1 | Sutton Coldfield Town | Sutton Coldfield |
| 14:00 BST (UTC+01:00) | Starker 33'; Mitcham 56'; Quirk 88' | Report | Henry 34' | Stadium: The Amber Arena and Community Stadium; Attendance: 110 |

| 28 September 2025 | Sporting Khalsa | 1–0 | Aston Villa PGA | Willenhall |
| 14:00 BST (UTC+01:00) | Owen 90' | Report | | Stadium: Guardian Warehousing Arena; Attendance: 90 |

=== Group P ===
| Pos | Div | Team | Pld | W | D | L | GF | GA | GD | Pts | Qualification |
|---|---|---|---|---|---|---|---|---|---|---|---|
| 1 | 3 | Derby County | 3 | 3 | 0 | 0 | 12 | 3 | +9 | 9 | WNL Cup Knockouts |
| 2 | 4 | Notts County | 3 | 2 | 0 | 1 | 7 | 6 | +1 | 6 | WNL Plate |
| 3 | 4 | Sheffield FC | 3 | 1 | 0 | 2 | 1 | 4 | −3 | 3 | WNL Plate |
| 4 | 4 | Lincoln United | 3 | 0 | 0 | 3 | 4 | 11 | −7 | 0 | |

Source: The Football Association

| 19 August 2025 | Notts County | 1-4 | Derby County | Eastwood |
| 19:45 | Mason 40' (o.g.) | Report | Stevens 29', 50'; Drake 35'; Oakley 69' | Stadium: Coronation Park; Attendance: 138 |

| 21 August 2025 | Lincoln United | 0-1 | Sheffield FC | Lincoln |
| 19:45 | | Report | Morris 43' | Stadium: Ashby Avenue; Attendance: 40 |

| 7 September 2025 | Derby County | 6–2 | Lincoln United | Mickleover |
| 14:00 BST (UTC+01:00) | Drake 36'; Muir 45+2'; Oakley 58'; Skeldon 68'; Edwards 72', 83' | Report | Kruszyna 20'; Green 70' | Stadium: Station Road; Attendance: 251 |

| 7 September 2025 | Sheffield FC | 0–2 | Notts County | Dronfield |
| 14:00 BST (UTC+01:00) | | Report | Hardy 55'; Barnes 58' | Stadium: Home of Football Stadium; Attendance: 88 |

| 28 September 2025 | Lincoln United | 2–4 | Notts County | Lincoln |
| 14:00 BST (UTC+01:00) | Green | Report | Burnett 15', 36', 40'; Greaves 52' | Stadium: Ashby Avenue; Attendance: 62 |

| 28 September 2025 | Sheffield FC | 0–2 | Derby County | Dronfield |
| 14:00 BST (UTC+01:00) | | Report | Wheeler 19'; Wilson 89' | Stadium: Home of Football Stadium; Attendance: 106 |

=== Group Q ===
| Pos | Div | Team | Pld | W | D | L | GF | GA | GD | Pts | Qualification |
|---|---|---|---|---|---|---|---|---|---|---|---|
| 1 | 3 | Wolverhampton Wanderers | 3 | 3 | 0 | 0 | 12 | 3 | +9 | 9 | WNL Cup Knockouts |
| 2 | 3 | Stoke City | 3 | 2 | 0 | 1 | 10 | 4 | +6 | 6 | WNL Cup Knockouts |
| 3 | PGA | Manchester United PGA | 3 | 0 | 1 | 2 | 4 | 7 | −3 | 1 | |
| 4 | 4 | Wythenshawe F.C. | 3 | 0 | 1 | 2 | 2 | 14 | −12 | 1 | |

Source: The Football Association

| 20 August 2025 | Wolverhampton Wanderers | 2–1 | Stoke City | Telford |
| 19:45 | Greengrass 21'; Hughes 90+3' | Report | Wilson 53' | Stadium: New Bucks Head; Attendance: 372 |

| 21 August 2025 | Wythenshawe F.C. | 1–1 | Manchester United PGA | Wythenshawe |
| 19:45 | Johnson 20' | Report | Hoyland-Lau 26' | Stadium: Hollyhedge Park; Attendance: 466 |

| 7 September 2025 | Stoke City | 6–0 | Wythenshawe F.C. | Stone |
| 14:00 BST (UTC+01:00) | Priestley 23', 54'; Cooper 40'; Cole 50'; Scott 80'; Millington 88' | Report | | Stadium: Wellbeing Park; Attendance: 76 |

| 7 September 2025 | Wolverhampton Wanderers | 3–1 | Manchester United PGA | Telford |
| 14:00 BST (UTC+01:00) | Greengrass 53'; Quigley 59'; Hiscox 90+5' | Report | Drury 50' | Stadium: New Bucks Head; Attendance: 120 |

| 28 September 2025 | Stoke City | 3–2 | Manchester United PGA | Yarnfield |
| 14:00 BST (UTC+01:00) | Cole (pen.) 40'; Kennerley 73', 84' | Report | Livingston 58'; Griffiths 70' | Stadium: Wellbeing Park; Attendance: 181 |

| 28 September 2025 | Wythenshawe F.C. | 1–7 | Wolverhampton Wanderers | Sharston |
| 14:00 BST (UTC+01:00) | Johnson 74' | Report | Quigley 4', 53'; Loydon 8'; Worsey 32'; Greengrass 40'; Williams 84'; Hughes 87' | Stadium: Hollyhedge Park; Attendance: 204 |

=== Group R ===
| Pos | Div | Team | Pld | W | D | L | GF | GA | GD | Pts | Qualification |
|---|---|---|---|---|---|---|---|---|---|---|---|
| 1 | 3 | Liverpool Feds | 3 | 1 | 2 | 0 | 4 | 1 | +3 | 5 | WNL Cup Knockouts |
| 2 | 4 | Cheadle Town Stingers FC | 3 | 1 | 2 | 0 | 2 | 2 | 0 | 5 | WNL Plate |
| 3 | 4 | Stockport County | 3 | 0 | 3 | 0 | 4 | 4 | 0 | 3 | WNL Plate |
| 4 | PGA | Liverpool F.C. PGA | 3 | 0 | 1 | 2 | 1 | 4 | −3 | 1 | |

Source: The Football Association

| 20 August 2025 | Stockport County | 1–1 | Liverpool Feds | Stockport |
| 19:45 | Bradshaw 18' | Report | Parry 70' | Stadium: Stockport Sports Village |

| 20 August 2025 | Cheadle Town Stingers FC | H-W | Liverpool F.C. PGA | Cheadle |
| 19:45 BST (UTC+01:00) | | Report | | Stadium: Park Road Stadium |
Note: Liverpool FC PGA were charged with failing to fulfill their match, and all three points from this game were awarded to Cheadle Town Stingers.

| 7 September 2025 | Cheadle Town Stingers FC | 2–2 | Stockport County | Cheadle |
| 14:00 BST (UTC+01:00) | Harris 87'; Houghton 90+4' | Report | Watson 28'; Rathburn 76' | Stadium: Park Road Stadium; Attendance: 137 |

| 7 September 2025 | Liverpool Feds | 3–0 | Liverpool F.C. PGA | Liverpool |
| 14:00 BST (UTC+01:00) | Cole 14'; Anderson 15'; Willis 90' | Report | | Stadium: Walton Hall Park; Attendance: 242 |

| 28 September 2025 | Liverpool Feds | 0–0 | Cheadle Town Stingers FC | Liverpool |
| 14:00 BST (UTC+01:00) | | Report | | Stadium: Walton Hall Park; Attendance: 188 |

| 28 September 2025 | Stockport County | 1–1 | Liverpool F.C. PGA | Stockport |
| 14:00 BST (UTC+01:00) | Battle 72' | Report | Duffy | Stadium: Edgeley Park; Attendance: 1,690 |

=== Group S ===
| Pos | Div | Team | Pld | W | D | L | GF | GA | GD | Pts | Qualification |
|---|---|---|---|---|---|---|---|---|---|---|---|
| 1 | 3 | Hull City | 3 | 2 | 1 | 0 | 13 | 4 | +9 | 7 | WNL Cup Knockouts |
| 2 | PGA | Sheffield United PGA | 3 | 2 | 0 | 1 | 4 | 6 | −2 | 6 | WNL Plate |
| 3 | 4 | Doncaster Rovers Belles | 3 | 1 | 0 | 2 | 2 | 7 | −5 | 3 | WNL Plate |
| 4 | 4 | Barnsley Women | 3 | 0 | 1 | 2 | 2 | 4 | −2 | 1 | |

Source: The Football Association

| 19 August 2025 | Hull City | 5–1 | Doncaster Rovers Belles | North Ferriby |
| 19:45 | Knight 15', 25', 64'; Tanser 46'; Akrill 85' | Report | Abadi 75' | Stadium: Eon Visual Media Stadium; Attendance: 130 |

| 21 August 2025 | Barnsley Women | 0–1 | Sheffield United PGA | Sheffield |
| 19:45 | | Report | Lafayette 10' | Stadium: Steel City Stadium; Attendance: 83 |

| 7 September 2025 | Doncaster Rovers Belles | 1–0 | Barnsley Women | Rotherham |
| 14:00 BST (UTC+01:00) | 76' (o.g.) | Report | | Stadium: Millmoor Stadium; Attendance: 184 |

| 7 September 2025 | Hull City | 6–1 | Sheffield United PGA | North Ferriby |
| 14:00 BST (UTC+01:00) | Foyer; Hamill; Haywood; Knight; Nicholson | Report | Goal | Stadium: Church Road; Attendance: 251 |

| 28 September 2025 | Barnsley Women | 2–2 | Hull City | Little Houghton |
| 14:00 BST (UTC+01:00) | Rolandsen 8'; Lynskey 30' | Report | Akrill; Gigg | Stadium: Houghton Main Miners Welfare Ground; Attendance: 182 |

| 28 September 2025 | Doncaster Rovers Belles | 0–2 | Sheffield United PGA | Rotherham |
| 14:00 BST (UTC+01:00) | | Report | Phillips 62'; Rigg 86' | Stadium: Millmoor Stadium; Attendance: 162 |

=== Group T ===
| Pos | Div | Team | Pld | W | D | L | GF | GA | GD | Pts | Qualification |
|---|---|---|---|---|---|---|---|---|---|---|---|
| 1 | 3 | Burnley | 3 | 3 | 0 | 0 | 21 | 0 | +21 | 9 | WNL Cup Knockouts |
| 2 | 4 | Huddersfield Town | 3 | 2 | 0 | 1 | 4 | 8 | −4 | 6 | WNL Plate |
| 3 | 4 | Chorley | 3 | 1 | 0 | 2 | 8 | 3 | +5 | 3 | WNL Plate |
| 4 | 4 | Blackburn Rovers | 3 | 0 | 0 | 3 | 2 | 24 | −22 | 0 | |

Source: The Football Association

| 20 August 2025 | Blackburn Rovers | 2–3 | Huddersfield Town | Clitheroe |
| 19:45 | Goal | Report | Duffield 2'; Fletcher 22'; Ibbotson 75' | Stadium: EcoGiants Stadium; Attendance: 131 |

| 21 August 2025 | Chorley | 0–2 | Burnley | Euxton |
| 19:45 | | Report | Hartley 28'; Docherty 90' | Stadium: Jim Fowler Memorial Ground |

| 7 September 2025 | Burnley | 6–0 | Huddersfield Town | Leyland |
| 14:00 BST (UTC+01:00) | Chadwick 5', 36'; Cairns 7'; Logan 11'; Kelly 84', 85' | Report | | Stadium: County Ground (Leyland); Attendance: 150 |

| 7 September 2025 | Chorley | 8–0 | Blackburn Rovers | Euxton |
| 14:00 BST (UTC+01:00) | Binks; Ellinson; Hamer; Lawrence; Wood | Report | | Stadium: Jim Fowler Memorial Ground; Attendance: 130 |

| 28 September 2025 | Blackburn Rovers | 0–13 | Burnley | Clitheroe |
| 14:00 BST (UTC+01:00) | | Report | Stringer 3'; Kelly 5', 30'; Chadwick 13', 20', 57'; Cairns 33'; Chandarana 51'; McDaniel 65'; Maxwell 67', 70'; Paul 69'; Logan 75' | Stadium: Shawbridge; Attendance: 358 |

| 28 September 2025 | Huddersfield Town | 1–0 | Chorley | Kirkburton |
| 14:00 BST (UTC+01:00) | Mallin 71' | Report | | Stadium: Stafflex Arena; Attendance: 159 |

=== Group U ===
| Pos | Div | Team | Pld | W | D | L | GF | GA | GD | Pts | Qualification |
|---|---|---|---|---|---|---|---|---|---|---|---|
| 1 | 4 | Leeds United | 3 | 2 | 1 | 0 | 8 | 4 | +4 | 7 | WNL Cup Knockouts |
| 2 | 4 | Norton & Stockton Ancients | 3 | 2 | 1 | 0 | 5 | 2 | +3 | 7 | WNL Cup Knockouts |
| 3 | 3 | Halifax F.C. | 3 | 1 | 0 | 2 | 6 | 4 | +2 | 3 | WNL Plate |
| 4 | 4 | York City | 3 | 0 | 0 | 3 | 3 | 12 | −9 | 0 | |

Source: The Football Association

| 20 August 2025 | Leeds United | 1–0 | Halifax F.C. | Garforth |
| 19:45 | Greene 66' | Report | | Stadium: Bannister Prentice Stadium; Attendance: 146 |

| 21 August 2025 | York City | 0–1 | Norton & Stockton Ancients | York |
| 19:45 | | Report | Owens 83' | Stadium: University of York Sports Centre |

| 7 September 2025 | Halifax F.C. | 6–1 | York City | Bradford |
| 14:00 BST (UTC+01:00) | Davies 8'; Shaw 19'; Strickland 29'; Phillips 34'; Crompton 39'; Jacobs 48' | Report | Bell 63' | Stadium: Myra Shay Park; Attendance: 112 |

| 7 September 2025 | Norton & Stockton Ancients | 2–2 | Leeds United | Stockton-on-Tees |
| 14:00 BST (UTC+01:00) | Rae 63'; Green 90+7' | Report | Hughes 2'; Graham 68' | Stadium: Norton Sports Complex; Attendance: 185 |

| 28 September 2025 | Halifax F.C. | 0–2 | Norton & Stockton Ancients | Bradford |
| 14:30 BST (UTC+01:00) | | Report | West 63'; Owens 68' | Stadium: Myra Shay Park; Attendance: 180 |

| 28 September 2025 | York City | 2–5 | Leeds United | Heslington |
| 14:00 BST (UTC+01:00) | Astle 41'; Hardcastle 45+3' | Report | White 28', 40', 51'; Watson 32'; Smith 68' | Stadium: University of York Sports Centre; Attendance: 187 |

=== Group V ===
| Pos | Div | Team | Pld | W | D | L | GF | GA | GD | Pts | Qualification |
|---|---|---|---|---|---|---|---|---|---|---|---|
| 1 | 3 | Middlesbrough | 3 | 2 | 1 | 0 | 7 | 1 | +6 | 7 | WNL Cup Knockouts |
| 2 | PGA | Sunderland PGA | 3 | 1 | 2 | 0 | 6 | 3 | +3 | 5 | WNL Plate |
| 3 | 4 | Durham Cestria | 3 | 1 | 1 | 1 | 5 | 7 | −2 | 4 | WNL Plate |
| 4 | 4 | Chester-le-Street Town | 3 | 0 | 0 | 3 | 2 | 9 | −7 | 0 | |

Source: The Football Association

| 21 August 2025 | Chester-le-Street Town | 1–4 | Sunderland PGA | Chester-le-Street |
| 19:45 | Hockaday 22' | Report | Boothroyd; Dunbar | Stadium: Moor Park; Attendance: 82 |

| 21 August 2025 | Durham Cestria | 1–4 | Middlesbrough | Brandon |
| 19:45 | Gibbon 51' | Report | Robson; Burn | Stadium: Welfare Ground |

| 7 September 2025 | Chester-le-Street Town | 1–2 | Durham Cestria | Chester-le-Street |
| 14:00 BST (UTC+01:00) | Ashton | Report | Mackie 23'; Collinson 49' | Stadium: Moor Park; Attendance: 86 |

| 7 September 2025 | Middlesbrough | 0–0 | Sunderland PGA | Stockton-on-Tees |
| 14:00 BST (UTC+01:00) | | Report | | Stadium: Bishopton Road West; Attendance: 403 |

| 28 September 2025 | Durham Cestria | 2–2 | Sunderland PGA | Sunderland |
| 14:00 BST (UTC+01:00) | Collinson 19', 26' | Report | Bewicke 28'; Sewell 49' | Stadium: Ford Quarry Hub; Attendance: 95 |

| 28 September 2025 | Middlesbrough | 3–0 | Chester-le-Street Town | Stockton-on-Tees |
| 14:00 BST (UTC+01:00) | Packham 4'; Nelson 55', 59' | Report | | Stadium: Bishopton Road West; Attendance: 203 |

== First Round ==
The draw for the first knockout round was made on 29 September 2025.

All results are published by the Football Association. Games are listed in chronological order, and then in alphabetical order of the home team where matches were played simultaneously.

| 12 October 2025 | AFC Sudbury | 3–1 | Boldmere St. Michaels | Sudbury |
| 14:00 BST | Loomes 45+2', 53' (pen.), 81' | Report | Straker 30' | Stadium: The Elite Travel Stadium; Attendance: 42 |

| 12 October 2025 | Middlesbrough | 1–0 | Rugby Borough | Stockton-on-Tees |
| 14:00 BST | Bell 70' | Report | | Stadium: Bishopton Road West |

| 12 October 2025 | Sporting Khalsa | 0–5 | Wolverhampton Wanderers | Willenhall |
| 14:00 BST | | Report | Sims 1'; Worsey 33'; Williams 75'; Marshall 76'; Hughes 90+2' | Stadium: Aspray Arena; Attendance: 285 |

| 12 October 2025 | West Bromwich Albion | 2–0 | Stoke City | Birmingham |
| 14:00 BST | Warner 14'; Robinson 19' | Report | | Stadium: Alexander Stadium; Attendance: 167 |

| 12 October 2025 | Leafield Athletic | 1–6 | Liverpool Feds | Birmingham |
| 15:00 BST | Gallop 70' | Report | Anderson 2'; Smith 33'; Cole 77'; Fisher 85'; Brady 88'; Butcher 90+4' | Stadium: Vale Stadium |

| 19 October 2025 | Oxford United | 4–0 | Chelsea PGA | Marston |
| 12:00 BST | Thompson 31', 55', 73'; Casley 66' | Report | | Stadium: Marsh Lane; Attendance: 196 |

| 19 October 2025 | Burnley | 6–1 | Norton & Stockton Ancients | Leyland |
| 14:00 BST | Chadwick 8', 40', 83'; Chandarana 19'; Seed 71'; Siddall 90+1' | Report | Atkinson 12' | Stadium: County Ground (Leyland) |

| 19 October 2025 | Cheltenham Town | 2–1 | Southampton FC Academy | Bishop's Cleeve |
| 14:00 BST | Apuusi 2'; Bell 18' | Report | 20' (o.g.) | Stadium: Kayte Lane Stadium |

| 19 October 2025 | Dulwich Hamlet | 1–0 | Chatham Town | East Dulwich |
| 14:00 BST | Francis-Weir 52' | Report | | Stadium: Champion Hill; Attendance: 315 |

| 19 October 2025 | Exeter City | 4–2 | Fulham | Newton Abbot |
| 14:00 BST | Gillies 6', 40', 64'; Zuurmond 53' | Report | Rutherford 45+4'; Dungate 88' | Stadium: Coach Road; Attendance: 187 |

| 19 October 2025 | Hashtag United | 1–4 | Lewes | Aveley |
| 14:00 BST | 12' (o.g.) | Report | Godfrey; Edwards; Howells | Stadium: Parkside; Attendance: 128 |

| 19 October 2025 | Hull City | 1–2 | Leeds United | North Ferriby |
| 14:00 BST | Tugby-Andrew 47' | Report | White 10'; Hughes 60' | Stadium: The Versa Sportswear Stadium |

| 19 October 2025 | Queens Park Rangers | 0–1 | AFC Bournemouth | Perivale |
| 14:00 BST | | Report | Thompson 77' | Stadium: The Powerday Stadium |

| 19 October 2025 | Real Bedford | 3–2 | Derby County | Bedford |
| 14:00 BST | Gaylor 4', 73'; Bryant 65' | Report | May 18'; Muir 32' | Stadium: McMullen Park |

| 19 October 2025 | Swindon Town | 2–0 | Actonians | Chippenham |
| 14:00 BST | Colston 6'; Davies 10' | Report | | Stadium: Hardenhuish Park |

| 19 October 2025 | Watford | 0–3 | Plymouth Argyle | Kings Langley |
| 14:00 BST | | Report | Francis 45', 53'; Teisar 49' | Stadium: Orbital Fasteners Stadium; Referee: Peter Kwak |

== Second Round ==
The draw for the second knockout round was made on 20 October 2025.

All results are published by the Football Association. Games are listed in chronological order, and then in alphabetical order of the home team where matches were played simultaneously.

| 9 November 2025 | AFC Sudbury | 0–3 | Wolverhampton Wanderers | Sudbury |
| 14:00 GMT | | Report | Quigley 40'; Merrick 52'; Greengrass 78' | Stadium: The Elite Travel Stadium |

| 9 November 2025 | Burnley | 4–0 | Real Bedford | Leyland |
| 14:00 GMT | Kelly 23', 24'; Logan 60'; Chadwick 88' | Report | | Stadium: County Ground (Leyland); Attendance: 300 |

| 9 November 2025 | Exeter City | 0–3 | AFC Bournemouth | Newton Abbot |
| 14:00 GMT | | Report | Markham 55'; Barron Clark 66', 74' | Stadium: Coach Road; Attendance: 198 |

| 9 November 2025 | Lewes | H–W | Dulwich Hamlet | Lewes |
| 14:00 GMT | | Report | | Stadium: The Dripping Pan |
Note: Lewes were awarded the fixture after Dulwich Hamlet withdrew due to an injury crisis.

| 9 November 2025 | Middlesbrough | 2–1 (a.e.t.) | Liverpool Feds | Stockton-on-Tees |
| 14:00 GMT | Ferguson 78'; Giles 115' | Report | Fisher 88' | Stadium: Bishopton Road West |

| 9 November 2025 | Plymouth Argyle | 3–2 | Oxford United | Plymouth |
| 14:00 GMT | Proctor 54'; Noble 82'; Poole 85' (pen.) | Report | Barrett 15'; Thompson 23' | Stadium: Home Park; Attendance: 850 |

| 9 November 2025 | Swindon Town | 3–1 | Cheltenham Town | Swindon |
| 14:00 GMT | Colston 20', 58'; Davies 23' | Report | Hall 12' | Stadium: The County Ground; Attendance: 185 |

| 9 November 2025 | West Bromwich Albion | 1–1 (a.e.t.) (4–2 p) | Leeds United | Perry Barr |
| 14:00 GMT | Kehoe 69' | Report | Hughes 32' | Stadium: Alexander Stadium; Attendance: 220 |
| | Penalties |
| | Oakley (penalty scored); Warner (penalty scored); Kehoe (penalty missed); Orthodoxou (penalty scored); Robinson (penalty scored) | | Penalty missed Penalty scored |

== Quarter-finals ==
| 11 January 2026 | Burnley | 3–0 | Middlesbrough | Leyland |
| 14:00 GMT | Docherty 2'; Chadwick 45', 50' | Report | | Stadium: County Ground (Leyland); Attendance: 100 |

| 11 January 2026 | Lewes | 0–3 | Plymouth Argyle | Lewes |
| 14:00 GMT | | Report | Poole 18', 62'; Teisar 69' | Stadium: The Dripping Pan; Attendance: 324 |

| 25 January 2026 | Swindon Town | 0–3 | AFC Bournemouth | Swindon |
| 14:00 GMT | | Report | Quirk 8', 59'; Bowers 50' | Stadium: The County Ground; Attendance: 155 |

| 25 January 2026 | Wolverhampton Wanderers | 0–1 | West Bromwich Albion | Wellington |
| 14:00 GMT | | Report | George 51' | Stadium: New Bucks Head; Attendance: 581 |

== Semi-finals ==
| 1 February 2026 | Plymouth Argyle | 4–1 | Burnley | Plymouth |
| 14:00 GMT | Teisar 45+1', 69'; Poole 51' (pen.), 90+5' | Report | Ravening 13' | Stadium: Home Park; Attendance: 931; Referee: Ella Karkoska |

| 8 February 2026 | West Bromwich Albion | 0–2 | AFC Bournemouth | Rugby |
| 14:00 GMT | | Report | Wilson 26'; Markham 81' | Stadium: Kilsby Lane; Attendance: 120 |
Note: The game was rescheduled from 1 February due to weather conditions.

== Final ==
| 28 March 2026 | Plymouth Argyle | 0–1 | AFC Bournemouth | Shepherd's Bush |
| 15:30 | | | Thompson 6' | Stadium: Loftus Road; Attendance: 1,778; Referee: Ciara Barker |
