= List of Middlesbrough F.C. Women seasons =

This is a list of seasons played by Middlesbrough Football Club Women. The list currently covers the period from 1998, the inaugural season of the Northern Combination, to the most recent completed season.

== Key ==
Champions	Runners-up	Promoted	Relegated	♦ Top scorer in division

Key to league competitions:

- FA Women's Premier League Northern Division (Premier League Northern) – The second tier of English women's football until 2011, when it became the third tier.
- Northern Combination Women's Football League (Northern Combination) – The third tier of English women's football until 2011, when it became the fourth tier.
- FA Women's National League Northern Premier Division (Northern Premier Division) – The third tier of English women's football.
- FA Women's National League Northern Division One (Northern Division One) – The fourth tier of English women's football.

Cup Results

- DR = Determining round
- PR = Preliminary round
- Q1 = Qualifying round 1
- Q2 = Qualifying round 2, etc.
- R1 = Round 1
- R2 = Round 2, etc.
- GS = Group Stage
- L16 = Last 16
- QF = Quarter-finals
- SF = Semi-finals
- RU = Runners-up
- W = Winners

== Seasons ==
Season	League									FA Cup	League Cup (Note: Competition dependant on league.)	Other		Top Scorer(s) (Note: League goals only.)	
Season	Division (tier)	Pld	W	D	L	GF	GA	Pts	Pos	FA Cup	League Cup	Competition	Res	Player(s)	Goals
1998–99	Northern Combination (3)	22	13	4	5	49	31	43	4th	R2	—	—	—	—	—
1999–2000	Northern Combination (3)	22	11	4	7	47	24	37	5th	R1	—	—	—	—	—
2000–01	Northern Combination (3)	22	14	4	4	66	37	46	3rd	R1	—	—	—	—	—
2001–02	Northern Combination (3)	22	18	0	4	83	25	54	1st	R2	—	—	—	—	—
2002–03	Premier League Northern (2)	22	6	2	14	25	44	20	9th	R4	R1	—	—	—	—
2003–04	Premier League Northern (2)	20	7	5	8	25	28	26	6th	R5	R2	—	—	—	—
2004–05	Premier League Northern (2)	22	6	6	10	34	41	24	7th	R4	R1	—	—	Lisa Thompson	8
2005–06	Premier League Northern (2)	22	3	3	16	18	41	12	12th	R3	R2	—	—	Stacey Cutler	4
2006–07	Northern Combination (3)	22	15	1	6	58	21	46	3rd	—	—	County Cup	W	—	—
2007–08	Northern Combination (3)	22	12	4	6	51	29	40	4th	R4	—	County Cup	W	—	—
2008–09	Northern Combination (3)	20	10	2	8	54	23	32	4th	R5	—	County Cup	W	—	—
2009–10	Northern Combination (3)	20	14	1	5	63	19	43	2nd	R3	—	—	—	—	—
2010–11	Northern Combination (3)	22	14	1	7	46	34	43	3rd	R2	—	—	—	—	—
2011–12	Northern Combination (4)	22	7	6	9	36	43	26	9th	R2	—	County Cup	SF	—	—
2012–13	Northern Combination (4)	21	11	3	7	49	32	36	4th	R3	—	County Cup	W	—	—
2013–14	Northern Combination (4)	22	11	3	8	43	53	36	6th	R3	—	County Cup	RU	—	—
2014–15	Northern Division One (4)	22	11	4	7	83	54	37	4th	Q3	DR	FA League Plate County Cup	R1 W	Bianca Owens	16
2015–16	Northern Division One (4)	22	17	3	2	90	22	54	1st	Q4	R1	County Cup	RU	Bianca Owens	38 ♦
2016–17	Northern Premier Division (3)	20	14	1	5	60	31	43	2nd	R2	R2	County Cup	R1	Bianca Owens	20 ♦
2017–18	Northern Premier Division (3)	22	14	0	8	63	52	42	3rd	R4	R1	—	—	Emily Scarr	20
2018–19	Northern Premier Division (3)	22	13	4	7	60	41	43	5th	R3	DR	FA League Plate	QF	Emily Scarr Tyler Dodds	11
2019–20	Northern Premier Division (3) (Note: Cancelled as a result of the COVID-19 pandemic.)	15	4	2	9	27	52	14	8th	R2	DR	FA League Plate	SF	Tyler Dodds	7
2020–21	Northern Premier Division (3)	9	2	1	6	15	24	7	9th	R4		—	—	Tyler Dodds	3
2021–22	Northern Premier Division (3)	24	5	3	16	27	67	18	11th	R1	R1	—	—	Armani Maxwell	7
2022–23	Division One North (4)	22	6	3	13	23	46	21	10th	R2	R2	County Cup	W	Armani Maxwell Jessica Dawson	4
2023–24	Division One North (4)	22	13	7	2	45	21	46	2nd	Q3	DR	FA League Plate	R1	Jessica Mett	9
2024–25	Division One North (4)	22	15	6	1	45	13	51	1st	R3	QF	—	—	Jessica Mett	9
2025–26	Northern Premier Division (3)	22	8	7	7	29	30	31	5th	R4	QF	—	—	Armani Maxwell Becky Ferguson	8
