= 2025–26 Middlesbrough F.C. Women season =

Middlesbrough
2025–26 season
- Chairman: Steve Gibson
- Manager: Michael Mulhern (until 16 October); Joe Lillie (from 16 October)
- Stadium: Bishopton Road West; Riverside Stadium
- National League: 5th
- FA Cup: Fourth round
- WNL Cup: Quarter-finals
- Top goalscorer: League: Armani Maxwell; Becky Ferguson (8); All: Becky Ferguson (12)
- Highest home attendance: 1,689 (vs. Derby County, National League, 31 August 2025)
- Lowest home attendance: 201 (vs. Sporting Khalsa, National League, 5 October 2025)
- Average home league attendance: 531
- Biggest win: 4–0 (vs. Cheadle Town (H), FA Cup, 25 October 2025); 4–0 (vs. Derby County (A), National League, 8 February 2026)
- Biggest defeat: 5–0 (vs. Burnley (A), National League, 17 August 2025)
Home colours	Away colours
- All statistics correct as of 26 April 2026.

The 2025–26 season was the 50th season of competitive football in the history of Middlesbrough Football Club Women, and their first season back in the National League North, the third level of English women's football, following promotion the previous season. The club also participated in the FA Cup, and the WNL Cup.

The first round FA Cup fixture between Middlesbrough and Cheadle Town was broadcast live on TNT Sports, an historic first for a women's first round fixture.

== Squad ==
As of 6 February 2026.

Note: Flags indicate national team as defined under FIFA eligibility rules; some limited exceptions apply. Players may hold more than one non-FIFA nationality.

No.	Pos.	Nation	Player
1	GK	ENG	Megan Borthwick
3	DF	ENG	Keira Skelton
4	DF	ENG	Olivia Watt
5	DF	ENG	Ellen Packham
6	DF	ENG	Abby Towers
7	FW	ENG	Ellen Turnbull
8	MF	NIR	Emily Cassap (on loan from Sunderland)
9	FW	ENG	Armani Maxwell
10	MF	ENG	Lauren Robson
11	MF	ENG	Leanna Giles
12	FW	ENG	Erin Nelson
13	GK	ENG	Ruby Cook

No.	Pos.	Nation	Player
14	DF	ENG	Emma Foster
15	DF	ENG	Ella Baker (dual registration with Newcastle United)
16	FW	ENG	Niyah Dunbar (on loan from Sunderland)
17	DF	ENG	Millie Bell (captain)
18	MF	ENG	Sarah Burn
19	FW	ENG	Becky Ferguson
21	FW	ENG	Annie Mitchell
22	DF	ENG	Grace Boyes
23	MF	ENG	Chelsea Callander
24	DF	ENG	Abby Holmes
25	FW	ENG	Maddie Myers

== Transfers ==
=== In ===
Date	Position	Nationality	Name	From	Ref.
1 July 2025	FW	(England)	Becky Ferguson	(England) Newcastle United	
2 July 2025	DF	(England)	Olivia Watt	(England) Newcastle United	
6 July 2025	FW	(England)	Erin Nelson	(England) Stoke City	
8 July 2025	GK	(England)	Megan Borthwick	(England) Sunderland	
11 July 2025	MF	(England)	Chelsea Callander	(England) Manchester City	
25 October 2025	DF	(England)	Abby Holmes	(England) Durham	

=== Loans in ===
Date	Position	Nationality	Name	From	Until	Ref.
12 December 2025	FW	(England)	Niyah Dunbar	(England) Sunderland	29 March 2026	
27 January 2026	DF	(England)	Ella Baker	(England) Newcastle United	End of season	
6 February 2026	MF	(Northern Ireland)	Emily Cassap	(England) Sunderland	End of season	

== Competitions ==
=== National League North ===
==== League table ====
Pos	Team	Pld	W	D	L	GF	GA	GD	Pts
3	Rugby Borough	22	12	5	5	43	27	+16	41
4	Stoke City	22	10	3	9	36	31	+5	33
5	Middlesbrough	22	8	7	7	29	30	−1	31
6	West Bromwich Albion	22	9	4	9	29	31	−2	31
7	Liverpool Feds	22	7	5	10	44	45	−1	26

Source: FA Women's National League
Rules for classification: 1) Points; 2) Goal difference; 3) Number of goals scored

==== Results summary ====
Overall								Home						Away					
Pld	W	D	L	GF	GA	GD	Pts	W	D	L	GF	GA	GD	W	D	L	GF	GA	GD
22	8	7	7	29	30	−1	31	4	3	4	12	13	−1	4	4	3	17	17	0

Last updated: 26 April 2026.
Source: Soccerway

==== Results by round ====
Round	1	2	3	4	5	6	7	8	9	10	11	12	13	14	15	16	17	18	19	20	21	22
Ground	A	H	H	A	A	H	A	H	A	H	A	H	A	A	A	H	H	H	A	H	A	H
Result	L	D	W	L	L	W	W	W	D	L	D	L	D	W	W	L	L	W	D	D	W	D
Position	11	10	8	9	9	7	6	4	4	5	4	6	6	5	5	5	5	5	6	6	5	5
Points	0	1	4	4	4	7	10	13	14	14	15	15	16	19	22	22	22	25	26	27	30	31

Updated to match(es) played on 26 April 2026. Source: Soccerway
A = Away; H = Home; W = Win; D = Draw; L = Loss

==== Matches ====
The FA Women's National League fixtures were released on 15 July 2025.

17 August 2025 1	Burnley	5–0	Middlesbrough	Leyland
14:00 BST	Walker 8'; Lawley 25', 51'; Ravening 45+1'; Paul 90'	Report		Stadium: County Ground

24 August 2025 2	Middlesbrough	0–0	Rugby Borough	Stockton
14:00 BST		Report		Stadium: Bishopton Road West

31 August 2025 3	Middlesbrough	1–0	Derby County	Middlesbrough
14:00 BST	Turnbull 74'	Report		Stadium: Riverside Stadium; Attendance: 1,689

14 September 2025 4	Wolverhampton Wanderers	2–0	Middlesbrough	Wellington
14:00 BST	Merrick 8', 10'	Report		Stadium: SEAH Stadium

21 September 2025 5	Stoke City	2–0	Middlesbrough	Stoke-on-Trent
14:00 BST	Stamps 48', 67'	Report		Stadium: bet365 Stadium

5 October 2025 6	Middlesbrough	2–0	Sporting Khalsa	Stockton
14:00 BST	Turnbull 44'; Giles 90'	Report		Stadium: Bishopton Road West

19 October 2025 7	Liverpool Feds	1–4	Middlesbrough	Walton
14:00 BST	Fisher 38'	Report	Ferguson 12', 28', 43'; Watt 66'	Stadium: Walton Hall Park

29 October 2025 8	Middlesbrough	2–1	Halifax	Redcar
19:45 GMT	Robson 18', 67'	Report	Dobson 35'	Stadium: Green Lane

2 November 2025 9	West Bromwich Albion	1–1	Middlesbrough	Birmingham
14:00 GMT	George 77'	Report	Maxwell 34'	Stadium: Alexander Stadium

16 November 2025 10	Middlesbrough	1–2	Hull City	Stockton
14:00 GMT	Burn 5' (pen.)	Report	Tanser 39'; Knight 42'	Stadium: Bishopton Road West

30 November 2025 11	Loughborough Lightning	0–0	Middlesbrough	Loughborough
14:00 GMT		Report		Stadium: Loughborough University

7 December 2025 12	Middlesbrough	1–3	Burnley	Stockton-on-Tees
14:00 GMT	Holmes 80'	Report	Paul 15'; Docherty 34'; Chadwick 60'	Stadium: Bishopton Road West

1 February 2026 13	Rugby Borough	1–1	Middlesbrough	Rugby
14:00 GMT	Wiseman 40'	Report	Maxwell 50'	Stadium: Kilsby Lane

8 February 2026 14	Derby County	0–4	Middlesbrough	Mickleover
14:00 GMT		Report	Ferguson 40'; Maxwell 52'; Bell 62'; Dunbar 87'	Stadium: Don Amott Arena

19 February 2026 15	Halifax	2–3	Middlesbrough	Bradford
19:45 GMT	Hollin 57'; Whitham 75'	Report	Ferguson 1'; Maxwell 21'; Turnbull 69'	Stadium: Myra Shay Park

22 February 2026 16	Middlesbrough	1–2	Stoke City	Stockton
14:00 GMT	Ferguson 39'	Report	Cole 36'; Cook 44'	Stadium: Bishopton Road West

1 March 2026 17	Middlesbrough	0–3	Wolverhampton Wanderers	Stockton
14:00 GMT		Report	Own Goal 19'; Worsey 24'; George 86'	Stadium: Bishopton Road West

8 March 2026 18	Middlesbrough	3–1	Loughborough Lightning	Stockton
14:00 GMT	Watt 7'; Cassap 40'; Maxwell 75'	Report	Jarowicki 34'	Stadium: Bishopton Road West

22 March 2026 19	Hull City	2–2	Middlesbrough	North Ferriby
14:00 GMT	Own Goal 41'; Tanser 60'	Report	Maxwell 44'; Ferguson 57'	Stadium: Versa Sportswear Stadium

29 March 2026 20	Middlesbrough	1–1	Liverpool Feds	Middlesbrough
14:00 BST	Maxwell 84'	Report	Boydell 32'	Stadium: Riverside Stadium; Attendance: 1,249

12 April 2026 21	Sporting Khalsa	1–2	Middlesbrough	Willenhall
14:00 BST	Own Goal 17'	Report	Maxwell 25'; Ferguson 70'	Stadium: Aspray Arena

26 April 2026 22	Middlesbrough	0–0	West Bromwich Albion	Stockton
14:00 BST		Report		Stadium: Bishopton Road West

=== FA Cup ===
As a member of the third tier, Middlesbrough entered the FA Cup in the first round.

25 October 2025 First round	Middlesbrough	4–0	Cheadle Town	Bishop Auckland
12:15 BST	Ferguson 45+4' (pen.); Watt 55'; Robson 90+11'; Nelson 90+13'	Report		Stadium: Heritage Park
Note: Fixture was initially scheduled for 26 October, but was moved for live TNT Sports broadcast.

23 November 2025 Second round	Middlesbrough	3–0	Northampton Town	Stockton
14:00 GMT	Holmes 33', 65'; Robson 61'	Report		Stadium: Bishopton Road West

14 December 2025 Third round	Middlesbrough	3–0	AFC Fylde	Stockton
14:00 GMT	Holmes 13'; Maxwell 27'; Own Goal 44'	Report		Stadium: Bishopton Road West

18 January 2026 Fourth round	Oxford United	3–1	Middlesbrough	Oxford
13:00 GMT	Barker 85'; Casley 90'; Manders 90+4'	Report	Ferguson 73'	Stadium: Marsh Lane

=== WNL Cup ===
==== Group stage ====
Pos	Div	Team	Pld	W	D	L	GF	GA	GD	Pts	Qualification
1	3	Middlesbrough	3	2	1	0	7	1	+6	7	WNL Cup Knockouts
2	PGA	Sunderland PGA	3	1	2	0	6	3	+3	5	WNL Plate
3	4	Durham Cestria	3	1	1	1	5	7	−2	4	WNL Plate
4	4	Chester-le-Street Town	3	0	0	3	2	9	−7	0	

Source: The Football Association

21 August 2025 1	Durham Cestria	1–4	Middlesbrough	Brandon
19:45 BST	Gibbon 51'	Report	Robson 9', 45'; Turnbull 30'; Burn 42'	Stadium: Welfare Ground

7 September 2025 2	Middlesbrough	0–0	Sunderland PGA	Stockton
14:00 BST		Report		Stadium: Bishopton Road West

28 September 2025 3	Middlesbrough	3–0	Chester-le-Street Town	Stockton
14:00 BST	Packham 4'; Nelson 55'; Ferguson 59'	Report		Stadium: Bishopton Road West

==== Knockout stage ====
12 October 2025 First round	Middlesbrough	1–0	Rugby Borough	Stockton
14:00 BST	Bell 70'	Report		Stadium: Bishopton Road West

9 November 2025 Second round	Middlesbrough	2–1 (a.e.t.)	Liverpool Feds	Stockton
14:00 GMT	Ferguson 75'; Giles 115'	Report	Fisher 88'	Stadium: Bishopton Road West

11 January 2026 Quarter-final	Burnley	3–0	Middlesbrough	Darwen
14:00 GMT	Docherty 2'; Chadwick 45', 50'	Report		Stadium: Anchor Ground

== Statistics ==
=== Appearances and goals ===
As of 26 April 2026

Starting appearances are listed first, followed by substitute appearances after the + symbol where applicable.

No.	Pos	Nat	Player	Total		NLN		FA Cup		WNL Cup	
No.	Pos	Nat	Player	Apps	Goals	Apps	Goals	Apps	Goals	Apps	Goals
Goalkeepers
1	GK	(England) ENG	Megan Borthwick	14	0	8	0	2+1	0	3	0
13	GK	(England) ENG	Ruby Cook	21	0	14+1	0	2	0	3+1	0
Defenders
3	DF	(England) ENG	Keira Skelton	19	0	5+7	0	1+1	0	1+4	0
4	DF	(England) ENG	Olivia Watt	29	3	20	2	3+1	1	5	0
5	DF	(England) ENG	Ellen Packham	30	1	20	0	4	0	6	1
6	DF	(England) ENG	Abby Towers	31	0	21+1	0	3	0	6	0
14	DF	(England) ENG	Emma Foster	13	0	2+5	0	1+1	0	0+4	0
15	DF	(England) ENG	Ella Baker	5	0	0+5	0	0	0	0	0
22	DF	(England) ENG	Grace Boyes	32	0	22	0	4	0	6	0
Midfielders
8	MF	(Northern Ireland) NIR	Emily Cassap	8	1	5+3	1	0	0	0	0
10	MF	(England) ENG	Lauren Robson	30	6	17+4	2	2+2	2	4+1	2
11	MF	(England) ENG	Leanna Giles	29	2	17+3	1	3	0	5+1	1
17	MF	(England) ENG	Millie Bell	30	2	15+5	1	3+1	0	4+2	1
18	MF	(England) ENG	Sarah Burn	30	2	18+3	1	4	0	5	1
21	MF	(England) ENG	Annie Mitchell	3	0	0+1	0	0+2	0	0	0
23	MF	(England) ENG	Chelsea Callander	5	0	0+1	0	0	0	0+4	0
Forwards
7	FW	(England) ENG	Ellen Turnbull	28	4	14+7	3	2+1	0	4	1
9	FW	(England) ENG	Armani Maxwell	32	9	20+2	8	3+1	1	5+1	0
12	FW	(England) ENG	Erin Nelson	22	2	3+10	0	2+1	1	3+3	1
16	FW	(England) ENG	Niyah Dunbar	6	1	0+4	1	1+1	0	0	0
19	FW	(England) ENG	Becky Ferguson	27	12	19	8	2	2	5+1	2
Players who appeared but left during the season
8	FW	(England) ENG	Jessica Mett	7	0	0+5	0	0	0	1+1	0
24	DF	(England) ENG	Abby Holmes	9	4	3+2	1	2+1	3	0+1	0

=== Goalscorers ===
Rank	No.	Nat.	Po.	Name	NLN	FA Cup	WNL Cup	Total
1	19	(England)	FW	Becky Ferguson	8	2	2	12
2	9	(England)	FW	Armani Maxwell	8	1	0	9
3	10	(England)	MF	Lauren Robson	2	2	2	6
4	7	(England)	FW	Ellen Turnbull	3	0	1	4
4	24	(England)	DF	Abby Homes	1	3	0	4
5	4	(England)	DF	Olivia Watt	2	1	0	3
6	11	(England)	MF	Leanna Giles	1	0	1	2
6	12	(England)	FW	Erin Nelson	0	1	1	2
6	17	(England)	MF	Millie Bell	1	0	1	2
6	18	(England)	MF	Sarah Burn	1	0	1	2
7	5	(England)	DF	Ellen Packham	0	0	1	1
7	8	(Northern Ireland)	MF	Emily Cassap	1	0	0	1
7	16	(England)	FW	Niyah Dunbar	1	0	0	1
Own goals					0	1	0	1
Total					29	11	10	50
