= Erin Bloomfield =

English footballer (born 2002)

Personal information
- Date of birth: 3 March 2002 (age 24)
- Place of birth: England
- Position: Forward

Team information
- Current team: Bristol Rovers
- Number: 18

Senior career*
Years	Team	Apps	(Gls)
2018-2019	Yeovil Town	12	(2)
2019-2020	Southampton Women's	10	(12)
2020-2023	Troy Trojans	47	(10)
2023	Southampton Women's	8	(5)
2023-2025	AFC Bournemouth	42	(31)
2025-	Bristol Rovers		
- * Club domestic league appearances and goals

Erin Bloomfield is an English footballer who plays as a forward for Bristol Rovers.

Bloomfield began her career at Yeovil Town and made her Women's Super League debut as a 16-year-old against Arsenal. She scored for Yeovil in a FA cup tie against Birmingham City, making her one of the youngest goal scorers in the FC cup proper rounds.

She joined Southampton Women's F.C. in October 2019 and had scored 12 goals in just ten games when the season was abandoned due to the COVID-19 pandemic.

Bloomfield then spent three years studying in the United States, turning out for Troy University, in this spell Bloomfield stood out in a struggling team, earning 'Sun Belt's Offensive Player of the Week' in her second season.

Following a return to English football Bloomfield, signed with her previous club Southampton, netting 3 in 7 games before being signed by division rivals AFC Bournemouth Women. She spent two seasons with Bournemouth, scoring 22 goals in 29 appearances, before signing for Bristol Rovers in the summer of 2025.
