= Kenni Thompson =

Bermudian footballer (born 2000)

Personal information
- Full name: Kenni Louise Tohmasia Thompson
- Date of birth: 1 December 2000 (age 25)
- Position: Forward

Team information
- Current team: AFC Bournemouth

International career
Years	Team	Apps	(Gls)
2023–	Bermuda	1	(0)

Kenni Louise Tohmasia Thompson (born 1 December 2000) is a Bermudian footballer who plays as a striker for AFC Bournemouth Women

== Early life ==
Thompson was born in Bermuda and enrolled in Saltus Grammar School.

== Youth career ==
As a youth player, Thompson received offers from Espanyol and Barcelona to join their youth academies, ending up joining the latter. She also played for the WOSPAC Academy for three years, which enabled her to train with the youth academy of Spanish side UE Cornellà. After that, she joined the youth academy of English side Chelsea.

== Senior club career ==
Thompson started her career with the reserves of Spanish side Espanyol, before being promoted to play for their first team.

In 2020, Thompson signed for Spanish side Deportivo de La Coruña, where she suffered injuries. She debuted for Deportivo de La Coruña against Real Sociedad. In 2022, she signed for English side London City Lionesses, where she scored one goal and recorded one assist during her first ten appearances for the club, playing as midfielder.

== International career ==
In 2014, Thompson participated in try-outs for the Spain under-16 women's national team.

== International goals ==
No.	Date	Venue	Opponent	Score	Result	Competition
1.	27 November 2025	Truman Bodden Sports Complex, George Town, Cayman Islands	Cayman Islands	2–0	4–0	2026 CONCACAF W Championship qualification
2.	18 April 2026	Dame Flora Duffy National Sports Centre, Devonshire Parish, Grenada	Grenada	4–3	5–3	2026 CONCACAF W Championship qualification

== Style of play ==
Thompson mainly operates as a winger but can operate in other positions. She is left-footed and is known for her shooting ability.

== Personal life ==
Thompson is the daughter of Bermudian footballer and manager Kenny Thompson.

== Honours ==
AFC Bournemouth

- FA Women's National League Cup: 2025–26
