= 2025–26 FA Women's National League Plate =

Tournament details
- Country: England; Wales
- Dates: 12 October 2025 – 29 March 2026
- Teams: 32

Final positions
- Champions: Cheadle Town Stingers (1st title)
- Runners-up: Moneyfields

Tournament statistics
- Matches played: 31
- Goals scored: 113 (3.65 per match)
- Top goal scorer(s): Ali Hall (Moneyfields) (4 goals)
- All statistics correct as of 29 March 2026.

The 2025–26 FA Women's National League Plate was the eleventh season of the competition, open to a ranked selection of teams eliminated from Women's National League Cup.

The 2025–26 season saw a change to the format of the League Cup, with the introduction of a group stage and entry of Professional Game Academy sides for the first time, the season after the Plate had started to include U21 sides. Teams were initially drawn into 22 groups of four teams who played each other once (not twice), and from which the 22 group winners and 10 best runners-up advanced to the Cup knockout stages. The other 12 runners-up, and 20 best third-placed teams advanced to the National League Plate knockout stages.

Reigning champions AFC Bournemouth Women placed in the top 32 teams in the group stages of the National League Cup, meaning that they did not defend their title.

== Results ==
All results are published by the Football Association. Games are first listed by group in chronological order, and then in alphabetical order of the home team where matches were played simultaneously.

== First Round ==
The draw for the first knockout round was made on 29 September 2025.

12 October 2025	Durham Cestria (N1)	2–0	Sheffield United U21 (PGA)	Sunderland
14:00 BST	Dale 9'; Forster 50'	Report		Stadium: Leisure United Ford

19 October 2025	Cambridge United (SE1)	3–4	London Bees (SE1)	St Neots
14:00 BST	Bell 52'; 55' (o.g.); Wood 61' (pen.)	Report	Isherwood 18', 51'; Fowle 20'; Flynn 34'	Stadium: Rowley Park; Attendance: 96

19 October 2025	Cheadle Town Stingers FC (N1)	1–0	Sheffield FC (MD1)	Cheadle
14:00 BST	Porteous-Williams 87'	Report		Stadium: Park Road Stadium; Attendance: 80

19 October 2025	Chesham United (SE1)	1–4	Ascot United (SW1)	Chesham
14:00 BST	Fitzgerald 26'	Report	21' (o.g.); Maxted 35'; Harney 38'; Lloyd 78'	Stadium: The Meadow

19 October 2025	Doncaster Rovers Belles (N1)	0–3	Birmingham City U21 (PGA)	Rotherham
14:00 BST		Report	Day 63'; Powis 68'; Fitzpatrick 87'	Stadium: Millmoor Stadium

19 October 2025	Gwalia United (S)	4–3 (a.e.t.)	Tottenham Hotspur U21 (PGA)	Pontypridd
14:00 BST	Gregson 63'; Walters 71'; Williams-Mills 75' (pen.)	Report	Hills 40', 85', 90'	Stadium: University of South Wales Sports Park

19 October 2025	Huddersfield Town (N1)	3–2	Loughborough Lightning (N)	Kirkburton
14:00 BST	Beresford 4'; Burgess 8'; Lord-Mears 28'	Report	Steggles 45+3'; Higginbottom 75'	Stadium: Stafflex Arena; Attendance: 57

19 October 2025	Luton Town (SE1)	2–3 (a.e.t.)	London City Lionesses U21 (PGA)	Barton-le-Clay
14:00 BST	Wilson 89'; Fensome 116'	Report	Kabo 27'; Gbajabiamila 95'; Hewson 110'	Stadium: Sharpenhoe Road; Attendance: 234

19 October 2025	Maidenhead United (SW1)	2–1	Bridgwater United (SW1)	Maidenhead
14:00 BST	Stockton 49'; Harper 90'	Report	Pengelly 65'	Stadium: York Road; Attendance: 40

19 October 2025	Moneyfields (SW1)	4–1	Bristol City U21 (PGA)	Portsmouth
14:00 BST	Hall 11', 33'; Scott 12'; Jeal 49'	Report	Law 15'	Stadium: The John Jenkins Stadium; Attendance: 47

19 October 2025	Northampton Town (MD1)	0–2	Norwich City (SE1)	Moulton
14:00 BST		Report	Densley 49'; Riglar 69'	Stadium: O'Riordan Bond Stadium

19 October 2025	Notts County (MD1)	3–2	Leicester City U21 (PGA)	Eastwood
14:00 BST	Brooks 30'; Hardy 33'; Barnes 64'	Report	Kaczmar 16'; Palmer 22'	Stadium: Coronation Park

19 October 2025	Stockport County (N1)	3–2 (a.e.t.)	Sunderland U21 (PGA)	Stockport
14:00 BST	Jein 3'; Cole 55'; Battle 113'	Report	West 23'; Forster 50'	Stadium: Stockport Sports Village; Attendance: 84

19 October 2025	Worcester City (MD1)	1–2	Halifax F.C. (N)	Worcester
14:00 BST	Edwards 58'	Report	Strickland 73'; Davenport 74'	Stadium: Sixways Stadium; Attendance: 113

22 October 2025	Bristol Rovers (SW1)	1–3	Brighton & Hove Albion U21 (PGA)	Yate
19:45 BST	Jarvis 55'	Report	Fergus 30', 33'; Hester 86'	Stadium: Lodge Road

26 October 2025	Chorley Women FC (N1)	2–1	Aston Villa U21 (PGA)	Euxton
14:00 BST	Ellinson; Gunn	Report	Curnyn 65'	Stadium: Jim Fowler Memorial Ground
Note: Match was originally played on 19 October 2025, but was abandoned following a serious injury to an Aston Villa PGA player.

== Second Round ==
The draw for the second knockout round was made on 20 October 2025.

9 November 2025	Ascot United (SW1)	0–2	London City Lionesses U21 (PGA)	Ascot
14:00 GMT		Report	Loom 26'; Walsh 57' (pen.)	Stadium: Ascot Racecourse; Attendance: 87

9 November 2025	Chorley Women FC (N1)	4–0	Notts County (MD1)	Euxton
14:00 GMT	Hamer-Brown; Searson; Worthington	Report		Stadium: Jim Fowler Memorial Ground; Attendance: 159

9 November 2025	Gwalia United (S)	3–2	London Bees (SE1)	Pontypridd
14:00 GMT	Asker 5'; Williams-Mills 6'; O'Keefe 66'	Report	Larkin 16', 90'	Stadium: University of South Wales Sports Park; Attendance: 147

9 November 2025	Cheadle Town Stingers FC (N1)	2–1	Huddersfield Town (N1)	Cheadle
14:00 GMT	Porteous-Williams 75' (pen.), 85'	Report	Jones 68'	Stadium: Park Road Stadium; Attendance: 81

9 November 2025	Halifax F.C. (N)	3–1	Birmingham City U21 (PGA)	Bradford
14:00 GMT	Crompton 45+4', 63'; Phillips 75'	Report	90+3'	Stadium: Myra Shay Park; Attendance: 90

9 November 2025	Maidenhead United (SW1)	2–2 (a.e.t.) (3–5 p)	Moneyfields (SW1)	Maidenhead
14:00 GMT	Harper 13'; Stockton 56'	Report	Phelps 23'; Hall 60'	Stadium: York Road (Maidenhead)
	Penalties
	Akerman (penalty scored); Evans (penalty scored); Baksh (penalty missed); Stockton (penalty scored)		Granger (penalty scored); Beard (penalty scored); Haughton (penalty scored); Hall (penalty scored); Fox (penalty scored)

9 November 2025	Norwich City (SE1)	1–2	Brighton & Hove Albion U21 (PGA)	Horsford
14:00 GMT	Moore 9'	Report	Martin 4', 37'	Stadium: The Nest; Attendance: 308; Referee: Ellis Lander

9 November 2025	Stockport County (N1)	1–2	Durham Cestria (N1)	Stockport
14:00 GMT	Watson 78'	Report	Mathais 88', 90+3'	Stadium: Stockport Sports Village; Attendance: 82

== Quarter-finals ==
11 January 2026	Gwalia United (S)	2–0	Brighton & Hove Albion U21 (PGA)	Pontypridd
14:00 GMT	Walters 31'; Asker 65'	Report		Stadium: University of South Wales Sports Park; Attendance: 240

11 January 2026	Moneyfields (SW1)	6–1	London City Lionesses U21 (PGA)	Portsmouth
14:00 GMT	Simmonds 14'; Howden 43'; Fox 56', 90'; Albuery 70'; Hall 73'	Report	Kabo 39'	Stadium: The John Jenkins Stadium; Attendance: 87

25 January 2026	Cheadle Town Stingers FC (N1)	2–0	Durham Cestria (N1)	Cheadle
14:00 GMT	Bentley 18'; Weston 87'	Report		Stadium: Park Road Stadium; Attendance: 58

25 January 2026	Halifax F.C. (N)	4–1	Chorley Women FC (N1)	Bradford
14:00 GMT	Shaw 26', 41'; Hollin 61', 90'	Report	Embley 87'	Stadium: Myra Shay Park; Attendance: 125

== Semi-finals ==
1 February 2026	Cheadle Town Stingers (N1)	2–0	Halifax F.C. (N)	Cheadle
14:00 GMT	Bentley 3'; Coe 81'	Report		Stadium: Ground Up Solutions Stadium; Attendance: 121

1 February 2026	Moneyfields (SW1)	2–0	Gwalia United (S)	Portsmouth
14:00 GMT	Albuery 8'; Garcia 16'	Report		Stadium: The John Jenkins Stadium; Attendance: 76

== Final ==
29 March 2026	Cheadle Town Stingers (N1)	0–0 (3–0 p)	Moneyfields (SW1)	Slough
14:00 GMT		Report		Stadium: Arbour Park; Attendance: 307
