= Kelci-Rose Bowers =

English association football player and model (born 2004)

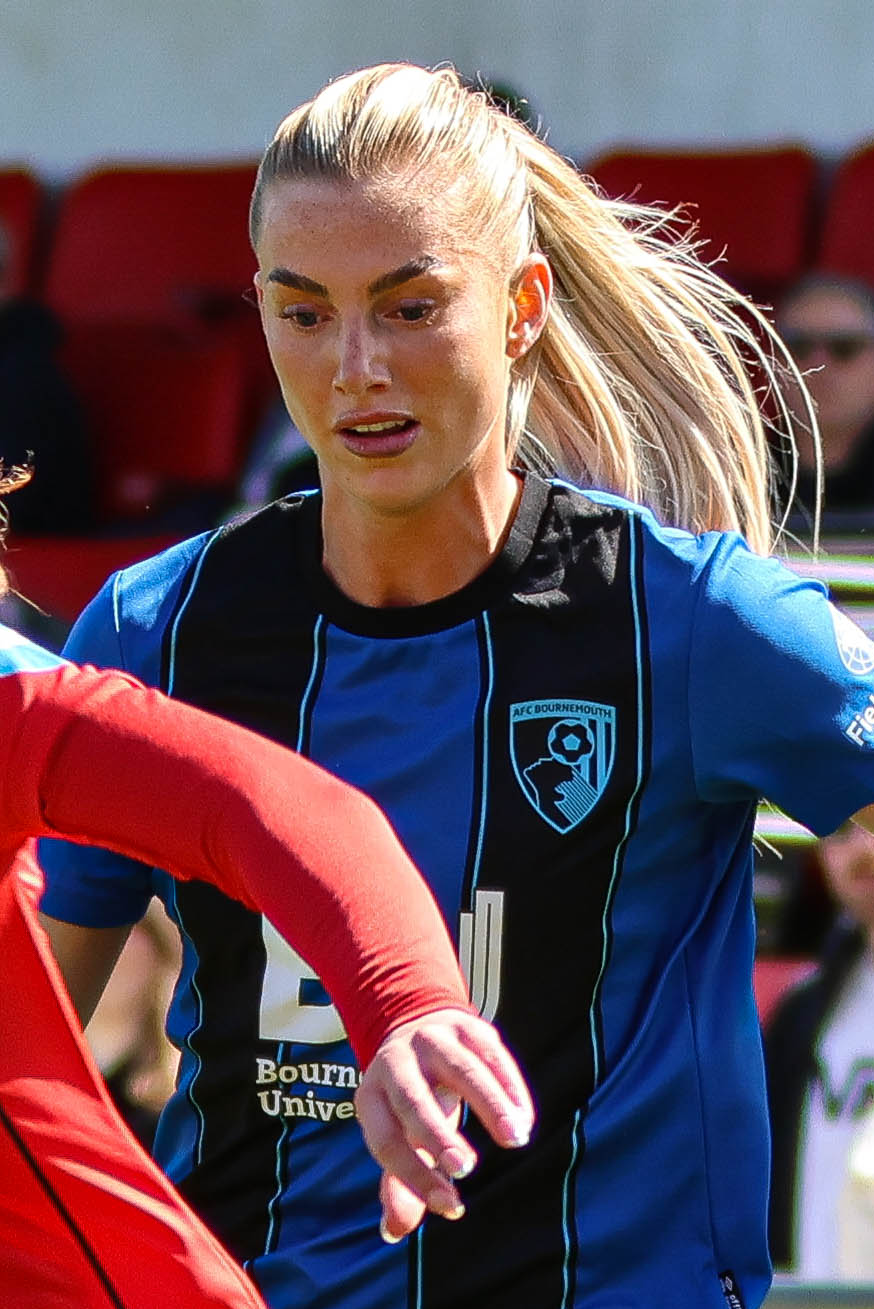
- Bowers playing for Bournemouth in 2026

Personal information
- Full name: Kelci-Rose Bowers
- Date of birth: 21 January 2004 (age 22)
- Place of birth: Fareham, England
- Height: 1.70 m (5 ft 7 in)
- Position: Defender

Team information
- Current team: Real Bedford Women
- Number: 8

Youth career
- Chelsea
- Southampton

College career
Years	Team	Apps	(Gls)
2022	LSU Tigers	7	(0)

Senior career*
Years	Team	Apps	(Gls)
2023–2024	Portsmouth		
2024	→ AFC Bournemouth (loan)		
2024–2026	AFC Bournemouth		
2026–2026	Hashtag United		
2026–	Real Bedford		

International career^{‡}
- England U15
- England U19
- * Club domestic league appearances and goals as of 4 August 2026 ‡ National team caps and goals as of 4 August 2026

Kelci-Rose Bowers

Instagram information
- Page: Kelci-Rose
- Years active: 2021-
- Followers: 356,408 (5 August 2026)

Kelci-Rose Bowers (born 21 January 2004), also known as Kelci Bowers, is an English professional footballer, model, and influencer, who plays as a defender for FA Women's National League club Hashtag United.

Bowers progressed through the youth academies of Chelsea and Southampton before playing college soccer in the United States for the LSU Tigers in 2022. After appearing in seven matches at LSU, she returned to England to join Portsmouth in 2023, later moving to AFC Bournemouth, initially on loan in March 2024 and joining on a permanent transfer later that year. In August 2026, she joined Hashtag United following the expiry of her contract at Bournemouth.

A native of Fareham, Bowers has represented England internationally at youth levels, from under-15 through under-19.

The social media video announcing her 2024 signing with Bournemouth was viewed by 22 million viewers. Also in 2024, she began a relationship with Argentine footballer Marcos Senesi, who played for Bournemouth's men's team at the time. Her move to the London-based Hashtag United follows Senesi's transfer to Tottenham Hotspur, also in London. As of June 2026, Bowers had over 200,000 social media followers.
