= Bristol Rovers W.F.C. =

- Full name: Bristol Rovers Women's Football Club
- Nickname: Gas Girls
- Founded: 2019
- Ground: Memorial Stadium (primary); Lodge Road, Yate (secondary)
- Coordinates: 51.4968°N 2.5662°W
- Chairman: Hussain AlSaeed
- Manager: Nathan Hallett-Young
- League: FA Women's National League Division One South West
- 2025–26: FA Women's National League Division One South West, 4th of 12
- Website: Bristol Rovers Women
| Home colours | Away colours |

Bristol Rovers W.F.C. are a women's association football club based in Bristol that plays in the FA Women's National League Division One South West. They are affiliated to Bristol Rovers F.C. and are known colloquially as the Gas Girls in recognition of Bristol Rovers' unofficial nickname of The Gas.

== History ==
Bristol Rovers Football Club launched their original women's team in 1998, and although they were successful (rising from the South West Combination to the top flight of women's football in England within five years) the financial situation within the football club in the mid-2000s led to the funding for the women's team being cut and them being renamed Bristol Academy W.F.C. in 2005, eventually being re-branded again as Bristol City in 2016.

In 2019, fourteen years after the name disappeared from women's football, it was announced that a new Bristol Rovers Women's team was being launched in time for the 2019–20 season and that they would be playing in the Gloucestershire County Women's Football League. The launch of the new Bristol Rovers Women's Team was Co-Founded by Club Secretary & Media Manager, Matthew Davies and First-Team Manager, Nathan Hallett-Young. The first team was eventually accepted into Division One of the Gloucestershire League and the development team was granted a place in Division Two and a new logo was commissioned, based on the Bristol Rovers club badge and featuring a female pirate. They play their home games at Lockleaze Sports Centre in the Lockleaze area of Bristol, and are funded by the Bristol Rovers Community Trust.

The first team played their first competitive match on 8 September 2019, a 5–0 win away to Abbeymead Rovers.

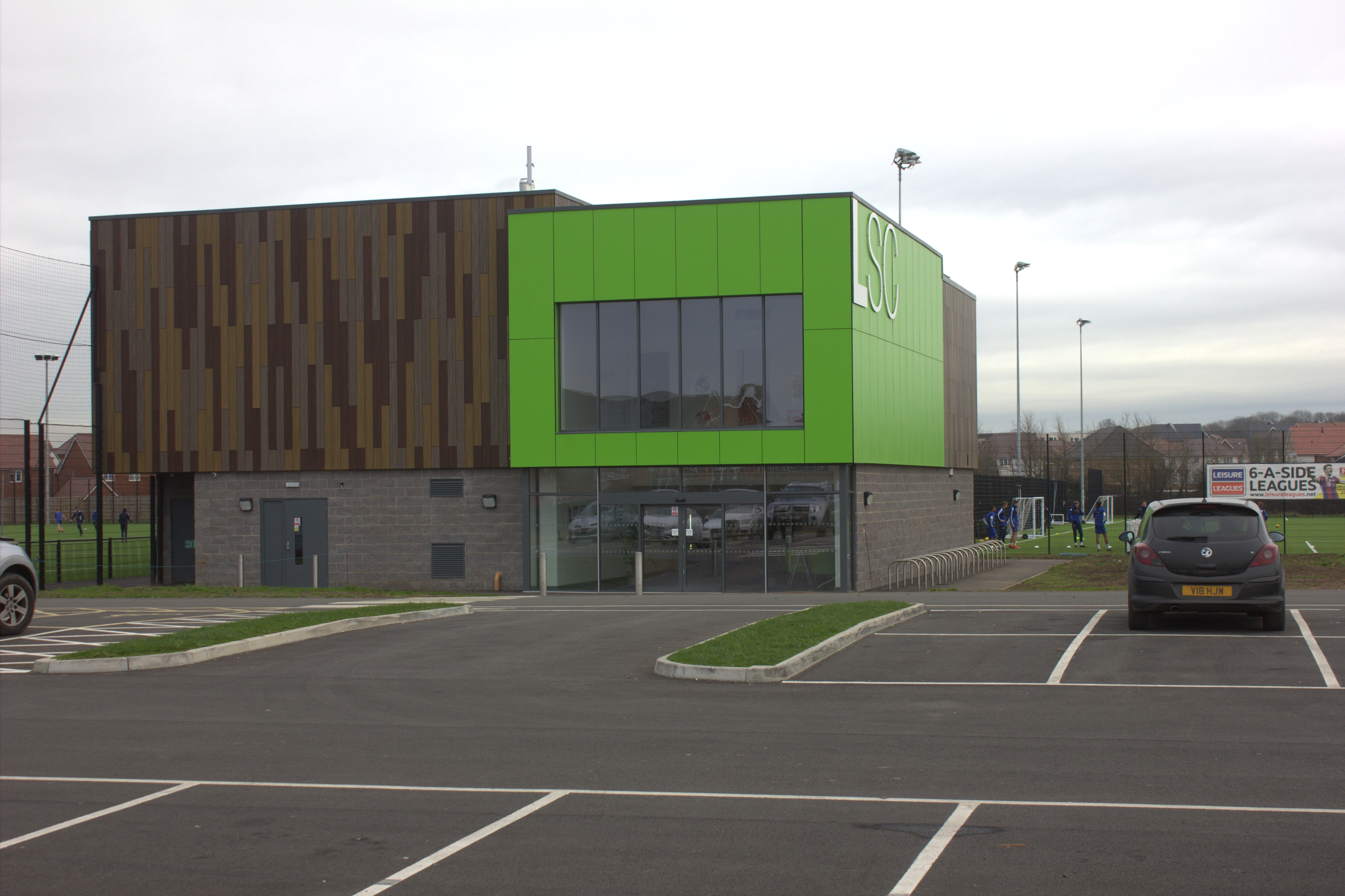
Lockleaze Sports Centre, their home ground from 2019 until 2024

The 'Gas Girls' pride themselves on their four key values (Community, Education, Participation & Performance). In its first year, the club was awarded the 'Best Community Football Development Initiative Award' at the 2020 FA Women's & Girls Football Awards. In September 2020, the club also announced a community partnership with Bristol Pride and launched a special edition away shirt. This shirt was later inducted into the National Football Museum collection after being rated the ninth best shirt for the 2020–21 season by the museum who also named it the bespoke women's away shirt of the season.

After being top of the league in their first season when the season was annulled on account of the COVID-19 pandemic, in their second season the 'Gas Girls' were crowned champions. On 4 June 2021, it was confirmed that the FA had accepted the club's application for promotion to South West Regional Women's Football League Division One. On 13 February 2022, the club secured back-to-back promotions after a 4–0 victory over Weston Mendip Ladies with the 'Gas Girls' having needed only a point to win the title. This success was followed up seven weeks later when a 4–2 victory for the Development Squad saw them clinch the Gloucestershire County Women's League Division Two title.

The 'Gas Girls' campaign for Women's football and support for HerGameToo was encapsulated when Bristol Rovers Women played Forest Green Rovers Ladies for at The Memorial Stadium. The game took place after the men's edition of the fixture. Tickets bought for the men's game included a free ticket for the Women's game in an attempt to increase interest. The result was a resounding success, the score ended 3-1 to the 'Gas Girls' and was played in front of a crowd of 2,247.

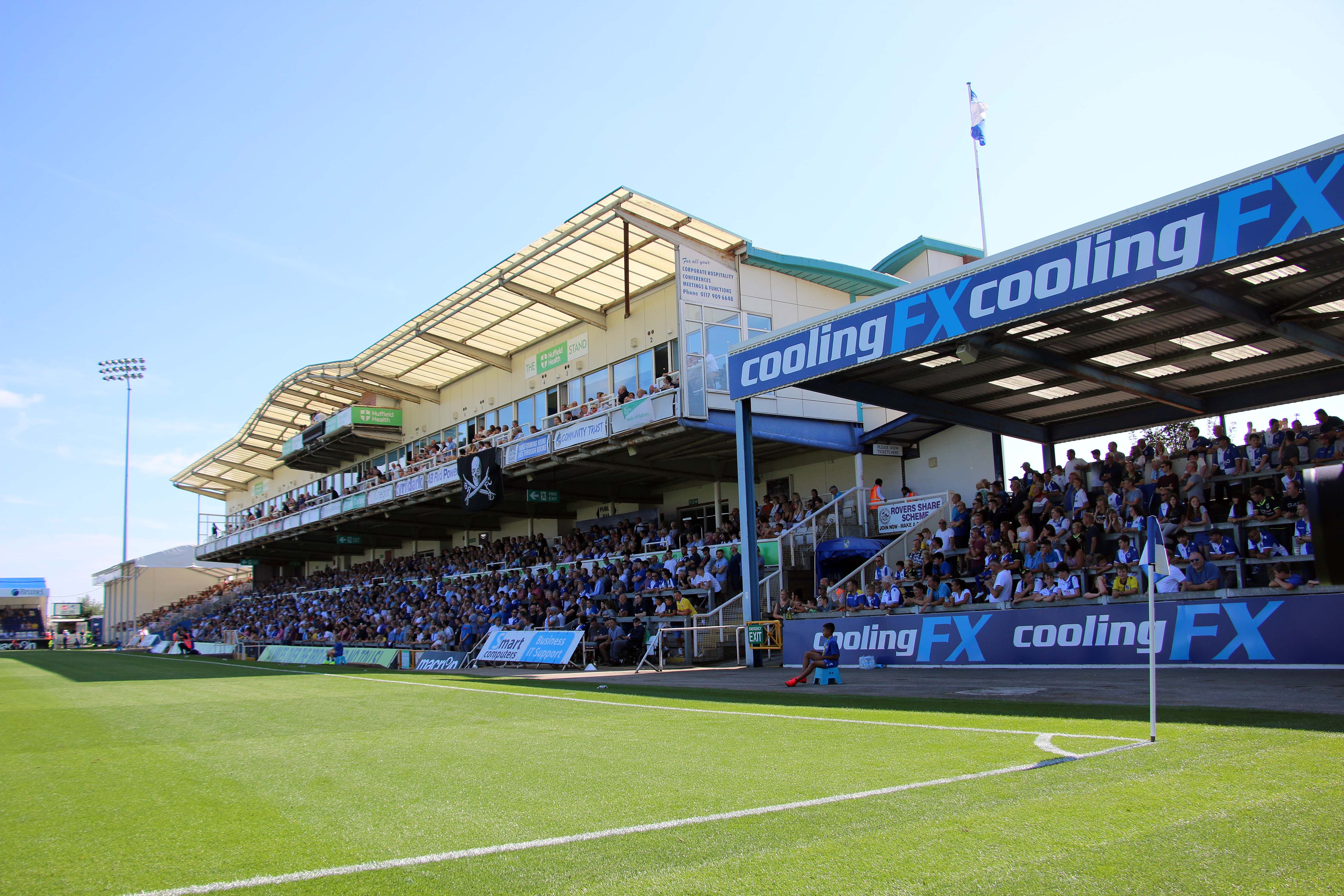
The Memorial Stadium, the club's home ground since 2024

Although they were denied promotion in the 2022–23 season, the Gas Girls won their first cup competition as a club, lifting the South West Premier League Cup in May 2023. The following season, the club were crowned champions with two matches remaining, earning promotion to the National League. Following this, it was announced that the club would be brought under the same management as the men's team and, from the 24/25 season, matches would be played at the Memorial Stadium.

=== Season by season ===
| Season | League | | | | | | | | FA Cup | League cup | County Trophy/Cup | Top scorer | | Manager |
| Season | Division | Position | W | D | L | F | A | Pts | FA Cup | League cup | County Trophy/Cup | League only | All matches | Manager |
|---|---|---|---|---|---|---|---|---|---|---|---|---|---|---|
| 2019–20 | Gloucestershire League First Division | N/A (Note: The 2019–20 season was abandoned due to the COVID-19 pandemic. Results of matches and player records still stand for the season, but the league tables were annulled.) | 11 | 0 | 0 | 45 | 6 | 33 | Not entered | Semi-final (Note: Rovers had reached the semi-final of the Gordon Perrett League Cup in 2019–20 when the season was suspended. The match, which was due to be against Pucklechurch Sports, was never played.) | Second round | Rossana Rocha (10) | Georgia Vandries (17) | Nathan Hallett-Young |
| 2020–21 | Gloucestershire League First Division | 1st | 5 | 1 | 0 | 32 | 1 | 16 | Round 1Q | Cancelled | Cancelled (Note: The Gloucestershire County FA elected not to hold any county cup competitions in the 2020–21 season due to the ongoing effects of the COVID-19 pandemic.) | Georgia Vandries (11) | Georgia Vandries (11) | Nathan Hallett-Young |
| 2021–22 | SWRWFL Northern Division | 1st | 14 | 1 | 1 | 77 | 12 | 43 | Round 1Q | N/A | Quarter-Final (Note: Withdrew from the Gloucestershire Women's Trophy at the quarter-final stage due to a COVID-19 outbreak in the squad) | Zoe Fielden-Stewart (19) | Zoe Fielden-Stewart (19) | Nathan Hallett-Young |
| 2022–23 | SWRWFL Premier Division | 2nd | 13 | 3 | 2 | 59 | 23 | 42 | Round 3Q | Winners | Second Round | Abigail Todd (22) | Abigail Todd (26) | Nathan Hallett-Young |
| 2023–24 | SWRWFL Premier Division | 1st | 14 | 1 | 1 | 55 | 13 | 43 | Round 2 | Runners-up | Not entered | Laura Curnock (15) | Laura Curnock (16) | Nathan Hallett-Young |
| 2024–25 | FAWNL Division One South West | 4th | 14 | 1 | 7 | 40 | 25 | 43 | Round 4 | Cup: Determining Round; Plate: Preliminary round | Not entered | Meg Jarvis (13) | Meg Jarvis (22) | Nathan Hallett-Young |
| 2025–26 | FAWNL Division One South West | 4th | 13 | 4 | 5 | 56 | 23 | 43 | Round 2 | Cup: Group; Plate:Round 1 | Winners | Meg Jarvis (12) | Meg Jarvis (17) | Nathan Hallett-Young |

== Honours ==
=== First team ===
Leagues

- SWRWFL Premier Division: Champions: 1

2023–24

- SWRWFL Northern Division: Champions: 1

2021–22

- Gloucestershire League First Division: Champions: 1

2020–21

Cups

- South West Premier League Cup: Champions: 1

2022–23

=== Development squad ===
Leagues

- Gloucestershire League Second Division: Champions: 1

2021–22
