= Park Road Stadium =

Football stadium in Cheadle, England

Coordinates: 53.39216°N 2.20338°W

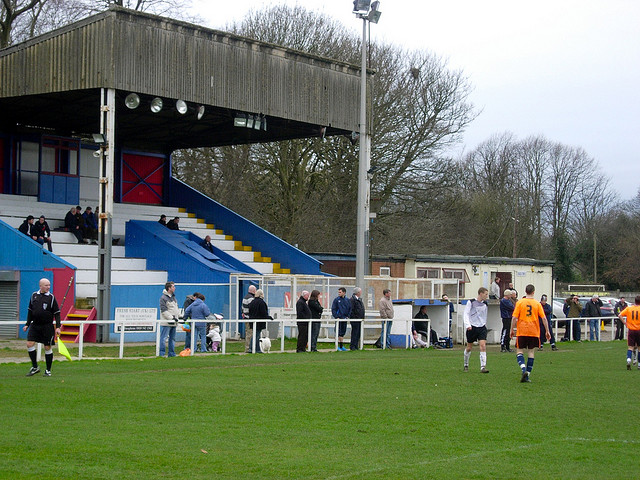
Main stand at Park Road

The Ground Up Solutions Stadium (formerly Park Road Stadium) is an association football stadium in Cheadle, Stockport, England. It is the home ground of North West Counties Football League club Cheadle Town F.C. and FA Women's National League club Cheadle Town Stingers. It has a capacity of 1,200 people, with 100 seated.

== History ==
The Ground Up Solutions Stadium (formerly Park Road Stadium) was constructed in the 1950s as the training ground for Manchester City. The ground is owned by Stockport Metropolitan Borough Council. During the 1966 FIFA World Cup, it was the training camp location for the Portugal national football team. In 1982, Manchester City ceded the lease of Park Road to Grasmere Rovers (who would be renamed Cheadle Town a year later). In 1993, it was used as the base for a football training school run by the Brazil national football team winger Jairzinho. In 1995, floodlights were installed for the first time and this was commemorated with an opening match between Cheadle Town and Manchester United.

In 2005, Cheadle Town moved their 2005–06 North West Counties Football League Division Two home match against F.C. United of Manchester from Park Road to Stockport County's Edgeley Park in Stockport due to crowd numbers. They also moved their North West Counties Football League Challenge Cup match against F.C. United from Park Road to Curzon Ashton's Tameside Stadium due to Stockport Council's heath and safety officer insisting Park Road was unsafe to host the numbers and after Sale Sharks rugby union team vetoed them using Edgeley Park again.

During the 2012–13 season, Park Road was subject to a spate of vandalism. Pre-season, vandals had torn wood off the back of the main stand and destroyed the CCTV system. In January the ground was subject to an arson attack but did not cause any damage to the pitch.
