= FA Women's National League Plate =

- Founded: 2014; 12 years ago
- Region: England
- Teams: 36
- Current champions: Cheadle Town Stingers (1st title)
- Most championships: Bournemouth, Cheadle Town Stingers, Coventry United, Derby County, Leeds United, Lewes, Nottingham Forest, Preston North End, West Bromwich Albion, & West Ham United (1 title each)
- 2026–27 WNL Plate

The FA Women's National League Plate is an association football tournament organised by the FA Women's National League (WNL). It is the WNL's second league cup competition, played alongside the National League Cup, and is a single-elimination knock-out tournament.

== History ==
The WPL Plate was introduced in 2014 following a restructuring of women's football in England. Historically, the WPL had consisted of three divisions: a National Division at the top, with two regional divisions, North and South, below. The WPL was the top level of women's football in England until the introduction of the Women's Super League in 2011, then in 2014 WSL 2 was also inserted above the WPL in the league structure. This led to the National Division being abolished and the former Combination Leagues, which had been below the WPL in the pyramid, were incorporated as four regional divisions one level below the North and South. This meant the number of divisions in the Women's National League had doubled from three to six, so a second cup competition was added to complement the existing National League Cup.

== Structure ==
The teams competing in each season's Women's National League Plate is decided by the first round of the WPL Cup, which is known as the Determining Round. All 72 WPL teams are drawn in this round, with the winners of each match continuing in the Cup and the losers being entered into the Plate.

As there are 36 losing teams in the determining round, a preliminary round of the Plate is held between a small number of teams to bring the number of participants down to 32, allowing a normal knock-out tournament to be held. The winners of each game proceed to the next stage, while the losers are eliminated from the tournament. All games are played over a single leg, with draws being settled by extra time and penalty kicks where required, and the final is held at a neutral venue.

== List of finals ==
Season	Winner	Score	Runner-up	Venue	Notes
2014–15	Preston North End (N)	3–0	Huddersfield Town (N)	Nethermoor Park, Guiseley	
2015–16	Coventry United (S)	5–1	Enfield Town (SE1)	Keys Park, Hednesford	
2016–17	Lewes (S)	4–0	Huddersfield Town (N)	St James Park, Brackley	
2017–18	West Ham United (S)	5–0	Luton Town (SE1)	Keys Park, Hednesford	
2018–19	West Bromwich Albion (M1)	5–1	Liverpool Feds (N1)	Butlin Road, Rugby	
2019–20	Watford (S) and West Bromwich Albion (N) qualified for the final, before it was cancelled due to the COVID-19 pandemic.				
2020–21	Competition cancelled due to the COVID-19 pandemic.				
2021–22	Nottingham Forest (N)	2–1	AFC Wimbledon (SE1)	Damson Park, Solihull	
2022–23	Leeds United (N1)	3–1	Stourbridge (M1)	Damson Park, Solihull	
2023–24	Derby County (N)	3–0	Cambridge United (SE1)	Broadhurst Park, Manchester	
2024–25	Bournemouth (SW1)	3–2	Cheltenham Town (S)	Court Place Farm, Marston	
2025–26	Cheadle Town Stingers (N1)	0–0(AET) (3–0 pens.)	Moneyfields (SW1)	Arbour Park, Slough	

(N)=Team played in Northern Division, (S)=Played in Southern Division, (M1)=Played in Midlands Division One, (N1)=Played in Northern Division One, (SE1)=Played in South East Division One, (SW1)=Played in South West Division One
