= County Ground (Leyland) =

Football stadium in Lancashire, England

The County Ground
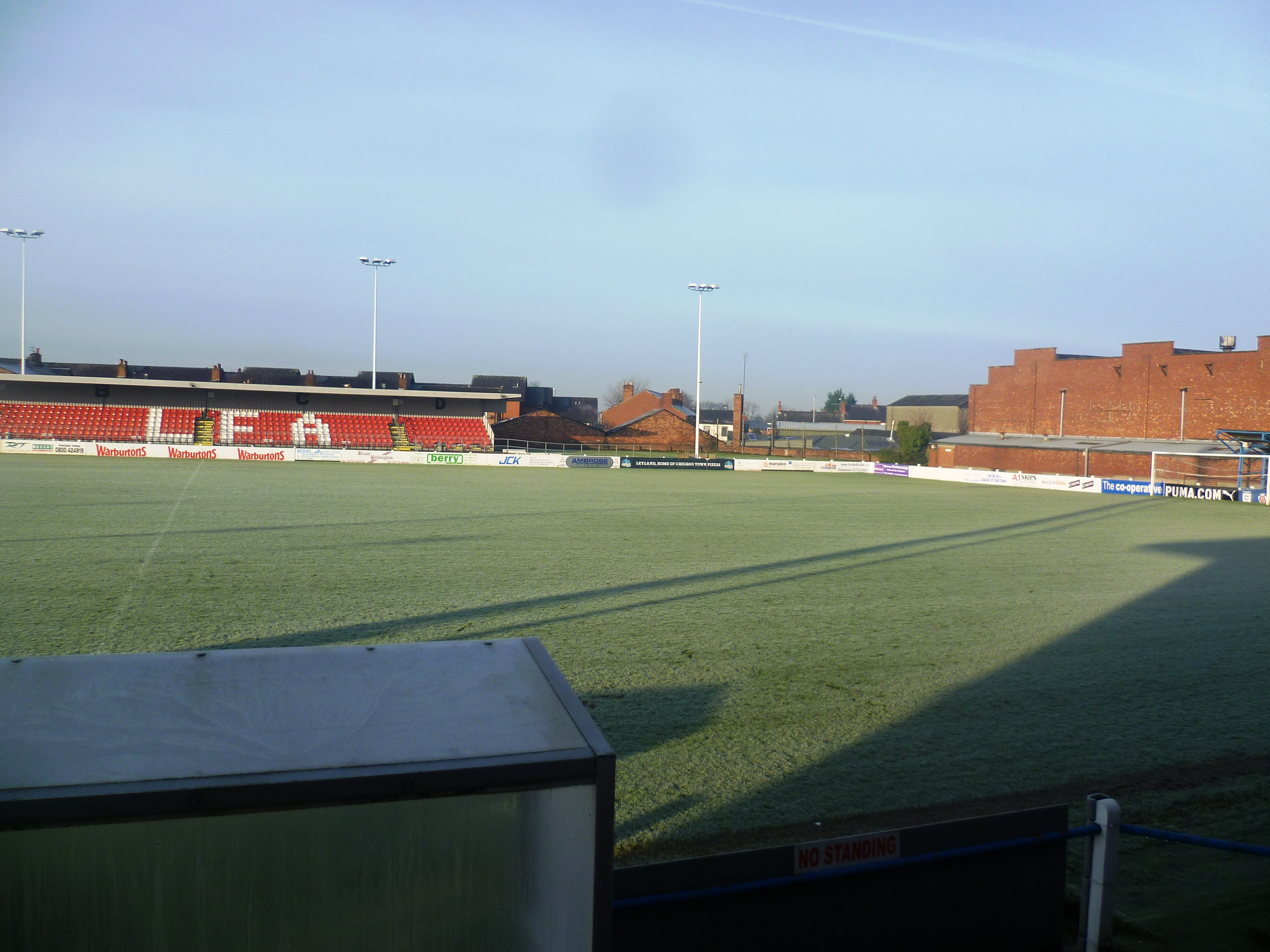
- View towards the stands

- Location in the Borough of South Ribble
- Full name: The County Ground
- Location: Thurston Road, Leyland; Lancashire PR25 2LF
- Coordinates: 53°41′35″N 2°41′40″W
- Owner: Lancashire County Football Association
- Capacity: ~2,300
- Surface: Grass

Construction
- Opened: 19??

Tenants
- Leyland Motors Bolton Wanderers reserves LFA representative team LFA youth team Blackburn Rovers F.C. Under-21s: 1933–2001; 200?–present 1998–present 1998–present 2016–present

The County Ground is a football stadium in Leyland, Lancashire, England, which is owned and operated by Lancashire County Football Association (Lancashire FA). It is the home ground of Burnley under-21s, Blackburn Rovers under-21s, Bolton Wanderers reserves and both the Lancashire FA representative team and the Lancashire FA youth team.

== History ==
The County Ground is located next to the Motor Vehicle Museum and was originally home to Leyland Motors FC who played in the Lancashire Combination from 1933 until 1980 when they joined the Cheshire County League, where they played for two seasons, before becoming founder members of the North West Counties Football League in 1982. In 1990 they changed name to Leyland DAF-SGL and in 1992 were demoted to the West Lancashire Football League, before another name change to Leyland Motors Athletic in 1993. In 2001 they left the league altogether.

The Lancashire FA moved their headquarters to the County Ground in 1998 from Blackburn.

The County Ground is the current home of Bolton Wanderers reserve team, who play in the Premier Reserve League and who, in the 2008-09 season, play in the North Division. The club also uses the ground for all their home matches in the Manchester Senior Cup.

The County Ground is also the current home of the Blackburn Rovers Under-21s team, who play in the Premier League 2.

Both the Lancashire FA representative team and the counties youth team play their home matches at the County Ground. The Lancashire FA currently organises nineteen County Cups and the final of each competition is played at the County Ground. It is also the headquarters of the Lancashire FA.

== Facilities ==
The stadium has a 500-seater covered stand with "LFA" imprinted in white lettering on the seats. The offices of the Lancashire FA are located at the ground which also has six corporate rooms. There is also one full size artificial 3G sports pitch and a smaller 7v7 3G sports pitch that are used for training and community use, these artificial sports pitches are maintained by Global Maintenance Ltd and Lancashire FA Grounds Team that are also based on site.
