= AFC Bournemouth Women =

Women's football club in Dorset, England

AFC Bournemouth
- Full name: AFC Bournemouth Women (Note: The full name of the club is AFC Bournemouth, without expansion.)
- Nickname: The Cherries
- Founded: 1992; 34 years ago as Bournemouth
- Ground: Bob Lucas Stadium
- Capacity: 6,600 (900 seated)
- Chairman: Bill Foley
- Manager: Helen Bleazard
- League: FA Women's National League South
- 2025–26: FA Women's National League South, 3rd of 12
- Website: afcb.co.uk/women
Home colours	Away colours	Third colours

AFC Bournemouth Women (/ˈbɔːrnməθ/ BORN-məth), commonly referred to as just Bournemouth, is an English semi-professional women's football club based in Dorset, England. The club plays in the FA Women's National League, Southern Premier Division, the third tier of English women's football, after winning promotion in the 2024–25 season.

In Summer 2023, control of AFC Bournemouth women's team transferred from the AFC Bournemouth Community Sports Trust (CST) to AFC Bournemouth Ltd - the main club company. In June 2025, AFC Bournemouth Women Limited was incorporated as a separate company in the Black Knight Football Club Group.

== History ==
=== Early history ===
Bournemouth won the 2003–04 Southern Region Division One. The club achieved a league and cup double for the 2005–06 season, winning the Southern Region Premier Division, and beating Slough Town 3–1 in the final of the Southern Region League Cup. The club reached the final of the 2007–08 South West Combination League Cup, but were beaten 4–1 by Plymouth Argyle. Bournemouth were forced to withdraw from the league due to financial problems, and lack of managerial staff. The club ultimately folded in March 2009.

=== National League ===
Bournemouth had reformed by 2012, playing in the Hampshire County Football League. The club achieved successive promotions, winning the 2014–15 Hampshire County Division Three, and the 2015–16 Hampshire County Division Two. Manager Steve Davies left the club in 2019, with Bournemouth appointing Steve Cuss as manager ahead of the 2019–20 season. The club successfully applied for promotion to the FA Women's National League Division One South West for the 2021–22 season. Bournemouth made their competitive debut at Dean Court on 10 April 2022, in a 4–1 win against Chesham United.

The 2023–24 season saw the players move to a semi-professional status. The season itself came to a dramatic end, as the last match of the season between Bournemouth and Exeter City would decide which of the two teams would be promoted. Exeter City chose to play the match in the familiar surroundings of the Exwick Sports Hub, their regular home venue and not at the main St James Park stadium, despite high interest in the match causing tickets to sell out. Bournemouth could only manage a 1–1 draw, which saw Exeter City promoted as champions. Despite not winning promotion, Bournemouth remained unbeaten in the league having last lost a league match against Cardiff City on 5th March 2023, in the previous season.

AFC Bournemouth Women

The 2024–25 season was eventually the team's most successful on record. The team lost the Determining Round match in the WNL to Moneyfields. However, their 18th successive league game and 18th league win in a row saw them confirmed as champions and promoted to The Southern Premier Division in a match at Dean Court in front of over 7,000 fans. Drawing only one subsequent league match made it the second successive season unbeaten in the league. A strong defensive performance also saw them not concede a goal for over 1,000 minutes and assisted goalkeeper Erin Foley in winning the Golden Glove award. In attack, striker Jenna Markham won the Golden Boot award. The team also won the National League Plate Trophy and narrowly missed out on a third trophy, finishing runners up in The Hampshire Senior Cup just 3 days later.

Prior to the start of the 2025–26 season, Steve Cuss stepped down from his dual role of Team Manager and Head of the Community Support Trust, to concentrate on just the CST role. Helen Bleazard, was initially appointed Interim Manager, then confirmed as Manager after a successful start to the season that saw her nominated as manager of the month and the team top of the division with 4 league games played. The team’s unbeaten run in the league continued until 18 February 2026 when they lost 1–0 away to Oxford in a rainswept evening kick off. It was an unbeaten run of 60 games, 1,081 days and covered two full seasons. Despite the loss they remained in contention for a promotion place at the end of the season. Ultimately, their promotion push fell short, the team finished in 3rd place in the league. They did however win the FA WNL Cup for first time in their history.

The club switched the home venue for the team to the Bob Lucas Stadium in Weymouth, West Dorset for the 2026-27 season. This proved controversial with the fans, many saying they would not be able to watch the team, due to the travelling involved. The club subsequently stated that all matches (home and away) would be free to stream live on ‘AFCBTV’, on the club website.

== Stadium ==
For the 2026-27 season, Bournemouth switched their home stadium to be the Bob Lucas Stadium in Weymouth in the far West of Dorset. It is a shared facility used by both the men's and women's team of Weymouth F.C.

In previous seasons Bournemouth normally played their home games at The Ringwood Community Hub, Ringwood. This is a shared facility with Ringwood Town F.C. It has been retained for use by the Development Team, who still use its 3G pitch.

The Ringwood Community Hub underwent a major upgrade to the facilities following an investment of £3.4 million by the New Forest District Council, Ringwood Town Council, Ringwood and District Round Table, AFC Bournemouth Community Sports Trust and the Football Foundation.

New floodlights were installed on the main grass pitch. An artificial turf 3G pitch opened in February 2023 and was used for training, or if the main pitch was unavailable, but is now used by the Development Team.

Work started on the new pavilion clubhouse in June 2023. The first game AFC Bournemouth Women played using the new pavilion was on Sunday 13 October 2024 against Bishops Lydeard Ladies AFC in the 3rd round qualifying match of the FA Cup. Although the formal opening of the pavilion, by the leader of the New Forest District Council, took place the following month.

The old Ringwood Town FC clubhouse was subsequently demolished.

Since 2022, the club also play select matches at Dean Court:

Date	Opposition	Result	Attendance
10 Apr 2022	Chesham United	W 4–1	1,592
16 Apr 2023	Maidenhead	D 0–0	3,067
5 Nov 2023	Portishead Town	W 4–0	6,805
10 Dec 2023	Charlton Athletic (FA Cup)	L 0–6	1,450
24 Mar 2024	Keynsham Town	D 1–1	6,162
10 Nov 2024	Swindon Town	W 4–0	6,054
23 Mar 2025	Bristol Rovers	W 2–0	7,076
29 Oct 2025	Oxford United	W 2–1	5,850
12 Apr 2026	Real Bedford	L 1–2	5,370
27 Sep 2026	Southampton PGA	W 9–0	6,480

== Current squad ==
As of 5 August 2026

=== Most recent squad changes ===
Added academy players that have made their first team debuts, but who are not listed on the club website yet.

Note: Flags indicate national team as defined under FIFA eligibility rules; some limited exceptions apply. Players may hold more than one non-FIFA nationality.

No.	Pos.	Nation	Player
1	GK	ENG	Katie Scadding
2	DF	ENG	Abby Jones (Captain)
3	DF	ENG	Tilly Wilkes
4	DF	ENG	Scarlett Williams
5	DF	IRL	Sophia Leonard
6	DF	ENG	Freya Meadows Tuson
7	FW	ENG	Issy Bryant
8	MF	ENG	Kyra Robertson
9	FW	ENG	Jenna Markham
10	MF	ENG	Georgia Wilson
11	FW	ENG	Tia Young
14	MF	ENG	Katie James

No.	Pos.	Nation	Player
15	MF	WAL	Elena Cole
16	FW	ENG	Clarabella Hall
18	MF	ENG	Emilia Newton
20	MF	ENG	Tamara Wilcock
21	GK	ENG	Ella Stowell
22	MF	ENG	Mia Hammick
23	MF	ENG	Tilly Westcott
24	DF	ENG	Caitlin Smith
25	MF	ENG	Isla Betts
26	DF	ENG	Anya Lucas
27	DF	ENG	Issy Watts
28	DF	ENG	Charlotte Harris

=== Dual registration loan ===
Dual registration loans allow young players from higher tier level clubs to gain senior team experience at lower league clubs, usually Women's National League, whilst also being eligible for their original team's academy or even senior team games.

There are no players currently on loan to AFC Bournemouth.

=== Out on loan ===
There are no Bournemouth players currently out on loan.

== Management ==
=== Current management and coaching staff ===
As of August 2025

Name	Role
Helen Bleazard	Manager

=== Managerial history ===
Dates	Name
2016–2019	(England) Steve Davies
2019–2025	(England) Steve Cuss
2025–	(Wales) Helen Bleazard

== Honours and achievements ==
League

- Southern Region Premier Division (level 4)
  - Champions: 2005–06
- Southern Region Division One (level 5)
  - Champions: 2003–04
- Hampshire County Division Two (level 8)
  - Champions: 2015–16
- Hampshire County Division Three (level 9)
  - Champions: 2014–15

Cup

- South West Combination League Cup
  - Runners-up: 2007–08
- Southern Region League Cup
  - Winners: 2005–06
- The Chairman's Cup
  - Winners: 2018-19
- The Hampshire Senior Cup
  - Winners: 2022-23, 2023-24
- FA Women's National League Plate
  - Winners: 2024-25
- FA Women's National League Cup
  - Winners: 2025-26

== League history ==
Champions	Runners-up	Promoted ↑	Relegated ↓

Season	League									FA Cup	League Cup	Other	
Season	Division (tier)	Pld	W	D	L	GF	GA	Pts	Pos	FA Cup	League Cup	Competition	Res
2018–19	Southern Region Premier (5)	18	16	0	2	93	16	48	2nd	R1	PR	The Chairman's Cup The Hampshire Senior Cup	W R2
2019–20	Southern Region Premier (5) (Note: Cancelled as a result of the COVID-19 pandemic.)	0	0	0	0	0	0	0	-	Q3	-	The Hampshire Senior Cup	R2
2020–21	Southern Region Premier (5)	1	1	0	0	11	0	3	6th	R1	R1	The Subsidiary Cup	SF
2021–22	Division One South West (4)	18	12	4	2	52	14	40	2nd	R2	R1	The Hampshire Senior Cup	RU
2022–23	Division One South West (4)	22	13	4	5	59	21	43	4th	R1	DR	FA League Plate The Hampshire Senior Cup	R1 W
2023–24	Division One South West (4)	22	19	3	0	98	12	58	2nd	R3	R1	The Hampshire Senior Cup	W
2024–25	↑Division One South West (4)	22	21	1	0	100	7	62	1st	R3	DR	FA League Plate The Hampshire Senior Cup	W RU
2025–26	Southern Premier Division (3)	22	14	4	4	61	11	46	3rd	R4	W	N/A	N/A

Key to league competitions:

- Southern Region Premier - Southern Region Women's Football League Premier Division. (The fifth tier of English women's football.
- Division One South West - The FA Women's National League Southern Division One South West. (The fourth tier of English women's football.

Key to cup competitions:

- DR = Determining Round (Note: All National League clubs are entered at the Determining Round, with the winners continuing in the League Cup competition and the losers going into the National League Plate tournament.)
- PR = Preliminary Round
- R1, R2, etc. = Round 1, Round 2, etc.
- Q1, Q2, etc. = Qualifying Round 1, Qualifying Round 2, etc.
- SF = Semi-finals
- RU = Runners Up
- W = Winners
