= 2024–25 FA Women's National League Plate =

Tournament details
- Country: England
- Dates: 15 September 2024 – 21 April 2025
- Teams: 29

Final positions
- Champions: Bournemouth (1st title)
- Runners-up: Cheltenham Town

Tournament statistics
- Matches played: 45
- Goals scored: 172 (3.82 per match)
- All statistics correct as of 13 April 2025.

The 2024–25 FA Women's National League Plate is the tenth season of the competition, open to those eliminated in the determining round of the WNL Cup.

For the first time, academy teams from Super League and Championship sides were invited to participate in the competition. Reigning champions Derby County won their determining round match this season, meaning that they did not defend their title.

The final was played at Court Place Farm on 13 April 2025 between AFC Bournemouth and Cheltenham Town. Bournemouth claimed their first title following a 3–2 win.

== Results ==
All results listed are published by The Football Association. Games are listed by round in chronological order, and then in alphabetical order of the home team where matches were played simultaneously.

The division each team play in is indicated in brackets after their name: (S)=Southern Division; (N)=Northern Division; (SW1)=South West Division One; (SE1)=South East Division One; (M1)=Midlands Division One; (N1)=Northern Division One; (PGA)=Professional Game Academy

=== Preliminary round ===
15 September 2024	Actonians (SE1)	3–0	Abingdon United (SW1)	Feltham
15:00	Mohamed 25', 60'; McKenzie 27'	Report		Stadium: Bedfont Sports Club; Attendance: 77

15 September 2024	AFC Bournemouth (SW1)	8–0	Portishead Town (SW1)	Ringwood
14:00	Jones 11'; James 23'; Markham 25', 32'; Bloomfield 49'; Gilroy 56', 81', 84'	Report		Stadium: Macra Community Stadium; Attendance: 244

15 September 2024	AFC Fylde (N1)	2–1	Chorley (N1)	Preston
14:00	Binks 13'; Duffell 63'	Report	Worthington 88'	Stadium: Kellamergh Park; Attendance: 55

15 September 2024	AFC Wimbledon (S)	H–W	Arsenal Academy (PGA)	Wimbledon
14:00		Report		Stadium: Plough Lane

15 September 2024	Boldmere St. Michaels (M1)	9–1	Lincoln City (SW1)	Boldmere
15:00	Ackroyd; Formaston; Straker; Travers; Astell; Bojang	Report	Kendell	Stadium: Boldmere Community Stadium; Attendance: 101

15 September 2024	Chelsea Academy (PGA)	1–2	Bristol City Academy (PGA)	Stoke D'Abernon
15:00	Mpome	Report	Day; Gready	Stadium: Cobham Training Centre; Attendance: 50

15 September 2024	Chesham United (SE1)	3–2	Tottenham Hotspur Academy (PGA)	Chesham
14:00	Fraser 6' (pen.), 67'; Fryer 9'	Report	Oteng 26', 48'	Stadium: The Meadow; Attendance: 90

15 September 2024	Crystal Palace Academy (PGA)	1–4	Southampton Academy (PGA)	Beckenham
14:00	Tara Walsh 48'	Report	Lampard 9'; Udebhulu 27', 31'; Mallon 44'	Stadium: Eden Park Avenue; Attendance: 150

15 September 2024	Halifax (N)	H–W	Sheffield United Academy (PGA)	Bradford
14:00		Report		Stadium: Horsfall Stadium

15 September 2024	Keynsham Town (SW1)	4–1	Bristol Rovers (SW1)	Keynsham
14:00	Clipston; Kretteis; Lundy; Vipond	Report	Jarvis 80'	Stadium: The AJN Stadium; Attendance: 125

15 September 2024	Leafield Athletic (M1)	1–2 (a.e.t.)	Stockport County (N1)	Birmingham
15:00	Crackle 90+5'	Report	Brady 70'; Figueiredo 93'	Stadium: Castle Vale Stadium; Attendance: 70

15 September 2024	Norton & Stockton Ancients (N1)	5–3 (a.e.t.)	Doncaster Rovers Belles (N1)	Stockton-on-Tees
14:00	Owens 69', 78', 89', 110'; Mitchell 105+2'	Report	Barnes 61'; Tugby-Andrew 70'; Saxton 83'	Stadium: Norton Sports Complex; Attendance: 40

15 September 2024	Norwich City (SE1)	1–0	Brighton & Hove Albion Academy (PGA)	Horsford
14:00	Strauss 10' (pen.)	Report		Stadium: The Nest; Attendance: 321

15 September 2024	Sunderland Academy (PGA)	2–4	Liverpool Academy (PGA)	Cleadon
14:00	Cairns; Dunbar	Report	Wilby; Maddocks; McDonald; Smith	Stadium: Academy of Light; Attendance: 60

=== First round ===
29 September 2024	AFC Wimbledon (S)	7–0	Chesham United (SE1)	Raynes Park
14:00	Rutherford 7'; Mackenzie 15'; Donovan 17'; Bell 42', 85'; Hincks 45+1'; Khassel 54'	Report		Stadium: Prince George's Playing Fields

29 September 2024	Bournemouth Sports (SW1)	0–1	Charlton Athletic Academy (PGA)	Christchurch
14:00		Report	Bethelmie 59'	Stadium: Chapel Gate

29 September 2024	Cambridge United (SE1)	1–0	Bristol City Academy (PGA)	St Neots
14:00	Coupar 90'	Report		Stadium: Rowley Park

29 September 2024	Halifax (N)	2–1	Notts County (M1)	Bradford
14:00	Gallagher 25'; Wilson 43'	Report	Monk 34'	Stadium: Horsfall Stadium; Attendance: 108

29 September 2024	Lincoln United (M1)	1–4	Aston Villa Academy (PGA)	Lincoln
14:00	Hayes 54'	Report	Sorrentino 13', 24', 78'; Apuusi-Tchassem 69'	Stadium: Ashby Avenue

29 September 2024	London Seaward (SE1)	A–W	AFC Bournemouth (SW1)	Barkingside
14:00		Report		Stadium: Techsoc.com Stadium

29 September 2024	Loughborough Lightning (M1)	4–1 (a.e.t.)	Norton & Stockton Ancients (N1)	Loughborough
14:00	Jarowicki 4'; Jacobs 104'; Zynia Delglyn 109', 114'	Report	Marshall 84'	Stadium: Holywell Sports Complex

29 September 2024	Manchester United Academy (PGA)	H–W	Leicester City Academy (PGA)
14:00		Report

29 September 2024	Norwich City (SE1)	3–2	Milton Keynes Dons (S)	Norwich
14:00	Densley 5', 86'; Medd-Gill 34'	Report	Jacovides 77', 90+7'	Stadium: The Nest

29 September 2024	Southampton Academy (PGA)	3–0	Ashford Town (Middlesex) (SE1)	Totton and Eling
14:00	Chads 54'; Ubedhulu 57'; Mallon 90+2'	Report		Stadium: Snows Stadium; Attendance: 80

29 September 2024	Sporting Khalsa (M1)	0–2	Durham Cestria (N1)	Willenhall
14:00		Report	Clarke 44'; Nicholson 90+6'	Stadium: Guardian Warehousing Arena; Attendance: 44

29 September 2024	Stockport County (N1)	2–1	Liverpool Academy (PGA)	Woodley
14:00	Bradshaw 18'; Hamer 86'	Report	Bermingham 16'	Stadium: Stockport Sports Village; Attendance: 152

29 September 2024	Wolverhampton Wanderers (N)	3–0	AFC Fylde (N1)	Wellington
14:00	Merrick 30', 72'; Loydon 62'	Report		Stadium: SEAH Stadium; Attendance: 253

29 September 2024	Worthing (SW1)	7–0	Keynsham Town (SW1)	Worthing
14:00	Bell 1'; 6' (o.g.); Lane 26', 60'; Talbut-Smith 46'; Scott 72'	Report		Stadium: Woodside Road

29 September 2024	Chatham Town (SE1)	0–1	Actonians (SE1)	Chatham
14:30		Report	Knorr 67'	Stadium: Maidstone Road Sports Ground

29 September 2024	Boldmere St. Michaels (M1)	1–4	Cheltenham Town (S)	Boldmere
15:00	Gregory 49'	Report	Bell 7'; Owen 13' (pen.); Pengelly 40'; Greenwood 59'	Stadium: Boldmere Community Stadium

=== Second round ===
20 October 2024	AFC Bournemouth (SW1)	5–2	Worthing (SW1)	Ringwood
14:00	Barron-Clark 2'; James 12'; Markham 31'; Bloomfield 34'; Cooper 68'	Report	Scott 58'; Hume 89'	Stadium: Macra Community Stadium; Attendance: 124

20 October 2024	Aston Villa Academy (PGA)	1–3	Manchester United Academy (PGA)	Bodymoor Heath
14:00	Goal	Report	Wareing 51'; Oldroyd 72'; Fletcher 83'	Stadium: Bodymoor Heath Training Ground

20 October 2024	Cambridge United (SE1)	1–0	Charlton Athletic Academy (PGA)	St Neots
14:00	Simmons 13'	Report		Stadium: Rowley Park

20 October 2024	Cheltenham Town (S)	2–1	Wolverhampton Wanderers (N)	Bishop's Cleeve
14:00	Collis 14'; Owen 20'	Report	Morphet 22'	Stadium: Kayte Lane

20 October 2024	Halifax (N)	2–3	Loughborough Lightning (M1)	Bradford
14:00	Wilson 55'; Harrison 89'	Report	Unknown 11' (o.g.); Delglyn 33'; Collyer 85'	Stadium: Horsfall Stadium

20 October 2024	Norwich City (SE1)	2–0	Actonians (SE1)	Horsford
14:00	Shaw 67', 86'	Report		Stadium: The Nest

20 October 2024	Stockport County (N1)	2–0	Durham Cestria (N1)	Woodley
14:00	Figueiredo 22'; Owen 86' (pen.)	Report		Stadium: Stockport Sports Village

27 October 2024	AFC Wimbledon (S)	2–2 (a.e.t.) (5–6 p)	Southampton Academy (PGA)	Summerstown
14:00	Dorey 66'; Taylor 69'	Report	87'; 89'	Stadium: Cherry Red Records
	Penalties
	Penalty missed Penalty scored		Penalty scored Penalty missed

=== Quarter-finals ===
1 December 2024	AFC Bournemouth (SW1)	2–1	Cambridge United (SE1)	Ringwood
14:00	Barron-Clark 10'; Gilroy 66'	Report	Gillies 55'	Stadium: Macra Community Stadium

1 December 2024	Southampton Academy (PGA)	2–1	Norwich City (SE1)
14:00	Lucas 67'; Buckingham 89'	Report	Moore 60'

1 December 2024	Stockport County (N1)	1–2 (a.e.t.)	Cheltenham Town (S)	Woodley
14:00	Hamer 53'	Report	Wellesley-Davies 84'; Collis 95'	Stadium: Stockport Sports Village; Attendance: 79

15 December 2024	Loughborough Lightning (M1)	0–3	Manchester United Academy (PGA)
14:00		Report	Farrall 17', 70'; Griffiths 72'	Attendance: 50

=== Semi-finals ===
26 January 2025	AFC Bournemouth (SW1)	3–2	Manchester United Academy (PGA)	Ringwood
14:00	McGuinness 11'; Strippel 54'; Clark 64'	Report	Farrall 7'; Griffiths 80'	Stadium: Macra Community Stadium; Attendance: 324

26 January 2025	Cheltenham Town (S)	1–0	Southampton Academy (PGA)	Bishop's Cleeve
14:00	Lue 65'	Report		Stadium: Kayte Lane

=== Final ===
13 April 2025	AFC Bournemouth (SW1)	3–2	Cheltenham Town (S)	Marston
14:00	Thompson 11'; Markham 24'; Strippel 36'	Report	Lue 30'; Owen 74'	Stadium: Court Place Farm; Attendance: 527
