= 2024–25 FA Women's National League =

FA Women's National League
- Season: 2024–25
- Dates: 18 August 2024 – 27 April 2025

The 2024–25 FA Women's National League is the 34th season of the competition, and the seventh since a restructure and rebranding of the top four tiers of English football by The Football Association. Starting in 1991, it was previously known as the FA Women's Premier League. It sits at the third and fourth levels of the women's football pyramid, below the Women's Championship and above the eight regional football leagues.

The league features six regional divisions: the Northern and Southern Premier divisions at level three of the pyramid, and Division One North, Division One Midlands, Division One South East, and Division One South West at the fourth level. The league consists of 72 teams, divided into six divisions of 12 each. The winners of the Northern and Southern Premier divisions will be promoted to the Women's Championship. The bottom two teams will be relegated to the appropriate fourth tier FA WNL Division One. The winner of each Division One will be promoted to the Northern or Southern Premier Division, with the bottom two teams in those leagues relegated to respective regional leagues.

== Premier Division ==
=== Northern Premier Division ===
FA Women's National League Northern Premier Division
- Season: 2024–25
- Champions: Nottingham Forest
- Promoted: Nottingham Forest
- Relegated: Stourbridge
- Matches: 132
- Goals: 538 (4.08 per match)
- Top goalscorer: Charlotte Greengrass (Wolverhampton Wanderers); Melissa Johnson (Nottingham Forest) (21 goals)
- Biggest home win: Burnley 9–0 Hull City (18 August 2024); Nottingham Forest 9–0 Stourbridge (8 September 2024); Burnley 9–0 Stourbridge (26 January 2025)
- Biggest away win: Halifax 0–10 Rugby Borough (18 August 2024)
- Highest scoring: Halifax 0–10 Rugby Borough (18 August 2024)

Changes from last season:

- Newcastle United were promoted to the Championship as WNL North champions.
- Rugby Borough were realigned from Southern Premier Division.
- Hull City were promoted from Division One North as champions.
- Sporting Khalsa were promoted from Division One Midlands as champions.
- AFC Fylde were relegated to Division One North.
- Huddersfield Town were relegated to Division One North.

Club	Home ground	Position 2023–24
Burnley	Lancashire County Ground, Leyland	2nd
Derby County	Don Amott Arena, Derby	7th
Halifax	Horsfall Stadium, Bradford	6th
Hull City	Easy Buy Stadium, Barton-upon-Humber	WNL D1 North, 1st
Liverpool Feds	Jericho Lane, Liverpool	8th
Nottingham Forest	City Ground, West Bridgford	3rd
Rugby Borough	Kilsby Lane, Rugby	WNL South, 3rd
Sporting Khalsa	Guardian Warehousing Arena, Willenhall	WNL D1 Midlands, 1st
Stoke City	Wellbeing Park, Yarnfield	5th
Stourbridge	War Memorial Ground, Stourbridge	10th
West Bromwich Albion	Valley Stadium, Redditch	9th
Wolverhampton Wanderers	New Bucks Head, Telford	4th

Location of Northern Premier Division clubs for the 2024–25 season

==== League table ====
Pos	Team	Pld	W	D	L	GF	GA	GD	Pts	Qualification
1	Nottingham Forest (C, P)	22	18	4	0	79	8	+71	58	Promotion to Championship
2	Wolverhampton Wanderers	22	17	4	1	79	21	+58	55	
3	Stoke City	22	16	1	5	66	30	+36	49	
4	Burnley	22	15	1	6	76	19	+57	46	
5	Rugby Borough	22	12	6	4	57	20	+37	42	
6	Liverpool Feds	22	10	2	10	35	53	−18	32	
7	West Bromwich Albion	22	7	1	14	31	52	−21	22	
8	Hull City	22	6	4	12	27	55	−28	22	
9	Derby County	22	6	3	13	27	45	−18	21	
10	Sporting Khalsa	22	6	3	13	34	62	−28	21	
11	Halifax	22	2	1	19	13	86	−73	7	
12	Stourbridge (R)	22	2	0	20	14	87	−73	5 (Note: Stourbridge were deducted 1 point for failing to fulfil their fixture against Nottingham Forest on 2 March 2025. Subsequently, Stourbridge received a £250 fine and the fixture was rescheduled.)	Relegation to FA WNL Division One

Source: The Football Association
Rules for classification: 1) Points; 2) Goal difference; 3) Number of goals scored
(C) Champions; (P) Promoted; (R) Relegated

==== Results ====
Home \ Away	BUR	DER	HFX	HUL	LIV	NOT	RUG	SPK	STK	STR	WBA	WOL
Burnley	—	2–0	7–0	9–0	5–0	0–2	2–3	7–0	2–3	9–0	1–0	0–1
Derby County	0–4	—	2–0	1–2	0–6	1–2	1–1	0–0	2–4	3–0	2–1	1–2
Halifax	0–7	0–0	—	1–4	1–2	0–2	0–10	0–1	0–4	0–3	2–3	1–6
Hull City	0–2	2–4	1–2	—	2–4	0–4	1–1	1–1	0–1	2–1	2–1	3–3
Liverpool Feds	1–2	2–1	2–1	2–0	—	0–7	0–0	5–1	0–6	2–0	1–1	1–2
Nottingham Forest	1–1	2–0	8–0	1–1	4–0	—	1–0	7–0	4–0	9–0	7–2	1–1
Rugby Borough	3–1	4–0	3–1	4–0	3–1	1–1	—	2–2	1–2	2–0	0–1	1–1
Sporting Khalsa	1–3	1–4	6–1	4–0	6–0	0–1	1–5	—	0–4	5–0	2–1	2–5
Stoke City	1–5	4–1	4–0	3–0	4–1	0–3	2–3	6–0	—	4–0	3–0	2–2
Stourbridge	1–3	0–4	1–3	2–4	0–2	0–4	0–5	2–1	1–6	—	1–3	2–7
West Bromwich Albion	0–3	2–0	4–0	0–2	1–3	0–2	0–5	4–0	2–3	5–0	—	0–8
Wolverhampton Wanderers	2–1	4–0	6–0	4–0	6–0	1–6	2–0	4–0	3–0	4–0	5–0	—

Source: The Football Association
Legend: Blue = home team win; Yellow = draw; Red = away team win.

==== Top scorers ====
As of match(es) played 27 April 2025

Rank	Player	Club	Goals
1	(England) Charlotte Greengrass	Wolverhampton Wanderers	21
1	(Jamaica) Melissa Johnson	Nottingham Forest	21
3	(England) Amber Hughes	Wolverhampton Wanderers	20
4	(England) Charlie Wellings	Nottingham Forest	16
5	(England) Yasmin Mosby	Rugby Borough	15
6	(England) Millie Ravening	Stoke City	14
7	(England) Laura Elford	Burnley	12
8	(England) Sophie Domingo	Nottingham Forest	10
8	(Northern Ireland) Brenna McPartlan	Burnley	10
8	(England) Evie Priestley	Stoke City	10

=== Southern Premier Division ===
FA Women's National League Southern Premier Division
- Season: 2024–25
- Champions: Ipswich Town
- Promoted: Ipswich Town
- Relegated: Milton Keynes Dons
- Matches: 132
- Goals: 464 (3.52 per match)
- Top goalscorer: Sophie Peskett (Ipswich Town) (23 goals)
- Biggest home win: Ipswich Town 13–0 Milton Keynes Dons (27 October 2024)
- Biggest away win: Milton Keynes Dons 0–11 Ipswich Town (13 April 2025)
- Highest scoring: Ipswich Town 13–0 Milton Keynes Dons (27 October 2024)

Changes from last season:

- Portsmouth were promoted to Championship as WNL South champions.
- Lewes were relegated from Championship.
- Watford were relegated from Championship.
- Rugby Borough were realigned to Northern Premier Division.
- Exeter City were promoted from Division One South West as champions.
- AFC Wimbledon were promoted from Division One South East as champions.
- Chatham Town were relegated to Division One South East.
- London Bees were relegated to Division One South East.
- Cardiff City Ladies rebranded as Gwalia United.

Club	Home ground	Position 2023–24
AFC Wimbledon	Grand Drive, Raynes Park	WNL D1 South East, 1st
Billericay Town	New Lodge, Billericay	10th
Cheltenham Town	Kayte Lane, Bishop's Cleeve	7th
Exeter City	Coach Road, Newton Abbot	WNL D1 South West, 1st
Gwalia United	Newport Stadium, Newport	8th (as Cardiff City)
Hashtag United	Parkside, Aveley	2nd
Ipswich Town	The Martello Ground, Felixstowe	4th
Lewes	The Dripping Pan, Lewes	Championship, 11th
Milton Keynes Dons	Willen Road, Newport Pagnell	6th
Oxford United	Marsh Lane, Marston	5th
Plymouth Argyle	Home Park, Plymouth	9th
Watford	Grosvenor Vale, Ruislip	Championship, 12th

Location of Southern Premier Division clubs for the 2024–25 season

==== League table ====
Pos	Team	Pld	W	D	L	GF	GA	GD	Pts	Qualification
1	Ipswich Town (C, P)	22	17	3	2	89	10	+79	54	Promotion to Championship
2	Hashtag United	22	15	3	4	49	16	+33	48	
3	Watford	22	13	5	4	57	17	+40	44	
4	Exeter City	22	13	4	5	50	29	+21	43	
5	Oxford United	22	13	3	6	38	18	+20	42	
6	Lewes	22	8	7	7	37	28	+9	31	
7	AFC Wimbledon	22	9	4	9	32	28	+4	31	
8	Cheltenham Town	22	7	2	13	32	47	−15	23	
9	Gwalia United	22	5	4	13	20	38	−18	22 (Note: Billericay Town were deducted three points for fielding an ineligible player in their FA WNL Southern Premier Division away fixture against Gwalia United on Sunday 17 November, which they won 1–0. Consequently, Billericay Town were imposed a fine of £100 and the three points for the match were transferred to Gwalia United.)	
10	Plymouth Argyle	22	6	2	14	25	53	−28	20	
11	Billericay Town	22	6	2	14	25	56	−31	17	
12	Milton Keynes Dons (R)	22	0	1	21	10	124	−114	1	Relegation to FA WNL Division One

Source: The Football Association
Rules for classification: 1) Points; 2) Goal difference; 3) Number of goals scored
(C) Champions; (P) Promoted; (R) Relegated

==== Results ====
Home \ Away	WIM	BIL	CHL	EXE	GWA	HSH	IPS	LEW	MKD	OXF	PLY	WAT
AFC Wimbledon	—	4–0	1–2	4–1	1–0	0–3	0–3	1–1	5–0	0–0	1–2	1–1
Billericay Town	0–3	—	2–1	2–4	4–0	0–2	0–6	2–1	5–1	0–1	2–1	1–5
Cheltenham Town	0–3	3–0	—	0–3	2–2	1–1	0–7	2–0	5–1	1–2	4–0	1–2
Exeter City	2–1	4–1	2–1	—	1–1	0–0	2–2	1–0	7–0	0–3	1–0	2–2
Gwalia United	1–0	0–1	2–1	2–3	—	2–0	0–2	0–0	4–0	0–3	0–2	0–3
Hashtag United	3–0	2–1	3–1	2–0	2–1	—	1–0	3–0	3–0	2–0	2–0	3–1
Ipswich Town	5–0	5–0	8–0	2–1	2–0	2–0	—	5–0	13–0	4–2	3–1	0–0
Lewes	2–0	3–0	3–0	0–4	0–0	2–2	1–1	—	7–0	1–1	2–0	1–1
Milton Keynes Dons	0–3	3–3	0–5	1–6	0–2	1–10	0–11	0–7	—	1–3	1–5	0–7
Oxford United	0–1	4–0	3–0	0–1	4–0	2–0	0–3	1–2	3–0	—	1–0	0–0
Plymouth Argyle	2–2	2–2	0–2	0–3	4–3	0–5	1–5	2–1	2–1	1–3	—	0–4
Watford	0–1	1–0	2–0	5–2	4–0	2–0	1–0	2–3	8–0	1–2	5–0	—

Updated to match(es) played on 27 April 2025. Source: The Football Association
Legend: Blue = home team win; Yellow = draw; Red = away team win.

==== Top scorers ====
As of match(es) played 27 April 2025

Rank	Player	Club	Goals
1	(England) Sophie Peskett	Ipswich Town	23
2	(England) Sophie Gillies	Exeter City	17
3	(England) Natasha Thomas	Ipswich Town	15
4	(Wales) Phoebie Poole	Oxford United	13
5	(England) Ashlee Hincks	AFC Wimbledon	12
5	(England) Lucy O'Brien	Ipswich Town	12
5	(England) Sarah Stacey	Exeter City	12
8	(Jamaica) Una Lue	Cheltenham Town	11
9	(England) Madison Perry	Watford	10
10	(England) Charlotte Whitmore	Plymouth Argyle	9

== Division One ==
=== Division One North ===
FA Women's National League Division One North
- Season: 2024–25
- Champions: Middlesbrough
- Promoted: Middlesbrough
- Relegated: AFC Fylde
- Matches: 132
- Goals: 430 (3.26 per match)
- Top goalscorer: Bianca Owens (Norton & Stockton Ancients); Amy Woodruff (Leeds United) (18 goals)
- Biggest home win: Middlesbrough 7–0 Doncaster Rovers Belles (13 April 2025)
- Biggest away win: Barnsley F.C. 0–4 Durham Cestria (15 December 2024); Durham Cestria 0–4 Norton & Stockton Ancients (20 February 2025)
- Highest scoring: Doncaster Rovers Belles 3–6 Leeds United (12 February 2025)

Changes from last season:

- Hull City were promoted to Northern Premier Division as Division One North champions.
- AFC Fylde were relegated from Northern Premier Division.
- Huddersfield Town were relegated from Northern Premier Division.
- Barnsley F.C. were promoted from North East Regional Women's Football League as champions.
- Cheadle Town Stingers were promoted from North West Women's Regional Football League as champions.
- Barnsley Women's were realigned to Division One Midlands.
- F.C. United of Manchester were relegated to North West Women's Regional Football League.
- Chester-le-Street Town were relegated to North East Regional Women's Football League.

Club	Home ground	Position 2023–24
AFC Fylde	Kelamergh Park, Warton	WNL North, 12th
Barnsley F.C.	Oakwell Training Ground, Barnsley	NERWFL, 1st
Cheadle Town Stingers	Park Road Stadium, Cheadle	NWWRFL, 1st
Chorley	Jim Fowlers Memorial Ground, Euxton	8th
Doncaster Rovers Belles	Eco-Power Stadium, Doncaster	7th
Durham Cestria	The Graham Sports Centre, Durham	3rd
Huddersfield Town	The Stafflex Arena, Kirkburton	WNL North, 11th
Leeds United	Bannister Prentice Stadium, Garforth	6th
Middlesbrough	Bishopton Road West, Stockton	2nd
Norton & Stockton Ancients	Station Road, Norton, County Durham	9th
Stockport County	Stockport Sports Village, Stockport	5th
York City	University of York Sports Centre, York	10th

Location of Division One North clubs for the 2024–25 season

==== League table ====
Pos	Team	Pld	W	D	L	GF	GA	GD	Pts	Qualification
1	Middlesbrough (C, P)	22	15	6	1	45	13	+32	51	Promotion to FA WNL Premier Division
2	Cheadle Town Stingers	22	16	3	3	38	11	+27	51	
3	Chorley	22	13	4	5	47	30	+17	43	
4	Leeds United	22	13	2	7	53	32	+21	41	
5	Huddersfield Town	22	10	6	6	31	24	+7	36	
6	Durham Cestria	22	7	4	11	42	43	−1	25	
7	Stockport County	22	7	4	11	28	37	−9	25	
8	Barnsley F.C.	22	6	5	11	32	43	−11	23	
9	Norton & Stockton Ancients	22	6	5	11	30	43	−13	23	
10	York City	22	6	3	13	29	54	−25	21	
11	Doncaster Rovers Belles	22	4	5	13	34	54	−20	17	
12	AFC Fylde (R)	22	3	5	14	21	46	−25	14	Relegation to regional league level

Source: The Football Association
Rules for classification: 1) Points; 2) Goal difference; 3) Number of goals scored
(C) Champions; (P) Promoted; (R) Relegated

=== Division One Midlands ===
FA Women's National League Division One Midlands
- Season: 2024–25
- Champions: Loughborough Lightning
- Promoted: Loughborough Lightning
- Relegated: Solihull Moors; Lincoln City
- Matches: 132
- Goals: 536 (4.06 per match)
- Top goalscorer: Jade Bell (Northampton Town) (33 goals)
- Biggest home win: Northampton Town 12–0 Lincoln City (23 March 2025)
- Biggest away win: Lincoln City 1–10 Peterborough United (15 December 2024)
- Highest scoring: Northampton Town 12–0 Lincoln City (23 March 2025)

Changes from last season:

- Sporting Khalsa were promoted to Northern Premier Division as Division One Midlands champions.
- Barnsley Women's were realigned from Division One North.
- Lincoln United were promoted from East Midlands Regional Women's Football League as champions.
- Worcester City were promoted from West Midlands Regional Women's Football League as champions.
- Sheffield F.C. were relegated to East Midlands Regional Women's Football League.
- Leek Town were relegated to East Midlands Regional Women's Football League.

Club	Home ground	Position 2023–24
Barnsley Women's	Sheffield Olympic Legacy Park, Sheffield	WNL D1 North, 4th
Boldmere St. Michaels	Trevor Brown Memorial Ground, Sutton Coldfield	4th
Leafield Athletic	Castle Vale Stadium, Birmingham	9th
Lincoln City	Martin and Co Arena, Northolme	8th
Lincoln United	Ashby Avenue, Lincoln	EMRWFL, 1st
Loughborough Lightning	Loughborough University Stadium, Loughborough	2nd
Northampton Town	Fernie Fields, Northampton	5th
Notts County	Coronation Park, Eastwood	10th
Peterborough United	Abbey Lawn, Bourne	3rd
Solihull Moors	Studley Sports Centre, Studley	6th
Sutton Coldfield Town	Central Ground, Sutton Coldfield	7th
Worcester City	Sixways Stadium, Worcester	WMRWFL, 1st

Location of Division One Midlands clubs for the 2024–25 season

==== League table ====
Pos	Team	Pld	W	D	L	GF	GA	GD	Pts	Qualification
1	Loughborough Lightning (C, P)	22	19	3	0	85	10	+75	60	Promotion to FA WNL Premier Division
2	Northampton Town	22	17	1	4	78	22	+56	52	
3	Peterborough United	22	16	3	3	62	21	+41	51	
4	Leafield Athletic	22	16	0	6	59	22	+37	48	
5	Boldmere St. Michaels	22	13	1	8	51	26	+25	40	
6	Barnsley Women's	22	10	3	9	45	36	+9	33	
7	Notts County	22	10	2	10	43	53	−10	32	
8	Sutton Coldfield Town	22	8	1	13	35	46	−11	25	
9	Lincoln United	22	7	1	14	28	61	−33	22	
10	Worcester City	22	3	4	15	31	56	−25	13	
11	Solihull Moors (R)	22	1	4	17	14	66	−52	6 (Note: On 13 November 2024, Solihull Moors were deducted 1 point for failing to fulfil their fixture against Loughborough Lightning. As a result, Solihull received a suspended £250 fine and the game was rescheduled.)	Relegation to regional league level
12	Lincoln City (R)	22	0	1	21	5	117	−112	1	Relegation to regional league level

Source: The Football Association
Rules for classification: 1) Points; 2) Goal difference; 3) Number of goals scored
(C) Champions; (P) Promoted; (R) Relegated

=== Division One South East ===
FA Women's National League Division One South East
- Season: 2024–25
- Champions: Real Bedford
- Promoted: Real Bedford
- Relegated: Ashford Town (Mid); London Seaward
- Matches: 132
- Goals: 474 (3.59 per match)
- Top goalscorer: Abbie Bensted (Real Bedford) (20 goals)
- Biggest home win: Real Bedford 12–2 Chesham United (27 October 2024); Real Bedford 11–1 London Seaward (13 April 2025); Chatham Town 10–0 Chesham United (13 April 2025)
- Biggest away win: London Seaward 0–9 AFC Sudbury (27 April 2025)
- Highest scoring: Real Bedford 12–2 Chesham United (27 October 2024)

Changes from last season:

- AFC Wimbledon were promoted to Southern Premier Division as Division One South East champions.
- Chatham Town were relegated from Southern Premier Division.
- London Bees were relegated from Southern Premier Division.
- Worthing were realigned to Division One South West.
- Dulwich Hamlet were promoted from London and South East Women's Regional Football League as champions.
- Real Bedford were promoted from Eastern Region Women's Football League as champions.
- Haywards Heath Town were relegated to London and South East Women's Regional Football League.
- Cambridge City were relegated to Eastern Region Women's Football League.

Club	Home ground	Position 2023–24
Actonians	Rectory Park, Northolt	6th
AFC Sudbury	King's Marsh Stadium, Sudbury	10th
Ashford Town (Mid)	Robert Parker Stadium, Stanwell	4th
Cambridge United	Rowley Park, St Neots	7th
Chatham Town	Bauvill Stadium, Chatham	WNL South, 11th
Chesham United	The Meadow, Chesham	9th
Dulwich Hamlet	Champion Hill, East Dulwich	LSEWRFL, 1st
London Bees	The Hive, Edgware	WNL South, 12th
London Seaward	Hornchurch Stadium, Upminster	8th
Norwich City	The Nest, Horsford	2nd
Queens Park Rangers	Powerday Stadium, Perivale	5th
Real Bedford	McMullen Park, Bedford	ERWFL, 1st

Location of Division One South East clubs for the 2024–25 season

==== League table ====
Pos	Team	Pld	W	D	L	GF	GA	GD	Pts	Qualification
1	Real Bedford (C, P)	22	14	7	1	66	15	+51	49	Promotion to FA WNL Premier Division
2	Norwich City	22	14	5	3	50	17	+33	47	
3	Chatham Town	22	12	7	3	48	14	+34	43	
4	London Bees	22	12	5	5	59	31	+28	41	
5	Queens Park Rangers	22	10	6	6	37	29	+8	36	
6	Actonians	22	10	4	8	40	24	+16	34	
7	AFC Sudbury	22	9	7	6	40	34	+6	34	
8	Dulwich Hamlet	22	8	5	9	36	28	+8	29	
9	Cambridge United	22	7	4	11	37	40	−3	25	
10	Chesham United	22	5	3	14	27	76	−49	18	
11	Ashford Town (R)	22	2	2	18	24	83	−59	8	Relegation to regional league level
12	London Seaward (R)	22	1	1	20	10	83	−73	4	Relegation to regional league level

Source: The Football Association
Rules for classification: 1) Points; 2) Goal difference; 3) Number of goals scored
(C) Champions; (P) Promoted; (R) Relegated

=== Division One South West ===
FA Women's National League Division One South West
- Season: 2024–25
- Champions: AFC Bournemouth
- Promoted: AFC Bournemouth
- Relegated: Southampton Women's
- Matches: 132
- Goals: 491 (3.72 per match)
- Top goalscorer: Shannon Albuery (Moneyfields); Jenna Markham (AFC Bournemouth) (19 goals)
- Biggest home win: Swindon Town 9–0 Southampton Women's (8 September 2024); AFC Bournemouth 9–0 Maidenhead United (8 September 2024)
- Biggest away win: Southampton Women's 0–10 AFC Bournemouth (27 October 2024)
- Highest scoring: Southampton Women's 0–10 AFC Bournemouth (27 October 2024)

Changes from last season:

- Exeter City were promoted to Southern Premier Division as Division One South West champions.
- Worthing were realigned from Division One South East.
- Bristol Rovers were promoted from South West Regional Women's Football League as champions.
- Bournemouth Sports were promoted from Southern Region Women's Football League as champions.
- Selsey were relegated to South West Regional Women's Football League.
- Torquay United were relegated to South West Regional Women's Football League.

Club	Home ground	Position 2023–24
Abingdon United	Northcourt Stadium, Abingdon	5th
AFC Bournemouth	Long Lane, Ringwood	2nd
Bournemouth Sports	Chapel Gate, Hurn	SRWFL, 1st
Bridgwater United	Fairfax Park, Bridgwater	6th
Bristol Rovers	Memorial Stadium, Bristol	SWRWFL, 1st
Keynsham Town	Crown Field, Keynsham	7th
Maidenhead United	York Road, Maidenhead	8th
Moneyfields	Moneyfields Sports Ground, Portsmouth	3rd
Portishead Town	Bristol Road, Portishead	9th
Southampton Women's	Arlebury Park, New Alresford	10th
Swindon Town	Cinder Lane, Fairford	4th
Worthing	Woodside Road, Worthing	WNL D1 South East, 3rd

Location of Division One South West clubs for the 2024–25 season

==== League table ====
Pos	Team	Pld	W	D	L	GF	GA	GD	Pts	Qualification
1	AFC Bournemouth (C, P)	22	21	1	0	100	7	+93	64	Promotion to FA WNL Premier Division
2	Moneyfields	22	15	3	4	63	25	+38	48	
3	Swindon Town	22	13	5	4	63	26	+37	44	
4	Bristol Rovers	22	14	1	7	40	25	+15	43	
5	Worthing	22	12	2	8	51	41	+10	38	
6	Keynsham Town	22	10	2	10	37	41	−4	32	
7	Bridgwater United	22	8	3	11	31	42	−11	27	
8	Maidenhead United	22	7	2	13	27	48	−21	23	
9	Abingdon United	22	6	3	13	31	42	−11	21	
10	Bournemouth Sports	22	5	5	12	19	49	−30	20	
11	Portishead Town	22	3	4	15	19	60	−41	13	
12	Southampton Women's (R)	22	2	1	19	10	85	−75	6 (Note: On 10 October 2024, Southampton Women's were deducted 1 point for failing to fulfil their fixture against Bristol Rovers on 25 August 2024. As a result, Southampton received a suspended £250 fine and the game was rescheduled.)	Relegation to regional league level

Source: The Football Association
Rules for classification: 1) Points; 2) Goal difference; 3) Number of goals scored
(C) Champions; (P) Promoted; (R) Relegated

== See also ==
- 2024–25 FA Women's National League Cup
- 2024–25 FA Women's National League Plate
- 2024–25 Women's Super League (tier 1)
- 2024–25 Women's Championship (tier 2)
