= 2025–26 FA Women's National League =

FA Women's National League
- Season: 2025–26
- Dates: 17 August 2025 – 26 April 2026

The 2025–26 FA Women's National League is the 35th season of the competition, and the eighth since a restructure and rebranding of the top four tiers of English football by The Football Association. Starting in 1991, it was previously known as the FA Women's Premier League. It sits at the third and fourth levels of the women's football pyramid, below the Women's Super League 2 and above the eight regional football leagues.

The league features six regional divisions: the Northern and Southern Premier divisions at level three of the pyramid, and Division One North, Midlands, South East, and South West at the fourth level. The league consists of 72 teams, divided into six divisions of 12 each.

Following the decision to expand the Women's Super League, the National League announced a third team will be promoted to the WSL2 for the 2026–27 season. In addition to the winners of the Northern and Southern Divisions gaining promotion, the two second placed teams will face each other in a one game play-off to decide the third team promoted. Two additional teams will also be promoted from Division One, following the same format, with the second placed teams of Division One North and Midlands facing each other, and the two second placed teams of Division One South East and South West facing each other.

== Premier Division ==
=== Northern Premier Division ===
FA Women's National League Northern Premier Division
- Season: 2025–26
- Champions: Burnley
- Promoted: Burnley; Wolverhampton Wanderers
- Relegated: Halifax; Sporting Khalsa
- Matches: 132
- Goals: 409 (3.1 per match)
- Top goalscorer: Amber Hughes (Wolverhampton Wanderers); Millie Ravening (Burnley) (18 goals)
- Biggest home win: Rugby Borough 6–0 Derby County (17 August 2025)
- Biggest away win: Loughborough Lightning 0–7 Burnley (8 February 2026)
- Highest scoring: Hull City 1–7 Wolverhampton Wanderers (21 September 2025)
- All statistics correct as of 25 February 2026.

Changes from last season:

- Nottingham Forest were promoted to the WSL 2 as WNL North champions.
- Middlesbrough were promoted from Division One North as champions.
- Loughborough Lightning were promoted from Division One Midlands as champions.
- Stourbridge were relegated to Division One Midlands.

Club	Home ground	Position 2024–25
Burnley	Lancashire County Ground, Leyland	4th
Derby County	Don Amott Arena, Derby	9th
Halifax	Horsfall Stadium, Bradford	11th
Hull City	Easy Buy Stadium, Barton-upon-Humber	8th
Liverpool Feds	Jericho Lane, Liverpool	6th
Loughborough Lightning	Loughborough University Stadium, Loughborough	WNL D1 Midlands, 1st
Middlesbrough	Bishopton Road West, Stockton	WNL D1 North, 1st
Rugby Borough	Kilsby Lane, Rugby	5th
Sporting Khalsa	Guardian Warehousing Arena, Willenhall	10th
Stoke City	Wellbeing Park, Yarnfield	3rd
West Bromwich Albion	Valley Stadium, Redditch	7th
Wolverhampton Wanderers	New Bucks Head, Telford	2nd

Location of Northern Premier Division clubs for the 2025–26 season

==== League table ====
Pos	Team	Pld	W	D	L	GF	GA	GD	Pts	Qualification
1	Burnley (C, P)	22	20	2	0	63	5	+58	62	Promotion to WSL 2
2	Wolverhampton Wanderers (O, P)	22	20	1	1	70	10	+60	61	Promotion play-off
3	Rugby Borough	22	12	5	5	43	27	+16	41	
4	Stoke City	22	10	3	9	36	31	+5	33	
5	Middlesbrough	22	8	7	7	29	30	−1	31	
6	West Bromwich Albion	22	9	4	9	29	31	−2	31	
7	Liverpool Feds	22	7	5	10	44	45	−1	26	
8	Derby County	22	6	4	12	18	39	−21	22	
9	Hull City	22	5	5	12	23	54	−31	20	
10	Loughborough Lightning	22	4	7	11	21	43	−22	19	
11	Halifax (R)	22	4	4	14	15	38	−23	16	Relegation to FA WNL Division One
12	Sporting Khalsa (R)	22	3	1	18	18	56	−38	10	Relegation to FA WNL Division One

Source: FA Women's National League
Rules for classification: 1) Points; 2) Goal difference; 3) Number of goals scored
(C) Champions; (O) Play-off winners; (P) Promoted; (R) Relegated

==== Results ====
Home \ Away	BUR	DER	HFX	HUL	LIV	LOU	MID	RUG	SPK	STK	WBA	WOL
Burnley	—	2–0	2–0	3–0	3–2	5–0	5–0	5–0	3–0	3–0	3–0	1–0
Derby County	0–3	—	2–0	3–0	1–1	1–2	0–4	0–1	1–2	1–2	0–3	0–2
Halifax	0–0	2–2	—	2–0	0–1	1–1		0–5	0–2	2–0	0–1	0–2
Hull City	0–7	1–1	1–0	—	1–3	0–1	2–2	0–4	2–1	1–3	4–1	1–7
Liverpool Feds	0–2	0–1	4–1	4–1	—	4–1	1–4	3–3	5–0	2–3	2–3	0–4
Loughborough Lightning	0–7	0–1	1–1	0–2	2–2	—	0–0	0–2	6–0	1–0	1–1	0–5
Middlesbrough	1–3	1–0	2–1	1–2	1–1	3–1	—	0–0	2–0	1–2	0–0	0–3
Rugby Borough	0–1	6–0	1–0	1–1	2–2	2–0	1–1	—	2–1	3–1	3–1	2–3
Sporting Khalsa	1–2	0–1	1–2	2–2	1–2	1–0	1–2	2–3	—	0–2	1–3	0–3
Stoke City	1–2	1–1	4–0	1–1	3–2	2–2	2–0	0–1	3–1	—	3–0	1–3
West Bromwich Albion	0–1	0–2	0–1	2–1	3–2	0–0	1–1	2–1	6–0	2–1	—	0–3
Wolverhampton Wanderers	0–0	6–0	3–0	5–0	5–1	3–2	2–0	4–0	4–1	2–1	1–0	—

Updated to match(es) played on 26 April 2026. Source: ,
Legend: Blue = home team win; Yellow = draw; Red = away team win.

=== Southern Premier Division ===
FA Women's National League Southern Premier Division
- Season: 2025–26
- Champions: Watford
- Promoted: Watford
- Relegated: Billericay Town; Gwalia United
- Matches: 132
- Goals: 502 (3.8 per match)
- Top goalscorer: Madison Perry (Watford) (22 goals)
- Biggest home win: Oxford United 10–0 Billericay Town (12 October 2025)
- Biggest away win: Billericay Town 0–9 Plymouth Argyle (25 January 2026); Billericay Town 1–10 Hashtag United (18 February 2026)
- Highest scoring: Billericay Town 1–10 Hashtag United (18 February 2026)
- All statistics correct as of 25 February 2026.

Changes from last season:

- Ipswich Town were promoted to WSL 2 as WNL South champions.
- Real Bedford were promoted from Division One South East as champions.
- AFC Bournemouth were promoted from Division One South West as champions.
- Milton Keynes Dons were relegated to Division One South East.

Club	Home ground	Position 2024–25
AFC Bournemouth	Long Lane, Ringwood	WNL D1 South West, 1st
AFC Wimbledon	Imperial Fields, Morden	7th
Billericay Town	New Lodge, Billericay	11th
Cheltenham Town	Kayte Lane, Bishop's Cleeve	8th
Exeter City	Coach Road, Newton Abbot	4th
Gwalia United	Newport Stadium, Newport	9th
Hashtag United	Parkside, Aveley	2nd
Lewes	The Dripping Pan, Lewes	6th
Oxford United	Marsh Lane, Marston	5th
Plymouth Argyle	Home Park, Plymouth	10th
Real Bedford	McMullen Park, Bedford	WNL D1 South East, 1st
Watford	Orbital Fasteners Stadium, Kings Langley	3rd

Location of Southern Premier Division clubs for the 2025–26 season

==== League table ====
Pos	Team	Pld	W	D	L	GF	GA	GD	Pts	Qualification
1	Watford (C, P)	22	17	2	3	80	24	+56	53	Promotion to WSL 2
2	Plymouth Argyle	22	16	4	2	61	11	+50	52	Promotion play-off
3	AFC Bournemouth	22	14	4	4	61	20	+41	46	
4	Oxford United	22	12	3	7	44	26	+18	39	
5	Lewes	22	12	1	9	46	27	+19	37	
6	Real Bedford	22	9	3	10	41	34	+7	30	
7	Exeter City	22	9	3	10	41	35	+6	30	
8	Cheltenham Town	22	7	3	12	31	46	−15	24	
9	Hashtag United	22	6	5	11	34	38	−4	23	
10	AFC Wimbledon	22	6	4	12	30	48	−18	22	
11	Gwalia United (R)	22	6	4	12	28	46	−18	22	Relegation to FA WNL Division One
12	Billericay Town (R)	22	0	0	22	5	147	−142	0	Relegation to FA WNL Division One

Source: FA Women's National League
Rules for classification: 1) Points; 2) Goal difference; 3) Number of goals scored
(C) Champions; (P) Promoted; (R) Relegated

==== Results ====
Home \ Away	AFB	WIM	BIL	CHL	EXE	GWA	HSH	LEW	OXF	PLY	BED	WAT
AFC Bournemouth	—	5–1	7–0	2–0	1–1	2–0	1–1	2–1	2–1	1–2	1–2	3–2
AFC Wimbledon	0–5	—	4–0	1–2	2–0	0–1	3–2	2–1	2–3	0–2	1–2	1–2
Billericay Town	0–8	1–3	—	0–5	0–7	1–8	1–10	1–4	0–6	0–9	0–6	0–14
Cheltenham Town	0–6	2–2	3–0	—	0–2	2–2	1–2	2–1	1–0	0–2	1–5	3–4
Exeter City	2–2	2–0	6–0	0–4	—	2–1	6–0	1–2	1–2	1–1	2–1	1–4
Gwalia United	0–3	5–0	2–1	1–1	1–6	—	1–0	2–3	0–1	0–0	0–1	1–3
Hashtag United	1–2	2–2	7–0	1–0	0–1	0–0	—	1–0	1–1	1–2	0–0	1–6
Lewes	2–0	0–3	8–0	6–0	4–0	4–0	3–1	—	0–1	0–4	2–0	0–0
Oxford United	1–0	1–1	10–0	2–0	1–0	4–1	2–0	2–0	—	0–1	2–2	0–2
Plymouth Argyle	0–0	1–1	9–0	3–0	2–0	5–1	3–0	2–0	5–0	—	3–0	1–3
Real Bedford	1–4	5–1	6–0	1–4	2–0	0–1	0–2	1–2	3–1	1–4	—	1–2
Watford	2–4	4–0	5–0	3–0	5–0	7–0	3–1	2–3	4–3	1–0	1–1	—

Updated to match(es) played on 12 April 2026. Source:
Legend: Blue = home team win; Yellow = draw; Red = away team win.

=== Promotion play-off ===
4 May 2026	Wolverhampton Wanderers	1–0	Plymouth Argyle	Burton upon Trent
13:00	Greengrass 64'	Report		Stadium: Pirelli Stadium

== Division One ==
=== Division One North ===
FA Women's National League Division One North
- Season: 2025–26
- Champions: Huddersfield Town
- Promoted: Huddersfield Town
- Relegated: Blackburn Rovers; Doncaster Rovers Belles
- Matches: 132
- Goals: 421 (3.19 per match)
- Top goalscorer: Bianca Owens (Norton & Stockton Ancients) (18 goals)
- Biggest home win: Leeds United 7–0 Blackburn Rovers (21 September 2025)
- Biggest away win: Norton & Stockton Ancients 0–5 Huddersfield Town (21 September 2025)
- Highest scoring: Chorley 6–2 Blackburn Rovers (30 October 2025); Huddersfield Town 7–1 York City (31 August 2025)
- All statistics correct as of 27 December 2025.

Changes from last season:

- AFC Fylde were relegated to North West Women's Regional Football League.
- Barnsley F.C. withdrew from the league due to financial issues.
- Blackburn Rovers were administratively relegated from Women's Championship after failing to meet licensing criteria.
- Chester-le-Street Town were promoted from North East Regional Women's Football League as champions.
- Middlesbrough were promoted to Northern Premier Division as Division One North champions.
- Wythenshawe were promoted from North West Women's Regional Football League as champions.

Club	Home ground	Position 2024–25
Blackburn Rovers	Shawbridge, Clitheroe	Championship, 10th
Cheadle Town Stingers	Park Road Stadium, Cheadle	2nd
Chester-le-Street Town	Moor Park House, Chester-le-Street	NERWFL, 1st
Chorley	Jim Fowlers Memorial Ground, Euxton	3rd
Doncaster Rovers Belles	Eco-Power Stadium, Doncaster	11th
Durham Cestria	The Graham Sports Centre, Durham	6th
Huddersfield Town	The Stafflex Arena, Kirkburton	5th
Leeds United	Bannister Prentice Stadium, Garforth	4th
Norton & Stockton Ancients	Station Road, Norton, County Durham	9th
Stockport County	Stockport Sports Village, Stockport	7th
Wythenshawe	Hollyhedge Park Community Stadium, Sharston	NWWRFL, 1st
York City	University of York Sports Centre, York	10th

Location of Division One North clubs for the 2025–26 season

==== League table ====
Pos	Team	Pld	W	D	L	GF	GA	GD	Pts	Qualification
1	Huddersfield Town (C, P)	22	17	2	3	59	11	+48	51 (Note: Huddersfield Town were deducted two points for fielding an ineligible player. They were also fined £200.)	Promotion to Premier Division
2	Cheadle Town Stingers	22	15	4	3	36	12	+24	49	Promotion play-off
3	Leeds United	22	13	6	3	49	19	+30	45	
4	Wythenshawe	22	14	1	7	46	29	+17	43	
5	Durham Cestria	22	12	3	7	42	30	+12	39	
6	Norton & Stockton Ancients	22	10	5	7	35	33	+2	35	
7	Stockport County	22	9	4	9	44	31	+13	31	
8	Chorley	22	8	6	8	32	36	−4	30	
9	Chester-le-Street Town	22	4	4	14	26	40	−14	16	
10	York City	22	4	3	15	17	65	−48	15	
11	Doncaster Rovers Belles (R)	22	3	2	17	17	44	−27	11	Relegation to regional leagues
12	Blackburn Rovers (R)	22	2	2	18	18	71	−53	8	Relegation to regional leagues

Source: The Football Association
Rules for classification: 1) Points; 2) Goal difference; 3) Number of goals scored
(C) Champions; (P) Promoted; (R) Relegated

==== Results ====
Home \ Away	BLA	CTS	CLS	CHO	DON	DUR	HUD	LEE	NOR	STO	WYT	YOR
Blackburn Rovers	—	0–2	1–2	1–5	2–1	1–5	1–9	1–3	1–2	1–4	0–3	0–3
Cheadle Town Stingers	2–2	—	1–0	0–0	3–0	0–1	2–1	1–1	4–0	1–0	1–0	6–0
Chester-Le-Street Town	2–3	0–2	—	2–2	4–0	2–2	0–2	0–2	0–1	3–3	1–3	0–1
Chorley	6–2	0–2	2–1	—	1–0	4–1	0–0	0–4	2–2	2–3	0–3	0–0
Doncaster Rovers Belles	1–0	0–1	0–1	0–2	—	1–2	0–1	1–1	1–2	2–2	1–2	5–0
Durham Cestria	1–0	0–3	3–0	6–1	4–0	—	0–3	1–2	2–2	2–1	3–2	2–0
Huddersfield Town	3–2	4–0	4–1	3–0	3–0	1–0	—	0–1	0–0	2–0	1–3	7–1
Leeds United	7–0	0–1	3–2	1–1	4–0	1–1	0–1	—	1–2	3–0	2–1	2–0
Norton & Stockton Ancients	4–0	0–0	1–0	1–2	1–0	1–2	0–5	2–3	—	2–0	1–4	6–1
Stockport County	4–0	0–1	1–1	2–0	6–1	1–2	0–3	1–1	2–3	—	5–0	3–1
Wythenshawe	2–0	2–1	2–1	0–1	2–1	2–1	0–1	2–2	2–1	0–3	—	7–0
York City	0–0	1–2	1–3	2–1	0–2	2–1	0–5	1–5	1–1	0–3	2–4	—

Updated to match(es) played on 12 April 2026. Source: ,
Legend: Blue = home team win; Yellow = draw; Red = away team win.

=== Division One Midlands ===
FA Women's National League Division One Midlands
- Season: 2025–26
- Champions: Peterborough United
- Promoted: Peterborough United; Boldmere St. Michaels
- Relegated: Stourbridge; Lincoln United
- Matches: 132
- Goals: 478 (3.62 per match)
- Top goalscorer: Gemma Fraser (Leafield Athletic) (17 goals)
- Biggest home win: Peterborough United 8–0 Lincoln United (24 August 2025)
- Biggest away win: Lincoln United 0–7 Barnsley Women's (31 August 2025)
- Highest scoring: Northampton Town 3–7 Peterborough United (30 October 2025)
- All statistics correct as of 25 February 2026.

Changes from last season:

- Kidderminster Harriers were promoted from West Midlands Regional Women's Football League as champions.
- Sheffield F.C. were promoted from East Midlands Regional Women's Football League as champions.
- Stourbridge were relegated from Northern Premier Division.
- Loughborough Lightning were promoted to Northern Premier Division as champions.
- Lincoln City were relegated to East Midlands Regional Women's Football League.
- Solihull Moors were relegated to West Midlands Regional Women's Football League.

Club	Home ground	Position 2024–25
Barnsley Women's	Sheffield Olympic Legacy Park, Sheffield	6th
Boldmere St. Michaels	The Amber Arena and Community Stadium, Sutton Coldfield	5th
Kidderminster Harriers	King George V Playing Fields, Droitwich	WMRWFL, 1st
Leafield Athletic	Castle Vale Stadium, Birmingham	4th
Lincoln United	Ashby Avenue, Lincoln	9th
Northampton Town	O'Riordan Bond Stadium, Moulton	2nd
Notts County	Coronation Park, Eastwood	7th
Peterborough United	PIMS Park, Peterborough	3rd
Sheffield F.C.	Home of Football Stadium, Dronfield	EMRWFL, 1st
Stourbridge	War Memorial Athletic Ground, Amblecote	WNL Premier North, 12th
Sutton Coldfield Town	Central Ground, Sutton Coldfield	8th
Worcester City	Sixways Stadium, Worcester	10th

Location of Division One Midlands clubs for the 2025–26 season

==== League table ====
Pos	Team	Pld	W	D	L	GF	GA	GD	Pts	Qualification
1	Peterborough United (C, P)	22	20	2	0	87	12	+75	62	Promotion to Premier Division
2	Boldmere St. Michaels (O, P)	22	18	0	4	63	24	+39	54	Promotion play-off
3	Leafield Athletic	22	17	1	4	60	21	+39	52	
4	Barnsley Women's	22	13	3	6	52	25	+27	42	
5	Worcester City	22	11	2	9	43	44	−1	35	
6	Sheffield F.C.	22	10	4	8	40	28	+12	34	
7	Northampton Town	22	7	3	12	20	32	−12	24	
8	Notts County	22	6	3	13	37	38	−1	21	
9	Kidderminster Harriers	22	7	0	15	21	44	−23	21	
10	Sutton Coldfield Town	22	5	5	12	22	40	−18	20	
11	Stourbridge (R)	22	4	3	15	21	66	−45	15	Relegation to regional leagues
12	Lincoln United (R)	22	0	2	20	12	104	−92	2	Relegation to regional leagues

Source: The Football Association
Rules for classification: 1) Points; 2) Goal difference; 3) Number of goals scored
(C) Champions; (O) Play-off winners; (P) Promoted; (R) Relegated

==== Results ====
Home \ Away	BAR	BLD	KID	LEA	LNU	NHT	NOC	PTB	SHE	STO	SUT	WOR
Barnsley Women's	—	1–5	4–0	3–5	7–0	0–1	1–1	0–0	3–1	5–1	2–1	3–1
Boldmere St. Michaels	5–4	—	2–0	3–1	7–2	1–2	1–0	2–3	4–1	4–0	2–1	3–1
Kidderminster Harriers	0–3	1–5	—	1–3	4–2	0–1	2–1	0–5	0–1	1–0	1–3	0–2
Leafield Athletic	0–2	1–2	2–1	—	6–1	1–0	1–0	0–0	2–1	4–1	4–0	7–2
Lincoln United	0–7	0–3	0–4	0–10	—	1–1	0–5	0–6	1–5	0–1	1–3	1–7
Northampton Town	0–1	0–1	2–1	0–1	1–0	—	2–1	3–7	2–2	0–1	0–1	1–2
Notts County	1–2	0–2	1–2	2–4	4–0	3–0	—	1–4	3–3	3–5	3–0	0–4
Peterborough United	1–0	3–1	4–0	2–0	8–0	3–0	3–0	—	2–0	7–0	1–0	7–2
Sheffield F.C.	0–2	1–0	1–0	0–1	6–1	1–0	0–0	0–2	—	5–1	1–1	1–2
Stourbridge	1–2	1–3	0–1	0–4	4–0	1–1	0–5	0–8	0–2	—	1–1	1–1
Sutton Coldfield Town	0–0	0–3	1–2	0–2	2–2	2–0	0–2	1–5	0–4	4–2	—	1–1
Worcester City	1–0	1–4	1–0	0–1	3–0	1–3	2–1	2–6	1–4	5–0	1–0	—

Updated to match(es) played on 26 April 2026. Source: ,
Legend: Blue = home team win; Yellow = draw; Red = away team win.

=== Division One South East ===
FA Women's National League Division One South East
- Season: 2025–26
- Champions: Fulham
- Promoted: Fulham; Norwich City
- Relegated: AFC Sudbury; Chesham United
- Matches: 132
- Goals: 475 (3.6 per match)
- Top goalscorer: Grace Riglar (Norwich City) (18 goals)
- Biggest home win: Norwich City 9–2 Chesham United (2 November 2025); Milton Keynes Dons 7–0 Chesham United (30 November 2025)
- Biggest away win: Milton Keynes Dons 0–7 Queens Park Rangers (17 August 2025)
- Highest scoring: Norwich City 9–2 Chesham United (2 November 2025)
- All statistics correct as of 23 November 2025.

Changes from last season:

- Ashford Town were relegated to London and South East Women's Regional Football League.
- Atlético London (formerly London Seaward) were relegated to Eastern Region Women's Football League.
- Fulham were promoted from London and South East Women's Regional Football League as champions.
- Luton Town were promoted from Eastern Region Women's Football League as champions.
- Milton Keynes Dons were relegated from Southern Premier Division.
- Real Bedford were promoted to Southern Premier Division as Division One South East champions.

Club	Home ground	Position 2024–25
Actonians	Rectory Park, Northolt	6th
AFC Sudbury	King's Marsh Stadium, Sudbury	7th
Cambridge United	Rowley Park, St Neots	9th
Chatham Town	Bauvill Stadium, Chatham	3rd
Chesham United	The Meadow, Chesham	10th
Dulwich Hamlet	Champion Hill, East Dulwich	8th
Fulham	Motspur Park, New Malden	LSEWRFL, 1st
London Bees	The Hive, Edgware	4th
Luton Town	Sharpenhoe Road, Barton-le-Clay	ERWFL, 1st
Milton Keynes Dons	Stadium MK, Milton Keynes	WNL South, 12th
Norwich City	The Nest, Horsford	2nd
Queens Park Rangers	Powerday Stadium, Perivale	5th

Location of Division One South East clubs for the 2025–26 season

==== League table ====
Pos	Team	Pld	W	D	L	GF	GA	GD	Pts	Qualification
1	Fulham (C, P)	22	20	2	0	73	18	+55	62	Promotion to Premier Division
2	Norwich City (O, P)	22	18	1	3	71	23	+48	55	Promotion play-off
3	Chatham Town	22	14	3	5	56	20	+36	45	
4	London Bees	22	12	3	7	53	32	+21	39	
5	Actonians	22	11	2	9	32	32	0	35	
6	Queens Park Rangers	22	8	7	7	38	26	+12	31	
7	Luton Town	22	7	6	9	29	42	−13	27	
8	Milton Keynes Dons	22	7	4	11	32	50	−18	25	
9	Dulwich Hamlet	22	7	3	12	19	38	−19	24	
10	Cambridge United	22	5	3	14	29	45	−16	18	
11	AFC Sudbury (R)	22	2	4	16	29	68	−39	9 (Note: AFC Sudbury were deducted one point for failure to fulfil their fixture versus Chatham Town on 21 December 2025. As a result, the club were also charged £750, £250 of which is suspended, and the game was ordered to be replayed.)	Relegation to regional leagues
12	Chesham United (R)	22	1	2	19	14	81	−67	5	Relegation to regional leagues

Source: The Football Association
Rules for classification: 1) Points; 2) Goal difference; 3) Number of goals scored
(C) Champions; (O) Play-off winners; (P) Promoted; (R) Relegated

==== Results ====
Home \ Away	ACT	SUD	CAM	CHA	CHE	DUL	FUL	LNB	LUT	MKD	NOR	QPR
Actonians	—	4–2	2–2	1–2	1–0	3–0	2–3	2–1	1–2	0–1	0–3	0–0
AFC Sudbury	1–2	—	0–1	1–5	1–2	4–1	0–6	0–0	3–4	1–1	2–5	2–3
Cambridge United	0–1	3–0	—	0–3	2–2	3–1	1–4	1–3	5–0	0–3	1–2	1–3
Chatham Town	3–0	5–0	2–0	—	4–0	6–0	1–2	6–1	1–0	3–2	2–3	0–1
Chesham United	1–5	1–1	1–3	0–4	—	1–2	0–6	0–4	1–4	1–2	0–2	0–5
Dulwich Hamlet	0–1	1–0	1–0	0–0	2–0	—	0–1	1–3	1–1	1–0	1–4	2–1
Fulham	5–0	4–2	2–1	3–1	5–1	2–2	—	5–0	3–0	3–0	4–2	1–0
London Bees	1–2	8–2	3–1	0–0	7–1	2–0	2–3	—	5–1	4–1	1–2	2–0
Luton Town	0–4	3–3	1–0	0–3	3–0	3–1	0–1	0–1	—	2–2	1–1	0–0
Milton Keynes Dons	0–1	5–1	2–2	3–1	7–0	1–0	0–6	0–4	0–2	—	0–4	0–7
Norwich City	4–0	3–1	6–1	1–2	9–2	1–0	2–3	3–0	4–0	5–0	—	3–2
Queens Park Rangers	1–0	1–2	3–1	2–2	2–0	1–2	1–1	1–1	2–2	2–2	0–2	—

Updated to match(es) played on 26 April 2026. Source: ,
Legend: Blue = home team win; Yellow = draw; Red = away team win.

=== Division One South West ===
FA Women's National League Division One South West
- Season: 2025–26
- Champions: Swindon Town
- Promoted: Swindon Town
- Relegated: Portishead Town; Worthing
- Matches: 132
- Goals: 501 (3.8 per match)
- Top goalscorer: Annabelle Colston (Swindon Town) (29 goals)
- Biggest home win: Bristol Rovers 10–0 Worthing (25 January 2026)
- Biggest away win: Worthing 0–9 Bristol Rovers (14 September 2025)
- Highest scoring: Moneyfields 9–2 Abingdon United (14 September 2025)
- All statistics correct as of 25 February 2026.

Changes from last season:

- AFC Bournemouth were promoted to Southern Premier Division as Division One South West champions.
- Ascot United were promoted from Southern Region Women's Football League as champions.
- Marine Academy Plymouth were promoted from South West Regional Women's Football League as champions.
- Southampton Women's were relegated to Southern Region Women's Football League.

Club	Home ground	Position 2024–25
Abingdon United	Northcourt Stadium, Abingdon	9th
Ascot United	The Racecourse Ground, Ascot	SRWFL, 1st
Bournemouth Sports	Chapel Gate, Hurn	10th
Bridgwater United	Fairfax Park, Bridgwater	7th
Bristol Rovers	Memorial Stadium, Bristol	4th
Keynsham Town	Crown Field, Keynsham	6th
Maidenhead United	York Road, Maidenhead	8th
Marine Academy Plymouth	Erme Valley, Ivybridge	SWRWFL, 1st
Moneyfields	Moneyfields Sports Ground, Portsmouth	2nd
Portishead Town	Bristol Road, Portishead	11th
Swindon Town	County Ground, Swindon	3rd
Worthing	Woodside Road, Worthing	5th

Location of Division One South West clubs for the 2025–26 season

==== League table ====
Pos	Team	Pld	W	D	L	GF	GA	GD	Pts	Qualification
1	Swindon Town (C, P)	22	20	0	2	83	13	+70	60	Promotion to Premier Division
2	Moneyfields	22	19	1	2	86	13	+73	58	Promotion play-off
3	Bridgwater United	22	14	4	4	48	22	+26	46	
4	Bristol Rovers	22	13	4	5	56	23	+33	43	
5	Maidenhead United	22	7	8	7	37	35	+2	29	
6	Abingdon United	22	8	5	9	33	46	−13	29	
7	Ascot United	22	7	6	9	28	28	0	27	
8	Marine Academy Plymouth	22	6	4	12	30	49	−19	22	
9	Keynsham Town	22	6	4	12	30	57	−27	22	
10	Bournemouth Sports	22	6	2	14	25	52	−27	20	
11	Portishead Town (R)	22	4	1	17	23	64	−41	13	Relegation to regional leagues
12	Worthing (R)	22	2	1	19	22	99	−77	7	Relegation to regional leagues

Source: The Football Association
Rules for classification: 1) Points; 2) Goal difference; 3) Number of goals scored
(C) Champions; (P) Promoted; (R) Relegated

==== Results ====
Home \ Away	ABD	ASC	BSP	BWU	BRI	KEY	MAI	MAP	MON	POR	SWI	WOR
Abingdon United	—	1–1	4–2	1–2	1–1	4–1	0–0	2–2	0–5	1–0	1–6	4–0
Ascot United	0–2	—	0–1	0–3	0–1	0–3	1–1	3–0	1–1	1–0	1–2	5–1
Bournemouth Sports	1–4	0–2	—	3–0	0–3	1–1	2–0	2–1	1–3	0–1	0–4	2–1
Bridgwater United	3–1	1–1	4–0	—	0–0	3–2	1–1	4–3	0–2	3–0	0–3	3–0
Bristol Rovers	1–0	1–0	4–0	0–0	—	2–0	4–1	3–0	0–1	5–0	1–2	10–0
Keynsham Town	2–0	0–0	4–3	1–4	3–1	—	1–3	2–0	1–5	2–2	1–4	2–1
Maidenhead United	1–1	2–3	2–1	1–3	2–2	1–1	—	2–2	0–3	5–0	1–0	3–0
Marine Academy Plymouth	2–0	1–2	2–2	0–1	2–3	3–0	1–1	—	0–3	4–0	0–2	2–0
Moneyfields	9–2	2–0	7–0	3–1	8–0	6–0	3–0	5–0	—	1–0	1–2	10–2
Portishead Town	1–2	1–4	2–1	0–6	0–4	2–1	2–3	2–3	0–3	—	2–4	4–5
Swindon Town	5–0	1–0	2–1	0–1	3–1	8–0	4–1	10–0	2–1	4–0	—	5–0
Worthing	1–2	3–3	1–2	0–5	0–9	4–2	0–6	0–2	1–4	2–4	0–10	—

Updated to match(es) played on 26 April 2026. Source: ,
Legend: Blue = home team win; Yellow = draw; Red = away team win.

=== Promotion play-offs ===
2 May 2026	Boldmere St. Michaels	3–0	Cheadle Town Stingers	Burton-upon-Trent
13:00	Davies 7'; Cooper 28', 73'	Report		Stadium: Pirelli Stadium

3 May 2026	Norwich City	2–2 (6–5 p)	Moneyfields	Burton-upon-Trent
13:00	Kennard 6'; Riglar 12'	Report	Hall 21'; Jeal 44'	Stadium: Pirelli Stadium
	Penalties
	Riglar (penalty scored); Williams (penalty scored); Strauss (penalty missed); Symonds (penalty scored); Wilson (penalty scored); King (penalty scored); Kennard (penalty scored)		Pharaoh (penalty scored); Beard (penalty scored); Hall (penalty scored); Phelps (penalty missed); Albuery (penalty scored); Fox (penalty scored)

== Awards ==
=== Monthly awards ===
Month	Premier Division		Division One		Ref.
Month	Manager	Club	Manager	Club	Ref.
August	(England) Helen Bleazard	Bournemouth	(England) Dylan Wimbury	Cheadle Town Stingers	
September	(England) Renée Hector	Watford	(England) Steve Jaye	Fulham	
October	(England) Daniel McNamara	Wolverhampton Wanderers	(England) James Mulvihill	Wythenshawe	
November	(England) Lou Roberts	Burnley	(England) Graham Abercrombie	Sheffield F.C.	
December	(England) Helen Bleazard	Bournemouth	(England) Karl Watson	Moneyfields	
January	(England) Liam Gilbert	Oxford United	(England) Tash Tezgel	Leafield Athletic	
February	(England) Marie Hourihan	Plymouth Argyle	(England) Michael Third	Durham Cestria	

== See also ==
- 2025–26 FA Women's National League Cup
- 2025–26 FA Women's National League Plate
- 2025–26 Women's Super League (tier 1)
- 2025–26 Women's Super League 2 (tier 2)
