= Chloe Williams =

Chloe Williams may refer to:

- Chloe Williams (footballer) (born 2000), Wales international football midfielder
- Chloe Williams (golfer) (born 1995), Welsh Ladies European Tour golfer
- Chloe Williams (Left Behind) (née Steele), fictional character in the Left Behind franchise
