= Shannon Turner =

Shannon Turner may refer to:

- Shannon Turner (ice hockey), Canadian ice hockey player
- Shannon Turner (footballer), Northern Irish footballer
