= Emily Westwood =

Emily Westwood may refer to:

- Emily Westwood (footballer)
- Emily Westwood (badminton)
