= Notts County Women F.C. =

Current Notts County women's football club

Notts County Women FC
- Full name: Notts County Women Football Club
- Nickname: The Magpies
- Founded: May 2018
- Ground: Coronation Park, home of Eastwood C.F.C.
- Manager: Adam Dunleavy
- League: FA Women's National League Division One Midlands
- 2025–26: FA Women's National League Division One Midlands, 8th of 12
- Website: www.nottscountywomenfc.co.uk

Notts County Women F.C. founded in May 2018, is a women's football club based in Nottingham, England. They are currently playing in the FA Women's National League Division One Midlands. The club is an affiliate of the male football club Notts County F.C. They play their home games at Coronation Park, which is the home of Eastwood C.F.C. They previously played at Greenwich Avenue, Basford, which is the home of Basford United F.C.

Under the management of Adam Dunleavy and Adam Woolley they won promotion into the East Midlands Regional Women's Football League with an unbeaten league run stretching back to November 2018. On 28 March 2023, the team beat Mansfield Town Ladies and became league champions securing promotion to the FA Women's National League Division 1 Midlands.

== Background ==
Notts County Women have their origins as a successor to Notts County Ladies, whom were established in 2014 following the relocation of Lincoln Ladies and played in the FA Women's Super League. In 2017, two days before the start of the FA WSL Spring Series, Notts County Ladies folded as a result of £1 million needed to run the women's club and facing a winding up petition from HM Revenue and Customs over unpaid tax debts and a predicted £500,000 loss. Thirteen months later, the Notts County owner Alan Hardy announced they were reforming their women's team as Notts County Women. Despite this, Notts County Women state they are a separate club and make no claim to the history of Notts County Ladies. They would start at a regional level of the English football pyramid and initially planned to play at Ilkeston Town instead of Meadow Lane. However, they instead moved to play at Basford United's Greenwich Avenue. Despite this, they do occasionally play matches at Meadow Lane.

In their debut season in the 2023-24 FA Women's National League, Notts County Women finished in 10th and a point above the relegation zone. They also competed in the FA Women's National League Cup for the first time but lost in the First Round 6-0 to AFC Fylde Women. In 2024, Notts County Women announced they were moving to Eastwood's Coronation Park for the 2024-25 season.

== Reserves ==
Notts County Women Reserves were founded at the same time and entered step 7 of the English football pyramid. Due to the senior team getting promoted into the Women's National League, Notts County Women Reserves were moved to the FAWNL Reserve League.

== Seasons ==
Season	League										FA Cup	League Cup	
Season	League	Tier	P	W	D	L	GF	GA	Pts	Pos	FA Cup	Cup	Round
2018-19	East Midlands Division 1 South	6	18	13	2	3	55	26	41	2		East Midlands League Plate	F
2019–20 *	East Midlands Division 1 South	6	7	6	1	0	39	5	19		PR	East Midlands League Cup	SF*
2020–21 *											EPR		
2021-22	East Midlands Premier	5	18	7	3	8	41	34	24	6	R3Q	East Midlands League Cup	SF
2022-23	East Midlands Premier	5	16	14	1	1	38	20	43	1	R2Q	East Midlands League Cup	QF
2023-24	FAWNL D1 Midland	4	22	4	4	14	25	76	16	10	R3Q	FA WNL Cup	R1
2024-25	FAWNL D1 Midland	4	22	10	2	10	43	53	32	7	R1	FA WNL Plate	R1

Key:
This key provides a key to the abbreviations used in the Seasons table.

Definition	Abbreviation
Played	P
Games won	W
Games drawn	D
Games lost	L
Goals for	GF
Goals against	GA
Points	Pts
Final position	Pos
Women's National League	WNL

- The 2019–2020 and 2020–2021 seasons were abandoned due to the COVID-19 pandemic.

Champions	Relegated

== See also ==
- List of women's association football clubs in England and Wales
- Women's football in England
- List of women's association football clubs
