= Shannon Turner (footballer) =

Northern Irish footballer

Personal information
- Full name: Shannon Turner
- Date of birth: 8 September 1997 (age 29)
- Place of birth: Acocks Green, Birmingham, England
- Position: Goalkeeper

Team information
- Current team: West Bromwich Albion
- Number: 13

Youth career
- –2018: Coventry United

Senior career*
Years	Team	Apps	(Gls)
2018–2020	Birmingham City	0	(0)
2020–2021	Boldmere St Michaels	4	(0)
2021–2023	Wolverhampton Wanderers	42	(0)
2023–	West Bromwich Albion	0	(0)

International career
2016	Northern Ireland U19	3	(0)
2023–	Northern Ireland	3	(0)
- * Club domestic league appearances and goals

Shannon Turner (born 8 September 1997) became a goalkeeper for West Bromwich Albion in 2021 after leaving Wolverhampton Wanderers. Born in England, she has represented Northern Ireland at under-19 level. She was on the Northern Ireland squad for UEFA Women's Euro 2022.

== Life ==
Turner was born and brought up in Acocks Green, Birmingham in the West Midlands.

Turner has played for a number of leading English football clubs, including Birmingham City W.F.C.

She joined the Wolves in August 2021.

She was the only uncapped player named to play for the Northern Ireland women's national team for the UEFA Women's Euro in 2022. She qualified to play for Northern Ireland as some of her grandparents were from there. The other two goalkeepers in the squad are Jackie Burns and Becky Flaherty. Turner said that joining the squad had inspired her to try to be the top Northern Ireland goalkeeper.

She was in Cardiff in April 2023 in a friendly match against the Welsh team which ended in a 3-0 victory for Wales. There was a similar result in Dundee when Northern Irish team were beaten by the Scottish National team's three goals in another friendly match at Dens Park.

Northern Ireland were playing the Republic of Ireland in September 2023 and Turner was in goal. Northern Ireland lost by three goals to none. The next match was the Hungarian team in October 2023 at the Ménfői úti Stadion in Győr, Hungary and Jackie Burns was injured. Shannon deputised in a game that they lost 3-2, however Shannon's save of an attempt by Evelin Fenyvesi was described as superb.
