= Emily Westwood (footballer) =

English footballer

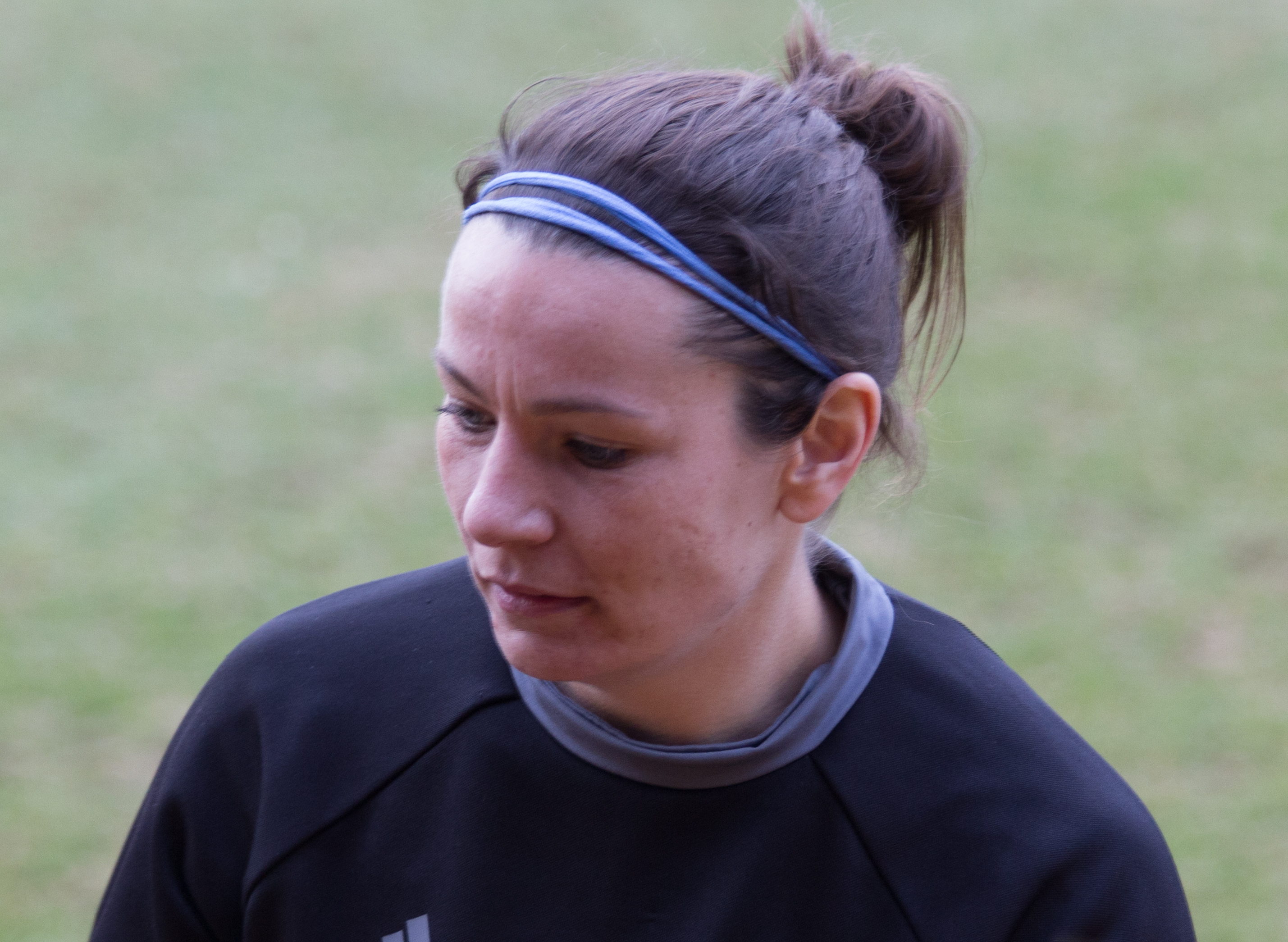
- Westwood in 2017

Personal information
- Full name: Emily Elizabeth Westwood
- Date of birth: 5 April 1984 (age 42)
- Place of birth: Dudley, England
- Position: Midfielder

Team information
- Current team: Birmingham City
- Number: 19

Youth career
- Wolves Women

Senior career*
Years	Team	Apps	(Gls)
2000–2005	Wolves Women		
2005–2010	Everton Ladies		
2010–2018	Birmingham City	58	(3)

International career^{‡}
2005–2010	England	32	(4)
- * Club domestic league appearances and goals as of 13:40, 27 January 2016 (UTC) ‡ National team caps and goals as of 26 September 2013 (UTC)

Emily Elizabeth Westwood (born 5 April 1984) is an English football player. She is an attacking midfielder for England women and Birmingham City Ladies, but has filled in as an emergency defender when needed. She has represented her country at U-16, U-19 and U-21 levels, as well as gaining full international honours, including appearances at the UEFA Women's Championships in 2005 and 2009.

In May 2009, Westwood was one of the first 17 female players to be given central contracts by The Football Association.

== Club career ==
In December 2010, Westwood was revealed to have signed for Birmingham City Ladies' FA WSL squad. With Birmingham she finished as runner-up in the 2011 and 2012 FA WSL seasons and won the 2011–12 FA Women's Cup. She also featured in two UEFA Women's Champions League campaigns. In January 2016 she extended her contract with the club.

== International career ==
Westwood made her senior debut for England in a 4–1 home friendly win over Italy in February 2005.

Westwood has England legacy number 159. The FA announced their legacy numbers scheme to honour the 50th anniversary of England’s inaugural international.

=== International goals ===
Scores and results list England's goal tally first.

#	Date	Venue	Opponent	Result	Competition	Scored
1	28 September 2008	Ďolíček, Prague	Czech Republic	5–1	UEFA Euro 2009 Qual.	1
2	11 February 2009	Larnaca	Finland	4–1	Friendly	1
3	10 March 2009	Larnaca	Scotland	3–0	Cyprus Cup	1
4	25 October 2009	Bloomfield Road, Blackpool	Malta	8–0	2011 FIFA World Cup Qual.	1

== Honours ==
- FA Women's Cup: 2

2009–10, 2011–12

- FA Women's Premier League Cup: 1

2007–08
