= Cheadle Town Stingers F.C. =

English football club

Cheadle Town Stingers
- Full name: Cheadle Town Stingers Football Club
- Founded: 1999 (as Manchester Stingers)
- Ground: Park Road Stadium
- Capacity: 1,200
- Chairman: Steve Taylor
- League: FA Women's National League Division One North
- 2025–26: FA Women's National League Division One North, 2nd of 12
Home colours	Away colours

Cheadle Town Stingers Football Club is an English women's football club. Founded in 1999, the club currently play in the FA Women's National League Division One North, with home games played at Cheadle Town's Park Road Stadium.

== History ==
The team was formed in 1999 under the guise of Manchester Stingers before they joined Cheadle Town F.C. under the rebranded name of Cheadle Town Stingers in 2020.

Dylan Wimbury coached the Stingers through the 2022–23 season, as they won both the Manchester FA Women’s Challenge Cup and the League’s Argyle Sports Kit North West Regional Cup. The Stingers also progressed through to the Second Round of the FA Women’s Cup before losing 1–0 to National League Premier side Burnley.

In season 2023–24, Stinger's finally achieved their ambition of winning the North West Women's Regional Football League Premier Division, finishing the season on 54 points and securing promotion to the FA Women's National League Division One North.

Stinger's debut season 2024–25 in the FA Women's National League Division One North saw them narrowly miss out on consecutive promotions, as they were pipped to the title on goal difference by Middlesbrough.

== Stadium ==
Park Road Stadium currently has an official capacity of 660; its record attendance is 1,700 for a match between Cheadle Town F.C. and Stockport County in August 1994. During the 1966 World Cup it was used by the Portugal national team as a training ground and has also had the honour of hosting a soccer school run by Brazilian legend Jairzinho during the summer of 1993.

It has a covered main stand on the west side of the pitch that can seat approximately 250 and contains the changing rooms underneath; the other three sides of the pitch are uncovered and surrounded by nothing more than a railing. Other facilities at the stadium include a clubhouse and a portable building that doubles up as the refreshments kiosk and hospitality room. The ground also includes a 2nd pitch adjacent to the main pitch, which is used by the clubs junior teams.

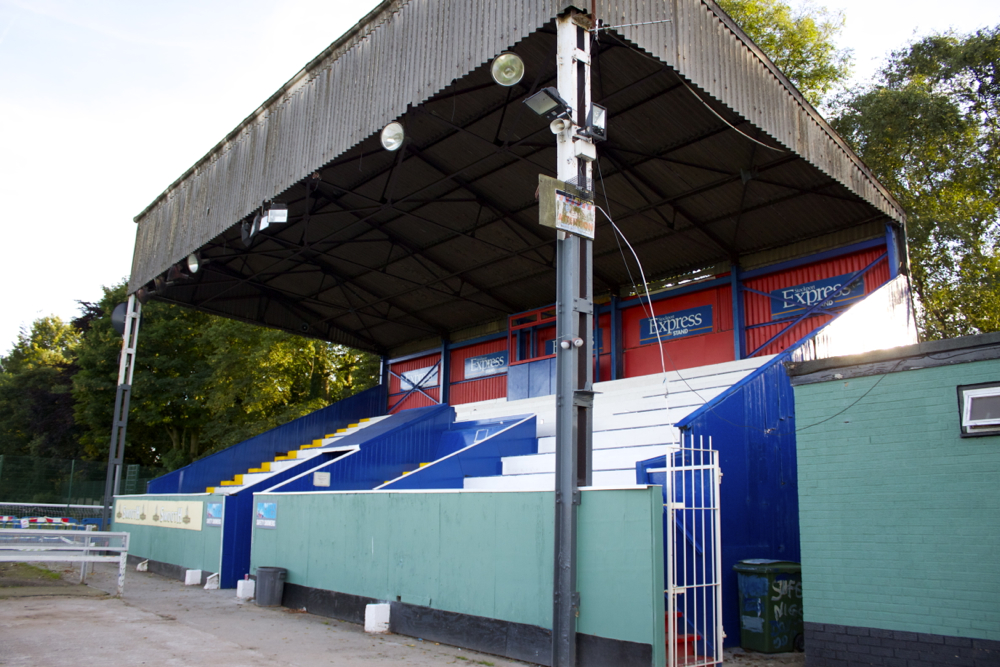
The Main Stand at Park Road Stadium

The view from the Main Stand, looking towards the Tennyson Road end

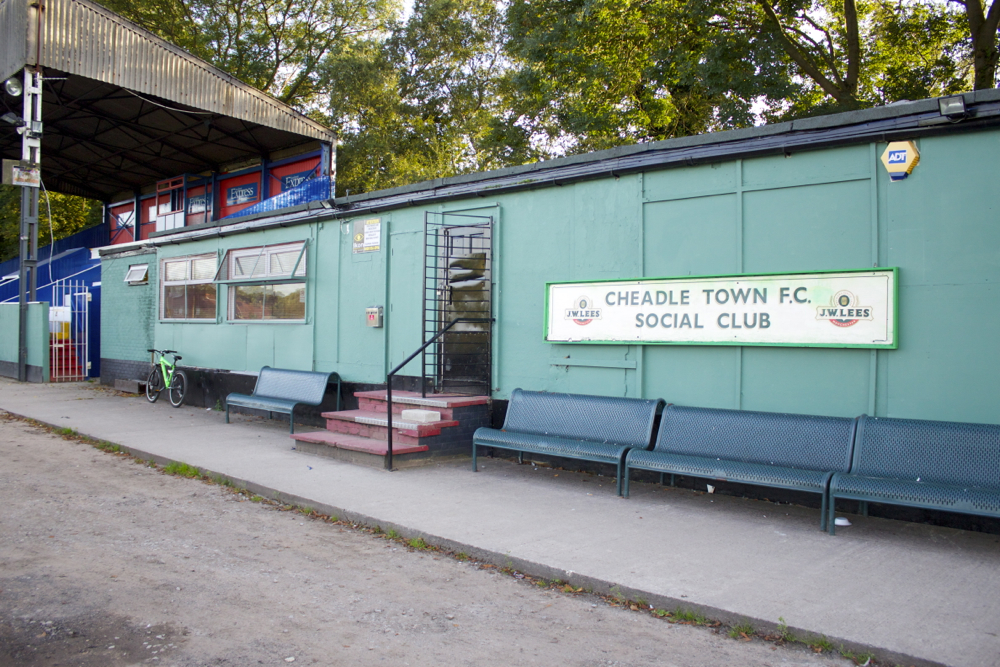
The old clubhouse, demolished in November 2014

In April 2014, the club announced that they had been awarded a £5,000 grant from Capital One as part of the company's Grounds For Improvement competition. This money was used for two new dugouts, a brand-new hard-standing surface directly from the tunnel to the dugout areas and new storage facilities. In the recent months the club has managed to install seats in its main stand and has begun rebuilding its club house after the old structure was demolished in November 2014. A new F.A standard 5 a-side pitch has also been built.

Further work on the stadium took place over the summer of 2018 thanks to the club winning a £50,000 Buildbase bursary. The clubhouse and changing rooms were refurbished and a new external cafe was opened.

== Management team ==
=== Current management team ===
Dylan Wimbury	(England)	Manager
Sam Cotterill	(England)	Assistant Manager
Ho Yee Leung	(Hong Kong)	Physio

== Honours ==
League

- North West Regional Premier Division (level 5)
  - Champions: 2023–24

Cup

- North West Regional League Cup
  - Winners: 2022–23
- FA Women's National League Plate
  - Winners: 2025–26
