= Wolverhampton Wanderers W.F.C. =

Wolverhampton Wanderers
- Full name: Wolverhampton Wanderers Girls' & Women's Football Club
- Nicknames: Wolves, She-Wolves, Wolfettes
- Founded: 1975; 51 years ago, as Heathfield Rovers
- Ground: New Bucks Head, Telford
- Capacity: 6,300 (2,200 seats)
- Coordinates: 52°41′51″N 2°30′5″W
- Chairperson: Jenny Wilkes
- Manager: Daniel McNamara
- League: Women's Super League 2
- 2025–26: FA Women's National League North, 2nd of 12 (promoted via play-offs)
- Website: http://www.wolves.co.uk/women
Home colours	Away colours	Third colours

Wolverhampton Wanderers Women's Football Club (/ˌwʊlvərˈhæmptən/ WUUL-vər-HAMP-tən), commonly known as Wolves Women, is an English women's football club affiliated with Wolverhampton Wanderers F.C. The club plays in the Womens Super League 2 for the 2026–27 season, after being promoted from the Womens National League.

== History ==
The club began playing in 1975 as Heathfield Rovers. After becoming Wolverhampton & Wednesbury Tube LFC the following season, they later settled on Wolverhampton Ladies. Just before 1993–94 the club got permission from Wolverhampton Wanderers to call themselves Wolverhampton Wanderers Women's Football Club and they were promoted to the FA Women's Premier League National Division that season. However, after two seasons they were relegated back to the Northern Division. Rachel Unitt came through the club's youth system and scored 12 goals in 1999–00 before signing for Everton the following season.

In May 2001 Dennis Mortimer was appointed manager. He challenged for promotion in his three seasons in charge but left in 2004, citing work commitments. In 2004–05 Wolves Women were runners-up to Sunderland but star players Emily Westwood and Amy McCann left for Everton during the summer and the club finished sixth in 2005–06.

Wolves Women were relegated to the Midland Combination after finishing 11th in 2006–07. In May 2008 the club was boosted by full affiliation with Wolverhampton Wanderers and a partnership with Wolverhampton College.

On Thursday 19 April 2012 Wolves Women won the Midland Combination Title gaining promotion back to the Northern Division for the 2012–13 Season. They followed that up with a 2–0 win over rivals Stoke in the League Cup Final to complete the League and cup double.

The 2014–15 season for Wolves Women was one to forget. They saw themselves relegated and bottom of the Northern Division. Wolves only managed 8 points from 22 games, and this saw a change in coaching staff at the end of the season.

At the start of the 2015–16 season, Steve Cullis was named manager and has been given the aim of promotion back into the Northern Division, as well as developing the youth section of the club. Wolves also withdrew their reserve team from the FA Women's Premier League Reserves (Midlands), the reserves had been playing in the WPL for the past 13 seasons.

In October 2016, Cullis moved to a new role of Technical Director for the club's Regional Talent Centre. Tim Dudding was named as his replacement as manager of the Senior squad. Dudding led a successful campaign, resulting in the club's promotion to the Northern Division.

After a poor start to the season Dan McNamara took over as First Team Manager in early 2018 and led the team in a relegation battle, just missing out on goal difference after a hard-fought campaign. After the restructure of the women's football pyramid this summer, the team found themselves in the new FA Women's National League Midlands Division One.

At the end of the 2020–21 season, Wolves were promoted via 'upward movement' to the FA Women's National League Northern Premier Division after going undefeated in two consecutive fourth tier campaigns, which were both declared null and void.

In the subsequent season (2021–22), Wolves were crowned Northern Premier Division champions and secured a place in the play-off with a chance for successive promotions, this time to the FA Women’s Championship, after beating Sheffield F.C. Ladies 2–0 with three games left until the end of the season. However, they would go on to lose the play-off 1–0 to Southern Division winners Southampton F.C.

The club made headlines at the end of the 2024–25 season, when the team found out after the final game that they would not have won promotion, even if they had ended the season as champions (which was possible going into the final game), because the club had decided not to apply for promotion, leaving the players ‘devastated’. Following this controversy, the club issued a statement to ‘restore trust’ and committed to applying for the promotion licence in future seasons.

In the 2025–26 season, Wolves were promoted to the Womens Super League 2 for the first time, after beating Plymouth Argyle 1–0 in the promotion play-off.

== Stadium ==
Wolves Women play their home games at the SEAH Stadium in Telford, the home of A.F.C. Telford United.

== Players ==
=== First team squad ===
As of 25 August 2026

Note: Flags indicate national team as defined under FIFA eligibility rules; some limited exceptions apply. Players may hold more than one non-FIFA nationality.

No.	Pos.	Nation	Player
1	GK	ENG	Alexandra Brooks
2	DF	ENG	Milly Robertson
3	DF	ENG	Anna Morphet (captain)
4	DF	ENG	Jasmine Matthews
5	DF	ENG	Georgia Marshall
6	DF	ENG	Lily Simkin
7	MF	ENG	Tammi George
8	MF	IRL	Layla Proctor
9	FW	ENG	Charlotte Greengrass
10	MF	IRL	Mel Filis
11	FW	ENG	Amber Hughes
14	MF	ENG	Melissa Lawley
15	MF	ENG	Hollie Olding
17	DF	ENG	Katie Johnson

No.	Pos.	Nation	Player
18	MF	ENG	Amy Sims
19	MF	ENG	Becky Anderson
20	FW	BEL	Yana Daniëls
21	FW	ENG	Ellen Jones
22	DF	ENG	Beth Roberts
23	FW	WAL	Olivia Francis
24	MF	WAL	Chloe Williams
27	DF	ENG	Abbi Jenner
30	GK	WAL	Cadi Doran
32	GK	ENG	Emily Orman (On loan from London City Lionesses)
33	DF	IRL	Tara O'Hanlon
36	FW	ENG	Louanne Worsey
—	MF	ENG	Merrick Will

=== Out on loan ===
Note: Flags indicate national team as defined under FIFA eligibility rules; some limited exceptions apply. Players may hold more than one non-FIFA nationality.

No.	Pos.	Nation	Player
25	MF	ENG	Amelia Hiscox (at Kidderminster Harriers until 30 June 2027)
31	FW	ENG	Skye Owen (at Boldmere St. Michaels until 30 June 2027)

=== Regional Talent Club ===
Wolves Girls Regional Talent Club is a Tier 3 Facility responsible for the delivery of elite girls' football development that commenced operations in June 2016. The Regional Talent Club's Technical Director is Jenna Burke-Martin.

=== Other teams ===
Wolverhampton Wanderers Development Team compete in the FA Women's National Reserve League Midland Division 2. Home games are played at Compton Park, The Wolves Training Ground

== Club officials ==
Coaching staff

- First Team Manager: Daniel McNamara
- First Team Coach: Lee Robinson
- First Team Goalkeeper Coach: Jon Ritchie
- First Team Match day support: Roy Williams
- First Team Physio: Luke Little
- First Team S&C Coach: Nathan Maxfield

Club Committee

- Owner: Wolverhampton Wanderers F.C.
- Chair: Jenny Wilkes
- Advisory Board Member: Anna Price
- Advisory Board Member: Claire Hakeman
- Advisory Board Member: Lynsey Hooper
- Advisory Board Member: Caren Davies
- Operations Lead: Emma Rowley

== Notable former players ==
Former Wolves players to have played at senior international level.

- (England) Emily Westwood
- (England) Rachel Unitt
- (England) Jody Handley
- (Northern Ireland) Amy McCann
- (Northern Ireland) Shannon Turner
- (Wales) Kerrie Manley

== Honours ==
League

- WFA National League Northern Division (level 2)
  - Champions: 1993–94
- Midland Combination Football League (level 3)
  - Champions: 2011–12
- FA National League Northern Premier Division (level 3)
  - Champions: 2021–22
  - Play-off Winners: 2025-26
- FA Premier League Division One Midlands (level 4)
  - Champions: 2016–17

Cup

- Midland Combination League Cup
  - Champions: 2011–12
