= Chloe Williams (footballer) =

Wales international footballer (born 2000)

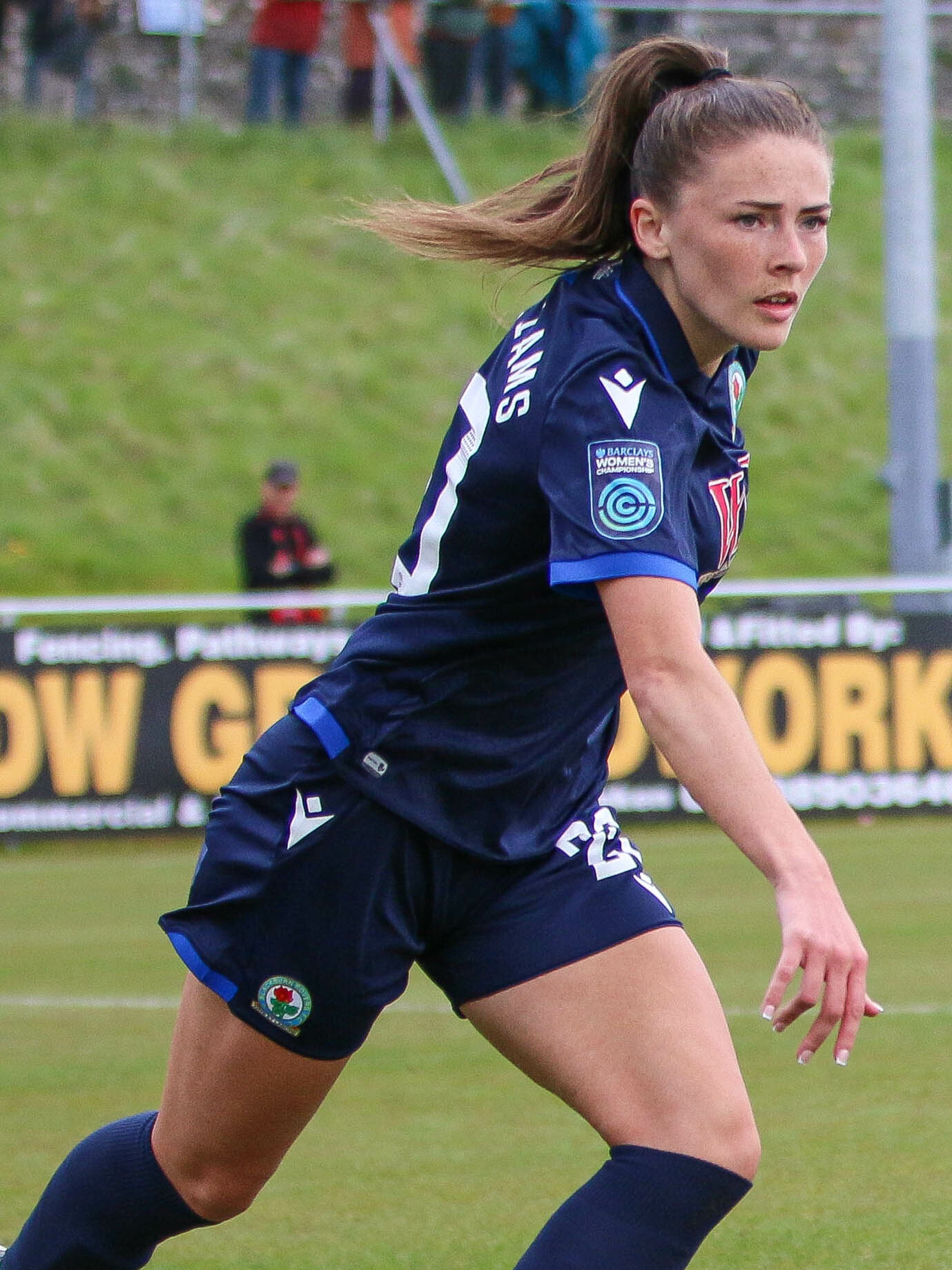
- Williams with Blackburn Rovers in 2023

Personal information
- Full name: Chloe Williams
- Date of birth: 22 December 2000 (age 25)
- Place of birth: Aberdare, South Wales
- Position: Midfielder

Team information
- Current team: Wolverhampton Wanderers
- Number: 24

Youth career
- 2015–2017: Wolverhampton Wanderers
- 2019–2021: Manchester United

Senior career*
Years	Team	Apps	(Gls)
2017–2019	Wolverhampton Wanderers	28	(6)
2019–2023	Manchester United	0	(0)
2021–2023	→ Blackburn Rovers (loan)	23	(1)
2023–2025	Blackburn Rovers	22	(0)
2025–	Wolverhampton Wanderers	8	(1)

International career^{‡}
2017–2018	Wales U19	10	(0)
2022–	Wales	2	(0)
- * Club domestic league appearances and goals as of 12:46, 17 November 2025 ‡ National team caps and goals as of 18 October 2026

Chloe Williams (born 22 December 2000) is a Welsh professional footballer who plays as a midfielder for Women's Super League 2 team Wolverhampton Wanderers. She also plays for the Wales national team.

== Club career ==
=== Wolverhampton Wanderers ===
Williams joined the Wolverhampton Wanderers academy aged 15 having started playing age 6 with local team Great Wyrley FC and later West Bromwich Albion. On 17 December 2017, Williams made her Wolves first team debut in an FA Cup second round defeat against Brighouse Town.

=== Manchester United ===
In July 2019, Williams joined FA WSL club Manchester United, initially as part of the club's under-21 squad but was named in a senior matchday squad for the first time on 20 October 2019 as an unused substitute for a League Cup group game against Manchester City.

==== Blackburn Rovers (loan) ====
On 14 November 2021, Williams joined Blackburn Rovers of the Women's Championship on loan for the season. On 14 August 2022, Williams returned to Blackburn Rovers for the 2022–23 season.

=== Blackburn Rovers ===
After spending two seasons on loan at Blackburn Rovers, the club announced Williams' permanent signing on a two-year deal on 27 June 2023.

=== Return to Wolverhampton Wanderers ===
On 15 August 2025, Williams returned to Wolverhampton Wanderers, 6 years after her departure. She was also reunited with manager Dan McNamara, who had previously coached her within the youth teams.

== International career ==
=== Youth ===
Eligible to play for both England and Wales, Williams first attended trials for the Welsh national team following encouragement from her college tutor in July 2017. She went on to represent Wales at under-19 level, appearing in 2018 and 2019 UEFA Women's Under-19 Championship qualification.

=== Senior ===
In November 2018, Williams received her first senior call-up for friendlies against Portugal but was later forced to withdraw. A year later, Williams received her first competitive senior call-up for the UEFA Women's Euro 2021 qualifier against Northern Ireland in November 2019. She made her senior debut on 19 February 2022 against Belgium in the 2022 Pinatar Cup.

== Career statistics ==
=== Club ===
As of 30 April 2023.

Appearances and goals by club, season and competition
Club	Season	League			FA Cup		League Cup (Note: Includes the FA Women's League Cup and FA Women's National League Cup)		Other		Total	
Club	Season	Division	Apps	Goals	Apps	Goals	Apps	Goals	Apps	Goals	Apps	Goals
Wolverhampton Wanderers	2017–18	WNL North	11	1	1	0	0	0	1 (Note: Birmingham FA Women's County Cup)	0	13	1
Wolverhampton Wanderers	2018–19	WNL D1 Midlands	17	5	1	0	2	0	1	0	21	5
Wolverhampton Wanderers	Total		28	6	2	0	2	0	2	0	34	6
Manchester United	2021–22	WSL	0	0	0	0	0	0	—		0	0
Blackburn Rovers (loan)	2021–22	Championship	5	0	1	0	0	0	—		6	0
Blackburn Rovers (loan)	2022–23	Championship	18	1	0	0	3	0	—		21	1
Blackburn Rovers (loan)	Total		23	1	1	0	3	0	0	0	27	1
Career total			51	7	3	0	5	0	2	0	61	7

=== International ===
Statistics accurate as of match played 13 October 2026.

Wales
Year	Apps	Goals
2022	1	0
2026	1	0
Total	2	0
