= Boldmere St. Michaels Women F.C. =

English football club

Coordinates: 52°32′30.300″N 1°50′32.690″W

- Founded: 1997
- Ground: Boldmere St. Michaels Stadium, Birmingham
- Manager: Karl Henry
- League: FA Women's National League North
- 2025–26: FA Women's National League Division One Midlands, 2nd of 12 (promoted via play-offs)

Boldmere St. Michaels Women F.C. is an English football club based in Boldmere, Birmingham, who are currently members of the FA Women's National League Division One Midlands.

== History ==
The club were founded in 1997 as Birmingham & West Midlands Ladies, and originally played at the Castle Vale Stadium.

At the start of the 2019–20 season, Birmingham & West Midlands Ladies entered a partnership with Boldmere St. Michaels, using their facilities and playing their home matches at the Trevor Brown Memorial Ground. This resulted in the club changing its name to Boldmere St. Michaels Women from the 2020–21 season.

Boldmere St Michaels were promoted at the end of the 2021–22 season as Champions of Division One Midlands. At the end of the 2022–23 season, they were relegated back to the Division One Midlands. After two mid-table finishes in 2024 and 2025, the club qualified for the promotion play-off in the 2025–26 season, facing off against Division One North side Cheadle Town Stingers at the Pirelli Stadium.
