= Lincoln United W.F.C. =

England women's football club

Lincoln United Women
- Full name: Lincoln United Football Club Women
- Nickname: The Whites
- Founded: 2017 (as Hykeham Town Ladies FC)
- Ground: Ashby Avenue, Lincoln
- Capacity: 2,714 (400 seated)
- First-team manager: Tom Padden
- League: FA Women's National League Division One Midlands
- 2025–26: FA Women's National League Division One Midlands, 12th of 12 (relegated)
- Website: Lincolnutd

Lincoln United Football Club Women is an English women's football club affiliated with Lincoln United Football Club. Based in Lincoln, the club plays in the FA Women's National League Division One Midlands, the fourth tier of women's domestic football in England, after winning promotion from the East Midlands Women's Regional Football League Premier Division in 2024.

Originally founded in 2017 as Hykeham Town Ladies FC, the club amalgamated with non-League football club Lincoln United Football Club in 2020 to form Lincoln United FC Women. In addition to the first team squad, the club operates a women's development squad competing in the Lincolnshire Women and Girls' County Football League, as well as youth teams at a variety of levels ranging from under-8 to under-18.

== History ==
Founded in 2017 as Hykeham Town Ladies FC, the club began its journey under manager Chris Funnell in the East Midlands Women's Regional Football League Division 1 North. Initially, the team played their home matches on a 3G artificial surface at Priory City of Lincoln Academy. In their inaugural 2017-18 season, they finished in second place, just behind Woodlands FC Ladies. The following season, they once again secured second place, this time trailing champions Boston United Ladies FC. The team's determination paid off in the 2019-20 season, as they won all ten games, earning them promotion to tier 5, despite the season being curtailed due to the COVID-19 pandemic.

Following the amalgamation of Lincoln United FC and Hykeham Town FC ahead of the 2020-21 season, Lincoln United Women was established, coinciding with their first season competing in the East Midlands Women's Regional Football League Premier Division, playing their matches at Ashby Avenue, the home of Lincoln United Football Club. The 2020-21 season, however, was ultimately cut short from May due to the COVID-19 pandemic.

In the 2021-22 season, the team secured third place in the East Midlands Women's Regional League Premier Division, trailing behind Northampton Town Women and Chesterfield FC Women. They also reached the EMWRL Cup final for the first time, losing out 4-3 to eventual winners Derby County Women Academy. Additionally, their journey to the Second Round of the 2021-22 Women's FA Cup stands as their best performance in the competition to date, concluding with a 4-1 defeat away to third-tier side West Bromwich Albion Women

During the 2022-23 season, the team won the Lincolnshire FA County Women's Cup for the first time, defeating city rivals Lincoln City Women 2-0 in the final at Jakemans Community Stadium, with goals from Sally Cairns and Demi Barai. The 2022-23 season also saw the team secure a cup double by capturing the EMWRL Cup, triumphing over Arnold Eagles FC Women in the final, with goals from Tracey Duxbury-Mead and Ellie Gilliatt. The season was not without controversy however, as the team was removed from the FA cup after fielding an ineligible player.

Their success continued into the 2023-24 season, where they secured a historic treble. The team won all 18 of their league games, earning promotion to tier 4 of the FA Women's National League (Division One Midlands) for the first time in their history. They also triumphed in the League Cup winning a 5-0 victory over Basford United FC Ladies and claimed the Lincolnshire FA County Women's Cup with a dominant 9-0 win against Stamford AFC Young Daniels Women. Over the course of the season, the team won 28 of their 29 matches, with their sole defeat against fourth-tier side Loughborough Lightning in the First Round of the Women's FA Cup, and set a club record with 185 goals.

In June 2024, Ricky Pledger succeeded Chris Funnell as manager.

Ricky Pledger was then removed from his duties as first team manager in September 2024 and was briefly replaced by Chris Funnell before Lee Mitchell was appointed in October 2024 .

After retaining tier 4 status, Lee Mitchell departed before the start of the 2025/26 season and was replaced by Alex Brito Noguiera ahead of the new season. With only 1 league point Noguiera parted ways with the club in February 2026. With relegation confirmed, Tom Padden was appointed from local rivals Gainsborough Trinity and the club shared a 2-2 draw away to Sutton Coldfield in his first game in charge.

Although relegation had been confirmed prior to Padden’s appointment the club finished the season with silverware, beating Spalding United 6-0 in the Lincolnshire County Women’s Cup Final at Boston United’s Jakemans Community Stadium

== Players ==
=== Current squad ===
As of 29 August 2024

Note: Flags indicate national team as defined under FIFA eligibility rules; some limited exceptions apply. Players may hold more than one non-FIFA nationality.

No.	Pos.	Nation	Player
1	GK	ENG	Amy Hood
2	DF	ENG	Sally Cairns
3	DF	ENG	Sarah Newton
4	MF	ENG	Katie Williams
5	DF	ENG	Chloe Brock-Taylor
6	MF	ENG	Stacey McConville
7	MF	ENG	Lauren Churcher (captain)
8	FW	ENG	Taylor Dean
9	MF	ENG	Jodie Steadman
10	MF	ENG	Izzy Thorpe
11	FW	ENG	Betsy Thomas

No.	Pos.	Nation	Player
12	FW	ENG	Bella Bogg
13	GK	ENG	Rosie Davidson (club captain)
15	FW	ENG	Kaitlin Peaker
16	FW	ENG	Holly Wilson
17	DF	ENG	Demi Barai
18	FW	ENG	Amy Copley
19	DF	ENG	Olivia Smith (vice-captain)
20	MF	ENG	Abi Ringrose
21	FW	ENG	Alice Hayes
26	DF	ENG	Lou Hembrough

== Staff ==
Position	Incumbent
Manager	Tom Padden
Assistant Manager	
Goalkeeper Coach	Liam Powell
Physio	Tom Philips
Kitman	Jack Johnson

== Honours ==
- East Midlands Womens Regional Football League Premier Division
  - Winners (1): 2023-24
- East Midlands Womens Regional Football League Div 1 North
  - Winners (1): 2019-20
- East Midlands Womens Regional Football League Cup
  - Winners (2): 2022-23; 2023-24
- Lincolnshire FA County Women's Cup:
  - Winners (2): 2022-23; 2023-24

== Team Records ==
- Highest league position: 1st, East Midlands Womens Regional Football League Premier Division (2023-24)
- Best Women's FA Cup performance: Second round 2021-22

=== Matches ===
- Record league victory: 22-0 vs Retford United Ladies (10 March 2019)
- Record FA Cup victory: 5-0 vs Oadby & Wigston; 6-1 vs Millmoor Juniors (both October 2021)

=== Streaks ===
==== Unbeaten ====
- Longest unbeaten league run: 24, 19 March 2023 - 28 April 2024
- Longest unbeaten home run (league): 18, 25 Sept 2022 to present
- Longest unbeaten away run (league): 11, 9 April 2023 to 28 April 2024

==== Wins ====
- Longest winning streak (league): 23, 26 March 2023 to 28 April 2024.
- Longest winning streak (all competitions): 21, 6 December 2023 to 26 May 2024

==== Clean sheets ====
- Most consecutive clean sheets (league): 4, 8 October 2023 to 14 Jan 2024

=== Most ===
==== Wins ====
- Most wins in a league season: 18, 2023-24
- Most wins in a season (all competitions): 28, 2023-24

==== Goals ====
- Most goals scored in a league season: 110, 2023-24
- Most goals scored in a single season (all competitions): 185, 2023-24

=== Fewest ===
==== Goals ====
- Fewest goals conceded in a league season: 10, 2023-24

== Player Records ==
- Last goal as Hykeham Town Ladies FC: Tracey Duxbury-Mead vs Notts County Women Development, 8 March 2020
- First goal as Lincoln United Women: Chloe Brock-Taylor vs Chesterfield FC Women, 19 September 2021

=== Goals ===
- Most goals scored in one league match: 8, Ellie Gilliatt vs Anstey Nomads, 17 December 2023.
- Most hat-tricks scored in a league season: 9, Ellie Gilliatt (2023-24)

== See also ==
- List of women's association football clubs in England and Wales
- Women's football in England
- List of women's association football clubs
