= Cheltenham Town W.F.C. =

English football club

Coordinates: 51.71175°N 1.944542°W

Cheltenham Town W.F.C
- Full name: Cheltenham Town Women Football Club
- Nickname: The Robinesses
- Founded: 1989; 37 years ago
- Ground: Kayte Lane Stadium, Bishop's Cleeve
- Chairman: Andy Liddle
- Manager: Tom Davies
- League: FA Women's National League South
- 2025–26: FA Women's National League South, 8th of 12
- Website: ctwomenfc.com

Cheltenham Town Women Football Club is an English women's association football club based in Cheltenham, Gloucestershire, although the team play the majority of their games in nearby Bishop's Cleeve. The team competes in the FA Women's National League South, the third tier of the English Women's Football Pyramid.

The team, having started life as a 5-a-side team, were admitted as founding members to the South-West Combination Women's Football League for the 1998/99 season, before being relegated down to the South-West Women's Football League after the 2001/02 season. After 12 Seasons in the South West League, the Robinesses were promoted to the newly created FA Women's National League Division One South West after a Runners-Up finish in the 2013/14 season.

In the 2021/22 season, after several years of growth, Cheltenham won the Division One South West Crown, and were promoted to the Women's National League Southern Premier.

The club currently play at Kayte Lane in Bishop's Cleeve, having taken up residency at the stadium before the 2023/24 season. Previously, the club had had spells at the Corinum Stadium in Cirencester, as well as at Petersfield Park (home of Cheltenham Saracens) and Newlands Park (Home of Cheltenham Tigers RFC)

== History ==
The club was formed in 1989 as 'Cheltenham YMCA', originally a 5-a-side team before making the step-up to full 11-a-side. The club were admitted to the league system for the 1998/99 season, when they joined the newly-formed South-West Combination Women's Football League. Their debut season saw an appearance in the South-West Combination League Cup Final, which was lost to Swindon Town. This was followed up by another League Cup final appearance in the 2000/01 season, once again being defeated by Swindon.

In the 2001/02 season, the club were relegated to the South West Women's Football League. They came runner-up in 2007/08, before a 2008/09 season which saw a run to the 3rd Round of the Women's FA Cup and another final, this time the Gloucestershire FA County Women's Trophy.

In the 2013/14 season, the Robinesses once again finished second in the South-West League, but, with the advent of the new National League Division Ones, they were promoted to the National League Division One South West, finishing 8th in the first season of play, whilst once again being runners up in the County Women's Trophy.

There was finally a trophy breakthrough in the 2016/17 season, as Cheltenham won the GFA County Women's Trophy in a 5-4 penalty shootout against St Nicholas Ladies Football Club. Another final loss in the Trophy occurred the next season, before a 10–0 victory over Frampton Rangers saw then lift the 2018/19 Trophy. The 18/19 season also saw strides made in the league, with a club-best 4th place in the league This was also the season in which they were nominated for FA WNL Club of the year.

After 2 seasons of highly affected football due to the COVID-19 pandemic, Cheltenham won their first ever league title, lifting the Division One South West. The team also reached the semi-finals of the National League Plate and won their 3rd GFA Women's County Trophy, defeating Almondsbury Ladies 3–0. Manager Tom Davies also scooped The FA Women's National League Division One West Manager of the Year after previously winning December's Tier 4 Manager of the Month.

The 2022/23 season saw an 8th-place finish in the Women's National League Southern Premier, before a 7th-place finish in 2023/24 and 8th in 2024/25. 24/25 also saw the club reach the 4th round of the FA Cup for the first time, and a berth in the National League Plate, where they lost 3–2 to Bournemouth

== Players ==
As of 17 August 2026

Note: Flags indicate national team as defined under FIFA eligibility rules; some limited exceptions apply. Players may hold more than one non-FIFA nationality.

| No. | Pos. | Nation | Player |
|---|---|---|---|
| 1 | GK | ENG | Lily Felgate (on ADR from Birmingham City) |
| 2 | DF | WAL | Shurima Vine |
| 3 | DF | ENG | Charlotte Salisbury-Williams |
| 4 | DF | ENG | Holly Finch |
| 5 | DF | ENG | Courtney Jones |
| 6 | MF | ENG | Casi Evans |
| 7 | MF | ENG | Amelie Curtis |
| 8 | MF | WAL | Ruby Day |
| 9 | FW | ENG | Leo Joyce |
| 10 | MF | ENG | Libby Bell |
| 11 | MF | ENG | Indie Power |

| No. | Pos. | Nation | Player |
|---|---|---|---|
| 13 | FW | ENG | Grace Nascimento |
| 14 | DF | ENG | Lilly Wellesley-Davies |
| 15 | DF | ENG | Emily Owen |
| 16 | MF | ENG | Alex Hall |
| 18 | FW | ENG | Chloe Snook |
| 20 | GK | ENG | Chloe Jones |
| 21 | DF | ENG | Evie Murphy |
| 22 | MF | WAL | Kiera O'Keefe |
| 23 | FW | ENG | Georgia Galley |
| - | DF | ENG | Kaitlyn Hicks-Kenward (on ADR from Birmingham City) |

== Club management ==
As of 17 August 2026

| Manager | Tom Davies |
| Assistant Manager | Mike Harris |
| First Team Coach | Sebastian Bacon |
| Goalkeeping Coach | James Dobson |
| Head of Medical | Fraser Linnitt |
| Head of Medical | Chloe Bakewell-Barratt |

== Honours ==
League

- FA Women's National League Division One South West
  - Champions: 2021-22

Cup

- Gloucestershire County Women's Trophy
  - Winners: 2016–17, 2018–19, 2021–22
