= Worthing F.C. Women =

Association football club in England

Worthing
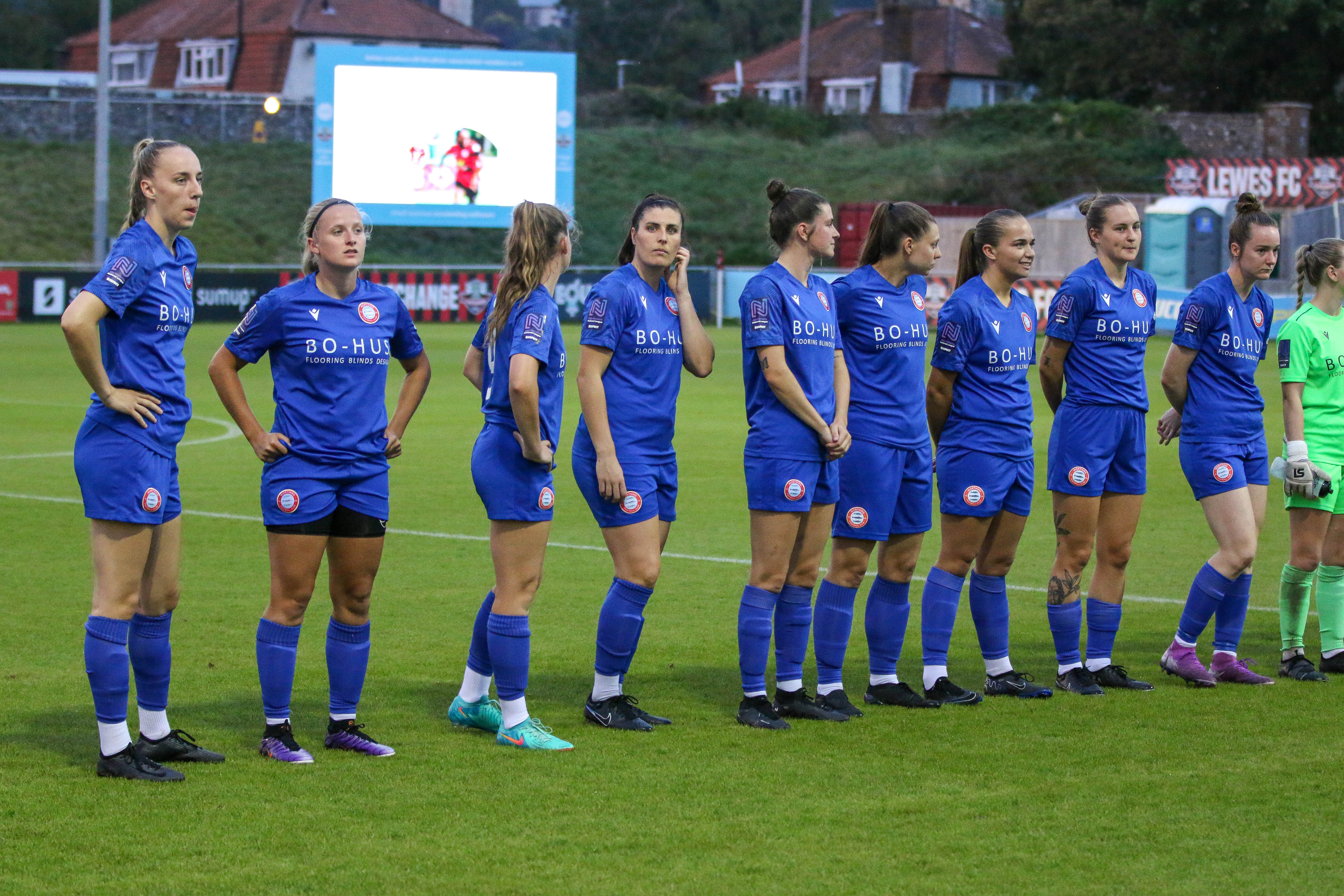
- in 2024
- Full name: Worthing Football Club
- Nicknames: The Rebels, The Reds
- Ground: Woodside Road, Worthing
- Capacity: 4,000
- Owner: George Dowell
- Chairman: Barry Hunter
- Manager: Jesus Cordon
- League: FA Women's National League Division One South West
- 2024–25: FA Women's National League Division One South East, 5th of 12
Home colours	Away colours

Worthing Football Club are an English association football club based in Worthing, West Sussex, fielding men's and women's teams. The women's team currently play in The FA Women's National League Division One South West, having been moved laterally from The FA Women's National League Division one South East in the previous season. This followed Worthing having won Division One South of the London and South East Women's Regional Football League in 2021-22 having led in 2019—20 and 2020—21 until both seasons were curtailed due to the COVID-19 pandemic. The club plays at Woodside Road.

Former Brighton & Hove Albion Women and Lewes F.C. Women manager John Donoghue was appointed manager in 2021 and in 2024 the manager was Jesus Corden.

== Managerial history ==
Dates	Name
2019—2021	(England) Michelle Lawrence
2021—2024	(England) John Donoghue
2024—	(Spain) Jesus Cordon

== Current squad ==
Last Updated 18 October 2025

Note: Flags indicate national team as defined under FIFA eligibility rules; some limited exceptions apply. Players may hold more than one non-FIFA nationality.

No.	Pos.	Nation	Player
1	GK		Ella Hunkin
2	DF		Eleanor Keegan
3	DF		Tilly Jones
4	DF		Holly Talbut-Smith
5	DF		Grace Jarrett
6	DF		Mia South
7	FW		Skye Bacon
8	MF		Sophia Wickenden
9	FW		Jasmine Smith
10	MF		Leila Malcolm
11	MF		Hailey Bridge

No.	Pos.	Nation	Player
12	MF		Taylor Chamberlain
14	MF		Meghan Gates
15	FW		Lauren Amerena
16	MF		Oceana Adams
17	DF		Keira Morris
18	DF		Jess Faires
19	FW		Amber Hazelwood
20	DF		Gabriella Ford
—	MF		Izzy Chapman
—	MF		Ella Newman
—	MF		Erin Sherwood

== See also ==
- Sport in Worthing
- Football in Sussex
