= Horsfall Stadium =

Sports stadium in Bradford, West Yorkshire, England

Coordinates: 53°45′31.88″N 1°46′34.33″W

Horsfall Community Stadium
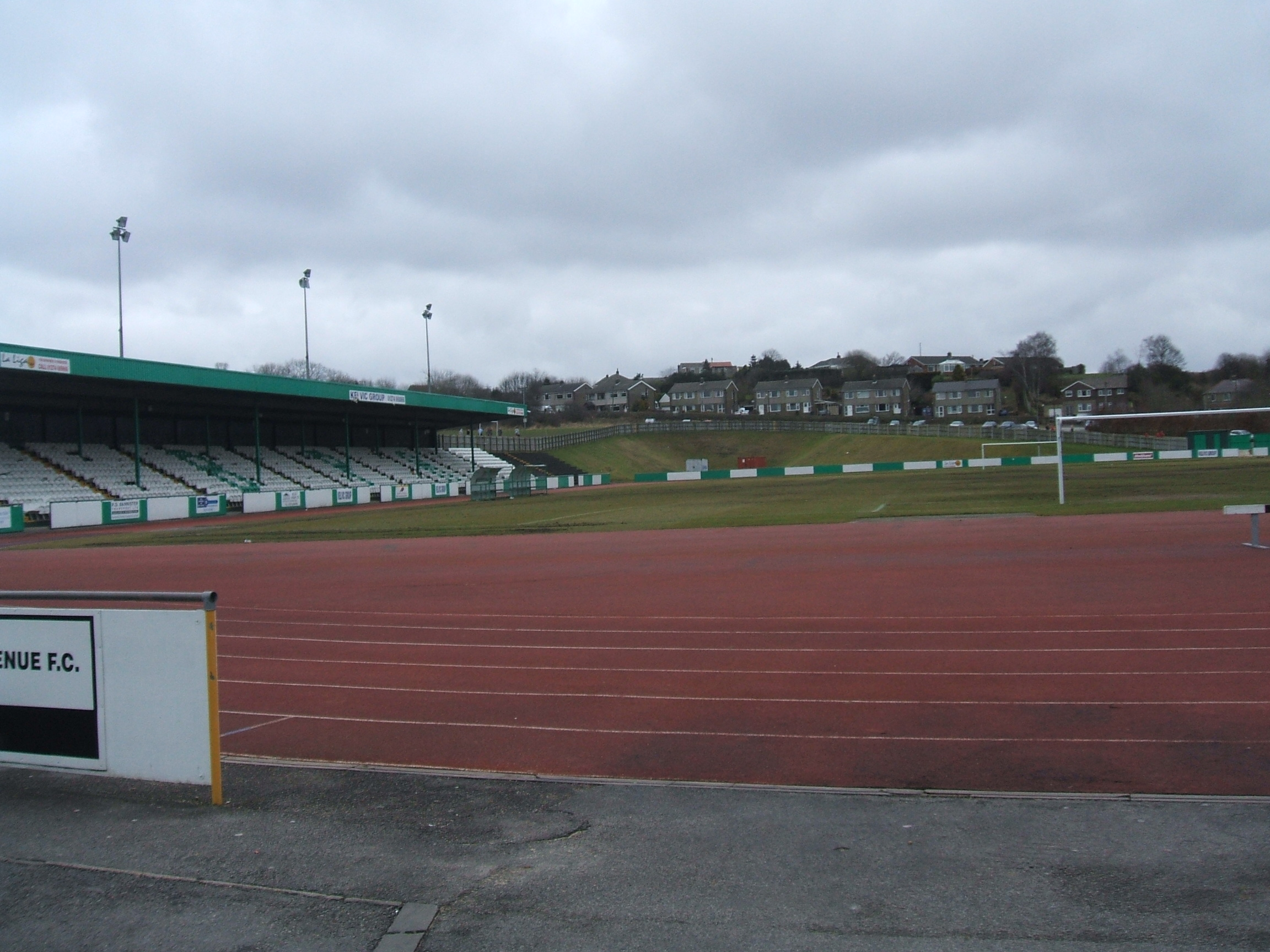
- Interactive map of Horsfall Community Stadium
- Location: Bradford, England
- Owner: Bradford Council
- Capacity: 3,500
- Surface: Artificial Grass

Construction
- Opened: 1931

Tenants
- Athletics; Bradford Airedale AC (1931–present); Football; Bradford (Park Avenue) (1996–present); Albion Sports (2023–present); Rugby League; West Bowling (2021–present); Bradford Bulls Academy (2021–present)

Horsfall Community Stadium is a sports stadium just off Halifax Road in Bradford, West Yorkshire, England, 2.5 miles (4.0 km) south-west of the city centre. It was built in 1931 as home for Airedale Harriers (now Bradford Airedale A.C.) and is now also home for Bradford (Park Avenue) A.F.C., Albion Sports A.F.C. and West Bowling ARLFC

The track was upgraded to a synthetic surface in 1994 and the stadium further upgraded for football in 1996 when Bradford (Park Avenue) moved to the stadium.

== History ==
Horsfall was officially opened on 5 September 1931 by Alderman S Horsfall JP who was chairman of the parks and cemeteries committee. It was originally opened as a track and field facility and a base for Airedale Harriers A.C. (founded in 1880, later to become Airedale and Spen Valley A.C. or ASVAC, and then Bradford Airedale A.C.). The infield was also then used for hockey.

The track was substantially upgraded and modified in 1994 (from one having a 200-yard extended straight and tight bends) to a standard layout and from cinder to an artificial surface.

The stadium was further amended in 1996 when homeless Bradford (Park Avenue) moved in and the ground was brought up to standard for football to be played.

Changes were made in 2007 to ensure Horsfall met the stringent ground grading requirements of the Football Association. A new directors room was built as well as a players lounge, medical facilities and toilets. The main stand was also refurbished with 1,800 new seats coming from Lord's Cricket Ground.

In 2020, Bradford (Park Avenue) took out a 35-year lease to manage the stadium which was then passed onto Horsfall Community Stadium to ensure the stadium remained a resource for the whole community. This led to the installation of a 3G pitch which paved the way for rugby league side West Bowling and Bradford Bulls’ Academy to use the stadium.

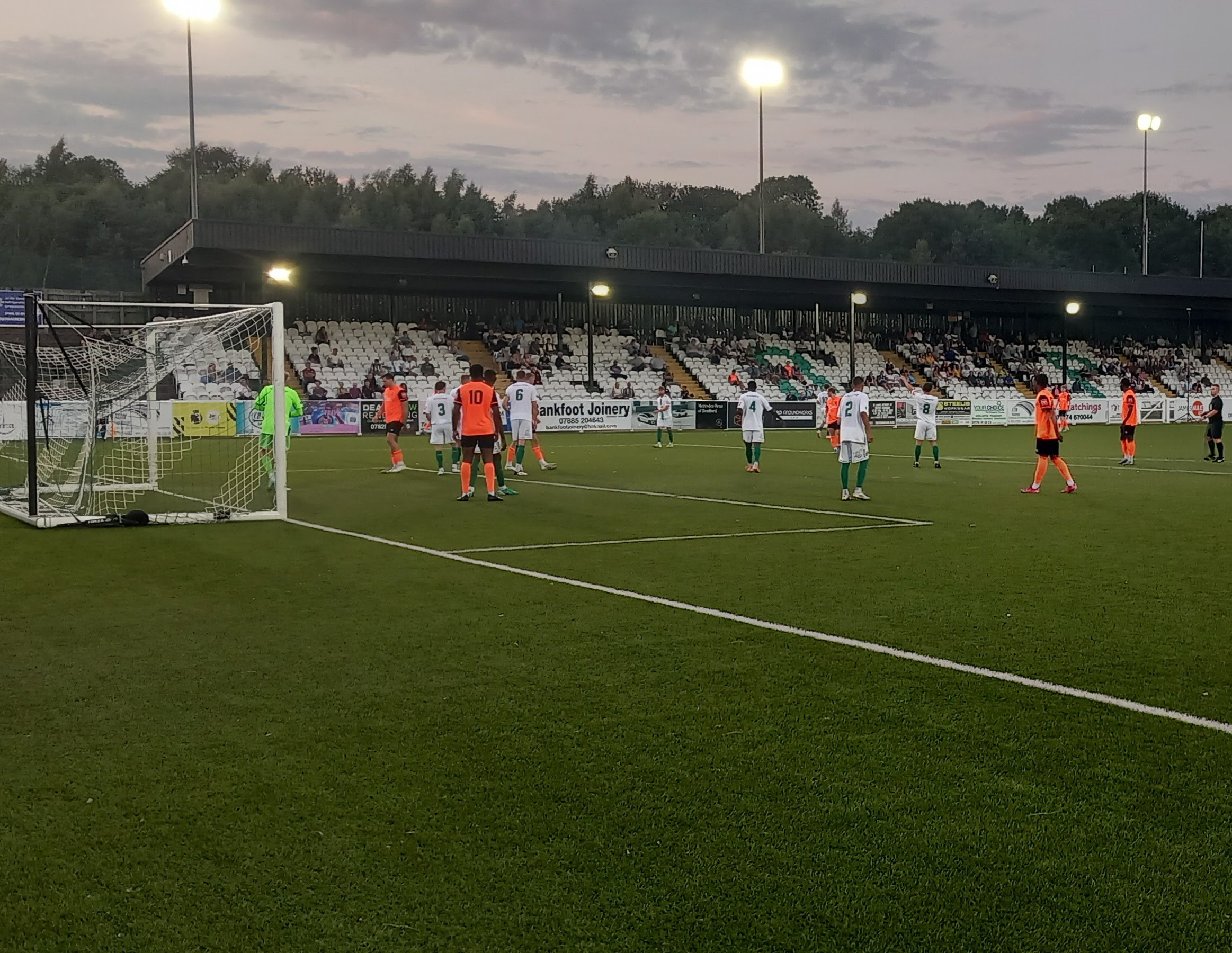
Bradford Park Avenue v Emley 2025

== Facilities ==
=== Stands ===
Horsfall has one main stand located at the north end of the ground running parallel with the pitch and running track. The middle of the stand contains covered seating with both ends being uncovered terracing. Despite the ends of the stand being terraced, the supporters are not allowed to stand but must sit on the concrete.

As well as the main stand, there are two other areas for spectators. One is a small metal stand of terracing known as the Bus Shelter at the Cemetery End towards the West of the ground within the running track and behind the goalmouth. The other is a small stand of 29 seats at the South End of the ground. Bizarrely, supporters are not allowed to use the small South seats as they are just to comply with ground regulations.

There are two entrances at Horsfall. The main being on Cemetery Road on the West side of the ground, the other at the opposite on the East side that is accessible from Park Road.

=== Pavilion ===
The Pavilion located at the South side of the ground houses four changing rooms, two on ground level and two in the basement. There is a room upstairs overlooking the pitch which is used by the PA announcer and the press as well as a gantry for filming matches.

=== Clubhouse ===
The main entrance of the ground is on Cemetery Road on the West side and is where the clubhouse is located in the North West corner which contains a bar and directors box. Opposite in the South West corner is a banqueting suit.

=== Track and field ===
The infield is a 3G pitch and has a fence surrounding it. Around the pitch is a six-lane running track of porous synthetic material. At the East end of the pitch is a long and triple jump runway and sand pit and to the West is an area for high jump.

== Usage ==
=== Athletics ===
Airedale Harriers and its successor clubs, ASVAC and Bradford Airedale AC, have used the athletics facilities continuously since Horsfall's opening. After the track's refurbishment in 1994 other local clubs have used it. The facility is no longer suitable for hosting competitions, but is used by several athletics and running clubs for training purposes.

=== Football ===
Bradford (Park Avenue) brought football to the Horsfall in 1996. It was the first time for a long time that any sport other than athletics had been played at the stadium.

In the mid-2000s Bradford Council, who own Horsfall, announced plans for a new multi sports facility to replace Odsal Stadium which included Bradford (Park Avenue) and Bradford Bulls sharing a new stadium.

By 2008 Avenue announced ambitious plans to build a 20,000 seater stadium at Phoenix Park in Thornbury, with the club aiming to regain their League status. These plans were criticised by Bradford Council however neither new stadium at Odsal or Thornbury were built.

In 2018 it was announced the Avenue were in talks to move to Odsal Stadium but would still host reserve fixtures at Horsfall. However nothing ever came of this and Avenue remained at Horsfall.

=== Rugby League ===
After the laying of a new 3G pitch in 2020, National Conference League side West Bowling relocated from Raymond Street playing fields off Manchester Road.

As well as West Bowling playing at Horsfall, Bradford Bulls moved all their academy teams there after they temporarily left Odsal in 2020.
