= 2026–27 FA Women's National League =

FA Women's National League
- Season: 2026–27
- Dates: 15 August 2026 – 2 May 2027

The 2026–27 FA Women's National League is the 36th season of the FA Women's National League, and the eighth since a restructure and rebranding of the top four tiers of English football. It sits at the third and fourth levels of the women's football pyramid, below the Women's Super League 2 and above the eight regional football leagues.

The league features six regional divisions: the Northern and Southern Premier divisions at level three of the pyramid, and Division One North, Midlands, South East, and South West at the fourth level. The league consists of 72 teams, divided into six divisions of 12 each.

== Premier Division ==
=== Northern Premier Division ===
FA Women's National League Northern Premier Division
- Season: 2026–27
- Matches: 45
- Goals: 163 (3.62 per match)
- All statistics correct as of 28 October 2026.

Location of Northern Premier Division clubs for the 2026–27 season

Changes from last season:

- Burnley were promoted to the WSL 2 as WNL North champions.
- Wolverhampton Wanderers were promoted to the WSL 2 as play-off winners.
- Huddersfield Town were promoted from Division One North as champions.
- Peterborough United were promoted from Division One Midlands as champions.
- Boldmere St. Michaels were promoted as Division One play-off winners.
- Norwich City were promoted as Division One play-off winners.

Club	Home ground	Position 2025–26
Boldmere St. Michaels	The Amber Arena and Community Stadium, Sutton Coldfield	Division One Midlands, 2nd
Derby County	Don Amott Arena, Derby	8th
Huddersfield Town	The Stafflex Arena, Kirkburton	Division One; North, 1st
Hull City	Easy Buy Stadium, Barton-upon-Humber	9th
Liverpool Feds	Jericho Lane, Liverpool	7th
Loughborough Lightning	Loughborough University Stadium, Loughborough	10th
Middlesbrough	Bishopton Road West, Stockton	5th
Norwich City	The Nest, Horsford	Division One; South East, 2nd
Peterborough United	PIMS Park, Peterborough	Division One Midlands, 1st
Rugby Borough	Kilsby Lane, Rugby	3rd
Stoke City	Wellbeing Park, Yarnfield	4th
West Bromwich Albion	Valley Stadium, Redditch	6th

==== League table ====
Pos	Team	Pld	W	D	L	GF	GA	GD	Pts	Qualification
1	Rugby Borough	10	8	1	1	23	3	+20	25	Promotion to WSL 2
2	West Bromwich Albion	9	7	0	2	19	8	+11	21	
3	Huddersfield Town	9	5	3	1	22	13	+9	18	
4	Stoke City	9	5	2	2	17	8	+9	17	
5	Liverpool Feds	10	5	1	4	22	18	+4	16	
6	Peterborough United	9	4	1	4	12	19	−7	13	
7	Derby County	10	4	0	6	12	17	−5	12	
8	Norwich City	10	2	5	3	14	16	−2	11	
9	Loughborough Lightning	10	3	2	5	13	20	−7	11	
10	Middlesbrough	9	2	1	6	4	10	−6	7	
11	Boldmere St. Michaels	9	1	3	5	12	25	−13	6	Relegation to FA WNL Division One
12	Hull City	10	1	1	8	8	21	−13	4	Relegation to FA WNL Division One

Updated to match(es) played on 8 November 2026. Source: FA Women's National League
Rules for classification: 1) Points; 2) Goal difference; 3) Number of goals scored

==== Results ====
Home \ Away	BLD	DER	HUD	HUL	LIV	LOU	MID	NOR	PTB	RUG	STK	WBA
Boldmere St. Michaels	—	2–3	2–4			1–1	1–0					
Derby County		—		2–1			1–0			0–1	0–1	0–3
Huddersfield Town		2–1	—	2–1		5–1	3–1					
Hull City	1–1			—	1–4			0–2	0–1	1–3		
Liverpool Feds		5–1	1–1		—		1–0				0–3	2–3
Loughborough Lightning		2–1		2–3	0–2	—		2–3			1–0	
Middlesbrough				1–0			—	1–1	0–1	0–2		1–0
Norwich City	2–2		1–1		3–5			—			1–1	0–2
Peterborough United		0–3	3–2		3–2	2–3		1–1	—			
Rugby Borough	5–1				3–0	0–0		1–0	5–0	—		
Stoke City	5–1		2–2	3–0						0–3	—	2–0
West Bromwich Albion	4–1					3–1			3–1	1–0		—

Updated to match(es) played on 8 November 2026. Source: FA Women's National League
Legend: Blue = home team win; Yellow = draw; Red = away team win.

=== Southern Premier Division ===
FA Women's National League Southern Premier Division
- Season: 2026–27
- Matches: 52
- Goals: 181 (3.48 per match)
- All statistics correct as of 29 October 2026.

Location of Southern Premier Division clubs for the 2026–27 season

Changes from last season:

- Watford were promoted to the WSL 2 as WNL South champions.
- Fulham were promoted from Division One South East as champions.
- Swindon Town were promoted from Division One South West as champions.
- Portsmouth were relegated from the WSL 2.

Club	Home ground	Position 2025–26
AFC Bournemouth	Long Lane, Ringwood	3rd
AFC Wimbledon	Imperial Fields, Morden	10th
Cheltenham Town	Kayte Lane, Bishop's Cleeve	8th
Exeter City	St James Park, Exeter	7th
Fulham	Motspur Park, New Malden	Division One South East, 1st
Hashtag United	Parkside, Aveley	9th
Lewes	The Dripping Pan, Lewes	5th
Oxford United	Marsh Lane, Marston	4th
Plymouth Argyle	Home Park, Plymouth	2nd
Portsmouth	Fratton Park, Portsmouth	WSL 2, 12th
Real Bedford	McMullen Park, Bedford	6th
Swindon Town	County Ground, Swindon	Division One South West, 1st

==== League table ====
Pos	Team	Pld	W	D	L	GF	GA	GD	Pts	Qualification
1	Oxford United	10	8	2	0	30	5	+25	26	Promotion to WSL 2
2	Fulham	9	8	0	1	23	5	+18	24	
3	Portsmouth	9	5	3	1	19	6	+13	18	
4	AFC Bournemouth	9	5	1	3	15	7	+8	16	
5	Exeter City	10	4	2	4	18	20	−2	14	
6	Lewes	10	3	4	3	13	12	+1	13	
7	AFC Wimbledon	8	3	3	2	13	4	+9	12	
8	Real Bedford	9	3	1	5	14	20	−6	10	
9	Hashtag United	10	1	5	4	9	19	−10	8	
10	Cheltenham Town	10	2	2	6	20	31	−11	8	
11	Swindon Town	10	2	1	7	12	22	−10	7	Relegation to FA WNL Division One
12	Plymouth Argyle	10	1	0	9	6	41	−35	3	Relegation to FA WNL Division One

Updated to match(es) played on 8 November 2026. Source: FA Women's National League
Rules for classification: 1) Points; 2) Goal difference; 3) Number of goals scored

==== Results ====
Home \ Away	AFB	WIM	CHL	EXE	FUL	HSH	LEW	OXF	PLY	POR	BED	SWI
AFC Bournemouth	—		2–1		1–2	4–1		0–1		0–1		
AFC Wimbledon	0–1	—					0–0	1–2			2–0	
Cheltenham Town			—	4–4		2–2			4–1		1–3	5–1
Exeter City	0–1	1–4		—			3–1	0–4	5–1			
Fulham			4–0	1–2	—	3–0			5–0	1–0		
Hashtag United		0–0		1–1		—		0–5		0–0		4–2
Lewes	1–1		3–0		0–1	1–1	—				5–2	
Oxford United			5–0				3–0	—	5–0		2–2	1–0
Plymouth Argyle	0–5	0–6				1–0			—	0–4	1–3	
Portsmouth			6–3				0–0	2–2		—		4–0
Real Bedford				1–2	1–4					0–2	—	2–1
Swindon Town		0–0		2–0	1–2		1–2		4–2			—

Updated to match(es) played on 8 November 2026. Source: FA Women's National League
Legend: Blue = home team win; Yellow = draw; Red = away team win.

== Division One ==
=== Division One North ===
FA Women's National League Division One North
- Season: 2026–27
- Matches: 47
- Goals: 201 (4.28 per match)
- All statistics correct as of 29 October 2026.

Location of Division One North clubs for the 2026–27 season

Changes from last season:

- Huddersfield Town were promoted to the Northern Premier Division as champions.
- Halifax were relegated from the Northern Premier Division.
- AFC Fylde were promoted from the North West Women's Regional Football League as champions.
- Bradford City were promoted from the North East Regional Women's Football League as champions.
- Thornaby were promoted as the highest-ranked second-place team in Tier 5.
- Doncaster Rovers Belles were relegated to the East Midlands Regional Women's Football League.
- Blackburn Rovers were reprieved from relegation after Cheadle Town Stingers' first team was disbanded.
- Wythenshawe moved laterally to Division One Midlands.

Club	Home ground	Position 2025–26
AFC Fylde	Kellamergh Park, Warton	NWWRFL, 1st
Blackburn Rovers	Shawbridge, Clitheroe	12th
Bradford City	Horsfall Stadium, Bradford	NERWFL, 1st
Chester-le-Street Town L.F.C.	Moor Park House, Chester-le-Street	9th
Chorley Women F.C.	Jim Fowlers Memorial Ground, Euxton	8th
Durham Cestria	The Graham Sports Centre, Durham	5th
Halifax	Myra Shay, Bradford	Northern Premier Division, 11th
Leeds United	BD Community Stadium, Garforth	3rd
Norton & Stockton Ancients L.F.C.	Station Road, Norton, County Durham	6th
Stockport County	Stockport Sports Village, Stockport	7th
Thornaby	Teesdale Park, Stockton-on-Tees	NERWFL, 2nd
York City	University of York Sports Centre, York	10th

==== League table ====
Pos	Team	Pld	W	D	L	GF	GA	GD	Pts	Qualification
1	Leeds United	9	8	1	0	29	5	+24	25	Promotion to Premier Division
2	AFC Fylde	9	6	3	0	21	7	+14	21	Promotion play-off
3	Stockport County	9	6	1	2	31	16	+15	19	
4	Halifax	7	6	0	1	24	11	+13	18	
5	Norton & Stockton Ancients L.F.C.	9	3	2	4	15	15	0	11	
6	York City	9	3	1	5	17	19	−2	10	
7	Durham Cestria	9	3	1	5	14	19	−5	10	
8	Thornaby	9	3	0	6	15	34	−19	9	
9	Blackburn Rovers	9	2	2	5	15	21	−6	8	
10	Chester-le-Street Town L.F.C.	8	2	2	4	13	22	−9	8	
11	Bradford City	8	2	0	6	14	24	−10	6	Relegation to regional leagues
12	Chorley Women F.C.	9	1	1	7	11	26	−15	4	Relegation to regional leagues

Updated to match(es) played on 8 November 2026. Source: FA Women's National League
Rules for classification: 1) Points; 2) Goal difference; 3) Number of goals scored

==== Results ====
Home \ Away	FYL	BLA	BRA	CLS	CHO	DUR	HFX	LEE	NOR	STO	THN	YOR
AFC Fylde	—		2–1	5–2		5–0	3–1	0–0				
Blackburn Rovers	0–2	—	0–4	3–3							5–1	2–2
Bradford City			—					0–2		1–5	4–6	
Chester-le-Street Town L.F.C.			5–1	—	2–1	0–0		0–3				
Chorley Women F.C.	1–1		2–3		—	2–5		0–5				
Durham Cestria		3–4	2–0			—	2–3	0–2				2–1
Halifax		1–0					—		4–2		6–0	4–1
Leeds United								—	2–0	4–2	7–0	4–3
Norton & Stockton Ancients L.F.C.	1–1	3–0			1–2	2–0			—	3–3		
Stockport County		2–1		6–0	3–2		3–5			—		
Thornaby				3–1	3–0				2–3	0–3	—	
York City	1–2				3–1				1–0	0–4	5–0	—

Updated to match(es) played on 8 November 2026. Source: FA Women's National League
Legend: Blue = home team win; Yellow = draw; Red = away team win.

=== Division One Midlands ===
FA Women's National League Division One Midlands
- Season: 2026–27
- Matches: 48
- Goals: 176 (3.67 per match)
- All statistics correct as of 29 October 2026.

Location of Division One Midlands clubs for the 2026–27 season

Changes from last season:

- Peterborough United were promoted to the Northern Premier Division as champions.
- Sporting Khalsa were relegated from the Northern Premier Division.
- Lincoln United/Lincoln Women were relegated to the East Midlands Regional Women's Football League.
- Stourbridge were relegated to the West Midlands Regional Women's Football League.
- Chesterfield were promoted from the East Midlands Regional Women's Football League as champions.
- Lye Town Women were promoted from the West Midlands Regional Women's Football League.
- Wythenshawe moved laterally from Division One North.

Club	Home ground	Position 2025–26
Barnsley Women's	Sheffield Olympic Legacy Park, Sheffield	4th (42 pts)
Chesterfield	Debdale Sports Park, Mansfield Woodhouse	Division One Midlands, 1st
Kidderminster Harriers L.F.C.	King George V Playing Fields, Droitwich	9th
Leafield Athletic	Castle Vale Stadium, Birmingham	3rd
Lye Town Women	Stourbridge Road, Stourbridge	Division One Midlands, 1st
Northampton Town Women F.C.	O'Riordan Bond Stadium, Moulton	7th
Notts County	Coronation Park, Eastwood	8th
Sheffield F.C.	Home of Football Stadium, Dronfield	6th
Sporting Khalsa	PIMS Park, Peterborough	Northern Premier Division, 12th
Sutton Coldfield Town F.C. Women	Central Ground, Sutton Coldfield	10th
Worcester City W.F.C.	Sixways Stadium, Worcester	5th
Wythenshawe F.C. Women	Hollyhedge Park Community Stadium, Sharston	Division One North, 4th (43 pts)

==== League table ====
Pos	Team	Pld	W	D	L	GF	GA	GD	Pts	Qualification
1	Barnsley Women's	9	7	0	2	23	10	+13	21	Promotion to Premier Division
2	Notts County	9	7	0	2	21	15	+6	21	Promotion play-off
3	Leafield Athletic	9	6	1	2	21	13	+8	19	
4	Sporting Khalsa	8	5	1	2	21	11	+10	16	
5	Chesterfield	8	5	0	3	10	4	+6	15	
6	Worcester City W.F.C.	9	4	1	4	24	18	+6	13	
7	Wythenshawe F.C. Women	8	3	1	4	21	14	+7	10	
8	Lye Town Women	8	3	1	4	17	15	+2	10	
9	Northampton Town Women F.C.	9	3	0	6	11	16	−5	9	
10	Kidderminster Harriers L.F.C.	9	2	3	4	12	18	−6	9	
11	Sutton Coldfield Town F.C. Women	9	2	1	6	7	17	−10	7	Relegation to regional leagues
12	Sheffield F.C.	9	0	1	8	4	41	−37	1	Relegation to regional leagues

Updated to match(es) played on 8 November 2026. Source: FA Women's National League
Rules for classification: 1) Points; 2) Goal difference; 3) Number of goals scored

==== Results ====
Home \ Away	BAR	CHF	KID	LEA	LYE	NHT	NOC	SHE	SPK	SUT	WOR	WYT
Barnsley Women's	—	0–1	4–2		2–1				5–2	3–0		
Chesterfield		—	1–0		0–2					0–1		1–0
Kidderminster Harriers L.F.C.			—			4–1		1–1			2–2	2–1
Leafield Athletic	1–0	1–0	4–0	—			1–2				3–2	
Lye Town Women				2–4	—	2–0		6–0			2–5	
Northampton Town Women F.C.				2–1		—	0–1		0–1		1–2	
Notts County	0–1		3–0				—			4–3		3–2
Sheffield F.C.		0–6				1–5	2–4	—				0–4
Sporting Khalsa			1–1		3–1		3–0	8–0	—			
Sutton Coldfield Town F.C. Women				1–2	1–1	0–1		1–0	0–3	—		
Worcester City W.F.C.	1–5	0–1					3–4	6–0		3–0	—	
Wythenshawe F.C. Women	2–3			4–4		4–1			4–0			—

Updated to match(es) played on 8 November 2026. Source: FA Women's National League
Legend: Blue = home team win; Yellow = draw; Red = away team win.

=== Division One South East ===
FA Women's National League Division One South East
- Season: 2026–27
- Matches: 48
- Goals: 149 (3.1 per match)
- All statistics correct as of 29 October 2026.

Location of Division One South East clubs for the 2026–27 season

Changes from last season:

- Billericay Town F.C. Women were relegated from the Southern Premier Division.
- Fulham were promoted to the Southern Premier Division as champions.
- AFC Sudbury Women were relegated to the Eastern Region Women's Football League.
- Chesham United L.F.C. were relegated to the Southern Region Women's Football League.
- Stevenage F.C. Women were promoted from the Eastern Region Women's Football League as champions.
- Dartford F.C. Women were promoted from the London and South East Women's Regional Football League as champions.
- Saltdean United F.C. Women were promoted as the second-highest ranked (points per game) second-place team from the regional leagues.
- Norwich City were promoted (to the Northern Premier Division) as play-off winners.

Club	Home ground	Position 2025–26
Actonians	Rectory Park, Northolt	5th
Billericay Town F.C. Women	New Lodge, Billericay	Southern Premier Division, 12th
Cambridge United	Rowley Park, St Neots	10th
Chatham Town	Bauvill Stadium, Chatham	3rd
Dartford F.C. Women	Princes Park, Dartford	LSEWRFL, 1st
Dulwich Hamlet F.C. Women	Champion Hill, East Dulwich	9th
London Bees	The Hive, Edgware	4th
Luton Town	Sharpenhoe Road, Barton-le-Clay	7th
Milton Keynes Dons	Stadium MK, Milton Keynes	8th
Queens Park Rangers	Powerday Stadium, Perivale	6th
Saltdean United F.C. Women	Hill Park, Saltdean	LSEWRFL, 2nd
Stevenage F.C. Women	Herts County Ground, Letchworth	ERWFL, 1st

==== League table ====
Pos	Team	Pld	W	D	L	GF	GA	GD	Pts	Qualification
1	Actonians	9	7	2	0	28	12	+16	23	Promotion to Premier Division
2	London Bees	9	7	1	1	29	9	+20	22	Promotion play-off
3	Queens Park Rangers	9	7	1	1	21	5	+16	22	
4	Chatham Town	9	4	3	2	14	11	+3	15	
5	Stevenage F.C. Women	9	3	3	3	16	17	−1	12	
6	Saltdean United F.C. Women	9	3	2	4	14	15	−1	11	
7	Milton Keynes Dons	9	3	2	4	11	14	−3	11	
8	Cambridge United	9	3	1	5	13	17	−4	10	
9	Dulwich Hamlet F.C. Women	9	2	3	4	15	15	0	9	
10	Luton Town	9	2	3	4	7	12	−5	9	
11	Dartford F.C. Women	9	0	5	4	6	12	−6	5	Relegation to regional leagues
12	Billericay Town F.C. Women	9	0	0	9	5	40	−35	0	Relegation to regional leagues

Updated to match(es) played on 8 November 2026. Source: FA Women's National League
Rules for classification: 1) Points; 2) Goal difference; 3) Number of goals scored

==== Results ====
Home \ Away	ACT	BIL	CAM	CHA	DAR	DUL	LNB	LUT	MKD	QPR	SDU	STE
Actonians	—				1–1	2–1				3–0		3–1
Billericay Town F.C. Women	1–6	—	0–4							0–7	0–2	2–4
Cambridge United			—		1–0	3–2	0–1		0–1	1–4		
Chatham Town	3–3	3–0	3–1	—						0–3		
Dartford F.C. Women				0–0	—	1–1		1–1			0–0	
Dulwich Hamlet F.C. Women		4–1		1–2		—	0–2	1–1			2–2	
London Bees		8–1		1–0			—	5–1	3–3			5–1
Luton Town	0–1			1–2				—	0–0		2–1	
Milton Keynes Dons	2–5	2–0			2–1	1–3			—	0–1		
Queens Park Rangers					2–0		2–0	1–0		—		1–1
Saltdean United F.C. Women	3–4		4–1				1–4		1–0		—	0–2
Stevenage F.C. Women			2–2	1–1	4–2			0–1				—

Updated to match(es) played on 8 November 2026. Source: FA Women's National League
Legend: Blue = home team win; Yellow = draw; Red = away team win.

=== Division One South West ===
FA Women's National League Division One South West
- Season: 2026–27
- Matches: 47
- Goals: 173 (3.68 per match)
- All statistics correct as of 29 October 2026.

Location of Division One South West clubs for the 2026–27 season

Changes from last season:

- Gwalia United were relegated from the Southern Premier Division.
- Swindon Town were promoted to the Southern Premier Division as champions.
- Portishead Town L.F.C. were relegated to the South West Regional Women's Football League.
- Worthing were relegated to the Southern Region Women's Football League.
- Torquay United Women F.C. were promoted from the South West Regional Women's Football League as champions.
- Wycombe Wanderers Women F.C. were promoted from the Southern Region Women's Football League as champions.

Club	Home ground	Position 2025–26
Abingdon United W.F.C.	Northcourt Stadium, Abingdon	6th
Ascot United W.F.C.	The Racecourse Ground, Ascot	7th
Bournemouth Sports L.F.C.	Chapel Gate, Hurn	10th
Bridgwater United	Fairfax Park, Bridgwater	3rd
Bristol Rovers	Memorial Stadium, Bristol	4th
Gwalia United	Newport Stadium, Newport	Southern Premier Division, 11th
Keynsham Town	Crown Field, Keynsham	9th
Maidenhead United	York Road, Maidenhead	5th
Marine Academy Plymouth L.F.C.	Erme Valley, Ivybridge	8th
Moneyfields	Moneyfields Sports Ground, Portsmouth	2nd
Torquay United Women F.C.	Coach Road, Newton Abbot	SWRWFL, 1st
Wycombe Wanderers	1878 Stadium, Burnham	SRWFL, 1st

==== League table ====
Pos	Team	Pld	W	D	L	GF	GA	GD	Pts	Qualification
1	Bridgwater United	8	8	0	0	22	5	+17	24	Promotion to Premier Division
2	Moneyfields	9	7	0	2	29	10	+19	21	Promotion play-off
3	Wycombe Wanderers Women F.C.	8	6	0	2	16	7	+9	18	
4	Gwalia United	8	5	2	1	18	7	+11	17	
5	Bristol Rovers	9	5	1	3	24	14	+10	16	
6	Torquay United Women F.C.	8	4	1	3	17	9	+8	13	
7	Maidenhead United	9	4	1	4	17	19	−2	13	
8	Abingdon United W.F.C.	9	4	0	5	13	18	−5	12	
9	Keynsham Town	9	2	1	6	13	21	−8	7	
10	Bournemouth Sports	9	2	0	7	14	20	−6	6	
11	Marine Academy Plymouth L.F.C.	9	1	2	6	8	17	−9	5	Relegation to regional leagues
12	Ascot United W.F.C.	9	0	0	9	4	48	−44	0	Relegation to regional leagues

Updated to match(es) played on 8 November 2026. Source: FA Women's National League
Rules for classification: 1) Points; 2) Goal difference; 3) Number of goals scored

==== Results ====
Home \ Away	ABD	ASC	BSP	BWU	BRI	GWA	KEY	MAI	MAP	MON	TOR	WYC
Abingdon United W.F.C.	—	2–1			0–2		3–2		2–1		0–1	
Ascot United W.F.C.		—	2–4			0–6		1–5				0–6
Bournemouth Sports			—				2–1			0–1	0–3	2–3
Bridgwater United	2–0	6–0	3–2	—				1–0				
Bristol Rovers		9–0		0–3	—		2–3	0–2		3–2		
Gwalia United			1–0		2–2	—	2–2			1–2		
Keynsham Town		4–0		0–1			—				1–3	0–2
Maidenhead United	2–5		3–2			1–3		—	1–1	0–4		
Marine Academy Plymouth L.F.C.			3–2	1–2	1–3	0–1			—			0–1
Moneyfields	5–1			2–4			6–0		4–0	—	3–1	
Torquay United Women F.C.		6–0						2–3	1–1		—	
Wycombe Wanderers Women F.C.	2–0				1–3	0–2					1–0	—

Updated to match(es) played on 8 November 2026. Source: FA Women's National League
Legend: Blue = home team win; Yellow = draw; Red = away team win.

== See also ==
- 2026–27 FA Women's National League Cup
- 2026–27 FA Women's National League Plate
- 2026–27 Women's Super League (tier 1)
- 2026–27 Women's Super League 2 (tier 2)
