= 2026–27 FA Women's National League Cup =

Tournament details
- Country: England; Wales
- Date: 26 August 2026 -
- Teams: 88

Tournament statistics
- Matches played: 145
- Goals scored: 603 (4.16 per match)
- Attendance: 30,998 (214 per match)
- All statistics correct as of 8 November 2026.

The 2026–27 FA Women's National League Cup is the 35th running of the FA Women's National League Cup, which began in 1991. It is the major league cup competition run by the FA Women's National League, and is run alongside their secondary league cup competition, the FA Women's National League Plate.

Teams are initially drawn into 22 groups of four teams who play each other once (not twice), and from which the 22 group winners and 10 best runners-up advance to the Cup knockout stages. The other 12 runners-up, and 20 best third-placed teams advance to the National League Plate knockout stages. From there, both the Cup and the Plate hold four knockout rounds before the finals of each competition.

== Results ==
All results listed are published by the The Football Association / Women's National League. Games are first listed by group in chronological order, and then in alphabetical order of the home team where matches were played simultaneously. For knockout rounds onwards, they are then listed in chronological order, and then in alphabetical order of the home team where matches were played simultaneously.

== Group Stage ==
=== Group A ===
Pos	Div	Team	Pld	W	D	L	GF	GA	GD	Pts	Qualification
1	4	Bridgwater United	3	2	0	1	6	1	+5	6	Knockouts
2	3	Plymouth Argyle	3	2	0	1	3	3	0	6	WNL Plate
3	4	Torquay United	3	1	1	1	2	2	0	4	WNL Plate
4	4	Marine Academy Plymouth	3	0	1	2	2	7	−5	1	

Updated to match(es) played on 27 September 2026. Source: FA Women's National League

26 August 2026	Marine Academy Plymouth	1–2	Plymouth Argyle	Ivybridge
19:45	Turner 15'	Report	Dolbel 72'; Reed 76'	Stadium: Erme Valley; Attendance: 130; Referee: Millie Wheeler-Foulkes

26 August 2026	Torquay United	1–0	Bridgwater United	Newton Abbot
19:45	Stacey 16' (pen.)	Report		Stadium: VX3 Stadium; Attendance: 150; Referee: Amith Vidanage

6 September 2026	Bridgwater United	2–0	Plymouth Argyle	Kenn
14:00	Watkins 1'; Jarvis 45'	Report		Stadium: The Ethan Berry Pavilion; Attendance: 231; Referee: Shaun Thorne

6 September 2026	Marine Academy Plymouth	1–1	Torquay United	Ivybridge
14:00	Drewery 61'	Report	Stacey 83'	Stadium: Erme Valley; Attendance: 150; Referee: Darren Robbins

27 September 2026	Marine Academy Plymouth	0–4	Bridgwater United	Ivybridge
14:00		Report	Hill 16'; Strippel 74'; Williams 79' (pen.), 88'	Stadium: Erme Valley; Attendance: 125; Referee: Mark Dobrijevic

27 September 2026	Plymouth Argyle	1–0	Torquay United	Plymouth
14:00	Brothers 5'	Report		Stadium: Home Park; Attendance: 1,002; Referee: Anthony Blatchford

=== Group B ===
Pos	Div	Team	Pld	W	D	L	GF	GA	GD	Pts	Qualification
1	3	Exeter City	3	2	1	0	11	9	+2	7	Knockouts
2	PGA	Bristol City PGA	3	2	0	1	12	8	+4	6	Knockouts
3	4	Bristol Rovers	3	1	0	2	9	10	−1	3	WNL Plate
4	4	Keynsham Town	3	0	1	2	7	12	−5	1	

Updated to match(es) played on 27 September 2026. Source: FA Women's National League

26 August 2026	Bristol Rovers	4–2	Keynsham Town	Almondsbury
19:45	Tweddle 14', 36'; Viveash 45' (pen.); Mcnama 54'	Report	Mugford 18'; Beale 83'	Stadium: Oaklands Park; Attendance: 320; Referee: Gareth Dunn

26 August 2026	Exeter City	4–3	Bristol City PGA	Newton Abbot
19:45	Baker 14'; Pollock 21'; Sara 45+7'; Pitman 45+15'	Report	Giddinigs 17' (pen.); Gould 45+5', 45+11'	Stadium: Coach Road; Attendance: 84; Referee: Andrew Heapy

6 September 2026	Exeter City	4–3	Bristol Rovers	Newton Abbot
14:00	Papaioannou 8'; Baker 19'; Kendell 32'; Sara 77'	Report	Costa 38'; Exley 82'; Turner 90+5'	Stadium: Coach Road; Attendance: 143; Referee: Luke Fabry

6 September 2026	Keynsham Town	2–5	Bristol City PGA	Keynsham
14:00	Mugford 22'; Todd 71'	Report	Giddinigs 24', 65', 81'; Comley 53'; Gould 62'	Stadium: Crown Field; Attendance: 65; Referee: Jason Lee

27 September 2026	Bristol Rovers	2–4	Bristol City PGA	Yate
14:00	Goal	Report	Dixon 10'; Batty 51'; 55'; Giddings 82'	Stadium: Lodge Road; Attendance: 147; Referee: Stephen Fall

27 September 2026	Keynsham Town	3–3	Exeter City	Keynsham
14:00	Kaneko-Grun 27'; Mugford 34'; Todd 52'	Report	Vaccaro 6', 40'; Pitman 81'	Stadium: Crown Field; Attendance: 40; Referee: Daniel Forrester

=== Group C ===
Pos	Div	Team	Pld	W	D	L	GF	GA	GD	Pts	Qualification
1	3	Cheltenham Town	3	2	1	0	10	5	+5	7	Knockouts
2	4	Kidderminster Harriers	3	2	0	1	3	5	−2	6	WNL Plate
3	4	Gwalia United	3	1	1	1	5	5	0	4	WNL Plate
4	4	Worcester City	3	0	0	3	6	9	−3	0	

Updated to match(es) played on 27 September 2026. Source: FA Women's National League

26 August 2026	Worcester City	0–1	Kidderminster Harriers	Worcester
19:45		Report	Henry 51'	Stadium: Sixways Stadium; Attendance: 250; Referee: Jack Cooper

27 August 2026	Cheltenham Town	1–1	Gwalia United	Bishop's Cleeve
19:45	Murphy 66'	Report	Kehoe 77'	Stadium: Kayte Lane Stadium; Attendance: 102; Referee: Stuart Parker

6 September 2026	Cheltenham Town	4–3	Worcester City	Bishop's Cleeve
14:00	19' (o.g.); Snook 68', 82'; Joyce 84'	Report	Billingsley 24'; Poole 37', 50'	Stadium: Kayte Lane Stadium; Attendance: 195; Referee: Daniel Forrester

6 September 2026	Gwalia United	0–1	Kidderminster Harriers	Pontypridd
14:00		Report	Hiscox 54'	Stadium: University of South Wales Sports Park; Attendance: 158; Referee: Anthony Blatchford

27 September 2026	Kidderminster Harriers	1–5	Cheltenham Town	Droitwich
14:00	Webster-Ford 80'	Report	Jones 10'; Joyce 45+1', 52' (pen.); Snook 83'; Salisbury-Williams 87'	Stadium: King George V Playing Field; Attendance: 70; Referee: Carl Dixon

27 September 2026	Worcester City	3–4	Gwalia United	Worcester
14:00	Welham 51'; Haggett 65' (pen.); Walker 87'	Report	Ackerman 22', 35', 37'; Newns 90+1'	Stadium: Sixways Stadium; Attendance: 202; Referee: Ryan Jennings

=== Group D ===
Pos	Div	Team	Pld	W	D	L	GF	GA	GD	Pts	Qualification
1	PGA	Chelsea PGA	3	3	0	0	9	1	+8	9	Knockouts
2	3	Swindon Town	3	2	0	1	9	6	+3	6	Knockouts
3	4	Maidenhead United	3	1	0	2	6	7	−1	3	WNL Plate
4	4	Wycombe Wanderers	3	0	0	3	3	13	−10	0	

Updated to match(es) played on 27 September 2026. Source: FA Women's National League

26 August 2026	Maidenhead United	2–5	Swindon Town	Maidenhead
19:45	Stockton 19'; Harper 78'	Report	Davies 1', 24', 27'; Sherwood 10'; Macdonald 79'	Stadium: York Road; Attendance: 88; Referee: Robert Folly

27 August 2026	Wycombe Wanderers	0–6	Chelsea PGA	Burnham
19:45		Report	N'Drin 30' (pen.), 57'; Finn 45+2'; Gardiner 66'; Brickell 81'; Pierce 90+2'	Stadium: The 1878 Stadium; Attendance: 139; Referee: Ben Wong

6 September 2026	Swindon Town	1–2	Chelsea PGA	Swindon
14:00	St Clair 1'	Report	Sinclair 64' (pen.), 77' (pen.)	Stadium: Imagine Cruising Stadium; Attendance: 163; Referee: Mark Dobrijevic

6 September 2026	Wycombe Wanderers	1–4	Maidenhead United	Burnham
14:00	Delaney 87'	Report	Goulden 1'; Robertson 20'; Harper 27'; Akerman 45+3'	Stadium: The 1878 Stadium; Attendance: 107; Referee: Ellis Lander

27 September 2026	Maidenhead United	0–1	Chelsea PGA	Maidenhead
14:00		Report	Sinclair 89'	Stadium: York Road; Attendance: 106

27 September 2026	Swindon Town	3–2	Wycombe Wanderers	Swindon
14:00	Waylen 26'; Cook 29'; Colston 73'	Report	Hodges 36'; Makowska 65'	Stadium: Imagine Cruising Stadium; Attendance: 132; Referee: Amith Gunarathna Maha Vidanage

=== Group E ===
Pos	Div	Team	Pld	W	D	L	GF	GA	GD	Pts	Qualification
1	4	Moneyfields	3	2	1	0	5	2	+3	7	Knockouts
2	3	AFC Bournemouth	3	2	0	1	21	4	+17	6	Knockouts
3	PGA	Southampton FC Academy	3	1	0	2	4	13	−9	3	WNL Plate
4	4	Bournemouth Sports FC	3	0	1	2	5	16	−11	1	

Updated to match(es) played on 27 September 2026. Source: FA Women's National League

26 August 2026	Bournemouth Sports FC	3–4	Southampton FC Academy	Christchurch
19:45	Sheffield 5', 60'; Whall 80'	Report	Howard-Mcdonald 45'; Benton-Bryan 73'; Trujillo 83'; Mitchell 90'	Stadium: Chapel Gate; Attendance: 90; Referee: Craig Stiles

27 August 2026	Moneyfields	3–1	AFC Bournemouth	Portsmouth
19:45	Scott 36'; 45+3' (o.g.); Phelps 65'	Report	Westcott 55'	Stadium: The John Jenkins Stadium; Attendance: 151; Referee: Lacey Chivers-Hickton

6 September 2026	AFC Bournemouth	11–1	Bournemouth Sports FC	Weymouth
14:00	Robertson 10', 27'; Aladetoyinbo-Williams 13', 37'; Hall 15', 31', 85'; Bryant 18', 80'; Wilson 43'; Watts 90'	Report	Fox 80'	Stadium: Bob Lucas Stadium; Attendance: 248; Referee: Katie Allen

6 September 2026	Moneyfields	1–0	Southampton FC Academy	Portsmouth
14:00	Jeal 61'	Report		Stadium: The John Jenkins Stadium; Attendance: 65; Referee: Patrick O'Reilly

27 September 2026	AFC Bournemouth	9–0	Southampton FC Academy	Bournemouth
14:00	Wilson 16', 26', 54'; Bryant 30', 87'; James 33'; Markham 45'; Watts 66'; Hall 74'	Report		Stadium: Dean Court; Attendance: 6,480; Referee: Ciara Barker

27 September 2026	Bournemouth Sports FC	1–1	Moneyfields	Christchurch
14:00	Gladwell 1' (pen.)	Report	Tonks 21'	Stadium: Chapel Gate; Attendance: 50; Referee: Luke Fabry

=== Group F ===
Pos	Div	Team	Pld	W	D	L	GF	GA	GD	Pts	Qualification
1	3	Portsmouth	3	3	0	0	8	3	+5	9	Knockouts
2	3	Lewes	3	2	0	1	7	4	+3	6	WNL Plate
3	4	Saltdean United	3	0	1	2	1	4	−3	1	
4	PGA	Brighton & Hove Albion PGA	3	0	1	2	1	6	−5	1	

Updated to match(es) played on 14 October 2026. Source: FA Women's National League

26 August 2026	Portsmouth	2–0	Brighton & Hove Albion PGA	Portsmouth
19:45	Rowbotham 22'; Mallon 55'	Report		Stadium: The John Jenkins Stadium; Attendance: 279; Referee: Stephen Fall

26 August 2026	Lewes	1–0	Saltdean United	Lewes
19:45	Hibbert-Johnson 76'	Report		Stadium: The Dripping Pan; Attendance: 209; Referee: Patrick O'Reilly

6 September 2026	Lewes	4–1	Brighton & Hove Albion PGA	Lewes
14:00	Lue 7'; Pullen 28'; Howells 36'; Carpenter 59'	Report	Price 90+5'	Stadium: The Dripping Pan; Attendance: 303; Referee: Lola Pollard

6 September 2026	Saltdean United	1–3	Portsmouth	Saltdean
14:00	Smith 25'	Report	Mallon 18', 77', 80'	Stadium: Hill Park; Attendance: 138; Referee: Robert Folly

27 September 2026	Portsmouth	3–2	Lewes	Portsmouth
14:00	Roberts 49'; Beattie 70', 78' (pen.)	Report	Grant 7', 45+1'	Stadium: The John Jenkins Stadium; Attendance: 246; Referee: Imogen Hooper

27 September 2026	Saltdean United	A–A	Brighton & Hove Albion PGA	Saltdean
14:00		Report		Stadium: Hill Park
Note: The referee abandoned the match, due to a serious injury. A decision by the FA Women’s National League (WNL) board was made for the match to be replayed in full.

14 October 2026	Saltdean United	0–0	Brighton & Hove Albion PGA	Saltdean
19:30		Report		Stadium: Hill Park; Attendance: 86

=== Group G ===
Pos	Div	Team	Pld	W	D	L	GF	GA	GD	Pts	Qualification
1	3	Norwich City	3	3	0	0	9	3	+6	9	Knockouts
2	4	Stevenage	3	2	0	1	9	7	+2	6	WNL Plate
3	4	Luton Town	3	0	1	2	5	7	−2	1	WNL Plate
4	4	Cambridge United	3	0	1	2	3	9	−6	1	

Updated to match(es) played on 27 September 2026. Source: FA Women's National League

25 August 2026	Norwich City	2–1	Cambridge United	Horsford
19:45	Moore 43'; Hailes 69'	Report	Coupar 16'	Stadium: The Nest; Attendance: 294; Referee: Lorraine Catchpole

25 August 2026	Luton Town	2–3	Stevenage	Barton-le-Clay
19:45	Brooks 70'; Milliken 72'	Report	Wodhams 11'; Savage 17'; Oshodi 20'	Stadium: Sharpenhoe Road; Attendance: 196; Referee: Thomas Binding

6 September 2026	Luton Town	1–2	Norwich City	Barton-le-Clay
14:00	Logie 71'	Report	Daviss 20'; Kennard 32'	Stadium: Sharpenhoe Road; Attendance: 161; Referee: Aidan Jones

6 September 2026	Stevenage	5–0	Cambridge United	Letchworth
15:00	Wiltshire 3', 37', 42'; Deane 6'; Wodhams 68'	Report		Stadium: Herts FA County Ground; Attendance: 111; Referee: Ella Karkoska

27 September 2026	Luton Town	2–2	Cambridge United	Barton-le-Clay
14:00	Heselden 54'; Logie 90+6'	Report	Coupar 38'; Bell 45+4'	Stadium: Sharpenhoe Road; Attendance: 127; Referee: Adam Fox

27 September 2026	Norwich City	5–1	Stevenage	Horsford
14:00	Szczech 37'; Hailes 46'; Harrison 49', 90+2'; Brodie 53'	Report	Wiltshire 47'	Stadium: The Nest; Attendance: 293; Referee: Thomas Amber

=== Group H ===
Pos	Div	Team	Pld	W	D	L	GF	GA	GD	Pts	Qualification
1	4	Actonians	3	2	0	1	19	8	+11	6	Knockouts
2	3	Fulham	3	2	0	1	14	3	+11	6	Knockouts
3	4	Queens Park Rangers	3	2	0	1	9	5	+4	6	WNL Plate
4	4	Ascot United	3	0	0	3	1	27	−26	0	

Updated to match(es) played on 27 September 2026. Source: FA Women's National League

25 August 2026	Actonians	1–4	Fulham	Bedfont
19:45	Chapman 23'	Report	Olds 21', 67'; Lister 44'; Gillies 74'	Stadium: Bedfont Recreation Ground; Attendance: 83; Referee: Amarachi Okamgba

1 September 2026	Ascot United	0–4	Queens Park Rangers	Ascot
19:45		Report	Leach 28'; West 68'; Johnson 71'; Habbal 87'	Stadium: The Racecourse; Attendance: 75; Referee: Luke Rees

6 September 2026	Actonians	13–1	Ascot United	Bedfont
15:00	Fronc 3', 36', 53', 82', 89'; Williams 8', 30', 33'; McCaffrey 12', 47'; Chapman 29'; Griffin 41'; Kargbo 54'	Report	Knight 80'	Stadium: Bedfont Recreation Ground; Attendance: 33; Referee: Elora Hardstaff

6 September 2026	Queens Park Rangers	2–0	Fulham	Hayes
14:00	Bell 43'; Albuery 84'	Report		Stadium: Skyex Community Stadium; Attendance: 145; Referee: Pedro Cotelo

27 September 2026	Fulham	10–0	Ascot United	New Malden
14:00	Olds 9', 13'; Lister 31', 33', 59'; Estcourt 52'; Bennett 57'; Rutherford 66'; Grey 77'; Gillies 87'	Report		Stadium: Motspur Park; Attendance: 202; Referee: Aneta Gellen

27 September 2026	Queens Park Rangers	3–5	Actonians	Shepherd's Bush
14:00	Albuery 24', 66'; Searle 90'	Report	Kargbo 4', 55'; Fronc 11'; Turner 75'; Brown 76'	Stadium: Loftus Road; Attendance: 700; Referee: Nigel Owen

=== Group I ===
Pos	Div	Team	Pld	W	D	L	GF	GA	GD	Pts	Qualification
1	3	Hashtag United	3	3	0	0	7	1	+6	9	Knockouts
2	4	Chatham Town	3	2	0	1	8	3	+5	6	Knockouts
3	PGA	London City Lionesses PGA	3	0	1	2	1	6	−5	1	
4	4	Billericay Town	3	0	1	2	2	8	−6	1	

Updated to match(es) played on 27 September 2026. Source: FA Women's National League

26 August 2026	Chatham Town	3–0	London City Lionesses PGA	Chatham
19:45	Charles 43'; Fordjour 71'; Sareen 82'	Report		Stadium: Bauvil Stadium; Attendance: 183; Referee: Katie Allen

26 August 2026	Hashtag United	3–0	Billericay Town	Barkingside
19:45	Bowers 41'; Snelling 61' (pen.); Adesan 88'	Report		Stadium: Oakside Stadium; Attendance: 85; Referee: Ellis Lander

6 September 2026	Billericay Town	1–1	London City Lionesses PGA	Billericay
14:00	Galbally 87' (pen.)	Report	Marsh 52'	Stadium: New Lodge; Attendance: 103; Referee: Ryan Jennings

6 September 2026	Chatham Town	1–2	Hashtag United	Chatham
14:30	Jones 43' (pen.)	Report	Samways 13'; Snelling 23'	Stadium: Bauvil Stadium; Attendance: 145; Referee: Rosemary Scott

27 September 2026	Billericay Town	1–4	Chatham Town	Billericay
14:00	Rothon 3'	Report	Woodgate 23', 38'; Coombs 45+1'; Jeffkins 90+3'	Stadium: New Lodge; Attendance: 114; Referee: Ceredig Cattanach-Chell

27 September 2026	Hashtag United	2–0	London City Lionesses PGA	Barkingside
15:00	Gillard 63'; Snelling 89'	Report		Stadium: Oakside Stadium; Attendance: 105; Referee: Alexander Vasey

=== Group J ===
Pos	Div	Team	Pld	W	D	L	GF	GA	GD	Pts	Qualification
1	3	AFC Wimbledon	3	3	0	0	8	1	+7	9	Knockouts
2	4	Dulwich Hamlet	3	2	0	1	6	4	+2	6	WNL Plate
3	4	Dartford	3	1	0	2	4	5	−1	3	WNL Plate
4	PGA	Crystal Palace PGA	3	0	0	3	2	10	−8	0	

Updated to match(es) played on 27 September 2026. Source: FA Women's National League

26 August 2026	Dartford	4–1	Crystal Palace PGA	Dartford
19:45	Awan 60', 66'; Griffiths 77'; Mayne 90+1'	Report	Allford 28'	Stadium: Princes Park; Attendance: 153; Referee: Aneta Gellen

6 September 2026	Dulwich Hamlet	2–0	Dartford	East Dulwich
14:00	Fergus 33'; Chisanga 56'	Report		Stadium: Champion Hill; Attendance: 361; Referee: Nigel Owen

20 September 2026	AFC Wimbledon	3–0	Crystal Palace PGA	Morden
14:00	Robert 19'; Jeffery 53'; Ayisi 64'	Report		Stadium: Imperial Fields; Attendance: 188; Referee: Robert Poole

23 September 2026	AFC Wimbledon	3–1	Dulwich Hamlet	Morden
19:45	Dorey 31' (pen.), 53', 65'	Report	Fuller 89'	Stadium: Imperial Fields; Attendance: 156; Referee: Aidan Jones

27 September 2026	Dartford	0–2	AFC Wimbledon	Dartford
14:00		Report	Hotston 45+1'; Ayisi 62'	Stadium: Princes Park; Attendance: 178; Referee: Katie Allen

27 September 2026	Dulwich Hamlet	3–1	Crystal Palace PGA	East Dulwich
14:00	Fergus 4'; Chisanga 45'; Emmerson 71'	Report	Allford 15'	Stadium: Champion Hill; Attendance: 589; Referee: Ali Matour

=== Group K ===
Pos	Div	Team	Pld	W	D	L	GF	GA	GD	Pts	Qualification
1	3	Oxford United	3	2	1	0	14	1	+13	7	Knockouts
2	PGA	Arsenal PGA	3	1	2	0	11	4	+7	5	WNL Plate
3	4	Milton Keynes Dons	3	1	1	1	5	9	−4	4	WNL Plate
4	4	Abingdon United	3	0	0	3	1	17	−16	0	

Updated to match(es) played on 27 September 2026. Source: FA Women's National League

26 August 2026	Abingdon United	0–8	Oxford United	Abingdon-on-Thames
19:45		Report	Gibson 4'; 22' (o.g.); Manders 14', 34', 40'; Quirk 49', 74'; Sealey 76'	Stadium: The Northcourt; Attendance: 207; Referee: Luke Rees

6 September 2026	Abingdon United	0–7	Arsenal PGA	Abingdon-on-Thames
14:00		Report	Antoine 2', 26', 67'; Conway 32'; Tang 44'; Woods 45+1', 90'	Stadium: The Northcourt; Attendance: 195; Referee: Imogen Hooper

6 September 2026	Oxford United	5–0	Milton Keynes Dons	Oxford
14:00	Manders 9', 45+4', 45+7'; Legg 74'; Brant 87'	Report		Stadium: Marsh Lane; Attendance: 262; Referee: Charlotte Sparling-Haythornthwaite

16 September 2026	Milton Keynes Dons	3–3	Arsenal PGA	Bedford
19:45	Carnevale 10'; Lemon 33', 45+5'	Report	Woods 1'; Antoine 11', 18'	Stadium: The New Eyrie; Attendance: 271; Referee: Glenn Capelli

27 September 2026	Milton Keynes Dons	2–1	Abingdon United	Milton Keynes
14:00	Leighton 15'; Pollard 62'	Report	Dyer 6' (pen.)	Stadium: Stadium MK; Attendance: 177; Referee: Peter Kwak

27 September 2026	Oxford United	1–1	Arsenal PGA	Oxford
14:00	Manders 84'	Report	Conway 76'	Stadium: Marsh Lane; Attendance: 332; Referee: Lola Pollard

=== Group L ===
Pos	Div	Team	Pld	W	D	L	GF	GA	GD	Pts	Qualification
1	3	Rugby Borough	3	3	0	0	19	0	+19	9	Knockouts
2	3	Peterborough United	3	2	0	1	13	7	+6	6	Knockouts
3	4	Notts County	3	1	0	2	8	10	−2	3	WNL Plate
4	PGA	Leicester City PGA	3	0	0	3	2	25	−23	0	

Updated to match(es) played on 27 September 2026. Source: FA Women's National League

25 August 2026	Rugby Borough	10–0	Leicester City PGA	Rugby
19:45	Moncaster 10', 29'; Camwell 13', 24', 69'; Mosby 22', 43'; Brown 33'; Gille 51'; Greenslade 77'	Report		Stadium: Kilsby Lane; Attendance: 197; Referee: Mark Bowring

27 August 2026	Peterborough United	6–0	Notts County	Peterborough
19:45	Wilshaw 19', 57'; Ganado 22'; Rai 53'; May 62'; Osker 72'	Report		Stadium: Lincoln Road; Attendance: 127; Referee: Joseph Karram

6 September 2026	Notts County	8–2	Leicester City PGA	Eastwood
14:00	Hardy 23', 44' (pen.); Taylor 27'; Skeldon 31'; Barnes 54'; Brett 58', 71'; Collins 84'	Report	King 41'; Knill 45+3'	Stadium: Bill Stokeld Stadium; Attendance: 52; Referee: Stephanie Heck

6 September 2026	Rugby Borough	7–0	Peterborough United	Rugby
15:00	Mosby 9', 65' (pen.); Camwell 23'; Greenslade 27'; Moncaster 75', 90+4'; Roberts 85'	Report		Stadium: Kilsby Lane; Attendance: 196; Referee: Francesca Catchpole

27 September 2026	Notts County	0–2	Rugby Borough	Eastwood
14:00		Report	Potts 3'; Morris 90'	Stadium: Coronation Park; Attendance: 71; Referee: Arkadiusz Piotrowski

27 September 2026	Peterborough United	7–0	Leicester City PGA	Peterborough
14:00	May 1', 52'; Saunders 3'; Driscoll 30'; Ganado 57'; Andersen 75'; Perkins 89'	Report		Stadium: Lincoln Road; Attendance: 131; Referee: Lois Jefferies

=== Group M ===
Pos	Div	Team	Pld	W	D	L	GF	GA	GD	Pts	Qualification
1	3	Boldmere St. Michaels	3	3	0	0	10	2	+8	9	Knockouts
2	PGA	Aston Villa PGA	3	2	0	1	3	2	+1	6	WNL Plate
3	4	Leafield Athletic	3	1	0	2	3	6	−3	3	WNL Plate
4	4	Sutton Coldfield Town	3	0	0	3	1	7	−6	0	

Updated to match(es) played on 27 September 2026. Source: FA Women's National League

27 August 2026	Boldmere St. Michaels	A–A	Sutton Coldfield Town	Sutton Coldfield
19:45				Stadium: Boldmere Community Stadium

27 August 2026	Leafield Athletic	P–P	Aston Villa PGA	Castle Vale
19:45		Report		Stadium: Vale Stadium

6 September 2026	Boldmere St. Michaels	2–1	Aston Villa PGA	Sutton Coldfield
14:00	Clark 35' (pen.); Wickett 65'	Report	Underwood 84'	Stadium: Boldmere Community Stadium; Attendance: 120; Referee: Emma Beevor

6 September 2026	Sutton Coldfield Town	1–2	Leafield Athletic	Sutton Coldfield
14:00	Kingston 59'	Report	Fraser 76' (pen.); Griffiths 77' (pen.)	Stadium: Central Ground; Attendance: 58; Referee: Kyle Mowbray

17 September 2026	Leafield Athletic	A-W	Aston Villa PGA	Castle Vale
19:45		Report		Stadium: Vale Stadium
Note: Aston Villa were awarded the game after Leafield Athletic were unable to fulfil the fixture.

24 September 2026	Boldmere St. Michaels	3–0	Sutton Coldfield Town	Sutton Coldfield
19:45	Ruparelia 23' (pen.); Quirk 83'; Jones 88'	Report		Stadium: Boldmere Community Stadium; Attendance: 72; Referee: Thomas Binding

27 September 2026	Leafield Athletic	1–5	Boldmere St. Michaels	Castle Vale
14:00	Gallop 59' (pen.)	Report	Jones 5'; Ruparelia 44'; Lawson-Spencer 45+3'; Bailey 58'; Clark 90'	Stadium: Vale Stadium; Attendance: 75; Referee: Charlotte Jacques-Smith

27 September 2026	Sutton Coldfield Town	0–2	Aston Villa PGA	Sutton Coldfield
14:00		Report	Thompson 68'; Merc 71'	Stadium: Central Ground; Attendance: 106; Referee: Liam Ashcroft

=== Group N ===
Pos	Div	Team	Pld	W	D	L	GF	GA	GD	Pts	Qualification
1	3	West Bromwich Albion	3	3	0	0	11	3	+8	9	Knockouts
2	4	Sporting Khalsa	3	2	0	1	5	2	+3	6	WNL Plate
3	4	Lye Town	3	1	0	2	5	9	−4	3	WNL Plate
4	PGA	Birmingham City PGA	3	0	0	3	1	8	−7	0	

Updated to match(es) played on 27 September 2026. Source: FA Women's National League

26 August 2026	Sporting Khalsa	3–0	Lye Town	Willenhall
20:00	Millington 10'; Ratcliffe 45'; Appleby 61'	Report		Stadium: Aspray Arena; Attendance: 100; Referee: Ciara Barker

6 September 2026	Lye Town	2–6	West Bromwich Albion	Lye
14:00	Lote 28', 42'	Report	George 45', 67', 85' (pen.); Collyer 63'; Oakley 73'; (o.g.)	Stadium: The Sports Ground; Attendance: 170; Referee: Robert Pealing

6 September 2026	Sporting Khalsa	2–0	Birmingham City PGA	Willenhall
14:00	Goal	Report		Stadium: Aspray Arena; Attendance: 90; Referee: Peter Brothwell

23 September 2026	West Bromwich Albion	3–1	Birmingham City PGA	West Bromwich
19:45	Collyer 31'; Reynolds 43'; Kirk 59'	Report	Janny 69'	Stadium: The Hawthorns; Attendance: 175; Referee: Stuart Hale

27 September 2026	Lye Town	3–0	Birmingham City PGA	Lye
14:00	Highway 17'; Baptiste 38'; Robinson-Brown 76' (pen.)	Report		Stadium: The Sports Ground; Attendance: 60; Referee: Stuart Hale

27 September 2026	West Bromwich Albion	2–0	Sporting Khalsa	Perry Park
14:00	Collyer 19'; Robinson 76'	Report		Stadium: Alexander Stadium; Attendance: 138; Referee: Charlotte Cochrane

=== Group O ===
Pos	Div	Team	Pld	W	D	L	GF	GA	GD	Pts	Qualification
1	3	Stoke City	3	3	0	0	15	0	+15	9	Knockouts
2	PGA	Manchester City PGA	3	1	1	1	7	6	+1	4	WNL Plate
3	4	Wythenshawe F.C.	3	1	1	1	5	6	−1	4	WNL Plate
4	4	Blackburn Rovers	3	0	0	3	0	15	−15	0	

Source: FA Women's National League

26 August 2026	Blackburn Rovers	0–4	Manchester City PGA	Charnock Richard
19:45		Report	Davis 5'; Burton 30'; Hirons 45'; Foster 89'	Stadium: Mossie Park; Attendance: 146; Referee: Liam Ashcroft

27 August 2026	Wythenshawe F.C.	0–3	Stoke City	Wythenshawe
19:45		Report	Loydon 23'; Stamps 45+2'; Clarke 67'	Stadium: Hollyhedge Park; Attendance: 141; Referee: Aron Connolly

6 September 2026	Stoke City	9–0	Blackburn Rovers	Stone
14:00	Cole 24' (pen.), 41'; 29' (o.g.); Bradley 33'; Stamps 65', 68', 85'; Cook 78'; Quigley 83'	Report		Stadium: Wellbeing Park; Attendance: 87; Referee: Carl Dixon

6 September 2026	Wythenshawe F.C.	3–3	Manchester City PGA	Wythenshawe
14:00	Chambers 8'; Stewart 9'; Dunlop 56'	Report	Colbert-Martin 35'; Stroud 83', 86'	Stadium: Hollyhedge Park; Attendance: 201; Referee: Ryan Bostock

27 September 2026	Blackburn Rovers	0–2	Wythenshawe F.C.	Charnock Richard
14:00		Report	Shannon 53' (pen.); Chambers 77'	Stadium: Mossie Park; Attendance: 110; Referee: Marcin Iwanski

27 September 2026	Stoke City	3–0	Manchester City PGA	Stone
14:00	Bradley 45'; Stamps 58' (pen.); Quigley 70'	Report		Stadium: Wellbeing Park; Attendance: 169; Referee: Hadley Warhurst

=== Group P ===
Pos	Div	Team	Pld	W	D	L	GF	GA	GD	Pts	Qualification
1	3	Real Bedford	3	3	0	0	12	1	+11	9	Knockouts
2	PGA	Tottenham Hotspur PGA	3	2	0	1	8	4	+4	6	Knockouts
3	4	Northampton Town	3	1	0	2	2	6	−4	3	WNL Plate
4	4	London Bees	3	0	0	3	1	12	−11	0	

Updated to match(es) played on 27 September 2026. Source: FA Women's National League

26 August 2026	Real Bedford	5–1	Northampton Town	Bedford
19:45	Whitelock 22'; Delglyn 24', 45' (pen.), 65'; Mehmet 89'	Report	Dade 87' (pen.)	Stadium: McMullen Park; Attendance: 145; Referee: Pedro Cotelo

27 August 2026	London Bees	1–7	Tottenham Hotspur PGA	Edgware
19:45	Wozniak 17'	Report	Oukriss 22' (pen.), 26', 58'; Mace 79'; Pierre 84', 87'; Withey 90+4'	Stadium: The Hive Stadium; Attendance: 85; Referee: Simon Cook

6 September 2026	London Bees	0–4	Real Bedford	Edgware
14:00		Report	Whitelock 2'; Head 11'; Byrom 13', 21'	Stadium: The Hive Stadium; Attendance: 75; Referee: Lydia Orsborn

6 September 2026	Northampton Town	0–1	Tottenham Hotspur PGA	Sixfields
14:00		Report	Summers-Mee 5'	Stadium: Sixfields Stadium; Attendance: 492; Referee: Lois Jefferies

27 September 2026	Northampton Town	1–0	London Bees	Moulton
14:00	Dade 26'	Report		Stadium: O'Riordan Bond Stadium; Attendance: 135; Referee: Gavin Hill

27 September 2026	Real Bedford	3–0	Tottenham Hotspur PGA	Bedford
14:00	Mehmet 36'; Head 62', 90'	Report		Stadium: McMullen Park; Attendance: 250; Referee: Robert Pealing

=== Group Q ===
Pos	Div	Team	Pld	W	D	L	GF	GA	GD	Pts	Qualification
1	3	Liverpool Feds	3	3	0	0	6	0	+6	9	Knockouts
2	4	AFC Fylde	3	2	0	1	7	3	+4	6	Knockouts
3	4	Chorley	3	1	0	2	2	8	−6	3	WNL Plate
4	PGA	Liverpool F.C. PGA	3	0	0	3	2	6	−4	0	

Updated to match(es) played on 27 September 2026. Source: FA Women's National League

27 August 2026	AFC Fylde	3–2	Liverpool F.C. PGA	Warton
19:45	Jukes 46'; Flanagan 78'; Kelly 90+6'	Report	Cartmell 10'; Howson 48'	Stadium: Kellamergh Park; Attendance: 200; Referee: Lee Hurst

27 August 2026	Liverpool Feds	A–A	Chorley	Liverpool
19:45		Report		Stadium: Walton Hall Park; Attendance: 145; Referee: Jamie Law
Note: Abandoned in the 78th minute due to lightning. Fixture replayed on 8 September.

6 September 2026	AFC Fylde	0–1	Liverpool Feds	Warton
14:00		Report	Smith 52' (pen.)	Stadium: Kellamergh Park; Attendance: 172; Referee: Ciara Barker

6 September 2026	Chorley	2–0	Liverpool F.C. PGA	Euxton
14:00	Wong 39'; Jones 60'	Report		Stadium: Jim Fowler Memorial Ground; Attendance: 106; Referee: Charlotte Ivens

8 September 2026	Liverpool Feds	4–0	Chorley	Liverpool
19:45	Duffy 2', 45+3'; Johnson 17'; Walters 33'	Report		Stadium: Walton Hall Park; Attendance: 165; Referee: Liam Ashcroft

27 September 2026	Chorley	0–4	AFC Fylde	Euxton
14:00		Report	Kelly 26' (pen.); Corrigan 42'; Hindley 72', 80'	Stadium: Jim Fowler Memorial Ground; Attendance: 203; Referee: Leigh Gell

27 September 2026	Liverpool Feds	1–0	Liverpool F.C. PGA	Liverpool
14:00	Duffy 43'	Report		Stadium: Walton Hall Park; Attendance: 167; Referee: Nicola Mtetwa

=== Group R ===
Pos	Div	Team	Pld	W	D	L	GF	GA	GD	Pts	Qualification
1	3	Loughborough Lightning	3	2	1	0	12	2	+10	7	Knockouts
2	4	Chesterfield	3	2	1	0	9	4	+5	7	Knockouts
3	PGA	Sheffield United PGA	3	1	0	2	3	6	−3	3	WNL Plate
4	4	Sheffield FC	3	0	0	3	2	14	−12	0	

Updated to match(es) played on 27 September 2026. Source: FA Women's National League

27 August 2026	Loughborough Lightning	A-A	Chesterfield	Loughborough
19:45		Report		Stadium: Loughborough University Stadium

27 August 2026	Sheffield FC	1–2	Sheffield United PGA	Sheffield
20:00	Bartup 36'	Report	Summerfield 5'; Ralph 83'	Stadium: Steel City Stadium; Attendance: 97; Referee: Feiruz Abdullahi

6 September 2026	Sheffield FC	0–8	Loughborough Lightning	Loughborough
14:00		Report	Chads 7', 31', 68'; Conway 45+2'; Rogers 60' (pen.); Langford 85'; Jarowicki 86', 88'	Stadium: Loughborough University Stadium; Attendance: 84; Referee: Gary Sweeney

6 September 2026	Chesterfield	3–1	Sheffield United PGA	Whittington Moor
15:00	Shore 34'; Hallas-Potts 37'; Carter 78' (pen.)	Report	Austin 34'	Stadium: SMH Group Stadium; Attendance: 45; Referee: Alicia Kennedy

17 September 2026	Loughborough Lightning	2–2	Chesterfield	Loughborough
19:45	Spillman 60'; Davies 83'	Report	Fowler 9'; Nowell 26'	Stadium: Loughborough University Stadium; Attendance: 144; Referee: Gavin Hill

27 September 2026	Chesterfield	4–1	Sheffield FC	Whittington Moor
15:00	Fowler 2' (pen.); Nowell 21'; Butterworth 49' (pen.); Marshall 68'	Report	Shepherd 60'	Stadium: SMH Group Stadium; Attendance: 396; Referee: Thomas Halloway

27 September 2026	Loughborough Lightning	2–0	Sheffield United PGA	Loughborough
14:00	Thompson 16'; Spillman 58'	Report		Stadium: Loughborough University Stadium; Attendance: 123; Referee: Stephanie Heck

=== Group S ===
Pos	Div	Team	Pld	W	D	L	GF	GA	GD	Pts	Qualification
1	4	Stockport County	3	2	0	1	7	8	−1	6	Knockouts
2	PGA	Manchester United PGA	3	1	1	1	6	3	+3	4	WNL Plate
3	3	Derby County	3	1	1	1	9	7	+2	4	WNL Plate
4	4	Barnsley Women	3	1	0	2	3	7	−4	3	

Updated to match(es) played on 27 September 2026. Source: FA Women's National League

26 August 2026	Derby County	4–1	Barnsley Women	Mickleover
19:45	Ashton 53'; Stevens 60'; 67' (o.g.); Norton 74'	Report	Walton 70'	Stadium: Station Road; Attendance: 110; Referee: Martin Barnes

26 August 2026	Stockport County	0–4	Manchester United PGA	Stockport
19:45		Report	Smith 15'; Allington 75'; Holt 80'; Hoyland-Lau 89'	Stadium: The Ground Up Solutions Stadium; Attendance: 212; Referee: Jahangir Hussain

6 September 2026	Stockport County	2–0	Barnsley Women	Stockport
14:00	Fletcher 5', 32'	Report		Stadium: The Ground Up Solutions Stadium; Attendance: 108; Referee: Martin Flynn

6 September 2026	Derby County	1–1	Manchester United PGA	Mickleover
14:00	Norton 22'	Report	Anderson 44'	Stadium: Station Road; Attendance: 298; Referee: Aron Connolly

27 September 2026	Barnsley Women	2–1	Manchester United PGA	Sheffield
14:00	Fozzard 45+3'; Jarvis 77'	Report	Mulcahy 72'	Stadium: Steel City Stadium; Attendance: 240; Referee: Feiruz Abdullahi

27 September 2026	Derby County	4–5	Stockport County	Mickleover
14:00	Stevens 15' (pen.); Kennerley 43', 65', 73'	Report	Bradshaw 31', 87'; Podmore 54'; Boydell 61', 74'	Stadium: Station Road; Attendance: 214; Referee: Corey Green

=== Group T ===
Pos	Div	Team	Pld	W	D	L	GF	GA	GD	Pts	Qualification
1	4	Leeds United	3	3	0	0	10	3	+7	9	Knockouts
2	3	Huddersfield Town	3	2	0	1	5	4	+1	6	WNL Plate
3	4	Halifax F.C.	3	1	0	2	6	5	+1	3	WNL Plate
4	4	Bradford City	3	0	0	3	1	10	−9	0	

Updated to match(es) played on 27 September 2026. Source: FA Women's National League

26 August 2026	Huddersfield Town	3–0	Bradford City	Emley
19:45	Biggins 60'; Kelly 72'; Elford 88'	Report		Stadium: The Fantastic Media Welfare Ground; Attendance: 78; Referee: Marcin Iwanski

27 August 2026	Halifax F.C.	2–3	Leeds United	Bradford
19:45	Hammond-Mclean 33'; Rhodes-Andrews 58' (pen.)	Report	Woodruff 9', 43'; Dixon 76'	Stadium: Myra Shay Park; Attendance: 120; Referee: Charlotte Cochrane

6 September 2026	Bradford City	0–3	Halifax F.C.	Keighley
14:00		Report	Crompton 19'; Rhodes-Andrews 44'; Renwick 71' (pen.)	Stadium: Cougar Park; Attendance: 100; Referee: Feiruz Abdullahi

6 September 2026	Leeds United	3–0	Huddersfield Town	Garforth
14:00	Dean 9'; Woodruff 62'; Smith 81'	Report		Stadium: Bannister Prentice Stadium; Attendance: 204; Referee: Laura Van Lier

27 September 2026	Bradford City	1–4	Leeds United	Silsden
14:00	Markey 55'	Report	Watson 16'; Jacobs 27' (o.g.); Greene 50'; Hughes 65'	Stadium: The Regal Interiors Stadium; Attendance: 150; Referee: Martin Barnes

27 September 2026	Halifax F.C.	1–2	Huddersfield Town	Bradford
14:00	Renwick 45+4'	Report	Lightfoot 18'; Kelly 65'	Stadium: Myra Shay Park; Attendance: 115; Referee: Jessica Knapp

=== Group U ===
Pos	Div	Team	Pld	W	D	L	GF	GA	GD	Pts	Qualification
1	3	Hull City	3	3	0	0	5	2	+3	9	Knockouts
2	4	Norton & Stockton Ancients	3	2	0	1	12	5	+7	6	Knockouts
3	4	York City	3	1	0	2	4	5	−1	3	WNL Plate
4	4	Thornaby	3	0	0	3	2	11	−9	0	

Updated to match(es) played on 27 September 2026. Source: FA Women's National League

26 August 2026	York City	A–A	Hull City	York
19:45		Report		Stadium: University of York Sports Centre; Referee: Jonathan Walker
Note: Abandoned in the 80th minute. Fixture replayed on 9 September.

27 August 2026	Thornaby	1–7	Norton & Stockton Ancients	Thornaby-on-Tees
19:45	Curle	Report	(o.g.); Millward,, Owens, Patrick	Stadium: Teesdale Park; Attendance: 113; Referee: Ethan Nundy

6 September 2026	Hull City	2–1	Thornaby	Goole
14:00	Tanser 50' (pen.); Andrew 90' (pen.)	Report	Dale 25'	Stadium: Victoria Pleasure Ground; Attendance: 98; Referee: Ross Potten

6 September 2026	Norton & Stockton Ancients	4–2	York City	Stockton-on-Tees
14:00	Millward 2', 11'; Atkinson 14'; Owens 38'	Report	Martin 40' (pen.); Astle 70' (pen.)	Stadium: Norton Sports Complex; Attendance: 75; Referee: John Davison

9 September 2026	York City	0–1	Hull City	York
19:45		Report	Wilkinson 59'	Stadium: Fairfax Plant Hire Stadium; Attendance: 155; Referee: Jonathan Walker

27 September 2026	Hull City	2–1	Norton & Stockton Ancients	North Ferriby
14:00	Tanser 31'; Andrew 45+1'	Report	Owens 14'	Stadium: Eon Visual Media Stadium; Attendance: 179; Referee: Laura Van Lier

27 September 2026	Thornaby	0–2	York City	Thornaby-on-Tees
14:00		Report	Knight 51', 80'	Stadium: Teesdale Park; Attendance: 71; Referee: Abigail Greenwood

=== Group V ===
Pos	Div	Team	Pld	W	D	L	GF	GA	GD	Pts	Qualification
1	3	Middlesbrough	3	2	1	0	7	1	+6	7	Knockouts
2	4	Durham Cestria	3	1	1	1	4	2	+2	4	WNL Plate
3	4	Chester-le-Street Town	3	1	1	1	6	6	0	4	WNL Plate
4	PGA	Sunderland PGA	3	0	1	2	3	11	−8	1	

Updated to match(es) played on 27 September 2026. Source: FA Women's National League

27 August 2026	Chester-le-Street Town	3–3	Sunderland PGA	Chester-le-Street
19:45	Ellison 17'; Gibson 34'; Hockaday 44'	Report	Duffy 1'; Parker 18'; Campbell 52'	Stadium: Moor Park; Attendance: 94; Referee: Emmanuel Arakpogun

27 August 2026	Durham Cestria	0–0	Middlesbrough	Shildon
19:45		Report		Stadium: Dean Street; Attendance: 90; Referee: Nathan Alexander

6 September 2026	Chester-le-Street Town	2–1	Durham Cestria	Chester-le-Street
14:00	Ellison 55'; Gibson 76'	Report	Monkhouse 57'	Stadium: Moor Park; Attendance: 77; Referee: Abigail Greenwood

6 September 2026	Middlesbrough	5–0	Sunderland PGA	Stockton-on-Tees
14:00	Ferguson 46', 74' (pen.); Maxwell 76', 78'; Turnbull 90'	Report		Stadium: Bishopton Road West; Attendance: 235; Referee: Ryan Hetherington

27 September 2026	Durham Cestria	3–0	Sunderland PGA	Shildon
14:00	Gibbon 18'; Ward 34'; Atkinson 39'	Report		Stadium: Dean Street; Attendance: 61; Referee: Samuel Packer

27 September 2026	Middlesbrough	2–1	Chester-le-Street Town	Stockton-on-Tees
14:00	Turnbull 80'; Galloway 82' (pen.)	Report	Hockaday 70'	Stadium: Bishopton Road West; Attendance: 276; Referee: Alicia Kennedy

== Ranking of second-placed teams ==
Pos	Team	Pld	W	D	L	GF	GA	GD	Pts	Qualification
1	Chesterfield	3	2	1	0	9	4	+5	7	Knockouts
2	AFC Bournemouth	3	2	0	1	21	4	+17	6	Knockouts
3	Fulham	3	2	0	1	14	3	+11	6	Knockouts
4	Norton & Stockton Ancients	3	2	0	1	12	5	+7	6	Knockouts
5	Peterborough United	3	2	0	1	13	7	+6	6	Knockouts
6	Chatham Town	3	2	0	1	8	3	+5	6	Knockouts
7	Bristol City PGA	3	2	0	1	12	8	+4	6	Knockouts
8	Tottenham Hotspur PGA	3	2	0	1	8	4	+4	6	Knockouts
9	AFC Fylde	3	2	0	1	7	3	+4	6	Knockouts
10	Swindon Town	3	2	0	1	9	6	+3	6	Knockouts
11	Lewes	3	2	0	1	7	4	+3	6	WNL Plate
12	Sporting Khalsa	3	2	0	1	5	2	+3	6	WNL Plate
13	Stevenage	3	2	0	1	9	7	+2	6	WNL Plate
14	Dulwich Hamlet	3	2	0	1	6	4	+2	6	WNL Plate
15	Huddersfield Town	3	2	0	1	5	4	+1	6	WNL Plate
16	Aston Villa PGA	3	2	0	1	3	2	+1	6	WNL Plate
17	Plymouth Argyle	3	2	0	1	3	3	0	6	WNL Plate
18	Kidderminster Harriers	3	2	0	1	3	5	−2	6	WNL Plate
19	Arsenal PGA	3	1	2	0	11	4	+7	5	WNL Plate
20	Manchester United PGA	3	1	1	1	6	3	+3	4	WNL Plate
21	Durham Cestria	3	1	1	1	4	2	+2	4	WNL Plate
22	Manchester City PGA	3	1	1	1	7	6	+1	4	WNL Plate

== Ranking of third-placed teams ==
Pos	Team	Pld	W	D	L	GF	GA	GD	Pts	Qualification
1	Queens Park Rangers	3	2	0	1	9	5	+4	6	WNL Plate
2	Derby County	3	1	1	1	9	7	+2	4	WNL Plate
3	Chester-le-Street Town	3	1	1	1	6	6	0	4	WNL Plate
4	Gwalia United	3	1	1	1	5	5	0	4	WNL Plate
5	Torquay United	3	1	1	1	2	2	0	4	WNL Plate
6	Wythenshawe F.C.	3	1	1	1	5	6	−1	4	WNL Plate
7	Milton Keynes Dons	3	1	1	1	5	9	−4	4	WNL Plate
8	Halifax F.C.	3	1	0	2	6	5	+1	3	WNL Plate
9	Bristol Rovers	3	1	0	2	9	10	−1	3	WNL Plate
10	Maidenhead United	3	1	0	2	6	7	−1	3	WNL Plate
11	Dartford	3	1	0	2	4	5	−1	3	WNL Plate
12	York City	3	1	0	2	4	5	−1	3	WNL Plate
13	Notts County	3	1	0	2	8	10	−2	3	WNL Plate
14	Leafield Athletic	3	1	0	2	3	6	−3	3	WNL Plate
15	Sheffield United PGA	3	1	0	2	3	6	−3	3	WNL Plate
16	Lye Town	3	1	0	2	5	9	−4	3	WNL Plate
17	Northampton Town	3	1	0	2	2	6	−4	3	WNL Plate
18	Chorley	3	1	0	2	2	8	−6	3	WNL Plate
19	Southampton FC Academy	3	1	0	2	4	13	−9	3	WNL Plate
20	Luton Town	3	0	1	2	5	7	−2	1	WNL Plate
21	Saltdean United	3	0	1	2	1	4	−3	1	
22	London City Lionesses PGA	3	0	1	2	1	6	−5	1	

== Knockout Stage ==
=== First round ===
The first round draw was made on 30 Sept. 2026.

1 November 2026	AFC Fylde (N1)	1–1 (3–4 p)	Hull City (N)	Warton
14:00	Borrowdale 18'	Report	Hamill 90+6'	Stadium: Kellamergh Park; Attendance: 95; Referee: Feiruz Abdullahi
	Penalties
	Boylan (penalty missed); Hickson (penalty scored); Seed (penalty scored); James (penalty scored)		(penalty scored) Nicholson; (penalty scored) Tanser; (penalty scored) Ackroyd; (penalty scored) Gibrill-Keating

1 November 2026	AFC Wimbledon (S)	0–1	AFC Bournemouth (S)	Morden
14:00		Report	James 67' (pen.)	Stadium: Imperial Fields; Attendance: 171; Referee: Jason Lee

1 November 2026	Chatham Town (SE1)	3–3 (3–5 p)	Exeter City (S)	Chatham
14:00	Woodgate 8'; Iton 37'; Jones 90+2' (pen.)	Report	McGowan 29'; Zuurmond 49'; Sara 56'	Stadium: Bauvill Stadium; Attendance: 246; Referee: Patrick O'Reilly
	Penalties
	Penalty scored Penalty missed		(penalty scored) Llewellyn; (penalty scored) Papaioannou; (penalty scored) Lewis; (penalty scored) Vaccaro; (penalty scored) Whitmore

1 November 2026	Cheltenham Town (S)	1–1 (4–2 p)	Bristol City PGA (PGA)	Bishop's Cleeve
14:00	Snook 62'	Report	Dixon 68'	Stadium: Kayte Lane; Attendance: 255; Referee: Stuart Hale
	Penalties
	Joyce (penalty scored); Snook (penalty missed); Hall (penalty scored); Salisbury-Williams (penalty scored); Evans (penalty scored)		Penalty missed Penalty scored

1 November 2026	Loughborough Lightning (N)	2–4	Stoke City (N)	Loughborough
14:00	Ramon 45+2'; Hogg 85'	Report	Bradley 12'; Stamps 43', 82'; Kivel 44'	Stadium: Loughborough University Stadium; Attendance: 167; Referee: Sophie Perry

1 November 2026	Moneyfields (SW1)	2–2 (1–3 p)	Actonians (SE1)	Portsmouth
14:00	Surin 36'; Buckingham 53'	Report	Lalani 12'; Griffin 38'	Stadium: John Jenkins Stadium; Attendance: 46; Referee: Rachel Swett
	Penalties
	Grainger (penalty scored); Buckingham (penalty missed); Henry (penalty missed); Surin (penalty missed)		(penalty scored) Karakus; (penalty scored) Francis-Weir; (penalty scored) Turner; (penalty missed) Griffin

1 November 2026	Norton & Stockton Ancients (N1)	0–3	West Bromwich Albion (N)	Stockton-on-Tees
14:00		Report	Haughey 37', 50'; Round 45+3'	Stadium: Norton Sports Complex; Attendance: 94; Referee: Nathan Alexander

1 November 2026	Norwich City (N)	4–0	Peterborough United (N)	Horsford
14:00	Moore 43'; Groves 45'; Martin 45+2'; Densley 87'	Report		Stadium: The Nest; Attendance: 215; Referee: Ella Karkoska

1 November 2026	Oxford United (S)	1–1 (3–4 p)	Chelsea PGA (PGA)	Marston
14:00	Legg 44'	Report	Gardiner 27'	Stadium: The MGroup Stadium; Attendance: 248; Referee: Ali Matour
	Penalties
	Thompson (penalty scored); Casley (penalty scored); Palmer (penalty scored); Brant (penalty missed); Manders (penalty missed)		Penalty scored Penalty missed

1 November 2026	Portsmouth (S)	1–1 (4–5 p)	Fulham (S)	Portsmouth
14:00	Suttie 28'	Report	Dean 40'	Stadium: PMC Stadium; Attendance: 290; Referee: Luke Fabry
	Penalties
	Barratt (penalty scored); Wilson (penalty scored); Freeland (penalty missed); Beattie (penalty scored); Cull (penalty scored)		(penalty scored) Olds; (penalty scored) Estcourt; (penalty scored) Lister; (penalty scored) Dungate; (penalty scored) Bradley

1 November 2026	Stockport County (N1)	2–0	Chesterfield (M1)	Cheadle
14:00	Anderson 7'; Fishwick 82'	Report		Stadium: Park Road Stadium; Attendance: 120; Referee: Martin Flynn

1 November 2026	Rugby Borough (N)	3–0	Boldmere St. Michaels (N)	Rugby
15:00	Greenslade 32' (pen.); Gille 56'; Camwell 86'	Report		Stadium: Kilsby Lane; Attendance: 174; Referee: Lois Jefferies

8 November 2026	Bridgwater United (SW1)	4–1	Tottenham Hotspur PGA (PGA)	Westonzoyland
14:00	Strippel 17'; Kretteis 34', 44'; Jarvis 45+16'	Report	Bellwood 87' (pen.)	Stadium: The Ethan Berry Pavilion; Attendance: 403; Referee: Gareth Dunn

8 November 2026	Middlesbrough (N)	1–3	Real Bedford (S)	Stockton
14:00	Galloway 4' (pen.)	Report	Head 5' (pen.), 31'; Komani 74'	Stadium: Bishopton Road West; Attendance: 257; Referee: Jonathan Walker

29 November 2026	Hashtag United (S)	v	Swindon Town (S)	Barkingside
14:00				Stadium: Techsoc.Com Stadium; Referee: Katie Allen

29 November 2026	Liverpool Feds (N)	v	Leeds United (N1)	Liverpool
14:00		Report		Stadium: Walton Hall Park; Referee: Feiruz Abdullahi

=== Second Round ===
All games are scheduled to be played on 20 December 2026. The draw for the second round was made on 4 November 2026.

20 December 2026	Actonians (SE1)	v	Fulham (S)
TBD GMT

20 December 2026	Bridgwater United (SW1)	v	Chelsea PGA (PGA)
TBD GMT

20 December 2026	Cheltenham Town (S)	v	AFC Bournemouth (S)
TBD GMT

20 December 2026	Exeter City (S)	v	Hashtag United (S) or Swindon Town (S)
TBD GMT

20 December 2026	Hull City (N)	v	West Bromwich Albion (N)
TBD GMT

20 December 2026	Real Bedford (S)	v	Norwich City (N)
TBD GMT

20 December 2026	Stockport County (N1)	v	Liverpool Feds (N) or Leeds United (N1)
TBD GMT

20 December 2026	Stoke City (N)	v	Rugby Borough (N)
TBD GMT
