= 2026–27 Middlesbrough F.C. Women season =

Middlesbrough
2026–27 season
- Chairman: Steve Gibson
- Head coach: Joe Lillie
- Stadium: Bishopton Road West; Riverside Stadium
Home colours	Away colours	Third colours

The 2026–27 season is the 51st season of competitive football in the history of Middlesbrough Football Club Women, and their second consecutive season in the National League North, the third level of English women's football. The club will also participate in the FA Cup, and the WNL Cup.

The season marks the 150th anniversary for the club as a whole, and is the first season to feature the 2026 crest.

== Squad ==
As of 16 August 2026.

Note: Flags indicate national team as defined under FIFA eligibility rules; some limited exceptions apply. Players may hold more than one non-FIFA nationality.

No.	Pos.	Nation	Player
1	GK	ENG	Megan Borthwick
2	DF	ENG	Ellie Christon
3	DF	NIR	Sarah Robson
4	DF	ENG	Olivia Watt
5	DF	ENG	Ellen Packham
6	DF	ENG	Abby Towers
7	FW	ENG	Ellen Turnbull
8	MF	ENG	Leanna Giles
9	FW	ENG	Armani Maxwell
10	MF	ENG	Lauren Robson
11	FW	ENG	Bridget Galloway
12	FW	ENG	Erin Nelson

No.	Pos.	Nation	Player
13	GK	ENG	Ruby Cook
14	MF	ENG	Niamh Boothroyd (on loan from Sunderland)
15	MF	ENG	Eva Chapman
16	DF	ENG	Lois Husband
17	DF	ENG	Millie Bell
18	MF	ENG	Sarah Burn
19	FW	ENG	Becky Ferguson
20	FW	ENG	Annie Mitchell
22	DF	ENG	Grace Boyes
24	DF	ENG	Keira Skelton
25	FW	ENG	Maddie Myers
31	GK	ENG	Jessica Black

== Transfers ==
=== In ===
Date	Position	Nationality	Name	From	Ref.
15 June 2026	DF	(Northern Ireland)	Sarah Robson	(England) Durham	
22 June 2026	DF	(England)	Ellie Christon	(Poland) Orlen Gdańsk	
29 June 2026	FW	(England)	Bridget Galloway	(Scotland) Aberdeen	
11 August 2026	MF	(England)	Ava Chapman	(England) Newcastle United	
28 October 2026	FW	(England)	Tyler Dodds	Free agent	

=== Loans in ===
Date	Position	Nationality	Name	From	Until	Ref.
29 July 2026	MF	(England)	Niamh Boothroyd	(England) Sunderland	End of season	

== Pre-season and friendlies ==
On 28 June, Middlesbrough announced a pre-season fixture against Scottish Premier League side Celtic.

19 July 2026 Friendly	Middlesbrough	1−0	Celtic	Redcar
14:00 BST	Ferguson 62'	Report		Stadium: Green Lane

== Competitions ==
=== National League North ===
==== League table ====
Pos	Team	Pld	W	D	L	GF	GA	GD	Pts	Qualification
8	Norwich City	9	2	5	2	11	11	0	11	
9	Loughborough Lightning	9	2	2	5	11	19	−8	8	
10	Middlesbrough	9	2	1	6	4	10	−6	7	
11	Boldmere St. Michaels	9	1	3	5	12	25	−13	6	Relegation to FA WNL Division One
12	Hull City	9	1	1	7	7	18	−11	4	Relegation to FA WNL Division One

Updated to match(es) played on 28 October 2026. Source: FA Women's National League
Rules for classification: 1) Points; 2) Goal difference; 3) Number of goals scored

==== Results summary ====
Overall								Home						Away					
Pld	W	D	L	GF	GA	GD	Pts	W	D	L	GF	GA	GD	W	D	L	GF	GA	GD
9	2	1	6	4	10	−6	7	2	1	2	3	4	−1	0	0	4	1	6	−5

Last updated: 1 November 2026.
Source: Soccerway

==== Results by round ====
Round	1	2	3	4	5	6	7	8	9	10	11	12	13	14	15	16	17	18	19	20	21	22
Ground	A	H	A	H	A	H	H	A	H													
Result	L	W	L	L	L	L	D	L	W													
Position	9	6	7	9	10	12	11	11	10													
Points	0	3	3	3	3	3	4	4	7													

Updated to match(es) played on 1 November 2026. Source: Soccerway
A = Away; H = Home; W = Win; D = Draw; L = Loss

==== Matches ====
The FA Women's National League fixtures were released on 15 July.

16 August 2026 1	Boldmere St. Michaels	1−0	Middlesbrough	Sutton Coldfield
14:00 BST	Hughes 15'	Report		Stadium: Amber Arena and Community Stadium; Referee: Charlotte Cochrane

23 August 2026 2	Middlesbrough	1−0	West Bromwich Albion	Stockton
14:00 BST	Watt 17'	Report		Stadium: Bishopton Road West; Referee: Abigail Greenwood

30 August 2026 3	Derby County	1−0	Middlesbrough	Mickleover
14:00 BST	O'Connor 44'	Report		Stadium: Don Amott Arena; Referee: Ciara Barker

13 September 2026 4	Middlesbrough	0−2	Rugby Borough	Stockton
14:00 BST		Report	Wiseman 29'; Moncaster 38'	Stadium: Bishopton Road West; Referee: Marcin Iwanski

20 September 2026 5	Liverpool Feds	1−0	Middlesbrough	Walton
14:00 BST	Brady 63'	Report		Stadium: Walton Hall Park; Referee: Thomas Halloway

4 October 2026 6	Middlesbrough	0–1	Peterborough United	Stockton
14:00 BST		Report	Brown 40'	Stadium: Bishopton Road West; Referee: Samuel Packer

11 October 2026 7	Middlesbrough	1–1	Norwich City	Stockton
14:00 BST	Own Goal 74'	Report	Symonds 22' (pen.)	Stadium: Bishopton Road West; Referee: Nathan Alexander

18 October 2026 8	Huddersfield Town	3–1	Middlesbrough	Huddersfield
14:00 BST	Livingston 15'; Elford 22', 56'	Report	Galloway 88'	Stadium: Stafflex Arena; Referee: Leigh Gell

28 October 2026 9	Middlesbrough	1–0	Hull City	Stockton
19:45 GMT	Robson 88'	Report		Stadium: Bishopton Road West; Referee: Marcin Iwanski

8 November 2026 10	Stoke City	v	Middlesbrough	Stone
14:00 GMT				Stadium: Wellbeing Park

22 November 2026 11	Middlesbrough	v	Loughborough Lightning	Stockton
14:00 GMT				Stadium: Bishopton Road West

6 December 2026 12	Middlesbrough	v	Boldmere St. Michaels	Stockton
14:00 GMT				Stadium: Bishopton Road West

10 January 2027 13	West Bromwich Albion	v	Middlesbrough	Birmingham
14:00 GMT				Stadium: Alexander Stadium

24 January 2027 14	Middlesbrough	v	Derby County	Stockton
14:00 GMT				Stadium: Bishopton Road West

7 February 2027 15	Rugby Borough	v	Middlesbrough	Rugby
14:00 GMT				Stadium: Kilsby Lane

9 February 2027 16	Hull City	v	Middlesbrough	North Ferriby
19:45 GMT				Stadium: Versa Sportswear Stadium

28 February 2027 17	Middlesbrough	v	Stoke City	Stockton
14:00 GMT				Stadium: Bishopton Road West

14 March 2027 18	Middlesbrough	v	Liverpool Feds	Stockton
14:00 GMT				Stadium: Bishopton Road West

28 March 2027 19	Peterborough United	v	Middlesbrough	Peterborough
14:00 GMT				Stadium: Lincoln Road

4 April 2027 20	Norwich City	v	Middlesbrough	Horsford
14:00 GMT				Stadium: The Nest

18 April 2027 21	Middlesbrough	v	Huddersfield Town	Stockton
14:00 GMT				Stadium: Bishopton Road West

2 May 2027 22	Loughborough Lightning	v	Middlesbrough	Loughborough
14:00 GMT				Stadium: Loughborough University

=== FA Cup ===
As a member of the third tier, Middlesbrough entered the FA Cup in the first round.

1 November 2026 First round	Huddersfield Town	1–2	Middlesbrough	Emley
14:00 GMT	Livingston 62'	Report	Galloway 30'; Turnbull 47'	Stadium: Welfare Ground

=== WNL Cup ===
==== Group stage ====
Pos	Div	Team	Pld	W	D	L	GF	GA	GD	Pts	Qualification
1	3	Middlesbrough	3	2	1	0	7	1	+6	7	WNL Cup Knockouts
2	4	Durham Cestria	3	1	1	1	4	2	+2	4	WNL Plate
3	4	Chester-le-Street Town	3	1	1	1	6	6	0	4	WNL Plate
4	PGA	Sunderland PGA	3	0	1	2	3	11	−8	1	

Updated to match(es) played on 27 September 2026. Source: FA Women's National League

27 August 2026 1	Durham Cestria	0−0	Middlesbrough	Shildon
19:45 BST		Report		Stadium: Dean Street; Referee: Nathan Alexander

6 September 2026 2	Middlesbrough	5−0	Sunderland PGA	Stockton
14:00 BST	Ferguson 46', 74' (pen.); Maxwell 76', 78'; Turnbull 90'	Report		Stadium: Bishopton Road West; Referee: Ryan Hetherington

27 September 2026 3	Middlesbrough	2−1	Chester-le-Street Town	Stockton
14:00 BST	Turnbull 80'; Galloway 82' (pen.)	Report	Hockaday 70'	Stadium: Bishopton Road West; Referee: Alicia Kennedy

==== Knockout stage ====
First round	Middlesbrough	v	Real Bedford	Stockton
14:00 GMT				Stadium: Bishopton Road West
