= Keith Stroud =

English football referee

- Full name: Keith Paul Stroud
- Born: 12 August 1969 (age 57)

Domestic
Years	League	Role
2004–2007	Wessex League	Referee
?–2004	Football Conference South	Referee
1999–2002	Football League	Asst. referee
2002–2004	Premier League	Asst. referee
2004–2007	Football League	Referee
2007–2010	Premier League	Referee
2010–2024	Football League	Referee

International
Years	League	Role
2003–2005	FIFA listed	Asst. referee

Keith Paul Stroud (born 12 August 1969) is a former professional English football referee who officiated in the Football League. He currently works as a referee coach for the PGMOL.

== Career ==
Stroud first took up refereeing in 1988. He progressed via the Wessex League, becoming a National List assistant referee in 2000 and a Select Group assistant referee in 2002. Also in 2002, he was an assistant referee for the old Division Three play-off final at the Millennium Stadium, Cardiff, between Cheltenham Town and Rushden & Diamonds. Stroud was appointed as one of the assistant referees to Graham Barber during the FA Cup Final 2003, when Arsenal defeated Southampton 1–0, again at the Millennium Stadium, on 17 May 2003.

Stroud was promoted from the Football Conference to the National List of referees in 2004 and became a FIFA assistant referee in the same year. His first Football League match in control was the League Two encounter between Cheltenham Town and Scunthorpe United at Whaddon Road on 10 August 2004, which finished as a 2–0 away win. Also in that year, he was in charge of the Football Conference play-off final, at Stoke's Britannia Stadium, which saw Shrewsbury beat Aldershot 3–0 on penalties, following a 1–1 scoreline after extra time.

Stroud handled a League One play-off semi-final first leg in 2006 and a League Two play-off semi-final first leg in 2007.

During the 2006–07 season, Stroud was 'trialled' for the Premier League, being given the match on 17 March 2007 between Middlesbrough and Manchester City at the Riverside Stadium, which City won 2–0. Stroud cautioned three players. On 26 July 2007, a press release from the Professional Game Match Officials Limited, which employs Premier League referees full-time, stated that he had been included in the Select Group of 19 referees for the 2007–08 season. At the same time, he stepped down from the FIFA list of assistant referees.

Stroud is also currently the Referees' Development Manager for the Hampshire Football Association. On 3 January 2012, Stroud became the chief executive of the Bedfordshire Football Association.

On 2 August 2013, Stroud officiated the match between Sheffield United and Notts County, kicking off the 125th year of the Football League.

Stroud has been a Luton Town fan from a young age and therefore, does not officiate any of The Hatters' fixtures.

Stroud retired at the end of the 2023-24 season to take up a role as a coach for the PGMOL

=== Career statistics ===
Season	Games	Total (yellow card)	(yellow card) per game	Total (red card)	(red card) per game
2003–04	8	30	3.75	2	0.25
2004–05	30	113	3.77	1	0.03
2005–06	39	139	3.56	9	0.23
2006–07	38	96	2.52	3	0.08
2007–08	34	111	3.26	6	0.17
2008–09	32	110	3.44	6	0.19
2009–10	27	108	4.00	10	0.37
2010–11	33	125	3.79	9	0.27
2011–12	39	121	3.10	6	0.15
2012–13	39	160	4.10	10	0.26
2013–14	38	168	4.42	7	0.18
2014–15	41	183	4.46	7	0.17
2015–16	45	191	4.24	11	0.24
2016–17	39	171	4.38	12	0.31
2017–18	33	134	4.06	7	0.21
2018–19	29	92	3.17	3	0.10
2019–20	32	106	3.31	4	0.13
2020–21	38	106	2.79	2	0.05
2021–22	33	145	4.39	5	0.15
2022–23	38	192	5.05	5	0.13

Statistics are for all competitions.
