= Bedfordshire County Football Association =

Governing body of association football in Bedfordshire, England

Bedfordshire Football Association
- Formation: 1894
- Headquarters: Century House; Skimpot Road
- Location(s): Dunstable Bedfordshire LU5 4JU
- Website: bedfordshirefa.com

The Bedfordshire Football Association, also simply known as Bedfordshire FA, is the governing body of football in the county of Bedfordshire, England. Founded in 1894, the Bedfordshire FA run a number of cups at different levels for teams across Bedfordshire.

== History and Organisation ==
The Bedfordshire Football Association was founded in 1894 when an invitation was sent from Mr. G.H. Barford of the Luton Town club to all clubs in the county to attend a meeting at the Cowper Arms Coffee Tavern in Luton.

On 18 January 1894 the 'Luton News' newspaper reported that the meeting was attended by "a good muster of young men representing the junior clubs and others interested in the welfare of football" who were in favour of a County Football Association being formed. One month later the association was officially formed and the first annual general meeting was held on 30 August of the same year, electing Mr G.H. Barford as the association's first president.

The Bedfordshire Football Association has been in existence for over 100 years and nowadays can claim a membership of over 300 clubs in Bedfordshire. The association has its own headquarters at Century House, Dunstable.

The Bedfordshire FA recognises that football development and improved governance of the game, including administration improvements, are essential in order that everyone who wants to can become involved in football.

== Affiliated leagues ==
=== Men's Saturday Leagues ===
- Spartan South Midlands League**
- Bedfordshire County League**

Footnote: **Part of the English football league system.

=== Small Sided Leagues ===
- AGP Leagues – Bedfordshire FA
- Bedford 6 a side League (Leisure Leagues)
- Luton (Mundial)
- Soccer PM League – Bedford

=== Men's Sunday Leagues ===
- Bedford and District Sunday League
- North Home Counties Sunday League
- Leighton and District Sunday League

=== Ladies and Girls Leagues ===
- Bedfordshire and Hertfordshire County Girls and Women's League

=== Youth Leagues ===
- Chiltern Youth League
- Bedfordshire Youth Saturday League
- Bedfordshire Mini Soccer League
- Chiltern Junior Sevens
- Mid Beds Mini League
- Dunstable and District Lower Schools League

== Disbanded or Amalgamated Leagues ==
A number of leagues that were affiliated to the Bedfordshire County FA have disbanded or amalgamated with other leagues including:

- Bedford and District League
- Biggleswade and District League
- Dunstable and District Youth League (amalgamated with the Luton and District Youth League to become the Chiltern Youth League)
- Leighton and District League
- Luton and District League
- Luton and District Youth League (amalgamated with the Dunstable and District Youth League to become the Chiltern Youth League)
- Luton Sunday League
- South Beds Saturday League (now known as the Bedfordshire Youth Saturday League)

== Affiliated Member Clubs ==
Among the notable clubs that are affiliated to the Bedfordshire County FA are:

- AFC Dunstable
- AFC Kempston Rovers
- Ampthill Town
- Arlesey Town
- Barton Rovers
- Bedford Town
- Biggleswade
- Biggleswade Town
- Biggleswade United
- Brache Sparta Community
- Caddington
- Cranfield United
- Crawley Green Sports
- Dunstable Town
- Kent Athletic
- Langford
- Leighton Town
- Luton Old Boys
- Luton Town
- Luton Town Ladies
- Marston Shelton Rovers
- Potton United
- Real Bedford
- Real Bedford Ladies
- Shefford Town & Campton
- Stotfold
- The 61 FC (Luton)
- Totternhoe
- Wootton Blue Cross

== County Cup Competitions ==
The Bedfordshire County FA run the following Cup Competitions:

- Bedfordshire Premier Cup
- Bedfordshire Senior Challenge Cup
- Bedfordshire Senior Trophy
- Bedfordshire Intermediate Challenge Cup
- Bedfordshire Junior Challenge Cup
- Bedfordshire Sunday Cup
- Bedfordshire Sunday Junior Cup
- Bedfordshire Sunday Lower Junior Cup
- Bedfordshire Sunday Centenary Cup
- Bedfordshire Inter-League Centenary Cup
- Bedfordshire Women's Senior Cup
- Bedfordshire Under 18 Floodlit Challenge Cup
- Bedfordshire Under 18 Youth Challenge Cup
- Bedfordshire Under 16 Youth Challenge Cup
- Bedfordshire Under 15 Youth Challenge Cup
- Bedfordshire Under 14 Youth Challenge Cup
- Bedfordshire Tesco Under 13 Youth Challenge Cup
- Bedfordshire Under 12 Youth Challenge Cup
- Bedfordshire Senior Girls Development Cup
- Bedfordshire Junior Girls Development Cup
- Bedfordshire Girls Challenge Cup
- Bedfordshire Junior Challenge Trophy
