= Bedfordshire Women's Senior Cup =

Bedfordshire County FA Women's Senior Cup
- Region: Bedfordshire
- Teams: 5
- Current champions: Real Bedford Ladies F.C.
- Most championships: Real Bedford Ladies F.C. (8)
- Website: https://www.bedfordshirefa.com/county-cups

The Bedfordshire County FA Women's Senior Cup is the county cup for Women's football in Bedfordshire. According to the current rules of the competition, it is open to all clubs whose affiliation is with the Bedfordshire County FA (BCFA). The current holders are Real Bedford Ladies F.C. who won the competition when it was last contested in the 2025-2026 season in a 7-0 victory over their own reserve team in the final at McMullen Park.

== Winners ==
Season	Winners	Runners up	Ref
2013–14	Luton Town L.F.C.	Biggleswade Town	
2014–15	Bedford Ladies & Girls F.C.	Offley & Stopsley Womens	
2015–16	Luton Town L.F.C.	Offley & Stopsley Womens	
2016-17	Luton Town L.F.C.	Offley & Stopsley Womens	
2017-18	Bedford Ladies & Girls F.C.	Luton Town L.F.C.	
2018-19	Bedford Ladies & Girls F.C.	Luton Town L.F.C.	
2019-20	Cancelled due to COVID-19	Cancelled due to COVID-19	
2020-21	Bedford Ladies & Girls F.C.	A.F.C. Dunstable	
2021-22	Bedford Ladies & Girls F.C.	Biggleswade United (Ladies) Reds	
2022-23	Luton Town L.F.C.	Bedford Ladies & Girls F.C.	
2023-24	Real Bedford Ladies F.C.	A.F.C. Dunstable	
2024-25	Real Bedford Ladies F.C.	Luton Town L.F.C.	
2025-26	Real Bedford Ladies F.C.	Real Bedford Ladies & Girls F.C.	
