= 2026–27 FA Women's National League Plate =

Tournament details
- Country: England; Wales
- Dates: 1 November 2026 –
- Teams: 32

Tournament statistics
- Matches played: 16
- Goals scored: 66 (4.13 per match)
- Attendance: 1,842 (115 per match)
- Top goal scorer(s): (England) Neve Renwick (Halifax F.C.) (4 Goals)
- All statistics correct as of 8 November 2026.

The 2026–27 FA Women's National League Plate is the twelfth season of the competition, open to a ranked selection of teams eliminated from Women's National League Cup. It continues to use the same format as the previous season.

== Results ==
Games are first listed by group in chronological order, and then in alphabetical order of the home team where matches were played simultaneously.

== First Round ==
The draw for the first knockout round was made on 1 October 2026.

| 1 November 2026 | Bristol Rovers (SW1) | 1–2 | Gwalia United (SW1) | Almondsbury |
| 14:00 GMT | Preece 20' | Report | Kilburn-Thompson 5'; Ackerman 11' | Stadium: Oaklands Park Stadium; Attendance: 130; Referee: Paul Freeman |

| 1 November 2026 | Chorley (N1) | 1–4 | Manchester City U21 (PGA) | Euxton |
| 14:00 GMT | Espinoza 81' (pen.) | Report | Colbert-Martin 3'; Foster 29'; Hirons 60'; Nwankwo 90' | Stadium: Jim Fowler Memorial Ground; Attendance: 143; Referee: Aron Connolly |

| 1 November 2026 | Dulwich Hamlet (SE1) | 2–0 | Northampton Town (M1) | East Dulwich |
| 14:00 GMT | Brown 43'; Roberts 90' | Report | | Stadium: Champion Hill; Attendance: 280; Referee: Ryan Hetherington |

| 1 November 2026 | Durham Cestria (N1) | 0–3 | Derby County (N) | Shildon |
| 14:00 GMT | | Report | Stevens 24'; Green 55'; Ashton 62' | Stadium: Dean Street; Attendance: 60; Referee: Lee Hurst |

| 1 November 2026 | Halifax F.C. (N1) | 6–1 | Leafield Athletic (N) | Gainsborough |
| 14:00 GMT | Renwick 13', 19', 77', 90+2'; Crompton 24'; Limbert 54' | Report | Najib 57' | Stadium: KAL Group Stadium; Attendance: 158; Referee: Martin Barnes |

| 1 November 2026 | Kidderminster Harriers (M1) | 1–4 | Stevenage (SE1) | Droitwich |
| 14:00 GMT | Morris 72' | Report | Deane 18', 49'; Telford 60'; Wiltshire 63' | Stadium: King George V Playing Field; Attendance: 65; Referee: Teigan Clamp |

| 1 November 2026 | Lye Town (M1) | 1–0 | York City (N1) | Lye |
| 14:00 GMT | Baptiste 45+2' | Report | | Stadium: The Sports Ground; Attendance: 36; Referee: Emma Beevor |

| 1 November 2026 | Maidenhead United (SW1) | 1–6 | Lewes (S) | Maidenhead |
| 14:00 GMT | Stockton 60' | Report | Hibbert-Johnson 9'; Stephens 28'; Carpenter 36', 73'; Priest 65'; Grant 85' | Stadium: York Road; Attendance: 71; Referee: Jack Cooper |

| 1 November 2026 | Milton Keynes Dons (SE1) | 2–5 | Dartford (SE1) | Bedford |
| 14:00 GMT | Tilbury 50'; Leighton 63' | Report | Franklin 5'; Smith 7'; Lewis-Powell 14'; Awan 60'; Bromfield 66' | Stadium: The New Eyrie; Attendance: 87; Referee: Peter Kwak |

| 1 November 2026 | Notts County (M1) | 0–3 | Manchester United U21 (PGA) | Eastwood |
| 14:00 GMT | | Report | Holt 28'; Anderson 85'; Allington 89' | Stadium: Coronation Park; Attendance: 43; Referee: Wayne Mason |

| 1 November 2026 | Plymouth Argyle (S) | 0–2 | Arsenal U21 (PGA) | Plymouth |
| 14:00 GMT | | Report | Chitham 43'; Conway 82' | Stadium: Home Park; Attendance: 316; Referee: Shaun Thorne |

| 1 November 2026 | Queens Park Rangers (SE1) | 6–0 | Southampton U21 (PGA) | Hayes |
| 14:00 GMT | Leach 1', 75', 88'; Younger 18', 58'; Bell 42' | Report | | Stadium: Skyex Community Stadium; Attendance: 75; Referee: Robert Poole |

| 1 November 2026 | Sheffield United U21 (PGA) | 2–4 | Aston Villa U21 (PGA) | Sheffield |
| 14:00 GMT | Parkin 74'; King 83' (pen.) | Report | Griffths 12'; Sielaczek 54'; Badelek 68'; Aldridge 78' | Stadium: Bramall Lane; Attendance: 75; Referee: Dwayne Chappell |

| 1 November 2026 | Torquay United (SW1) | 2–0 | Luton Town (SE1) | Newton Abbot |
| 14:00 GMT | Stacey 18'; Franchi 20' | Report | | Stadium: VX3 Stadium; Attendance: 100; Referee: Olivia Oakes |

| 8 November 2026 | Huddersfield Town (N) | 2–0 | Wythenshawe F.C. (M1) | Emley |
| 14:00 GMT | Livingston 57'; Biggins 81' | Report | | Stadium: The Fantastic Media Welfare Ground; Attendance: 149; Referee: Lee Hurst |

| 8 November 2026 | Sporting Khalsa (M1) | 2–3 | Chester-le-Street Town (N1) | Willenhall |
| 14:00 GMT | Kelb 35'; Busher 76' | Report | Cowie 51'; Hockaday 88', 90+2' | Stadium: Aspray Arena; Attendance: 54; Referee: Ryan Dobson |

== Second Round ==
The draw for the second knockout round was made on 4 November 2026 at 19:00, broadcast live on the FA Women's National League YouTube channel.

| 20 December 2026 | Aston Villa U21 (PGA) | v | Manchester City U21 (PGA) |
| 14:00 GMT | | Report |

| 20 December 2026 | Dulwich Hamlet (SE1) | v | Queens Park Rangers (SE1) | East Dulwich |
| 14:00 GMT | | Report | | Stadium: Champion Hill |

| 20 December 2026 | Gwalia United (SW1) | v | Arsenal U21 (PGA) | Pontypridd |
| 14:00 GMT | | Report | | Stadium: University of South Wales Sports Park |

| 20 December 2026 | Halifax F.C. (N1) | v | Manchester United U21 (PGA) | Bradford |
| 14:00 GMT | | Report | | Stadium: Myra Shay Park |

| 20 December 2026 | Huddersfield Town (N) | v | Derby County (N) | Emley |
| 14:00 GMT | | Report | | Stadium: The Fantastic Media Welfare Ground |

| 20 December 2026 | Lewes (S) | v | Dartford (SE1) | Lewes |
| 14:00 GMT | | Report | | Stadium: The Dripping Pan |

| 20 December 2026 | Lye Town (M1) | v | Chester-le-Street Town (N1) |
| 14:00 GMT | | Report |

| 20 December 2026 | Stevenage (SE1) | v | Torquay United (SW1) | Letchworth |
| 14:00 GMT | | Report | | Stadium: Herts FA County Ground |
