= Georgia Walters =

Welsh footballer (born 1993)

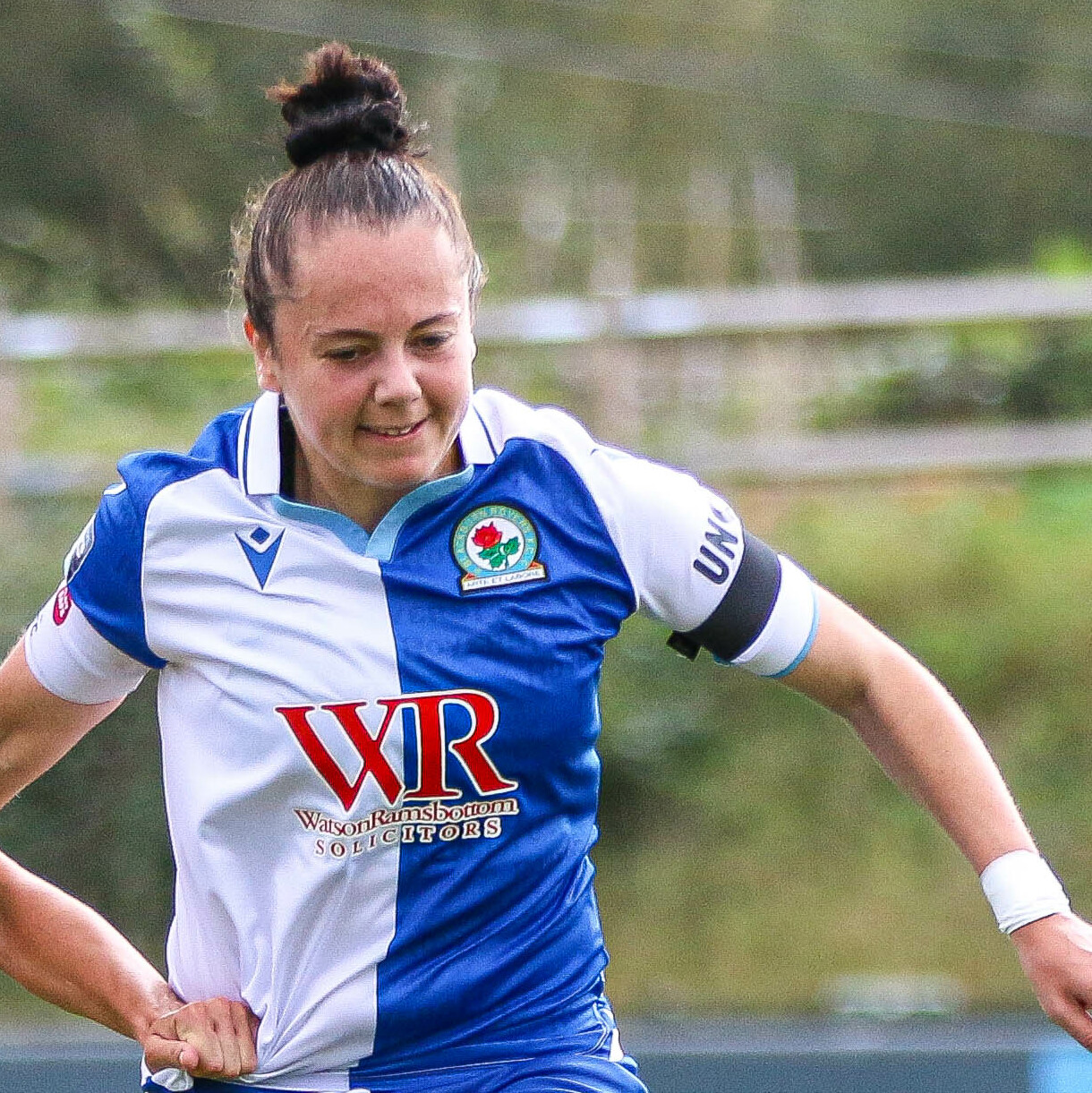
- Walters in 2023

Personal information
- Full name: Georgia Walters
- Date of birth: 6 April 1993 (age 33)
- Position: Forward

Team information
- Current team: Gwalia United F.C.

Youth career
- Swindon Town

Senior career*
Years	Team	Apps	(Gls)
- Swindon Town
c. 2015	Reading		
?–2020	Tranmere Rovers		
2020–2021	Blackburn Rovers	20	(3)
2021–2022	Liverpool	5	(0)
2022–2023	Sheffield United	26	(1)
2023–2025	Blackburn Rovers	9	(2)
2026–	Liverpool Feds	0	(0)

International career^{‡}
2020–2022	Wales	5	(0)
- * Club domestic league appearances and goals as of 09:36, 3 January 2024 (UTC) ‡ National team caps and goals as of 09:20, 18 May 2022 (UTC)

Georgia Walters (born 6 April 1993) is a Welsh footballer, who plays for Liverpool Feds and the Wales national team. She has previously played for Swindon Town, Reading, Tranmere Rovers and Liverpool.

== Club career ==
Walters has played for Swindon Town, initially at youth level, and later at senior level. In 2012, she received a scholarship to play in the US. As of 2015, she was playing for Reading, and she later played for Tranmere Rovers.

In February 2020, Walters signed for Blackburn Rovers; she made two appearances before the season was cancelled due to the COVID-19 pandemic. In July 2020, she signed a new contract with Blackburn. In total, she scored three goals in 20 league appearances for the club, and was shortlisted for the club's 2020–21 player of the season award. She left Blackburn at the end of that season, and joined Liverpool in September 2021 on a non-contract basis. In January 2022, Walters signed for Sheffield United on a contract until the end of the 2021–22 season. She played every match for Sheffield United that season, and later signed a new contract with the club prior to the 2022–23 season. Walters returned to Blackburn Rovers in August 2023, on a one-year contract.

In summer 2026, Walters joined Liverpool Feds.

== International career ==
In 2015, Walters attended a Wales national team training camp. In September 2019, Walters received her first callup to the squad. She made her debut in a 2020 match against the Faroe Islands, coming on as a substitute in the 62nd minute. In 2021, she was included in Wales squads for friendly matches against Canada and Denmark, and their October 2023 FIFA Women's World Cup qualification matches.
