= Marston Shelton Rovers F.C. =

Association football club in England

Coordinates: 52.06901°N 0.54456°W

Marston Shelton Rovers
- Full name: Marston Shelton Rovers Football Club
- Nickname: Rovers
- Founded: 1898
- Ground: Bedford Road, Marston Moretaine
- Manager: Stephen Murray
- League: Bedfordshire County League Premier Division
- 2024–25: Bedfordshire County League Premier Division, 2nd of 14
First team colours	Reserves colours

Marston Shelton Rovers Football Club is a football club based in Marston Moretaine, Bedfordshire, England. Named after the village and the adjacent hamlets of Lower Shelton and Upper Shelton, they are currently members of the Bedfordshire County League Premier Division and play at Bedford Road.

== History ==
Marston Shelton Rovers were formed in 1898. They joined the Bedford & District League and after winning Division Two in 1932–33, the club were league champions for four consecutive seasons between 1935–36 and 1938–39. In 1946 they moved up to Division One of the South Midlands League, which was renamed the Premier Division the following season. After finishing second-from-bottom of the Premier Division in 1951–52 the club were relegated to Division One. However, they were Division One runners-up in 1953–54, only missing out on the title on goal average, and were promoted back to the Premier Division.

The 1960–61 season saw Marston Shelton finish second-from-bottom of the Premier Division, resulting in relegation to Division One. They finished bottom of Division One in 1970–71, and after finishing bottom again in 1972–73, the club left the league, dropping into Division One of the Bedford & District League. They won Division One at the first attempt, and were later Division Two champions in 1977–78, before winning Division One again in 1987–88. In 2002–03 they finished fourth in Division Two, earning promotion to Division One. However, they finished bottom of Division One in 2004–05 and were relegated back to Division Two. A third-place finish in Division Two in 2009–10 saw the club promoted to Division One. They finished third in Division One in 2011–12 and were promoted to the Premier Division. In 2016–17 they won the league's Britannia Cup. The following season saw the club enter the FA Vase for the first time, losing 2–1 to Hillingdon Borough in the first qualifying round.

== Honours ==
- Bedfordshire County League
  - Champions 1935–36, 1936–37, 1937–38, 1938–39
  - Division One champions 1973–74, 1987–88
  - Division Two champions 1932–33, 1977–78
  - Britannia Cup winners 2016–17
  - Aubrey Tingey Memorial Cup winners 1976–77
- Bedfordshire Intermediate Cup
  - Winners 1962–63, 1989–90
- Bedfordshire Junior Cup
  - Winners 1935–36, 1978–79

== Records ==
- Best FA Cup performance: Preliminary round, 1950–51
- Best FA Vase performance: First qualifying round, 2017–18
