= Chesterfield F.C. Women =

English women's football club

Chesterfield Women
- Full name: Chesterfield FC Women
- Nickname: The Spireites
- Short name: CFC Women
- Founded: 2022; 4 years ago
- Ground: Debdale Sports Park
- Chairman: Ashley Kirk
- Manager: Pete Jarvis
- League: FA Women's National League Division One Midlands
- 2025–26: East Midlands Regional Women's Football League Premier Division, 1st of 10 (promoted)
- Website: chesterfield-fc.co.uk
Home colours	Away colours

Chesterfield Football Club Women is an English women's football club based in Chesterfield, Derbyshire. The club currently play in the F.A. Women's National League Division One Midlands.

== History ==
The club was formed in 2022 after a previous team of the same name affiliated with Chesterfield F.C., reverted back to their previous name of Chesterfield Ladies FC and continued as an independent team.

In their first season, they finished in second place in the Sheffield & Hallamshire Women's Football League and won promotion to the North East Regional Women's Football League.

For the 2025/26 season, Chesterfield FC Women and Chesterfield Ladies FC were both combined under the affiliation of Chesterfield F.C., the players forming a new Chesterfield FC Women's first team and development team, and also forming the basis of the Chesterfield FC Community Trust Team.

== Stadium ==
Chesterfield FC Women play their home games at Debdale Sports Park, Mansfield Woodhouse. The club also play select matches at the SMH Group Stadium.

== Players ==
=== Current squad ===
As of 27 September 2026.

Note: Flags indicate national team as defined under FIFA eligibility rules; some limited exceptions apply. Players may hold more than one non-FIFA nationality.

No.	Pos.	Nation	Player
2	DF	ENG	Alex Harding
3	DF	ENG	Abbie Staples
4	DF	ENG	Sasha Brassington
5	MF	ENG	Sophie Bain
6	MF	ENG	Tilly Hallas-Potts
7	DF	ENG	Shanelle Ashtei
8	FW	ENG	Jess Thompson
9	FW	ENG	Evie Carter
10	MF	ENG	Sophie Marshall
11	FW	SWE	Elin Morin
12	FW	ENG	Imogen Fowler
14	DF	ENG	Amy Nowell
15	FW	ENG	Jess Waplington
16	DF	ENG	Laura Porritt

No.	Pos.	Nation	Player
17	MF	ENG	Millie Standen
18	FW	BRB	Ruby Shore
19	DF	ENG	Steph Warren
20	MF	ENG	Emily Cahill
21	GK	ENG	Zoe Millington
21	GK	ENG	Rhianne Carroll
22	MF	ENG	Chloe Foster
23	FW	ENG	Lexie Butterworth
23	FW	ENG	Layla Hassen
—	GK	ENG	Ellie Flanagan (loan)
—	DF	ENG	Sophie Gordon
—	GK	ENG	Paige Johnson
—	FW	ENG	Connie Whitham
—	MF	ENG	Lauren Brogan

=== Season by season record ===
Season	Division	Level	Position	Women's FA Cup	Notes
2022–23	Sheffield & Hallamshire Women's League Division One	7	2		Promoted
2023–24	North East Regional Women's League Division One South	6	6		
2024–25	East Midlands Regional Women's League Division One North	6	5		Promoted
2025–26	East Midlands Regional Women's League Premier Divison	5	1		Promoted

== Club management ==
=== Managerial history ===
Name	Years
Andrea Parkinson	2022–25
Pete Jarvis	2025–

== Honours and achievements ==
League

- East Midlands Regional Women's League Premier Division (Level 5)
  - Champions: 2025–26

Cup

- Derbyshire Women's County Cup
  - Winners: 2025–26
