= Walton Hall Park (stadium) =

Football stadium in Liverpool, England

- Interactive map of Walton Hall Park
- Address: Liverpool Soccer Centre, Walton Hall Park, Liverpool. L4 9XP
- Location: Liverpool
- Coordinates: 53.448°N 2.952°W
- Capacity: c. 2,200 (500 seats)

Construction
- Renovated: 2019
- Architect: Condy Lofthouse Architects

Tenants
- Everton Women (2020–2025); Liverpool Feds W.F.C. (2025–present)

Walton Hall Park Stadium is a stadium in Walton Hall Park, Walton, Liverpool. It was the home ground of Everton of the Women's Super League. The first hosted Women's Super League match was against Manchester United on 23 February 2020. It ended in a 3–2 loss for Everton in front of an attendance of 893.

In June 2020, it was announced that the ground would undergo further developments to meet the requirements of the Women's Super League. It reopened in September 2021 with a new hybrid grass pitch and a capacity of 2,200.

In May 2025, Everton F.C. announced that following the move of their senior men's team to the new Hill Dickinson Stadium at Bramley-Moore Dock, the women's team would take up occupation of the former Goodison Park stadium for the 2025-26 Women's Super League season onwards. In August, Everton announced that in line with this move, Walton Hall Park would become the home ground of Liverpool Feds W.F.C.
