= Liverpool Feds W.F.C. =

English women's football club

Coordinates: 53°22′04.12″N 2°56′19.71″W

- Full name: Liverpool Feds Women's Football Club
- Nickname: Feds
- Founded: 1990
- Ground: Walton Hall Park
- Capacity: 2,200 (500 Seats)
- Chairman: Bill Stewart
- Manager: Leanne Duffy
- League: FA Women's National League North
- 2025–26: FA Women's National League North, 7th of 12
- Website: https://liverpoolfeds.com/
Home colours

Liverpool Feds Women's Football Club is an English women's association football club based in Liverpool, Merseyside. The first team currently plays in the FA Women's National League North and during the 2019–20 season the reserve team play in North West Women's Regional Football League Division One South. Since the 2025–26 season, they have played their home games at Walton Hall Park (stadium).

== History ==
The club were formed in 1990 according to the badge and originated from the Liverpool Institute of Higher Education (now known as Liverpool Hope University) where they entered the North West Women's Regional Football League (NWWRFL). The name Feds originates from the Liverpool Institute of Higher Education College origins where the sports teams played as a Federation of the St Katherine's and Christ Notre Dame Colleges. In 1993 a reserve team was added, who during the 2019–20 season are playing in the NWWRFL, and in 1994 a girls youth section was created. They play their football in the Liverpool County FA Girls Leagues. A Development Squad and an under-18s team followed shortly afterwards.

The first team won promotion from the NWWRFL into the now-defunct Northern Combination Women's Football League in 2009 when they won the 2008–09 Premier Division title without losing a single game. They ended the campaign with a record of nineteen wins and three draws from twenty-two games played. They remained in the Northern Combination until 2014 when a major restructuring of the women's football pyramid saw the Combination leagues scrapped and the teams playing at that level moved into the new FA Women's Premier League (now known as the FA Women's National League) Division One, which was divided into four regional sections.

In the summer of 2015 Liverpool Feds linked up with the men's club Marshalls F.C. and changed their name to Liverpool Marshall Feds. This alliance lasted for three years, but in 2018 the women's club opted to break away and the word Marshall was dropped from the name of the club, reverting to their original name.

== Colours ==
The club's colours are blue and navy.

== Ground ==
From 2018 to 2025, Liverpool Feds played their home games at the Jericho Lane Football Hub in Aigburth, having moved there from their previous home at the I M Marsh Campus of Liverpool John Moores University. The Jericho Lane site, which they shared with South Liverpool F.C., was jointly developed by Liverpool City Council, the Liverpool County Football Association and The Football Association. The ground has a capacity for one thousand people.

On 26 August 2025, Feds announced they would be moving to Walton Hall Park, the former home of the Everton F.C. women's squad, who relocated to Goodison Park beginning with the 2025–26 season.

== Current squad ==
As of 25 August 2026

Note: Flags indicate national team as defined under FIFA eligibility rules; some limited exceptions apply. Players may hold more than one non-FIFA nationality.

No.	Pos.	Nation	Player
1	GK	IRL	Naoisha McAloon
2	DF	ENG	Erin Caldecott
3	DF	ENG	Evie Smith
4	DF	WAL	Seren Carrington
5	MF	ENG	Chantelle Thompson (captain)
6	DF	ENG	Hannah Fryer
7	FW	WAL	Georgia Walters
8	MF	ENG	Maddy Duffy
9	FW		Henna Butcher

No.	Pos.	Nation	Player
10	MF	ENG	Jess Brady
12	MF	ENG	Faye Coulthard
14	MF	ENG	Holly McEvoy
16	DF	ENG	Iszy Binks
17	MF	ENG	Sophie Andrews
18	DF	ENG	Emma Johnson
19	DF	ENG	Emily Loudon
20	FW	USA	Maddie Bouggess
22	GK	ENG	Maddy Dermott
