= York City Ladies F.C. =

Women's football club from York, England

York City
- Full name: York City Ladies Football Club
- Nickname: The Minsterbelles
- Founded: 1995; 31 years ago
- Ground: University of York Sports Centre
- Owner: York City Football Club
- Chairman: Paula Stainton
- Manager: Chris Hames
- League: FA Women's National League Division One North
- 2025–26: FA Women's National League Division One North, 10th of 12
- Website: https://www.yorkcityfootballclub.co.uk/teams/ladies
| Home colours | Away colours |

York City Ladies Football Club is an English women's football club based in York, England. Founded in 1995, they currently play in the FA Women's National League Division One North.

== History ==
York City Ladies Football Club was founded in 1995. The club won the 2005–06 North East Regional Southern Division, and were promoted to the Premier Division. In July 2020 Chris Hamilton was appointed manager. York won the 2021–22 North East Regional Premier Division, and were promoted to the FA National League Division One North. In June 2022 Steph Fairless was appointed manager. On 22 February 2024, Chris Holloway was announced as manager, with Steph Turnbull becoming the club's Female Pathway Technical Director. Emily Senior was announced as manager on 9 October 2024.

== Stadium ==
York play their home games at the University of York Sports Centre. Since 2022 the club can also play home games at York Community Stadium.

== Management and staff ==
=== Current staff ===
| Position | Name |
|---|---|
| Chairperson | (England) Paula Stainton |
| Post 16 Female Pathway Director | (England) Bobby Paterson |
| First-team manager | (England) Chris Hames |

=== Managerial history ===
| Dates | Name |
|---|---|
| 2020–2022 | (Scotland) Chris Hamilton |
| 2022–2024 | (England) Steph Fairless |
| 2024 | (England) Chris Holloway |
| 2024 - 2025 | (England) Emily Senior |
| 2025 | (Scotland) Bobby Patterson |
| 2025 - June 2026 | (England) Dan Jackson |
| 2026 - Present | (England) Chris Hames |

== Honours ==
=== League ===
- North East Regional Premier Division (level 5)
  - Champions: 2021–22
- North East Regional Southern Division (level 6)
  - Champions: 2005–06

== Seasons ==
| Champions | Runners-up | Relegated |

| Season | League | | | | | | | | | FA Cup | National League Cup | National League Plate |
| Season | Division | Pld | W | D | L | GF | GA | Pts | Pos | FA Cup | National League Cup | National League Plate |
|---|---|---|---|---|---|---|---|---|---|---|---|---|
| 2010–11 | North East Premier | 20 | 6 | 2 | 12 | 47 | 61 | 20 | 9th | — | — | — |
| 2011–12 | North East Premier | 22 | 10 | 6 | 6 | 53 | 43 | 33 | 6th | — | — | — |
| 2012–13 | North East Premier | 20 | 9 | 1 | 10 | 64 | 58 | 28 | 5th | — | — | — |
| 2013–14 | North East Premier | 20 | 12 | 1 | 7 | 74 | 34 | 37 | 5th | — | — | — |
| 2014–15 | North East Premier | 18 | 12 | 1 | 5 | 61 | 38 | 37 | 4th | Q2 | — | — |
| 2015–16 | North East Premier | 22 | 15 | 2 | 5 | 96 | 39 | 47 | 3rd | Q2 | — | — |
| 2016–17 | North East Premier | 20 | 9 | 1 | 10 | 57 | 58 | 25 | 6th | — | — | — |
| 2017–18 | North East Premier | 16 | 6 | 1 | 9 | 48 | 37 | 16 | 6th | — | — | — |
| 2018–19 | North East Premier | 18 | 6 | 1 | 11 | 49 | 71 | 19 | 7th | — | — | — |
| 2019–20 | North East Premier (Note: Cancelled as a result of the COVID-19 pandemic.) | 11 | 0 | 2 | 9 | 10 | 46 | 2 | 8th | — | — | — |
| 2020–21 | North East Premier | 5 | 3 | 2 | 0 | 17 | 9 | 11 | 2nd | Q1 | — | — |
| 2021–22 | North East Premier | 20 | 17 | 2 | 1 | 105 | 26 | 53 | 1st | Q3 | — | — |
| 2022–23 | FAWNL Division One North | 22 | 6 | 3 | 13 | 32 | 46 | 21 | 9th | R1 | R1 | — |
| 2023–24 | FAWNL Division One North | 22 | 4 | 5 | 13 | 31 | 44 | 17 | 10th | R1 | DR | R2 |
| 2024-25 | FAWNL Division One North | 22 | 6 | 3 | 13 | 29 | 54 | 21 | 10th | R1 | - | - |
