= Peterborough United F.C. Women =

Association football club in England

Peterborough United Women
- Full name: Peterborough United Football Club Women
- Nickname: The Posh
- Founded: 1991; 35 years ago (as Peterborough Pythons)
- Ground: PIMS Park, Peterborough
- Capacity: 2,300
- Manager: Jake Poole
- League: FA Women's National League North
- 2025–26: FA Women's National League Division One Midlands, 1st of 12 (promoted)
- Website: theposh.com
Home colours	Away colours	Third colours

Peterborough United Football Club Women is a professional association football club based in Peterborough, Cambridgeshire, England. They are nicknamed "The Posh". The team competes in FA Women's National League North, the third tier of English women's football.

== History ==
The team was originally founded in the early 1990s as Peterborough Pythons and enjoyed many successes locally, including promotion to the East Midlands Premier Division and winning the Cambridgeshire County Plate in the 1997–98 season. Peterborough Pythons also saw some triumph on the national stage, reaching the third round of the Women's FA Cup in 1999–2000. By this stage, the club had begun affiliation with Peterborough United, and used the same name. The club then folded during the 2000s.

In 2014, the club was re-founded by Women & Girls Development Officer Jenna Lusk, and were affiliated to the Peterborough United Foundation. It was not until 2021 that the club once again became affiliated to Peterborough United Football Club. Following two cancelled seasons due to the COVID-19 pandemic, the Posh were promoted to the FA Women's National League Division 1 Midlands for the 2021–22 season. After a difficult first season in the fourth tier, the Posh secured a 4th place finish in 2022–23, as well as winning the Northamptonshire County Cup. League success occurred again in 2025–26, with Peterborough United going unbeaten across the league season, winning the Division One Midlands title and securing promotion to the third tier for the first time in their history.

== Stadium ==
Peterborough United Women have had multiple different home stadiums, starting with Nene Park Academy, the same location as the training facility.

The club then moved to Abbey Lawn, the home of Bourne Town in 2022 as attendances and the popularity of women's football began to increase. The Haydon Whitham Stadium, home of Deeping Rangers was also used when there were fixture clashes or renovation works at Abbey Lawn.

Peterborough United returned to the city in 2025, announcing a groundshare with Peterborough Sports to play at PIMS Park. The 2025–26 season also included a one-off match at London Road Stadium.

== Players ==
=== Current squad ===
As of 17 May 2026

Note: Flags indicate national team as defined under FIFA eligibility rules; some limited exceptions apply. Players may hold more than one non-FIFA nationality.

No.	Pos.	Nation	Player
3	DF	SCO	Niamh Connor
4	MF	ENG	Kayleigh Hines
5	DF	ENG	Evie Driscoll-King
6	DF	ENG	Emily Sharpe
7	FW	ENG	Jess Rousseau
8	MF	ENG	Poppie Brown
9	FW	ENG	Keir Perkins (captain)
11	MF	ENG	Megan Lawlor
12	MF	IRL	Niamh Reynolds
13	GK	ENG	Neive Corry

No.	Pos.	Nation	Player
14	MF	ENG	Jessica Stanford
15	MF	ENG	Kira Rai
16	DF	USA	Anna Pitt
17	MF	ENG	Lauren Wilshaw
18	MF	ENG	Courtney Clarke
21	DF	ENG	Hayley James
22	DF	ENG	Edyn Osker
28	FW	ENG	Taya Smith
29	MF	ENG	Rebecca Mears
33	GK	ENG	Sophie Harris

== Honours ==
League

- FA Women's National League:
  - Division One Midlands Champions: 2025–26
- East Midlands Women's Regional Football League:
  - Division One South Champions: 2017–18

Cup

- Northamptonshire FA County Cup: 2018–19, 2022–23
