= Real Bedford Ladies F.C. =

Women's football club

Real Bedford L.F.C.
- Nickname: The Pirates
- Founded: 1996
- Ground: Ledger Stadium, McMullen Park
- Chairperson: Jill Upton
- Manager: Charlie Bill
- League: FA Women's National League South
- 2025–26: FA Women's National League South, 6th of 12
- Website: http://www.realbedford.com

Real Bedford Ladies F.C are a football club who play in the FA Women's National League. They play their home games at McMullen Park in Bedford and are nicknamed The Pirates. They won back-to-back promotions in 2023‍–‍24 and 2024‍–‍25 to reach the third tier of English women's football. After many years of independence under the name Bedford Ladies and Girls F.C, they have been associated with men's team Real Bedford F.C. since 2022.

== History ==
They were founded as Bedford Ladies and Girls F.C in 1996. They played their home games at Allen Park before moving to McMullan Park. In 2014 they reached the FA Women's Premier League Division One.

In June 2022 it was announced that Bedford Ladies and Girls would go into partnership with men's team Real Bedford F.C.

Dean Perrett was appointed as manager for the 2023‍–‍24 season, however he left his role in November by mutual consent. Georgia Clarke was then announced as interim manager. Real Bedford Ladies reached the first round proper of the Women's FA Cup, losing to Billericay Town 0‍–‍2, and won promotion from the Eastern Regional League Premier Division, ending an eight year spell outside the FA Women's National League. Real Bedford Ladies secured a treble by defeating AFC Dunstable Ladies 5‍–‍0 in the County Cup and Wroxham Ladies 4‍–‍2 in the League Cup.

Charlie Bill was unveiled as the new permanent manager, and Real Bedford Ladies won promotion from the FA Women's National League Division One South East at the first attempt in the 2024‍–‍25 season, to reach the third tier of women's football. They clinched the title with an 11‍–‍1 victory over London Seaward. It marked a double success for Real Bedford as the men's team also won promotion from their league that season. Real Bedford Ladies also won the County Cup, beating Luton Town 5‍–‍0 in the final at Kenilworth Road.

== Current squad ==
As of 14 Aug 2026

Note: Flags indicate national team as defined under FIFA eligibility rules; some limited exceptions apply. Players may hold more than one non-FIFA nationality.

| No. | Pos. | Nation | Player |
|---|---|---|---|
| 1 | GK | ENG | Erica Meale |
| TBC | DF | ENG | Hannah Warren |
| TBC | DF | ENG | Nicola Puddick |
| TBC | DF | ENG | Daisy Hind |
| TBC | DF | ENG | Bea Cunnison |
| TBC | DF | GHA | Blue Bartlett-Antwi |
| TBC | MF | ENG | Amber Gaylor |
| TBC | MF | ENG | Dre Georgiou |
| TBC | MF | ENG | Lucy Wood |

| No. | Pos. | Nation | Player |
|---|---|---|---|
| TBC | MF | ENG | Melis Mehmet |
| TBC | MF | ENG | Faye Fields-Davis |
| TBC | MF | ENG | Sophie Mclean |
| TBC | FW | ENG | Lily Whitelock |
| TBC | FW | ENG | Leyla O'Brien |
| TBC | FW | ENG | Sophie Byrom |
| TBC | FW | ENG | Mylee Baker |
| TBC | FW | WAL | Zynia Delglyn |
| TBC | FW | ENG | Ellie Head |

== Honours ==
League

- FA Women's National League Division One South East (level 4)
  - Winners 2024‍–‍25
- Eastern Region Women's Football League Premier Division (level 5)
  - Winners 2013‍–‍14, 2023‍–‍24
- Eastern Region Women's Football League Division 1 West (level 6)
  - Winners 2006‍–‍07

Cup

- Eastern Region League Cup
  - Winners 2023‍–‍24
- Bedfordshire Women's Senior Cup
  - Winners 2014–15; 2017-18; 2018-19; 2020-21; 2021-22; 2023-24; 2024-25; 2025-26
