= 2019–20 Brighton & Hove Albion W.F.C. season =

Brighton & Hove Albion
2019–20 season
- Chairman: Tony Bloom
- Manager: Hope Powell
- Stadium: Broadfield Stadium, Crawley
- WSL: 9th
- FA Cup: Quarter-final
- League Cup: Quarter-final
- Top goalscorer: League: Aileen Whelan (5); All: Kayleigh Green, Ini Umotong and Aileen Whelan (6)
- Highest home attendance: 4,130 (vs. Birmingham City, 17 November)
- Lowest home attendance: 510 (vs. Reading, 29 November)
- Average home league attendance: 1,311
Home colours	Away colours	Third colours

The 2019–20 Brighton & Hove Albion W.F.C. season was the club's 29th season in existence and their second in the FA Women's Super League, the highest level of the football pyramid. Along with competing in the WSL, the club also contested two domestic cup competitions: the FA Cup and the League Cup.

On 13 March 2020, in line with the FA's response to the coronavirus pandemic, it was announced the season was temporarily suspended until at least 3 April 2020. After further postponements, the season was ultimately ended prematurely on 25 May 2020 with immediate effect. Brighton sat in 9th at the time and retained their position on sporting merit after The FA Board's decision to award places on a points-per-game basis.

== Squad ==
As of 23 January 2020.

Note: Flags indicate national team as defined under FIFA eligibility rules; some limited exceptions apply. Players may hold more than one non-FIFA nationality.

No.	Pos.	Nation	Player
1	GK	ENG	Megan Walsh
2	DF	ENG	Beth Roe
3	DF	ENG	Felicity Gibbons
4	MF	ENG	Danielle Bowman (captain)
5	DF	ENG	Fern Whelan
6	DF	NIR	Laura Rafferty
7	FW	ENG	Aileen Whelan
8	MF	ENG	Kirsty Barton
9	FW	NGA	Ini Umotong
10	MF	ENG	Kate Natkiel
11	MF	SWE	Amanda Nildén
12	DF	DEN	Matilde Lundorf
14	DF	NED	Danique Kerkdijk
15	FW	WAL	Kayleigh Green

No.	Pos.	Nation	Player
16	FW	ENG	Ellie Brazil
17	MF	IRL	Megan Connolly
18	MF	ENG	Jodie Brett
19	MF	ENG	Emily Simpkins
20	DF	ENG	Victoria Williams
21	DF	ENG	Maya Le Tissier
22	GK	ENG	Laura Hartley
23	FW	IRL	Rianna Jarrett
24	FW	NED	Maxime Bennink (on loan from Reading)
25	GK	NOR	Cecilie Fiskerstrand
26	MF	ENG	Libby Bance
27	MF	FRA	Léa Le Garrec
28	DF	ENG	Ellie Hack

== Management team ==
Position	Name
Manager	Hope Powell
Assistant manager	Amy Merricks
Goalkeeping coach	Alex Penny
General Manager	Kirsty Hulland
Strength & Conditioning Coach	Ivo Nunez Miguel
Physiotherapist	Lisa Walsh
Lead Analysis	Edward Filmer
Club Doctor	Dr. Timothy Buck
Kit Manager	Maurice Bane

== Pre-season ==
21 July 2019 Friendly	Brighton & Hove Albion	5–1	Crystal Palace	Behind closed doors
	Barton 1'; A. Whelan 39', 50'; Umotong 52' (pen.); Natkiel 62'	Report	Unnamed 59'

16 August 2019 Friendly	Valencia (Spain)	0–1	Brighton & Hove Albion	Torrevieja, Spain
		Report	Umotong 52'	Stadium: Estadio Municipal Vicente García

== FA Women's Super League ==
=== Results summary ===
Overall								Home						Away					
Pld	W	D	L	GF	GA	GD	Pts	W	D	L	GF	GA	GD	W	D	L	GF	GA	GD
16	3	4	9	11	30	−19	13	3	3	3	10	12	−2	0	1	6	1	18	−17

Last updated: 23 February 2020.
Source: FA WSL

=== Results by matchday ===
Round	1	2	3	4	5	6	7	8	9	10	11	12	13	14	15	16	17	18	19	20	21	22
Ground	A	H	A	H	A	H	A	H	A	A	H	H	A	H	H	H	A	H	A	A	H	A
Result	D	D	L	L	L	W	L	D	L	L	W	L	L	W	D	L	C	C	C	C	C	C
Position	6	8	9	9	11	9	9	9	10	10	9	9	9	9	9	9						

A = Away; H = Home; W = Win; D = Draw; L = Loss

=== Results ===
7 September 2019 1	Bristol City	0–0	Brighton & Hove Albion	Bristol
15:00	Daniëls (yellow card) 40'	Report	Lundorf (yellow card) 86'	Stadium: Ashton Gate; Attendance: 3,041; Referee: Abigail Bryne

15 September 2019 2	Brighton & Hove Albion	1–1	Chelsea	Crawley
14:00	Bowman (yellow card) 50'; A. Whelan 84'	Report	Bright (yellow card) 86'; Engman 90+1'	Stadium: Broadfield Stadium; Attendance: 1,352; Referee: Lee Collins

29 September 2019 3	Arsenal	4–0	Brighton & Hove Albion	Borehamwood
12:30	Little 9'; Miedema 39'; van de Donk 56'; Nobbs 70'	Report	Lundorf (yellow card) 72'; Nildén (yellow card) 88'	Stadium: Meadow Park; Attendance: 1,607; Referee: Elliot Swallow

13 October 2019 4	Brighton & Hove Albion	1–3	West Ham United	Crawley
14:00	Le Garrec (yellow card) 63'; Lundorf (yellow card) 66'; Green (yellow card) 90'; Connolly 90+2'	Report	Vetterlein (yellow card) 20'; Thomas 24'; Dali 70' (pen.); Lehmann 73', (yellow card) 90+1'	Stadium: Broadfield Stadium; Attendance: 849; Referee: Lisa Benn

27 October 2019 5	Everton	2–0	Brighton & Hove Albion	Southport
	Clémaron (yellow card) 25'; Kelly 58'; Morgan 68'	Report	Bowman (yellow card) 80'	Stadium: Haig Avenue; Attendance: 331; Referee: Jane Simms

17 November 2019 6	Brighton & Hove Albion	3–0	Birmingham City	Falmer
14:00	Green 15' (pen.), 71'; Le Garrec 44'	Report		Stadium: Amex Stadium; Attendance: 4,130; Referee: Helen Conley

24 November 2019 7	Manchester United	4–0	Brighton & Hove Albion	Leigh
12:00	James 10'; Galton 29', 67'; McManus (yellow card) 61'; Zelem 87' (pen.)	Report	Bowman (yellow card) 47'; A. Whelan (yellow card) 69'	Stadium: Leigh Sports Village; Attendance: 1,707; Referee: Steven Copeland

29 November 2019 8	Brighton & Hove Albion	2–2	Reading	Crawley
19:45	A. Whelan 18'; Umotong 34'	Report	Williams 15'; Eikeland (yellow card) 43'; Allen 90+5'	Stadium: Broadfield Stadium; Attendance: 510; Referee: Matthew Russell

8 December 2019 9	Tottenham Hotspur	1–0	Brighton & Hove Albion	Canons Park
14:00	Williams 57' (o.g.); Leon (yellow card) 77'; Peplow (yellow card) 82'	Report		Stadium: The Hive Stadium; Attendance: 571; Referee: Emily Heaslip

15 December 2019 10	Manchester City	5–0	Brighton & Hove Albion	Manchester
14:00	Houghton 3'; White 14'; Hemp 38'; Stanway 79'; Bremer 86'	Report	A. Whelan (yellow card) 43'	Stadium: Academy Stadium; Attendance: 1,173; Referee: Lucy Oliver

5 January 2020 11	Brighton & Hove Albion	1–0	Liverpool	Crawley
14:00	A. Whelan 33'; Kerkdijk (yellow card) 55'; Green (yellow card) 72'	Report	Fahey (yellow card) 82'; Robe (yellow card) 90+5'	Stadium: Broadfield Stadium; Attendance: 947; Referee: Amy Fearn

12 January 2020 12	Brighton & Hove Albion	0–4	Arsenal	Crawley
14:00		Report	van de Donk 3'; Roord 31', (yellow card) 44'; Nobbs 51'; Mead 89'	Stadium: Broadfield Stadium; Attendance: 1,312; Referee: Kirsty Dowle

19 January 2020 13	West Ham United	2–1	Brighton & Hove Albion	Romford
15:00	Kiernan (yellow card) 50'; Lehmann 79', 83'	Report	Kerkdijk 23', (yellow card) 63'; Barton (yellow card) 51'	Stadium: Rush Green Stadium; Attendance: 1,799; Referee: Ryan Atkin

2 February 2020 14	Brighton & Hove Albion	1–0	Everton	Crawley
14:00	A. Whelan 39'; Umotong (yellow card) 63'; Barton (yellow card) 75'; Green (yellow card) 82'; Gibbons (yellow card) 87'	Report	Stringer (yellow card) 38'; Cain (yellow card) 90+4'	Stadium: Broadfield Stadium; Attendance: 830; Referee: Abigail Byrne

9 February 2020	Birmingham City	P–P	Brighton & Hove Albion	Solihull
14:00				Stadium: Damson Park
Note: All WSL games postponed due to adverse weather conditions

12 February 2020 15	Brighton & Hove Albion	1–1	Manchester United	Crawley
19:45	A. Whelan 45'	Report	Walsh 1' (o.g.)	Stadium: Broadfield Stadium; Attendance: 903; Referee: Savvas Yianni

23 February 2020 16	Brighton & Hove Albion	0–1	Tottenham Hotspur	Crawley
14:00	Kerkdijk (yellow card) 16'; Le Garrec (yellow card) 25' (yellow-red card) 32'; Bowman (yellow card) 85'	Report	Dean 66' (pen.)	Stadium: Broadfield Stadium; Attendance: 964; Referee: Louise Saunders

22 March 2020 17	Reading	Cancelled	Brighton & Hove Albion	High Wycombe
14:00				Stadium: Adams Park
Note: Cancelled due to coronavirus pandemic

29 March 2020 18	Brighton & Hove Albion	Cancelled	Bristol City	Crawley
14:00				Stadium: Broadfield Stadium
Note: Cancelled due to coronavirus pandemic

5 April 2020 19	Chelsea	Cancelled	Brighton & Hove Albion	Kingston upon Thames
14:00				Stadium: Kingsmeadow
Note: Cancelled due to coronavirus pandemic

26 April 2020 20	Liverpool	Cancelled	Brighton & Hove Albion	Birkenhead
12:00				Stadium: Prenton Park
Note: Cancelled due to coronavirus pandemic

16 May 2020 21	Brighton & Hove Albion	Cancelled	Manchester City	Crawley
				Stadium: Broadfield Stadium
Note: Cancelled due to coronavirus pandemic

22	Birmingham City	Cancelled	Brighton & Hove Albion	Solihull
				Stadium: Damson Park
Note: Rescheduled from 9 February 2020. Cancelled due to coronavirus pandemic

=== League table ===
Pos	Team	Pld	W	D	L	GF	GA	GD	Pts	PPG
7	Tottenham Hotspur	15	6	2	7	15	24	−9	20	1.33
8	West Ham United	14	5	1	8	19	34	−15	16	1.14
9	Brighton & Hove Albion	16	3	4	9	11	30	−19	13	0.81
10	Bristol City	14	2	3	9	9	38	−29	9	0.64
11	Birmingham City	13	2	1	10	5	23	−18	7	0.54

Source: FA WSL, BBC
Rules for classification: Initially: 1) Points; 2) Goal difference; 3) Number of goals scored. After abandonment of season: 1) Points per game

== Women's FA Cup ==
As a member of the top two tiers, Brighton & Hove Albion entered the FA Cup in the fourth round, beating Championship teams Aston Villa and Crystal Palace in the fourth and fifth rounds respectively. A quarter-final against fellow WSL opposition Birmingham City was postponed due to the coronavirus pandemic before the season was ultimately curtailed. On 24 July 2020 it was announced the 2019–20 FA Cup would resume play during the 2020–21 season starting with the quarter-final ties rescheduled for the weekend of 26/27 September 2020.

26 January 2020 Fourth round	Aston Villa	2–3	Brighton & Hove Albion	Boldmere
	Hayles 14', 81'	Report	Umotong 11' (pen.); A. Whelan 30'; Nildén 35'	Stadium: Trevor Brown Memorial Ground

25 February 2020 Fifth round	Crystal Palace	0–3	Brighton & Hove Albion	Bromley
19:30		Report	Jarrett 14', 46'; Umotong 69'	Stadium: Hayes Lane

15 March 2020 Quarter-final	Brighton & Hove Albion	P–P	Birmingham City	Crawley
				Stadium: Broadfield Stadium
Note: Postponed due to coronavirus pandemic

27 September 2020 Quarter-final	Brighton & Hove Albion	2–2 (2–4 p)	Birmingham City	Crawley
14:00	Simpkins (yellow card) 21'; Bowman 25' (pen.); A. Whelan (yellow card) 58'; O'Sullivan 89'; K. Green (yellow card) 90+4'	Report	Mayling 5', (yellow card) 37'; M. Green 52' (pen.); Brougham (yellow card) 90+4'	Stadium: Broadfield Stadium; Attendance: Behind-closed-doors; Referee: Rebecca Welch
	Penalties
	K. Green (penalty missed); Le Tissier (penalty scored); Jarrett (penalty scored); Connolly (penalty missed)		(penalty scored) M. Green; (penalty missed) Walker; (penalty scored) Murray; (penalty scored) Mayling; (penalty scored) Brougham
Note: Rescheduled from 15 March 2020

== FA Women's League Cup ==
=== Group stage ===
22 September 2019 Group stage	Charlton Athletic	0–3	Brighton & Hove Albion	Bexley
14:00		Report	Le Tissier (yellow card) 12'; Umotong 44'; Green 66' (pen.), 88' (pen.); Kerkdijk (yellow card) 73'	Stadium: The Oakwood

20 October 2019 Group stage	Brighton & Hove Albion	1–2	Bristol City	Crawley
14:00	Green 60' (pen.)	Report	Harrison 9'; Salmon 45+2'	Stadium: Broadfield Stadium

3 November 2019 Group stage	Brighton & Hove Albion	0–0 (4–2 p)	Arsenal	Crawley
14:00	Barton (yellow card) 52'	Report		Stadium: Broadfield Stadium; Attendance: 761; Referee: Paul Howard
	Penalties
	Barton (penalty missed); Green (penalty scored); Le Tissier (penalty scored); Bowman (penalty scored); Le Garrec (penalty scored)		(penalty missed) Little; (penalty scored) McCabe; (penalty missed) Mead; (penalty scored) van de Donk

20 November 2019 Group stage	London Bees	0–5	Brighton & Hove Albion	Canons Park
19:45		Report	A. Whelan (yellow card) 39'; Nildén 43'; Williams 50'; Simpkins 60'; Umotong 70'; Natkiel 87'	Stadium: The Hive Stadium; Attendance: 152; Referee: Stacey Pearson

11 December 2019 Group stage	London City Lionesses	2–4	Brighton & Hove Albion	Dartford
19:30	Clarke 47' (pen.); Mason 89'	Report	Lundorf 18'; Umotong 57'; Bennett 68' (o.g.); Simpkins 79'	Stadium: Princes Park; Attendance: 43; Referee: Abigail Byrne

Pos	Team	Pld	W	WPEN	LPEN	L	GF	GA	GD	Pts	Qualification	ARS	BHA	BRI	LON	CHA	LCL
1	Arsenal	5	4	0	1	0	25	0	+25	13	Advance to Knock-out stage	—	—	7–0	9–0	4–0	—
2	Brighton & Hove Albion	5	3	1	0	1	13	4	+9	11	Advance to Knock-out stage	0–0	—	1–2	—	—	—
3	Bristol City	5	3	0	1	1	11	11	0	10		—	—	—	3–0	—	1–1
4	London Bees	5	1	1	0	3	3	17	−14	5		—	0–5	—	—	0–0	—
5	Charlton Athletic	5	1	0	1	3	3	12	−9	4		—	0–3	2–5	—	—	1–0
6	London City Lionesses	5	0	1	0	4	3	14	−11	2		0–5	2–4	—	0–3	—	—

Source: playmakerstats.com
Rules for classification: 1) Points; 2) Goal difference; 3) Number of goals scored; 4) Number of wins; 5) Head-to-head record

=== Knockout phase ===
15 January 2020 Quarter-final	Manchester United	2–1	Brighton & Hove Albion	Leigh
19:30	McManus 13'; Ladd (yellow card) 50'; James (yellow card) 73'; Ross 75'	Report	Simpkins (yellow card) 57'; Green 83' (pen.)	Stadium: Leigh Sports Village; Attendance: 642; Referee: Martin Woods

== Squad statistics ==
=== Appearances ===
Starting appearances are listed first, followed by substitute appearances after the + symbol where applicable.

No.	Pos	Nat	Player	Total		FA WSL		FA Cup		League Cup	
No.	Pos	Nat	Player	Apps	Goals	Apps	Goals	Apps	Goals	Apps	Goals
1	GK	(England) ENG	Megan Walsh	16	0	15	0	1	0	0	0
2	DF	(England) ENG	Beth Roe	3	0	0	0	2	0	0+1	0
3	DF	(England) ENG	Felicity Gibbons	23	0	15	0	1+1	0	5+1	0
4	MF	(England) ENG	Danielle Bowman	21	1	16	0	1	1	2+2	0
5	DF	(England) ENG	Fern Whelan	4	0	3	0	0	0	1	0
6	DF	(Northern Ireland) NIR	Laura Rafferty	0	0	0	0	0	0	0	0
7	FW	(England) ENG	Aileen Whelan	23	6	16	5	3	1	4	0
8	MF	(England) ENG	Kirsty Barton	13	0	10	0	0	0	3	0
9	FW	(Nigeria) NGA	Ini Umotong	22	6	6+8	1	2	2	5+1	3
10	MF	(England) ENG	Kate Natkiel	15	1	4+3	0	2	0	5+1	1
11	MF	(Sweden) SWE	Amanda Nildén	16	2	5+5	0	1	1	5	1
12	DF	(Denmark) DEN	Matilde Lundorf	13	1	6+2	0	2	0	3	1
14	DF	(Netherlands) NED	Danique Kerkdijk	23	1	13+1	1	3	0	6	0
15	FW	(Wales) WAL	Kayleigh Green	23	6	14+2	2	0+3	0	2+2	4
16	FW	(England) ENG	Ellie Brazil	8	0	6	0	0	0	2	0
17	MF	(Republic of Ireland) IRL	Megan Connolly	12	1	6+3	1	1+1	0	1	0
18	MF	(England) ENG	Jodie Brett	0	0	0	0	0	0	0	0
19	MF	(England) ENG	Emily Simpkins	19	2	8+2	0	3	0	5+1	2
20	DF	(England) ENG	Victoria Williams	16	1	11+1	0	1	0	2+1	1
21	DF	(England) ENG	Maya Le Tissier	19	0	7+5	0	3	0	4	0
22	GK	(England) ENG	Laura Hartley	0	0	0	0	0	0	0	0
23	FW	(Republic of Ireland) IRL	Rianna Jarrett	2	2	0	0	1+1	2	0	0
24	FW	(Netherlands) NED	Maxime Bennick	2	0	0	0	1+1	0	0	0
25	GK	(Norway) NOR	Cecilie Fiskerstrand	3	0	0	0	2	0	1	0
26	MF	(England) ENG	Libby Bance	2	0	0	0	0	0	2	0
27	MF	(France) FRA	Léa Le Garrec	18	1	14+1	1	0	0	2+1	0
28	DF	(England) ENG	Ellie Hack	1	0	0	0	0	0	1	0
		(England) ENG	Faith Nokuthula	1	0	0	0	0+1	0	0	0
Joined during 2020–21 season but competed in the postponed 2019–20 FA Cup:
9	FW	(South Korea) KOR	Lee Geum-min	1	0	0	0	1	0	0	0
10	MF	(Netherlands) NED	Inessa Kaagman	1	0	0	0	0+1	0	0	0
11	MF	(Finland) FIN	Nora Heroum	1	0	0	0	1	0	0	0
12	FW	(Republic of Ireland) IRL	Denise O'Sullivan	1	1	0	0	0+1	1	0	0
13	DF	(New Zealand) NZL	Rebekah Stott	1	0	0	0	1	0	0	0
Players away from the club on loan:
13	GK	(England) ENG	Sophie Harris	6	0	1	0	0	0	5	0

=== Goalscorers ===
Rank	No.	Pos.	Name	FA WSL	FA Cup	League Cup	Total
1	7	FW	(England) Aileen Whelan	5	1	0	6
1	9	FW	(Nigeria) Ini Umotong	1	2	3	6
1	15	FW	(Wales) Kayleigh Green	2	0	4	6
4	11	MF	(Sweden) Amanda Nildén	0	1	1	2
4	19	MF	(England) Emily Simpkins	0	0	2	2
4	23	FW	(Republic of Ireland) Rianna Jarrett	0	2	0	2
7	4	MF	(England) Danielle Bowman	0	1	0	1
7	10	MF	(England) Kate Natkiel	0	0	1	1
7	12	DF	(Denmark) Matilde Lundorf	0	0	1	1
7	12	FW	(Republic of Ireland) Denise O'Sullivan (Note: Joined during 2020–21 season but scored in the postponed 2019–20 FA Cup)	0	1	0	1
7	14	DF	(Netherlands) Danique Kerkdijk	1	0	0	1
7	17	MF	(Republic of Ireland) Megan Connolly	1	0	0	1
7	20	DF	(England) Victoria Williams	0	0	1	1
7	27	MF	(France) Léa Le Garrec	1	0	0	1
Own goal				0	0	1	1
Total				11	8	14	33

== Transfers ==
=== Transfers in ===
Date	Position	Nationality	Name	From	Ref.
1 July 2019	DF	(Netherlands)	Danique Kerkdijk	(England) Bristol City	
5 July 2019	DF	(Denmark)	Matilde Lundorf	(Denmark) VSK Aarhus	
10 July 2019	GK	(England)	Megan Walsh	(England) Yeovil Town	
8 August 2019	MF	(France)	Léa Le Garrec	(France) En Avant de Guingamp	
3 January 2020	GK	(Norway)	Cecilie Fiskerstrand	(Norway) LSK	
23 January 2020	FW	(Republic of Ireland)	Rianna Jarrett	(Republic of Ireland) Wexford Youths	

=== Loans in ===
Date	Position	Nationality	Name	From	Until	Ref.
23 January 2020	FW	(Netherlands)	Maxime Bennink	(England) Reading	End of season	

=== Transfers out ===
Date	Position	Nationality	Name	To	Ref.
14 May 2019	GK	(United States)	Lucy Gillett	(England) Crystal Palace	
14 May 2019	DF	(Republic of Ireland)	Sophie Perry	Retired	
3 July 2019	GK	(Republic of Ireland)	Marie Hourihan	(Portugal) Braga	
5 July 2019	MF	(England)	Chloe Peplow	(England) Tottenham Hotspur	

=== Loans out ===
Date	Position	Nationality	Name	To	Until	Ref.
23 January 2020	GK	(England)	Sophie Harris	(England) Lewes	End of season	
