= 2021–22 Brighton & Hove Albion W.F.C. season =

Brighton & Hove Albion
2021–22 season
- Chairman: Tony Bloom
- Manager: Hope Powell
- Stadium: Broadfield Stadium, Crawley; Falmer Stadium, Falmer
- WSL: 7th
- FA Cup: Fourth round
- League Cup: Group stage
- Top goalscorer: League: Inessa Kaagman and Aileen Whelan (4 goals); All: 4 players (4 goals)
- Highest home attendance: 3,566 vs Leicester City (WSL – 14 November 2021)
- Lowest home attendance: 631 vs Reading (FA Cup – 30 January 2022)
- Average home league attendance: 1,766
- Biggest win: 0–5 vs Birmingham City (WSL – 12 September 2021)
- Biggest defeat: 0–6 vs Manchester City (WSL – 9 January 2022)
Home colours	Away colours	Third colours
- All statistics correct as of 8 May 2022.

The 2021–22 Brighton & Hove Albion W.F.C. season was the club's 31st season in existence and their fourth in the FA Women's Super League, the highest level of the football pyramid. Along with competing in the WSL, the club also contested two domestic cup competitions: the FA Cup and the League Cup.

== Summary ==
Brighton only played two pre-season matches where they came away without a win after a 6–1 away loss at Everton, but a respectable 1–1 draw against Manchester United being played in Loughborough.

The Seagulls opening match of the 2021–22 season was played at Falmer Stadium where they came out on top winning 2–0 over West Ham with a penalty from Inessa Kaagman and Lee Geum-min adding the second, pouncing on The Hammers poor defence, in front of a crowd of 2,264. A week later, Brighton thrashed Birmingham City in a 5–0 away victory to take them top of the WSL table after the second round of matches. Brighton's first loss of the season came in their third match in a 1–0 home loss to Aston Villa on 26 September. The Seagulls ended Tottenham Hotspur's 100% winning start of the season on 10 October, after winning 2–1 at home with goals from Lee Geum-min and Victoria Williams to take Brighton up to fifth.

On 31 October, Brighton were beaten 3–0 away at Arsenal in the semi-final of the 2020–21 FA Cup, which was delayed from the previous season due to the COVID-19 pandemic.

The Seagulls returned to Falmer Stadium on 14 November, where Maisie Symonds scored a 90+3rd-minute winner, the only goal of the game in the 1–0 win over Leicester City, their third league victory on the bounce.

Brighton were knocked out of the League Cup in the group stage after losing 3–0 away at West Ham on 15 December. Their fixture against Arsenal four days later was postponed due to growing fears of COVID-19 cases.

After not playing since 12 December, the Seagulls were thrashed via Manchester City's second half blitz in the 6–0 home thumping loss on 9 January 2022. After four consecutive defeats, Brighton were able to keep a clean sheet and take a point in the 0–0 home draw against defending league champions Chelsea on 23 January, but still go five games without a goal. Four days later The Seagulls finally scored their first goal since 14 November, with Emma Koivisto scoring the opener away at Arsenal, however they went on to lose 2–1.

Three days later, Brighton were knocked out by Reading in the FA Cup fourth round in the thrilling 3–2 home loss where Emma Koivisto scored her second goal in as many games. Brighton won their first match since 14 November, to end a nine match winless run in all competitions, by beating Reading 4–1 at home on 13 February, with Kayleigh Green netting a hat-trick and Koivisto netting her fourth of the season.

== Squad ==
As of 13 February 2022

Note: Flags indicate national team as defined under FIFA eligibility rules; some limited exceptions apply. Players may hold more than one non-FIFA nationality.

No.	Pos.	Nation	Player
1	GK	IRL	Megan Walsh
2	DF	FIN	Emma Koivisto
3	DF	ENG	Felicity Gibbons
4	MF	ENG	Danielle Bowman (captain)
5	DF	NED	Danique Kerkdijk
6	DF	ENG	Maya Le Tissier
7	FW	ENG	Aileen Whelan
8	MF	IRL	Megan Connolly
9	FW	KOR	Lee Geum-min
10	MF	NED	Inessa Kaagman
12	MF	ENG	Libby Bance
15	FW	WAL	Kayleigh Green

No.	Pos.	Nation	Player
16	FW	ENG	Ellie Brazil
17	DF	SWE	Emma Kullberg (on loan from BK Häcken)
18	FW	ENG	Danielle Carter
19	MF	ENG	Emily Simpkins
20	DF	ENG	Victoria Williams
21	MF	SWE	Julia Zigiotti Olme (on loan from BK Häcken)
24	MF	ENG	Maisie Symonds
25	GK	ENG	Francis Angel
29	FW	ENG	Faith Nokuthula
34	DF	BEL	Léa Cordier
40	GK	ENG	Katie Startup

== Preseason ==
15 August 2021 Friendly	Everton	6–1	Brighton & Hove Albion	Halewood
15:00	Finnigan; Duggan; Sørensen; Christiansen; Emslie	Report	Geum-min	Stadium: Finch Farm; Attendance: Behind-closed-doors

28 August 2021 Friendly	Brighton & Hove Albion	1–1	Manchester United	Loughborough
12:00	Unconfirmed	Report	Zelem	Stadium: Loughborough University; Attendance: Behind-closed-doors

== Competitions ==
=== Overview ===
Competition	First match	Last match	Starting round	Final position	Record							
Competition	First match	Last match	Starting round	Final position	Pld	W	D	L	GF	GA	GD	Win %
WSL	5 September 2022	8 May 2022	Matchday 1	7th	22	8	2	12	24	38	−14	36.36
FA Cup	30 January 2022	30 January 2022	Fourth Round	Fourth round	1	0	0	1	2	3	−1	0.00
League Cup	13 October 2021	15 December 2021	Group stage	Group stage	3	1	0	2	1	4	−3	33.33
Total					26	9	2	15	27	45	−18	34.62

Last updated: complete
Source: Competitions

=== FA Women's Super League ===
==== Results summary ====
Overall								Home						Away					
Pld	W	D	L	GF	GA	GD	Pts	W	D	L	GF	GA	GD	W	D	L	GF	GA	GD
22	8	2	12	24	38	−14	26	4	2	5	11	18	−7	4	0	7	13	20	−7

Last updated: 8 May 2022.
Source: FA WSL

==== Results by matchday ====
Round	1	2	3	4	5	6	7	8	9	10	11	12	13	14	15	16	17	18	19	20	21	22
Ground	H	A	H	A	H	A	H	A	H	H	A	H	A	A	H	A	H	A	A	H	A	H
Result	W	W	L	L	W	W	W	L	L	L	L	D	L	L	W	W	L	W	L	L	L	D
Position	2	1	5	7	5	4	3	3	4	7	7	8	8	8	8	7	8	6	6	7	7	7

A = Away; H = Home; W = Win; D = Draw; L = Loss

==== Results ====
5 September 2021 1	Brighton & Hove Albion	2–0	West Ham United	Falmer
14:00	Kaagman 33' (pen.); Geum-min 41'; Symonds (yellow card) 57'	Report	Cissoko (red card) 32'; Longhurst (yellow card) 58'; Stringer (yellow card) 61'	Stadium: Falmer Stadium; Attendance: 2,264; Referee: Emily Heaslip

12 September 2021 2	Birmingham City	0–5	Brighton & Hove Albion	Birmingham
14:00		Report	Williams 2'; Kaagman 45+1' (pen.); Carter 50'; Koivisto 58'; Green 70'; Symonds (yellow card) 80'; Simpkins (yellow card) 90+5'	Stadium: St Andrew's; Attendance: 525; Referee: Lucy May

26 September 2021 3	Brighton & Hove Albion	0–1	Aston Villa	Crawley
14:00		Report	Gielnik 48'	Stadium: Broadfield Stadium; Attendance: 1,140; Referee: Lisa Benn

2 October 2021 4	Chelsea	3–1	Brighton & Hove Albion	Kingston upon Thames
11:30	Reiten 9', (yellow card) 57'; Bright (yellow card) 27'; Kerr 38'; England 80'	Report	Carter 48'; Kaagman (yellow card) 65'	Stadium: Kingsmeadow; Attendance: 2,480; Referee: Amy Fearn

10 October 2021 5	Brighton & Hove Albion	2–1	Tottenham Hotspur	Crawley
14:00	Geum-min 37'; Connolly (yellow card) 70'; V. Williams 86'; Green (yellow card) 90+1'	Report	R. Williams (yellow card) 3' (yellow-red card) 76'; Graham 88'	Stadium: Broadfield Stadium; Attendance: 1,213; Referee: Kirsty Dowle

6 November 2021 6	Everton	0–1	Brighton & Hove Albion	Liverpool
17:30	George (yellow card) 28'	Report	Whelan 61', (yellow card) 82'; Walsh (yellow card) 90+1'	Stadium: Walton Hall Park; Attendance: 502; Referee: Lucy May

14 November 2021 7	Brighton & Hove Albion	1–0	Leicester City	Falmer
14:00	Symonds 90+3'	Report	Bailey-Gayle (yellow card) 75'; Plumptre (yellow card) 85'	Stadium: Falmer Stadium; Attendance: 3,566; Referee: Lisa Benn

21 November 2021 8	Reading	2–0	Brighton & Hove Albion	Reading
14:00	Dowie 3'; Harries 86'	Report		Stadium: Madejski Stadium; Attendance: 733; Referee: Helen Conley

12 December 2021 9	Brighton & Hove Albion	0–2	Manchester United	Crawley
12:30	Williams (yellow card) 80'	Report	Ladd 45+1'; Bøe Risa 69'	Stadium: Broadfield Stadium; Attendance: 1,776; Referee: Abigail Byrne

19 December 2021	Arsenal	P–P	Brighton & Hove Albion	Borehamwood
18:45				Stadium: Meadow Park
Note: Postponed due to a COVID-19 outbreak at Arsenal

9 January 2022 10	Brighton & Hove Albion	0–6	Manchester City	Crawley
12:00	Carter (yellow card) 29'; Whelan (yellow card) 58'	Report	Williams 48' (o.g.); Hemp 50'; Stanway 51'; Coombs 55'; Raso 73'; Losada 76'	Stadium: Broadfield Stadium; Attendance: 1,445; Referee: Emily Heaslip

16 January 2022 11	Leicester City	1–0	Brighton & Hove Albion	Leicester
14:00	O'Brien 54'	Report		Stadium: King Power Stadium; Attendance: 1,667; Referee: Abigail Byrne

23 January 2022 12	Brighton & Hove Albion	0–0	Chelsea	Crawley
12:30		Report	Harder (yellow card) 33'	Stadium: Broadfield Stadium; Attendance: 1,746; Referee: Kirsty Dowle

27 January 2022 13	Arsenal	2–1	Brighton & Hove Albion	Borehamwood
19:30	Miedema 55'; Mead 60'	Report	Koivisto 15'; Brazil (yellow card) 24'; Le Tissier (yellow card) 54'; Williams (yellow card) 60'	Stadium: Meadow Park; Attendance: 1,617; Referee: Kirsty Dowle
Note: Rescheduled from 19 December 2021

6 February 2022 14	Tottenham Hotspur	4–0	Brighton & Hove Albion	Canons Park
14:00	Simon 12', 63'; Neville 57'; Summanen (yellow card) 58'; Zadorsky 62'	Report	V. Williams (yellow card) 23'	Stadium: The Hive; Attendance: 557; Referee: Lauren Impey

13 February 2022 15	Brighton & Hove Albion	4–1	Reading	Crawley
14:00	Green 20', 52', (yellow card) 22'; Whelan 61'; Koivisto 68'; Le Tissier (yellow card) 72'	Report	Woodham (yellow card) 33'; Eikeland 88'	Stadium: Broadfield Stadium; Attendance: 1,159; Referee: Carl Brook

5 March 2022 16	Aston Villa	0–1	Brighton & Hove Albion	Walsall
11:30		Report	Le Tissier 28'; Carter (yellow card) 90+3'	Stadium: Bescot Stadium; Attendance: 496; Referee: Louise Saunders

13 March 2022 17	Brighton & Hove Albion	0–3	Arsenal	Crawley
18:45	Kullberg (yellow card) 81'; Kaagman (yellow card) 90+2'	Report	Williamson (yellow card) 8'; Blackstenius 27', 41'; Mead 34'; Foord (yellow card) 63'	Stadium: Broadfield Stadium; Attendance: 2,535; Referee: Tom Reeves

27 March 2022 18	West Ham United	0–2	Brighton & Hove Albion	Dagenham
15:00		Report	Whelan 3'; Kaagman 81'	Stadium: Victoria Road; Attendance: 1,411; Referee: Paul Howard

3 April 2022 19	Manchester United	1–0	Brighton & Hove Albion	Leigh
12:00	Galton 68'	Report	Koivisto (yellow card) 34'	Stadium: Leigh Sports Village; Attendance: 1,524; Referee: Abigail Byrne

23 April 2022 20	Brighton & Hove Albion	1–3	Birmingham City	Crawley
14:00	Kerkdijk (yellow card) 22'; Le Tissier (yellow card) 74'; Zigiotti Olme 84'	Report	Sarri 9'; Lo. Quinn 75', 88'; Smith (yellow card) 86'	Stadium: Broadfield Stadium; Attendance: 1,209; Referee: Elizabeth Simms

30 April 2022 21	Manchester City	7–2	Brighton & Hove Albion	Manchester
11:30	Shaw 3', 12', 57', 61'; Weir 16'; Greenwood 68'; Hemp 69'	Report	Kaagman 21' (pen.); Zigiotti Olme 45'; Simpkins (yellow card) 90+2'	Stadium: Academy Stadium; Attendance: 1,377; Referee: Amy Fearn

8 May 2022 22	Brighton & Hove Albion	1–1	Everton	Crawley
12:00	Whelan 52'	Report	Finnigan (yellow card) 17'; Björn 45+1'; Turner (yellow card) 69'	Stadium: Broadfield Stadium; Attendance: 1,371; Referee: Louise Saunders

==== League table ====
Pos	Team	Pld	W	D	L	GF	GA	GD	Pts
5	Tottenham Hotspur	22	9	5	8	24	23	+1	32
6	West Ham United	22	7	6	9	23	33	−10	27
7	Brighton & Hove Albion	22	8	2	12	24	38	−14	26
8	Reading	22	7	4	11	21	40	−19	25
9	Aston Villa	22	6	3	13	13	40	−27	21

Source: FA WSL
Rules for classification: 1) Points; 2) Goal difference; 3) Number of goals scored.

=== Women's FA Cup ===
As a member of the first tier, Brighton will enter the FA Cup in the fourth round proper.

30 January 2022 Fourth round	Brighton & Hove Albion	2–3	Reading	Crawley
14:00	Koivisto 64'; Green 76'; Le Tissier (yellow card) 81'	Report	Vanhaevermaet 34'; Rose 51'; Troelsgaard Nielsen (yellow card) 62'; Bryson (yellow card) 78'; Primmer 83'	Stadium: Broadfield Stadium; Attendance: 631; Referee: Lucy May

=== FA Women's League Cup ===
==== Group stage ====
13 October 2021 Group stage	Birmingham City	0–1	Brighton & Hove Albion	Birmingham
19:30	Lu. Quinn (yellow card) 80'	Report	Connolly 45'; Williams (yellow card) 60'	Stadium: St Andrew's; Referee: Lisa Benn

17 November 2021 Group stage	Brighton & Hove Albion	0–1	London City Lionesses	Crawley
19:00		Report	Muya 51'	Stadium: Broadfield Stadium

15 December 2021 Group stage	West Ham United	3–0	Brighton & Hove Albion	Dagenham
19:30	Longhurst 26'; Filis 40'; Svitková 90+4'	Report	Symonds (yellow card) 14'	Stadium: Victoria Road

Pos	Team	Pld	W	WPEN	LPEN	L	GF	GA	GD	Pts	Qualification	WHU	LCL	BHA	BIR
1	West Ham United	3	3	0	0	0	8	0	+8	9	Advances to knock-out stage	—	—	3–0	—
2	London City Lionesses	3	1	1	0	1	3	3	0	5	Possible knock-out stage based on ranking	0–1	—	—	2–2
3	Brighton & Hove Albion	3	1	0	0	2	1	4	−3	3		—	0–1	—	—
4	Birmingham City	3	0	0	1	2	2	7	−5	1		0–4	—	0–1	—

Source: thefa.com
Rules for classification: 1) Points; 2) Goal difference; 3) Number of goals scored; 4) Number of wins; 5) Head-to-head record

== Transfers ==
=== Transfers in ===
Date	Position	Nationality	Name	From	Ref.
15 July 2021	FW	(England)	Danielle Carter	(England) Reading	
13 August 2021	FW	(South Korea)	Lee Geum-min	(England) Manchester City	

=== Loans in ===
Date	Position	Nationality	Name	From	Until	Ref.
26 July 2021	FW	(England)	Rinsola Babajide	(England) Liverpool	8 January 2022	
2 September 2021	GK	(England)	Fran Stenson	(England) Arsenal	7 November 2021	
1 January 2022	DF	(Sweden)	Emma Kullberg	(Sweden) BK Häcken	End of 2022–23 season	
1 January 2022	MF	(Sweden)	Julia Zigiotti Olme	(Sweden) BK Häcken	End of 2022–23 season	

=== Transfers out ===
Date	Position	Nationality	Name	To	Ref.
20 May 2021	MF	(England)	Kirsty Barton	(England) Crystal Palace	
20 May 2021	MF	(England)	Jodie Brett	Retired	
20 May 2021	GK	(Norway)	Cecilie Fiskerstrand	(Norway) LSK Kvinner	
20 May 2021	FW	(Republic of Ireland)	Rianna Jarrett	(England) London City Lionesses	
20 May 2021	MF	(Finland)	Nora Heroum	(Italy) Lazio	
20 May 2021	MF	(England)	Hollie Olding	(England) Charlton Athletic	
20 May 2021	DF	(Northern Ireland)	Laura Rafferty	(England) Southampton	
20 May 2021	DF	(England)	Bethan Roe	(England) Charlton Athletic	
20 May 2021	DF	(New Zealand)	Rebekah Stott	(Australia) Melbourne City	
10 June 2021	DF	(England)	Ellie Hack	(England) Lewes	
13 February 2022	MF	(Nigeria)	Juliet Adebowale	(England) Watford	

=== Loans out ===
Date	Position	Nationality	Name	To	Until	Ref.
19 August 2021	GK	(England)	Katie Startup	(England) Liverpool	5 December 2021	
27 January 2022	MF	(England)	Katie Robinson	(England) Charlton Athletic	End of season	

== Squad statistics ==
=== Appearances ===
As of 8 May 2022

Starting appearances are listed first, followed by substitute appearances after the + symbol where applicable.

No.	Pos	Nat	Player	Total		FA WSL		FA Cup		League Cup	
No.	Pos	Nat	Player	Apps	Goals	Apps	Goals	Apps	Goals	Apps	Goals
Goalkeepers
1	GK	(Republic of Ireland) IRL	Megan Walsh	24	0	20	0	1	0	3	0
25	GK	(England) ENG	Francis Angel	1	0	0	0	0	0	0+1	0
40	GK	(England) ENG	Katie Startup	2	0	2	0	0	0	0	0
Defenders
2	DF	(Finland) FIN	Emma Koivisto	26	4	21+1	3	1	1	2+1	0
3	DF	(England) ENG	Felicity Gibbons	18	0	10+5	0	1	0	2	0
4	DF	(England) ENG	Danielle Bowman	4	0	0+2	0	1	0	1	0
5	DF	(Netherlands) NED	Danique Kerkdijk	21	0	17+3	0	0	0	0+1	0
6	DF	(England) ENG	Maya Le Tissier	25	1	21	1	0+1	0	3	0
17	DF	(Sweden) SWE	Emma Kullberg	14	0	11+2	0	1	0	0	0
20	DF	(England) ENG	Victoria Williams	24	2	21	2	0	0	2+1	0
34	DF	(Belgium) BEL	Léa Cordier	2	0	0	0	0	0	2	0
Midfielders
8	MF	(Republic of Ireland) IRL	Megan Connolly	24	1	16+4	0	0+1	0	1+2	1
10	MF	(Netherlands) NED	Inessa Kaagman	22	4	17+3	4	0	0	1+1	0
12	MF	(England) ENG	Libby Bance	7	0	1+2	0	1	0	2+1	0
19	MF	(England) ENG	Emily Simpkins	14	0	6+6	0	1	0	1	0
21	MF	(Sweden) SWE	Julia Zigiotti Olme	12	2	6+5	2	0+1	0	0	0
24	MF	(England) ENG	Maisie Symonds	20	1	1+15	1	1	0	2+1	0
Forwards
7	FW	(England) ENG	Aileen Whelan	26	4	18+4	4	1	0	2+1	0
9	FW	(South Korea) KOR	Lee Geum-min	19	2	13+3	2	0	0	1+2	0
15	FW	(Wales) WAL	Kayleigh Green	20	4	9+9	3	1	1	1	0
16	FW	(England) ENG	Ellie Brazil	22	0	12+7	0	1	0	2	0
18	FW	(England) ENG	Danielle Carter	21	2	17+4	2	0	0	0	0
29	FW	(England) ENG	Faith Nokuthula	1	0	0	0	0	0	1	0
Players away from the club on loan:
22	MF	(England) ENG	Katie Robinson	9	0	1+5	0	0	0	3	0
Players who appeared for the club but left during the season:
11	FW	(England) ENG	Rinsola Babajide	4	0	1+2	0	0	0	1	0

Note

- Katie Robinson joined Women's Championship side Charlton Athletic on 27 January 2022 on loan until the end of the season.
- Rinsola Babajide's loan spell expired during the season.
