= List of English women's football transfers summer 2019 =

The 2019 English women's football summer transfer window ran from June to September 2019. Players without a club could be signed at any time, clubs could sign players on loan dependent on their league's regulations, and clubs could sign a goalkeeper on an emergency loan if they had no registered senior goalkeeper available. This list includes transfers featuring at least one club from either the Women's Super League or the Women's Super League 2 that were completed after the end of the winter 2018–19 transfer window on 3 February 2019 and before the end of the 2019 summer window.

== Transfers ==
All players and clubs without a flag are English.

Date	Name	Moving from	Moving to	Fee	Ref.
14 May 2019	(Netherlands) Jill Roord	(Germany) Bayern Munich	Arsenal	Transfer	
14 May 2019	(United States) Lucy Gillett	Brighton & Hove Albion	Crystal Palace	Transfer	
14 May 2019	(Republic of Ireland) Sophie Perry	Brighton & Hove Albion	Retired	N/A	
16 May 2019	Ellen White	Birmingham City	Manchester City	Transfer	
17 May 2019	Abbie McManus	Manchester City	Manchester United	Transfer	
17 May 2019	(Austria) Manuela Zinsberger	(Germany) Bayern Munich	Arsenal	Transfer	
21 May 2019	Nikita Parris	Manchester City	(France) Lyon	Free	
28 May 2019	Meaghan Sargeant	Birmingham City	Bristol City	Transfer	
28 May 2019	Charlie Wellings	Birmingham City	Bristol City	Transfer	
30 May 2019	(Scotland) Claire Emslie	Manchester City	(United States) Orlando Pride	Transfer	
30 May 2019	(Portugal) Matilde Fidalgo	(Portugal) Braga	Manchester City	Transfer	
31 May 2019	(Germany) Leonie Maier	(Germany) Bayern Munich	Arsenal	Transfer	
31 May 2019	(Norway) Guro Reiten	(Norway) LSK Kvinner	Chelsea	Transfer	
3 June 2019	Claudia Walker	Everton	Birmingham City	Transfer	
3 June 2019	Laura Coombs	Liverpool	Manchester City	Transfer	
5 June 2019	(Scotland) Jen Beattie	Manchester City	Arsenal	Transfer	
5 June 2019	(Wales) Hayley Ladd	Birmingham City	Manchester United	Free	
10 June 2019	Becky Jane	Reading	Liverpool	Free	
15 June 2019	Melissa Lawley	Manchester City	Liverpool	Free	
20 June 2019	(Norway) Kristine Bjørdal Leine	(Norway) Røa IL	Reading	Transfer	
1 July 2019	(Netherlands) Kika van Es	(Netherlands) AFC Ajax	Everton	Transfer	
1 July 2019	(Netherlands) Danique Kerkdijk	Bristol City	Brighton & Hove Albion	Transfer	
2 July 2019	(Scotland) Abbi Grant	(Belgium) Anderlecht	Birmingham City	Free	
2 July 2019	(Finland) Tinja-Riikka Korpela	(Norway) Vålerenga	Everton	Transfer	
3 July 2019	(Republic of Ireland) Marie Hourihan	Brighton & Hove Albion	(Portugal) Braga	Transfer	
4 July 2019	(Scotland) Lucy Graham	Bristol City	Everton	Transfer	
4 July 2019	Molly Pike	Chelsea	Everton	Transfer	
4 July 2019	(Scotland) Jane Ross	West Ham United	Manchester United	Transfer	
4 July 2019	(Germany) Marisa Ewers	Birmingham City	Aston Villa	Transfer	
4 July 2019	Ella Franklin-Fraiture	Leicester City	Aston Villa	Transfer	
4 July 2019	Melissa Johnson	Leicester City	Aston Villa	Transfer	
5 July 2019	(Morocco) Rosella Ayane	Bristol City	Tottenham Hotspur	Transfer	
5 July 2019	Gemma Davison	Reading	Tottenham Hotspur	Transfer	
5 July 2019	Chloe Peplow	Brighton & Hove Albion	Tottenham Hotspur	Transfer	
5 July 2019	(New Zealand) Ria Percival	West Ham United	Tottenham Hotspur	Transfer	
5 July 2019	(Republic of Ireland) Lucy Quinn	Birmingham City	Tottenham Hotspur	Transfer	
5 July 2019	(Jamaica) Becky Spencer	West Ham United	Tottenham Hotspur	Transfer	
5 July 2019	(Netherlands) Siri Worm	Everton	Tottenham Hotspur	Transfer	
5 July 2019	(Denmark) Matilde Lundorf	(Denmark) VSK Aarhus	Brighton & Hove Albion	Transfer	
5 July 2019	Karen Carney	Chelsea	Retired	N/A	
5 July 2019	Leandra Little	Liverpool	Sheffield United	Transfer	
9 July 2019	(Republic of Ireland) Aoife Mannion	Birmingham City	Manchester City	Free	
9 July 2019	(Jamaica) Jade Bailey	Chelsea	Liverpool	Transfer	
10 July 2019	Megan Walsh	Yeovil Town	Brighton & Hove Albion	Transfer	
11 July 2019	(France) Maéva Clemaron	(France) FC Fleury	Everton	Transfer	
12 July 2019	(Belgium) Yana Daniëls	Liverpool	Bristol City	Transfer	
12 July 2019	Jasmine Matthews	Liverpool	Bristol City	Transfer	
12 July 2019	Mary Earps	(Germany) VfL Wolfsburg	Manchester United	Transfer	
12 July 2019	(Germany) Laura Vetterlein	(Germany) SC Sand	West Ham United	Transfer	
15 July 2019	Ebony Salmon	Manchester United	Bristol City	Transfer	
15 July 2019	Lizzie Durack	Chelsea	Retired	N/A	
16 July 2019	(Scotland) Martha Thomas	(France) Le Havre	West Ham United	Transfer	
17 July 2019	(Wales) Angharad James	Everton	Reading	Transfer	
18 July 2019	(United States) Brianna Visalli	West Ham United	Birmingham City	Transfer	
18 July 2019	(New Zealand) Ali Riley	Chelsea	(Germany) Bayern Munich	Transfer	
19 July 2019	(Australia) Jacynta Galabadaarachchi	(Australia) Perth Glory	West Ham United	Transfer	
20 July 2019	(Netherlands) Sari van Veenendaal	Arsenal	(Spain) Atlético Madrid	Free	
23 July 2019	(Netherlands) Vita van der Linden	(Netherlands) AFC Ajax	Bristol City	Transfer	
24 July 2019	(Northern Ireland) Rebecca Holloway	(United States) Cumberland Phoenix	Birmingham City	Transfer	
24 July 2019	Hannah Godfrey	(United States) South Alabama Jaguars	Tottenham Hotspur	Transfer	
25 July 2019	(France) Kenza Dali	(France) Dijon	West Ham United	Transfer	
1 August 2019	(Northern Ireland) Becky Flaherty	Everton	Sheffield United	Transfer	
1 August 2019	Emily Batty	Doncaster Rovers Belles	Sheffield United	Transfer	
1 August 2019	(Germany) Katharina Baunach	(Germany) VfL Wolfsburg	West Ham United	Transfer	
2 August 2019	Lucy Whipp	(United States) St. John's Red Storm	Birmingham City	Transfer	
6 August 2019	(Netherlands) Dominique Bruinenberg	Everton	(Netherlands) PEC Zwolle	Transfer	
7 August 2019	(United States) Adrienne Jordan	(Italy) Atalanta Mozzanica	Birmingham City	Transfer	
7 August 2019	(South Korea) Lee Geum-min	(South Korea) Gyeongju KHNP	Manchester City	Transfer	
8 August 2019	(Norway) Amalie Eikeland	(Norway) IL Sandviken	Reading	Free	
8 August 2019	(Netherlands) Maxime Bennink	(Netherlands) PEC Zwolle	Reading	Transfer	
8 August 2019	(France) Léa Le Garrec	(France) En Avant de Guingamp	Brighton & Hove Albion	Transfer	
8 August 2019	Alex Greenwood	Manchester United	(France) Lyon	Loan	
9 August 2019	(United States) Courtney Brosnan	(France) Le Havre	West Ham United	Transfer	
9 August 2019	(Republic of Ireland) Tyler Toland	(Republic of Ireland) Sion Swifts	Manchester City	Transfer	
16 August 2019	Esme Morgan	Manchester City	Everton	Loan	
16 August 2019	Fran Stenson	Manchester City	Arsenal	Transfer	
20 August 2019	(Sweden) Lotta Ökvist	(Sweden) Hammarby IF	Manchester United	Transfer	
25 August 2019	Ellie Fletcher	Liverpool	Sheffield United	Loan	
3 September 2019	(New Zealand) Olivia Chance	Everton	Bristol City	Transfer	
