= Ellie Brazil =

English footballer (born 1999)

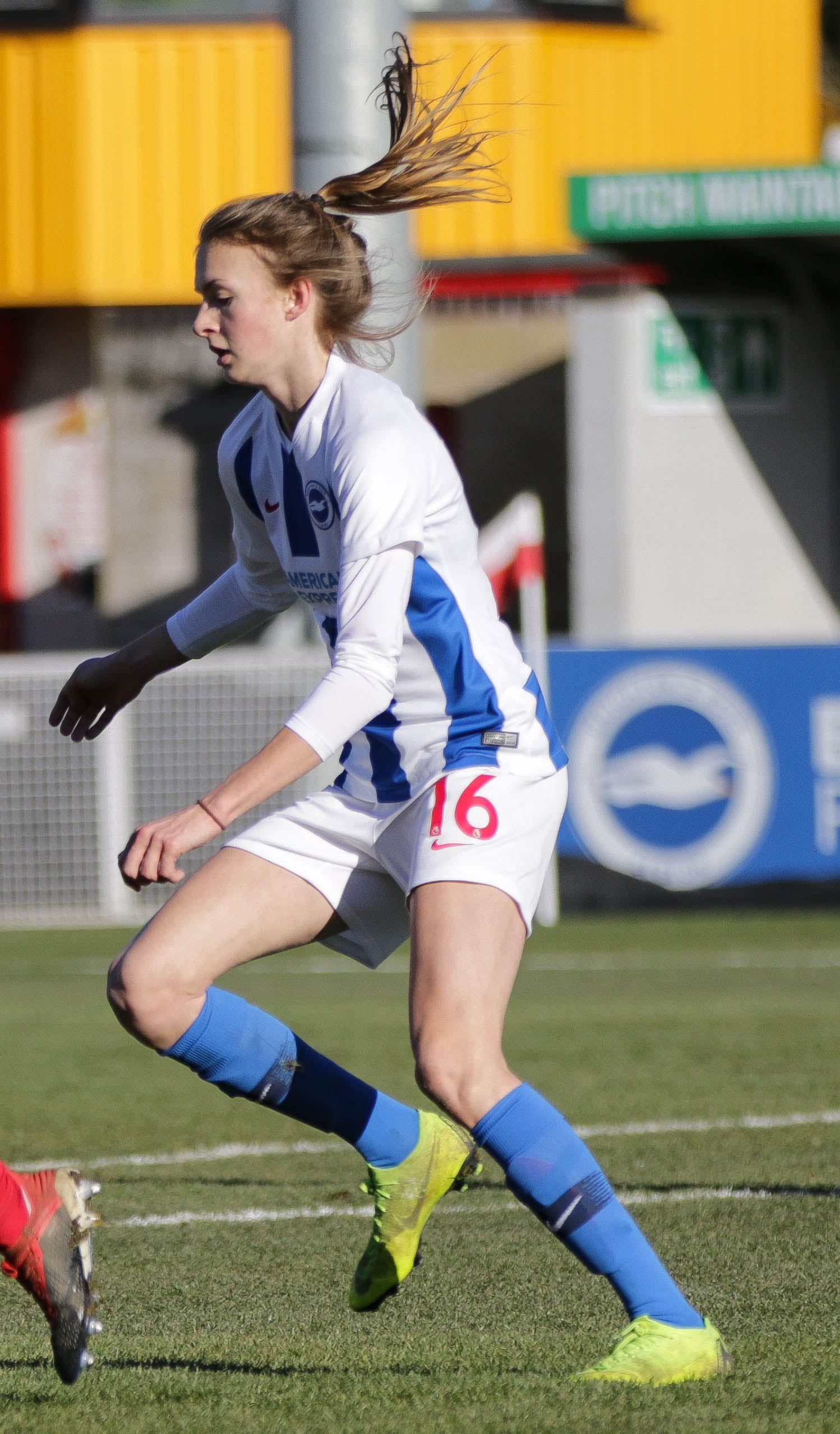

Personal information
- Full name: Ellie Jade Brazil
- Date of birth: 10 January 1999 (age 27)
- Place of birth: West Bridgford, England
- Height: 1.72 m (5 ft 8 in)
- Position: Forward

Team information
- Current team: Southampton FC Women
- Number: 11

Youth career
- Derby County

Senior career*
Years	Team	Apps	(Gls)
2016–2017	Birmingham City	9	(0)
2017–2018	Fiorentina	17	(2)
2018–2022	Brighton & Hove Albion	59	(4)
2022–2024	Tottenham Hotspur	5	(0)
2024–2025	Charlton Athletic	16	(8)
2025–	Southampton F.C. Women	20	(6)

International career^{‡}
2014–2016	England U17	14	(4)
2017–2018	England U19	11	(2)
2017–2018	England U20	2	(1)
2019	England U21	5	(0)
2021–	England U23	2	(0)
- * Club domestic league appearances and goals as of 09:39, 21 November 2023 (UTC) ‡ National team caps and goals as of 17 February 2020

Ellie Jade Brazil (born 10 January 1999) is an English professional footballer who plays for Women's Super League 2 club Southampton. She joined Birmingham City at the age of 16 and has represented England at under-15 to under-23 level.

== Club career ==
Before signing for Birmingham, Brazil played for the Derby County academy and was a gold medal winner in the 800 metres at the 2015 English Schools' Athletics Championships.

=== Fiorentina ===
In August 2017 Ellie signed for Fiorentina Women's FC of Serie A, despite the offer of "an exciting fresh deal" from Birmingham City. She scored her first goal for the team on 28 October 2017 against Sassuolo in the third match of the season.

=== Brighton & Hove Albion ===
On 13 July 2018 former England manager Hope Powell signed Brazil for Brighton stating: "Ellie has already gained valuable experience playing in both England and Italy's top division." She made her debut on the opening day of the season in the match against Bristol City, and scored her first goal in a 3–1 League Cup win over London Bees. She scored her first two league goals for the club in the 75th and 78th minutes of a 3–3 draw against Everton, to help Brighton secure their first point of the season.

In November 2019 Brazil suffered an anterior cruciate ligament injury, which ruled her out for at least the rest of the 2019–20 FA WSL season. She returned to the matchday squad on 18 October 2020 for the game against Everton and returned to the field for the last 31 minutes of the game against Tottenham on 6 December the same year. A week later she played the full 90 minutes against Chelsea.

=== Tottenham Hotspur ===
On 6 July 2022 it was announced that Brazil had signed a two-year deal to sign for Tottenham Hotspur. She made her competitive debut for the side as a 16th minute substitute during a 2–1 win against Leicester City on 18 September 2022. She made her first start on 22 October against Manchester City but picked up a second ACL injury that ruled her out for the rest of the season.

=== Charlton Athletic ===
On 29 July 2024, Brazil was announced at Charlton Athletic on a one year contract. During her time at Charlton Brazil won both the club's Player of the Year and Players' Player of the year awards. On 2 July 2025, it was announced that Brazil had left the club upon the expiry of her contract.

=== Southampton FC ===
On 4 July 2025, it was announced that Brazil had signed with Women's Super League 2 side Southampton.

== International career ==
On 8 January 2019 Brazil was called up to Mo Marley's Under 21 national team training camp. She made her debut for the side on 5 April 2019 during a 1–1 draw with France.

== Personal life ==
On 14 June 2025, Brazil engaged to fellow women's footballer and former England youth teammate Emma Harries.

Her father is former league footballer and manager Gary Brazil.

== Career statistics ==
=== Club ===
As of match played 19 November 2023

Appearances and goals by club, season and competition
Club	Season	League			National Cup (Note: includes Women's FA Cup, Coppa Italia)		League Cup (Note: includes FA Women's League Cup)		Continental (Note: includes UEFA Women's Champions League)		Total	
Club	Season	Division	Apps	Goals	Apps	Goals	Apps	Goals	Apps	Goals	Apps	Goals
Birmingham City	2016	Women's Super League	3	0	0	0	1	0	—		4	0
Birmingham City	2017	Women's Super League	6	0	0	0	—		—		6	0
Birmingham City	Total		9	0	0	0	1	0	—		10	0
Fiorentina	2017–18	Serie A	17	2	1	0	—		2	1	20	3
Brighton & Hove Albion	2018–19	Women's Super League	19	4	0	0	4	2	—		23	6
Brighton & Hove Albion	2019–20	Women's Super League	6	0	0	0	2	0	—		8	0
Brighton & Hove Albion	2020–21	Women's Super League	15	0	3	0	0	0	—		18	0
Brighton & Hove Albion	2021–22	Women's Super League	19	0	1	0	2	0	—		22	0
Brighton & Hove Albion	Total		59	4	4	0	8	2	—		71	6
Tottenham Hotspur	2022–23	Women's Super League	3	0	0	0	1	0	—		4	0
Tottenham Hotspur	2023–24	Women's Super League	2	0	0	0	0	0	—		2	0
Tottenham Hotspur	Total		5	0	0	0	1	0	—		6	0
Career total			90	6	5	0	6	2	2	1	103	9

== Honours ==
=== Club ===
Birmingham City

- FA Women's Cup runner-up: 2016–17

=== International ===
- UEFA Women's Under-17 Championship third place: 2016
