= Kayleigh Barton =

Welsh footballer (born 1988)

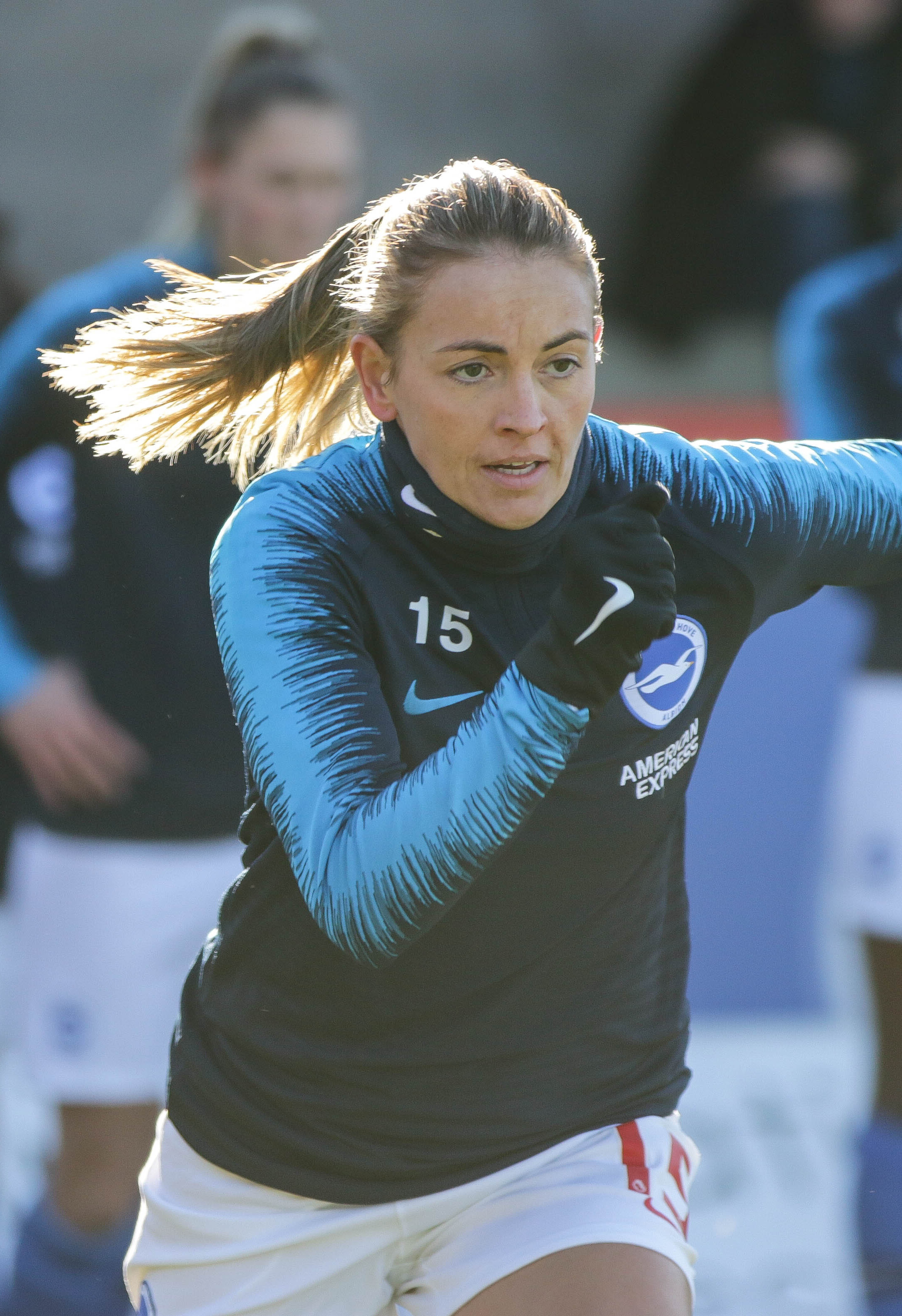
- Kayleigh Green in February 2019

Personal information
- Full name: Kayleigh Anne Marie Barton
- Date of birth: 22 March 1988 (age 38)
- Place of birth: Cardiff, Wales
- Height: 1.75 m (5 ft 9 in)
- Position: Forward

Senior career*
Years	Team	Apps	(Gls)
2012–2016	Cardiff City		
2016–2018	Yeovil Town	29	(1)
2017	→ Chieti Calcio Femminile (loan)	5	(1)
2018–2023	Brighton & Hove Albion	62	(7)
2023–2025	Charlton Athletic	38	(11)

International career
2012–2025	Wales	89	(22)

Managerial career
- 2025–: Saltdean United
- * Club domestic league appearances and goals

Kayleigh Anne Marie Barton (née Green; born 22 March 1988) is a Welsh former professional footballer who played as a forward, making 89 appearances for the Wales national team. She is now a coach with the Welsh national team.

Barton began her career with Cardiff City, before joining Yeovil Town in 2016. She spent time on loan with Italian side Chieti Calcio Femminile in 2017.

== Early life ==
Barton was born in Cardiff, growing up in the Llanedeyrn area of the city. She is one of four children born to her parents, Dave and Cathy Sellwood. She has three brothers. She played football as a teenager but gave up playing on a regular basis at the age of 16, working several different jobs. Barton worked at branches of Tesco and Morrisons, in a call centre and studied plumbing in college.

== Club career ==
Barton decided to return to playing senior football in 2012, joining Cardiff City. She joined Yeovil Town in 2016 and spent time on loan with Italian team Chieti Calcio Femminile during her time there, making five appearances for the Serie B side. In 2018, Barton joined FA WSL 1 club Brighton & Hove Albion upon the expiration of her contract with Yeovil. Barton had previously continued working full-time alongside her playing career prior to joining Brighton.

=== 2020–21 season ===
On 18 October 2020, Barton was seen to be awarded 2 yellow cards in a 2–2 away draw at Everton by referee Lucy Oliver but was not sent off. Toffees boss Willie Kirk told BBC Sport, "It's frustrating the referee made that mistake."

=== Charlton Athletic ===
On 19 July 2023, Barton was announced at Charlton on a one year contract where she remained until 2025.

== International career ==
Barton made her debut for the Wales women's national football team in 2012 against Portugal.

Barton was named in the Wales squad for the 2016 Cyprus Women's Cup. She scored against Finland in the 2016 Cyprus Women's Cup on 2 March 2016, scoring in the 34th minute.

Barton was named in the Wales squad for the 2018 Cyprus Women's Cup as a centre-forward. Wales manager Jayne Ludlow moved Barton from her usual position as a defender to play as a centre-forward for a match against Finland, in which she scored.

Barton was part of the Wales squad that were runners-up in the 2023 Pinatar Cup.

On 19 October 2024, Barton was called up to the Wales side for European qualifying play offs.

Kayleigh currently has 86 caps, scoring 22 goals in her career.

In June 2025, Barton was named in Wales' squad for UEFA Women's Euro 2025. Following the euros, Barton retired from both club and international football with 89 appearances and 22 goals.

== Coaching career ==
=== Saltdean United ===
On 9 June 2025, Barton was named head coach of fifth tier London and South East Women's Regional Football League club Saltdean United, to work alongside Katie McIntyre and Amy Green. Barton later took on a role as Head of Girls’ Football for AF Global in London, leading girls’ development programmes within the organisation’s academy structure. She officially announced her retirement as a player in August 2025.

=== Wales ===
Following her retirement from international play, Barton took up a position coaching with the Wales' under-17s squad before joining the coaching staff of the senior national team ahead of the 2027 World Cup qualifying campaign in March 2026.

== Personal life ==
Green said in a 2022 interview that she will marry her former Brighton teammate Kirsty Barton; they had their wedding the next year. On 10 February 2024, it was announced that Green would go by Kayleigh Barton going forwards.

== Career statistics ==
=== Club ===
Some entries are missing or incomplete due to lack of historical statistics.

Appearances and goals by club, season and competition
Club	Season	League			National Cup		Other		Total	
Club	Season	Division	Apps	Goals	Apps	Goals	Apps	Goals	Apps	Goals
Cardiff City Ladies	2015-16	FA Women's Premier League								
Yeovil Town	2016–17									
Yeovil Town	2017–18	WSL								
Yeovil Town	Total									
Chieti Calcio Femminile (Loan)	2017	Serie B								
Brighton & Hove Albion	2018–19	WSL	18	2	1	0	3	1	22	3
Brighton & Hove Albion	2019–20	WSL	16	2	3	0	4	4	23	6
Brighton & Hove Albion	2020-21	WSL	16	0	3	0	2	0	21	0
Brighton & Hove Albion	2021–22	WSL	18	3	1	1	1	0	20	4
Brighton & Hove Albion	2022–23	WSL	19	1	3	0	3	0	25	1
Brighton & Hove Albion	Total		87	8	11	1	13	5	111	14
Charlton Athletic	2023–24	Women's Championship	21	7	1	0	2	0	24	0
Charlton Athletic	2024–25	Women's Championship	17	0	2	1	2	0	21	1
Charlton Athletic	Total		38	7	3	1	4	0	45	1
Career total										

== Managerial statistics ==
As of match played 3 May 2026

Managerial record by team and tenure
Team	From	To	Record							
Team	From	To	G	W	D	L	GF	GA	GD	Win %
Saltdean United	9 June 2025	Present	29	24	2	3	111	15	+96	82.76
Career total			29	24	2	3	111	15	+96	82.76

== International appearances ==
Appearances and goals by national team and year
National team	Year	Apps	Goals
Wales	Prior to 2012	2	0
Wales	2015	3	0
Wales	2016	8	3
Wales	2017	12	1
Wales	2018	10	5
Wales	2019	8	2
Wales	2020	5	0
Wales	2021	8	4
Wales	2022	13	2
Wales	2023	7	0
Wales	2024	9	4
Wales	2025	4	1
Total		89	22

== International goals ==
No.	Date	Venue	Opponent	Score	Result	Competition
1.	2 March 2016	GSZ Stadium, Larnaca, Cyprus	Finland	1–1	2–2	2016 Cyprus Women's Cup
2.	12 April 2016	BIIK Stadium, Shymkent, Kazakhstan	Kazakhstan	0–1	0–4	UEFA Women's Euro 2017 qualifying
3.	12 April 2016	BIIK Stadium, Shymkent, Kazakhstan	Kazakhstan	0–2	0–4	UEFA Women's Euro 2017 qualifying
4.	28 November 2017	Bosnia and Herzegovina FA Training Centre, Zenica, Bosnia and Herzegovina	Bosnia and Herzegovina	0–1	0–1	2019 FIFA Women's World Cup qualification
5.	28 February 2018	Antonis Papadopoulos Stadium, Larnaca, Cyprus	Finland	0–1	0–1	2018 Cyprus Women's Cup
6.	7 March 2018	AEK Arena, Larnaca, Cyprus	Austria	1–1	1–1 (2–3 p)	2018 Cyprus Women's Cup
7.	7 June 2018	Liberty Stadium, Swansea, Wales	Bosnia and Herzegovina	1–0	1–0	2019 FIFA Women's World Cup qualification
8.	12 June 2018	Newport Stadium, Newport, Wales	Russia	1–0	3–0	2019 FIFA Women's World Cup qualification
9.	12 June 2018	Newport Stadium, Newport, Wales	Russia	2–0	3–0	2019 FIFA Women's World Cup qualification
10.	4 June 2019	Cardiff International Sports Campus, Cardiff, Wales	New Zealand	1–0	1–0	Friendly
11.	3 September 2019	Rodney Parade, Newport, Wales	Northern Ireland	2–1	2–2	UEFA Women's Euro 2022 qualifying
12.	17 September 2021	Parc y Scarlets, Llanelli, Wales	Kazakhstan	1–0	6–0	2023 FIFA Women's World Cup qualification
13.	17 September 2021	Parc y Scarlets, Llanelli, Wales	Kazakhstan	4–0	6–0	2023 FIFA Women's World Cup qualification
14.	22 October 2021	Lendava Sports Park, Lendava, Slovenia	Slovenia	1–1	1–1	2023 FIFA Women's World Cup qualification
15.	26 November 2021	Parc y Scarlets, Llanelli, Wales	Greece	2–0	5–0	2023 FIFA Women's World Cup qualification
16.	12 April 2022	Astana Arena, Astana, Kazakhstan	Kazakhstan	0–1	0–3	2023 FIFA Women's World Cup qualification
17.	15 February 2023	Pinatar Arena, San Pedro del Pinatar, Spain	Philippines	1–0	1–0	2023 Pinatar Cup
18.	9 April 2024	Zahir Pajaziti Stadium, Podujevë, Kosovo	Kosovo	0–2	0–6	UEFA Women's Euro 2025 qualifying
19.	31 May 2024	Parc y Scarlets, Llanelli, Wales	Ukraine	1–1	1–1	UEFA Women's Euro 2025 qualifying
20.	4 June 2024	Dyskobolia Grodzisk Wielkopolski Stadium, Grodzisk Wielkopolski, Poland	Ukraine	1–1	2–2	UEFA Women's Euro 2025 qualifying
21.	12 July 2024	Stadion Branko Čavlović-Čavlek, Karlovac, Croatia	Croatia	0–3	0–3	UEFA Women's Euro 2025 qualifying
22.	25 February 2025	Racecourse Ground, Wrexham, Wales	Sweden	1–1	1–1	2025 UEFA Women's Nations League

=== Player ===
Cardiff City

- Welsh Women's Cup: 2013, 2016

Yeovil Town

- FA WSL 2: 2016

=== Manager ===
Saltdean United

- London and South East Women's Regional Football League Cup: 2025-26
