= Libby Bance =

English footballer

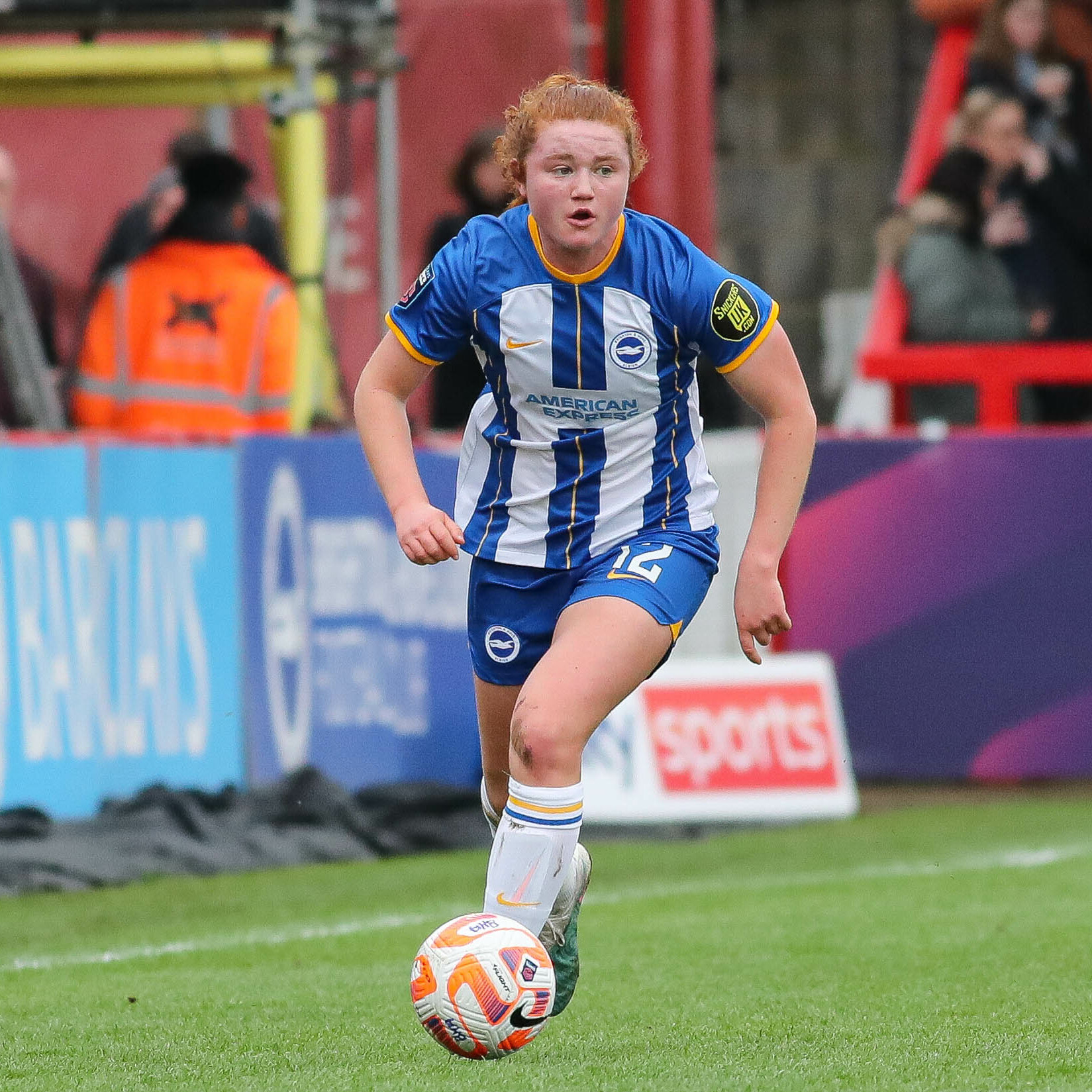
- Bance with Brighton in 2023

Personal information
- Full name: Libby Bance
- Date of birth: 23 July 2003 (age 23)
- Place of birth: Kingston upon Thames, England
- Height: 1.64 m (5 ft 5 in)
- Position: Defensive midfielder

Team information
- Current team: Leicester City
- Number: 23

Youth career
- South Park FC
- 2015–2019: Brighton & Hove Albion

Senior career*
| Years | Team | Apps | (Gls) |
| 2019–2026 | Brighton & Hove Albion | 30 | (0) |
| 2023–2024 | → Rangers (loan) | 15 | (4) |
| 2024–2025 | → Bristol City (loan) | 7 | (1) |
| 2025–2026 | → Birmingham City (loan) | 6 | (0) |
| 2026– | Leicester City | 7 | (0) |
- * Club domestic league appearances and goals as of 15 November 2026

Libby Bance (born 23 July 2003) is an English professional footballer who plays as a defensive midfielder for Women's Super League 2 club Leicester City.

== Club career ==
=== Brighton & Hove Albion ===
Bance impressed as a youth for local club South Park, attracting interest from a host of clubs including Crystal Palace. Bance chose to progress her career with Brighton and after rising through their Academy, she made her senior debut on 20 November 2019 against London Bees in the League cup in a 5–0 win. In October 2020, she came on in added time for her league debut in a 1–0 win against West Ham. She signed a two-year professional contract with Brighton in August 2021. On 4 August 2023 she signed a contract extension with Brighton. On 2 June 2026 it was announced that Bance would be leaving Brighton at the end of June.

==== Loan to Rangers ====
On 14 September 2023, Bance signed for Rangers on loan for the 2023–24 season. On 17 September 2023, Bance made her debut for Rangers scoring two goals in the 12–0 away win against Montrose.

==== Loan to Bristol City ====
On 7 September 2024, Bance signed for Bristol City on loan for the 2024–25 season.

==== Loan to Birmingham City ====
On 4 September 2025, Bance signed for Birmingham City on loan for the 2025–26 season.

=== Leicester City ===
On 11 August 2026, Bance joined Women's Super League 2 side Leicester City on a one-year deal.

== Personal life ==
As of December 2019, Bance was studying for A-Levels in PE, History and Applied Human Biology at Reigate College.

== Career statistics ==
=== Club ===
As of match played 18 November 2026.

Appearances and goals by club, season and competition
| Club | Season | League | | | National Cup (Note: Includes the Women's FA Cup and Scottish Cup) | | League Cup (Note: Includes the Women's League Cup and SWPL Cup) | | Total | |
| Club | Season | Division | Apps | Goals | Apps | Goals | Apps | Goals | Apps | Goals |
|---|---|---|---|---|---|---|---|---|---|---|
| Brighton & Hove Albion | 2019–20 | Women's Super League | 0 | 0 | 0 | 0 | 2 | 0 | 2 | 0 |
| Brighton & Hove Albion | 2020–21 | Women's Super League | 10 | 0 | 0 | 0 | 1 | 0 | 11 | 0 |
| Brighton & Hove Albion | 2021–22 | Women's Super League | 3 | 0 | 0 | 0 | 3 | 0 | 6 | 0 |
| Brighton & Hove Albion | 2022–23 | Women's Super League | 17 | 0 | 4 | 0 | 3 | 0 | 24 | 0 |
| Brighton & Hove Albion | Total | | 30 | 0 | 4 | 0 | 9 | 0 | 43 | 0 |
| Rangers (loan) | 2023–24 | SWPL 1 | 15 | 4 | 2 | 0 | 3 | 0 | 20 | 4 |
| Bristol City (loan) | 2024-25 | Women's Championship | 7 | 1 | 1 | 1 | 1 | 0 | 9 | 2 |
| Birmingham City (loan) | 2025-26 | Women's Super League 2 | 6 | 0 | 2 | 0 | 2 | 0 | 10 | 0 |
| Leicester City | 2026–27 | Women's Super League 2 | 7 | 0 | 0 | 0 | 4 | 0 | 11 | 0 |
| Career total | | | 65 | 5 | 9 | 1 | 19 | 0 | 93 | 6 |

== Honours ==
Birmingham City

- Women's Super League 2: 2025–26
