= Maya Le Tissier =

British footballer (born 2002)

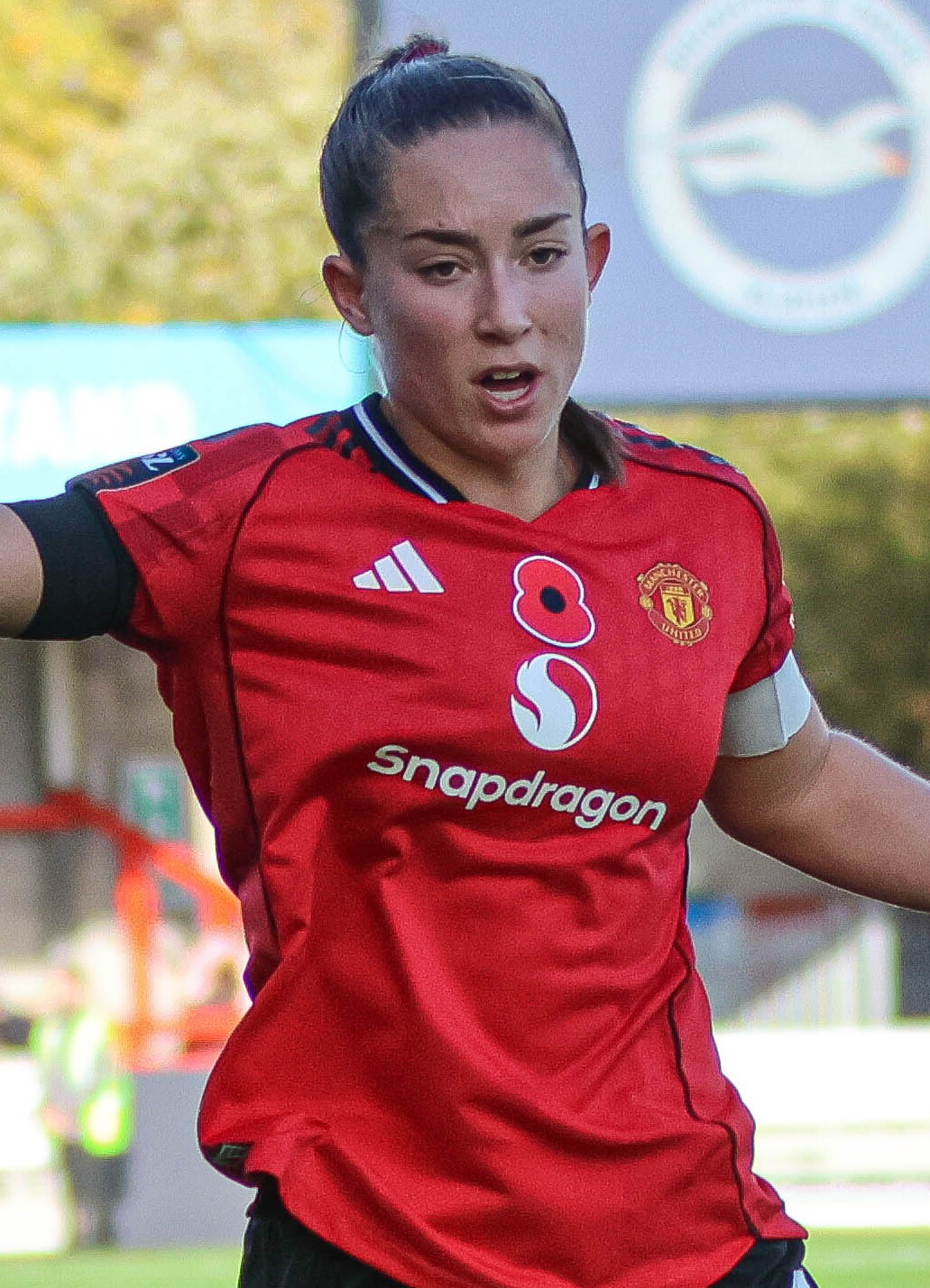
- Le Tissier with Manchester United in 2025

Personal information
- Full name: Maya Lily Le Tissier
- Date of birth: 18 April 2002 (age 24)
- Place of birth: Guernsey
- Height: 5 ft 7 in (1.71 m)
- Position: Centre-back

Team information
- Current team: Manchester United
- Number: 4

Youth career
- 2006–2018: St. Martins A.C. (boy's)
- 2018: Brighton & Hove Albion

Senior career*
| Years | Team | Apps | (Gls) |
| 2018–2022 | Brighton & Hove Albion | 58 | (2) |
| 2022– | Manchester United | 99 | (9) |

International career^{‡}
| 2018 | Guernsey U16 (men's) | 1 | (0) |
| 2018 | England U15 | 1 | (0) |
| 2018–2019 | England U17 | 16 | (1) |
| 2020–2021 | England U19 | 2 | (0) |
| 2021– | England U23 | 6 | (0) |
| 2022– | England | 16 | (1) |
Medal record
Women's football
Representing England
UEFA Women's Championship
| Winner | 2025 Switzerland |
UEFA–CONMEBOL Finalissima
| Winner | 2023 England |
- * Club domestic league appearances and goals as of 18:40, 22 November 2026 (UTC) ‡ National team caps and goals as of 23:55, 13 October 2026

Maya Lily Le Tissier (/meɪjə lə tɪziər/, French: [maja lə tisje]; born 18 April 2002) is a professional footballer who plays as a centre-back for Women's Super League (WSL) club Manchester United, which she captains, and the England national team.

Le Tissier was named to the PFA WSL Team of the Year in 2023 and earned Young Player of the Year honours at the 2024 Women's Football Awards. She was named Manchester United Women's Players' Player of the Year for 2023–24 and Brighton & Hove Albion's Women's Young Player of the Season for 2020–21. She is regarded as one of the best centre-backs in the WSL.

== Club career ==
=== St. Martins A.C. ===
Le Tissier grew up on the channel island of Guernsey. She first played football at the age of four for local boys' club St. Martins A.C., coached by her father, Darren. With no girls' teams on the island, Le Tissier would fly to Hampshire to play for the county team twice a month from the age of 13, doing so for two years until the time commitment meant she was missing too much school and too many training sessions. She continued to play for St. Martins until the age of 16.

=== Brighton & Hove Albion ===
On 1 July 2018, Le Tissier joined the academy at Women's Super League club Brighton & Hove Albion. She was quickly promoted to the first team, being named as an unused substitute for a WSL match against Arsenal on 25 November 2018, and made her senior debut on 5 December, starting and playing the full 90 minutes of a 5–1 League Cup group stage win against Crystal Palace. She made her league debut four days later starting against Chelsea and scored her first goal for the club on 9 May 2021 in a 3–1 league win against Bristol City. She was named as Brighton Women's Young Player of the Season at Albion's end-of-season awards for both the 2020–21 and 2021–22 seasons. In March 2021, she was named by Goal.com in the NXGN 10 best wonderkids list. Le Tissier nominated for PFA Women's Young Player of the Year in June 2022 but lost out to Lauren Hemp, winning the award for a third consecutive season.

=== Manchester United ===
On 20 July 2022, Le Tissier signed a three-year contract with Manchester United. With one year remaining on her Brighton contract, the club triggered a release clause reportedly between £50,000 and £60,000. She made her club debut on 17 September 2022, starting and scoring two goals in a 4–0 opening day WSL win against Reading. She signed a four-year contract extension with the club on 19 April 2024.

Following the departure of Katie Zelem, Le Tissier was named as club captain of Manchester United on 27 August 2024. On 19 October 2024, Le Tissier became the youngest player to reach 100 WSL appearances. She made her 100th appearance for the club on 14 September 2025 during a 5–1 WSL victory against London City Lionesses. She made her 70th consecutive WSL start for Manchester United on 28 September 2025, during a 2-0 away win versus Liverpool and equalled the record for most consecutive WSL starts for a single club set by Aileen Whelan for Brighton & Hove Albion. On 3 October 2025, she became the first player to make 71 consecutive starts for a single club in the home match against Chelsea. She became United's first ever goalscorer in the Champions League as she scored the winning goal from the penalty spot in a 1–0 win at home against Valerenga on 8 October 2025.

== International career ==
=== Guernsey ===
Le Tissier made history when she became the first female player to play for the Guernsey under-16 boys' team, featuring in the under-16 version of the 2018 Muratti Vase against Jersey under-16s in March of that year.

=== England ===
==== Youth ====
Having been invited to an England under-15 south west regional camp, Le Tissier went on to captain the England under-15 women's national team in a single match against the Denmark Under-15s in February 2018. In September 2018, Le Tissier was named captain of the under-17s ahead of 2019 UEFA Women's Under-17 Championship qualification. England won all six qualification games without conceding and Le Tissier was named to the final squad for the 2019 UEFA Women's Under-17 Championship in Bulgaria. She started all three games as England were eliminated at the group stage on head-to-head goal difference having tied on six points with Germany and Netherlands.

Her step up to under-19 level came on 6 March 2020 against Sweden in the La Manga tournament. She made her under-23 debut at the age of 19 in a friendly against Belgium on 25 October 2021.

==== Senior ====
In November 2022, Le Tissier received her first senior England call-up for friendlies against Japan and Norway. She made her debut on 15 November, playing the full 90 minutes in a 1–1 draw with the latter opponent. On 18 November 2022, her England legacy number was announced as number 226. In May 2023, Le Tissier was named to the standby list for the 2023 FIFA Women's World Cup. Le Tissier won her fourth cap for England in their UEFA Women’s Euro 2025 qualifier against the Republic of Ireland on 12 July 2024, playing the full 90 minutes in a 2–1 win at Carrow Road, Norwich.

On 5 June 2025, Le Tissier was named in England's squad for UEFA Women's Euro 2025. She became the first player from Guernsey - female or male - to be selected to represent England at a major senior tournament. She was an unused substitute throughout the tournament as England successfully defended their European title.

On 9 October 2026, Le Tissier scored her first goal for England in a 3–1 2027 FIFA Women's World Cup qualification play-off win against Greece at Pankritio Stadium.

== Personal life ==
Le Tissier's father, Darren, previously played amateur football for St. Martins A.C. She credits him for introducing her to the team of four-year-old boys he was coaching, of which she has said: "credit to the boys back home, if they didn't just see me as another footballer, then I might not be where I am today."

Despite coming from the same small island of Guernsey and sharing a surname, Le Tissier is not related to the former England international footballer Matt Le Tissier, although the two families know each other and Darren had previously played football with Matt. Maya Le Tissier's step brother is England international Alex Scott; They played together as teenagers on Guernsey and would travel to England together for training and games at weekends.

In May 2022, Le Tissier signed up to footballing charity Common Goal, pledging to donate at least one percent of her salary.

== Career statistics ==
=== Club ===
As of match played 22 November 2026

Appearances and goals by club, season and competition
| Club | Season | League | | | FA Cup | | WSL Players Cup | | Continental | | Total | |
| Club | Season | Division | Apps | Goals | Apps | Goals | Apps | Goals | Apps | Goals | Apps | Goals |
|---|---|---|---|---|---|---|---|---|---|---|---|---|
| Brighton & Hove Albion | 2018–19 | WSL | 2 | 0 | 0 | 0 | 1 | 0 | — | | 3 | 0 |
| Brighton & Hove Albion | 2019–20 | WSL | 12 | 0 | 3 | 0 | 4 | 0 | — | | 19 | 0 |
| Brighton & Hove Albion | 2020–21 | WSL | 22 | 1 | 3 | 0 | 2 | 0 | — | | 27 | 1 |
| Brighton & Hove Albion | 2021–22 | WSL | 22 | 1 | 1 | 0 | 3 | 0 | — | | 26 | 1 |
| Brighton & Hove Albion | Total | | 58 | 2 | 7 | 0 | 10 | 0 | 0 | 0 | 75 | 2 |
| Manchester United | 2022–23 | WSL | 22 | 2 | 5 | 0 | 4 | 0 | — | | 31 | 2 |
| Manchester United | 2023–24 | WSL | 22 | 2 | 5 | 0 | 4 | 0 | 2 (Note: Appearances in UEFA Women's Champions League) | 0 | 33 | 2 |
| Manchester United | 2024–25 | WSL | 22 | 3 | 5 | 1 | 4 | 1 | — | | 31 | 5 |
| Manchester United | 2025–26 | WSL | 22 | 1 | 2 | 1 | 3 | 0 | 14 | 2 | 41 | 4 |
| Manchester United | 2026–27 | WSL | 11 | 1 | 0 | 0 | 5 | 2 | — | | 16 | 3 |
| Manchester United | Total | | 99 | 9 | 17 | 2 | 20 | 3 | 16 | 2 | 152 | 16 |
| Career total | | | 157 | 11 | 24 | 2 | 30 | 3 | 16 | 2 | 227 | 18 |

=== International ===
As of match played 13 October 2026

Appearances and goals by national team and year
| National team | Year | Apps | Goals |
|---|---|---|---|
| England | 2022 | 1 | 0 |
| England | 2023 | 1 | 0 |
| England | 2024 | 5 | 0 |
| England | 2025 | 5 | 0 |
| England | 2026 | 4 | 1 |
| Total | | 16 | 1 |

Scores and results list England's goal tally first, score column indicates score after each Le Tissier goal.

List of international goals scored by Maya Le Tissier
| No. | Date | Cap | Venue | Opponent | Score | Result | Competition | Ref. |
|---|---|---|---|---|---|---|---|---|
| 1 | 9 October 2026 | 15 | Pankritio Stadium, Heraklion, Greece | Greece | 2–0 | 3–1 | 2027 FIFA World Cup qualifying play-offs | |

== Honours ==
Manchester United

- Women's FA Cup: 2023–24; runner-up: 2022–23, 2024–25
- Women's League Cup runner-up: 2025–26

England

- UEFA Women's Championship: 2025
- Women's Finalissima: 2023
- Arnold Clark Cup: 2023

Individual

- PFA WSL Team of the Year: 2022–23, 2024–25
- Brighton & Hove Albion Women's Young Player of the Season: 2020–21, 2021–22
- Channel Islands Sports Personality of the Year: 2022
- Manchester United Women's Players' Player of the Year: 2023–24
- Women's Football Awards Young Player of the Year: 2024
- Barclays WSL Team of the Season: May 2025
