= Laura Hartley =

English footballer

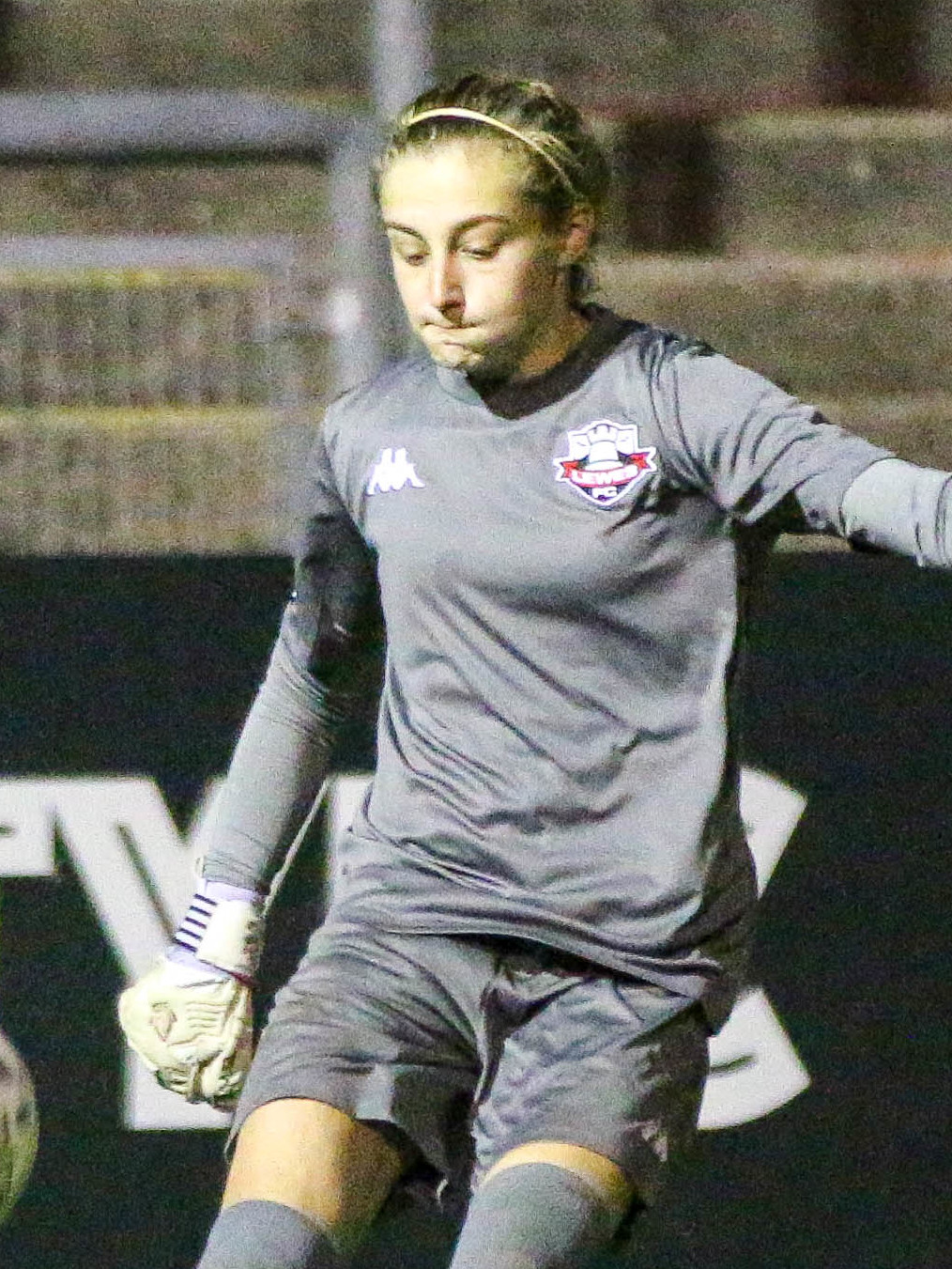
- Hartley with Lewes in October 2020

Personal information
- Date of birth: 31 January 2001 (age 25)
- Place of birth: England
- Position: Goalkeeper

Team information
- Current team: Ipswich Town
- Number: 31

Youth career
- Brighton & Hove Albion

Senior career*
Years	Team	Apps	(Gls)
2018–2020	Brighton & Hove Albion	3	(0)
2019–2020	→ Lewes (loan)	1	(0)
2020–2023	Lewes	4	(0)
2023–	Ipswich Town	0+	(0)
2026–	Hashtag United F.C.	0	(0)
- * Club domestic league appearances and goals

Laura Hartley (born 31 January 2001) is an English professional footballer who plays as a goalkeeper for Hashtag United F.C., on loan from Ipswich Town.

She previously played for Lewes, she joined the FA Women's Championship club from Brighton & Hove Albion of the FA WSL, initially on loan.

== Club career ==
Hartley's professional debut was in April 2018 against London Bees. Hartley played in Brighton's first ever FA WSL game in September 2018, in a 1–0 loss, after Marie Hourihan and Sophie Harris were both injured. Hartley was then selected for the club's pre-season training camp in Spain in preparation for the 2019–20 season.

She signed for Lewes in August 2020, having already made one appearance while at the club on loan the previous season.

On 27 July 2026, Hartley was announced at Hashtag United.

== Career statistics ==
Club	Season	League			FA Cup		League Cup		Total	
Club	Season	Division	Apps	Goals	Apps	Goals	Apps	Goals	Apps	Goals
Brighton & Hove Albion	2018–19	FA WSL	1	0	0	0	0	0	1	0
Brighton & Hove Albion	2019–20	FA WSL	0	0	0	0	0	0	0	0
