= Bethan Roe =

English footballer

Beth Roe
Personal information
- Full name: Bethan Fay Roe
- Date of birth: 3 November 1999 (age 27)
- Place of birth: Norwich, Norfolk, England
- Position: Full-back

Team information
- Current team: Ipswich Town
- Number: 22

Youth career
- Norwich City
- Worthing College
- 2016–2017: Brighton & Hove Albion

Senior career*
Years	Team	Apps	(Gls)
2016–2021	Brighton & Hove Albion	13	(0)
2020–2021	→ Charlton Athletic (loan)	8	(0)
2021–2025	Charlton Athletic	100	(3)
2025–	Ipswich Town	7	(0)
- * Club domestic league appearances and goals as of 01:14, 27 October 2024 (UTC)

Bethan Fay Roe (born 3 November 1999) is an English professional footballer who plays as a defender for Ipswich Town.

== Club career ==
=== Norwich City ===
She started her career at her hometown club Norwich City where she rose through their youth ranks before moving to Albion.

=== Brighton ===
She initially featured for Brighton & Hove Albion's academy side in partnership with Worthing College.

=== Charlton Athletic ===
On 9 July 2024, Roe signed a new one year contract with Charlton Athletic. On 2 July 2025, it was announced that Roe's contract had expired and she had departed Charlton.

=== Ipswich Town ===
On 31 July 2025 Roe joined Ipswich Town on a permanent transfer.

== Career statistics ==
As of 27 January 2021

Club	Season	League			National Cup		Total	
Club	Season	Division	Apps	Goals	Apps	Goals	Apps	Goals
Brighton & Hove Albion	2017-18	WSL 2	8	0	4	0	12	0
Brighton & Hove Albion	2018-19	FA WSL	2	0	2	1	4	1
Brighton & Hove Albion	2019-20	FA WSL	0	0	1	0	1	0
Brighton & Hove Albion	2020-21	FA WSL	1	0	2	0	3	0
Brighton & Hove Albion	Total		11	0	9	1	20	1
Charlton Athletic	2020-21	Women's Championship	8	0	2	0	8	0
Career total			19	0	11	1	28	1
