= Matilde Lundorf Skovsen =

Danish footballer (born 1999)

Matilde Lundorf
Personal information
- Full name: Matilde Lundorf Skovsen
- Date of birth: 19 January 1999 (age 27)
- Place of birth: Nottingham, England
- Position: Defender

Team information
- Current team: Vålerenga
- Number: 18

Youth career
- IK Skovbakken
- 2015–2016: Paris Saint-Germain

Senior career*
Years	Team	Apps	(Gls)
2016–2019	VSK Aarhus	48	(1)
2019–2020	Brighton & Hove Albion	8	(0)
2020–2023	Juventus	40	(1)
2023	HB Køge	10	(0)
2023–2024	Como	24	(0)
2024–2025	Napoli	25	(1)
2025–	Vålerenga	2	(0)

International career^{‡}
2014	Denmark U16	8	(1)
2015–2016	Denmark U17	12	(0)
2016–2018	Denmark U19	25	(0)
2018–	Denmark U23	10	(0)
2022–	Denmark	2	(0)
- * Club domestic league appearances and goals as of 4 October 2025 ‡ National team caps and goals as of 6 April 2025

Matilde Lundorf Skovsen (born 19 January 1999) is a Danish professional footballer who plays as a defender for Toppserien club Vålerenga and the Denmark national team.

== Club career ==
In 2015–16, Lundorf Skovsen spent a season playing with the youth team of Paris Saint-Germain Féminine. She then returned home to Denmark, where she played for VSK Aarhus in the Elite division, from 2016 to the summer of 2019. In July 2019 she signed a one-year professional contract with Brighton & Hove Albion of the English FA Women's Super League.

On 7 July 2020, Lundorf joined Juventus.

== International career ==
Lundorf Skovsen appeared 25 times for the Denmark national under-19 team, including at the 2018 edition of the UEFA Under-19 Championship in Switzerland, as well as 12 international matches for the under-17 national team. She made her debut in November 2018 on Denmark's under-23 national team, where she was substituted in the 58th minute for Emilie Henriksen.

In 2022 she was called up to the senior national team of Denmark.

== Honours ==
Juventus

- Serie A: 2020–21, 2021–22
- Coppa Italia: 2021–22
- Supercoppa Italiana: 2020–21, 2021–22
