= Lee Geum-min =

South Korean footballer (born 1994)

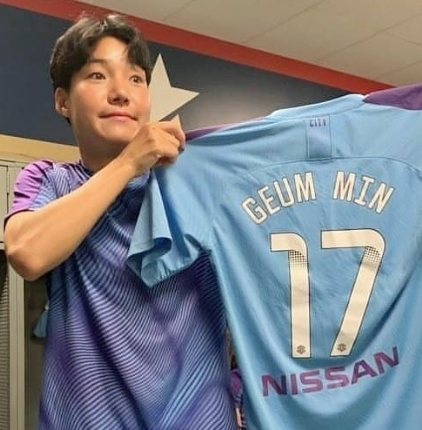
- Lee with Manchester City shirt in 2019

Personal information
- Date of birth: 7 April 1994 (age 32)
- Place of birth: South Korea
- Height: 1.69 m (5 ft 7 in)
- Position: Forward

Team information
- Current team: Birmingham City
- Number: 7

Youth career
- Hyundai Info-Tech HS
- Ulsan College

Senior career*
Years	Team	Apps	(Gls)
2015–2017	Seoul City		
2018–2019	Gyeongju KHNP		
2019–2021	Manchester City	3	(1)
2020–2021	→ Brighton & Hove Albion (loan)	17	(3)
2021–2024	Brighton & Hove Albion	58	(7)
2024–	Birmingham City	32	(4)

International career^{‡}
2009–2010	South Korea U17	11	(3)
2011–2014	South Korea U20	16	(6)
2013–	South Korea	101	(27)
- * Club domestic league appearances and goals as of 17 October 2026 ‡ National team caps and goals as of 17:28, 2 May 2026 (UTC)

Lee Geum-min (Korean: 이금민, Korean pronunciation: [i.ɡɯm.min] or [i] [kɯm.min]; born 7 April 1994) is a South Korean professional footballer who plays as a forward for Women's Super League club Birmingham City and the South Korea women's national team. She has previously played for Seoul City, Gyeongju KHNP, Manchester City and Brighton & Hove Albion.

== Club career ==
=== Seoul WFC ===
On 4 November 2014, Lee was drafted first overall by Seoul WFC. She made 18 appearances in the 2015 season, with six goals and two assists. The following season, she scored nine goals and registered four assists in 18 appearances. In her final season with Seoul, Lee scored eleven goals and had six assists in 21 appearances.

=== Gyeongju KHNP ===
In 2018, Lee joined Gyeongju KHNP. On 23 April 2018, she made her debut in a 0–0 draw with Incheon Hyundai Steel Red Angels. On 14 May 2018, she scored twice in a 3–0 away victory against Changnyeong WFC. In her final game for Gyeongju KHNP, Lee scored a hat-trick as her team won 3–0 away at Boeun Sangmu, having previously scored two goals in the previous match, her last at home, a 5–2 win over Suwon UDC.

=== Manchester City ===
On 7 August 2019, Manchester City announced they had signed Lee on a two-year contract. She made her Women's Super League (WSL) debut on 7 September 2019, coming on as a second-half substitute against Manchester United at the Etihad Stadium; the match broke the league's attendance record at 31,213. Lee made her UEFA Women's Champions League debut and first City start in a 7–1 away win against Swiss team FF Lugano 1976 on 12 September 2019. She scored her first goal for Manchester City on 12 October 2019, coming on as a late substitute at home to Birmingham City to seal a 3–0 victory.

==== Loan to Brighton & Hove Albion ====
On 24 July 2020, it was announced that Lee had joined WSL team Brighton & Hove Albion on loan for the 2020–21 season with head coach Hope Powell describing the signing as "a real coup." She made her debut for Brighton in the season opener, a 2–0 home win against Birmingham City on 6 September 2020. Lee made her FA Cup debut on 27 September 2020, starting in Brighton's quarter-final also against Birmingham City.

On 7 February 2021, Lee was part of the Brighton team that ended Chelsea's 33-match unbeaten run with a 2–1 victory for the Seagulls. Her first goal for Brighton, a header, came in the away fixture at Reading on 2 May 2021. Her second, a long-range hit, came just a minute later when she intercepted the ball from Reading's kick-off. The strike was described as an contender for WSL goal of the season. Lee then went on to score in Brighton's next fixture, an end-of-season game at home to Bristol.

=== Brighton & Hove Albion ===
Lee transferred permanently to Brighton from Manchester City in August 2021. She scored for Albion in their 2021–22 season opener against West Ham United on 5 September 2021. It was her fourth goal in her last three WSL games, including the final two matches of the previous season.

=== Birmingham City ===
In September 2024, Lee joined Women's Championship club Birmingham City on a two-year permanent deal for an undisclosed fee, subject to league and visa approval.

== International career ==
Lee was a member of the under-16 team that won the 2009 AFC U-16 Women's Championship and was in the under-17 team that claimed the FIFA U-17 Women's World Cup the following year. She made two appearances at the 2011 AFC U-19 Women's Championship, scoring two goals against Australia in a 4–2 win. In 2013, she helped South Korea win the 2013 AFC U-19 Women's Championship and qualify for the 2014 FIFA U-20 Women's World Cup. Lee was selected by South Korea for the 2015 Women's World Cup and the 2019 Women's World Cup.

== Career statistics ==
=== Club ===
As of match played 17 October 2026

Appearances and goals by club, season and competition
Club	Season	League			National cup (Note: Includes Women's FA Cup)		League cup (Note: Includes WSL Players Cup)		Continental (Note: Includes UEFA Women's Champions League)		Total	
Club	Season	Division	Apps	Goals	Apps	Goals	Apps	Goals	Apps	Goals	Apps	Goals
Manchester City	2019–20	Women's Super League	3	1	0	0	2	0	3	0	8	1
Brighton & Hove Albion (loan)	2020–21	Women's Super League	17	3	1	0	2	0	—		20	3
Brighton & Hove Albion	2021–22	Women's Super League	16	2	1	0	2	0	—		19	2
Brighton & Hove Albion	2022–23	Women's Super League	22	3	3	2	3	1	—		28	6
Brighton & Hove Albion	2023–24	Women's Super League	20	2	3	0	3	0	—		26	2
Brighton & Hove Albion	Total		58	7	7	2	8	1	0	0	73	10
Birmingham City	2024–25	Women's Championship	15	4	0	0	1	0	—		16	4
Birmingham City	2025–26	Women's Super League 2	11	0	2	1	0	0	—		13	1
Birmingham City	2026–27	Women's Super League	6	0	0	0	1	1	—		7	1
Birmingham City	Total		32	4	2	1	2	1	—		36	6
Career total			110	15	10	3	14	2	3	0	137	20

=== International ===
As of match played 15 April 2026

Appearances and goals by national team and year
National team	Year	Apps	Goals
South Korea	2013	4	1
South Korea	2015	9	0
South Korea	2016	8	6
South Korea	2017	9	4
South Korea	2018	13	3
South Korea	2019	11	2
South Korea	2020	2	0
South Korea	2021	8	2
South Korea	2022	11	2
South Korea	2023	11	7
South Korea	2024	4	0
South Korea	2025	9	0
South Korea	2026	2	0
Total		101	27

Scores and results list South Korea's goal tally first, score column indicates score after each Lee goal.

List of international goals scored by Lee Guen-min
No.	Date	Venue	Opponent	Score	Result	Competition
1	6 March 2013	Tasos Markou Stadium, Paralimni, Cyprus	South Africa	2–0	2–0	2013 Cyprus Women's Cup
2	9 March 2016	Nagai Stadium, Osaka, Japan	Vietnam	3–0	4–0	2016 Olympic Games qualification
3	8 November 2016	Hong Kong Football Club Stadium, Hong Kong	Guam	10–0	13–0	2017 EAFF Women's East Asian Cup qualification
4	11 November 2016	Hong Kong Football Club Stadium, Hong Kong	Hong Kong	1–0	14–0	2017 EAFF Women's East Asian Cup qualification
5	11 November 2016	Hong Kong Football Club Stadium, Hong Kong	Hong Kong	11–0	14–0	2017 EAFF Women's East Asian Cup qualification
6	11 November 2016	Hong Kong Football Club Stadium, Hong Kong	Hong Kong	12–0	14–0	2017 EAFF Women's East Asian Cup qualification
7	14 November 2016	Hong Kong Football Club Stadium, Hong Kong	Chinese Taipei	4–0	9–0	2017 EAFF Women's East Asian Cup qualification
8	5 April 2017	Kim Il-sung Stadium, Pyongyang, North Korea	India	3–0	10–0	2018 AFC Women's Asian Cup qualification
9	5 April 2017	Kim Il-sung Stadium, Pyongyang, North Korea	India	4–0	10–0	2018 AFC Women's Asian Cup qualification
10	5 April 2017	Kim Il-sung Stadium, Pyongyang, North Korea	India	7–0	10–0	2018 AFC Women's Asian Cup qualification
11	9 April 2017	Kim Il-sung Stadium, Pyongyang, North Korea	Hong Kong	5–0	6–0	2018 AFC Women's Asian Cup qualification
12	13 April 2018	King Abdullah II Stadium, Amman, Jordan	Vietnam	2–0	4–0	2018 AFC Women's Asian Cup
13	24 August 2018	Gelora Sriwijaya Stadium, Palembang, Indonesia	Hong Kong	3–0	5–0	2018 Asian Games
14	31 August 2018	Gelora Sriwijaya Stadium, Palembang, Indonesia	Chinese Taipei	2–0	4–0	2018 Asian Games
15	17 January 2019	Wuhua County Olympic Sports Centre, Meizhou, China	Romania	3–0	3–0	2019 Four Nations Tournament
16	6 April 2019	Yongin Mireu Stadium, Yongin, South Korea	Iceland	2–2	2–3	Friendly
17	17 September 2021	Pakhtakor Stadium, Tashkent, Uzbekistan	Mongolia	3–0	12–0	2022 AFC Women's Asian Cup qualification
18	17 September 2021	Pakhtakor Stadium, Tashkent, Uzbekistan	Mongolia	6–0	12–0	2022 AFC Women's Asian Cup qualification
19	24 January 2022	Shree Shiv Chhatrapati Sports Complex, Pune, India	Myanmar	1–0	2–0	2022 AFC Women's Asian Cup
20	9 April 2022	Goyang Stadium, Goyang, South Korea	Vietnam	3–0	3–0	Friendly
21	19 February 2023	Coventry Building Society Arena, Coventry, England	Belgium	1–0	1–2	2023 Arnold Clark Cup
22	7 April 2023	Suwon World Cup Stadium, Suwon, South Korea	Zambia	2–2	5–2	Friendly
23	7 April 2023	Suwon World Cup Stadium, Suwon, South Korea	Zambia	3–2	5–2	Friendly
24	11 April 2023	Yongin Mireu Stadium, Yongin, South Korea	Zambia	1–0	5–0	Friendly
25	11 April 2023	Yongin Mireu Stadium, Yongin, South Korea	Zambia	3–0	5–0	Friendly
26	11 April 2023	Yongin Mireu Stadium, Yongin, South Korea	Zambia	4–0	5–0	Friendly
27	26 October 2023	Xiamen Egret Stadium, Xiamen, China	Thailand	8–0	10–1	2024 Olympic Games qualification

== Honours ==
Birmingham City

- Women's Super League 2: 2025–26

South Korea

- AFC U-16 Women's Championship: 2009
- FIFA U-17 Women's World Cup: 2010
- AFC U-19 Women's Championship: 2013
