= Lucy Gillett =

English-American soccer player

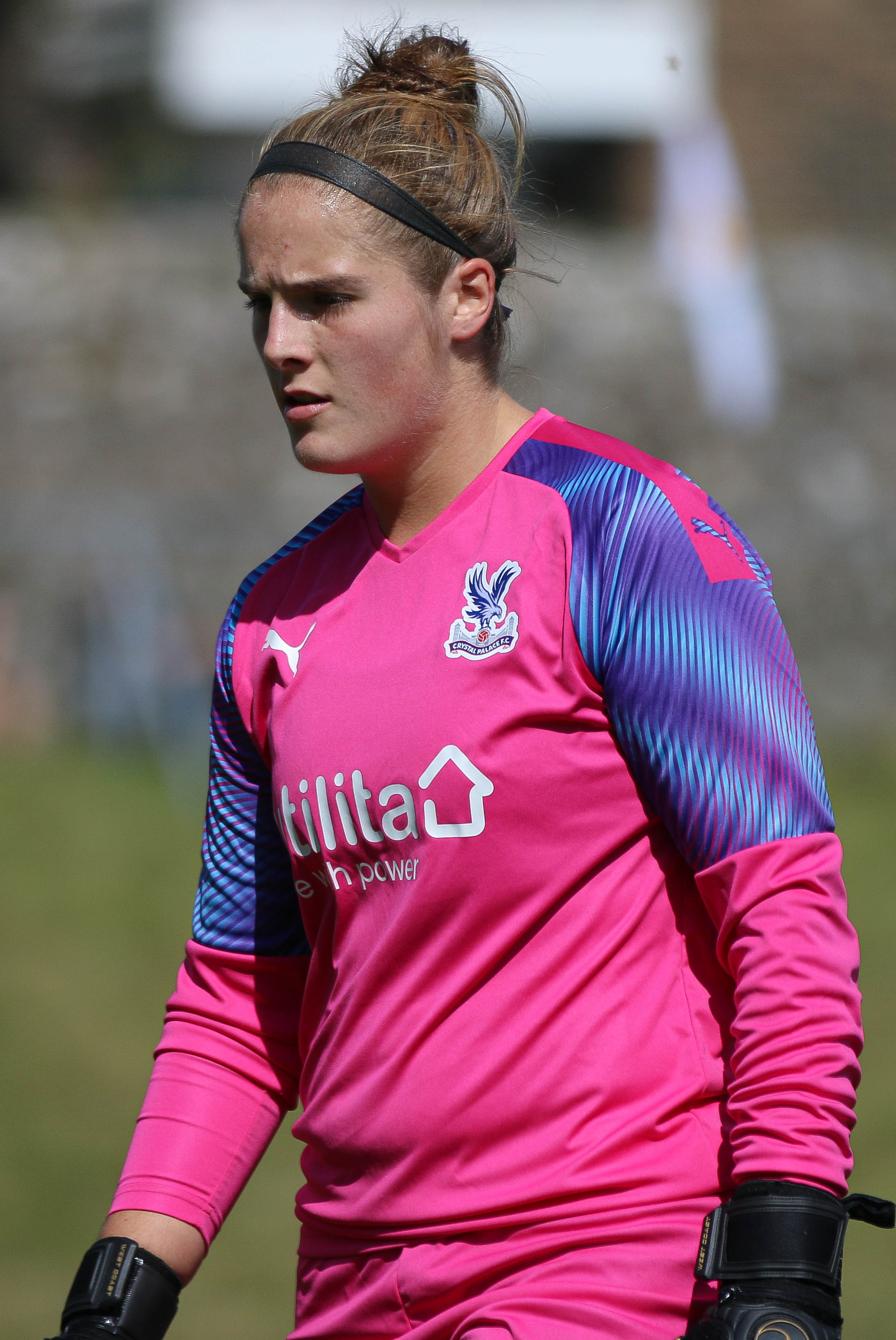

Personal information
- Date of birth: October 23, 1993 (age 33)
- Place of birth: Rockville Centre, New York
- Height: 5 ft 10 in (1.78 m)
- Position: Goalkeeper

College career
Years	Team	Apps	(Gls)
2011–2012	Hofstra Pride	2	(0)
2013–2014	Springfield Pride	37	(0)

Senior career*
Years	Team	Apps	(Gls)
2016	Watford		
2017–2019	Brighton & Hove Albion	13	(0)
2019	Crystal Palace (loan)	8	(0)
2019–2020	Crystal Palace	13	(0)

Managerial career
- 2022–2023: LIU Sharks
- * Club domestic league appearances and goals

Lucy Gillett (born October 23, 1993) is a professional footballer who plays as a goalkeeper.

== Life and career ==
Born in New York, Gillett was raised in England before returning to Long Island, New York at an early age. She is a graduate of South Side High School and completed her Bachelor of Science in Physical Education at Hofstra University and Springfield College, having earned both academic and athletic scholarships.

Gillett began her professional career playing for Watford before moving up to Brighton & Hove Albion. While signed with Brighton, Gillett was loaned to Crystal Palace of the Women's Championship with whom she was signed for the following season.

Gillett is a vocal supporter of increasing awareness of issues in women's football, having been the target of sexist abuse on the field. On 12 January 2020 at an away match against Coventry United Ladies at Butts Park Arena, Gillett reported to the referee after the first half that a group of men standing behind her goal made several verbally abusive and sexist comments, including shouting that the referee ought to confirm the gender of various players. Gillett later commented to the BBC that "It is something I don't think should be at a women's game – or any game. It is not acceptable." The event prompted Gillett's former manager Hope Powell to respond, "There need to be proper sanctions in place to stop these people coming and supporting the game that everybody loves." before stating that if she had been the target of the abuse she would have walked off.
