= Emily Simpkins =

English footballer

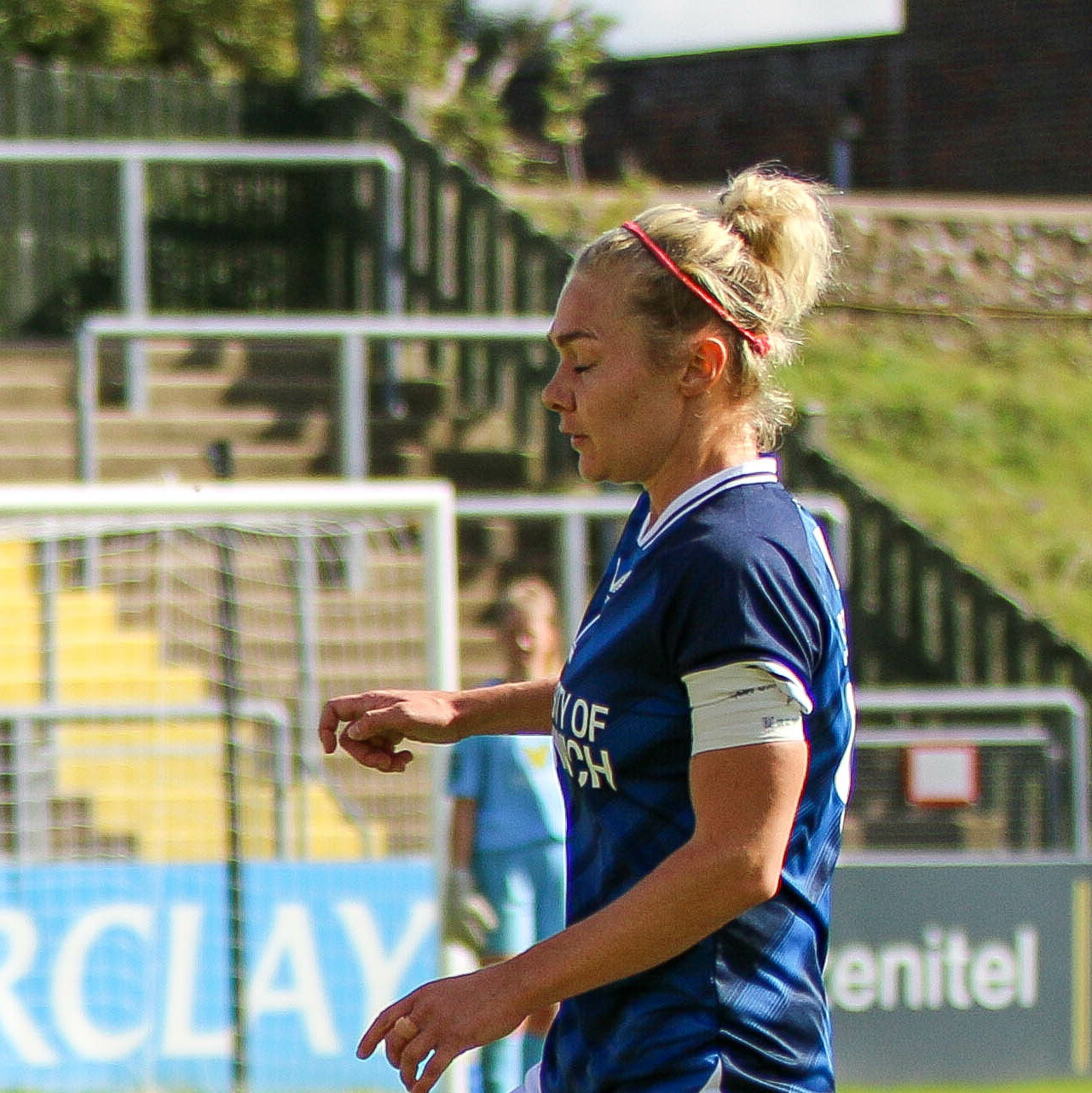
- Emily Simpkins captain of Charlton Athletic Women in 2022

Personal information
- Full name: Emily Kate Simpkins
- Date of birth: 25 May 1990 (age 36)
- Place of birth: Burton upon Trent, England
- Position: Midfielder

Youth career
- Leicester City Women

Senior career*
Years	Team	Apps	(Gls)
2007–2009	Nottingham Forest	20	(0)
2009–2010	Doncaster Rovers Belles	16	(0)
2010–2011	Leicester City Women	12	(0)
2011–2012	Coventry City	20	(0)
2012–2015	Birmingham City	12	(2)
2016–2018	Doncaster Rovers Belles	32	(3)
2018–2022	Brighton & Hove Albion	42	(0)
2022–2023	Charlton Athletic	21	(6)
- * Club domestic league appearances and goals

Emily Kate Simpkins (born 25 May 1990) is an English former footballer who played as a midfielder.

She was one of five players who joined Charlton in 2022. The others were Angela Addison, Freda Ayisi, Corinne Henson and Sophie O'Rourke.
