= Cecilie Fiskerstrand =

Norwegian footballer (born 1996)

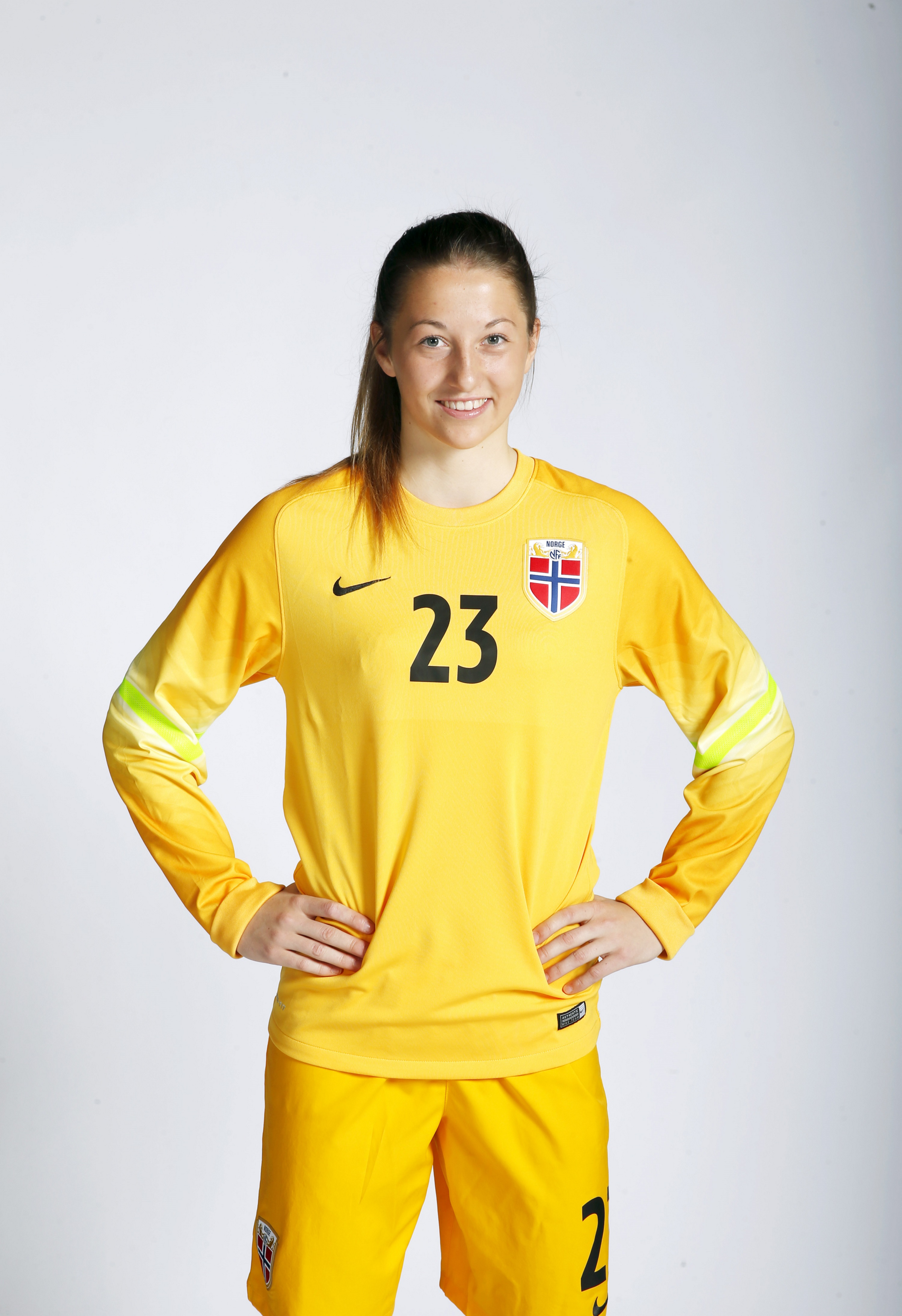

Personal information
- Full name: Cecilie Hauståker Fiskerstrand
- Date of birth: 20 March 1996 (age 30)
- Place of birth: Lørenskog, Norway
- Height: 1.74 m (5 ft 9 in)
- Position: Goalkeeper

Team information
- Current team: Fiorentina
- Number: 1

Youth career
- 2013: Langevåg
- 2014: Fortuna Ålesund
- 2014: Stabæk

Senior career*
Years	Team	Apps	(Gls)
2012–2014	Fortuna Ålesund	10	(0)
2015	Stabæk	3	(0)
2015	Stabæk B	9	(0)
2016–2019	LSK Kvinner	63	(0)
2020–2021	Brighton & Hove Albion	7	(0)
2021–2024	LSK Kvinner	34	(0)
2024–	Fiorentina	24	(0)

International career^{‡}
2011	Norway U15	2	(0)
2011–2012	Norway U16	5	(0)
2013	Norway U17	1	(0)
2013–2014	Norway U19	9	(0)
2015	Norway U23	1	(0)
2014–	Norway	75	(0)
- * Club domestic league appearances and goals as of 3 July 2025 ‡ National team caps and goals as of 14 October 2026

Cecilie Hauståker Fiskerstrand (born 20 March 1996) is a Norwegian footballer who plays as a goalkeeper for Fiorentina and the Norway national team.

== Club career ==
Fiskerstrand began her career in Langevåg. In 2014, she moved to the second division club Fortuna Ålesund, where she first played in the U-19 team and then also for the senior team. In the same year, she moved to toppserien club Stabæk. In November 2015 Fiskerstrand transferred from Stabæk to reigning champions LSK Kvinner FK.

Fiskerstand signed a one-and-a-half-year contract with Brighton & Hove Albion W.F.C. in January 2020. She stayed there until the end of the contract, but decided to leave after that due to a lack of playing time. In total, she played 7 matches for the club during the 2019–2020 season. In her debut match, she kept a clean sheet. After her second match, which was against Chelsea, she was rewarded with a place on the team.

Fiskerstrand returned to LSK Kvinner in June 2021. In May 2022, she suffered a rupture in one of the cruciate ligaments in the knee and was unable to play the rest of the 2022 season in Toppserien.

== International career ==
On 17 January 2014, she earned her first international cap in senior team in a match against England in La Manga, Spain. She earned a second cap only almost a year later, again in La Manga when she came off the bench replacing the veteran Ingrid Hjelmseth, on 15 January 2015. She was then called for the 2015 Algarve Cup. In May 2015, she was nominated as the youngest Norwegian player for the 2015 FIFA Women's World Cup.

On 19 June 2023, she was included in the 23-player Norwegian squad for the 2023 FIFA Women's World Cup.

On 16 June 2025, Fiskerstrand was called up to the Norway squad for the UEFA Women's Euro 2025.
