= Kirsty Barton =

English footballer

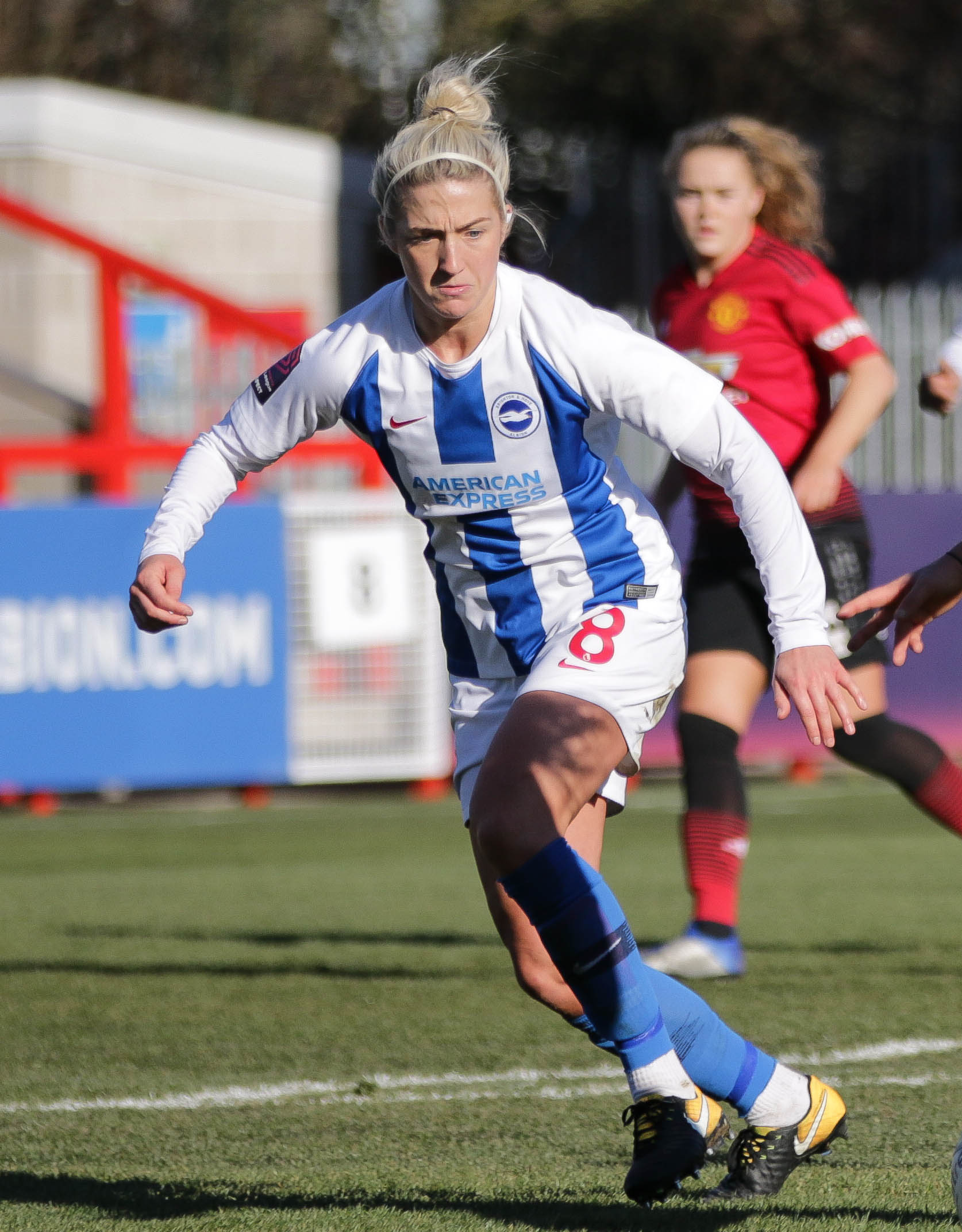
- Kirsty Barton playing for Brighton & Hove Albion in February 2019

Personal information
- Full name: Kirsty Barton
- Date of birth: 29 May 1992 (age 34)
- Place of birth: England
- Position: Midfielder

Youth career
- Chelsea

Senior career*
Years	Team	Apps	(Gls)
2008–2011	Chelsea	2	(0)
2011–2021	Brighton & Hove Albion	169	(15)
2021	→ Crystal Palace (loan)	10	(0)
2021–2023	Crystal Palace	26	(5)
2023	Lewes	12	(2)
- * Club domestic league appearances and goals as of 25 January 2023 ‡ National team caps and goals as of 6 October 2018

Kirsty Barton (born 29 May 1992) is an English football midfielder.

== Career ==
She began her youth career at Chelsea where she remained for seven years. She signed for Brighton & Hove Albion in 2011 and became the club's longest-serving player. Barton was instrumental in helping the Seagulls rise from the third tier of English women's football to their subsequent position in the FA WSL, England's top tier. In January 2023, Barton mutually terminated her contract with Crystal Palace.

Barton joined Lewes F.C. Women in January 2023.

Barton is now the Head of Girls' Football at Royal Russell School.

Barton married her former Brighton teammate Kayleigh Green in 2023.
