= Danique Kerkdijk =

Dutch footballer (born 1996)

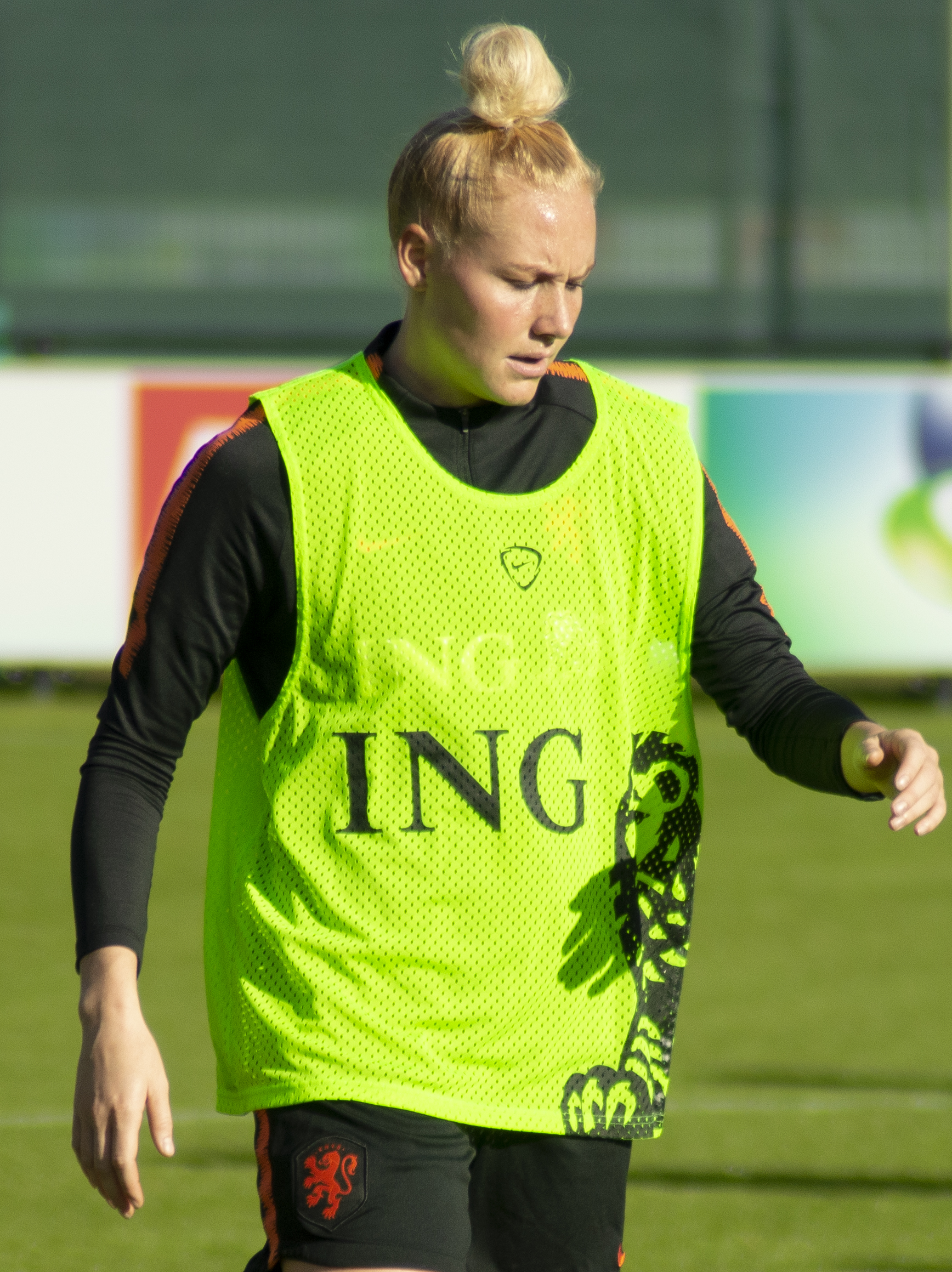
- Kerkdijk in 2018

Personal information
- Date of birth: 1 May 1996 (age 30)
- Place of birth: Olst, Netherlands
- Height: 1.73 m (5 ft 8 in)
- Position: Centre-back

Youth career
- SC Overwetering
- 2010–2013: Twente

Senior career*
Years	Team	Apps	(Gls)
2013–2017	Twente	88	(5)
2017–2019	Bristol City	37	(2)
2019–2022	Brighton & Hove Albion	53	(1)
2022–2024	Twente	19	(1)
Total		197	(9)

International career
2011	Netherlands U15	3	(0)
2014–2015	Netherlands U19	20	(0)
2015–2020	Netherlands	18	(0)
Medal record
Women's football
Representing the Netherlands
FIFA Women's World Cup
Runner-up	2019 France
UEFA Women's Under-19 Championship
Winner	2014 Norway
- * Club domestic league appearances and goals

Danique Kerkdijk (born 1 May 1996) is a Dutch former professional footballer who played as a defender.

== Club career ==
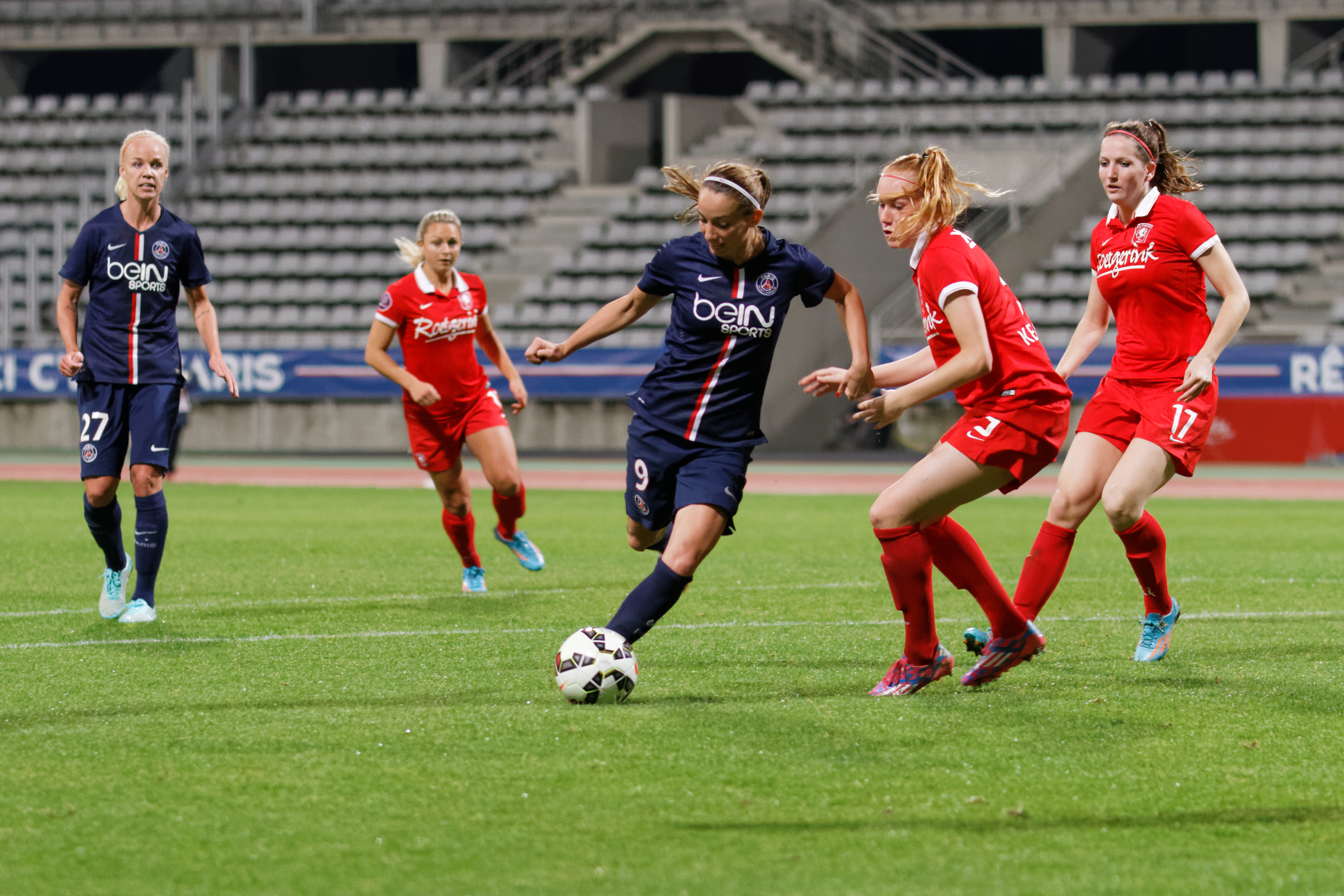
Kerkdijk playing for FC Twente in a match against Paris Saint-Germain at the 2014–15 UEFA Women's Champions League on 14 October 2014

Her career begins at the youth teams of amateur club SC Overwetering in Olst. During the 2009–10 season, she was part of a training group of under-14 age players, training at both SC Overwetering and FC Twente. A season later, she became a FC Twente youth player; by 2012 she reached the club first team (which plays in the BeNe League / Eredivisie). By 2013 she started playing matches regularly for the first team and in 2014 she signed her first professional contract with the club. Over the following years at the club she won many titles, played for them in 88 games and scored five times. Following the end of the 2016–17 season for FC Twente, she signed for Bristol City, who play in the English FA WSL 1 league. At the announcement she said: "I was really impressed at the club's vision for the future, I believe this is the best place for me to grow and develop as a player." She made her debut for the team in the 6–0 defeat against reigning champions Chelsea L.F.C. in September 2017. Kerkdijk expressed the hope that the increased level of training at Bristol compared to Twente would result in continued call ups for the national team.

On 1 June 2019 Danique signed for WSL side Brighton & Hove Albion.

After five years in England she returned to the Netherlands to play for Twente again.

== International career ==
Kerkdijk progressed through the Netherlands national team youth system, she won the 2014 UEFA Women's Under-19 Championship, before arriving at the senior team.

She debuted for the senior team on 17 September 2015, in an 8–0 friendly win over Belarus.

In April 2015, it was announced that Kerkdijk was one of seven FC Twente players named for the initial Dutch team for the 2015 FIFA Women's World Cup. She was cut from the squad when it was reduced from 35 to 23 players in the following month.

== Honours ==
=== FC Twente ===
- BeNe League: 2012–13, 2013–14
- Eredivisie: 2013–14*, 2014–15*, 2015–16
- KNVB Women's Cup: 2014–15

*During the BeNe League period (2012 to 2015), the highest placed Dutch team is considered as national champion by the Royal Dutch Football Association.

=== Netherlands U19 ===
- UEFA Women's Under-19 Championship: 2014

=== Netherlands ===
- FIFA Women's World Cup runner-up: 2019
- Algarve Cup: 2018
