= 2017 Yeovil Town L.F.C. season =

Yeovil Town Ladies
2017 season
- Chairman: Stephen Allison
- Manager: Jamie Sherwood
- Stadium: Huish Park
- FA WSL 1: 9th
- FA Women's Cup: Fifth round
- Top goalscorer: League: Lucy Quinn, Sarah Wiltshire (2); All: Lucy Quinn (3)
- Highest home attendance: 1,897 (23 April vs. Liverpool, WSL 1)
- Lowest home attendance: 312 (3 May vs. Bristol City, WSL 1)
- Average home league attendance: 744
Home colours	Away colours

The 2017 season was Yeovil Town Ladies Football Club's 27th season of competitive football and its first season in the FA WSL 1, at the top level of English women's football, after promotion from the FA WSL 2.

Following a reorganisation of top-level women's football in England, the 2017 season covered only half of a traditional season's length, while the FA WSL shifted its calendar to match the traditional autumn-to-spring axis of football in Europe. For the same reason, there was no Champions League qualification nor relegation to be competed for.

Yeovil struggled in their first season in the top flight of English football losing seven of their eight league matches, only avoiding defeat in their final match of the season as the club finished bottom of the FA WSL 1 table. The club were knocked out in the fifth round of the FA Women's Cup by Notts County. Forward Lucy Quinn finished as the club's top goalscorer with three goals in all competitions, while Quinn and returning striker Sarah Wiltshire were joint top goalscorers in the league with two goals each.

== Background ==
The 2016 season saw Yeovil compete in the second tier of English football. It was manager Jamie Sherwood's second full season in charge of the Glovers as the club won promotion from the FA WSL 2 as champions.

Ahead of their first season in the top flight of English women's football, the club released a number of players including Samantha Quayle who joined Portsmouth, young players Emily Donovan and Ellis Hillman, while Welsh international Kayleigh Green moved to Italy to join Serie A club Chieti Calcio Femminile. Finally, in February the club announced that defender Lauren Townsend and midfielder Danielle Carlton would both not be returning for the Spring Series. The club also announced that due to pitch renovation works at Huish Park, Yeovil would only play the first of their Spring Series matches at Huish Park, with the rest of their matches taking place at the home grounds of Taunton Town and Bridgwater Town.

== Review ==
=== Pre-season ===
On 8 February, Yeovil announced their first signing of the season with Welsh international record goalscorer Helen Ward joining from Reading, the club also announced the return of former captain Natalie Haigh for the Spring Series, after a year out of football due work and studying commitments. At the start of March, Yeovil Ladies announced a series of new contracts including club captain Ellie Curson, Welsh internationals Nicola Cousins, and midfielder Helen Bleazard, as well as experienced striker Ann-Marie Heatherson had all signed new deals for the Spring Series. On 16 March, the club also confirmed that a further five players had signed new contracts for the Spring Series, including Welsh international forward Nadia Lawrence, England under-19 goalkeeper Charlotte Haynes, as well as young trio Jessie Jones, Kelly Snook and Leah Burridge. On 17 March, Yeovil announced a further three contract renewals with midfielder Stephanie Williams, forward Lucy Quinn and defender Hannah Short for the upcoming season. The club also confirmed that former Reading player and Welsh dual-sport international Nia Jones had signed for the Spring Series.

On 19 March, Yeovil traveled to Notts County in the fifth round of the FA Women's Cup but were knocked out 3–2 despite goals from Lucy Quinn and Kelly Snook. After losing in the FA Cup, goalkeeper Charlotte Johnson left the club ahead of moving to study at the University of North Alabama. On 24 March, Helen Ward announced that she was pregnant and expecting her second child and therefore would have to withdraw from her Yeovil contract. The end of March, saw the club announce their fourth signing ahead of the Spring Series with England Beach Soccer player Molly Clark signing from Chichester City.

=== April ===
Ahead of the start of the Spring Series, Yeovil confirmed the return of striker Sarah Wiltshire having giving birth to her first child in February, after a loan spell proving her fitness scoring six times in seven appearances for Cambridge United. Yeovil's first match of the season saw them host Liverpool at Huish Park, in front of a record crowd of 1,897 the Glovers lost 4–1 with Wiltshire grabbing a consolation goal from the penalty spot. On 30 April, Yeovil traveled to Chelsea for their second WSL 1 fixture, despite holding on for 45 minutes without conceding the Glovers conceded twice in first half injury time and eventually fell to a 6–0 defeat.

=== May ===
During the Chelsea defeat, Yeovil goalkeeper Charlotte Haynes suffered a broken hand which ruled her out for up to eight weeks. Following the confirmation of Haynes' injury, Yeovil moved quickly to sign former Notts County goalkeeper Megan Walsh for the remainder of the Spring Series. On 3 May, Yeovil faced Bristol City at the home of Taunton Town but fell to a third successive WSL defeat after a late Nicola Cousins own goal, despite goals from Ann-Marie Heatherson and Sarah Wiltshire. Yeovil then hosted Arsenal at Taunton Town, on 7 May, and conceded four goals in just over half an hour despite the Glovers replying with a consolation goal from Lucy Quinn, Yeovil lost their fourth match of the Spring Series 5–1. On 16 May, Yeovil completed the signing of Welsh international former Notts County midfielder Angharad James for the remainder of the Spring Series. James made her debut for Yeovil the following day against Reading as the Glovers suffered a narrow 1–0 defeat. Yeovil then traveled to defending WSL 1 champions Manchester City, and suffered another heavy defeat losing 5–1 with Quinn scoring her third goal of the season. Before Yeovil's penultimate game of the Spring Series, the club confirmed that goalkeeper Bethany-May Howard had returned to the club after graduating from Rider University in the United States. On 28 May, Yeovil's final home game of the Spring Series saw them fall to a narrow 2–1 defeat against Sunderland with Angharad James scoring the Glovers goal. Yeovil's final Spring Series match saw them travel to Birmingham City as the Glovers ended the season with a goalless draw to gain the club's first FA WSL 1 point.

== Transfers ==
=== In ===
Date	Name	From	Fee	Ref
8 February 2017	Helen Ward	Reading	Free (released)	
21 February 2017	Natalie Haigh	Unattached	Free (released)	
19 March 2017	Nia Jones	Reading	Free (released)	
29 March 2017	Molly Clark	Chichester City	Free	
3 May 2017	Megan Walsh	Notts County	Free (released)	
16 May 2017	Angharad James	Notts County	Free (released)	
24 May 2017	Bethany-May Howard	Rider Broncs	Free	

=== Out ===
Date	Name	To	Fee	Ref
20 March 2017	Charlotte Johnson	North Alabama Lions	Released	
24 March 2017	Helen Ward	Watford	Contract terminated by mutual consent	
11 July 2017	Sarah Wiltshire	Tottenham Hotspur	Released	
24 July 2017	Angharad James	Everton	Released	
13 August 2017	Molly Clark	Portsmouth	Released	
15 August 2017	Natalie Haigh	Coventry United	Released	
15 August 2017	Charlotte Haynes	Keynsham Town	Released	
15 August 2017	Nia Jones	Unattached	Released	
15 August 2017	Hannah Short	Oxford United	Released	
15 August 2017	Stephanie Williams	Oxford United	Released	

=== Loan out ===
Date	Name	To	End date	Ref
12 March 2017	Sarah Wiltshire	Cambridge United	23 April 2017	

== Match details ==
=== WSL 1 ===
Date	League position	Opponents	Venue	Result	Score F–A	Scorers	Attendance	Ref
23 April 2017	9th	Liverpool	H	L	1–4	Wiltshire (pen)	1,897	
30 April 2017	9th	Chelsea	A	L	0–6		1,077	
3 May 2017	9th	Bristol City	H^{[A]}	L	2–3	Heatherson, Wiltshire	312	
7 May 2017	9th	Arsenal	H^{[A]}	L	1–5	Quinn	824	
17 May 2017	9th	Reading	H^{[A]}	L	0–1		356	
21 May 2017	9th	Manchester City	A	L	1–5	Quinn	1,153	
28 May 2017	9th	Sunderland	H^{[B]}	L	1–2	James	331	
31 May 2017	9th	Birmingham City	A	D	0–0		625	

==== League table ====
Pos	Team	Pld	W	D	L	GF	GA	GD	Pts
5	Sunderland	8	2	3	3	4	14	−10	9
6	Reading	8	2	2	4	10	15	−5	8
7	Birmingham City	8	1	4	3	6	10	−4	7
8	Bristol City	8	1	1	6	5	21	−16	4
9	Yeovil Town	8	0	1	7	6	26	−20	1

Updated to match(es) played on 3 June 2017. Source:
Rules for classification: 1) Points; 2) Goal difference; 3) Number of goals scored

=== FA Women's Cup ===
Round	Date	Opponents	Venue	Result	Score F–A	Scorers	Attendance	Ref
Fifth round	19 March 2017	Notts County	A	L	2–3	Quinn (pen), Snook	443	

== Squad statistics ==
No.	Pos.	Nat.	Name	Apps	Goals	Apps	Goals	Apps	Goals
No.	Pos.	Nat.	Name	League		FA Women's Cup		Total	
1	GK	ENG	Charlotte Haynes	2	0	1	0	3	0
1	GK	ENG	Bethany-May Howard	0	0	0	0	0	0
2	DF	ENG	Natalie Haigh	5 (1)	0	1	0	6 (1)	0
3	DF	ENG	Leah Burridge	0 (1)	0	0	0	0 (1)	0
4	MF	WAL	Ellie Curson	8	0	1	0	9	0
5	DF	WAL	Nicola Cousins	8	0	0	0	8	0
6	MF	WAL	Stephanie Williams	0 (2)	0	1	0	1 (2)	0
7	FW	WAL	Sarah Wiltshire	3 (3)	2	0	0	3 (3)	2
8	MF	ENG	Jessie Jones	1 (5)	0	0	0	1 (5)	0
9	FW	ENG	Ann-Marie Heatherson	8	1	1	0	9	1
10	FW	WAL	Nia Jones	7 (1)	0	1	0	8 (1)	0
11	FW	WAL	Nadia Lawrence	8	0	1	0	9	0
~~13~~ †	GK	ENG	Charlotte Johnson	0	0	0 (1)	0	0 (1)	0
13	GK	ENG	Megan Walsh	6	0	0	0	6	0
15	DF	ENG	Kelly Snook	1 (3)	0	1	1	2 (3)	1
16	MF	ENG	Bow Jackson	2	0	0 (1)	0	2 (1)	0
20	MF	ENG	Molly Clark	2 (1)	0	0	0	2 (1)	0
21	FW	ENG	Lucy Quinn	7 (1)	2	1	1	8 (1)	3
23	MF	WAL	Helen Bleazard	8	0	1	0	9	0
25	MF	WAL	Angharad James	3 (1)	1	0	0	3 (1)	1
26	DF	ENG	Hannah Short	8	0	1	0	9	0
28	FW	ENG	Ella Pusey	0 (5)	0	0 (1)	0	0 (6)	0

== Footnotes ==
A. Yeovil Ladies played three of their home matches at The Viridor Stadium, home of Taunton Town.
B. Yeovil Ladies played Sunderland at Fairfax Park, home of Bridgwater Town.
