= 2025–26 Women's FA Cup =

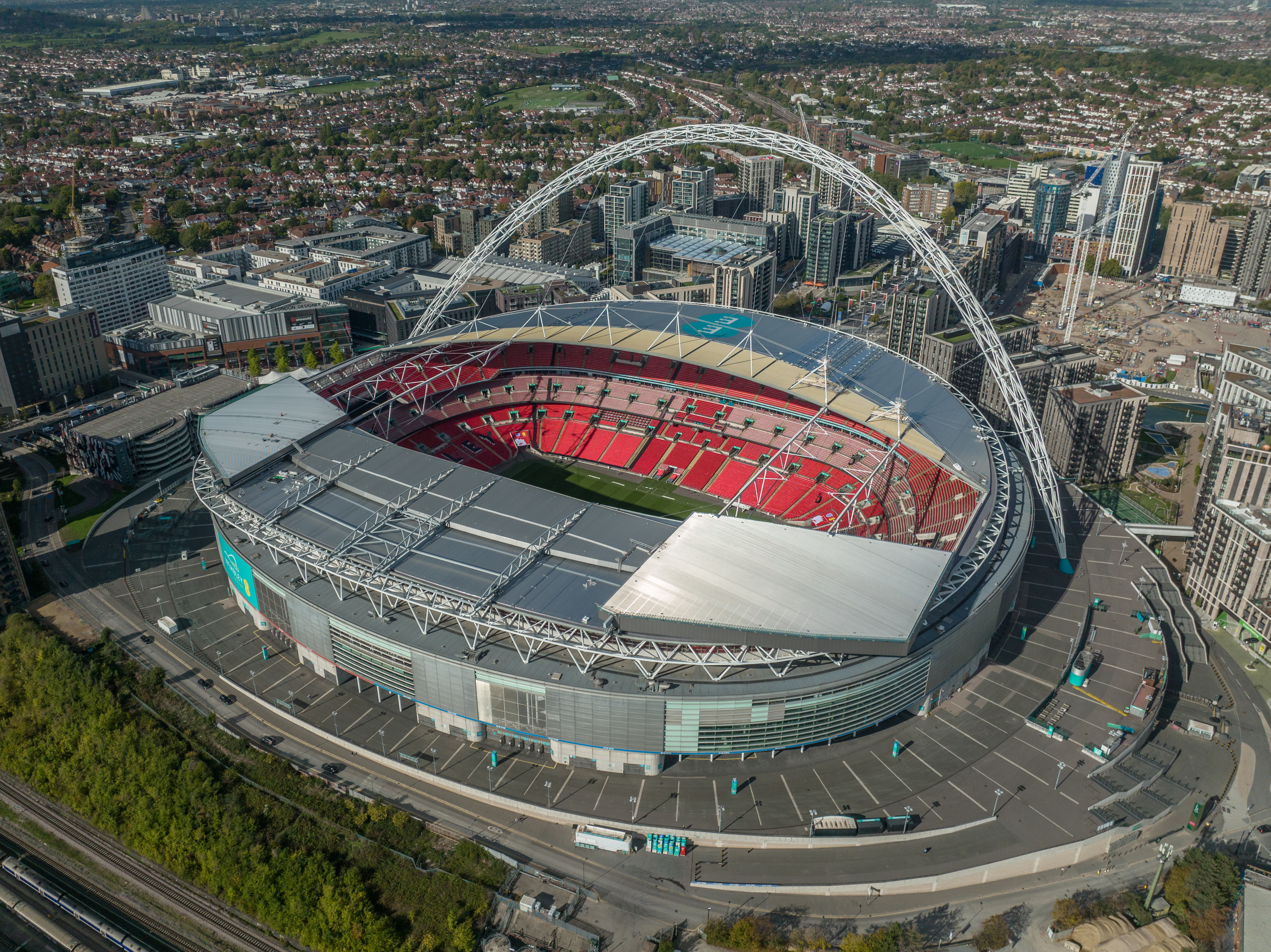
- Wembley Stadium will host the final on 31 May 2026

Tournament details
- Country: England; Wales
- Dates: 24 August 2025 – 31 May 2026
- Teams: 538

Final positions
- Champions: Manchester City (4th title)
- Runners-up: Brighton & Hove Albion

Tournament statistics
- Matches played: 505
- Goals scored: 2,619 (5.19 per match)
- All statistics correct as of 18 January 2026.

The 2025–26 Women's FA Cup was the 56th staging of the Women's FA Cup, a knockout cup competition for women's football teams in England. Chelsea were the defending champions, having beaten Manchester United 3–0 in the 2025 final on 18 May 2025. They were eliminated by Manchester City in the semi-finals. Manchester City won their fourth title, defeating Brighton & Hove Albion 4–0 in the final.

== Teams ==
A total of 538 teams were accepted into the 2025–26 Women's FA Cup, an increase of 24 from the previous year. A preliminary round was introduced with 190 tier 7 teams competing, and 159 tier 6 regional first division teams given an exemption until the first qualifying round. 93 tier 5 teams were given an exemption until the second round qualifying stage. The 48 teams that play in the FA Women's National League Division One (tier 4) were given exemption until third round qualifying. Teams in the Northern and Southern Premier Divisions (tier 3) entered at the first round proper, and the 12 Women's Super League 2 teams (tier 2) entered at the third round proper. The final teams to enter the competition, the 12 Women's Super League teams (tier 1), entered at the fourth round.

Round	Clubs remaining	Clubs involved	Winners from previous round	Games played	Goals scored	Prize money	
Round	Clubs remaining	Clubs involved	Winners from previous round	Games played	Goals scored	Winner	Loser
Preliminary round	538	46	–	19	94	£600	£150
First round qualifying	515	326 (Note: 159 Tier 6 regional first division teams added)	23	154	887	£1,800	£450
Second round qualifying	352	256 (Note: 93 Tier 5 regional premier division teams added)	163	124	654	£3,000	£750
Third round qualifying	224	176 (Note: 48 FA Women's National League Division One teams added)	128	88	478	£4,000	£1,000
First round	136	112 (Note: 24 FA Women's National League Premier Division teams added)	88	56	248	£6,000	£1,500
Second round	80	56	56	28	106	£8,000	£2,000
Third round	52	40 (Note: 12 Women's Super League 2 teams added)	28	20	83	£35,000	£9,000
Fourth round	32	32 (Note: 12 Women's Super League teams added)	20	16	69	£54,000	£13,000
Fifth round	16	16	16	8	29	£80,000	£20,000
Quarter-final	8	8	8	4	7	£90,000	£22,500
Semi-final	4	4	4	2		£160,000	£40,000
Final	2	2	2	1		£430,000	£108,000

== Preliminary round ==
The competition started at the preliminary round with games played on 24 August 2025, and made up of 46 teams from the seventh-tier county division football leagues.

Tie	Home team (tier)	Score	Away team (tier)	Att.
1	Darlington (7)	4–0	Heaton Hawks (7)	
2	Carlisle United (7)	2–0	GT7 (7)	
3	Whitehaven (7)	2–2 (3–2 p)	West Allotment Celtic (7)	
4	Gateshead Leam Rangers (7)	H–W	Gateshead (7)	
Gateshead withdrew.
5	Stocksbridge Park Steels (7)	8–0	Cherry Burton (7)	72
6	Oughtibridge War Memorial (7)	H–W	Grimsby Borough (7)	
Grimsby Borough withdrew.
7	Witton Albion (7)	H–W	Skipton Town (7)	
Skipton Town withdrew.
8	Maghull (7)	2–0	Southport (7)	
9	Harpole (7)	1–2	Boston Town (7)	
10	Higham Town (7)	4–1	Matlock Town (7)	
11	Kirby Muxloe (7)	1–1 (3–2 p)	Birstall United (7)	

Tie	Home team (tier)	Score	Away team (tier)	Att.
12	Allscott Heath (7)	0–3	Broseley (7)	
13	Aylsham (7)	1–6	Ramsey & Mistley (7)	
14	Sprowston (7)	H–W	King’s Lynn Town (7)	
King’s Lynn Town withdrew.
15	Islington Borough (7)	0–4	London Academicals (7)	
16	AFC Welwyn (7)	2–0	Garston (7)	
17	Tonbridge Angels (7)	0–0 (5–3 p)	AFC Croydon Athletic (7)	
18	Marlborough Town (7)	2–2 (2–4 p)	Yateley United (7)	
19	Millbrook (7)	7–1	Horsham (7)	
20	Pen Mill (7)	0–8	Ridgeway (7)	
21	Bristol Brunel (7)	10–0	Iron Acton (7)	
22	St Agnes (7)	16–1	Kilkhampton (7)	75
23	Signal Box Oak Villa (7)	0–1	Bradworthy (7)	

== First round qualifying ==
The draw for the first round qualifying took place on 20 August 2025 and included the introduction of 160 teams from the sixth-tier regional first division football leagues. 162 matches of the first round qualifying were played on 7 September 2025, with one abandoned fixture played the following week.

Tie	Home team (tier)	Score	Away team (tier)	Att.
1	Washington (6)	7–1	Guisborough Town (7)	157
2	Northallerton Town (7)	1–2	Carlisle United (7)	139
3	Whitehaven (7)	0–1	Redcar Town (6)	
4	i2i International (6)	5–2	Boldon CA (7)	
5	Cramlington United (7)	1–2	Hartlepool United (6)	
6	CLS Amazons (7)	A–W	Gateshead Rutherford (6)	
CLS Amazons withdrew.
7	Penrith (6)	15–0	Boro Rangers (7)	
8	Birtley Town (6)	2–0	Knaresborough Town (7)	
9	Bishop Auckland (7)	0–17	Park View (6)	
10	Gateshead Leam Rangers (7)	5–2	Harrogate Railway (7)	
11	Hebburn Town (7)	0–2	Darlington (7)	
12	Wigginton Grasshoppers (7)	3–0	Consett (6)	
13	Hartlepool Pools Youth (6)	2–8	Stockton Town (6)	
14	Handsworth (6)	9–0	Beverley Town (7)	
15	Rossington Main (6)	2–1	Oughtibridge War Memorial (7)	
16	Lower Hopton (6)	3–0	AFC Preston (7)	
17	North Ferriby (7)	1–5	Grimsby Town (6)	
18	Kiveton Park (7)	1–6	Elloughton Blackburn (7)	60
19	Wyke Wanderers (7)	6–2	Dinnington Town (7)	
20	Chesterfield (6)	3–1	Leeds Medics & Dentists (7)	20
21	Sherburn White Rose (7)	7–1	Sheffield United Community Foundation (7)	
22	Bottesford Town (7)	0–2	Leeds Modernians (6)	
23	Ilkley Town (6)	19–1	Brigg Town (7)	
24	FC Farsley (7)	7–0	AFC Tickton (7)	
25	Chanterlands (7)	1–10	Dronfield Town (6)	
26	Stocksbridge Park Steels (7)	2–1	Cleethorpes Town (6)	61
27	Sheffield Wednesday (6)	5–0	Forge Way (7)	
28	Inglemire (7)	2–4	Millmoor Juniors (6)	120
29	Wirral Phoenix (6)	5–0	Blackburn Eagles (7)	
30	Nantwich Town (6)	5–1	Lymm Rovers (7)	
31	Colne (7)	5–1	Radcliffe (6)	
32	Runcorn Linnets (6)	5–4	Pilkington (6)	119
33	Mossley Hill (6)	1–3	Chester (6)	
34	Morecambe (6)	7–1	AFC Crewe (6)	
35	Witton Albion (7)	0–5	Ashton Town (6)	99
36	Rochdale (6)	3–2	MSB Woolton (6)	
37	Winton Wanderers (7)	2–3	Marine (7)	
38	Altrincham (6)	6–3	Macclesfield (6)	321
39	Wigan Athletic Girls & Ladies (6)	4–4 (4–3 p)	Warrington Town (6)	
40	Hyde United (7)	3–0	Penwortham Town (7)	
41	Maghull (7)	0–7	FC Northern (7)	
42	Preston North End (6)	5–0	Haslingden (6)	
43	Manchester Laces (6)	7–1	Northwich Victoria (7)	151
44	Litherland REMYCA (6)	A–W	FC St Helens (6)	
Litherland REMYCA withdrew.
45	Atherton LR (6)	2–1	Wirral United (7)	
46	Buxton (7)	0–10	Blackpool (6)	50
47	Accrington Stanley (6)	2–2 (5–4 p)	Salford City Lionesses (6)	
48	Brookside Athletic (7)	3–2	Long Eaton United (6)	
49	Allexton & New Parks (7)	3–1	Higham Town (7)	50
50	Basford United (6)	0–0 (4–3 p)	Arnold Eagles (6)	30
51	Sherwood (6)	1–2	River City (6)	
52	Newark Town (6)	0–3	Netherton United (6)	
53	Sleaford Town (6)	A–W	Stanground Cardea Sports (6)	
Sleaford Town withdrew.
54	Spalding United (7)	6–0	Crick Athletic (7)	
55	Pride Park (7)	1–4	Nottingham Trent University (6)	
56	Boston Town (7)	1–10	University of Nottingham (6)	
57	Boston United (7)	0–8	Thurmaston DPC Vixens (7)	
58	Kirby Muxloe (7)	2–2 (4–1 p)	Thrapston Town (6)	
59	Amber Valley (7)	0–5	Melbourne Dynamos (6)	
60	Moulton (7)	H–W	Beaumont Park (6)	
Beaumont Park withdrew.
61	Bugbrooke St Michaels (7)	2–3	Dunton & Broughton United (6)	
62	Long Buckby (7)	A–W	Corby Town (7)	
Long Buckby withdrew.
63	West Bridgford Colts (6)	0–2	Coalville Town (6)	
64	Belper Town (6)	27–0	AFC Minster (7)	
65	Leicester City Ladies (6)	1–2	Asfordby Amateurs (6)	100
66	Albrighton (7)	2–1	Nunnery Wood United (7)	
67	Ludlow Town (7)	2–8	Shrewsbury Up & Comers (7)	
68	Droitwich Spa (6)	H–W	Walsall Wood (6)	
Walsall Wood withdrew.
69	Bromsgrove Sporting (6)	4–1	Kingfisher (6)	
70	Rugby Town (6)	1–0	Newcastle Town (6)	
71	SJB (7)	0–8	Broseley (7)	
72	Milton United (Staffordshire) (7)	7–0	Inkberrow (7)	
73	Solihull Sporting (6)	A–W	Crusaders (6)	
Solihull Sporting (6) withdrew.
74	Redditch United (6)	9–0	Dudley Town (7)	
75	Lichfield City (6)	11–0	Worthen Juniors (7)	
76	Halesowen Town (6)	5–2	Stone Old Alleynians (7)	
77	Whitchurch Alport (6)	1–2	Walsall (6)	
78	Coton Green (7)	3–0	Long Itchington (6)	65
79	Knowle (6)	1–4	Chasetown (6)	116
80	Coventry City (7)	0–3	AFC Telford United (6)	

Tie	Home team (tier)	Score	Away team (tier)	Att.
81	Telford Town (6)	0–0 (1–3 p)	Shawbury United (7)	
82	Colchester United (6)	5–0	Cambridge Rangers (7)	
83	Stowupland Falcons (7)	1–5	Mulbarton Wanderers (6)	75
84	Costessey Sports (7)	4–3	Brightlingsea Regent (7)	
85	Bacton United 89 (7)	0–8	Cambridge City (6)	70
86	Needham Market (6)	2–0	Newmarket Town (6)	
87	Brantham Athletic (6)	3–0	Wimblington (7)	
88	Sprowston (7)	0–3	Histon (6)	
89	Fulbourn Bluebirds (6)	4–1	Waterbeach Colts (7)	
90	Ramsey & Mistley (7)	2–0	Soham Town Rangers (7)	
91	Thetford Town (6)	4–2	Stanway Pegasus (6)	
92	Hertford Town (6)	6–0	Oaklands Wolves (7)	
93	Southend United (6)	2–1	AFC Welwyn (7)	86
94	Hackney (6)	4–0	Ampthill Town (7)	
95	Leigh Ramblers (7)	1–2	She Can Play Panthers (6)	
96	Berkhamsted (7)	3–0	Ware United (7)	
97	New Bradwell St Peter (6)	2–1	AFC Leyton (7)	
98	Newport Pagnell Town (6)	3–1	Biggleswade United (6)	203
99	Dunstable Town (6)	5–0	St Margaretsbury (7)	
100	Romford Town (7)	0–9	Clapton Community (6)	65
101	Camden Town (6)	1–0	Frontiers (7)	
102	Wormley Rovers (6)	11–0	Langford (7)	
103	Stotfold (7)	1–3	Toby (6)	
104	London Academicals (7)	2–4	Chelmsford City (6)	
105	Hitchin Belles (6)	0–13	Leyton Orient (7)	403
106	Wootton Blue Cross (7)	0–5	Colney Heath (6)	
107	Oxted & District (7)	1–5	Maidstone United (7)	
108	Cray Wanderers (7)	7–1	Margate (7)	
109	Eastbourne Town (7)	2–6	Hollands & Blair (7)	
110	South London (7)	3–1	Carshalton Athletic (7)	
111	Eastbourne Borough (6)	2–0	Hastings United (6)	
112	Comets (7)	1–1 (4–5 p)	AFC Greenwich Borough (6)	
113	Tunbridge Wells Foresters (7)	7–1	Ashmount Leigh (6)	
114	Tonbridge Angels (7)	7–0	Kings Hill (7)	58
115	Croydon (7)	1–1 (1–4 p)	Chislehurst Glebe (7)	
116	Merstham (7)	2–3	Tooting Bec (7)	
117	Richmond & Kew (6)	11–0	Epsom & Ewell (7)	55
118	Ashford United (6)	2–8	Bromley (6)	84
119	Soccer Elite Football Academy (6)	2–1	Herne Bay (6)	
120	Sevenoaks Town (6)	5–0	Bexhill United (6)	
121	Farnborough (6)	2–0	Brackley Town (6)	
122	Finchampstead (7)	7–0	Milton United (Berks & Bucks) (6)	
123	Ashridge Park (7)	10–0	Highworth Town (7)	
124	Kidlington Youth (6)	4–0	Ruislip Rangers (7)	
125	Denham United (6)	11–3	Barton United (7)	
126	Yateley United (7)	1–4	Wallingford & Crowmarsh (7)	307
127	Frimley Green (6)	0–2	Royal Wootton Bassett Town (6)	
128	Penn & Tylers Green (6)	15–0	Caversham United (7)	
129	Manorcroft United (7)	H–W	Tilehurst Panthers (6)	
Tilehurst Panthers withdrew.
130	AFC Stoneham (6)	16 – 0	Hassocks (7)	37
131	Broadbridge Heath (7)	0–2	Montpelier Villa (6)	
132	Havant & Waterlooville (6)	5–3	Bognor Regis Town (6)	
133	Three Bridges (7)	2–3	Millbrook (7)	
134	Haywards Heath Town (6)	A–W	Burgess Hill Town (7)	
Haywards Heath Town withdrew.
135	Basingstoke Town (7)	2–0	East Preston (7)	
136	Bursledon (6)	4–1	United Services Portsmouth (7)	
137	Steyning Town Community (6)	1–1 (5–4 p)	Shanklin (7)	
138	Pagham (7)	0–5	Andover New Street (6)	50
139	Nursling & Shirley (6)	0–9	Leatherhead (6)	
140	Farnham Town (6)	9–1	AFC Varsity (6)	
141	Frome Town (7)	0–4	Weymouth (6)	
142	Wells City (6)	1–6	Yeovil Town (6)	
143	Ridgeway (7)	H–W	AFC Totton (7)	
AFC Totton withdrew.
144	Bemerton Heath Harlequins (6)	4–2	Bournemouth Poppies (7)	
145	Shaftesbury (6)	3–1	Dorchester Town (7)	20
146	Cobham Sports (7)	1–2	Longfleet Lionesses (7)	
147	Bournemouth Manor (7)	0–3	Wimborne Town (6)	
148	Hereford (6)	2–1	Bath City (6)	92
149	Cheltenham Saracens (7)	0–1	Downend Flyers (6)	
150	Bishop’s Cleeve (7)	2–0	Cirencester Town (6)	
151	Paulton Rovers (6)	4–1	Olveston United (7)	
152	Hereford Pegasus (6)	2–3	Ross Juniors (7)	
153	Bristol Brunel (7)	4–0	Longlevens (7)	
154	Weston Super Mare (6)	2–3	Corsham Town (6)	
155	Mangotsfield United (6)	3–0	Bristol & West (7)	
156	Bitton (6)	1–1 (6–5 p)	Whitchurch (6)	
157	Stoke Gabriel & Torbay Police (7)	4–2	Teignmouth (7)	
158	Sticker (7)	9–1	Appledore (6)	36
159	St Agnes (7)	5–0	Honiton Town (7)	
160	Feniton (6)	3–0	Bradworthy (7)	68
161	Tiverton Town (7)	4–3	Redruth United (7)	
162	Bodmin (7)	1–1 (2–4 p)	Saltash Borough (7)	96
163	Plympton (7)	12–0	Bideford AFC (7)	43

== Second round qualifying ==
The draw for the second round qualifying took place on 8 September 2025 and included the introduction of 93 teams from the fifth-tier regional premier division football leagues. 120 matches were played on 21 September, with four rearranged fixtures played the following week.

Tie	Home team (tier)	Score	Away team (tier)	Att.
1	Birtley Town (6)	1–2	Spennymoor Town (5)	
2	Hartlepool United (6)	0–5	Gateshead Leam Rangers (7)	
3	Alnwick Town (5)	3–3 (3–4 p)	South Shields (5)	
4	Stockton Town (6)	4–3	Park View (6)	
5	Thornaby (5)	4–3	Sunderland West End (5)	
6	Gateshead Rutherford (6)	H–W	York RI (5)	
York RI withdrew.
7	Wallsend BC (5)	5–0	Wigginton Grasshoppers (7)	
8	i2i International (6)	3–0	Redcar Town (6)	
9	Washington (6)	0–1	Harrogate Town (5)	
10	Carlisle United (7)	0–5	Penrith (6)	
11	Darlington (7)	1–4	Ponteland United (5)	
12	Ilkley Town (6)	4–1	Gainsborough Trinity (5)	
13	Chesterfield Community (5)	0–2	Dronfield Town (6)	
14	Bradford City (5)	5–1	Chesterfield (6)	
15	Stocksbridge Park Steels (7)	3–3 (5–4 p)	FC Farsley (7)	78
16	Brunsmeer Athletic (5)	6–4	Rotherham United (5)	
17	Sherburn White Rose (7)	2–3	SJR Worksop (5)	
18	Handsworth (6)	5–0	Millmoor Juniors (6)	
19	Wyke Wanderers (7)	4–1	Elloughton Blackburn (7)	
20	Lower Hopton (6)	3–2	Rossington Main (6)	
21	Grimsby Town (6)	5–6	Leeds Modernians (6)	75
22	Sheffield Wednesday (6)	3–3 (3–4 p)	Ossett United (5)	100
23	Marine (7)	0–6	AFC Fylde (5)	122
24	West Didsbury & Chorlton (5)	8–1	Morecambe (6)	117
25	FC St Helens (6)	8–0	Hyde United (7)	
26	Darwen (5)	3–0	Bury (5)	167
27	Poulton Victoria (5)	2–2 (4–1 p)	Preston North End (6)	
28	Atherton LR (6)	2–3	Altrincham (6)	
29	Colne (7)	1–9	Fleetwood Town Wrens (5)	
30	Blackpool (6)	5–1	Wigan Athletic Girls & Ladies (6)	
31	Tranmere Rovers (5)	2–1	Ashton Town (6)	
32	Runcorn Linnets (6)	1–3	Crewe Alexandra (5)	
33	Wirral Phoenix (6)	4–2	FC Northern (7)	
34	Rochdale (6)	0–4	Accrington Stanley (6)	
35	Mancunian Unity (5)	4–0	Curzon Ashton (5)	
36	Manchester Laces (6)	3–3 (p)	FC United of Manchester (5)	
37	Bolton Wanderers (5)	5–0	Chester (6)	
38	Wellingborough Town (5)	1–1 (2–4 p)	River City (6)	
39	Asfordby Amateurs (6)	3–2	Dunton & Broughton United (6)	
40	Stanground Cardea Sports (6)	H–W	Lincoln City (5)	
Lincoln City withdrew.
41	Stamford (5)	1–4	Brookside Athletic (7)	
42	Coalville Town (6)	2–2 (4–5 p)	Thurmaston DPC Vixens (7)	
43	Mansfield Town (5)	7–1	Corby Town (7)	
44	Allexton & New Parks (7)	2–2 (2–4 p)	Basford United (6)	
45	Loughborough Foxes Vixens (5)	1–0	Nottingham Trent University (6)	55
46	Spalding United (7)	7–2	Anstey Nomads (5)	
47	Belper Town (6)	1–9	University of Nottingham (6)	
48	Netherton United (6)	7–1	Kirby Muxloe (7)	
49	Moulton (7)	1–5	Melbourne Dynamos (6)	30
50	Milton United (Staffordshire) (7)	0–3	Coventry Sphinx (5)	
51	Hednesford Town (5)	7–1	Bromsgrove Sporting (6)	139
52	Chasetown (6)	1–1 (3–4 p)	Lichfield City (6)	
53	Shifnal Town (5)	1–2	Solihull Moors (5)	
54	Burton Albion (5)	2–2 (3–4 p)	Walsall (6)	
55	AFC Telford United (6)	1–3	Crusaders (6)	
56	Albrighton (7)	0–8	Shrewsbury Town (5)	
57	Shawbury United (7)	0–4	Redditch United (6)	
58	Coundon Court (5)	7–1	Rugby Town (6)	
59	Shrewsbury Up & Comers (7)	0–6	Alvechurch (5)	
60	Nantwich Town (6)	6–1	Halesowen Town (6)	
61	Broseley (7)	1–7	Hereford (6)	
62	Redditch Borough (5)	5–3	Leek Town (5)	
63	Coton Green (7)	1–2	Port Vale (5)	
64	Lye Town (5)	6–1	Droitwich Spa (6)	

Tie	Home team (tier)	Score	Away team (tier)	Att.
65	Southend United (6)	1–12	Athletico London (5)	
66	Hertford Town (6)	0–5	Chelmsford City (6)	
67	She Can Play Panthers (6)	0–2	Wroxham (5)	
68	Costessey Sports (7)	0–2	Wormley Rovers (6)	85
69	Bowers & Pitsea (5)	4–2	Hackney (6)	
70	Enfield Town (5)	1–2	Colchester United (6)	160
71	Barking (5)	9–0	Cambridge City (6)	
72	Hutton (5)	5–0	Fulbourn Bluebirds (6)	50
73	Histon (6)	0–1	Clapton Community (6)	
74	Brantham Athletic (6)	1–5	Ramsey & Mistley (7)	
75	Toby (6)	1–3	Needham Market (6)	
76	Thetford Town (6)	0–7	Haringey Borough (5)	
77	Dussindale & Hellesdon (5)	1–5	Leyton Orient (7)	50
78	Royston Town (5)	6–0	Mulbarton Wanderers (6)	60
79	Chislehurst Glebe (7)	0–6	Millwall Lionesses (5)	
80	Camden Town (6)	5–0	Soccer Elite Football Academy (6)	87
81	Burgess Hill Town (7)	0–9	Sutton United (5)	
82	Maidstone United (7)	5–1	Richmond & Kew (6)	
83	Aylesford (5)	1–2	Leatherhead (6)	50
84	Sport London e Benfica (5)	1–3	Newhaven (5)	
85	Ashford Town (Middx) (5)	4–3	Cray Wanderers (7)	42
86	Dartford (5)	4–1	AFC Greenwich Borough (6)	
87	Eastbourne Borough (6)	4–1	Tooting Bec (7)	
88	South London (7)	8–0	Tunbridge Wells Foresters (7)	
89	Bromley (6)	12–1	Hollands & Blair (7)	433
90	Tonbridge Angels (7)	0–2	Brentford (5)	120
91	Dorking Wanderers (5)	4–1	Sevenoaks Town (6)	
92	Ebbsfleet United (5)	0–13	Saltdean United (5)	
93	Manorcroft United (7)	0–5	Reading (5)	
94	Denham United (6)	1–0	New Bradwell St Peter (6)	120
95	St Albans City (5)	1–1 (5–6 p)	Beaconsfield Town (5)	
96	Colney Heath (6)	2–0	Berkhamsted (7)	137
97	Harpenden Town (5)	8–1	Woodley United (5)	66
98	Wallingford & Crowmarsh (7)	1–10	Wycombe Wanderers (5)	
99	Watford Ladies Development (5)	1–2	Dunstable Town (6)	
100	Kidlington Youth (6)	2–3	Ashridge Park (7)	
101	Farnborough (6)	2–3	Oxford City (5)	
102	Finchampstead (7)	1–3	Penn & Tylers Green (6)	
103	Newport Pagnell Town (6)	0–6	Stevenage (5)	
104	Badshot Lea (5)	5–0	Basingstoke Town (7)	
105	Fleet Town (5)	1–6	Farnham Town (6)	128
106	AFC Stoneham (6)	3–1	Bemerton Heath Harlequins (6)	
107	Southampton Women's (5)	3–0	Steyning Town Community (6)	86
108	Bursledon (6)	3–2	Andover New Street (6)	
109	Havant & Waterlooville (6)	2–3	AFC Portchester (5)	
110	Winchester City Flyers (5)	2–2 (5–4 p)	Sholing (5)	
111	Millbrook (7)	3–1	Montpelier Villa (6)	
112	Bitton (6)	6–0	Pucklechurch Sports (5)	
113	Bristol Brunel (7)	0–1	Royal Wootton Bassett Town (6)	
114	Mangotsfield United (6)	4–1	Frampton Rangers (5)	
115	Gloucester City (5)	6–0	Ross Juniors (7)	98
116	Bishop’s Cleeve (7)	1–3	Corsham Town (6)	
117	Forest Green Rovers (5)	6–1	Downend Flyers (6)	
118	Paulton Rovers (6)	1–6	AEK Boco (5)	
119	Wimborne Town (6)	1–1 (3–0 p)	Shaftesbury (6)	
120	Poole Town (5)	3–0	Ridgeway (7)	
121	Saltash United (5)	0–2	Yeovil Town (6)	
122	AFC St Austell (5)	A–W	Torquay United (5)	
AFC St Austell withdrew.
123	Plympton (7)	4–0	Longfleet Lionesses (7)	
124	Tiverton Town (7)	0–0 (4–2 p)	Bishops Lydeard (5)	
125	Ilminster Town (5)	A–W	Sticker (7)	
Ilminster Town withdrew.
126	Stoke Gabriel & Torbay Police (7)	0–2	Weymouth (6)	
127	Saltash Borough (7)	1–3	Feniton (6)	
128	St Agnes (7)	1–4	Sherborne Town (5)	

== Third round qualifying ==
The draw for the third round qualifying took place on 22 September 2025 and included the introduction of 48 teams from the fourth-tier FA Women's National League Division One. 87 matches were played on 5 October 2025, with one rearranged fixture played the following week.

Tie	Home team (tier)	Score	Away team (tier)	Att.
1	Norton & Stockton Ancients (4)	0–0 (4–5 p)	Leeds United (4)	
2	Bradford City (5)	0–3	i2i International (6)	
3	Lower Hopton (6)	1–10	Chester-le-Street Town (4)	
4	AFC Fylde (5)	7–2	Wirral Phoenix (6)	102
5	Chorley (4)	0–1	Cheadle Town Stingers (4)	105
6	Penrith (6)	3–1	Blackpool (6)	
7	Gateshead Rutherford (6)	1–5	Bolton Wanderers (5)	80
8	Darwen (5)	0–1	Leeds Modernians (6)	162
9	Huddersfield Town (4)	5–1	Spennymoor Town (5)	
10	Fleetwood Town Wrens (5)	1–4	South Shields (5)	
11	Stockton Town (6)	0–1	Altrincham (6)	
12	Crewe Alexandra (5)	2–0	Harrogate Town (5)	
13	Barnsley (4)	1–1 (0–3 p)	Mancunian Unity (5)	
14	Blackburn Rovers (4)	11–2	Stocksbridge Park Steels (7)	141
15	Accrington Stanley (6)	0–4	Durham Cestria (4)	
16	Thornaby (5)	1–2	FC St Helens (6)	
17	Ponteland United (5)	4–1	Nantwich Town (6)	
18	Stockport County (4)	8–1	Gateshead Leam Rangers (7)	102
19	Ossett United (5)	3–4	Manchester Laces (6)	
20	Wythenshawe (4)	7–0	Poulton Victoria (5)	
21	Ilkley Town (6)	1–2	Tranmere Rovers (5)	
22	Wyke Wanderers (7)	4–5	Wallsend BC (5)	
23	York City (4)	5–1	West Didsbury & Chorlton (5)	130
24	Coventry Sphinx (5)	2–2 (4–3 p)	Asfordby Amateurs (6)	
25	River City (6)	0–3	Port Vale (5)	
26	Kidderminster Harriers (4)	3–3 (5-4 p)	Shrewsbury Town (5)	
27	Stanground Cardea Sports (6)	1–3	Worcester City (4)	
28	Handsworth (6)	0–3	Northampton Town (4)	
29	Brookside Athletic (7)	1–9	SJR Worksop (5)	
30	Lichfield City (6)	0–1	Coundon Court (5)	40
31	Thurmaston DPC Vixens (7)	0–5	Mansfield Town (5)	
32	Hereford (6)	0–3	Hednesford Town (5)	103
33	Crusaders (6)	4–4 (2–3 p) (Note: Despite winning the game, Redditch United were expelled from the competition for fielding an ineligible player in the match, with Crusaders being declared the winners and reinstated.)	Redditch United (6)	
34	Brunsmeer Athletic (5)	3–4	University of Nottingham (6)	
35	Loughborough Foxes Vixens (5)	3–3 (3–5 p)	Redditch Borough (5)	47
36	Netherton United (6)	0–3	Dronfield Town (6)	
37	Spalding United (7)	0–11	Leafield Athletic (4)	
38	Walsall (6)	0–3	Lye Town (5)	
39	Sutton Coldfield Town (4)	4–3	Doncaster Rovers Belles (4)	58
40	Lincoln United (4)	3–2	Alvechurch (5)	
41	Basford United (6)	0–5	Solihull Moors (5)	57
42	Sheffield (4)	0–1	Boldmere St. Michaels (4)	61
43	Melbourne Dynamos (6)	2–5	Stourbridge (4)	
44	Peterborough United (4)	5–1	Notts County (4)	152

Tie	Home team (tier)	Score	Away team (tier)	Att.
45	Leyton Orient (7)	13–0	Needham Market (6)	34
46	AFC Sudbury (4)	9–0	Clapton Community (6)	
47	Milton Keynes Dons (4)	1–5	Luton Town (4)	131
48	Haringey Borough (5)	4–2	Harpenden Town (5)	
49	Norwich City (4)	4–0	Hutton (5)	225
50	Stevenage (5)	4–0	Chelmsford City (6)	110
51	Ramsey & Mistley (7)	0–7	Barking (5)	
52	Atlético London (5)	1–4	Cambridge United (4)	67
53	Wormley Rovers (6)	0–3	Royston Town (5)	
54	Bowers & Pitsea (5)	7–2	Colney Heath (6)	135
55	London Bees (4)	10–1	Colchester United (6)	83
56	Dunstable Town (6)	2–2 (4–5 p)	Wroxham (5)	
57	South London (7)	6–0	Ashridge Park (7)	
58	Leatherhead (6)	0–2	Dulwich Hamlet (4)	
59	Wycombe Wanderers (5)	4–2	Chesham United (4)	252
60	Maidstone United (7)	4–2	Badshot Lea (5)	235
61	Saltdean United (5)	6–0	Newhaven (5)	52
62	Camden Town (6)	0–2	Abingdon United (4)	
63	Bromley (6)	1–0	Dorking Wanderers (5)	93
64	Actonians (4)	2–0	Ascot United (4)	80
65	Reading (5)	1–2	Brentford (5)	
66	Sutton United (5)	5–2	Penn & Tylers Green (6)	
67	Beaconsfield Town (5)	0–6	Chatham Town (4)	
68	Ashford Town (Middx) (5)	1–7	Millwall Lionesses (5)	
69	Maidenhead United (4)	1–2	Worthing (4)	
70	Dartford (5)	1–1 (4–1 p)	Queens Park Rangers (4)	
71	Fulham (4)	4–0	Moneyfields (4)	
72	Farnham Town (6)	7–1	Eastbourne Borough (6)	
73	Oxford City (5)	3–3 (5–3 p)	Denham United (6)	458
74	Bridgwater United (4)	8–1	Bursledon (6)	
75	Feniton (6)	0–4	Wimborne Town (6)	
76	AFC Portchester (5)	19–0	Weymouth (6)	140
77	Winchester City Flyers (5)	1–0	Yeovil Town (6)	
78	AFC Stoneham (6)	0–2	Gloucester City (5)	
79	Torquay United (5)	3–2	Southampton Women's (5)	495
80	Millbrook (7)	3–0	Tiverton Town (7)	
81	Bournemouth Sports (4)	5–0	AEK Boco (5)	
82	Bristol Rovers (4)	6–1	Marine Academy Plymouth (4)	
83	Plympton (7)	0–8	Swindon Town (4)	42
84	Corsham Town (6)	1–0	Poole Town (5)	
85	Bitton (6)	1–5	Sherborne Town (5)	
86	Portishead Town (4)	5–0	Sticker (7)	
87	Royal Wootton Bassett Town (6)	1–3	Forest Green Rovers (5)	
88	Keynsham Town (4)	6–0	Mangotsfield United (6)	95

== First round proper ==
The draw for the first round proper took place on 6 October 2025 and included the introduction of 24 teams from the third-tier FA Women's National League Premier Division. 56 matches were played on 26 October 2025.

25 October 2025	Middlesbrough (3)	4–0	Cheadle Town Stingers (4)	Bishop Auckland
12:15	Ferguson 45+4' (pen.); Watt 55'; Robson 90'; Nelson 90+4'	Report		Stadium: Heritage Park; Attendance: 169

26 October 2025	Durham Cestria (4)	6–1	Dronfield Town (6)	Durham
14:00	Soulsby 39'; Collinson 46', 61'; Dale 83', 90'; Hutchinson 87'	Report	65'	Stadium: Maiden Castle Sports Centre; Attendance: 95

26 October 2025	Leeds United (4)	5–1	FC St Helens (6)	Garforth
14:00	Smith 21' (pen.); Sanderson 66', 90+5'; Gibrill-Keating 79'; Dixon 89'	Report	Griffiths 47'	Stadium: Bannister Prentice Stadium; Attendance: 180

26 October 2025	Huddersfield Town (4)	4–2	Wythenshawe (4)	Huddersfield
14:00	Biggins 2', 15'; Burgess 31', 40'	Report	Obida 64'; Gordon 68'	Stadium: Stafflex Arena; Attendance: 81

26 October 2025	Penrith (6)	2–3	Altrincham (6)	Penrith
14:00	Sinden 48'; Smith 76'	Report	McKnight; Jacobson; Saycell (pen.)	Stadium: Frenchfield Park; Attendance: 110

26 October 2025	Bolton Wanderers (5)	1–1 (2–4 p)	Ponteland United (5)	Chorley
14:00	Tweedle 6'	Report	Holmes 22'	Stadium: Victory Park; Attendance: 250
	Penalties
	Plano (penalty scored); Clark (penalty missed); Hardman (penalty scored); Limbert (penalty missed)		Penalty scored Penalty missed

26 October 2025	Burnley (3)	12–0	Blackburn Rovers (4)	Burnley
14:00	Wilkes 2'; Kelly 21'; Chadwick 24'; Ravening 44'; Walker 47', 85', 86'; Logan 56', 68'; Cairns 66'; Siddall 71'; Robinson 73'	Report		Stadium: Burnley FC Training Centre

26 October 2025	Stockport County (4)	3–0	Tranmere Rovers (5)	Woodley
14:00	Rathburn 12'; Cole 21'; Csomor 39'	Report		Stadium: Stockport Sports Village

26 October 2025	Liverpool Feds (3)	4–0	Chester-le-Street Town (4)	Walton
14:00	Anderson 23'; Fisher 65'; Collins 69'; Brady 90+1'	Report		Stadium: Walton Hall Park; Attendance: 203

26 October 2025	Manchester Laces (6)	1–3	Wallsend BC (5)	Wythenshawe
14:00	Goal	Report	Penman; Bowen; Holmes	Stadium: Ericstan Park

26 October 2025	Halifax (3)	1–4	Hull City (3)	Bradford
14:00	Shaw 6'	Report	Knight 63' (pen.); Haywood 66'; Hamill 70'; Akrill 90'	Stadium: Myra Shay

26 October 2025	York City (4)	1–0	Leeds Modernians (6)	Heslington
14:00	Astle 49'	Report		Stadium: York Sport Stadium; Attendance: 269

26 October 2025	South Shields (5)	0–5	AFC Fylde (5)	South Shields
14:00		Report	Kelsh 3', 59'; Moore 27'; Kelly 50'; Hindley 82'	Stadium: Harton & Westoe Miners Welfare Ground; Attendance: 150

26 October 2025	Mancunian Unity (5)	3–2	i2i International (6)	Chadderton
14:00	Goal	Report	Goal	Stadium: Emplas Commercial North Stadium

26 October 2025	Sporting Khalsa (3)	1–1 (4–3 p)	Loughborough Lightning (3)	Willenhall
14:00	Owen 33'	Report	Delglyn 17' (pen.)	Stadium: Guardian Warehousing Arena; Attendance: 80
	Penalties
	Harvey (penalty scored); Axten (penalty scored); Thompson-Moulding (penalty missed); Tweedie (penalty scored); Acton (penalty scored)		Delglyn (penalty missed); Wright (penalty missed); Higginbottom (penalty scored); Collyer (penalty scored); Greenwood (penalty scored)

26 October 2025	Hednesford Town (5)	2–1	SJR Worksop (5)	Hednesford
14:00	Onafowokan 54', 58'		Clarke 81'	Stadium: Keys Park

26 October 2025	Crewe Alexandra (5)	1–2	Boldmere St. Michaels (4)	Shavington
14:00	Edwards	Report	Goal	Stadium: Crewe Alex In The Community

26 October 2025	Wroxham (5)	3–0	Lye Town (5)	Wroxham
14:00	Fuller 6', 23'; Green 75'	Report		Stadium: Trafford Park; Attendance: 100

26 October 2025	Coventry Sphinx (5)	0–6	Derby County (3)	Coventry
14:00			Wildgoose 10'; Wilson 14'; Bryan 18'; Muir 52', 67'; Wheeler	Stadium: Cameron Slater Arena

26 October 2025	Lincoln United (4)	1–3	Stourbridge (4)	Lincoln
14:00	Bogg 50'	Report	Martin 67'; Deeley 78', 88'	Stadium: Ashby Avenue

26 October 2025	Northampton Town (4)	3–2	AFC Sudbury (4)	Northampton
14:00	Dade 64'; Webb 67'; Timms 77'	Report	Edwards 55'; Frazzoni 89'	Stadium: O'Riordan Bond Stadium; Attendance: 107

26 October 2025	Luton Town (4)	3–0	Mansfield Town (5)	Barton-le-Clay
14:00	O'Leary 33'; Maddix 34'; Makowska 90'	Report		Stadium: Sharpenhoe Road

26 October 2025	Royston Town (5)	1–0	Coundon Court (5)	Royston
14:00	Mills 28'	Report		Stadium: Garden Walk; Attendance: 196

26 October 2025	University of Nottingham (6)	1–2	Cambridge United (4)	Nottingham
14:00	Burnett 47'	Report	Jackson 30', 65'	Stadium: David Ross Sports Village

26 October 2025	Stoke City (3)	7–0	Sutton Coldfield Town (4)	Yarnfield
14:00	Kennerley 18', 20', 90', 90+2'; Stamps 28'; Molinari 40'; Wilson 79'	Report		Stadium: Wellbeing Park; Attendance: 89

26 October 2025	Port Vale (5)	1–2	Worcester City (4)	Stoke-on-Trent
14:00	Bailey 57'	Report	Edwards 36'; Springer 88'	Stadium: Emery's Stadium

26 October 2025	Peterborough United (4)	4–1	Real Bedford (3)	Peterborough
14:00	Rousseau 41', 49', 79'; Connor 81'	Report	Gaylor 45'	Stadium: Pims Park; Attendance: 313

26 October 2025	Wolverhampton Wanderers (3)	2–1	Rugby Borough (3)	Wellington
14:00	Sims 40'; Marshall 53'	Report	Camwell 84'	Stadium: SEAH Stadium; Attendance: 453

26 October 2025	Kidderminster Harriers (4)	1–0	Redditch Borough (5)	Droitwich Spa
14:00	Woolston 38'	Report		Stadium: King George V Ground

26 October 2025	AFC Wimbledon (3)	3–3 (2–4 p)	Chatham Town (4)	Wimbledon
14:00	McLachlan 20', 71'; Hincks 79'	Report	Jeffkins 38', 45+3'; Russ 86'	Stadium: Cherry Red Records Stadium; Attendance: 514
	Penalties
	Hincks (penalty scored); Buckingham (penalty missed); Mackenzie (penalty scored); Wallace (penalty missed)		Penalty scored

26 October 2025	Lewes (3)	4–0	Corsham Town (6)	Lewes
14:00	Carpenter 29'; Godfrey 33'; Priest; Lane	Report		Stadium: The Dripping Pan; Attendance: 455

26 October 2025	Winchester City Flyers (5)	0–4	Gwalia United (3)	Winchester
14:00		Report	Asker 13'; Sandford 73'; Pearce 90+1'; Collie 90+3'	Stadium: The Charters Community Stadium

26 October 2025	Haringey Borough (5)	0–3	Bristol Rovers (4)	Tottenham
14:00		Report	Jarvis 2'; Bassett 69'; Collis 90+5'	Stadium: Coles Park

26 October 2025	Actonians (4)	0–5	Watford (3)	Greenford
14:00		Report	Georgiou 4'; Fisher 30'; Ayisi 61' (pen.); Paul 72'; Haines 89'	Stadium: Berkeley Fields; Attendance: 124

26 October 2025	London Bees (4)	5–3	Barking (5)	Canons Park
14:00	Durn 14'; Lanza 40'; Isherwood 53', 84'; Fowle 81'	Report	31'; 37'; 52'	Stadium: The Hive Stadium; Attendance: 92

26 October 2025	Oxford City (5)	4–2	Sherborne Town (5)	Oxford
14:00	Edwards 3'; Parsons 20'; White 45+1'; Leach 90+5'	Report	Miller 21'; Harmer 76'	Stadium: The MGroup Stadium

26 October 2025	Millwall Lionesses (5)	0–2	Cheltenham Town (3)	Rotherhithe
14:00		Report	Bell 12'; Owen 48'	Stadium: St Paul's Sports Ground; Attendance: 130

26 October 2025	Worthing (4)	4–1	Abingdon United (4)	Worthing
14:00	South 45'; Amerena 55', 86'; Hazlewood 90+4'	Report	Hartigan 85'	Stadium: Sussex Transport Community Stadium

26 October 2025	Keynsham Town (4)	1–0	Bournemouth Sports (4)	Keynsham
14:00	Goal	Report		Stadium: AJN Stadium; Attendance: 55

26 October 2025	AFC Portchester (5)	6–2	Gloucester City (5)	Portchester
14:00	4'; 25'; 44'; 59'; 75'; 90'	Report	Reimer 5'; Kaneko-Grun 82'	Stadium: Onsite Group Stadium; Attendance: 210

26 October 2025	Wycombe Wanderers (5)	1–1 (6–7 p)	Bridgwater United (4)	Burnham
14:00	Hennessy 26'	Report	Carslake 34'	Stadium: The 1878 Stadium; Attendance: 225
	Penalties
	Melton (penalty missed); Watkins (penalty scored); Hennessy (penalty scored); Wardlaw (penalty missed); Lynch (penalty scored); Kern (penalty scored); Atkins (penalty scored); Mulvaney (penalty scored); Harvey (penalty missed)		Penalty scored Penalty missed

26 October 2025	Fulham (4)	5–0	South London (7)	Motspur Park
14:00	Parsonson 6'; Stead 7', 90'; Adamson 45'; Olds 66'	Report		Stadium: Fulham FC Training Ground

26 October 2025	Swindon Town (4)	1–0	Dulwich Hamlet (4)	Swindon
14:00	MacDonald 23'	Report		Stadium: County Ground

26 October 2025	Portishead Town (4)	1–0	Billericay Town (3)	Portishead
14:00	Tate 90+7'	Report		Stadium: Bristol Road; Attendance: 74

26 October 2025	Farnham Town (6)	0–8	Leyton Orient (7)	Farnham
14:00		Report	Porter 7', 49', 77'; Rowland 22', 57', 73'; Balfour 45'; Kiszkis 45+3'	Stadium: The Memorial Ground

26 October 2025	Plymouth Argyle (3)	7–0	Maidstone United (7)	Plymouth
14:00	Papaioannou 18'; Noble 21', 65'; Stephens 27', 49'; Whitmore 28', 57'	Report		Stadium: Home Park; Attendance: 932

26 October 2025	Torquay United (5)	0–6	Exeter City (3)	Torquay
14:00		Report	Toogood 5'; Stacey 18', 31'; Sandland 22'; Sara 59'; Vaccaro 83'	Stadium: Plainmoor; Attendance: 1,010

26 October 2025	Dartford (5)	5–1	Forest Green Rovers (5)	Dartford
14:00	Smith 18', 84'; Adams 34'; Hanif 63'; Alberts 73'	Report	Jones 54'	Stadium: Princes Park; Attendance: 278

26 October 2025	Millbrook (7)	0–11	AFC Bournemouth (3)	Southampton
14:00		Report	Thompson 8', 27'; McGuinness 36'; Newton 38', 49'; Hennessy 44', 74'; Wilson 67', 70'; Quirk 77'; Markham 86'	Stadium: Test Park Sports Ground; Attendance: 411

26 October 2025	Saltdean United (5)	1–0	Bromley (6)	Newhaven
14:30	Lane 36'	Report		Stadium: Fort Road Recreation Ground; Attendance: 74

26 October 2025	Leafield Athletic (4)	8–0	Crusaders (6)	Birmingham
15:00	Gallop 30', 47', 49'; Horgan 32', 86'; Fraser 37'; Kraycheva 64'; Cowie 90+1'	Report		Stadium: Castle Vale Stadium

26 October 2025	Stevenage (5)	3–4	Norwich City (4)	Letchworth
15:00	28' (o.g.); Wiltshire 44', 80'	Report	Williams 14'; Kennard 51', 57'; Snelling 90+6'	Stadium: Herts FA County Ground

26 October 2025	Solihull Moors (5)	0–3	West Bromwich Albion (3)	Studley
15:00		Report	Rhodes 48'; 54' (o.g.); Creaney 66'	Stadium: The Beehive

26 October 2025	Brentford (5)	1–1 (3–4 p)	Sutton United (5)	Bedfont
15:00	Alaneme 10'	Report	Williams 75'	Stadium: Bedfont Sports Club; Attendance: 267
	Penalties
	Phillips (penalty missed); Cheatley (penalty scored); Berry (penalty scored); Sangha (penalty scored); Down (penalty missed); Saunders (penalty missed)		Humphries (penalty scored); Cutler (penalty missed); Clark (penalty missed); Langley (penalty scored); Walters (penalty scored)

26 October 2025	Hashtag United (3)	1–1 (4–5 p)	Oxford United (3)	Aveley
15:00	25'	Report	Casley 3'	Stadium: Parkside
	Penalties
	Penalty scored Penalty missed		Legg (penalty scored); Palmer (penalty scored); Casley (penalty scored); Barrett (penalty missed); Gibson (penalty missed); Turner (penalty scored); Wiseman (penalty missed); Bedeau (penalty scored)

26 October 2025	Bowers & Pitsea (5)	3–2	Wimborne Town (6)	Pitsea
15:00	Kilden 39', 88'; Harris 90+6' (pen.)	Report	45+1'; 90+4'	Stadium: Len Salmon Stadium; Attendance: 206

== Second round proper ==
The draw for the second round proper took place on 27 October 2025. 25 matches were played on 21 and 23 November 2025, with three rearranged fixtures played the following week.

21 November 2025	Wolverhampton Wanderers (3)	2–0	Stoke City (3)	Wellington
19:30	Merrick 74'; Quigley 89'			Stadium: New Bucks Head; Attendance: 854; Referee: Alicia Kennedy

23 November 2025	Oxford United (3)	3–1	Luton Town (4)	Oxford
12:00	Manders 1', 13'; Bedeau 49'	Report	Maddix 40'	Stadium: Court Place Farm; Attendance: 329

23 November 2025	Burnley (3)	4–0	Norwich City (4)	Leyland
13:00	Chadwick 9'; Paul 15'; Siddall 37'; Kelly 76'	Report		Stadium: County Ground

23 November 2025	Middlesbrough (3)	3–0	Northampton Town (4)	Stockton-on-Tees
13:00	Holmes 33', 65'; Robson 61'	Report		Stadium: Bishopton Road West

23 November 2025	York City (4)	3–1	Wroxham (5)	Heslington
13:00	Watt 8'; Bell 36', 80'	Report	Kindred 79' (pen.)	Stadium: University of York Sports Centre

23 November 2025	Mancunian Unity (5)	2–1	Durham Cestria (4)	Chadderton
13:00	Ince 70' (pen.); 76' (o.g.)	Report	Dale 47'	Stadium: Andrew Street

23 November 2025	Ponteland United (5)	0–1	Altrincham (6)	Ponteland
13:00		Report	Lowe 85'	Stadium: Ponteland Leisure Centre

23 November 2025	Leafield Athletic (4)	1–1 (4–3 p)	Worcester City (4)	Birmingham
13:00	Shirley 63'	Report	Clark 8'	Stadium: Farnborough Road
	Penalties
	Gallop (penalty missed); Crackle (penalty missed); Embley (penalty scored); Cowie (penalty scored); Gaspar (penalty scored); Bennett-Steele (penalty scored)		Rich (penalty scored); Matthews (penalty missed); Zaffignani (penalty missed); Haggett (penalty scored); Marriott (penalty scored); Springer (penalty missed)

23 November 2025	Huddersfield Town (4)	1–3	Leeds United (4)	Kirkburton
13:00	Beresford 84'	Report	Gibrill-Keating 24'; Elliott 55'; Greene 73'	Stadium: Graham Leslie Arena; Attendance: 101

23 November 2025	Bridgwater United (4)	1–1 (2–4 p)	Royston Town (5)	Kenn
13:00	Pengelly 85' (pen.)	Report	Bodily 90+8'	Stadium: North Somerset Community Stadium
	Penalties
	Penalty scored Penalty missed		Hayes (penalty scored); Houghton (penalty scored); Cattini (penalty scored); Mills (penalty scored)

23 November 2025	Cheltenham Town (3)	0–4	Lewes (3)	Southam
13:00		Report	Lane 21', 90+2'; Harvey 36'; Ferguson 82'	Stadium: Kayte Lane

23 November 2025	Leyton Orient (7)	1–7	AFC Bournemouth (3)	Cheshunt
13:00	Rowland 27'	Report	Jones 6'; 11' (o.g.); 26' (o.g.); Quirk 29', 70'; Cole 41'; Markham 61'	Stadium: Theobalds Lane; Attendance: 250

23 November 2025	London Bees (4)	5–0	Portishead Town (4)	Canons Park
13:00	Isherwood 17', 20'; Heil 45+3'; Lanza 47'; Larkin 84'	Report		Stadium: The Hive Stadium; Attendance: 81

23 November 2025	Dartford (5)	2–1	Keynsham Town (4)	Dartford
13:00	Lewis-Powell 19'; Davies 33'	Report	Bible 89'	Stadium: Princes Park Stadium; Attendance: 354

23 November 2025	Bristol Rovers (4)	1–3	Fulham (4)	Horfield
14:00	Jarvis 49'	Report	Stead 7'; Olds 32'; Bradley 45'	Stadium: Memorial Stadium; Referee: Shaun Thorne

23 November 2025	Liverpool Feds (3)	5–0	Boldmere St. Michaels (4)	Liverpool
14:00	Coulthard 4'; Fisher 5'; Thompson 46'; Parry 59'; Johnson 71'	Report		Stadium: Walton Hall Park

23 November 2025	Derby County (3)	4–1	Stockport County (4)	Mickleover
14:00	Joyce 40'; May 59'; Stevens 72'; Wilson 85'	Report	Podmore 24'	Stadium: Don Amott Arena; Attendance: 675

23 November 2025	West Bromwich Albion (3)	2–0	Cambridge United (4)	Perry Barr
14:00	May 47'; Warner 90'	Report		Stadium: Alexander Stadium

23 November 2025	Sporting Khalsa (3)	2–0	Hednesford Town (5)	Willenhall
14:00	Denham 83' (pen.); Owen 90+10'	Report		Stadium: Guardian Warehousing Arena

23 November 2025	AFC Fylde (5)	4–0	Kidderminster Harriers (4)	Bryning-with-Warton
14:00	Flanagan 17'; Payton 52'; Moore 56'; Hickson 89'	Report		Stadium: Kellamergh Park

23 November 2025	Stourbridge (4)	1–7	Hull City (3)	Amblecote
14:00	Edwards 90'	Report	Akril 12'; Knight 18', 45', 88', 90+2'; Tugby-Andrew 49'; Gigg 83'	Stadium: War Memorial Ground; Attendance: 150

23 November 2025	Exeter City (3)	2–2 (2–4 p)	Chatham Town (4)	Newton Abbot
14:00	Baker 14'; Vaccaro 76'	Report	Jeffkins 41', 86'	Stadium: Coach Road
	Penalties
	Vaccaro (penalty scored); Gillies (penalty missed); Burridge (penalty scored); Ireland (penalty scored); Seaman (penalty missed)		Penalty scored

23 November 2025	Plymouth Argyle (3)	2–0	Gwalia United (3)	Plymouth
14:00	Poole 36', 39' (pen.)	Report		Stadium: Home Park; Attendance: 820

23 November 2025	Bowers & Pitsea (5)	2–3	Sutton United (5)	Pitsea
15:00	Clarke 50'; Harris 78' (pen.)	Report	Humphreys 13' (pen.); Cutler 49', 56'	Stadium: Len Salmon Stadium

23 November 2025	Oxford City (5)	0–3	Swindon Town (4)	Oxford
15:00		Report	Colston 6', 31', 85'	Stadium: Court Place Farm; Attendance: 757

30 November 2025	Peterborough United (4)	4–0	Wallsend BC (5)	Peterborough
13:00	Rousseau 45'; Bennett 62', 90'; Osker 90+2'	Report		Stadium: PIMS Stadium; Attendance: 176

30 November 2025	AFC Portchester (5)	4–1	Worthing (4)	Portchester
13:00	Morgan 45+4'; True 50'; Bath 53', 68'	Report	Jellett 11'	Stadium: OnSite Group Stadium; Attendance: 332

30 November 2025	Watford (3)	4–0	Saltdean United (5)	Yiewsley
13:00	Walsh 11'; Haines 28'; Chandler 62'; Ayisi 88'	Report		Stadium: Honeycroft

== Third round proper ==
The draw for the third round proper took place on 24 November 2025 and included the introduction of 12 teams from the second-tier Women's Super League 2. 20 matches were played on 13 and 14 December 2025.

13 December 2025	Wolverhampton Wanderers (3)	1–2	Nottingham Forest (2)	Hednesford
12:15	Marshall 58'	Report	Brougham 4'; Claypool 20'	Stadium: Keys Park; Attendance: 705; Referee: Francesca Catchpole

14 December 2025	Durham (2)	0–1	Sheffield United (2)	Durham
12:00			Devlin 64'	Stadium: Maiden Castle; Attendance: 434

14 December 2025	Newcastle United (2)	4–0	Liverpool Feds (3)	Gateshead
12:00	Hayles 20', 41'; Murphy 45+4'; McQuade 82'	Report		Stadium: Gateshead International Stadium; Attendance: 707

14 December 2025	Burnley (3)	7–0	Peterborough United (4)	Leyland
13:00	Chadwick 42'; Daniëls 45+1'; Ravening 50' (pen.); Docherty 61'; Walker 68', 78'; Siddall 72'	Report		Stadium: County Ground; Attendance: 100

14 December 2025	Southampton (2)	10–0	Royston Town (5)	Eastleigh
13:00	Simpson 3'; Bashford 10'; Primus 20', 28' (pen.), 45+2'; McAlonie 40', 78'; Brazil 45'; Hack 53'; Palmer 70'			Stadium: Ten Acres

14 December 2025	Dartford (5)	2–3 (a.e.t.)	London Bees (4)	Dartford
13:00	Hanif 64'; Smith 73'	Report	Lanza 1'; Isherwood 26' (pen.); Fowle 94'	Stadium: Princes Park; Attendance: 420

14 December 2025	AFC Portchester (5)	0–5	Ipswich Town (2)	Portchester
13:00			O'Brien 5'; Robertson 45'; Dean 63'; Seaby 66'; Earl 86'	Stadium: OnSite Group Stadium; Attendance: 446

14 December 2025	Oxford United (3)	2–1	Plymouth Argyle (3)	Marston
13:00	Sealey 86'; Thompson 90+5'	Report	Noble 15'	Stadium: The MGroup Stadium; Attendance: 248

14 December 2025	Middlesbrough (3)	3–0	AFC Fylde (5)	Stockton-on-Tees
14:00	Holmes 11'; Maxwell 25'; Ashton 45' (o.g.)	Report		Stadium: Bishopton Road West; Attendance: 269

14 December 2025	Leeds United (4)	0–3	West Bromwich Albion (3)	Garforth
14:00		Report	Robinson 71'; May 73'; Sorrentino 90+3'	Stadium: Bannister Prentice Stadium; Attendance: 160

14 December 2025	Birmingham City (2)	6–0	Sporting Khalsa (3)	Birmingham
14:00	Crosthwaite 17'; Sarri 35'; McKenna 57'; Herron 74'; Cornet 75'; Baker 89'	Report		Stadium: St Andrew's; Attendance: 582

14 December 2025	Mancunian Unity (5)	1–2	Hull City (3)	Chadderton
14:00	Mitchell 75'	Report	Knight 40'; Tugby-Andrew 47'	Stadium: Andrew Street

14 December 2025	Derby County (3)	1–5	Sunderland (2)	Mickleover
14:00	Muir 4'	Report	Barry 10', 56'; Watson 14', 25'; Greenwood 63'	Stadium: Don Amott Arena; Attendance: 338

14 December 2025	Altrincham (6)	0–3	York City (4)	Altrincham
14:00		Report	Watt 22'; Astle 23'; Varley 89'	Stadium: Moss Lane; Attendance: 586

14 December 2025	AFC Bournemouth (3)	5–0	Fulham (4)	Ringwood
14:00	Quirk 28'; Barron-Clark 40'; Markham 43'; James 71'; Treweek 87'	Report		Stadium: Macra Community Stadium

14 December 2025	Charlton Athletic (2)	3–2	Watford (3)	Charlton
14:00	Muya 52'; Bradley 58'; Kenney 88'	Report	Chandler 35'; Haines 90+2'	Stadium: The Valley; Attendance: 329

14 December 2025	Sutton United (5)	0–3	Chatham Town (4)	Sutton
14:30		Report	Charles 5'; Woodgate 57'; Russ 63'	Stadium: Gander Green Lane; Attendance: 426

14 December 2025	Bristol City (2)	2–0	Portsmouth (2)	Failand
15:00	Farrugia 34'; Ward 57'			Stadium: Robins HPC; Attendance: 284

14 December 2025	Leafield Athletic (4)	2–3	Swindon Town (4)	Sutton Coldfield
15:00	Fraser 13'; Gallop 34'	Report	Colston 55', 84', 90+4'	Stadium: The Dominos Arena; Attendance: 200

14 December 2025	Lewes (3)	0–1	Crystal Palace (2)	Lewes
16:00		Report	Cato 42'	Stadium: The Dripping Pan; Attendance: 1,164; Referee: Ryan Bostock

== Fourth round ==
The draw for the fourth round took place on 15 December 2025 and included the introduction of 12 teams from the first-tier Women's Super League. It was the final round to introduce new teams. 16 matches were played between 15–18 January 2026.

15 January 2026	West Bromwich Albion (3)	0–5	Everton (1)	Perry Barr
19:30		Report	Momiki 9', 34'; Vignola 50'; Payne 53'; Hobson 54'	Stadium: Alexander Stadium; Attendance: 411; Referee: Lauren Impey

16 January 2026	Newcastle United (2)	0–3	West Ham United (1)	Gateshead
19:30		Report	Asseyi 38' (pen.); Ueki 56'; Brasero-Carreira 71'	Stadium: Gateshead International Stadium; Attendance: 1,340; Referee: Abby Dearden

17 January 2026	Sunderland (2)	0–1	London City Lionesses (1)	Hetton-le-Hole
12:15		Report	Sangaré 50'	Stadium: Eppleton CW; Attendance: 389; Referee: Adewunmi Soneye

17 January 2026	Chelsea (1)	5–0	Crystal Palace (2)	Kingston upon Thames
12:30	Bright 13'; Kerr 22', 51'; Reiten 29' (pen.); Thompson 70'	Report		Stadium: Kingsmeadow; Attendance: 2,058; Referee: Stacey Fullicks

18 January 2026	Tottenham Hotspur (1)	3–0	Leicester City (1)	Leyton
12:00	England 24'; Spence 74'; Gunning-Williams 90+1'	Report		Stadium: Brisbane Road; Attendance: 1,062; Referee: Kirsty Dowle

18 January 2026	AFC Bournemouth (3)	0–6	Manchester City (1)	Totton
13:00		Report	K. Shaw 19'; Hemp 40'; Coombs 43', 44'; Miedema 58', 85'	Stadium: Testwood Stadium; Attendance: 2,089; Referee: Sophie Dennington

18 January 2026	Ipswich Town (2)	1–2	Sheffield United (2)	Felixstowe
13:00	O'Brien 40'	Report	Devlin 4', 69'	Stadium: Dellwood Avenue; Attendance: 491; Referee: Lucy May

18 January 2026	Oxford United (3)	3–1	Middlesbrough (3)	Oxford
13:00	Barker 85'; Casley 90'; Manders 90+4'	Report	Ferguson 73'	Stadium: Court Place Farm; Attendance: 477; Referee: Feiruz Abdullahi

18 January 2026	Chatham Town (4)	3–0	York City (4)	Chatham
13:00	Jeffkins 11'; Woodgate 31', 44'	Report		Stadium: The Bauvill Stadium; Attendance: 1,671; Referee: Laura Van Lier

18 January 2026	Manchester United (1)	5–0	Burnley (3)	Leigh
13:00	Le Tissier 2'; Zigiotti 21'; Awujo 35'; Schüller 47'; Drury 76'	Report		Stadium: Leigh Sports Village; Attendance: 2,835; Referee: Alice Parker

18 January 2026	Southampton (2)	1–2 (a.e.t.)	Bristol City (2)	Eastleigh
13:00	McAlonie 42'	Report	Syme 79', 118'	Stadium: Ten Acres; Attendance: 449; Referee: Ryan Atkin

18 January 2026	London Bees (4)	0–6	Liverpool (1)	Edgware
13:00		Report	O'Sullivan 6'; Enderby 13'; Thomas 33'; Bonner 53'; Bergström 87', 88'	Stadium: The Hive Stadium; Attendance: 881; Referee: Aimee Keir

18 January 2026	Brighton & Hove Albion (1)	2–0	Nottingham Forest (2)	Crawley
13:00	Haley 45+3' (pen.); Čanković 90+2'	Report		Stadium: Broadfield Stadium; Attendance: 916; Referee: Stacey Pearson

18 January 2026	Charlton Athletic (2)	10–0	Swindon Town (4)	Charlton
14:00	Hutton 15'; Thestrup 20', 22', 66'; Muya 40'; Bissell 68'; Lockwood 76', 88'; Kenney 90+2', 90+6'	Report		Stadium: The Valley; Attendance: 438; Referee: Francesca Catchpole

18 January 2026	Arsenal (1)	2–0	Aston Villa (1)	Borehamwood
14:00	Blackstenius 52'; Little 62'	Report		Stadium: Meadow Park; Attendance: 2,722; Referee: Lisa Benn

18 January 2026	Hull City (3)	2–6	Birmingham City (2)	North Ferriby
14:00	Tanser 58'; Haywood 85'	Report	Cornet 2'; Crosthwaite 34'; Lindström 41'; Sarri 45+1'; Hopcroft 47'; Miyagawa 87'	Stadium: The Versa Sportswear Stadium; Attendance: 745; Referee: Lola Pollard

== Fifth round ==
The draw for the fifth round took place on 19 January 2026. Eight matches were played between 21–23 February 2026.

21 February 2026	Birmingham City (2)	8–0	Chatham Town (4)	Birmingham
17:15	Hurtré 26', 59', 68'; Sarri 53'; Louis 65', 89'; Lee 70'; Leidhammar 76'	Report		Stadium: St Andrew's; Attendance: 746; Referee: Lucy May

22 February 2026	West Ham United (1)	1–2	Brighton & Hove Albion (1)	Dagenham
12:00	Wandeler 75'	Report	Kirby 6'; Seike 20'	Stadium: Victoria Road; Attendance: 710; Referee: Sophie Dennington

22 February 2026	Arsenal (1)	3–0	Bristol City (2)	Borehamwood
13:00	Little 25'; Pelova 62'; Maanum 69'	Report		Stadium: Meadow Park; Attendance: 2,665; Referee: Stacey Fullicks

22 February 2026	Chelsea (1)	2–1 (a.e.t.)	Manchester United (1)	Kingston upon Thames
13:30	Kerr 78'; Girma 99'	Report	Awujo 81'	Stadium: Kingsmeadow; Attendance: 2,964; Referee: Phoebe Cross

22 February 2026	Manchester City (1)	4–0	Sheffield United (2)	Manchester
14:00	Hemp 7', 11'; Fujino 21'; Coombs 90+3'	Report		Stadium: Academy Stadium; Attendance: 2,800; Referee: Alice Parker

22 February 2026	Oxford United (3)	0–1	Charlton Athletic (2)	Oxford
14:00		Report	Fitzgerald 76' (pen.)	Stadium: Court Place Farm; Attendance: 1,185; Referee: Francesca Catchpole

22 February 2026	Liverpool (1)	2–1	Everton (1)	St Helens
16:30	Enderby 34'; Olsson 45'	Report	Falk 72' (o.g.)	Stadium: BrewDog Stadium; Attendance: 3,594; Referee: Adewunmi Soneye

23 February 2026	London City Lionesses (1)	2–2 (a.e.t.) (8–9 p)	Tottenham Hotspur (1)	Bromley
19:30	Van de Donk 58'; Fernández 59'	Report	Vinberg 7'; England 90+6' (pen.)	Stadium: Hayes Lane; Attendance: 1,400; Referee: Ryan Atkin
	Penalties
	Goodwin (penalty scored); Corrales (penalty scored); Pattinson (penalty scored); Roddar (penalty scored); Partido (penalty scored); Kumagai (penalty scored); Marcetto (penalty scored); Fernández (penalty scored); Sangaré (penalty missed)		England (penalty scored); Tandberg (penalty scored); A. Nildén (penalty scored); Gaupset (penalty scored); Koga (penalty scored); Kop (penalty scored); Ahtinen (penalty scored); Gunning-Williams (penalty scored); Wijk (penalty scored)

== Quarter-finals ==
The draw for the quarter-finals took place on 23 February 2026. Four matches were played on 5 and 6 April 2026.

5 April 2026	Arsenal (1)	0–2	Brighton & Hove Albion (1)	Borehamwood
13:00		Report	Haley 48'; Hayes 63'	Stadium: Meadow Park; Attendance: 3,660; Referee: Abigail Byrne

5 April 2026	Charlton Athletic (2)	0–1 (a.e.t.)	Liverpool (1)	Charlton
14:30		Report	Z. Shaw 115'	Stadium: The Valley; Attendance: 2,164; Referee: Megan Wilson

6 April 2026	Chelsea (1)	2–1	Tottenham Hotspur (1)	Kingston upon Thames
13:30	Kerr 40'; Buurman 86'		Summanen 52'	Stadium: Kingsmeadow; Attendance: 2,736; Referee: Stacey Pearson

6 April 2026	Birmingham City (2)	0–1	Manchester City (1)	Birmingham
17:00			K. Shaw 8'	Stadium: St Andrew's; Attendance: 2,607; Referee: Grace Lowe

== Semi-finals ==
The draw for the semi-finals took place on 6 April 2026. Two matches were played on 10 May 2026.

10 May 2026	Liverpool (1)	2–3	Brighton & Hove Albion (1)	St Helens
12:15 BST	O'Sullivan 11'; Olsson 22'	Report	Vanegas 23'; Haley 54'; Noordam 90+5'	Stadium: BrewDog Stadium; Referee: Kirsty Dowle

10 May 2026	Chelsea (1)	2–3 (a.e.t.)	Manchester City (1)	Kingston upon Thames
15:30 BST	Cuthbert 8'; Kerr 59'	Report	Fowler 86'; K. Shaw 90+1', 103'	Stadium: Kingsmeadow; Referee: Phoebe Cross

== Final ==
The final was played at Wembley Stadium on 31 May 2026.

31 May 2026
15:00 BST

Brighton & Hove Albion	0–4	Manchester City
	Report	Shaw 38'; Greenwood 45+6'; Fujino 66'; Miedema 87'

Wembley Stadium, London
Attendance: 43,917
Referee: Melissa Burgin (Manchester)

== Television rights ==
Round	Date	Teams	Kick-off	Channels
Fourth round	16 January	Newcastle United v West Ham United	19:30	TNT Sports 1 and Discovery+
Fourth round	17 January	Sunderland v London City Lionesses	12:15	TNT Sports 1 and Discovery+
Fourth round	18 January	Arsenal v Aston Villa	14:00	TNT Sports 1, Discovery+ and Channel 4
Fifth round	21 February	Birmingham City v Chatham Town	17:15	TNT Sports 1 and Discovery+
Fifth round	22 February	Chelsea v Manchester United	13:30	TNT Sports 1 and Discovery+
Fifth round	22 February	Liverpool v Everton	16:30	TNT Sports 1, Discovery+ and Channel 4
Fifth round	23 February	London City Lionesses v Tottenham Hotspur	19:30	TNT Sports 1 and Discovery+
Quarter-finals	5 April	Arsenal v Brighton & Hove Albion	13:00	TNT Sports 1 and HBO Max
Quarter-finals	5 April	Charlton Athletic v Liverpool	14:30	TNT Sports 2 and HBO Max
Quarter-finals	6 April	Chelsea v Tottenham Hotspur	13:30	TNT Sports 1, HBO Max and Channel 4
Quarter-finals	6 April	Birmingham City v Manchester City	17:00	TNT Sports 1 and HBO Max

== See also ==
- 2025–26 Women's League Cup
