= 2018–19 Yeovil Town L.F.C. season =

Yeovil Town
2018–19 season
- Manager: Lee Burch
- Stadium: The Avenue Stadium
- Women's Super League: 11th (relegated)
- Women's FA Cup: Fourth round
- Women's League Cup: Group stage

The 2018–19 season was Yeovil Town Ladies Football Club's second consecutive season in the top-flight of English women's football, the Women's Super League, in which they finished bottom. They also competed in the Women's FA Cup and Women's League Cup, in which they were eliminated in the fourth round and group stage respectively.

== Season summary ==
In June 2018, Lee Burch was appointed as head coach, after Jamie Sherwood stood down at the end of the previous season.

In March 2019, the club was reported to have entered administration. They were deducted 10 points during the 2018–19 season, finishing 15 points adrift and getting relegated. However, in May 2019, they were denied an operating licence for the Championship and would have to contest the following season as a third tier club instead. In June 2019, owner Steve Allinson announced his intention to relinquish ownership of the team free of charge in order to find investors capable of sustaining the team. Burch left the club in June 2019.

== Competitions ==
=== Women's Super League ===
==== League table ====
Pos	Team	Pld	W	D	L	GF	GA	GD	Pts	Qualification
7	West Ham United	20	7	2	11	25	37	−12	23	
8	Liverpool	20	7	1	12	21	38	−17	22	
9	Brighton & Hove Albion	20	4	4	12	16	38	−22	16	
10	Everton	20	3	3	14	15	38	−23	12	
11	Yeovil Town (R)	20	2	1	17	11	60	−49	−3 (Note: Yeovil Town deducted 10 points for entering administration.)	Relegation to the Championship

Source: FA WSL
Rules for classification: 1) Points; 2) Goal difference; 3) Number of goals scored
(R) Relegated

==== Matches ====
Women's Super League match details
Date	Opponents	Venue	Result	Score F–A	Scorers	Attendance	Ref.
9 September 2018	Reading	Away	L	0–4		464	
19 September 2018	Arsenal	Home	L	0–7		1,101	
30 September 2018	West Ham United	Away	L	1–2	Mason 78'	376	
14 October 2018	Liverpool	Away	L	1–2	Heatherson 28'	423	
21 October 2018	Bristol City	Home	L	1–2	Gaylor 33'	583	
28 October 2018	Brighton & Hove Albion	Away	L	1–2	Mason 69'	562	
4 November 2018	Everton	Home	W	1–0	Short 21'	732	
18 November 2018	Chelsea	Away	L	0–5		1,484	
25 November 2018	Manchester City	Home	L	0–4		1,153	
2 December 2018	Birmingham City	Away	L	1–2	Syme 90+3'	1,153	
9 December 2018	West Ham United	Home	L	0–5		516	
13 January 2019	Liverpool	Home	L	1–2	Donovan 52'	984	
27 January 2019	Bristol City	Away	L	1–2	Heatherson 46'	616	
20 February 2019	Arsenal	Away	L	0–3		1,107	
13 March 2019	Brighton & Hove Albion	Home	D	1–1	Mason 64'	408	
31 March 2019	Everton	Away	W	1–0	Alexander 78'	230	
17 April 2019	Reading	Home	L	0–5		407	
28 April 2019	Manchester City	Away	L	1–2	Fergusson 1'	1,369	
7 May 2019	Chelsea	Home	L	0–8		843	
11 May 2019	Birmingham City	Home	L	0–2		463	

=== Women's FA Cup ===
Women's FA Cup match details
Round	Date	Opponents	Venue	Result	Score F–A	Scorers	Attendance	Ref.
Fourth round	10 February 2019	Birmingham City	Home	L	1–3	Bloomfield 78'	523	

=== Women's League Cup ===
==== Group stage ====
Pos	Team	Pld	W	WPEN	LPEN	L	GF	GA	GD	Pts	Qualification	CHE	BHA	CRY	TOT	LON	YEO
1	Chelsea	5	5	0	0	0	25	2	+23	15	Advance to knock-out stage	—	3–1	—	—	—	7–0
2	Brighton & Hove Albion	5	3	0	1	1	15	8	+7	10	Advance to knock-out stage	—	—	5–1	—	3–1	—
3	Crystal Palace	5	2	1	0	2	10	12	−2	8		0–4	—	—	1–1	7–2	—
4	Tottenham Hotspur	5	1	1	1	2	9	12	−3	6		0–5	2–2	—	—	—	—
5	London Bees	5	1	1	0	3	9	19	−10	5		1–6	—	—	4–2	—	1–1
6	Yeovil Town	5	0	0	1	4	2	17	−15	1		—	1–4	0–1	0–4	—	—

Source: thefa.com
Rules for classification: 1) Points; 2) Goal difference; 3) Number of goals scored

Women's League Cup match details
Date	Opponents	Venue	Result	Score F–A	Scorers	Attendance	Ref.
19 August 2018	London Bees	Away	D	1–1; 3–5 p	Fergusson 40'	246	
26 August 2018	Crystal Palace	Home	L	0–1		301	
16 September 2018	Tottenham Hotspur	Home	L	0–4		415	
5 December 2018	Chelsea	Away	L	0–7		916	
12 December 2018	Brighton & Hove Albion	Home	L	1–4	Syme 37'	224	

== Player statistics ==
No.	Pos	Nat	Player	Total		Women's Super League		Women's FA Cup		Women's League Cup	
No.	Pos	Nat	Player	Apps	Goals	Apps	Goals	Apps	Goals	Apps	Goals
1	GK	(England) ENG	Megan Walsh	24	0	20	0	1	0	3	0
2	DF	(England) ENG	Amy Goddard	18	0	14	0	0	0	4	0
3	DF	(England) ENG	Megan Alexander	26	1	20	1	1	0	5	0
4	MF	(England) ENG	Emily Syme	19	2	15	1	1	0	3	1
5	DF	(Wales) WAL	Nicola Cousins	24	0	18	0	1	0	5	0
6	DF	(England) ENG	Hannah Short	24	1	18	1	1	0	5	0
7	FW	(England) ENG	Olivia Fergusson	25	2	20	1	1	0	4	1
8	MF	(England) ENG	Bonnie Horwood	22	0	17	0	1	0	4	0
9	FW	(England) ENG	Ann-Marie Heatherson	24	2	20	2	1	0	3	0
10	MF	(England) ENG	Amber Gaylor	15	1	12	1	0	0	3	0
12	MF	(England) ENG	Ellie Mason	25	3	20	3	1	0	4	0
14	MF	(England) ENG	Emily Donovan	24	1	18	1	1	0	5	0
15	DF	(England) ENG	Charlotte Buxton	14	0	10	0	1	0	3	0
16	MF	(Wales) WAL	Georgia Evans	23	0	19	0	1	0	3	0
18	MF	(England) ENG	Leah Burridge	6	0	3	0	0	0	3	0
19	FW	(Wales) WAL	Liberty Piggott	2	0	1	0	0	0	1	0
23	GK	(England) ENG	Bethany-May Howard	2	0	0	0	0	0	2	0
25	DF	(Scotland) SCO	Rachel McLauchlan	8	0	7	0	1	0	0	0
26	FW	(England) ENG	Erin Bloomfield	12	1	9	0	1	1	2	0
28	MF	(England) ENG	Charlie Taylor	2	0	1	0	0	0	1	0
29	FW	(England) ENG	Shannon Albuery	10	0	7	0	0	0	3	0
30	MF	(Samoa) SAM	Monique Fischer	7	0	4	0	0	0	3	0
