= Ellie Curson =

Welsh footballer (born 1994)

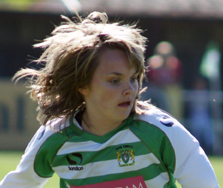
- Curson playing for Yeovil Town in 2014

Personal information
- Full name: Ellen Rose Curson
- Date of birth: 18 February 1994 (age 32)
- Place of birth: Newport, Wales
- Positions: Midfielder; forward

Youth career
- 2001–2005: Griffithstown
- 2005–2006: Mardy Tigers
- 2006–2010: Bristol Academy

Senior career*
Years	Team	Apps	(Gls)
2010–2014	Bristol Academy	18	(0)
2014–2018	Yeovil Town	60	(6)

International career^{‡}
2012–2016	Wales	3	(0)
- * Club domestic league appearances and goals as of 16:37, 11 February 2018 (UTC) ‡ National team caps and goals as of 13:07, 9 March 2016 (UTC)

Ellen Rose Curson (born 18 February 1994) is a Welsh professional footballer who most recently played for Yeovil Town Ladies (now Bridgewater United W.F.C.).

== Background ==
Curson was born in Newport, and grew up in nearby Griffithstown, Pontypool. She began her football career at the age of 7 after joining her brother's training sessions run by her father and started playing for Griffithstown under-8 boys team playing with them until the age of 11. She then joined local girls side Mardy Tigers with whom she played until she signed for the Bristol Academy Centre of Excellence at the age of 12. Having joined Bristol, Curson studied her A-levels at Filton College. In June 2016, Curson graduated from Cardiff Metropolitan University, with a first-class bachelors degree in Sport and Physical Education.

== Club career ==
=== Bristol Academy ===
Having progressed through the youth and reserve sides, Curson made her debut for Bristol Academy, on 9 May 2010, having been introduced as a substitute in Bristol's final match of the season in the FA Women's Premier League against Watford. Curson signed her first contract with Bristol Academy during their first FA WSL season in June 2011. On 5 October 2011, Curson scored her first goal for Bristol Academy in their 4–2 Champions League defeat against Energiya Vorenzh. Curson also featured as an unused substitute in Bristol Academy's FA Women's Cup final defeat in 2013 against Arsenal Ladies. She was released by Bristol Academy in June 2014.

While at Bristol Academy and studying a degree at Cardiff Metropolitan University, Curson represented the Cardiff Met. Ladies in the Welsh Premier League.

=== Yeovil Town Ladies ===
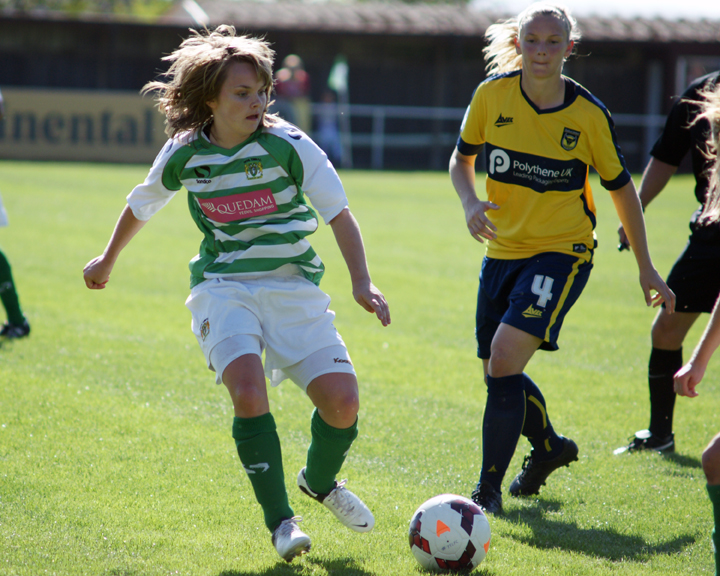
Curson representing Yeovil in a WSL 2 match against Oxford United, in 2014

On 23 June 2014, following her release from Bristol, Curson signed for FA WSL 2 side Yeovil Town Ladies. Curson made her debut for Yeovil, on 28 June 2014, against Sunderland in a 2–0 defeat. Curson enjoyed a successful 2015 season as Yeovil finished fourth in WSL 2, and was named manager Jamie Sherwood's player of the season and signed a new one-year deal ahead of the 2016 season.

On 22 January 2018, Curson left Yeovil Town after she decided she could not make the switch to full-time football.

== International career ==
Having represented Wales at under-16, under-17 and under-19 levels, Curson made her Welsh national team debut at the age of 18 in a friendly against the Netherlands in November 2012.

== Career statistics ==
As of 11 February 2018.

Appearances and goals by club, season and competition
Club	Season	League			FA Women's Cup		WSL Cup		Europe		Total	
Club	Season	Division	Apps	Goals	Apps	Goals	Apps	Goals	Apps	Goals	Apps	Goals
Bristol Academy	2009–10	WPL National	1	0	0	0	—		—		1	0
Bristol Academy	2011	FA WSL	0	0	0	0	0	0	1	1	1	1
Bristol Academy	2012	FA WSL	8	0	0	0	0	0	—		8	0
Bristol Academy	2013	FA WSL	9	0	0	0	0	0	—		9	0
Bristol Academy	2014	FA WSL 1	0	0	3	0	1	0	0	0	4	0
Bristol Academy	Total		18	0	3	0	1	0	1	1	23	1
Yeovil Town Ladies	2014	FA WSL 2	13	2	0	0	0	0	—		13	2
Yeovil Town Ladies	2015	FA WSL 2	17	2	2	1	4	0	—		23	3
Yeovil Town Ladies	2016	FA WSL 2	18	2	3	0	0	0	—		21	2
Yeovil Town Ladies	2017	FA WSL 1	8	0	1	0	—		—		9	0
Yeovil Town Ladies	2017–18	FA WSL 1	4	0	0	0	3	0	—		7	0
Yeovil Town Ladies	Total		60	6	6	1	7	0	—		73	7
Career total			78	6	9	1	8	0	1	1	96	8

== Honours ==
Yeovil Town

- FA WSL 2: 2016
