= Stephanie Williams (Welsh footballer) =

Welsh footballer (born 1992)

Steph Williams
Personal information
- Full name: Stephanie Louise Williams
- Date of birth: 12 August 1992 (age 34)
- Position: Midfielder

Team information
- Current team: Oxford United

Youth career
- Cardiff City LFC

Senior career*
Years	Team	Apps	(Gls)
2008–2015	Cardiff City LFC		
2015–2017	Yeovil Town	35	(0)
2017–	Oxford United	8	(0)

International career^{‡}
2015–	Wales	1	(0)
- * Club domestic league appearances and goals as of 10:39, 15 August 2017 (UTC) ‡ National team caps and goals as of 15:25, 7 February 2016 (UTC)

Stephanie Louise Williams (born 12 August 1992) is a footballer who plays as a midfielder for Oxford United W.F.C. Williams received her first senior international call-up in 2015, after establishing herself as a holding midfielder in Yeovil Town's FA WSL 2 campaign. She started Wales's 2–1 defeat by Slovakia in April 2015.

In August 2017, Williams was released by Yeovil Town.

== Personal life ==
On 7 June 2025, Williams married English footballer Bethany England.
