= Megan Walsh (footballer) =

Irish footballer (born 1994)

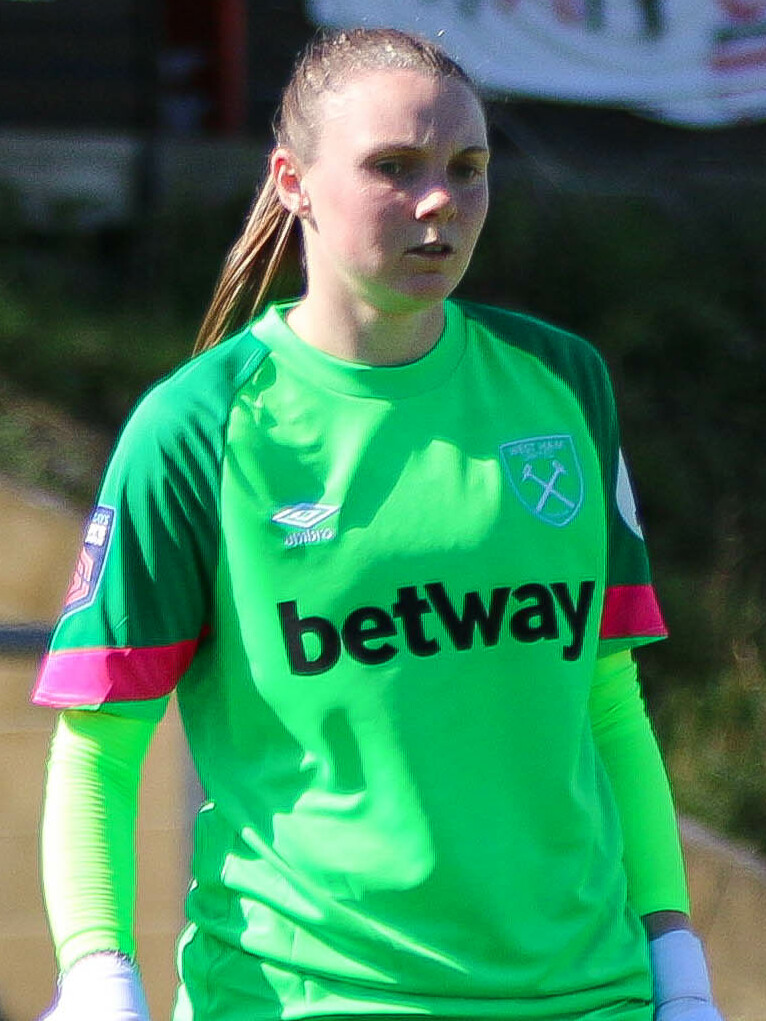
- Walsh with West Ham in 2023

Personal information
- Full name: Megan Laura Walsh
- Date of birth: 12 November 1994 (age 31)
- Place of birth: Bromsgrove, England
- Height: 5 ft 8 in (1.73 m)
- Position: Goalkeeper

Team information
- Current team: West Ham United
- Number: 25

Youth career
- 2004–2011: Aston Villa

Senior career*
Years	Team	Apps	(Gls)
2011–2013	Aston Villa	26	(0)
2013–2015	Everton	14	(0)
2015–2017	Notts County	12	(0)
2017–2019	Yeovil Town	44	(0)
2019–2023	Brighton & Hove Albion	65	(0)
2023–	West Ham United	7	(0)

International career^{‡}
2010	England U17	1	(0)
2011–2012	England U19	4	(0)
2014–2017	England U23	3	(0)
2022–	Republic of Ireland	1	(0)
- * Club domestic league appearances and goals as of 11:56, 27 May 2026 (UTC) ‡ National team caps and goals as of 4 May 2026

Megan Laura Walsh (born 12 November 1994) is a professional footballer who plays as a goalkeeper for Women's Super League club West Ham United and the Republic of Ireland national team.

Walsh is a product of the Aston Villa academy. She played internationally for England at all youth levels up to the under-23 side but declared for the Republic of Ireland in November 2021, for whom she is qualified by paternal descent.

== Club career ==
Walsh made her league debut against Birmingham City on 4 September 2013.

Walsh made her league debut against Manchester City on 23 March 2016.

Following the demise of Notts County in Spring 2017, Walsh signed for Yeovil Town for the rest of the FA WSL Spring Series. She made her league debut against Bristol City on 3 May 2017. Walsh signed a contract extension on 16 August 2017.

In July 2019, following Yeovil's relegation to the FA Women's National League South, Walsh remained in the WSL after signing for Brighton & Hove Albion. She made her league debut against Bristol City on 7 September 2019. Walsh signed a contract extension on 9 January 2020, extending her stay till 2021. She signed another contract extension on 6 May 2021, extending her stay until 2023, at which point she departed from the club.

Walsh was announced at West Ham on 18 August 2023. She made her league debut against Arsenal on 26 November 2023.

== International career ==
Walsh represented Great Britain at the 2017 Summer Universiade.

After representing England at youth levels between 2010 and 2020, it was announced that Walsh had changed her international allegiances to Ireland, eligible through her Wexford-born grandfather, having failed to receive a call up for the England senior team. She was called up for Ireland's Women's World Cup qualifiers against Slovakia and Georgia. Walsh earned her first cap for Ireland on 19 February 2022 in a 1–0 defeat by Russia at the 2022 Pinatar Cup.

Walsh was called up for the 2023 FIFA Women's World Cup.

== Career statistics ==
=== Club ===
As of match played 16 May 2026

Appearances and goals by club, season and competition
Club	Season	League			National cup (Note: Includes Women's FA Cup)		League cup (Note: Includes FA Women's Premier League Cup, FA Women's League Cup)		Total	
Club	Season	Division	Apps	Goals	Apps	Goals	Apps	Goals	Apps	Goals
Aston Villa	2010–11	Women's Premier League	1	0	?	?	0	0	1	0
Aston Villa	2011–12	Women's Premier League	14	0	?	?	2	0	16	0
Aston Villa	2012–13	Women's Premier League	11	0	?	?	5	0	16	0
Aston Villa	Total		26	0	?	?	7	0	33	0
Everton	2013	Women's Super League	2	0	?	?	0	0	2	0
Everton	2014	Women's Super League	3	0	?	?	4	0	7	0
Everton	2015	Women's Super League 2	9	0	?	?	1	0	10	0
Everton	Total		14	0	?	?	5	0	19	0
Notts County	2016	Women's Super League	12	0	?	?	2	0	14	0
Yeovil Town	2017	Women's Super League	6	0	0	0	—		6	0
Yeovil Town	2017–18	Women's Super League	18	0	1	0	1	0	20	0
Yeovil Town	2018–19	Women's Super League	20	0	1	0	3	0	24	0
Yeovil Town	Total		44	0	2	0	4	0	50	0
Brighton & Hove Albion	2019–20	Women's Super League	15	0	1	0	0	0	16	0
Brighton & Hove Albion	2020–21	Women's Super League	15	0	2	0	0	0	17	0
Brighton & Hove Albion	2021–22	Women's Super League	20	0	1	0	3	0	24	0
Brighton & Hove Albion	2022–23	Women's Super League	15	0	2	0	3	0	20	0
Brighton & Hove Albion	Total		65	0	6	0	6	0	77	0
West Ham United	2023–24	Women's Super League	3	0	0	0	2	0	5	0
West Ham United	2025–26	Women's Super League	4	0	0	0	4	0	8	0
West Ham United	Total		7	0	0	0	6	0	13	0
Career total			165	0	8	0	30	0	206	0

=== International ===
As of match played 26 September 2023

Appearances and goals by national team and year
National team	Year	Apps	Goals
Republic of Ireland	2022	1	0
Total		1	0

== Honours ==
Aston Villa

- FA Women's National League Cup: 2012–13

Individual

- Brighton & Hove Albion Player of the Season: 2021-22
