= Divine Obida =

Footballer (born 2009)

Personal information
- Full name: Divine Ogika Obida
- Date of birth: 31 March 2009 (age 17)
- Position: Midfielder

Team information
- Current team: Everton

Youth career
- Everton

Senior career*
Years	Team	Apps	(Gls)
2025–2026	Wythenshawe		
2026–	Everton	0	(0)

International career^{‡}
2025–	Belgium U17	2	(0)
- * Club domestic league appearances and goals as of 9 November 2026 ‡ National team caps and goals as of 9 November 2026

Divine Ogika Obida (born 31 March 2009) is a footballer who plays as a midfielder for Women's Super League club Everton. She has represented Belgium at the U17 international level.

== Club career ==
=== Early career ===
Obida developed through Everton's youth setup and played senior football for Wythenshawe in the FA Women's National League during the 2025–26 season.

The Football Association's records credit Obida with 18 appearances for Wythenshawe, including eight starts and ten substitute appearances, as well as three goals and two assists. On 14 September 2025, she supplied the cross from which Chelsea Birch scored Wythenshawe's opening goal in a 2–2 draw against Leeds United. She also scored in Wythenshawe's 3–1 victory over Huddersfield Town on 26 April 2026.

=== Everton ===
Obida progressed through Everton's academy and represented the club at under-21 level. On 28 October 2026, she made her Everton senior first-team debut as an 87th-minute substitute for Rion Ishikawa in a 2–1 win against Sheffield United in the WSL Players Cup. Wearing the number 46 shirt, she made her debut in the same match as fellow academy graduate Amy Pracy.

== International career ==
Obida represented the Belgium national team at under-17 level. Soccerdonna records her Belgium U17 debut on 28 September 2025 and credits her with two appearances.

On 15 January 2026, she appeared for Belgium U17 in an international friendly against the United States U16 in Valencia, Spain. Obida entered at half-time, replacing Fien Vanoverschelde.

== Career statistics ==
As recorded by The Football Association for Wythenshawe in the 2025–26 season:

Season	Club	Appearances	Goals	Assists
2025–26	Wythenshawe	18	3	2

The figures are from the FA's published player table for the season; they do not include Everton academy or senior first-team matches. As of 9 November 2026, Obida had made one senior cup appearance for Everton but no Women's Super League appearances.
