= Amy Pracy =

English professional footballer (born 2009)

Personal information
- Date of birth: 3 June 2009 (age 17)
- Position: Forward

Team information
- Current team: Everton

Youth career
- Everton

Senior career*
Years	Team	Apps	(Gls)
2025–2026	Wythenshawe		
2026–	Everton	0	(0)
- * Club domestic league appearances and goals as of 5 November 2026

Amy Pracy (born 3 June 2009) is an English professional footballer who plays as a forward for Women's Super League club Everton. A product of Everton's academy, she gained senior football experience in the FA Women's National League before making her Everton first-team debut in October 2026.

== Club career ==
=== Early career ===
Pracy developed through the youth system of Everton and played senior football for Wythenshawe in the FA Women's National League during the 2025–26 season.

According to records published by The Football Association, Pracy made 21 appearances for Wythenshawe across recorded competitions, including nine starts and 12 substitute appearances. She scored two goals and recorded three assists.

On 16 November 2025, Pracy scored Wythenshawe's second goal in a 2–0 league victory against Blackburn Rovers. Her goal came from a curling strike in the second half, securing the three points for Wythenshawe.

On 5 April 2026, she appeared as a half-time substitute for Wythenshawe in a 2–1 defeat against Leeds United in the FA Women's National League Division One North, replacing Panther Espinoza.

=== Everton ===
Pracy represented Everton at under-21 level before progressing to the senior first team.

On 18 March 2026, she scored for Everton's under-21 side in a Liverpool Senior Women's County Cup semi-final against Liverpool Feds at Walton Hall Park. Pracy opened the scoring in the 16th minute, converting from a narrow angle after a corner, although Everton were subsequently defeated 3–1.

On 28 October 2026, Pracy made her senior first-team debut for Everton in a 2–1 victory against Sheffield United in the WSL Players Cup. Wearing the number 50 shirt, she entered the match in the 77th minute as a substitute for Noémie Mouchon.

Three minutes after entering the match, Pracy registered her first shot for Everton's senior side, a right-footed attempt from outside the penalty area that was saved by the Sheffield United goalkeeper.

The match also marked the first-team debut of fellow Everton academy graduate Divine Obida, who entered as a substitute in the 87th minute.

== Career statistics ==
As of 5 November 2026, the Football Association records the following statistics for Pracy's 2025–26 season with Wythenshawe across its listed competitions.

Season	Club	Appearances	Goals	Assists
2025–26	Wythenshawe	21	2	3

Statistics include competitions recorded by the Football Association and are not restricted to league appearances.
