= Nicola Cousins =

Welsh footballer (born 1988)

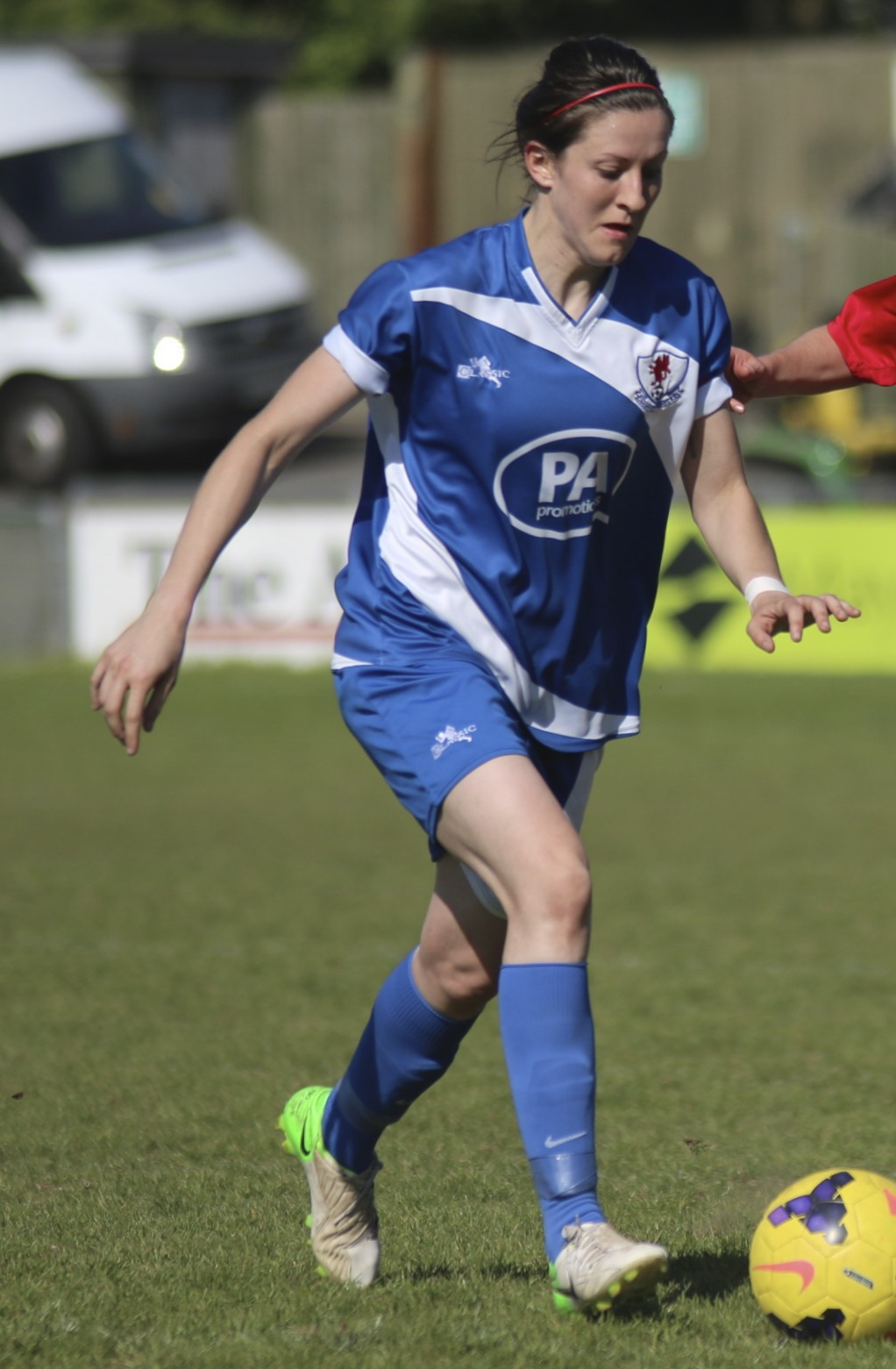
- Cousins playing for Cardiff City in 2014

Personal information
- Full name: Nicola Jayne Cousins
- Date of birth: 22 October 1988 (age 38)
- Place of birth: Cardiff, Wales
- Position: Defender

Youth career
- Cardiff City

Senior career*
Years	Team	Apps	(Gls)
2004–2014	Cardiff City		
2014–2019	Yeovil Town	67	(8)
2020–2022	Lewes	26	(0)

International career^{‡}
2005–2007	Wales U19	13	(1)
2006–2014	Wales		
- * Club domestic league appearances and goals as of 06:40, 22 May 2018 (UTC) ‡ National team caps and goals as of 15:47, 23 February 2016 (UTC)

Nicola Jayne Cousins (born 22 October 1988) is a footballer who plays as a defender for the Wales national team.

== International career ==
Cousins won 13 caps for Wales at under-19 level, scoring one goal. She then made her senior debut on 23 November 2006 in UEFA Women's Euro 2009 qualifying, in a 2–1 win over Kazakhstan at Stadion Mladost, Strumica.
