= Bethany-May Howard =

English footballer (born 1995)

Personal information
- Date of birth: 6 May 1995 (age 31)
- Place of birth: Bath, England
- Height: 1.70 m (5 ft 7 in)
- Position: Goalkeeper

Team information
- Current team: Oxford
- Number: 1

College career
Years	Team	Apps	(Gls)
2013–2016	Rider Broncs	75	(0)

Senior career*
Years	Team	Apps	(Gls)
2017–2023	Bridgwater United		
2023–2024	Southampton	3	(0)
2024	→ Watford (loan)		
2024–	Oxford United		
- * Club domestic league appearances and goals

Bethany-May Howard (born 6 May 1995) is an English footballer who plays as a goalkeeper for Oxford United W.F.C. She previously played for Bridgwater United W.F.C., Southampton F.C. Women, and Watford.
