= Leah Burridge =

English association football player

Personal information
- Full name: Leah Burridge
- Date of birth: 3 January 1997 (age 29)
- Place of birth: Plymouth, Devon, England
- Positions: Defender; midfielder

Team information
- Current team: Exeter City

Youth career
- 2017: Yeovil Town

Senior career*
Years	Team	Apps	(Gls)
2017–2018	Yeovil Town	18	(0)
2019–2020	→ Plymouth Argyle (loan)	25	(1)
2021–2022	Bridgwater United	12	(1)
2022–2025	Oxford United	0	(0)
2025–	Exeter City	0	(0)
- * Club domestic league appearances and goals as of 23:04, 17 January 2022

Leah Burridge (born 3 January 1997) is an English professional footballer who plays as a midfielder for Exeter City of the Women's National League South.

== Club career ==
=== Yeovil Town ===
In 2015, Burridge made her debut in a 1–0 away win at Oxford United in the WSL Cup. She had to wait a while for her to make her league debut which came in 2017 as a 77th-minute substitute for Natalie Haigh in a 0–0 away draw at Birmingham City in the FA WSL. Burridge successfully broke into the first team in 2017–18, making 17 appearances but not scoring any goals. in the 2018–19, Burridge made 6 appearances before going on loan to Plymouth Argyle.

==== Plymouth Argyle (loan) ====
On 4 January 2019, finding it difficult to stay in the first team, Burridge went on loan to Plymouth Argyle for the remainder of the season joining former Yeovil Town players Natasha Knapman, Helen Bleazard, Jessie Jones and Lindsay Rogers.

=== Oxford United ===
In July 2022, Burridge signed for Oxford United.
