= Jenna Legg =

English association football player (born 1997)

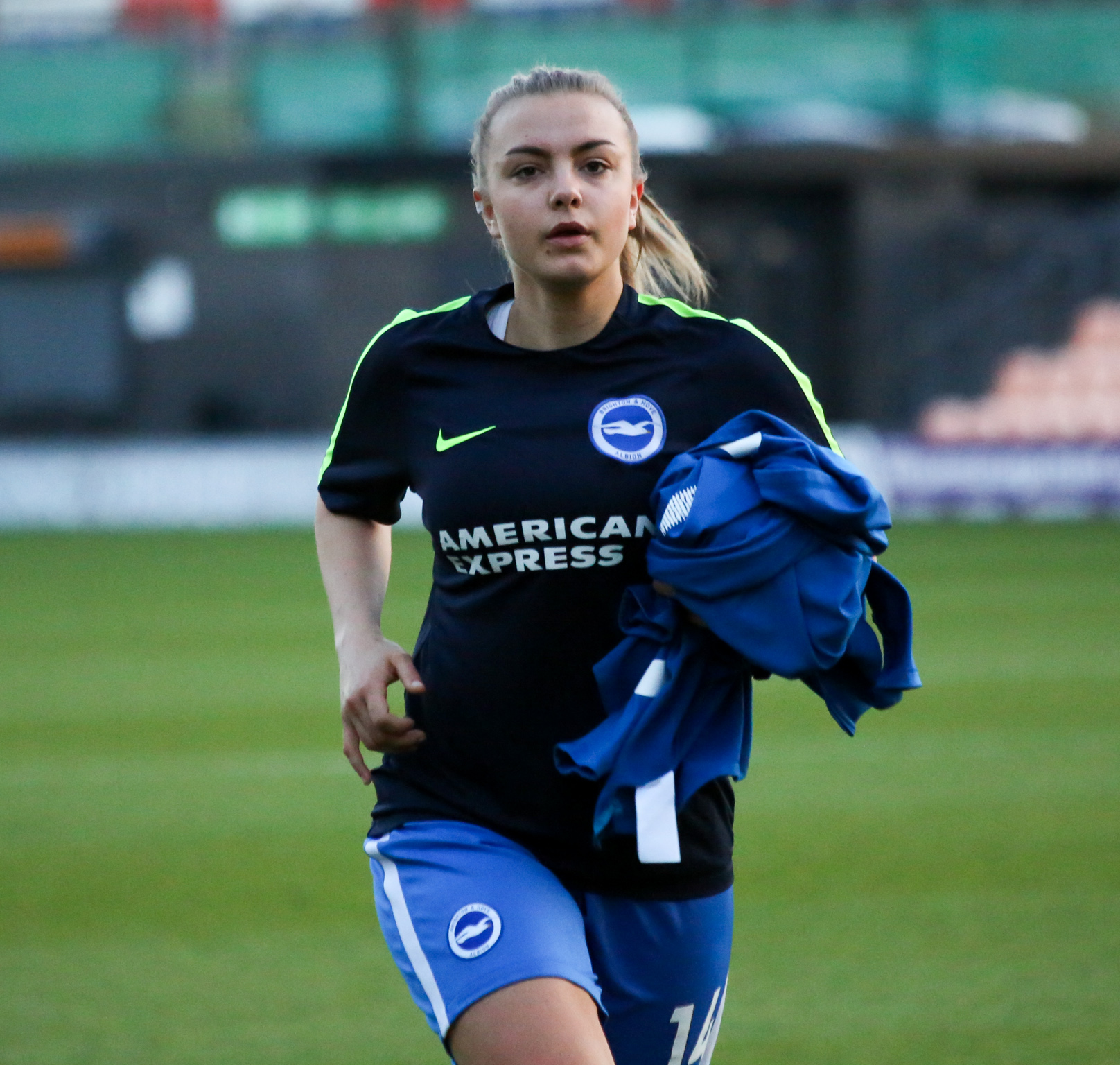
- Legg in April 2018

Personal information
- Full name: Jenna Olivia Legg
- Date of birth: 23 June 1997 (age 29)
- Place of birth: Basingstoke, England
- Position: Midfielder

Team information
- Current team: Oxford United
- Number: 8

Youth career
- Chelsea

Senior career*
Years	Team	Apps	(Gls)
2015–2016	Chelsea	0	(0)
2016	→ Oxford United (loan)		
2017–2019	Brighton & Hove Albion	17	(0)
2019–2021	Charlton Athletic	20	(0)
2021–2023	Watford	16	(1)
2023–	Oxford United		

International career^{‡}
2015–2016	England U19	3	(0)
- * Club domestic league appearances and goals as of 24 November 2024 ‡ National team caps and goals as of 12 February 2019

Jenna Olivia Legg (born 23 June 1997) is an English footballer who plays as a midfielder for Oxford United in the FA Women's National League South.

== Club career ==
Legg emerged from Chelsea's Centre of Excellence to join the first team for the 2016 FA WSL season. In July 2016 Chelsea sent Legg and teammate Laura Rafferty on loan to Oxford United. Legg and Rafferty both signed for Brighton & Hove Albion ahead of the FA WSL Spring Series.

In March 2019, Legg left Brighton by mutual consent and was praised by the team's coach Hope Powell: "Jenna leaves the club having played a huge part in our recent success, and her contribution will not be forgotten."

On 22 August 2019, Legg signed with FA Women's Championship team Charlton Athletic, before moving to Watford in 2021. She signed for Oxford United in February 2023.

== International career ==
Legg played for the England women's national under-19 football team at the 2015 UEFA Women's Under-19 Championship in Israel.
