= Sarah Wiltshire =

Welsh footballer (born 1991)

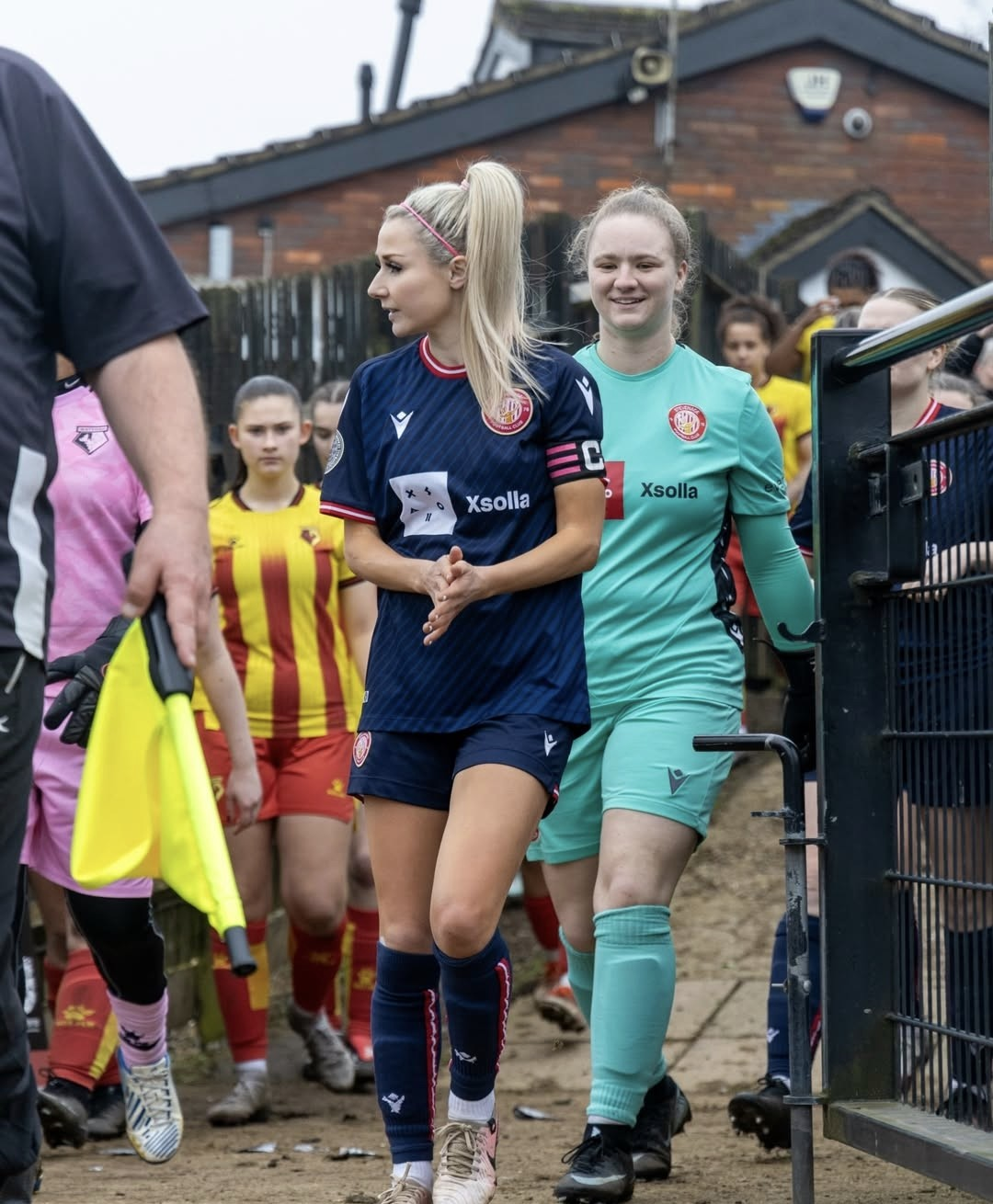

Personal information
- Full name: Sarah Frances Wiltshire
- Date of birth: 7 July 1991 (age 35)
- Place of birth: England
- Positions: Forward; midfielder

Team information
- Current team: Stevenage FC
- Number: 7

Youth career
- Arsenal

Senior career*
Years	Team	Apps	(Gls)
2007–2008	Arsenal	1	(0)
2008–2014	Watford	89	(38)
2013–2014	→ Cardiff City Ladies (loan)	10	(15)
2014–2015	Yeovil Town	11	(10)
2014	→ Cardiff City Ladies (loan)	2	(2)
2015	Manchester City	1	(0)
2015–2017	Yeovil Town	26	(16)
2017	→ Cambridge United (loan)	7	(6)
2017–2019	Tottenham Hotspur	36	(13)
2019–2020	Yeovil Town	13	(15)
2020–2022	Watford	9	(7)
2022–2025	Cambridge United		
2025–	Stevenage	26	(44)

International career^{‡}
2007–2008	England U17	3	(2)
2012–2015	Wales	31	(8)
- * Club domestic league appearances and goals as of 9 August 2024 ‡ National team caps and goals as of 9 August 2024

Sarah Frances Wiltshire (born 7 July 1991) is a professional footballer who plays for Stevenage FC Women and previously played for Wales as a midfielder or forward.

== Club career ==
Wiltshire made her first team debut for Arsenal as a 15-year old against Leeds, in April 2007.

On 12 July 2014, Wiltshire signed for fellow FA WSL 2 side Yeovil Town from Watford Ladies.

On 5 January 2015, Wiltshire left Yeovil Town to sign a professional contract with FA WSL 1 side Manchester City, having scored 10 goals in just 11 league games in her short time with Yeovil. Wiltshire only made one appearance for Manchester City before re-signing for Yeovil in June 2015.

In July 2016, Wiltshire announced that she was taking a temporary break from football, due to pregnancy. Wiltshire returned to Yeovil in April 2017 ahead of the FA WSL Spring Series.

On 11 July 2017, Wiltshire left Yeovil due to her inability to commit to traveling to training and subsequently she signed for newly promoted WSL 2 side Tottenham Hotspur. In her second season with the team, a second-place finish in the 2018–19 FA Women's Championship meant Spurs won promotion to the WSL. However, in July 2019, Wiltshire was one of 11 players released by the club ahead of their debut season as a top flight professional team.

Wiltshire subsequently returned for a third spell at Yeovil Town, playing in the FA Women's National League South. After Yeovil Town she spent two seasons with Watford, returning to the club for the first time since 2014. After her time at Watford, she signed for Cambridge United in August 2022, returning for the first time since her loan to the club in 2017.

== International career ==
A youth international with England, Wiltshire played for Wales at the senior level from 2012 until her last cap in 2015.
