= Oxford United W.F.C. =

Coordinates: 51°46′26.09″N 1°13′39.91″W

Oxford United Women
- Full name: Oxford United Women's Football Club
- Nickname: U's / Yellows
- Founded: 1991; 35 years ago
- Ground: Marsh Lane, Oxford
- Capacity: 2,000
- Manager: Liam Gilbert
- League: FA Women's National League South
- 2025–26: FA Women's National League South, 4th of 12
- Website: oufc.co.uk/women

Oxford United Women's Football Club is an English women's football club affiliated with Oxford United, and founded as Oxford Ladies F.C. in the 1991–92 season. Although there were earlier women's football clubs playing in the Oxfordshire area with an Oxford name, the 1991–92 season represents the inaugural season of Oxford Ladies F.C., which would go on to be formally affiliated to Oxford United F.C. just one year later. On affiliation to the men's club before the 1992–93 football season, Oxford Ladies changed their name to Oxford United Ladies to maintain a one-club ethos. Whilst initially playing at Witney Town's Marriotts Stadium, the first women's football match played at The Manor Ground was against Horsham Ladies F.C. on 25 October 1992 and this was also the first Oxford United women's team match to be televised on Central Television.

The success of Oxford United Women's F.C. is recognised and promoted by Oxford United.

== History ==
For the 1991–92 season, due to the strength of the playing squad, the women's team were elected directly into the Women's FA Southern Region Women's Football League Division 1 (then the third tier of English women's football) just one step below the Women's FA National League, which they won at the first attempt, losing only one league match in the entire season. They also reached the Women's FA Southern Region Women's Football League League Cup final. The final was played against Red Star Southampton Ladies Reserves. At full time and after extra-time, the League Cup final score was level, with Red Star going on to win the penalty shootout by 4 goals to 3. In the Women's FA Cup, Oxford Ladies reached the third round, losing narrowly at home to Frome Ladies by 3 goals to 2. On top of these successes, Oxford Ladies won the Women's FA Southern Region Women's Football League 5 A Side Tournament, together with 4 other regional 5 A Side tournaments.

In the 1992–93 season the team were promoted to the Women's FA National League Southern Section, which was the second tier in English women's football at the time (jointly with Women's FA National League Northern Section) and the club's name officially became Oxford United Ladies. The club was now eligible for the Women's FA National League Cup, but found the competition much tougher, losing in the first round to Epsom & Ewell Ladies by 2 goals to 1. They fared better in the Women's FA Cup, reaching the fourth round before losing to Rainworth Miners Welfare Ladies, by 2 goals to 0. In the league, a mid-table finish represented strong consolidation having reached such a high level in a very short period of time. The club found some further successes in winning three regional 5-a-side tournaments, and a 6-a-side tournament held in Milton Keynes.

In 1993–94 the club's name officially changed to Oxford United Women F.C.

In 1994-95 the Women's FA passed control of its competitions to the Football Association with competition titles changing from "Women's FA" to "FA Women's".

In 1995–96, the league changed its name to FA Women's Premier League Southern Division, in which Oxford finished in 3rd place, as well as reaching the semi-final of the FA Women's Premier League Cup, and again reaching the fourth round of the Women's FA Cup, losing at St Helens Garswood Ladies by 2 goals to 1.

After a number of turbulent years, whilst much development occurred in women's football, the club re-emerged as Oxford United Ladies in the 2005–06 season, playing in the Thames Valley Counties League Division 1, which they won at the first attempt. They were also winners of the Thames Valley Counties League Cup and Oxfordshire FA Women's Cup. As a result, the first team were promoted to the Southern Region Women's Football League Division 1 for the 2006–07 season, and the Reserves rose to the Thames Valley Counties League Division 1, with a third Development side playing in Thames Valley Counties League Division 2.

The first team then floated between the Southern Region Division 1 and Southern Region Premier Division for the next few seasons, but by 2011–12 the club won the Southern Region Women's Football League Premier Division and were again promoted in 2012–13 where they won the South-West Combination and were elected as inaugural members of the Women's Super League 2nd division (WSL 2).

Oxford United Ladies won the Ladies Oxfordshire Senior Cup, beating Henley Town Ladies 2–1 at Bicester Town F.C.

On 25 June 2025, the club announced that as part of its plan to professionalise it was adopting a hybrid-professional model, moving from part-time evening training to a regime of three sessions in the afternoon each week.

== Current squad ==
As of 28 September 2026

Note: Flags indicate national team as defined under FIFA eligibility rules; some limited exceptions apply. Players may hold more than one non-FIFA nationality.

No.	Pos.	Nation	Player
1	GK	ENG	Beth Wookey
2	DF	ENG	Nicola Gibson
3	DF	ENG	Shelly Provan
4	MF	ENG	Kate Wiseman
5	DF	GRN	Naomi Bedeau
6	DF	ENG	Riva Casley
8	MF	ENG	Ellie-Mae Richardson
9	FW	ENG	Emma Thompson
10	MF	ENG	Jenna Legg (captain)
11	MF	ENG	Ruby Sealey
12	DF	WAL	Shaunna Jenkins

No.	Pos.	Nation	Player
15	FW	ENG	Lucy Powis
17	FW	ENG	Olivia Smith
18	MF	ENG	Grace Palmer
19	GK	POL	Olivia Sieradzka
20	DF	ENG	Maddie Brant
21	DF	ENG	Maisy Barker
22	FW	ENG	Sophie Quirk
24	FW	ENG	Alice Bussey
27	DF	ENG	Belle Rowden
28	MF	ENG	Eva Burgess
30	MF	ENG	Holly Manders

== Coaching staff ==
As of 19 November 2025.

Position	Name
Manager	Liam Gilbert
Assistant Manager	Shaun Green

== Honours ==
- South-West Combination: Winners

2012–13

- Thames Valley Division Two: Winners

2009–10

- Oxfordshire FA County Cup : Runners up

2009–10

- Southern Region Division One :Runners up

2008–09

- Southern Region Division One: 1

2006–07

- Thames Valley Division One: 1

2005–06

- Thames Valley League Cup: 1

2005–06

- Oxfordshire FA County Cup: 1

2005–06
