= Bridgwater United W.F.C. =

Coordinates: 51°7′55″N 2°59′22″W

Bridgwater United Women's Football Club
- Full name: Bridgwater United Women's Football Club
- Nickname: The Robins
- Founded: 1990 (as Yetminster Ladies)
- Ground: The Hand Stadium, Clevedon
- Capacity: 3,500 (300 seated)
- Chairman: Tony McCarthy & Mike Kushner
- Head Coach: Steve Perkins
- League: FA Women's National League Division One South West
- 2025–26: FA Women's National League Division One South West, 3rd of 12

Bridgwater United Women's Football Club are an English women's association football club based in Bridgwater, Somerset who were previously known as Yetminster Ladies, Sherborne Ladies, Yeovil Town Ladies and Yeovil United. Founded in 1990, they now play in the FA Women's National League Division One South West.

Following promotion in 2016, the club competed at the top flight of English football in the Women's Super League during the 2017 and 2018–2019 seasons. In 2021, the team merged with men's side Bridgwater Town to become Bridgwater United, but separated in 2024 to become an independent women's club under the same name.

== History ==
The team was formed by Tony Baverstock as Yetminster Ladies, and originally competed in South West League Division Two, the club's first game was against Weymouth Vikings on 16 September 1990. The club was renamed Sherborne Ladies in 1993, and in 1997 the team reached the 4th Round of the Women's FA Cup, finally going out to Everton in front of a crowd of over 500 at Huish Park. The team was renamed Yeovil Town Ladies in 1999, and progressed well under the management of John Flatters. After Flatters departed the club, first team coach Steve Phelps took over.

The 2004–05 season saw Yeovil Town Ladies win the Somerset County Cup Final against Keynsham Town Ladies, with the end of this season also seeing the departure of young talent Helen Bleazard, who had been playing for Yeovil since the age of nine. Bleazard left to play for Bristol City Ladies, who at the time were playing in the Women's Premier League. The following season saw the team missing out on league promotion to Frome Town by one point, leaving them in the League runner's up position, and losing League Cup finalists. The 2006–07 season saw the Glovers at last seal promotion to the South West Combination League.

The club embarked upon its first season back up in the South West Combination in 2007–08. It was another good campaign too, with the team acclimatising well to their new status and gaining a very respectable fourth-place finish. The 2008–09 season again saw fine progress, Yeovil Town footballer Nathan Jones joined as first team coach in November 2009. Yeovil finished the season third, behind league champions Queens Park Rangers and second place Plymouth Argyle. The Reserves finished the season as League champions, gaining promotion to the South West League, Division One.

The following season saw the team hit the headlines following a 21–0 victory over Reading Town in the August. This inspired them to race to the top of the league with a 9–1 win over Cullompton, a hard-fought victory at Forest Green Rovers and a 2–2 draw at Havant & Waterlooville. The season was disrupted by poor weather for almost four months, but this allowed the team to concentrate on the FA Cup, with victories over Saltash United, Forest Green Rovers and Newquay taking them to an exciting fourth round tie with Norwich City, a game that saw them come out 3–0 winners, setting up a tie with Nottingham Forest. They lost this narrowly 1–0, but clearly showed their higher league promise. The team won the South West Combination Women's League, having won seventeen, drawn one and lost just two of their twenty matches, scoring 103 goals, conceding just fifteen.

The 2010–11 season saw the club competing in FA Women's Premier League Southern Division for the first time; however, they found themselves relegated back to the South West Combination at the end of the season after a brave battle. They however fared better in the county cup, getting through to the final thanks to a 3–1 victory over Keynsham Town. March 2011 saw the departure of the long serving first team manager Steve Phelps and his assistant manager Nigel Wolfe from their positions at the club. Steve cited work and personal commitments for his resignation.

Nigel Williams and Sarah Lawler took over as joint managers of the first team, with Chris White installed as assistant manager. They initially steadied the ship with draws against Cardiff City and Colchester United, but defeats against West Ham United and Portsmouth in their final two matches confirmed the return to the South West Combination. The season ended with a 3–0 win over Larkhall Athletic in the final of the Somerset Women's Senior Cup.

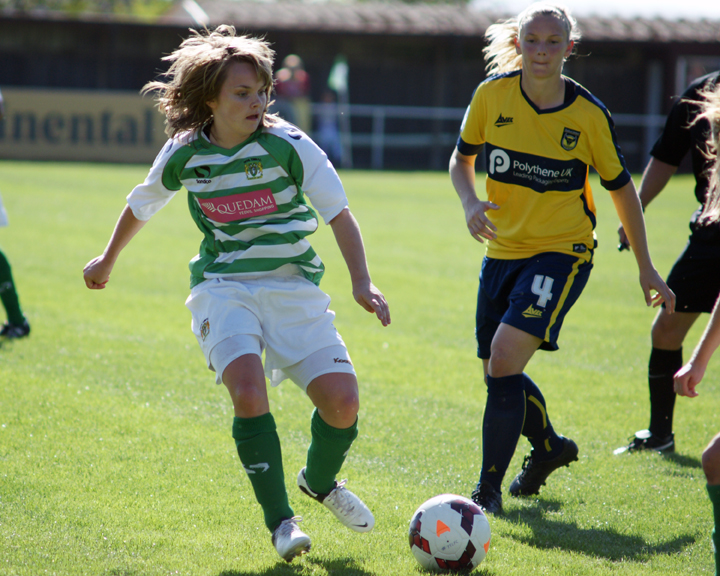
Yeovil Town playing Oxford United in 2014

The 2011–12 season was the first full season under the tenure of the new joint first team managers saw two trophies won by the senior squad, with the lifting of both the South West Women's Combination Football League Trophy and the Somerset FA Women's Senior Cup. The club also had the honour of being awarded the FA National Respect Gold award for the English ladies football pyramid. The start of the season saw the departure from the club of the long serving and record goal scorer Jemma Tewkesbury, who moved to Portsmouth Ladies, but the league campaign starting with a 7–1 victory over Keynsham Development and this set the precedent for the season, with the girls staying unbeaten in the league throughout. The county cup campaign started well with a 1–0 win over Keynsham Town. The girls received a bye to the final, where they beat Larkhall Athletic 3–0 to lift the trophy for the second consecutive season. The girls were crowned champions in April, with two games to spare, confirming promotion back to the FA Women's Premier League Southern Division at the first time of asking.

The 2012–13 season saw the club finish 3rd in the Premier League Southern Division, their highest ever finishing position, and reached the 5th round of the FA Women's Cup before losing 4–0 to Leeds United. In April 2013, it was confirmed that the club had been accepted in to the new expanded FA WSL Division 2. Yeovil was named FAWSL 2 Club of the Year in 2014, where they finished fourth in the league with 22 points. They once again finished fourth in 2015, this time with 31 points. The 2016 season saw Yeovil win promotion to FA WSL 1, winning the WSL Division 2. They also won FAWSL 2 Club of the year for a second time.

Their entry into the top flight of English women's football came during the 2017 spring series, a series created to shift women's football calendar from a summer to a winter league. While they finished last in the spring series, this series saw no promotion or relegation before the 2017–2018 season which started in September 2017. They subsequently finished last during this 2017–18 season but remained in the FA WSL through the FA club licensing application process.

In March 2019, the club was reported to have entered administration. They were deducted 10 points during the 2018–19 season, finishing 15 points adrift and getting relegated. However, in May 2019, they were denied an operating licence for the Championship and would have to contest the following season as a third tier club instead. In June 2019, owner Steve Allinson announced his intention to relinquish ownership of the team free of charge in order to find investors capable of sustaining the team.

In July 2019, Yeovil Town's ownership was successfully transferred to Adam Murry who took control of A.F.C. Bournemouth men's team when they went into administration. Murry promptly promoted Academy Head Coach Jamie Phillip to the senior position and rebranded the team, changing from Yeovil Town Ladies to Yeovil Town Women and creating a new team badge. Yeovil began the season strongly but faltered a few games in and Jamie Philip left the club by mutual consent. The appointment of former manager, Jamie Sherwood, was confirmed in November 2020. In March 2020, the 2019–20 season was cancelled in response to the COVID-19 pandemic with Yeovil sitting in 5th place. In late summer of 2020, the board of directors elected a new chair of the board in Sarah Murry and underwent a further name change in September, rebranding as Yeovil United FC.

In March 2021, Yeovil United merged with men's club Bridgwater Town, forming Bridgwater United. In January 2023, Yeovil Town W.F.C. was then re-formed.

In April 2023, following a 4–0 defeat at London Bees, Bridgwater United Women were relegated from the Southern Premier Division of the FA Women's National League.

In April 2025, the club once again won the Somerset Senior Women's County Cup, following a 2–1 victory over Keynsham Town Ladies.

== Players ==
=== Current squad ===
As of 12 June 2025.

Note: Flags indicate national team as defined under FIFA eligibility rules; some limited exceptions apply. Players may hold more than one non-FIFA nationality.

No.	Pos.	Nation	Player
1	GK	ENG	Ellie Mitchell
2	DF	ENG	Ella-Mae Miller
3	DF	ENG	Libby Gimson
4	MF	ENG	Keeley Banfield
5	DF	ENG	Manfy Sharpe
6	MF	ENG	Hana Bennett
8	MF	ENG	Ellie-Mae Bell
9	FW	ENG	Faith Bedford
10	MF	ENG	Daniella Tyson

No.	Pos.	Nation	Player
11	DF	ENG	Gracie Owen
12	DF	ENG	Grace Phillips
13	GK	ENG	Emma Ayers
14	FW	ENG	Hollie Tappin
15	FW	ENG	Connie Pengelly
17	DF	ENG	Jess Smith
18	MF	ENG	Grace Clark
19	FW	ENG	Kayleigh Spiers
20	FW	ENG	Abbie Carslake

== Backroom staff ==
=== Management ===
Position	Staff
General Manager	(England) Trevor Jenkins
Director of Football	(England) Jamie Sherwood
Head Coach	(England) Steve Perkins
Head of Youth	(United States) Samantha Cox
Goalkeeping Coach	(England) Steve Phillips
Sports Therapist	(England) Naomi Patten
Sports Science Data Analyst	(England) Hannah Stephens

== Honours ==
FA WSL 2

- Winners (1): 2016

South West Combination

- Winners (2): 2009–10, 2011–12

Somerset FA Women's Senior Cup

- Winners (4): 2004–05, 2010–11, 2011–12, 2012–13, 2024-25
