= 2020–21 Brighton & Hove Albion W.F.C. season =

Brighton & Hove Albion
2020–21 season
- Chairman: Tony Bloom
- Manager: Hope Powell
- Stadium: Broadfield Stadium, Crawley
- WSL: 6th
- FA Cup: Semi-final
- League Cup: Group stage
- Top goalscorer: League: Inessa Kaagman (8); All: Inessa Kaagman (9)
Home colours	Away colours	Third colours

The 2020–21 Brighton & Hove Albion W.F.C. season was the club's 30th season in existence and their third in the FA Women's Super League, the highest level of the football pyramid. Along with competing in the WSL, the club also contested two domestic cup competitions: the FA Cup and the League Cup.

== Summary ==
On 6 September, Brighton played Birmingham in their opening match of the season in what was their first league match in 6 months. The Seagulls won 2–0 at home with goals from Megan Connolly and Inessa Kaagman. On 27 September, Brighton played Birmingham again, this time coming in the quarter-final of the 2019–20 FA Cup in which they lost on penalties. The cup overlapped the new season due to the postponements as a result of the COVID-19 pandemic. Brighton's first defeat of the campaign came on the 4 October in their third league game, a 3–0 away loss against Manchester United. In the 2–2 away draw at Everton on 18 October, Kayleigh Green was seen to be shown two yellow cards by referee Lucy Oliver but was not sent off, baffling Toffees manager Willie Kirk.

Brighton reached the semi-final of the 2020–21 FA Cup where they were defeated 3–0 away at Arsenal on 31 October 2021, after Coronavirus delayed the tournament into the next season.

== Squad ==
As of 5 February 2021.

Note: Flags indicate national team as defined under FIFA eligibility rules; some limited exceptions apply. Players may hold more than one non-FIFA nationality.

No.	Pos.	Nation	Player
1	GK	ENG	Megan Walsh
2	DF	ENG	Bethan Roe
3	DF	ENG	Felicity Gibbons
4	DF	ENG	Danielle Bowman (captain)
5	DF	NED	Danique Kerkdijk
6	DF	ENG	Maya Le Tissier
7	FW	ENG	Aileen Whelan
8	MF	IRL	Megan Connolly
9	FW	KOR	Lee Geum-min (on loan from Manchester City)
10	MF	NED	Inessa Kaagman
11	MF	FIN	Nora Heroum
12	DF	FIN	Emma Koivisto
13	DF	NZL	Rebekah Stott

No.	Pos.	Nation	Player
15	FW	WAL	Kayleigh Green
16	FW	ENG	Ellie Brazil
19	MF	ENG	Emily Simpkins
20	DF	ENG	Victoria Williams
21	MF	ENG	Jodie Brett
22	MF	ENG	Katie Robinson
23	FW	IRL	Rianna Jarrett
24	MF	ENG	Maisie Symonds
25	GK	NOR	Cecilie Fiskerstrand
26	MF	ENG	Hollie Olding
29	FW	ENG	Faith Nokuthula
32	MF	ENG	Libby Bance

== Pre-season ==
7 August 2020 Friendly	Brighton & Hove Albion	2–2	Leicester City	Burton upon Trent
	Kaagman; Gibbons	Report		Stadium: St George's Park; Attendance: Behind-closed-doors

13 August 2020 Friendly	Arsenal	–	Brighton & Hove Albion	London Colney
		Report		Stadium: Arsenal Training Centre; Attendance: Behind-closed-doors
Note: No official scoreline released

16 August 2020 Friendly	Liverpool	–	Brighton & Hove Albion	Birkenhead
				Stadium: Prenton Park; Attendance: Behind-closed-doors
Note: No official scoreline released

== FA Women's Super League ==
=== Results summary ===
Overall								Home						Away					
Pld	W	D	L	GF	GA	GD	Pts	W	D	L	GF	GA	GD	W	D	L	GF	GA	GD
22	8	3	11	21	41	−20	27	5	0	6	11	24	−13	3	3	5	10	17	−7

Last updated: 9 May 2021.
Source: FA WSL

=== Results by matchday ===
Round	1	2	3	4	5	6	7	8	9	10	11	12	13	14	15	16	17	18	19	20	21	22
Ground	H	A	A	H	A	H	A	A	H	H	A	H	A	A	H	H	A	H	H	A	A	H
Result	W	D	L	L	D	L	W	L	L	L	D	L	L	W	W	W	W	L	W	L	L	W
Position	3	5	7	7	8	8	8	8	9	9	9	9	9	8	7	7	6	6	6	6	7	6

A = Away; H = Home; W = Win; D = Draw; L = Loss

=== Results ===
6 September 2020 1	Brighton & Hove Albion	2–0	Birmingham City	Crawley
14:00	Connolly 58'; Kaagman 60'	Report	Holloway (yellow card) 66'; Scott (yellow card) 71'; Napier (yellow card) 81'; Mayling (yellow card) 90+1'	Stadium: Broadfield Stadium; Attendance: Behind-closed-doors; Referee: Rob Whitton

13 September 2020 2	Manchester City	0–0	Brighton & Hove Albion	Manchester
14:00		Report	Bowman (yellow card) 38'	Stadium: Academy Stadium; Attendance: Behind-closed-doors; Referee: Helen Conley

4 October 2020 3	Manchester United	3–0	Brighton & Hove Albion	Leigh
12:00	Toone 9' (pen.); Russo 67'; Press (yellow card) 78'; Ross 90+2'	Report	Le Tissier (yellow card) 9'; Green (yellow card) 45+5'; Kerkdijk (yellow card) 90+1'	Stadium: Leigh Sports Village; Attendance: Behind-closed-doors; Referee: Elliot Swallow

11 October 2020 4	Brighton & Hove Albion	0–5	Arsenal	Crawley
12:30		Report	Miedema 10', 90+3'; Van de Donk 36'; Beattie 48'; Wubben-Moy 82'	Stadium: Broadfield Stadium; Attendance: Behind-closed-doors; Referee: Kirsty Dowle

18 October 2020 5	Everton	2–2	Brighton & Hove Albion	Liverpool
13:00	Christiansen 28'; Gauvin 71'	Report	Sevecke 9' (o.g.); Le Tissier (yellow card) 45+1'; Green (yellow card) 48'; Whelan 78'	Stadium: Walton Hall Park; Attendance: Behind-closed-doors; Referee: Lucy Oliver

8 November 2020 6	Brighton & Hove Albion	0–2	Aston Villa	Crawley
14:00	Simpkins (yellow card) 68'; Kerkdijk (yellow card) 82'; Bowman (yellow card) 84'; Connolly (yellow card) 88'	Report	Asante 59'; Hutton (yellow card) 71'; Petzelberger 90+2'	Stadium: Broadfield Stadium; Attendance: Behind-closed-doors; Referee: Stacey Pearson

15 November 2020 7	West Ham United	0–1	Brighton & Hove Albion	Dagenham
12:30		Report	Green (yellow card) 44'; Jarrett 69'	Stadium: Victoria Road; Attendance: Behind-closed-doors; Referee: Abigail Byrne

6 December 2020 8	Tottenham Hotspur	3–1	Brighton & Hove Albion	Canons Park
14:00	Harrop 11'; Kennedy (yellow card) 32'; Addison 63'; Morgan 84' (pen.); Percival (yellow card) 90+5'	Report	Williams (yellow card) 8'; Kaagman 33' (pen.)	Stadium: The Hive

13 December 2020 9	Brighton & Hove Albion	0–1	Chelsea	Crawley
14:00		Report	Kerr 21'	Stadium: Broadfield Stadium; Attendance: 457; Referee: Lisa Benn

20 December 2020 10	Brighton & Hove Albion	1–3	Reading	Crawley
14:00	Kaagman 21' (pen.); Bowman (yellow card) 55'	Report	Fishlock 17', 44'; Leine (yellow card) 23'; Bartrip (yellow card) 61'; Carter (yellow card) 88'; Rowe 90+1'	Stadium: Broadfield Stadium; Attendance: Behind-closed-doors; Referee: Abigail Byrne

10 January 2021	Bristol City	P–P	Brighton & Hove Albion	Bath
14:00				Stadium: Twerton Park
Note: Postponed due to positive COVID-19 cases in Brighton squad

17 January 2021 11	Birmingham City	0–0	Brighton & Hove Albion	Solihull
14:00		Report	Kerkdijk (yellow card) 64'	Stadium: Damson Park; Attendance: Behind-closed-doors; Referee: Helen Conley

24 January 2021 12	Brighton & Hove Albion	1–7	Manchester City	Lancing
14:00	Jarrett 69'	Report	Weir 12', 16'; Houghton 41', 61'; White 58'; Kelly 73'; Beckie 77'	Stadium: AMEX Elite Football Performance Centre; Attendance: Behind-closed-doors; Referee: Lisa Benn

30 January 2021 13	Bristol City	3–0	Brighton & Hove Albion	Bath
14:00	Daniëls 3'; Salmon 34', 59' (pen.)	Report	Green (red card) 68'; Le Tissier (yellow card) 90+2'	Stadium: Twerton Park; Attendance: Behind-closed-doors; Referee: Lucy Oliver
Note: Rescheduled from 10 January 2021 following positive COVID-19 cases in Brighton squad.

7 February 2021 14	Chelsea	1–2	Brighton & Hove Albion	Kingston upon Thames
14:00	Kerr 5'	Report	Whelan 8'; Connolly 78'; Bance (yellow card) 90+3'	Stadium: Kingsmeadow; Attendance: Behind-closed-doors; Referee: Cristiana Hattersley

10 February 2021 15	Brighton & Hove Albion	1–0	West Ham United	Crawley
19:00	Whelan 31'; Koivisto (yellow card) 33'; Heroum (yellow card) 62'	Report	Svitková (yellow card) 45'; Leon (yellow card) 90+3'	Stadium: Broadfield Stadium; Attendance: Behind-closed-doors; Referee: Isaac Searle

7 March 2021 16	Brighton & Hove Albion	2–0	Tottenham Hotspur	Crawley
14:00	Lee (yellow card) 21'; Connolly (yellow card) 45+3'; Kaagman 61', 74'; Kerkdijk (yellow card) 68'	Report	Worm (yellow card) 77'	Stadium: Broadfield Stadium; Attendance: Behind-closed-doors; Referee: Stacey Pearson

17 March 2021 17	Aston Villa	0–2	Brighton & Hove Albion	Walsall
19:30	Arthur (yellow card) 45+3'; Hutton (yellow card) 65'; Weiß (yellow card) 80'	Report	Whelan 21'; Kaagman 81' (pen.)	Stadium: Bescot Stadium; Attendance: Behind-closed-doors; Referee: Helen Conley

28 March 2021 18	Brighton & Hove Albion	0–5	Everton	Crawley
12:30	Kerkdijk (yellow card) 50'	Report	Christiansen 24' (pen.); Raso 25', 48', 79'; Emslie (yellow card) 38'; Magill 64'; Pattinson (yellow card) 68'	Stadium: Broadfield Stadium; Attendance: Behind-closed-doors; Referee: Cristiana Hattersley

4 April 2021 19	Brighton & Hove Albion	1–0	Manchester United	Crawley
14:00	Kaagman 25' (pen.); Brazil (yellow card) 45'	Report	Thorisdottir (yellow card) 24'	Stadium: Broadfield Stadium; Attendance: Behind-closed-doors; Referee: Abigail Byrne

25 April 2021 20	Arsenal	2–0	Brighton & Hove Albion	Borehamwood
14:00	Nobbs 27', 77'; Roord (yellow card) 73'; Van de Donk (yellow card) 86'	Report		Stadium: Meadow Park; Attendance: Behind-closed-doors; Referee: Lisa Benn

2 May 2021 21	Reading	3–2	Brighton & Hove Albion	Reading
14:00	F. Williams 36' (pen.); Carter 43'; Harding 55'	Report	Lee 44', 45'	Stadium: Madejski Stadium; Attendance: Behind-closed-doors; Referee: Elizabeth Simms

9 May 2021 22	Brighton & Hove Albion	3–1	Bristol City	Crawley
14:30	Le Tissier 7'; Lee 52', (yellow card) 82'; Kaagman 76'; Green (yellow card) 89'	Report	Salmon (yellow card) 45+2'; Harrison 61'	Stadium: Broadfield Stadium; Attendance: Behind-closed-doors; Referee: Amy Fearns

=== League table ===
Pos	Team	Pld	W	D	L	GF	GA	GD	Pts
4	Manchester United	22	15	2	5	44	20	+24	47
5	Everton	22	9	5	8	39	30	+9	32
6	Brighton & Hove Albion	22	8	3	11	21	41	−20	27
7	Reading	22	5	9	8	25	41	−16	24
8	Tottenham Hotspur	22	5	5	12	18	41	−23	20

Source: FA WSL
Rules for classification: 1) Points; 2) Goal difference; 3) Number of goals scored.

== Women's FA Cup ==
As a member of the top two tiers, Brighton will enter the FA Cup in the fourth round proper. Originally scheduled to take place on 31 January 2021, it was delayed due to COVID-19 restrictions. Due to the delay, the competition only reached the fifth round before the end of the season. It resumed at the quarter-final stage the following season on 29 September 2021.

18 April 2021 Fourth round	Brighton & Hove Albion	1–0	Bristol City	Crawley
14:00	Kaagman 64' (pen.)	Report		Stadium: Broadfield Stadium; Attendance: Behind-closed-doors

16 May 2021 Fifth round	Brighton & Hove Albion	6–0	Huddersfield Town	Crawley
12:00	Heroum 16'; Jarrett 26'; Davies 36' (o.g.); Gibbons 65'; Kerkdijk 68', 78'	Report		Stadium: Broadfield Stadium; Attendance: Behind-closed-doors

29 September 2021 Quarter-final	Brighton & Hove Albion	1–0	Charlton Athletic	Crawley
19:00	Gibbons 68'	Report		Stadium: Broadfield Stadium; Referee: Emily Heaslip

31 October 2021 Semi-final	Arsenal	3–0	Brighton & Hove Albion	Borehamwood
16:45	Little 50'; Mead 54'; Williamson 76'		Connolly (yellow card) 74'; Gibbons (yellow card) 80'	Stadium: Meadow Park; Referee: Abigail Byrne

== FA Women's League Cup ==
7 October 2020 Group stage	Brighton & Hove Albion	2–2 (2–4 p)	West Ham United	Crawley
19:30	Le Tissier (yellow card) 12'; Connolly 42'; Kerkdijk (yellow card) 48'; Jarrett 61'	Report	Daly 31'; Flaherty 82'	Stadium: Broadfield Stadium; Attendance: Behind-closed-doors; Referee: Steven Hughes
	Penalties
	Jarrett (penalty missed); Heroum (penalty scored); Williams (penalty scored); Bowman (penalty missed)		(penalty scored) Van Egmond; (penalty scored) Grant; (penalty missed) Daly; (penalty scored) Pacheco; (penalty scored) Lehmann

4 November 2020 Group stage	Charlton Athletic	C–C	Brighton & Hove Albion	Crayford
19:45				Stadium: The Oakwood
Note: Initially postponed following positive COVID-19 test on Brighton staff Fixture was not fulfilled.

18 November 2020 Group stage	Brighton & Hove Albion	0–2	Reading	Crawley
19:30	Simpkins (yellow card) 58'	Report	Harding 28'; Fishlock (yellow card) 41'; Eikeland 73'	Stadium: Broadfield Stadium; Attendance: Behind-closed-doors; Referee: Ryan Atkin

Pos	Team	Pld	W	WPEN	LPEN	L	GF	GA	GD	Pts	Qualification	WHU	REA	BHA	CHA
1	West Ham United	3	2	1	0	0	9	2	+7	8	Advanced to knock-out stage	—	3–0	—	—
2	Reading	3	2	0	0	1	6	3	+3	6	Possible knock-out stage based on ranking	—	—	—	4–0
3	Brighton & Hove Albion	2	0	0	1	1	2	4	−2	1		2–2	0–2	—	—
4	Charlton Athletic	2	0	0	0	2	0	8	−8	0		0–4	—	C–C (Note: Match originally postponed following positive COVID-19 test by Brighton staff. An independent tribunal determined the fixture would not be rescheduled as it would have no effect on qualifying.)	—

Source: thefa.com
Rules for classification: 1) Points; 2) Goal difference; 3) Number of goals scored; 4) Number of wins; 5) Head-to-head record

== Transfers ==
=== Transfers in ===
Date	Position	Nationality	Name	From	Ref.
6 July 2020	GK	(England)	Katie Startup	(England) Charlton Athletic	
13 July 2020	MF	(England)	Katie Robinson	(England) Bristol City	
15 July 2020	MF	(Finland)	Nora Heroum	(Italy) A.C. Milan	
17 July 2020	MF	(Netherlands)	Inessa Kaagman	(England) Everton	
2 September 2020	DF	(New Zealand)	Rebekah Stott	(Australia) Melbourne City	
5 February 2021	DF	(Finland)	Emma Koivisto	(Sweden) Kopparbergs/Göteborg FC	

=== Loans in ===
Date	Position	Nationality	Name	From	Until	Ref.
24 July 2020	FW	(South Korea)	Lee Geum-min	(England) Manchester City	End of season	
9 September 2020	FW	(Republic of Ireland)	Denise O'Sullivan	(United States) North Carolina Courage	31 December 2020	

=== Transfers out ===
Date	Position	Nationality	Name	To	Ref.
3 June 2020	MF	(France)	Léa Le Garrec	(France) FC Fleury 91	
3 June 2020	MF	(England)	Kate Natkiel	(England) Crystal Palace	
3 June 2020	MF	(Sweden)	Amanda Nildén	(Sweden) Eskilstuna United	
3 June 2020	GK	(England)	Sophie Harris	(England) Watford	
3 June 2020	DF	(England)	Fern Whelan	Retired	
3 June 2020	FW	(Nigeria)	Ini Umotong	(Sweden) Växjö DFF	
1 July 2020	DF	(Denmark)	Matilde Lundorf	(Italy) Juventus	

=== Loans out ===
Date	Position	Nationality	Name	To	Until	Ref.
6 August 2020	GK	(England)	Laura Hartley	(England) Lewes	End of season	
7 August 2020	DF	(England)	Ellie Hack	(England) Lewes	End of season	
5 September 2020	DF	(Northern Ireland)	Laura Rafferty	(England) Bristol City	End of season	
6 September 2020	GK	(England)	Katie Startup	(England) Charlton Athletic		
13 September 2020	DF	(England)	Bethan Roe	(England) Charlton Athletic	16 January 2021	
8 January 2021	MF	(England)	Kirsty Barton	(England) Crystal Palace	End of season	

== Squad statistics ==
=== Appearances ===
As of 31 October 2021

Starting appearances are listed first, followed by substitute appearances after the + symbol where applicable.

No.	Pos	Nat	Player	Total		FA WSL		FA Cup		League Cup	
No.	Pos	Nat	Player	Apps	Goals	Apps	Goals	Apps	Goals	Apps	Goals
Goalkeepers
1	GK	(England) ENG	Megan Walsh	17	0	15	0	2	0	0	0
25	GK	(Norway) NOR	Cecilie Fiskerstrand	10	0	7	0	1	0	2	0
40	GK	(England) ENG	Katie Startup	1	0	0	0	1	0	0	0
Defenders
2	DF	(England) ENG	Bethan Roe	5	0	2+1	0	2	0	0	0
3	DF	(England) ENG	Felicity Gibbons	19	2	12+1	0	3+1	2	2	0
4	DF	(England) ENG	Danielle Bowman	15	0	12+1	0	0	0	2	0
5	DF	(Netherlands) NED	Danique Kerkdijk	25	2	16+3	0	4	2	2	0
6	DF	(England) ENG	Maya Le Tissier	27	1	22	1	3	0	2	0
12	DF	(Finland) FIN	Emma Koivisto	13	0	9	0	1+3	0	0	0
13	DF	(New Zealand) NZL	Rebekah Stott	7	0	5+2	0	0	0	0	0
20	DF	(England) ENG	Victoria Williams	20	0	15+2	0	1+1	0	1	0
Midfielders
8	MF	(Republic of Ireland) IRL	Megan Connolly	19	3	14+1	2	3	0	1	1
10	MF	(Netherlands) NED	Inessa Kaagman	27	9	22	8	3	1	0+2	0
11	MF	(Finland) FIN	Nora Heroum	15	1	5+6	0	2	1	2	0
19	MF	(England) ENG	Emily Simpkins	18	0	7+7	0	2+1	0	1	0
21	MF	(England) ENG	Jodie Brett	0	0	0	0	0	0	0	0
22	MF	(England) ENG	Katie Robinson	2	0	1	0	1	0	0	0
24	MF	(England) ENG	Maisie Symonds	3	0	0+2	0	1	0	0	0
26	MF	(England) ENG	Hollie Olding	1	0	0	0	1	0	0	0
32	MF	(England) ENG	Libby Bance	13	0	1+9	0	2	0	0+1	0
Forwards
7	FW	(England) ENG	Aileen Whelan	26	4	22	4	2	0	1+1	0
9	FW	(South Korea) KOR	Lee Geum-min	20	3	12+5	3	0+1	0	2	0
15	FW	(Wales) WAL	Kayleigh Green	21	0	13+3	0	2+1	0	1+1	0
16	FW	(England) ENG	Ellie Brazil	18	0	13+2	0	3	0	0	0
23	FW	(Republic of Ireland) IRL	Rianna Jarrett	20	4	8+8	2	2	1	0+2	1
29	FW	(England) ENG	Faith Nokuthula	0	0	0	0	0	0	0	0
Joined during 2021–22 season but competed in the postponed 2020–21 FA Cup:
11	FW	(England) ENG	Rinsola Babajide	1	0	0	0	1	0	0	0
18	FW	(England) ENG	Daniele Carter	1	0	0	0	1	0	0	0
32	MF	(England) ENG	Juliet Adebowale	1	0	0	0	0+1	0	0	0
	DF	(Belgium) BEL	Lea Cordier	1	0	0	0	0+1	0	0	0
Players away from the club on loan:
18	MF	(England) ENG	Kirsty Barton	5	0	1+2	0	0	0	2	0
Players who appeared for the club but left during the season:
12	FW	(Republic of Ireland) IRL	Denise O'Sullivan	11	0	8+1	0	0	0	1+1	0
