= Hartlepool United F.C. Women =

Hartlepool United Women F.C.
- Full name: Hartlepool United Women Football Club
- Nickname: Pools
- Founded: 2015
- Ground: Metcalfe Park, Wolviston
- Manager: Ben Garrity
- League: North East Regional Women's Football League Northern Division
- 2025–26: 10th in NERWFL Northern Division
- Website: https://www.hartlepoolunited.co.uk/teams/women/
Home colours	Away colours

Hartlepool United Women Football Club are an English women's football club affiliated with Hartlepool United F.C. and based in Wolviston, County Durham. They are currently members of the North East Regional Women's Football League Northern Division, the sixth tier of the English women's football league system.

The club were formed in September 2015 and won the North East Regional Women's Football League Northern division in their first year. They achieved back-to-back promotions, defeating Sheffield Wednesday in a play-off final. For the following seasons, Pools would fare well at the top of the fifth tier but were relegated in 2022. Hartlepool would bounce back immediately to the fifth tier after a successful promotion application, before being relegated the following season.

== History ==
In 2015, a Hartlepool United Ladies team was launched. In their first season, they were crowned Durham FA Women's League 1 Champions and won promotion to the North East Regional Women's Football League Northern division, the sixth tier of women's football in England. They also won the Durham FA League Cup, defeating Bishop Auckland 3–1 in the final.

Hartlepool enjoyed an equally successful second season as the side reached the first round proper of the Women's FA Cup for the first time, narrowly losing to local rivals Middlesbrough 1–0. They also made it back-to-back promotions, defeating Sheffield Wednesday 3–1 in the league's play-off promotion final. Pools adapted to life in the fifth tier well and finished third in the 2017–18 season and runners-up in the 2018–19 season.

The team was twice denied the opportunity to gain promotion to the FA Women's National League in the 2019–20 and 2020–21 seasons. In the 2019–20 season, Hartlepool were in third position when the season was cancelled in March due to the COVID-19 pandemic and had the highest points-per-game record, having played fewer games than the teams above them. However, a decision was made by the FA to have no promotion and relegation for tiers three to seven of women's football.

In the 2020–21 season, despite leading the division before the season was cancelled and having the highest points-per-game in the division, Hartlepool decided not to apply for promotion and third placed team Alnwick Town made a successful application to take the promotion spot.

In the following season, Hartlepool were relegated from the Premier division having finished in tenth place. While the team enjoyed good form in the FA Cup, reaching the first round for a second time where they were defeated by Leeds United, the side won only four of their twenty league games. After finishing third in the 2022–23 season, Pools were granted promotion following a successful application. Towards the end of the 2023–24 season, Matt Gatiss was named as the club's new manager. Twelve days after Gatiss' appointment, the club were relegated on the final day of the season. At the end of the 2023–24 season, it was announced that Hartlepool would no longer play home games at the Grayfields and would instead move to Metcalfe Park.

In June 2026, Hartlepool were initially relegated from the NERWFL Northern Division, having finished tenth in the 2025–26 season. This decision was later overturned with the club taking the place of Berwick Rangers.

== Recent seasons ==
Statistics from the previous decade.

Year	League	Level	Pld	W	D	L	GF	GA	GD	Pts	Position	FA Cup
2016–17	NERWFL Northern	6	16	12	1	3	62	16	46	37	2nd of 9	R1
2017–18	NERWFL Premier	5	16	11	1	4	73	27	46	34	3rd of 9	QR3 (Note: Hartlepool United won the game 3–1 before being disqualified for fielding an ineligible player.)
2018–19	NERWFL Premier	5	18	14	1	3	82	34	48	43	2nd of 10	QR2
2019–20	NERWFL Premier	5	7	6	0	1	30	11	19	18	3rd of 9 (Note: The 2019–20 football season was disrupted by the effects of the COVID-19 pandemic. The league season had no promoted clubs.)	QR3
2020–21	NERWFL Premier	5	6	4	2	0	27	14	13	14	1st of 10 (Note: The 2020–21 football season was disrupted by the effects of the COVID-19 pandemic. Hartlepool opted not to apply for promotion with the allocated promotion spot instead going to Alnwick Town.)	Extra preliminary
2021–22	NERWFL Premier	5	20	4	2	14	32	63	−31	14	10th of 11	R1
2022–23	NERWFL Northern	6	22	13	3	6	73	32	41	42	3rd of 12 (Note: Hartlepool were granted promotion following a successful application.)	QR1
2023–24	NERWFL Premier	5	22	3	2	17	26	85	−59	11	11th of 12	QR3
2024–25	NERWFL Northern	6	22	6	5	11	37	58	−21	23	9th of 12	QR1
2025–26	NERWFL Northern	6	20	4	1	15	29	63	−34	13	10th of 11 (Note: Hartlepool were initially relegated before being granted a reprieve.)	QR2

== Players ==
As of 14 September 2025

=== Current squad ===
Note: Flags indicate national team as defined under FIFA eligibility rules; some limited exceptions apply. Players may hold more than one non-FIFA nationality.

No.	Pos.	Nation	Player
2	DF	ENG	Jess Wilson
3	DF	ENG	Emily Booth
4	DF	ENG	Maddy Hillyer
5	DF	ENG	Charlie Geary
6	MF	ENG	Evie Smith
7	MF	ENG	Poppy Todd
8	MF	ENG	Anya Geary
9	MF	ENG	Grace Raw
10	FW	WAL	Linsey Mochan
11	MF	ENG	Morgan Johnson

No.	Pos.	Nation	Player
12	DF	ENG	Chelsea Basnett
14	MF	ENG	Maddy Gray
15	DF	ENG	Emily Stuart
17	DF	ENG	Aimee May
18	MF	ENG	Olivia Bell
19	MF	ENG	Abi Cope
21	MF	ENG	Millie Simon
23	DF	ENG	Katie Robinson
31	GK	ENG	Shannon Schofield

== Managers ==
As of 20 April 2026.

Name	Nationality	From	To	Honours	Notes
Andy Stuart	England	13 September 2015	20 May 2018	Durham FA Women's League One: 2015–16; Durham FA League Cup: 2015–16; NERWFL Northern League play-off winners: 2017	
Craig Devon	England	24 May 2018	15 February 2019	-	
Jonathan Gibbon-Hayes	England	15 February 2019	17 March 2021	-	
Chris Murphy	England	27 April 2021	1 July 2022	-	
Craig Bage	England	24 July 2022	10 December 2023	NERWFL Northern League Promoted: 2022–23	
Andy Stuart (caretaker)	England	14 January 2024	16 May 2024	-	
Matt Gatiss	England	16 May 2024	25 July 2024	-	
Alex Curl	England	25 July 2024	20 December 2024	-	
Gareth Horwood	England	15 January 2025	2 November 2025	-	
Ben Garrity	England	9 November 2025	Present	-	

== Records and statistics ==
=== Club records ===
As of the end of the 2025–26 season

- Best FA Cup performance: First round, 2016–17, 2021–22
- Highest winning margin: 12–0
  - vs. Prudhoe, 30 October 2016
  - vs. Castleford White Rose, 18 February 2018
- Highest league finish: 2nd in NERWFL Premier, 2018–19
- List of seasons spent at level 5 of the women's football league system: 6
- List of seasons spent at level 6 of the women's football league system: 4
- List of seasons spent at level 7 of the women's football league system: 1

=== Most appearances ===
As of the end of the 2025–26 season

Rank	Player	Apps	Goals	Career
1	Emily Stuart	187	13	2016–
2	Jade Pye	134	41	2015–24
3	Justine Robinson	118	81	2015–23
4	Sarah Bartlett	87	5	2015–21
5	Caitlin Bates	83	77	2015–20, 2020–21, 2024, 2026–

=== Most goals ===
As of the end of the 2025–26 season

Rank	Player	Apps	Goals	Career
1	Justine Robinson	118	81	2015–23
2	Caitlin Bates	83	77	2015–20, 2020–21, 2024, 2026–
3	Robyn Foster	65	51	2019–24
4	Jess Dawson	62	42	2016–19, 2021–22
5	Jade Pye	134	41	2015–24

== Honours ==
League

- North East Regional Women's Northern League (level 6)
  - Promoted: 2022–23
  - Play-off winners: 2017
- Durham FA Women's League One (level 7)
  - Champions: 2015–16

Cup

- Durham FA League Cup
  - Winners: 2015–16

== See also ==
- Hartlepool United
- North East Regional Women's Football League
