= 2016–17 Women's FA Cup =

Tournament details
- Country: England; Wales
- Teams: 254

Final positions
- Champions: Manchester City (1st title)
- Runners-up: Birmingham City

Tournament statistics
- Matches played: 242
- Goals scored: 1,191 (4.92 per match)

The 2016–17 Women's FA Cup (also known as the SSE Women's FA Cup for sponsorship reasons) was the 47th staging of the FA Women's Cup, a knockout cup competition for women's football teams in England. Arsenal were the defending champions, having beaten Chelsea 1–0 in the previous final. Manchester City won the cup by beating Birmingham City 4–1 in the final.

== Teams ==
A total of 254 teams had their entries to the tournament accepted by The Football Association. One hundred and sixty-two teams entered at the first or second round qualifying. Teams that play in the FA Women's Premier League Division One were given exemption to the third round qualifying, while teams in the Northern and Southern Division entered at the first round proper. Teams in the FA WSL 2 were exempted to the third round proper, with teams in the FA WSL 1 entering at the fifth round proper.

| Round | Clubs remaining | Clubs involved | Winners from previous round | Games played | Goals scored | Prize money |
|---|---|---|---|---|---|---|
| First round qualifying | 254 | 4 | – | 2 | 3 | £350 |
| Second round qualifying | 252 | 160 | 2 | 72 | 389 | £450 |
| Third round qualifying | 172 | 128 | 80 | 64 | 357 | £500 |
| Fourth round qualifying | 108 | 64 | 64 | 32 | 175 | £600 |
| First round | 76 | 56 | 32 | 26 | 96 | £800 |
| Second round | 48 | 28 | 28 | 14 | 54 | £900 |
| Third round | 34 | 24 | 14 | 11 | 45 | £1,000 |
| Fourth round | 22 | 12 | 12 | 6 | 14 | £2,000 |
| Fifth round | 16 | 16 | 6 | 8 | 38 | £3,000 |
| Sixth round | 8 | 8 | 8 | 4 | 12 | £4,000 |
| Semi-Final | 4 | 4 | 4 | 2 | 3 | £5,000 |
| The Final | 2 | 2 | 2 | 1 | 5 | £15,000 (runners-up) £25,000 (winners) |

The second round qualifying saw eight ties cancelled due to the withdrawal of one of the teams, the first round proper saw two ties cancelled due to the resignation of Nuneaton Town and Forest Green Rovers before the season started, and the third round proper saw one tie cancelled due to the withdrawal of Watford.

== First round qualifying ==
There were only two first round qualifying matches, both of which were played on 4 September 2016.

| Tie | Home team (tier) | Score | Away team (tier) | Att. |
|---|---|---|---|---|
| 1 | South Shields (6) | 2–0 | Gateshead Leam Rangers (7) | 25 |
| 2 | Wigan Athletic (5) | 1–0 | MSB Woolton (5) | |

== Second round qualifying ==
Eighty matches were scheduled for the second qualifying round. The 160 teams taking part consisted of 158 teams exempted to this stage, plus the two match winners from the previous round. Most matches were played on Sunday 18 September 2016, the only exception being Bishop's Stortford v Bungay Town, which took place on the preceding Saturday.

| Tie | Home team (tier) | Score | Away team (tier) | Att. |
|---|---|---|---|---|
| 1 | Wallsend Boys Club (5) | 5–2 | Boldon CA Villa (7) | 42 |
| 2 | South Shields (6) | 1–1 (4–2 p) | Cramlington United (6) | 30 |
| 3 | South Park Rangers (7) | H–W | Kendal Town (6) | |
| 4 | Penrith (6) | 1–0 (a.e.t.) | Bishop Auckland (7) | |
| 5 | RACA Tynedale (5) | H–W | Rutherford (7) | |
| 6 | Workington Reds (6) | 2–1 | Birtley Town (7) | |
| 7 | Norton & Stockton Ancients (5) | 7–0 | Carlisle United (6) | 150 |
| 8 | Prudhoe Town (6) | 0–9 | Hartlepool United (6) | 50 |
| 9 | Boldon CA (5) | 3–1 | Blyth Town Lions (6) | |
| 10 | Ossett Albion (6) | 1–0 | Malet Lambert (6) | 39 |
| 11 | Wakefield (5) | 0–7 | Farsley Celtic (6) | |
| 12 | Bradford Park Avenue (7) | 1–8 | Sheffield United (5) | |
| 13 | Sheffield Wednesday (6) | 4–0 | Brighouse Athletic (7) | |
| 14 | Accrington (5) | 11–2 | Curzon Ashton (6) | 85 |
| 15 | FC United of Manchester (6) | 2–1 | Bolton Wanderers (5) | |
| 16 | CMB (5) | 0–4 | Stockport County (5) | |
| 17 | Burnley (7) | 0–7 | Wigan Athletic (5) | |
| 18 | Merseyrail Bootle (6) | 4–1 | City of Manchester (5) | |
| 19 | Chorltonians (6) | 0–2 | Warrington Wolverines (6) | |
| 20 | Rise Park (5) | 0–0 (3–4 p) | Arnold Town (5) | |
| 21 | Leicester City Women Development (6) | 3–0 | Winterton Rangers (6) | |
| 22 | Dronfield Town (7) | 4–4 (2–3 p) | Lincoln Moorlands Railway (6) | 15 |
| 23 | Nettleham (5) | 16–0 | Teversal (6) | |
| 24 | Market Warsop (7) | 5–1 | AFC Leicester (6) | |
| 25 | Stourbridge (6) | 2–1 | Stockingford AA Pavilion (6) | 68 |
| 26 | Coundon Court (5) | 9–0 | Bilbrook (6) | |
| 27 | Leamington Lions (5) | 2–2 (5–4 p) | Wolverhampton Sporting Community (5) | 58 |
| 28 | Bedworth United (5) | 7–0 | Stone Dominoes (6) | |
| 29 | Coleshill Town (6) | 0–3 | Coventry Ladies Development (6) | 59 |
| 30 | Shrewsbury Town (6) | 2–4 | Wyrley (6) | |
| 31 | Bradwell Belles (7) | 1–5 | Shrewsbury Juniors (6) | 70 |
| 32 | Knowle (5) | 1–2 | Leek Town (6) | |
| 33 | Crusaders (5) | 2–2 (3–4 p) | Gornal (7) | 30 |
| 34 | Burton Albion (5) | 3–1 | Lye Town (5) | |
| 35 | Rubery (6) | 2–3 (a.e.t.) | Boldmere St Michaels (7) | |
| 36 | Moulton (7) | 2–5 | Histon (5) | |
| 37 | Riverside (6) | 9–0 | Woodford United (7) | 35 |
| 38 | Oadby & Wigston (6) | 2–0 | Roade (7) | 100 |
| 39 | Peterborough United (6) | 0–1 | Cambridge City (6) | |
| 40 | Acle United (5) | 2–0 | Netherton United (7) | 75 |

| Tie | Home team (tier) | Score | Away team (tier) | Att. |
|---|---|---|---|---|
| 41 | ICA Sports (7) | A–W | Peterborough Northern Star (5) | |
| 42 | Newmarket Town (7) | 2–7 | Wymondham Town (6) | |
| 43 | Park (7) | 0–14 | Northampton Town (6) | |
| 44 | Kettering Town (5) | 4–0 | Thrapston Town (7) | 50 |
| 45 | Colchester Town (5) | 0–3 | AFC Sudbury (5) | |
| 46 | Brandon Town (7) | H–W | Great Wakering Rovers (5) | |
| 47 | Little Thurrock Dynamos (6) | 1–2 (a.e.t.) | Brentwood Town (5) | |
| 48 | Harlow Town (7) | 2–3 | Billericay Town (5) | |
| 49 | Writtle (5) | 0–3 | Leyton Orient (5) | |
| 50 | Haringey Borough (5) | 12–0 | Chelmsford City (7) | |
| 51 | Bishop's Stortford (7) | 1–3 | Bungay Town (7) | |
| 52 | Hertford Town (6) | H–W | Garston (7) | |
| 53 | Houghton Athletic (7) | 2–1 | Sherrardswood (7) | |
| 54 | AFC Dunstable (5) | 8–0 | Sandy (7) | |
| 55 | Colney Heath (6) | 1–3 | Royston Town (5) | |
| 56 | Hemel Hempstead Town (6) | 2–1 | Bedford (5) | 60 |
| 57 | Queens Park Rangers Development (6) | 5–0 | Wargrave (6) | |
| 58 | Marlow (5) | 2–4 (a.e.t.) | Oxford City (5) | |
| 59 | Ascot United (6) | 3–2 | Milton Keynes City (5) | 60 |
| 60 | Newbury (5) | 6–2 | Chinnor (7) | |
| 61 | Brentford (7) | 0–8 | Chesham United (5) | |
| 62 | Carshalton Athletic (5) | 1–3 | Aylesford (5) | 53 |
| 63 | Meridian (6) | 2–0 | Eastbourne (6) | |
| 64 | Haywards Heath & Wivelsfield (7) | 1–5 | Cowfold (7) | |
| 65 | Burgess Hill Town (7) | 0–4 | Regents Park Rangers (6) | |
| 66 | Long Lane (6) | 2–3 | Fulham (5) | |
| 67 | Margate (7) | 1–10 | Bexhill United (6) | |
| 68 | Herne Bay (5) | 1–1 (3–1 p) | Parkwood Rangers (6) | 82 |
| 69 | London Corinthians (5) | 6–0 | Victoire (7) | |
| 70 | Abbey Rangers (6) | 1–7 | Crawley Wasps (5) | |
| 71 | Worthing Town (7) | H–W | Rottingdean Village (6) | |
| 72 | Warsash Wasps (7) | 1–2 | Poole Town (5) | |
| 73 | Fleet Town (6) | 6–0 | Team Solent (5) | |
| 74 | New Milton Town (6) | 1–0 | AFC Bournemouth (7) | |
| 75 | Bournemouth Sports (7) | 0–12 | Southampton (5) | |
| 76 | Middlezoy Rovers (5) | 2–2 (0–2 p) | Ilminster Town (6) | |
| 77 | AEK Boco (6) | 3–1 (a.e.t.) | Royal Wootton Bassett Town (7) | |
| 78 | Buckland Athletic (6) | H–W | Cheltenham Civil Service (6) | |
| 79 | Downend Flyers (5) | 7–1 | Pen Mill (7) | |
| 80 | Keynsham Town Development (5) | A–W | Torquay United (5) | |

== Third round qualifying ==
Sixty four matches were scheduled for the third qualifying round. The 128 teams taking part consisted of 48 teams from the FA Women's Premier League Division One, plus the 80 match winners from the previous round. All 64 matches were played on Sunday 9 October 2016.

| Tie | Home team (tier) | Score | Away team (tier) | Att. |
|---|---|---|---|---|
| 1 | Wallsend Boys Club (5) | 3–2 | Wigan Athletic (5) | 68 |
| 2 | Norton & Stockton Ancients (5) | 2–1 | FC United of Manchester (6) | 300 |
| 3 | Leeds (4) | 6–1 | South Park Rangers (7) | 104 |
| 4 | Farsley Celtic (6) | 2–4 | Merseyrail Bootle (6) | |
| 5 | Penrith (6) | 4–2 | Boldon CA (5) | |
| 6 | Lincoln Moorlands Railway (6) | 1–6 | Warrington Wolverines (6) | |
| 7 | Crewe Alexandra (4) | 3–3 (4–2 p) | Morecambe (4) | |
| 8 | Steel City Wanderers (4) | 1–4 | Sheffield Wednesday (6) | |
| 9 | Mossley Hill (4) | 0–4 | Liverpool Marshall Feds (4) | 60 |
| 10 | Guiseley AFC Vixens (4) | 7–2 | Rotherham United (4) | |
| 11 | Chester-le-Street Town (4) | 0–1 | Sheffield United (5) | 30 |
| 12 | Hartlepool United (6) | 7–1 | Ossett Albion (6) | |
| 13 | Accrington (5) | 3–0 | Tranmere Rovers (4) | 53 |
| 14 | Stockport County (5) | 1–2 | Brighouse Town (4) | 40 |
| 15 | Blackpool Wren Rovers (4) | 2–2 (5–3 p) | Chorley (4) | |
| 16 | Hull City (4) | 4–2 (a.e.t.) | South Shields (6) | |
| 17 | Workington Reds (6) | 1–5 | RACA Tynedale (5) | |
| 18 | Wyrley (6) | 1–6 | Radcliffe Olympic (4) | |
| 19 | Leamington Lions (5) | 0–4 | Burton Albion (5) | |
| 20 | Sporting Khalsa (4) | 7–0 | Coundon Court (5) | |
| 21 | Arnold Town (5) | 3–3 (3–4 p) | Coventry Ladies Development (6) | 41 |
| 22 | Bedworth United (5) | 2–6 | Leicester City Women Development (6) | 60 |
| 23 | Leicester City Ladies (4) | 2–3 | Birmingham & West Midlands (4) | |
| 24 | Loughborough Foxes (4) | 2–3 | Wolverhampton Wanderers (4) | |
| 25 | Shrewsbury Juniors (6) | 2–6 (a.e.t.) | The New Saints (4) | 50 |
| 26 | Boldmere St Michaels (7) | 2–8 | Long Eaton United (4) | |
| 27 | Stourbridge (6) | 1–2 | Gornal (7) | 109 |
| 28 | Oadby & Wigston (6) | 0–6 | Solihull Ladies (4) | |
| 29 | Market Warsop (7) | 3–4 | Nettleham (5) | |
| 30 | Loughborough Students (4) | 1–3 | Leek Town (6) | |
| 31 | Norwich City (4) | 10–0 | Riverside (6) | |
| 32 | Lowestoft Town (4) | 2–0 | Enfield Town (4) | |

| Tie | Home team (tier) | Score | Away team (tier) | Att. |
|---|---|---|---|---|
| 33 | Milton Keynes Dons (4) | 4–0 | Actonians (4) | |
| 34 | Histon (5) | 0–5 | Peterborough Northern Star (5) | |
| 35 | Northampton Town (6) | 2–3 | Cambridge City (6) | |
| 36 | Denham United (4) | 4–1 | Ipswich Town (4) | 200 |
| 37 | Cambridge United (4) | 3–0 | Wymondham Town (6) | |
| 38 | AFC Sudbury (5) | 2–3 | Luton Town (4) | |
| 39 | Kettering Town (5) | 6–0 | Brandon Town (7) | 40 |
| 40 | Bungay Town (7) | 3–6 | Acle United (5) | 110 |
| 41 | Hemel Hempstead Town (6) | 2–0 | Herne Bay (5) | 65 |
| 42 | AFC Dunstable (5) | 4–1 | Meridian (6) | |
| 43 | Houghton Athletic (7) | 0–3 | Brentwood Town (5) | |
| 44 | Haringey Borough (5) | 2–8 | Chichester City (4) | |
| 45 | Crawley Wasps (5) | 0–2 | Oxford City (5) | |
| 46 | Newbury (5) | 2–1 | Hertford Town (6) | |
| 47 | Leyton Orient (5) | 16–0 | Ascot United (6) | |
| 48 | Billericay Town (5) | 1–2 | Basingstoke Town (4) | |
| 49 | Fulham (5) | 0–2 | Queens Park Rangers Development (6) | |
| 50 | Worthing Town (7) | 0–15 | Stevenage (4) | 51 |
| 51 | Cowfold (7) | 1–2 | Aylesford (5) | 40 |
| 52 | Chesham United (5) | 2–1 | London Corinthians (5) | |
| 53 | Bexhill United (6) | 0–6 | AFC Wimbledon (4) | |
| 54 | Royston Town (5) | 2–3 | Regents Park Rangers (6) | 35 |
| 55 | Gillingham (4) | 4–0 | Maidenhead United (4) | |
| 56 | Southampton (5) | 5–1 | Fleet Town (6) | |
| 57 | Shanklin (4) | 3–2 | St Nicholas (4) | |
| 58 | Buckland Athletic (6) | 2–3 | Keynsham Town (4) | |
| 59 | Torquay United (5) | 2–4 | Brislington (4) | |
| 60 | Poole Town (5) | 3–0 | AEK Boco (6) | |
| 61 | Ilminster Town (6) | 0–4 | Plymouth Argyle (4) | |
| 62 | Southampton Saints (4) | 8–2 | Downend Flyers (5) | |
| 63 | Larkhall Athletic (4) | 9–1 | Cheltenham Town (4) | 25 |
| 64 | New Milton Town (6) | 1–2 | Exeter City (4) | |

== Fourth round qualifying ==
Thirty two matches were scheduled for the fourth qualifying round. Most matches were played on Sunday 13 November 2016, except three which were postponed to the following Sunday due to waterlogged pitches.

| Tie | Home team (tier) | Score | Away team (tier) | Att. |
|---|---|---|---|---|
| 1 | Sheffield United (5) | 3–1 | Merseyrail Bootle (6) | |
| 2 | Penrith (6) | 0–4 | Norton & Stockton Ancients (5) | |
| 3 | Guiseley AFC Vixens (4) | 7–1 | Nettleham (5) | |
| 4 | Liverpool Marshall Feds (4) | 7–1 | Warrington Wolverines (6) | |
| 5 | RACA Tynedale (5) | 2–1 | Crewe Alexandra (4) | |
| 6 | Brighouse Town (4) | 5–0 | Blackpool Wren Rovers (4) | |
| 7 | Hartlepool United (6) | 7–1 | Accrington (5) | |
| 8 | Hull City (4) | 6–0 | Leeds (4) | |
| 9 | Wallsend Boys Club (5) | 1–2 | Sheffield Wednesday (6) | |
| 10 | Sporting Khalsa (4) | 2–4 (a.e.t.) | Wolverhampton Wanderers (4) | |
| 11 | Solihull (4) | 3–0 | Burton Albion (5) | |
| 12 | Radcliffe Olympic (4) | 8–0 | Gornal (7) | 54 |
| 13 | Leek Town (6) | 1–2 (a.e.t.) | Leicester City Women Development (6) | |
| 14 | The New Saints | 2–5 | Birmingham & West Midlands (4) | |
| 15 | Long Eaton United (4) | 7–1 | Coventry Ladies Development (6) | |
| 16 | Acle United (5) | 3–0 | Brentwood Town (5) | 68 |

| Tie | Home team (tier) | Score | Away team (tier) | Att. |
|---|---|---|---|---|
| 17 | Norwich City (4) | 3–3 (4–3 p) | Lowestoft Town (4) | |
| 18 | Cambridge United (4) | 3–0 | Stevenage (4) | |
| 19 | Kettering Town (5) | 0–3 | Peterborough Northern Star (5) | 50 |
| 20 | Leyton Orient (5) | 3–1 | Cambridge City (6) | |
| 21 | Luton Town (4) | 6–1 | Oxford City (5) | 61 |
| 22 | Chesham United (5) | 2–4 | Regents Park Rangers (6) | |
| 23 | Hemel Hempstead Town (6) | 2–0 | AFC Dunstable (5) | 100 |
| 24 | AFC Wimbledon (4) | 4–2 | Denham United (4) | |
| 25 | Aylesford (5) | 0–7 | Gillingham (4) | |
| 26 | Queens Park Rangers Development (6) | 1–6 | Milton Keynes Dons (4) | |
| 27 | Brislington (4) | 8–0 | Poole Town (5) | |
| 28 | Southampton Saints (4) | 10–0 | Exeter City (4) | |
| 29 | Larkhall Athletic (4) | 8–1 | Newbury (5) | |
| 30 | Plymouth Argyle (4) | 3–1 | Basingstoke Town (4) | 43 |
| 31 | Shanklin (4) | 0–3 | Southampton (5) | |
| 32 | Chichester City (4) | 1–2 | Keynsham Town (4) | |

== First round proper ==
Twenty eight matches were scheduled for the first round proper. The 56 teams taking part consists of 24 FA Women's National League teams exempted to this stage, plus the 32 match winners from the previous round. Most matches were played on Sunday 4 December 2016, the only exception being Southampton Women v Swindon Town, which was postponed to the following Sunday.

Number of teams per tier still in competition
| WSL 1 | WSL 2 | Premier Division | Division One | Regional & County | Total |
|---|---|---|---|---|---|
| 10 / 10 | 10 / 10 | 24 / 24 | 20 / 20 | 12 / 12 | 76 / 76 |

| 4 December 2016 | Acle United (5) | 0–2 | C&K Basildon (3) |
| | | Report | Rushen; Wakefield | Attendance: 108 |

| 4 December 2016 | Birmingham & West Midlands (4) | 0–3 | Leicester City (3) |
| | | Report | McIntosh 32'; Domingo 45'; Farrow 52' | Attendance: 28 |

| 4 December 2016 | Bradford City (3) | 0–1 | Blackburn Rovers (3) | Wrose |
| | | Report | McCoy 88' | Stadium: Kingsway |

| 4 December 2016 | Brighouse Town (4) | 3–2 | Peterborough Northern Star (5) |
| | Bamforth; Redgrave | Report | Goal | Attendance: 54 |

| 4 December 2016 | Cambridge United (4) | 3–1 | Queens Park Rangers (3) |
| | Mills; Taylor | Report | Treharne 40' |

| 4 December 2016 | Cardiff City (3) | 6–0 | Larkhall Athletic (4) |
| | Evans; C. Williams; Lloyd; Chivers | Report | | Attendance: 105 |

| 4 December 2016 | Crystal Palace (3) | 1–2 | Charlton Athletic (3) |
| | Donohoe 41' | Report | Sullivan 78'; Clifford 89' | Attendance: 562 |

| 4 December 2016 | Guiseley AFC Vixens (4) | 0–1 | Nottingham Forest (3) |
| | | Report | Broad 51' | Attendance: 53 |

| 4 December 2016 | Huddersfield Town (3) | 0–1 | Derby County (3) |
| | | Report | Reay 32' | Attendance: 76; Referee: Stephen Rushworth |

| 4 December 2016 | Lewes (3) | 5–0 | Brislington (4) |
| | Bridges 30'; Lane 53', 67'; Stenning 78'; Bridge 88' | Report | | Attendance: 60 |

| 4 December 2016 | Long Eaton United (4) | W–O | Nuneaton Town (3) |
| | | Report |

| 4 December 2016 | Luton Town (4) | 1–4 | Portsmouth (3) | Luton |
| | Henman 81' | Report | Stephens 8'; Kempson 31', 59'; Bell 76' | Stadium: Stockwood Park Athletics Stadium; Attendance: 44 |

| 4 December 2016 | Middlesbrough (3) | 1–0 | Hartlepool United (6) |
| | Bell 46' | Report | | Attendance: 237 |

| 4 December 2016 | Milton Keynes Dons (4) | 3–1 | Hemel Hempstead Town (6) |
| | Barrett; McDonnell | Report | Goal | Attendance: 95 |

| 4 December 2016 | Norton & Stockton Ancients (5) | 1–6 | Hull City (4) |
| | Goal | Report | Robinson; Stamp; Thompson; Russell | Attendance: 200 |

| 4 December 2016 | Norwich City (4) | 1–4 | AFC Wimbledon (4) |
| | Garrett 22' | Report | Heasman 39'; Quinn-Low 47'; Keady 70'; Trimnell (90+!) | Attendance: 27 |

| 4 December 2016 | Plymouth Argyle (4) | W–O | Forest Green Rovers (3) |
| | | Report |

| 4 December 2016 | RACA Tynedale (5) | 0–3 | Newcastle United (3) |
| | | Report | Clark 48'; Dack 75'; S. Williams 81' |

| 4 December 2016 | Radcliffe Olympic (4) | 6–0 | Sheffield Wednesday (6) | Radcliffe-on-Trent |
| | Ramadan 5'; Evans 40'; Donovan 42', 43'; Kempski 83'; Bailey 85' | Report | | Stadium: Wharf Lane; Attendance: 60 |

| 4 December 2016 | Regents Park Rangers (6) | 1–6 | Keynsham Town (4) |
| | Goal | Report | Goal |

| 4 December 2016 | Sheffield United (5) | 2–0 | Leicester City Women Development (6) | Sheffield |
| | Goal | Report | | Stadium: Bramall Lane; Attendance: 429; Referee: Liam Marsh |

| 4 December 2016 | Gillingham (4) | 7–1 | Southampton Saints (4) | Chatham |
| | Blackie; Gurr; Gibbons | Report | Goal | Stadium: The Bauvill Stadium |

| 4 December 2016 | Stoke City (3) | 1–1 (a.e.t.) (4–2 p) | Liverpool Marshall Feds (4) | Smallthorne |
| | Goal | Report | Lee 54' | Stadium: Norton Cricket Club & Miners Welfare Institute |
| | Penalties |
| | Penalty scored | | Penalty scored Penalty missed |

| 4 December 2016 | Tottenham Hotspur (3) | 1–0 | Leyton Orient (5) | Cheshunt |
| | Martin 76' | Report | | Stadium: Theobalds Lane; Attendance: 51; Referee: Fabien Le Houezec |

| 4 December 2016 | West Bromwich Albion (3) | 4–1 | Fylde (3) | Rushall |
| | Dugmore 3'; Cottam 8', 86'; Greaves 68' | Report | Young | Stadium: Dales Lane; Attendance: 50 |

| 4 December 2016 | West Ham United (3) | 0–3 | Coventry United (3) | Purfleet |
| | | Report | Hall 10'; Gauntlett 28'; Brook 34' | Stadium: Ship Lane; Attendance: 47 |

| 4 December 2016 | Wolverhampton Wanderers (4) | 4–0 | Solihull (4) | Hednesford |
| | Anslow 24'; Cross 26', 65'; Brackenbury 46' | Report | | Stadium: Keys Park; Attendance: 40 |

| 11 December 2016 | Southampton Women (5) | 2–0 | Swindon Town (3) |
| | Bell 32'; Gillbank 49' | Report |

== Second round proper ==
Fourteen matches were scheduled for the second round proper. All 14 matches were played on Sunday 8 January 2017.

Number of teams per tier still in competition
| WSL 1 | WSL 2 | Premier Division | Division One | Regional & County | Total |
|---|---|---|---|---|---|
| 10 / 10 | 10 / 10 | 14 / 24 | 12 / 20 | 2 / 12 | 48 / 76 |

| 8 January 2017 | Blackburn Rovers (3) | 5–0 | Hull City (4) | Bamber Bridge |
| | Holbrook 45+1'; Toone 48', 75'; Fenton 63'; McCoy 86' | Report | | Stadium: Irongate |

| 8 January 2017 | C&K Basildon (3) | 1–3 | Keynsham Town (4) | Canvey Island |
| | Sinclair | Report | Goal | Stadium: Park Lane |

| 8 January 2017 | Cambridge United (4) | 4–0 | Southampton Women (5) | Mildenhall |
| | Emmings; Kmita; Puddefoot; Taylor | Report | | Stadium: Recreation Way; Attendance: 110 |

| 8 January 2017 | Charlton Athletic (3) | 5–0 | Portsmouth (3) | Charlton |
| | Dixson 36'; Graham 45', 57', 65'; Bottom 49' | Report | | Stadium: The Valley |

| 8 January 2017 | Coventry United (3) | 4–0 | Milton Keynes Dons (4) | Coleshill |
| | Goal | Report | | Stadium: Pack Meadow; Attendance: 81 |

| 8 January 2017 | Derby County (3) | 3–2 (a.e.t.) | Sheffield United (5) | Mickleover |
| | Wilson 52'; May 62'; Newton 98' | Report | Goal | Stadium: Station Road; Attendance: 240 |

| 8 January 2017 | Lewes (3) | 2–0 | Cardiff City (3) | Lewes |
| | Carter 18'; Rutherford 36' | Report | | Stadium: The Dripping Pan; Attendance: 110 |

| 8 January 2017 | Liverpool Marshall Feds (4) | 1–0 | Newcastle United (3) | Aigburth |
| | Longhurst 61' | Report | | Stadium: I.M. Marsh Campus; Attendance: 70 |

| 8 January 2017 | Long Eaton United (4) | 3–4 | Brighouse Town (4) | Long Eaton |
| | Hamilton 38', 58'; Newton 45' | Report | Redgrave | Stadium: Grange Park |

| 8 January 2017 | Middlesbrough (3) | 1–2 (a.e.t.) | Leicester City (3) | Thornaby-on-Tees |
| | Ashenhurst 89' | Report | Farrow 39'; Hillier 118' | Stadium: Teesdale Park; Attendance: 175 |

| 8 January 2017 | Nottingham Forest (3) | 4–0 | Wolverhampton Wanderers (4) | Basford |
| | Broad 3'; Bell 11', 62'; Lowder 25' | Report | | Stadium: Greenwich Avenue |

| 8 January 2017 | Plymouth Argyle (4) | 0–3 | AFC Wimbledon (4) | Plymouth |
| | | Report | Bock 36'; Quinn-Low 53', 62' | Stadium: Haye Road; Attendance: 100 |

| 8 January 2017 | Tottenham Hotspur (3) | 3–0 | Gillingham (4) | Cheshunt |
| | Vio 75'; Baptiste 77', 87' | Report | | Stadium: Theobalds Lane; Attendance: 111 |

| 8 January 2017 | West Bromwich Albion (3) | 4–0 | Radcliffe Olympic (4) | Rushall |
| | Parnell 17', 53'; Cottam 38'; Warner 66' | Report | | Stadium: Dales Lane; Attendance: 38 |

== Third round proper ==
Twelve matches were scheduled for the third round proper. The 24 teams taking part consists of 10 FA WSL 2 teams exempted to this stage, plus the 14 match winners from the previous round. All 11 matches that took place were played on Sunday 5 February 2017.

Number of teams per tier still in competition
| WSL 1 | WSL 2 | Premier Division | Division One | Regional & County | Total |
|---|---|---|---|---|---|
| 10 / 10 | 10 / 10 | 9 / 24 | 5 / 20 | 0 / 12 | 34 / 76 |

| 5 February 2017 | AFC Wimbledon (4) | 1–4 | Brighton & Hove Albion (2) | Sutton |
| | Searle 60' | Report | Goal | Stadium: Gander Green Lane; Referee: Mark Edwards |

| 5 February 2017 | Aston Villa (2) | 7–1 | Cambridge United (4) | Tamworth |
| | Goal | Report | Taylor | Stadium: The Lamb Ground |

| 5 February 2017 | Blackburn Rovers (3) | 1–2 | Tottenham Hotspur (3) | Bamber Bridge |
| | Toone 7' | Report | Baptiste 19', 90' | Stadium: Irongate |

| 5 February 2017 | Brighouse Town (4) | 1–8 | Everton (2) | Brighouse |
| | Cass 68' | Report | Magill 12', 33'; Hinnigan 40'; Walker 45', 81', 86'; Chance 75', 89' | Stadium: St Giles Road; Attendance: 411 |

| 5 February 2017 | Charlton Athletic (3) | 0–2 | Sheffield (2) | Thamesmead |
| | | Report | S. Jones 48'; Flint 76' | Stadium: Bayliss Avenue; Attendance: 153 |

| 5 February 2017 | Coventry United (3) | 2–0 | Oxford United (2) | Coleshill |
| | Goal | Report | | Stadium: Pack Meadow; Attendance: 189 |

| 5 February 2017 | Derby County (3) | 0–1 | Nottingham Forest (3) | Mickleover |
| | | Report | Kennaugh 13' | Stadium: Station Road; Attendance: 633 |

| 5 February 2017 | Doncaster Rovers Belles (2) | W–O | Watford (2) |
| | | Report |

| 5 February 2017 | Keynsham Town (4) | 0–7 | Durham (2) | Keynsham |
| | | Report | Ness 19', 61'; McFadden 21', 36'; Gutteridge 51'; Salicki 56'; Roberts 81' | Stadium: Crown Field; Attendance: 138 |

| 5 February 2017 | Leicester City (3) | 2–1 | Liverpool Marshall Feds (4) | Leicester |
| | Goal | Report | Kinvig 79' | Stadium: Riverside |

| 5 February 2017 | Millwall Lionesses (2) | 1–0 | London Bees (2) | Rotherhithe |
| | Goal | Report | | Stadium: St Pauls Sports Ground |

| 5 February 2017 | West Bromwich Albion (3) | 3–1 | Lewes (3) | Rushall |
| | Greaves 27', 63'; Dugmore 75' | Report | Lane 12' | Stadium: Dales Lane; Attendance: 35 |

== Fourth round proper ==
Six matches were scheduled for the fourth round proper. All six matches were played on Sunday 19 February 2017.

Number of teams per tier still in competition
| WSL 1 | WSL 2 | Premier Division | Division One | Regional & County | Total |
|---|---|---|---|---|---|
| 10 / 10 | 7 / 10 | 5 / 24 | 0 / 20 | 0 / 12 | 22 / 76 |

| 19 February 2017 | Coventry United (3) | 0–1 | Aston Villa (2) | Rugby |
| | | Report | Goal | Stadium: Butlin Road; Attendance: 364 |

| 19 February 2017 | Durham (2) | 2–2 (a.e.t.) (3–4 p) | Everton (2) | Belmont |
| | Hepple 34'; Salicki 43' | Report | Hinnigan 51'; Magill 75' | Stadium: New Ferens Park; Attendance: 365; Referee: Matthew Sowerby |
| | Penalties |
| | Ness (penalty scored); Hepple (penalty scored); McFadden (penalty scored); Jennings (penalty missed); Wilson (penalty missed) | | (penalty scored) Walker; (penalty missed) Hinnigan; (penalty scored) K. Jones; (penalty scored) V. Jones; (penalty scored) Magill |

| 19 February 2017 | Millwall Lionesses (2) | 3–1 | Nottingham Forest (3) | Rotherhithe |
| | Goal | Report | Lowder 29' | Stadium: St Pauls Sports Ground |

| 19 February 2017 | Sheffield (2) | 0–1 | Doncaster Rovers Belles (2) | Dronfield |
| | | Report | Sweetman-Kirk 26' | Stadium: Home of Football |

| 19 February 2017 | Tottenham Hotspur (3) | 1–0 | Brighton & Hove Albion (2) | Cheshunt |
| | Baptiste 57' | Report | | Stadium: Theobalds Lane; Attendance: 127; Referee: Alex Rayment |

| 19 February 2017 | West Bromwich Albion (3) | 2–1 | Leicester City (3) | Rushall |
| | Dugmore 11'; Cottam 25' | Report | James 69' | Stadium: Dales Lane; Attendance: 60 |

== Fifth round proper ==
Eight matches were scheduled for the fifth round proper. The 16 teams taking part consists of 10 FA WSL 1 teams exempted to this stage, plus the six match winners from the previous round. Most matches were played on Sunday 19 March 2017, the only exception being Manchester City v Reading, which took place on the preceding Saturday.

Number of teams per tier still in competition
| WSL 1 | WSL 2 | Premier Division | Division One | Regional & County | Total |
|---|---|---|---|---|---|
| 10 / 10 | 4 / 10 | 2 / 24 | 0 / 20 | 0 / 12 | 16 / 76 |

| 19 March 2017 | Arsenal (1) | 10–0 | Tottenham Hotspur (3) | Borehamwood |
| | D. Carter 22', 30'; Janssen 29'; Little 38'; Van de Donk 43', 59', 84'; Kelly 65'; Mead 69'; McCabe 77' | Report | | Stadium: Meadow Park; Attendance: 1,407; Referee: Jason Richardson |

| 19 March 2017 | Birmingham City (1) | 2–0 | West Bromwich Albion (3) | Solihull |
| | J. Carter 43'; White 60' | Report | | Stadium: Damson Park; Attendance: 1,122; Referee: John Roskelly |

| 19 March 2017 | Bristol City (1) | 5–0 | Millwall Lionesses (2) | Filton |
| | Turner 6', 19'; Hemp 17', 69'; Brett 75' | Report | | Stadium: Stoke Gifford Stadium; Attendance: 466 |

| 19 March 2017 | Chelsea (1) | 7–0 | Doncaster Rovers Belles (2) | Staines-upon-Thames |
| | Dunn 12'; Ji 33', 37'; L. Little 41' (o.g.); Bachmann 45'; Chapman 70'; Spence 72' | Report | | Stadium: Wheatsheaf Park; Attendance: 806; Referee: Neil Morrison |

| 19 March 2017 | Liverpool (1) | 2–1 (a.e.t.) | Everton (2) | Widnes |
| | Harding 8'; Van de Sanden 108' | Report | Magill 69' | Stadium: Halton Stadium; Attendance: 728; Referee: K Sarsfield |

| 19 March 2017 | Manchester City (1) | 1–0 | Reading (1) | Manchester |
| | Bronze 82' | Report | | Stadium: Academy Stadium; Attendance: 891; Referee: Aaron Jackson |

| 19 March 2017 | Notts County (1) | 3–2 | Yeovil Town (1) | Eastwood |
| | Moore 26'; Linnett 53'; Buet 86' | Report | Quinn 85'; Snook 88' | Stadium: Coronation Park; Attendance: 443; Referee: Martyn Fryer |

| 19 March 2017 | Sunderland (1) | 3–2 | Aston Villa (2) | Hetton-le-Hole |
| | Williams 13'; Sharp 35'; Staniforth 65' | Report | Baptiste 19'; Sheperd 49' | Stadium: The Hetton Centre; Attendance: 262; Referee: Dean Hulme |

== Quarter-finals ==
Four matches were scheduled for the sixth round proper. All four matches were played on Sunday 26 March 2017.

Number of teams per tier still in competition
| WSL 1 | WSL 2 | Premier Division | Division One | Regional & County | Total |
|---|---|---|---|---|---|
| 8 / 10 | 0 / 10 | 0 / 24 | 0 / 20 | 0 / 12 | 8 / 76 |

| 26 March 2017 | Birmingham City (1) | 1–0 | Arsenal (1) | Solihull |
| | Ewers 77' | Report | | Stadium: Damson Park; Attendance: 514; Referee: Ian Rathbone |

| 26 March 2017 | Bristol City (1) | 1–2 | Manchester City (1) | Filton |
| | Emslie 45' | Report | Ladd 7' (o.g.); Parris 89' | Stadium: Stoke Gifford Stadium; Attendance: 594; Referee: Richard Hulme |

| 26 March 2017 | Chelsea (1) | 5–1 | Sunderland (1) | Staines-upon-Thames |
| | Bachmann 38', 43'; Blundell 48', 57'; Spence 90' | Report | Staniforth 17' | Stadium: Wheatsheaf Park; Attendance: 682; Referee: Elliott Kay |

| 26 March 2017 | Liverpool (1) | 2–0 | Notts County (1) | Widnes |
| | Weir 3'; Harding 18' | Report | | Stadium: Halton Stadium; Attendance: 302; Referee: Simon Mather |

== Semi-finals ==
The two semi-finals were played on Monday 17 April 2017.

Number of teams per tier still in competition
| WSL 1 | WSL 2 | Premier Division | Division One | Regional & County | Total |
|---|---|---|---|---|---|
| 4 / 10 | 0 / 10 | 0 / 24 | 0 / 20 | 0 / 12 | 4 / 76 |

| 17 April 2017 | Birmingham City (1) | 1–1 (a.e.t.) (4–2 p) | Chelsea (1) | Damson Park, Solihull |
| 14:05 BST (UTC+01:00) | Sargeant 64' | Report | Spence 88' | Attendance: 1,425; Referee: Amy Fearn |
| | Penalties |
| | Mannion (penalty scored); Mayling (penalty scored); Harrop (penalty scored); White (penalty scored) | | (penalty scored) Mjelde; (penalty scored) Blundell; (penalty missed) Aluko; (penalty missed) Bright |

| 17 April 2017 | Manchester City (1) | 1–0 | Liverpool (1) | Academy Stadium, Manchester |
| 14:00 BST (UTC+01:00) | Lawley 58' | Report | | Attendance: 3,453 |

== Final ==
13 May 2017
17:15 BST (UTC+01:00)

| Birmingham City | 1–4 | Manchester City |
|---|---|---|
| Wellings 73' | Report | Bronze 18'; Christiansen 25'; Lloyd 32'; Scott 80' |

Wembley Stadium
Attendance: 35,271
Referee: Rebecca Welch (Durham FA)
