= 2020–21 Women's FA Cup =

Tournament details
- Country: England; Wales
- Teams: 376

Final positions
- Champions: Chelsea (3rd title)
- Runners-up: Arsenal

Tournament statistics
- Matches played: 369
- Goals scored: 1,904 (5.16 per match)

The 2020–21 Women's FA Cup was the 51st staging of the Women's FA Cup, a knockout cup competition for women's football teams in England. Manchester City were the defending champions, having beaten Everton 3–1 in the previous final. The draw was split regionally until the fourth round proper.

== Teams ==
A total of 376 teams had their entries to the tournament accepted by The Football Association, an increase of 76 from the previous year. 174 teams from outside the top four divisions will enter at the extra preliminary round with another 109 joining in the preliminary round. The 47 teams that play in the FA Women's National League Division One (tier 4) are given exemption to the second round qualifying, while teams in the Northern and Southern Premier Divisions (tier 3) enter at the second round proper. Teams in the FA Women's Super League and FA Women's Championship (tiers 1 and 2) are exempted to the fourth round proper.

| Round | Clubs remaining | Clubs involved | Winners from previous round | Games played | Goals scored | Prize money | |
| Round | Clubs remaining | Clubs involved | Winners from previous round | Games played | Goals scored | Winner | Loser |
|---|---|---|---|---|---|---|---|
| Extra preliminary round | 376 | 174 | – | 82 | 520 | £300 | £75 |
| Preliminary round | 290 | 196 | 87 | 95 | 540 | £360 | £90 |
| First round qualifying | 192 | 98 | 98 | 49 | 235 | £400 | £100 |
| Second round qualifying | 143 | 96 (Note: 47 FA Women's National League Division One teams added) | 49 | 47 | 228 | £450 | £115 |
| Third round qualifying | 95 | 48 | 48 | 24 | 93 | £600 | £150 |
| First round | 71 | 24 | 24 | 12 | 51 | £850 | £215 |
| Second round | 59 | 36 (Note: 24 FA Women's National League Premier Division teams added) | 12 | 16 | 61 | £1,000 | £250 |
| Third round | 41 | 18 | 18 | 9 | 29 | £1,250 | £315 |
| Fourth round | 32 | 32 (Note: 23 FA Women's Championship and FA WSL teams added) | 9 | 16 | 87 | £2,000 | £500 |
| Fifth round | 16 | 16 | 16 | 8 | 38 | £3,000 | £750 |
| Quarter-final | 8 | 8 | 8 | 4 | 17 | £4,000 | £1,000 |
| Semi-final | 4 | 4 | 4 | 2 | 6 | £5,000 | £1,250 |
| Final | 2 | 2 | 2 | 1 | 3 | £25,000 | £15,000 |

== Extra preliminary round ==
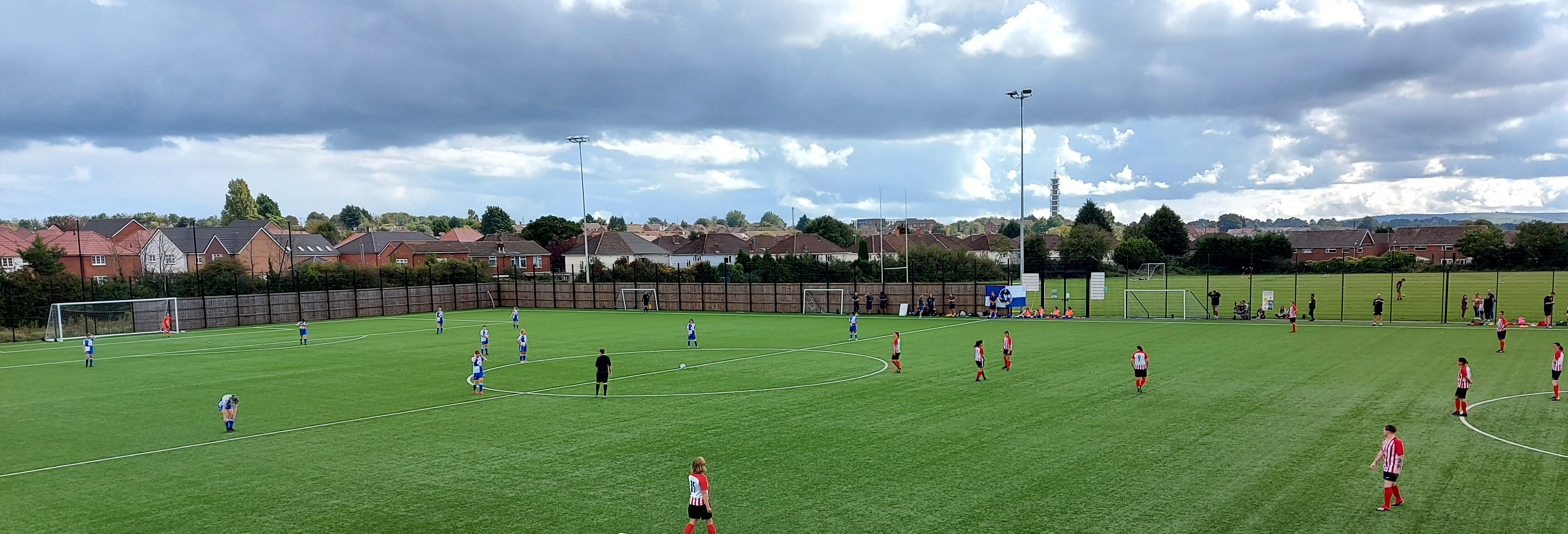
Bristol Rovers (in blue) and Bristol & West prepare to kick off

As a result of 376 teams entering the competition, 174 teams were drawn into an extra preliminary round, which were played on Sunday 6 September 2020.

| Tie | Home team (tier) | Score | Away team (tier) | Att. |
|---|---|---|---|---|
| 1 | Boro Rangers (6) | 0–1 | Workington Reds (6) | |
| 2 | Birtley Town (7) | 0–3 | Bishop Auckland (6) | |
| 3 | Stanwix (7) | 0–6 | South Shields (5) | |
| 4 | Wallsend BC (5) | 6–1 | Hartlepool United (5) | |
| 5 | Gateshead Leam Rangers (7) | 1–3 | CLS Amazons (7) | |
| 6 | Appleby Frodingham (7) | 4–3 | South Cave Sporting Club (7) | |
| 7 | Harworth Colliery (7) | 6–1 | Silsden (7) | |
| 8 | Wakefield Trinity (6) | 5–0 | Hepworth United (6) | |
| 9 | Harrogate Town (5) | 3–1 | Farsley Celtic (5) | |
| 10 | Yorkshire Amateurs (7) | A–W | Altofts (6) | |
Yorkshire Amateurs withdrew.
| 11 | Rotherham United (5) | 3–3 (3–0 p) | Oughtbridge WM (5) | |
| 12 | Crewe Alexandra (5) | 1–0 | West Didsbury & Chorlton (5) | |
| 13 | Tranmere Rovers (5) | 2–3 | Fleetwood Town Wrens (5) | |
| 14 | Cheadle Town Stingers (5) | 5–1 | Chester FC (6) | |
| 15 | Curzon Ashton (6) | 7–2 | Haslingden (7) | |
| 16 | Merseyrail (5) | 5–0 | Mossley AFC (7) | |
| 17 | Didsbury (6) | 1–2 | Northwich Vixens (6) | |
| 18 | FC United of Manchester (5) | 13–0 | West Kirby (6) | 66 |
| 19 | Mossley Hill (5) | 12–0 | Ashton United (7) | |
| 20 | AFC Darwen (6) | 9–0 | Nelson (7) | |
| 21 | Grimsby Borough (6) | H–W | Pride Park (7) | |
Pride Park withdrew.
| 22 | Notts County (6) | 4–4 (2–3 p) | Lincoln United (6) | |
| 23 | AFC Leicester (6) | 0–5 | Woodlands (5) | |
| 24 | Sherwood (6) | H–W | HBW United (7) | |
HBW United withdrew.
| 25 | Rise Park (5) | 3–0 | Asfordby Amateurs (7) | |
| 26 | Dronfield Town (7) | 2–1 | Arnold Eagles (6) | |
| 27 | Arnold Town (6) | A–W | Allexton & New Parks (7) | |
Arnold Town withdrew.
| 28 | Beaumont Park (6) | 6–2 | Groby (7) | |
| 29 | Coalville Town (6) | 2–7 | Oadby & Wigston (6) | |
| 30 | Darlaston Town 1874 (7) | 2–6 | Shifnal Town (6) | |
| 31 | Kingfisher (6) | 0–3 | Knowle (6) | |
| 32 | Sutton Coldfield Town (5) | 5–0 | Coventrians (7) | |
| 33 | Westfields (7) | 2–1 | Leamington Lions (6) | |
| 34 | Shrewsbury Junions (7) | 0–5 | Lye Town (5) | |
| 35 | Coventry Sphinx (5) | 3–0 | Sandwell (6) | |
| 36 | Tamworth (7) | 8–0 | Doveridge (7) | |
| 37 | Solihull Sporting (6) | 1–4 | Kidderminster Harriers (6) | |
| 38 | Cookley Sports (6) | 2–1 | Coundon Court (5) | |
| 39 | Hereford Pegasus (7) | 1–0 | Rugby Borough (7) | |
| 40 | Stourbridge (6) | 8–0 | Port Vale (6) | |
| 41 | Walsall Wood (7) | 0–6 | Redditch United (5) | |
| 42 | Tamworth Academy (6) | 0–15 | Worcester City (5) | |
| 43 | Balls To Cancer (7) | 1–9 | Stockingford AA Pavilion (5) | |
| 44 | Rugby Town (6) | 2–6 | Sedgley & Gornal United (6) | |

| Tie | Home team (tier) | Score | Away team (tier) | Att. |
|---|---|---|---|---|
| 45 | St Ives Town (5) | 12–0 | Hartham United (7) | |
| 46 | Newmarket Town (6) | 3–3 (4–2 p) | Wymondham Town (5) | |
| 47 | Whittlesey Athletic (7) | 1–3 | Peterborough United (5) | |
| 48 | Wroxham (5) | 10–0 | Kettering Town (5) | |
| 49 | Bedford (5) | 12–0 | Corby Town (6) | |
| 50 | Henley Athletic (7) | 4–4 (4–5 p) | March Town (7) | |
| 51 | Northampton Town (5) | 5–0 | Haverhill Rovers (7) | |
| 52 | Aylesford (5) | 1–3 | Ashford (6) | |
| 53 | Herne Bay (6) | 5–1 | Whyteleafe (5) | |
| 54 | Dulwich Hamlet (5) | 6–1 | Margate (7) | |
| 55 | New London Lionesses (6) | 4–2 | Parkwood (6) | |
| 56 | Hastings United (7) | 0–2 | Hackney (6) | |
| 57 | Tunbridge Wells Foresters (7) | 1–1 (4–5 p) | Ramsgate (6) | |
| 58 | Runwell Sports (7) | 0–6 | Harlow Town (5) | |
| 59 | Rayleigh Town (7) | H–W | Hoddesdon Town (6) | |
Hoddesdon Town withdrew.
| 60 | Chelmsford City (7) | 3–2 | Frontiers (7) | |
| 61 | Colney Heath (5) | 2–1 | Herts Vipers (7) | |
| 62 | Hemel Hempstead (7) | 1–3 | Garston (7) | |
| 63 | Abingdon Town (6) | 0–4 | Abingdon United (5) | |
| 64 | Banbury United (7) | 1–2 | Swindon Supermarine (6) | |
| 65 | Woodley United (5) | 5–2 | Wargrave (7) | |
| 66 | Royal Wootton Bassett Town (5) | 1–1 (6–7 p) | Brentford (6) | |
| 67 | Wycombe Wanderers (5) | 4–0 | Oxford City (5) | |
| 68 | Eastbourne United (6) | 1–0 | Pagham (7) | |
| 69 | Badshot Lea (7) | 7–3 | Oakwood (6) | |
| 70 | Walton Casuals (6) | 4–0 | AFC Littlehampton (6) | |
| 71 | Mole Valley (7) | 0–11 | AFC Acorns (6) | |
| 72 | Roffey (7) | 1–4 | Chichester City (7) | |
| 73 | Seaford Town (7) | 1–1 (3–1 p) | Newhaven (6) | |
| 74 | Burgess Hill Town (6) | 0–10 | Saltdean United (5) | |
| 75 | AFC Stoneham (7) | 10–0 | Merley Cobham Sports (7) | |
| 76 | Eastleigh (6) | 1–10 | AFC Bournemouth (5) | |
| 77 | Bournemouth Sports (6) | 21–0 | Redlands (7) | |
| 78 | Alton (6) | 13–0 | Meon Milton (7) | |
| 79 | Longwell Green (7) | 2–2 (5–6 p) | Paulton Rovers (7) | |
| 80 | FC Chippenham (7) | 0–6 | Oldland Abbotonians (6) | |
| 81 | Bristol Ladies Union (6) | 1–1 (2–4 p) | Middlezoy Rovers (5) | |
| 82 | Downend Flyers (6) | 1–2 | AEK Boco (6) | |
| 83 | Bristol Rovers (7) | 6–0 | Bristol & West (7) | |
| 84 | Banwell (7) | 0–10 | Ilminster Town (5) | |
| 85 | St Agnes (6) | 0–1 | Saltash United (7) | |
| 86 | Marine Academy Plymouth (5) | 21–0 | Ottery St Mary (7) | |
| 87 | AFC St Austell (6) | 7–0 | Feniton (6) | |

== Preliminary round ==
98 matches were scheduled for the preliminary round on Sunday 20 September 2020, made up of the 87 winning teams from the extra preliminary round plus the 109 teams that were granted a bye into the preliminary round.

| Tie | Home team (tier) | Score | Away team (tier) | Att. |
|---|---|---|---|---|
| 1 | Lumley (6) | 0–1 | Spennymoor Town (7) | |
| 2 | South Shields (5) | 3–1 | Gateshead Rutherford (7) | |
| 3 | Blyth Town (6) | 7–1 | Guisborough Town (7) | |
| 4 | Washington (6) | 0–7 | Alnwick Town (5) | |
| 5 | Sunderland West End (6) | 7–0 | Carlisle United (6) | |
| 6 | Durham United (7) | 3–4 | Workington Reds (6) | |
| 7 | CLS Amazons (7) | 1–2 | Penrith AFC (6) | |
| 8 | Hartlepool Pools Youth (7) | 0–9 | Wallsend BC (5) | |
| 9 | Redcar Town (5) | 6–1 | Bishop Auckland (6) | |
| 10 | Thackley AFC (7) | 3–3 (3–4 p) | Ripon City (7) | |
| 11 | Hull United (6) | 2–1 | Millmoor Juniors (6) | |
| 12 | Bradford Park Avenue (6) | 1–4 | Ossett United (5) | |
| 13 | Sheffield Wednesday (5) | 3–2 | Harworth Colliery (7) | |
| 14 | Farsley Celtic Juniors (6) | 2–2 (3–1 p) | Harrogate Town (5) | |
| 15 | Brighouse Sports (7) | 6–1 | Appleby Frodingham (7) | |
| 16 | York City (5) | 4–0 | Rotherham United (5) | |
| 17 | Altofts (6) | 3–4 | Wakefield Trinity (6) | |
| 18 | Curzon Ashton (6) | 2–5 | Blackburn Community SC (6) | |
| 19 | Morecambe (5) | 3–0 | Salford City Lionesses (6) | |
| 20 | Rylands (7) | 0–14 | Fleetwood Town Wrens (5) | |
| 21 | AFC Darwen (6) | 6–4 | Sir Tom Finney FC (6) | |
| 22 | FC United of Manchester (5) | 9–0 | Ashton Town (7) | 119 |
| 23 | Altrincham (6) | 0–5 | Northwich Vixens (6) | |
| 24 | Mossley Hill (5) | 1–2 | Wythenshawe Amateurs (6) | |
| 25 | Merseyrail (5) | 7–3 | Cheadle Town Stingers (5) | |
| 26 | SK Vipers (7) | 0–8 | Warrington Wolves Foundation (6) | |
| 27 | Crewe Alexandra (5) | 14–1 | Accrington Stanley Community Trust (6) | |
| 28 | Leicester City Ladies (5) | 7–1 | Oakham United (7) | |
| 29 | Woodlands (5) | 0–2 | Oadby & Wigston (6) | |
| 30 | St Joseph's Rockware of Worksop (6) | 1–1 (1–3 p) | Lincoln Moorlands Railway (6) | |
| 31 | Grimsby Town (6) | 5–1 | Ollerton Town (5) | |
| 32 | Cleethorpes Town (6) | 1–2 | Dronfield Town (7) | |
| 33 | Beaumont Park (6) | 2–1 | Grimsby Borough (6) | |
| 34 | Rise Park (5) | H–W | Allexton & New Parks (7) | |
Allexton & New Parks withdrew.
| 35 | Belper Town (7) | 0–3 | Sherwood (6) | |
| 36 | Nottingham Trent University (7) | 1–2 | Lincoln United (6) | |
| 37 | Westfields (7) | 1–2 | Worcester City (5) | |
| 38 | Stockingford AA Pavilion (5) | 0–3 | Droitwich Spa (6) | |
| 39 | AFC Telford United (6) | 2–3 | Knowle (6) | |
| 40 | Cookley Sports (6) | 2–1 | Sedgley & Gornal United (6) | |
| 41 | Tamworth (7) | 3–2 | Solihull Ladies United (5) | |
| 42 | Hereford Pegasus (7) | 0–7 | Coventry Sphinx (5) | |
| 43 | Kidderminster Harriers (6) | 0–1 | Crusaders (5) | |
| 44 | Lye Town (5) | 1–4 | Sutton Coldfield Town (5) | |
| 45 | Stourbridge (6) | 8–1 | Wyrley (6) | |
| 46 | Shifnal Town (6) | 3–3 (3–5 p) | Redditch United (5) | |
| 47 | Desborough (7) | 0–10 | Netherton United (7) | |
| 48 | Peterborough United (5) | 4–4 (2–4 p) | Royston Town (5) | |
| 49 | Waveney (7) | 2–2 (4–5 p) | Brett Vale (7) | |

| Tie | Home team (tier) | Score | Away team (tier) | Att. |
|---|---|---|---|---|
| 50 | AFC Sudbury (6) | 3–1 | Needham Market (6) | |
| 51 | Peterborough Northern Star (5) | 13–1 | March Town (7) | |
| 52 | Histon (6) | 2–4 | St Ives Town (5) | |
| 53 | Bedford (5) | 1–3 | Northampton Town (5) | |
| 54 | King's Lynn Town (6) | 3–7 | Wroxham (5) | |
| 55 | Bungay Town (7) | 0–5 | Newmarket Town (6) | |
| 56 | Bexhill United (6) | 0–0 (1–4 p) | Sutton United (6) | |
| 57 | Regents Park Rangers (6) | 2–1 | Phoenix Sports (6) | |
| 58 | Haringey Borough (5) | 1–2 | Fulham (5) | |
| 59 | Comets (6) | 1–1 (4–3 p) | Herne Bay (6) | |
| 60 | Millwall Lionesses (6) | 0–8 | New London Lionesses (6) | |
| 61 | Islington Borough (6) | 1–4 | Ashford (6) | |
| 62 | Dartford (5) | 8–0 | Ramsgate (6) | |
| 63 | Hackney (6) | 2–6 | Dulwich Hamlet (5) | |
| 64 | Southend United Community SC (7) | 1–1 (3–1 p) | Houghton Athletic (7) | |
| 65 | Wodson Park (6) | 1–2 | Watford Development (6) | |
| 66 | Chelmsford City (7) | 1–2 | Leigh Ramblers (6) | |
| 67 | Rayleigh Town (7) | 1–9 | Luton Town (5) | |
| 68 | Bowers & Pitsea (5) | 5–0 | Garston (7) | |
| 69 | Colney Heath (5) | 3–4 | Harlow Town (5) | |
| 70 | Denham United (5) | 2–2 (5–3 p) | Queens Park Rangers (5) | |
| 71 | Ascot United (5) | 6–0 | Swindon Supermarine (6) | |
| 72 | Brentford (6) | 1–6 | Ashford Town (Middx) (5) | |
| 73 | Wycombe Wanderers (5) | 2–1 | Eversley & California (7) | |
| 74 | Tilehurst Panthers (6) | 7–1 | Slough Town (7) | |
| 75 | Abingdon United (5) | 6–0 | Newbury (5) | |
| 76 | Woodley United (5) | 5–3 | Milton United (7) | |
| 77 | Steyning Town Community (6) | 1–8 | Worthing (6) | |
| 78 | Seaford Town (7) | 1–2 | Badshot Lea (7) | |
| 79 | AFC Acorns (6) | 2–2 (4–5 p) | Lancing (6) | |
| 80 | Chichester City (7) | 0–3 | Eastbourne Town (5) | |
| 81 | Woking (7) | H–W | Godalming Town (6) | |
Godalming Town withdrew.
| 82 | Eastbourne United (6) | 0–2 | Dorking Wanderers (7) | |
| 83 | Walton Casuals (6) | 3–5 | Saltdean United (5) | |
| 84 | Sherborne Town (6) | 3–0 | Bournemouth Sports (6) | |
| 85 | Alton (6) | 2–5 | AFC Stoneham (7) | |
| 86 | Shanklin (7) | 0–8 | Moneyfields (5) | |
| 87 | New Milton Town (6) | 0–5 | Winchester City Flyers (5) | |
| 88 | United Services Portsmouth (7) | 0–9 | AFC Bournemouth (5) | |
| 89 | Pen Mill (6) | A–W | Ilminster Town (5) | |
Pen Mill withdrew.
| 90 | Weston Super Mare (6) | 2–3 | Portishead Town (5) | |
| 91 | Middlezoy Rovers (5) | 4–3 | Bishops Lydeard (5) | |
| 92 | Oldland Abbotonians (6) | 2–0 | Almondsbury (6) | |
| 93 | Chipping Sodbury Town (6) | 2–4 | Bristol Rovers (7) | |
| 94 | AEK Boco (6) | 4–3 | Paulton Rovers (7) | |
| 95 | Helston Athletic (7) | 5–4 | Saltash United (7) | |
| 96 | Callington Town (5) | 2–1 | Bideford (5) | |
| 97 | Torquay United (5) | 4–0 | RNAS Culdrose (7) | |
| 98 | AFC St Austell (6) | 1–6 | Marine Academy Plymouth (5) | |

== First round qualifying ==
49 matches were scheduled for the first round qualifying on Sunday 4 October 2020, made up of the 98 winning teams from the preliminary round and did not include the introduction of any new teams.

| Tie | Home team (tier) | Score | Away team (tier) | Att. |
|---|---|---|---|---|
| 1 | Penrith AFC (6) | 1–2 | South Shields (5) | |
| 2 | FC United of Manchester (5) | 4–1 | Wakefield Trinity (6) | 89 |
| 3 | Fleetwood Town Wrens (5) | 1–1 (5–4 p) | AFC Darwen (6) | |
| 4 | Brighouse Sports (7) | 2–3 | Blyth Town (6) | |
| 5 | Hull United (6) | 1–2 | Sunderland West End (6) | |
| 6 | Farsley Celtic Juniors (6) | 1–2 | Warrington Wolves Foundation (6) | |
| 7 | Morecambe (5) | 5–2 | Workington Reds (6) | |
| 8 | Blackburn Community SC (6) | 3–2 | Alnwick Town (5) | |
| 9 | Wallsend BC (5) | 2–1 | York City (5) | |
| 10 | Spennymoor Town (7) | 3–3 (4–3 p) | Wythenshawe Amateurs (6) | |
| 11 | Redcar Town (5) | 0–4 | Ossett United (5) | |
| 12 | Ripon City (7) | 1–4 | Merseyrail (5) | |
| 13 | Sutton Coldfield Town (5) | 1–0 | Lincoln United (6) | |
| 14 | Worcester City (5) | 4–1 | Droitwich Spa (6) | |
| 15 | Lincoln Moorlands Railway (6) | 2–3 | Beaumont Park (6) | |
| 16 | Oadby & Wigston (6) | 5–2 | Rise Park (5) | |
| 17 | Crusaders (5) | 4–0 | Cookley Sports (6) | |
| 18 | Tamworth (7) | 1–2 | Dronfield Town (7) | |
| 19 | Leicester City Ladies (5) | 0–9 | Grimsby Town (6) | |
| 20 | Sheffield Wednesday (5) | 1–1 (4–5 p) | Northwich Vixens (6) | |
| 21 | Crewe Alexandra (5) | 1–4 | Coventry Sphinx (5) | |
| 22 | Knowle (6) | 0–6 | Stourbridge (6) | |
| 23 | Redditch United (5) | 4–0 | Sherwood (6) | |
| 24 | Netherton United (7) | 5–4 | Leigh Ramblers (6) | |
| 25 | Northampton Town (5) | 0–1 | St Ives Town (5) | |

| Tie | Home team (tier) | Score | Away team (tier) | Att. |
|---|---|---|---|---|
| 26 | Bowers & Pitsea (5) | 0–1 | Harlow Town (5) | |
| 27 | Royston Town (5) | 8–0 | Brett Vale (7) | |
| 28 | Peterborough Northern Star (5) | 10–0 | Southend United Community SC (7) | |
| 29 | Luton Town (5) | 5–0 | Wroxham (5) | |
| 30 | AFC Sudbury (6) | 3–3 (2–4 p) | Newmarket Town (6) | |
| 31 | Dartford (5) | 7–1 | Winchester City Flyers (5) | |
| 32 | Ascot United (5) | 0–3 | Denham United (5) | |
| 33 | Moneyfields (5) | 1–1 (3–4 p) | AFC Bournemouth (5) | |
| 34 | Lancing (6) | 0–1 | Dulwich Hamlet (5) | |
| 35 | Watford Development (6) | 1–9 | Ashford (6) | |
| 36 | Eastbourne Town (5) | 2–0 | Tilehurst Panthers (6) | |
| 37 | Badshot Lea (7) | 1–6 | Saltdean United (5) | |
| 38 | Comets (6) | 0–1 | Wycombe Wanderers (5) | |
| 39 | Worthing (6) | 6–0 | Sutton United (6) | |
| 40 | Woking (7) | 1–2 | Abingdon United (5) | |
| 41 | Regents Park Rangers (6) | 0–5 | New London Lionesses (6) | |
| 42 | Dorking Wanderers (7) | 1–7 | Ashford Town (Middx) (5) | |
| 43 | Fulham (5) | 5–0 | Woodley United (5) | |
| 44 | Callington Town (5) | 1–2 | Ilminster Town (5) | |
| 45 | Bristol Rovers (7) | 1–1 (3–4 p) | AEK Boco (6) | |
| 46 | Torquay United (5) | 0–12 | Portishead Town (5) | |
| 47 | Sherborne Town (6) | 2–1 | Oldland Abbotonians (6) | |
| 48 | Marine Academy Plymouth (5) | 3–5 | Helston Athletic (7) | |
| 49 | Middlezoy Rovers (5) | 2–2 (1–3 p) | AFC Stoneham (7) | |

== Second round qualifying ==
48 matches were scheduled for the second round qualifying on Sunday 18 October 2020, made up of the 49 winning teams from the first round qualifying and included the introduction of 47 teams from the fourth-tier FA Women's National League Division One.

| Tie | Home team (tier) | Score | Away team (tier) | Att. |
|---|---|---|---|---|
| 1 | Merseyrail (5) | 3–2 | Bolton Ladies (4) | |
| 2 | Stockport County (4) | 0–2 | Leeds United (4) | |
| 3 | Ossett United (5) | 0–5 | Liverpool Feds (4) | |
| 4 | Brighouse Town (4) | 6–0 | Spennymoor Town (7) | |
| 5 | Warrington Wolves Foundation (6) | 2–3 | Durham Cestria (4) | |
| 6 | Blyth Town (6) | 0–5 | Barnsley (4) | |
| 7 | Norton & Stockton Ancients (4) | 2–5 | FC United of Manchester (5) | 100 |
| 8 | Chorley (4) | H–W | Wallsend BC (5) | |
Wallsend Boys Club withdrew.
| 9 | Chester-le-Street (4) | 9–0 | South Shields (5) | |
| 10 | Bradford City (4) | 0–2 | Sunderland West End (6) | |
| 11 | Morecambe (5) | 1–2 | Fleetwood Town Wrens (5) | |
| 12 | Newcastle United (4) | 11–0 | Blackburn Community SC (6) | |
| 13 | Dronfield Town (7) | 1–2 | Coventry Sphinx (5) | |
| 14 | Worcester City (5) | 0–5 | Stourbridge (6) | |
| 15 | Sporting Khalsa (4) | 4–2 | Leafield Athletic (4) | |
| 16 | Sutton Coldfield Town (5) | 0–2 | Wolverhampton Wanderers (4) | 201 |
| 17 | Lincoln City (4) | 10–1 | Burton Albion (4) | |
| 18 | Oadby & Wigston (6) | 2–3 | Crusaders (5) | |
| 19 | Beaumont Park (6) | 1–2 | Boldmere St. Michaels (4) | |
| 20 | Solihull Moors (4) | 2–2 (3–2 p) | Bedworth United (4) | |
| 21 | Holwell Sports (4) | 7–2 | Grimsby Town (6) | |
| 22 | Redditch United (5) | 1–1 (4–1 p) | Doncaster Rovers Belles (4) | |
| 23 | Long Eaton United (4) | 7–1 | Netherton United (7) | |
| 24 | Northwich Vixens (6) | 1–2 | Wem Town (4) | |

| Tie | Home team (tier) | Score | Away team (tier) | Att. |
|---|---|---|---|---|
| 25 | Harlow Town (5) | 5–1 | St Ives Town (5) | |
| 26 | Newmarket Town (6) | 1–5 | Norwich City (4) | |
| 27 | Billericay Town (4) | 4–1 | Cambridge United (4) | |
| 28 | Luton Town (5) | 1–0 | Cambridge City (4) | |
| 29 | Hashtag United (4) | 0–2 | Enfield Town (4) | |
| 30 | Stevenage (4) | 3–3 (3–5 p) | Royston Town (5) | |
| 31 | Ipswich Town (4) | 10–0 | Peterborough Northern Star (5) | |
| 32 | AFC Wimbledon (4) | 6–0 | Ashford (6) | |
| 33 | Actonians (4) | 6–2 | Saltdean United (5) | |
| 34 | New London Lionesses (6) | 1–1 (3–4 p) | Worthing (6) | |
| 35 | Dartford (5) | 1–1 (2–3 p) | Eastbourne Town (5) | |
| 36 | Dulwich Hamlet (5) | 0–1 | Leyton Orient (4) | 582 |
| 37 | Fulham (5) | 1–0 | Wycombe Wanderers (5) | |
| 38 | Maidenhead United (4) | 1–0 | Denham United (5) | |
| 39 | Abingdon United (5) | 1–3 | Chesham United (4) | |
| 40 | Ashford Town (Middx) (5) | 2–2 (4–5 p) | Kent Football United (4) | |
| 41 | AEK Boco (6) | 4–3 | Larkhall Athletic (4) | |
| 42 | Portishead Town (5) | 2–0 | Sherborne Town (6) | |
| 43 | Cheltenham Town (4) | 3–0 | Brislington (4) | |
| 44 | Exeter City (4) | 2–1 | Swindon Town (4) | |
| 45 | AFC Stoneham (7) | 1–6 | Buckland Athletic (4) | |
| 46 | Ilminster Town (5) | 4–1 | Poole Town (4) | |
| 47 | Helston Athletic (7) | 0–11 | Southampton (4) | |
| 48 | Southampton Women (4) | 1–3 | AFC Bournemouth (5) | |

== Third round qualifying ==
24 matches were scheduled for the third round qualifying on Sunday 1 November 2020, made up of the 48 winning teams from the second round qualifying and did not include the introduction of any new teams.

| Tie | Home team (tier) | Score | Away team (tier) | Att. |
|---|---|---|---|---|
| 1 | Fleetwood Town Wrens (5) | 0–3 | Liverpool Feds (4) | |
| 2 | FC United of Manchester (5) | 2–1 | Chorley (4) | |
| 3 | Barnsley (4) | 4–1 | Leeds United (4) | |
| 4 | Brighouse Town (4) | 3–0 | Merseyrail (5) | |
| 5 | Newcastle United (4) | 4–1 | Sunderland West End (6) | |
| 6 | Chester-le-Street (4) | 3–2 | Durham Cestria (4) | |
| 7 | Solihull Moors (4) | 3–0 | Sporting Khalsa (4) | |
| 8 | Holwell Sports (4) | 0–2 | Lincoln City (4) | |
| 9 | Stourbridge (6) | 3–0 | Crusaders (5) | |
| 10 | Wem Town (4) | 4–3 | Coventry Sphinx (5) | |
| 11 | Long Eaton United (4) | 0–1 | Wolverhampton Wanderers (4) | 126 |
| 12 | Redditch United (5) | 1–2 | Boldmere St. Michaels (4) | |

| Tie | Home team (tier) | Score | Away team (tier) | Att. |
|---|---|---|---|---|
| 13 | Luton Town (5) | 1–2 | Enfield Town (4) | |
| 14 | Harlow Town (5) | 3–3 (4–2 p) | Royston Town (5) | |
| 15 | Billericay Town (4) | 2–1 | Chesham United (4) | |
| 16 | Norwich City (4) | 1–3 | Ipswich Town (4) | |
| 17 | Actonians (4) | 4–0 | Worthing (6) | |
| 18 | Fulham (5) | 1–2 | Maidenhead United (4) | |
| 19 | Kent Football United (4) | 3–1 | AFC Wimbledon (4) | |
| 20 | Eastbourne Town (5) | 1–4 | Leyton Orient (4) | |
| 21 | Exeter City (4) | 7–0 | AEK Boco (6) | |
| 22 | Cheltenham Town (4) | 3–1 | Portishead Town (5) | |
| 23 | AFC Bournemouth (5) | 3–1 | Buckland Athletic (4) | |
| 24 | Ilminster Town (5) | 0–4 | Southampton (4) | |

== First round proper ==
Twelve matches were scheduled for the first round proper, pending a fixture date due to restrictions caused by the COVID-19 pandemic. The round was eventually scheduled for Sunday 13 December 2020. The round was made up of the 24 winners from the previous round and did not include the introduction of any new teams.

Number of teams per tier still in competition
| Super League | Championship | Premier Division | Division One | Regional & County | Total |
|---|---|---|---|---|---|
| 12 / 12 | 11 / 11 | 24 / 24 | 20 / 20 | 4 / 4 | 71 / 71 |

| 13 December 2020 | AFC Bournemouth (5) | 0–5 | Southampton (4) | Verwood |
| | | Report | Kendall 2', 29'; Panting 6'; Pusey 9', 70' | Stadium: Potterne Park; Attendance: 0 |

| 13 December 2020 | Billericay Town (4) | 4–0 | Maidenhead United (4) | Billericay |
| | Addison 47', 56', 68', 80' | Report | | Stadium: New Lodge; Attendance: 0 |

| 13 December 2020 | Chester Le Street Town (4) | 0–3 | Brighouse Town (4) | Chester-le-Street |
| | | Report | Gompertz; Lee | Stadium: Moor Park; Attendance: 0 |

| 13 December 2020 | Exeter City (4) | 1–1 (a.e.t.) (3–4 p) | Cheltenham Town (4) | Exeter |
| | Britton 90' (pen.) | Report | Haynes 34' | Stadium: The Hub; Attendance: 0 |
| | Penalties |
| | Britton (penalty scored); Suominen (penalty scored); Toogood (penalty scored); Baker (penalty missed); Kaptein (penalty missed) | | (penalty scored) Criddle; (penalty scored) Haynes; (penalty scored) Bevan; (penalty scored) Halford |

| 13 December 2020 | FC United of Manchester (5) | 1–2 | Liverpool Feds (4) | Moston |
| | Goal | Report | Fisher 7', 24' | Stadium: Broadhurst Park; Attendance: 121; Referee: Leoni Harland |

| 13 December 2020 | Harlow Town (5) | 2–9 | Ipswich Town (4) | Harlow |
| | Manning 19'; Box 26' | Report | N. Thomas 5', 73'; G. Allen 7', 17', 40'; King 16', 31'; Peskett 43'; Lafayette 45' | Stadium: Harlow Arena; Attendance: 0 |

| 13 December 2020 | Leyton Orient (4) | 2–1 | Actonians (4) | Upminster |
| | Trezzi 90'; Smith 90' | Report | D'Santos 73' | Stadium: Hornchurch Stadium; Attendance: 0 Referee: Adriana Bucur |

| 13 December 2020 | Lincoln City (4) | 3–1 | Solihull Moors (4) | Lincoln |
| | McHamilton 8', 55'; Blinkhorn 40' | Report | Jefferies 25' | Stadium: Yarborough Leisure Centre; Attendance: 0 Referee: Amy Barber |

| 13 December 2020 | Newcastle United (4) | 3–1 | Barnsley (4) | Woolsington |
| | Barker 4'; Soulsby 16'; Gibson 85' | Report | Greene 52' | Stadium: Druid Park; Attendance: 0 |

| 13 December 2020 | Wolverhampton Wanderers (4) | 3–0 | Stourbridge (6) | Wolverhampton |
| | Price 37'; Cross 64'; Darby 87' | Report | | Stadium: Sir Jack Hayward Training Ground; Attendance: 0 Referee: J. Griffiths |

| 20 December 2020 | Wem Town (4) | 4–3 | Boldmere St Michaels (4) | Telford |
| | Bebbington; Doster; L. Williams | Report | Cooper 80' (pen.); Weston 11', 37' | Stadium: Oakengates Leisure Centre; Attendance: 0 |

| 31 March 2021 | Kent Football United (4) | 1–1 (a.e.t.) (4–3 p) | Enfield Town (4) | Dartford |
| | Goad 12' | Report | Makewell 58' | Stadium: Efes Stadium; Referee: 0 |
| | Penalties |
| | Penalty missed Penalty scored | | Penalty missed Penalty scored |

== Second round proper ==
18 matches were scheduled for the second round proper originally scheduled for Sunday 3 January 2021. The round was made up of the 12 winners from the previous round and included the introduction of 24 teams from the third-tier FA Women's National League Premier Division. With only one game able to go ahead, the competition was suspended on 4 January 2021 following further government restrictions on non-elite sport due to the ongoing COVID-19 pandemic. The competition recommenced on 31 March, with the second-round matches being held on 4 April.

Number of teams per tier still in competition
| Super League | Championship | Premier Division | Division One | Regional & County | Total |
|---|---|---|---|---|---|
| 12 / 12 | 11 / 11 | 24 / 24 | 12 / 20 | 0 / 4 | 59 / 71 |

| 3 January 2021 | Liverpool Feds (4) | 2–3 (a.e.t.) | Huddersfield Town (3) | Aigburth |
| | Cole 75' | Report | Mallin 52' | Stadium: Jericho Lane; Attendance: 150 |

| 4 April 2021 | Billericay Town (4) | 2–1 | Ipswich Town (4) | Billericay |
| | Addison 31', 88' | Report | Grey 27' | Stadium: New Lodge; Attendance: 0 |

| 4 April 2021 | Brighouse Town (4) | 3–0 (a.e.t.) | Newcastle United (4) | Brighouse |
| | Woodruff 95', 117'; Greene 99' | Report | | Stadium: St Giles Road; Attendance: 0 |

| 4 April 2021 | Burnley (3) | 1–0 (a.e.t.) | AFC Fylde (3) | Padiham |
| | Worthington 119' | Report | | Stadium: Arbories Memorial Sports Ground; Attendance: 0 Referee: C Hodgson |

| 4 April 2021 | Cardiff City (3) | 0–1 | Oxford United (3) | Ystrad Mynach |
| | | Report | Brown 2' | Stadium: CCB Centre for Sporting Excellence; Attendance: 0 |

| 4 April 2021 | Chichester & Selsey (3) | 3–1 | Kent Football United (4) | Selsey |
| | Yeates 60'; Simmonds 71', 88' | Report | Russ 58' | Stadium: Bunn Leisure Stadium; Attendance: 0 |

| 4 April 2021 | Crawley Wasps (3) | 2–3 | Gillingham (3) | Horley |
| | Cole 7'; Stephens 56' | Report | Maple 45'; Charles 83', 70' | Stadium: The New Defence; Attendance: 0 |

| 4 April 2021 | Hounslow (3) | 0–4 | Leyton Orient (4) | Rayners Lane |
| | | Report | Long 26'; Laudat 34'; Denny 37', 56' | Stadium: The Tithe Farm Social Club; Attendance: 0 |

| 4 April 2021 | Keynsham Town (3) | 0–1 | Yeovil United (3) | Keynsham |
| | | Report | Lloyd 70' | Stadium: Crown Field; Attendance: 0 |

| 4 April 2021 | Loughborough Foxes (3) | 0–6 | Derby County (3) | Loughborough |
| | | Report | Gilliatt 2', 75'; Domingo 48', 56'; Hamilton 67' (pen.); Rai 77' | Stadium: Loughborough University Stadium; Attendance: 0 |

| 4 April 2021 | Middlesbrough (3) | 3–1 | Hull City (3) | Billingham |
| | Dale 38'; Bell 81'; Marshall 86' | Report | Thompson 16' | Stadium: Bedford Terrace; Attendance: 0 |

| 4 April 2021 | Portsmouth (3) | 2–0 (a.e.t.) | Cheltenham Town (4) | Havant |
| | Bradley 100'; Bath 108' | Report | | Stadium: Westleigh Park; Attendance: 0 |
Note: Portsmouth won 2–0 but later disqualified for fielding an ineligible player.

| 4 April 2021 | Southampton (4) | 3–0 | Plymouth Argyle (3) | Totton |
| | Kendall 34'; Panting 44'; Parnell 77' | Report | | Stadium: Testwood Stadium; Attendance: 0 |

| 4 April 2021 | Stoke City (3) | W–O | Wem Town (4) |
| | | Report |
Note: Stoke City withdrew

| 4 April 2021 | Sunderland (3) | 5–1 | Sheffield (3) | Cleadon |
| | Ramshaw 2'; Manders 28'; Blackey 42', 60', 90+1' | Report | Herron 56' (o.g.) | Stadium: Academy of Light; Attendance: 0 |

| 4 April 2021 | Watford (3) | 3–1 | Milton Keynes Dons (3) | Kings Langley |
| | Kmita 47', 62', 66' | Report | Bell 8' | Stadium: Gaywood Park; Attendance: 0 Referee: DeeAn Foster |

| 4 April 2021 | West Bromwich Albion (3) | 5–2 | Lincoln City (4) | Sutton Coldfield |
| | Arber 1'; Murray 9'; Owen 55'; Stamps 79'; Davies 85' | Report | McHamilton 82', 86' | Stadium: Central Ground; Attendance: 0 |

| 4 April 2021 | Wolverhampton Wanderers (4) | 2–2 (a.e.t.) (5–4 p) | Nottingham Forest (3) | Wolverhampton |
| | Edwards 65'; Cross 93' | Report | Axten 49', 105' | Stadium: Castlecroft Stadium; Attendance: 0 Referee: Chloe Matthews |
| | Penalties |
| | Morphett (penalty scored); Walker (penalty scored); Palmer (penalty scored); Dickin (penalty scored); Price (penalty missed); Danby (penalty scored) | | (penalty scored) Brown; (penalty missed) Harkin; (penalty scored) Moncaster; (penalty scored) James; (penalty scored) Axten; (penalty missed) Cook |

== Third round proper ==
Nine matches were played on Sunday 11 April 2021. The round was made up of the 18 winners from the previous round and did not include the introduction of any new teams.

Number of teams per tier still in competition
| Super League | Championship | Premier Division | Division One | Regional & County | Total |
|---|---|---|---|---|---|
| 12 / 12 | 11 / 11 | 11 / 24 | 7 / 20 | 0 / 4 | 41 / 71 |

| 11 April 2021 | Burnley (3) | 0–0 (a.e.t.) (3–1 p) | Sunderland (3) | Padiham |
| | | Report | | Stadium: Arbories Memorial Sports Ground; Attendance: 0 Referee: Declan Brown |
| | Penalties |
| | Bickett (penalty scored); K. Thomas (penalty scored); Worthington (penalty missed); Dykes (penalty scored) | | (penalty scored) Scarr; (penalty missed) Brown; (penalty missed) McCatty; (penalty missed) Griffiths |

| 11 April 2021 | Cheltenham Town (4) | 1–2 (a.e.t.) | Gillingham (3) | Cheltenham |
| | Goal | Report | Goal | Stadium: Whaddon Road; Attendance: 0 |

| 11 April 2021 | Huddersfield Town (3) | 1–1 (a.e.t.) (5–3 p) | Brighouse Town (4) | Huddersfield |
| | Sanderson 51' | Report | Woodruff 15' | Stadium: The Stafflex Arena; Attendance: 0 |
| | Penalties |
| | Penalty scored | | Penalty scored Penalty missed |

| 11 April 2021 | Leyton Orient (4) | 1–2 | Chichester & Selsey (3) | Leyton |
| | Long 17' | Report | Phelps 3'; Wild 42' | Stadium: Brisbane Road; Attendance: 0 |

| 11 April 2021 | Middlesbrough (3) | 4–0 | Wem Town (4) | Billingham |
| | Wilson 24', 77'; Dixon 62'; Maxwell 80' | Report | | Stadium: Bedford Terrace; Attendance: 0 |

| 11 April 2021 | Oxford United (3) | 3–1 | Billericay Town (4) | Marston |
| | Johns 23'; McLachlan 56'; E. Allen 85' | Report | Morton 77' | Stadium: Court Place Farm; Attendance: 0 |

| 11 April 2021 | Southampton (4) | 3–0 | Yeovil United (3) | Totton |
| | Sievewright 30'; Pharoah 67'; Panting 75' | Report | | Stadium: Testwood Stadium; Attendance: 0 |

| 11 April 2021 | Watford (3) | 1–4 | Wolverhampton Wanderers (4) | Kings Langley |
| | O'Leary 41' | Report | Cross 9'; Darby 52'; Morphet 72'; Palmer 76' | Stadium: Gaywood Park; Attendance: 0 Referee: S. Fullicks |

| 11 April 2021 | West Bromwich Albion (3) | 1–4 | Derby County (3) | Sutton Coldfield |
| | Owen 20' | Report | Michalska 2', 59'; Gilliatt 11', 73' | Stadium: Central Ground; Attendance: 0 |

== Fourth round proper ==
16 matches were played on the weekend of 18 April 2021. The round was made up of the nine winners from the previous round and introduced 23 teams from the first and second-tier FA Women's Super League and FA Women's Championship.

Number of teams per tier still in competition
| Super League | Championship | Premier Division | Division One | Regional & County | Total |
|---|---|---|---|---|---|
| 12 / 12 | 11 / 11 | 7 / 24 | 2 / 20 | 0 / 4 | 32 / 71 |

| 16 April 2021 | Chelsea (1) | 5–0 | London City Lionesses (2) | Kingston upon Thames |
| 19:00 | Charles 21'; Carter 29'; Leupolz 35'; Spence 56', 79' | Report | | Stadium: Kingsmeadow; Referee: Chloe Anderson |

| 17 April 2021 | Manchester City (1) | 8–0 | Aston Villa (1) | Manchester |
| 12:00 | Kelly 16', 41', 84'; White 34'; Beckie 50'; Stanway 59'; Lavelle 72'; Mewis 90' | Report | | Stadium: Academy Stadium |

| 18 April 2021 | Birmingham City (1) | 5–1 | Coventry United (2) | Solihull |
| 12:30 | Walker 3', 77'; Murphy 66'; Mayling 90+1', 90+3' | Report | Stevens 90+2' | Stadium: Damson Park |

| 18 April 2021 | West Ham United (1) | 11–0 | Chichester & Selsey (3) | Dagenham |
| 13:00 | van Egmond 2' (pen.), 6', 20', 23'; Dali 10'; Flaherty 28'; Svitková 45'; Mustafa 59'; Redisch 71'; Longhurst 82' (pen.); Denton 84' | Report | | Stadium: Victoria Road; Referee: Sarah Garrett |

| 18 April 2021 | Leicester City (2) | 1–0 | Liverpool (2) | Quorn |
| 14:00 | Cain 72' | Report | | Stadium: Farley Way Stadium |

| 18 April 2021 | Middlesbrough (3) | 0–9 | Sheffield United (2) | Billingham |
| 14:00 | | Report | Lord-Mears 30', 34', 68'; Rayner 40'; Sweetman-Kirk 45+2', 53', 57'; Cusack 63'; Watson 86' | Stadium: Bedford Terrace |

| 18 April 2021 | Burnley (3) | 0–6 | Manchester United (1) | Leyland |
| 14:00 | | Report | M. Turner 11'; Toone 16'; Staniforth 29'; A. Turner 44'; Hanson 47', 58' | Stadium: County Ground; Referee: Jane Simms |

| 18 April 2021 | Everton (1) | 2–1 | Durham (2) | Liverpool |
| 14:00 | Pattinson 51'; Sørensen 90+1' | Report | Sharpe 46' | Stadium: Walton Hall Park |

| 18 April 2021 | Huddersfield Town (3) | 3–2 | Derby County (3) | Huddersfield |
| 14:00 | Elford 15', 76'; Sanderson 72' | | Joyce 18'; Ward 83' | Stadium: Storthes Hall |

| 18 April 2021 | Reading (1) | 2–3 (a.e.t.) | Tottenham Hotspur (1) | Reading |
| 14:00 | F. Williams 12'; Rowe 49' | Report | Kennedy 20'; R. Williams 48'; Naz 93' | Stadium: Madejski Stadium, |

| 18 April 2021 | Oxford United (3) | 1–2 (a.e.t.) | Charlton Athletic (2) | Oxford |
| 14:00 | Gotch 23' (o.g.) | Report | Lumsden 16'; Godden 107' | Stadium: Marsh Lane |

| 18 April 2021 | Arsenal (1) | 10–0 | Gillingham (3) | Borehamwood |
| 14:00 | Roord 7', 21', 42'; Mead 12', 89'; Little 15'; Miedema 16'; Patten 60'; van de Donk 70'; Nobbs 72' | Report | | Stadium: Meadow Park |

| 18 April 2021 | Lewes (2) | 1–2 | Southampton (4) | Lewes |
| 14:00 | Umotong 62' | Report | Freeland 39'; Panting 78' | Stadium: The Dripping Pan |

| 18 April 2021 | Brighton & Hove Albion (1) | 1–0 | Bristol City (1) | Crawley |
| 14:00 | Kaagman 64' (pen.) | Report | | Stadium: Broadfield Stadium |

| 18 April 2021 | Crystal Palace (2) | 3–0 | London Bees (2) | Bromley |
| 14:00 | Wilson 5'; Haines 18'; Khassal 24' | Report | | Stadium: Hayes Lane |

| 18 April 2021 | Wolverhampton Wanderers (4) | 2–5 | Blackburn Rovers (2) | Castlecroft |
| 15:00 | Miller 10'; Walker 57' | Report | Edwards 26'; Jordan 41'; Hughes 55'; Walters 69' (pen.), 73' | Stadium: CKW Stadium |

== Fifth round proper ==
Eight matches were scheduled for the fifth round proper and played Sunday 16 May 2021 with the exception of Chelsea who were competing in the 2021 UEFA Women's Champions League Final on that day and as such had their FA Cup game against Everton rescheduled to Thursday 20 May 2021. The round was made up of the 16 winners from the previous round.

Number of teams per tier still in competition
| Super League | Championship | Premier Division | Division One | Regional & County | Total |
|---|---|---|---|---|---|
| 9 / 12 | 5 / 11 | 1 / 24 | 1 / 20 | 0 / 4 | 16 / 71 |

| 16 May 2021 | Blackburn Rovers (2) | 0–1 | Charlton Athletic (2) | Bamber Bridge |
| 12:00 | | Report | King 78' | Stadium: Sir Tom Finney Stadium; Referee: Elizabeth Simms |

| 16 May 2021 | Brighton & Hove Albion (1) | 6–0 | Huddersfield Town (3) | Crawley |
| 12:00 | Heroum 16'; Jarrett 26'; Davies 36' (o.g.); Gibbons 65'; Kerkdijk 68', 78' | Report | | Stadium: Broadfield Stadium |

| 16 May 2021 | Manchester United (1) | 2–3 | Leicester City (2) | Leigh |
| 12:00 | Sigsworth 32'; Ross 59' | Report | O'Brien 45+1'; Cain 69'; Flint 71' | Stadium: Leigh Sports Village; Referee: Rebecca Welch |

| 16 May 2021 | Birmingham City (1) | 3–2 | Southampton (4) | Solihull |
| 12:30 | Green 37'; Murphy 58'; Mayling 67' | Report | Morris 84'; Pusey 87' | Stadium: Damson Park |

| 16 May 2021 | Manchester City (1) | 5–1 | West Ham United (1) | Manchester |
| 14:00 | White 15'; Beckie 39'; Lavelle 74'; Mewis 90+2'; Hemp 90+4' | Report | Denton 17' | Stadium: Academy Stadium |

| 16 May 2021 | Tottenham Hotspur (1) | 2–1 (a.e.t.) | Sheffield United (2) | Edgware |
| 14:00 | Quinn 30'; Graham 109' | Report | Watson 80' | Stadium: The Hive Stadium; Referee: Abigail Byrne |

| 16 May 2021 | Arsenal (1) | 9–0 | Crystal Palace (2) | Borehamwood |
| 15:00 | Little 6'; Mead 42'; van de Donk 45'; Maritz 62', 88'; Nobbs 70'; Miedema 77'; Roord 86'; McCabe 90' | Report | | Stadium: Meadow Park |

| 20 May 2021 | Chelsea (1) | 3–0 | Everton (1) | Kingston upon Thames |
| 19:00 | Reiten 29'; Kerr 77'; Spence 86' | Report | | Stadium: Kingsmeadow; Referee: Kirsty Dowle |

== Quarter-finals ==
Following a three-month hiatus to the competition during the second round proper from 4 January to 4 April 2021 due to government guidelines, the final stages of 2020–21 Women's FA Cup were delayed until the 2021–22 season. The competition recommenced at the quarter-final stage on Wednesday 29 September 2021. As a result of playing the competition across two seasons, clubs were able to register new players barring certain restrictions: any player who had not yet featured in the 2020–21 Women's FA Cup could be registered. Up to three players who appeared in the competition for teams that had been eliminated prior to the quarter-final stage could be registered for their new club but no player who appeared for a different team still in the quarter-finals could be registered.

Number of teams per tier still in competition
| Super League | Championship | Premier Division | Division One | Regional & County | Total |
|---|---|---|---|---|---|
| 6 / 12 | 2 / 11 | 0 / 24 | 0 / 20 | 0 / 4 | 4 / 71 |

| 29 September 2021 | Manchester City (1) | 6–0 | Leicester City (2*) | Manchester |
| 19:00 | Shaw 46', 61', 85'; Losada 53'; Greenwood 71' (pen.); Angeldal 88' | Report | | Stadium: Academy Stadium; Referee: Lucy May |
Note: *Leicester City began the competition as a second division team but will contest the latter part as a first division team following promotion at the end of the 2020–21 season.

| 29 September 2021 | Birmingham City (1) | 0–4 | Chelsea (1) | Birmingham |
| 19:45 | | Report | Kerr 61'; Kirby 70', 72'; Harder 90+3' | Stadium: St Andrew's; Referee: Elizabeth Simms |

| 29 September 2021 | Arsenal (1) | 5–1 | Tottenham Hotspur (1) | Borehamwood |
| 19:15 | Iwabuchi 15'; Wubben-Moy 32'; Foord 36', 73'; Parris 44' | Report | R. Williams 3' | Stadium: Meadow Park; Attendance: 1,563; Referee: Kirsty Dowle |

| 29 September 2021 | Brighton & Hove Albion (1) | 1–0 | Charlton Athletic (2) | Crawley |
| 19:00 | Gibbons 68' | Report | | Stadium: Broadfield Stadium; Referee: Emily Heaslip |

== Semi-finals ==
The semi-finals were played on Sunday 31 October 2021 and both televised by the BBC.

Number of teams per tier still in competition
| Super League | Championship | Premier Division | Division One | Regional & County | Total |
|---|---|---|---|---|---|
| 4 / 12 | 0 / 11 | 0 / 24 | 0 / 20 | 0 / 4 | 4 / 71 |

| 31 October 2021 | Manchester City (1) | 0–3 | Chelsea (1) | Manchester |
| 12:45 | | Report | Cuthbert 23'; Leupolz 28'; England 89' | Stadium: Academy Stadium; Attendance: 1,343; Referee: Rebecca Welch |

| 31 October 2021 | Arsenal (1) | 3–0 | Brighton & Hove Albion (1) | Borehamwood |
| 16:45 | Little 50'; Mead 54'; Williamson 76' | Report | | Stadium: Meadow Park; Attendance: 1,328; Referee: Abigail Byrne |

== Final ==
The final was played at Wembley Stadium on Sunday 5 December 2021.

5 December 2021
15:00 GMT

| Arsenal | 0–3 | Chelsea |
|---|---|---|
| | Report | Kirby 3'; Kerr 57', 77' |

Wembley Stadium, London
Attendance: 40,942
Referee: Helen Conley (Durham)

== Television rights ==
| Round | BBC | BT | Ref. |
|---|---|---|---|
| Quarter-finals | Arsenal v Tottenham Hotspur (BBC Four) | | |
| Semi-finals | Manchester City v Chelsea (BBC One); Arsenal v Brighton and Hove Albion (BBC Two) | | |
| Final | Arsenal v Chelsea (BBC One and BT Sport 1) | | |
