= Inessa Kaagman =

Dutch footballer (born 1996)

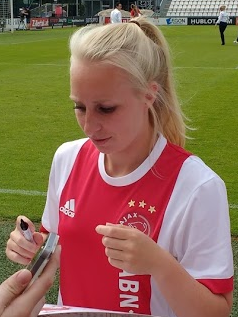
- Kaagman with Ajax in 2018

Personal information
- Full name: Inessa Naberman-Kaagman
- Date of birth: 17 April 1996 (age 30)
- Place of birth: Hoorn, Netherlands
- Height: 1.70 m (5 ft 7 in)
- Position: Midfielder

Team information
- Current team: FC Twente
- Number: 23

Youth career
- 2008–2013: Hollandia

Senior career*
Years	Team	Apps	(Gls)
2013–2018	Ajax	102	(15)
2018–2020	Everton	31	(5)
2020–2022	Brighton & Hove Albion	42	(12)
2022–2024	PSV	19	(5)
2024–2025	Ajax	11	(0)
2025–2026	SC Heerenveen	8	(1)
2026	Hera United	11	(1)
2026–	FC Twente	0	(0)

International career^{‡}
2011	Netherlands U15	5	(0)
2011–2013	Netherlands U17	15	(1)
2013–2015	Netherlands U19	21	(5)
2019–	Netherlands	12	(0)
Medal record
Women's football
Representing the Netherlands
FIFA Women's World Cup
Runner-up	2019 France
- * Club domestic league appearances and goals as of 15 September 2023 ‡ National team caps and goals as of 29 November 2021

Inessa Naberman-Kaagman (née Kaagman, born 17 April 1996), is a Dutch professional footballer who plays as a midfielder for Eredivisie club FC Twente and the Netherlands national team.

== Club career ==
=== Ajax ===
Kaagman joined Ajax in 2013, having spent her youth with Hollandia. She made her senior on 30 August 2013 during a BeNe League draw away to Club Brugge, the first of eighteen appearances during the 2013–14 season. She scored twice in eleven matches in 2014–15, prior to netting four goals in twenty-four matches in the newly reformed Eredivisie. In the following two campaigns, Kaagman scored nine more goals; including her last for Ajax on 6 May 2018 against PEC Zwolle. She won two Eredivisie titles with Ajax.

=== Everton ===
On 22 May 2018, Kaagman joined English FA WSL club Everton in a player exchange deal involving Marthe Munsterman. She made her debut for the club on 26 August 2018 in a 1–0 defeat against second-tier side Durham in the League Cup and scored her first Everton goal in the same competition on 16 September in a 3–2 home win against Reading. On 2 December 2018, Kaagman scored from 30 yards in a 2–1 win over Merseyside rivals Liverpool, the first goal scored under new manager Willie Kirk. The strike was voted as the team's goal of the season at the end of the campaign. On 21 May 2020, Kaagman left Everton following the expiration of her contract.

=== Brighton & Hove Albion ===
After departing Everton, Kaagman moved across the WSL to sign with Brighton & Hove Albion on 17 July 2020; penning a one-year contract. She scored on her debut against Birmingham City on 6 September 2020.

=== PSV ===
After 4 years in England Kaagman moved back to the Netherlands and signed for PSV.

== International career ==
Kaagman represented the Netherlands at youth level, firstly with the U15s. She won nine caps for the U17s in qualification for the UEFA Women's Under-17 Championships between 2012 and 2013. In July 2014, Kaagman was part of the Dutch squad that won the 2014 UEFA Women's Under-19 Championship in Norway, she scored once (vs. Belgium in the groups) They failed to qualify for the 2015 UEFA Women's Under-19 Championship, but Kaagman scored three qualifying goals. Kaagman received a call-up to the seniors for a 2019 World Cup qualifier against Norway in August 2018 but didn't feature.

Kaagman made her senior international debut on 19 January 2019 against South Africa, featuring for the first half of a victory at the Cape Town Stadium in front of 27,000 fans. She was selected for the 2019 FIFA Women's World Cup by manager Sarina Wiegman.

== Personal life ==
On 17 September 2023, Kaagman announced via her Instagram that she was expecting her first baby with partner Karlo Naberman.In July 2026, Kaagman and Naberman married. She has since been referred to as Inessa Naberman-Kaagman in official press releases.

== Career statistics ==
=== Club ===
As of 21 October 2020.

Club statistics
Club	Season	League			Cup		League Cup		Continental		Total	
Club	Season	Division	Apps	Goals	Apps	Goals	Apps	Goals	Apps	Goals	Apps	Goals
Ajax	2013–14	BeNe League	18	0	0	0	—		—		18	0
Ajax	2014–15	BeNe League	11	2	0	0	—		—		11	2
Ajax	2015–16	Eredivisie	24	4	0	0	—		—		24	4
Ajax	2016–17	Eredivisie	26	2	0	0	—		—		26	2
Ajax	2017–18	Eredivisie	23	7	0	0	—		4 (Note: Appearance(s) in the UEFA Women's Champions League)	0	27	7
Ajax	Total		102	15	0	0	0	0	4	0	106	15
Everton	2018–19	FA WSL	19	4	1	0	3	1	—		23	5
Everton	2019–20	FA WSL	12	1	2	3	4	1	—		18	5
Everton	Total		31	5	3	3	7	2	0	0	41	10
Brighton & Hove Albion	2020–21	FA WSL	5	1	0	0	0	0	—		5	1
Career total			137	20	3	3	7	2	4	0	151	26

=== International ===
As of match played 29 November 2021

Appearances and goals by national team and year
National team	Year	Apps	Goals
Netherlands
Netherlands	2019	3	0
Netherlands	2020	7	0
Netherlands	2021	2	0
Total		12	0

== Honours ==
Ajax

- KNVB Women's Cup: 2013–14, 2016–17
- Eredivisie: 2016–17, 2017–18

Netherlands U19

- UEFA Women's Under-19 Championship: 2014

Individual

- Ajax Talent of the Year: 2014–15
- Brighton & Hove Albion Player of the Season: 2020-21
