= Felicity Gibbons =

English footballer

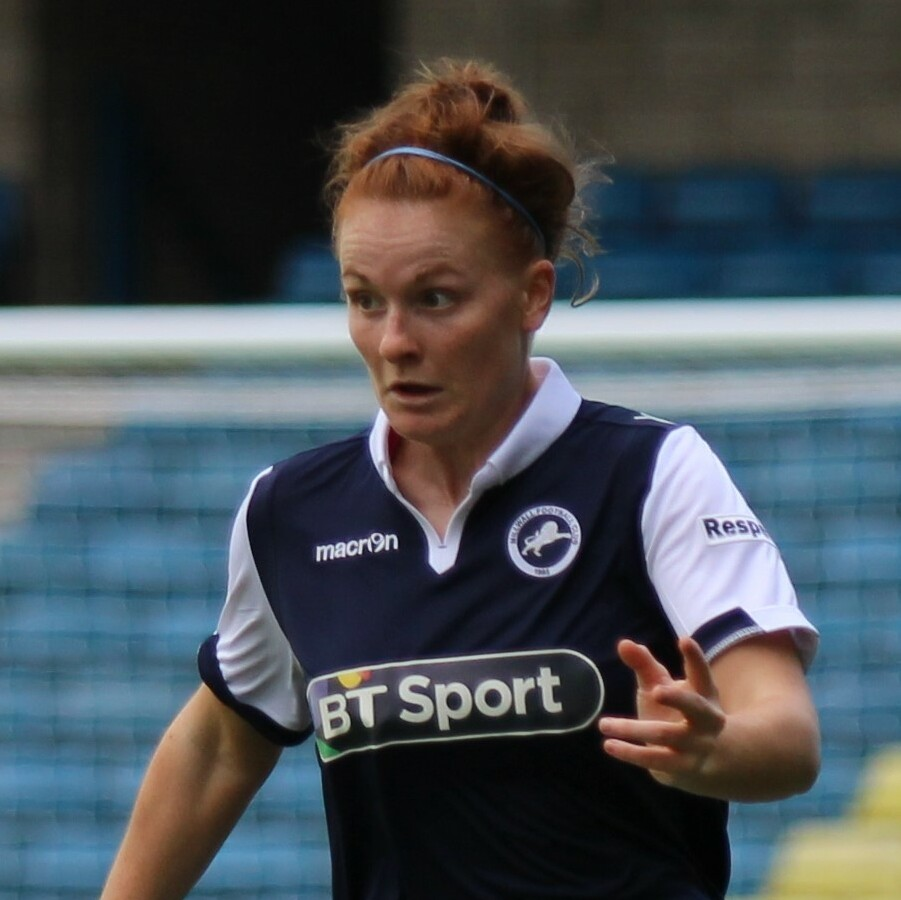
- Gibbons playing for Millwall in 2015

Personal information
- Full name: Felicity Gibbons
- Date of birth: 9 July 1994 (age 32)
- Place of birth: Maidstone, England
- Positions: Defender; striker

Team information
- Current team: Crystal Palace
- Number: 3

Youth career
- Castle Colts

Senior career*
Years	Team	Apps	(Gls)
2010–2013	Charlton Athletic		
2013–2014	Watford F.C.		
2013	→ Gillingham W.F.C. (loan)		
2014–2015	Brighton & Hove Albion	17	(10)
2015–2016	Millwall Lionesses	17	(10)
2016–2017	Gillingham	19	(33)
2017–2022	Brighton & Hove Albion	75	(1)
2022–	Crystal Palace	13	(1)

International career^{‡}
2013	England U19	1	(0)
- * Club domestic league appearances and goals ‡ National team caps and goals as of 6 October 2018

Felicity "Fliss" Gibbons (born 9 July 1994) is a retired English football defender and striker who most recently played for Crystal Palace.

== Early life ==
Gibbons was born in Maidstone, England and began playing football at the age of eight. She played for her youth side the Castle Colts in Kent.

== Club career ==
Gibbons started her senior career at Charlton Athletic before moving on to Watford F.C. While at Watford she went on a four-month loan at Gillingham W.F.C. in the fall of 2013. She then moved onto her first spell at Brighton & Hove Albion for the 2014/2015 season. During this season she scored 10 goals in 17 appearances and won the club's Women's Player of the year. In 2016 Gibbons left the Seagulls for the Millwall Lionesses. She then returned to Gillingham L.F.C. for the 2016/2017 season. While at the Kent club she scored 33 goals in 19 appearances and won the FA WPL Division One South East Top Goal Scorer award. She then rejoined Albion in August 2017 ahead of the club's first-ever season in FA WSL2. Gibbons was utilized both as a striker and a defender as Brighton & Hove Albion moved up to England's top flight, the FA WSL, for the 2018–19 season.

Gibbons joined Crystal Palace in 2022, and was the league's top assist provider in the 2023-24 Women's Championship season as Crystal Palace earned promotion to the Women's Super League for their first time. Gibson retired from playing professionally at the end of the 2024-25 season, having made a total of 52 competitive appearances for Palace.

== International career ==
Gibbons was part of the England U19 team for the 2012–2013 period.
