= 2022–23 Brighton & Hove Albion W.F.C. season =

Brighton & Hove Albion
2022–23 season
- Chairman: Tony Bloom
- Manager: Hope Powell (until 31 October); Amy Merricks (interim, 31 October – 28 December); Jens Scheuer (28 December – 6 March); Amy Merricks (interim, 6 March – 7 April); Melissa Phillips (from 7 April)
- Stadium: Broadfield Stadium, Crawley
- Women's Super League: 11th
- FA Cup: Semi-final
- League Cup: Group Stage
- Top goalscorer: League: Elisabeth Terland (7); All: Danielle Carter (9)
- Highest home attendance: 5,220 vs Reading (Women's Super League – 25 September 2022)
- Lowest home attendance: 1,005 vs West Ham United (FA Women's League Cup – 18 January 2023)
- Average home league attendance: 3,427
| Home colours | Away colours | Third colours |
- All statistics correct as of 27 May 2023.

The 2022–23 Brighton & Hove Albion W.F.C. season was the club's 32nd season in existence and their fifth in the Women's Super League, the highest level of the football pyramid. Along with competing in the WSL, the club also contested two domestic cup competitions: the FA Cup and the League Cup.

On 31 October, Hope Powell stepped down as manager after five years in charge. Assistant manager Amy Merricks was promoted to interim manager. Jens Scheuer, who had been out of work since leaving Bayern Munich at the conclusion of the 2021–22 Frauen-Bundesliga season in May, was appointed to the role permanently on 28 December. He remained in the role for 65 days until leaving by mutual consent on 6 March 2023. Merricks was reappointed interim manager on the same day. With the team sat bottom of the WSL in 12th, Brighton appointed Melissa Phillips as head coach on a two-year contract on 7 April. Phillips left her role as assistant coach of Angel City FC, a role she had only held since January 2023 after stepping down as head coach of London City Lionesses, to take the job.

== Squad ==
As of 29 January 2023

Note: Flags indicate national team as defined under FIFA eligibility rules; some limited exceptions apply. Players may hold more than one non-FIFA nationality.

| No. | Pos. | Nation | Player |
|---|---|---|---|
| 1 | GK | IRL | Megan Walsh |
| 2 | DF | ENG | Jorja Fox (on loan from Chelsea) |
| 3 | DF | ENG | Poppy Pattinson |
| 4 | MF | USA | Brianna Visalli |
| 5 | DF | NOR | Guro Bergsvand |
| 6 | MF | SRB | Dejana Stefanović |
| 7 | MF | GRE | Veatriki Sarri |
| 8 | MF | IRL | Megan Connolly |
| 9 | FW | KOR | Lee Geum-min |
| 10 | FW | SWE | Julia Zigiotti Olme (on loan from BK Häcken) |
| 11 | FW | NOR | Elisabeth Terland |
| 12 | MF | ENG | Libby Bance |
| 13 | DF | NZL | Rebekah Stott |
| 14 | MF | KOR | Park Ye-eun |

| No. | Pos. | Nation | Player |
|---|---|---|---|
| 15 | MF | WAL | Kayleigh Green |
| 16 | DF | SWE | Emma Kullberg (on loan from BK Häcken) |
| 17 | MF | ENG | Maisie Symonds |
| 18 | FW | ENG | Danielle Carter |
| 20 | DF | ENG | Victoria Williams (captain) |
| 21 | DF | USA | Zoe Morse |
| 22 | MF | ENG | Katie Robinson |
| 23 | MF | ENG | Lulu Jarvis |
| 24 | MF | ENG | Chelsea Ferguson |
| 25 | GK | AUS | Lydia Williams |
| 40 | GK | ENG | Katie Startup |
| 51 | FW | ENG | Leah Lane |
| 55 | DF | ENG | Eilish Mitchell |

== Preseason ==
| 7 August 2022 Friendly | Bayern Munich (Germany) | 0–1 | Brighton & Hove Albion | Munich, Germany |
| | | Report | Robinson | Stadium: FC Bayern Campus; Attendance: Behind-closed-doors |

| 11 August 2022 Friendly | Manchester City | 3–1 | Brighton & Hove Albion | Manchester |
| | Aleixandri; Raso; Marley-Paraskevas | Report | Goal | Stadium: Academy Stadium; Attendance: Behind-closed-doors |

| 27 August 2022 Friendly | Leicester City | 1–2 | Brighton & Hove Albion | Leicester |
| | Howard | Report | Robinson; Connolly | Stadium: Belvoir Drive; Attendance: Behind-closed-doors |

== Competitions ==
=== Women's Super League ===
==== Results summary ====
| Overall | | | | | | | | Home | | | | | | Away | | | | | |
| Pld | W | D | L | GF | GA | GD | Pts | W | D | L | GF | GA | GD | W | D | L | GF | GA | GD |
|---|---|---|---|---|---|---|---|---|---|---|---|---|---|---|---|---|---|---|---|
| 22 | 4 | 4 | 14 | 26 | 63 | −37 | 16 | 3 | 1 | 7 | 12 | 33 | −21 | 1 | 3 | 7 | 14 | 30 | −16 |

Last updated: 27 May 2023.
Source: FA WSL

==== Results by matchday ====
| Round | 1 | 2 | 3 | 4 | 5 | 6 | 7 | 8 | 9 | 10 | 11 | 12 | 13 | 14 | 15 | 16 | 17 | 18 | 19 | 20 | 21 | 22 |
|---|---|---|---|---|---|---|---|---|---|---|---|---|---|---|---|---|---|---|---|---|---|---|
| Ground | A | H | A | H | H | A | H | A | A | A | H | A | H | A | H | H | A | A | H | H | A | H |
| Result | L | W | L | L | L | W | D | L | L | D | L | L | L | D | L | W | L | D | W | L | L | L |
| Position | 11 | 8 | 10 | 10 | 11 | 9 | 9 | 11 | 11 | 10 | 10 | 11 | 11 | 11 | 12 | 10 | 10 | 11 | 9 | 9 | 10 | 11 |

A = Away; H = Home; W = Win; D = Draw; L = Loss

==== Results ====
| 11 September 2022 | Brighton & Hove Albion | P–P | Aston Villa | Brighton and Hove |
| 14:00 | | | | Stadium: Falmer Stadium |
Note: The FA postponed all of the weekend's football fixtures following the death of Elizabeth II on 8 September 2022.

| 16 September 2022 1 | Arsenal | 4–0 | Brighton & Hove Albion | Borehamwood |
| 19:30 | Little 28'; Blackstenius 50'; Foord (yellow card) 59'; Mead 63', 83' | Report | Kullberg (red card) 7' | Stadium: Meadow Park; Attendance: 3,238; Referee: Lisa Benn |

| 25 September 2022 2 | Brighton & Hove Albion | 2–1 | Reading | Brighton and Hove |
| 14:00 | Zigiotti Olme (yellow card) 20'; Terland (yellow card) 36'; Lee 40'; Robinson 80' | Report | Caldwell (yellow card) 11'; Wellings 90+4' | Stadium: Falmer Stadium; Attendance: 5,220; Referee: Lauren Impey |

| 16 October 2022 3 | Manchester United | 4–0 | Brighton & Hove Albion | Leigh |
| 12:00 | Toone 14', 26'; Zelem (yellow card) 36'; Galton 40'; Leon 78' | Report | Green (yellow card) 39'; Williams (yellow card) 74' | Stadium: Leigh Sports Village; Attendance: 3,685; Referee: Emily Heaslip |

| 23 October 2022 4 | Brighton & Hove Albion | 0–2 | Chelsea | Crawley |
| 18:45 | Zigiotti Olme (yellow card) 86' | Report | England 58'; Harder 86' | Stadium: Broadfield Stadium; Attendance: 3,626; Referee: Abigail Byrne |

| 30 October 2022 5 | Brighton & Hove Albion | 0–8 | Tottenham Hotspur | Crawley |
| 14:00 | | Report | Bartrip 2'; Karczewska 19'; Neville 29', 56'; Spence 45+2', 58'; Naz 60', 83' | Stadium: Broadfield Stadium; Attendance: 2,514; Referee: Louise Saunders |

| 6 November 2022 6 | West Ham United | 4–5 | Brighton & Hove Albion | Dagenham |
| 15:00 | Evans 3'; Filis (yellow card) 53'; Stringer (yellow card) 61'; Williams 61' (o.g.); Asseyi 85', 86' | Report | Carter 8', 20' (pen.); Sarri 11'; Zigiotti Olme (yellow card) 45+3'; Green (yellow card) 59'; Terland 68'; Fox 71' | Stadium: Victoria Road; Attendance: 1,129; Referee: Emily Heaslip |

| 20 November 2022 7 | Brighton & Hove Albion | 3–3 | Liverpool | Crawley |
| 14:00 | Terland 21'; Carter 26' (pen.); Robinson 34' | Report | Bo Kearns 17'; Flaherty (yellow card) 53'; Matthews (yellow card) 56'; van de Sanden 76'; Wardlaw (yellow card) 87'; Furness 90+2' | Stadium: Broadfield Stadium; Attendance: 2,980; Referee: Abigail Byrne |

| 4 December 2022 8 | Manchester City | 3–1 | Brighton & Hove Albion | Manchester |
| 14:00 | Sarri 11' (o.g.); Blakstad 19'; Coombs 26'; Ouahabi (yellow card) 52'; Morgan (yellow card) 90+2' | Report | Sarri (yellow card) 33'; Lee 90+3' | Stadium: Academy Stadium; Attendance: 1,696; Referee: Cheryl Foster |

| 11 December 2022 | Brighton & Hove Albion | P–P | Everton | Crawley |
| 14:00 | | | | Stadium: Broadfield Stadium |
Note: Postponed due to frozen pitch.

| 15 January 2023 9 | Leicester City | 3–0 | Brighton & Hove Albion | Leicester |
| 15:00 | Whelan 45'; Tierney 48'; Robinson 69'; Baker (yellow card) 74' | Report | | Stadium: King Power Stadium; Attendance: 2,329; Referee: Cheryl Foster |

| 22 January 2023 | Brighton & Hove Albion | P–P | Arsenal | Crawley |
| 18:45 | | | | Stadium: Broadfield Stadium |
Note: Postponed due to frozen pitch.

| 4 February 2023 10 | Aston Villa | 1–1 | Brighton & Hove Albion | Walsall |
| 12:30 | Green 33' (o.g.); Mayling (yellow card) 90+2' | Report | Zigiotti Olme 74'; Kullberg (yellow card) 90+1' | Stadium: Bescot Stadium; Attendance: 1,365; Referee: Louise Saunders |

| 12 February 2023 11 | Brighton & Hove Albion | 2–6 | Aston Villa | Crawley |
| 14:00 | Zigiotti Olme 3'; Carter 49' (pen.) | Report | Staniforth 15'; Hanson 17'; Nobbs 23', 43', 69'; Daly 36'; Mayling (yellow card) 80' | Stadium: Broadfield Stadium; Attendance: 2,593; Referee: Elizabeth Simms |
Note: Rescheduled from 11 September 2022 and moved from Falmer Stadium.

| 8 March 2023 12 | Chelsea | 3–1 | Brighton & Hove Albion | Kingston upon Thames |
| 19:30 | Reiten 12' (pen.); J. Carter 21'; Rytting Kaneryd 71' | Report | Sarri (yellow card) 68'; D. Carter 88' | Stadium: Kingsmeadow; Attendance: 916; Referee: Abigail Byrne |

| 12 March 2023 13 | Brighton & Hove Albion | 1–2 | Manchester City | Crawley |
| 14:00 | Terland 33' | Report | Shaw 21', 89' | Stadium: Broadfield Stadium; Attendance: 3,500; Referee: Yoshimi Yamashita |

| 26 March 2023 14 | Reading | 2–2 | Brighton & Hove Albion | Reading |
| 14:00 | Harries 46', 60', (yellow card) 86' | Report | Sarri 8', 13'; D. Carter (yellow card) 90+2' | Stadium: Madejski Stadium; Attendance: 970; Referee: Robert Madley |

| 1 April 2023 15 | Brighton & Hove Albion | 0–4 | Manchester United | Crawley |
| 11:30 | Zigiotti Olme (yellow card) 40'; Pattinson (yellow card) 52' | Report | Galton 12', 66'; Williams 86'; García 87' | Stadium: Broadfield Stadium; Attendance: 4,375; Referee: Stacey Fullicks |

| 19 April 2023 16 | Brighton & Hove Albion | 3–2 | Everton | Crawley |
| 19:00 | Terland 12', 80'; Kullberg (yellow card) 41'; Robinson 43'; Carter (yellow card) 83'; Pattinson (yellow card) 90+5' | Report | Snoeijs 63', 83' | Stadium: Broadfield Stadium; Attendance: 2,456; Referee: Lauren Impey |
Note: Rescheduled from 11 December 2022.

| 23 April 2023 17 | Liverpool | 2–1 | Brighton & Hove Albion | Birkenhead |
| 14:00 | Holland 54', 70'; Lawley (yellow card) 74' | Report | Terland 39'; Green (yellow card) 90+3' | Stadium: Prenton Park; Attendance: 1,888; Referee: Lisa Benn |

| 29 April 2023 18 | Tottenham Hotspur | 2–2 | Brighton & Hove Albion | Tottenham |
| 17:15 | England 12', 78' | Report | Terland 10', (yellow card) 68'; Lee (yellow card) 63', (goal) 65' | Stadium: Tottenham Hotspur Stadium; Attendance: 4,194; Referee: Cheryl Foster |

| 7 May 2023 19 | Brighton & Hove Albion | 1–0 | West Ham United | Crawley |
| 14:00 | Connolly (yellow card) 5'; Green 57'; Terland (yellow card) 69' | Report | Parker (yellow card) 88' | Stadium: Broadfield Stadium; Attendance: 2,952; Referee: Amy Fearn |

| 10 May 2023 20 | Brighton & Hove Albion | 0–4 | Arsenal | Crawley |
| 19:30 | | Report | Blackstenius 6', 8'; Maanum 39'; Pelova 45' | Stadium: Broadfield Stadium; Attendance: 4,411; Referee: Kirsty Dowle |
Note: Rescheduled from 22 January 2023.

| 21 May 2023 21 | Everton | 2–1 | Brighton & Hove Albion | Liverpool |
| 13:00 | Snoeijs 32'; Bennison 90+1' | Report | Sarri (yellow card) 44'; Robinson 45+1'; Connolly (yellow card) 89' | Stadium: Walton Hall Park; Attendance: 670; Referee: Lauren Impey |

| 27 May 2023 22 | Brighton & Hove Albion | 0–1 | Leicester City | Crawley |
| 14:30 | Lee (yellow card) 31'; Symonds (yellow card) 64' | Report | Bott (yellow card) 27'; Baker 73' | Stadium: Broadfield Stadium; Attendance: 3,073; Referee: Abigail Byrne |

==== League table ====
| Pos | Team | Pld | W | D | L | GF | GA | GD | Pts | Qualification or relegation |
|---|---|---|---|---|---|---|---|---|---|---|
| 8 | West Ham United | 22 | 6 | 3 | 13 | 23 | 44 | −21 | 21 | |
| 9 | Tottenham Hotspur | 22 | 5 | 3 | 14 | 31 | 47 | −16 | 18 | |
| 10 | Leicester City | 22 | 5 | 1 | 16 | 15 | 48 | −33 | 16 | |
| 11 | Brighton & Hove Albion | 22 | 4 | 4 | 14 | 26 | 63 | −37 | 16 | |
| 12 | Reading (R) | 22 | 3 | 2 | 17 | 23 | 57 | −34 | 11 | Relegation to the Championship |

Source: Women's Super League
Rules for classification: 1) Points; 2) Goal difference; 3) Number of goals scored.
(R) Relegated

=== Women's FA Cup ===
As a member of the first tier, Brighton will enter the FA Cup in the fourth round proper. In the Fifth round a home tie against Coventry United was confirmed.

| 29 January 2023 Fourth round | West Bromwich Albion | 0–7 | Brighton & Hove Albion | Hednesford |
| 14:00 GMT | | Report | Stott 6'; Zigiotti Olme 19', 40'; Carter 56'; Robinson 60'; Visalli 66'; Fox 90+2' | Stadium: Keys Park; Attendance: 219; Referee: Grace Lowe |

| 26 February 2023 Fifth round | Brighton & Hove Albion | 5–0 | Coventry United | Crawley |
| 14:00 GMT | Visalli 17', 78'; Lee 88', 90+3'; Orthodoxou 90+1' (o.g.) | Report | | Stadium: Broadfield Stadium; Attendance: 848; Referee: Stacey Fullicks |

| 19 March 2023 Quarter-finals | Birmingham City | 0–2 | Brighton & Hove Albion | Birmingham |
| 14:00 GMT | Scott (yellow card) 79' | Report | Pattinson 28'; Carter 32' (pen.) | Stadium: St Andrew's; Attendance: 541; Referee: Emily Heaslip |

| 15 April 2023 Semi-finals | Manchester United | 3–2 | Brighton & Hove Albion | Leigh |
| 17:15 | Galton 46'; Ladd (yellow card) 56'; Le Tissier (yellow card) 65'; Russo 71'; Williams 89' | Report | Earps 36' (o.g.); Robinson (yellow card) 45+1'; Sarri (yellow card) 48'; Carter 75'; Zigiotti Olme (yellow card) 88' | Stadium: Leigh Sports Village; Attendance: 4,096; Referee: Kirsty Dowle |

=== Group stage ===
| 2 October 2022 Group stage | Birmingham City | 3–2 | Brighton & Hove Albion | Birmingham |
| 14:00 | Smith 25'; Pennock 53'; Lu. Quinn 62'; Murray (yellow card) 90+4' | Report | Pattinson (yellow card) 46'; Lee 59'; Carter 89' (pen.) | Stadium: St Andrew's; Referee: Richie Watkins |

| 27 November 2022 Group stage | London City Lionesses | 1–2 | Brighton & Hove Albion | Dartford |
| 14:00 | Agg (yellow card) 47'; Muya 53'; Nolan (yellow card) 75' | Report | Terland 35'; V. Williams 65' | Stadium: Princes Park |

| 17 December 2022 Group stage | Brighton & Hove Albion | P–P | West Ham United | Crawley |
| 12:00 | | | | Stadium: Broadfield Stadium |
Note: Postponed due to frozen pitch.

| 18 January 2023 Group stage | Brighton & Hove Albion | 0–0 (3–0 p) | West Ham United | Crawley |
| 19:30 | Morse (yellow card) 14' | Report | Asseyi (yellow card) 35'; Longhurst (yellow card) 60' | Stadium: Broadfield Stadium; Attendance: 1,005; Referee: Kirsty Dowle |
| | Penalties |
| | Symonds (penalty scored); V. Williams (penalty scored); Fox (penalty scored) | | (penalty missed) Filis; (penalty missed) Fisk; (penalty missed) Houssein |
Note: Rescheduled from 17 December 2022.

| Pos | Team | Pld | W | WPEN | LPEN | L | GF | GA | GD | Pts | Qualification | WHU | BHA | LCL | BIR |
|---|---|---|---|---|---|---|---|---|---|---|---|---|---|---|---|
| 1 | West Ham United | 3 | 1 | 1 | 1 | 0 | 4 | 2 | +2 | 6 | Advanced to knock-out stage | — | – | – | 2–0 |
| 2 | Brighton & Hove Albion | 3 | 1 | 1 | 0 | 1 | 4 | 4 | 0 | 5 | Possible knock-out stage based on ranking | 0–0 | — | – | – |
| 3 | London City Lionesses | 3 | 1 | 0 | 1 | 1 | 5 | 5 | 0 | 4 | | 2–2 | 1–2 | — | – |
| 4 | Birmingham City | 3 | 1 | 0 | 0 | 2 | 4 | 6 | −2 | 3 | | – | 3–2 | 1–2 | — |

Rules for classification: 1) Points; 2) Goal difference; 3) Number of goals scored; 4) Number of wins; 5) Head-to-head record

| Pos | Grp | Team | Pld | W | WPEN | LPEN | L | GF | GA | GD | Pts | PPG | Qualification |
|---|---|---|---|---|---|---|---|---|---|---|---|---|---|
| 1 | B | Liverpool | 4 | 3 | 0 | 0 | 1 | 6 | 2 | +4 | 9 | 2.25 | Advanced to knock-out stage |
| 2 | A | Manchester United | 4 | 2 | 0 | 2 | 0 | 11 | 5 | +6 | 8 | 2.00 | |
| 3 | E | Reading | 3 | 2 | 0 | 0 | 1 | 8 | 2 | +6 | 6 | 2.00 | |
| 4 | C | Brighton & Hove Albion | 3 | 2 | 0 | 0 | 1 | 6 | 2 | +4 | 6 | 2.00 | |
| 5 | D | Lewes | 3 | 2 | 0 | 0 | 1 | 6 | 2 | +4 | 6 | 2.00 | |

== Squad statistics ==
=== Appearances ===
As of 27 May 2023

Starting appearances are listed first, followed by substitute appearances after the + symbol where applicable.

| No. | Pos | Nat | Player | Total | | WSL | | FA Cup | | League Cup | |
| No. | Pos | Nat | Player | Apps | Goals | Apps | Goals | Apps | Goals | Apps | Goals |
Goalkeepers
| 1 | GK | (Republic of Ireland) IRL | Megan Walsh | 20 | 0 | 15 | 0 | 2 | 0 | 3 | 0 |
| 25 | GK | (Australia) AUS | Lydia Williams | 9 | 0 | 7 | 0 | 2 | 0 | 0 | 0 |
| 40 | GK | (England) ENG | Katie Startup | 0 | 0 | 0 | 0 | 0 | 0 | 0 | 0 |
Defenders
| 2 | DF | (England) ENG | Jorja Fox | 23 | 2 | 13+4 | 1 | 3 | 1 | 3 | 0 |
| 3 | DF | (England) ENG | Poppy Pattinson | 27 | 1 | 17+3 | 0 | 4 | 1 | 2+1 | 0 |
| 5 | DF | (Norway) NOR | Guro Bergsvand | 14 | 0 | 9+1 | 0 | 3 | 0 | 1 | 0 |
| 13 | DF | (New Zealand) NZL | Rebekah Stott | 6 | 1 | 4+1 | 0 | 1 | 1 | 0 | 0 |
| 16 | DF | (Sweden) SWE | Emma Kullberg | 24 | 0 | 19+1 | 0 | 2 | 0 | 1+1 | 0 |
| 20 | DF | (England) ENG | Victoria Williams | 14 | 1 | 9+1 | 0 | 1 | 0 | 3 | 1 |
| 21 | DF | (United States) USA | Zoe Morse | 19 | 0 | 14 | 0 | 3+1 | 0 | 1 | 0 |
| 55 | DF | (England) ENG | Eilish Mitchell | 0 | 0 | 0 | 0 | 0 | 0 | 0 | 0 |
Midfielders
| 4 | MF | (United States) USA | Brianna Visalli | 15 | 3 | 1+9 | 0 | 2+2 | 3 | 1 | 0 |
| 6 | MF | (Serbia) SRB | Dejana Stefanović | 6 | 0 | 2+4 | 0 | 0 | 0 | 0 | 0 |
| 7 | MF | (Greece) GRE | Veatriki Sarri | 26 | 3 | 16+6 | 3 | 1+1 | 0 | 2 | 0 |
| 8 | MF | (Republic of Ireland) IRL | Megan Connolly | 17 | 0 | 12+1 | 0 | 1+2 | 0 | 1 | 0 |
| 12 | MF | (England) ENG | Libby Bance | 24 | 0 | 8+9 | 0 | 3+1 | 0 | 2+1 | 0 |
| 14 | MF | (South Korea) KOR | Park Ye-eun | 7 | 0 | 0+4 | 0 | 0 | 0 | 3 | 0 |
| 15 | MF | (Wales) WAL | Kayleigh Green | 25 | 1 | 13+6 | 1 | 0+3 | 0 | 3 | 0 |
| 17 | MF | (England) ENG | Maisie Symonds | 5 | 0 | 1+3 | 0 | 0 | 0 | 0+1 | 0 |
| 22 | MF | (England) ENG | Katie Robinson | 29 | 5 | 21+1 | 4 | 4 | 1 | 2+1 | 0 |
| 23 | MF | (England) ENG | Lulu Jarvis | 2 | 0 | 0+1 | 0 | 0+1 | 0 | 0 | 0 |
| 24 | MF | (England) ENG | Chelsea Ferguson | 2 | 0 | 0+2 | 0 | 0 | 0 | 0 | 0 |
Forwards
| 9 | FW | (South Korea) KOR | Lee Geum-min | 27 | 6 | 19+2 | 3 | 2+1 | 2 | 2+1 | 1 |
| 10 | FW | (Sweden) SWE | Julia Zigiotti Olme | 27 | 4 | 19+1 | 2 | 4 | 2 | 1+2 | 0 |
| 11 | FW | (Norway) NOR | Elisabeth Terland | 22 | 8 | 16+1 | 7 | 3 | 0 | 1+1 | 1 |
| 18 | FW | (England) ENG | Danielle Carter | 26 | 9 | 7+13 | 5 | 3+1 | 3 | 1+1 | 1 |
| 51 | FW | (England) ENG | Leah Lane | 0 | 0 | 0 | 0 | 0 | 0 | 0 | 0 |

=== Goalscorers ===
As of 27 May 2023

| Rnk | No | Pos | Nat | Name | WSL | FA Cup | League Cup | Total |
|---|---|---|---|---|---|---|---|---|
| 1 | 18 | FW | (England) | Danielle Carter | 5 | 3 | 1 | 9 |
| 2 | 11 | FW | (Norway) | Elisabeth Terland | 7 | 0 | 1 | 8 |
| 3 | 9 | FW | (South Korea) | Lee Geum-min | 3 | 2 | 1 | 6 |
| 4 | 22 | MF | (England) | Katie Robinson | 4 | 1 | 0 | 5 |
| 5 | 10 | FW | (Sweden) | Julia Zigiotti Olme | 2 | 2 | 0 | 4 |
| 6 | 7 | MF | (Greece) | Veatriki Sarri | 3 | 0 | 0 | 3 |
| 6 | 4 | MF | (United States) | Brianna Visalli | 0 | 3 | 0 | 3 |
| 8 | 2 | DF | (England) | Jorja Fox | 1 | 1 | 0 | 2 |
| 9 | 15 | MF | (Wales) | Kayleigh Green | 1 | 0 | 0 | 1 |
| 9 | 3 | DF | (England) | Poppy Pattinson | 0 | 1 | 0 | 1 |
| 9 | 13 | DF | (New Zealand) | Rebekah Stott | 0 | 1 | 0 | 1 |
| 9 | 20 | DF | (England) | Victoria Williams | 0 | 0 | 1 | 1 |
| Own goals | | | | | 0 | 2 | 0 | 2 |
| Total | | | | | 25 | 16 | 4 | 45 |

== Transfers ==
=== Transfers in ===
| Date | Position | Nationality | Name | From | Ref. |
|---|---|---|---|---|---|
| 13 July 2022 | DF | (England) | Poppy Pattinson | (England) Everton | |
| 15 July 2022 | MF | (Greece) | Veatriki Sarri | (England) Birmingham City | |
| 20 July 2022 | DF | (New Zealand) | Rebekah Stott | (Australia) Melbourne City | |
| 1 August 2022 | MF | (South Korea) | Park Ye-eun | (South Korea) Gyeongju KHNP | |
| 1 August 2022 | FW | (Norway) | Elisabeth Terland | (Norway) SK Brann | |
| 5 January 2023 | DF | (Norway) | Guro Bergsvand | (Norway) SK Brann | |
| 6 January 2023 | MF | (Serbia) | Dejana Stefanović | (Norway) Vålerenga | |
| 7 January 2023 | MF | (United States) | Brianna Visalli | (United States) Houston Dash | |
| 8 January 2023 | DF | (United States) | Zoe Morse | (United States) Chicago Red Stars | |
| 19 January 2023 | GK | (Australia) | Lydia Williams | (France) Paris Saint-Germain | |

=== Loans in ===
| Date | Position | Nationality | Name | From | Until | Ref. |
|---|---|---|---|---|---|---|
| 23 August 2022 | DF | (England) | Jorja Fox | (England) Chelsea | End of season | |

=== Transfers out ===
| Date | Position | Nationality | Name | To | Ref. |
|---|---|---|---|---|---|
| 10 May 2022 | MF | (Netherlands) | Inessa Kaagman | (Netherlands) PSV Eindhoven | |
| 12 May 2022 | DF | (Netherlands) | Danique Kerkdijk | (Netherlands) FC Twente | |
| 12 May 2022 | FW | (England) | Aileen Whelan | (England) Leicester City | |
| 12 May 2022 | DF | (England) | Felicity Gibbons | (England) Crystal Palace | |
| 12 May 2022 | MF | (England) | Danielle Bowman | Retired | |
| 12 May 2022 | MF | (England) | Emily Simpkins | (England) Charlton Athletic | |
| 1 July 2022 | DF | (Finland) | Emma Koivisto | (England) Liverpool | |
| 1 July 2022 | FW | (England) | Ellie Brazil | (England) Tottenham Hotspur | |
| 20 July 2022 | DF | (England) | Maya Le Tissier | (England) Manchester United | |
| 5 August 2022 | FW | (England) | Faith Nokuthula | (England) Blackburn Rovers | |
| 9 August 2022 | DF | (Belgium) | Léa Cordier | (Belgium) Standard Liège | |

=== Loans out ===
| Date | Position | Nationality | Name | To | Until | Ref. |
|---|---|---|---|---|---|---|
| 20 August 2022 | GK | (England) | Francis Angel (Note: Dual registration) | (England) Lewes | End of season | |
