= List of English women's football transfers summer 2023 =

The 2023 English women's football summer transfer window ran from 26 June to 14 September 2023. Players without a club could be signed at any time, clubs could sign players on loan dependent on their league's regulations, and clubs could sign a goalkeeper on an emergency loan if they had no registered senior goalkeeper available. This list includes transfers featuring at least one club from either the Women's Super League or the Women's Championship that were completed after the end of the winter 2022–23 transfer window on 2 February and before the end of the 2023 summer window.

== Transfers ==
All players and clubs without a flag are English.

Date	Name	Moving from	Moving to	Ref.
3 March 2023	(Wales) Helen Ward	Watford	Retired	
6 March 2023	(Belgium) Nicky Evrard	(Belgium) OH Leuven	Chelsea	
29 March 2023	(Germany) Leonie Maier	Everton	(Germany) 1899 Hoffenheim	
26 April 2023	(United States) Shae Yanez	London City Lionesses	(United States) San Diego Wave	
30 April 2023	Abbey Joice	Sunderland	Retired	
1 May 2023	(Wales) Chloe Bull	Bristol City	Unattached	
1 May 2023	Lily Greenslade	Bristol City	Unattached	
2 May 2023	(Wales) Esther Morgan	Sunderland	Tottenham Hotspur (end of loan)	
3 May 2023	Evie Rabjohn	Aston Villa	Manchester United	
4 May 2023	Evie Smith	Liverpool Feds	Blackburn Rovers (end of loan)	
11 May 2023	Jorja Fox	Brighton & Hove Albion	Chelsea (end of loan)	
11 May 2023	(Republic of Ireland) Eleanor Ryan-Doyle	Coventry United	Birmingham City (end of loan)	
11 May 2023	Lily Simkin	Birmingham City	Unattached	
11 May 2023	Mollie Green	Coventry United	Birmingham City (end of loan)	
11 May 2023	Mollie Green	Birmingham City	Unattached	
11 May 2023	Ashley Hodson	Birmingham City	Liverpool (end of loan)	
11 May 2023	Charlie Devlin	Birmingham City	Leicester City (end of loan)	
11 May 2023	Olivia McLoughlin	Birmingham City	Aston Villa (end of loan)	
11 May 2023	Tara Bourne	Birmingham City	Manchester United (end of loan)	
12 May 2023	Jess Park	Everton	Manchester City (end of loan)	
12 May 2023	Elysia Boddy	Bristol City	Unattached	
16 May 2023	(Germany) Sjoeke Nüsken	(Germany) Eintracht Frankfurt	Chelsea	
16 May 2023	Georgie Freeland	Southampton	Unattached	
16 May 2023	Phoebe Williams	Southampton	Unattached	
16 May 2023	Ella Pusey	Southampton	Unattached	
16 May 2023	Beth Lumsden	Southampton	Unattached	
16 May 2023	Ella Hunkin	Southampton	Unattached	
16 May 2023	Chloe Peplow	Southampton	Reading (end of loan)	
18 May 2023	(Sweden) Magdalena Eriksson	Chelsea	Unattached	
18 May 2023	(Denmark) Pernille Harder	Chelsea	Unattached	
18 May 2023	(Australia) Isobel Dalton	Lewes	Unattached	
22 May 2023	(Denmark) Camilla Kur Larsen	Blackburn Rovers	Retired	
23 May 2023	(Canada) Rylee Foster	Liverpool	Unattached	
24 May 2023	(Denmark) Rikke Sevecke	Everton	Unattached	
25 May 2023	(Jamaica) Victoria Williams	Brighton & Hove Albion	Unattached	
25 May 2023	Izzy Christiansen	Everton	Retired	
25 May 2023	Charlotte Clarke	West Bromwich Albion	Liverpool (end of loan)	
25 May 2023	Leighanne Robe	Liverpool	Unattached	
25 May 2023	(Wales) Rhiannon Roberts	Liverpool	Unattached	
26 May 2023	(Australia) Emily Gielnik	Aston Villa	Unattached	
26 May 2023	(Wales) Natasha Harding	Aston Villa	Unattached	
27 May 2023	(Netherlands) Aniek Nouwen	(Italy) Milan	Chelsea (end of loan)	
27 May 2023	(Brazil) Rafaelle	Arsenal	Unattached	
28 May 2023	(Australia) Hayley Raso	Manchester City	Unattached	
30 May 2023	Lauren Bruton	Charlton Athletic	Retired	
1 June 2023	Elisha N'Dow	Charlton Athletic	Aston Villa (end of loan)	
1 June 2023	Sian Rogers	Charlton Athletic	Aston Villa (end of loan)	
1 June 2023	Adekite Fatuga-Dada	Watford	Unattached	
1 June 2023	Emily Wallace	Watford	Unattached	
1 June 2023	(Japan) Faye Brough	Watford	Unattached	
1 June 2023	Nicola Gibson	Watford	Unattached	
2 June 2023	Kerys Harrop	Tottenham Hotspur	Unattached	
2 June 2023	(Australia) Kyah Simon	Tottenham Hotspur	Unattached	
2 June 2023	Chioma Ubogagu	Tottenham Hotspur	Unattached	
2 June 2023	(Wales) Esther Morgan	Tottenham Hotspur	Unattached	
2 June 2023	(Japan) Mana Iwabuchi	Tottenham Hotspur	Arsenal (end of loan)	
6 June 2023	Sophie Barker	Sheffield United	Leicester City (end of loan)	
6 June 2023	Natasha Flint	(Scotland) Celtic	Leicester City (end of loan)	
6 June 2023	Sophie Barker	Leicester City	Unattached	
6 June 2023	Kirstie Levell	Leicester City	Unattached	
6 June 2023	Lachante Paul	Leicester City	Unattached	
6 June 2023	Abbie McManus	Leicester City	Unattached	
6 June 2023	Georgia Eaton-Collins	Leicester City	Unattached	
9 June 2023	(Finland) Tinja-Riikka Korpela	Tottenham Hotspur	Unattached	
9 June 2023	(United States) Catarina Macario	(France) Lyon	Chelsea	
9 June 2023	Alex Hennessy	Charlton Athletic	Unattached	
9 June 2023	Corinne Henson	Charlton Athletic	Unattached	
9 June 2023	Emma Follis	Charlton Athletic	Unattached	
9 June 2023	Ellie Wilson	Sheffield United	Unattached	
9 June 2023	Nina Wilson	Sheffield United	Unattached	
9 June 2023	Naomi Hartley	Sheffield United	Unattached	
9 June 2023	(Wales) Maria Francis-Jones	Sheffield United	Manchester City (end of dual-registration)	
13 June 2023	Fran Stenson	Sheffield United	Arsenal (end of loan)	
13 June 2023	(Wales) Ellie Leek	Blackburn Rovers	Unattached	
14 June 2023	(Japan) Mana Iwabuchi	Arsenal	Unattached	
16 June 2023	(Netherlands) Daphne van Domselaar	(Netherlands) Twente	Aston Villa	
19 June 2023	(Spain) Ona Batlle	Manchester United	(Spain) Barcelona	
19 June 2023	(Germany) Pauline Bremer	(Germany) VfL Wolfsburg	Brighton & Hove Albion	
20 June 2023	Meaghan Sargeant	Aston Villa	Retired	
21 June 2023	Emily Wilson-White	Crystal Palace	Unattached	
23 June 2023	Paula Howells	Lewes	Unattached	
23 June 2023	(Spain) Alejandra Bernabé	(Spain) Atlético Madrid	Chelsea	
27 June 2023	(Sweden) Amanda Ilestedt	(France) Paris Saint-Germain	Arsenal	
27 June 2023	(Wales) Chloe Williams	Manchester United	Blackburn Rovers	
28 June 2023	Lizzie Waldie	Crystal Palace	Unattached	
29 June 2023	(Northern Ireland) Caragh Hamilton	(Northern Ireland) Glentoran	Lewes	
29 June 2023	(Canada) Cloé Lacasse	(Portugal) Benfica	Arsenal	
29 June 2023	Brooke Cairns	West Ham United	Unattached	
29 June 2023	(Denmark) Amalie Thestrup	West Ham United	(Netherlands) PSV (end of loan)	
29 June 2023	Natasha Dowie	Liverpool	Reading (end of loan)	
29 June 2023	Becky Jane	Reading	Unattached	
29 June 2023	(Norway) Amalie Eikeland	Reading	Unattached	
29 June 2023	Faye Bryson	Reading	Unattached	
29 June 2023	Natasha Dowie	Reading	Unattached	
29 June 2023	Hannah Poulter	Reading	Unattached	
29 June 2023	Anna Grey	Ipswich Town	Lewes	
29 June 2023	(Malta) Maria Farrugia	Durham	Lewes	
29 June 2023	Rio Hardy	Durham	Unattached	
29 June 2023	Bridget Galloway	Durham	Unattached	
29 June 2023	Hannah Greenwood	Durham	Unattached	
30 June 2023	Jade Moore	Reading	Manchester United (end of loan)	
30 June 2023	(France) Estelle Cascarino	Manchester United	(France) Paris Saint-Germain (end of loan)	
30 June 2023	(France) Aïssatou Tounkara	Manchester United	Unattached	
30 June 2023	(Canada) Ashley Lawrence	(France) Paris Saint-Germain	Chelsea	
3 July 2023	(Scotland) Carly Girasoli	London City Lionesses	Unattached	
3 July 2023	Anna Pedersen	London City Lionesses	Unattached	
3 July 2023	Courtney Sweetman-Kirk	Sheffield United	Unattached	
3 July 2023	Alethea Paul	Sheffield United	Unattached	
3 July 2023	Rhema Lord-Mears	Sheffield United	Unattached	
3 July 2023	(Northern Ireland) Ellie Mason	Lewes	Birmingham City	
3 July 2023	Amy Rodgers	London City Lionesses	Bristol City	
3 July 2023	Amber-Keegan Stobbs	Lewes	Unattached	
4 July 2023	Alessia Russo	Manchester United	Arsenal	
4 July 2023	(Republic of Ireland) Eleanor Ryan-Doyle	Birmingham City	Durham	
4 July 2023	Hannah Hampton	Aston Villa	Chelsea	
4 July 2023	(Scotland) Kenzie Weir	Everton	(Scotland) Glasgow City (loan)	
4 July 2023	Mary McAteer	Coventry United	Sunderland	
5 July 2023	(Italy) Martina Piemonte	(Italy) Milan	Everton	
5 July 2023	(United States) Katie Stengel	Liverpool	(United States) NJ/NY Gotham (loan)	
5 July 2023	Charlie Devlin	Leicester City	Birmingham City	
5 July 2023	Natasha Flint	Leicester City	Liverpool	
6 July 2023	(Netherlands) Jill Roord	(Germany) VfL Wolfsburg	Manchester City	
6 July 2023	Lucy Parker	West Ham United	Aston Villa	
6 July 2023	(Wales) Gemma Evans	Reading	Manchester United	
6 July 2023	Katie Kitching	London City Lionesses	Sunderland	
7 July 2023	Brooke Aspin	Bristol City	Chelsea	
7 July 2023	Brooke Aspin	Chelsea	Bristol City (loan)	
7 July 2023	Lucy Jones	Birmingham City	West Bromwich Albion (dual registration)	
7 July 2023	Sarah Brasero-Carreira	Ipswich Town	Lewes	
7 July 2023	Chloe Peplow	Reading	Southampton	
7 July 2023	(United States) Erin Simon	Leicester City	Retired	
7 July 2023	Abby Towers	Sunderland	Middlesbrough	
8 July 2023	Danielle Brown	Sunderland	Unattached	
8 July 2023	(Switzerland) Luana Bühler	(Germany) 1899 Hoffenheim	Tottenham Hotspur	
10 July 2023	(Scotland) Jenna Clark	(Scotland) Glasgow City	Liverpool	
10 July 2023	(Germany) Lena Petermann	(France) Montpellier	Leicester City	
10 July 2023	Emma Kelly	Sunderland	Unattached	
10 July 2023	Brenna McPartlan	Sunderland	Unattached	
10 July 2023	Nicki Gears	Sunderland	Unattached	
10 July 2023	Tyler Dodds	Sunderland	Unattached	
10 July 2023	(United States) Allison Cowling	Sunderland	Unattached	
10 July 2023	Kate Longhurst	West Ham United	Charlton Athletic	
11 July 2023	(Belgium) Janice Cayman	(France) Lyon	Leicester City	
11 July 2023	Anna Patten	Aston Villa	Arsenal (end of loan)	
11 July 2023	Anna Patten	Arsenal	Aston Villa	
12 July 2023	Sian Rogers	Aston Villa	Charlton Athletic	
12 July 2023	Saffron Jordan	Blackburn Rovers	Retired	
12 July 2023	Amy Andrews	(United States) Western Illinois Leathernecks	Durham	
13 July 2023	Mia Enderby	Sheffield United	Liverpool	
13 July 2023	(Nigeria) Ashleigh Plumptre	Leicester City	Unattached	
13 July 2023	Rianna Dean	Crystal Palace	Southampton	
13 July 2023	Hollie Olding	Crystal Palace	Lewes	
14 July 2023	(Republic of Ireland) Emily Kraft	Lewes	Southampton	
14 July 2023	Lia Cataldo	Bristol City	Crystal Palace	
16 July 2023	(Spain) Vicky Losada	Unattached	Brighton & Hove Albion	
17 July 2023	(United States) Madison Haley	(Australia) Sydney FC	Brighton & Hove Albion	
17 July 2023	(Australia) Teagan Micah	(Sweden) Rosengård	Liverpool	
18 July 2023	Natasha Fenton	Blackburn Rovers	Sunderland	
19 July 2023	(Wales) Kayleigh Green	Brighton & Hove Albion	Charlton Athletic	
19 July 2023	Reanna Blades	Chelsea	Lewes (loan)	
19 July 2023	Charlotte Clarke	Liverpool	Birmingham City	
20 July 2023	Grace Riglar	Sheffield United	Lewes	
20 July 2023	Grace Fisk	West Ham United	Liverpool	
20 July 2023	Harley Bennett	London City Lionesses	Watford	
20 July 2023	Grace Garrad	(Norway) Stabæk	Lewes	
20 July 2023	Connie Scofield	Leicester City	London City Lionesses	
20 July 2023	Katie Dungate	Chelsea	Birmingham City	
20 July 2023	Molly Pike	Leicester City	Southampton	
20 July 2023	Elisha N'Dow	Aston Villa	Charlton Athletic	
21 July 2023	Sophie Hillyerd	West Ham United	London City Lionesses	
21 July 2023	(Wales) Rachel Rowe	Reading	(Scotland) Rangers	
21 July 2023	Jessica Sigsworth	Leicester City	Sheffield United	
21 July 2023	(Australia) Mackenzie Hawkesby	(Australia) Sydney FC	Brighton & Hove Albion	
22 July 2023	Isobel Goodwin	Coventry United	Sheffield United	
23 July 2023	Ashley Hodson	Liverpool	Sheffield United	
23 July 2023	Remi Allen	Aston Villa	Birmingham City	
24 July 2023	Jenna Dear	(France) Dijon	Sunderland	
25 July 2023	Coral-Jade Haines	Crystal Palace	Watford	
25 July 2023	Jemma Purfield	Leicester City	Southampton	
26 July 2023	Neve Herron	Sunderland	Birmingham City	
26 July 2023	(Australia) Charlize Rule	(Australia) Sydney FC	Brighton & Hove Albion	
26 July 2023	Jodie Hutton	Bristol City	Sheffield United	
26 July 2023	Amy Goddard	Oxford United	Sunderland	
27 July 2023	(Wales) Poppy Soper	Charlton Athletic	Ipswich Town (loan)	
27 July 2023	Ella Kinzett	Manchester United	Sheffield United	
28 July 2023	(Republic of Ireland) Jessie Stapleton	(Republic of Ireland) Shelbourne	West Ham United	
28 July 2023	Freya Godfrey	Arsenal	Charlton Athletic (loan)	
28 July 2023	(Scotland) Sarah Ewens	London City Lionesses	(Scotland) Rangers	
28 July 2023	(Wales) Charlie Estcourt	Birmingham City	Reading	
28 July 2023	Fran Stenson	Arsenal	Sheffield United	
28 July 2023	Faye Kirby	Liverpool	(Scotland) Aberdeen (loan)	
29 July 2023	Emily Ramsey	Manchester United	Everton	
29 July 2023	(Republic of Ireland) Hayley Nolan	London City Lionesses	Crystal Palace	
30 July 2023	Shanade Hopcroft	London City Lionesses	Crystal Palace	
30 July 2023	Maddi Wilde	Bristol City	London City Lionesses (loan)	
31 July 2023	(Northern Ireland) Rebecca McKenna	Lewes	Charlton Athletic	
31 July 2023	(Austria) Marie Höbinger	(Switzerland) Zürich	Liverpool	
31 July 2023	Ava Kuyken	(Scotland) Hibernian	Reading	
1 August 2023	Ellen Jones	Leicester City	Sunderland	
1 August 2023	Aimee Palmer	Bristol City	Leicester City	
1 August 2023	(Wales) Olivia Clark	Bristol City	Watford (loan)	
2 August 2023	Emma Harries	Reading	West Ham United	
2 August 2023	Emma Bissell	(United States) Florida State Seminoles	Everton	
2 August 2023	(United States) Kaylan Marckese	Arsenal	Bristol City (loan)	
2 August 2023	Tara Bourne	Manchester United	Sheffield United	
3 August 2023	Emily Orman	Chelsea	Reading (loan)	
3 August 2023	Rose Kite	Unattached	Reading	
3 August 2023	(Belgium) Justine Vanhaevermaet	Reading	Everton	
3 August 2023	Michelle Agyemang	Arsenal	Watford (dual signing)	
3 August 2023	Katie Reid	Arsenal	Watford (dual signing)	
3 August 2023	Laila Harbert	Arsenal	Watford (dual signing)	
4 August 2023	(Republic of Ireland) Tyler Toland	(Spain) Levante UD	Blackburn Rovers	
4 August 2023	(United States) Mia Fishel	(Mexico) Tigres UANL	Chelsea	
4 August 2023	Tinaya Alexander	Reading	London City Lionesses	
4 August 2023	Carla Humphrey	Liverpool	Charlton Athletic	
7 August 2023	(New Zealand) Olivia Page	(New Zealand) Eastern Suburbs	Sheffield United	
7 August 2023	(Scotland) Eartha Cumings	Liverpool	(Sweden) Rosengård	
8 August 2023	(Wales) Georgia Walters	Sheffield United	Blackburn Rovers	
9 August 2023	Kate Oakley	Liverpool Academy	Lewes	
9 August 2023	Isabel Milne	Chelsea Academy	Southampton	
9 August 2023	Georgia Brougham	Unattached	London City Lionesses	
9 August 2023	Abbie Lafayette	Ipswich Town	Watford	
10 August 2023	Emma Taylor	Unattached	Blackburn Rovers	
10 August 2023	(Northern Ireland) Natalie Johnson	Lewes	Nottingham Forest	
10 August 2023	(Dominican Republic) Lucía León	(Spain) Real Betis	Watford	
11 August 2023	(New Zealand) Rebekah Stott	Brighton & Hove Albion	(Australia) Melbourne City	
11 August 2023	(New Zealand) Paige Satchell	(New Zealand) Wellington Phoenix	London City Lionesses	
11 August 2023	(Scotland) Kirsty Hanson	Aston Villa	Manchester United (end of loan)	
11 August 2023	(Scotland) Kirsty Hanson	Manchester United	Aston Villa	
11 August 2023	(United States) Katelin Talbert	Unattached	West Ham United	
11 August 2023	(United States) Katelin Talbert	West Ham United	(Sweden) Djurgården (loan)	
13 August 2023	(Venezuela) Sonia O'Neill	(Germany) Turbine Potsdam	London City Lionesses	
14 August 2023	Grace Clinton	Manchester United	Tottenham Hotspur (loan)	
14 August 2023	(Scotland) Jamie-Lee Napier	London City Lionesses	Bristol City	
14 August 2023	(Denmark) Amalie Thestrup	(Netherlands) PSV	Bristol City	
15 August 2023	(Jamaica) Atlanta Primus	London City Lionesses	Southampton	
15 August 2023	(Republic of Ireland) Grace Moloney	Reading	London City Lionesses	
15 August 2023	(Denmark) Karoline Olesen	(Denmark) Fortuna Hjørring	Everton	
15 August 2023	Charlotte Wardlaw	Chelsea	(Scotland) Glasgow City (loan)	
15 August 2023	Carly Johns	Unattached	Watford	
16 August 2023	(Netherlands) Lize Kop	Unattached	Leicester City	
16 August 2023	Kayleigh Mcdonald	Blackburn Rovers	Unattached	
16 August 2023	(Republic of Ireland) Niamh Farrelly	(Italy) Parma	London City Lionesses	
16 August 2023	(Finland) Olga Ahtinen	(Sweden) Linköping	Tottenham Hotspur	
16 August 2023	(Republic of Ireland) Kyra Carusa	London City Lionesses	(United States) San Diego Wave	
17 August 2023	(Czech Republic) Barbora Votíková	Unattached	Tottenham Hotspur	
17 August 2023	(Scotland) Emma Mukandi	Reading	London City Lionesses	
17 August 2023	Alanta Brown	Burnley	Sheffield United	
18 August 2023	(Brazil) Geyse	(Spain) Barcelona	Manchester United	
18 August 2023	Emma Thompson	Chelsea	Southampton	
18 August 2023	(Republic of Ireland) Megan Walsh	Brighton & Hove Albion	West Ham United	
19 August 2023	(Republic of Ireland) Lily Agg	London City Lionesses	Birmingham City	
21 August 2023	Emily Simpkins	Charlton Athletic	Unattached	
21 August 2023	(Nigeria) Juliet Adebowale-Arimoro	London Bees	Sheffield United	
22 August 2023	Karin Muya	London City Lionesses	Charlton Athletic	
22 August 2023	Danielle Carter	Brighton & Hove Albion	London City Lionesses	
22 August 2023	Ellie May	Burnley	Sheffield United	
22 August 2023	Lucy Shepherd	London City Lionesses	Blackburn Rovers	
23 August 2023	(Russia) Alsu Abdullina	Chelsea	(France) Paris FC (loan)	
23 August 2023	(Republic of Ireland) Ruesha Littlejohn	Aston Villa	London City Lionesses	
23 August 2023	Shauna Vassell	London Bees	Lewes	
24 August 2023	Keira Barry	Manchester United	Crystal Palace (loan)	
24 August 2023	(Republic of Ireland) Megan Connolly	Brighton & Hove Albion	Bristol City	
25 August 2023	(Finland) Jutta Rantala	(Sweden) Vittsjö	Leicester City	
25 August 2023	Jade Moore	Manchester United	Birmingham City	
25 August 2023	(Republic of Ireland) Heather Payne	(United States) Florida State Seminoles	Everton	
25 August 2023	Hannah Silcock	Liverpool	Blackburn Rovers (loan)	
25 August 2023	Georgia Wilson	(Denmark) AaB	Reading	
25 August 2023	(Scotland) Emma Watson	Unattached	Manchester United	
25 August 2023	Charlotte Fleming	London City Lionesses	Watford	
26 August 2023	Chantelle Boye-Hlorkah	Aston Villa	London City Lionesses	
29 August 2023	(Spain) Laia Codina	(Spain) Barcelona	Arsenal	
30 August 2023	(Norway) Maria Thorisdottir	Manchester United	Brighton & Hove Albion	
31 August 2023	(United States) Brianna Visalli	Brighton & Hove Albion	(Denmark) AGF	
1 September 2023	(France) Julie Thibaud	(France) Bordeaux	Leicester City	
1 September 2023	(Wales) Josie Longhurst	Lewes	Reading	
1 September 2023	(China) Li Mengwen	(China) Jiangsu	Brighton & Hove Albion	
1 September 2023	Lenna Gunning-Williams	Tottenham Hotspur	Ipswich Town (loan)	
2 September 2023	Araya Dennis	Arsenal	Crystal Palace (dual registration)	
2 September 2023	(Jamaica) Izzy Groves	(France) Saint-Malo	London City Lionesses	
2 September 2023	(Republic of Ireland) Kate Mooney	(Republic of Ireland) Peamount United	Lewes	
2 September 2023	Jemima Dahou	Manchester City	Blackburn Rovers (dual registration)	
3 September 2023	(United States) Katie Stengel	(United States) NJ/NY Gotham	Liverpool (end of loan)	
3 September 2023	Lexi Potter	Chelsea	Crystal Palace (loan)	
4 September 2023	(United States) Vicky Bruce	Bristol City	(Australia) Western Sydney Wanderers	
4 September 2023	(Netherlands) Wieke Kaptein	(Netherlands) Twente	Chelsea	
4 September 2023	(Netherlands) Wieke Kaptein	Chelsea	(Netherlands) Twente (loan)	
5 September 2023	(Poland) Nikola Karczewska	Tottenham Hotspur	(Germany) Bayer Leverkusen (loan)	
6 September 2023	(Wales) Carrie Jones	Leicester City	Manchester United (end of loan)	
6 September 2023	(Wales) Carrie Jones	Manchester United	Bristol City	
6 September 2023	(Portugal) Tatiana Pinto	(Spain) Levante	Brighton & Hove Albion	
6 September 2023	(Japan) Hinata Miyazawa	(Japan) MyNavi Sendai	Manchester United	
6 September 2023	(Norway) Sophie Román Haug	(Italy) Roma	Liverpool	
7 September 2023	(Japan) Maika Hamano	(Sweden) Hammarby	Chelsea (end of loan)	
7 September 2023	(Australia) Libby Copus-Brown	Lewes	(Australia) Newcastle Jets	
7 September 2023	Halle Houssein	West Ham United	Reading (loan)	
8 September 2023	(Canada) Deanne Rose	Reading	Leicester City	
8 September 2023	Ebony Salmon	(United States) Houston Dash	Aston Villa	
8 September 2023	Chelsea Ferguson	Brighton & Hove Albion	Blackburn Rovers (loan)	
11 September 2023	(Canada) Adriana Leon	Manchester United	Aston Villa	
12 September 2023	(Norway) Vilde Bøe Risa	Manchester United	(Spain) Atlético Madrid	
12 September 2023	(Japan) Riko Ueki	(Japan) Tokyo Verdy Beleza	West Ham United	
12 September 2023	(United States) Katie Stengel	Liverpool	(United States) NJ/NY Gotham	
13 September 2023	(Colombia) Jorelyn Carabalí	(Brazil) Atlético Mineiro	Brighton & Hove Albion	
13 September 2023	(Denmark) Sille Struck	(Spain) Levante Las Planas	Bristol City	
14 September 2023	(Brazil) Ivana Fuso	Manchester United	Birmingham City	
14 September 2023	Lulu Jarvis	Brighton & Hove Albion	Reading (loan)	
14 September 2023	(Spain) Irene Guerrero	(Spain) Atlético Madrid	Manchester United	
14 September 2023	(China) Zhang Linyan	(China) Wuhan Jianghan University	Tottenham Hotspur (loan)	
14 September 2023	Libby Bance	Brighton & Hove Albion	(Scotland) Rangers (loan)	
14 September 2023	Caitlin Smith	(United States) Clemson Tigers	Reading	
14 September 2023	(Scotland) Martha Thomas	Manchester United	Tottenham Hotspur	
14 September 2023	Freya Gregory	Aston Villa	Reading (loan)	
14 September 2023	(South Korea) Park Ye-eun	Brighton & Hove Albion	(Scotland) Heart of Midlothian	
14 September 2023	Gabby George	Everton	Manchester United	
14 September 2023	(South Korea) Cho So-hyun	Tottenham Hotspur	Birmingham City	
14 September 2023	(Belgium) Nicky Evrard	Chelsea	Brighton & Hove Albion (loan)	
14 September 2023	Jess Simpson	Manchester United	Bristol City (loan)	
14 September 2023	(United States) Phallon Tullis-Joyce	(United States) OL Reign	Manchester United	
14 September 2023	Sophie Baggaley	Manchester United	Brighton & Hove Albion	
15 September 2023	(Australia) Kyra Cooney-Cross	(Sweden) Hammarby	Arsenal	
15 September 2023	(South Korea) Choe Yu-ri	(South Korea) Hyundai Steel Red Angels	Birmingham City	
15 September 2023	Alyssa Aherne	Manchester United	Everton (loan)	
15 September 2023	(France) Melvine Malard	(France) Lyon	Manchester United (loan)	
15 September 2023	(Canada) Paige Culver	(Germany) Turbine Potsdam	London City Lionesses	
15 September 2023	Lucy Watson	Chelsea	Crystal Palace (loan)	
16 September 2023	(Australia) Lydia Williams	Brighton & Hove Albion	(Australia) Melbourne Victory	
16 September 2023	Mollie Rouse	(Germany) Turbine Potsdam	Sunderland	
16 September 2023	Abi Cowie	Birmingham City	Nottingham Forest (loan)	
16 September 2023	Louanne Worsey	Birmingham City	Nottingham Forest (loan)	
22 September 2023	Maddy Cusack	Sheffield United	Passed away	
23 September 2023	Georgie Ferguson	Watford	Birmingham City	
28 September 2023	Libby Hart	Unattached	Everton	
28 September 2023	Demi Lambourne	Leicester City	Crystal Palace (loan)	
29 September 2023	(Republic of Ireland) Megan Campbell	Liverpool	Everton	

Player was released to free agency before joining new club
