= List of English women's football transfers winter 2023–24 =

The 2023–24 English women's football winter transfer window ran from 2 September 2023 to 2 February 2024. Players without a club could be signed at any time, clubs could sign players on loan dependent on their league's regulations, and clubs could sign a goalkeeper on an emergency loan if they had no registered senior goalkeeper available. This list includes transfers featuring at least one club from either the Women's Super League or the Women's Championship that were completed after the end of the summer 2023 transfer window on 31 August and before the end of the 2023—24 winter window.

== Transfers ==
All players and clubs without a flag are English.

Date	Name	Moving from	Moving to	Ref.
4 November 2023	Leanne Cowan	Crystal Palace	London City Lionesses	
19 November 2023	(Norway) Benedicte Håland	Unattached	Bristol City	
8 December 2023	(China) Wang Shuang	(United States) Racing Louisville	Tottenham Hotspur	
8 December 2023	(Japan) Saori Takarada	(Sweden) Linköping	Leicester City	
20 December 2023	(New Zealand) Jacqui Hand	(Finland) Åland United	Lewes	
22 December 2023	(United States) Kristie Mewis	(United States) Gotham FC	West Ham United	
29 December 2023	(Australia) Mackenzie Hawkesby	Brighton & Hove Albion	(Australia) Sydney FC	
2 January 2024	(Sweden) Matilda Vinberg	(Sweden) Hammarby	Tottenham Hotspur	
3 January 2024	Jess Reavill	Leicester City	West Bromwich Albion (dual registration)	
3 January 2024	(Canada) Shelina Zadorsky	Tottenham Hotspur	West Ham United (loan)	
3 January 2024	(Australia) Charlotte Grant	Unattached	Tottenham Hotspur	
4 January 2024	(United States) Kaylan Marckese	Bristol City	Arsenal (end of loan)	
4 January 2024	Freya Gregory	Reading	Aston Villa (end of loan)	
4 January 2024	Rose Kite	Reading	Unattached	
4 January 2024	Freya Meadows-Tuson	Reading	Unattached	
5 January 2024	Alyssa Aherne	Everton	Manchester United (end of loan)	
5 January 2024	(Japan) Yuka Momiki	(Sweden) Linköpings	Leicester City	
5 January 2024	(Republic of Ireland) Lois Roche	Charlton Athletic	Lewes	
5 January 2024	(United States) Shae Yanez	(United States) San Diego Wave	Bristol City	
5 January 2024	(Australia) Katrina Gorry	Unattached	West Ham United	
5 January 2024	Lois Edwards	Watford	(Scotland) Aberdeen	
6 January 2024	(Switzerland) Noelle Maritz	Arsenal	Aston Villa	
6 January 2024	Ginny Lackey	Manchester City	Burnley (dual registration)	
8 January 2024	Chelsea Ferguson	Blackburn Rovers	Brighton & Hove Albion (end of loan)	
9 January 2024	(Belgium) Nicky Evrard	Brighton & Hove Albion	Chelsea (end of loan)	
10 January 2024	(Sweden) Nathalie Björn	Everton	Chelsea	
10 January 2024	Melisa Filis	West Ham United	Charlton Athletic (loan)	
11 January 2024	(Denmark) Sanne Troelsgaard Nielsen	Reading	Unattached	
11 January 2024	(United States) Emily Fox	(United States) North Carolina Courage	Arsenal	
12 January 2024	Jesse Woolley	Bristol City	Reading (loan)	
12 January 2024	(New Zealand) Ria Percival	Tottenham Hotspur	Crystal Palace (loan)	
12 January 2024	Gracie Pearse	Tottenham Hotspur	Charlton Athletic (loan)	
13 January 2024	(Denmark) Kathrine Møller Kühl	Arsenal	Everton (loan)	
13 January 2024	(Denmark) Rikke Madsen	(United States) North Carolina Courage	Everton	
13 January 2024	(Scotland) Hannah Godfrey	Charlton Athletic	Lewes	
15 January 2024	Holly Mears	Leicester City	Nottingham Forest (dual registration)	
16 January 2024	Olivia McLoughlin	Aston Villa	(Scotland) Rangers (loan)	
18 January 2024	Aimee Claypole	Chelsea	Lewes (loan)	
18 January 2024	(Sweden) Amanda Nildén	(Italy) Juventus	Tottenham Hotspur (loan)	
19 January 2024	(Scotland) Lois Heuchan	London City Lionesses	Lewes	
19 January 2024	(Norway) Benedicte Håland	Bristol City	Unattached	
19 January 2024	(Wales) Safia Middleton-Patel	Manchester United	Watford (dual registration)	
20 January 2024	Katie Bradley	Unattached	Blackburn Rovers	
20 January 2024	Corinne Henson	Watford	London City Lionesses	
20 January 2024	(Norway) Julie Blakstad	Manchester City	(Sweden) Hammarby	
20 January 2024	(Canada) Sarah Stratigakis	Unattached	Bristol City	
22 January 2024	(Germany) Melina Loeck	(Sweden) Kristianstad	Brighton & Hove Albion	
22 January 2024	(Wales) Tianna Teisar	Bristol City	(Wales) Cardiff City Ladies (loan)	
23 January 2024	(China) Zhang Linyan	Tottenham Hotspur	(China) Wuhan Jianghan University (end of loan)	
23 January 2024	(Norway) Benedicte Håland	Bristol City	Southampton	
23 January 2024	(Northern Ireland) Rebecca Holloway	(United States) Racing Louisville	Birmingham City	
24 January 2024	Asmita Ale	Tottenham Hotspur	Leicester City (loan)	
24 January 2024	Natasha Flint	Liverpool	(Scotland) Celtic (loan)	
25 January 2024	(Scotland) Lisa Evans	West Ham United	Bristol City	
25 January 2024	(Brazil) Giovana	Arsenal	(Spain) Madrid CFF (loan)	
26 January 2024	(Colombia) Mayra Ramírez	(Spain) Levante	Chelsea	
26 January 2024	(Republic of Ireland) Jessie Stapleton	West Ham United	Reading (loan)	
26 January 2024	Evie Smith	Blackburn Rovers	Stoke City (loan)	
26 January 2024	(Venezuela) Deyna Castellanos	Manchester City	(United States) Bay FC	
27 January 2024	(Sweden) Emilia Pelgander	(Sweden) Örebro	Leicester City	
27 January 2024	(Republic of Ireland) Isibeal Atkinson	West Ham United	Crystal Palace	
27 January 2024	Olivia Bramley	Unattached	Durham	
30 January 2024	(France) Sarah Bouhaddi	Unattached	Arsenal	
30 January 2024	(Republic of Ireland) Kate Mooney	Lewes	Unattached	
31 January 2024	Cerys Brown	Chelsea	Watford (loan)	
31 January 2024	(Canada) Jessie Fleming	Chelsea	(United States) Portland Thorns	
31 January 2024	Lia Cataldo	Crystal Palace	Newcastle United	
31 January 2024	(Jamaica) Paige Bailey-Gayle	Crystal Palace	Newcastle United	
31 January 2024	Chelsea Ferguson	Brighton & Hove Albion	Lewes (loan)	
31 January 2024	(Wales) Angharad James	Tottenham Hotspur	(United States) Seattle Reign	
31 January 2024	Keira Flannery	West Ham United	Reading (loan)	
31 January 2024	(Republic of Ireland) Abbie Larkin	(Scotland) Glasgow City	Crystal Palace	
31 January 2024	(Sweden) Marika Bergman-Lundin	(Sweden) Häcken	West Ham United	
31 January 2024	(Wales) Lily Woodham	Reading	(United States) Seattle Reign	
31 January 2024	(Republic of Ireland) Megan Campbell	Everton	London City Lionesses	
31 January 2024	Poppy Pritchard	Durham	Manchester City	
31 January 2024	(Republic of Ireland) Tara O'Hanlon	(Republic of Ireland) Peamount United	Manchester City	
31 January 2024	Laura Blindkilde	Aston Villa	Manchester City	
1 February 2024	(United States) Taylor Smith	(United States) Gotham FC	Brighton & Hove Albion (loan)	
1 February 2024	Comfort Erhabor	Brighton & Hove Albion	(Scotland) Hibernian (loan)	
1 February 2024	(Finland) Lotta Lindström	(Finland) HJK Helsinki	London City Lionesses	
1 February 2024	Miri Taylor	Liverpool	Aston Villa (loan)	
1 February 2024	Monique Robinson	Leicester City	Burnley (loan)	
1 February 2024	Eleanor Dale	(United States) Nebraska Cornhuskers	Everton	
2 February 2024	Ellie Noble	Crystal Palace	Oxford United (loan)	
2 February 2024	(Scotland) Jen Beattie	Arsenal	(United States) Bay FC	
2 February 2024	Abbi Jenner	Birmingham City	Stoke City (loan)	
2 February 2024	Layla Banaras	Birmingham City	Wolverhampton Wanderers (dual registration)	
3 February 2024	(Northern Ireland) Danielle Maxwell	(Northern Ireland) Cliftonville	Blackburn Rovers	
4 February 2024	(Jamaica) Jade Bailey	Unattached	London City Lionesses	
5 February 2024	(Czech Republic) Kateřina Svitková	Chelsea	(Czech Republic) Slavia Prague (loan)	
9 February 2024	Abby Clarke	Everton	Burnley	
16 February 2024	Taylor Bell	Charlton Athletic	Chatham Town (dual registration)	
17 February 2024	Katie Reid	Watford	Arsenal (end of loan)	
8 March 2024	(United States) Taylor Smith	Brighton & Hove Albion	(United States) Gotham FC (end of loan)	
15 March 2024	Beth Howard	Southampton	Watford (loan)	
26 March 2024	(France) Sarah Bouhaddi	Arsenal	Unattached	
11 April 2024	Beth Howard	Watford	Southampton (end of loan)	
29 March 2024	Evie Smith	Stoke City	Blackburn Rovers (end of loan)	
29 March 2024	Evie Smith	Blackburn Rovers	Unattached	
14 April 2024	Katie Startup	Brighton & Hove Albion	Manchester City (loan)	
19 April 2024	(Germany) Ann-Katrin Berger	Chelsea	(United States) Gotham FC	

Player was released to free agency before joining new club
