= 2022–23 Women's Super League =

Twelfth season of the top English women's association football league

Women's Super League
- Season: 2022–23
- Dates: 16 September 2022 – 27 May 2023
- Champions: Chelsea; 6th title
- Relegated: Reading
- Champions League: Chelsea; Manchester United; Arsenal
- Matches: 132
- Goals: 439 (3.33 per match)
- Top goalscorer: Rachel Daly (22 goals)
- Biggest home win: Chelsea 7–0 Everton; 7 May 2023
- Biggest away win: Brighton & Hove Albion 0–8 Tottenham Hotspur; 30 October 2022; Leicester City 0–8 Chelsea; 3 December 2022
- Highest scoring: West Ham United 4–5 Brighton & Hove Albion; 6 November 2022
- Highest attendance: 47,367; Arsenal 4–0 Tottenham Hotspur (24 September 2022)

The 2022–23 Women's Super League season (also known as the Barclays Women's Super League for sponsorship reasons) was the 12th edition of the Women's Super League (WSL) since it was formed in 2010. It was the fifth season after the rebranding of the four highest levels in English women's football.

Ahead of the season the top two tiers unveiled a new visual identity, dropping "The FA" from the league names as part of the long term strategy for the leagues to be under new ownership in the future. Due to start on 9 September 2022, the FA postponed all of the weekend's football fixtures following the death of Queen Elizabeth II on 8 September 2022. The first match was instead played the following week on 16 September.

Chelsea successfully defended their title by defeating Reading, whose relegation from the division after an eight-year stint was confirmed by the result, 3–0 on the final matchday. It was Chelsea's fourth consecutive and sixth overall WSL title. Manchester United became the first side since 2014 to break into the WSL's top three which had been occupied by Chelsea, Arsenal and Manchester City in various combinations for the previous seven seasons.

Rachel Daly was topscorer and equalled the league record of 22 goals first set by Vivianne Miedema in 2018–19. She became the first English player to win the award since Ellen White in 2017–18. Mary Earps won the golden glove and broke the record for clean sheets in a WSL season with 14.

On 24 September 2022, a new record WSL attendance was set at 47,367 during a match between Arsenal and Tottenham Hotspur at the Emirates Stadium. Arsenal won 4–0.

== Teams ==
Twelve teams contested the 2022–23 Women's Super League season. Liverpool were confirmed as the 2021–22 FA Women's Championship champions on 3 April 2022, ensuring that they would return to the WSL for the first time since the 2019–20 season after a two year absence. On 4 May 2022, founding members Birmingham City were relegated meaning the 2022–23 season was the first WSL season without them.

Locations of the 2022–23 WSL teams

Team	Location	Ground	Capacity	2021–22 season
Arsenal	Borehamwood	Meadow Park (Note: Three matches moved to the Emirates Stadium.)	4,050	2nd
Aston Villa	Walsall	Bescot Stadium (Note: Five matches moved to Villa Park.)	11,300	9th
Brighton & Hove Albion	Crawley	Broadfield Stadium (Note: Match v Reading moved to Falmer Stadium.)	5,800	7th
Chelsea	Kingston upon Thames	Kingsmeadow (Note: Match v Tottenham Hotspur moved to Stamford Bridge.)	4,850	1st
Everton	Liverpool	Walton Hall Park	2,200	10th
Leicester City	Leicester	King Power Stadium	32,212	11th
Liverpool	Birkenhead	Prenton Park (Note: Match v Everton moved to Anfield.)	16,547	WC, 1st
Manchester City	Manchester	Academy Stadium (Note: Match v Manchester United moved to City of Manchester Stadium.)	7,000	3rd
Manchester United	Leigh	Leigh Sports Village (Note: Two matches moved to Old Trafford.)	12,000	4th
Reading	Reading	Madejski Stadium	24,161	8th
Tottenham Hotspur	Leyton	Brisbane Road (Note: Three matches moved to Tottenham Hotspur Stadium.)	9,271	5th
West Ham United	Dagenham	Victoria Road	6,078	6th

=== Stadium changes ===
Having spent the previous three seasons at The Hive Stadium following promotion to the WSL in 2019, Tottenham Hotspur relocated to Brisbane Road, home of Leyton Orient, ahead of the 2022–23 season.

In addition, eight of the ten clubs whose women's team play at secondary stadia moved select matches to the club's primary ground throughout the season. This would have included on opening weekend with Brighton & Hove Albion hosting Aston Villa at Falmer Stadium, Chelsea hosting West Ham United at Stamford Bridge, and Tottenham Hotspur hosting Manchester United at Tottenham Hotspur Stadium. With Reading already playing at the Madejski Stadium, it would have meant four of the six openers taking place at the stadium used by their respective clubs' men's team with Everton and Manchester City the only home sides not to do so. However, the opening weekend was postponed along with all other football fixture in the country following the death of Elizabeth II, meaning the predicted "record breaking start" to the season off the back of Euro 2022 was on hold. Everton and West Ham United were the two teams to not play any WSL matches at the club's primary ground during the season.

=== Personnel and kits ===
Team	Manager	Captain	Kit manufacturer	Shirt sponsor
Arsenal	(Sweden) Jonas Eidevall	(Scotland) Kim Little	Adidas	Fly Emirates
Aston Villa	(England) Carla Ward	(Scotland) Rachel Corsie	Castore	Cazoo
Brighton & Hove Albion	(United States) Melissa Phillips	(Jamaica) Victoria Williams	Nike	American Express
Chelsea	(England) Emma Hayes	(Sweden) Magdalena Eriksson	Nike	Three
Everton	(Denmark) Brian Sørensen	(Scotland) Lucy Graham	Hummel	Stake.com
Leicester City	(Scotland) Willie Kirk	(England) Aileen Whelan	Adidas	FBS
Liverpool	(England) Matt Beard	(Republic of Ireland) Niamh Fahey	Nike	Standard Chartered
Manchester City	(Wales) Gareth Taylor	(England) Steph Houghton	Puma	Etihad Airways
Manchester United	(England) Marc Skinner	(England) Katie Zelem	Adidas	TeamViewer
Reading	(England) Kelly Chambers	(Scotland) Emma Mukandi	Macron	Select Car Leasing
Tottenham Hotspur	(England) Vicky Jepson (interim)	(Canada) Shelina Zadorsky	Nike	AIA
West Ham United	(England) Paul Konchesky	(Iceland) Dagný Brynjarsdóttir	Umbro	Betway

=== Managerial changes ===
Team	Outgoing manager	Manner of departure	Date of vacancy	Position in table	Incoming manager	Date of appointment
Everton	(England) Chris Roberts (interim)	End of interim period	8 May 2022	End of season (10th)	(Denmark) Brian Sørensen	5 June 2022
West Ham United	(New Zealand) Olli Harder	Resigned	8 May 2022	End of season (6th)	(England) Paul Konchesky	8 May 2022
Brighton & Hove Albion	(England) Hope Powell	Resigned	31 October 2022	11th	(England) Amy Merricks (interim)	31 October 2022
Leicester City	(England) Lydia Bedford	Sacked	3 November 2022	12th	(Scotland) Willie Kirk	3 November 2022
Brighton & Hove Albion	(England) Amy Merricks (interim)	End of interim period	28 December 2022	11th	(Germany) Jens Scheuer	28 December 2022
Brighton & Hove Albion	(Germany) Jens Scheuer	Mutual consent	6 March 2023	11th	(England) Amy Merricks (interim)	6 March 2023
Tottenham Hotspur	(England) Rehanne Skinner	Sacked	13 March 2023	10th	(England) Vicky Jepson (interim)	13 March 2023
Brighton & Hove Albion	(England) Amy Merricks (interim)	End of interim period	7 April 2023	12th	(United States) Melissa Phillips	7 April 2023

== League table ==
Pos	Team	Pld	W	D	L	GF	GA	GD	Pts	Qualification or relegation
1	Chelsea (C)	22	19	1	2	66	15	+51	58	Qualification for the Champions League group stage (Note: England's UEFA association coefficient meant, as the 4th ranked association, the WSL champions qualified for the second round. However, as 2022–23 UEFA Women's Champions League winners Barcelona had already qualified for the group stage as 2022–23 Liga F champions, the title holders' berth to the group stage was redistributed to Chelsea.)
2	Manchester United	22	18	2	2	56	12	+44	56	Qualification for the Champions League second round
3	Arsenal	22	15	2	5	49	16	+33	47	Qualification for the Champions League first round
4	Manchester City	22	15	2	5	50	25	+25	47	
5	Aston Villa	22	11	4	7	47	37	+10	37	
6	Everton	22	9	3	10	29	36	−7	30	
7	Liverpool	22	6	5	11	24	39	−15	23	
8	West Ham United	22	6	3	13	23	44	−21	21	
9	Tottenham Hotspur	22	5	3	14	31	47	−16	18	
10	Leicester City	22	5	1	16	15	48	−33	16	
11	Brighton & Hove Albion	22	4	4	14	26	63	−37	16	
12	Reading (R)	22	3	2	17	23	57	−34	11	Relegation to the Championship

Source: Women's Super League
Rules for classification: 1) Points; 2) Goal difference; 3) Number of goals scored.
(C) Champions; (R) Relegated

== Results ==
Home \ Away	ARS	AVL	BHA	CHE	EVE	LEI	LIV	MCI	MNU	REA	TOT	WHU
Arsenal	—	0–2	4–0	1–1	1–0	1–0	2–0	2–1	2–3	4–0	4–0	3–1
Aston Villa	1–4	—	1–1	0–3	0–1	5–0	3–3	4–3	2–3	3–1	2–1	1–2
Brighton & Hove Albion	0–4	2–6	—	0–2	3–2	0–1	3–3	1–2	0–4	2–1	0–8	1–0
Chelsea	2–0	3–1	3–1	—	7–0	6–0	2–1	2–0	1–0	3–2	3–0	3–1
Everton	1–4	0–2	2–1	1–3	—	1–0	1–1	1–2	0–3	3–2	2–1	3–0
Leicester City	0–4	0–2	3–0	0–8	0–0	—	4–0	0–2	0–1	2–1	1–2	1–2
Liverpool	0–2	0–1	2–1	2–1	0–3	0–1	—	2–1	0–1	2–0	2–1	2–0
Manchester City	2–1	1–1	3–1	2–0	3–2	4–0	2–1	—	1–1	4–1	3–1	6–2
Manchester United	1–0	5–0	4–0	1–3	0–0	5–1	6–0	2–1	—	4–0	3–0	4–0
Reading	0–1	0–5	2–2	0–3	2–3	2–1	3–3	0–3	0–1	—	1–0	2–1
Tottenham Hotspur	1–5	3–3	2–2	2–3	0–3	1–0	1–0	0–3	1–2	4–1	—	0–2
West Ham United	0–0	1–2	4–5	0–4	1–0	1–0	0–0	0–1	0–2	3–2	2–2	—

Source: The FA
Legend: Blue = home team win; Yellow = draw; Red = away team win.

== Season statistics ==
=== Top scorers ===
Rank	Player	Club	Goals
1	(England) Rachel Daly	Aston Villa	22
2	(Jamaica) Khadija Shaw	Manchester City	20
3	Bethany England	Chelsea / Tottenham Hotspur	14^{*}
4	(Australia) Sam Kerr	Chelsea	12
5	(England) Leah Galton	Manchester United	10
5	(England) Alessia Russo	Manchester United	10
7	(Norway) Frida Maanum	Arsenal	9
7	(Norway) Guro Reiten	Chelsea	9
7	(United States) Katie Stengel	Liverpool	9
10	(Sweden) Stina Blackstenius	Arsenal	8
10	(Spain) Lucía García	Manchester United	8
10	(Denmark) Pernille Harder	Chelsea	8

Notes

- ^{*} 2 goals for Chelsea, 12 goals for Tottenham Hotspur

=== Clean sheets ===
Rank	Player	Club	Clean sheets
1	(England) Mary Earps	Manchester United	14
2	(Austria) Manuela Zinsberger	Arsenal	10
3	(Germany) Ann-Katrin Berger	Chelsea	8
4	(Australia) Mackenzie Arnold	West Ham United	5
4	(England) Hannah Hampton	Aston Villa	5
4	(Germany) Janina Leitzig	Leicester City	5
4	(England) Ellie Roebuck	Manchester City	5
8	(Republic of Ireland) Courtney Brosnan	Everton	4
9	(Finland) Tinja-Riikka Korpela	Tottenham Hotspur	3
9	(England) Rachael Laws	Liverpool	3
9	(Sweden) Zećira Mušović	Chelsea	3
9	(England) Emily Ramsey	Everton	3

=== Hat-tricks ===
Player	For	Against	Result	Date	Ref.
(England) Rachel Daly	Aston Villa	Reading	3–1 (H)	20 November 2022	
(England) Jordan Nobbs	Aston Villa	Brighton & Hove Albion	6–2 (A)	12 February 2023	
(England) Alessia Russo	Manchester United	Leicester City	5–1 (H)	5 March 2023	
(Jamaica) Khadija Shaw	Manchester City	Tottenham Hotspur	3–1 (H)	5 March 2023	
(England) Rachel Daly	Aston Villa	Reading	5–0 (A)	7 May 2023	

=== Discipline ===
	Most yellow cards	Total	Most red cards	Total	Ref.
Player	(Republic of Ireland) Katie McCabe (Arsenal)	7	(England) Aggie Beever-Jones (Everton) (Northern Ireland) Jackie Burns (Reading) (France) Hawa Cissoko (West Ham United) (Sweden) Emma Kullberg (Brighton & Hove Albion) (England) Ruby Mace (Leicester City) (England) Ashleigh Neville (Tottenham Hotspur) (England) Ellie Roebuck (Manchester City) (England) Ella Toone (Manchester United)	1	
Club	Leicester City; Reading; Tottenham Hotspur	30	Brighton & Hove Albion; Everton; Leicester City; Manchester City; Manchester United; Reading; Tottenham Hotspur; West Ham United	1	

== Awards ==
=== Monthly awards ===
Month	Manager of the Month		Player of the Month		Goal of the Month		Ref.
Month	Manager	Club	Player	Club	Player	Club	Ref.
September	(England) Carla Ward	Aston Villa	(England) Rachel Daly	Aston Villa	(England) Ashleigh Neville (vs. Leicester City)	Tottenham Hotspur	
October	(England) Marc Skinner	Manchester United	(Jamaica) Khadija Shaw	Manchester City	(Wales) Rachel Rowe (vs. Leicester City)	Reading	
November	(England) Emma Hayes (United States) Denise Reddy	Chelsea	(England) Rachel Daly	Aston Villa	(Scotland) Erin Cuthbert (vs. Tottenham Hotspur)	Chelsea	
December	(England) Marc Skinner	Manchester United	(England) Leah Galton	Manchester United	(Netherlands) Vivianne Miedema (vs. Everton)	Arsenal	
January	(England) Carla Ward	Aston Villa	(England) Gabby George	Everton	(England) Rachel Williams (vs. Reading)	Manchester United	
February	(Wales) Gareth Taylor	Manchester City	(England) Jordan Nobbs	Aston Villa	(England) Lauren James (vs. Tottenham Hotspur)	Chelsea	
March	(Wales) Gareth Taylor	Manchester City	(Jamaica) Khadija Shaw	Manchester City	(Australia) Sam Kerr (vs. Manchester United)	Chelsea	
April	(England) Marc Skinner	Manchester United	(England) Chloe Kelly	Manchester City	(Republic of Ireland) Katie McCabe (vs. Manchester City)	Arsenal	

=== Annual awards ===
Award	Winner	Club
Barclays WSL Player of the Season	(England) Rachel Daly	Aston Villa
Barclays WSL Manager of the Season	(England) Emma Hayes	Chelsea
Barclays WSL Goal of the Season	(Republic of Ireland) Katie McCabe (vs. Manchester City)	Arsenal
PFA Players' Player of the Year	(England) Rachel Daly	Aston Villa
PFA Young Player of the Year	(England) Lauren James	Chelsea
FWA Footballer of the Year	(Australia) Sam Kerr	Chelsea

PFA Team of the Year
Goalkeeper	(England) Mary Earps (Manchester United)			
Defenders	(Spain) Ona Batlle (Manchester United)	(England) Maya Le Tissier (Manchester United)	(England) Alex Greenwood (Manchester City)	(Brazil) Rafaelle Souza (Arsenal)
Midfielders	(Norway) Guro Reiten (Chelsea)		(Norway) Frida Maanum (Arsenal)	(Japan) Yui Hasegawa (Manchester City)
Forwards	(England) Rachel Daly (Aston Villa)		(Jamaica) Khadija Shaw (Manchester City)	(Australia) Sam Kerr (Chelsea)

== Highest attendances ==
=== Top 10 highest attendances ===
As of 28 April 2023

Rank	Club	Attendance	Stadium	Opposition	Result	Date	Ref
1	Arsenal	47,367	Emirates Stadium	Tottenham Hotspur	4–0	24 September 2022	
2	Arsenal	46,881	Emirates Stadium	Chelsea	1–1	15 January 2023	
3	Manchester City	44,259	City of Manchester Stadium	Manchester United	1–1	11 December 2022	
4	Arsenal	40,064	Emirates Stadium	Manchester United	2–3	19 November 2022	
5	Chelsea	38,350	Stamford Bridge	Tottenham Hotspur	3–0	20 November 2022	
6	Manchester United	30,196	Old Trafford	Aston Villa	5–0	3 December 2022	
7	Liverpool	28,574	Anfield	Everton	0–3	25 September 2022	
8	Manchester United	27,919	Old Trafford	West Ham United	4–0	25 March 2023	
9	Everton	22,161	Goodison Park	Liverpool	1–1	24 March 2023	
10	Tottenham Hotspur	21,940	Tottenham Hotspur Stadium	Manchester United	1–2	12 February 2023	

=== Highest attendances by home team ===
As of 28 April 2023

Club	Attendance	Stadium	Opposition	Result	Date	Ref
Arsenal	47,367	Emirates Stadium	Tottenham Hotspur	4–0	24 September 2022	
Aston Villa	7,517	Villa Park	Manchester City	3–3	21 May 2023	
Brighton & Hove Albion	5,220	Falmer Stadium	Reading	2–1	25 September 2022	
Chelsea	38,350	Stamford Bridge	Tottenham Hotspur	3–0	20 November 2022	
Everton	22,161	Goodison Park	Liverpool	1–1	24 March 2023	
Leicester City	4,007	King Power Stadium	Manchester United	0–1	23 October 2022	
Liverpool	28,574	Anfield	Everton	0–3	25 September 2022	
Manchester City	44,259	City of Manchester Stadium	Manchester United	1–1	11 December 2022	
Manchester United	30,196	Old Trafford	Aston Villa	5–0	3 December 2022	
Reading	5,108	Madejski Stadium	Manchester United	0–1	22 January 2023	
Tottenham Hotspur	21,940	Tottenham Hotspur Stadium	Manchester United	1–2	12 February 2023	
West Ham United	2,832	Victoria Road	Arsenal	0–0	5 February 2023	
