= Park Ye-eun (disambiguation) =

Park Ye-eun (born 1989) is a South Korean singer.

Park Ye-eun may also refer to:

- Park Ye-eun (ice hockey) (born 1996), South Korean ice hockey player
- Park Ye-eun (footballer) (born 1996), South Korean footballer
