= Katie Robinson =

English footballer (born 2002)

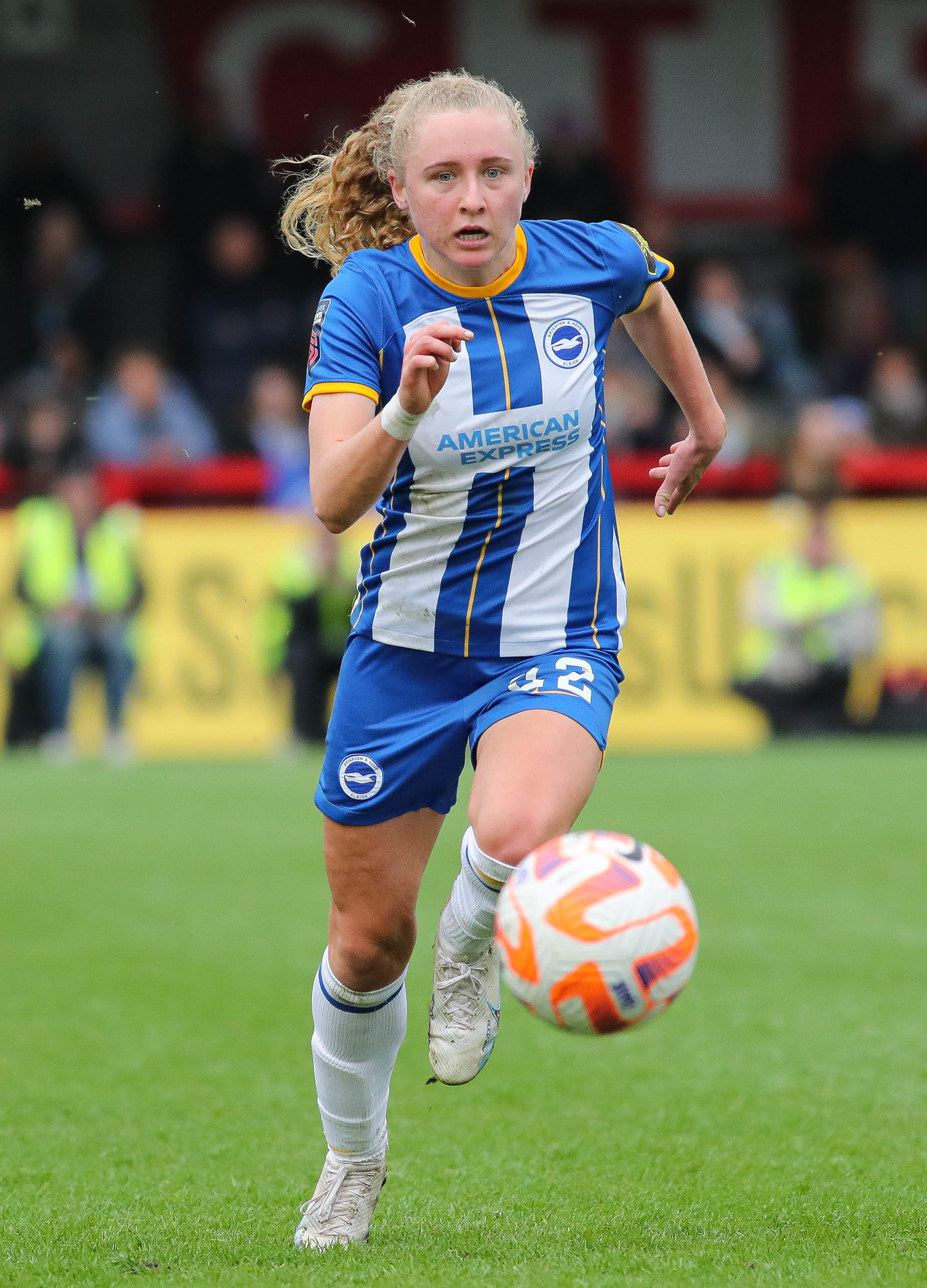
- Robinson playing for Brighton in 2023

Personal information
- Full name: Katie Louise Robinson
- Date of birth: 8 August 2002 (age 24)
- Place of birth: Newquay, Cornwall, England
- Height: 1.65 m (5 ft 5 in)
- Position: Forward

Team information
- Current team: Bristol City
- Number: 7

Youth career
- Bristol City

Senior career*
Years	Team	Apps	(Gls)
2018–2020	Bristol City	17	(0)
2020–2024	Brighton & Hove Albion	51	(7)
2022	→ Charlton Athletic (loan)	9	(1)
2024–2026	Aston Villa	16	(0)
2025	→ Everton (loan)	10	(0)
2025–	Bristol City	16	(1)

International career^{‡}
2018–2019	England U17	11	(8)
2022–2025	England U23	20	(2)
2022–2023	England	5	(0)
Medal record
Women's football
Representing England
UEFA–CONMEBOL Finalissima
Winner	2023 England
FIFA Women's World Cup
Runner-up	2023 Australia and New Zealand
- * Club domestic league appearances and goals as of 4 October 2026 ‡ National team caps and goals as of 10:51, 4 April 2025 (UTC)

Katie Louise Robinson (born 8 August 2002) is an English professional footballer who plays as a forward for Women's Super League 2 club Bristol City. Robinson previously played for Brighton & Hove Albion, Charlton Athletic, Aston Villa and Everton, and has represented the England national team.

== Club career ==
=== Youth ===
Robinson grew up in Newquay, where she had to play for Newquay Boys and Goldphin Boys from age 10 to 16 due to lack of girls' football facilities. She trained at Cornwall Girls Advanced Coaching Centre from age 10 to 12, Devon Advanced Coaching Centre from age 13 to 16, and Plymouth Argyle Boys' Centre of Excellence at age 15 before moving to Bristol to start her career there.

=== Bristol City ===
Robinson came through the ranks at the Bristol City academy. She made her senior debut for Bristol City on 14 October 2018 as an 83rd-minute substitute for Juliette Kemppi in a 1–0 loss to Birmingham City in the WSL. Robinson scored her first senior career goal on 5 December 2018 during a 5–2 victory over second-tier side Aston Villa in the League Cup. After two seasons, Robinson declined a contract extension with Bristol and departed at the end of the 2019–20 season.

=== Brighton & Hove Albion ===
On 13 July 2020, Robinson joined Brighton & Hove Albion, signing her first professional contract in the process. In September 2020, Robinson sustained an anterior cruciate ligament injury during training. This meant that she missed the rest of the 2020–21 season. She went on loan to Charlton Athletic during her recovery. In the 2022–23 season for Brighton, she contributed four goals and six assists.

On 13 June 2024, it was announced that Robinson would leave Brighton when her contract expires at the end of June 2024.

=== Aston Villa ===
On 15 July 2024, Robinson signed for Aston Villa on a two-year deal.

On 16 June 2025, Robinson signed for Everton on loan. She made 12 appearances for the club across all competitions before returning to Aston Villa in January 2026.

=== Return to Bristol City ===
On 8 January 2026, it was announced that Robinson had re-signed for Bristol City on a two and a half year contract.

== International career ==
=== Youth career ===
Robinson made her England under-17 debut on 19 September 2018 as a substitution for during 2019 Under-17 Championship qualification, scoring England's third goal in a 6–0 win against Moldova in Chișinău. On 22 September 2018, she scored another two goals in the competition in the 7–0 victory over Azerbaijan. In May 2019, during the group stages of the 2019 U17 Championship, Robinson scored the winning goal in a 2–1 victory against Austria, followed by the opening goal against the Netherlands to help secure a 2–0 win.

On 30 November 2023, one year after her senior debut, Robinson scored for the England under-23 team against France in the inaugural European League 2023–24 season.

=== Senior career ===
Robinson received her first call-up to the England senior squad in November 2022 for fixtures against Japan and Norway. She made her debut as an 83rd-minute substitute for Nikita Parris in a friendly against Norway on 15 November 2022. On 18 November 2022, her England legacy number was announced as number 227.

Robinson was named in the England squad in February 2023 for the Arnold Clark Cup. On 31 May 2023 Robinson was named in the 23-player England squad for the 2023 FIFA World Cup. She was the youngest player in the squad at age 20.

== Personal life ==
Robinson is in a relationship with fellow footballer and England youth teammate Fran Bentley.

== Career statistics ==
=== Club ===
As of match played 4 October 2026.

Appearances and goals by club, season and competition
Club	Season	League			FA Cup		League Cup		Total	
Club	Season	Division	Apps	Goals	Apps	Goals	Apps	Goals	Apps	Goals
Bristol City	2018–19	WSL	7	0	1	1	2	1	10	2
Bristol City	2019–20	WSL	10	0	2	1	5	1	17	2
Bristol City	Total		17	0	3	2	7	2	27	4
Brighton & Hove Albion	2020–21	WSL	1	0	0	0	0	0	1	0
Brighton & Hove Albion	2021–22	WSL	6	0	0	0	3	0	9	0
Brighton & Hove Albion	2022–23	WSL	22	4	4	1	3	0	29	5
Brighton & Hove Albion	2023–24	WSL	22	3	3	1	4	1	29	5
Brighton & Hove Albion	Total		51	7	7	2	10	1	68	10
Charlton Athletic (loan)	2021-22	Women's Championship	9	1	2	1	0	0	11	2
Aston Villa	2024–25	WSL	16	0	2	0	3	1	21	1
Everton (loan)	2025–26	WSL	10	0	0	0	2	0	12	0
Bristol City	2025–26	Women's Super League 2	11	0	2	0	0	0	13	0
Bristol City	2026–27	Women's Super League 2	5	1	0	0	0	0	5	1
Bristol City	Total		16	1	2	0	0	0	18	1
Career total			119	9	16	5	22	4	157	18

=== International ===
As of match played 1 July 2023

Appearances and goals by national team and year
National team	Year	Apps	Goals
England	2022	1	0
England	2023	4	0
Total		5	0

== Honours ==
England

- FIFA World Cup runner-up: 2023
- Finalissima: 2023
- Arnold Clark Cup: 2023

Individual

- Brighton & Hove Albion Player of the Season: 2022-23
- Brighton & Hove Albion Young Player of the Season: 2022-23
- Brighton & Hove Albion Goal of the Season: 2022-23
