= Jorja Fox (footballer) =

English footballer (born 2003)

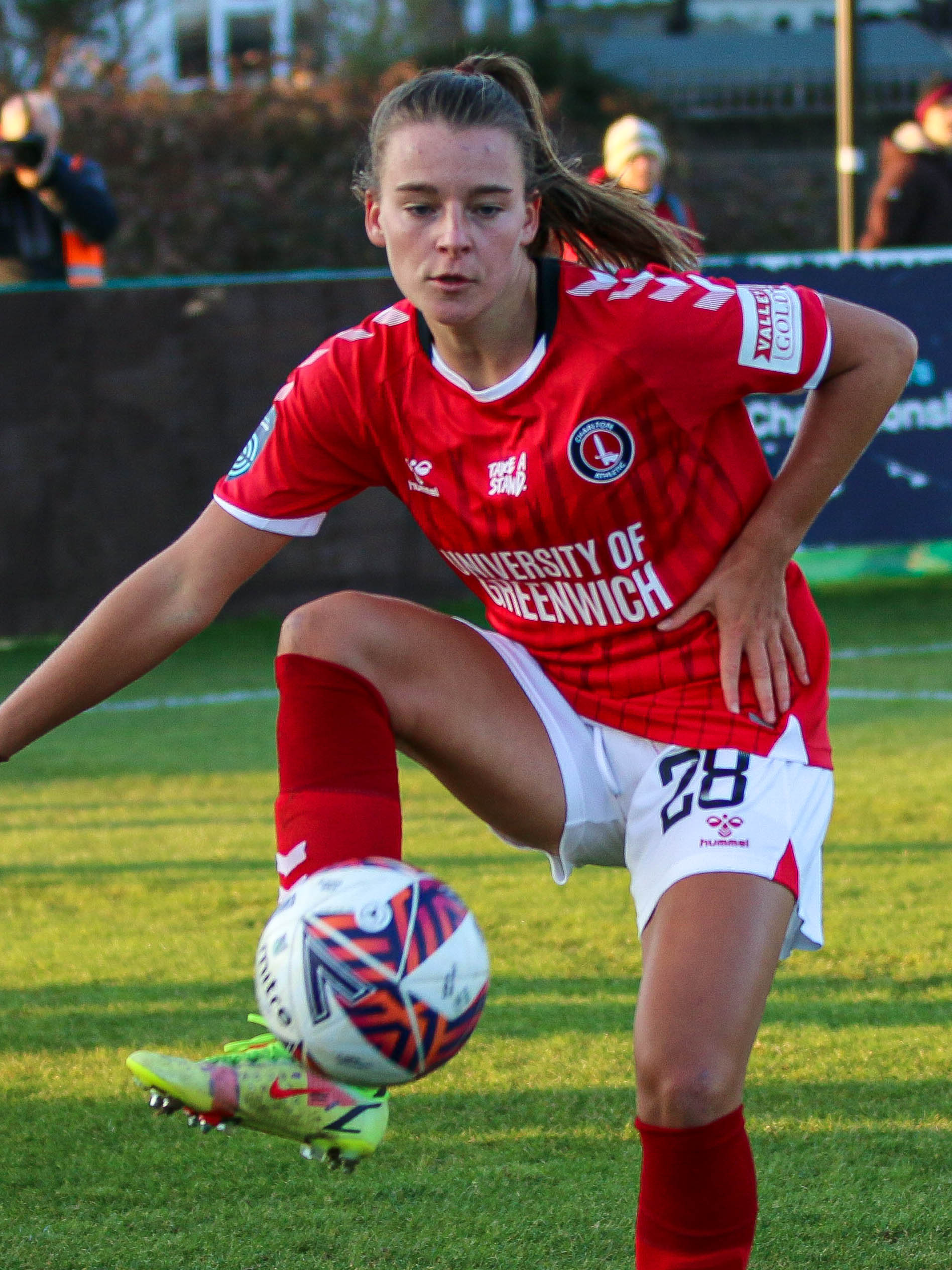
- Fox with Charlton in 2022

Personal information
- Full name: Jorja Fox
- Date of birth: 28 August 2003 (age 23)
- Place of birth: Kingston upon Thames, England
- Height: 1.69 m (5 ft 7 in)
- Position: Right-back

Team information
- Current team: Ipswich Town

Youth career
- Chelsea

Senior career*
Years	Team	Apps	(Gls)
2021–2026	Chelsea	2	(0)
2022	→ Charlton Athletic (loan)	11	(0)
2022–2023	→ Brighton & Hove Albion (loan)	18	(1)
2024	→ Crystal Palace (loan)	0	(0)
2025–2026	→ Newcastle United (loan)	2	(0)
2026–	Ipswich Town	0	(0)

International career^{‡}
2019	England U17	6	(0)
2021–	England U19	9	(1)
2023–	England U23	7	(0)
- * Club domestic league appearances and goals as of 12 December 2025 ‡ National team caps and goals as of 12:15, 7 April 2023 (UTC)

Jorja Fox (born 28 August 2003) is an English professional footballer who plays as a right-back for Women's Super League 2 club Ipswich Town. She previously played for Chelsea, and played on loan for Charlton Athletic, Brighton & Hove Albion, and Newcastle United.

== Club career ==
=== Chelsea, 2021–26 ===
Fox joined Chelsea's academy aged 8. She made her club debut with Chelsea in a 4–0 away victory against Aston Villa in the 2020–21 campaign. In the same season, she was handed her first start for the club in a 5–0 win over London City Lionesses. On 9 November 2021, Fox made her UEFA Women's Champions League debut, replacing Guro Reiten against Servette.

==== Loan to Charlton Athletic, 2022 ====
On 6 January 2022, it was announced that Fox had joined FA Women's Championship side Charlton Athletic for the remainder of the 2021–22 season.

==== Loan to Brighton & Hove Albion, 2022–23 ====
On 23 August 2022, it was announced that Fox had joined Women's Super League side Brighton & Hove Albion for the remainder of the 2022–23 season.

==== ACL injuries, 2023–25 ====
Fox returned to Chelsea in May 2023 after sustaining an anterior cruciate ligament rupture while on loan with Brighton & Hove Albion.

On 15 August 2024, Fox signed a contract extension with Chelsea until 2027 before joining newly promoted WSL side Crystal Palace on loan for the 2024–25 season. However, on 19 September, it was announced that Fox had suffered a second ACL injury in pre-season. She remained with Crystal Palace until 4 January 2025 when she returned to Chelsea to continue her recovery.

==== Loan to Newcastle United, 2025–26 ====
On 4 September 2025, it was announced that Fox had joined Women's Championship club Newcastle United on loan for the 2025–26 season. After 870 days recovering from ACL injuries, she made her return to competitive football in a start against Nottingham Forrest on 24 September 2025. Reflecting on her time spent recovering from injury and how it changed her perspective on football, she said "I often let it control how happy I was outside of football, but now I'm able to put stuff in perspective a lot better, which I think is good both on and off the pitch. My whole life, football has been what I'm good at, and it's been a way to show who I am and what I can do, and ultimately, I missed that feeling and can't wait to get a bit of my flair back."

=== Ipswich Town, 2026– ===
On 28 August 2026, Fox signed a one-year contract with Ipswich Town.

== Career statistics ==
=== Club ===
As of 27 May 2023.

Appearances and goals by club, season and competition
Club	Season	League			FA Cup (Note: Includes the FA Cup)		League Cup (Note: Includes the League Cup)		Continental		Total	
Club	Season	Division	Apps	Goals	Apps	Goals	Apps	Goals	Apps	Goals	Apps	Goals
Chelsea	2020–21	FA WSL	1	0	2	0	0	0	0	0	3	0
Chelsea	2021–22	FA WSL	1	0	0	0	0	0	1 (Note: Appearances in the UEFA Women's Champions League)	0	2	0
Chelsea	Total		2	0	2	0	0	0	1	0	5	0
Charlton Athletic (loan)	2021–22	Women's Championship	11	0	2	1	0	0	—		13	1
Brighton & Hove Albion (loan)	2022–23	WSL	18	1	3	1	3	0	—		24	2
Newcastle United (loan)	2025–26	Women's Super League 2	1	0	0	0	1	0	—		2	0
Career total			32	1	7	2	4	0	1	0	44	3
