= Amy Merricks =

English women's football coach

Personal information
- Date of birth: 21 August 1993 (age 33)
- Place of birth: Kent

Team information
- Current team: Birmingham City W.F.C.

Managerial career
- Years: Team
- 2024–: Birmingham City W.F.C.

Amy Merricks is an English professional football manager who is the current head coach of Birmingham City W.F.C..

== Career ==
From Kent, Merricks began her coaching career with Gillingham and Millwall Lionesses and also spent time working in the US. She joined Brighton in July 2015, where she had an eight-year tenure. She coached the under-13s and reserve teams before becoming the women's first-team assistant manager under George Parris and Hope Powell. During her time there, she also served as interim head coach on three occasions, becoming the youngest-serving manager in the Women's Super League. Before Brighton appointed Jens Scheuer as head coach, they also considered Merricks, who had been serving as interim head coach. In June 2023, she completed her UEFA Pro Licence. In April 2023, Merricks was appointed head coach of the England women's national under-19 football team. She has stated a desire to see more female coaches in the sport and opportunities for them in several interviews.

In April 2024, Merricks was appointed head coach of Birmingham City W.F.C., replacing Darren Carter. She was named Women's Championship/Women's Super League 2 manager of the month for October 2024, February 2025, and September 2025. In the 2024–25 season, Birmingham finished second in the league to London City Lionesses, narrowly missing out on promotion to the Women's Super League. However, they went on to win the league the following season. After securing the title, Merricks said she was proud of her players for overcoming the previous season's disappointment and a 3-0 loss in their previous match.

== Honours ==
Birmingham

- Women's Championship/Women's Super League 2: 2025–26, runner-up: 2024–25
