= Karin Muya =

English footballer (born 1995)

Personal information
- Date of birth: 26 March 1995 (age 31)
- Position: Forward

Team information
- Current team: Watford

Karin Muya is a English footballer who plays as a forward. She previously played in the FA WSL and the Serie A, as well as representing England at youth level. She currently plays for Watford.
