= Melissa Phillips =

American professional soccer coach

Personal information
- Full name: Melissa Phillips
- Date of birth: September 4, 1987 (age 39)
- Place of birth: Santa Cruz, California, United States
- Height: 5 ft 8 in (1.73 m)
- Position: Defender

Team information
- Current team: Arsenal (Coach Analyst/Head of Analysis)

Youth career
- 1998–2005: Placer United SC
- –2005: Roseville Tigers

College career
Years	Team	Apps	(Gls)
2005–2008	Stanislaus State Warriors	77	(9)

Managerial career
- 2009–2010: Cal State Bakersfield Roadrunners (assistant)
- 2011–2013: Cal State Bakersfield Roadrunners
- 2015: San Francisco Dons (assistant)
- 2015–2020: Penn Quakers (assistant)
- 2020: London City Lionesses (assistant)
- 2020–2023: London City Lionesses
- 2023: Angel City FC (assistant)
- 2023–2024: Brighton & Hove Albion

Melissa Phillips (born September 4, 1987) is an American professional soccer coach. She is currently Head of Analysis with Women’s Super League club Arsenal. She is the only American coach to win the UEFA Women's Champions League.

== Early life ==
Born on September 4, 1987, in Santa Cruz, California to Jeff and Frances Phillips, Phillips grew up in Roseville, California and attended Roseville High School. She captained the school's soccer team for two years and was named MVP as a junior and senior. She played club soccer for Placer United SC between 1998 and 2005.

=== College career ===
In 2005, Phillips earned a scholarship to study for a B.A. in health and wellness while playing college soccer at CSU Stanislaus of the NCAA Division II level California Collegiate Athletic Association (CCAA). She made 77 appearances in four seasons for the Stanislaus State Warriors and was named All-Conference CCAA second team three times. She also earned NSCAA second team All-West Region honors as a senior.

== Coaching career ==
=== Cal State Bakersfield Roadrunners ===
After graduating, Phillips moved to CSU Bakersfield in 2009 to study for an M.A. in curriculum and instruction. She served as assistant coach to Nicole Van Dyke, the head coach when Phillips was recruited by CSU Stanislaus, for the Cal State Bakersfield Roadrunners for two seasons. She also coached youth teams at Bakersfield Gunners and Turlock Tornados, and served as assistant coach at Hilmar High School. Ahead of the 2013 season, Phillips took over as head coach when Van Dyke stepped down to take an assistant role at Stanford. Aged 23, Phillips was the youngest head coach in Division I. In 2012, she led the team to six wins, the most in the program's Division I history. Phillips also coached Hedda Regefalk to Western Athletic Conference Freshman of the Year honors in 2013. She resigned at the end of the 2013 season after three years.

=== San Francisco Dons and Penn Quakers ===
Having moved to the San Francisco Bay Area to coach multiple youth clubs, Phillips was appointed as an assistant coach to Jim Millinder at the University of San Francisco in January 2015.

In April 2015, Phillips once again reunited with Nicole Van Dyke, joining as her assistant coach at the University of Pennsylvania. She spent six seasons with the Penn Quakers, helping coach the team to an Ivy League title in 2018.

=== London City Lionesses ===
In May 2020, Phillips joined London City Lionesses of the English second division Championship as assistant coach to new manager Lisa Fallon. In October 2020, Fallon stepped down from the role after a winless start to the season. Phillips assumed the head coach position on an interim basis, winning her first game in charge 2–1 against London Bees before being permanently appointed to the position the following week. She guided the team to a 6th-place finish in her debut season and finished in second-place in the 2021–22 FA Women's Championship behind Liverpool. Despite sitting at the top of the table midway through the 2022–23 Women's Championship, Phillips resigned as London City Lionesses head coach in January 2023 in order to return to the United States and take an assistant coaching role under Freya Coombe at Angel City FC of the National Women's Soccer League (NWSL).

=== Brighton & Hove Albion ===
In April 2023, Phillips stood down from her role at Angel City FC in order to return to England to join Brighton & Hove Albion, becoming the team's third permanent head coach of the season. She signed a two-and-a-half-year contract until June 2025. The team sat bottom of the Women's Super League at the time of her appointment. Her first game in charge was a 3–2 FA Cup semi-final defeat to Manchester United. Four days later, the team beat Everton 3–2 in the WSL to rise to 10th place. Phillips took seven points from the final eight WSL games of the season and retained their WSL status by finishing five points clear of relegation. On February 1, 2024, Phillips was sacked by Brighton with the team in 10th.

=== Arsenal ===
Following her departure from managing Brighton, in 2024 Phillips was hired as Head of Analysis of Women's Super League side Arsenal, with then-head coach Jonas Eidevall saying of her "I think she combines the coaching background with an analytical background. She has some really strong points in her leadership and how she can lead a department.” She was part of the coaching staff as the club won the 2024–25 UEFA Women's Champions League.

== Coaching statistics ==
All competitive games (league and domestic cups) are included.

As of February 1, 2024

Head coaching record by team and tenure
Team	Nation	From	To	Record							
Team	Nation	From	To	P	W	D	L	GF	GA	GD	Win %
Cal State Bakersfield Roadrunners	United States	March 8, 2011	January 25, 2014	56	13	4	39	42	124	−82	23.21
London City Lionesses	England	October 9, 2020	January 23, 2023	61	31	12	18	92	65	+27	50.82
Brighton & Hove Albion	England	April 7, 2023	February 1, 2024	24	9	3	12	37	45	−8	37.50
Career totals				141	53	19	69	171	234	−63	37.59
