= Park Ye-eun (footballer) =

South Korean footballer

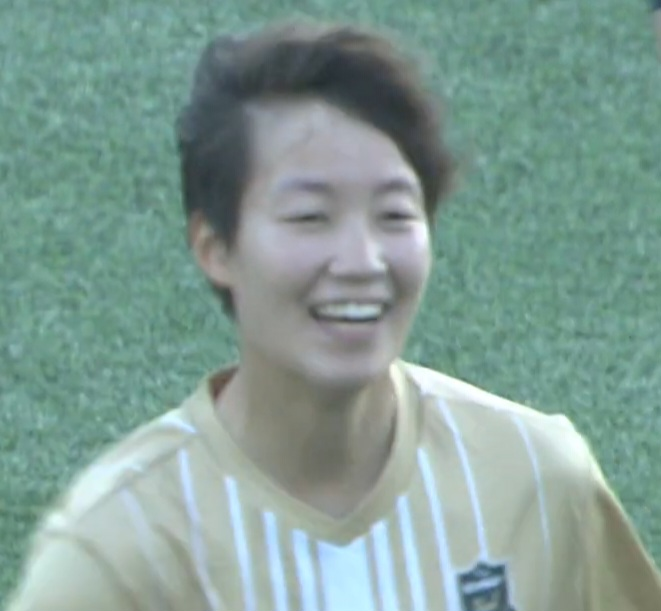

Personal information
- Date of birth: 17 October 1996 (age 30)
- Height: 1.65 m (5 ft 5 in)
- Position: Midfielder

Team information
- Current team: Incheon Hyundai Steel Red Angels WFC
- Number: 16

Senior career*
Years	Team	Apps	(Gls)
2017–2022	Gyeongju KHNP		
2022–2023	Brighton & Hove Albion	4	(0)
2023	Heart of Midlothian	0	(0)
2024-	Incheon Hyundai Steel Red Angels WFC		

International career^{‡}
2014–2016	South Korea U20	15	(1)
2019–	South Korea	16	(4)
- * Club domestic league appearances and goals as of 14 September 2023 ‡ National team caps and goals as of 15 November 2022

Park Ye-eun (Korean: 박예은; born 17 October 1996) is a South Korean footballer who plays as a midfielder for the WK League team Incheon Hyundai Steel Red Angels and the South Korea national team.

== Youth career ==
Park enjoyed playing football with her father and older brother as a young child, and took the sport up seriously in the fifth grade of elementary school after a friend of her parents suggested it. Having started out in the U-12 girls' football academy at Hanam Central Elementary School, she progressed to the U-15 team at Gwangju Gwangsan Middle School. Park moved to Seoul to play for Seoul Dongsan I.C.T. High School before continuing her youth career at Korea University. In 2016, she was named Young Player of the Year by the Korea Football Association.

== Club career ==
Park started her club career with newly established South Korean side Gyeongju Korea Hydro & Nuclear Power WFC. She was chosen by the club as the overall first pick in the 2017 WK League new players draft, and became a core squad member as KHNP repeatedly challenged for the WK League title.

In 2022, Park signed for Brighton & Hove Albion, joining her former Gyeongju teammate Lee Geum-min at the English club. During her only season with Brighton, Park made four appearances, playing only 34 minutes in total.

In September 2023, Park signed for Scottish Women's Premier League side Heart of Midlothian. She scored her first and only goal in Europe for Hearts the following month.

She returned to the WK League ahead of the 2024 season, signing with Incheon Hyundai Steel Red Angels .

== International career ==
Park represented South Korea at the FIFA U-20 Women's World Cup in 2014 and 2016.

Park received her first senior call-up for South Korea in 2015 under manager Yoon Deok-yeo. She scored her first senior international goal in an Olympic qualifying match against Myanmar on 3 February 2020, scoring twice. She was part of the South Korean squad that finished as runners-up in the 2022 AFC Women's Asian Cup.

== Career statistics ==
=== Club ===
As of match played 18 January 2023

Appearances and goals by club, season and competition
Club	Season	League			National cup		League cup		Total	
Club	Season	Division	Apps	Goals	Apps	Goals	Apps	Goals	Apps	Goals
Brighton & Hove Albion	2022–23	WSL	4	0	0	0	3	0	7	0
Heart of Midlothian	2023–24	SWPL 1	0	0	0	0	0	0	0	0
Career total			4	0	0	0	3	0	7	0

=== International ===
As of match played 15 November 2022

Appearances and goals by national team and year
National team	Year	Apps	Goals
South Korea	2019	4	0
South Korea	2020	1	2
South Korea	2021	5	1
South Korea	2022	6	1
Total		16	4

Scores and results list South Korea's goal tally first, score column indicates score after each Park goal.

List of international goals scored by Park Ye-eun
No.	Date	Venue	Opponent	Score	Result	Competition
1	3 February 2020	Jeju World Cup Stadium, Seogwipo, South Korea	Myanmar	4–0	7–0	2020 AFC Women's Olympic Qualifying Tournament
2	3 February 2020	Jeju World Cup Stadium, Seogwipo, South Korea	Myanmar	5–0	7–0	2020 AFC Women's Olympic Qualifying Tournament
3	17 September 2021	Pakhtakor Stadium, Tashkent, Uzbekistan	Mongolia	11–0	12–0	2022 AFC Women's Asian Cup qualification
4	15 November 2022	Orangetheory Stadium, Christchurch, New Zealand	New Zealand	1–1	1–1	Friendly
