= Chelsea Ferguson =

English footballer (born 2004)

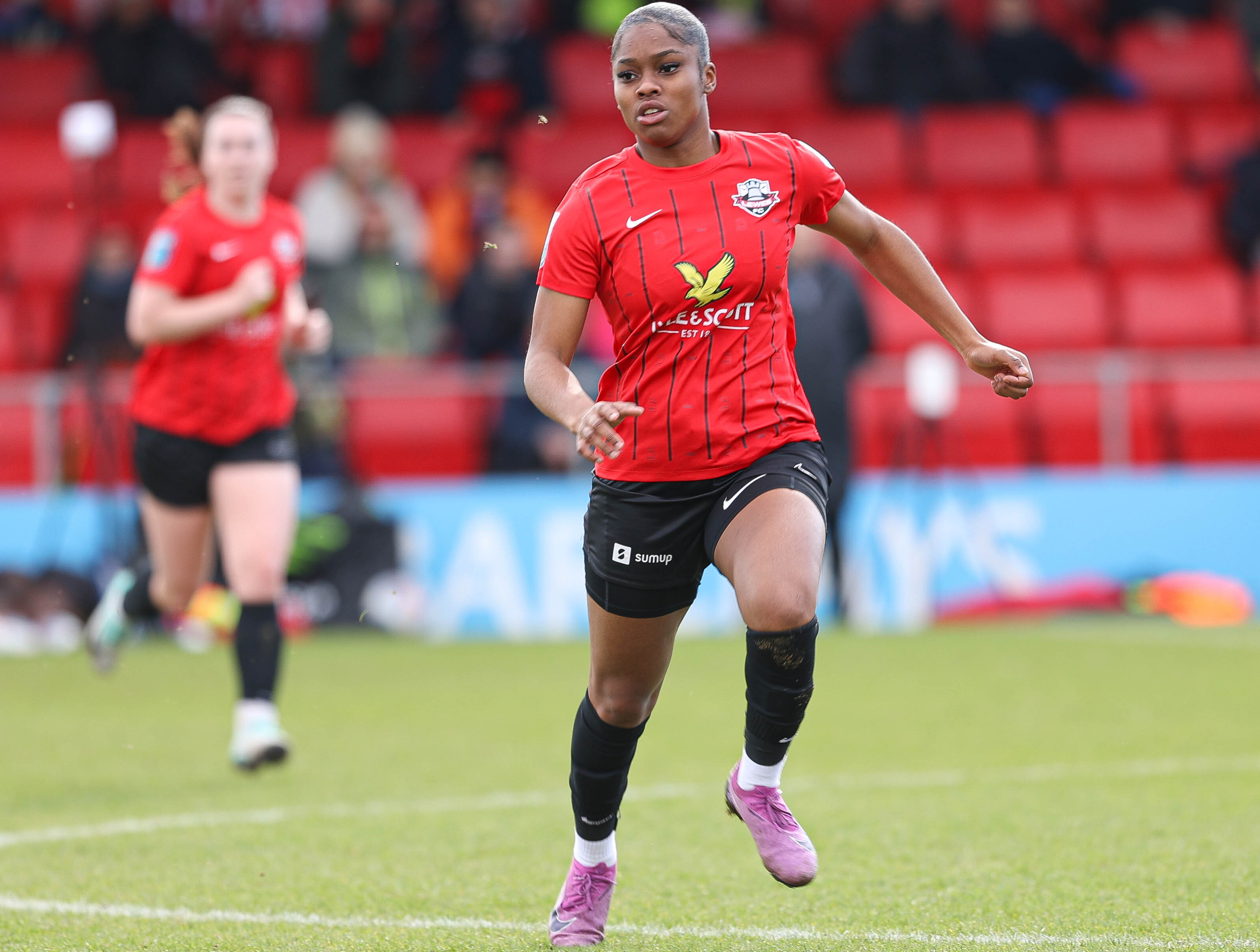
- Ferguson with Lewes in 2024

Personal information
- Full name: Chelsea Ferguson
- Date of birth: 6 November 2004 (age 22)
- Place of birth: England
- Position: Striker

Team information
- Current team: Lewes
- Number: 9

Youth career
- –2020: Millwall
- 2020–2022: Brighton & Hove Albion

Senior career*
Years	Team	Apps	(Gls)
2022–2025	Brighton & Hove Albion	2	(0)
2023–2024	→ Blackburn Rovers (loan)	6	(1)
2024	→ Lewes (loan)	5	(0)
2025–	Lewes	1	(0)
- * Club domestic league appearances and goals as of 19 August 2025

Chelsea Ferguson is an English professional footballer who plays as a forward for FA Women's National League South club Lewes.

== Club career ==
=== Brighton & Hove Albion ===
After joining the Brighton Academy from Millwall at the age of 16, Ferguson made her first senior appearance on 16 September 2022 against Arsenal in a 4–0 away defeat. Ferguson signed her first professional contract with Brighton on 22 July 2023. Ferguson was recalled from her loan to Blackburn Rovers on 8 January 2024.

On 4 June 2025, Ferguson was released following the expiry of her contract.

==== Loan to Blackburn Rovers ====
On 8 September 2023, Ferguson signed for Blackburn Rovers on loan until the end of the season initially, she was then recalled on 8 January 2024. She scored her first senior goal on 12 November 2023, in a 1–0 away win at Sunderland in the Women's Championship.

==== Loan to Lewes ====
On 31 January 2024, Ferguson signed for Lewes on loan until the end of the season.

== Career statistics ==
=== Club ===
As of 21 April 2024.

Appearances and goals by club, season and competition
Club	Season	League			FA Cup		League Cup		Total	
Club	Season	Division	Apps	Goals	Apps	Goals	Apps	Goals	Apps	Goals
Brighton & Hove Albion	2022–23	WSL	2	0	0	0	0	0	2	0
Blackburn Rovers (loan)	2023–24	Women's Championship	6	1	1	0	2	0	9	1
Lewes (loan)	2023–24	Women's Championship	5	0	0	0	0	0	5	0
Career total			13	1	1	0	2	0	16	1
