= Jens Scheuer =

German football manager (born 1978)

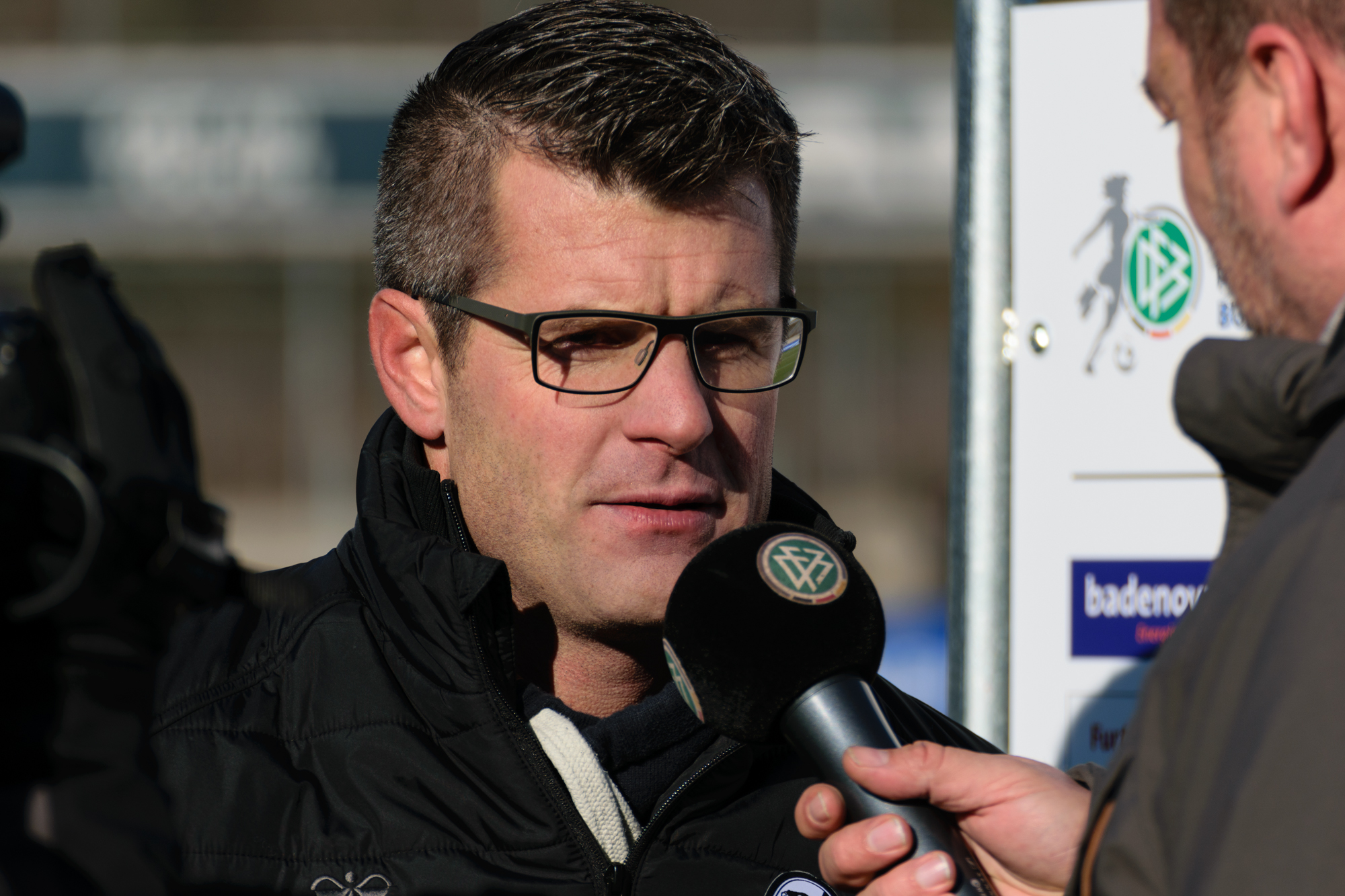
- Scheuer in 2018

Personal information
- Date of birth: 12 October 1978 (age 48)
- Place of birth: Germany
- Height: 1.83 m (6 ft 0 in)
- Position: Defender

Managerial career
- Years: Team
- 2008–2010: FC Bötzingen
- 2010–2012: Bahlinger SC
- 2012–2014: FC Bötzingen
- 2015–2019: SC Freiburg (women)
- 2019–2022: Bayern Munich (women)
- 2022–2023: Brighton & Hove Albion (women)
- 2024: SC Imst

Jens Scheuer (born 12 October 1978) is a German football manager and former player.

== Career ==
In 2015, Scheuer entered women's football management for the first time after he was appointed as head coach of German side SC Freiburg. He was described as "impressed with his refreshing offensive football" while managing the club. In 2019, he moved to another German side Bayern Munich. He helped the club win the league.

In December 2022, Scheuer moved to England after he was named Brighton & Hove Albion new head coach. He was dismissed in March 2023 after failing to secure a win in any of the three Women's Super League matches under his management.

In June 2024, he was appointed as the head coach of the men's team at SC Imst, competing in the Austrian Regionalliga West, the third tier of Austrian football.

== Personal life ==
Scheuer was born in 1978 in Germany. He has played tennis as a hobby.
