= Victoria Williams (footballer) =

Jamaican footballer (born 1990)

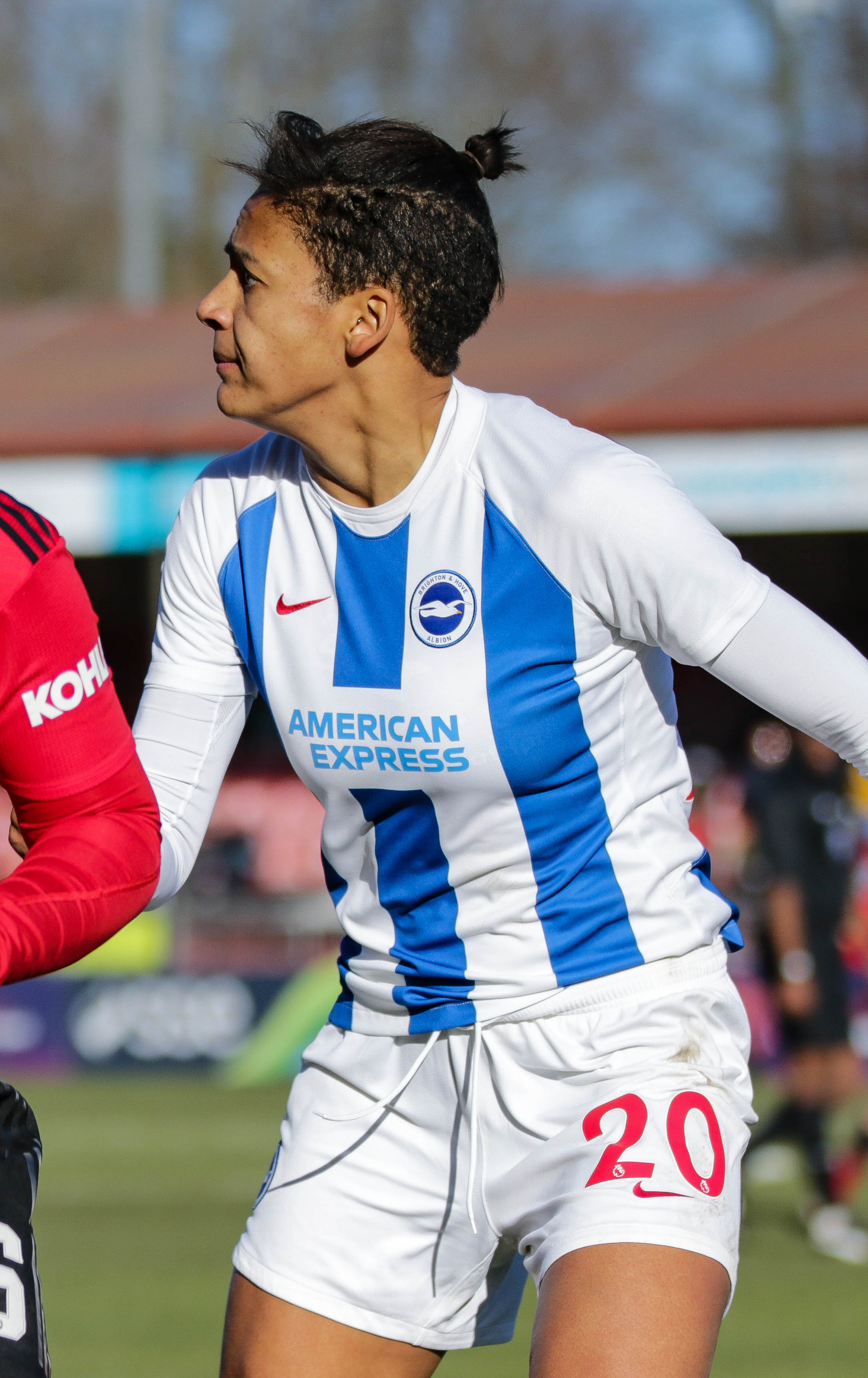
- Williams with Brighton & Hove Albion in 2019

Personal information
- Date of birth: 5 April 1990 (age 36)
- Place of birth: Nottingham, England
- Height: 1.80 m (5 ft 11 in)
- Position: Centre back

Youth career
- 1998–2004: Doncaster Rovers Belles
- 2004–2007: Leeds United
- 2007–2009: Arsenal

Senior career*
Years	Team	Apps	(Gls)
2007	Leeds United	2	(0)
2009–2011	Doncaster Rovers Belles	32	(0)
2012	Chelsea	13	(1)
2013–2014	Doncaster Rovers Belles	29	(4)
2015–2018	Sunderland	59	(5)
2018–2023	Brighton & Hove Albion	31	(2)

International career^{‡}
2023–	Jamaica	1	(0)
Medal record
Women's football
Representing Great Britain
Summer Universiade
Gold medal – first place	2013 Kazan	Team
- * Club domestic league appearances and goals as of 01:00, 25 July 2019 (UTC) ‡ National team caps and goals as of 16 February 2023

Victoria Williams (born 5 April 1990) is a professional footballer who plays as a centre back. She last played for Women's Super League club Brighton & Hove Albion. Born and raised in England, she is a member of the Jamaica women's national team.

Williams joined Doncaster Rovers Belles as an eight-year-old, and returned to the club in 2009 after spells with Leeds United and Arsenal. In July 2013, she helped Great Britain to secure a gold medal at the 2013 Summer Universiade in Kazan, Russia.

== Career ==
=== Brighton & Hove Albion ===
On 20 May 2021, Brighton announced Williams had signed a contract extension with the club.

On 5 May 2023, Brighton reported that Williams, and four other players, would leave when their contracts expire in June.
