= 2019–20 Women's FA Cup =

Tournament details
- Country: England; Wales
- Teams: 300

Final positions
- Champions: Manchester City (3rd title)
- Runners-up: Everton

Tournament statistics
- Matches played: 295
- Goals scored: 1,516 (5.14 per match)

The 2019–20 Women's FA Cup was the 50th staging of the Women's FA Cup, a knockout cup competition for women's football teams in England. Manchester City were the defending champions, having beaten West Ham United 3–0 in the previous final. The draw was split regionally, dividing teams into north and south sections until the fourth round proper.

== Teams ==
A total of 300 teams had their entries to the tournament accepted by The Football Association. 216 teams enter at the extra preliminary round or preliminary round. Teams that play in the FA Women's National League Division One are given exemption to the second round qualifying, while teams in the Northern and Southern Premier Divisions enter at the second round proper. Teams in the FA Women's Super League and FA Women's Championship are exempted to the fourth round proper.

Round	Clubs remaining	Clubs involved	Winners from previous round	Games played	Goals scored	Prize money	
Round	Clubs remaining	Clubs involved	Winners from previous round	Games played	Goals scored	Winner	Loser
Extra preliminary round	300	20	–	9	65	£300	£75
Preliminary round	290	196	10	95	579	£360	£90
First round qualifying	192	98	98	49	241	£400	£100
Second round qualifying	143	96 (Note: FA Women's National League Division One teams added)	49	48	240	£450	£115
Third round qualifying	95	48	48	24	122	£600	£150
First round	71	24	24	12	50	£850	£215
Second round	59	36 (Note: FA Women's National League Premier Division teams added)	12	18	71	£1,000	£250
Third round	41	18	18	9	32	£1,250	£315
Fourth round	32	32 (Note: FA Women's Championship and FA WSL teams added)	9	16	62	£2,000	£500
Fifth round	16	16	16	8	30	£3,000	£750
Quarter-final	8	8	8	4	14	£4,000	£1,000
Semi-final	4	4	4	2	6	£5,000	£1,250
Final	2	2	2	1	4	£25,000	£15,000

== Extra preliminary round ==
As a result of 300 teams entering the competition, twenty teams were drawn into an extra preliminary round, which was played by Sunday 18 August 2019.

Tie	Home team (tier)	Score	Away team (tier)	Att.
1	Washington (6)	0–13	Redcar Town (5)	
2	Wakefield Trinity (6)	0–3	Farsley Celtic (5)	
3	Mossley Hill (5)	H–W	Burnley Belvedere (7)	
Burnley Belvedere withdrew.
4	Notts County (6)	11–1	Cleethorpes Town (6)	52
5	Port Vale (6)	9–0	Lye Town (5)	57
6	Corby Town (6)	1–2	Bungay Town (7)	42
7	New London Lionesses (6)	5–4	Comets (7)	
8	Bishop's Stortford (6)	1–5	Hartham United (7)	
9	Ashford Town (Middx) (5)	4–1	Denham United (5)	
10	Burgess Hill Town (7)	3–2	Eastbourne United (6)	

== Preliminary round ==
Ninety eight matches were scheduled for the preliminary round, which were played by Sunday 1 September 2019. The 196 teams taking part consisted of 186 teams with a bye to this stage, plus the ten match winners from the previous round. Sedgley & Gornal United and Boston United both withdrew after having their entry accepted which resulted in walkover wins for Droitwich Spa and Loughborough Students respectively. The match between Whyteleafe and Millwall Lionesses was played, ending in a 6–3 victory for Millwall, but Whyteleafe were later awarded the win because Millwall had fielded two unregistered players.

Tie	Home team (tier)	Score	Away team (tier)	Att.
1	Penrith (6)	2–4	Bishop Auckland (7)	
2	Boro Rangers (6)	1–3	South Shields (5)	
3	Carlisle United (6)	1–11	Hartlepool United (5)	
4	Redcar Town (5)	5–0	Lumley (6)	
5	Blyth Town (6)	2–1	Workington Reds (6)	
6	Alnwick Town (6)	3–5	Sunderland West End (6)	
7	Wetherby Athletic (7)	0–10	Harrogate Town (5)	
8	Ossett United (5)	5–1	Rotherham United (5)	93
9	Ripon City (7)	0–4	Yorkshire Amateur (7)	
10	Bridlington Rovers (6)	4–2	Bradford Park Avenue (6)	
11	Hepworth United (6)	5–1	Pride Park (7)	
12	Farsley Celtic (5)	3–0	Thackley (7)	
13	Oughtbridge WM (5)	2–1	Sheffield Wednesday (6)	107
14	Blackburn Community (6)	6–1	West Kirby (6)	
15	Northwich Vixens (6)	13–2	Bury (5)	
16	Curzon Ashton (6)	2–2 (2–4 p)	Mossley Hill (5)	
17	Thameside United (7)	1–5	Fleetwood Town Wrens (5)	
18	Manchester Stingers (5)	0–6	Merseyrail (5)	
19	FC United of Manchester (5)	5–0	Tranmere Rovers (5)	92
20	Accrington Girls & Ladies (6)	1–3	Altrincham (6)	
21	Didsbury (6)	4–2	West Didsbury & Chorlton (5)	
22	Accrington Stanley Community (6)	1–8	Morecambe (5)	
23	Wythenshawe Amateurs (6)	0–8	Crewe Alexandra (5)	
24	Boston United (5)	A–W	Loughborough Students (5)	
Boston United withdrawn.
25	AFC Leicester (7)	1–3	Grimsby Borough (6)	
26	Rise Park (5)	3–2 (a.e.t.)	Notts County (6)	
27	Coalville Town (7)	1–11	Hykeham Town (6)	
28	Worksop Town (6)	0–9	Mansfield Town (5)	
29	Dronfield Town (7)	1–2	Leicester City Ladies (5)	
30	Lutterworth Athletic (6)	0–12	Chesterfield (6)	
31	Sherwood (7)	0–7	Arnold Eagles (6)	27
32	Oadby & Wigston (6)	5–1	Lincoln Moorlands Railway (6)	
33	Arnold Town (6)	1–4	Woodlands (5)	
34	Kidderminster Harriers (6)	3–4	Leek Town (5)	
35	Port Vale (6)	8–1	Knowle (5)	59
36	Droitwich Spa (6)	H–W	Sedgley & Gornal United (6)	
Sedgley & Gornal United withdrawn.
37	Solihull Sporting (6)	7–1	Rugby Town (6)	50
38	Crusaders (5)	5–2	Sandwell (6)	
39	Tamworth (7)	2–3	Shrewsbury Town (6)	
40	Kingfisher (6)	2–4	Cookley Sports (6)	
41	Kidsgrove Athletic (5)	3–5	Solihull Ladies United (5)	
42	Coundon Court (5)	2–3	Sutton Coldfield Town (6)	
43	Wyrley (6)	2–4	Shifnal Town (6)	
44	Stockingford AA Pavilion (5)	2–1	Stourbridge (6)	216
45	Coventry Sphinx (5)	2–1 (a.e.t.)	AFC Telford United (6)	
46	Wroxham (5)	6–2	Kettering Town (5)	65
47	Haverhill Rovers (7)	1–3	King's Lynn Town (6)	

Tie	Home team (tier)	Score	Away team (tier)	Att.
48	St Ives Town (5)	0–1	Histon (6)	
49	AFC Sudbury (6)	0–8	Harlow Town (5)	
50	Riverside (7)	0–15	Bungay Town (7)	
51	Peterborough United (5)	14–0	Thrapston Town (6)	
52	Fulbourn Institute Bluebirds (7)	0–5	Wymondham Town (5)	
53	Netherton United (7)	1–3	Newmarket Town (6)	
54	Clapton Community (7)	6–3	Margate (7)	310
55	Aylesford (5)	2–1 (a.e.t.)	Dulwich Hamlet (5)	
56	Fulham (5)	3–1	New London Lionesses (6)	
57	Dartford (5)	5–0	Hackney (6)	130
58	Whyteleafe (5)	H–W	Millwall Lionesses (6)	
Millwall won 6–3 but later disqualified for breach of competition rules.
59	Victoire (6)	4–3 (a.e.t.)	Herne Bay (6)	
60	Meridian (7)	1–3	Regents Park Rangers (7)	40
61	Sutton United (6)	0–1	Islington Borough (7)	
62	Phoenix Sports (6)	5–1	Haringey Borough (5)	
63	Long Lane (7)	0–11	Ashford (6)	
64	Watford Ladies Development (6)	4–2	Hemel Hempstead Town (7)	
65	Hitchin Belles (7)	1–6	Bowers & Pitsea (5)	
66	Royston Town (5)	4–1	Wodson Park (6)	85
67	Bedford (5)	1–3	Colney Heath (5)	
68	Houghton Athletic (7)	0–1	AFC Dunstable (5)	
69	Hartham United (7)	0–5	St Albans (7)	
70	Luton Town (5)	7–0	Leigh Ramblers (6)	
71	Abbey Rangers (6)	4–3 (a.e.t.)	Hampton & Richmond Borough (7)	
72	Queens Park Rangers Development (5)	11–0	Wargrave (7)	
73	Banbury United (7)	1–2	Walton Casuals (7)	
74	Abingdon United (5)	7–0	Brentford (7)	108
75	Ascot United (5)	2–3	Abingdon Town (6)	
76	Ashford Town (Middx) (5)	5–2	Oxford City (5)	
77	Wantage Town (7)	0–14	Wycombe Wanderers (5)	
78	Steyning Town (7)	1–5	Newhaven (6)	
79	Oakwood (7)	6–1	AFC Littlehampton (7)	
80	Pagham (7)	2–3	Worthing (6)	
81	Godalming Town (6)	1–2	Eastbourne Town (5)	
82	Milford & Witley (7)	1–5	Tunbridge Wells Foresters (7)	
83	Burgess Hill Town (7)	2–4 (a.e.t.)	Saltdean United (5)	
84	Mole Valley (7)	7–0	Bexhill United (7)	
85	New Milton Town (6)	3–1	Newbury (5)	50
86	Shanklin (7)	1–0	Alton (6)	37
87	Bournemouth Sports (6)	1–3 (a.e.t.)	Winchester City Flyers (5)	
88	Eastleigh (6)	1–2	Moneyfields (5)	
89	AFC Bournemouth (5)	6–0	Feniton (6)	
90	Almondsbury (6)	2–0	Longlevens (7)	
91	Weston Super Mare (6)	1–4	Middlezoy Rovers (5)	
92	AEK Boco (6)	0–4	Ilminster Town (5)	
93	Sherborne Town (6)	10–0	Keynsham Town Development (5)	
94	Royal Wootton Bassett Town (5)	7–0	Chipping Sodbury Town (6)	
95	Swindon Spitfires (6)	1–7	Portishead Town (5)	51
96	Bideford (5)	5–2	St Agnes (6)	
97	Marine Academy Plymouth (5)	1–0 (a.e.t.)	AFC St Austell (7)	
98	Torquay United (5)	3–0	RNAS Culdrose (7)	

== First round qualifying ==
Forty-nine matches were scheduled for the first round qualifying, the majority of which were played on Sunday 22 September 2019. Morecambe's tie against FC United of Manchester was postponed on this date, as was the re-arranged fixture a week later, leading to the tie being reversed and Morecambe losing their home advantage. Worthing's tie against Whyteleafe was played on 29 September, having been delayed a week due to Millwall Lionesses (who had been due to play in this match) being expelled from the competition. The round was made up solely of the winners from the previous round and did not include the introduction of any new teams.

Tie	Home team (tier)	Score	Away team (tier)	Att.
1	Harrogate Town (5)	5–0	Fleetwood Town Wrens (5)	
2	Redcar Town (5)	2–0	Bishop Auckland (7)	
3	Yorkshire Amateur (7)	0–5	Hartlepool United (5)	
4	FC United of Manchester (5)	4–1	Morecambe (5)	78
Tie reversed after two postponements at Morecambe.
5	Altrincham (6)	4–2	Didsbury (6)	53
6	Hepworth United (6)	1–8	Blackburn Community (6)	
7	Farsley Celtic (5)	2–1	Merseyrail (5)	
8	Bridlington Rovers (6)	0–7	Ossett United (5)	
9	Sunderland West End (6)	4–4 (4–5 p)	Mossley Hill (5)	
10	Blyth Town (6)	0–1	South Shields (5)	
11	Droitwich Spa (6)	0–3	Shifnal Town (6)	
12	Stockingford AA Pavilion (5)	1–5	Coventry Sphinx (5)	72
13	Shrewsbury Town (6)	1–3	Leek Town (5)	
14	Sutton Coldfield Town (6)	5–0	Solihull Sporting (6)	
15	Arnold Eagles (6)	2–3	Northwich Vixens (6)	
16	Oadby & Wigston (6)	2–3	Crewe Alexandra (5)	60
17	Chesterfield (6)	2–0	Cookley Sports (6)	
18	Peterborough United (5)	3–0	Oughtbridge WM (5)	
19	Woodlands (5)	2–1	Hykeham Town (6)	
20	Rise Park (5)	3–2	Grimsby Borough (6)	
21	Leicester City Ladies (5)	3–2 (a.e.t.)	Port Vale (6)	40
22	Solihull Ladies United (5)	2–1	Loughborough Students (5)	
23	Mansfield Town (5)	4–2	Crusaders (5)	
24	Harlow Town (5)	3–1	King's Lynn Town (6)	
25	Watford Ladies Development (6)	0–2	Newmarket Town (6)	
26	Histon (6)	0–4	St Albans (7)	
27	Colney Heath (5)	2–5	Royston Town (5)	

Tie	Home team (tier)	Score	Away team (tier)	Att.
28	AFC Dunstable (5)	2–2 (2–3 p)	Bowers & Pitsea (5)	
29	Luton Town (5)	6–0	Bungay Town (7)	64
30	Wroxham (5)	3–2	Wymondham Town (5)	108
31	Victoire (6)	0–4	Islington Borough (7)	
32	Clapton Community (7)	2–3	Oakwood (7)	
33	Fulham (5)	5–1	Mole Valley (7)	
34	Ashford (6)	4–1	Eastbourne Town (5)	30
35	Dartford (5)	4–0	Newhaven (6)	143
36	Regents Park Rangers (7)	0–3	Wycombe Wanderers (5)	
37	Queens Park Rangers Development (5)	8–0	Abbey Rangers (6)	
38	Whyteleafe (5)	0–1	Worthing (6)	
39	Abingdon United (5)	2–1	Aylesford (5)	87
40	Tunbridge Wells Foresters (7)	1–4	Phoenix Sports (6)	
41	Abingdon Town (6)	4–3	Walton Casuals (7)	
42	Ashford Town (Middx) (5)	0–1	Saltdean United (5)	
43	Shanklin (7)	0–12	Sherborne Town (6)	
44	AFC Bournemouth (5)	10–0	New Milton Town (6)	
45	Royal Wootton Bassett Town (5)	8–0	Torquay United (5)	
46	Marine Academy Plymouth (5)	1–0	Almondsbury (6)	
47	Portishead Town (5)	3–1 (a.e.t.)	Middlezoy Rovers (5)	
48	Winchester City Flyers (5)	9–2	Bideford (5)	60
49	Ilminster Town (5)	1–4	Moneyfields (5)	

== Second round qualifying ==
Forty-eight matches in the second round qualifying were played on Sunday 6 October 2019. The round was made up of the 49 winners from the previous round and the introduction of all 47 FA Women's National League Division One teams.

Tie	Home team (tier)	Score	Away team (tier)	Att.
1	Hartlepool United (5)	4–3	Blackburn Community (6)	
2	Bolton Wanderers (4)	1–2	Newcastle United (4)	
3	Redcar Town (5)	1–3	Norton & Stockton Ancients (4)	
4	Harrogate Town (5)	0–2	Chorley (4)	
5	FC United of Manchester (5)	1–5	Brighouse Town (4)	93
6	Barnsley (4)	5–1	Bradford City (4)	
7	Chester-le-Street Town (4)	4–2	Doncaster Rovers Belles (4)	
8	Leeds United (4)	4–1	South Shields (5)	50
9	Mossley Hill (5)	1–3	Stockport County (4)	30
10	Durham Cestria (4)	5–1	Ossett United (5)	
11	Farsley Celtic (5)	1–4	Liverpool Feds (4)	
12	Burton Albion (4)	0–3	Leicester United (4)	
13	Woodlands (5)	2–1	Rise Park (5)	
14	Mansfield Town (5)	0–6	Birmingham & West Midlands (4)	
15	Leek Town (5)	6–0	Leicester City Ladies (5)	
16	Wolverhampton Wanderers (4)	10–0	Shifnal Town (6)	140
17	Lincoln City (4)	7–0	Solihull Moors (4)	
18	Chesterfield (6)	1–3	Bedworth United (4)	
19	Altrincham (6)	1–5	Northwich Vixens (6)	64
Tie reversed after two postponements at Northwich.
20	Leafield Athletic (4)	2–5	Sporting Khalsa (4)	94
21	Sutton Coldfield Town (6)	3–2	Solihull Ladies United (5)	
22	Coventry Sphinx (5)	0–5	Crewe Alexandra (5)	
23	The New Saints (4)	6–1	Long Eaton United (4)	
24	Stevenage (4)	1–2	Peterborough United (5)	111

Tie	Home team (tier)	Score	Away team (tier)	Att.
25	Newmarket Town (6)	0–4	Luton Town (5)	
26	Harlow Town (5)	4–3 (a.e.t.)	Wroxham (5)	
27	Norwich City (4)	3–2	Cambridge United (4)	
28	Cambridge City (4)	4–3	St Albans (7)	130
29	Ipswich Town (4)	7–0	Royston Town (5)	
30	Wycombe Wanderers (5)	3–1	Worthing (6)	
31	Kent Football United (4)	1–3	Actonians (4)	
32	Dartford (5)	0–7	Billericay Town (4)	118
33	Ashford (6)	0–7	AFC Wimbledon (4)	
34	Queens Park Rangers Development (5)	9–1	Oakwood (7)	
35	Enfield Town (4)	4–0	Islington Borough (7)	
36	Maidenhead United (4)	1–2	Bowers & Pitsea (5)	
37	Fulham (5)	1–1 (3–0 p)	Saltdean United (5)	50
38	Abingdon Town (6)	0–4	Chesham United (4)	
39	AFC Basildon (4)	8–2	Phoenix Sports (6)	
40	Abingdon United (5)	1–4	Leyton Orient (4)	
41	Exeter City (4)	7–1	Sherborne Town (6)	58
42	Portishead Town (5)	1–0	Royal Wootton Bassett Town (5)	
43	Winchester City Flyers (5)	2–3	Poole Town (4)	
44	Marine Academy Plymouth (5)	0–2	Southampton Women (4)	
45	Southampton (4)	8–0	Buckland Athletic (4)	148
46	Moneyfields (5)	2–2 (4–2 p)	Larkhall Athletic (4)	73
47	Cheltenham Town (4)	5–0	Brislington (4)	
48	Swindon Town (4)	2–3	AFC Bournemouth (5)	

== Third round qualifying ==
Twenty-four matches were scheduled for the second round qualifying, played on Sunday 27 October 2019. The round was made up of the 48 winners from the previous round and did not include the introduction of any new teams. A total of five games were delayed by weather and were rescheduled for Sunday 3 November.

Tie	Home team (tier)	Score	Away team (tier)	Att.
1	Northwich Vixens (6)	2–7	Liverpool Feds (4)	
2	Leeds United (4)	0–3	Barnsley (4)	130
3	Chester-le-Street Town (4)	3–1	Newcastle United (4)	
4	Hartlepool United (5)	0–8	Chorley (4)	
5	Norton & Stockton Ancients (4)	2–6	Durham Cestria (4)	60
6	Stockport County (4)	2–2 (2–4 p)	Brighouse Town (4)	46
7	Peterborough United (5)	2–3	The New Saints (4)	
8	Sporting Khalsa (4)	1–3	Lincoln City (4)	
9	Bedworth United (4)	2–4	Woodlands (5)	45
10	Leicester United (4)	0–1	Leek Town (5)	
11	Birmingham & West Midlands (4)	1–2	Crewe Alexandra (5)	
12	Sutton Coldfield Town (6)	1–5	Wolverhampton Wanderers (4)	

Tie	Home team (tier)	Score	Away team (tier)	Att.
13	Harlow Town (5)	1–2	Billericay Town (4)	
14	Cambridge City (4)	3–7	AFC Basildon (4)	73
15	Ipswich Town (4)	6–1	Norwich City (4)	
16	Bowers & Pitsea (5)	0–3	Luton Town (5)	
17	Actonians (4)	3–1	Fulham (5)	
18	Queens Park Rangers Development (5)	1–2	Leyton Orient (4)	
19	Enfield Town (4)	1–2	AFC Wimbledon (4)	
20	Chesham United (4)	3–0	Wycombe Wanderers (5)	
21	Portishead Town (5)	1–1 (3–1 p)	Moneyfields (5)	53
22	Southampton Women (4)	3–1	AFC Bournemouth (5)	
23	Southampton (4)	11–0	Poole Town (4)	213
24	Cheltenham Town (4)	4–3	Exeter City (4)	

== First round proper ==
Twelve matches were scheduled for the first round proper, played on Sunday 10 November 2019. The round was made up of the 24 winners from the previous round and did not include the introduction of any new teams.

Number of teams per tier still in competition
Super League	Championship	Premier Division	Division One	Regional & County	Total
12 / 12	11 / 11	24 / 24	19 / 19	5 / 5	71 / 71

10 November 2019	Actonians (4)	2–1	AFC Wimbledon (4)	Northolt
	Barreca 17'; Byrne 40'	Report	Billingham 20'	Stadium: Rectory Park

10 November 2019	Chesham United (4)	0–1	Southampton (4)	Chesham
		Report	Pusey 11'	Stadium: The Meadow

10 November 2019	Crewe Alexandra (5)	1–2 (a.e.t.)	Barnsley (4)
	Fallon 44'	Report	Woodruff 86'; Bartup 118'

10 November 2019	Durham Cestria (4)	1–3	Chester Le Street Town (4)	Durham
	Knowles 25'	Report	Havery 15', 45+1'; Hockaday 80'	Stadium: Durham University

10 November 2019	Ipswich Town (4)	5–0	AFC Basildon (4)	Felixstowe
	Peake 16'; Peskett 33'; Thomas 45'; Lafayette 83'; Gibbons 88'	Report		Stadium: The Goldstar ground

10 November 2019	Leek Town (5)	1–2 (a.e.t.)	Lincoln City (4)	Leek
	Goal	Report	Blinkhorn 70'; Murrell 97'	Stadium: Harrison Park

10 November 2019	Liverpool Marshall Feds (4)	0–4	Brighouse Town (4)	Aigburth
		Report	Freibach 9', 53', 64'; Dobson 87'	Stadium: Jericho Lane

10 November 2019	Southampton Women (4)	4–0	Portishead Town (5)
	Bloomfield 31', 47', 78'; Yeates 51'	Report

10 November 2019	The New Saints (4)	0–4	Chorley (4)
		Report	Kemp 14'; Donoghue 39', 80'; Mills 65'

10 November 2019	Wolverhampton Wanderers (4)	4–1	Luton Town (5)	Castlecroft
	Jennings 7'; Walker 22'; Glover 60'; Bramford 72'	Report	McKay 75'	Stadium: CKW Stadium; Attendance: 90; Referee: T Lloyd

17 November 2019	Cheltenham Town (4)	0–1	Leyton Orient (4)
		Report	Stenning 61'

17 November 2019	Woodlands (5)	0–13	Billericay Town (4)
		Report	Addison; Blackie; Jones; Lancaster; Morgan; Rushen; Smith

== Second round proper ==
Eighteen matches were scheduled for the second round proper, to be played on Sunday 1 December 2019. The round was made up of the 12 winners from the previous round as well as the introduction of all 24 third tier clubs from the FA Women's National League Northern and Southern Premier Divisions.

Number of teams per tier still in competition
Super League	Championship	Premier Division	Division One	Regional & County	Total
12 / 12	11 / 11	24 / 24	12 / 19	0 / 5	59 / 71

1 December 2019	Actonians (4)	3–1	Crawley Wasps (3)	Northolt
	Barreca 17', 47'; D'Santos 82'	Report	Cole 45'	Stadium: Rectory Park

1 December 2019	Barnsley (4)	4–0	Sheffield (3)	Barnsley
	Bartup 16', 80', 83'; Smith 23'	Report		Stadium: Barnsley Academy; Attendance: 302

1 December 2019	Billericay Town (4)	2–1	Gillingham (3)	Aveley
	Addison; Morgan	Report	Bussey 30'	Stadium: Parkside

1 December 2019	Chichester City (3)	0–6	Ipswich Town (4)	Selsey
		Report	Cooper 9'; Peake 28'; Thomas 36', 90'; Crump 44'; Peskett 54'	Stadium: The High Street Ground; Attendance: 116

1 December 2019	Derby County (3)	2–3	Nottingham Forest (3)	Mickleover
	Sims 26'; Domingo 48'	Report	Cook 6'; Harkin 16'; Hamilton 86'	Stadium: Station Road

1 December 2019	Hounslow (3)	0–6	Cardiff City (3)	Yiewsley
		Report	Williams 54', 57', 62', 69'; Longhurst 80'	Stadium: Honeycroft; Attendance: 15

1 December 2019	Keynsham Town (3)	0–3	Watford (3)	Keynsham
		Report	O'Leary 63'; Carid 65'; Stojko-Down 90'	Stadium: Crown Field

1 December 2019	Oxford United (3)	3–4 (a.e.t.)	Plymouth Argyle (3)	Marston
	Timms 72'; Sims 78', 99'	Report	Bleazard 14', 107'; Knapman 18'; Lane 119'	Stadium: Marsh Lane

1 December 2019	Southampton Women (4)	1–1 (a.e.t.) (3–2 p)	Milton Keynes Dons (3)	Romsey
	Cheshire 120+1'	Report	Netschova 102'	Stadium: The AEC Protection Ground; Attendance: 58
	Penalties
	Penalty missed Penalty scored		Penalty missed Penalty scored

1 December 2019	Wolverhampton Wanderers (4)	0–1	AFC Fylde (3)	Wolverhampton
		Report	Hollinshead 3'	Stadium: Castlecroft Stadium; Attendance: 75; Referee: A Hall

1 December 2019	Yeovil Town (3)	1–1 (a.e.t.) (4–5 p)	Southampton (4)	Dorchester
	Heatherson 90'	Report	Ware 58'	Stadium: The Avenue Stadium
	Penalties
	Penalty scored Penalty missed		(penalty scored) Morris; (penalty scored) Morris; (penalty scored) Sievwright; (penalty scored) Albuery; (penalty scored) Panting

8 December 2019	Burnley (3)	2–1	Hull City (3)	Padiham
	Greenhalgh 43', 87'	Report	Skinner 19'	Stadium: Arbories Memorial Sports Ground; Attendance: 62

8 December 2019	Chester Le Street Town (4)	0–4	Loughborough Foxes (3)	Chester-le-Street
		Report	Renken 25', 33', 87'; Stanley 48'	Stadium: Moor Park; Attendance: 40

8 December 2019	Chorley (4)	1–2 (a.e.t.)	Brighouse Town (4)	Chorley
	Vella 9'	Report	Freibach 58'; Wild 95'	Stadium: Victory Park; Attendance: 48

8 December 2019	Portsmouth (3)	6–1	Leyton Orient (4)	Portsmouth
	Bath 28', 35'; De Bunsen 38', 66'; Ingram 43'; Younger 87'	Report	McCann 7'	Stadium: Kendall Stadium; Attendance: 137

8 December 2019	Stoke City (3)	1–1 (a.e.t.) (3–4 p)	Huddersfield Town (3)	Smallthorne
	Bowyer 83'	Report	Elford 17'	Stadium: Norton Sports Community Sports Facility
	Penalties
	Gibson (penalty scored); Hughes (penalty missed); Brough (penalty scored); McCoy (penalty scored); Baptiste (penalty missed)		(penalty scored) Mallin; (penalty scored) Danby; (penalty scored) White; (penalty missed) Stanfield; (penalty scored) Nutter

8 December 2019	Sunderland (3)	4–3	Middlesbrough (3)	Hebburn
	Galloway 24', 69'; Wareham 39' (o.g.); Watt 51'	Report	Dobson 9'; Dodds 41'; Scarr 64'	Stadium: Hebburn Sports & Social Ground; Attendance: 190

8 December 2019	West Bromwich Albion (3)	2–0	Lincoln City (4)	Walsall Wood
	H. James 28'; Davies 90+5'	Report		Stadium: John Sylvester Stadium

== Third round proper ==
Nine matches were scheduled for the third round proper, which were played on Sundays 5 and 12 January 2020. The round was made up of the 18 winners from the previous round and did not include the introduction of any new teams.

Number of teams per tier still in competition
Super League	Championship	Premier Division	Division One	Regional & County	Total
12 / 12	11 / 11	11 / 24	7 / 19	0 / 5	41 / 71

5 January 2020	Brighouse Town (4)	0–1	Barnsley (4)	Brighouse
		Report	K. Smith 25'	Stadium: St Giles Road; Attendance: 321

5 January 2020	Burnley (3)	2–1	Nottingham Forest (3)	Padiham
	Agger 77'; Worthington 84'	Report	Fisher 63'	Stadium: Arbories Memorial Sports Ground; Attendance: 138

5 January 2020	Cardiff City (3)	1–2	Southampton (4)	Ystrad Mynach
	Turner 9'	Report	Pusey 17'; Whitton 48'	Stadium: CCB Centre for Sporting Excellence; Attendance: 215

5 January 2020	Ipswich Town (4)	1–0	Portsmouth (3)	Felixstowe
	Peake 38'	Report		Stadium: The Goldstar Ground; Attendance: 368

5 January 2020	Loughborough Foxes (3)	2–3	Huddersfield Town (3)	Loughborough
	McGrother 26', 44'	Report	Sowerby 66'; White 77'; Mallin 79'	Stadium: The Loughborough University Stadium; Attendance: 57

5 January 2020	Southampton Women (4)	3–1	West Bromwich Albion (3)	Romsey
	Bloomfield 34', 63'; Yeates 71'	Report	Greaves	Stadium: The AEC Protection Ground; Attendance: 79

5 January 2020	Watford (3)	5–0	Plymouth Argyle (3)	Kings Langley
	O'Leary 29', 36', 48'; Ward 90+5'; Scanlon 90+7'	Report		Stadium: Gaywood Park

12 January 2020	Billericay Town (4)	3–2	Actonians (4)	Aveley
	Rodney 10'; Addison 78' (pen.); L. Morgan 90+3'	Report	Barreca 66', 76'	Stadium: Parkside; Attendance: 86

12 January 2020	AFC Fylde (3)	1–4	Sunderland (3)	Skelmersdale
	Carroll 38'	Report	Brown 36', 66'; Farrugia 45'; Galloway 63'	Stadium: JMO Sports Park

== Fourth round proper ==
16 matches were scheduled for the fourth round proper. The Manchester derby was selected as the televised game for the round and moved to Saturday 25 January 2020 with the rest played on Sunday 26 January 2020. Southampton Women vs Crystal Palace was abandoned in the 78th minute due to adverse weather conditions and was replayed on Sunday 2 February 2020. The 32 teams taking part consisted of 12 FA Women's Super League and 11 FA Women's Championship teams exempted to this stage, plus the nine match winners from the previous round.

Number of teams per tier still in competition
Super League	Championship	Premier Division	Division One	Regional & County	Total
12 / 12	11 / 11	4 / 24	5 / 19	0 / 5	32 / 71

25 January 2020	Manchester United (1)	2–3	Manchester City (1)	Leigh
	L. James 69'; Hemp 88' (o.g.)	Report	White 29', 56'; J. Scott 76'	Stadium: Leigh Sports Village; Attendance: 1,948; Referee: Micahel Barlow

26 January 2020	Aston Villa (2)	2–3	Brighton & Hove Albion (1)	Boldmere
	Hayles 14', 81'	Report	Umotong 11'; Nildén 30'; Whelan 35'	Stadium: Boldmere Community Stadium

26 January 2020	Bristol City (1)	1–0 (a.e.t.)	Durham (2)	Filton
	Robinson 103'	Report		Stadium: Stoke Gifford Stadium

26 January 2020	Burnley (3)	1–3	Leicester City (2)	Padiham
	Cooper 75'	Report	Paul 47'; Blanchard 50'; Bailey-Gayle 61'	Stadium: Arbories Memorial Sports Ground; Attendance: 218

26 January 2020	Charlton Athletic (2)	0–4	Chelsea (1)	Crayford
		Report	Spence 45', 57'; Murphy 46', 84'	Stadium: The Oakwood; Attendance: 844; Referee: Robert Massey-Ellis

26 January 2020	Everton (1)	1–0	London Bees (2)	Blowick
	Kaagman 45'	Report		Stadium: Haig Avenue

26 January 2020	Huddersfield Town (3)	1–4	Ipswich Town (4)	Huddersfield
	Elford 50'	Report	Biggs 2', 10', 44'; Thomas 20'	Stadium: John Smith's Stadium

26 January 2020	Lewes (2)	1–1 (a.e.t.) (5–4 p)	Billericay Town (4)	Lewes
	Howells 66'	Report	Addison 77'	Stadium: The Dripping Pan; Attendance: 492
	Penalties
	Leek (penalty scored); Howells (penalty scored); King (penalty scored); Rood (penalty scored); Cleverly (penalty scored)		(penalty scored) Addison; (penalty scored) Blackie; (penalty missed) Rushen; (penalty scored) P. Smith; (penalty scored) Stimson

26 January 2020	Liverpool (1)	8–1	Blackburn Rovers (2)	Bamber Bridge
	Babajide 10', 33', 61', 88'; Fahey 16'; Charles 36'; Linnett 90'; Stewart 90' (o.g.)	Report	Stewart 18'	Stadium: Irongate; Attendance: 563; Referee: Richard Aspinall

26 January 2020	London City Lionesses (2)	0–5	Reading (1)	Dartford
		Report	Williams 13', 78'; Potter 30'; Pacheco 44'; Utland 58'	Stadium: Princes Park

26 January 2020	Sheffield United (2)	0–3	Birmingham City (1)	Whittington Moor
		Report	H. Scott 55', 90+2'; Staniforth 59'	Stadium: SMH Group Stadium; Attendance: 335; Referee: Adam Williamson

26 January 2020	Southampton (4)	1–4	Coventry United (2)	Southampton
	Panting 90'	Report	O'Brien 55'; Worts 59', 65', 90'	Stadium: St Mary's Stadium; Attendance: 4,510

26 January 2020	Sunderland (3)	2–0	Watford (3)	Hebburn
	Brown 45'; Ramshaw 79'	Report		Stadium: Hebburn Sports & Social Ground; Attendance: 226

26 January 2020	Tottenham Hotspur (1)	5–0	Barnsley (4)	Edgware
	Dean 20', 27'; Worm 25'; Davison 58'; Sulola 65'	Report		Stadium: The Hive Stadium

26 January 2020	West Ham United (1)	0–2	Arsenal (1)	Romford
		Report	McCabe 16'; Wälti 73'	Stadium: Rush Green Stadium; Attendance: 959

2 February 2020	Crystal Palace (2)	0–4	Southampton Women (4)	Carshalton
	Stobbs 35', 75'; Goad 65'; Mosengo 80'	Report		Stadium: War Memorial Sports Ground; Attendance: 312

== Fifth round proper ==
Eight matches were scheduled for the fifth round proper which were due to be played on 16 and 17 February 2020 but three matches were postponed. The 16 teams taking part are the match winners from the previous round. The lowest ranked team left in the competition, Ipswich Town of the FA Women's National League Division One South East (tier 4), were drawn against defending champions Manchester City.

Number of teams per tier still in competition
Super League	Championship	Premier Division	Division One	Regional & County	Total
10 / 12	4 / 11	1 / 24	1 / 19	0 / 5	16 / 71

17 February 2020	Bristol City (1)	0–5	Everton (1)	Bristol
19:30		Report	Kaagman 8', 53'; E. Morgan 18'; Graham 39'; Cain 59'	Stadium: Ashton Gate; Attendance: 1,889

17 February 2020	Coventry United (2)	0–5	Tottenham Hotspur (1)	Coventry
19:45		Report	Worm 19'; Dean 28' (pen.), 45' (pen.), 90'; Leon 78'	Stadium: Butts Park Arena

20 February 2020	Leicester City (2)	2–1 (a.e.t.)	Reading (1)	Quorn
19:45	Bailey-Gayle 79', 116'	Report	Chaplen 45' (pen.)	Stadium: Farley Way Stadium
Note: Originally scheduled for 16 February, postponed due to adverse weather conditions

25 February 2020	Crystal Palace (2)	0–3	Brighton & Hove Albion (1)	Bromley
19:30		Report	Jarrett 14', 46'; Umotong 69'	Stadium: Hayes Lane
Note: Originally scheduled for 16 February, postponed due to adverse weather conditions

16 February 2020	Manchester City (1)	10–0	Ipswich Town (4)	Manchester
14:00	Coombs 19'; Bremer 25', 50', 64'; Park 30', 78', 80'; Stanway 57', 65', 86'	Report		Stadium: Academy Stadium; Attendance: 1,314

23 February 2020	Arsenal (1)	2–0	Lewes (2)	Borehamwood
13:00	Foord 54'; Van de Donk 84'	Report		Stadium: Meadow Park
Note: Originally scheduled for 16 February, postponed due to adverse weather conditions

16 February 2020	Sunderland (3)	0–1	Birmingham City (1)	Hetton-le-Hole
13:00		Report	Staniforth 85'	Stadium: Eppleton CW

17 February 2020	Chelsea (1)	1–0	Liverpool (1)	Kingston upon Thames
19:00	Reiten 26'	Report		Stadium: Kingsmeadow

== Quarter-finals ==
The four quarter-final fixtures were scheduled to be played on Sunday 15 March 2020 but postponed due to coronavirus pandemic. They were eventually rescheduled for 26–27 September 2020.

Number of teams per tier still in competition
Super League	Championship	Premier Division	Division One	Regional & County	Total
7 / 12	1 / 11	0 / 24	0 / 19	0 / 5	8 / 71

27 September 2020	Brighton & Hove Albion (1)	2–2 (a.e.t.) (2–4 p)	Birmingham City (1)	Crawley
14:00	Bowman 25' (pen.); O'Sullivan 89'	Report	Mayling 5'; M. Green 52' (pen.)	Stadium: Broadfield Stadium; Referee: Rebecca Welch
	Penalties
	K. Green (penalty missed); Le Tissier (penalty scored); Jarrett (penalty scored); Connolly (penalty missed)		(penalty scored) M. Green; (penalty missed) Walker; (penalty scored) Murray; (penalty scored) Mayling; (penalty scored) Brougham

27 September 2020	Everton (1)	2–1	Chelsea (1)	Liverpool
13:00	Graham 40'; Gauvin 63'	Report	Cuthbert 5'	Stadium: Goodison Park; Referee: Simon Mather

26 September 2020	Arsenal (1)	4–0	Tottenham Hotspur (1)	Borehamwood
17:15	Nobbs 72'; Evans 73', 84', 90'	Report		Stadium: Meadow Park; Referee: Lucy Oliver

27 September 2020	Leicester City (2)	1–2	Manchester City (1)	Quorn
14:00	Devlin 78' (pen.)	Report	Kelly 36' (pen.); Stanway 41'	Stadium: Farley Way Stadium; Referee: Robert Massey-Ellis

== Semi-finals ==
Number of teams per tier still in competition
Super League	Championship	Premier Division	Division One	Regional & County	Total
4 / 12	0 / 11	0 / 24	0 / 19	0 / 5	4 / 71

30 September 2020	Birmingham City (1)	0–3	Everton (1)	Solihull
19:15		Report	Magill 44'; Sørensen 60'; Gauvin 87'	Stadium: Damson Park; Referee: Amy Fearns

1 October 2020	Manchester City (1)	2–1	Arsenal (1)	Manchester
19:15	Houghton 19'; Mewis 41'	Report	Nobbs 38'	Stadium: Academy Stadium; Referee: Helen Conley

== Final ==
The final was played at Wembley Stadium on Saturday 1 November 2020.

1 November 2020
14:30 BST

Everton	1–3 (a.e.t.)	Manchester City
Gauvin 60'	Report	Mewis 40'; Stanway 111'; Beckie 120+2'

Wembley Stadium, London
Attendance: 0 (Note: The final was played behind closed doors due to the COVID-19 pandemic in the United Kingdom.)
Referee: Rebecca Welch (Durham)

== Television rights ==
The following matches were/will be broadcast live on UK television:

Round	BBC	Ref.
Fourth round proper	Manchester United v Manchester City (BBC Red Button)	
Fifth round proper	Arsenal v Lewes (BBC Red Button)	
Quarter-finals	Arsenal v Tottenham Hotspur (BBC Two)	
Semi-finals	Birmingham City v Everton (BBC Four); Manchester City vs Chelsea (BBC Two)	
Final	Everton v Manchester City (BBC One)	
