= 2013–14 Combination Women's Football League =

Combination Women's Football Leagues
- Season: 2013–14

The 2013–14 Combination Women's Football League was the 16th and final season of the Combination Leagues. Following the conclusion of the season, the Leagues were absorbed into the FA Women's Premier League.

== Northern Combination Women's Football League ==
Combination Women's Football League Northern League
- Season: 2013–14

=== League Table ===
Pos	Team	Pld	W	D	L	GF	GA	GD	Pts	Promotion or relegation
1	Huddersfield Town (C, P)	22	18	0	4	76	32	+44	54	Promotion
2	Chorley	22	15	1	6	61	36	+25	46	
3	Mossley Hill	22	14	3	5	66	32	+34	45	
4	Tranmere Rovers	22	13	1	8	63	39	+24	40	
5	Stockport County	22	12	2	8	66	44	+22	38	
6	Middlesbrough	22	11	3	8	43	53	−10	36	
7	Chester-le-Street	22	11	2	9	57	41	+16	35	
8	Liverpool Marshall Feds	22	9	5	8	44	43	+1	32	
9	Leeds City Vixens	22	7	2	13	24	49	−25	23	
10	Sheffield United	22	6	3	13	38	65	−27	21	
11	Cheadle Heath Nomads (R)	22	2	2	18	23	74	−51	8	Relegation
12	Wakefield (R)	22	2	0	20	29	82	−53	6	Relegation

Source: The Football Association
Rules for classification: 1) Points; 2) Goal difference; 3) Number of goals scored
(C) Champions; (P) Promoted; (R) Relegated

=== Results ===
Home \ Away	HUT	CHO	MOH	TRA	STO	MID	CLS	LMF	LCV	SHU	CHN	WAK
Huddersfield Town	—	2–0	2–4	5–0	5–4	3–0	4–0	5–1	3–1	6–0	3–4	6–0
Chorley	2–3	—	4–3	4–0	3–1	4–3	1–0	2–1	4–1	5–1	6–1	5–2
Mossley Hill	3–1	3–2	—	2–5	3–0	4–2	1–3	1–1	6–0	3–0	7–0	5–0
Tranmere Rovers	1–2	1–4	1–3	—	3–2	8–0	4–3	3–0	0–0	3–1	11–0	2–1
Stockport County	5–0	1–0	1–4	3–2	—	2–3	6–3	2–1	6–2	4–4	3–1	5–1
Middlesbrough	3–5	3–2	2–1	2–1	2–1	—	0–3	1–3	4–1	2–2	2–1	2–1
Chester-le-Street	2–3	6–1	1–0	0–3	3–1	2–3	—	0–3	H–W	2–3	3–3	3–0
Liverpool Marshall Feds	0–6	2–2	1–1	2–3	0–1	2–2	2–2	—	4–3	3–1	5–1	4–2
Leeds City Vixens	A–W	0–4	1–3	3–2	0–2	1–1	0–4	0–2	—	1–0	2–1	3–1
Sheffield United	0–6	1–2	2–3	0–4	3–3	4–2	2–6	2–4	1–2	—	3–0	3–2
Cheadle Heath Nomads	A–W	A–W	1–1	1–3	1–5	A–W	1–6	2–1	1–2	1–2	—	1–4
Wakefield	2–6	1–4	2–5	1–3	0–8	2–4	0–5	1–2	0–1	1–3	5–2	—

Source: The Football Association
Legend: Blue = home team win; Yellow = draw; Red = away team win.

== Midland Combination Women's Football League ==
Combination Women's Football League Midlands League
- Season: 2013–14

=== League table ===
Pos	Team	Pld	W	D	L	GF	GA	GD	Pts	Promotion or relegation
1	Copsewood (Coventry) (C, P)	20	17	2	1	69	17	+52	55	Promotion to the Northern Division
2	Leicester City	20	13	3	4	58	19	+39	42	
3	Rotherham United	20	11	2	7	57	34	+23	35	
4	Leicester City Ladies	20	11	2	7	45	37	+8	35	
5	Leafield Athletic	20	10	4	6	41	33	+8	34	
6	Loughborough Students	20	9	3	8	55	39	+16	33	
7	Loughborough Foxes	20	8	2	10	48	67	−19	25	
8	Curzon Ashton	20	5	3	12	28	59	−31	18	
9	Mansfield Town	20	4	3	13	27	61	−34	18	
10	Solihull	20	2	5	13	22	45	−23	11	
11	Radcliffe Olympic	20	4	3	13	28	67	−39	2	

Source: The Football Association
Rules for classification: 1) Points; 2) Goal difference; 3) Number of goals scored
(C) Champions; (P) Promoted

=== Results ===
Home \ Away	COP	LCW	ROT	LCL	LEA	LST	LOF	CUA	MAT	SOL	RAD
Copsewood (Coventry)	—	1–2	1–0	3–1	0–0	3–0	12–1	7–0	2–1	2–1	2–2
Leicester City	1–2	—	1–2	2–1	0–1	2–0	5–0	5–0	8–0	2–0	5–0
Rotherham United	3–8	2–7	—	3–1	5–0	1–2	7–4	0–0	5–1	2–0	6–1
Leicester City Ladies	2–3	1–0	0–2	—	1–0	4–2	4–3	5–1	4–3	1–1	3–1
Leafield Athletic	0–1	2–2	1–1	3–2	—	0–4	3–2	5–2	2–3	4–1	4–1
Loughborough Students	1–3	2–2	1–6	1–2	2–1	—	4–2	10–1	6–1	2–2	7–0
Loughborough Foxes	1–4	0–4	2–7	2–4	2–2	4–3	—	5–2	3–1	3–1	2–2
Curzon Ashton	0–3	1–2	1–0	1–3	0–2	1–1	0–2	—	3–2	2–1	6–1
Mansfield Town	0–4	1–4	1–0	2–2	1–2	0–3	0–6	2–1	—	2–2	3–0
Solihull	0–3	1–1	2–0	2–4	1–4	1–2	1–2	1–4	1–1	—	2–1
Radcliffe Olympic	1–5	2–3	0–5	2–0	2–5	3–2	1–2	2–2	3–2	3–1	—

Source: The Football Association
Legend: Blue = home team win; Yellow = draw; Red = away team win.

== South East Combination Women's Football League ==
Combination Women's Football League South East League
- Season: 2013–14

=== League table ===
Pos	Team	Pld	W	D	L	GF	GA	GD	Pts	Promotion or relegation
1	Queens Park Rangers (C, P)	20	15	4	1	63	14	+49	49	Promotion to the Southern Division
2	C & K Basildon	20	15	3	2	62	19	+43	48	
3	Norwich City	20	11	2	7	50	38	+12	35	
4	Enfield Town	20	9	5	6	35	27	+8	32	
5	Milton Keynes Dons	20	9	5	6	29	25	+4	32	
6	Denham United	20	8	5	7	37	36	+1	29	
7	Ipswich Town	20	4	9	7	31	40	−9	21	
8	Cambridge United	20	5	3	12	33	38	−5	18	
9	Ebbsfleet United	20	5	4	11	21	39	−18	19	
10	Luton Town	20	4	4	12	33	60	−27	16	
11	Brentwood Town (R)	20	1	4	15	13	71	−58	7	Relegation

Source: The Football Association
Rules for classification: 1) Points; 2) Goal difference; 3) Number of goals scored
(C) Champions; (P) Promoted; (R) Relegated

=== Results ===
Home \ Away	QPR	CKB	NOR	ENF	MKD	DEN	IPS	CAM	EBB	LUT	BRT
Queens Park Rangers	—	1–1	5–0	3–1	2–0	5–2	7–1	1–1	5–0	7–0	4–1
C & K Basildon	1–1	—	2–0	2–1	2–0	0–1	3–2	3–1	5–0	3–2	5–0
Norwich City	1–3	4–1	—	0–1	2–2	3–2	4–0	2–1	2–1	6–3	2–0
Enfield Town	0–4	1–4	1–4	—	1–1	2–1	1–1	4–1	3–0	3–0	4–0
Milton Keynes Dons	0–3	0–3	4–1	2–1	—	2–2	3–2	1–1	H–W	3–1	5–0
Denham United	0–2	1–4	5–4	1–1	1–2	—	4–2	1–0	1–1	3–2	1–1
Ipswich Town	2–2	2–2	1–2	1–2	1–0	1–1	—	1–0	2–2	3–3	2–2
Cambridge United	0–1	2–3	1–6	0–3	0–1	0–2	2–2	—	4–0	2–3	9–0
Ebbsfleet United	2–0	0–2	1–1	1–1	1–0	3–1	0–2	2–3	—	0–2	5–2
Luton Town	1–2	0–9	4–2	1–1	1–1	0–3	0–3	2–3	3–0	—	3–3
Brentwood Town	0–5	0–7	0–4	0–3	0–2	1–4	0–0	0–2	0–2	3–2	—

Source: The Football Association
Legend: Blue = home team win; Yellow = draw; Red = away team win.

== South West Combination Women's Football League ==
Combination Women's Football League South West League
- Season: 2013–14

=== League table ===
Pos	Team	Pld	W	D	L	GF	GA	GD	Pts	Promotion or relegation
1	Plymouth Argyle (C, P)	20	14	4	2	52	17	+35	46	Promotion to the Southern Division
2	Exeter City	20	12	4	4	56	35	+21	40	
3	Chichester City	20	13	5	2	55	24	+31	38	
4	Forest Green Rovers	20	12	1	7	56	35	+21	37	
5	Swindon Town	20	11	2	7	45	24	+21	35	
6	Larkhall Athletic	20	8	2	10	39	39	0	25	
7	Southampton Saints	20	7	0	13	37	46	−9	21	
8	Shanklin	20	6	3	11	19	32	−13	21	
9	Keynsham Development (R)	20	4	7	9	32	49	−17	17	Relegation
10	Newquay (R)	20	5	1	14	21	50	−29	16	Relegation
11	University of Portsmouth (R)	20	3	1	16	10	71	−61	3	Relegation

Source: The Football Association
Rules for classification: 1) Points; 2) Goal difference; 3) Number of goals scored
(C) Champions; (P) Promoted; (R) Relegated

=== Results ===
Home \ Away	PLY	EXE	CHI	FGR	SWT	LAR	SOU	SHA	KED	NEW	UOP
Plymouth Argyle	—	5–0	0–0	4–4	2–1	H–W	2–0	2–1	H–W	4–0	H–W
Exeter City	1–1	—	2–5	2–1	1–4	H–W	3–2	5–2	1–1	2–1	H–W
Chichester City	1–1	2–2	—	4–2	1–1	4–0	2–1	2–1	3–1	5–1	5–0
Forest Green Rovers	3–2	2–3	1–0	—	0–4	3–1	2–0	4–0	5–2	3–0	5–0
Swindon Town	1–3	1–2	0–2	1–3	—	2–2	3–1	5–0	4–1	4–0	4–0
Larkhall Athletic	1–7	1–4	2–3	4–1	0–1	—	4–2	2–1	1–2	2–1	9–1
Southampton Saints	0–5	3–1	2–5	4–3	2–1	1–2	—	0–1	6–1	4–0	1–2
Shanklin	2–4	1–2	1–0	1–0	0–1	2–3	1–0	—	0–0	0–0	3–0
Keynsham Development	0–3	2–5	4–4	3–6	0–4	1–1	7–0	1–1	—	5–2	H–W
Newquay	2–1	0–5	2–4	0–1	3–1	3–1	0–5	0–1	2–0	—	3–0
University of Portsmouth	0–6	1–15	0–3	0–7	1–2	0–3	1–3	1–0	1–1	2–1	—

Source: The Football Association
Legend: Blue = home team win; Yellow = draw; Red = away team win.
