= 2014–15 FA Women's Premier League =

FA Women's Premier League
- Season: 2014–15
- Champions: Sheffield
- Promoted: Sheffield

The 2014–15 FA Women's Premier League season was the 24th season of the competition, which began in 1992. Formerly the top flight of women's football in England, this season it sits at the third and fourth levels of the women's football pyramid, below the two divisions of the FA Women's Super League and above the eight regional football leagues.

This season saw the Premier League expand to cover the Regional Leagues as well. The league features six regional divisions: the Northern and Southern divisions at level three of the pyramid, and below those Northern Division 1, Midlands Division 1, South East Division 1, and South West Division 1, the former Combination Leagues. 67 teams were members of the league at the beginning of the 2014–15 season, with 12 teams in the Northern and Southern Divisions, and the Northern and Midlands Division 1. South East Division 1 had 10 teams and South West Division 1 had 9 teams. At the end of the season the champions of the Northern and Southern divisions qualified for a playoff match against each other which decided the overall league champion, who was promoted to FA WSL 2.

== Team name changes ==
2013–14	2014–15
Leeds United	Leeds
Leeds City Vixens	Guiseley Vixens

== Premier Division ==
=== Northern Division ===
FA Women's Premier League Northern Division
- Season: 2014–15
- Champions: Sheffield
- Promoted: Sheffield
- Relegated: Wolverhampton Wanderers
- Matches: 132
- Goals: 519 (3.93 per match)
- Highest scoring: Sheffield 11–2 Huddersfield Town (7 December 2014)

Map showing the locations of the teams in the Northern Division of the FA Women's Premier League
Map showing the locations of the teams in the Northern Division of the FA Women's Premier League

Changes from last season:

- Huddersfield Town were promoted from the Northern Combination League
- Leeds United were relegated to the Northern Division One
- Coventry City were moved from the Southern Division

==== League table ====
Pos	Team	Pld	W	D	L	GF	GA	GD	Pts	Promotion or relegation
1	Sheffield (C, O, P)	22	19	1	2	76	19	+57	58	Qualification for the Championship play-off
2	Coventry City	22	18	2	2	64	16	+48	56	
3	Blackburn Rovers	22	13	3	6	46	34	+12	42	
4	Bradford City	22	11	6	5	49	28	+21	39	
5	Huddersfield Town	22	8	5	9	53	65	−12	29	
6	Derby County	22	8	3	11	45	56	−11	27	
7	Stoke City	22	8	2	12	38	38	0	26	
8	Preston North End	22	7	5	10	41	46	−5	26	
9	Nottingham Forest	22	7	2	13	34	52	−18	23	
10	Sporting Club Albion	22	5	6	11	23	36	−13	21	
11	Newcastle United	22	5	5	12	33	50	−17	20	
12	Wolverhampton Wanderers (R)	22	2	2	18	17	79	−62	8	Relegation to the Midlands Division One

Source: FA WPL
(C) Champions; (O) Play-off winners; (P) Promoted; (R) Relegated

==== Results ====
Home \ Away	BLB	BRC	CVC	DER	HUD	NEW	NOT	PNE	SCA	SHE	STC	WOL
Blackburn Rovers	—	4–1	0–4	1–0	2–3	3–1	3–2	1–0	2–1	2–1	4–1	6–0
Bradford City	2–4	—	1–1	2–0	2–3	2–2	4–1	0–0	1–1	3–0	0–0	10–1
Coventry City	5–0	2–0	—	6–2	6–4	2–0	2–0	2–2	3–0	0–1	4–0	2–0
Derby County	2–1	1–3	0–4	—	2–1	4–1	5–3	2–4	2–3	0–2	3–2	3–0
Huddersfield Town	4–4	1–2	1–4	4–4	—	3–3	4–1	2–6	1–1	1–3	1–4	3–0
Newcastle United	1–1	2–3	0–3	4–0	0–3	—	1–1	1–2	1–3	2–5	2–1	1–1
Nottingham Forest	0–1	0–1	0–1	2–2	4–5	2–1	—	2–1	0–2	0–6	3–2	1–0
Preston North End	0–2	1–1	1–5	2–3	0–4	1–3	3–5	—	1–1	2–2	2–1	6–2
Sporting Club Albion	1–1	1–2	0–1	2–2	0–1	2–3	0–3	2–3	—	0–3	2–1	0–0
Sheffield	3–1	3–2	2–0	4–1	11–2	4–1	4–0	3–0	3–0	—	3–1	4–0
Stoke City	2–1	0–2	1–3	2–1	2–2	4–0	3–1	2–1	0–1	0–1	—	2–1
Wolverhampton Wanderers	0–2	0–5	1–4	3–6	4–0	0–3	1–3	0–3	2–0	1–8	0–7	—

Source: FA WPL
Legend: Blue = home team win; Yellow = draw; Red = away team win.

=== Southern Division ===
FA Women's Premier League Southern Division
- Season: 2014–15
- Champions: Portsmouth
- Relegated: Gillingham; Keynsham Town
- Matches: 132
- Goals: 541 (4.1 per match)
- Biggest home win: Charlton Athletic 11–1 Plymouth Argyle (17 May 2015)
- Biggest away win: Keynsham Town 1–12 Charlton Athletic (24 August 2014)

Map showing the locations of the teams in the Southern Division of the FA Women's Premier League
Map showing the locations of the teams in the Southern Division of the FA Women's Premier League

Changes from last season:

- Copeswood (Coventry) were promoted from the Midlands Combination League
- Queens Park Rangers were promoted from the South East Combination League
- Plymouth Argyle were promoted from the South West Combination League
- Coventry City were moved to the Northern Division
- Chesham United were relegated to the Southern Region League First Division - Northern

==== League table ====
Pos	Team	Pld	W	D	L	GF	GA	GD	Pts	Promotion or relegation
1	Portsmouth (C)	22	18	2	2	62	25	+37	56	Qualification for the Championship play-off
2	Brighton & Hove Albion	22	17	2	3	63	22	+41	53	
3	Charlton Athletic	22	15	3	4	88	34	+54	48	
4	Cardiff City	22	14	3	5	69	26	+43	45	
5	Tottenham Hotspur	22	12	3	7	60	40	+20	39	
6	West Ham United	22	10	5	7	39	30	+9	35	
7	Queens Park Rangers	22	6	4	12	28	42	−14	22	
8	Lewes	22	6	3	13	31	37	−6	21	
9	Copsewood (Coventry)	22	6	2	14	22	66	−44	20	
10	Plymouth Argyle	22	4	6	12	25	60	−35	18	
11	Gillingham (R)	22	4	3	15	28	65	−37	15	Relegation to the South East Division One
12	Keynsham Town (R)	22	1	2	19	26	94	−68	5	Relegation to the South West Division One

Source: FA WPL
(C) Champions; (R) Relegated

==== Results ====
Home \ Away	BHA	CAR	CCV	CHA	GIL	KYT	LEW	PLY	POR	QPR	TOT	WHU
Brighton & Hove Albion	—	5–0	3–1	5–1	3–1	H–W	3–0	4–1	0–2	2–0	3–2	3–0
Cardiff City	1–1	—	2–0	3–3	6–2	5–1	2–0	5–0	0–1	2–0	4–0	1–2
Copsewood (Coventry)	0–3	1–6	—	0–3	1–1	3–0	0–5	2–1	0–5	1–0	3–1	0–3
Charlton Athletic	4–1	1–4	7–0	—	3–0	4–0	5–0	11–1	6–3	5–0	2–1	3–3
Gillingham	1–5	1–7	6–2	0–4	—	2–1	1–3	0–0	1–4	0–1	2–4	3–2
Keynsham Town	1–5	0–6	1–4	1–12	5–3	—	0–6	3–3	1–3	1–8	1–5	1–3
Lewes	0–1	0–2	3–0	1–2	0–1	2–2	—	2–0	0–3	1–2	1–1	0–1
Plymouth Argyle	0–5	2–1	3–1	3–5	3–2	2–1	2–2	—	0–3	0–0	1–3	0–0
Portsmouth	2–1	3–7	2–2	2–1	3–0	6–0	2–0	1–0	—	3–1	4–1	3–1
Queens Park Rangers	1–3	0–3	3–0	1–4	0–0	3–2	2–1	1–1	2–3	—	1–3	1–2
Tottenham Hotspur	2–5	2–2	8–0	5–2	3–0	5–3	4–2	3–0	1–1	4–0	—	0–2
West Ham United	2–2	1–0	0–1	0–0	5–1	4–1	1–2	5–2	0–3	1–1	1–2	—

Source: FA WPL
Legend: Blue = home team win; Yellow = draw; Red = away team win.

=== Championship play-off ===
The overall FA WPL champion was decided by a play-off match held at The Arden Garages Stadium on 24 May 2015, which resulted in a 1–0 win for Northern Division side Sheffield over Southern Division side Portsmouth. The following month, Sheffield won promotion to WSL 2 after meeting the FA's licensing criteria.

24 May 2015

Sheffield	1–0	Portsmouth
Giampalma 90+2'	Report

The Arden Garages Stadium, Tiddington
Attendance: 308
Referee: L Rashid

== Division One ==
=== Northern Division One ===
FA Women's Premier League Northern Division One
- Season: 2014–15
- Champions: Guiseley Vixens
- Promoted: Guiseley Vixens
- Relegated: Sheffield United
- Matches: 132
- Goals: 533 (4.04 per match)
- Biggest away win: Sheffield United 1–9 Guiseley Vixens (25 January 2015)
- Highest scoring: Sheffield United 3–8 Stockport County (22 February 2015)

Changes from last season:

- Leeds City Vixens became Guiseley Vixens after merging with Guiseley.
- Leeds United were relegated from the Northern Division
- Leeds United became Leeds
- Huddersfield Town were promoted to the Northern Division
- Cheadle Heath Nomads were relegated from the Northern Combination League
- Wakefield were relegated from the Northern Combination League
- Morecambe were promoted to the Northern Division One
- Norton & Stockton Ancients were promoted to the Northern Division One
Map showing the locations of the teams in the Northern Division One of the FA Women's Premier League

==== League table ====
Pos	Team	Pld	W	D	L	GF	GA	GD	Pts	Promotion or relegation
1	Guiseley Vixens (C, P)	22	17	1	4	78	35	+43	52	Promotion to the Northern Division
2	Liverpool Marshall Feds	22	16	2	4	46	26	+20	50	
3	Leeds	22	15	1	6	57	31	+26	46	
4	Middlesbrough	22	11	4	7	56	40	+16	37	
5	Chorley	22	11	3	8	44	36	+8	36	
6	Chester-le-Street	22	10	4	8	44	38	+6	34	
7	Mossley Hill	22	10	3	9	55	38	+17	33	
8	Stockport County	22	8	2	12	46	58	−12	26	
9	Tranmere Rovers	22	6	6	10	20	31	−11	24	
10	Morecambe	22	7	1	14	40	45	−5	22	
11	Norton & Stockton Ancients (R)	22	5	1	16	26	65	−39	16	Relegation from the Premier League.
12	Sheffield United (R)	22	1	2	19	21	90	−69	5	Relegation from the Premier League.

Source: The Football Association
Rules for classification: 1) Points; 2) Goal difference; 3) Number of goals scored
(C) Champions; (P) Promoted; (R) Relegated

==== Results ====
Home \ Away	CLS	CHO	GUV	LEE	LMF	MID	MOR	MOH	NSA	SHU	STO	TRA
Chester-le-Street	—	5–0	0–5	2–3	0–1	0–0	2–0	1–1	3–1	3–0	3–3	2–1
Chorley	3–1	—	2–1	1–4	2–3	6–3	2–1	1–0	7–0	1–1	2–2	2–0
Guiseley Vixens	1–2	2–1	—	1–3	5–3	1–3	5–3	3–2	5–1	2–0	6–1	5–0
Leeds	2–2	1–2	3–6	—	1–2	2–0	2–3	5–2	4–1	7–0	4–2	3–1
Liverpool Marshall Feds	4–0	1–0	1–1	0–1	—	3–1	1–0	2–1	3–0	2–0	4–0	2–1
Middlesbrough	3–1	5–3	1–5	2–1	2–0	—	3–0	0–4	1–2	8–0	3–1	1–1
Morecambe	2–3	4–1	2–3	1–3	6–1	0–3	—	1–4	1–1	7–1	0–3	0–1
Mossley Hill	2–0	2–1	3–4	0–2	0–3	2–2	2–3	—	8–0	2–1	5–1	1–1
Norton & Stockton Ancients	3–2	0–1	1–4	0–2	0–1	1–6	1–2	0–5	—	7–0	4–1	0–1
Sheffield United	0–4	1–3	1–9	1–2	2–3	1–8	1–4	3–4	1–2	—	3–8	0–0
Stockport County	1–4	3–1	1–2	2–1	2–5	2–3	1–0	4–3	4–1	2–3	—	2–0
Tranmere Rovers	2–4	0–0	1–2	0–1	1–1	1–1	2–1	0–2	3–0	2–1	1–0	—

Source: The Football Association
Legend: Blue = home team win; Yellow = draw; Red = away team win.

=== Midlands Division One ===
FA Women's Premier League Midlands Division One
- Season: 2014–15
- Champions: Loughborough Foxes
- Promoted: Loughborough Foxes
- Relegated: Mansfield Town; Curzon Ashton
- Matches: 132
- Goals: 519 (3.93 per match)
- Biggest home win: Leafield Athletic 11–1 Curzon Ashton (17 May 2015)
- Biggest away win: Leicester City Ladies 0–7 Leafield Athletic (12 April 2015)

Changes from last season:

- Copeswood (Coventry) were promoted to the Southern Division
- FC Reedswood were promoted to the Midlands Division One
- Steel City Wanderers were promoted to the Midlands Division One
Map showing the locations of the teams in Midlands Division One of the FA Women's Premier League

==== League table ====
Pos	Team	Pld	W	D	L	GF	GA	GD	Pts	Promotion or relegation
1	Loughborough Foxes (C, P)	22	16	4	2	69	26	+43	52	Promotion to the Northern Division
2	Leicester City	22	14	4	4	51	23	+28	46	
3	Leafield Athletic	22	14	1	7	70	38	+32	43	
4	Radcliffe Olympic	22	13	4	5	52	26	+26	43	
5	Loughborough Students	22	10	3	9	43	34	+9	33	
6	Rotherham United	22	10	2	10	51	53	−2	32	
7	Solihull	22	8	5	9	44	45	−1	29	
8	FC Reedswood	22	8	3	11	41	41	0	27	
9	Leicester City Ladies	22	7	5	10	20	32	−12	26	
10	Steel City Wanderers	22	6	3	13	31	50	−19	21	
11	Mansfield Town (R)	22	5	6	11	30	59	−29	21	Relegation from the Premier League.
12	Curzon Ashton (R)	22	0	2	20	17	92	−75	2	Relegation from the Premier League.

Source: Football Association
Rules for classification: 1) Points; 2) Goal difference; 3) Number of goals scored
(C) Champions; (P) Promoted; (R) Relegated

==== Results ====
Home \ Away	CUA	LEA	LCL	LCW	LOF	LST	MAT	RAD	ROT	SOL	FCR	SCW
Curzon Ashton	—	0–5	0–2	1–6	2–4	1–5	1–1	2–2	1–7	1–2	0–2	0–3
Leafield Athletic	11–1	—	0–0	2–1	1–2	4–1	2–1	5–4	4–1	3–2	2–3	5–1
Leicester City Ladies	2–1	0–7	—	0–1	1–1	1–2	1–1	1–3	1–2	0–1	2–1	1–2
Leicester City	3–2	4–1	0–0	—	3–3	5–0	1–1	1–1	4–2	2–1	2–1	1–0
Loughborough Foxes	4–1	5–3	0–1	1–0	—	3–2	8–1	2–1	6–0	2–2	3–0	6–1
Loughborough Students	6–0	1–0	2–1	1–0	0–0	—	7–1	1–3	1–0	1–2	3–2	3–0
Mansfield Town	4–0	1–4	1–1	0–2	2–4	1–0	—	0–3	2–2	2–1	5–2	1–0
Radcliffe Olympic	5–2	2–0	0–1	1–2	1–0	2–1	6–0	—	2–1	2–0	2–2	1–0
Rotherham United	4–1	3–0	5–1	2–6	2–5	3–2	3–0	0–0	—	2–4	1–0	3–2
Solihull	5–0	3–4	0–1	1–3	1–4	3–2	5–5	2–4	2–1	—	1–0	2–2
FC Reedswood	6–0	2–3	1–2	1–0	0–4	1–1	3–0	1–6	6–1	1–1	—	2–1
Steel City Wanderers	3–0	0–4	1–0	1–4	1–2	1–1	3–0	2–1	3–6	3–3	1–4	—

Source: The Football Association
Legend: Blue = home team win; Yellow = draw; Red = away team win.

=== South East Division One ===
FA Women's Premier League South East Division One
- Season: 2014–15
- Champions: C & K Basildon
- Promoted: C & K Basildon
- Matches: 90
- Goals: 306 (3.4 per match)
- Biggest home win: Milton Keynes Dons 12–0 Norwich City (26 October 2014)

Changes from last season:

- Queen Park Rangers were promoted to the Southern Division
- Ebbsfleet United were relegated from the South East Combination League
- Brentwood Town were relegated from the South East Combination League
- Crystal Palace were promoted to the South East Division One
- Bedford were promoted to the South East Division One
Map showing the locations of the teams in South East Division One of the FA Women's Premier League

==== League table ====
Pos	Team	Pld	W	D	L	GF	GA	GD	Pts	Promotion or relegation
1	C & K Basildon (C, P)	18	13	3	2	54	21	+33	42	Promotion to the Southern Division
2	Milton Keynes Dons	18	12	4	2	40	15	+25	40	
3	Crystal Palace	18	11	4	3	41	22	+19	37	
4	Luton Town	18	8	3	7	29	30	−1	27	
5	Enfield Town	18	7	4	7	29	30	−1	25	
6	Denham United	18	6	5	7	35	24	+11	23	
7	Cambridge United	18	5	5	8	19	29	−10	20	
8	Bedford	18	5	3	10	29	38	−9	18	
9	Ipswich Town	18	3	5	10	30	42	−12	14	
10	Norwich City	18	1	2	15	15	70	−55	5	

Source: The Football Association
Rules for classification: 1) Points; 2) Goal difference; 3) Number of goals scored
(C) Champions; (P) Promoted

==== Results ====
Home \ Away	BED	CAM	CKB	CRY	DEN	ENF	IPS	LUT	MKD	NOR
Bedford	—	0–1	0–3	1–2	0–2	2–2	1–2	1–2	0–6	3–2
Cambridge United	0–1	—	1–2	3–3	2–1	0–2	2–1	2–0	0–1	1–1
C & K Basildon	3–2	2–2	—	3–2	2–1	3–0	5–0	3–0	5–0	6–0
Crystal Palace	0–0	4–0	3–2	—	3–1	4–1	4–1	4–1	0–2	H–W
Denham United	1–1	1–1	1–2	0–2	—	3–1	1–1	1–1	3–1	6–1
Enfield Town	1–3	3–0	2–2	2–2	3–2	—	1–1	1–2	1–2	2–0
Ipswich Town	4–6	1–1	1–4	2–4	2–0	0–1	—	1–1	2–2	6–0
Luton Town	2–1	4–0	1–3	3–0	0–5	2–3	3–2	—	0–1	2–1
Milton Keynes Dons	5–1	1–0	2–1	0–0	1–1	1–0	1–0	1–1	—	12–0
Norwich City	0–6	1–3	3–3	0–4	0–5	1–3	5–3	0–4	0–1	—

Source: The Football Association
Legend: Blue = home team win; Yellow = draw; Red = away team win.

=== South West Division One ===
FA Women's Premier League South West Division One
- Season: 2014–15
- Champions: Forest Green Rovers
- Promoted: Forest Green Rovers
- Matches: 72
- Goals: 279 (3.88 per match)
- Biggest home win: Exeter City 8–0 Cheltenham Town (12 April 2015)
- Biggest away win: St Nicholas 0–7 Forest Green Rovers (29 March 2015)
- Highest scoring: Cheltenham Town 4–6 Southampton Saints (9 November 2014)

Changes from last season:

- Plymouth Argyle were promoted to the Southern Division
- Keynsham Town Development were relegated from the South West Combination League
- Newquay were relegated from the South West Combination League
- University of Portsmouth were relegated from the South West Combination League
- Cheltenham Town were promoted to the South West Division One
- St Nicholas were promoted to the South West Division One
Map showing the locations of the teams in South West Division One of the FA Women's Premier League

==== League table ====
Pos	Team	Pld	W	D	L	GF	GA	GD	Pts	Promotion or relegation
1	Forest Green Rovers (C, P)	16	10	2	4	44	19	+25	32	Promotion to the Southern Division
2	Exeter City	16	10	2	4	45	23	+22	32	
3	Swindon Town	16	10	4	2	42	18	+24	31 (Note: Swindon Town were deducted 3 points)	
4	Southampton Saints	16	9	1	6	39	30	+9	28	
5	Larkhall Athletic	16	7	2	7	31	26	+5	23	
6	Shanklin	16	6	4	6	22	28	−6	22	
7	Chichester City	16	6	3	7	26	27	−1	21	
8	Cheltenham Town	16	3	2	11	19	52	−33	11	
9	St Nicholas	16	1	0	15	11	56	−45	3	

Source: The Football Association
Rules for classification: 1) Points; 2) Goal difference; 3) Number of goals scored
(C) Champions; (P) Promoted

==== Results ====
Home \ Away	CHE	CHI	EXE	FGR	LAR	SHA	SOU	STN	SWT
Cheltenham Town	—	1–4	0–4	1–5	0–0	0–4	4–6	3–0	1–4
Chichester City	5–1	—	1–2	2–1	1–1	1–1	1–3	1–0	0–3
Exeter City	8–0	2–0	—	0–4	3–1	5–0	2–1	3–0	3–1
Forest Green Rovers	3–0	3–1	2–2	—	3–0	1–1	4–0	4–0	1–3
Larkhall Athletic	1–2	3–0	1–4	5–0	—	2–3	1–0	4–2	1–4
Shanklin	2–2	1–2	2–1	1–3	1–3	—	0–2	2–1	0–0
Southampton Saints	3–1	4–1	4–2	2–3	2–1	0–2	—	5–0	3–3
St Nicholas	1–2	0–5	4–2	0–7	0–4	0–2	2–3	—	0–4
Swindon Town	2–1	1–1	2–2	1–0	1–3	5–0	3–1	5–1	—

Source: The Football Association
Legend: Blue = home team win; Yellow = draw; Red = away team win.
