= 2015–16 FA Women's Premier League =

FA Women's Premier League
- Season: 2015–16
- Champions: Brighton & Hove Albion
- Promoted: Brighton & Hove Albion

The 2015–16 FA Women's Premier League is the 25th season of the competition, which began in 1992. Formerly the top flight of women's football in England, this season it sits at the third and fourth levels of the women's football pyramid, below the two divisions of the FA Women's Super League and above the eight regional football leagues.

The league features six regional divisions: the Northern and Southern divisions at level three of the pyramid, and below those Northern Division 1, Midlands Division 1, South East Division 1, and South West Division 1. 72 teams were members of the league at the beginning of the 2015–16 season, divided equally into six divisions of twelve teams. At the end of the season the champions of the Northern and Southern divisions will both qualify for a playoff match against each other which will decide the overall league champion, who subject to meeting league requirements will be promoted to FA WSL 2.

== Premier Division ==
=== Northern Division ===
FA Women's Premier League Northern Division
- Season: 2015–16
- Champions: Sporting Club Albion
- Promoted: N/A
- Relegated: Guiseley Vixens; Loughborough Foxes

Map showing the locations of the teams in the Northern Division of the FA Women's Premier League

Changes from last season:

- League champions Sheffield were promoted to FA WSL 2.
- Wolverhampton Wanderers were relegated to Midlands Division One.
- Loughborough Foxes and Guiseley Vixens were promoted into the Northern Division from Midlands Division One and Northern Division One respectively.
- Copsewood (Coventry) relocated into the Northern Division from the Southern and were renamed Nuneaton Town.
- Coventry United moved in the opposite direction, relocating from the North to the Southern Division.

Team	Home ground	2014–15 position
Blackburn Rovers	Anchor Ground, Darwen	3rd
Bradford City	Plumpton Park, Bradford	4th
Derby County	Anderson Electrical Arena, Derby	6th
Guiseley Vixens	Nethermoor Park, Guiseley	1st in Northern Division One (promoted)
Huddersfield Town	Storthes Hall Park, Kirkburton	5th
Loughborough Foxes	Loughborough University Stadium, Loughborough	1st in Midlands Division One (promoted)
Newcastle United	Sport Northumbria, Newcastle upon Tyne	11th
Nottingham Forest	Greenwich Avenue, Nottingham	9th
Nuneaton Town	Liberty Way, Nuneaton	8th in Southern Division (swapped divisions with Coventry United)
Preston North End	Sir Tom Finney Stadium, Bamber Bridge	8th
Sporting Club Albion	The Grove, Halesowen	10th
Stoke City	Wellbeing Park, Stone	7th

==== League table ====
Pos	Team	Pld	W	D	L	GF	GA	GD	Pts	Promotion or relegation
1	Sporting Club Albion (C)	22	17	2	3	55	22	+33	53	Qualification for the Championship play-off
2	Preston North End	22	15	4	3	71	20	+51	49	
3	Blackburn Rovers	22	14	4	4	39	20	+19	46	
4	Stoke City	22	14	2	6	59	28	+31	44	
5	Bradford City	22	12	2	8	48	31	+17	38	
6	Nottingham Forest	22	11	4	7	37	27	+10	37	
7	Derby County	22	9	1	12	37	47	−10	28	
8	Huddersfield Town	22	7	4	11	47	56	−9	25	
9	Newcastle United	22	7	1	14	33	57	−24	22	
10	Nuneaton Town	22	4	2	16	26	67	−41	14	
11	Guiseley Vixens (R)	22	3	4	15	26	71	−45	13	Relegation to the Division One North
12	Loughborough Foxes (R)	22	3	2	17	26	58	−32	11	Relegation to the Division One Midlands

Source: The Football Association
Rules for classification: 1) Points; 2) Goal difference; 3) Number of goals scored
(C) Champions; (R) Relegated

==== Results ====
Home \ Away	BLB	BRA	DER	GUI	HUD	LOU	NEW	NOT	NUN	PNE	SCA	STK
Blackburn Rovers		1–0	3–1	5–0	4–2	1–0	2–1	0–0	2–0	0–0	2–0	2–1
Bradford City	2–2		3–2	5–1	2–0	2–0	3–0	3–0	1–1	1–2	2–3	1–4
Derby County	4–3	2–1		2–1	0–1	0–0	1–0	2–0	0–1	0–4	1–2	0–3
Guiseley Vixens	0–1	1–5	0–6		0–7	3–2	2–2	1–2	2–2	1–1	0–2	1–5
Huddersfield Town	0–2	0–5	2–6	0–2		7–0	4–3	3–3	3–1	1–4	1–1	3–3
Loughborough Foxes	0–2	1–2	3–4	2–2	1–2		2–1	1–5	6–3	1–2	0–1	2–1
Newcastle United	2–1	3–1	2–0	1–6	2–7	4–2		1–0	6–1	0–5	1–4	0–2
Nottingham Forest	2–1	0–2	2–0	3–0	3–1	1–0	4–0		2–0	2–2	0–2	3–0
Nuneaton Town	0–3	1–2	1–4	4–2	3–1	4–2	1–2	0–2		0–1	2–3	0–2
Preston North End	0–1	2–1	7–1	4–1	6–0	5–1	4–0	2–2	13–0		3–0	0–3
Sporting Club Albion	4–0	4–1	3–0	5–0	0–0	4–0	2–1	2–0	5–1	3–2		3–1
Stoke City	1–1	1–3	5–1	5–0	5–2	2–0	3–1	4–1	3–0	1–2	4–2	

Source: The Football Association
Legend: Blue = home team win; Yellow = draw; Red = away team win.

=== Southern Division ===
FA Women's Premier League Southern Division
- Season: 2015–16
- Champions: Brighton & Hove Albion
- Promoted: Brighton & Hove Albion
- Relegated: Plymouth Argyle

Map showing the locations of the teams in the Southern Division of the FA Women's Premier League

Changes from last season:

- Gillingham and Keynsham Town were relegated to South East and South West Division One respectively.
- Forest Green Rovers and C & K Basildon were promoted from South West and South East Division One.
- Coventry United relocated into the Southern Division from the Northern Division.
- Copsewood (Coventry) renamed themselves Nuneaton Town and relocated to the Northern Division.

Team	Home ground	2014–15 position
Brighton & Hove Albion	Culver Road, Lancing	2nd
C & K Basildon	The Prospect Stadium, Canvey Island	1st South East Division One (promoted)
Cardiff City	CCB Centre for Sporting Excellence, Ystrad Mynach	4th
Charlton Athletic	Bayliss Avenue, Thamesmead, London	3rd
Coventry United	The Oval Ground, Bedworth	2nd in Northern Division (swapped divisions with Nuneaton Town)
Forest Green Rovers	Wisloe Road, Cambridge, Gloucestershire	1st in South West Division One (promoted)
Lewes	The Dripping Pan, Lewes	7th
Plymouth Argyle	Haye Road, Plymouth	10th
Portsmouth	Privett Park, Gosport	1st
Queens Park Rangers	Honeycroft, West Drayton, London	9th
Tottenham Hotspur	Cheshunt Stadium, Cheshunt	5th
West Ham United	Hornchurch Stadium, Upminster, London	6th

==== League table ====
Pos	Team	Pld	W	D	L	GF	GA	GD	Pts	Promotion, qualification or relegation
1	Brighton & Hove Albion (C, O, P)	22	17	3	2	58	18	+40	54	Qualification for the Championship play-off
2	Charlton Athletic	22	16	4	2	68	20	+48	52	
3	Cardiff City	22	15	2	5	66	27	+39	47	
4	Coventry United	22	13	5	4	64	18	+46	44	
5	Portsmouth	22	14	2	6	61	27	+34	44	
6	Tottenham Hotspur	22	11	1	10	34	30	+4	34	
7	Lewes	22	8	1	13	30	42	−12	25	
8	C & K Basildon	22	7	4	11	38	55	−17	25	
9	Queens Park Rangers	22	6	3	13	25	45	−20	21	
10	West Ham United	22	5	4	13	21	60	−39	19	
11	Forest Green Rovers	22	2	2	18	19	76	−57	8	
12	Plymouth Argyle (R)	22	1	3	18	23	89	−66	6	Relegation to Division One South West

Source: The Football Association
Rules for classification: 1) Points; 2) Goal difference; 3) Number of goals scored
(C) Champions; (O) Play-off winners; (P) Promoted; (R) Relegated

==== Results ====
Home \ Away	B&HA	C&KB	CAR	CHA	CVU	FGR	LEW	PLY	POR	QPR	TOT	WHU
Brighton & Hove Albion		6–1	1–2	2–0	2–1	4–0	2–0	3–0	3–1	2–0	4–1	1–0
C & K Basildon	1–6		4–7	1–1	0–0	3–1	2–3	2–1	4–3	3–3	1–4	2–3
Cardiff City	1–2	4–2		3–1	0–3	8–2	5–0	9–1	0–1	7–1	4–0	2–2
Charlton Athletic	0–0	4–1	0–0		1–1	9–1	2–1	5–1	2–1	2–1	1–0	8–1
Coventry United	2–2	2–1	2–0	2–3		4–0	5–0	11–0	1–1	3–0	1–2	5–0
Forest Green Rovers	1–4	0–1	1–2	0–6	1–3		0–6	3–3	0–3	1–2	0–5	1–0
Lewes	0–2	2–1	1–3	0–1	0–4	3–1		4–1	0–2	1–2	0–2	2–2
Plymouth Argyle	0–4	2–4	1–3	1–6	0–4	1–1	1–3		2–5	2–2	2–4	0–2
Portsmouth	2–3	2–2	2–1	1–4	5–1	3–0	0–1	6–0		3–0	3–2	7–0
Queens Park Rangers	2–1	1–0	0–2	1–2	0–5	4–1	1–3	1–2	0–1		0–1	3–1
Tottenham Hotspur	1–2	0–1	0–1	1–2	0–0	2–1	2–0	3–0	0–4	2–1		2–1
West Ham United	2–2	0–1	0–2	0–8	0–4	0–3	1–0	4–2	1–5	0–0	1–0	

Source: The Football Association
Legend: Blue = home team win; Yellow = draw; Red = away team win.

=== Championship play-off ===
The overall FA WPL champion was decided by a play-off match held at Wycombe Wanderers' Adams Park stadium on 29 May 2016, which resulted in a 4–2 victory for Southern Division Brighton & Hove Albion over Northern Division Sporting Club Albion. Brighton won promotion to FA WSL 2 a few days after the match, having met The Football Association's licensing requirements for entry to the Women's Super League.

29 May 2016
14:00 BST

Sporting Club Albion (N)	2–4	Brighton & Hove Albion (S)
Dugmore 15'; Clough 88'	Report	Natkiel 39', 68'; Perry 72'; Taylor 75'

Adams Park, High Wycombe
Attendance: 648
Referee: Anthony Tankard

== Division One ==
=== Northern Division One ===
FA Women's Premier League Northern Division One
- Season: 2015–16
- Champions: Middlesbrough
- Promoted: N/A
- Relegated: Stockport County; Norton & Stockton Ancients

Map showing the locations of the teams in the Northern Division One of the FA Women's Premier League

The teams competing this season are:

Team	Home ground	2014–15 position
Blackpool Wren Rovers	Brews Park, Blackpool	
Chester-le-Street	Moor Park, Chester Moor	6th
Chorley	Jim Fowler Memorial Fields, Leyland	5th
Hull City	Hamworth Park, Hull	
Leeds	Wheatley Park, Garforth	3rd
Liverpool Marshall Feds	I.M. Marsh Campus, Liverpool	2nd
Middlesbrough	Teesdale Park, Thornaby-on-Tees	4th
Morecambe	Lancaster & Morecambe College, Lancaster	10th
Mossley Hill	Mossley Hill Athletic Club, Liverpool	7th
Norton & Stockton Ancients	Norton Sports Complex, Norton	11th
Stockport County	Stockport Sports Village, Woodley	8th
Tranmere Rovers	Cross Lane, Wallasey	9th

==== League table ====
Pos	Team	Pld	W	D	L	GF	GA	GD	Pts	Promotion or relegation
1	Middlesbrough (C, P)	22	17	3	2	90	22	+68	54	Promotion to the Northern Division
2	Liverpool Marshall Feds	22	15	1	6	79	39	+40	46	
3	Chorley	22	13	3	6	60	46	+14	42	
4	Hull City	22	10	7	5	47	39	+8	37	
5	Leeds	22	11	2	9	35	41	−6	35	
6	Mossley Hill	22	11	1	10	46	37	+9	34	
7	Morecambe	22	9	2	11	50	59	−9	29	
8	Blackpool Wren Rovers	22	9	1	12	42	68	−26	28	
9	Chester-le-Street	22	7	6	9	39	47	−8	27	
10	Tranmere Rovers	22	5	4	13	38	52	−14	19	
11	Stockport County (Note: Stockport had three points deducted) (R)	22	5	4	13	46	65	−19	16	Relegation from the Premier League.
12	Norton & Stockton Ancients (R)	22	2	2	18	20	77	−57	8	Relegation from the Premier League.

Source: The Football Association
Rules for classification: 1) Points; 2) Goal difference; 3) Number of goals scored
(C) Champions; (P) Promoted; (R) Relegated

==== Results ====
Home \ Away	MID	LMF	CHO	HUL	LEE	MOH	MOR	BWR	CLS	TRA	STO	NSA
Middlesbrough		2–0	5–1	4–1	6–0	1–2	3–2	13–0	6–0	5–1	10–2	2–2
Liverpool Marshall Feds	5–1		2–3	2–2	0–2	0–1	6–1	3–1	0–4	3–2	7–1	10–1
Chorley	0–5	6–5		1–0	2–1	2–0	5–4	5–0	1–1	4–6	3–3	5–1
Hull City	0–0	2–7	2–2		4–1	4–3	1–1	2–1	4–3	5–1	2–2	6–0
Leeds	1–4	1–3	5–2	2–3		1–0	4–2	2–1	2–2	1–0	1–2	2–0
Mossley Hill	0–6	1–2	3–2	0–1	0–1		2–3	3–4	1–1	4–0	3–1	6–0
Morecambe	1–4	1–5	3–2	2–1	2–3	3–1		3–0	3–1	2–1	4–1	1–3
Blackpool Wren Rovers	0–3	1–4	1–5	2–1	0–1	1–2	4–2		4–0	3–2	2–2	3–1
Chester-le-Street	1–1	1–5	2–1	2–3	0–0	1–2	5–0	1–3		2–2	6–2	4–2
Tranmere Rovers	1–2	1–5	1–2	1–1	4–1	1–2	2–1	3–4	6–2		0–4	6–1
Stockport County	2–4	3–4	0–2	1–3	3–0	2–4	5–5	8–2	1–3	1–2		1–0
Norton & Stockton Ancients	0–3	0–1	2–4	1–3	1–2	0–6	0–4	2–5	0–1	1–1	2–1	

Source: The Football Association
Legend: Blue = home team win; Yellow = draw; Red = away team win.

=== Midlands Division One ===
FA Women's Premier League Midlands Division One
- Season: 2015–16
- Champions: Leicester City
- Promoted: Leicester City
- Relegated: Peterborough Northern Star; Leafield Athletic

Map showing the locations of the teams in Midlands Division One of the FA Women's Premier League

Changes from last season:

- Loughborough Foxes were promoted to the Northern Division.
- Wolverhampton Wanderers were relegated from the Northern Division.
- Birmingham & West Midlands Police were promoted from the West Midlands Regional League and changed their name to Birmingham & West Midlands.
- Peterborough Northern Star were promoted from the East Midlands Regional League.
- Mansfield Town and Curzon Ashton were relegated to the regional leagues.

The teams competing this season are:

Team	Home ground	2014–15 position
Birmingham & West Midlands	Shenley Lane Community Sports Centre, Birmingham	1st in West Midlands Regional League (promoted)
Leafield Athletic	Triplex Sports Club	3rd
Leicester City Ladies	Linwood Playing Fields, Leicester	9th
Leicester City	Riverside Pavilion, Leicester	2nd
Loughborough Students	Holywell Park, Loughborough	5th
Peterborough Northern Star	Mick George Arena, Peterborough	1st in East Midlands Regional League (promoted)
Radcliffe Olympic	Wharf Lane Recreation Ground, Radcliffe-on-Trent	4th
Rotherham United	Roundwood Sports Complex, Rotherham	6th
Solihull	Field Lane, Solihull	7th
Sporting Khalsa	Aspray Arena, Willenhall	8th
Steel City Wanderers	Park Road, Worsbrough	10th
Wolverhampton Wanderers	Keys Park, Hednesford	12th in Northern Division (relegated)

==== League table ====
Pos	Team	Pld	W	D	L	GF	GA	GD	Pts	Promotion or relegation
1	Leicester City (C, P)	22	22	0	0	93	19	+74	66	Promotion to the Northern Division
2	Wolverhampton Wanderers	22	14	3	5	62	30	+32	45	
3	Radcliffe Olympic	22	11	5	6	52	29	+23	38	
4	Solihull	22	11	2	9	43	47	−4	35	
5	Birmingham & West Midlands	22	10	3	9	39	42	−3	33	
6	Loughborough Students	22	9	1	12	44	54	−10	28	
7	Steel City Wanderers	22	8	3	11	35	58	−23	27	
8	Leicester City Ladies	22	7	5	10	46	55	−9	26	
9	Rotherham United	22	7	3	12	42	53	−11	24	
10	Sporting Khalsa	22	6	2	14	27	53	−26	20	
11	Peterborough Northern Star (R)	22	5	4	13	37	44	−7	19	Relegation from the Premier League.
12	Leafield Athletic (R)	22	6	1	15	30	66	−36	19	Relegation from the Premier League.

Source: The Football Association
Rules for classification: 1) Points; 2) Goal difference; 3) Number of goals scored
(C) Champions; (P) Promoted; (R) Relegated

==== Results ====
Home \ Away	LCW	WOL	RAD	SOL	BWM	LST	SCW	LCL	ROT	SPK	PNS	LEA
Leicester City		3–2	3–2	7–0	5–3	3–1	3–0	3–1	10–0	4–0	5–2	5–1
Wolverhampton Wanderers	1–2		1–1	5–3	2–3	2–3	7–1	2–2	3–2	2–0	1–1	6–1
Radcliffe Olympic	1–2	0–3		2–2	1–2	4–1	1–1	3–3	6–1	0–2	2–0	2–0
Solihull	2–3	0–2	1–4		2–4	1–3	2–1	3–1	1–0	3–1	2–1	2–0
Birmingham & West Midlands	0–2	1–2	0–3	0–2		2–3	1–1	2–2	2–1	2–0	3–2	3–2
Loughborough Students	1–7	0–1	3–0	1–0	1–3		3–1	2–6	2–2	0–3	3–1	1–3
Steel City Wanderers	0–8	1–2	0–4	1–3	0–0	5–3		2–6	1–0	3–2	1–0	5–2
Leicester City Ladies	1–3	4–2	1–4	2–2	1–2	1–10	3–1		1–4	2–1	2–1	3–0
Rotherham United	0–4	0–4	1–2	2–3	3–0	0–2	5–1	3–3		2–3	6–2	3–1
Sporting Khalsa	0–5	0–6	0–3	0–3	1–4	3–1	1–2	1–0	2–3		1–1	2–4
Peterborough Northern Star	0–1	1–2	1–1	3–4	4–1	5–0	1–3	2–1	0–0	2–3		5–1
Leafield Athletic	1–5	1–4	1–6	4–2	2–1	1–0	1–4	2–0	0–4	1–1	1–2	

Source: The Football Association
Legend: Blue = home team win; Yellow = draw; Red = away team win.

=== South East Division One ===
FA Women's Premier League South East Division One
- Season: 2015–16
- Champions: Crystal Palace
- Promoted: Crystal Palace
- Relegated: Bedford

Map showing the locations of the teams in South East Division One of the FA Women's Premier League

Changes from last season:

- Gillingham were relegated from the Southern Division.
- Lowestoft Town and Old Actonians were promoted from the Eastern Region League and the London & South Eastern League respectively.
- C&K Basildon were promoted to the Southern Division.

The teams competing this season are:

Team	Home ground	2014–15 position
Bedford	Weston Park, Wootton	8th
Cambridge United	Unwin Sports Ground, Ely	7th
Crystal Palace	Hayes Lane, Bromley	3rd
Denham United	The Middlesex Stadium, Ruislip	6th
Enfield Town	Queen Elizabeth II Stadium, Enfield	5th
Gillingham	The Sports Ground, Chatham	11th in Southern Division (relegated)
Ipswich Town	Humber Doucy Lane, Rushmere, Ipswich	9th
Lowestoft Town	Crown Meadow, Lowestoft	1st in Eastern Region League (promoted)
Luton Town	Stockwood Park Athletics Stadium, Luton	4th
Milton Keynes Dons	Willen Road, Newport Pagnell	2nd
Norwich City	Plantation Park, Blofield	10th
Old Actonians	Berkeley Fields, Greenford, London	1st in London & South Eastern League (promoted)

==== League table ====
Pos	Team	Pld	W	D	L	GF	GA	GD	Pts	Promotion or relegation
1	Crystal Palace (C, P)	22	20	2	0	90	17	+73	62	Promotion to the Southern Division
2	Gillingham	22	16	3	3	84	20	+64	51	
3	Milton Keynes Dons	22	13	5	4	63	26	+37	44	
4	Luton Town	22	12	4	6	45	32	+13	40	
5	Ipswich Town	22	11	3	8	52	44	+8	36	
6	Cambridge United	22	10	5	7	54	24	+30	35	
7	Enfield Town	22	7	5	10	34	29	+5	26	
8	Norwich City	22	8	2	12	43	53	−10	26	
9	Denham United	22	6	5	11	26	35	−9	23	
10	Old Actonians	22	5	2	15	25	63	−38	17	
11	Lowestoft Town	22	2	3	17	17	97	−80	9	
12	Bedford (R)	22	2	1	19	16	109	−93	7	Relegated from the Premier League.

Source: The Football Association
Rules for classification: 1) Points; 2) Goal difference; 3) Number of goals scored
(C) Champions; (P) Promoted; (R) Relegated

==== Results ====
Home \ Away	CRY	GIL	MKD	LUT	IPS	CAM	ENF	NOR	DEN	OAC	LOW	BED
Crystal Palace		5–0	4–2	4–3	5–1	3–0	1–0	5–0	3–2	6–1	9–0	10–1
Gillingham	1–1		1–2	4–0	3–2	0–1	1–0	4–1	5–1	5–1	13–0	9–0
Milton Keynes Dons	1–4	1–2		1–1	0–3	2–1	2–2	2–1	2–1	6–0	11–0	3–1
Luton Town	1–2	2–4	1–2		0–2	2–1	3–0	3–2	3–0	4–2	2–0	3–1
Ipswich Town	1–3	1–2	0–3	2–2		1–7	3–1	3–4	0–2	3–1	2–2	9–0
Cambridge United	1–1	1–1	1–1	2–2	1–2		1–0	1–3	0–0	1–0	3–0	9–0
Enfield Town	0–2	0–0	1–2	0–1	3–4	1–0		0–0	1–1	1–1	5–0	3–2
Norwich City	0–3	0–8	0–4	2–4	2–3	3–1	0–1		2–0	5–1	2–2	5–1
Denham United	0–3	0–3	1–1	0–0	0–0	1–3	2–1	1–2		3–1	3–1	1–2
Old Actonians	0–5	0–3	1–1	0–2	1–2	1–4	0–6	3–2	1–0		3–0	2–1
Lowestoft Town	2–4	0–6	0–7	1–3	0–4	0–4	2–5	3–2	1–3	1–4		0–0
Bedford	0–7	1–9	0–6	0–3	2–4	0–11	1–3	0–5	0–4	2–1	2–4	

Source: The Football Association
Legend: Blue = home team win; Yellow = draw; Red = away team win.

=== South West Division One ===
FA Women's Premier League South West Division One
- Season: 2015–16
- Champions: Swindon Town
- Promoted: Swindon Town
- Relegated: N/A

Map showing the locations of the teams in South West Division One of the FA Women's Premier League

Changes from last season:

- Forest Green Rovers were promoted to the Southern Division.
- Keynsham Town were relegated from the Southern Division.
- Maidenhead United were promoted from the Southern Region League.
- Gloucester City and Swindon Spitfires were promoted from the South West Region League.

The teams competing this season are:

Team	Home ground	2014–15 position
Cheltenham Town	Petersfield Park, Cheltenham	8th
Chichester City	Oaklands Park, Chichester	7th
Exeter City	Minster Park, Exminster	2nd
Gloucester City^{[note]}	Fairmile Gardens, Longford	1st in South West Region League (promoted)
Keynsham Town	Crown Field, Keynsham	12th in Southern Division (relegated)
Larkhall Athletic	Plain Ham, Larkhall	5th
Maidenhead United	York Road, Maidenhead	1st in Southern Region League (promoted)
Shanklin	County Ground, Shanklin	6th
Southampton Saints	Silverlake Arena, Sholing	4th
St Nicholas	Lodge Road, Yate	9th
Swindon Spitfires^{[note]}	The Elms, Highworth	2nd in South West Region League (promoted)
Swindon Town	Barrington Park, Shrivenham	3rd

^note Gloucester City and Swindon Spitfires both withdrew from the league during the season. All results involving them were expunged.

==== League table ====
Pos	Team	Pld	W	D	L	GF	GA	GD	Pts	Promotion or relegation
1	Swindon Town (C, P)	18	15	2	1	49	12	+37	47	Promotion to the Southern Division
2	Chichester City	18	14	2	2	44	8	+36	44	
3	Keynsham Town	18	12	3	3	45	19	+26	39	
4	Larkhall Athletic	18	11	3	4	43	23	+20	36	
5	Exeter City	18	8	1	9	36	37	−1	25	
6	Southampton Saints	18	7	2	9	29	35	−6	23	
7	Maidenhead United	18	7	1	10	28	37	−9	22	
8	Cheltenham Town	18	4	0	14	17	49	−32	12	
9	Shanklin	18	3	0	15	16	54	−38	9	
10	St Nicholas	18	2	0	16	19	52	−33	6	
11	Gloucester City (X)	0	0	0	0	0	0	0	0	Resigned from league. Record expunged.
12	Swindon Spitfires (X)	0	0	0	0	0	0	0	0	Resigned from league. Record expunged.

Source: The Football Association
Rules for classification: 1) Points; 2) Goal difference; 3) Number of goals scored
(C) Champions; (P) Promoted; (X) Resigned

==== Results ====
Home \ Away	CHE	CHI	EXE	KEY	LAR	MAI	SHA	SOS	STN	SWT
Cheltenham Town		0–4	3–0	0–5	0–4	2–3	1–0	0–1	2–1	0–4
Chichester City	3–1		2–1	2–0	1–0	6–0	3–0	2–1	8–0	1–1
Exeter City	3–1	0–0		1–4	0–2	4–0	7–0	3–0	2–0	1–2
Keynsham Town	1–2	1–3	4–1		3–3	1–0	5–0	3–2	5–0	2–0
Larkhall Athletic	4–1	0–1	4–0	1–1		4–1	4–3	5–2	3–2	1–2
Maidenhead United	3–0	1–2	7–3	0–1	2–3		3–1	1–0	3–1	0–3
Shanklin	3–2	0–3	1–2	0–1	1–2	3–2		0–5	2–0	0–2
Southampton Saints	3–0	1–0	2–3	0–3	2–2	1–1	2–1		2–0	1–4
St Nicholas	3–1	0–3	2–5	3–4	0–1	0–1	2–1	2–3		2–3
Swindon Town	4–1	1–0	3–0	1–1	1–0	2–0	8–0	5–1	3–1	

Source: The Football Association
Legend: Blue = home team win; Yellow = draw; Red = away team win.
