= 2013–14 FA Women's Premier League =

FA Women's Premier League
- Season: 2013–14

The 2013–14 FA Women's Premier League season was the 23rd season of the former top flight of English women's association football.

== National Division ==
The creation of the FA WSL 2 lead to the abolishment of the Premier League National Division. Clubs were either approved for the FA WSL 1 or 2 or relegated to a Regional Division.

Changes from last season:

- Sunderland were approved for FA WSL 2
- Watford were approved for FA WSL 2
- Manchester City were approved for FA WSL 1
- Aston Villa were approved for FA WSL 2
- Barnet were approved for FA WSL 2
- Leeds United were relegated to the Northern Division
- Coventry City were relegated to the Southern Division
- Charlton Athletic were relegated to the Southern Division
- Cardiff City were relegated to the Southern Division
- Portsmouth were relegated to the Southern Division

== Northern Division ==
FA Women's Premier League Northern Division
- Season: 2013–14
- Champions: Sheffield
- Relegated: Leeds United
- Matches: 110
- Goals: 462 (4.2 per match)
- Biggest home win: Sheffield 7–0 Blackburn Rovers (8 September 2013)

Map showing the locations of the teams in the Northern Division of the FA Women's Premier League
Map showing the locations of the teams in the Northern Division of the FA Women's Premier League

Changes from last season:

- Stoke City were promoted from the Midlands Combination League
- Bradford City were promoted from the Northern Combination League
- Leeds United were relegated from the National Division

=== League table ===
Pos	Team	Pld	W	D	L	GF	GA	GD	Pts	Promotion or relegation
1	Sheffield (C)	20	17	2	1	74	15	+59	53	
2	Preston North End	20	12	1	7	49	39	+10	37	
3	Bradford City	20	11	2	7	36	33	+3	35	
4	Nottingham Forest	20	10	3	7	44	24	+20	33	
5	Stoke City	20	10	3	7	51	45	+6	33	
6	Sporting Club Albion	20	8	4	8	36	34	+2	28	
7	Derby County	20	7	4	9	45	51	−6	25	
8	Wolverhampton Wanderers	20	6	2	12	28	48	−20	20	
9	Blackburn Rovers	20	5	3	12	29	51	−22	18	
10	Newcastle United	20	5	2	13	33	66	−33	17	
11	Leeds United (R)	20	4	4	12	37	56	−19	16	Relegation to the Northern Division One

Source: FA WPL
(C) Champions; (R) Relegated

=== Results ===
Home \ Away	BLB	BRC	DER	LEU	NEW	NOT	PNE	SCA	SHE	STC	WOL
Blackburn Rovers	—	4–0	3–2	2–3	4–2	1–3	1–6	1–0	1–5	0–2	2–4
Bradford City	2–2	—	4–4	1–3	2–0	2–1	1–3	3–1	0–3	2–2	4–0
Derby County	0–2	0–2	—	5–2	4–0	0–4	2–1	2–1	2–2	1–3	5–3
Leeds United	1–1	3–0	5–3	—	1–4	0–3	3–3	1–4	2–3	2–5	1–1
Newcastle United	3–2	0–4	3–2	2–1	—	0–5	4–2	1–3	0–5	3–3	2–5
Nottingham Forest	2–0	0–1	1–2	3–2	2–2	—	3–4	3–3	0–1	1–2	1–2
Preston North End	1–0	5–0	2–5	5–2	2–1	0–1	—	4–1	0–5	3–1	3–1
Sporting Club Albion	1–1	0–2	2–2	1–1	6–2	0–3	3–0	—	2–1	2–1	4–0
Sheffield	7–0	1–0	4–0	6–2	7–1	0–0	3–1	5–0	—	7–1	3–0
Stoke City	5–1	2–4	4–4	2–1	4–2	2–4	1–2	1–0	3–4	—	3–1
Wolverhampton Wanderers	2–2	0–2	3–0	2–1	2–1	0–4	1–2	0–2	0–2	1–4	—

Source: FA WPL
Legend: Blue = home team win; Yellow = draw; Red = away team win.

== Southern Division ==
FA Women's Premier League Southern Division
- Season: 2014–15
- Champions: Coventry City
- Relegated: Chesham United
- Matches: 110
- Goals: 406 (3.69 per match)
- Biggest home win: Cardiff City 9–1 Chesham United (19 January 2014)
- Biggest away win: Chesham United 0–8 Gillingham (4 May 2014)

Map showing the locations of the teams in the Southern Division of the FA Women's Premier League
Map showing the locations of the teams in the Southern Division of the FA Women's Premier League

Changes from last season:

- Reading were approved for WSL 2
- Millwall Lionesses were approved for WSL 2
- Yeovil Town were approved for WSL 2
- Keynsham Town were promoted from the South West Combination League
- Chesham United were promoted from the South East Combination League
- Coventry City were relegated from the National Division
- Charlton Athletic were relegated from the Southern Division
- Cardiff City were relegated from the Southern Division
- Portsmouth were relegated from the Southern Division
- Queens Park Rangers were relegated to the South East Combination League
- Colchester United folded at the end of the season

=== League table ===
Pos	Team	Pld	W	D	L	GF	GA	GD	Pts	Promotion or relegation
1	Coventry City (C)	20	14	4	2	42	14	+28	46	Moved to the Northern Division
2	Gillingham	20	14	2	4	58	21	+37	44	
3	Cardiff City	20	12	4	4	55	24	+31	40	
4	Portsmouth	20	12	1	7	42	29	+13	37	
5	Charlton Athletic	20	9	5	6	39	35	+4	32	
6	Lewes	20	9	4	7	31	32	−1	31	
7	Brighton & Hove Albion	20	7	2	11	32	31	+1	23	
8	Tottenham Hotspur	20	6	4	10	27	36	−9	22	
9	Keynsham Town	20	6	1	13	40	52	−12	19	
10	West Ham United	20	4	3	13	25	48	−23	15	
11	Chesham United (R)	20	2	0	18	15	84	−69	6	Relegation to the Southern Region League First Division - Northern

Source: FA WPL
(C) Champions; (R) Relegated

=== Results ===
Home \ Away	BHA	CAR	CHA	CHE	CVC	GIL	KYT	LEW	POR	TOT	WHU
Brighton & Hove Albion	—	1–2	4–1	5–0	0–1	1–2	0–1	1–2	1–2	1–1	1–0
Cardiff City	3–0	—	2–2	9–1	1–2	0–0	4–3	1–1	3–2	4–0	4–1
Charlton Athletic	2–1	3–3	—	3–2	0–1	1–3	4–3	3–2	1–1	1–0	2–1
Chesham United	1–2	0–5	0–4	—	0–5	0–8	2–1	1–0	1–4	0–3	2–5
Coventry City	1–1	0–1	1–1	6–0	—	0–4	2–1	2–0	4–0	1–0	2–0
Gillingham	3–0	4–2	3–1	5–0	0–3	—	4–1	1–0	3–0	5–1	1–1
Keynsham Town	3–6	0–5	0–4	5–2	3–3	4–2	—	3–0	1–2	2–3	4–1
Lewes	0–6	2–1	2–1	3–0	1–1	3–1	2–0	—	2–1	1–1	5–1
Portsmouth	3–0	2–0	2–0	3–1	0–1	3–2	3–2	5–1	—	1–2	6–2
Tottenham Hotspur	3–0	0–2	2–2	5–1	0–3	0–4	1–2	1–3	0–1	—	3–1
West Ham United	0–1	0–3	2–3	3–1	1–3	0–3	2–1	1–1	2–1	1–1	—

Source: FA WPL
Legend: Blue = home team win; Yellow = draw; Red = away team win.
