= South East Combination Women's Football League =

- Founded: 1998
- Folded: 2014
- Country: England
- Divisions: 1
- Number of clubs: 11
- Level on pyramid: 4
- Feeder to: FA Women's Premier League Southern Division
- Relegation to: Eastern Region Women's Football League; London and South East Women's Regional Football League
- Last champions: Queens Park Rangers (2013–14)
- Website: Official website

The South East Combination Women's Football League, also known simply as the South East Combination, was a women's football league in England from 1998 to 2014. Until the creation of the FA Women's Super League in 2011, they sat at the third level of English women's football pyramid along with the three other Combination Leagues - South West, Midland and Northern. The South East Combination fed into the FA Women's Premier League Southern Division, and lied above the Eastern Region Women's Football League and the London and South East Women's Regional Football League in the pyramid. For the 2014–15 season the South East Combination was incorporated into the newly re-structured FA Women's Premier League as the FA WPL South East Division One.

== Previous winners ==
Season	Winner
1998–99	Wembley Mill Hill
1999–2000	Chelsea
2000–01	Fulham
2001–02	Enfield
2002–03	Watford
2003–04	Crystal Palace
2004–05	West Ham United
2005–06	Barnet
2006–07	Colchester United
2007–08	Ipswich Town
2008–09	Luton Town
2009–10	Gillingham
2010–11	Tottenham Hotspur
2011–12	Lewes
2012–13	Chesham United
2013–14	Queens Park Rangers
