= Lewes F.C. Women =

Association football club in Sussex, England

- Full name: Lewes Football Club Women
- Nickname: The Rooks
- Founded: 2002; 24 years ago
- Ground: The Dripping Pan, Lewes
- Capacity: 2,801 (600 seated)
- Manager: Emma Byrne
- League: FA Women's National League South
- 2025–26: FA Women's National League South, 5th of 12
- Website: lewesfc.com/women
Home colours	Away colours

Lewes Football Club Women is a women's football club affiliated with Lewes F.C. The club compete in the FA Women's National League South and play at The Dripping Pan. The team's highest ever league finish was 5th place in the second-tier FA Women's Championship in 2020–21.

== History ==
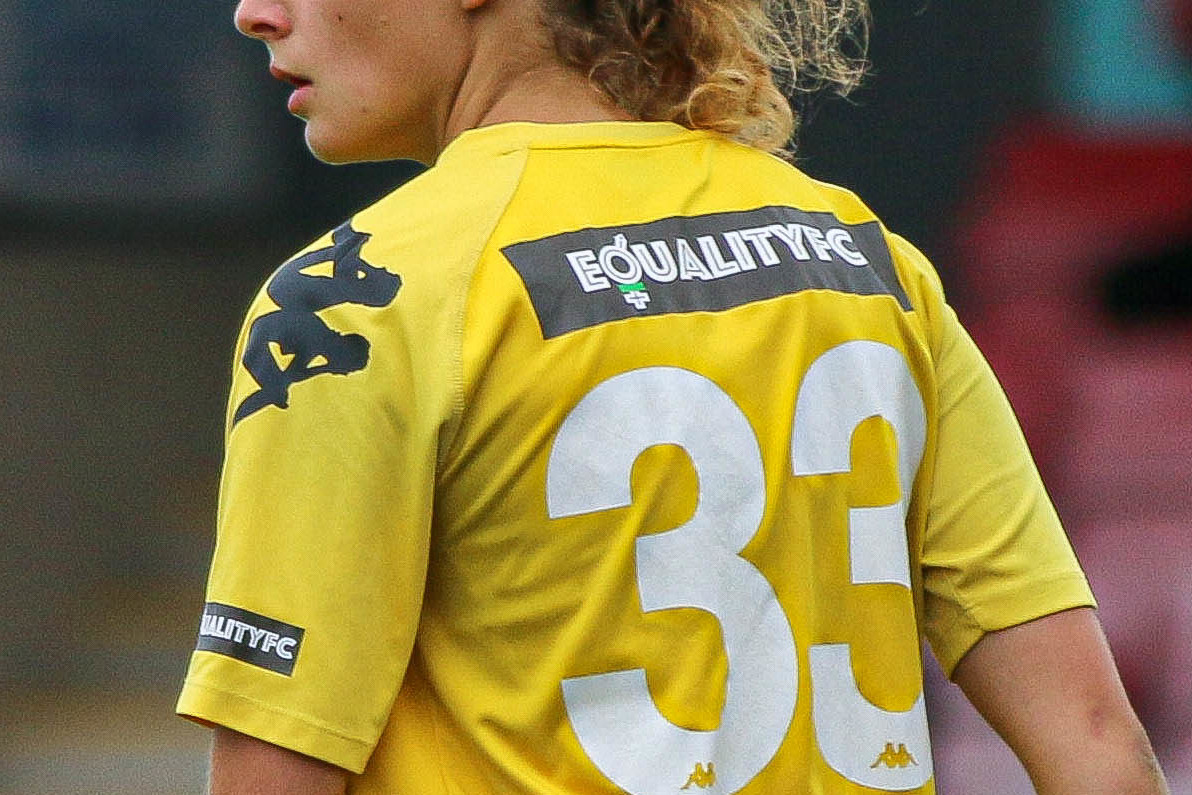
"Equality FC" badges on Lewes kit in 2020

Lewes Ladies FC was established in 2002 as the women's affiliate of Lewes FC, a not-for-profit club helping pioneer 100% fan and community ownership. The team started playing in the South East Counties football league and within a ten-year period climbed through the pyramid, winning promotion to the fourth-tier FA Women's Premier League in 2012 following an unbeaten season.

In 2017, Lewes became the first professional or semi-professional football club to pay its women's team the same as its men's team as part of their Equality FC initiative.

In 2018, the team was awarded a place in the FA Women's Championship. In September 2019 club director Barry Collins resigned, frustrated at the board's preoccupation with equality campaigning: "I joined a football club and feel like I'm leaving a political party".

== Managerial history ==
Name	Nationality	From	To	Ref.
Jacquie Agnew	England	2002	June 2014	
John Donoghue	England	June 2014	November 2018	
Fran Alonso	Spain	December 2018	January 2020	
Simon Parker	England	January 2020	October 2021	
Scott Booth	Scotland	May 2022	April 2024	
Natalie Lawrence	England	July 2024	June 2025	
Emma Byrne	Ireland	July 2025		

== Current squad ==
As of 22 August 2026

Note: Flags indicate national team as defined under FIFA eligibility rules; some limited exceptions apply. Players may hold more than one non-FIFA nationality.

No.	Pos.	Nation	Player
1	GK	CAN	Emily Moore
2	DF	UGA	Beth Kaluya
3	DF	ENG	Flo Jackson
4	MF	ENG	Sydney Schreimaier
5	DF	PAK	Layla Banaras
6	FW	JAM	Una Lue
7	MF	ENG	Kayla Ginger
8	MF	ENG	Paris Dalton
9	FW	ENG	Chelsea Ferguson
10	FW	WAL	Emma Jones

No.	Pos.	Nation	Player
11	MF	ENG	Liv Carpenter
14	FW	ENG	Paula Howells
16	DF	ENG	Ella Stephens
20	FW	ENG	Brèon Grant
21	FW	ENG	Olivia Johnson (on loan from Brighton & Hove Albion)
22	FW	IRL	Millie Pullen
23	DF	ENG	Ylenia Priest
24	DF	ENG	Lois Edwards
25	GK	ENG	Frankie Angel
77	DF	ENG	Scarlett Kagalwala

== Season summary ==
Key

- QF = Quarter-finals
- SF = Semi-finals

Champions	Runners-up	Promoted	Relegated

Results of league and cup competitions by season
Season	Division	P	W	D	L	F	A	Pts	Pos	FA Cup
Season	League									FA Cup
2002–03										
2003–04	SEC	16	7	6	3	26	21	27	3rd	
2004–05	SEC	18	10	5	3	35	14	35	3rd	R2
2005–06	LSEWRFL	22	18	1	3	85	20	55	2nd	
2006–07	LSEWRFL	20	18	1	1	68	15	55	1st	
2007–08										
2008–09										
2009–10										R3
2010–11										R1
2011–12										R2
2012–13	WPL South	18	7	2	9	23	24	23	5th	R2
2013–14	WPL South	20	9	4	7	31	32	31	6th	R3
2014–15	WPL South	22	6	3	13	31	37	21	7th	R3
2015–16	WPL South	22	8	1	13	30	42	25	7th	R3
2016–17	WPL South	20	7	4	9	31	36	25	7th	R3
2017–18	WPL South	22	14	2	6	45	25	44	5th	R5
2018–19	Championship	20	5	2	13	23	47	17	9th	R4
2019–20	Championship	12	2	3	7	10	18	9	8th	R5
2020–21	Championship	20	8	4	8	19	22	28	5th	R4
2021–22	Championship	22	9	2	11	23	24	29	8th	R3
2022–23	Championship	22	7	5	10	20	29	26	9th	QF
2023–24	Championship	22	4	4	14	22	39	16	11th	R3
2024–25	National League	22	8	7	7	37	28	31	6th	R3
2025–26	National League	22	12	1	9	46	27	37	5th	R3

== See also ==
- Category:Lewes F.C. Women players
- Football in Sussex
