= Paula Howells =

English footballer

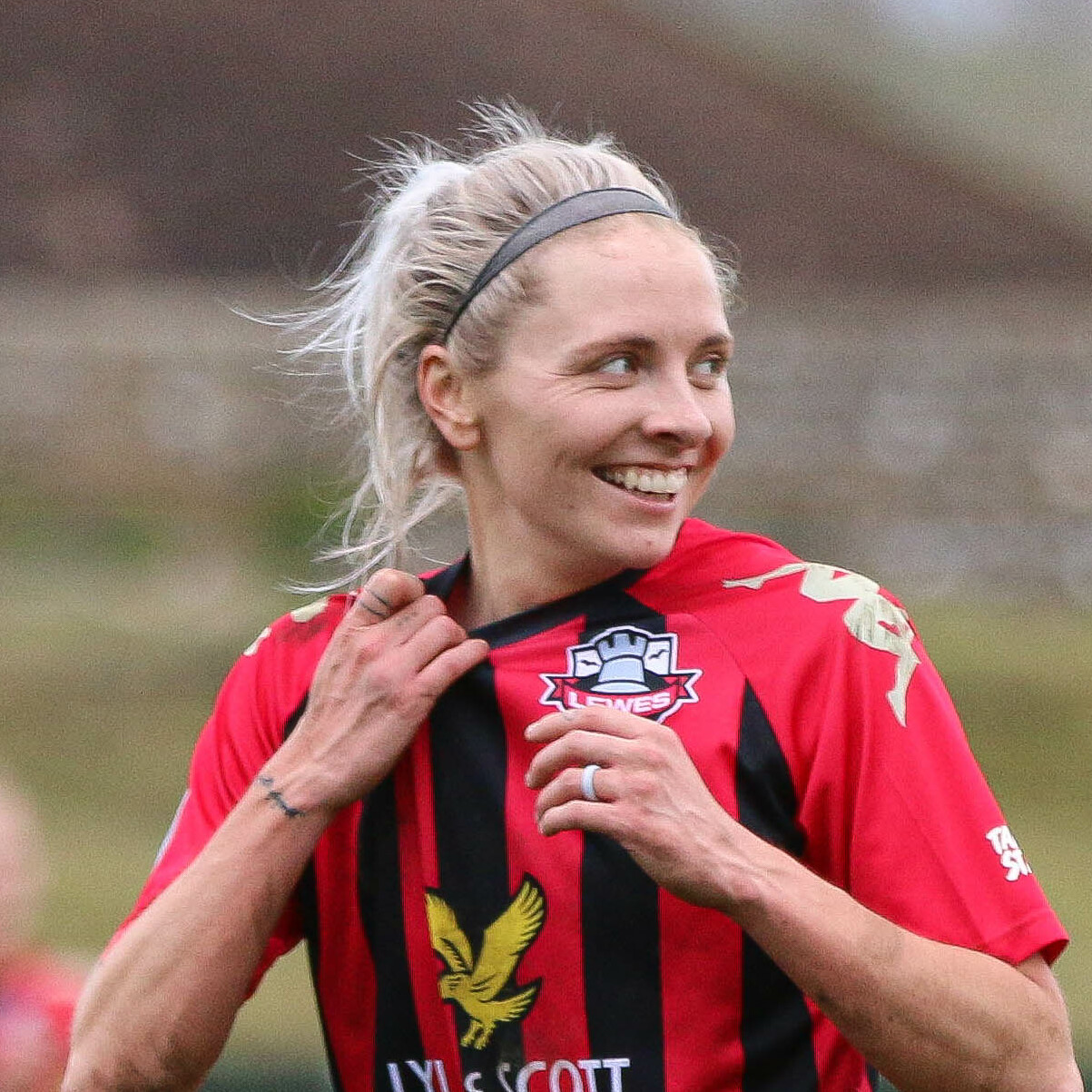
- Howells in 2022

Personal information
- Full name: Paula Howells
- Date of birth: 22 March 1997 (age 29)
- Place of birth: Sussex, England
- Position: Midfielder

Team information
- Current team: Lewes
- Number: 14

Senior career*
Years	Team	Apps	(Gls)
–2014	Brighton & Hove Albion	0	(0)
2014–2019	London Bees	105	(20)
2019–	Lewes	65	(13)

International career^{‡}
2019	England U19	9	(0)
2019–2021	England U23	3	(0)
- * Club domestic league appearances and goals as of 29 April 2025 ‡ National team caps and goals as of 19 August 2025

Paula Howells (born 22 March 1997) is an English footballer who plays as a midfielder for the FA Women's National League South club Lewes. She has previously played for England Under 19s and 23s and for the London Bees.

== Life ==
Howells was born on 22 March 1997 in Sussex. Growing up, she was an Arsenal fan as a child, and in particular admired their striker Thierry Henry, emulating his style of football. When she was at school, she suffered early with discrimination against her as a female footballer. At her school when she was thirteen (and already a better footballer than any boy in her school), the boys of the school were allowed to take the afternoon off school to watch the men's England team play - this was not the same for the girls and represented the inequality that was prevalent in football at that time as the girls were expected to attend normal schooling.

She protested and campaigned against the decision as Howells wanted to watch her heroes in the World Cup, but this made no difference, and as a result Howells ended up in trouble with the teachers at the school.

Howells currently plays for Lewes FC Women, based at The Dripping Pan, where she plays on the same pitch as Lewes FC Men's team, sharing the same training and coaching facilities, with equal marketing resources behind her and her team-mates.

== Club career ==
=== Brighton ===
Howells played for Brighton & Hove Albion until July 2014.

=== London Bees ===
She joined London Bees in 2014.

In 2017, Howells started playing with FA Women's Championship club London Bees, playing as an attacking midfielder and making seventeen appearances. She got her only yellow card that season and she scored six goals. In the next season she scored just one goal but was only present in four line ups.

=== Lewes ===
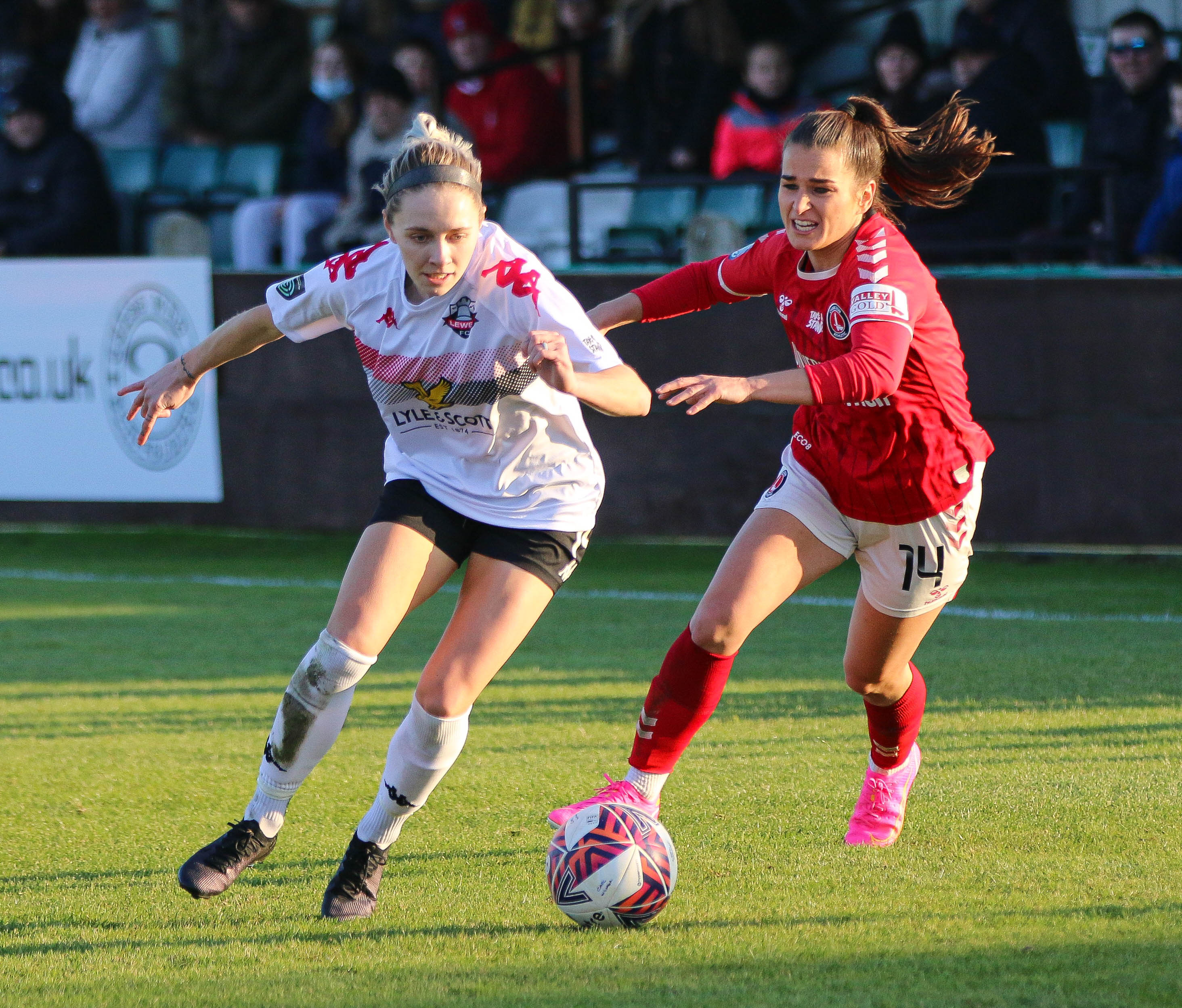
Howells vs Megan Wynne of Charlton Athletic WFC in January 2022

In 2019, She joined Lewes. The team are unusual as they pay their men's team and their women's team the same amount. The matches cost the same to see and Howells has noted that the women and men practice together regularly, something which benefits all of the players training. She is a midfielder who scores goals - in October 2021 she scored the opening goal against Charlton Athletic, a long range goal to open the score line. She scored another against Coventry when her team beat them 4–1.

In June 2023, Howells announced her departure from Lewes, citing "sadly, the women's game hasn't grown enough yet for people like myself to not struggle each day, especially with the current climate."

== International career ==
Howells has been capped by England at two youth levels. In 2016 she appeared for the England under-19 team; once in a draw with Sweden and again in a win over Austria.

She received her first call up for an under-23 match in 2018 for a goalless draw against the USA.

== Other ==
Howells is a firm proponent of mental health, and helped to organise her teammates to support a virtual Bingo night during the COVID pandemic to support MindOut. MindOut is a mental health charity that supports the LGBTQ community.
