= Women's National League South =

Third-level English women's football league

FA Women's National League Southern Premier
- Sport: Football
- Founded: 1992
- No. of teams: 12
- Countries: England and Wales
- Most recent champion: Watford (2 titles) (2025–26)
- Level on pyramid: 3
- Promotion to: Women's Super League 2
- Relegation to: FA Women's National League Division One South West, FA Women's National League Division One South East
- 2026–27 FA Women's National League

The Women's National League South, currently known as the FA Women's National League Southern Premier is a league in the third level in the women's football pyramid in England, along with the Northern Premier division. These two divisions are part of the FA Women's National League and below the Women's Super League and Women's Super League 2.

The league is played on a home and away basis, with each team playing each other twice, and points being awarded in the standard three points for a win format. The bottom two clubs are relegated, also on a geographical basis, to the Division One South West, and Division One South East.

For the 2023/24 season, changes were made meaning that two clubs would be relegated from the Women's Championship allowing one team each from National League Northern Premier and Southern Premier to be promoted to the Championship rather than having to play a season end playoff. This change resulted in two teams being relegated from the Championship at the end of the season.

Southern Premier Division teams are eligible to play in the Women's National League Cup as well as the Women's FA Cup.

== Name ==
It was known as the 'Women's Premier League Southern Division' before the 2018–19 season.

== Clubs ==
The following twelve clubs are competing in the 2026–27 season.

Club	Home ground	Position 2025–26
AFC Bournemouth	Long Lane, Ringwood	3rd
AFC Wimbledon	Imperial Fields, Morden	10th
Cheltenham Town	Kayte Lane, Bishop's Cleeve	8th
Exeter City	Coach Road, Newton Abbot	7th
Fulham	Motspur Park, New Malden	Division One South East, 1st
Hashtag United	Parkside, Aveley	9th
Lewes	The Dripping Pan, Lewes	5th
Oxford United	Marsh Lane, Marston	4th
Plymouth Argyle	Home Park, Plymouth	2nd
Portsmouth	Fratton Park, Portsmouth	WSL 2, 12th
Real Bedford	McMullen Park, Bedford	6th
Swindon Town	County Ground, Swindon	Division One South West, 1st

Location of Southern Premier Division clubs for the 2026–27 season

== Previous winners ==
Season	Club
1991–92	Arsenal
1992–93	District Line
1993–94	Bromley Borough
1994–95	Maidstone Tigress
1995–96	Southampton Saints
1996–97	Berkhamsted Town
1997–98	Ilkeston Town
1998–99	Reading Royals
1999–2000	Barry Town
2000–01	Brighton & Hove Albion
2001–02	Fulham
2002–03	Bristol Rovers (later Bristol Academy, now Bristol City)
2003–04	Bristol City (later AFC Team Bath, now defunct)
2004–05	Chelsea
2005–06	Cardiff City
2006–07	Watford
2007–08	Fulham
2008–09	Millwall Lionesses
2009–10	Barnet
2010–11	Charlton Athletic
2011–12	Portsmouth
2012–13	Reading
2013–14	Coventry City
Promotion to Women's Championship via NL play-off
2014–15	Portsmouth
2015–16	**Brighton & Hove Albion**
2016–17	**Tottenham Hotspur**
2017–18	**Charlton Athletic**
2018–19	**Coventry United**
2019–20	not awarded
2020–21	not awarded
2021–22	**Southampton F.C.**
2022–23	**Watford**
Automatic promotion to Women's Super League 2
2023–24	**Portsmouth**
2024–25	**Ipswich Town**
2025–26	Watford

From the 2014–15 season until the 2023–24 season, the winning team from the National League South took part in a play-off game against the winning team of the Northern Division of the National League. The overall winner of this match was promoted to the Women's Championship. The overall champions of the FA Women's National League, the teams promoted in this period, are marked in bold.

From the 2023–24 season onwards, the English FA decided to remove the play-off between the two winners of the National League divisions, with both teams being promoted to the Women's Championship.

== See also ==
- Women's association football
- List of women's football teams
- International competitions in women's association football
