= Morecambe FC Women =

Morecambe Ladies FC
- Full name: Morecambe Ladies Football Club
- Founded: 2005; 21 years ago
- Chairman: Nick Barrett
- Manager: Tom Smith
- League: North West Women's Regional Football League Division One
- 2022–23: North West Women's Regional Football League Division One, 7th of 12
- Website: http://www.morecambeladiesfc.com
Home colours	Away colours

Morecambe Ladies FC were established in 2005, originally named Lancaster & Morecambe Ladies FC. Sophie Fish set up the club to enable local girls to play football due to a lack of female clubs at that time. Two years after the club was formed they were approached by Morecambe FC to join the men's club.

== History ==
=== 2022 - ===
On September 15, 2022 Morecambe F.C. announced a partnership with Morecambe LFC to formally bring them into the clubs fold and rename them to Morecambe F.C. Women.

== Kit and main sponsors ==
Period	Kit Manufacturer	Shirt Sponsor
2005-22		
2022-		Tyson Fury

== Players ==
=== Current squad ===
As of 7 April 2023

Note: Flags indicate national team as defined under FIFA eligibility rules; some limited exceptions apply. Players may hold more than one non-FIFA nationality.

No.	Pos.	Nation	Player
—	GK		Erin Lightfoot
—	GK		Caitlin Currie
—	DF		Lucy Middleton
—	DF		Rebecca Baldwin
—	DF		Amy Fisher
—	DF		Olivia Thompson
—	DF		Ysabel McGrath
—	DF		Amy Hawker
—	DF		Amy Cambray
—	DF		Charlotte Townley
—	MF		Gabrielle Johnson

No.	Pos.	Nation	Player
—	MF		Colby Davidson
—	MF		Olivia Jenkinson
—	MF		Charlotte Gray
—	MF		Deborah Holyoak
—	MF		Alicia Trewin
—	MF		Natasha Walker
—	MF		Eleanor Townsend
—	FW		Izzy Munro
—	FW		Olivia Greene
—	FW		Hannah Priestley
—	FW		Olivia Thompson
—	FW		Nat Broad

== Best Performances ==
- FA Women's National League Division One North
  - 7th Place: 2016-17, 2017-18
