= Cambridge United W.F.C. =

Women's football club from Cambridge, England

Cambridge United
- Full name: Cambridge United Woman Football Club
- Nickname(s): The U's
- Short name: CUWFC
- Founded: 1992; 33 years ago
- Ground: Rowley Park; Abbey Stadium
- Capacity: 3,500 (250 seated); Rowley Park
- Chairman: Gisela Otten
- Manager: Sean Greygoose
- League: FA Women's National League Division One South East
- 2024–25: FA Women's National League Division One South East, 9th of 12
- Website: www.cambridgeunited.com
Home colours	Away colours

Cambridge United Women Football Club is an English women's football club based in the city of Cambridge, England. The team compete in the FA Women's National League Division One South East, with home games played at Rowley Park, St Neots Town.

== History ==
Cambridge United Women Football Club was formed in 1992. The club won the 1993–94 Eastern Region Division Two, and were promoted to Division One. The club won the 2004–05 Eastern Region League Cup, beating Colchester United 3–1 in the final. On 31 May 2022, Jenny Horsfield was announced as Chair of the club's new Women's Football Board.

Cambridge United reached the final of the 2023–24 FA National League Plate, their first national cup final, losing 3–0 to Derby County. On 25 June 2025, Gisela Otten was announced as new Chair of the Women's Football Board.

== Stadium ==
Cambridge United play their home games at Rowley Park, St Neots. The club also play select matches at the Abbey Stadium.

== Players ==
=== Current squad ===
As of 30 August 2025.

Note: Flags indicate national team as defined under FIFA eligibility rules; some limited exceptions apply. Players may hold more than one non-FIFA nationality.

No.	Pos.	Nation	Player
1	GK	ENG	Lauren Webb
2	DF	ENG	Tally Miles
3	DF	ENG	Lauren Tomlinson
4	DF	ENG	Brooklyn Cheal-Ferris
5	DF	ENG	Lauren Rouse
7	MF	ENG	Mia Richards
8	MF	ENG	Alysha Stojko-Down
9	FW	ENG	Molly Coupar
10	FW	ENG	Jade Bell
11	FW	ENG	Shannon Shaw
12	MF	ENG	Sammy Edgar

No.	Pos.	Nation	Player
13	GK	ENG	Sophie Shults
14	DF	ENG	Josephine Jarvis
16	FW	ENG	Emilia Reinhardt
17	DF	ENG	Florence Hjaltun-Rayner
18	FW	ENG	Kim Farrow
19	FW	ENG	Millie Docking
20	MF	ENG	Rebecca Stephenson
22	MF	ENG	Molly Sutherland
24	MF	ENG	Ella Marden
27	MF	ENG	Zoe Wood
38	FW	ENG	Bella Simmons

== Club management ==
=== Managerial history ===
Name	Years
Kevin Hoover	2017–19
Ben Yeomans	2019–21
Darren Marjoram	2021–25
Sean Greygoose	2025–

== Honours and achievements ==
League

- Eastern Region Division Two (level 5)
  - Champions: 1993–94

Cup

- Eastern Region League Cup
  - Winners: 2004–05
