= Leafield Athletic F.C. =

English women's football club

Leafield Athletic FC
- Founded: 1997
- Ground: Dickens Heath Sports Club
- Manager: Tash Tezgel
- League: FA Women's National League Division One Midlands
- 2024–25: FA Women's National League Division One Midlands, 4th of 12

Leafield Athletic Ladies F.C. is a women's football club based in Solihull, West Midlands, England. The team compete in the FA Women's National League, Division One Midlands. The club play home games at Dickens Heath Sports Club, in Earlswood.

Leafield Athletic Ladies FC also have 15 youth teams, offering football for girls from Under-7s up to Under-18s.

The team was promoted to the National League in 2019, following their 1–0 win over Goldenhill Wanderers.

== Committee members ==
List of Leafield Athletic Ladies FC committee members for the 2024-25 season.

Name	Season	Position
(England) Nick Henry	2019-2025	Chairman / Treasurer
(England) Adrian Clements	2018-2025	Director of Football / Vice Chair
(England) Neive Fallon	2020-2021	Under 18s Manager
(England) Daniel Hearnden	2020-2025	Secretary
Chantel Hunter	2024-25	Welfare and Safeguarding
Laura Broadbent	2024-25	Welfare and Safeguarding
Adil Abrar	2024-25	Marketing and Fundraising
