= Luton Town L.F.C. =

Women's association football club in Luton, England

Luton Town Ladies
- Full name: Luton Town Ladies Football Club
- Nickname: The Hatters
- Founded: 1997; 29 years ago
- Ground: Sharpenhoe Road; Kenilworth Road (select games)
- Capacity: Sharpenhoe Road: 4,000 (160 seated); Kenilworth Road: 12,056
- Chairman: Mark Wareham
- Manager: Daniel Bolesta
- League: FA Women's National League Division One South East
- 2025–26: FA Women's National League Division One South East, 7th of 12
- Website: www.lutontownladiesfc.co.uk
Home colours	Away colours

Luton Town Ladies Football Club (/ˈluːtən/) is a semi-professional women's football club based in the town of Luton, Bedfordshire, England. Founded in 1997, Luton competes in the FA Women's National League South East Division One, with home games played at Sharpenhoe Road in a groundshare with Barton Rovers. The club is affiliated with the Bedfordshire County Football Association.

Luton achieved successive promotions from the fifth tier Southern Region Division One South, and the fourth tier Southern Region Premier Division during the 2003–04 and 2004–05 seasons. The club was promoted to the second tier after winning the 2008–09 South East Combination, but relegated after just one season. After nine years in the FA Women's National League South East Division One, the club was relegated at the end of the 2018–19 season. The club was promoted back to the FA Women's National League at the end of the 2024-25 season.

== History ==
=== Formation and league development (1997–2010) ===
Luton Town Ladies Football Club was founded in 1997. After forming a partnership with Luton Town in 2000, the name Luton Town Belles was adopted in 2001, before the current name in 2006. The club achieved a third place finish in their inaugural season, the 2001–02 Southern Region Division One North. Luton were promoted to the Southern Region Premier Division after finishing the 2003–04 season as runners-up. The club achieved a second promotion to the South West Combination following a runners-up finish in the 2004–05 season. The club won the 2008–09 South East Combination, and were promoted to the FA Women's Premier League Northern Division. Luton were relegated back to the South East Combination at the end of the 2009–10 season.

=== Recent history (2010–present) ===
As a result of the restructuring of the FA Women's Premier League for the 2014–15 season, Luton competed in the newly formed FA Women's Premier League South East Division One. The club made their debut at Kenilworth Road on 15 October 2014, with a 2–1 win against Bedford. Luton reached the final of the 2017–18 FA Premier League Plate, but lost 5–0 to West Ham United. The club were relegated to the Eastern Region Football League at the end of the 2018–19 season. Rob Burton was appointed manager in June 2022. Luton won the 2022–23 Eastern Region League Cup, beating Stevenage 2–1 in the final. In 2023-24, Luton Town achieved their best ever performance in the Women's FA Cup - reaching the fourth round proper before being eliminated by Women's Super League side Brighton & Hove Albion.

In 2024-25, Luton Town achieved promotion from the Eastern Region Women's Football League, securing a league and cup double on their way to the fourth tier. The promotion saw the team play in the FA Women's National League Division One South East in 2025-26.

== Stadium ==
For much of Luton's early history, the club played their home games at Stockwood Park Athletics Centre. In January 2019, the club moved to The Brache, the training ground of the men's team. In October 2022, the club moved to Sharpenhoe Road, shared with Barton Rovers in Barton-le-Clay, Bedfordshire. With their partnership with the men's team, Luton also play some home games at Kenilworth Road and are expected to play at the new Power Court Stadium upon construction.

== Players ==
=== Current squad ===
As of 21 September 2026.

Note: Flags indicate national team as defined under FIFA eligibility rules; some limited exceptions apply. Players may hold more than one non-FIFA nationality.

No.	Pos.	Nation	Player
—	GK	ENG	Nicole Melling
—	GK	ENG	Maelie Jay Rance
—	GK	ENG	Leah Robinson
—	GK	ENG	Freya Upson
—	DF	ENG	Mya Banks
—	DF	ENG	Ruby Heselden
—	DF	ENG	Lisa Milliken
—	DF	ENG	Amy Reed
—	DF	ENG	Sasha Smith
—	DF	ENG	Chloe Tambula
—	DF	ENG	Ryah Vyse

No.	Pos.	Nation	Player
—	MF	ENG	Andie Dickens
—	MF	HUN	Erika Lempek
—	MF	ENG	Jessica Short
—	MF	IRL	Shianne Swarres (captain)
—	FW	ENG	Ella-Mai Bale
—	FW	ENG	Lucy Bolitho
—	FW	NZL	Katie Chellenbron
—	FW	WAL	Keira Harris
—	FW	ENG	Chloe Logie
—	FW	ENG	Amy McLean
—	FW	ENG	Carla Todd
—	FW	ENG	Emily Wilson (vice-captain)
—	FW	ENG	Georgia Wood

=== Out on loan ===
Note: Flags indicate national team as defined under FIFA eligibility rules; some limited exceptions apply. Players may hold more than one non-FIFA nationality.

No.	Pos.	Nation	Player
—	DF	POR	Catarina Pita (at St Albans City Women until 30 June 2027)

=== Former players ===
For details of former players, see Category:Luton Town L.F.C. players.

== Backroom staff ==
As of 21 March 2025.

=== Directors ===
- Chairman: Mark Wareham
- Secretary: David Baker
- General Manager: Nikki Baker
- General Manager: Sarah Hudson

=== Management ===
- Head Coach: Daniel Bolesta
- Assistant Coach: Clare Howe
- Assistant Coach: Jamie McCarry
- Goalkeeping Coach: Jack Messinger
- Strength & Conditioning Coach: Mikael Edubatey
- Physio: Tia Steadman
- Development Manager: Jack Manzi

== Managers ==
As of 7 July 2026

Dates	Name
2001–2013	(England) David Baker
2013–2022	(England) Nikki Baker
2022–2024	(England) Robert Burton
2024	(England) Myles Maddix
2024-2025	(England) Myles Maddix
2024-2025	(England) Fadi Mazloum
2025-2026	(England) Myles Maddix
2026-	(Poland) Daniel Bolesta

== Honours ==
League

- South East Combination League (level 3)
  - Champions: 2008–09
- Eastern Region Women's Football League Premier Division (level 5)
  - Champions: 2024-25

Cup

- Eastern Region League Cup
  - Champions: 2022–23; 2024-25
- Bedfordshire Women's Senior Cup
  - Champions: 2013–14; 2015–16; 2016-17; 2022-23
