= Hounslow W.F.C. =

Former football club in London, England

Coordinates: 51°30′50.63″N 0°27′27.73″W

Hounslow Women
- Full name: Hounslow Women Football Club
- Nickname: Tridents
- Founded: May 2001; 24 years ago
- Dissolved: 2023
- Ground: Tithe Farm, Harrow
- Capacity: 3,000
- Chairman: Miguel De'Souza
- Manager: Martino Chevannes
Home colours	Away colours	Third colours

Hounslow Women Football Club was an English football club based in London. The club was founded from a merger of Wembley Mill Hill F.C. and QPR Women F.C. in May 2001. The club was formerly known as QPR Women F.C until June 2018. The club is currently a member of the and play home matches at Rayners Lane F.C.'s ground, Tithe Farm in Harrow.

It was known as Queens Park Rangers Ladies Football Club from the merger until a name change in June 2018 to Queens Park Rangers Women Football Club.

The Main club made the decision to form its own new women's team for the start of the 2019/20 season which it named QPR FC Women who currently play their football in the London and South East Women's Regional Football League. The old Queens Park Rangers Women FC who were not under the umbrella of the football club at the time then made the decision to change their name to Hounslow Women FC with effect from the 2019/20 season.

In February 2023 Hounslow withdrew from the National League having lost eleven out of eleven games. Their results were expunged and the club was relegated to London and South East Women's Regional Football League Division 1 North. The team would be dissolved in the summer of 2023.

== Honours ==
- South East Combination Women's Football League
  - Winners: 2013–14
  - Runners-up: 2002–03
- Middlesex County FA Women's Senior Cup
  - Winners: 2009–10
  - Finalists: 2001–02, 2002–03, 2004–05, 2010–11
- South West Combination League Cup
  - Winners: 2006–07
- Capital Women's Senior Cup
  - Winners: 2020–21
  - Runners Up: 2013-14
