= Chatham Town F.C. Women =

English women's football club

Coordinates: 51.399139°N 0.467197°E

- Founded: as Borstal '88
- Ground: Bauvil Stadium, Chatham
- Chairman: Kevin Hake
- Manager: Vicky Ashton-Jones (Interim Manager)
- League: FA Women's National League Division One South East
- 2024–25: FA Women's National League Division One South East, 3rd of 12
Home colours

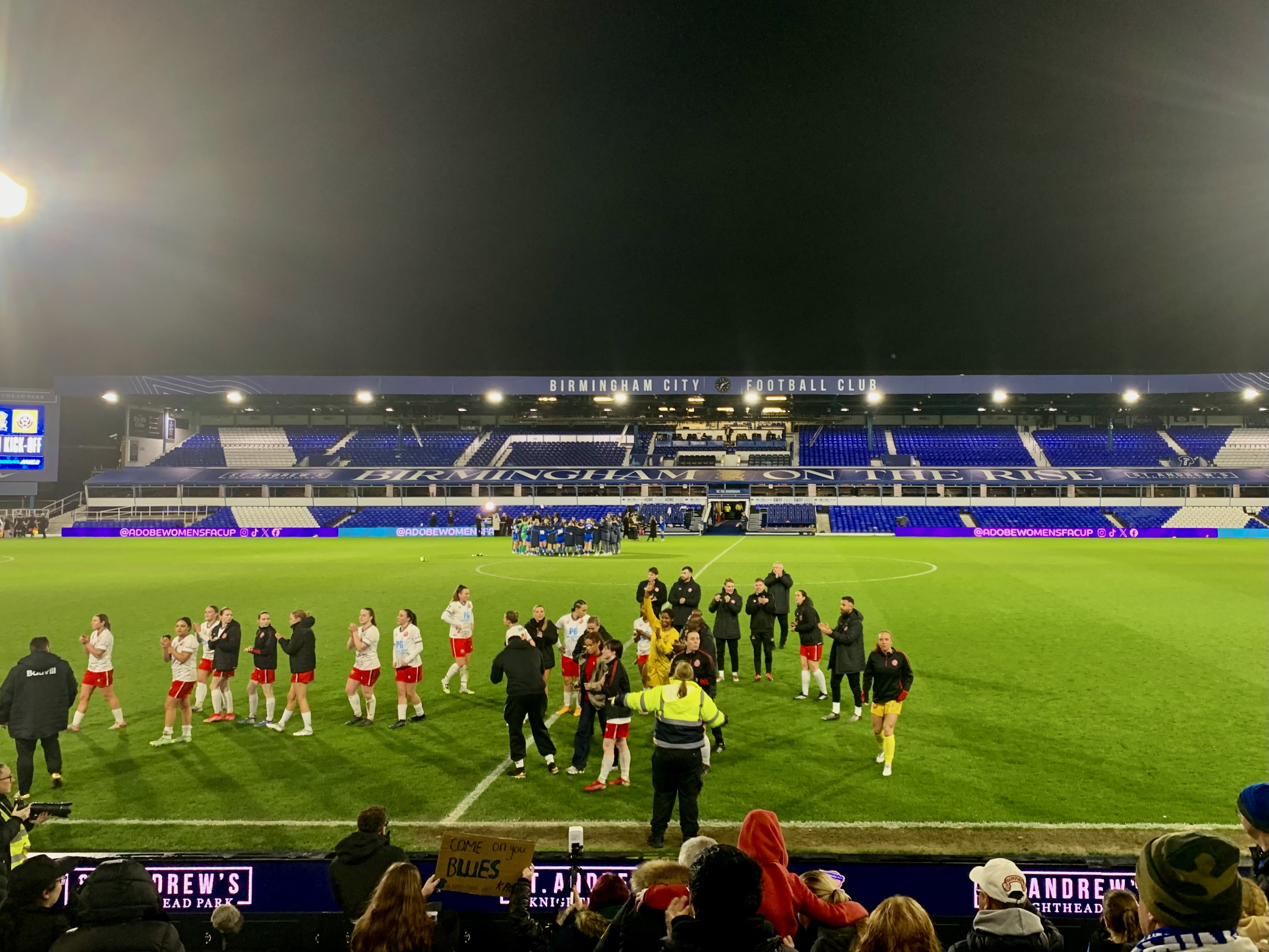
Chatham Town women after the 2025–26 FA Cup fifth round tie at Birmingham City Women

Chatham Town Women, previously known as Gillingham Football Club Women, is an English women's football club. The club compete in the and stage home matches at the Bauvill Stadium in Chatham, Kent.

== History ==
In 1995, Gillingham F.C. owner Paul Scally co-opted a local women's football team called Borstal '88.

In June 2014, the team was brought back under the banner of the men's football club, Gillingham F.C., after a period as an independent outfit. Following this takeover, the club became known as Gillingham Ladies and played home games at Priestfield Stadium. Simon Ratcliffe was appointed as manager, but the club was relegated after the 2014–15 season and Ratcliffe subsequently departed.

In June 2020, Gillingham F.C. announced that, as a result of restructuring necessitated by the COVID-19 pandemic, they would no longer operate Gillingham Ladies with immediate effect. The club, sanctioned by the FA Women's National League, simultaneously announced a rebrand as Gillingham Women and would continue competing as an independent entity.

In October 2022 Kevin Hake, the manager-chairman of Chatham Town, was announced as owner-chairman of the side, succeeding Josh Oatham.

The FA approved a name change to Chatham Town Women from the 2023–24 season.
