= 2019–20 FA Women's National League =

FA Women's National League
- Season: 2019–20
- Champions: not awarded
- Promoted: none
- Relegated: none

The 2019–20 FA Women's National League was the 29th season of the competition, and the second since a restructure and rebranding of the top four tiers of English football by The Football Association. Began in 1992, it was previously known as the FA Women's Premier League. It sits at the third and fourth levels of the women's football pyramid, below the FA Women's Championship and above the eight regional football leagues.

The league features six regional divisions: the Northern and Southern divisions at level three of the pyramid, and below those Division One North, Division One Midlands, Division One South East, and Division One South West. The league normally consists of 72 teams, divided equally into six divisions of twelve teams. At the end of the season the champions of the Northern and Southern divisions will both qualify for a Championship play-off match against each other which will decide the overall National League Champion. The divisional alignments for the forthcoming season were outlined at the National League's AGM on 16 June 2019.

On 5 June 2020, the season was curtailed and all results were expunged with no promotion or relegation as a result of the COVID-19 pandemic.

== Premier Division ==
=== Northern Premier Division ===
FA Women's National League Northern Premier Division
- Season: 2019–20
- Champions: N/A
- Promoted: N/A
- Relegated: N/A

Map showing the locations of the teams in the Northern Division of the FA Women's National League

Changes from last season:

- League champions Blackburn Rovers were promoted to the FA Women's Championship.
- Doncaster Rovers Belles were relegated to Division One Midlands.
- Bradford City were relegated to Division One North.
- Loughborough Foxes were realigned to National League North from the National League South.
- Burnley were promoted from Division One North.
- West Bromwich Albion were promoted from Division One Midlands.
- Guiseley Vixens liquidated following the close of the 2018–19 season.

Club	Home ground	Position in 2018–19
AFC Fylde	Mill Farm, Wesham	6th
Burnley	Arbories Memorial Sports Ground, Padiham	Promoted from D1 North (1st)
Derby County	The Don Amott Arena, Derby	3rd
Huddersfield Town	The Stafflex Arena, Kirkburton	4th
Hull City	Hull University Sports Ground, Hull	10th
Loughborough Foxes	Loughborough University Stadium, Loughborough	Realigned from NL South (7th)
Middlesbrough	Bedford Terrace, Billingham	5th
Nottingham Forest	Stokeld Stadium, Carlton	9th
Sheffield	Coach and Horses, Dronfield	11th
Stoke City	Community Drive, Stoke-on-Trent	7th
Sunderland	Eppleton Colliery Welfare Ground, Hetton-le-Hole	2nd
West Bromwich Albion	Trevor Brown Memorial Ground, Sutton Coldfield	Promoted from D1 Midlands (1st)

==== League table ====
Pos	Team	Pld	W	D	L	GF	GA	GD	Pts
1	Sunderland	14	13	1	0	53	10	+43	40
2	Derby County	15	9	2	4	46	17	+29	29
3	Nottingham Forest	13	9	1	3	27	19	+8	28
4	Stoke City	14	8	1	5	32	17	+15	25
5	Burnley	11	7	1	3	19	13	+6	22
6	Huddersfield Town	12	5	3	4	35	22	+13	18
7	West Bromwich Albion	11	5	2	4	31	20	+11	17
8	Middlesbrough	15	4	2	9	27	52	−25	14
9	AFC Fylde	14	3	4	7	15	24	−9	13
10	Loughborough Foxes	15	4	1	10	24	42	−18	13
11	Hull City	14	2	0	12	23	64	−41	6
12	Sheffield	10	1	0	9	7	39	−32	3

Source: The Football Association
Rules for classification: 1) Points; 2) Goal difference; 3) Number of goals scored

==== Results ====
Home \ Away	BUR	DER	FYL	HUD	HUL	LOU	MID	NOT	SHE	STO	SUN	WBA
Burnley	—	3–2	0–0			2–0		0–1	3–0			
Derby County	1–0	—	0–1		6–1	5–0	7–0	0–1		2–1		
AFC Fylde		1–1	—		1–2	2–1	3–3				1–2	
Huddersfield Town	2–3	5–2	2–2	—	6–2			1–1		2–1	1–4	
Hull City		1–6			—	3–7	3–6		1–2		0–4	2–1
Loughborough Foxes	0–2	0–2		0–6	3–2	—	6–1	0–3	3–2	0–1		3–3
Middlesbrough	2–3	1–3	1–0	0–6			—	5–2		1–3	1–1	
Nottingham Forest			2–1	2–1	5–2		1–0	—	5–0	2–6	1–3	
Sheffield		0–7	2–3				0–5		—		1–6	
Stoke City	3–0		3–0	1–1	4–1				3–0	—	0–2	0–2
Sunderland			4–0		9–1	3–1	6–1		3–0		—	
West Bromwich Albion	2–3	2–2			4–2	5–0	8–0				0–2	—

Updated to match(es) played on 8 March 2020. Source: FA Full-Time
Legend: Blue = home team win; Yellow = draw; Red = away team win.

=== Southern Premier Division ===
FA Women's National League Southern Premier Division
- Season: 2019–20
- Champions: N/A
- Promoted: N/A
- Relegated: N/A

Map showing the locations of the teams in the Southern Division of the FA Women's National League

Changes from last season:

- League champions Coventry United were promoted to the FA Women's Championship.
- C & K Basildon were relegated to Division One South East.
- Loughborough Foxes were realigned to the National League North from the National League South.
- Crawley Wasps were promoted from Division One South East.
- Keynsham Town were promoted from Division One South West.
- Yeovil Town were relegated from the FA WSL after they were denied an FA Women's Championship license.
- Queens Park Rangers were renamed Hounslow after losing its affiliation to Queens Park Rangers F.C.

Club	Home ground	Position 2018–19
Cardiff City	CCB Centre for Sporting Excellence, Ystrad Mynach	2nd
Chichester City	Oaklands Park, Chichester	3rd
Crawley Wasps	Tinsley Lane, Crawley	Promoted from D1 South East (1st)
Gillingham	Maidstone Road Sports Ground, Chatham	10th
Hounslow	Green Lane, Hounslow	11th (as QPR)
Keynsham Town	The AJN Stadium, Keynsham	Promoted from D1 South West (1st)
MK Dons	Stadium MK, Milton Keynes	9th
Oxford United	Marsh Lane, Marston	4th
Plymouth Argyle	Haye Road, Plymouth	6th
Portsmouth	Kendall's Stadium, Portsmouth	8th
Watford	CRY Community Stadium, Kings Langley	5th
Yeovil Town	The Avenue Stadium, Dorchester	Relegated from WSL (11th)

==== League table ====
Pos	Team	Pld	W	D	L	GF	GA	GD	Pts
1	Crawley Wasps	14	12	1	1	36	9	+27	37
2	Watford	11	9	1	1	40	14	+26	28
3	Oxford United	14	9	0	5	44	20	+24	27
4	Plymouth Argyle	14	9	0	5	42	18	+24	27
5	Yeovil Town	13	8	2	3	47	17	+30	26
6	Cardiff City Ladies	13	8	1	4	23	9	+14	25
7	Portsmouth	9	5	0	4	28	15	+13	15
8	Milton Keynes Dons	14	4	1	9	18	30	−12	13
9	Gillingham	11	3	2	6	12	27	−15	11
10	Keynsham Town	12	2	1	9	9	39	−30	7
11	Hounslow	14	0	3	11	4	74	−70	3
12	Chichester City	13	0	2	11	6	37	−31	2

Source: The Football Association
Rules for classification: 1) Points; 2) Goal difference; 3) Number of goals scored

==== Results ====
Home \ Away	CAR	CHI	CRA	GIL	HOU	KEY	MKD	OXF	PLY	POR	WAT	YEO
Cardiff City	—			0–1	6–1	1–0	1–0	1–0	1–2	1–2		
Chichester City	0–2	—	1–7		0–0		0–3		0–5	1–4	2–3	
Crawley Wasps	2–0	1–0	—	2–2	4–0			3–1	2–0	3–1	1–3	
Gillingham	0–5	1–1		—			4–2		0–2		0–4	1–2
Hounslow			0–5		—	1–1	0–4		0–8		0–6	0–9
Keynsham Town	0–2	2–1	0–1			—	1–2	1–6		2–7		0–5
Milton Keynes Dons		2–0	0–2		1–1		—	0–5	1–5	0–4		
Oxford United		4–0		1–2	11–0	0–1	2–1	—	2–1	2–1		4–3
Plymouth Argyle			0–1	2–0	2–1	6–1			—		4–5	5–1
Portsmouth					8–0			1–4		—	0–2	
Watford	0–2					7–0	3–1	5–2			—	2–2
Yeovil Town	1–1	3–0	1–2	6–1	9–0		2–1		3–0			—

Updated to match(es) played on 8 March 2020. Source: FA Full-Time
Legend: Blue = home team win; Yellow = draw; Red = away team win.

== Division One ==
=== Division One North ===
FA Women's National League Division One North
- Season: 2019–20
- Champions: N/A
- Promoted: N/A
- Relegated: N/A

Map showing the locations of the teams in the Division One North of the FA Women's National League

Changes from last season:

- League champions Burnley were promoted to the National League North.
- Bradford City were relegated from the National League North.
- Durham Cestria were promoted from the North East Regional Women's Football League Premier Division.
- Stockport County were promoted from the North West Women's Regional Football League Premier Division.
- Morecambe and Crewe Alexandra were relegated.

Club	Home ground	Position in 2018–19
Barnsley	Barnsley FC Academy, Barnsley	4th
Bolton Wanderers	Kensite Stadium, Atherton	8th
Bradford City	Plumpton Park, Bradford	Relegated from NL North (13th)
Brighouse Town	The Yorkshire Payments Stadium, Brighouse	2nd
Chester-le-Street	Moor Park, Chester Moor	3rd
Chorley	Victory Park Stadium, Chorley	7th
Durham Cestria	The Graham Sports Centre, Durham	Promoted from NERWFL Premier Division (1st)
Leeds United	Thorp Arch, Wetherby	6th
Liverpool Feds	I.M. Marsh Campus, Liverpool	5th
Newcastle United	Druid Park, Newcastle upon Tyne	9th
Norton & Stockton Ancients	Norton Teesside Sports Complex, Stockton-on-Tees	10th
Stockport County	Stockport Sports Village, Stockport	Promoted from NWWRFL Premier Division (1st)

==== League table ====
Pos	Team	Pld	W	D	L	GF	GA	GD	Pts
1	Barnsley	14	12	2	0	39	14	+25	38
2	Leeds United	16	11	2	3	35	16	+19	35
3	Brighouse Town	12	8	4	0	25	10	+15	28
4	Liverpool Feds	15	8	2	5	29	16	+13	26
5	Durham Cestria	13	6	4	3	33	15	+18	22
6	Newcastle United	15	6	2	7	19	23	−4	20
7	Chester-le-Street	13	4	3	6	24	29	−5	15
8	Norton & Stockton Ancients	12	3	4	5	24	30	−6	13
9	Bolton Wanderers	14	3	2	9	16	31	−15	11
10	Stockport County (Note: Stockport County deducted one point)	15	3	2	10	25	41	−16	10
11	Chorley	13	2	2	9	10	18	−8	8
12	Bradford City	14	2	1	11	9	45	−36	7

Source: The Football Association
Rules for classification: 1) Points; 2) Goal difference; 3) Number of goals scored

=== Division One Midlands ===
FA Women's National League Division One Midlands
- Season: 2019–20
- Champions: N/A
- Promoted: N/A
- Relegated: N/A

Map showing the locations of the teams in Division One Midlands of the FA Women's National League

Changes from last season:

- League champions West Bromwich Albion were promoted to the National League North.
- Doncaster Rovers Belles were relegated from the National League North.
- Leafield Athletic were promoted from the West Midlands Regional Women's Football League Premier Division.
- Leicester United were promoted from the East Midlands Regional Women's Football League Premier Division.
- Steel City Wanderers were relegated.
- Nettleham changed their name to Lincoln City

Club	Home ground	Position 2018–19
Bedworth United	The Oval, Bedworth	5th
Birmingham & West Midlands	Trevor Brown Memorial Ground, Sutton Coldfield	3rd
Burton Albion	The Lamb Ground, Tamworth	9th
Doncaster Rovers Belles	Oxford Street, Rossington	Relegated from NL North (12th)
Leafield Athletic	Stockingford Pavilion, Nuneaton	Promoted from WMRWFL Premier Division (1st)
Leicester United	Riverside Pavilion, Leicester	Promoted from EMRWFL Premier Division (1st)
Lincoln City	Ashby Avenue, Lincoln	7th (as Nettleham)
Long Eaton United	Grange Park, Long Eaton	6th
Solihull Moors	West Midland Sports & Social Club, Birmingham	10th
Sporting Khalsa	The Aspray Arena, Willenhall	4th
The New Saints (TNS)	Park Hall Stadium, Oswestry	8th
Wolverhampton Wanderers	CKW Stadium, Castlecroft, Wolverhampton	2nd

==== League table ====
Pos	Team	Pld	W	D	L	GF	GA	GD	Pts
1	Wolverhampton Wanderers	15	14	0	1	83	10	+73	42
2	Birmingham & West Midlands	15	9	3	3	50	23	+27	30
3	Bedworth United	16	9	3	4	50	34	+16	30
4	The New Saints	15	8	3	4	42	31	+11	27
5	Lincoln City	14	8	0	6	44	25	+19	24
6	Long Eaton United	15	7	1	7	25	23	+2	22
7	Leicester United	13	6	1	6	28	41	−13	19
8	Sporting Khalsa	14	5	1	8	28	32	−4	16
9	Leafield Athletic	14	5	1	8	30	35	−5	16
10	Doncaster Rovers Belles	15	5	1	9	24	37	−13	16
11	Solihull Moors	14	3	0	11	18	53	−35	9
12	Burton Albion	12	0	0	12	10	88	−78	0

Source: The Football Association
Rules for classification: 1) Points; 2) Goal difference; 3) Number of goals scored

=== Division One South East ===
FA Women's National League Division One South East
- Season: 2019–20
- Champions: N/A
- Promoted: N/A
- Relegated: N/A

Map showing the locations of the teams in Division One South East of the FA Women's National League

Changes from last season:

- League champions Crawley Wasps were promoted to the National League South.
- AFC Basildon were relegated from the National League South.
- Cambridge City were promoted from Eastern Region Women's Football League.
- Kent Football United were promoted from London and South East Women's Regional Football League.
- Denham United and Luton Town were relegated.

Club	Home ground	Position 2018–19
Actonians	Rectory Park, Northolt	4th
AFC Basildon	The Frost Hire Stadium, Canvey Island	Relegated from NL South (12th as C & K Basildon)
AFC Wimbledon	War Memorial Sports Ground, Sutton	6th
Billericay Town	AGP Arena, Billericay	2nd
Cambridge City	The Ellgia Stadium, Ely	Promoted from ERWFL (1st)
Cambridge United	Recreation Way, Mildenhall	8th
Enfield Town	Queen Elizabeth II Stadium, Enfield	3rd
Ipswich Town	The Goldstar Ground, Felixstowe	7th
Kent Football United	Glentworth Sports Club, Kent	Promoted from LSEWRFL (1st)
Leyton Orient	Mile End Stadium, Bow, London	5th
Norwich City	Plantation Park, Blofield	10th
Stevenage	Hertingfordbury Park, Hertford	9th

==== League table ====
Pos	Team	Pld	W	D	L	GF	GA	GD	Pts
1	Ipswich Town	14	11	1	2	53	11	+42	34
2	AFC Wimbledon	14	10	3	1	30	12	+18	33
3	AFC Basildon	14	9	2	3	44	31	+13	29
4	Billericay Town	12	9	1	2	39	12	+27	28
5	Leyton Orient	12	8	1	3	27	14	+13	25
6	Enfield Town	13	7	3	3	32	17	+15	24
7	Actonians	12	5	1	6	20	25	−5	16
8	Cambridge United	15	4	2	9	16	31	−15	14
9	Norwich City	16	3	2	11	34	69	−35	11
10	Stevenage	15	3	1	11	32	56	−24	10
11	Cambridge City	13	2	3	8	16	33	−17	9
12	Kent Football United	14	1	0	13	18	50	−32	3

Source: The Football Association
Rules for classification: 1) Points; 2) Goal difference; 3) Number of goals scored

=== Division One South West ===
FA Women's National League Division One South West
- Season: 2019–20
- Champions: N/A
- Promoted: N/A
- Relegated: N/A

Map showing the locations of the teams in Division One South West of the FA Women's National League

Changes from last season:

- League champions Keynsham Town were promoted to the National League South.
- Exeter City were promoted from the South West Regional Women's Football League.
- Southampton were promoted from the Southern Region Women's Football League.
- St Nicholas withdrew from the league at the start of the 2018–19 season.
- Southampton Saints disbanded prior to the start of the 2019–20 season.

Club	Home ground	Position 2018–19
Brislington	Brislington Stadium, Brislington	7th
Buckland Athletic	Homers Heath, Newton Abbot	3rd
Cheltenham Town	Petersfield Park, Cheltenham	4th
Chesham United	The Meadow, Chesham	5th
Exeter City	Clifford Hill Training Ground,	Promoted from SWRWFL Premier Division (1st)
Larkhall Athletic	Plain Ham, Larkhall	6th
Maidenhead United	York Road Stadium, Maidenhead	10th
Poole Town	Dorset County F.A. County Ground, Poole	11th
Southampton	Testwood Stadium, Totton	Promoted from SRWFL Premier Division (1st)
Southampton Women	Gang Warily Recreation Ground, Southampton	2nd
Swindon Town	Cinder Lane, Fairford	9th

==== League table ====
Pos	Team	Pld	W	D	L	GF	GA	GD	Pts
1	Southampton	11	10	1	0	53	5	+48	31
2	Southampton Women	12	9	2	1	39	13	+26	29
3	Exeter City	12	8	1	3	38	27	+11	25
4	Cheltenham Town (Note: Cheltenham fined and deducted three points for fielding an ineligible player.)	11	9	1	1	19	10	+9	25
5	Chesham United	11	5	2	4	34	29	+5	17
6	Larkhall Athletic	8	5	1	2	19	15	+4	16
7	Buckland Athletic	11	3	2	6	20	21	−1	11
8	Brislington	11	2	2	7	22	35	−13	8
9	Maidenhead United	12	2	0	10	8	42	−34	6
10	Poole Town	11	1	0	10	11	37	−26	3
11	Swindon Town	12	1	0	11	15	44	−29	3

Source: The Football Association
Rules for classification: 1) Points; 2) Goal difference; 3) Number of goals scored
