= 2017–18 FA Women's Premier League =

FA Women's Premier League
- Season: 2017–18
- Dates: 20 August 2017 – 27 May 2018
- Champions: Charlton Athletic
- Promoted: Charlton Athletic; Leicester City; Lewes; Sheffield United; West Ham United

The 2017–18 FA Women's Premier League is the 27th season of the competition, which began in 1992. It sits at the third and fourth levels of the women's football pyramid, below the two divisions of the FA Women's Super League and above the eight regional football leagues.

The league features six regional divisions: the Northern and Southern divisions at level three of the pyramid, and below those Northern Division 1, Midlands Division 1, South East Division 1, and South West Division 1. 71 teams were members of the league before the start of the 2017–18 season, divided equally into five divisions of twelve teams, and one division of eleven teams. At the end of the season Blackburn Rovers and Charlton Athletic, respectively the champions of the Northern and Southern divisions, qualified for a championship play-off match against each other which Charlton Athletic won 2–1, thus becoming the overall National League Champion, and winning them promotion to the re-branded FA Women's Championship. As part of the restructuring of the top 4 tiers of women football by The Football Association, West Ham United was awarded promotion to the FA WSL, with Leicester City, Lewes, and Sheffield United awarded promotion to the FA Women's Championship.

== Premier Division ==
=== Northern Premier Division ===
FA Women's Premier League Northern Premier Division
- Season: 2017–18
- Champions: Blackburn Rovers
- Promoted: Leicester City
- Relegated: Wolverhampton Wanderers; West Bromwich Albion

Map showing the locations of the teams in the Northern Division of the FA Women's Premier League

Changes from last season:

- Newcastle United was relegated to Northern Division One.
- Wolverhampton Wanderers and Guiseley Vixens were promoted into the Northern Division from Midlands Division One and Northern Division One respectively.

Team	Home ground	2016–17 position
Blackburn Rovers	Sir Tom Finney Stadium, Bamber Bridge	1st
Bradford City	Plumpton Park, Bradford	8th
Derby County	The Don Amott Arena, Derby	5th
Fylde Ladies	Mill Farm, Wesham	7th
Guiseley Vixens	Nethermoor Park, Guiseley	1st in Northern Division One (promoted)
Huddersfield Town	The Stafflex Arena, Kirkburton	9th
Leicester City	Farley Way Stadium, Quorn	3rd
Middlesbrough	Teesdale Park, Thornaby-on-Tees	2nd
Nottingham Forest	Mill Street Playing Fields, Nottingham	10th
Stoke City	Community Drive, Stoke-on-Trent	4th
West Bromwich Albion	Trevor Brown Memorial Ground, Sutton Coldfield	6th
Wolverhampton Wanderers	Keys Park, Hednesford	1st in Midlands Division One (promoted)

==== League table ====
Pos	Team	Pld	W	D	L	GF	GA	GD	Pts	Promotion or relegation
1	Blackburn Rovers (C)	22	18	2	2	68	17	+51	56	Qualification for the Championship play-off
2	Leicester City (P)	22	14	4	4	68	32	+36	46	Awarded a FA Women's Championship licence through application
3	Middlesbrough	22	14	0	8	63	52	+11	42	
4	Stoke City	22	12	4	6	52	38	+14	40	
5	Fylde Ladies	22	10	6	6	35	35	0	36	
6	Huddersfield Town	22	10	5	7	45	27	+18	35	
7	Derby County	22	7	5	10	27	37	−10	26	
8	Bradford City	22	7	4	11	40	45	−5	25	
9	Nottingham Forest	22	5	4	13	23	57	−34	19	
10	Guiseley Vixens	22	4	5	13	33	56	−23	17	
11	Wolverhampton Wanderers (R)	22	4	5	13	30	56	−26	17	Relegation to the Division One Midlands
12	West Bromwich Albion (R)	22	4	2	16	27	59	−32	14	Relegation to the Division One Midlands

Source: FA Full-Time
Rules for classification: 1) Points; 2) Goal difference; 3) Number of goals scored
(C) Champions; (P) Promoted; (R) Relegated

==== Results ====
Home \ Away	BLB	BRA	DER	FYL	GUI	HUD	LCW	MID	NOT	STK	WBA	WOL
Blackburn Rovers	—	7–0	6–2	3–0	3–1	0–2	1–2	4–0	7–0	3–0	2–0	3–0
Bradford City	0–3	—	1–2	1–2	3–0	1–1	1–4	9–2	0–0	2–6	4–2	4–1
Derby County	0–1	0–1	—	1–0	2–2	0–1	1–1	0–3	3–2	0–4	1–1	1–1
Fylde Ladies	1–6	2–1	1–1	—	2–0	2–2	2–7	4–3	1–0	0–0	2–1	0–0
Guiseley Vixens	1–3	2–2	0–2	2–2	—	2–1	0–4	1–5	6–0	3–3	3–2	2–2
Huddersfield Town	1–2	2–2	0–3	1–0	6–0	—	1–1	0–1	4–0	2–0	4–0	2–0
Leicester City	2–3	2–0	4–0	0–0	2–3	3–2	—	1–2	2–2	3–4	3–2	6–0
Middlesbrough	2–3	3–2	3–1	0–3	3–1	0–3	3–6	—	4–1	3–0	4–0	7–1
Nottingham Forest	1–4	1–0	1–0	3–4	1–0	2–2	0–4	1–5	—	0–1	5–1	0–5
Stoke City	1–1	1–2	1–4	3–1	3–2	3–2	1–3	6–3	3–1	—	2–1	1–1
West Bromwich Albion	0–2	2–1	1–2	0–5	3–1	2–1	1–4	2–3	1–1	0–5	—	1–2
Wolverhampton Wanderers	1–1	0–3	2–1	0–1	2–1	3–5	3–4	3–4	0–1	1–4	2–4	—

Source: FA Full-Time
Legend: Blue = home team win; Yellow = draw; Red = away team win.

=== Southern Premier Division ===
FA Women's Premier League Southern Premier Division
- Season: 2017–18
- Champions: Charlton Athletic
- Promoted: Charlton Athletic; Crystal Palace; Lewes; West Ham United
- Relegated: Swindon Town

Map showing the locations of the teams in the Southern Division of the FA Women's Premier League

Changes from last season:

- League champions Tottenham Hotspur was promoted to FA WSL 2.
- Chichester City and Gillingham were promoted from South West and South East Division One.

Team	Home ground	2016–17 position
C & K Basildon	The Frost Financial Stadium, Canvey Island	6th
Cardiff City	CCB Centre for Sporting Excellence, Ystrad Mynach	3rd
Charlton Athletic	Bayliss Avenue, Thamesmead, London	4th
Chichester City	Oaklands Park, Chichester	1st in South West Division One (promoted)
Coventry United	Butts Park Arena, Coventry	2nd
Crystal Palace	Hayes Lane, Kent	5th
Gillingham	K Sports Cobdown, Aylesford	1st in South East Division One (promoted)
Lewes	The Dripping Pan, Lewes	7th
Portsmouth	Privett Park, Gosport	8th
Queens Park Rangers	Honeycroft, West Drayton, London	11th
Swindon Town	Cinder Lane, Fairford	10th
West Ham United	Ship Lane, Aveley	9th

==== League table ====
Pos	Team	Pld	W	D	L	GF	GA	GD	Pts	Promotion or relegation
1	Charlton Athletic (C, O, P)	22	20	0	2	98	13	+85	60	Qualification for the Championship play-off
2	C & K Basildon	22	17	1	4	51	24	+27	52	
3	Crystal Palace (P)	22	16	2	4	59	15	+44	50	Awarded a FA Women's Championship licence through application
4	Coventry United	22	14	2	6	69	20	+49	44	
5	Lewes (P)	22	14	2	6	45	25	+20	44	Awarded a FA Women's Championship licence through application
6	Portsmouth	22	12	1	9	44	35	+9	37	
7	West Ham United (P)	22	9	2	11	57	42	+15	29	Awarded a FA WSL licence through application
8	Chichester City	22	8	4	10	43	48	−5	28	
9	Gillingham	22	5	2	15	24	53	−29	17	
10	Cardiff City	22	4	4	14	40	69	−29	16	
11	Queens Park Rangers	22	2	2	18	17	94	−77	8	
12	Swindon Town (R)	22	0	0	22	10	119	−109	0	Relegation to Division One South West

Source: FA Full-Time
Rules for classification: 1) Points; 2) Goal difference; 3) Number of goals scored
(C) Champions; (O) Play-off winners; (P) Promoted; (R) Relegated

==== Results ====
Home \ Away	C&K	CAR	CHA	CHI	CVU	CRY	GIL	LEW	POR	QPR	SWT	WHU
C & K Basildon	—	5–0	2–1	2–0	1–0	1–0	3–0	1–0	4–2	1–0	3–1	3–0
Cardiff City	2–4	—	1–3	2–5	2–2	2–5	3–2	2–3	0–2	1–1	4–1	2–6
Charlton Athletic	4–1	5–1	—	4–1	2–0	1–0	8–1	6–1	1–0	7–0	11–0	1–3
Chichester City	0–1	3–3	0–6	—	0–3	2–4	1–0	1–2	3–2	3–0	2–1	4–0
Coventry United	4–1	4–0	0–3	3–1	—	1–2	5–0	2–1	1–2	4–1	7–0	2–1
Crystal Palace	2–0	2–0	0–4	4–1	0–0	—	2–0	3–0	2–0	9–0	8–1	0–0
Gillingham	1–3	1–1	1–2	0–4	0–9	0–1	—	0–2	0–4	3–0	5–0	1–0
Lewes	1–1	4–0	1–2	2–2	1–0	1–0	2–0	—	1–0	3–0	7–0	3–0
Portsmouth	2–1	4–1	0–1	2–2	0–2	0–4	3–1	3–2	—	6–1	5–0	2–1
Queens Park Rangers	1–3	3–4	0–11	1–1	1–10	1–2	0–4	0–3	0–1	—	2–0	0–10
Swindon Town	0–3	0–6	0–9	4–7	0–8	0–7	0–4	1–3	0–3	1–4	—	0–6
West Ham United	3–7	4–3	0–6	2–0	1–2	0–2	0–0	1–2	7–1	7–1	5–0	—

Source: FA Full-Time
Legend: Blue = home team win; Yellow = draw; Red = away team win.

=== Championship play-off ===
The overall FA WPL champion was decided by a play-off match held at the end of the season. Charlton Athletic earned promotion to the FA WSL 2, after defeating Blackburn Rovers 2–1.

27 May 2018
14:00 BST (UTC+01:00)

Blackburn Rovers (N)	1–2	Charlton Athletic (S)
Shepherd 5'	Report	Graham 42'; Griffin 45'

Bramall Lane, Sheffield
Attendance: 917
Referee: Lucy Oliver

Blackburn Rovers	Charlton Athletic

== Division One ==
=== Division One North ===
FA Women's Premier League Division One North
- Season: 2017–18
- Champions: Hull City
- Promoted: Hull City
- Relegated: Mossley Hill

Map showing the locations of the teams in the Northern Division One of the FA Women's Premier League

Changes from last season:

- Guiseley Vixens was promoted to the Northern Division.
- Newcastle United was relegated from the Northern Division.
- Barnsley was promoted from the North East Regional League.
- Bolton Wanderers was promoted from the North West Regional League.
- Blackpool Wren Rovers and Tranmere Rovers were relegated to the regional leagues.
- Leeds was renamed Leeds United.

Team	Home ground	2016–17 position
Barnsley	Barnsley F.C. Academy, Barnsley	1st in North East Regional League (promoted)
Bolton Wanderers	Kensite Stadium, Atherton	1st in North West Regional League (promoted)
Brighouse Town	The Dual Seal Stadium, Brighouse	6th
Chester-le-Street	Moor Park, Chester Moor	4th
Chorley	Jim Fowler Memorial Fields, Leyland	5th
Crewe Alexandra	Cumberland Arena, Crewe	10th
Hull City	Hull University Sports Ground, Hull	3rd
Leeds United	Genix Healthcare Stadium, Garforth	8th
Liverpool Marshall Feds	I.M. Marsh Campus, Liverpool	2nd
Morecambe	Lancaster & Morecambe College, Lancaster	7th
Mossley Hill	Mossley Hill Athletic Club, Liverpool	9th
Newcastle United	Newcastle United Sport Ground 3G, Newcastle upon Tyne	11th in Northern Division (relegated)

==== League table ====
Pos	Team	Pld	W	D	L	GF	GA	GD	Pts	Promotion or relegation
1	Hull City (C, P)	22	17	3	2	66	14	+52	54	Promotion to the Northern Premier Division
2	Brighouse Town	22	16	2	4	60	30	+30	50	
3	Liverpool Marshall Feds	22	14	4	4	48	18	+30	46	
4	Bolton Wanderers	22	11	1	10	38	38	0	34	
5	Newcastle United	22	9	3	10	44	47	−3	30	
6	Chorley	22	9	2	11	41	41	0	29	
7	Morecambe	22	9	2	11	49	60	−11	29	
8	Crewe Alexandra	22	7	5	10	30	33	−3	26	
9	Chester-le-Street	22	8	1	13	35	49	−14	25	
10	Leeds United	22	7	2	13	26	43	−17	23	
11	Barnsley	22	4	5	13	32	64	−32	17	
12	Mossley Hill (R)	22	5	2	15	28	60	−32	17	Relegation from the Premier League

Source: FA Full-Time
Rules for classification: 1) Points; 2) Goal difference; 3) Number of goals scored
(C) Champions; (P) Promoted; (R) Relegated

==== Results ====
Home \ Away	BAR	BOL	BRI	CLS	CHO	CRE	HUL	LEE	LMF	MOR	MOH	NEW
Barnsley	—	1–3	0–3	3–1	0–0	1–1	0–5	1–2	2–3	1–4	2–2	1–1
Bolton Wanderers	2–2	—	2–3	2–1	5–2	1–0	0–1	3–1	1–0	1–4	3–1	1–2
Brighouse Town	3–1	4–3	—	4–2	2–1	3–1	0–1	3–1	1–3	1–2	5–1	4–0
Chester-le-Street	2–5	1–0	2–6	—	2–1	1–2	0–1	3–0	0–1	2–1	3–1	3–2
Chorley	5–1	2–1	0–3	2–1	—	4–1	2–4	0–1	1–1	0–1	6–1	3–1
Crewe Alexandra	3–1	0–1	0–1	6–2	2–4	—	2–1	0–0	0–1	2–2	2–0	0–2
Hull City	6–1	2–0	2–0	2–1	4–1	1–1	—	5–1	3–0	7–0	4–0	4–1
Leeds United	3–4	0–1	2–5	1–0	1–2	1–1	0–1	—	0–2	1–3	2–1	1–0
Liverpool Marshall Feds	8–0	1–2	0–0	4–0	1–0	2–1	2–2	2–1	—	5–0	4–0	3–0
Morecambe	1–3	6–2	2–2	2–3	3–1	2–4	0–9	1–2	3–1	—	8–2	2–4
Mossley Hill	3–0	2–1	1–2	0–2	1–2	0–1	1–1	2–1	0–3	5–1	—	3–2
Newcastle United	3–2	2–3	3–5	3–3	4–2	2–0	1–0	3–4	1–1	2–1	5–1	—

Source: FA Full-Time
Legend: Blue = home team win; Yellow = draw; Red = away team win.

=== Division One Midlands ===
FA Women's Premier League Division One Midlands
- Season: 2017–18
- Champions: Loughborough Foxes
- Promoted: Loughborough Foxes; Sheffield United
- Relegated: Rotherham United; Leicester City Ladies

Map showing the locations of the teams in Midlands Division One of the FA Women's Premier League

Changes from last season:

- Wolverhampton Wanderers was promoted to the Northern Division.
- Burton Albion was promoted from the West Midlands Regional League.
- Sheffield United was promoted from the East Midlands Regional League.
- Loughborough Students was relegated to the regional leagues.

Team	Home ground	2016–17 position
Birmingham & West Midlands	The Vale Stadium, Birmingham	5th
Burton Albion	Marston Road, Stafford	1st in West Midlands Regional League (promoted)
Leicester City Ladies	Linwood Playing Fields, Leicester	10th
Long Eaton United	Grange Park, Long Eaton	7th
Loughborough Foxes	Loughborough University Stadium, Loughborough	2nd
Radcliffe Olympic	Wharf Lane Recreation Ground, Radcliffe-on-Trent	4th
Rotherham United	Roundwood Sports Complex, Rotherham	11th
Sheffield United	Steelphalt Sheffield United Academy, Sheffield	1st in East Midlands Regional League (promoted)
Solihull	West Midland Sports & Social Club, Birmingham	9th
Sporting Khalsa	University of Wolverhampton 3G, Walsall	3rd
Steel City Wanderers	Thorncliffe Recreation Ground, Sheffield	8th
The New Saints	Park Hall Stadium, Oswestry	6th

==== League table ====
Pos	Team	Pld	W	D	L	GF	GA	GD	Pts	Promotion or relegation
1	Loughborough Foxes (C, P)	22	21	1	0	91	9	+82	64	Promotion to the Northern Premier Division
2	Burton Albion	22	15	2	5	54	32	+22	47	
3	Sheffield United (P)	22	13	7	2	79	24	+55	46	Awarded a FA Women's Championship licence through application
4	Radcliffe Olympic	22	13	2	7	51	31	+20	41	
5	The New Saints	22	12	3	7	76	45	+31	39	
6	Long Eaton United	22	10	1	11	38	39	−1	31	
7	Solihull	22	9	3	10	55	47	+8	30	
8	Sporting Khalsa	22	8	2	12	40	39	+1	26	
9	Birmingham & West Midlands	22	7	3	12	48	52	−4	24	
10	Steel City Wanderers	22	7	2	13	43	73	−30	23	
11	Rotherham United (R)	22	2	1	19	15	114	−99	7	Relegation from the Premier League
12	Leicester City Ladies (R)	22	1	1	20	11	96	−85	4	Relegation from the Premier League

Source: FA Full-Time
Rules for classification: 1) Points; 2) Goal difference; 3) Number of goals scored
(C) Champions; (P) Promoted; (R) Relegated

==== Results ====
Home \ Away	BWM	BRT	LCL	LEU	LFO	RAD	ROT	SHU	SOL	SPK	SCW	TNS
Birmingham & West Midlands	—	1–3	6–0	1–2	0–5	0–2	12–1	1–5	0–5	0–3	7–0	1–1
Burton Albion	4–1	—	4–0	2–1	0–3	1–2	6–0	1–1	4–1	4–2	2–2	3–2
Leicester City Ladies	1–3	0–1	—	0–3	0–4	0–1	2–3	1–6	1–4	0–6	0–6	0–12
Long Eaton United	0–1	0–1	4–0	—	0–2	0–3	2–0	0–0	3–7	2–0	3–0	2–3
Loughborough Foxes	3–0	2–0	7–0	6–0	—	4–1	5–0	3–0	3–1	6–0	9–0	5–1
Radcliffe Olympic	2–0	1–2	5–1	1–0	2–4	—	5–1	0–0	3–3	2–1	H–W	4–1
Rotherham United	2–5	0–7	1–1	0–6	0–4	1–3	—	0–11	3–1	0–2	1–7	1–3
Sheffield United	5–0	5–1	4–0	4–1	1–1	2–1	10–0	—	2–4	2–2	5–1	4–0
Solihull	2–2	0–2	4–1	1–3	0–1	4–3	9–0	2–5	—	0–0	2–3	0–4
Sporting Khalsa	1–3	1–2	6–0	0–2	1–4	2–1	5–0	1–3	0–2	—	2–0	0–2
Steel City Wanderers	3–2	0–3	1–3	2–4	1–6	0–7	4–0	2–2	3–1	2–0	—	5–6
The New Saints	2–2	7–1	5–0	5–0	1–4	4–2	4–1	2–2	1–2	2–5	8–1	—

Source: FA Full-Time
Legend: Blue = home team win; Yellow = draw; Red = away team win.

=== Division One South East ===
FA Women's National League Division One South East
- Season: 2017–18
- Champions: Milton Keynes Dons
- Promoted: Milton Keynes Dons
- Relegated: Haringey Borough

Map showing the locations of the teams in South East Division One of the FA Women's Premier League

Changes from last season:

- Gillingham was promoted to the Southern Division.
- Haringey Borough was promoted from the Eastern Region League.
- Leyton Orient was promoted from the London & South East Regional League.
- Lowestoft Town was relegated to the regional leagues.

Team	Home ground	2016–17 position
Actonians	Berkeley Fields, Greenford, London	6th
AFC Wimbledon	Borough Sports Ground, Sutton, London	3rd
Cambridge United	Recreation Way, Mildenhall	4th
Denham United	The Den, Denham	8th
Enfield Town	Queen Elizabeth II Stadium, Enfield	7th
Haringey Borough	Coles Park, Tottenham	1st in Eastern Region League (promoted)
Ipswich Town	Dellwood Avenue, Felixstowe	9th
Leyton Orient	Matchroom Stadium, Leyton	1st in London & South East Regional League (promoted)
Luton Town	Stockwood Park Athletics Stadium, Luton	5th
Milton Keynes Dons	Willen Road, Newport Pagnell	2nd
Norwich City	Plantation Park, Blofield	10th
Stevenage	Hertingfordbury Park, Hertford	11th

==== League table ====
Pos	Team	Pld	W	D	L	GF	GA	GD	Pts	Promotion or relegation
1	Milton Keynes Dons (C, P)	22	18	3	1	76	18	+58	57	Promotion to the Southern Premier Division
2	AFC Wimbledon	22	17	1	4	68	25	+43	52	
3	Ipswich Town	22	15	3	4	76	26	+50	48	
4	Leyton Orient	22	12	3	7	59	33	+26	39	
5	Luton Town	22	11	2	9	66	39	+27	35	
6	Stevenage	22	9	4	9	48	37	+11	31	
7	Actonians	22	9	3	10	56	32	+24	30	
8	Cambridge United	22	8	6	8	40	28	+12	30	
9	Denham United	22	5	7	10	38	47	−9	22	
10	Enfield Town	22	5	5	12	31	50	−19	20	
11	Norwich City	22	4	1	17	39	81	−42	13	
12	Haringey Borough (R)	22	0	0	22	15	196	−181	0	Relegation from the Premier League

Source: FA Full-Time
Rules for classification: 1) Points; 2) Goal difference; 3) Number of goals scored
(C) Champions; (P) Promoted; (R) Relegated

==== Results ====
Home \ Away	ACT	WIM	CAM	DEN	ENF	HAY	IPS	LEY	LUT	MKD	NOR	STE
Actonians	—	1–2	0–0	3–0	4–2	13–0	1–2	5–1	2–3	0–2	7–2	1–2
AFC Wimbledon	3–0	—	2–0	1–0	2–1	12–2	1–3	3–0	4–1	4–2	8–2	2–3
Cambridge United	0–2	0–1	—	2–2	1–0	12–2	2–2	0–0	1–0	0–2	2–1	2–1
Denham United	0–0	1–3	1–3	—	4–1	5–0	1–6	0–2	1–5	1–1	3–1	2–1
Enfield Town	1–1	0–1	1–0	1–1	—	6–0	3–2	0–0	1–2	1–3	2–3	1–1
Haringey Borough	0–10	1–9	0–7	2–5	1–3	—	0–10	0–8	0–14	0–13	3–4	2–10
Ipswich Town	1–0	1–1	3–1	4–2	5–2	9–0	—	0–2	2–1	0–1	8–1	1–0
Leyton Orient	3–4	2–1	0–1	2–1	9–0	8–0	2–1	—	0–4	2–6	4–1	2–2
Luton Town	2–0	2–3	3–3	5–4	0–0	5–1	1–2	0–4	—	1–2	8–2	5–2
Milton Keynes Dons	4–0	1–0	1–0	1–1	5–1	16–1	2–2	2–1	2–1	—	6–2	1–0
Norwich City	0–1	1–2	3–2	2–2	2–4	7–0	0–5	2–5	2–3	0–1	—	0–1
Stevenage	2–1	1–3	1–1	1–1	3–0	10–0	2–7	0–2	1–0	0–2	4–1	—

Source: FA Full-Time
Legend: Blue = home team win; Yellow = draw; Red = away team win.

=== Division One South West ===
FA Women's National League Division One South West
- Season: 2017–18
- Champions: Plymouth Argyle
- Promoted: Plymouth Argyle
- Relegated: N/A

Map showing the locations of the teams in South West Division One of the FA Women's Premier League

Changes from last season:

- Chichester City was promoted to the Southern Division.
- Southampton Women was promoted from the Southern Region League.
- Poole Town was promoted from the South West Regional League.
- Exeter City was relegated to the regional leagues.
- Shanklin withdrew from the league during the 2016–17 season.

Team	Home ground	2016–17 position
Basingstoke^{[note]}	Winklebury Football Complex, Basingstoke	9th
Brislington	Ironmould Lane, Brislington	6th
Cheltenham Town	Petersfield Park, Cheltenham	10th
Keynsham Town	AJN Stadium, Keynsham	4th
Larkhall Athletic	Plain Ham, Larkhall	5th
Maidenhead United	York Road, Maidenhead	7th
Plymouth Argyle	Haye Road, Plymouth	2nd
Poole Town	Dorset County F.A. County Ground, Poole	3rd in South West Regional League (promoted)
Southampton Saints	VT Group Sportsground, Sholing	3rd
Southampton Women	Testwood Stadium, Southampton	1st in Southern Region League (promoted)
St Nicholas	Lodge Road, Yate	8th

^{[note]} Basingstoke withdrew from the league in February 2018. All results involving Basingstoke were expunged.

==== League table ====
Pos	Team	Pld	W	D	L	GF	GA	GD	Pts	Promotion or relegation
1	Plymouth Argyle (C, P)	18	16	2	0	100	12	+88	50	Promotion to the Southern Premier Division
2	Southampton Women	18	15	2	1	68	20	+48	47	
3	Keynsham Town	18	13	1	4	82	25	+57	40	
4	Southampton Saints	18	12	2	4	38	20	+18	38	
5	Poole Town	18	6	2	10	32	46	−14	20	
6	Brislington	18	5	3	10	25	51	−26	18	
7	Larkhall Athletic	18	4	2	12	21	50	−29	14	
8	Maidenhead United	18	4	2	12	17	52	−35	14	
9	Cheltenham Town	18	3	1	14	17	58	−41	10	
10	St Nicholas	18	3	1	14	18	84	−66	10	
11	Basingstoke (X)	0	0	0	0	0	0	0	0	Resigned from league. Record expunged.

Source: FA Full-Time
Rules for classification: 1) Points; 2) Goal difference; 3) Number of goals scored
(C) Champions; (P) Promoted; (X) Resigned

==== Results ====
Home \ Away	BRI	CHE	KEY	LAR	MAI	PLY	POO	SOS	SOW	STN
Brislington	—	0–0	1–2	1–1	3–1	0–4	4–3	0–3	1–5	2–3
Cheltenham Town	1–4	—	0–4	1–0	1–2	0–5	0–2	0–1	1–3	3–1
Keynsham Town	4–0	9–0	—	2–0	11–0	1–6	5–1	4–1	4–4	11–0
Larkhall Athletic	1–3	5–4	1–4	—	1–0	0–3	0–1	0–3	0–6	5–0
Maidenhead United	0–0	3–2	1–2	1–0	—	0–4	0–1	1–3	0–10	5–2
Plymouth Argyle	9–1	9–0	5–2	9–1	H–W	—	6–1	6–0	7–1	13–0
Poole Town	2–3	6–1	1–6	1–3	2–2	2–3	—	0–4	0–5	6–0
Southampton Saints	3–1	2–0	3–2	3–0	4–0	1–1	0–0	—	1–3	4–1
Southampton Women	6–0	2–0	1–0	6–1	3–0	2–2	3–1	1–0	—	4–0
St Nicholas	3–1	0–3	0–9	2–2	3–1	0–8	1–2	0–2	2–3	—

Source: FA Full-Time
Legend: Blue = home team win; Yellow = draw; Red = away team win.

== Reserve Division ==
=== Reserve Northern Division ===
Map showing the locations of the teams in the Reserve Northern Division of the FA Women's Premier League

==== League table ====
Pos	Team	Pld	W	D	L	GF	GA	GD	Pts	
1	Blackburn Rovers (C)	16	14	1	1	55	8	+47	43	
2	Middlesbrough	16	10	2	4	56	27	+29	32	
3	Newcastle United	16	10	2	4	36	30	+6	32	
4	Huddersfield Town	16	9	3	4	59	25	+34	30	
5	Bradford City	16	4	5	7	34	38	−4	17	
6	Sheffield United	16	5	2	9	26	61	−35	17	
7	Hull City	16	3	3	10	28	47	−19	12	
8	Leeds United	16	3	2	11	23	50	−27	11	
9	Guiseley Vixens	16	3	2	11	25	56	−31	11	
10	Bolton (X)	0	0	0	0	0	0	0	0	Resigned from league. Record expunged.
11	Brighouse Town (X)	0	0	0	0	0	0	0	0	Resigned from league. Record expunged.

Source: FA Full-Time
Rules for classification: 1) Points; 2) Goal difference; 3) Number of goals scored
(C) Champions; (X) Resigned

==== Results ====
Home \ Away	BLB	BRA	GUI	HUD	HUL	LEE	MID	NEW	SHU
Blackburn Rovers	—	3–1	2–0	0–1	10–1	3–0	2–0	1–1	2–0
Bradford City	1–3	—	1–3	2–2	5–2	3–0	2–2	2–5	5–4
Guiseley Vixens	0–3	0–2	—	1–9	2–4	0–5	4–1	3–4	4–3
Huddersfield Town	0–2	2–2	10–1	—	7–2	3–0	3–4	5–1	0–2
Hull City	A–W	3–3	3–3	1–3	—	7–1	2–4	0–3	1–1
Leeds United	0–8	2–2	2–1	A–W	2–0	—	0–4	2–3	3–3
Middlesbrough	1–3	3–1	4–1	4–4	3–0	6–3	—	4–0	9–0
Newcastle United	1–4	1–0	1–1	2–0	H–W	4–1	0–6	—	7–0
Sheffield United	1–9	3–2	2–1	1–10	0–2	3–2	2–1	1–3	—

Source: FA Full-Time
Legend: Blue = home team win; Yellow = draw; Red = away team win.

=== Reserve Midland Division ===
Map showing the locations of the teams in Reserve Midland Division of the FA Women's Premier League

==== League table ====
Pos	Team	Pld	W	D	L	GF	GA	GD	Pts	
1	Stoke City (C)	20	18	1	1	120	15	+105	55	
2	West Bromwich Albion	20	15	2	3	77	29	+48	47	
3	Coventry United	20	14	1	5	73	29	+44	43	
4	Leicester City	20	14	0	6	75	25	+50	42	
5	Loughborough Foxes	20	13	3	4	67	29	+38	42	
6	Derby County	20	12	1	7	86	28	+58	37	
7	Sporting Khalsa	20	7	1	12	52	61	−9	22	
8	Nottingham Forest	20	4	1	15	33	85	−52	13	
9	Long Eaton United	20	4	0	16	28	96	−68	12	
10	The New Saints	20	4	0	16	22	98	−76	12	
11	Burton Albion	20	0	0	20	11	149	−138	0	
12	Cardiff City (X)	0	0	0	0	0	0	0	0	Resigned from league. Record expunged.

Source: FA Full-Time
Rules for classification: 1) Points; 2) Goal difference; 3) Number of goals scored
(C) Champions; (X) Resigned

==== Results ====
Home \ Away	BRT	CVU	DER	LCW	LEU	LFO	NOT	SPK	STK	TNS	WBA
Burton Albion	—	A–W	1–10	0–13	0–4	0–10	3–10	2–3	0–11	1–2	0–9
Coventry United	10–1	—	1–3	1–0	10–0	2–2	8–0	5–1	1–3	6–1	0–2
Derby County	13–1	0–2	—	3–4	7–0	1–2	4–0	4–0	3–5	7–0	2–3
Leicester City	5–0	2–3	4–0	—	7–0	1–0	7–1	3–1	1–2	7–1	1–2
Long Eaton United	3–1	1–2	0–3	2–5	—	1–5	1–3	0–5	0–6	0–3	1–3
Loughborough Foxes	6–0	5–3	0–2	1–0	3–1	—	6–2	5–1	2–5	4–1	1–1
Nottingham Forest	1–0	0–4	0–6	3–4	1–2	2–4	—	2–2	0–13	0–3	1–5
Sporting Khalsa	13–0	1–5	1–9	1–4	6–0	1–3	3–1	—	0–4	8–0	1–4
Stoke City	14–0	3–1	0–0	3–1	14–0	4–0	7–0	4–2	—	6–1	6–0
The New Saints	3–1	2–4	0–6	1–5	3–9	0–7	0–4	0–2	1–9	—	0–7
West Bromwich Albion	9–0	2–5	4–3	0–1	9–3	1–1	3–2	6–0	2–1	5–0	—

Source: FA Full-Time
Legend: Blue = home team win; Yellow = draw; Red = away team win.

=== Reserve Southern Division ===
Map showing the locations of the teams in Reserve Southern Division of the FA Women's Premier League

==== League table ====
Pos	Team	Pld	W	D	L	GF	GA	GD	Pts	
1	C & K Basildon (C)	18	12	3	3	68	24	+44	39	
2	Portsmouth	18	12	2	4	62	24	+38	38	
3	Charlton Athletic	18	12	1	5	65	30	+35	37	
4	AFC Wimbledon	18	9	5	4	45	45	0	32	
5	Crystal Palace	18	9	3	6	42	29	+13	30	
6	Lewes	18	7	5	6	29	26	+3	26	
7	West Ham United	18	6	3	9	70	60	+10	21	
8	Milton Keynes Dons	18	5	2	11	31	54	−23	17	
9	Denham United	18	3	0	15	23	83	−60	9	
10	Queens Park Rangers	18	2	2	14	17	77	−60	8	
11	Southampton Saints (X)	0	0	0	0	0	0	0	0	Resigned from league. Record expunged.

Source: FA Full-Time
Rules for classification: 1) Points; 2) Goal difference; 3) Number of goals scored
(C) Champions; (X) Resigned

==== Results ====
Home \ Away	WIM	C&K	CHA	CRY	DEN	LEW	MKD	POR	QPR	WHU
AFC Wimbledon	—	2–1	0–1	1–1	2–1	2–1	3–2	1–4	6–1	2–1
C & K Basildon	1–1	—	5–2	1–2	5–4	1–1	8–0	1–3	3–1	5–1
Charlton Athletic	10–1	2–2	—	3–0	6–0	2–0	2–4	5–2	7–0	6–1
Crystal Palace	3–1	2–4	1–4	—	6–2	2–1	1–1	0–2	2–3	4–0
Denham United	2–4	0–6	1–5	1–3	—	0–2	3–1	1–5	0–1	2–4
Lewes	2–2	0–5	2–1	0–0	3–0	—	1–2	3–0	1–1	3–2
Milton Keynes Dons	3–5	1–5	2–3	2–0	1–2	1–3	—	0–4	3–3	4–2
Portsmouth	1–1	1–5	5–1	1–2	9–1	3–1	2–1	—	H–W	1–1
Queens Park Rangers	2–3	0–6	0–2	1–8	0–3	0–3	1–2	0–12	—	0–11
West Ham United	8–8	1–4	4–3	1–5	20–0	2–2	6–1	0–7	5–3	—

Source: FA Full-Time
Legend: Blue = home team win; Yellow = draw; Red = away team win.
