= 2018–19 FA Women's National League =

FA Women's National League
- Season: 2018–19
- Dates: 19 August 2018 – 26 May 2019
- Champions: Blackburn Rovers
- Promoted: Blackburn Rovers; Coventry United

The 2018–19 FA Women's National League is the 28th season of the competition, and the first since a restructure and rebranding of the top four tiers of English football by The Football Association. Began in 1992, it was previously known as the FA Women's Premier League. It sits at the third and fourth levels of the women's football pyramid, below the FA Women's Championship and above the eight regional football leagues.

The league features six regional divisions: the Northern and Southern divisions at level three of the pyramid, and below those Division One North, Division One Midlands, Division One South East, and Division One South West. The league normally consists of 72 teams, divided equally into six divisions of twelve teams. After two resignations from and one late promotion to the FA Women's Championship, and one withdrawal from Division One, the league started the 2018–19 season with 13 teams in the Northern Division but only 11 in Division One Midlands. At the end of the season the champions of the Northern and Southern divisions will both qualify for a Championship Play Off match against each other which will decide the overall National League Champion. Subject to meeting league requirements both teams will be promoted to the FA Women's Championship. As part of the Football Association's restructure, clubs from the FA Women's Super League and FA Women's Championship were able to enter teams into the Reserve Section.

== Premier Division ==
=== Northern Premier Division ===
FA Women's National League Northern Premier Division
- Season: 2018–19
- Champions: Blackburn Rovers
- Promoted: Blackburn Rovers
- Relegated: Doncaster Rovers Belles; Bradford City

Map showing the locations of the teams in the Northern Division of the FA Women's National League

Changes from last season:

- Leicester City Women was awarded a FA Women's Championship licence through application.
- Sunderland was demoted from the FA WSL 1 after failing to retain a licence in the top 2 tiers.
- Doncaster Rovers Belles and Sheffield withdrew from the FA Women's Championship before the season started after initially successfully retaining a Tier 2 licence.
- West Bromwich Albion and Wolverhampton Wanderers were relegated to Division One Midlands.
- Hull City were promoted into the Northern Division from Northern Division One.

Team	Home ground	2017–18 position
Blackburn Rovers	Sir Tom Finney Stadium, Bamber Bridge	1st
Bradford City	Plumpton Park, Bradford	8th
Derby County	The Don Amott Arena, Derby	7th
Doncaster Rovers Belles	Oxford Street, Doncaster	1st in WSL 2 (relegated)
Fylde	Mill Farm, Wesham	5th
Guiseley Vixens	Nethermoor Park, Guiseley	10th
Huddersfield Town	The Stafflex Arena, Kirkburton	6th
Hull City	Hull University Sports Ground, Hull	1st in Northern Division One (promoted)
Middlesbrough	Bedford Terrace, Billingham	3rd
Nottingham Forest	Stokeld Stadium, Carlton	9th
Sheffield	Coach and Horses, Dronfield	5th in WSL 2 (relegated)
Stoke City	Community Drive, Stoke-on-Trent	4th
Sunderland	Eppleton Colliery Welfare Ground, Hetton-le-Hole	7th in WSL 1 (relegated)

==== League table ====
Pos	Team	Pld	W	D	L	GF	GA	GD	Pts	Promotion or relegation
1	Blackburn Rovers (C, O, P)	24	23	0	1	115	18	+97	69	Promotion to the Championship, qualification for the Championship play-off
2	Sunderland	24	15	3	6	83	36	+47	48	
3	Derby County	24	15	3	6	54	35	+19	48	
4	Huddersfield Town	24	15	2	7	79	40	+39	47	
5	Middlesbrough	24	13	4	7	60	41	+19	43	
6	Fylde	24	13	3	8	48	33	+15	42	
7	Stoke City	24	9	6	9	59	51	+8	33	
8	Guiseley Vixens	24	9	4	11	45	48	−3	31	
9	Nottingham Forest	24	7	4	13	29	57	−28	25	
10	Hull City	24	7	2	15	41	65	−24	23	
11	Sheffield	24	6	3	15	37	55	−18	21	
12	Doncaster Rovers Belles (R)	24	4	6	14	32	75	−43	18	Relegation to the Division One Midlands
13	Bradford City (R)	24	0	0	24	12	140	−128	0	Relegation to the Division One North

Source: FA Full-Time
Rules for classification: 1) Points; 2) Goal difference; 3) Number of goals scored
(C) Champions; (O) Play-off winners; (P) Promoted; (R) Relegated

==== Results ====
Home \ Away	BLB	BRA	DER	DON	FYL	GUI	HUD	HUL	MID	NOT	SHE	STK	SUN
Blackburn Rovers	—	10–0	3–0	9–2	3–0	5–1	4–0	2–0	5–0	7–0	4–2	6–1	2–1
Bradford City	1–9	—	0–10	0–1	0–5	1–7	0–8	1–3	0–4	0–2	0–5	0–5	1–2
Derby County	0–7	2–1	—	4–2	0–1	2–1	2–1	7–2	2–0	1–0	1–0	2–1	1–0
Doncaster Rovers Belles	0–9	5–1	0–3	—	2–3	1–1	2–2	0–2	0–2	1–3	2–0	1–2	2–2
Fylde	0–1	9–0	3–1	4–0	—	0–1	2–1	1–0	0–3	0–0	4–1	3–1	2–1
Guiseley Vixens	0–5	9–0	1–4	1–4	1–3	—	1–2	3–1	0–0	2–0	1–1	2–4	1–2
Huddersfield Town	3–4	11–0	3–2	6–1	4–1	5–2	—	4–1	4–2	6–0	2–0	1–1	2–3
Hull City	1–2	3–1	2–2	3–3	5–2	0–1	2–1	—	1–3	3–5	4–2	0–4	2–4
Middlesbrough	1–2	8–1	0–3	6–1	2–2	1–1	3–2	3–0	—	3–1	5–1	4–2	3–3
Nottingham Forest	2–5	3–0	1–1	1–1	1–0	1–3	1–2	0–1	1–2	—	1–2	3–1	0–6
Sheffield	0–7	2–0	0–1	1–1	3–0	1–2	2–3	4–2	2–3	1–2	—	2–0	1–3
Stoke City	0–4	7–3	1–1	5–0	2–2	1–2	3–4	4–1	4–1	1–1	2–2	—	4–4
Sunderland	3–0	10–1	5–2	5–0	0–1	4–1	1–2	6–2	3–1	8–0	5–2	2–3	—

Source: FA Full-Time
Legend: Blue = home team win; Yellow = draw; Red = away team win.

=== Southern Premier Division ===
FA Women's National League Southern Premier Division
- Season: 2018–19
- Champions: Coventry United
- Promoted: Coventry United
- Relegated: C & K Basildon

Map showing the locations of the teams in the Southern Division of the FA Women's National League

Changes from last season:

- League champions Charlton Athletic was promoted to FA Women's Championship.
- West Ham United was awarded a FA Women's Super League licence through application.
- Lewes was awarded a FA Women's Championship licence through application.
- Crystal Palace was awarded a FA Women's Championship licence through application after the withdrawal of Sheffield during the closed season.
- Oxford United and Watford were relegated from the FA WSL 2 after failing to retain a licence for Tier 2.
- Loughborough Foxes, Plymouth Argyle and Milton Keynes Dons were promoted into the Southern Division from Midlands Division One, South West Division One and South East Division One respectively.
- Swindon Town was relegated to Division One South West.

Team	Home ground	2017–18 position
C & K Basildon	The Frost Hire Stadium, Canvey Island	2nd
Cardiff City	CCB Centre for Sporting Excellence, Ystrad Mynach	10th
Chichester City	Oaklands Park, Chichester	8th
Coventry United	Butts Park Arena, Coventry	4th
Gillingham	Maidstone Road Sports Ground, Chatham	9th
Loughborough Foxes	Loughborough University Stadium, Loughborough	1st in Midlands Division One (promoted)
Milton Keynes Dons	Stadium MK, Milton Keynes	1st in South East Division One (promoted)
Oxford United	Marsh Lane, Marston	8th in WSL 2 (relegated)
Plymouth Argyle	Haye Road, Plymouth	1st in South West Division One (promoted)
Portsmouth	Kendall's Stadium, Portsmouth	6th
Queens Park Rangers	Honeycroft, West Drayton, London	11th
Watford	CRY Community Stadium, Kings Langley	10th in WSL 2 (relegated)

==== League table ====
Pos	Team	Pld	W	D	L	GF	GA	GD	Pts	Promotion or relegation
1	Coventry United (C, P)	22	18	3	1	80	14	+66	57	Promotion to the Championship, qualification for the Championship play-off
2	Cardiff City	22	16	2	4	58	26	+32	50	
3	Chichester City	22	15	1	6	48	27	+21	46	
4	Oxford United	22	13	2	7	56	24	+32	41	
5	Watford	22	13	1	8	43	40	+3	40	
6	Plymouth Argyle	22	11	2	9	50	54	−4	35	
7	Loughborough Foxes	22	10	4	8	48	32	+16	34	
8	Portsmouth	22	9	1	12	41	38	+3	28	
9	Milton Keynes Dons	22	6	1	15	28	52	−24	19	
10	Gillingham	22	5	4	13	24	54	−30	19	
11	Queens Park Rangers	22	2	5	15	28	69	−41	11	
12	C & K Basildon (R)	22	0	2	20	17	91	−74	2	Relegation to the Division One South East

Source: FA Full-Time
Rules for classification: 1) Points; 2) Goal difference; 3) Number of goals scored
(C) Champions; (P) Promoted; (R) Relegated

==== Results ====
Home \ Away	C&K	CAR	CHI	CVU	GIL	LFO	MKD	OXF	PLY	POR	QPR	WAT
C & K Basildon	—	0–5	0–8	0–6	1–3	0–2	1–2	0–2	0–2	0–6	3–3	0–1
Cardiff City	7–0	—	4–2	1–1	2–0	3–1	2–1	1–1	3–2	2–1	5–1	1–0
Chichester City	4–2	1–0	—	1–2	2–0	1–3	5–2	2–1	2–1	2–1	3–0	1–0
Coventry United	4–1	4–1	2–3	—	9–0	4–0	4–0	2–0	9–1	4–0	1–1	4–0
Gillingham	5–3	0–2	2–2	0–0	—	2–2	2–0	0–5	1–4	0–2	2–0	0–1
Loughborough Foxes	1–1	1–0	0–1	0–2	5–0	—	6–0	1–1	2–4	2–1	7–0	1–2
Milton Keynes Dons	4–0	1–2	0–1	0–3	1–0	1–3	—	0–3	3–4	1–3	3–2	1–2
Oxford United	12–0	2–3	1–0	1–2	1–0	4–2	1–3	—	2–1	2–1	7–1	1–2
Plymouth Argyle	5–3	2–3	0–3	2–5	1–1	0–4	3–1	1–0	—	2–2	4–3	3–2
Portsmouth	2–0	0–3	3–1	1–2	4–1	2–0	4–0	0–2	0–3	—	1–0	2–4
Queens Park Rangers	4–1	0–6	2–3	1–7	1–3	2–2	1–1	0–3	2–3	2–1	—	1–1
Watford	3–1	5–2	1–0	0–3	6–2	1–3	0–3	2–4	3–2	5–4	2–1	—

Source: FA Full-Time
Legend: Blue = home team win; Yellow = draw; Red = away team win.

=== Championship play-off ===
The overall FA WNL champion will be decided by a play-off match to be held at the end of the season. Both sides will also earn promotion to the FA Women's Championship subject to meeting licensing requirements.

18 May 2019
15:00 BST (UTC+01:00)

Blackburn Rovers	3–0	Coventry United
Jordan 41'; Flint 54'; Fenton 71'	Report

Valley Parade, Bradford
Attendance: 539
Referee: Rebecca Welch

== Division One ==
=== Division One North ===
FA Women's National League Division One North
- Season: 2018–19
- Champions: Burnley
- Relegated: Morecambe; Crewe Alexandra

Map showing the locations of the teams in the Division One North of the FA Women's National League

Changes from last season:

- Hull City was promoted to the Northern Division.
- Norton & Stockton Ancients was promoted from the North East Regional League.
- Burnley was promoted from the North West Regional League.
- Mossley Hill was relegated to the regional leagues.

Team	Home ground	2017–18 position
Barnsley	Barnsley FC Academy, Barnsley	11th
Bolton Wanderers	Kensite Stadium, Atherton	4th
Brighouse Town	The Yorkshire Payments Stadium, Brighouse	2nd
Burnley	Arbories Memorial Sports Ground, Padiham	1st in North West Regional League (promoted)
Chester-le-Street	Moor Park, Chester Moor	9th
Chorley	Victory Park Stadium, Chorley	6th
Crewe Alexandra	Cumberland Arena, Crewe	8th
Leeds United	Leeds United F.C. Training Ground, Wetherby	10th
Liverpool Feds	I.M. Marsh Campus, Liverpool	3rd
Morecambe	Lancaster & Morecambe College, Lancaster	7th
Newcastle United	Druid Park, Newcastle upon Tyne	5th
Norton & Stockton Ancients	Norton Teesside Sports Complex, Stockton-on-Tees	1st in North East Regional League (promoted)

==== League table ====
Pos	Team	Pld	W	D	L	GF	GA	GD	Pts	Promotion or relegation
1	Burnley (C, P)	22	18	2	2	39	14	+25	56	Promotion to the Northern Premier Division
2	Brighouse Town	22	12	7	3	44	20	+24	43	
3	Chester-le-Street	22	13	3	6	40	27	+13	42	
4	Barnsley	22	12	5	5	52	34	+18	41	
5	Liverpool Feds	22	10	5	7	57	39	+18	35	
6	Leeds United	22	10	4	8	34	28	+6	34	
7	Chorley	22	8	4	10	33	35	−2	28	
8	Bolton Wanderers	22	7	5	10	24	27	−3	26	
9	Newcastle United	22	7	4	11	28	31	−3	25	
10	Norton & Stockton Ancients	22	7	2	13	51	57	−6	23	
11	Morecambe (R)	22	3	5	14	35	69	−34	14	Relegation from the National League
12	Crewe Alexandra (R)	22	1	2	19	15	71	−56	5	Relegation from the National League

Source: FA Full-Time
Rules for classification: 1) Points; 2) Goal difference; 3) Number of goals scored
(C) Champions; (P) Promoted; (R) Relegated

==== Results ====
Home \ Away	BAR	BOL	BRI	BUR	CLS	CHO	CRE	LEE	LMF	MOR	NEW	NSA
Barnsley	—	0–1	1–1	0–1	2–0	3–1	8–0	2–1	2–1	3–1	0–0	2–1
Bolton Wanderers	2–2	—	0–0	0–1	0–2	0–1	0–0	4–0	2–3	2–1	2–1	3–0
Brighouse Town	2–1	2–1	—	0–0	0–2	2–2	5–0	1–1	0–2	1–1	3–1	5–3
Burnley	3–1	0–1	1–0	—	0–3	1–0	4–0	1–1	2–0	3–0	2–1	2–1
Chester-le-Street	3–1	2–1	0–3	0–1	—	1–0	2–0	1–2	1–1	6–0	0–1	1–5
Chorley	1–5	1–1	0–2	0–1	2–3	—	3–1	4–1	1–1	3–0	0–0	5–4
Crewe Alexandra	2–3	1–0	0–4	0–3	1–2	0–4	—	0–1	3–5	2–2	1–3	1–3
Leeds United	2–2	0–0	1–3	0–1	1–3	3–0	4–0	—	1–2	1–0	3–1	3–1
Liverpool Feds	4–5	5–0	2–2	0–3	2–2	1–2	5–0	1–0	—	10–2	1–2	3–2
Morecambe	3–3	1–2	0–3	2–3	1–2	2–0	5–2	1–4	3–3	—	2–1	1–4
Newcastle United	1–2	2–1	1–2	0–1	2–2	1–2	2–0	0–1	0–3	5–1	—	1–0
Norton & Stockton Ancients	3–4	2–1	0–3	4–5	1–2	2–1	3–1	0–3	4–2	6–6	2–2	—

Source: FA Full-Time
Legend: Blue = home team win; Yellow = draw; Red = away team win.

=== Division One Midlands ===
FA Women's National League Division One Midlands
- Season: 2018–19
- Champions: West Bromwich Albion
- Promoted: West Bromwich Albion
- Relegated: Steel City Wanderers

Map showing the locations of the teams in Division One Midlands of the FA Women's National League

Changes from last season:

- Loughborough Foxes was promoted to the Southern Division.
- Sheffield United was awarded a FA Women's Championship licence through application.
- West Bromwich Albion and Wolverhampton Wanderers were relegated from the Northern Division.
- Bedworth United was promoted from the West Midlands Regional League.
- Nettleham was promoted from the East Midlands Regional League.
- Leicester City Ladies and Rotherham United were relegated to the regional leagues.
- Radcliffe Olympic withdrew from the league before the season started.

Team	Home ground	2017–18 position
Bedworth United	The Oval, Bedworth	1st in West Midlands Regional League (promoted)
Birmingham & West Midlands	Castle Vale Stadium, Birmingham	9th
Burton Albion	The Lamb Ground, Tamworth	2nd
Long Eaton United	Grange Park, Long Eaton	6th
Nettleham	Mulsanne Park, Nettleham	1st in East Midlands Regional League (promoted)
Solihull	West Midland Sports & Social Club, Birmingham	7th
Sporting Khalsa	The Aspray Arena, Willenhall	8th
Steel City Wanderers	St George's Park Thorncliffe, Sheffield	10th
The New Saints	Park Hall Stadium, Oswestry	5th
West Bromwich Albion	Trevor Brown Memorial Ground, Sutton Coldfield	12th in Northern Division (relegated)
Wolverhampton Wanderers	Queen Street Stadium, Bilston	11th in Northern Division (relegated)

==== League table ====
Pos	Team	Pld	W	D	L	GF	GA	GD	Pts	Promotion or relegation
1	West Bromwich Albion (C, P)	20	19	0	1	97	15	+82	57	Northern Premier Division
2	Wolverhampton Wanderers	20	17	0	3	98	14	+84	51	
3	Birmingham & West Midlands	20	13	2	5	68	26	+42	41	
4	Sporting Khalsa	20	11	3	6	49	40	+9	36	
5	Bedworth United	20	11	1	8	46	46	0	34	
6	Long Eaton United	20	9	2	9	48	41	+7	29	
7	Nettleham	20	9	1	10	38	43	−5	28	
8	The New Saints	20	8	1	11	57	49	+8	25	
9	Burton Albion	20	4	3	13	30	71	−41	15	
10	Solihull	20	2	0	18	18	88	−70	6	
11	Steel City Wanderers (R)	20	0	1	19	11	127	−116	1	Relegation from FA Women's National League.

Source: FA Full-Time
Rules for classification: 1) Points; 2) Goal difference; 3) Number of goals scored
(C) Champions; (P) Promoted; (R) Relegated

==== Results ====
Home \ Away	BED	BWM	BRT	LEU	NET	SOL	SPK	SCW	TNS	WBA	WOL
Bedworth United	—	2–1	5–1	3–4	2–1	5–1	3–3	2–1	1–3	0–5	2–1
Birmingham & West Midlands	4–0	—	3–0	2–2	2–1	9–2	2–1	7–1	4–1	0–1	1–3
Burton Albion	1–7	2–2	—	0–4	2–3	7–1	0–4	4–1	2–2	0–6	1–4
Long Eaton United	2–1	1–4	3–0	—	0–0	4–1	1–2	8–0	3–4	1–4	0–1
Nettleham	2–3	0–4	3–0	1–2	—	5–1	2–3	6–2	4–1	1–2	0–6
Solihull	1–4	1–2	0–2	2–3	1–2	—	0–2	2–1	0–4	0–11	0–3
Sporting Khalsa	4–1	2–0	2–2	3–2	2–3	6–2	—	4–0	3–0	0–3	2–10
Steel City Wanderers	0–2	0–11	2–4	0–4	0–2	0–3	1–1	—	1–6	1–18	0–11
The New Saints	1–2	1–5	9–1	4–3	0–1	3–0	0–4	14–0	—	3–4	0–4
West Bromwich Albion	1–0	4–2	2–1	2–1	7–1	8–0	5–0	7–0	4–1	—	2–0
Wolverhampton Wanderers	9–1	1–3	8–0	7–0	3–0	7–0	3–1	11–0	3–0	3–1	—

Source: FA Full-Time
Legend: Blue = home team win; Yellow = draw; Red = away team win.

=== Division One South East ===
FA Women's National League Division One South East
- Season: 2018–19
- Champions: Crawley Wasps
- Promoted: Crawley Wasps
- Relegated: Denham United; Luton Town

Map showing the locations of the teams in Division One South East of the FA Women's National League

Changes from last season:

- Milton Keynes Dons was promoted to the Southern Division.
- Billericay Town was promoted from the Eastern Region League.
- Crawley Wasps was promoted from the London & South East Regional League.
- Haringey Borough was relegated to the regional leagues.

Team	Home ground	2017–18 position
Actonians	Rectory Park, Northolt	7th
AFC Wimbledon	War Memorial Sports Ground, Sutton	2nd
Billericay Town	AGP Arena, Billericay	1st in Eastern Region League (promoted)
Cambridge United	Recreation Way, Mildenhall	8th
Crawley Wasps	Tinsley Lane, Crawley	1st in London & South East Regional League (promoted)
Denham United	The Den, Denham	9th
Enfield Town	Queen Elizabeth II Stadium, Enfield	10th
Ipswich Town	The Goldstar Ground, Felixstowe	3rd
Leyton Orient	Mile End Stadium, Bow, London	4th
Luton Town	Stockwood Park Athletics Stadium, Luton	5th
Norwich City	Plantation Park, Blofield	11th
Stevenage	Hertingfordbury Park, Hertford	6th

==== League table ====
Pos	Team	Pld	W	D	L	GF	GA	GD	Pts	Promotion or relegation
1	Crawley Wasps (C, P)	22	19	2	1	88	11	+77	59	Promotion to the Southern Premier Division
2	Billericay Town	22	15	3	4	54	29	+25	48	
3	Enfield Town	22	10	5	7	41	29	+12	35	
4	Actonians	22	10	3	9	58	53	+5	33	
5	Leyton Orient	22	9	5	8	39	37	+2	32	
6	AFC Wimbledon	22	9	5	8	36	39	−3	32	
7	Ipswich Town	22	7	7	8	39	42	−3	28	
8	Cambridge United	22	7	6	9	32	35	−3	27	
9	Stevenage	22	8	3	11	29	50	−21	27	
10	Norwich City	22	6	3	13	34	54	−20	21	
11	Denham United (R)	22	3	7	12	15	53	−38	16	Relegation from the National League.
12	Luton Town (R)	22	3	3	16	19	52	−33	12	Relegation from the National League.

Source: FA Full-Time
Rules for classification: 1) Points; 2) Goal difference; 3) Number of goals scored
(C) Champions; (P) Promoted; (R) Relegated

==== Results ====
Home \ Away	ACT	WIM	BIL	CAM	CRA	DEN	ENF	IPS	LEY	LUT	NOR	STE
Actonians	—	0–1	4–4	1–1	0–4	5–1	0–2	1–5	3–3	3–0	5–2	5–1
AFC Wimbledon	2–5	—	2–1	1–1	0–4	4–0	3–2	1–1	1–3	1–4	4–2	1–2
Billericay Town	6–3	1–0	—	2–1	0–2	6–0	3–2	1–1	2–1	2–1	1–0	6–1
Cambridge United	5–1	3–0	0–2	—	0–0	1–2	0–3	2–3	1–2	1–0	1–0	0–0
Crawley Wasps	5–0	5–2	0–1	6–1	—	9–0	1–0	5–1	4–1	6–0	8–0	7–0
Denham United	0–5	0–0	0–3	1–2	1–1	—	0–0	1–3	1–1	0–0	1–2	1–2
Enfield Town	1–2	0–3	2–2	3–2	0–1	2–0	—	3–1	4–0	0–0	5–1	4–0
Ipswich Town	0–5	0–2	2–0	2–2	1–2	4–0	3–3	—	1–1	5–2	0–1	2–2
Leyton Orient	3–2	2–2	1–3	0–3	1–2	0–2	5–0	2–2	—	3–0	4–1	2–3
Luton Town	0–3	1–3	2–4	2–4	0–3	1–1	0–2	3–1	0–1	—	2–1	0–1
Norwich City	2–3	1–1	4–2	3–0	0–6	2–2	2–2	3–0	0–1	4–1	—	1–2
Stevenage	5–2	1–2	0–2	1–1	2–7	0–1	0–1	0–1	0–2	3–0	3–2	—

Source: FA Full-Time
Legend: Blue = home team win; Yellow = draw; Red = away team win.

=== Division One South West ===
FA Women's National League Division One South West
- Season: 2018–19
- Champions: Keynsham Town
- Promoted: Keynsham Town
- Relegated: N/A

Map showing the locations of the teams in Division One South West of the FA Women's National League

Changes from last season:

- Plymouth Argyle was promoted to the Southern Division.
- Swindon Town was relegated from the Southern Division.
- Chesham United was promoted from the Southern Region League.
- Buckland Athletic was promoted from the South West Regional League.
- Basingstoke withdrew from the league during the 2017–18 season.

Team	Home ground	2017–18 position
Brislington	Brislington Stadium, Brislington	6th
Buckland Athletic	Homers Heath, Newton Abbot	1st in South West Regional League (promoted)
Cheltenham Town	Petersfield Park, Cheltenham	9th
Chesham United	The Meadow, Chesham	1st in Southern Region League (promoted)
Keynsham Town	The AJN Stadium, Keynsham	3rd
Larkhall Athletic	Plain Ham, Larkhall	7th
Maidenhead United	York Road Stadium, Maidenhead	8th
Poole Town	Dorset County F.A. County Ground, Poole	5th
Southampton Saints	Universal Stadium, Sholing	4th
Southampton Women	Gang Warily Recreation Ground, Southampton	2nd
St Nicholas^{[note]}	Lodge Road, Yate	10th
Swindon Town	Cinder Lane, Fairford	12th in Southern Division (relegated)

^{[note]} St Nicholas withdrew from the league after the first weekend without playing a match due to a lack of numbers.

==== League table ====
Pos	Team	Pld	W	D	L	GF	GA	GD	Pts	Promotion or relegation
1	Keynsham Town (C, P)	20	17	2	1	115	15	+100	53	Promotion to the Southern Premier Division
2	Southampton Women's	20	15	1	4	68	16	+52	46	
3	Cheltenham Town	20	12	5	3	54	26	+28	41	
4	Buckland Athletic	19	12	3	4	62	36	+26	39	
5	Chesham United	20	11	2	7	57	38	+19	35	
6	Larkhall Athletic	20	7	6	7	38	43	−5	27	
7	Brislington	20	6	4	10	39	62	−23	22	
8	Southampton Saints	19	6	0	13	23	53	−30	18	Club disbanded at the end of the season
9	Swindon Town	20	4	3	13	18	52	−34	15	
10	Maidenhead United	20	2	2	16	14	71	−57	8	
11	Poole Town	20	2	2	16	21	97	−76	8	
12	St Nicholas (X)	0	0	0	0	0	0	0	0	Club withdrew from the league

Source: FA Full-Time
Rules for classification: 1) Points; 2) Goal difference; 3) Number of goals scored
(C) Champions; (P) Promoted; (X) ?

==== Results ====
Home \ Away	BRI	BLA	CHT	CHU	KEY	LAR	MAI	POO	SOS	SOW	SWT	STN
Brislington	—	1–6	4–7	3–2	0–7	1–1	3–1	1–1	2–1	0–3	2–1	X–X
Buckland Athletic	2–1	—	3–2	8–4	1–4	3–3	3–0	5–1	H–W	2–1	2–0	X–X
Cheltenham Town	2–2	2–2	—	0–1	1–1	2–0	5–1	6–2	2–1	1–0	2–2	X–X
Chesham United	3–0	4–3	0–4	—	1–1	1–1	5–0	6–1	8–0	2–3	1–0	X–X
Keynsham Town	6–0	9–0	6–2	7–1	—	4–0	11–0	9–0	3–1	0–3	4–0	X–X
Larkhall Athletic	3–3	2–1	1–1	4–0	2–9	—	3–0	7–0	3–2	0–5	2–1	X–X
Maidenhead United	2–5	1–8	0–3	0–2	2–5	0–3	—	0–0	3–0	0–3	2–2	X–X
Poole Town	3–5	0–5	0–7	1–5	0–14	6–3	3–0	—	1–4	0–5	0–2	X–X
Southampton Saints	4–2	0–2	0–2	0–5	0–5	1–0	0–1	3–0	—	1–7	3–1	X–X
Southampton Women's	4–2	0–0	0–1	2–1	1–5	3–0	5–0	8–1	5–0	—	5–0	X–X
Swindon Town	3–2	1–6	0–2	0–5	0–5	0–0	2–1	2–1	1–2	0–5	—	X–X
St Nicholas	X–X	X–X	X–X	X–X	X–X	X–X	X–X	X–X	X–X	X–X	X–X	—

Source: FA Full-Time
Legend: Blue = home team win; Yellow = draw; Red = away team win.

== Reserve Division ==
=== Reserve Northern Division One ===
Map showing the locations of the teams in the Reserve Northern Division One of the FA Women's National League
- Sheffield and Sunderland withdrew their entries before the season started.
- Hull City was moved from Reserve Northern Division Two to Reserve Northern Division One before the season started after the withdrawal of Sheffield and Sunderland.
- Bradford City withdrew from the league during winter 2018–19. All results involving Bradford City were expunged.

==== League table ====
Pos	Team	Pld	W	D	L	GF	GA	GD	Pts	
1	Blackburn Rovers Development (C)	18	15	2	1	70	18	+52	47	
2	Sheffield United Second	18	13	3	2	95	27	+68	42	
3	Newcastle United Reserve	18	10	2	6	47	33	+14	32	
4	Huddersfield Town Development	17	7	2	8	41	44	−3	23	
5	Durham Reserves	17	6	1	10	33	46	−13	19	
6	Middlesbrough Reserves	18	4	2	12	37	57	−20	14	
7	Hull City Reserves	18	1	0	17	13	111	−98	3	
8	Bradford City Reserves (X)	0	0	0	0	0	0	0	0	Resigned from league. Record expunged.

Source: FA Full-Time
Rules for classification: 1) Points; 2) Goal difference; 3) Number of goals scored
(C) Champions; (X) Resigned

==== Results ====
Home \ Away	BLB	DUR	HUD	HUL	MID	NEW	SHU
Blackburn Rovers	—	5–0; 2–1	3–2	5–0	6–0; 4–1	2–0	2–5; 2–2
Durham	2–4	—	1–3	4–0	0–2; 2–0	2–4; 1–1	1–0; 1–10
Huddersfield Town	1–2; 0–9	3–2	—	5–1; 5–0	4–4	2–0; 2–3	3–5
Hull City	1–5; 1–9	2–5; 0–6	2–3	—	2–1; 1–5	1–7; 1–3	0–4
Middlesbrough	0–5	1–4	0–4; H–W	10–0	—	2–4; 2–5	1–3
Newcastle United	0–2; 0–1	3–0	5–2	4–1	2–2	—	2–6; 2–3
Sheffield United	2–2	6–1	1–1; 6–1	14–0; 16–0	6–5; 5–1	1–2	—

Source: FA Full-Time
Legend: Blue = home team win; Yellow = draw; Red = away team win.

=== Reserve Northern Division Two ===
Map showing the locations of the teams in the Reserve Northern Division Two of the FA Women's National League
- Bolton Wanderers withdrew their entry at the start of the season.
- Hull City was moved to Reserve Northern Division Two to Reserve Northern Division One before the season started after the withdrawal of Sheffield and Sunderland.
- Fylde withdrew from the league during winter 2018–19. All results involving Fylde were expunged.

==== League table ====
Pos	Team	Pld	W	D	L	GF	GA	GD	Pts	
1	Chorley Development (C)	15	12	0	3	55	24	+31	36	
2	Guiseley Vixens Reserves	15	12	0	3	45	16	+29	36	
3	Brighouse Town EDS	15	11	0	4	52	24	+28	33	
4	Leeds United Reserves	15	5	0	10	29	45	−16	15	
5	Barnsley Reserves	15	3	1	11	31	55	−24	10	
6	Burnley Reserves	15	1	1	13	19	67	−48	4	
7	Fylde Reserves (X)	0	0	0	0	0	0	0	0	Resigned from league. Record expunged.

Source: FA Full-Time
Rules for classification: 1) Points; 2) Goal difference; 3) Number of goals scored
(C) Champions; (X) Resigned

==== Results ====
Home \ Away	BAR	BRI	BUR	CHO	GUI	LEE
Barnsley	—	3–5	4–0	1–4; 2–7	0–3; 2–5	1–3
Brighouse Town	7–1; 4–0	—	2–0; 5–0	3–4; 2–4	0–1	5–4
Burnley	5–5; 1–4	1–3	—	1–5	0–5	1–6; 5–1
Chorley	2–1	3–2	7–1; 4–2	—	0–1	5–1
Guiseley Vixens	5–2	2–4; 0–4	5–1; 7–0	2–1; 2–0	—	4–1; 3–0
Leeds United	3–2; 1–3	1–3; 0–3	4–1	1–5; 2–4	1–0	—

Source: FA Full-Time
Legend: Blue = home team win; Yellow = draw; Red = away team win.

=== Reserve Midland Division ===
Map showing the locations of the teams in Reserve Midland Division One of the FA Women's National League
- The New Saints withdrew their entry before the season started.

==== League table ====
Pos	Team	Pld	W	D	L	GF	GA	GD	Pts
1	Stoke City Reserves (C)	20	17	0	3	84	17	+67	51
2	Derby County Development	20	15	4	1	116	22	+94	49
3	Leicester City WFC Reserves	19	15	1	3	71	18	+53	46
4	West Bromwich Albion	20	11	4	5	62	25	+37	37
5	Loughborough Foxes Development	19	9	4	6	62	34	+28	31
6	Coventry United	19	9	2	8	60	44	+16	29
7	Nottingham Forest Reserves	20	6	3	11	32	59	−27	21
8	Sporting Khalsa	18	5	1	12	39	101	−62	16
9	Burton Albion Reserves	19	3	3	13	26	89	−63	12
10	Crewe Alexandra Development	20	2	5	13	23	69	−46	11
11	Long Eaton United Reserves	20	1	1	18	9	106	−97	4

Source: FA Full-Time
Rules for classification: 1) Points; 2) Goal difference; 3) Number of goals scored
(C) Champions

==== Results ====
Home \ Away	BRT	CVU	CRE	DER	LCW	LEU	LFO	NOT	SPK	STK	WBA
Burton Albion	—	0–11	1–1	0–3	0–13	3–0	2–2	4–1	2–4	1–7	0–1
Coventry United		—	1–0	2–9	0–6	8–0	2–3	3–1	8–0	0–2	1–0
Crewe Alexandra	3–3	1–1	—	0–2	1–3	6–1	0–4	1–3	3–2	1–4	0–2
Derby County	6–0	8–3	12–1	—	2–0	9–0	3–3	9–1	16–0	2–3	1–1
Leicester City WFC	4–1	3–1	9–1	0–1	—	4–0	3–4	2–0		1–0	2–1
Long Eaton United	0–2	0–7	1–1	0–10	1–5	—	0–9	1–2	1–6	0–10	0–5
Loughborough Foxes	8–2	2–2	7–0	2–2	1–2	2–3	—	0–1		1–4	4–0
Nottingham Forest	4–2	0–6	2–2	2–3	1–4	1–0	0–3	—	3–1	1–2	3–3
Sporting Khalsa	5–2	2–4	3–1	0–11	0–6	6–0	2–6	5–5	—	0–17	1–3
Stoke City	11–0	2–0	2–0	1–4	1–2	5–1	3–0	2–0	4–1	—	2–1
West Bromwich Albion	5–1	5–0	6–0	3–3	2–2	5–0	3–1	6–1	9–1	1–2	—

Source: FA Full-Time
Legend: Blue = home team win; Yellow = draw; Red = away team win.

=== Reserve South/South East Division ===
Map showing the locations of the teams in Reserve South/South East Division of the FA Women's National League
- West Ham United withdrew their entry at the start of the season.
- Ipswich Town withdrew from the league during autumn 2018. All results involving Ipswich Town were expunged.

==== League table ====
Pos	Team	Pld	W	D	L	GF	GA	GD	Pts	
1	Tottenham Hotspur Reserves (C)	13	12	1	0	67	9	+58	37	
2	Charlton Athletic Development	14	12	1	1	67	14	+53	37	
3	Millwall Lionesses Development	14	7	1	6	26	26	0	22	
4	Gillingham Development	14	7	1	6	22	28	−6	22	
5	Watford U23	14	6	1	7	38	30	+8	19	
6	Cambridge United Reserves	13	3	1	9	16	37	−21	10	
7	Milton Keynes Dons Development	14	3	1	10	19	44	−25	10	
8	Norwich City U19 Development	14	1	1	12	12	79	−67	4	
9	Ipswich Town Reserves (X)	0	0	0	0	0	0	0	0	Resigned from league. Record expunged.

Source: FA Full-Time
Rules for classification: 1) Points; 2) Goal difference; 3) Number of goals scored
(C) Champions; (X) Resigned

==== Results ====
Home \ Away	CAM	CHA	GIL	MIL	MKD	NOR	TOT	WAT
Cambridge United	—	1–3	0–2	0–3	1–0	3–3	1–3	0–4
Charlton Athletic	10–2	—	4–0	4–0	11–1	7–0	1–4	2–1
Gillingham	0–4	0–3	—	1–0	3–2	1–0	0–3	4–1
Millwall Lionesses	3–1	0–2	1–3	—	3–1	2–0	1–7	2–1
Milton Keynes Dons	0–1	1–4	2–2	1–2	—	3–0	2–4	2–1
Norwich City	4–2	2–10	1–3	1–8	1–3	—	0–14	0–12
Tottenham Hotspur		1–1	3–1	3–0	6–0	8–0	—	5–1
Watford	2–0	1–5	4–2	1–1	5–1	3–0	1–6	—

Source: FA Full-Time
Legend: Blue = home team win; Yellow = draw; Red = away team win.

=== Reserve South/South West Division ===
Map showing the locations of the teams in Reserve South/South West Division of the FA Women's National League
- Poole Town withdrew from the league during autumn 2018. All results involving Poole Town were expunged.

==== League table ====
Pos	Team	Pld	W	D	L	GF	GA	GD	Pts	
1	Crystal Palace (C)	17	14	2	1	71	19	+52	44	
2	AFC Wimbledon Reserves	18	12	3	3	49	20	+29	39	
3	Chichester City Development	18	10	4	4	62	21	+41	34	
4	Lewes Development	17	8	3	6	44	31	+13	27	
5	Queens Park Rangers	18	3	4	11	28	46	−18	13	
6	Southampton WFC Reserves (Note: Southampton Women had one point deducted for fielding an ineligible player in their home match against Queens Park Rangers on 4 November 2018)	18	2	5	11	22	52	−30	10	
7	Denham United Reserves	16	0	3	13	11	96	−85	3	
8	Poole Town Development (X)	0	0	0	0	0	0	0	0	Resigned from league. Record expunged.

Source: FA Full-Time
Rules for classification: 1) Points; 2) Goal difference; 3) Number of goals scored
(C) Champions; (X) Resigned

==== Results ====
Home \ Away	WIM	CHI	CRY	DEN	LEW	QPR	SOW
AFC Wimbledon	—	2–1	2–2; 2–1	3–2; 8–0	0–1	3–1	5–2
Chichester City	3–1; 1–2	—	3–3	9–0	2–0	7–0; 3–0	2–0; 1–1
Crystal Palace	2–1	6–2; 4–0	—	9–1	3–1	2–0	4–0; 6–3
Denham United	1–1	0–14; 0–4	0–8	—	1–7	2–7	2–2; 1–5
Lewes	1–3; 2–2	0–4; 1–1	2–3; 2–5	8–0	—	4–1; 4–1	3–0
Queens Park Rangers	0–4; 0–1	1–1	1–4; 1–4	4–0; 7–1	1–1	—	0–2; 2–2
Southampton WFC	0–1; 0–8	0–4	0–5	0–0	1–3; 3–4	1–1	—

Source: FA Full-Time
Legend: Blue = home team win; Yellow = draw; Red = away team win.
