= 2014–15 FA Women's Premier League Plate =

WPL Plate

Tournament details
- Country: England
- Teams: 33

Final positions
- Champions: Preston North End
- Runners-up: Huddersfield Town

Tournament statistics
- Matches played: 29
- Goals scored: 124 (4.28 per match)

The 2014–15 FA Women's Premier League Plate was the inaugural season of the Premier League Plate, which was introduced as a secondary League Cup competition of the FA Women's Premier League (FA WPL).

Preston North End became the first ever winners of the Plate, beating Huddersfield Town 3–0 in the final at Guiseley's Nethermoor Park to win their first major trophy.

The teams that took part in the WPL plate were decided after the first qualifying round of the WPL Cup, known as the Determining Round. The winners of Determining Round matches continued in the WPL Cup, while the losers moved into the WPL Plate.

== Background ==
Due to a restructuring of elite-level women's football in England in 2014, the WPL had doubled in size from three divisions to six. With this in mind the league opted to introduce a new cup competition to run alongside their existing League Cup competition, the Premier League Cup, to cater for the increased number of teams.

Seventy teams were entered into the Determining Round of the FA WPL Cup, with the 35 match losers being eligible for the Plate, but two teams (Keynsham Town development and Norwich City) withdrew from the competition, meaning only 33 teams took part.

== Results ==
All results shown here were published by The Football Association. Games are listed firstly in chronological order, and then by alphabetical order of the home team. The division each team played in is shown in Brackets after their name: (N)=Northern Division; (S)=Southern Division; (N1)=Northern Division One; (M1)=Midlands Division One; (SE1)=South East Division One; (SW1)=South West Division One.

=== Preliminary round ===
14 September 2014	Leafield Athletic (M1)	2–0	Stockport County (N1)	Shirley
14:00	Hughes 30'; Hawkins 65'	Report		Stadium: Rumbush Stadium

Walkover	Southampton Saints (SW1)	H–W	Chorley (N1)
		Report

All other teams were given a bye to the first round of the competition.

=== First round ===
12 October 2014	Leeds (N1)	2–4 (a.e.t.)	Southampton Saints (SW1)	Ossett
12:30	Huegett 14', 28'	Report	Why 20'; Bath 84'; Whitlock 101', 114'	Stadium: Ingfield

12 October 2014	Chester-le-Street (N1)	6–0	Curzon Ashton (M1)	Chester Moor
14:00	Darmody; Ground-Harvey; Hopkins; Taylor	Report		Stadium: Moor Park

12 October 2014	Copsewood (Coventry) (S)	8–0	Gosport Borough (SW1)	Coventry
14:00	Williams 20', 82'; Dean 28'; Knight 52', 57', 78'; Rowles 63'; Riley 71'	Report		Stadium: Copsewood Sports & Social Club

12 October 2014	Crystal Palace (SE1)	2–4	Swindon Town (SW1)	London
14:00	Shakes 30'; Dyett 50'	Report	Thompson 15', 54'; 40'; Attenborough 71'	Stadium: Crystal Palace National Sports Centre

12 October 2014	Enfield Town (SE1)	5–0	Cheltenham Town (SW1)	Enfield
14:00	Demery; Kent; Slater; (o.g.); (o.g.)	Report		Stadium: Queen Elizabeth II Stadium

12 October 2014	Exeter City (SW1)	5–1	St Nicholas (SW1)	Exminster
14:00	17' (o.g.); Knapman 26', 77'; Kukor 45'; Chloe Williams 57'	Report	75' (o.g.)	Stadium: Minster Park; Attendance: 40

12 October 2014	Liverpool Marshall Feds (N1)	2–5	Huddersfield Town (N)	Liverpool
14:00	Evans	Report	Hastings 27', 59'; Nutter 40', 70'; Mallin 46'	Stadium: Heron Eccles Playing Field

12 October 2014	Loughborough Foxes (M1)	0–2	Milton Keynes Dons (SE1)	Loughborough
14:00		Report	Barrett; McDonell	Stadium: Loughborough University Stadium

12 October 2014	Middlesbrough (N1)	0–4	Preston North End (N)	Thornaby-on-Tees
14:00		Report	Ball 13', 87'; Rawcliffe 19'; Charlesworth 26'	Stadium: Teesdale Park

12 October 2014	Radcliffe Olympic (M1)	4–1	Stoke City (N)	Radcliffe-on-Trent
14:00	Bailey 20', 71'; Ramadan 36'; Saulter 68'	Report	Garside 63'	Stadium: Wharf Lane Recreation Ground

12 October 2014	Rotherham United (M1)	0–4	Loughborough Students (M1)	Rotherham
14:00		Report	Kempski; Payne; Thackray; (o.g.)	Stadium: Roundwood Sports Complex

12 October 2014	Sheffield United Community (N1)	4–3	Bedford (SE1)	Killamarsh
14:00	Fairfax 5', 56'; Skull 20'; Woodham 22'	Report	Fensome; Washington	Stadium: Killamarsh Juniors Athletic Club Institute

12 October 2014	Solihull (M1)	2–3	Leafield Athletic (M1)	Marston Green
14:00	Wilford 40'; Hunter 90+4'	Report	Dugmore; Fellows	Stadium: The Pavilion

23 November 2014	Chichester City (SW1)	0–1	Leicester City Ladies (M1)	Chichester
15:00		Report	Whalley	Stadium: Oaklands Park

Walkover	West Ham United (S)	H–W	Ebbsfleet United (SE1)
		Report

Shanklin were given a bye to the second round.

=== Second round ===
30 November 2014	Sheffield United Community (N1)	2–4	Exeter City (SW1)	Killamarsh
11:30	Bell 63'; Fairfax 81'	Report	Kukor 12'; Knapman 20', 49'; Garcia-Sánchez 47'	Stadium: Killamarsh Juniors Athletic Club Institute

30 November 2014	Copsewood (Coventry) (S)	0–1	Preston North End (N)	Coventry
14:00		Report	Flanagan 50'	Stadium: Copsewood Sports & Social Club

30 November 2014	Huddersfield Town (N)	5–1	Chester-le-Street (N1)	Kirkburton
14:00	Hastings 16', 63'; Mallin 18'; Brace 56', 80'	Report	Garbutt 45'	Stadium: Storthes Hall Park; Attendance: 40

30 November 2014	Leicester City Ladies (M1)	3–5 (a.e.t.)	Radcliffe Olympic (M1)	Hinckley
14:00	Ball 60', 75' (pen.); Burbridge 80'	Report	Ramadan 15'; Plummer 41'; Bailey 68' (pen.), 96'; Evans 109'	Stadium: Leicester Road Stadium

30 November 2014	Milton Keynes Dons (SE1)	3–0	Enfield Town (SE1)	Newport Pagnell
14:00	Wright; Dickens; McDonnell (pen.)	Report		Stadium: Willen Road

30 November 2014	Shanklin (SW1)	2–0	Loughborough Students (M1)	Shanklin
14:00	Treagus; Woodford	Report		Stadium: County Ground

30 November 2014	Southampton Saints (SW1)	1–2	Swindon Town (SW1)	Sholing
14:00	Lewry 65'	Report	Vella 23'; Maynard 90+3'	Stadium: Silverlake Arena; Attendance: 30

30 November 2014	West Ham United (S)	3–1	Leafield Athletic (M1)	Aveley
14:00	Little 41'; McCrea 85'; Smith 87'	Report	Goal	Stadium: Mill Field

=== Quarter-finals ===
8 February 2015	Exeter City (SW1)	1–3	West Ham United (S)	Exminster
13:00	Caunter 34' (pen.)	Report	Bottom 21'; Blanchflower 40'; Little 42'	Stadium: Minster Park

22 February 2015	Milton Keynes Dons (SE1)	0–1	Shanklin (SW1)	Newport Pagnell
14:00		Report	Parkes	Stadium: Willen Road

22 February 2015	Radcliffe Olympic (M1)	1–2	Huddersfield Town (N)	Radcliffe-on-Trent
14:00	Saulter 17'	Report	Heckler 52'; Conroy 55'	Stadium: Wharf Lane Recreation Ground

Walkover	Swindon Town (SW1)	A–W	Preston North End (N)
		Report

=== Semi-finals ===
1 March 2015
14:00

Huddersfield Town (N)	4–1	Shanklin (SW1)
Mallin 25'; Hastings 36'; Heckler 66', 80'	Report	Treagus 55'

Storthes Hall Park, Kirkburton
Attendance: 40

Huddersfield town reached the final of a major cup competition for the first time in their history thanks to a 4–1 victory over Isle of Wight side Shanklin, witnessed by a small crowd of just 40 people at the West Yorkshire club's Storthes Hall ground. It was their second cup semi-final win in quick succession, having recently also reached the final of the Sheffield & Hallamshire Women's Challenge Cup. Emily Heckler scored twice for Huddersfield, and Kate Mallin and Debbie Hastings each scored once. Rowan Treagus scored Shanklin's consolation goal. Midfielder Alarna Fuller was named Huddersfield's Player of the Match.

1 March 2015
14:00

Preston North End (N)	1–0	West Ham United (S)
Flanagan 80'	Report

Sir Tom Finney Stadium, Bamber Bridge

Preston North End earned their place as Huddersfield's opposition in the final through a 1–0 victory over West Ham United. The only goal of the game was scored by Preston's Chelsea Flanagan. West Ham, who were missing a number of regular first team players, rarely threatened the Preston goal, and eventually conceded the winning goal ten minutes from time.

=== Final ===
26 April 2015
15:00

Huddersfield Town (N)	0–3	Preston North End (N)
	Report	Swarbrick 44'; Savage 85'; Flanagan 90+5'

Nethermoor Park, Guiseley
Attendance: 256

Huddersfield Town	Preston North End

GK	Laura Carter
DF	Natalie Brace
DF	Camille Clarke
DF	Olivia DaCosta	(substituted off) 87'
DF	Kate Mallin
DF	Laura Windle	(substituted off) 59'
MF	Samantha Conroy
MF	Alarna Fuller
MF	Katie Nutter
FW	Debbie Hastings	(substituted off) 70'
FW	Emily Heckler
Substitutes:
DF	Victoria Abbott	(substituted on) 87'
DF	Bethanie Halligan
MF	Beth Jennings	(substituted on) 70'
MF	Katie Lockwood	(substituted on) 59'
MF	Leah White
Manager:
Glen Preston

GK	Danielle Brown
DF	Alice Forshaw
DF	Kerry Nickson
DF	Bethany Stanfield
MF	Aimee Cleaver	(substituted off) 70'
MF	Nicola Emery
MF	Rebecca Foster	(substituted off) 60'
MF	Yasmine Swarbrick	(substituted off) 81'
MF	Laura Walker
FW	Chelsea Flanagan
FW	Keeleigh Savage
Substitutes:
MF	Natasha Charlesworth	(substituted on) 70'
MF	Emily Hutton
MF	Holly Rawcliffe	(substituted on) 81'
FW	Sarah Chadwick	(substituted on) 60'
FW	Jade Parker
Manager:
Luke Podmore

Huddersfield were beaten 3–0 in the final by Preston North End, who were winners of a major trophy for the first time in their history. The final was played at Guiseley's Nethermoor Park ground as part of a double-header with the FA Women's Premier League Reserves Cup, which was played in the morning before the Plate final. Spectators were allowed into the ground to watch both games for free.
