= Loughborough Lightning F.C. =

Association football club in England

Coordinates: 52°45′7.301″N 1°14′3.156″W

Loughborough Lightning
- Full name: Loughborough Lightning Football Club
- Nickname: Lightning
- Founded: 1999 (as Shepshed Foxes)
- Ground: Loughborough University Stadium, Loughborough
- Capacity: 3,300
- Manager: Charles Baxter
- League: FA Women's National League North
- 2025–26: FA Women's National League North, 10th of 12
- Website: https://www.lboro.ac.uk/sport/performance/lightning/football/
Home colours	Away colours

Loughborough Lightning Football Club (formerly Loughborough Foxes) is a football club based in Loughborough, Leicestershire, England. They are currently members of the FA Women's National League North and play at the Loughborough University Stadium.

== History ==
The club was founded in 1999 as Shepshed Foxes by Gail and Paul Fox, who wanted to give girls in the surrounding area an opportunity to play football, before becoming Loughborough Foxes in 2002.

After playing in local leagues for much of the first 15 years of their history, Loughborough were promoted to the FA Women's Premier League Northern Division (the 3rd tier of women's football) for the first time in 2015 from the Midlands Division One but would suffer relegation back to the 4th tier after just one season. The Foxes returned to the now renamed FA Women's National League in 2018 having secured promotion and the Midlands Division One title with a record of 21 wins and 1 draw from 22 games.

In January 2019, Loughborough Foxes player and junior team coach Molly Webb died aged 25, with Director of Football Steve Wilkinson describing her as "a joy to spend time with; she was vibrant, enthusiastic, a motivator and someone you want in your team whatever the situation.". The Foxes would end their first season back at the third tier of women's football in 7th place in the 2018–19 FA Women's National League Southern Division before being realigned to the Northern Division for the following season.

In June 2021, the club merged with the Loughborough University performance team to become Loughborough Lightning F.C.

== Players ==
=== Current squad ===
As of 2 May 2025

Note: Flags indicate national team as defined under FIFA eligibility rules; some limited exceptions apply. Players may hold more than one non-FIFA nationality.

No.	Pos.	Nation	Player
1	GK	ENG	Alicia Grimmond
3	DF	ENG	Hazel Cotton
4	MF	ENG	Sarah Woodbyrne (captain)
5	DF	ENG	Hannah Plumb
6	DF	ENG	Hannah Langford
7	FW	ENG	Ferne Powell
8	MF	ENG	Poppy Wright
9	FW	SCO	Jade Arber
10	MF	ENG	Jess Collyer
11	FW	ENG	Lauren Purchase
12	DF	ENG	Emily Jacobs
13	GK	ENG	Teresa Murphy
13	GK	ENG	Ash Naismith
15	FW	ENG	Lydia Tilbury-Henry

No.	Pos.	Nation	Player
17	DF	ENG	Zofia Szczech
19	FW	ENG	Zyn Delglyn
21	FW	ENG	Ella-Mai Coutts
23	DF	WAL	Evie Williams
24	MF	ENG	Kenzy Collingbourne
25	FW	ENG	Ella Jarowicki (dual registration with Leicester City)
26	DF	ENG	Mia Filipiak
30	MF	WAL	Morgan Rodgers
31	MF	WAL	Claudia Jones
33	MF	ENG	Amelie Johnson
35	MF	ENG	Alice Higginbottom
37	FW	ENG	Ruby Freer

== Recent seasons ==
Year	League	Lvl	Pld	W	D	L	GF	GA	GD	Pts	Position	FA Women's Cup		League Cup	
Year	League	Lvl	Pld	W	D	L	GF	GA	GD	Pts	Position	Res	Rec	Res	Rec
2006–07	Leicestershire Women's Senior League	7	12	9	0	3	51	17	+34	27	2nd of 7 Promoted	PR	0-0-1	1R	0-0-1
2007–08	East Midlands Regional Women's Football League; Division One South	6	16	8	7	1	50	23	+27	31	2nd of 9 Promoted	1Q	0-0-1	1R	0-0-1
2008–09	East Midlands Regional Women's Football League; Premier Division	5	20	14	4	2	62	21	+41	46	1st of 11; Promoted	1Q	0-0-1	QF	2-0-1
2009–10	Midland Combination Women's Football League	4	22	2	3	17	23	78	-55	9	12th of 12; Relegated	2R	1-0-1		
2010–11	East Midlands Regional Women's Football League; Premier Division	5	20	16	2	2	81	23	+58	50	1st of 11; Promoted	3Q	1-0-1		
2011–12	Midland Combination Women's Football League	4	20	8	2	10	35	39	-4	26	6th of 11	2R	2-0-1	QF	1-0-1
2012–13	Midland Combination Women's Football League	4	20	6	1	13	32	46	-14	19	9th of 11	2R	2-0-1	QF	1-0-1
2013–14	Midland Combination Women's Football League	4	20	8	2	10	48	63	-15	25	7th of 11; Transferred	1R	1-0-1	1R	0-0-1
2014–15	FA Women's Premier League; Midlands Division One	4	22	16	4	2	69	26	+43	52	1st of 12; Promoted	1R	1-0-1	1R	0-0-1
2015–16	FA Women's Premier League; Northern Division	3	22	3	2	17	26	58	-32	11	12th of 12; Relegated	4R	2-0-1	QF	2-0-1
2016–17	FA Women's Premier League; Midlands Division One	4	22	18	0	4	111	31	+80	54	2nd of 12	3QR	0-0-1	3R	3-0-1
2017–18	FA Women's Premier League; Midlands Division One	4	22	21	1	0	91	9	+82	64	1st of 12; Promoted	2R	2-0-1	2R	2-0-1
2018–19	FA Women's National League; Southern Division	3	22	10	4	8	48	32	+16	34	7th of 12; Transferred	4R	2-0-1	SF	5-0-1
2019–20	FA Women's National League; Northern Division	3									Season abandoned	3R	1-0-1	1R	0-0-1
2020–21	FA Women's National League; Northern Division	3									Season abandoned	2R	0-0-1	Not held	0-0-0
2021–22	FA Women's National League; Northern Division	3	24	6	5	13	35	63	-28	23	10th of 13	3R	2-0-1	2R	3-0-1
2022–23	FA Women's National League; Northern Division	3	22	0	3	19	10	59	-49	3	12th of 12; Relegated	2R	1-0-1	1R	1-0-1
2023–24	FA Women's National League; Division One Midlands	4	22	16	5	1	59	21	+38	53	2nd of 12	2R	2-0-1	PR	1-0-1
2024–25	FA Women's National League; Division One Midlands	4	22	19	3	0	85	10	+75	60	1st of 12; Promoted	2R	2-0-1	DR	0-0-1

== Records ==
- Best League performance: 7th FA Women's National League South (third level), 2018–19
- Best FA Women's Cup performance: Fourth Round, 2015–16 & 2018–19
