= Steel City Wanderers L.F.C. =

Steel City Wanderers
- Full name: Steel City Wanderers Ladies Football Club
- Founded: 1993 (as Loxley Girls)
- Ground: SGP Thorncliffe, High Green, Sheffield
- Chairman: Andy Auty
- League: Folded
- 2018–19: FA Women's National League Division One Midlands, 11th of 11 (relegated)

Steel City Wanderers Ladies Football Club is an English women's football club based in Sheffield, South Yorkshire. The club's senior team folded in July 2019 although it still runs several junior teams in the Sheffield & Hallamshire Women & Girls League.

== History ==
The club was formed in 1993 as Loxley Girls, changing to Steel City Wanderers two years later. The club has just recently moved from Hillsborough, Sheffield and is now based at SGP Thorncliffe, High Green, Sheffield.

The club has played in the Women's FA Cup on several occasions.
