= Guiseley A.F.C. Vixens =

Former women's football team from West Yorkshire, England

- Full name: Guiseley Association Football Club Vixens
- Nickname(s): Vixens
- Founded: 1993
- Dissolved: 2019
- Ground: Nethermoor Park, Guiseley
Home colours

Guiseley Association Football Club Vixens was a women's football club. They were founded in 1993 by Martin Cockerill as Meanwood Vixens, before becoming Leeds City Vixens and later Guiseley Vixens.

== History ==
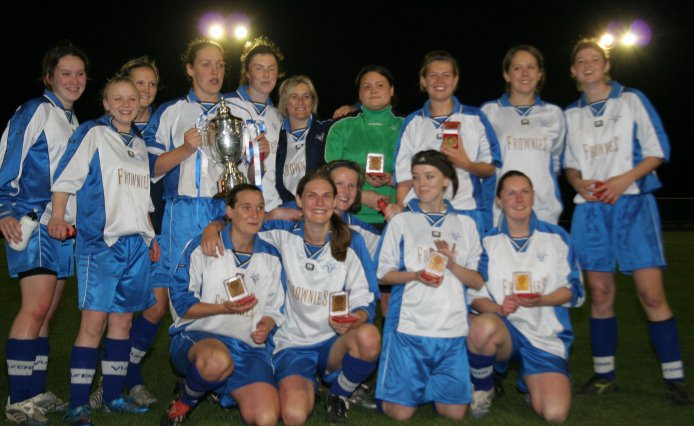
The Vixens winning the County Cup, 2007

The club was established in 1993 by Martin Cockerill and his children. At first it was called Meanwood Vixens but it grew into what is now known as Leeds City Vixens. Immediately the team made a name for itself and grew as part of the Sheffield and District Girl's League, winning the u12's, u14's and u16's . Leeds City Vixens open age played in the Yorkshire & Humberside League. In the season 1999–2000 they finished 2nd with 51 points. In 2000–01 they got 41 points and finished 5th. In 2001–02 they finished 10th with 16 points. In 2002–03 they finished 5th with 27 points and got promoted to the next tier. They started playing in the Northern Combination League for the 2003–04 season. A bad finish left them 10th at the end of the season and they were relegated back down. At the end of the 2004–05 season, they finished top of the Yorkshire & Humberside League which brought them back up to the Northern Combination, where they remain. In the 2005–06 season they finished 2nd. In the 2006–07 season they finished 2nd and came close to promotion. Over the course of the season they won 15 games, drew 4 games, and lost 2 games. The 2007–08 season saw a change in venue for the team. They now play at the same ground as Yorkshire Amateur A.F.C. and finally won promotion in 2008–09, finishing as champions of the Northern Combination Women's Football League.

Guiseley merged with Leeds City Vixens in 2014–15 to become Guiseley Vixens and under the management of John Shirt they went on to win the Women's Premier League Division One (North) The following season with many players departing and under new management Guiseley struggled to cope in the Premier League and were relegated on the last game of the season drawing 2–2 with Newcastle United when needing to win for survival

In 2017 a new management team took over with Glen Preston (formerly in charge of Huddersfield Town) and Kyle O'Reilly (Former Huddersfield Town Development Manager) spearheading the charge. They went on to win the Premier League One at the first time of asking and by a record margin (16 points) losing only one game all season.

In 2018 Guiseley got off to the worst start imaginable at the half way stage of the season they had not won one game, they were sitting bottom of the Premier League 11 points from safety. But in the second half of the season the Vixens rallied together and produced a great escape to survive on the last day of the season beating Huddersfield 2–1. To cap off this achievement they also ended Bradford City's five-year reign of the County Cup beating them 3–1 at Fleet Lane to mark off a very successful season.

The club was liquidated at the end of the 2018–19 season.

== Other teams ==
The club had several younger ages on the team including U16sA, U16sB, U15s, U13s, U11s, U10s, U9s. They also had a reserve team that played in the Northern Premier League 2 Reserve Division.

== Honours ==
- Women's Premier League Winners 2014
- Women's Premier League Winners 2017
- West Riding County Cup Winners 2018
- Twice Reebok's English champions
- 4 times PUMA's World Champions
- Twice Snicker's Champions of England
- Women's Yorkshire County Cup
- Coca-Cola's North East England champions

== Mascot ==
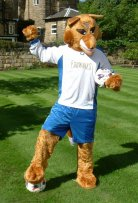
Vicky The Vixen

The official Leeds City Vixens mascot was Vicky the Vixen.
