= Swindon Town W.F.C. =

Swindon Town Women
- Founded: 1993; 33 years ago
- Ground: County Ground, Swindon
- Manager: Richard Wood
- League: FA Women's National League Division One South West
- 2024–25: FA Women's National League Division One South West, 3rd of 12
- Website: https://www.swindontownfc.co.uk/women
Home colours	Away colours

Swindon Town Women Football Club are a women's association football club affiliated to Swindon Town F.C. They are members of the FA Women's National League Division One South West and play their home games at the Nigel Eady County Ground.

== History ==
They were founded in 1993, after several players broke away from the established Swindon Spitfires WFC (formed in 1967) and began playing in Division Four of the South West Regional Women's Football League the same year. They won the league, and promotion, in their first season, and went on to win two more league titles in the next two seasons. After a couple of seasons playing in Division One, they joined the newly formed South West Combination in 1998.

Swindon Town Ladies were formed in 1993 and joined the Southern Region Women's Football League. Playing in Division Four they played their first competitive fixture on Sunday 5 September away to Southampton Reserves, winning by four goals to one. The first home league match was played on Sunday 10 October against Reading Royals. The game, played at Wootton Bassett, was “Kicked – Off” by Doreen Dart the Mayor of Thamesdown (as it was then) with the Town winning by eight goals to two. Swindon finished their first season as Division Four League Champions and also won the Southern Region 5-a-Side Tournament.

In the next two seasons Swindon Town Ladies were Champions of Divisions Three and Two respectively.

In their first season in Division One they finished in mid-table and supplied eight players to the newly formed Wiltshire County Ladies team that won the South West Counties Championship.

In the 1996 / 1997 Season the Town were Runner's up in the Southern Region Division One and were beaten finalists in the League Cup. Again Town players formed the nucleolus of the County Women's team that finished second in the Counties Championship.

The 1998 / 1999 Season saw Swindon Town Ladies elected to be founder members of the F.A. South West Combination League. They finished the inaugural season in Third place and won the “Ambassador” South West Combination League Cup, beating Cheltenham Four – Nil in the Final. The Town also set a record when the starting line – up of the County Women's Team were all from the same club.

In the 1999 / 2000 Season the Town again finished third in the League and retained the League Cup by beating League Champions Newport One – Nil in the Final.

The 2000 / 2001 Season saw the Town finish third once again and win the League Cup for the third consecutive season, beating Cheltenham in the Final by Four goals to two.

(The 2000 / 01 Ambassador League Cup Champions )

A Reserve team was also formed and they played in the Southern Region League. They finished as Champions but were denied promotion to the Southern Premier League due to geographical restructuring of the league set-up went on to play in the Wiltshire County League.

In 2001 / 2002 the Town finished fourth in the league, unfortunately they were unable to maintain their hold on the League Cup losing to Cardiff City in the semi – final.

At the start of the 2002 / 2003 Season Swindon Town Ladies merged with Coleview Girls and ran teams at Under 10, 12 and 14 level as well as the two senior teams.

The Senior First Team finished fifth in the League, but the League Cup Competition was not played due to fixture congestion caused by adverse weather conditions.

The Senior Reserve Team progressed to the South West Regional League in 2006 following a further restructuring of the Women's Pyramid of football. With the First Team continuing its membership of the South West Combination League.

In the 2006 – 2007 season saw the club moved towards single aged banding and ran teams from under 8; 9; 10; 11; 12; 13; 14; and since the age requirement to play Senior football has been raised from 14 to 16, under 15 and 16 teams were also added, giving the total number of players within the club in excess of 140 players.

Also in 2006 Swindon Town Ladies were awarded the F.A. Charter Standard. This was in recognition of meeting the Football Association's requirements for Qualified Coaches, First Aiders etc. and everyone involved in running the club being C.R.B. checked. The club still holds this Charter Standard.

During the 2006 – 2007 season Town were top of the league at the turn of the year halfway through the season, but could not sustain a title challenge and finally finished fourth, also losing out to on penalties to Chesham Utd in the Semi final of the league cup.

Inconsistency during the 2007 – 2008 season saw a seventh-place finish in the league, although the highlight to the season was winning through to the fourth round of the Woman's FA cup and drawn at home to the competitions most successful team Doncaster Belles, were the game was played at the County Ground.

The reserves did find success this season winning the South West Regional League, Division 1 North, but due to the structure of the FA Woman's league they are unable to be promoted to a higher division.

With many changes to the playing members of the first team, the 2008 – 2009 season became a very difficult one, a young team eventually finished 8th in the league, with no league cup due to fixture congestion.

As we move into the 2009 – 2010 season Swindon Town Ladies FC are the only surviving team in the South West Combination League since its start over 11 years ago

With the structure of women's football in England being re-organised due to the introduction of FA WSL 2 in 2014, Swindon Town were moved into the new South West Division One of the FA Women's Premier League for the 2014–15 season. They almost won the division at their first attempt, but a three-point deduction for fielding an ineligible player cost them the title, leaving them in third place at the end of the season, just one point off the top of the table.

The club currently has three teams; its First Team currently compete in the FA Women's National League South West, while it continues to have a Development Team who compete in the South West Regional Women's Football League. Its First Team and Development Team compete at the fourth and sixth Tier, respectively. of the Women's Football Pyramid (WFP). It also recently established an Under-16's team for the 2021/22 season, appointing Adam Wood as manager

== Club staff ==
Position	Name
Secretary	Tim Hall
Treasurer	Stephen Butcher
Director of Football	Vacant
Commercial & Development	Vacant
Club Liaison Officer	Roger Reeves MBE
Player Care	Laura Morgan
Head of Media	Vacant
Social Media Manager	Vacant
Club Photographer	Calum Ross

== Coaching staff ==
Position	Name
First Team Manager	Richard Wood
First Team Assistant	Vacant
First Team Coach	Vacant
First Team Goalkeeping Coach	David Tomlinson
Performance Analyst	Samir Jolsen-Smail
Development Team Manager	Vacant
Development Team Coach	Gary Clarke
Club Sports Therapist	Vacant
Head of Performance	Vacant
Lead S&C Coach	Vacant
Sports Rehabilitation Therapist Intern	Vacant
S&C Intern	Vacant
Sports Science Intern	Vacant
Under-18s Manager	Chiarna Deller
Under-18s Coach	Ellie Burgess
Under-18s Coach	Jordan Hendon
Club Kitman	Vacant

== Honours ==
League

- FA Women's National League
  - Division 1 title: 2016
- Southern Regional Women's League Div 4
  - Winners: 1994
- Southern Regional Women's League Div 3
  - Winners: 1995
- Southern Regional Women's League Div 2
  - Winners: 1996
- Southern Regional Women's League Div 1
  - Runners up: 1997

Cups

- Women's FA Cup
  - Best Finish: 3rd Round (14/15)
- Wiltshire County FA Women's Cup
  - Winners: 2011, 2012, 2013, 2014, 2015, 2018, 2022
- Southern Regional Women's League Cup
  - 5-a-side winners: 1994
  - Winners: 1999
- South West Combination League Cup
  - Winners: 1999, 2000, 2001
  - Runners up: 2012, 2013

== Club managers ==
Apr 23 - Present: Mike Cook

June 22 - April 23 : James Lally

Aug 2019 – June 22: Jamie Lloyd-Davies

June 2018 – July 2019: Dan Jones

July 2017 – June 2018: Leonie Wade

June 2014 – May 2017: Steve Robertson

June 2013 – June 2014: Jason Brizell

??? – May 2013: Glyn Evans

1993 –????: Kerri Garwood
