= Milton Keynes Dons F.C. Women =

English women's association football club based in Milton Keynes, England

Milton Keynes Dons Women
- Full name: Milton Keynes Dons Football Club Women
- Nickname: The Dons
- Short name: MK Dons Women
- Founded: 2009
- Ground: Stadium MK
- Capacity: 30,500
- Chairman: Fahad Al Ghamin
- Manager: Fadi Mazloum
- League: FA Women's National League; Division One South East
- 2025–26: FA Women's National League Division One South East, 8th of 12
- Website: mkdons.com/women
| Home colours | Away colours | Third colours |

Milton Keynes Dons Women, usually abbreviated to MK Dons Women, are a semi-professional women's association football club in Milton Keynes, Buckinghamshire, England. Founded in 2009, the club is affiliated with Milton Keynes Dons. They are currently members of the fourth tier FA Women's National League Division One South East.

Previously known as Milton Keynes Dons Ladies, the club's current name took effect ahead of the 2019–20 season.

In May 2025, Milton Keynes Dons announced the women's team would be fully integrated into the club's operations for the first time ahead of the 2025–26 season, further announcing a full-time manager would also be appointed for the first time in the team's history.

== Stadium ==
Milton Keynes Dons F.C. Women lining up against Watford at Stadium MK in September 2020

Until 2018, the club played their home games at Willen Road Sports Ground in Newport Pagnell, which is also the home of men's amateur association football club Newport Pagnell Town.

The team share Stadium MK as their home stadium with their male counterparts, Milton Keynes Dons - one of the first clubs in the country to share a stadium between both men's and women's teams of the same club.

== Players ==
=== First team squad ===
As of 9 July 2026

Note: Flags indicate national team as defined under FIFA eligibility rules; some limited exceptions apply. Players may hold more than one non-FIFA nationality.

| No. | Pos. | Nation | Player |
|---|---|---|---|
| 2 | DF | ENG | Bianca Luttman |
| 3 | DF | ENG | Alex O'Neill |
| 5 | MF | ZIM | Amanda Chimbima |
| 6 | DF | ENG | Paige Ridley |
| 7 | MF | ITA | Giusy Carnevale |
| 8 | DF | NGR | Favour Omenazu (captain) |
| 9 | FW | BRB | Cheyanna Norman |
| 10 | MF | ENG | Molly Lemon |
| 11 | FW | ENG | Annaliza Jacovides |
| 14 | MF | ENG | Sophie Birkett |
| 15 | DF | ENG | Rosie McDonnell |

| No. | Pos. | Nation | Player |
|---|---|---|---|
| 16 | MF | ENG | Amelie Sarll |
| 18 | FW | ENG | Mollie Knox |
| 19 | MF | ENG | Ruby Bishop-Jones |
| 25 | DF | ENG | Ronni Harrison |
| 26 | DF | NGR | Ugomma Ekendu-Obi |
| 29 | MF | RSA | Afrika de Villiers |
| 32 | DF | ALB | Katie Rukaj |
| 33 | MF | ENG | Mia Day |
| 39 | GK | ENG | Amber Taylor |
| — | MF | ENG | Amber Leighton |

== Honours ==
=== League ===
- FA WPL South East Division One

Winners: 2017–18

=== Cup ===
- Berks & Bucks Senior Women's Cup

Winners: 2013–14, 2014–15, 2015–16, 2017–18 2018–19, 2022–23
Runners-up: 2016–17
