= Chichester City L.F.C. =

Association football club in England

Coordinates: 50°50′33.040″N 0°46′31.480″W

Chichester City Ladies
- Full name: Chichester City Ladies and Girls Football Club
- Nickname(s): Lillywhites, Chi Ladies
- Short name: Chichester City L.F.C.
- Founded: 2012
- Ground: Oaklands Park, Chichester
- Capacity: 2,000
- League: FA Women's National League South
Home colours	Away colours

Chichester City Ladies and Girls Football Club, usually abbreviated to just Chichester City Ladies or Chichester City L.F.C., is a women's football club based in Chichester, West Sussex, England. Affiliated with Chichester City F.C., they are currently members of the FA Women's National League South and play at Oaklands Park.

== History ==
The men's club was established in 2000 as a merger of Chichester City and Portfield, and was originally named Chichester City United. In 2015 the club was renamed Chichester City. In 2012 a ladies side was formed.

== Ground ==
The club is one of the few clubs to share the stadium with their male counterparts, Oaklands Park. In 2008 after a 100-seat stand was installed and a new clubhouse and changing rooms were completed in 2010, with hard-standing installed on all four sides of the pitch.

== Feeder teams ==
The club operates a Development Squad side that plays as of 2018-19 season plays in the FAWNL Reserves League and several youth teams under the structures of Chichester City Ladies Youth.

== See also ==
- Chichester City F.C.
