= Wem Town Ladies F.C. =

English women's football club

Wem Town Ladies
- Full name: Wem Town Ladies Football Club
- Nickname: Town
- Short name: Wem
- Founded: 2002; 24 years ago
- Ground: Butler Sports Centre, Wem
- Chairman: Mary Harris
- Manager: David Healey
- League: West Midlands Regional Women's Football League
- 2022–23: FA Women's National League Division One Midlands, 11th of 12 (relegated)
- Website: https://www.tnsfc.co.uk/

Wem Town Ladies Football Club is a women's semi-professional association football club from Wem, and affiliated to the men's team of the same name. They play in the Butler Sports Center. The club are a part of The New Saints F.C. foundation and share close links with the other sections of the club. Until 2020, they were known as The New Saints of Oswestry Town & Llansantffraid Ladies Football Club due to their partnership with the Cymru Premier side.

== History ==
The club was originally formed in 2002 as a women's section for The New Saints F.C., who wished to diversify their footballing profile. Home games have always been held at the same venue as the men's side. Following the side's success and development a youth set up was formed for the beginning of the 2011–12 season. The club has enjoyed unparalleled success in Shropshire, winning the last 11 Shropshire Women's Challenge Cups as well as achieving their current league standing in the FA Women's National League - Midlands Division One.

For the 2013–14 season the club entered the West Midlands Regional Women's Football League - Premier Division with the club finishing 4th in the league and winning their 7th Shropshire Women's Challenge Cup. The following season (2014–15) saw a second-placed finish, another Shropshire Women's Challenge Cup win and saw Emily Ridge finish the season as the league's top goalscorer with 24 goals in 18 league games. In their third season in the league, TNS finished the season as champions and claimed promotion to the FA Women's National League - Midlands Division One; the season also saw another Shropshire Women's Challenge Cup and Ridge again claimed the league's golden boot with 38 goals in 18 games.

TNS's first season in the FA Women's National League saw a 6th-placed finish, thanks to impressive performances from Emily Ridge (24 goals in 18 games) and new signing Charlotte Canlett who had joined the club from Everton L.F.C. in the summer, the club also added to their Shropshire Women's Challenge Cup haul. The 2017–18 season saw TNS improve on their position securing a 5th-placed finish and another Shropshire Women's Challenge Cup win (their 11th in a row), matched with a spectacular performance in the Women's FA Cup where they reached the 4th round proper for the first time in the club's history.

For the 2018–19 season, TNS hired former assistant manager Lawrence Wilson as the club's new manager. Following a number of player and staff retirements, the club went on a stage of rebuilding, bringing in a large number of young players. Wilson's first game was a 4–1 away loss to Nettleham FC, Nettleham, Lincolnshire. Wilson's first win was a home match at Park Hall (football ground) against Solihull Moors Ladies which finished 3–0, with goals from Emily Ridge, Laura Morris and a Solihull own goal. Saints ended the 2018-19 campaign in eighth place, beating Burton Albion LFC 9–1. Following that, Wilson's side secured an eleventh Shropshire Cup with a 9–1 victory and a Ridge hat trick over Shifnal Town.

For the beginning of the 2019–20 season, Saints brought in a number of new players, including Helen Evans from Aberystwyth Town F.C. and Jess Jennings from Wolverhampton Wanderers W.F.C. The club also entered a Development team into the FAWNL Reserve League, where the team were entered into the Reserve Midland Division 2 and managed by former Burton Albion LFC coach Dave Warner. Saints started the season with a 5–1 loss to Birmingham & West Midlands LFC, which saw Saints fall towards the bottom of the league. However a quick upturn in form saw Saints climb to 2nd in the league after a number of wins over league rivals. Saints reached the 1st round proper of the Women's FA Cup, beating Long Eaton United F.C. and Peterborough United F.C. before being knocked out at home to Chorley F.C.

In 2020, the women's section of TNS split from the men's club. This was due to TNS Ladies accusing TNS of not viewing women's football as a priority and for retaining their Women's FA Cup earnings for use on the whole club. They announced they would be renamed as Wem Town to thank Wem for supporting them independently when TNS announced they would fold the ladies club.

== Current squad ==
As of 24 November 2022

Note: Flags indicate national team as defined under FIFA eligibility rules; some limited exceptions apply. Players may hold more than one non-FIFA nationality.

No.	Pos.	Nation	Player
1	GK	ENG	Sarah Parkes
2	DF	ENG	Lauren Brown
3	DF	ENG	Lucy Brown
4	DF	WAL	Phoebe Davies (Captain)
5	DF	ENG	Caitlyn Smith
6	MF	WAL	Lia Lewis
7	FW	ENG	Laura Morris
8	DF	WAL	Taylor Davis
9	FW	ENG	Zoe Griffiths

No.	Pos.	Nation	Player
10	MF	ENG	Katie Doster
11	FW	WAL	Laura Pennington
12	MF	ENG	Kim Bebbington
14	DF	ENG	Mia Evans
16	DF	ENG	Yasmin Evans
17	MF	WAL	Helen Evans
18	FW	ENG	Charlotte Turner
19	FW	ENG	Jess Jennings
22	DF	ENG	Erin Taylor

== Coaching staff ==
Position	Name		
Manager	(England) David Healey		
Assistant Manager	(England)		
First Team Coach	(England)		
Goalkeeping Coach	(England)	Physiotherapist	Vacant

== League history ==
Season	League	Final position
2008–09	Midland Women's Combination League	8th
2009–10	Midland Women's Combination League	7th
2010–11	Midland Women's Combination League	11th
2011–12	Midland Women's Combination League	11th - Transferred
2012–13	West Midlands Regional Women's Football League - Premier Division	5th
2013–14	West Midlands Regional Women's Football League - Premier Division	4th
2014–15	West Midlands Regional Women's Football League - Premier Division	2nd
2015–16	West Midlands Regional Women's Football League - Premier Division	1st – Champions
2016–17	FA Women's National League - Midlands Division 1	6th
2017–18	FA Women's National League - Midlands Division 1	5th
2018–19	FA Women's National League - Midlands Division 1	8th

== Honours ==
League

West Midlands Regional Women's Football League:

- Champions (1): 2015–16

Cup

The Tom Farmer Women's Cup (Shropshire FA Women's Challenge Cup):

- Champions (11): 2007–08, 2009–10, 2010–11, 2011–12, 2012–13, 2013–14, 2014–15, 2015–16, 2016–17, 2017–18, 2018–19

== Records ==
- Best Women's FA Cup performance: Fourth round, 2017–18
- Record League Win: 14 - 0 v Steel City Wanderers LFC on 24 March 2019
- Record Cup Win: 18 - 0 v Bishops Caste Town LFC on 22 January 2020
- Fastest Goal: Emily Ridge (11 Seconds) against Bedworth United LFC in January, 2019
