= St Nicholas L.F.C. =

- Full name: St Nicholas F.C. Ladies
- Nickname(s): St Nick's
- Founded: 2008
- Dissolved: 2019
- Ground: Lodge Road, Yate
- Capacity: 2,000
- Coordinates: 51°32′57.59″N 2°26′19.32″W
- Chairman: Steve Venn
- Manager: John Seymour
- 2018–19: FA Women's National League Division One South West (withdrew)
- Website: http://www.stnicksfc.co.uk/
Home colours	Away colours

St Nicholas Football Club Ladies were a women's association football team based in South Gloucestershire, England. The first team played in the FA Women's National League until folding in the summer of 2018. The reserves continued to play in the Gloucestershire County League for the 2018–19 season but moved to a new base in Pucklechurch in 2019 and re-branded as Pucklechurch Sports.

The club's senior women's team was founded in 2008. Until then they had girls' teams up to under-18 level, the addition of the women's team enabled the girls to continue playing at the club beyond that age. Overall, St Nicholas Football club ran 21 teams in boys', girls', men's and women's football.

== Team colours ==
The home kit consisted of black and green shirts and socks, with black shorts, while their away kit was yellow with black trim. Both were manufactured by Zapkam.
