= Atlético London =

Football Club based in Walthamstow North East London

- Full name: Atlético London
- Founded: 2004
- Ground: The techsoc.com Stadium, Barkingside
- Manager: Sinead Hogan
- League: Eastern Region Women's Football League Premier Division
- 2024–25: FA Women's National League Division One South East, 12th of 12 (relegated)

Atlético London, formerly London Seaward Football Club (2021–2025) and Leyton Orient Women Football Club (2015–2021), is a women's football team based in Barkingside in East London, England. The team compete in the Eastern Region Premier Division, and play home games at The techsoc.com Stadium in Barkingside.

== History ==
The club was founded in 2004 as KIKK United by Andrea Berg and Karin Revelj. The team used Mile End Stadium as its home ground.

In 2015 the club was given permission by Leyton Orient FC to use the name Leyton Orient W.F.C. The club would compete in the Greater London Women's Football League, in division 1 (North) during this time. Despite the name change the club would continue to be run separately from the men's side. In 2017 the club was promoted to the FA Women's Premier League South East Division One. In March 2021 Leyton Orient announced that they were planning to form their own women's side and that the existing team would no longer be able to use the name Leyton Orient WFC.

As a result of the loss of their ability to compete as Leyton Orient W.F.C. the club was left in search of a new identity, with the club settling on the name London Seaward as a reference to the historic connection of London with the sea. At the same time, the club began playing its home matches at Wadham Lodge, Walthamstow.

In May 2023, London Seaward announced that from the 2023-24 season the club would play home matches at The techsoc.com Stadium, the ground of Redbridge F.C.

In May 2025, London Seaward confirmed their name change to Atlético London.
