= Nethermoor Park =

Stadium in Guiseley, England

Coordinates: 53°52′38″N 1°43′10″W

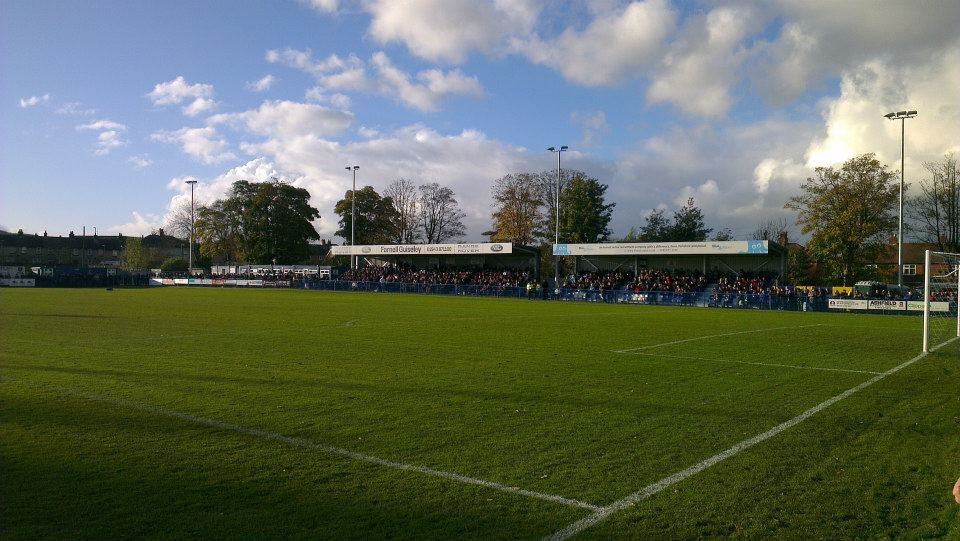
- Nethermoor Park
- Interactive map of Nethermoor Park
- Location: Guiseley, England
- Capacity: 4,000
- Record attendance: 3,366

Construction
- Opened: 1909

Tenant
- Guiseley A.F.C. (1909–)

Nethermoor Park is a football stadium in Guiseley, West Yorkshire and the home ground of Guiseley A.F.C. Opened in 1909, the stadium has a capacity of 4,000. Following the club's promotion to the National division of the National League in 2015, plans were submitted to ensure the ground passed the ground grading requirements of a 4,000 capacity with 500 seats; the expansion would involve creating new terraces on three sides of the ground and covering all four sides. The extension was completed before the 30 March 2016 deadline.

The record attendance at the ground is 3,366 for a friendly match against Leeds United on 26 July 2018.
