= Southern Region Women's Football League =

- Founded: 1990
- Country: England
- Divisions: 3
- Number of clubs: 24
- Level on pyramid: 5 & 6
- Feeder to: FA Women's National League Division 1 South West

The Southern Region Women's Football League is at the fifth and sixth levels of the English women's football pyramid, with the seven other Regional Leagues – Eastern, London & SE, South West, West Midlands, East Midlands, North East and North West.

The Southern Region Women's Football League promotes teams directly into the FA Women's National League Division 1 South West, and lies above the Hampshire Women's League and Thames Valley Women's Football League in the pyramid. The pyramid structure was founded in 1998.

Below the Premier Division, the two Division Ones are split geographically with Division One East and Division One West.

The 2019/20 season was expunged due to the 2020 COVID-19 pandemic.

== 2026-27 season tables ==
=== Premier Division ===
Pos	Team	Pld	W	D	L	GF	GA	GD	Pts	Qualification
1	AFC Portchester	7	6	1	0	29	3	+26	19	Promotion
2	Farnham Town	6	5	1	0	29	7	+22	16	
3	Oxford City	7	5	1	1	19	3	+16	16	
4	Reading	8	4	3	1	37	19	+18	15	
5	Winchester City Flyers	7	4	2	1	24	12	+12	14	
6	Southampton	9	4	2	3	19	13	+6	14	
7	Denham United	7	3	1	3	22	23	−1	10	
8	Sholing	8	3	1	4	22	31	−9	10	
9	Beaconsfield Town	9	1	1	7	8	41	−33	4	
10	Fleet Town	6	1	0	5	6	23	−17	3	
11	Chesham United	7	1	0	6	10	33	−23	3	Relegation
12	Woodley United	7	0	1	6	6	23	−17	1	Relegation

Updated to match(es) played on 15 November 2026. Source: The Football Association
Rules for classification: 1) Points; 2) Goal difference; 3) Number of goals scored

=== Division One North ===
Pos	Team	Pld	W	D	L	GF	GA	GD	Pts	Qualification
1	Finchampstead	7	4	2	1	26	12	+14	14	Promotion
2	Barton United	7	3	3	1	18	10	+8	12	
3	Penn & Tylers Green	5	3	1	1	19	8	+11	10	
4	Chesham United Development	7	3	1	3	12	15	−3	10	
5	Farnborough	6	2	2	2	15	15	0	8	
6	Slough Town	6	2	2	2	9	15	−6	8	
7	Abingdon United Development	5	2	1	2	8	18	−10	7	
8	Badshot Lea	4	2	0	2	10	7	+3	6	
9	Kidlington	4	1	1	2	10	12	−2	4	
10	Oxford City Development	7	0	1	6	8	23	−15	1	

Updated to match(es) played on 18 October 2026. Source: The Football Association
Rules for classification: 1) Points; 2) Goal difference; 3) Number of goals scored

=== Division One South ===
Pos	Team	Pld	W	D	L	GF	GA	GD	Pts	Qualification
1	Havant & Waterlooville	4	4	0	0	15	4	+11	12	Promotion
2	Bognor Regis Town	3	3	0	0	11	2	+9	9	
3	AFC Portchester Reserves	6	2	1	3	10	9	+1	7	
4	Wimborne Town	4	2	0	2	15	9	+6	6	
5	AFC Stoneham	3	2	0	1	6	2	+4	6	
6	Millbrook	3	2	0	1	7	5	+2	6	
7	Andover New Street	3	2	0	1	6	5	+1	6	
8	AFC Varsity	3	1	2	0	5	4	+1	5	
9	Bournemouth Sports Reserves	5	1	1	3	5	8	−3	4	
10	Guernsey	6	1	1	4	14	18	−4	4	
11	Whitchurch United	4	0	2	2	6	14	−8	2	Relegation
12	Bursledon	4	0	1	3	6	26	−20	1	Relegation

Updated to match(es) played on 18 October 2026. Source: The Football Association
Rules for classification: 1) Points; 2) Goal difference; 3) Number of goals scored

== Teams ==
=== Premier Division ===
Club	Home ground	Capacity
AFC Portchester	The Onsite Group Stadium	1,000
Beaconsfield Town FC	Holloways Park	3,500
Chesham United FC	The Meadow, Amy Lane	2,000
Denham United Ladies FC	The Den, Oxford Road	400
Farnham Town FC	The Memorial Ground, Mead Lane	2,200
Fleet Town FC	Easy as HGV Stadium, Calthorpe Park	2,000
Oxford City Women's & Girls FC	MGroup Stadium Court Place Farm	3,100
Reading	Madejski Stadium	24,161
Sholing Women FC	The Mortgage Decisions Stadium	2,500
Southampton	Test Park Sports Ground	1,260
Winchester City Flyers Women FC	Charters Community Stadium	4,500
Woodley United FC	UoR Bulmershe Pavilion	1,000

Location of the SRWFL Premier Division clubs for the 2025–26 season

=== Division One North ===
Club	Home ground	Capacity
Abingdon United Development	The Northcourt	2,000
Badshot Lea FC	Operatix Community Ground	1,200
Barton United FC	Barton Pavilion	100
Chesham United Development	Chiltern Hills Academy	100
Farnborough FC	BR Saunders Community Stadium	6,500
Finchampstead FC	Finchampstead Memorial Park	1,000
Kidlington FC	Yarnton Road	1,500
Oxford City Development	MGroup Stadium	3,100
Penn & Tylers Green FC	French School Meadow	1,000
Slough Town FC	Arbour Park	2,000

=== Division One South ===
Club	Home ground	Capacity
AFC Portchester Reserves	The Onsite Group Stadium	1,000
AFC Stoneham	Stoneham Lane Football Complex	1,000
AFC Varsity	Hatches Farm Sports Ground	500
Andover New Street FC	DH Property Services Stadium	1,000
Bognor Regis Town	Nyewood Lane	4,500
Bournemouth Sports Reserves	Chapel Gate, BU Sports Complex	1,000
Bursledon FC	Woodlands Community College	100
Guernsey FC	Victoria Park	3,000
Havant & Waterlooville FC	Westleigh Park	5,300
Millbrook FC	Test Park Sports Ground / Mansel Pitch, Mansel Park	1,260 / 500
Whitchurch United FC	Longmeadow Sports Centre	1,500
Wimborne Town FC	Wyatt Homes Stadium	2,800
