= Chester Moor =

Village in County Durham, England

Coordinates: 54.839°N 1.584°W

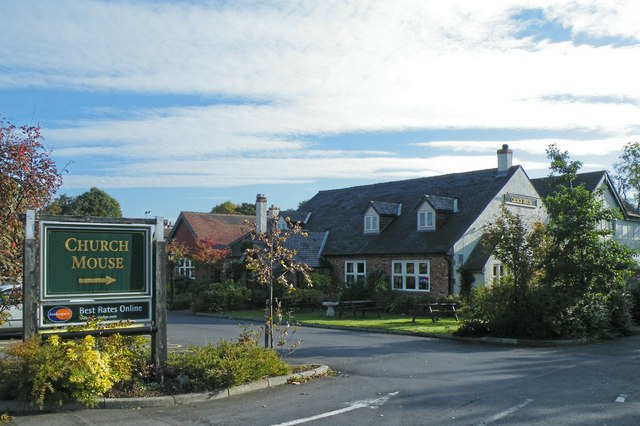
- Church Mouse, Innkeepers Lodge, Chester Moor

- Location within County Durham
- OS grid reference: NZ2649
- Unitary authority: County Durham
- Ceremonial county: County Durham
- Region: North East
- Country: England
- Sovereign state: United Kingdom
- Post town: CHESTER LE STREET
- Postcode district: DH2
- Dialling code: 0191
- UK Parliament: North Durham

Chester Moor is a village in County Durham, England. It is situated a short distance to the south of Chester-le-Street.
