= 2017–18 FA Women's Premier League Cup =

Tournament details
- Country: England
- Teams: 71

Final positions
- Champions: Blackburn Rovers
- Runners-up: Leicester City

Tournament statistics
- Matches played: 72
- Goals scored: 331 (4.6 per match)

The 2017–18 FA Women's Premier League Cup is the 27th running of the FA Women's Premier League Cup, which began in 1991. It is the major League Cup competition run by the FA Women's Premier League, and for the fourth season it is being run alongside their secondary League Cup competition, the Premier League Plate.

All 71 Premier League clubs entered at the Determining round, with the winners continuing in the competition and the losers going into the Premier League Plate tournament.

Tottenham Hotspur is the reigning champions, having defeated Charlton Athletic 4–3 on penalties the previous season, but will not be defending their title after their promotion to the FA WSL 2.

== Results ==
All results listed are published by The Football Association. Games are listed by round in chronological order, and then in alphabetical order of the home team where matches were played simultaneously.

The division each team play in is indicated in brackets after their name: (S)=Southern Division; (N)=Northern Division; (SW1)=South West Division One; (SE1)=South East Division One; (M1)=Midlands Division One; (N1)=Northern Division One.

=== Determining round ===
The competition begins with a Determining Round, which consisted of 70 teams in the FA Women's Premier League being drawn in pairs, with Plymouth Argyle being given a bye. The winners of these 35 games and Plymouth Argyle progress to the next stage of the competition, while the losers qualify for the 2017–18 FA Women's Premier League Plate.

3 September 2017	Blackburn Rovers (N)	3–0	Barnsley (N1)	Bamber Bridge
14:00 BST (UTC+01:00)	Jordon 45', 63'; McCoy 60'	Report		Stadium: Sir Tom Finney Stadium; Attendance: 86

3 September 2017	Bradford City (N)	3–3 (a.e.t.) (3–2 p)	Fylde Ladies (N)	Bradford
14:00 BST (UTC+01:00)	Elford; Olds	Report	Charlton 13'; Sarri 62', 90+5'	Stadium: Plumpton Park; Attendance: 81

3 September 2017	C & K Basildon (S)	8–0	Basingstoke Town (SW1)	Canvey Island
14:00 BST (UTC+01:00)	Addison; Blackie	Report		Stadium: The Frost Financial Stadium; Attendance: 62

3 September 2017	Cheltenham Town (SW1)	1–2	Actonians (SE1)	Cheltenham
14:00 BST (UTC+01:00)	Fensome	Report	Byrne; Murphy	Stadium: Petersfield Park; Attendance: 35

3 September 2017	Chester Le Street (N1)	3–2	Hull City (N1)	Chester Moor
14:00 BST (UTC+01:00)	Hockaday 49'; Jones 60'; Goundry-Havery 75'	Report	Tanser; Symington	Stadium: Moor Park; Attendance: 30

3 September 2017	Chichester City (S)	4–1	West Ham United (S)	Chichester
14:00 BST (UTC+01:00)	Lewry 13', 60'; Khassel 87'; Tucker 90'	Report	Burr 77'	Stadium: Oaklands Park; Attendance: 70

3 September 2017	Chorley (N1)	1–5	Leicester City (N)	Leyland
14:00 BST (UTC+01:00)	Walker 12'	Report	Domingo 18', 26'; Mitcham 32'; Axten 81'; Farrow 83'	Stadium: Jim Fowler Memorial Fields; Attendance: 66

3 September 2017	Coventry United (S)	16–1	Haringey Borough (SE1)	Coventry
14:00 BST (UTC+01:00)	Davies 7'; Hall 11', 44'; Seivwright 21', 25'; Smith 6', 58', 62', 82'; Dermody 45', 61', 65', 76'; Brook 49'; Gauntlett 69', 87'	Report	Peter	Stadium: Butts Park Arena; Attendance: 93

3 September 2017	Crystal Palace (S)	10–1	Brislington (SW1)	Kent
14:00 BST (UTC+01:00)	Whinnett 2', 21'; Paye 5', 79'; Bryan 11', 37', 52'; Sherwood 42', 71'; Bailes 47'	Report	Arkell 60'	Stadium: Hayes Lane; Attendance: 203

3 September 2017	Derby County (N)	7–0	Rotherham United (M1)	Derby
14:00 BST (UTC+01:00)	Ledgister 13'; Giampalma 15'; Tait 44'; Hewitt 53'; Bell 55', 90'; De Silva 63'	Report		Stadium: University of Derby; Attendance: 63

3 September 2017	Enfield Town (SE1)	3–2	Keynsham Town (SW1)	Enfield
14:00 BST (UTC+01:00)	Coleman	Report	Vega 41'; Cook 70'	Stadium: Queen Elizabeth II Stadium; Attendance: 23

3 September 2017	Gillingham (S)	0–1	Stevenage (SE1)	Chatham
14:00 BST (UTC+01:00)		Report	Emmings	Stadium: The CJ Doors Stadium; Attendance: 152

3 September 2017	Larkhall Athletic (SW1)	1–8	Ipswich Town (SE1)	Larkhall
14:00 BST (UTC+01:00)	German	Report	Campbell; Craddock; Henry; Small; Welton	Stadium: Plain Ham; Attendance: 20

3 September 2017	Leicester City Ladies (M1)	0–5	Bolton Wanderers (N1)	Leicester
14:00 BST (UTC+01:00)		Report	Kirkman-Ryan 22', 35'; Newhouse 51', 63'; Milner 90' (o.g.)	Stadium: Linwood Playing Fields; Attendance: 60

3 September 2017	Lewes (S)	3–1 (a.e.t.)	Southampton Saints (SW1)	Lewes
14:00 BST (UTC+01:00)	Taylor 63'; Rutherford 92'; Lane 110'	Report	Morriss-Manosalva	Stadium: The Dripping Pan; Attendance: 60

3 September 2017	Long Eaton United (M1)	1–2 (a.e.t.)	West Bromwich Albion (N)	Long Eaton
14:00 BST (UTC+01:00)	Williams 39'	Report		Stadium: Grange Park; Attendance: 65

3 September 2017	Loughborough Foxes (M1)	5–0	Sporting Khalsa (M1)	Loughborough
14:00 BST (UTC+01:00)	Young 30', 80'; Steele 55', 75'; Brackenbury 60'	Report		Stadium: Loughborough University Stadium; Attendance: 40

3 September 2017	Luton Town (SE1)	2–4	Leyton Orient (SE1)	Luton
14:00 BST (UTC+01:00)	Henman; McKay	Report	Le Marchand 37'; Douton 43'; Davies 67'; Meadowcroft 87'	Stadium: Stockwood Park Athletics Stadium; Attendance: 59

3 September 2017	Maidenhead United (SW1)	0–1 (a.e.t.)	Poole Town (SW1)	Maidenhead
14:00 BST (UTC+01:00)		Report	Anderson 110'	Stadium: York Road; Attendance: 53

3 September 2017	Middlesbrough (N)	5–0	Burton Albion (M1)	Thornaby-on-Tees
14:00 BST (UTC+01:00)	Scarr 55', 78', 85'; Havelock 59'; Kelly 75'	Report		Stadium: Teesdale Park; Attendance: 84

3 September 2017	Milton Keynes Dons (SE1)	0–1	AFC Wimbledon (SE1)	Newport Pagnell
14:00 BST (UTC+01:00)		Report	Stanley 47'	Stadium: Willen Road; Attendance: 85

3 September 2017	Morecambe (N1)	1–3	Stoke City (N)	Lancaster
14:00 BST (UTC+01:00)	Kay	Report	Keryakoplis 69', 81'; Palmer 52'	Stadium: Lancaster and Morecambe College; Attendance: 48

3 September 2017	Mossley Hill (N1)	0–1	Brighouse Town (N1)	Liverpool
14:00 BST (UTC+01:00)		Report	Beresford 9'	Stadium: Mossley Hill Athletic Club; Attendance: 30

3 September 2017	Newcastle United (N1)	0–3	Huddersfield Town (N)	Newcastle upon Tyne
14:00 BST (UTC+01:00)		Report	Mallin 5', 83'; Campbell 86'	Stadium: Newcastle University; Attendance: 69

3 September 2017	Norwich City (SE1)	0–5	Cardiff City (S)	Blofield
14:00 BST (UTC+01:00)		Report	Issac; Williams	Stadium: Plantation Park; Attendance: 72

3 September 2017	Queens Park Rangers (S)	0–3	Portsmouth (S)	West Drayton, London
14:00 BST (UTC+01:00)		Report	Clark; Stephens; Widdowson	Stadium: Honeycroft; Attendance: 50

3 September 2017	Sheffield United (M1)	6–0	Birmingham & West Midlands (M1)	Sheffield
14:00 BST (UTC+01:00)	Kenyon 9'; Brown 40'; Shaw 64', 76', 90'; Pearson 81'	Report		Stadium: Steelphalt Sheffield United Academy; Attendance: 43

3 September 2017	Solihull (M1)	1–2 (a.e.t.)	Guiseley Vixens (N)	Birmingham
14:00 BST (UTC+01:00)	Davies 112'	Report	Roberts 107'; O'Hara 117'	Stadium: West Midland Sports & Social Club; Attendance: 40

3 September 2017	Southampton Women's (SW1)	4–2	Denham United (SE1)	Southampton
14:00 BST (UTC+01:00)	Vokes 13'; Pinner 23'; Warren 31'	Report	Cheadle; Down	Stadium: Testwood Stadium; Attendance: 34

3 September 2017	St Nicholas (SW1)	0–5	Cambridge United (SE1)	Yate
14:00 BST (UTC+01:00)		Report	Gibson; Howlett; Jenkins; Peyton	Stadium: Lodge Road; Attendance: 40

3 September 2017	Steel City Wanderers (M1)	5–2 (a.e.t.)	Radcliffe Olympic (M1)	Sheffield
14:00 BST (UTC+01:00)	Bratton 38'; Ridley 42'; Middleton 93'; Beresford 101'; Mawhood 112'	Report	Evans 18'; Readman 25'	Stadium: Thorncliffe Recreation Ground; Attendance: 33

3 September 2017	Swindon Town (S)	0–11	Charlton Athletic (S)	Fairford
14:00 BST (UTC+01:00)		Report	Dorey 10', 17', 25', 85'; Lee 11'; Gurr 30', 49', 75'; Clifford 55', 63'; Nash 60'	Stadium: Cinder Lane; Attendance: 41

3 September 2017	The New Saints (M1)	3–3 (a.e.t.) (5–4 p)	Crewe Alexandra (N1)	Llanymynech
14:00 BST (UTC+01:00)	Taylor 19'; Canlett 30'; Ridge 106'	Report	Lambourne 27'; Garner 36'; Stebbings 110'	Stadium: Foxen Manor; Attendance: 54

3 September 2017	Wolverhampton Wanderers (N)	0–2	Liverpool Marshalls Feds (N1)	Hednesford
14:00 BST (UTC+01:00)		Report	Lee 44'; Thompson 62'	Stadium: Keys Park; Attendance: 45

3 September 2017	Nottingham Forest (N)	7–1	Leeds United (N1)	Nottingham
15:00 BST (UTC+01:00)	Darby 16'; Dicken 35', 48'; Griffin 46'; Parnell 50'; Kemp 70'; Greaves 79'	Report	Porritt 59'	Stadium: Mill Street Playing Fields; Attendance: 94

=== Preliminary round ===
With 36 teams progressing from the determining round, four needs to be eliminated to allow a single-elimination knockout tournament to take place. Twenty eight of the winners from the determining round were given byes to the first round, with eight teams being drawn against each other in preliminary round ties.

24 September 2017	Liverpool Marshalls Feds (N1)	3–1	Steel City Wanderers (M1)	Liverpool
14:00 BST (UTC+01:00)	Rowe 28'; Thompson 36'; Havelin 85'	Report	Ridley 53'	Stadium: I.M. Marsh Campus; Attendance: 40

24 September 2017	Poole Town (SW1)	0–8	Crystal Palace (S)	Milborne St Andrew
14:00 BST (UTC+01:00)		Report	Brya 18', 25', 30', 38', 45'; Whinnett 65'; Stenning 80'; Martin 89'	Stadium: Lane End; Attendance: 58

24 September 2017	Southampton Women's (SW1)	2–0 (a.e.t.)	Actonians (SE1)	Romsey
14:00 BST (UTC+01:00)	92' (o.g.); Yeates 101'	Report		Stadium: The Bypass Ground; Attendance: 50

24 September 2017	The New Saints (M1)	2–5	Leicester City (N)	Llanymynech
14:00 BST (UTC+01:00)	Bebbington 58'; Canlett 61'	Report	Dugmore 16'; Johnson 35', 72'; Mitcham 52'; Domingo 90'	Stadium: Foxen Manor; Attendance: 55

=== First round ===
15 October 2017	Charlton Athletic (S)	3–2	AFC Wimbledon (SE1)	Thamesmead, London
14:00 BST (UTC+01:00)	Lee 31', 61'; Gurr 90+8'	Report	Sargent 4'; Stanley 90+7'	Stadium: Bayliss Avenue; Attendance: 88

15 October 2017	Crystal Palace (S)	1–2	Lewes (S)	Kent
14:00 BST (UTC+01:00)	Goal	Report	Taylor 14'; Bergin 32'	Stadium: Hayes Lane; Attendance: 152

15 October 2017	Enfield Town (SE1)	0–2	Cambridge United (SE1)	Enfield
14:00 BST (UTC+01:00)		Report	Baker; Blanchflower	Stadium: Queen Elizabeth II Stadium; Attendance: 43

15 October 2017	Sheffield United (M1)	1–2	Liverpool Marshalls Feds (N1)	Sheffield
14:00 BST (UTC+01:00)	3' (o.g.)	Report	Bartup 68', 87'	Stadium: Steelphalt Sheffield United Academy; Attendance: 53

15 October 2017	Southampton Women's (SW1)	1–3	Portsmouth (S)	Southampton
14:00 BST (UTC+01:00)	Vokes	Report	Hillier 13'; Albuery 24'; Stephens 63'	Stadium: Testwood Stadium; Attendance: 108

15 October 2017	Stoke City (N)	2–2 (a.e.t.) (3–4 p)	Blackburn Rovers (N)	Stoke-on-Trent
14:00 BST (UTC+01:00)	Asher 1'; Owen 67'	Report	Shepherd 58'; Taylor 78'	Stadium: Community Drive; Attendance: 130

15 October 2017	Nottingham Forest (N)	5–0	West Bromwich Albion (N)	Nottingham
15:00 BST (UTC+01:00)	Emery 38', 90'; Hudson 43'; Greaves 48'; Conroy 71'	Report		Stadium: Mill Street Playing Fields; Attendance: 124

22 October 2017	Derby County (N)	5–2 (a.e.t.)	Bradford City (N)	Derby
14:00 BST (UTC+01:00)	Bonser 90'; Bell 90+6', 95', 104'; Tait 116'	Report	Olds; White	Stadium: The Don Amott Arena; Attendance: 106

22 October 2017	Ipswich Town (SE1)	A–W	C & K Basildon (S)	Felixstowe
14:00 BST (UTC+01:00)	Cossey	Report		Stadium: Dellwood Avenue; Attendance: 46

22 October 2017	Loughborough Foxes (M1)	2–0	Middlesbrough (N)	Loughborough
14:00 BST (UTC+01:00)	Tugby 20'; Cooper 43'	Report		Stadium: Loughborough University Football Stadium; Attendance: 60

22 October 2017	Stevenage (SE1)	0–2	Coventry United (S)	Hertford
14:00 BST (UTC+01:00)		Report	Hall 11'; Dermody 55'	Stadium: Hertingfordbury Park; Attendance: 45

29 October 2017	Brighouse Town (N1)	5–1	Chester Le Street (N1)	Brighouse
14:00 GMT (UTC+00:00)	Redgrave 11', 50', 70'; Beresford 36'; Proud 80'	Report	Goundry-Havery 76'	Stadium: The Duel Seal Stadium; Attendance: 65

29 October 2017	Cardiff City (S)	3–1	Leyton Orient (SE1)	Ystrad Mynach
14:00 GMT (UTC+00:00)	Powell; Williams	Report	Bastyr 85'	Stadium: CCB Centre for Sporting Excellence; Attendance: 85

29 October 2017	Guiseley Vixens (N)	3–2	Huddersfield Town (N)	Guiseley
14:00 GMT (UTC+00:00)	Njie 67'; Berko 72'; Scott 90'	Report	Nutter 40'; Danby 56'	Stadium: Nethermoor Park; Attendance: 75

29 October 2017	Leicester City (N)	3–0	Bolton Wanderers (N1)	Quorn
14:00 GMT (UTC+00:00)	Axten 9', 89'; Mitcham 75'	Report		Stadium: Farley Way Stadium; Attendance: 78

29 October 2017	Plymouth Argyle (SW1)	3–1	Chichester City (S)	Plymouth
14:00 GMT (UTC+00:00)	Knapman 38', 65'; Marks 60'	Report	Widdows	Stadium: Haye Road; Attendance: 63

=== Second round ===
The eight second round matches were originally scheduled to be played on Sunday 10 December 2017 before they were all postponed due to severe weather throughout the country.

17 December 2017	Cardiff City (S)	1–2	Plymouth Argyle (SW1)	Ystrad Mynach
14:00 GMT (UTC+00:00)	Williams	Report	Atkins 20'; Knapman 68'	Stadium: CCB Centre for Sporting Excellence; Attendance: 50

17 December 2017	Leicester City (N)	3–1	Loughborough Foxes (M1)	Quorn
14:00 GMT (UTC+00:00)	Domingo 16'; Stewart 59'; Axten 79'	Report	Knight 57'	Stadium: Farley Way Stadium; Attendance: 95

14 January 2018	C & K Basildon (S)	1–2 (a.e.t.)	Charlton Athletic (S)	Canvey Island
14:00 GMT (UTC+00:00)	Addison	Report	Gurr 53'; Graham 111'	Stadium: The Frost Financial Stadium; Attendance: 147

14 January 2018	Lewes (S)	5–1	Portsmouth (S)	Lewes
14:00 GMT (UTC+00:00)	Currie 19' (o.g.); McIntyre 30'; Kempson 31'; Carleton 59'; Bridges 83'	Report	Panting 57'	Stadium: The Dripping Pan; Attendance: 196

14 January 2018	Liverpool Marshalls Feds (N1)	1–2	Blackburn Rovers (N)	Liverpool
14:00 GMT (UTC+00:00)	Lee 16'	Report	Cunliffe 5'; Taylor 73'	Stadium: I.M. Marsh Campus; Attendance: 110

14 January 2018	Nottingham Forest (N)	5–0	Guiseley Vixens (N)	Nottingham
14:00 GMT (UTC+00:00)	Emery 8', 48'; Griffin 52', 66'; Holmes 63'	Report		Stadium: Mill Street Playing Fields; Attendance: 73

28 January 2018	Brighouse Town (N1)	3–2	Derby County (N)	Brighouse
14:00 GMT (UTC+00:00)	Redgrave 47', 90'; Beresford 87'	Report	Tait 25'; Ward 30'	Stadium: The Duel Seal Stadium; Attendance: 92

28 January 2018	Cambridge United (SE1)	0–5	Coventry United (S)	Mildenhall
14:00 GMT (UTC+00:00)		Report	Hall 9'; Brook 50', 80'; Haigh 59'; Lundie 90'	Stadium: Recreation Way; Attendance: 70

=== Quarter-finals ===
11 February 2018	Charlton Athletic (S)	1–2 (a.e.t.)	Lewes (S)	Thamesmead, London
14:00 GMT (UTC+00:00)	Graham 38'	Report	Kempston 21', 110'	Stadium: Bayliss Avenue; Attendance: 242

18 February 2018	Brighouse Town (N1)	1–2	Blackburn Rovers (N)	Brighouse
14:00 GMT (UTC+00:00)	Doyle 83'	Report	Fenton 27'; Montgomery 88'	Stadium: The Duel Seal Stadium; Attendance: 107

25 February 2018	Nottingham Forest (N)	1–1 (a.e.t.) (4–5 p)	Leicester City (N)	Nottingham
14:00 GMT (UTC+00:00)	Hudson 55'	Report	May 34'	Stadium: Mill Street Playing Fields; Attendance: 145

25 February 2018	Plymouth Argyle (SW1)	0–3	Coventry United (S)	Plymouth
14:00 GMT (UTC+00:00)		Report	Miles 18', 70'; Hughes 58'	Stadium: Haye Road; Attendance: 55

=== Semi-finals ===
11 March 2018	Leicester City (N)	4–2	Lewes (S)	Quorn
14:00 GMT (UTC+00:00)	Dugmore 12'; Morgan 16'; Domingo 46', 52'	Report	Taylor 10'; Kempson 90+4'	Stadium: Farley Way Stadium

25 March 2018	Blackburn Rovers (N)	2–2 (a.e.t.) (3–2 p)	Coventry United (S)	Bamber Bridge
14:00 BST (UTC+01:00)	Jordan 69', 90+1'	Report	Davies 41'; Dermody 50'	Stadium: Sir Tom Finney Stadium; Attendance: 197

=== Final ===
29 April 2018
14:00 BST (UTC+01:00)

Blackburn Rovers (N)	3–1	Leicester City (N)
Shepherd 33'; Cook 74'; Jordan 90'	Report	Domingo 14'

Proact Stadium, Chesterfield
Referee: Amy Fearn (Derbyshire)

Blackburn Rovers	Leicester City
