= 2016–17 FA Women's Premier League Cup =

Tournament details
- Country: England
- Teams: 72

Final positions
- Champions: Tottenham Hotspur
- Runners-up: Charlton Athletic

Tournament statistics
- Matches played: 68
- Goals scored: 351 (5.16 per match)
- All statistics correct as of 7 May 2017.

The 2016–17 FA Women's Premier League Cup is the 26th running of the FA Women's Premier League Cup, which began in 1991. It is the major League Cup competition run by the FA Women's Premier League, and for the third season it is being run alongside their secondary League Cup competition, the Premier League Plate.

All 72 Premier League clubs entered at the Determining round, with the winners continuing in the competition and the losers going into the Premier League Plate tournament.

Going into the tournament, Tottenham Hotspur is the reigning champions, having defeated Cardiff City 2–1 after extra time the previous season.

== Results ==
All results listed are published by The Football Association. Games are listed by round in chronological order, and then in alphabetical order of the home team where matches were played simultaneously.

The division each team play in is indicated in brackets after their name: (S)=Southern Division; (N)=Northern Division; (SW1)=South West Division One; (SE1)=South East Division One; (M1)=Midlands Division One; (N1)=Northern Division One.

=== Determining round ===
The competition begins with a Determining Round, which consisted of all 72 teams in the FA Women's Premier League being drawn in pairs. The winners of these 36 games progressed to the next stage of the competition, while the losers qualified for the 2016–17 FA Women's Premier League Plate.

4 September 2016	AFC Wimbledon (SE1)	3–2	Plymouth Argyle (SW1)	Sutton, London
14:00 BST (UTC+01:00)	Wylie 25'; Whelan 34'; Sargent 70'	Report	Salt 35'; Wells 51'	Stadium: Borough Sports Ground; Attendance: 50

4 September 2016	Basingstoke (SW1)	3–0	Cheltenham Town (SW1)	Basingstoke
14:00 BST (UTC+01:00)	Butler 64'; Pearmine 75'; Randell 75'	Report		Stadium: The Ark Cancer Charity Stadium; Attendance: 40

4 September 2016	Blackburn Rovers (N)	19–0	Rotherham United (M1)	Bamber Bridge
14:00 BST (UTC+01:00)	McCoy 4', 15', 20', 61'; Toone 5', 13', 32', 45+1', 45+2', 74'; Jordan 7'; Strickland 57', 58', 60'; Holbrook 68'; Emma Rankin 75', 88'; Fenton 76'; McDonald 85'	Report		Stadium: Sir Tom Finney Stadium; Attendance: 64

4 September 2016	Blackpool Wren Rovers (N1)	5–0	Crewe Alexandra (N1)	Blackpool
14:00 BST (UTC+01:00)	Warren 28'; Berko 32', 83', 90'; Pullen 37'	Report		Stadium: Brews Park; Attendance: 35

4 September 2016	C & K Basildon (S)	8–0	St Nicholas (SW1)	Canvey Island
14:00 BST (UTC+01:00)	Kellett; Rushen; Sinclair; Rodney	Report		Stadium: The Frost Financial Stadium; Attendance: 60

4 September 2016	Cambridge United (SE1)	3–3 (a.e.t.) (4–2 p)	Lewes (S)	Mildenhall
14:00 BST (UTC+01:00)	Perschky 40', 109'; Taylor 90+5'	Report	Bridges 4'; Carter 25'; Logie 109' (o.g.)	Stadium: Recreation Way; Attendance: 52

4 September 2016	Charlton Athletic (S)	8–1	Shanklin (SW1)	Thamesmead, London
14:00 BST (UTC+01:00)	Shepherd 21', 40', 51', 73'; Graham 24'; Bergin 32', 77'; Newman 89'	Report	Morris	Stadium: Sporting Club Thamesmead; Attendance: 80

4 September 2016	Chichester City (SW1)	6–2	Actonians (SE1)	Chichester
14:00 BST (UTC+01:00)	Barron 32'; Challen 40'; Albuery 45', 67'; Alexandre 50'; Khassal 78'	Report	Berlin 55'; Williams	Stadium: Oaklands Park; Attendance: 65

4 September 2016	Coventry United (S)	9–0	Maidenhead United (SW1)	Coleshill
14:00 BST (UTC+01:00)	Dermody 7'; Gauntlett 17', 28', 68', 71', 79'; Cooper 34'; Hughes 47'; Brook 77'	Report		Stadium: Park Meadow; Attendance: 63

4 September 2016	Denham United (SE1)	2–1 (a.e.t.)	Swindon Town (S)	Ruislip
14:00 BST (UTC+01:00)	Down 111'; Bytyqi 120'	Report	Collings 102'	Stadium: The Middlesex Stadium; Attendance: 42

4 September 2016	Derby County (N)	7–0	Steel City Wanderers (M1)	Derby
14:00 BST (UTC+01:00)	Giampalma 1', 30'; Reay 31', 46'; Ledgister 43'; Johnson 49'; Dale 67'	Report		Stadium: The Don Amott Arena; Attendance: 45

4 September 2016	Enfield Town (SE1)	3–1	Exeter City (SW1)	Enfield
14:00 BST (UTC+01:00)	Beganovic 53'; Diaz 104'; Taladiana 115'	Report	Hill 65'	Stadium: Queen Elizabeth II Stadium; Attendance: 32

4 September 2016	Huddersfield Town (N)	1–2	Fylde Ladies (N)	Huddersfield
14:00 BST (UTC+01:00)	Mallin 70'	Report	Young 24'; Forshaw 56'	Stadium: The Stafflex Arena; Attendance: 89

4 September 2016	Hull City (N1)	3–0	Guiseley Vixens (N1)	Kingston upon Hull
14:00 BST (UTC+01:00)	Beech; Thompson	Report		Stadium: Hull University Sports Ground; Attendance: 45

4 September 2016	Ipswich Town (SE1)	0–5	Cardiff City (S)	Felixstowe
14:00 BST (UTC+01:00)		Report	Chivers; Lloyd; Suominen; Williams	Stadium: The Goldstar Ground; Attendance: 37

4 September 2016	Keynsham Town (SW1)	1–2	Crystal Palace (S)	Keynsham
14:00 BST (UTC+01:00)	Alves	Report	Bryan; Shakes	Stadium: AJN Stadium

4 September 2016	Long Eaton United (M1)	13–0	Loughborough Students (M1)	Long Eaton
14:00 BST (UTC+01:00)	Newton 2', 45+2', 57', 75'; Pashley 10', 20'; Hamilton 12', 59', 82'; Lowther 24'; Croxall 37', 57'; Young 54'	Report		Stadium: Grange Park; Attendance: 42

4 September 2016	Loughborough Foxes (M1)	9–3	Leicester City LFC (M1)	Leicester
14:00 BST (UTC+01:00)	Chambers; Young; Cooper; Pilling	Report	Bateman 15'; Bugajska 58'; Brant 65'	Stadium: Saffron Lane; Attendance: 65

4 September 2016	Luton Town (SE1)	1–3	Milton Keynes Dons (SE1)	Luton
14:00 BST (UTC+01:00)	Byrne	Report	Barrett; Loftus; McDonnell	Stadium: Stockwood Park Athletics Stadium; Attendance: 81

4 September 2016	Morecambe (N1)	0–3	Middlesbrough (N)	Lancaster
14:00 BST (UTC+01:00)		Report	Higgins 82'; Owens 25', 49'	Stadium: Lancaster and Morecambe College; Attendance: 42

4 September 2016	Mossley Hill (N1)	0–5	Brighouse Town (N1)	Liverpool
14:00 BST (UTC+01:00)		Report	White 45+1'; Barker 49'; Brown 71'; McGill 88'; Starkie 89'	Stadium: Mossley Hill Athletic Club

4 September 2016	Newcastle United (N)	2–1	Leicester City (N)	Newcastle upon Tyne
14:00 BST (UTC+01:00)	Burn; Williams	Report	Axten 87'	Stadium: Newcastle United Sport Ground; Attendance: 82

4 September 2016	Nottingham Forest (N)	3–1 (a.e.t.)	Chorley (N1)	Nottingham
14:00 BST (UTC+01:00)	Harkin 52', 111'; Bell 119'	Report	Ball 7'	Stadium: Mill Street Playing Fields; Attendance: 68

4 September 2016	Portsmouth (S)	8–2	Lowestoft Town (SE1)	Gosport
14:00 BST (UTC+01:00)	Currie 9', 72'; Kempson 16', 40', 60'; Sherwood 31', 54'; Hillier 83'	Report	Moore 18'; Scully 23'	Stadium: Aerial Direct Stadium; Attendance: 52

4 September 2016	Queens Park Rangers (S)	2–3	Norwich City (SE1)	West Drayton, London
14:00 BST (UTC+01:00)	Critchley 6'; Thompson 70'	Report	Garrett 14'; Wiseman 29'; Love 81'	Stadium: Honeycroft; Attendance: 35

4 September 2016	Southampton Saints (SW1)	0–4	Gillingham (SE1)	Sholing
14:00 BST (UTC+01:00)		Report	Hardaker; Taylor	Stadium: VT Group Sportsground

4 September 2016	Sporting Khalsa (M1)	2–4	Chester-le-Street (N1)	Willenhall
14:00 BST (UTC+01:00)	Arrowsmith; Bragan	Report	Collin; Johnson	Stadium: Aspray Arena; Attendance: 15

4 September 2016	Stevenage (SE1)	0–3	Larkhall Athletic (SW1)	Hertford
14:00 BST (UTC+01:00)		Report	Bryant; German 87'; German	Stadium: Hertingfordbury Park; Attendance: 62

4 September 2016	Stoke City (N)	13–0	Birmingham & West Midlands (M1)	Stone
14:00 BST (UTC+01:00)	Bowyer; Gibson; Hayes; Hudson; Iddenden; Keryakoplis; Ball; Elson	Report		Stadium: Community Drive; Attendance: 122

4 September 2016	The New Saints (M1)	3–0	Solihull (M1)	Oswestry
14:00 BST (UTC+01:00)	Ridge 44'; Budd 56'; Jones 77'	Report		Stadium: Park Hall Stadium

4 September 2016	Tranmere Rovers (N1)	0–5	Liverpool Marshall Feds (N1)	Ellesmere Port
14:00 BST (UTC+01:00)		Report	Seagraves 8'; Thompson 32', 71'; Lee 52'; Gresty 88'	Stadium: Ellesmere Port Sports Village 3G; Attendance: 50

4 September 2016	West Bromwich Albion (N)	2–1	Bradford City (N)	Rushall
14:00 BST (UTC+01:00)	Holmes 30'; Mitcham	Report	Olds 90+1'	Stadium: Dales Lane; Attendance: 49

4 September 2016	West Ham United (S)	0–10	Tottenham Hotspur (S)	Upminster, London
14:00 BST (UTC+01:00)		Report	Baptiste; Hector; Leon; Martin; Pond; Squillaci; Whinnett; Blanchflower	Stadium: Hornchurch Stadium; Attendance: 173

4 September 2016	Wolverhampton Wanderers (M1)	3–2	Radcliffe Olympic (M1)	Bentley
14:00 BST (UTC+01:00)	Whetton 58'; Anslow 82'; James 84'	Report	Robinson 9', 70'	Stadium: Bentley Leisure Pavilion; Attendance: 50

Walkover	Forest Green Rovers (S)	A–W	Brislington (SW1)	Slimbridge
		Report		Stadium: Wisloe Road

Walkover	Leeds (N1)	H–W	Nuneaton Town (N)	Garforth
		Report		Stadium: Genix Healthcare Stadium

=== First round ===
With 36 teams progressing from the determining round, four needed to be eliminated to allow a single-elimination knockout tournament to take place. Twenty eight of the winners from the determining round were given byes to the second round, with eight teams being drawn against each other in first round ties.

25 September 2016	Blackburn Rovers (N)	3–1	Nottingham Forest (N)	Bamber Bridge
14:00 BST (UTC+01:00)	Shepherd 19'; Jordon 21'; McDonald 80'	Report	Lowder 24'	Stadium: Sir Tom Finney Stadium; Attendance: 89

25 September 2016	Denham United (SE1)	3–2	Brislington (SW1)	Denham
14:00 BST (UTC+01:00)	Banfield; French; Durn 90+2'	Report	Wardle 25', 40'	Stadium: The Den; Attendance: 103

25 September 2016	Gillingham (SE1)	8–2	Norwich City (SE1)	Chatham
14:00 BST (UTC+01:00)	Taylor 15'; Tune 19'; Bowers 21'; Symond 45+1'; Keogh 66', 89'; Gibbons 69'; Nugent 81'	Report	Garrett 42', 84'	Stadium: The Sports Ground; Attendance: 62

25 September 2016	Long Eaton United (M1)	1–1 (a.e.t.) (3–4 p)	Liverpool Marshall Feds (N1)	Long Eaton
14:00 BST (UTC+01:00)	Hamilton 32'	Report	Havelin 47'	Stadium: Grange Park; Attendance: 67

=== Second round ===
16 October 2016	Charlton Athletic (S)	3–2	C & K Basildon (S)	Thamesmead, London
14:00 BST (UTC+01:00)	Graham 19', 23', 50'	Report	Porter; Rushen	Stadium: Sporting Club Thamesmead; Attendance: 107

16 October 2016	Hull City (N1)	3–1	Middlesbrough (N)	Kingston upon Hull
14:00 BST (UTC+01:00)	Beech; Thompson; Whitwell	Report	Foster 45'	Stadium: Hull University Sports Ground; Attendance: 40

16 October 2016	Leeds (N1)	1–4	Liverpool Marshall Feds (N1)	Garforth
14:00 BST (UTC+01:00)	Sarri 32'	Report	Lee 1'; Longhurst 87'; Havelin 77'; Kinvig 79'	Stadium: Genix Healthcare Stadium; Attendance: 63

16 October 2016	Loughborough Foxes (M1)	10–1	The New Saints (M1)	Loughborough
14:00 BST (UTC+01:00)	Chambers; Cooper; Eastham; Matlock; Pilling; Young	Report	Ridge 32'	Stadium: Loughborough University Stadium; Attendance: 56

16 October 2016	Stoke City (N)	1–2 (a.e.t.)	Derby County (N)	Stone
14:00 BST (UTC+01:00)	Hayes	Report	May 46'; Johnson 100'	Stadium: Community Drive

16 October 2016	Wolverhampton Wanderers (M1)	2–2 (a.e.t.) (4–2 p)	Brighouse Town (N1)	Hednesford
14:00 BST (UTC+01:00)	Perks 20'; Quick 54'	Report	Redgrave	Stadium: Keys Park; Attendance: 76

23 October 2016	AFC Wimbledon (SE1)	0–2	Crystal Palace (S)	Sutton, London
14:00 BST (UTC+01:00)		Report	Bryan 57'; Shakes 81'	Stadium: Borough Sports Ground; Attendance: 100

23 October 2016	Chester-le-Street (N1)	3–0	Blackpool Wren Rovers (N1)	Chester Moor
14:00 BST (UTC+01:00)	Goundry-Havery; Hockaday; Johnson	Report		Stadium: Moor Park; Attendance: 30

23 October 2016	Coventry United (S)	3–0	Denham United (SE1)	Coleshill
14:00 BST (UTC+01:00)	Neville 66'; Brook 82'; Dermody 86'	Report		Stadium: Park Meadow; Attendance: 58

23 October 2016	Gillingham (SE1)	2–0	Milton Keynes Dons (SE1)	Chatham
14:00 BST (UTC+01:00)	Balfour 50', 60'	Report		Stadium: The Sports Ground; Attendance: 93

23 October 2016	Newcastle United (N)	0–1	Blackburn Rovers (N)	Newcastle upon Tyne
14:00 BST (UTC+01:00)		Report	Taylor	Stadium: Newcastle United Sport Ground; Attendance: 102

23 October 2016	Portsmouth (S)	3–2	Cambridge United (SE1)	Gosport
14:00 BST (UTC+01:00)	Hillier 45+1'; Kempson 61', 84'	Report	Kmita; Perschky	Stadium: Aerial Direct Stadium; Attendance: 52

23 October 2016	Tottenham Hotspur (S)	5–1	Enfield Town (SE1)	Cheshunt
14:00 BST (UTC+01:00)	Wayne; Leon; Martin	Report	Taladiana 75'	Stadium: Cheshunt Stadium; Attendance: 117

23 October 2016	West Bromwich Albion (N)	2–1 (a.e.t.)	Fylde Ladies (N)	Rushall
14:00 BST (UTC+01:00)	Dugmore 20'; Stewart 90+6'	Report	Carroll	Stadium: Dales Lane; Attendance: 74

30 October 2016	Basingstoke (SW1)	0–5	Chichester City (SW1)	Basingstoke
14:00 GMT (UTC+00:00)		Report	Wilson-Blakely 25', 67'; Widdows 32', 65'; Price 39'	Stadium: The Ark Cancer Charity Stadium; Attendance: 55

Walkover	Cardiff City (S)	H–W	Larkhall Athletic (SW1)	Ystrad Mynach
		Report		Stadium: CCB Centre for Sporting Excellence

=== Third round ===
6 November 2016	Blackburn Rovers (N)	5–0	Loughborough Foxes (M1)	Bamber Bridge
14:00 GMT (UTC+00:00)	Fenton 20'; Toone 60', 70'; Taylor 74'; Montgomery 81'	Report		Stadium: Sir Tom Finney Stadium; Attendance: 91

6 November 2016	Cardiff City (S)	7–1	Chichester City (SW1)	Ystrad Mynach
14:00 GMT (UTC+00:00)	Bartlett 2'; Williams 15', 16'; Williams 27'; Chivers 30', 62'; Britton 34'	Report	Dowdell 9'	Stadium: CCB Centre for Sporting Excellence; Attendance: 82

6 November 2016	Charlton Athletic (S)	4–2	Portsmouth (S)	Thamesmead, London
14:00 GMT (UTC+00:00)	Graham 47', 52', 70'; Dunne 56'	Report	Quayle 29'; Hillier 81'	Stadium: Sporting Club Thamesmead; Attendance: 84

6 November 2016	Chester-le-Street (N1)	2–1	Derby County (N)	Chester Moor
14:00 GMT (UTC+00:00)	Goundry-Havery; Johnson	Report	Johnson 32'	Stadium: Moor Park; Attendance: 30

6 November 2016	Crystal Palace (S)	1–0	Coventry United (S)	Kent
14:00 GMT (UTC+00:00)	Shakes 80'	Report		Stadium: Hayes Lane; Attendance: 147

6 November 2016	Hull City (N1)	0–4	Liverpool Marshall Feds (N1)	Kingston upon Hull
14:00 GMT (UTC+00:00)		Report	Mendes 25'; Seagraves 27'; Havelin 38'; Clark 59'	Stadium: Hull University Sports Ground; Attendance: 30

6 November 2016	West Bromwich Albion (N)	1–0 (a.e.t.)	Wolverhampton Wanderers (M1)	Rushall
14:00 GMT (UTC+00:00)	Dugmore 90+8'	Report		Stadium: Dales Lane; Attendance: 100

6 November 2016	Tottenham Hotspur (S)	4–2	Gillingham (SE1)	Cheshunt
14:00 GMT (UTC+00:00)	Leon; Martin; Vio; (o.g.)	Report	Gibbons 62'; Taylor 87'	Stadium: Cheshunt Stadium; Attendance: 77

=== Quarter-finals ===
11 December 2016	Liverpool Marshall Feds (N1)	0–2	Cardiff City (S)	Aigburth
13:00 GMT (UTC+00:00)		Report	Green; Williams	Stadium: IM Marsh Sports Centre; Attendance: 40

11 December 2016	Charlton Athletic (S)	1–1 (a.e.t.) (4–2 p)	West Bromwich Albion (N)	Thamesmead, London
14:00 GMT (UTC+00:00)	Graham 19'	Report	Dicken 32'	Stadium: Sporting Club Thamesmead; Attendance: 57

11 December 2016	Chester-le-Street (N1)	1–3	Blackburn Rovers (N)	Chester Moor
14:00 GMT (UTC+00:00)	Johnson	Report	Shepherd 23'; Holbrook 78'; Jordon 90+8'	Stadium: Moor Park

11 December 2016	Tottenham Hotspur (S)	4–1	Crystal Palace (S)	Cheshunt
14:00 GMT (UTC+00:00)	Whinnett 1', 6'; Martin 39'; Baptiste 67'	Report	Shakes 51'	Stadium: Cheshunt Stadium; Attendance: 49

=== Semi-finals ===
5 March 2017	Tottenham Hotspur (S)	3–0	Cardiff City (S)	Cheshunt
14:00 GMT (UTC+00:00)	Martin 31'; Rawle 53'; Whinnett 82'	Report		Stadium: Cheshunt Stadium; Attendance: 81

5 March 2017	Charlton Athletic (S)	4–3 (a.e.t.)	Blackburn Rovers (N)	London
14:00 GMT (UTC+00:00)	Graham 36'; Shepherd 49'; Simmons 114', 117'	Report	Jordon 75', 120'; Shepherd 86' (pen.)	Stadium: Sporting Club Thamesmead; Attendance: 152

=== Final ===
7 May 2017
14:00 BST (UTC+01:00)

Charlton Athletic (S)	0–0 (a.e.t.)	Tottenham Hotspur (S)
	Report
Penalties
Dixson (penalty missed); Southgate (penalty scored); Graham (penalty scored); Lee (penalty scored); Coombs (penalty missed)	3–4	(penalty scored) Hector; (penalty scored) McClean; (penalty missed) Martin; (penalty scored) Pond; (penalty scored) O'Leary

Lamex Stadium, Stevenage
Attendance: 544

Charlton Athletic	Tottenham Hotspur
