= Jenna Carroll =

English footballer

Personal information
- Date of birth: 8 May 1990 (age 36)
- Place of birth: Preston, England
- Position: Defender

Team information
- Current team: Fylde
- Number: 6

Youth career
- Blackburn Rovers

Senior career*
| Years | Team | Apps | (Gls) |
| 2006–10 | Blackburn Rovers | 43 | (2) |
| 2010– | Fylde | 148 | (24) |
- * Club domestic league appearances and goals as of 15:41, 28 October 2009 (UTC)

Jenna Carroll (born 8 May 1990) is an English female football defender. She currently plays for Fylde.

== Early life ==
Carroll was born in Preston.

== Club career ==
Carroll spent over six years with Blackburn's centre of excellence before making her National Division debut in December 2006.

In October 2008, Carroll was one of four Rovers players to be sent off, the others being Katie Anderton, Natalie Brewer and Natalie Preston, as they drew 4–4 in the Women's Premier League Cup against Portsmouth Ladies.

== Statistics ==
| Club | Season | League | | WFA Cup | | Premier League Cup | | County Cup | | Other | | Total | |
| Club | Season | Apps | Goals | Apps | Goals | Apps | Goals | Apps | Goals | Apps | Goals | Apps | Goals |
|---|---|---|---|---|---|---|---|---|---|---|---|---|---|
| Blackburn Rovers Ladies | 2006–07 | 10 | 1 | 1 | 0 | 0 | 0 | 2 | 0 | 0 | 0 | 13 | 1 |
| Blackburn Rovers Ladies | 2007–08 | 16 | 1 | 3 | 0 | 0 | 0 | 4 | 1 | 0 | 0 | 23 | 2 |
| Blackburn Rovers Ladies | 2008–09 | 13 | 0 | 1 | 0 | 2 | 0 | 2 | 0 | 0 | 0 | 18 | 0 |
| Blackburn Rovers Ladies | 2009–10 | 4 | 0 | 0 | 0 | 2 | 0 | 1 | 0 | 0 | 0 | 7 | 0 |
| Career total | | 43 | 2 | 5 | 0 | 4 | 0 | 9 | 1 | 0 | 0 | 61 | 3 |
