= Radburn =

Radburn may refer to:

== Places ==
- Radburn, New Jersey, an American suburb and the basis for later housing planning designs known as 'Radburn estates'
- Radburn (NJT station), railway station

== People ==
- Jade Radburn, English football defender
- Will Radburn, English rugby union footballer

== Other ==
- Radburn design housing, a housing estate planning design
