= 2017–18 FA Women's Premier League Plate =

WPL Plate

Tournament details
- Country: England
- Teams: 35

Final positions
- Champions: West Ham United
- Runners-up: Luton Town

Tournament statistics
- Matches played: 36
- Goals scored: 164 (4.56 per match)

The 2017–18 FA Women's Premier League Plate is the fourth running of the competition, which began in 2014. It is the secondary League Cup competition run by the FA Women's Premier League (FA WPL), and is run in parallel with the league's primary League Cup competition, the Premier League Cup.

The teams that take part in the WPL plate are decided after the determining round of the WPL Cup. The winners of determining round matches continue in the WPL Cup, while the losers move into the WPL Plate.

All 71 Premier League clubs were included in the determining round draw, with 36 teams progressing in the Cup and 35 continuing in the Plate.

Reigning champions Lewes, who beat Huddersfield Town 4–0 in the 2016–17 final, won their determining Round match this season, meaning that they did not defend their title.

== Results ==
All results listed are published by The Football Association. Games are listed by round in chronological order, and then in alphabetical order of the home team where matches were played simultaneously.

The division each team play in is indicated in brackets after their name: (S)=Southern Division; (N)=Northern Division; (SW1)=South West Division One; (SE1)=South East Division One; (M1)=Midlands Division One; (N1)=Northern Division One.

=== Preliminary round ===
Due to there being 35 teams in the competition, three preliminary round matches are played to eliminate three teams allowing a full single-elimination knockout tournament to take place.

24 September 2017	Chorley (N1)	2–1	Rotherham United (M1)	Leyland
14:00 BST (UTC+01:00)	Cullin 30'; Laura Walker 76'	Report	McDuff-Viau	Stadium: Jim Fowler Memorial Fields; Attendance: 72

24 September 2017	St Nicholas (SW1)	2–2 (a.e.t.) (4–2 p)	Basingstoke Town (SW1)	Yate
14:00 BST (UTC+01:00)	Robbins 14'; Rendall 90+2'	Report	Ogle 61', 72'	Stadium: Lodge Road; Attendance: 50

Walkover	Hull City (N1)	H–W	Leicester City Ladies (M1)	Hull
		Report		Stadium: Hull University Sports Ground

=== First round ===
15 October 2017	Norwich City (SE1)	5–0	Haringey Borough (SE1)	Blofield
14:00 BST (UTC+01:00)	Snelling 13'; Broad 30'; Durrant 56', 85'; Thacker 90+4'	Report		Stadium: Plantation Park; Attendance: 40

22 October 2017	Keynsham Town (SW1)	4–0	St Nicholas (SW1)	Keynsham
13:00 BST (UTC+01:00)	Cook 6', 86'; Bryant 31'; Brown 81'	Report		Stadium: AJN Stadium; Attendance: 45

22 October 2017	Barnsley (N1)	1–3	Chorley (N1)	Barnsley
14:00 BST (UTC+01:00)	Woodruff	Report	Laura Walker 52', 69'; Searson 88'	Stadium: Barnsley F.C. Academy; Attendance: 65

22 October 2017	Birmingham & West Midlands (M1)	3–1	Sporting Khalsa (M1)	Birmingham
14:00 BST (UTC+01:00)	Fisher 21', 72', 88'	Report	Glover	Stadium: The Vale Stadium; Attendance: 30

22 October 2017	Cheltenham Town (SW1)	2–4	Brislington (SW1)	Cheltenham
14:00 BST (UTC+01:00)	Wealls; Briscoe	Report	Arkell 8', 65'; Heal 29'; Maggs 34'	Stadium: Petersfield Park; Attendance: 63

22 October 2017	Gillingham (S)	3–4 (a.e.t.)	Luton Town (SE1)	Aylesford
14:00 BST (UTC+01:00)	Farmer 70'; Manktelow 107', 110'	Report	Henman; McKay	Stadium: K Sports Cobdown

22 October 2017	Leeds United (N1)	3–2	Solihull (M1)	Garforth
14:00 BST (UTC+01:00)	Morris; Stuart	Report	Dickinson 18'; Taylor 80'	Stadium: Genix Healthcare Stadium; Attendance: 79

22 October 2017	Milton Keynes Dons (SE1)	2–0	Denham United (SE1)	Newport Pagnell
14:00 BST (UTC+01:00)	Hazard; Newman	Report		Stadium: Willen Road; Attendance: 85

22 October 2017	Southampton Saints (SW1)	3–0	Larkhall Athletic (SW1)	Sholing
14:00 BST (UTC+01:00)	Matthews 34'; Buckingham 41'; Libby O'Dell 78'	Report		Stadium: VT Group Sportsground; Attendance: 15

22 October 2017	Swindon Town (S)	7–1	Maidenhead United (SW1)	Fairford
14:00 BST (UTC+01:00)	Martin 36', 49', 90+2'; Mugford 44', 59'; Arrell 62'; Goodright 65'	Report	Casey 57'	Stadium: Cinder Lane; Attendance: 47

22 October 2017	West Ham United (S)	3–1	Queens Park Rangers (S)	Aveley
14:00 BST (UTC+01:00)	Burr 17'; Stobbs 44'; Austin 56'	Report	Knell 48'	Stadium: Ship Lane; Attendance: 1052

22 October 2017	Wolverhampton Wanderers (N)	1–2 (a.e.t.)	Long Eaton United (M1)	Hednesford
14:00 BST (UTC+01:00)	Haynes 40'	Report	Adam 35'; Arber 95'	Stadium: Keys Park; Attendance: 50

29 October 2017	Fylde Ladies (N)	3–2	Burton Albion (M1)	Wesham
14:00 GMT (UTC+00:00)	Charlton 7'; Davies 30'; Kelsh 75'	Report	9'; Cordon 50'	Stadium: Mill Farm; Attendance: 53

29 October 2017	Morecambe (N1)	1–5	Hull City (N1)	Lancaster
14:00 GMT (UTC+00:00)	Brown	Report	Ackroyd; Thompson; Bott; Knight	Stadium: Lancaster and Morecambe College; Attendance: 35

29 October 2017	Mossley Hill (N1)	2–3	Crewe Alexandra (N1)	Liverpool
14:00 GMT (UTC+00:00)	Davenport 55'; Mortimer 73'	Report	Grice 8'; Derry 19'; Fallon 75'	Stadium: Mossley Hill Athletic Club; Attendance: 35

29 October 2017	Newcastle United (N1)	2–0	Radcliffe Olympic (M1)	Newcastle upon Tyne
14:00 GMT (UTC+00:00)	Ord	Report		Stadium: Newcastle University; Attendance: 30

=== Second round ===
The eight second round matches were originally scheduled to be played on Sunday 10 December 2017 before all except one were postponed due to severe weather throughout the country.

10 December 2017	Hull City (N1)	1–0	Newcastle United (N1)	Hull
14:00 GMT (UTC+00:00)	Ackroyd	Report		Stadium: Hull University Sports Ground; Attendance: 20

17 December 2017	Birmingham & West Midlands (M1)	3–1	Crewe Alexandra (N1)	Birmingham
14:00 GMT (UTC+00:00)	Eastwood; Fisher; Roberts	Report	Booth 55'	Stadium: The Vale Stadium; Attendance: 25

17 December 2017	Long Eaton United (M1)	0–2	Chorley (N1)	Long Eaton
14:00 GMT (UTC+00:00)		Report	Wood 24'; Smith 62'	Stadium: Grange Park; Attendance: 44

7 January 2018	Norwich City (SE1)	2–4	Milton Keynes Dons (SE1)	Blofield
14:00 GMT (UTC+00:00)	Garrett 42'; Drake 49'	Report	Hazard; McDonnell; Newsome; Wright	Stadium: Plantation Park; Attendance: 35

14 January 2018	Brislington (SW1)	0–6	West Ham United (S)	Brislington
14:00 GMT (UTC+00:00)		Report	Kimita 10', 26', 89'; Peters 60'; Stobbs 70'; Weathall 76'	Stadium: Ironmould Lane; Attendance: 63

14 January 2018	Fylde Ladies (N)	0–0 (a.e.t.) (4–3 p)	Leeds United (N1)	Preston
14:00 GMT (UTC+00:00)		Report		Stadium: Kellamergh Park; Attendance: 58

14 January 2018	Luton Town (SE1)	3–1	Southampton Saints (SW1)	Luton
14:00 GMT (UTC+00:00)	Fensome; McKay	Report	Whyte 60'	Stadium: Stockwood Park Athletics Stadium; Attendance: 27

14 January 2018	Swindon Town (S)	1–10	Keynsham Town (SW1)	Fairford
14:00 GMT (UTC+00:00)	Arrell 13'	Report	Lorton 8', 45'; Vega 12', 82'; Bartlett 20', 22', 24', 41', 43'; White 62'	Stadium: Cinder Lane; Attendance: 44

=== Quarter-finals ===
11 February 2018	Birmingham & West Midlands (M1)	1–5	Fylde Ladies (N)	Birmingham
14:00 GMT (UTC+00:00)	Jennings	Report	Charlton; Fuller; Merrin	Stadium: The Vale Stadium

11 February 2018	Hull City (N1)	4–0	Chorley (N1)	Hull
14:00 GMT (UTC+00:00)	Symington; Knight; Tanser; Beech	Report		Stadium: Hull University Sports Ground; Attendance: 60

11 February 2018	West Ham United (S)	7–0	Keynsham Town (SW1)	Aveley
14:00 GMT (UTC+00:00)	Weathall 5'; Mabey 18', 31'; Stobbs 34', 38', 79'; Peters 84'	Report		Stadium: Ship Lane; Attendance: 189

25 February 2018	Luton Town (SE1)	3–2	Milton Keynes Dons (SE1)	Luton
14:00 GMT (UTC+00:00)	Carroll; Fensome; Henman	Report	Holland; Hughes	Stadium: Stockwood Park Athletics Stadium; Attendance: 71

=== Semi-finals ===
4 March 2018
14:00 GMT (UTC+00:00)

Hull City (N1)	0–3	West Ham United (S)
	Report	Weathall 60', 63'; Georgiou 73'

Hull University Sports Ground, Hull
Attendance: 80
11 March 2018
14:00 GMT (UTC+00:00)

Luton Town (SE1)	W–O (Note: Fylde Ladies won the game 2–1 before being disqualified.)	Fylde Ladies (N)
Henman	Report	Wild 78'; Hinchcliffe 82'

Stockwood Park Athletics Stadium, Luton
Attendance: 61

=== Final ===
15 April 2018
15:00 BST (UTC+01:00)

West Ham United (S)	5–0	Luton Town (SE1)
Stobbs 25'; Wealthall 29'; Zoepfl 48', 73'; Kmita 62'	Report

Keys Park, Hednesford

West Ham United	Luton Town
