= Natalie Preston =

English footballer

Personal information
- Date of birth: 16 August 1977 (age 49)
- Place of birth: Liverpool, England
- Position: Midfielder

Senior career*
Years	Team	Apps	(Gls)
- Everton
–2003	Tranmere Rovers		
2003–2007	Leeds Carnegie		
2007–2010	Blackburn Rovers		
2010	Liverpool		
- * Club domestic league appearances and goals as of 16:06, 28 October 2009 (UTC)

Natalie Preston (born 16 August 1977) is an English female former football midfielder.

== Club career ==
Preston captained Tranmere Rovers Ladies before joining Leeds Carnegie in the 2003 close season. She went on to captain Leeds.

In May 2006, Preston played for Leeds as they lost 5–0 to Arsenal Ladies in the FA Women's Cup final.

Preston joined Blackburn Rovers Ladies in the 2007 close season.

In October 2008, Preston was one of four Rovers players to be sent off, the others being Katie Anderton, Jenna Carroll and Natalie Brewer, as they drew 4–4 in the Women's Premier League Cup against Portsmouth Ladies.

In the 2010 close season she moved to Liverpool Ladies, scoring in a friendly defeat to Atlético Madrid Féminas, but she retired before the start of the 2011 FA WSL season.

She has also played for Everton Ladies.

== International career ==
Preston has represented England at youth level.

== Personal life ==
While with Tranmere and Leeds, Preston had a cat named Susie Wong, which resulted in Sue Smith, her teammate at both clubs, gaining the nickname 'Wongy'.

== Blackburn statistics ==
Up to October 2009

Club	Season	League		WFA Cup		Premier League Cup		County Cup		Total	
Club	Season	Apps	Goals	Apps	Goals	Apps	Goals	Apps	Goals	Apps	Goals
Blackburn Rovers Ladies	2007–08	22	7	3	1	3	1	4	3	32	12
Blackburn Rovers Ladies	2008–09	16	7	3	1	2	3	4	0	25	11
Blackburn Rovers Ladies	2009–10	7	3	0	0	2	0	1	1	10	4
Blackburn Rovers Ladies	Club Total	45	17	6	2	7	4	9	4	67	27
