= 2006–07 FA Women's Premier League =

FA Women's Premier League
- Season: 2006–07

The 2006–07 FA Women's Premier League season was the 16th season of the FA Women's Premier League.

== National Division ==
FA Women's Premier League National Division
- Season: 2006–07
- Champions: Arsenal; 10th title
- Relegated: Sunderland; Fulham
- UEFA Cup: Arsenal; Everton; Cardiff City
- Matches: 132
- Goals: 527 (3.99 per match)
- Top goalscorer: Lianne Sanderson (29 goals)
- Biggest home win: Arsenal 14–0 Fulham (17 August 2006)
- Longest unbeaten run: Arsenal (22)

Locations of the FA Women's Premier League National Division Teams
Locations of the FA Women's Premier League National Division Teams (Greater London)

Changes from last season:

- Blackburn Rovers were promoted from the Northern Division
- Cardiff City were promoted from the Southern Division

=== Standings ===
Pos	Team	Pld	W	D	L	GF	GA	GD	Pts	Qualification or relegation
1	Arsenal (C)	22	22	0	0	119	10	+109	66	Qualification for the UEFA Cup qualifying round (Note: Because Arsenal won the 2006-07 European Cup, Everton qualified as League runner-up.)
2	Everton	22	17	1	4	56	15	+41	52	Qualification for the UEFA Cup qualifying round
3	Charlton Athletic	22	16	2	4	63	32	+31	50	
4	Bristol Academy	22	13	1	8	53	41	+12	40	
5	Leeds United	22	12	1	9	50	44	+6	37	
6	Blackburn Rovers	22	10	2	10	37	36	+1	32	
7	Birmingham City	22	8	4	10	34	29	+5	28	
8	Chelsea	22	8	4	10	33	34	−1	28	
9	Doncaster Rovers Belles	22	7	2	13	29	54	−25	23	
10	Cardiff City	22	3	3	16	26	64	−38	12	Qualification for the UEFA Cup qualifying round (Note: Qualified by winning the Welsh Women's Cup.)
11	Sunderland (R)	22	3	2	17	15	72	−57	11	Relegation to the Northern Division
12	Fulham (R)	22	1	2	19	12	96	−84	5	Relegation to the Southern Division

Source: FA WPL
(C) Champions; (R) Relegated

=== Results ===
Home \ Away	ARS	BIR	BLA	BRI	CAR	CHA	CHE	DON	EVE	FUL	LEE	SUN
Arsenal	—	1–0	4–0	4–1	4–0	3–0	3–1	7–0	3–2	14–0	6–0	6–0
Birmingham City	0–1	—	3–0	2–0	2–2	1–2	0–0	1–2	0–4	7–1	0–2	2–0
Blackburn Rovers	0–3	1–2	—	4–5	3–1	1–3	1–3	2–0	2–3	1–1	2–1	5–0
Bristol Academy	0–6	2–1	2–1	—	3–0	0–2	2–1	1–1	0–2	7–1	4–3	5–1
Cardiff City	1–6	1–1	0–2	0–3	—	0–3	1–3	1–5	0–3	7–0	0–5	1–1
Charlton Athletic	2–9	3–0	0–0	3–1	9–2	—	3–2	3–0	1–2	1–1	5–3	8–0
Chelsea	1–5	1–1	0–1	0–5	3–0	1–2	—	3–1	0–1	2–1	2–1	0–0
Doncaster Rovers Belles	0–4	0–2	1–3	2–5	2–3	2–4	1–1	—	2–1	3–1	2–5	2–1
Everton	1–4	2–1	1–0	3–0	2–0	0–1	4–0	3–0	—	9–0	1–1	5–0
Fulham	0–9	0–3	0–3	1–5	0–5	2–7	0–5	0–1	0–2	—	0–1	1–0
Leeds United	1–8	4–2	5–2	2–0	2–1	0–2	1–0	1–2	0–1	2–1	—	5–2
Sunderland	0–9	0–3	1–2	1–2	2–0	1–2	0–4	2–0	0–4	2–1	1–5	—

Source: FA WPL
Legend: Blue = home team win; Yellow = draw; Red = away team win.

=== Top scorers ===
Rank	Player	Team	Goals
1	(England) Lianne Sanderson	Arsenal	29
2	(England) Eniola Aluko	Charlton	19
2	(England) Kelly Smith	Arsenal	19
4	(England) Katie Anderton	Blackburn	17
5	(England) Kerry Bartlett	Bristol Rovers	16

== Northern Division ==
FA Women's Premier League Northern Division
- Season: 2007–08
- Champions: Liverpool
- Promoted: Liverpool
- Relegated: Wolverhampton Wanderers; Curzon Ashton
- Matches: 132
- Goals: 441 (3.34 per match)
- Biggest away win: Preston North End; 1–8 Lincoln City (24 September 2006)

Map showing the locations of the teams in the Northern Division of the FA Women's Premier League
Map showing the locations of the teams in the Northern Division of the FA Women's Premier League

Changes from last season:

- Blackburn Rovers were promoted to the National Division
- Preston North End were promoted from the Northern Combination League
- Crewe Alexandra were promoted from the Midland Combination League
- Middlesbrough were relegated to the Northern Combination League

=== League table ===
Pos	Team	Pld	W	D	L	GF	GA	GD	Pts	Promotion or relegation
1	Liverpool (C, P)	22	16	2	4	56	17	+39	50	Promotion to the National Division
2	Lincoln City	22	13	6	3	50	23	+27	45	
3	Nottingham Forest	22	11	3	8	41	36	+5	36	
4	Crewe Alexandra	22	10	4	8	33	38	−5	34	
5	Preston North End	22	9	6	7	36	41	−5	33	
6	Tranmere Rovers	22	9	4	9	41	34	+7	31	
7	Newcastle United	22	8	5	9	37	34	+3	29	
8	Stockport County	22	8	4	10	34	36	−2	28	
9	Aston Villa	22	6	6	10	36	43	−7	24	
10	Manchester City	22	6	6	10	27	35	−8	24	
11	Wolverhampton Wanderers (R)	22	5	6	11	26	44	−18	21	Relegation to the Midland Combination League
12	Curzon Ashton (R)	22	4	2	16	24	60	−36	14	Relegation to the Northern Combination League

Source: FA WPL
(C) Champions; (P) Promoted; (R) Relegated

=== Results ===
Home \ Away	ASV	CRW	CUA	LIC	LIV	MCI	NEU	NOF	PNE	STC	TRR	WOW
Aston Villa	—	1–1	1–0	0–0	1–1	1–0	1–2	1–3	1–1	1–0	1–2	3–3
Crewe Alexandra	3–2	—	1–0	1–2	0–4	3–0	2–1	4–3	0–0	3–4	3–3	2–0
Curzon Ashton	2–5	1–2	—	2–5	1–5	0–2	0–6	1–2	0–1	0–2	1–5	2–1
Lincoln City	4–1	2–1	4–0	—	0–0	1–1	2–2	2–0	3–4	1–0	2–3	1–0
Liverpool	2–4	5–0	3–1	1–3	—	1–0	2–0	1–0	1–0	4–0	3–1	5–0
Manchester City	3–2	2–1	1–1	1–1	1–0	—	1–2	1–2	1–1	0–1	3–3	1–3
Newcastle United	2–1	1–2	0–1	2–0	1–4	2–2	—	1–1	1–1	3–1	2–1	2–0
Nottingham Forest	4–3	3–0	4–1	0–3	2–3	2–3	3–2	—	1–1	2–1	3–1	1–2
Preston North End	2–1	2–0	6–3	1–8	1–3	2–1	4–2	2–0	—	1–1	0–5	3–4
Stockport County	6–1	0–1	2–2	1–2	0–3	0–1	4–3	1–1	2–1	—	1–2	3–3
Tranmere Rovers	0–2	0–1	1–2	2–2	1–0	4–1	1–0	1–2	3–1	1–2	—	1–1
Wolverhampton Wanderers	2–2	2–2	1–3	0–2	0–5	2–1	0–0	1–2	0–1	2–0	1–0	—

Source: FA WPL
Legend: Blue = home team win; Yellow = draw; Red = away team win.

== Southern Division ==
FA Women's Premier League Southern Division
- Season: 2006–07
- Champions: Watford
- Relegated: AFC Wimbledon; Southampton Saints
- Matches: 132
- Goals: 563 (4.27 per match)
- Biggest home win: Crystal Palace 12–0 Southampton Saints (1 April 2007)
- Biggest away win: Southampton Saints 0–12 Watford (6 May 2007)

Map showing the locations of the teams in the Southern Division of the FA Women's Premier League
Map showing the locations of the teams in the Southern Division of the FA Women's Premier League

Changes from last season:

- Cardiff City were promoted to the National Division
- Keynsham Town were promoted from the South West Combination League
- Barnet were promoted from the South East Combination League
- Langford were relegated to the South East Combination League
- Bristol City became AFC Team Bath

=== League table ===
Pos	Team	Pld	W	D	L	GF	GA	GD	Pts	Promotion or relegation
1	Watford (C, P)	22	19	0	3	99	35	+64	57	Promotion to the National Division
2	Portsmouth	22	14	5	3	60	32	+28	47	
3	Millwall Lionesses	22	13	3	6	61	35	+26	42	
4	Barnet	22	11	4	7	52	33	+19	37	
5	Keynsham Town	22	11	4	7	52	46	+6	37	
6	AFC Team Bath	22	9	5	8	44	37	+7	32	
7	Reading Royals	22	10	1	11	36	34	+2	31	
8	Crystal Palace	22	7	5	10	48	48	0	26	
9	Brighton & Hove Albion	22	7	2	13	39	65	−26	23	
10	West Ham United	22	6	3	13	25	44	−19	21	
11	AFC Wimbledon (R)	22	5	2	15	26	61	−35	17	Relegation to the South East Combination League
12	Southampton Saints (R)	22	1	4	17	21	93	−72	7	Relegation to the South West Combination League

Source: FA WPL
(C) Champions; (P) Promoted; (R) Relegated

=== Results ===
Home \ Away	WIM	BAR	BHA	CRP	KET	MIL	POR	REA	SOU	BAT	WAT	WHU
AFC Wimbledon	—	1–5	3–0	2–2	0–2	0–3	0–4	1–3	1–0	1–1	1–3	0–2
Barnet	1–2	—	3–1	3–1	3–3	2–1	1–2	2–1	4–0	3–1	2–3	4–1
Brighton & Hove Albion	2–1	3–4	—	3–1	1–5	0–3	0–3	2–1	4–2	0–2	3–4	1–2
Crystal Palace	2–4	2–1	1–1	—	6–3	4–3	1–1	0–1	12–0	2–2	1–5	3–0
Keynsham Town	3–1	1–1	1–4	1–0	—	1–3	1–0	5–1	3–0	2–2	2–1	4–1
Millwall Lionesses	5–1	1–3	4–0	6–2	3–3	—	1–2	0–1	6–2	5–2	4–3	0–2
Portsmouth	5–2	2–2	6–1	4–0	6–1	3–3	—	2–0	3–3	2–1	1–7	3–0
Reading Royals	2–1	2–0	6–3	4–0	0–1	1–2	1–2	—	2–2	0–1	1–5	3–1
Southampton Saints	1–2	0–7	4–4	0–4	3–1	1–4	0–2	0–3	—	1–1	0–12	0–1
AFC Team Bath	7–0	3–1	0–1	1–1	2–1	1–2	1–2	1–0	9–1	—	1–7	3–1
Watford	5–1	2–0	8–3	2–1	7–4	1–2	4–3	3–2	6–0	3–0	—	5–1
West Ham United	3–1	0–0	1–2	1–2	1–4	0–0	2–2	0–1	2–1	1–2	2–3	—

Source: FA WPL
Legend: Blue = home team win; Yellow = draw; Red = away team win.
