= Jade Radburn =

English footballer (born 1989)

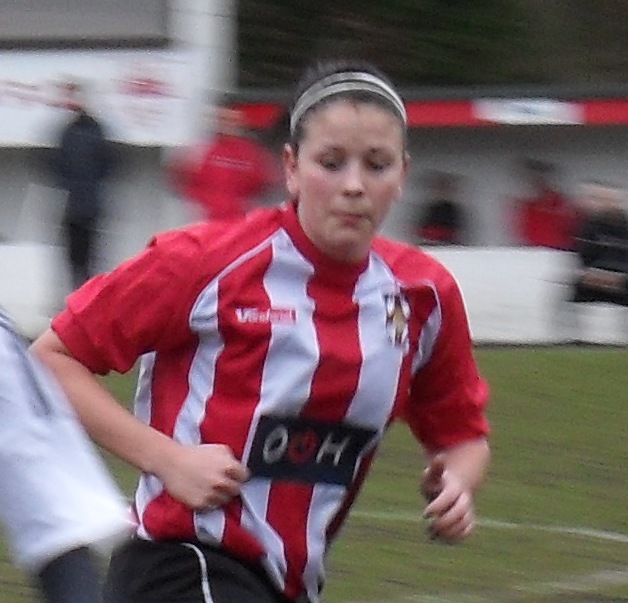

Personal information
- Full name: Jade Annmarie Radburn
- Date of birth: 21 January 1989 (age 37)
- Place of birth: Leicester, England
- Positions: Centre back; defensive midfielder

Team information
- Current team: Keynsham Town

Youth career
- Leicester City

Senior career*
Years	Team	Apps	(Gls)
2005–2009	Leicester City		
2009	Blackburn Rovers	6	(0)
2009–2010	OOH Lincoln	8	(1)
2010–2011	Keynsham Town		
2011	Bristol Academy	9	(0)
2012	Leicester City		
2012–2014	Yeovil Town		
2015	Doncaster Rovers Belles		
2015–	Keynsham Town	47	(10)
- * Club domestic league appearances and goals as of 20:15, 9 August 2019 (UTC)

Jade Annmarie Radburn (born 21 February 1989) is an English footballer who plays as a defender or midfielder for Keynsham Town.

== Club career ==
Radburn joined Leicester City Women at under-10 level and later spent three years with the first team, before joining Blackburn Rovers Ladies in the 2009 close season after a successful trial.

She moved to OOH Lincoln Ladies in November 2009. Radburn greatly impressed Lincoln manager Rod Wilson with her performances, both at centre-half and in midfield.

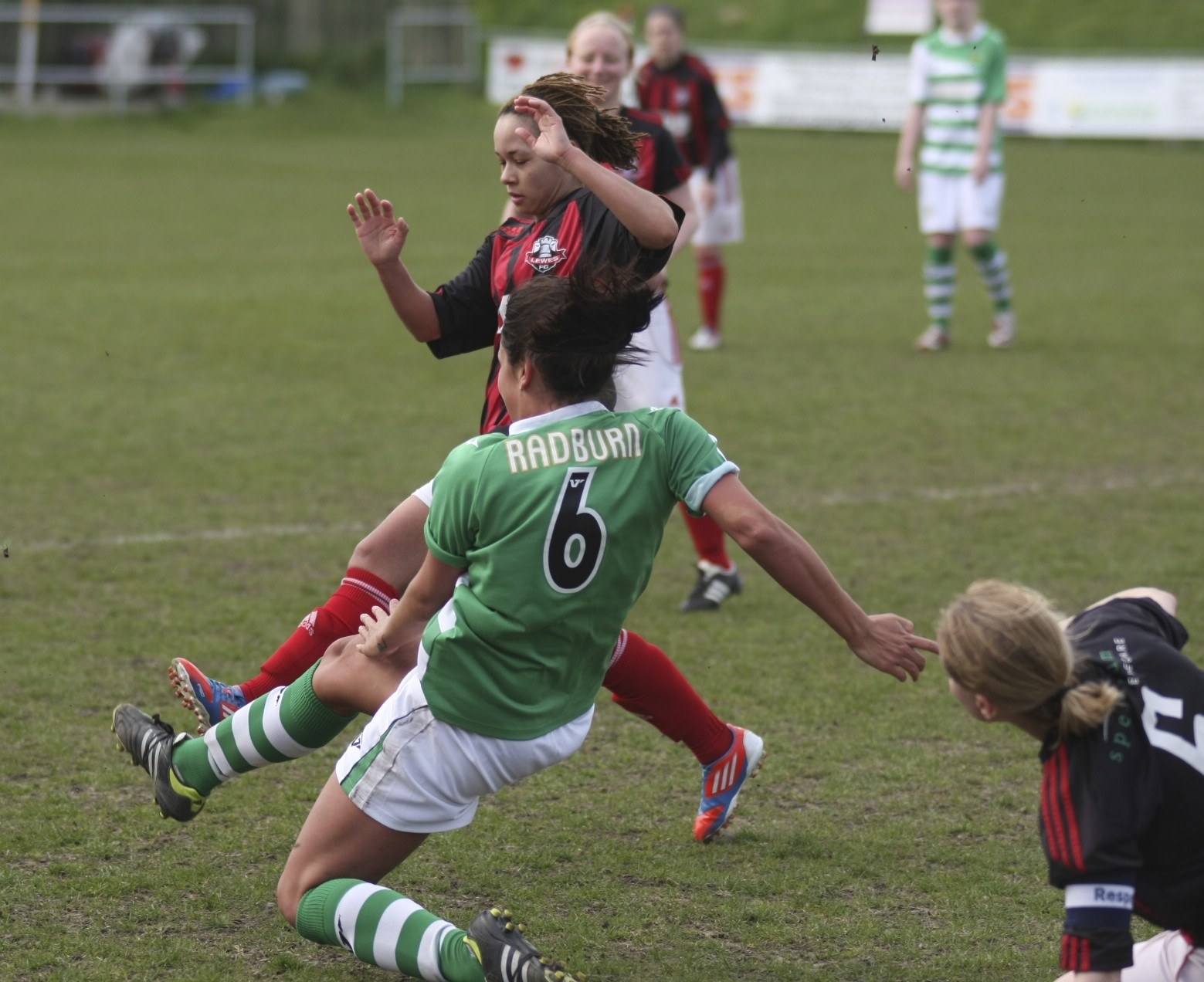
Radburn playing for Yeovil in April 2013

In October 2010 Radburn signed for Keynsham Town. She was then revealed as part of Bristol Academy's FA WSL squad in March 2011. Radburn made her WSL debut in a 0–0 draw at Everton, but was ineligible for Bristol's FA Women's Cup final defeat to Arsenal after playing for Keynsham in an earlier round of the competition. She was named in Bristol Academy's 2011–12 UEFA Women's Champions League squad in September 2011. In March 2012 it was reported that Radburn had rejoined Leicester City.

She signed for Doncaster Rovers Belles in July 2015, after leaving Yeovil Town Ladies and the end of the previous season. Promotion-chasing Belles manager Glen Harris praised Radburn's "strength and power". She scored a goal on her debut for the club, a header in a 5–0 win over Watford.

== International career ==
Radburn represented Great Britain at the World University Games, playing in the 2009 tournament in Belgrade and winning a bronze medal.

== Personal life ==
Radburn attended Loughborough University. In July 2013 Radburn married Yeovil teammate Justine Lorton.

== Blackburn Rovers statistics ==
Club	Season	League		WFA Cup		Premier League Cup		County Cup		Other		Total	
Club	Season	Apps	Goals	Apps	Goals	Apps	Goals	Apps	Goals	Apps	Goals	Apps	Goals
Blackburn Rovers Ladies	2009–10	6	0	0	0	2	0	1	0	0	0	9	0
Blackburn Rovers Ladies	Club Total	6	0	0	0	2	0	1	0	0	0	9	0
