= Lynda Shepherd =

English footballer

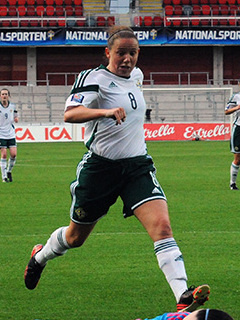

Personal information
- Date of birth: 5 May 1985 (age 41)
- Place of birth: Plymouth, England
- Position: Midfielder

Youth career
- 2002–2003: Manchester United
- 2003–2004: Stockport County

Senior career*
| Years | Team | Apps | (Gls) |
| 2004–2005 | Stockport County | | |
| 2005–2010 | Blackburn Rovers | 97 | (6) |
| 2010–2012 | Liverpool | 21 | (1) |
| 2010 | → Manchester City (loan) | | |
| 2012–2013 | Manchester City | | |
| 2014–2019 | Blackburn Rovers | 151 | (46) |

International career
| 2008 | England U23 | | |
| 2013–2014 | Northern Ireland | | |
- * Club domestic league appearances and goals

Lynda Shepherd (born 5 May 1985) is a retired football midfielder who played for FA Women's Premier League Northern Division club Blackburn Rovers L.F.C. She represented Northern Ireland at international level, after playing for England at under–21 and under–23 levels.

== Club career ==
Shepherd played for Manchester United Ladies before joining Stockport County Ladies. She joined Blackburn Rovers Ladies in July 2005.

Shepherd joined Liverpool ahead of the 2011 FA WSL season. She was loaned out to Manchester City in the meantime.

At the halfway point of the 2012 FA WSL, Liverpool were again rooted to the bottom of the table and sacked manager Robbie Johnson. Shepherd, Ruesha Littlejohn and Nicola Twohig were released by incoming manager Matt Beard. Later that month Shepherd signed for Manchester City.

== International career ==
Shepherd was first selected for England's under–21 team in July 2004, playing in the Nordic Cup. In 2006, Shepherd was named as a late replacement for the England Senior Team's training trip to La Manga Club. She later played for England at under–23 level. In February 2008 she scored for England U–23s against Germany, also in La Manga.

In 2013 Shepherd accepted a call–up to the senior Northern Ireland squad. She made her debut in a 5–1 hammering by the Republic of Ireland in the 2013 Cyprus Cup. At the same tournament Shepherd scored her first goal for the Irish, a consolation in a 2–1 defeat against South Africa.

== Blackburn statistics ==
To October 2009

| Club | Season | League | | WFA Cup | | Premier League Cup | | County Cup | | Other | | Total | |
| Club | Season | Apps | Goals | Apps | Goals | Apps | Goals | Apps | Goals | Apps | Goals | Apps | Goals |
|---|---|---|---|---|---|---|---|---|---|---|---|---|---|
| Blackburn Rovers Ladies | 2005–06 | | | | | | | | | | | | |
| Blackburn Rovers Ladies | 2006–07 | 20 | 0 | 4 | 0 | 2 | 0 | 3 | 2 | 0 | 0 | 29 | 2 |
| Blackburn Rovers Ladies | 2007–08 | 22 | 1 | 3 | 0 | 3 | 1 | 3 | 0 | 0 | 0 | 31 | 2 |
| Blackburn Rovers Ladies | 2008–09 | 20 | 3 | 3 | 0 | 2 | 0 | 4 | 0 | 0 | 0 | 29 | 1 |
| Blackburn Rovers Ladies | 2009–10 | 6 | 0 | 0 | 0 | 2 | 0 | 1 | 0 | 0 | 0 | 9 | 0 |
