= 2016–17 FA Women's Premier League Plate =

WPL Plate

Tournament details
- Country: England
- Teams: 34

Final positions
- Champions: Lewes
- Runners-up: Huddersfield Town

Tournament statistics
- Matches played: 31
- Goals scored: 151 (4.87 per match)
- All statistics correct as of 23 April 2017.

The 2016–17 FA Women's Premier League Plate is the third running of the competition, which began in 2014. It is the secondary League Cup competition run by the FA Women's Premier League (FA WPL), and is run in parallel with the league's primary League Cup competition, the Premier League Cup.

The teams that take part in the WPL plate are decided after the determining round of the WPL Cup. The winners of determining round matches continue in the WPL Cup, while the losers move into the WPL Plate.

All 72 Premier League clubs were included in the determining round draw, two of whom (Forest Green Rovers and Nuneaton Town) withdrew from the competition before playing a match, meaning 36 teams progressed in the Cup and 34 were entered in the Plate.

Reigning champions Coventry United, who beat Enfield Town 5–1 in the 2015–16 final, won their determining Round match this season, meaning that they did not defend their title.

== Results ==
All results listed are published by The Football Association. Games are listed by round in chronological order, and then in alphabetical order of the home team where matches were played simultaneously.

The division each team play in is indicated in brackets after their name: (S)=Southern Division; (N)=Northern Division; (SW1)=South West Division One; (SE1)=South East Division One; (M1)=Midlands Division One; (N1)=Northern Division One.

=== First round ===
Due to there being 34 teams in the competition, two first round matches are required to eliminate two teams and allow a full single-elimination knockout tournament to take place.

25 September 2016	Sporting Khalsa (M1)	2–6	Huddersfield Town (N)	Willenhall
14:00 BST (UTC+01:00)	Kelly	Report	Heckler 8', 40', 52'; Thomas 22'; Mallin 50', 71'	Stadium: Aspray Arena; Attendance: 30

25 September 2016	West Ham United (S)	2–2 (a.e.t.) (3–2 p)	Swindon Town (S)	Aveley
14:00 BST (UTC+01:00)	Gurr 45+1'; Burr 90+2'	Report	Walters 68', 80'	Stadium: Ship Lane; Attendance: 36

=== Second round ===
16 October 2016	Guiseley Vixens (N1)	4–4 (a.e.t.) (4–5 p)	Huddersfield Town (N)	Guiseley
14:00 BST (UTC+01:00)	Fuller 20'; McIver 70'; Brace 80'; 114' (o.g.)	Report	Hastings 2', 36'; Heckler 64', 95'	Stadium: Nethermoor Park; Attendance: 60

16 October 2016	Leicester City LFC (M1)	2–1	Steel City Wanderers (M1)	Leicester
14:00 BST (UTC+01:00)	Maslen	Report	Mawhood 16'	Stadium: Linwood Playing Fields; Attendance: 30

16 October 2016	Leicester City (N)	6–1	Rotherham United (M1)	Leicester
14:00 BST (UTC+01:00)	Robinson 21'; Rogers 70'; Hillier 73', 78'; Domingo 78'; Carnelly 88'	Report	Wild 70'	Stadium: Riverside Pavilion; Attendance: 84

16 October 2016	Mossley Hill (N1)	3–2	Loughborough Students (M1)	Liverpool
14:00 BST (UTC+01:00)	James 22'; Brodie 41', 61'	Report	Dassow; Gibson	Stadium: Mossley Hill Athletic Club; Attendance: 25

16 October 2016	Plymouth Argyle (SW1)	2–4	Luton Town (SE1)	Plymouth
14:00 BST (UTC+01:00)	Marks 62'; Brown 89'	Report	Bellinger; Henman	Stadium: University of St Mark & St John; Attendance: 63

16 October 2016	Solihull (M1)	0–2	Tranmere Rovers (N1)	Solihull
14:00 BST (UTC+01:00)		Report	Wood 39', 73'	Stadium: Field Lane; Attendance: 40

16 October 2016	St Nicholas (SW1)	7–2	Shanklin (SW1)	Yate
14:00 BST (UTC+01:00)	Arkell; Bennett; Morgan; Short	Report	Cooper; Rawlinson	Stadium: Lodge Road; Attendance: 76

16 October 2016	Crewe Alexandra (N1)	0–6	Bradford City (N)	Crewe
15:00 BST (UTC+01:00)		Report	Legge 22'; Stuart 28'; Sowerby 34'; Elford 42', 67'; Campbell 63'	Stadium: Cumberland Arena; Attendance: 37

23 October 2016	Actonians (SE1)	6–0	Ipswich Town (SE1)	Greenford
14:00 BST (UTC+01:00)	Barreca; Mulhern; Williams; Sooriyakumar	Report		Stadium: Berkeley Fields; Attendance: 25

23 October 2016	Birmingham & West Midlands (M1)	0–1	Radcliffe Olympic (M1)	Birmingham
14:00 BST (UTC+01:00)		Report	Jones	Stadium: Shenley Lane Community Sports Centre; Attendance: 15

23 October 2016	Cheltenham Town (SW1)	1–2	West Ham United (S)	Cheltenham
14:00 BST (UTC+01:00)	Fensome 65'	Report	Bottom 15' (pen.); Burr 89'	Stadium: Petersfield Park; Attendance: 103

23 October 2016	Exeter City (SW1)	0–4	Stevenage (SE1)	Exminster
14:00 BST (UTC+01:00)		Report	Breckenridge; McGuigan; Milliken; O'Connell	Stadium: Minster Park; Attendance: 25

23 October 2016	Lowestoft Town (SE1)	2–4	Queens Park Rangers (S)	Lowestoft
14:00 BST (UTC+01:00)	Moore 85'; Cursons 90'	Report	Denny 45+4', 90+3'; Treharne 54'; Ezzahiri 80'	Stadium: Crown Meadow; Attendance: 74

23 October 2016	Morecambe (N1)	0–5	Chorley (N1)	Lancaster
14:00 BST (UTC+01:00)		Report	Ball 8', 74', 84'; Coope 61'; Williams 70'	Stadium: Lancaster & Morecambe College; Attendance: 32

23 October 2016	Southampton Saints (SW1)	2–3	Keynsham Town (SW1)	Sholing
14:00 BST (UTC+01:00)	Matthews 27'; Eldridge 33'	Report	Alves 43'; Lorton 60'; Pratt 89'	Stadium: VT Group Sportsground; Attendance: 25

Walkover	Lewes (S)	H–W	Maidenhead United (SW1)	Lewes
		Report		Stadium: The Dripping Pan

=== Third round ===
6 November 2016	Actonians (SE1)	2–1	Queens Park Rangers (S)	Greenford
14:00 GMT (UTC+00:00)	Friel; Jung	Report	Ezzahiri	Stadium: Berkeley Fields; Attendance: 25

6 November 2016	Bradford City (N)	2–2 (a.e.t.) (3–4 p)	Huddersfield Town (N)	Bradford
14:00 GMT (UTC+00:00)	Sowerby 31'; Elford 44'	Report	Mallin 5', 39'	Stadium: Plumpton Park

6 November 2016	Chorley (N1)	3–5	Leicester City (N)	Leyland
14:00 GMT (UTC+00:00)	Reeves 4'; Cadwallader 24'; Higginson 81'	Report	Johnson 29'; Domingo 47', 87'; Greengrass 53'; Madden 66'	Stadium: Jim Fowler Memorial Fields; Attendance: 40

6 November 2016	Leicester City LFC (M1)	0–5	Radcliffe Olympic (M1)	Leicester
14:00 GMT (UTC+00:00)		Report	Evans 22', 67'; Saulter 32'; Ramadan 42', 55'	Stadium: Linwood Playing Fields; Attendance: 15

6 November 2016	Mossley Hill (N1)	1–2	Tranmere Rovers (N1)	Liverpool
14:00 GMT (UTC+00:00)	Brodie 48'	Report	Scheuber 7'; 13' (o.g.)	Stadium: Mossley Hill Athletic Club; Attendance: 20

6 November 2016	Stevenage (SE1)	0–2	Luton Town (SE1)	Hertford
14:00 GMT (UTC+00:00)		Report	McKay; Rutherford	Stadium: Hertingfordbury Park; Attendance: 33

6 November 2016	West Ham United (S)	2–3	Keynsham Town (SW1)	Aveley
14:00 GMT (UTC+00:00)	Locke 43'; Albuery 85'	Report	Alves 54'; Pearson 62'; Pratt 80'	Stadium: Ship Lane; Attendance: 43

Walkover	Lewes (S)	H–W	St Nicholas (SW1)	Brighton
		Report		Stadium: The Withdean Stadium

=== Quarter-finals ===
11 December 2016	Tranmere Rovers (N1)	0–7	Huddersfield Town (N)	Ellesmere Port
13:00 GMT (UTC+00:00)		Report	Heckler 25', 61', 69'; Mallin 33', 88'; Biglin 35'; Nutter 83'	Stadium: Ellesmere Port Sports Village 3G; Attendance: 35

11 December 2016	Keynsham Town (SW1)	2–3 (a.e.t.)	Leicester City (N)	Keynsham
13:30 GMT (UTC+00:00)		Report	Domingo 14', 33'; Cossens 115'	Stadium: AJN Stadium; Attendance: 65

11 December 2016	Actonians (SE1)	3–0	Radcliffe Olympic (M1)	Greenford
14:00 GMT (UTC+00:00)	Jung; Williams	Report		Stadium: Berkeley Fields; Attendance: 20

18 December 2016	Luton Town (SE1)	0–6	Lewes (S)	Luton
13:30 GMT (UTC+00:00)		Report	Palmer 13'; Bridges 47'; Carter 81', 90'; Stenning 83'; Kosky (o.g.)	Stadium: Stockwood Park Athletics Stadium; Attendance: 41

=== Semi-finals ===
5 March 2017
14:00 GMT (UTC+00:00)

Huddersfield Town (N)	6–1	Actonians (SE1)
Heckler 7', 17', 56'; Mallin 27'; Nutter 34'; Evans 74'	Report	Byrne 76'

The Stafflex Arena, Kirkburton
Attendance: 107
12 March 2017
14:00 GMT (UTC+00:00)

Leicester City (N)	0–1	Lewes (S)
	Report	Bridges 63'

Saffron Lane, Leicester
Attendance: 56

=== Final ===
23 April 2017
15:00 BST (UTC+01:00)

Huddersfield Town (N)	0–4	Lewes (S)
	Report Report	Bridges 6', 78'; Lane 59'; Palmer 85'

St. James Park, Brackley

Huddersfield Town	Lewes
