= Farley Way Stadium =

Association football stadium

Coordinates: 52°44′55.831″N 1°10′49.001″W

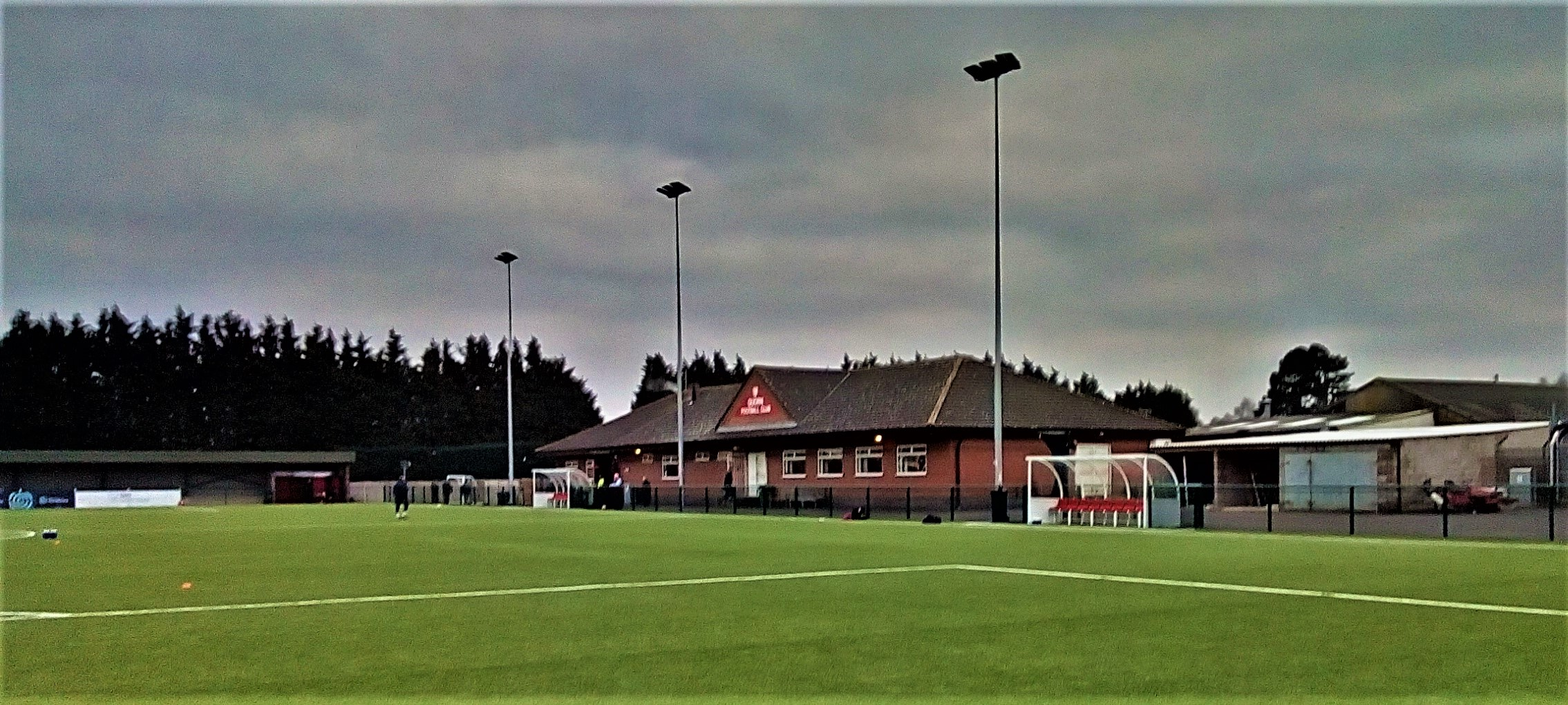
The Stadium in 2019

Farley Way Stadium is an association football stadium located in Quorn, Leicestershire, England. It is home to both Quorn F.C. of the Southern League Premier Division Central. Opened in 1994 the ground has a capacity of 1,400 and has a 400-seater cantilever stand running along one side of the pitch and a covered terrace at one end. It was renovated in 2018 with standing surfaces renewed, new perimeter fences put in and a new stand built. Running parallel to the main pitch is a full-length, slightly narrow, training pitch.
