= Will Radburn =

- Born: Will Radburn; November 21, 1991 (age 34) Solihull, England
- Height: 5 ft 10 in (178 cm)
- Weight: 100 kg (220 lb)
- School: Tudor Grange Academy, Solihull

Rugby union career
- Position: Hooker
- Current team: Birmingham & Solihull R.F.C.
Senior career
Years	Team	Apps	(Points)
2010-2012	Worcester Warriors	0	(0)
2011-2012	Birmingham & Solihull R.F.C. (loan)	9	(0)
2012-	Birmingham & Solihull R.F.C.	0	(0)
International career
Years	Team	Apps	(Points)
2008	England U16 A		

Will Radburn (born 21 November 1991) is an English rugby union footballer for Birmingham & Solihull R.F.C. His primary position is Hooker.

== Club career ==
A member of Worcester's academy set-up for several seasons, Radburn made his 1st team debut in the British and Irish Cup against Newport RFC in December 2010. He made a further two appearances in the competition against Bedford Blues and Plymouth Albion.

In the 2011–2012 season he was dual-registered with his former club Birmingham & Solihull R.F.C. and made his debut against Cinderford R.F.C. He also appeared off the bench for Worcester in an LV Cup fixture against Bath.

In June 2012 Radburn left Worcester and signed with The Bees as their youngest ever club captain.

== International career ==
In 2008 Radburn was selected as captain of the England U16 A team that competed in the Millfield International Festival.
