= Katie Anderton =

English footballer

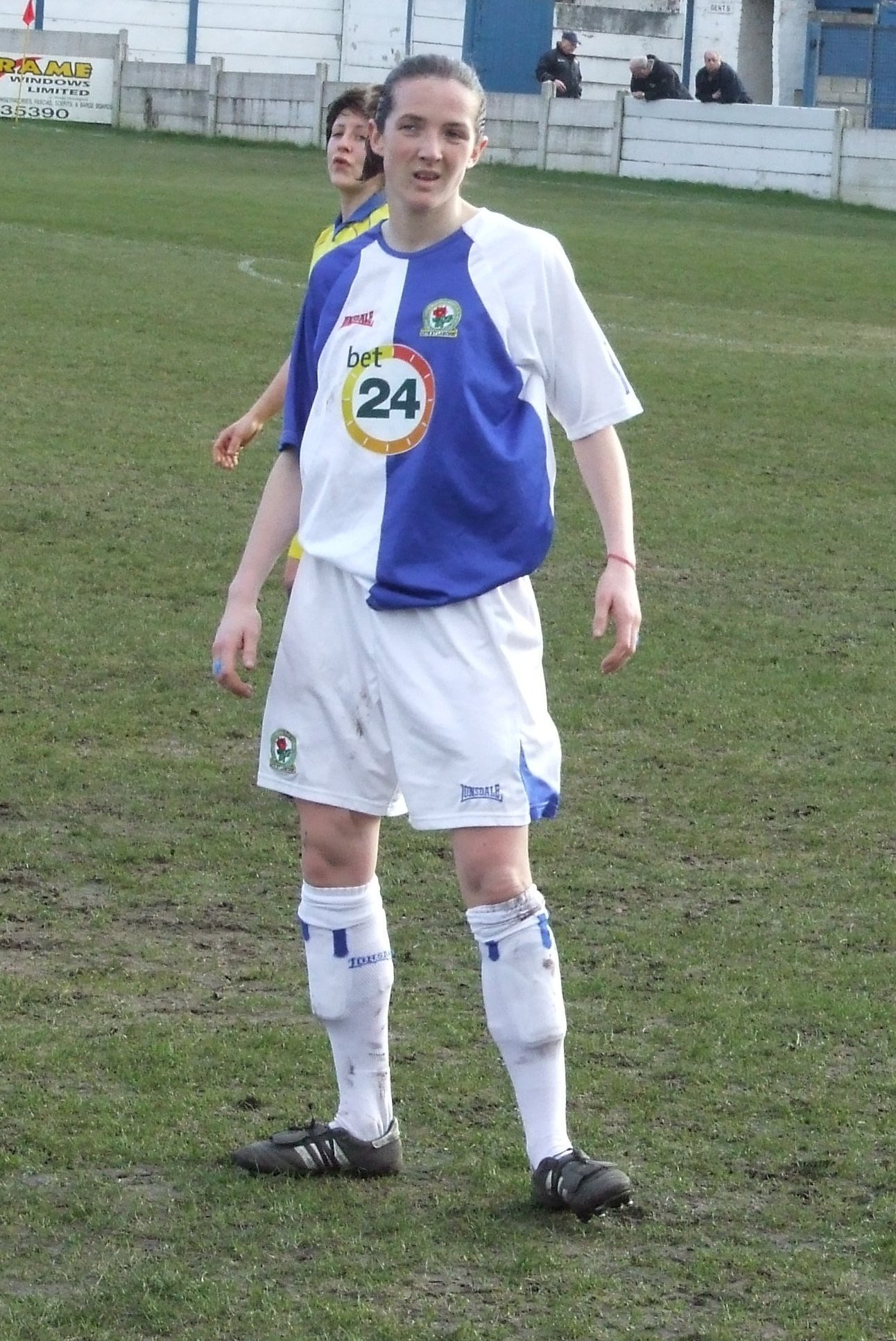
- Playing for Blackburn in 2006

Personal information
- Date of birth: 16 September 1983 (age 43)
- Place of birth: Preston, England
- Height: 5 ft 7 in (1.70 m)
- Position: Striker

Youth career
- Preston North End

Senior career*
| Years | Team | Apps | (Gls) |
| 1999–2003 | Tranmere Rovers | | |
| 2003–2010 | Blackburn Rovers | | |
| 2007 | → FC Indiana (loan) | | |
| 2011 | Doncaster Rovers Belles | 0 | (0) |
| 2011–2013 | Blackburn Rovers | | |
| 2013–2014 | Preston North End | | |
| 2014–2015 | Blackburn Rovers | | |
| 2015–2016 | Guiseley Vixens | | |
- * Club domestic league appearances and goals

Katie Anderton (born 16 September 1983) is an English football striker. Born in Preston, she represented Tranmere Rovers Ladies and spent several years with Blackburn Rovers Ladies before joining FA WSL club Doncaster Rovers Belles. After failing to make an appearance for Doncaster due to injury, Anderton returned to Blackburn in October 2011. She has represented England at junior level.

== Club career ==
Anderton began her career with Preston North End Girls, later joining Tranmere Rovers Ladies. In 2003, she joined Blackburn Rovers Ladies and has been one of the most prolific goalscorers in the club's history. She captained the team during the 2003–04 season, when Rovers won promotion to the FA Women's Premier League Northern Division for the first time. In 2006, Rovers were promoted to the FA Women's Premier League National Division.

In February 2007, Anderton signed a three-month deal to play for American Women's Premier Soccer League (WPSL) team FC Indiana started from May 2007, returning to the England in time for the start of the 2007–08 season. Indiana's coach Shek Borkowski already boasted a star-studded forward line, including Elena Danilova, Mónica Ocampo and Lauren Sesselmann.

Anderton reportedly signed for FA WSL club Doncaster Rovers Belles on 1 June 2010. However, she continued to play for Blackburn and when The Belles announced their final squad in February 2011 Anderton was not present. It was later reported that anterior cruciate ligament damage scuppered the transfer. Anderton eventually departed Rovers as a club legend and record goalscorer during the winter break of the 2010–11 campaign.

She joined Blackburn for a second spell in October 2011, scoring three goals from seven league starts from a deeper midfield role in 2011–12 season. In 2014 Anderton returned to Blackburn for a third spell, having spent part of the previous season with rivals Preston North End.

== International career ==
Anderton has represented England at Under-16 level, scoring for England against Scotland in 1999 in what was reported as the first ever female game to be played at Wembley. However, she suffered from homesickness and decided to quit international football aged 18 years. She was named in England coach Hope Powell's 30-player squad ahead of the 2007 FIFA Women's World Cup, but was one of the players to miss the cut when the final squad was announced. In January 2008 Anderton cited personal reasons for her late withdrawal from the England squad's annual training trip to La Manga Club.

Anderton has also represented Great Britain at the World University Games, playing in the 2009 tournament in Belgrade.

== Personal life ==
Anderton attended Corpus Christi High School before studying Leisure and Recreation on a scholarship at Preston College. She later attended the University of Bolton. Despite her long association with Blackburn Rovers Ladies, Anderton remains a Preston North End supporter. She wears the number 8 on her shirt, in homage to her girlhood hero, former men's footballer Paul Gascoigne.

== Statistics ==
| Club | Season | League | | FA Cup | | Premier League Cup | | County Cup | | Other | | Total | |
| Club | Season | Apps | Goals | Apps | Goals | Apps | Goals | Apps | Goals | Apps | Goals | Apps | Goals |
|---|---|---|---|---|---|---|---|---|---|---|---|---|---|
| Blackburn Rovers Ladies | 2006–07 | 22 | 18 | 4 | 6 | 2 | 4 | 3 | 8 | 0 | 0 | 31 | 36 |
| Blackburn Rovers Ladies | 2007–08 | 22 | 22 | 3 | 5 | 2 | 2 | 3 | 4 | 0 | 0 | 30 | 33 |
| Blackburn Rovers Ladies | 2008–09 | 20 | 12 | 3 | 1 | 2 | 5 | 4 | 5 | 0 | 0 | 29 | 23 |
| Blackburn Rovers Ladies | 2009–10 | 16 | 11 | 3 | 2 | 3 | 2 | 2 | 2 | 0 | 0 | 25 | 18 |
| Blackburn Rovers Ladies | 2010–11 | 8 | 0 | 0 | 0 | 3 | 1 | 1 | 2 | 0 | 0 | 12 | 3 |
| Blackburn Rovers Ladies | 2011–12 | 7 | 3 | 4 | 2 | 5 | 1 | 4 | 0 | 2 | 2 | 22 | 8 |
| Blackburn Rovers Ladies | 2012–13 | 10 | 4 | 0 | 0 | 4 | 3 | 3 | 5 | 0 | 0 | 17 | 12 |
