= 2007–08 FA Women's Premier League =

FA Women's Premier League
- Season: 2007–08

The 2007–08 FA Women's Premier League season (known as the FA Tesco Women's Premier League for sponsorship reasons) was the 17th season of the FA Women's Premier League, England's highest-tier women's association football league at that time.

== National Division ==
FA Women's Premier League National Division
- Season: 2007–08
- Dates: 16 Aug 2007–18 May 2008
- Champions: Arsenal
- Relegated: Cardiff City; Charlton Athletic
- UEFA Cup: Arsenal; Cardiff City
- Matches: 132
- Goals: 521 (3.95 per match)
- Top goalscorer: Lianne Sanderson (25)
- Biggest home win: ARS 9–0 CCY (11 Nov)
- Biggest away win: CHA 0–7 ARS (29 Nov)
- Highest scoring: ARS 9–0 CCY (27 Sep–14 May)
- Longest winning run: 17 - Arsenal (27 Sep–3 Apr)
- Longest unbeaten run: 22 - Arsenal (17 Aug–6 May)
- Longest winless run: 22 - Charlton Athletic (7 Oct–11 May)
- Longest losing run: 12 - Charlton Athletic (7 Oct–16 Dec)
- All statistics correct as of 18 May 2008.

Locations of the FA Women's Premier League National Division Teams
Locations of the FA Women's Premier League National Division Teams (Greater London)

Changes from last season:

- Liverpool were promoted from the Northern Division
- Watford were promoted from the Southern Division
- Sunderland were relegated to the Northern Division
- Fulham were relegated to the Southern Division

=== League table ===
Pos	Team	Pld	W	D	L	GF	GA	GD	Pts	Qualification or relegation
1	Arsenal (C)	22	20	2	0	85	15	+70	62	Qualification for the UEFA Cup qualifying round
2	Everton	22	18	3	1	69	14	+55	57	
3	Leeds United (Note: On 9 July 2008, the team announced they were changing their name to Leeds Carnegie Ladies F.C. This came to ensure all of the professional sports teams Leeds Met University were investing in carried the name of the university's sport department, Carnegie College (including Leeds Carnegie and Yorkshire Carnegie). On 8 July 2010 it was announced by Leeds United F.C. that to stop Leeds Carnegie Ladies from going out of existence the club would step in to provide funding again, bringing the club full circle back to Leeds United Ladies once more, a day under two years since the club was renamed Leeds Carnegie L.F.C.)	22	12	4	6	45	33	+12	40	
4	Bristol Academy	22	10	4	8	45	35	+10	34	
5	Chelsea	22	9	5	8	40	35	+5	32	
6	Doncaster Rovers Belles	22	8	5	9	44	42	+2	29	
7	Watford	22	9	2	11	53	52	+1	29	
8	Blackburn Rovers	22	8	4	10	50	45	+5	28	
9	Birmingham City	22	7	4	11	34	39	−5	25	
10	Liverpool	22	6	4	12	31	51	−20	22	
11	Cardiff City (R)	22	3	3	16	19	69	−50	12	Relegation to the Southern Division; Qualification for the UEFA Cup qualifying round (Note: Qualified by winning the Welsh Women's Cup.)
12	Charlton Athletic (R)	22	0	4	18	6	91	−85	4	Relegation to the Southern Division

Source: FA WPL
(C) Champions; (R) Relegated

=== Results ===
Home \ Away	ARS	BIR	BLA	BRI	CAR	CHA	CHE	DON	EVE	LEE	LIV	WAT
Arsenal	—	3–0	5–1	2–0	9–0	5–0	4–1	4–3	0–0	1–1	5–2	4–1
Birmingham City	0–3	—	1–0	1–1	2–1	6–1	1–3	3–3	1–1	2–3	1–2	2–3
Blackburn Rovers	1–3	4–1	—	1–3	6–0	6–0	1–2	3–2	0–2	2–1	2–3	4–2
Bristol Academy	0–1	2–1	2–2	—	4–1	7–0	2–2	0–1	1–3	0–0	4–3	2–0
Cardiff City	0–6	2–3	1–3	1–3	—	2–1	0–1	0–1	0–4	0–4	1–1	1–2
Charlton Athletic	0–7	0–4	0–5	0–3	0–4	—	0–0	1–1	0–6	0–5	1–1	0–6
Chelsea	0–3	0–1	1–1	3–4	5–0	4–0	—	3–4	1–2	1–2	4–1	4–3
Doncaster Rovers Belles	2–4	2–0	3–0	0–3	1–1	4–0	1–1	—	1–2	2–3	3–2	2–2
Everton	0–2	2–2	5–1	3–0	6–0	7–0	3–0	3–1	—	4–0	2–1	3–0
Leeds United	0–4	2–1	4–4	1–0	2–3	2–2	0–1	3–1	1–2	—	2–0	2–1
Liverpool	1–4	1–0	1–1	3–2	4–0	2–0	0–0	0–3	1–5	0–3	—	1–4
Watford	2–6	0–1	3–2	6–2	1–1	4–0	2–3	4–3	1–4	2–4	4–1	—

Source: FA WPL
Legend: Blue = home team win; Yellow = draw; Red = away team win.

=== Top scorers ===
As of match played on 18 May 2008

Rank	Player	Team	Goals
1	(England) Lianne Sanderson	Arsenal	25
2	(England) Katie Anderton	Blackburn	23
3	(Wales) Helen Lander	Watford	21
4	(England) Natasha Dowie	Everton	17
5	(England) Fara Williams	Everton	14

== Northern Division ==
FA Women's Premier League Northern Division
- Season: 2007–08
- Champions: Nottingham Forest
- Promoted: Nottingham Forest
- Relegated: Stockport County; Crewe Alexandra
- Matches: 132
- Goals: 539 (4.08 per match)
- Biggest home win: Nottingham Forest 7–0 Rotherham United (7 October 2007)

Map showing the locations of the teams in the Northern Division of the FA Women's Premier League
Map showing the locations of the teams in the Northern Division of the FA Women's Premier League

Changes from last season:

- Liverpool were promoted to the National Division
- Sheffield Wednesday were promoted from the Northern Combination League
- Rotherham United were promoted from the Midland Combination League
- Sunderland were relegated from the National Division
- Curzon Ashton were relegated to the Northern Combination League
- Wolverhampton Wanderers were relegated to the Midland Combination League

=== League table ===
Pos	Team	Pld	W	D	L	GF	GA	GD	Pts	Promotion or relegation
1	Nottingham Forest (C, P)	22	18	4	0	80	26	+54	58	Promotion to the National Division
2	Lincoln City	22	18	1	3	66	16	+50	55	
3	Sunderland	22	16	2	4	52	30	+22	50	
4	Newcastle United	22	10	3	9	58	46	+12	33	
5	Preston North End	22	10	1	11	39	39	0	31	
6	Sheffield Wednesday	22	8	2	12	38	48	−10	26	
7	Manchester City	22	7	4	11	29	41	−12	25	
8	Tranmere Rovers	22	7	3	12	36	57	−21	24	
9	Rotherham United	22	7	1	14	41	62	−21	22	
10	Aston Villa	22	6	3	13	49	59	−10	21	
11	Stockport County (R)	22	6	1	15	21	54	−33	19	Relegation to the Northern Combination League
12	Crewe Alexandra (R)	22	5	3	14	30	61	−31	18	Relegation to the Midland Combination League

Source: FA WPL
Rules for classification: 1) Points; 2) Goal difference; 3) Number of goals scored
(C) Champions; (P) Promoted; (R) Relegated

=== Results ===
Home \ Away	ASV	CWA	LIN	MCY	NEW	FOR	PNE	RUT	SWD	SPC	SAF	TRO
Aston Villa	—	2–2	1–2	1–1	2–3	2–6	2–1	1–3	4–2	1–2	2–4	5–2
Crewe Alexandra	1–5	—	1–5	2–5	3–5	0–7	2–1	2–1	2–2	4–0	1–3	2–2
Lincoln City	4–0	3–0	—	3–0	5–1	1–2	3–0	3–0	1–0	3–0	5–1	3–0
Manchester City	2–4	1–0	0–2	—	0–0	1–1	0–4	1–5	1–3	2–0	2–2	3–0
Newcastle United	3–2	6–1	1–4	3–0	—	1–3	1–3	3–1	2–4	2–2	1–2	4–1
Nottingham Forest	4–4	5–2	0–0	3–0	2–1	—	2–0	7–0	5–1	2–1	3–2	3–2
Preston North End	5–2	1–0	3–2	1–2	0–3	1–5	—	2–0	1–3	0–1	1–2	3–1
Rotherham United	3–2	0–2	1–2	3–2	3–6	3–6	3–3	—	2–1	1–6	1–3	3–4
Sheffield Wednesday	2–5	1–0	2–6	0–2	3–1	1–5	0–2	0–2	—	2–1	2–3	4–1
Stockport County	2–0	2–1	0–3	0–3	0–7	1–2	0–3	0–5	0–4	—	0–5	0–1
Sunderland	4–2	0–1	2–1	2–0	2–1	2–2	2–0	4–1	1–0	2–1	—	2–0
Tranmere Rovers	1–0	4–1	1–5	2–1	3–3	0–5	3–4	3–0	1–1	1–3	3–2	—

Source: FA WPL
Legend: Blue = home team win; Yellow = draw; Red = away team win.

== Southern Division ==
FA Women's Premier League Southern Division
- Season: 2007–08
- Champions: Fulham
- Promoted: Fulham
- Relegated: Team Bath; Reading Royals
- Matches: 132
- Goals: 586 (4.44 per match)
- Biggest home win: Fulham 14–0 Reading Royals (14 October 2007)
- Highest scoring: Reading Royals; 1–13 Keynsham Town (12 September 2007)

Map showing the locations of the teams in the Southern Division of the FA Women's Premier League
Map showing the locations of the teams in the Southern Division of the FA Women's Premier League

Changes from last season:

- Watford were promoted to the National Division
- Colchester United were promoted from the South East Combination League
- Newquay were promoted from the South West Combination League
- Fulham were relegated from the National Division
- AFC Wimbledon were relegated to the South East Combination League
- Southampton Saints were relegated to the South West Combination League

=== League table ===
Pos	Team	Pld	W	D	L	GF	GA	GD	Pts	Promotion or relegation
1	Fulham (C, P)	22	15	5	2	70	19	+51	50	Promoted to National Division
2	Millwall Lionesses	22	13	5	4	50	21	+29	44	
3	Barnet	22	13	4	5	61	21	+40	43	
4	Portsmouth	22	13	3	6	63	26	+37	42	
5	West Ham United	22	12	0	10	63	46	+17	36	
6	Crystal Palace	22	10	4	8	45	30	+15	34	
7	Colchester United	22	10	1	11	51	54	−3	31	
8	Keynsham Town	22	8	6	8	51	31	+20	30	
9	Newquay	22	9	2	11	50	45	+5	29	
10	Brighton & Hove Albion	22	6	2	14	35	57	−22	20	
11	Team Bath (R)	22	5	4	13	39	53	−14	19	Relegated to South West Combination League
12	Reading Royals (R)	22	0	0	22	8	183	−175	0	Relegated to South West Combination League

Source: FA WPL
Rules for classification: 1) Points; 2) Goal difference; 3) Number of goals scored
(C) Champions; (P) Promoted; (R) Relegated

=== Results ===
Home \ Away	BAR	BHA	COU	CPL	FUL	KTW	MIL	NEW	POR	TBL	RRL	WHU
Barnet	—	5–2	1–3	5–1	0–1	1–1	1–1	1–2	4–0	5–1	8–0	1–2
Brighton & Hove Albion	1–2	—	2–3	0–2	0–1	1–4	0–3	1–1	3–6	0–1	4–0	3–6
Colchester United	0–2	2–4	—	1–3	1–2	2–5	1–2	3–0	0–2	2–2	7–0	1–2
Crystal Palace	0–3	1–1	2–4	—	1–2	0–0	1–1	1–0	2–1	3–1	4–0	2–1
Fulham	3–0	6–0	2–3	2–1	—	1–1	2–2	2–1	1–1	3–0	14–0	3–2
Keynsham Town	1–1	1–2	1–3	2–2	1–2	—	0–2	0–3	1–1	4–1	8–0	0–2
Millwall Lionesses	0–0	3–0	2–3	1–2	1–1	0–2	—	2–0	3–2	4–2	6–0	2–1
Newquay	1–6	1–2	5–0	3–2	1–6	0–2	1–3	—	1–0	0–0	9–0	1–4
Portsmouth	1–2	3–0	4–1	0–3	1–1	3–1	2–1	3–0	—	5–0	10–0	2–0
Team Bath	0–4	2–3	2–4	1–0	1–1	2–1	0–2	3–5	1–1	—	5–2	0–1
Reading Royals	0–6	1–5	1–6	0–12	0–5	1–13	0–7	0–10	0–10	0–12	—	3–10
West Ham United	0–3	3–1	8–1	1–0	0–8	1–2	0–2	3–5	1–4	3–2	12–0	—

Source: FA WPL
Legend: Blue = home team win; Yellow = draw; Red = away team win.
