= Blackburn Rovers W.F.C. =

Coordinates: 53°43′40.321″N 2°40′18.941″W

- Full name: Blackburn Rovers Women Football Club
- Nicknames: Rovers; The Blue and Whites; The Riversiders
- Founded: 1991
- Ground: Shawbridge
- Capacity: 2,000
- Manager: Carmelo Ruggieri
- League: FA Women's National League Division One North
- 2025–26: FA Women's National League Division One North, 12th of 12 (relegated)
- Website: rovers.co.uk/women
Home colours	Away colours	Third colours

Blackburn Rovers Women Football Club is a women's football club based in Blackburn, Lancashire, England, that competes in the FA Women's National League Division One North, the fourth tier of English women's football. The club spent five seasons in the FA Women's Premier League National Division, the highest level of the women's game in England prior to the formation of the Women's Super League in 2011, from 2006 until their relegation at the end of the 2010–11 season. They declined to submit an application to become an inaugural member of the Women's Super League due to their reluctance to split the team from the men's. They have been affiliated with Blackburn Rovers as the women's division since their formation in 1991.

It was announced on 20 May 2025, after finishing tenth in the 2024–25 Women's Championship, one spot away from relegation to the FA Women's National League, that Blackburn had withdrawn from the Women's Championship, because the club owner was unwilling to meet the league's requirements on facilities, player welfare and staffing. On 4 June 2025, the club announced that The FA had decided that Blackburn would play in the FA Women’s National League Division One North for the 2025–26 season, dropping from the second to the fourth tier of English football.

== History ==
=== Early days ===
The ladies' club was formed in 1991 as part of Blackburn Rovers' community programme, and reached the Northern Combination Women's Football League in 1998. After a few years in mid-table, the club began to take off in 2002. They moved into their parent club's lavish training facility at Brockhall Village, England youth striker Katie Anderton arrived from Tranmere Rovers and manager Marek Walsh demoted himself in favour of 25-year-old coaching prodigy Andy McNally. In 2003–04 Rovers won the Northern Combination by winning every match, and also added the Lancashire County Cup. The following season they finished a creditable third in the Premier League Northern Division.

Prior to the 2005–06 campaign, Rovers signed England Under-21 players Kay Hawke from Curzon Ashton and Lynda Shepherd from Stockport County. The club then won the league by finishing undefeated, with a record 20 wins from 22 games. McNally won FA Manager of the Year award, the first person from outside the top-flight to do so, while during the season Lynda Shepherd was called into a training camp with the senior England squad.

=== Women's Premier League National Division ===
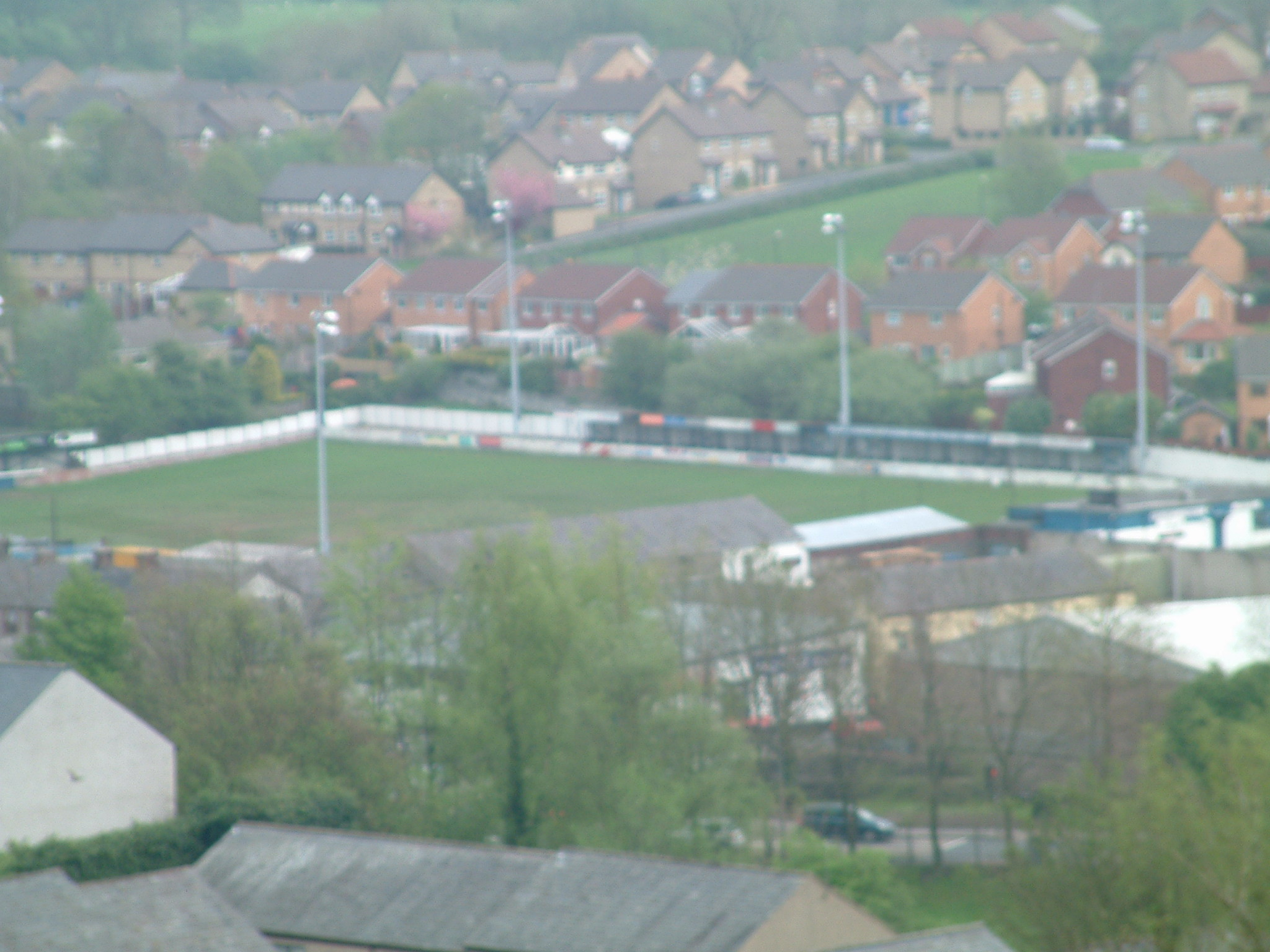
Clitheroe F.C. ground at Shawbridge

For the club's first season at the top-level, Rovers arranged to play their home games at Clitheroe FC's Shawbridge ground. The squad was strengthened with the signing of Leeds United full-back Mel Cook and England striker Amanda Barr, from Charlton Athletic.

In October 2006, the club lost 6–3 to Chelsea in the Premier League Cup amidst farcical scenes. The controversial performance of the 20-year-old referee saw him leave Shawbridge under police escort, while Andy McNally was sent-off and subsequently banned for a month by the FA for foul and abusive language. Despite several senior players demanding his return, McNally was suspended by his employers Blackburn Rovers before being replaced by Adam Lakeland in January 2007.

Although Amanda Barr also departed in January, to Leeds United, Blackburn rallied to finish in the top half of the table and reach the semi-final of the FA Women's Cup, where they lost 0–1 to Charlton Athletic. 34-goal striker Katie Anderton and goalkeeper Kay Hawke were both selected for the England squad at the end of the 2006–07 season. However, neither made the final 2007 World Cup squad. Anderton spent the summer playing in the United States, for FC Indiana.

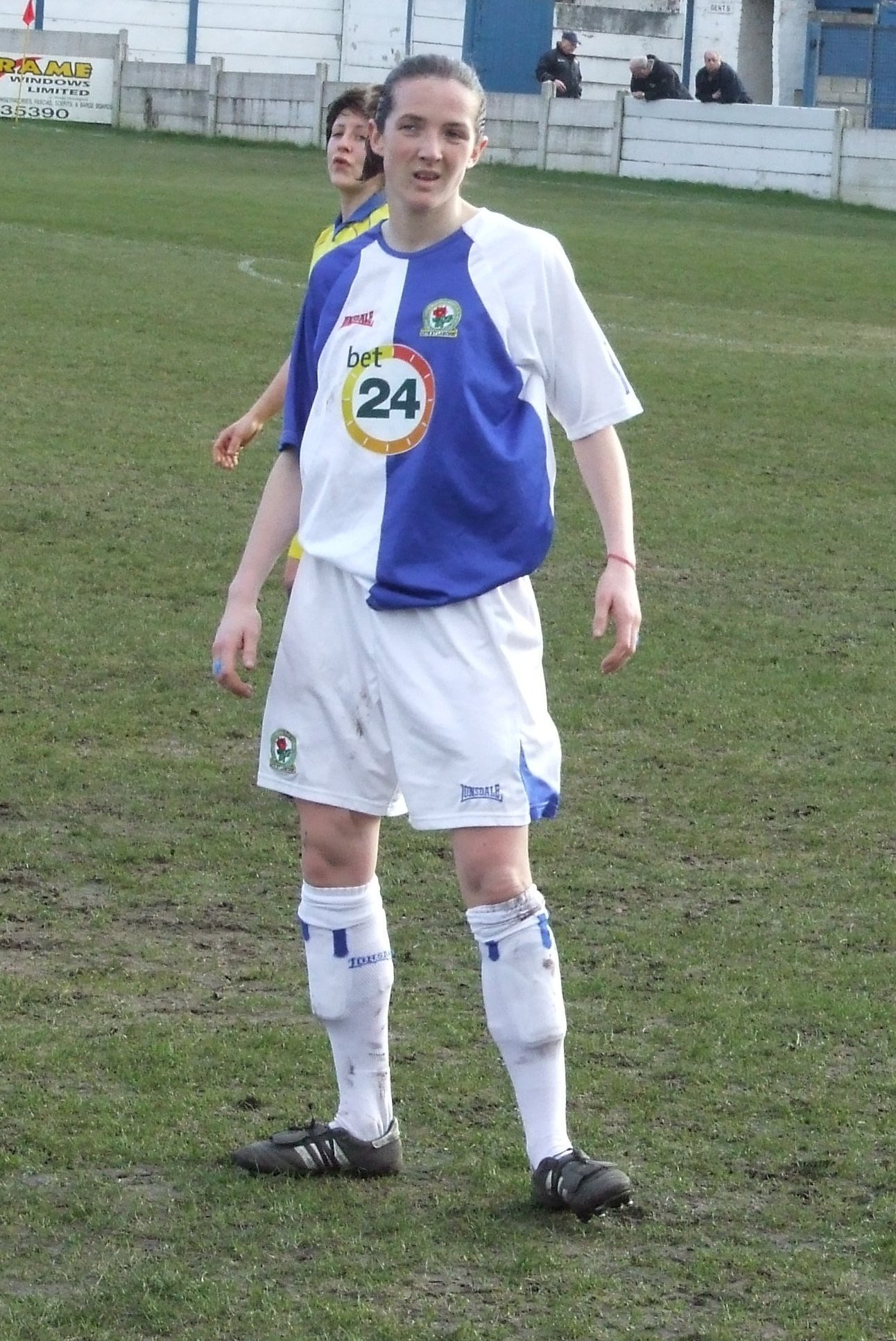
Record goalscorer Katie Anderton

Kay Hawke and Mel Cook signed for Lincoln City in August 2007, while former captain Anisha Bateman joined Preston North End. Lincoln goalkeeper Nicola Hobbs arrived as a replacement for Hawke. Rovers recruited several other new faces including international players Katie Williams, Michelle Walsh and Karen Burke. Natalie Preston was signed from Leeds United and captained the side in pre-season. A poor second half of the season saw Rovers finish eighth in 2007–08, while they were ejected from the FA Women's Cup by Lincoln at the quarter-final stage.

2008–09 proved no better as Rovers finished ninth and suffered a humiliating County Cup final defeat to Combination League Rochdale. Another aberrant refereeing performance in October 2008 saw four Blackburn players sent-off in a Premier League Cup defeat to Portsmouth, a scenario which manager Adam Lakeland described as "making a mockery of the women's game." In the summer of 2009, Rovers quit Shawbridge, citing the condition of the pitch as a contributing factor in their poor form. The club relocated to Stainton Park, the home of Radcliffe Borough FC, for the 2009–10 season, in which they finished seventh-placed in the Premier League National Division.

=== Super League ===
In January 2010, Blackburn and Watford were the only top-flight clubs who failed to apply for membership of the new FA Women's Super League. Blackburn had declined to submit an application due to their reluctance to separate from the men’s club. The club’s decision ultimately meant they would be playing in the level below the following season, which saw an exodus of the club’s top players, with Amy Kane and Danielle Hill returning to Everton, while Lynda Shepherd signed for Liverpool. Katie Anderton signed a Super League contract for Doncaster Rovers Belles but remained with Blackburn until the end of the season.

Although Blackburn intended to introduce young players to their squad, they also remained active in the transfer market. Defender Charlotte Farrell and Northern Irish international midfielder Kim Turner arrived from Manchester City and versatile Amanda Goodwin signed from Curzon Ashton. In April 2011, the club parted company with Adam Lakeland, shortly before their relegation into the Premier League Northern Division was confirmed.

== Players ==
=== Current squad ===
As of October 2026

Note: Flags indicate national team as defined under FIFA eligibility rules; some limited exceptions apply. Players may hold more than one non-FIFA nationality.

No.	Pos.	Nation	Player
1	GK	ENG	Cara Pestell
2	DF	ENG	Hannah Derbyshire
3	DF	ENG	Rebekah Coe
4	DF	ENG	Olivia Wilson
5	DF	ENG	Ellie Duffy
6	MF	ENG	Kennedy Owen
7	FW	AUS	Bonnie Davies
8	MF	ENG	Chloe Henderson
9	FW	ENG	Ella Ritchie
10	FW	HKG	Karri Chan
11	MF	ENG	Rachel Lawrence

No.	Pos.	Nation	Player
12	DF	ENG	Layla Grey
14	FW	ENG	Ellie Rice
15	MF	ENG	Ashley Tiripke
16	DF	ENG	Megan Searson
17	FW	ENG	Millie Fitzpatrick
18	DF	ENG	Olivia Cooke
19	FW	IRL	Rishona Dykes
21	GK	ENG	Amy Hood
22	DF	ENG	Isabelle Parish
24	GK	ENG	Jessica Cox
—	MF	ENG	Levi Rathburn

== Senior staff ==
As of 1 May 2026

Position	Staff
Head Coach	(England) Carmelo Ruggieri

== Honours ==
- FA Women's National League North (tier 2): 2005–06; (tier 3): 2016–17, 2017–18, 2018–19
- Northern Combination Women's Football League (tier 3): 2003–04
- FA Women's National League play-off (tier 3): 2018–19
- FA Women's National League Cup (tiers 3 and 4): 2017–18, 2018–19
- Lancashire FA Women's Challenge Cup: 2003–04, 2004–05, 2005–06, 2006–2007, 2007–2008, 2009–2010, 2010–11, 2011–12, 2014–15, 2015–16, 2016–17, 2017–18, 2018–19
