= Keynsham Town L.F.C. =

Coordinates: 51°25′10.15″N 2°30′26.39″W

Keynsham Town Ladies
- Full name: Keynsham Town Ladies Football Club
- Nickname: K's
- Founded: 1993 (as Super Strikers Girls)
- Ground: Crown Field, Keynsham
- Capacity: 3,001
- Manager: Justine Lorton (2026 - Present)
- League: FA Women's National League Division One South West
- 2025–26: FA Women's National League Division One South West, 9th of 12
Home colours	Away colours

Keynsham Town L.F.C. are an English women's football club affiliated with Keynsham Town F.C. and currently playing in the FA Women's National League Division One South West.

== History ==
The club was formed under the name Super Strikers Girls in 1993, as an U-11 six-a-side team, by pupils of Chandag Junior School. Over the next four years they were renamed Protel Super Strikers and adopted a green and white kit modelled on that of Celtic F.C.

In 1998 the club linked up with Keynsham Town F.C., became Keynsham Town Ladies, and entered a senior team in the South West Women's Football League Division Two.

The team progressed through the league, winning promotion to Division One (South) in 1998–99, to the Premier Division in 2001–02, to the South West Combination Women's league in 2003–04 having won the Premier Division title, and eventually to the FA Women's Premier League Southern Division in 2005–06, having won the South West Combination Women's league.

Historical photo of the main stand at the Crown Field

Due to the club's proximity to universities in Bath and Bristol, Keynsham Town Ladies were able to attract a number of international players to an increasingly cosmopolitan squad. When the club reached the quarter-finals of the Premier League Cup for the first time in 2009–10, the squad named for the 4–0 defeat to Arsenal contained nine different nationalities.

After the club's most successful league finish of third in 2009–10, manager Barrie Newton signed a number of prominent players, including Corinne Yorston (on loan from Bristol Academy), Suzanne Grant and Jade Radburn.

== Current squad ==
As of September 2026

Note: Flags indicate national team as defined under FIFA eligibility rules; some limited exceptions apply. Players may hold more than one non-FIFA nationality.

No.	Pos.	Nation	Player
1	GK	ENG	Lily L
1	GK	ENG	Emily Jones
1	GK	ENG	Xanna Kierk
2	DF	ENG	Lily Withers
3	DF	ENG	Amelie Collins
4	DF	ENG	Angharad Beman
5	DF	ENG	Emma Norris
6	DF	WAL	Holly Jenkins
7	FW	ENG	Vicky Vipond
8	FW	ENG	Brooke Stirrup
9	FW	ENG	Mia Mugford
11	MF	ENG	Lily Reed
12	MF	ARG	Fiore Martinez
14	MF	CAN	Ciera Lundy (captain)
15	FW	ENG	Abi Todd
16	MF	ENG	Jade Radburn
17	DF	WAL	Hannah Carpenter
18	FW	ENG	Emily Nicholson
19	DF	ENG	Mia Parkin
20	FW	ENG	Kerry Bartlett
21	DF	ENG	Liv Bees
22	FW	ENG	Immi Stocker
23	FW	USA	Sachi Kaneko-Grun
24	DF	ENG	Lucy Hilton-Jones

No.	Pos.	Nation	Player
25	DF	ENG	Nancy S
26	DF	ENG	Grace Finch
27	FW	ENG	Jenna Bakehouse
28	MF	ENG	Maddie Iles
30	DF	ENG	Lorna Coates
31	MF	ENG	Bella E
32	FW	ENG	Taz Dunne
33	DF	ENG	Freya D
34	MF	ENG	Gracie Reed
35	DF	ENG	Mandy Hennessy
36	FW	ENG	Tilly W
37	MF	ENG	Renee M
38	FW	ENG	Theonie E
39	FW	JAM	Alaiya B
40	MF	ENG	Freya Mist
41	MF	ENG	Lauren Wylie
42	FW	ENG	Rose T
43	MF	ENG	Nicky Heath
44	FW	USA	Mika Kaneko-Grun
45	DF	ENG	Harriet W
46	MF	ENG	Zoe Holden-Gray
47	FW	HUN	Lola K

=== Coaching staff ===
Name	Role
(England) Mark Ranahan	Chairman
(England) Barrie Newton	CEO
(England) Pamela Newton	Club Secretary
(England) Justine Lorton	First Team Manager
(England) Sven Kierk	First Team Coach
(Wales) Gwil Jenkins	DEVS A Team Manager/Coach
(England) Tim Dorey	DEVS A Team Coach
(England) Liam Jacques	GK Coach
(England) Emily Rose	Medic Lead
(England) Hannah Tubbs	Physio
