= 2018–19 Women's FA Cup =

Tournament details
- Country: England; Wales
- Teams: 293

Final positions
- Champions: Manchester City (2nd title)
- Runners-up: West Ham United

The 2018–19 Women's FA Cup (also known as the SSE Women's FA Cup for sponsorship reasons) was the 49th staging of the Women's FA Cup, a knockout cup competition for women's football teams in England. Chelsea were the defending champions, having beaten Arsenal 3–1 in the previous final.

== Teams ==
A total of 293 teams had their entries to the tournament accepted by The Football Association. 199 teams entered in the preliminary round or first round qualifying. Teams that played in the FA Women's National League Division One were given exemption to the second round qualifying, while teams in the Northern and Southern Premier Divisions entered in the second round proper. Teams in the FA Women's Super League and FA Women's Championship were exempted to the fourth round proper.

| Round | Clubs remaining | Clubs involved | Winners from previous round | Games played | Goals scored | Prize money |
|---|---|---|---|---|---|---|
| Preliminary round | 293 | 106 | — | 46 | 222 | £325 |
| First round qualifying | 240 | 146 | 53 | 67 | 373 | £375 |
| Second round qualifying | 167 | 120 | 73 | 59 | 338 | £450 |
| Third round qualifying | 107 | 60 | 60 | 30 | 139 | £600 |
| First round | 77 | 30 | 30 | 15 | 60 | £850 |
| Second round | 62 | 40 | 15 | 20 | 81 | £900 |
| Third round | 42 | 20 | 20 | 10 | 39 | £1,000 |
| Fourth round | 32 | 32 | 10 | 16 | 64 | £2,000 |
| Fifth round | 16 | 16 | 16 | 8 | 31 | £3,000 |
| Quarter-Final | 8 | 8 | 8 | | | £4,000 |
| Semi-Final | 4 | 4 | 4 | | | £5,000 |
| Final | 2 | 2 | 2 | | | £15,000 (runners-up) £25,000 (winners) |

The preliminary round saw six ties cancelled due to the withdrawal of one of the teams with one additional tie cancelled due to Woodley United not being able to field a team. The first round qualifying saw five ties cancelled as a result of withdrawals with one additional tie cancelled due to the disqualification of Wealdstone. The second round qualifying saw one tie cancelled due to the withdrawal of St Nicholas.

== Preliminary round ==
There was no preliminary round in the original schedule of the competition. It was added by The Football Association as a result of increased entries into the competition. Fifty three matches were scheduled for the preliminary round, to be played by Sunday 26 August 2018. The first match was played on Friday 17 August 2018, with six more on Sunday 19 August 2018. One match was postponed from 26 August 2018, with another abandoned and replayed the following Sunday.

| Tie | Home team (tier) | Score | Away team (tier) | Att. |
|---|---|---|---|---|
| 1 | Lumley (7) | 0–2 | Boro Rangers (6) | 41 |
| 2 | Workington Reds (6) | 1–3 | Carlisle United (6) | |
| 3 | Durham Cestria (5) | 3–0 | South Shields (5) | |
| 4 | Altofts (6) | 0–1 (a.e.t.) | Tingley Athletic (7) | |
| 5 | Rotherham United (5) | 14–0 | Bradford Park Avenue (7) | |
| 6 | Dronfield Town (7) | 0–8 | Ossett United (6) | |
| 7 | Hepworth United (7) | 0–4 | Chesterfield (7) | |
| 8 | Bridlington Rovers (7) | H–W | Leeds Medics & Dentists (7) | |
| 9 | Manchester Stingers (5) | 3–1 | Merseyrail Bootle (5) | |
| 10 | Tranmere Rovers (5) | 7–0 | Chester (6) | |
| 11 | Wythenshawe Amateurs (6) | 5–1 | Accrington Stanley Community Trust (7) | |
| 12 | FC United of Manchester (5) | H–W | Blackburn Community Sports Club (6) | |
| 13 | Bury (6) | 3–3 (3–0 p) | Mossley Hill (5) | |
| 14 | Burscough Dynamo (6) | 3–3 (3–2 p) | Fleetwood Town Wrens (5) | |
| 15 | Oadby & Wigston (6) | 6–0 | Sherwood (7) | |
| 16 | Mansfield Town (5) | 3–2 (a.e.t.) | Hykeham Town (6) | |
| 17 | Lincoln Moorlands Railway (6) | 1–3 | Loughborough Students (5) | |
| 18 | Leek Town (6) | 3–0 | Wyrley (6) | |
| 19 | Goldenhill Wanderers (5) | 0–2 (a.e.t.) | Sutton Coldfield Town (5) | 230 |
| 20 | AFC Telford United (6) | 0–2 | Kidderminster Harriers (6) | 112 |
| 21 | Rugby Town (6) | 2–1 | Knowle (5) | |
| 22 | Crusaders (5) | 4–2 | Coundon Court (5) | |
| 23 | Shifnal Town (6) | 1–0 | Sedgley & Gornal United (6) | |
| 24 | Droitwich Spa (6) | 1–2 | Stockingford AA Pavilion (5) | |
| 25 | Wymondham Town (5) | H–W | Moulton (7) | |
| 26 | Newmarket Town (6) | 0–2 | Cambridge City (5) | |
| 27 | St Ives Town (6) | 1–0 (a.e.t.) | Corby Town (6) | |

| Tie | Home team (tier) | Score | Away team (tier) | Att. |
|---|---|---|---|---|
| 28 | Frontiers (7) | 0–4 | Brentwood Town (5) | |
| 29 | Beccles Town (7) | 0–1 | Chelmsford City (7) | |
| 30 | Colney Heath (5) | 7–0 | Hemel Hempstead Town (7) | |
| 31 | Royston Town (5) | 7–1 | Hertford Town (6) | |
| 32 | Queens Park Rangers Girls (5) | H–W | Barton United (7) | |
| 33 | Wantage Town (7) | 2–2 (0–3 p) | Wycombe Wanderers (6) | 39 |
| 34 | Brentford (7) | 1–2 | New London Lionesses (6) | |
| 35 | Woodley United (5) | A–W | Abingdon United (6) | |
| 36 | Ashford Ladies (6) | 4–3 | Eastbourne Town (5) | |
| 37 | Regents Park Rangers (6) | H–W | Carshalton Athletic (5) | |
| 38 | Kent Football United (5) | 8–0 | Herne Bay (7) | |
| 39 | Eastbourne (6) | 1–2 | Aylesford (5) | |
| 40 | Sutton United (7) | 1–2 | AFC Phoenix (5) | |
| 41 | Newhaven (6) | 6–3 | Parkwood Rangers (5) | |
| 42 | Oakwood (7) | 0–4 | Islington Borough (7) | |
| 43 | Saltdean (6) | 4–1 | Steyning Town (7) | |
| 44 | London Kent Football United (5) | 11–0 | Tonbridge Angels (7) | |
| 45 | Margate (7) | 2–5 | Thamesview (7) | |
| 46 | Moneyfields (6) | A–W (Note: Moneyfields won the game 5–0 before being removed from the competition.) | Swindon Spitfires (6) | |
| 47 | Winchester City Flyers (5) | 0–2 | Southampton (5) | |
| 48 | Warsash Wasps (5) | 5–1 (Note: Replayed after original match abandoned due to a waterlogged pitch.) | Bournemouth Sports (7) | |
| 49 | Callington Town (5) | 2–5 | Exeter City (5) | |
| 50 | Marine Academy Plymouth (5) | 8–0 | Purnell Sports (7) | |
| 51 | Bideford (6) | 0–4 | Portishead Town (5) | |
| 52 | Exeter & Tedburn Rangers (6) | H–W | Forest Green Rovers (5) | |
| 53 | Chipping Sodbury Town (7) | 1–2 | Downend Flyers (5) | |

== First round qualifying ==
Seventy three matches were scheduled for the first qualifying round. The 146 teams taking part consisted of 93 teams with a bye to this stage, plus 53 match winners from the previous round. Matches were played on the scheduled date of Sunday 2 September 2018, except two delays caused by matches from the previous round not yet having taken place and Swindon Spitfires v Southampton FC Women delayed due to the removal of Moneyfields from the competition.

| Tie | Home team (tier) | Score | Away team (tier) | Att. |
|---|---|---|---|---|
| 1 | South Park Rangers (7) | A–W | Redcar Town (6) | |
| 2 | Durham Cestria (5) | 1–2 | Alnwick Town (6) | |
| 3 | Boro Rangers (6) | 8–1 | Cramlington United (6) | |
| 4 | Washington (6) | 2–4 | Hartlepool United (5) | |
| 5 | Carlisle United (6) | 1–2 | Bishop Auckland (7) | |
| 6 | Penrith (5) | 5–1 | Wallsend Boys Club (5) | |
| 7 | Wakefield (6) | 0–4 | Sheffield Wednesday (6) | |
| 8 | Ossett United (6) | 1–2 | Farsley Celtic (5) | 103 |
| 9 | Tingley Athletic (7) | 4–0 | Harrogate Town (5) | |
| 10 | Oughtibridge War Memorial (5) | H–W | Malet Lambert (7) | |
| 11 | Rotherham United (5) | 1–3 | Bridlington Rovers (7) | |
| 12 | Chesterfield (7) | 4–0 | Yorkshire Amateur (7) | 73 |
| 13 | Warrington Wolverines (6) | 1–4 | Stockport County (5) | |
| 14 | Wythenshawe Amateurs (6) | 1–3 | Accrington Girls & Ladies (5) | |
| 15 | Manchester Stingers (5) | 2–5 | West Didsbury & Chorlton (6) | |
| 16 | Cammell Laird 1907 (6) | 4–0 | Burscough Dynamo (6) | |
| 17 | Tranmere Rovers (5) | 6–3 | Bury (6) | |
| 18 | FC United of Manchester (5) | 6–0 | Didsbury (6) | 110 |
| 19 | Leicester City Women Development (5) | 15–0 | Coalville Town Ravenettes (7) | |
| 20 | Oadby & Wigston (6) | 4–2 | Mansfield Town (5) | 88 |
| 21 | Grimsby Borough (6) | 1–4 | Boston United (6) | |
| 22 | Loughborough Students (5) | 5–1 | Rise Park (5) | |
| 23 | Leicester City Ladies (5) | 2–5 | Lutterworth Athletic (6) | 45 |
| 24 | Stockingford AA Pavilion (5) | 2–0 | Lye Town (5) | 98 |
| 25 | Stourbridge (6) | 1–2 | Solihull United (6) | 100 |
| 26 | St Johns (7) | 5–4 (a.e.t.) | Sandwell (6) | |
| 27 | Shifnal Town (6) | 0–7 | Leafield Athletic (5) | |
| 28 | Leek Town (6) | 1–2 | Sutton Coldfield Town (5) | |
| 29 | Hereford Lads Club (7) | 0–9 | Kidderminster Harriers (6) | |
| 30 | Rugby Town (6) | 5–1 | Shenstone (7) | |
| 31 | Redditch United (5) | 0–3 | Kingfisher (6) | |
| 32 | Crusaders (5) | 5–0 | Solihull Sporting (6) | |
| 33 | Peterborough Northern Star (5) | 4–4 (3–1 p) | Northampton Town (6) | |
| 34 | St Ives Town (6) | 1–2 | Peterborough United (5) | |

| Tie | Home team (tier) | Score | Away team (tier) | Att. |
|---|---|---|---|---|
| 35 | Wymondham Town (5) | H–W | Roade (7) | |
| 36 | Kettering Town (5) | 1–3 | Acle United (5) | 25 |
| 37 | Cambridge City (5) | 14–0 | Riverside (7) | |
| 38 | Histon (6) | 2–1 | Thrapston Town (6) | |
| 39 | Leigh Ramblers (7) | 2–0 | Bowers & Pitsea (6) | |
| 40 | Corringham Cosmos (7) | H–W | Bungay Town (7) | |
| 41 | Brentwood Town (5) | 1–2 | Harlow Town (5) | |
| 42 | Chelmsford City (7) | 0–1 | AFC Sudbury (5) | 55 |
| 43 | AFC Dunstable (5) | 5–0 | Watford Ladies Development (6) | 30 |
| 44 | Bishop's Stortford (6) | 0–11 | Royston Town (5) | |
| 45 | Colney Heath (5) | 2–0 | Houghton Athletic (7) | |
| 46 | Ashford Town (Middx) (6) | 15–0 | Wargrave (6) | |
| 47 | New London Lionesses (6) | 4–0 | Hampton & Richmond Borough (7) | |
| 48 | Queens Park Rangers Girls (5) | H–W (Note: Wealdstone disqualified for not meeting the eligibility criteria for the competition.) | Wealdstone (8) | |
| 49 | Sandhurst Town (6) | A–W | Newbury (5) | |
| 50 | Wycombe Wanderers (6) | 1–3 | Ascot United (5) | |
| 51 | Abingdon United (6) | 1–3 | Oxford City (5) | |
| 52 | Newhaven (6) | 2–1 | Ashford Ladies (6) | 112 |
| 53 | London Kent Football United (5) | 1–2 | Godalming Town (6) | |
| 54 | Hassocks (7) | 2–4 | Islington Borough (7) | |
| 55 | Meridian (6) | 1–4 | Worthing (6) | 20 |
| 56 | Regents Park Rangers (6) | 3–4 | Whyteleafe (5) | |
| 57 | Kent Football United (5) | 8–0 | Victoire (6) | |
| 58 | Burgess Hill Town (7) | 9–2 | Thamesview (7) | |
| 59 | Abbey Rangers (7) | 2–1 (a.e.t.) | Saltdean (6) | |
| 60 | AFC Phoenix (5) | 5–0 | Phoenix Sports (6) | |
| 61 | Aylesford (5) | 1–3 | Fulham (5) | |
| 62 | Basingstoke Town (6) | 0–13 | AFC Bournemouth (5) | 15 |
| 63 | Swindon Spitfires (6) | 0–6 | Southampton (5) | |
| 64 | Shanklin (6) | 0–3 | New Milton Town (5) | 38 |
| 65 | Warsash Wasps (5) | 3–1 | Royal Wootton Bassett Town (6) | |
| 66 | Alton (6) | 0–2 | Eastleigh (6) | |
| 67 | Frampton Rangers (6) | 4–3 | Feniton (6) | |
| 68 | Exeter City (5) | 5–0 | Frome Town (7) | 55 |
| 69 | Ilminster Town (5) | 4–0 | Middlezoy Rovers (5) | |
| 70 | Marine Academy Plymouth (5) | 13–1 | Exeter & Tedburn Rangers (6) | |
| 71 | Portishead Town (5) | 2–1 | Downend Flyers (5) | |
| 72 | St Agnes (6) | 1–3 | Keynsham Town Development (5) | |
| 73 | Torquay United (5) | 1–2 | Weston Super Mare (6) | 50 |

== Second round qualifying ==
Sixty matches were scheduled for the second qualifying round. The 120 teams taking part consisted of 47 FA Women's National League Division One teams exempted to this stage, plus the 73 match winners from the previous round. Most matches were played on Sunday 23 September, except seven which were postponed to the following week.

| Tie | Home team (tier) | Score | Away team (tier) | Att. |
|---|---|---|---|---|
| 1 | Steel City Wanderers (4) | 1–8 | Chester Le Street Town (4) | |
| 2 | Cammell Laird 1907 (6) | 1–3 | Crewe Alexandra (4) | |
| 3 | Morecambe (4) | 1–5 | Norton & Stockton Ancients (4) | |
| 4 | Redcar Town (6) | 6–2 | Sheffield Wednesday (6) | |
| 5 | Bishop Auckland (7) | 0–8 | Stockport County (5) | 110 |
| 6 | Tingley Athletic (7) | 0–5 | West Didsbury & Chorlton (6) | |
| 7 | Bridlington Rovers (7) | 4–1 | Accrington Girls & Ladies (5) | |
| 8 | Brighouse Town (4) | 5–0 | Penrith (5) | |
| 9 | Oughtibridge War Memorial (5) | 0–4 | FC United of Manchester (5) | 149 |
| 10 | Bolton Wanderers (4) | 3–0 | Hartlepool United (5) | |
| 11 | Barnsley (4) | 2–3 (a.e.t.) | Newcastle United (4) | |
| 12 | Tranmere Rovers (5) | 0–1 | Boro Rangers (6) | 60 |
| 13 | Burnley (4) | 3–2 | Liverpool Feds (4) | |
| 14 | Alnwick Town (6) | 2–3 | Leeds United (4) | |
| 15 | Chorley (4) | 5–0 | Farsley Celtic (5) | |
| 16 | Oadby & Wigston (6) | 2–0 | Sutton Coldfield Town (5) | 64 |
| 17 | Crusaders (5) | 0–2 | Sporting Khalsa (4) | |
| 18 | Rugby Town (6) | 0–10 | West Bromwich Albion (4) | |
| 19 | Long Eaton United (4) | 7–1 | The New Saints (4) | |
| 20 | Chesterfield (7) | 1–0 | Burton Albion (4) | 90 |
| 21 | Leicester City Women Development (5) | 6–3 | Solihull United (6) | |
| 22 | St Johns (7) | 1–4 | Kidderminster Harriers (6) | |
| 23 | Wolverhampton Wanderers (4) | 6–0 | Kingfisher (6) | 75 |
| 24 | Bedworth United (4) | 0–2 | Birmingham & West Midlands (4) | |
| 25 | Leafield Athletic (5) | 0–0 (4–2 p) | Lutterworth Athletic (6) | |
| 26 | Stockingford AA Pavilion (5) | 1–2 | Nettleham (4) | |
| 27 | Solihull Moors (4) | 3–2 (a.e.t.) | Loughborough Students (5) | |

| Tie | Home team (tier) | Score | Away team (tier) | Att. |
|---|---|---|---|---|
| 28 | Billericay Town (4) | 9–1 | Colney Heath (5) | |
| 29 | Wymondham Town (5) | 17–1 | Corringham Cosmos (7) | |
| 30 | AFC Sudbury (5) | 0–7 | Acle United (5) | |
| 31 | Chesham United (4) | 5–0 | Peterborough United (5) | |
| 32 | Histon (6) | 3–2 | Leigh Ramblers (7) | |
| 33 | Cambridge City (5) | 5–4 | Leyton Orient (4) | |
| 34 | Luton Town (4) | 7–0 | AFC Dunstable (5) | 94 |
| 35 | Enfield Town (4) | 2–1 | Actonians (4) | |
| 36 | Boston United (6) | 3–11 | Norwich City (4) | |
| 37 | New London Lionesses (6) | 2–2 (4–2 p) | Ipswich Town (4) | |
| 38 | Peterborough Northern Star (5) | 1–5 | Stevenage (4) | |
| 39 | Queens Park Rangers Girls (5) | 5–1 | Royston Town (5) | |
| 40 | Cambridge United (4) | 6–0 | Harlow Town (5) | |
| 41 | Worthing (6) | 1–5 | Islington Borough (7) | |
| 42 | Denham United (4) | 1–3 | Crawley Wasps (4) | |
| 43 | AFC Wimbledon (4) | 1–0 (a.e.t.) | AFC Phoenix (5) | |
| 44 | Oxford City (5) | 4–3 | Fulham (5) | |
| 45 | Newhaven (6) | 3–1 | Newbury (5) | |
| 46 | Kent Football United (5) | 9–0 | Burgess Hill Town (7) | |
| 47 | Godalming Town (6) | 4–2 | Abbey Rangers (7) | |
| 48 | Whyteleafe (5) | 2–0 | Maidenhead United (4) | |
| 49 | Ashford Town (Middx) (6) | 11–2 | Ascot United (5) | |
| 50 | Buckland Athletic (4) | 4–0 | Ilminster Town (5) | |
| 51 | Southampton (5) | 5–0 | New Milton Town (5) | |
| 52 | Poole Town (4) | 3–1 | Frampton Rangers (6) | 44 |
| 53 | St Nicholas (4) | A–W | Eastleigh (6) | |
| 54 | Larkhall Athletic (4) | 7–2 | Weston Super Mare (6) | 50 |
| 55 | Swindon Town (4) | 0–8 | Keynsham Town (4) | |
| 56 | Cheltenham Town (4) | 4–1 | Brislington (4) | |
| 57 | Southampton Saints (4) | 3–0 | Warsash Wasps (5) | |
| 58 | AFC Bournemouth (5) | 4–1 | Portishead Town (5) | |
| 59 | Southampton Women (4) | 1–2 | Marine Academy Plymouth (5) | |
| 60 | Exeter City (5) | 8–1 | Keynsham Town Development (5) | |

== Third round qualifying ==
Thirty matches were scheduled for the third qualifying round. All were played on Sunday 7 October.

| Tie | Home team (tier) | Score | Away team (tier) | Att. |
|---|---|---|---|---|
| 1 | West Didsbury & Chorlton (6) | 0–4 | Bolton Wanderers (4) | |
| 2 | Leeds United (4) | 8–0 | Boro Rangers (6) | |
| 3 | Norton & Stockton Ancients (4) | 3–1 | Redcar Town (6) | 80 |
| 4 | FC United of Manchester (5) | 13–0 | Bridlington Rovers (7) | 147 |
| 5 | Chorley (4) | 2–1 | Crewe Alexandra (4) | 88 |
| 6 | Chesterfield (7) | 0–6 | Stockport County (5) | 168 |
| 7 | Brighouse Town (4) | 3–1 | Burnley (4) | |
| 8 | Newcastle United (4) | 0–2 | Chester Le Street Town (4) | |
| 9 | Sporting Khalsa (4) | 1–6 | Long Eaton United (4) | |
| 10 | Kidderminster Harriers (6) | 2–1 | Solihull Moors (4) | |
| 11 | Leicester City Women Development (5) | 2–1 | Oadby & Wigston (6) | |
| 12 | Birmingham & West Midlands (4) | 0–2 | Wolverhampton Wanderers (4) | |
| 13 | Leafield Athletic (5) | 1–2 | West Bromwich Albion (4) | 283 |
| 14 | Nettleham (4) | 9–0 | Histon (6) | |
| 15 | Norwich City (4) | 4–0 | Enfield Town (4) | |
| 16 | Acle United (5) | 0–1 | Cambridge City (5) | 84 |

| Tie | Home team (tier) | Score | Away team (tier) | Att. |
|---|---|---|---|---|
| 17 | Cambridge United (4) | 2–2 (4–2 p) | Stevenage (4) | |
| 18 | Wymondham Town (5) | 3–4 | Billericay Town (4) | |
| 19 | Chesham United (4) | 0–3 | Crawley Wasps (4) | |
| 20 | Islington Borough (7) | 1–2 (a.e.t.) | New London Lionesses (6) | |
| 21 | Ashford Town (Middx) (6) | 3–4 | Kent Football United (5) | 40 |
| 22 | AFC Wimbledon (4) | 4–0 | Godalming Town (6) | 70 |
| 23 | Whyteleafe (5) | 1–2 | Queens Park Rangers Girls (5) | |
| 24 | Luton Town (4) | 5–2 | Oxford City (5) | 44 |
| 25 | Newhaven (6) | 0–8 | AFC Bournemouth (5) | 152 |
| 26 | Buckland Athletic (4) | 2–0 | Marine Academy Plymouth (5) | |
| 27 | Eastleigh (6) | 1–2 | Poole Town (4) | |
| 28 | Keynsham Town (4) | 6–0 | Southampton Saints (4) | |
| 29 | Southampton (5) | 4–1 | Larkhall Athletic (4) | 121 |
| 30 | Cheltenham Town (4) | 1–0 | Exeter City (5) | |

== First round proper ==
Fifteen matches were scheduled for the first round proper. Most matches were played on Sunday 11 November 2018, the only exception being New London Lionesses v AFC Wimbledon which were postponed from the original scheduled date to the following week due to a waterlogged pitch. Cambridge City v Cambridge United was replayed on 25 November 2018 after the initial match took place on a pitch that was too small.

Number of teams per tier still in competition
| Super League | Championship | Premier Division | Division One | Regional & County | Total |
|---|---|---|---|---|---|
| 11 / 11 | 11 / 11 | 25 / 25 | 20 / 20 | 10 / 10 | 77 / 77 |

| 11 November 2018 | Buckland Athletic (4) | 2–0 | Cheltenham Town (4) | Newton Abbot |
| | Stacey; Warman | Report | | Stadium: Homers Heath |

| 11 November 2018 | Chorley (4) | 1–2 | Stockport County (5) | Barnoldswick |
| | Ball 61' | Report | Goal | Stadium: Greenberfield Lane |

| 11 November 2018 | Crawley Wasps (4) | 6–0 | Queens Park Rangers Girls (5) | Crawley |
| | Webber 13'; Plewa 26', 49', 64'; Clapinson 59'; Flieschman 69' | Report | | Stadium: Tinsley Lane |

| 11 November 2018 | FC United of Manchester (5) | 0–5 | Chester Le Street Town (4) | Limeside |
| | Roeves 55'; Havery 58', 83'; Ellison 63'; Jackman 90' | Report | | Stadium: Whitebank Stadium; Attendance: 110 |

| 11 November 2018 | Keynsham Town (4) | 8–1 | AFC Bournemouth (5) | Keynsham |
| | Lorton 5', 14'; Radburn 12', 37'; Hillman 20'; Vega 52'; L. Williams 84'; Bartlett | Report | Hockey 49' | Stadium: Crown Field |

| 11 November 2018 | Kidderminster Harriers (6) | 1–6 | Wolverhampton Wanderers (4) | Kidderminster |
| | Lawrence 86' | Report | Haynes 28'; Barnett 53'; Price 58'; Jennings; Edwards 87' | Stadium: Aggborough Stadium; Attendance: 330 |

| 11 November 2018 | Leeds United (4) | 1–0 | Brighouse Town (4) | Garforth |
| | Freibach 83' | Report | | Stadium: Wheatley Park; Attendance: 150 |

| 11 November 2018 | Luton Town (4) | 1–1 (a.e.t.) (3–1 p) | Kent Football United (5) | Luton |
| | Henman 76' | Report | Waldie 67' | Stadium: Stockwood Park Athletics Stadium |
| | Penalties |
| | Byron (penalty scored); Hassall (penalty scored); Henman (penalty missed); Kosky (penalty scored) | | (penalty scored) Waldie; (penalty missed) Cockerill; (penalty missed) Moloney; (penalty missed) Burnham |

| 11 November 2018 | Nettleham (4) | 2–3 | Long Eaton United (4) | Nettleham |
| | Murrell 32', 48' | Report | Arber | Stadium: Mulsanne Park |

| 11 November 2018 | Norton & Stockton Ancients (4) | 0–1 | Bolton Wanderers (4) | Norton |
| | | Report | Newhouse 30' | Stadium: Norton Sports Complex; Attendance: 100 |

| 11 November 2018 | Norwich City (4) | 2–3 (a.e.t.) | Billericay Town (4) | Blofield |
| | Goal | Report | Goal | Stadium: Plantation Park |

| 11 November 2018 | Poole Town (4) | 0–3 | Southampton (5) | Milborne St Andrew |
| | | Report | Freeland 45'; Sievwright 67'; Pusey 75' | Stadium: Milborne St Andrew Sports Ground; Attendance: 66 |

| 11 November 2018 | West Bromwich Albion (4) | 2–1 | Leicester City Women Development (5) | Boldmere |
| | Harper; Reid | Report | Goal | Stadium: Boldmere Community Stadium |

| 18 November 2018 | New London Lionesses (6) | 3–3 (a.e.t.) (3–4 p) | AFC Wimbledon (4) |
| | Goal | Report | Bisson 34', 40', 55' |
| | Penalties |
| | Penalty missed Penalty scored | | Penalty missed Penalty scored |

| 25 November 2018 | Cambridge City (5) | 0–2 | Cambridge United (4) | Mildenhall |
| | | Report | Coupar; Howlett | Stadium: Recreation Way |
Note: Original void match due to small pitch size

== Second round proper ==
Twenty matches were scheduled for the second round proper. The 40 teams taking part consisted of 25 FA Women's National League Northern and Southern Division teams exempted to this stage, plus the 15 match winners from the previous round. Matches were played on Sunday 2 December, except three which were postponed to the following week.

Number of teams per tier still in competition
| Super League | Championship | Premier Division | Division One | Regional & County | Total |
|---|---|---|---|---|---|
| 11 / 11 | 11 / 11 | 25 / 25 | 13 / 20 | 2 / 10 | 62 / 77 |

| 2 December 2018 | AFC Wimbledon (4) | 2–0 | Portsmouth (3) | Carshalton |
| | Bisson 28'; Heasman 57' | Report | | Stadium: War Memorial Sports Ground; Attendance: 95 |

| 2 December 2018 | Billericay Town (4) | 3–1 (a.e.t.) | Luton Town (4) | Billericay |
| | Stephanou 64'; Kelly 100'; Blackie 116' | Report | Ryan 57' | Stadium: New Lodge |

| 2 December 2018 | Cardiff City (3) | 4–0 | Queens Park Rangers (3) | Ystrad Mynach |
| | G. Davies; Rees; C. Williams; Horrell | Report | | Stadium: CCB Centre for Sporting Excellence; Attendance: 125 |

| 2 December 2018 | Chester Le Street Town (4) | 0–2 | Stoke City (3) | Chester-le-Street |
| | | Report | Tezgel 73'; McCoy 82' | Stadium: Moor Park |

| 2 December 2018 | Coventry United (3) | 2–1 | Plymouth Argyle (3) | Daventry |
| | Austin 15'; Wathan 63' | Report | Bleazard 17' | Stadium: Browns Road |

| 2 December 2018 | Derby County (3) | 2–0 | Guiseley Vixens (3) | Mickleover |
| | Ledgister 19'; Smith 77' | Report | | Stadium: Station Road |

| 2 December 2018 | Huddersfield Town (3) | 7–1 | Bradford City (3) | Shelley |
| | Mallin 2', 17', 38'; Dobby 11'; Elford 18'; Sowerby 34'; Parnham 80' | Report | Roberts 88' | Stadium: The Stafflex Arena; Attendance: 105 |

| 2 December 2018 | Keynsham Town (4) | 8–3 | C&K Basildon (3) | Keynsham |
| | L. Williams 16'; Bartlett 21', 33', 45+1', 60'; Lorton 53'; Vega 76'; Hillman 78' | Report | Goal | Stadium: Crown Field |

| 2 December 2018 | Leeds United (4) | 4–3 (a.e.t.) | Doncaster Rovers Belles (3) | Thorp Arch |
| | Hunt 26', 30'; Freibach 36'; Thompson 102' | Report | Belding; Whittle; Burgin | Stadium: Thorp Arch; Attendance: 200 |

| 2 December 2018 | Long Eaton United (4) | 0–5 | Hull City (3) | Long Eaton |
| | | Report | Ackroyd; H. Knight; Russell | Stadium: Grange Park; Attendance: 60 |

| 2 December 2018 | Loughborough Foxes (3) | 3–1 (a.e.t.) | Gillingham (3) | Loughborough |
| | Broad 19'; R. Knight 4', 8' | Report | Bussey | Stadium: Loughborough University Stadium; Attendance: 48 |

| 2 December 2018 | Middlesbrough (3) | 1–0 | Stockport County (5) | Billingham |
| | Goal | Report | | Stadium: Bedford Terrace; Referee: a |

| 2 December 2018 | Milton Keynes Dons (3) | 4–0 | Southampton (5) | Milton Keynes |
| | Cudone; Littlechild | Report | | Stadium: Stadium MK |

| 2 December 2018 | Oxford United (3) | 4–0 | Cambridge United (4) | Marston |
| | Noble 30'; Haynes 34'; Fyfe 46'; Gane 65' | Report | | Stadium: Marsh Lane; Attendance: 85 |

| 2 December 2018 | Sheffield (3) | 2–3 | Nottingham Forest (3) | Dronfield |
| | Hawcroft; White | Report | Edwards 25', 74', 81' | Stadium: Home of Football |

| 2 December 2018 | Sunderland (3) | 1–3 | Fylde (3) | Hetton-le-Hole |
| | Barker 78' | Report | Young 15'; Charlton 45'; Hollinshead 88' | Stadium: Eppleton Colliery Welfare Ground; Attendance: 85; Referee: Givi Todua |

| 2 December 2018 | Wolverhampton Wanderers (4) | 0–4 | Blackburn Rovers (3) | Wolverhampton |
| | | Report | Donaghue 35'; Taylor 41'; Widdal 44' (o.g.); Holbrook 71' | Stadium: Castlecroft Stadium; Attendance: 60 |

| 9 December 2018 | Bolton Wanderers (4) | 2–2 (a.e.t.) (5–4 p) | West Bromwich Albion (4) | Little Lever |
| | Goal | Report | Davies; H. James | Stadium: Little Lever School |
| | Penalties |
| | Penalty scored | | Penalty scored Penalty missed |

| 9 December 2018 | Crawley Wasps (4) | 2–0 | Chichester City (3) | Worthing |
| | Webber 38'; D. James 43' | Report | | Stadium: Woodside Road |

| 9 December 2018 | Watford (3) | 1–0 | Buckland Athletic (4) | Kings Langley |
| | O'Leary 70' | Report | | Stadium: Gaywood Park |

== Third round proper ==
Ten matches were scheduled for the third round proper. All were played on Sunday 6 January.

Number of teams per tier still in competition
| Super League | Championship | Premier Division | Division One | Regional & County | Total |
|---|---|---|---|---|---|
| 11 / 11 | 11 / 11 | 14 / 25 | 6 / 20 | 0 / 10 | 42 / 77 |

| 6 January 2019 | Billericay Town (4) | 3–4 | Loughborough Foxes (3) | Billericay |
| | Pittuck; Rushen | Report | Knight 9'; Hogg 12', 33'; Rogers 68' | Stadium: New Lodge |

| 6 January 2019 | Cardiff City (3) | 2–0 | Bolton Wanderers (4) | Ystrad Mynach |
| | C. Williams 3' | Report | | Stadium: CCB Centre for Sporting Excellence |

| 6 January 2019 | Coventry United (3) | 1–2 | Crawley Wasps (4) | Daventry |
| | Hughes 26' | Report | Flieschman 27'; D. James 90+1' | Stadium: Master Abrasives Stadium |

| 6 January 2019 | Derby County (3) | 1–2 | Stoke City (3) | Mickleover |
| | Goal | Report | Tezgel; Keryakoplis | Stadium: Station Road; Attendance: 244 |

| 6 January 2019 | Huddersfield Town (3) | 4–1 | Leeds United (4) | Shelley |
| | Sanderson 1', 17'; Danby 55'; Elford 57' | Report | Thompson 30' | Stadium: Graham Leslie Arena; Attendance: 156; Referee: 156 |

| 6 January 2019 | Hull City (3) | 0–3 | AFC Wimbledon (4) | Kingston upon Hull |
| | | Report | Stanley 62'; Hoesli-Atkins 69'; Heasman 90+2' | Stadium: Hull University |

| 6 January 2019 | Keynsham Town (4) | 2–1 | Fylde (3) | Keynsham |
| | Bartlett 34'; Vega 80' | Report | Charlton 43' | Stadium: Crown Field |

| 6 January 2019 | Middlesbrough (3) | 2–7 | Watford (3) | Billingham |
| | Scarr 18'; Dale 28' | Report | Scanlon {{goal}7}}; Ward 10', 20', 81', 84'; O'Leary 39'; Scrivens 61' | Stadium: Bedford Terrace |

| 6 January 2019 | Nottingham Forest (3) | 0–1 | Milton Keynes Dons (3) | Gedling |
| | | Report | Farrow | Stadium: Bill Stokeld Stadium |

| 6 January 2019 | Oxford United (3) | 1–2 | Blackburn Rovers (3) | Marston |
| | Gane 45' | Report | Flint 66', 90' | Stadium: Marsh Lane; Attendance: 203 |

== Fourth round proper ==
Sixteen matches were scheduled for the fourth round proper. The 32 teams taking part consists of 11 FA Women's Super League and 11 FA Women's Championship teams exempted to this stage, plus the ten match winners from the previous round. Half of the matches were played on the weekend of Saturday 2 and Sunday 3 February, with the other half postponed to the following week as a result of bad weather.

Number of teams per tier still in competition
| Super League | Championship | Premier Division | Division One | Regional & County | Total |
|---|---|---|---|---|---|
| 11 / 11 | 11 / 11 | 7 / 25 | 3 / 20 | 0 / 10 | 32 / 77 |

| 2 February 2019 | Manchester City (1) | 3–0 | Watford (3) | Manchester |
| | Parris 62', 69'; Bremer 86' | Report | | Stadium: Academy Stadium; Attendance: 883; Referee: Ben Atkinson |

| 3 February 2019 | AFC Wimbledon (4) | 0–3 | Bristol City (1) | Carshalton |
| | | Report | Harrison 1'; Robinson 24'; Wilson 36' | Stadium: War Memorial Sports Ground; Attendance: 520 |

| 3 February 2019 | Brighton & Hove Albion (1) | 0–2 | Manchester United (2) | Crawley |
| | | Report | L. James 51', 90+2' | Stadium: Broadfield Stadium |

| 3 February 2019 | Crawley Wasps (4) | 0–4 | Arsenal (1) | Crawley |
| | | Report | K. Little 17'; Grant 43', 75', 86' | Stadium: Tinsley Lane; Attendance: 1,550 |

| 3 February 2019 | Crystal Palace (2) | 0–3 | Tottenham Hotspur (2) | Bromley |
| | | Report | Naz 40'; A. Neville 45'; Haines 55' | Stadium: Hayes Lane; Referee: Matthew Pollington |

| 3 February 2019 | Everton (1) | 0–2 | Chelsea (1) | Blowick |
| | | Report | Spence 66'; Blundell 90' | Stadium: Haig Avenue; Attendance: 560; Referee: Dean Watson |

| 3 February 2019 | Leicester City (2) | 0–2 | London Bees (2) | Quorn |
| | | Report | Wilkinson 8'; Littlejohn 58' | Stadium: Farley Way Stadium |

| 3 February 2019 | West Ham United (1) | 3–1 | Blackburn Rovers (3) | Romford |
| | Leon 45', 79'; Visalli 72' | Report | Flint 14' | Stadium: Rush Green Stadium |

| 10 February 2019 | Charlton Athletic (2) | 3–3 (a.e.t.) (4–5 p) | Huddersfield Town (3) | Crayford |
| | Graham 6', 67'; Gurr 34' | Report | Sanderson 75'; Elford 77'; Mallin 85' | Stadium: The Oakwood; Attendance: 184 |
| | Penalties |
| | Agg (penalty scored); Gurr (penalty scored); Ejupi (penalty missed); Eggesvik (penalty scored); Clifford (penalty scored) | | (penalty scored) Sanderson; (penalty scored) Mallin; (penalty scored) Elford; (penalty scored) Danby; (penalty scored) Nutter |

| 10 February 2019 | Durham (2) | 5–1 | Cardiff City (3) | Belmont |
| | Holmes 9'; Hepple 43'; Robson 54'; Ness 81', 89' | Report | Nolan 25' | Stadium: New Ferens Park; Attendance: 283; Referee: Matthew Sowerby |

| 10 February 2019 | Liverpool (1) | 6–0 | Milton Keynes Dons (3) | Prenton |
| | Coombs 31'; Sweetman-Kirk 32'; L. Little 60'; Purfield 61', 86'; Hodson 79' | Report | | Stadium: Prenton Park; Attendance: 394 |

| 10 February 2019 | Loughborough Foxes (3) | 0–2 | Sheffield United (2) | Loughborough |
| | | Report | Paul 14'; Sarri 54' | Stadium: Loughborough University Stadium |

| 10 February 2019 | Millwall Lionesses (2) | 1–0 | Lewes (2) | Dartford |
| | G. Neville 90' | Report | | Stadium: Princes Park |

| 10 February 2019 | Reading (1) | 13–0 | Keynsham Town (4) | Woking |
| | Bruton 37', 53'; Chaplen 48', 49'; F. Williams 21', 24', 28', 55', 59'; Estcourt 68'; Honnudottir 78', 80'; Davison 84' | Report | | Stadium: Woking |

| 10 February 2019 | Stoke City (3) | 1–2 | Aston Villa (2) | Smallthorne |
| | Keryakoplis 6' | Report | Welsh 58'; Haywood 66' | Stadium: Norton Cricket Club & Miners Welfare Institute; Attendance: 252 |

| 10 February 2019 | Yeovil Town (1) | 1–3 | Birmingham City (1) | Dorchester |
| | Bloomfield 77' | Report | Mannion 37'; Follis 46'; Wellings 59' | Stadium: The Avenue Stadium; Attendance: 523 |

== Fifth round proper ==
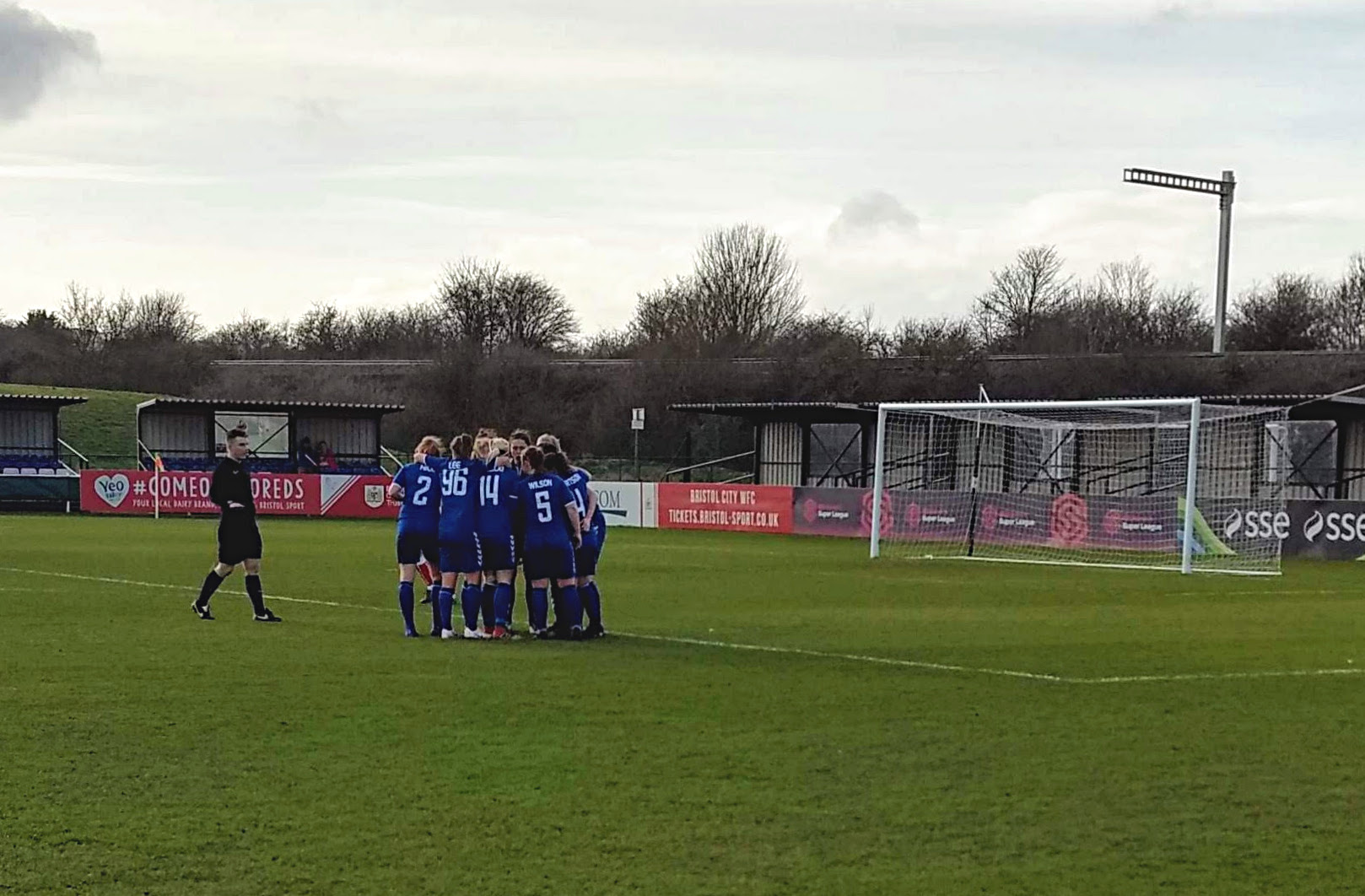
Durham players celebrate the first of their two goals against Bristol City

Eight matches were scheduled for the fifth round proper. All were played on Sunday 17 February 2019.

Number of teams per tier still in competition
| Super League | Championship | Premier Division | Division One | Regional & County | Total |
|---|---|---|---|---|---|
| 8 / 11 | 7 / 11 | 1 / 25 | 0 / 20 | 0 / 10 | 16 / 77 |

| 17 February 2019 | Aston Villa (2) | 3–3 (a.e.t.) (5–3 p) | Sheffield United (2) | Boldmere |
| | Hutton 73', 87', 90' | Report | Cusack 27'; Salmon 59'; Rayner 84' | Stadium: Boldmere Community Stadium; Attendance: 252; Referee: Andy Genders |
| | Penalties |
| | Hassall (penalty scored); West (penalty scored); Gibson (penalty scored); Haywood (penalty scored); Hutton (penalty scored) | | (penalty missed) Paul; (penalty scored) Gilliatt; (penalty scored) Pennock; (penalty scored) Marsden |

| 17 February 2019 | Bristol City (1) | 0–2 | Durham (2) | Filton |
| | | Report | Robertson 65', 90' | Stadium: Stoke Gifford Stadium |

| 17 February 2019 | Chelsea (1) | 3–0 | Arsenal (1) | Kingston upon Thames |
| | England 4', 58'; Andersson 39' | Report | | Stadium: Kingsmeadow; Attendance: 2,232; Referee: Paul Howard |

| 17 February 2019 | Liverpool (1) | 2–0 | Millwall Lionesses (2) | Prenton |
| | Linnett 57'; Babajide 67' | Report | | Stadium: Prenton Park |

| 17 February 2019 | Manchester United (2) | 3–0 | London Bees (2) | Hyde |
| | Toone 27'; Green 33'; Devlin 87' | Report | | Stadium: Ewen Fields; Attendance: 838; Referee: Adam Williamson |

| 17 February 2019 | Reading (1) | 2–1 | Birmingham City (1) | High Wycombe |
| | Pearce 69'; Hönnudóttir 84' | Report | Mannion 77' | Stadium: Adams Park |

| 17 February 2019 | Tottenham Hotspur (2) | 0–3 | Manchester City (1) | Cheshunt |
| | | Report | Houghton 37'; Hemp 39'; Bonner 50' | Stadium: Theobalds Lane; Attendance: 1,158 |

| 17 February 2019 | West Ham United (1) | 8–1 | Huddersfield Town (3) | Romford |
| | Longhurst 22'; Kiernan 27', 81', 84'; Lehmann 37'; Ross 38'; Kmita 65'; Visalli 71' | Report | Mallin 14' | Stadium: Rush Green Stadium; Attendance: 865 |

== Quarter-finals ==
The four matches of the quarter-finals were played on Sunday 17 March 2019.

Number of teams per tier still in competition
| Super League | Championship | Premier Division | Division One | Regional & County | Total |
|---|---|---|---|---|---|
| 5 / 11 | 3 / 11 | 0 / 25 | 0 / 20 | 0 / 10 | 8 / 77 |

| 17 March 2019 | Aston Villa (2) | 0–1 | West Ham United (1) | Boldmere |
| | | Report | Ross 26' | Stadium: Boldmere Community Stadium; Attendance: 609; Referee: Helen Conley |

| 17 March 2019 | Durham (2) | 0–1 | Chelsea (1) | Durham |
| | | Report | Ji 28' | Stadium: New Ferens Park; Attendance: 1,629; Referee: David Richardson |

| 17 March 2019 | Manchester City (1) | 3–0 | Liverpool (1) | Manchester |
| | Beckie 25'; Stanway 69', 88' | Report | | Stadium: Academy Stadium; Attendance: 1,366; Referee: Peter Gibbons |

| 17 March 2019 | Reading (1) | 3–2 (a.e.t.) | Manchester United (2) | High Wycombe |
| | Allen 100'; Furness 108'; Hönnudóttir 120' | Report | Greenwood 98'; Harding 107' (o.g.) | Stadium: Adams Park; Attendance: 951 |

== Semi-finals ==
Number of teams per tier still in competition
| Super League | Championship | Premier Division | Division One | Regional & County | Total |
|---|---|---|---|---|---|
| 4 / 11 | 0 / 11 | 0 / 25 | 0 / 20 | 0 / 10 | 4 / 77 |

| 14 April 2019 | Reading (1) | 1–1 (a.e.t.) (3–4 p) | West Ham United (1) | Adams Park, High Wycombe |
| 12:30 BST | Furness 49' | Report | Lehmann 57' |
| | Penalties |
| | Davison (penalty scored); Hönnudóttir (penalty missed); Bruton (penalty missed); Furness (penalty scored); Allen (penalty scored); Moore (penalty missed) | | (penalty scored) Ross; (penalty missed) Visalli; (penalty scored) Leon; (penalty missed) Longhurst; (penalty scored) Flaherty; (penalty scored) Cho |

| 14 April 2019 | Manchester City (1) | 1–0 | Chelsea (1) | Academy Stadium, Manchester |
| 15:30 BST | Eriksson 90+2' (o.g.) | Report |

== Final ==
4 May 2019
17:30 BST

| Manchester City | 3–0 | West Ham United |
|---|---|---|
| Walsh 52'; Stanway 81'; Hemp 88' | Report |

Wembley Stadium, London
Attendance: 43,264
Referee: Abigail Byrne (Suffolk)

== Television rights ==
| Round | BBC | Ref. |
|---|---|---|
| Semi-finals | Reading v West Ham United (BBC Red Button); Manchester City vs Chelsea (BBC Two) | |
| Final | West Ham United v Manchester City (BBC One) | |
