= 2026–27 Charlton Athletic W.F.C. season =

Charlton Athletic
2026–27 season
- Head Coach: Karen Hills
- Stadium: The Valley
- Highest home attendance: 3,027 (vs. Chelsea, 1 November 2026)
- Lowest home attendance: 1,362 (vs. Aston Villa, 22 November 2026)
- Average home league attendance: 2,310

The 2026–27 Charlton Athletic W.F.C. season is the club's 1st season in the Women's Super League, the highest level of the football pyramid. Along with competing in the WSL, the club will also contest in two domestic cup competitions: the FA Cup and the League Cup. It is the first time Charlton has competed in the top flight since 2008.

== Squad ==
As of 11 September 2026

No.	Player	Nationality	Date of birth (age)	Signed from	Since
Goalkeepers
1	Sophie Whitehouse	(Republic of Ireland)	10 October 1996 (age 30)	(England) Lewes	2024
21	Anna Pederson	(England)	19 March 2002 (age 24)	(England) Rugby Borough	2025
35	Anna Koivunen	(Finland)	6 November 2001 (age 25)	(Sweden) Djurgårdens IF	2026
Defenders
2	Ellie Mason	(Northern Ireland)	16 February 1996 (age 30)	(England) Birmingham City	2025
3	Charlotte Newsham	(Scotland)	14 May 2000 (age 26)	(England) Sheffield United	2024
4	Grace Johnston	(Australia)	7 April 2005 (age 21)	(Australia) Perth Glory	2026
5	Elisha N'Dow	(England)	13 October 1996 (age 30)	(England) Aston Villa	2023
17	Kiera Skeels (captain)	(England)	20 November 2001 (age 25)	(England) Reading	2021
19	Hawa Cissoko	(France)	April 10, 1997 (age 29)	(Italy) Parma	2026
23	Lucia Lobato	(Republic of Ireland)	23 January 2001 (age 25)	(France) Olympique de Marseille	2025
25	Lizzie Waldie	(England)	9 June 2000 (age 26)	(Scotland) Heart of Midlothian	2026
29	Ashleigh Neville	(England)	29 April 1993 (age 33)	(England) Leicester City	2026
30	Leighanne Robe	(England)	December 26, 1993 (age 32)	(Mexico) UNAM	2026
Midfielders
6	Leah Davidson	(Australia)	28 March 2001 (age 25)	(Australia) Melbourne City	2026
8	Carla Humphrey	(England)	15 December 1996 (age 29)	(England) Liverpool	2023
10	Gillian Kenney	(United States)	19 September 2002 (age 24)	(United States) Providence College	2025
11	Lucy Fitzgerald	(England)	29 November 2000 (age 25)	(England) London City Lionesses	2025
12	Jodie Hutton	(England)	11 February 2001 (age 25)	(England) Sheffield United	2024
14	Keira Flannery	(England)	24 September 2005 (age 21)	(England) West Ham United	2026
22	Emily van Egmond	(Australia)	12 July 1993 (age 33)	(England) Leicester City	2026
Forwards
7	Paula Partido	(Spain)	2 March 2005 (age 21)	(England) London City Lionesses (loan)	2026
9	Lorena Azzaro	(France)	22 October 2000 (age 26)	(France) Paris FC (loan)	2026
13	Linda Líf Boama	(Iceland)	15 August 2001 (age 25)	(Sweden) Kristianstads DFF	2026
15	Katie Lockwood	(England)	1 April 1998 (age 28)	(Scotland) Glasgow City FC	2026
16	Cassandra Korhonen	(Sweden)	January 1, 1998 (age 28)	(Denmark) HB Køge	2026
18	Gloria Siber	(Hungary)	7 March 2004 (age 22)	(England) AFC Wimbledon	2024
Out on loan
20	Mary McAteer	(Wales)	2 January 2004 (age 22)	(England) Sunderland	2025

== Pre-season ==
19 July 2026 Friendly	Chatham Town	0–3	Charlton Athletic
		Report	Mason 32'; Skeels 52'; Kenney 57'	Attendance: N/A

7 August 2026 Friendly	Charlton Athletic	0–1	Atlético Madrid	Málaga
		Report	Jensen 45'	Stadium: PFC Costa del Sol

26 August 2026 Friendly	Arsenal	5–1	Charlton Athletic	Borehamwood
	Stanway 35'; Caldentey 44' (pen.); Cooney-Cross 56'; Smith 89'; Maanum 90+2'	Report	Fitzgerald 24'	Stadium: Meadow Park; Attendance: 2,283; Referee: Sophie Dennington

30 August 2026 Friendly	Charlton Athletic	3–1	Wolverhampton Wanderers	Charlton
	Neville 17', 39'; Humphrey 48'	Report	Daniëls 85'	Stadium: The Valley

== Women's Super League ==
=== League table ===
Pos	Team	Pld	W	D	L	GF	GA	GD	Pts	Qualification or relegation
10	Liverpool	11	3	3	5	17	16	+1	12	
11	Everton	11	3	3	5	8	11	−3	12	
12	Crystal Palace	11	2	3	6	12	27	−15	9	
13	Birmingham City	11	1	3	7	12	24	−12	6	Qualification for WSL2 promotion/relegation play-off
14	Charlton Athletic	11	0	1	10	6	31	−25	1	Relegation to the WSL2

Updated to match(es) played on 22 November 2026. Source: Women's Super League Table
Rules for classification: 1) Points; 2) Goal difference; 3) Number of goals scored.

=== Matches ===
The league schedule was released on 30 July 2026.

6 September 2026 1	Charlton Athletic	0–4	Liverpool	Charlton
14:00 BST	N'Dow (yellow card) 50'; Fitzgerlad (yellow card) 51'; Whitehouse (yellow card) 90+5'	Report	Fisk 8', 52'; Holland (yellow card) 15'; Nagano (yellow card) 27'; Endemann 63'; Kapocs 90+5' (pen.)	Stadium: The Valley; Attendance: 2,151; Referee: Sophie Dennington

13 September 2026 2	Everton	1–0	Charlton Athletic	Liverpool
14:00 BST	Robe 77' (o.g.)	Report	Neville (red card) 58'; Cissoko (yellow card) 90+1' (red card) 90+3'	Stadium: Goodison Park; Attendance: 1,633; Referee: Alice Parker

19 September 2026 3	Charlton Athletic	1–4	London City Lionesses	Charlton
12:30 BST	Hutton 39'; Robe (yellow card) 40'; Mason (yellow card) 54'; Davidson (yellow card) 70'	Report	Goodwin 13', 15'; Fernández 44'; Anyomi 76'	Stadium: The Valley; Attendance: 1,886; Referee: Kirsty Dowle

26 September 2026 4	Charlton Athletic	0–1	Manchester City	Charlton
13:30 BST		Report	Greenwood 36'; Coffey (yellow card) 45+2'	Stadium: The Valley; Attendance: 2,147; Referee: Megan Wilson

4 October 2026 5	Brighton & Hove Albion	5–1	Charlton Athletic	Falmer
14:00 BST	Seike 25', 54'; Kirby 45+2'; Tvedten (yellow card) 73'; Symonds 90+3'; George 90+9'		Korhonen 3'; Neville (yellow card) 46'; Siber (yellow card) 62'; N'Dow (yellow card) 80'	Stadium: Falmer Stadium; Attendance: 2,465; Referee: Adewunmi Soneye

18 October 2026 6	Charlton Athletic	1–3	Manchester United	Charlton
14:00 BST	Davidson 13'	Report	Toone 6'; Medina 10'; Zigiotti 31', (yellow card) 66'	Stadium: The Valley; Attendance: 2,340; Referee: Amy Fearn

25 October 2026 7	Birmingham City	1–0	Charlton Athletic	Bordesley
14:00 GMT	Miyagawa (yellow card) 47'; Leidhammar 68'	Report		Stadium: St Andrew's; Attendance: 1,410; Referee: Megan Wilson

1 November 2026 8	Charlton Athletic	0–6	Chelsea	Charlton
14:30 GMT	Hutton (yellow card) 50'	Report	Björn 3'; Malard 10', 19'; Carpenter 13'; Beever-Jones 57'; Dragoni 66'	Stadium: The Valley; Attendance: 3,027; Referee: Melissa Burgin

8 November 2026 9	Crystal Palace	3–2	Charlton Athletic	Sutton
14:00 GMT	Lloyd-Smith 57'; Larkin (yellow card) 60'; Everett 81'; England 90'	Report	Flannery (yellow card) 59'; N'Dow 73'; Davidson 74'	Stadium: Gander Green Lane; Referee: Amy Fearn

15 November 2026 10	West Ham United	2–0	Charlton Athletic	Dagenham
14:00 GMT	Asseyi 43', 53'; Riesen (yellow card) 45+1'	Report	Johnston (yellow card) 45+1'; Flannery (yellow card) 56'; Korhonen (yellow card) 70'	Stadium: Victoria Road; Referee: Abigail Byrne

22 November 2026 11	Charlton Athletic	1–1	Aston Villa	Charlton
	Flannery 17' (pen.) (yellow card) 56'	Report	Parker 71'; Jean-François (yellow card) 90+1'	Stadium: The Valley; Attendance: 1,362; Referee: Megan Wilson

13 December 2026 12	Tottenham Hotspur	v	Charlton Athletic	Leyton
				Stadium: Brisbane Road

20 December 2026 13	Charlton Athletic	v	Arsenal	Charlton
				Stadium: The Valley

10 January 2027 14	Charlton Athletic	v	Birmingham City	Charlton
				Stadium: The Valley

20 January 2027 15	Chelsea	v	Charlton Athletic	Fulham
				Stadium: Stamford Bridge

24 January 2027 16	Manchester City	v	Charlton Athletic	Sportcity
				Stadium: Academy Stadium

31 January 2027 17	Charlton Athletic	v	Crystal Palace	Charlton
				Stadium: The Valley

7 February 2027 18	Aston Villa	v	Charlton Athletic	Birmingham
				Stadium: Villa Park

14 February 2027 19	Charlton Athletic	v	West Ham United	Charlton
				Stadium: The Valley

14 March 2027 20	Manchester United	v	Charlton Athletic	Leigh
				Stadium: Leigh Sports Village

17 March 2027 21	Charlton Athletic	v	Everton	Charlton
				Stadium: The Valley

28 March 2027 22	Charlton Athletic	v	Brighton & Hove Albion	Charlton
				Stadium: The Valley

4 April 2027 23	London City Lionesses	v	Charlton Athletic	Bromley
				Stadium: Hayes Lane

2 May 2027 24	Liverpool	v	Charlton Athletic	St Helens
14:00 UTC				Stadium: St Helens Stadium

9 May 2027 25	Charlton Athletic	v	Tottenham Hotspur	Charlton
				Stadium: The Valley

22 May 2027 26	Arsenal	v	Charlton Athletic	Holloway
				Stadium: Emirates Stadium

== Women's FA Cup ==
As a member of the first tier, Charlton Athletic will enter the FA Cup in the fourth round proper.

== WSL Players Cup ==
Pos	Grp	Team	Pld	W	PW	PL	L	GF	GA	GD	Pts
13	SR	Ipswich Town	5	2	0	1	2	7	5	+2	7
14	NR	Nottingham Forest	5	2	0	1	2	7	6	+1	7
15	SR	Charlton Athletic	5	2	0	0	3	4	9	−5	6
16	SR	Southampton	5	1	0	2	2	6	8	−2	5
17	NR	Sheffield United	5	1	1	0	3	7	14	−7	5

Updated to match(es) played on 22 November 2026. Source: WSL Football
Rules for classification: 1) Points; 2) Goal difference; 3) Number of goals scored; 4) Number of wins; 5) Head-to-head record

=== League Phase ===
Following the competition's restructuring, Leicester City were drawn in the Southern Region for the league stage of the competition.

Win Draw Loss Fixtures

23 September 2026 1	Brighton & Hove Albion	4–0	Charlton Athletic	Crawley
19:45 BST	Tvedten 14', 55'; Hayes 65'; Peskett 82'	Report		Stadium: Broadfield Stadium; Attendance: 505; Referee: Oliver Mackey

30 September 2026 2	Crystal Palace	3–0	Charlton Athletic	Sutton
19:00 BST	Hopcroft 22'; Howat 62'; Bartrip (yellow card) 65'; Lloyd-Smith 90+3'	Report		Stadium: VBS Community Stadium; Attendance: 264; Referee: Lisa Benn

21 October 2026 3	Charlton Athletic	2–0	Bristol City	Charlton
19:30 BST	van Egmond 75'; Waldie 80'	Report	Woś (yellow card) 37'; McDonald (red card) 56'	Stadium: The Valley; Attendance: 306; Referee: Lisa Benn

28 October 2026 4	Charlton Athletic	1–2	West Ham United	Charlton
19:30 GMT	Johnston 68'; Waldie (yellow card) 89'	Report	Morgan 39', 42'; Asseyi (yellow card) 90'	Stadium: The Valley; Attendance: 420; Referee: Amy Fearn

11 November 2026 5	Charlton Athletic	1–0	Ipswich Town	Charlton
19:30 GMT	Azzaro 79'	Report		Stadium: The Valley; Attendance: 392; Referee: Ella Broad

16 December 2026 6	Leicester City	v	Charlton Athletic	Nottingham
19:00 GMT		Report		Stadium: Meadow Lane

== Transfers and contracts ==
=== In ===
Date	Position	Nationality	Name	From	Ref.
18 July 2026	DF	(Australia)	Grace Johnston	(Australia) Perth Glory	
22 July 2026	GK	(Finland)	Anna Koivunen	(Sweden) Djurgårdens IF	
24 July 2026	MF	(Australia)	Leah Davidson	(Australia) Melbourne City	
29 July 2026	DF	(England)	Ashleigh Neville	(England) Leicester City	
5 August 2026	MF	(Australia)	Emily van Egmond	(England) Leicester City	
24 August 2026	MF	(England)	Keira Flannery	(England) West Ham United	
29 August 2026	FW	(Iceland)	Linda Líf Boama	(Sweden) Kristianstads	
5 September 2026	DF	(France)	Hawa Cissoko	(Italy) Parma	
5 September 2026	DF	(England)	Leighanne Robe	(Mexico) Pumas	
10 September 2026	FW	(Sweden)	Cassandra Korhonen	(Denmark) HB Køge	

=== Out ===
Date	Position	Nationality	Name	To	Ref.
12 June 2026	FW	(England)	Emma Bissell	(England) Bristol City	
12 June 2026	MF	(Canada)	Frankie Finlayson		
12 June 2026	FW	(England)	Karin Muya	(England) Watford	
12 June 2026	DF	(England)	Gracie Pearse	(England) Sheffield United	
12 June 2026	FW	(Denmark)	Amalie Thestrup	(Denmark) Brøndby IF	
9 July 2026	FW	(England)	Katie Bradley	(England) Newcastle United	
2 September 2026	DF	(England)	Mia Ross		

=== Loans in ===
Date	Position	Nationality	Name	From	Until	Ref.
18 July 2026	MF	(Spain)	Paula Partido	(England) London City Lionesses	End of season	
27 July 2026	FW	(France)	Lorena Azzaro	(France) Paris FC	End of season	

=== Loans out ===
Date	Position	Nationality	Name	To	Until	Ref.
3 September 2026	FW	(Wales)	Mary McAteer	(England) Ipswich Town	End of season	

=== New contracts ===
Date	No.	Pos.	Nat.	Name	Until	Ref.
15 July 2026	8	MF	(England)	Carla Humphrey	30 June 2027	
15 July 2026	2	DF	(Northern Ireland)	Ellie Mason	30 June 2027	
15 July 2026	21	GK	(England)	Anna Pedersen	30 June 2027	
16 July 2026	18	FW	(Hungary)	Gloria Siber	30 June 2027	
16 July 2026	10	MF	(United States)	Gillian Kenney	30 June 2027	
17 July 2026	11	MF	(England)	Lucy Fitzgerald	30 June 2027	
17 July 2026	23	DF	(Republic of Ireland)	Lucia Lobato	30 June 2027	
19 July 2026	5	DF	(England)	Elisha N'Dow	30 June 2027	
29 July 2026	3	DF	(Scotland)	Charlotte Newsham	2027	

== Squad statistics ==
As of match played 26 September 2026

=== Appearances ===
No.	Pos	Nat	Player	Total		Women's Super League		FA Cup		WSL Players Cup	
No.	Pos	Nat	Player	Apps	Goals	Apps	Goals	Apps	Goals	Apps	Goals
1	GK	(Republic of Ireland) IRL	Sophie Whitehouse	4	0	4+0	0	0+0	0	0+0	0
2	DF	(Northern Ireland) NIR	Ellie Mason	5	0	2+2	0	0+0	0	1+0	0
3	DF	(Scotland) SCO	Charlotte Newsham	0	0	0+0	0	0+0	0	0+0	0
4	DF	(Australia) AUS	Grace Johnston	5	0	1+3	0	0+0	0	1+0	0
5	DF	(England) ENG	Elisha N'Dow	4	0	4+0	0	0+0	0	0+0	0
6	MF	(Australia) AUS	Leah Davidson	4	0	4+0	0	0+0	0	0+0	0
7	FW	(Spain) ESP	Paula Partido	1	0	1+0	0	0+0	0	0+0	0
8	MF	(England) ENG	Carla Humphrey	1	0	0+0	0	0+0	0	1+0	0
9	FW	(France) FRA	Lorena Azzaro	4	0	1+2	0	0+0	0	1+0	0
10	MF	(United States) USA	Gillian Kenney	4	0	1+2	0	0+0	0	1+0	0
11	MF	(England) ENG	Lucy Fitzgerald	5	0	2+2	0	0+0	0	0+1	0
12	MF	(England) ENG	Jodie Hutton	5	1	4+0	1	0+0	0	0+1	0
13	FW	(Iceland) ISL	Linda Líf Boama	0	0	0+0	0	0+0	0	0+0	0
14	MF	(England) ENG	Keira Flannery	4	0	2+1	0	0+0	0	1+0	0
15	FW	(England) ENG	Katie Lockwood	2	0	0+1	0	0+0	0	1+0	0
16	FW	(Sweden) SWE	Cassandra Korhonen	4	0	3+0	0	0+0	0	1+0	0
17	DF	(England) ENG	Kiera Skeels	3	0	3+0	0	0+0	0	0+0	0
18	FW	(Hungary) HUN	Gloria Siber	3	0	1+2	0	0+0	0	0+0	0
19	DF	(France) FRA	Hawa Cissoko	3	0	1+1	0	0+0	0	1+0	0
21	GK	(England) ENG	Anna Pederson	0	0	0+0	0	0+0	0	0+0	0
22	MF	(Australia) AUS	Emily van Egmond	4	0	4+0	0	0+0	0	0+0	0
23	DF	(Republic of Ireland) IRL	Lucia Lobato	5	0	3+1	0	0+0	0	0+1	0
24	GK	(Finland) FIN	Anna Koivunen	1	0	0+0	0	0+0	0	1+0	0
25	DF	(England) ENG	Lizzie Waldie	0	0	0+0	0	0+0	0	0+0	0
29	DF	(England) ENG	Ashleigh Neville	2	0	2+0	0	0+0	0	0+0	0
30	DF	(England) ENG	Leighanne Robe	3	0	1+1	0	0+0	0	1+0	0
32	FW	(England) ENG	Angela Nelson-Iye	1	0	0+0	0	0+0	0	0+1	0

=== Goals ===
Rank	Pos.	No.	Player	Women's Super League	FA Cup	League Cup	Total
1	MF	12	(England) Jodie Hutton	1	0	0	1
Total				1	0	0	1

=== Assists ===
Rank	Pos.	No.	Player	Women's Super League	FA Cup	League Cup	Total
1	MF	30	(England) Leighanne Robe	1	0	0	1
Total				1	0	0	1

=== Disciplinary record ===
No.	Pos.	Player	Women's Super League			FA Cup			WSL Players Cup			Total		
No.	Pos.	Player	Yellow card	(yellow card) (yellow-red card)	Red card	Yellow card	(yellow card) (yellow-red card)	Red card	Yellow card	(yellow card) (yellow-red card)	Red card	Yellow card	(yellow card) (yellow-red card)	Red card
1	GK	(Republic of Ireland) Sophie Whitehous	1	0	0	0	0	0	0	0	0	1	0	0
2	DF	(Northern Ireland) Ellie Mason	1	0	0	0	0	0	0	0	0	1	0	0
5	DF	(England) Elisha N'Dow	1	0	0	0	0	0	0	0	0	1	0	0
6	MF	(Australia) Leah Davidson	1	0	0	0	0	0	0	0	0	1	0	0
11	MF	(England) Lucy Fitzgerald	1	0	0	0	0	0	0	0	0	1	0	0
19	DF	(France) Hawa Cissoko	0	1	0	0	0	0	0	0	0	0	1	0
29	DF	(England) Ashleigh Neville	0	0	1	0	0	0	0	0	0	0	0	1
30	DF	(England) Leighanne Robe	1	0	0	0	0	0	0	0	0	1	0	0
Total			6	1	1	0	0	0	0	0	0	6	1	1
