= Anna Koivunen =

Finnish footballer (born 2001)

Personal information
- Full name: Anna Aurora Koivunen
- Date of birth: 6 November 2001 (age 25)
- Place of birth: Turku, Finland
- Height: 1.72 m (5 ft 8 in)
- Position: Goalkeeper

Team information
- Current team: Charlton Athletic
- Number: 35

Youth career
- TPS
- KaaPo

Senior career*
Years	Team	Apps	(Gls)
2014–2015	Pyrkivä Turku	6	(0)
2018	TPS	6	(0)
2019–2020	HJK	38	(0)
2021–2022	Linköping	9	(0)
2023	IFK Kalmar	14	(0)
2023–2024	Brommapojkarna	35	(0)
2025–2026	Djurgården	36	(0)
2026–	Charlton Athletic	0	(0)

International career^{‡}
2018	Finland U17	1	(0)
2019	Finland U18	1	(0)
2019	Finland U19	1	(0)
2021–2024	Finland U23	5	(0)
2024–	Finland	15	(0)
- * Club domestic league appearances and goals as of 23 July 2026 ‡ National team caps and goals as of 15 October 2026

Anna Aurora Koivunen (born 6 November 2001) is a Finnish professional footballer who plays as a goalkeeper for Women's Super League club Charlton Athletic and the Finland national team.

== Career ==
Koivunen started football with Pyrkivä Turku, aged 10. Prior to that, she played also volleyball. She made her senior debut in 2014 with Pyrkivä Turku in the third-tier Naisten Kakkonen, aged 13. Later she joined TPS.

After winning the Finnish championship title and the Finnish Women's Cup with HJK Helsinki in 2019, she left the club after the 2020 season and joined Damallsvenskan club Linköping.

During 2023 and 2024, she played for IFK Kalmar and Brommapojkarna.

On 16 December 2024, Koivunen joined Djurgården from BP.

On 22 July 2026, it was announced that Koivunen had joined Women's Super League club Charlton Athletic. After the signing, she said "I've always wanted to wanted to play in England ... I have many friends playing here, and I have only heard good stories about the league, and obviously all the best players play here, so it’s going to be a huge challenge."

== International career ==
Koivunen played for the Finland U17 national team at the 2018 UEFA Women's Under-17 Championship, where she was named in the Team of the Tournament. Finland finished 3rd in the tournament. She also represented Finland U17 at the 2018 FIFA U-17 Women's World Cup in Uruguay.

She debuted with the Finland national team on 21 February 2024, in a friendly match against the Philippines.

On 19 June 2025, Koivunen was called up to the Finland squad for the UEFA Women's Euro 2025. She kept a clean sheet in the tournament's opening match, in a 1–0 win against Iceland.

== Career statistics ==
=== Club ===
As of 3 July 2025

Appearances and goals by club, season and competition
Club	Season	League			National cup (Note: Includes Finnish Women's Cup and Svenska Cupen women)		Europe		Other		Total	
Club	Season	Division	Apps	Goals	Apps	Goals	Apps	Goals	Apps	Goals	Apps	Goals
Pyrkivä Turku	2014	Naisten Kakkonen	4	0	–		–		–		4	0
Pyrkivä Turku	2015	Naisten Kakkonen	2	0	–		–		–		2	0
Pyrkivä Turku	Total		6	0	0	0	0	0	0	0	6	0
TPS II	2016	Naisten Kolmonen	1	0	–		–		–		1	0
TPS	2018	Naisten Liiga	6	0	1	0	–		–		7	0
HJK	2019	Naisten Liiga	20	0	4	1	–		–		24	1
HJK	2020	Kansallinen Liiga	18	0	3	0	1 (Note: Appearance(s) in UEFA Women's Champions League)	0	–		22	0
HJK	Total		38	0	7	1	1	0	0	0	46	1
Linköping	2021	Damallsvenskan	9	0	1	0	–		–		10	0
Linköping	2022	Damallsvenskan	0	0	1	0	–		–		1	0
Linköping	Total		9	0	2	0	0	0	0	0	11	0
IFK Kalmar	2023	Damallsvenskan	14	0	0	0	–		–		14	0
Brommapojkarna	2023	Damallsvenskan	9	0	–		–		2 (Note: Appearances in Damallsvenskan relegationa play-offs)	0	11	0
Brommapojkarna	2024	Damallsvenskan	26	0	1	0	–		–		27	0
Brommapojkarna	Total		35	0	1	0	0	0	2	0	38	0
Djurgården	2025	Damallsvenskan	25	0	3	0	–		–		28	0
Djurgården	2026	Damallsvenskan	11	0	4	0	–		–		15	0
Djurgården	Total		36	0	7	0	0	0	0	0	43	0
Charlton Athletic	2026–27	WSL	0	0	0	0	–		0	0	0	0
Career total			145	0	18	1	1	0	2	0	166	1

=== International ===
As of 23 July 2026

Appearances and goals by national team and year
National team	Year	Apps	Goals
Finland	2024	1	0
Finland	2025	5	0
Total		6	0

== Honours ==
HJK

- Naisten Liiga: 2019
- Finnish Women's Cup: 2019

Individual

- Football Association of Finland Girl Player of the Year: 2018
