= Lucia Lobato (footballer) =

Personal information
- Date of birth: 23 January 2001 (age 25)
- Place of birth: New York City, United States
- Height: 1.76 m (5 ft 9 in)
- Position: Defender

Team information
- Current team: Charlton Athletic
- Number: 23

Youth career
- Salthill Devon
- Galway WFC Academy

College career
Years	Team	Apps	(Gls)
2019–2020	Akron Zips	23	(2)
2021–2023	Louisiana–Monroe Warhawks	52	(5)

Senior career*
Years	Team	Apps	(Gls)
2016–2023	Galway	48	(3)
2024	Racing Power	12	(1)
2024–2025	Olympique de Marseille	5	(0)
2025–	Charlton Athletic	20	(1)

International career
- Republic of Ireland u17
2018–2019	Republic of Ireland u19		
- * Club domestic league appearances and goals as of 19 October 2026

Lucia Lobato (born 23 January 2001) is a footballer who plays as a defender for Women's Super League club Charlton Athletic.

== College career ==
Lobato played with Akron Zips from 2019 to 2020 and Louisiana–Monroe Warhawks from 2021 to 2023, Majoring in business administration with a concentration in international business.

== Career ==
Lobato played with Galway WFC in the League of Ireland playing with their youth teams and then playing with their senior team from 2016 until 2023 playing with them between college seasons.

In 2024 and 2025 Lobato had spells in Portugal playing with Racing Power in the Portuguese top tier and Olympique de Marseille in the French second tier.

In July 2025 Lobato joined Charlton Athletic in the WSL 2 during the 2025–26 season she scored one goal and helped Charlton to promotion to the Women's Super League after a penalty shoutout win against Leicester City at The Valley Irish teammate Sophie Whitehouse saving four penalties in the shoutout, Lobato signed a new contract with Charlton ahead of their maiden WSL season.

== Personal life ==
Lobato was born in the Bronx but moved and grew up in Galway and played youth soccer for Salthill Devon and Galway WFC. She is also eligible to play for El Salvador.
