= Linda Líf Boama =

Icelandic footballer (born 2001)

Personal information
- Date of birth: 15 August 2001 (age 25)
- Place of birth: Iceland
- Position: Forward

Team information
- Current team: Charlton Athletic
- Number: 13

College career
Years	Team	Apps	(Gls)
2020–2021	Boston College Eagles	19	(8)

Senior career*
Years	Team	Apps	(Gls)
2017–2018	HK/Víkingur	20	(3)
2019–2021	Þróttur Reykjavík	33	(25)
2023–2025	Víkingur Reykjavík	49	(18)
2026	Kristianstad	7	(5)
2026–	Charlton Athletic	0	(0)

International career^{‡}
2026–	Iceland	2	(0)
- * Club domestic league appearances and goals as of 31 May 2026 ‡ National team caps and goals as of 18 April 2026

Linda Líf Boama (born 15 August 2001) is an Icelandic professional footballer who plays as a forward for Women’s Super League club Charlton Athletic and the Iceland national team.

== Early life and college career ==
Boama was born on 15 August 2001 in Reykjavík, Iceland, to a Ghanaian father and an Icelandic mother. She has stated that 13—her shirt number for Charlton Athletic—is for her mother, whose birthday is 13 December.

Between 2020 and 2021, Boama attended Boston College in the United States on a scholarship. In August 2021, she was named Atlantic Coast Conference's Offensive Player of the Week.

== Youth career ==
In 2014, Boama, age 14, joined the youth team of HK/Víkingur in her native Reykjavík. She achieved a number of titles at under-16, under-17, and under-19 levels.

== Club career ==
=== HK/Víkingur, 2017–19 ===
In 2017, Boama made her senior debut for HK/Víkingur at the age of 16. Helping the club achieve promotion from the 1. deild kvenna (second tier league) to the Besta deild kvenna in her second season, Boama made 41 appearances for Víkingur across all competitions.

=== Þróttur, 2019–20 ===
She signed for Icelandic side Þróttur in 2019, where she made thirty-three league appearances and scored twenty-five goals and helped the club achieve promotion from the second tier to the top flight. In 2020, she suffered a broken collarbone which ruled her out of the second-half of the season. She departed the club in the summer to study and play for Boston College.

=== Víkingur, 2023–25 ===
On 20 January 2023, she signed for Icelandic side Víkingur Reykjavík (previously known as HK/Víkingur), where she had begun her career. Boama made forty-nine league appearances and scored eighteen goals in her second stint at the club.

=== Kristianstads DFF, 2025–26 ===
On 8 November 2025, Boama signed for Swedish side Kristianstads DFF on a three-year deal.

=== Charlton Athletic, 2026– ===
On 29 August 2026, Boama joined recently-promoted Women's Super League team Charlton Athletic on a three-year contract. Her signing marked a record fee for Charlton, and one of the highest fees earned for Kristianstads DFF.

== International career ==
During the spring of 2026, Boama played for the Iceland women's national football team for 2027 FIFA Women's World Cup qualification.

== Personal life ==
Boama has described Sif Atladóttir as her idol.

== Career statistics ==
=== Club ===
As of match played 22 August 2026

Appearances and goals by club, season and competition
Club	Season	League			Cup (Note: Includes the Icelandic Women's Football Cup, Reykjavíkurmót - Meistaraflokkur,Svenska Cupen, and Women's FA Cup)		League Cup (Note: Includes the Icelandic Women's Football League Cup and WSL Players Cup)		Europe		Total	
Club	Season	Division	Apps	Goals	Apps	Goals	Apps	Goals	Apps	Goals	Apps	Goals
HK/Víkingur	2017	Besta deild kvenna	11	3	5	0	5	5	—		21	8
HK/Víkingur	2018	Besta deild kvenna	9	0	5	0	4	1	—		18	1
HK/Víkingur	2019	Inkasso-deild kvenna	18	22	7	4	6	5	—		31	31
HK/Víkingur	Total		38	25	17	4	14	11	0	0	70	40
Þróttur	2020	Besta deild kvenna	6	1	1	0	0	0	—		7	1
Þróttur	2021	Besta deild kvenna	9	3	6	4	0	0	—		15	7
Þróttur	2023	Besta deild kvenna	0	0	1	2	0	0	—		1	2
Þróttur	Total		15	4	8	6	0	0	0	0	23	10
Víkingur	2023	Lengjudeild kvenna	14	4	4	1	0	0	—		18	5
Víkingur	2024	Besta deild kvenna	16	6	0	0	0	0	—		16	6
Víkingur	2025	Besta deild kvenna	20	8	3	1	5	2	—		28	11
Víkingur	Total		50	18	7	2	5	2	0	0	62	22
Kristianstads DFF	2026	Damallsvenskan	14	6	4	2	—		—		18	8
Charlton Athletic	2026–27	WSL	0	0	0	0	0	0	—		0	0
Total			118	53	36	14	19	13	0	0	173	80

=== International goals ===
No.	Date	Venue	Opponent	Score	Result	Competition
1.	9 June 2026	Laugardalsvöllur, Reykjavík, Iceland	Spain	1–4	1–6	2027 FIFA Women's World Cup qualification
