= Paula Partido =

Spanish footballer (born 2005)

Personal information
- Full name: Paula Partido Durán
- Date of birth: 2 March 2005 (age 21)
- Place of birth: Rivas-Vaciamadrid, Spain
- Height: 1.70 m (5 ft 7 in)
- Position: Midfielder

Team information
- Current team: Charlton Athletic (on loan from London City Lionesses)

Youth career
- 2013–2015: CD Covibar
- 2015–2017: Rivas FC
- 2017–2019: Madrid CFF
- 2019–2021: TACÓN / Real Madrid

Senior career*
| Years | Team | Apps | (Gls) |
| 2020–2023 | Real Madrid B | 49 | (15) |
| 2022–2025 | Real Madrid | 2 | (0) |
| 2023–2024 | → Celtic (loan) | 23 | (3) |
| 2024–2025 | → Sevilla (loan) | 19 | (1) |
| 2025– | London City Lionesses | 0 | (0) |
| 2025–2026 | → Dux Logroño (loan) | 16 | (1) |
| 2026– | → Charlton Athletic (loan) | 0 | (0) |

International career^{‡}
| 2021–2022 | Spain U17 | 18 | (1) |
| 2023– | Spain U20 | 2 | (0) |
- * Club domestic league appearances and goals as of 25 January 2026 ‡ National team caps and goals as of 24 May 2024

Paula Partido Durán (Spanish: [ˈpaula paɾˈtido duˈɾan]; born 2 March 2005) is a Spanish footballer who plays as a midfielder for Women's Super League club Charlton Athletic on loan from London City Lionesses.

== Early life ==
Partido started her career with Spanish side Real Madrid. She debuted for the club's first team at the age of 16.

== Club career ==
In 2023, Partido was sent on loan to Scottish side Celtic. She made 23 league appearances and scored three goals as the club won the Scottish Women's Premier League title on the final matchday.

=== London City Lionesses ===
On 2 August 2025, It was announced that Partido had joined the London City Lionesses, who had signed the 20-year-old Spanish midfielder from Real Madrid on a three-year contract.

==== Loan to Dux Logroño, 2025–2026 ====
On 8 August 2025, Partido joined Dux Logroño on loan. On 31 January 2026, she was recalled from loan to rejoin the Lionesses and from 15 March 2026, she was on the bench for her home team.

==== Loan to Charlton Athletic, 2026–present ====
On 18 July 2026, it was announced that Partido would be joining Charlton Athletic on loan for the 2026–27 season.

== International career ==
Partido has represented Spain internationally at youth levels. She helped the team win the 2022 FIFA U-17 Women's World Cup.

== Style of play ==
Partido mainly operates as an attacking midfielder and can also play on the wing. She is known for her dribbling ability.

== Career statistics ==
=== Club ===
As of match played 31 March 2024

Appearances and goals by club, season and competition
| Club | Season | League | | | National cup (Note: Includes Copa de la Reina, Scottish Cup) | | League cup (Note: Includes Scottish Premier League Cup) | | Continental (Note: Includes UEFA Women's Champions League) | | Other | | Total | |
| Club | Season | Division | Apps | Goals | Apps | Goals | Apps | Goals | Apps | Goals | Apps | Goals | Apps | Goals |
|---|---|---|---|---|---|---|---|---|---|---|---|---|---|---|
| Real Madrid | 2021–22 | Primera División | 2 | 0 | 1 | 0 | — | | 1 | 0 | 0 | 0 | 4 | 0 |
| Real Madrid | 2022–23 | Liga F | 0 | 0 | 1 | 1 | — | | 1 | 1 | 0 | 0 | 2 | 2 |
| Real Madrid | Total | | 2 | 0 | 2 | 1 | — | | 2 | 1 | 0 | 0 | 6 | 2 |
| Celtic (loan) | 2023–24 | Scottish Women's Premier League | 23 | 3 | 2 | 0 | 3 | 1 | 2 | 0 | — | | 30 | 4 |
| Career total | | | 25 | 3 | 4 | 1 | 3 | 1 | 4 | 1 | 0 | 0 | 36 | 6 |
