= Carla Humphrey =

English footballer (born 1996)

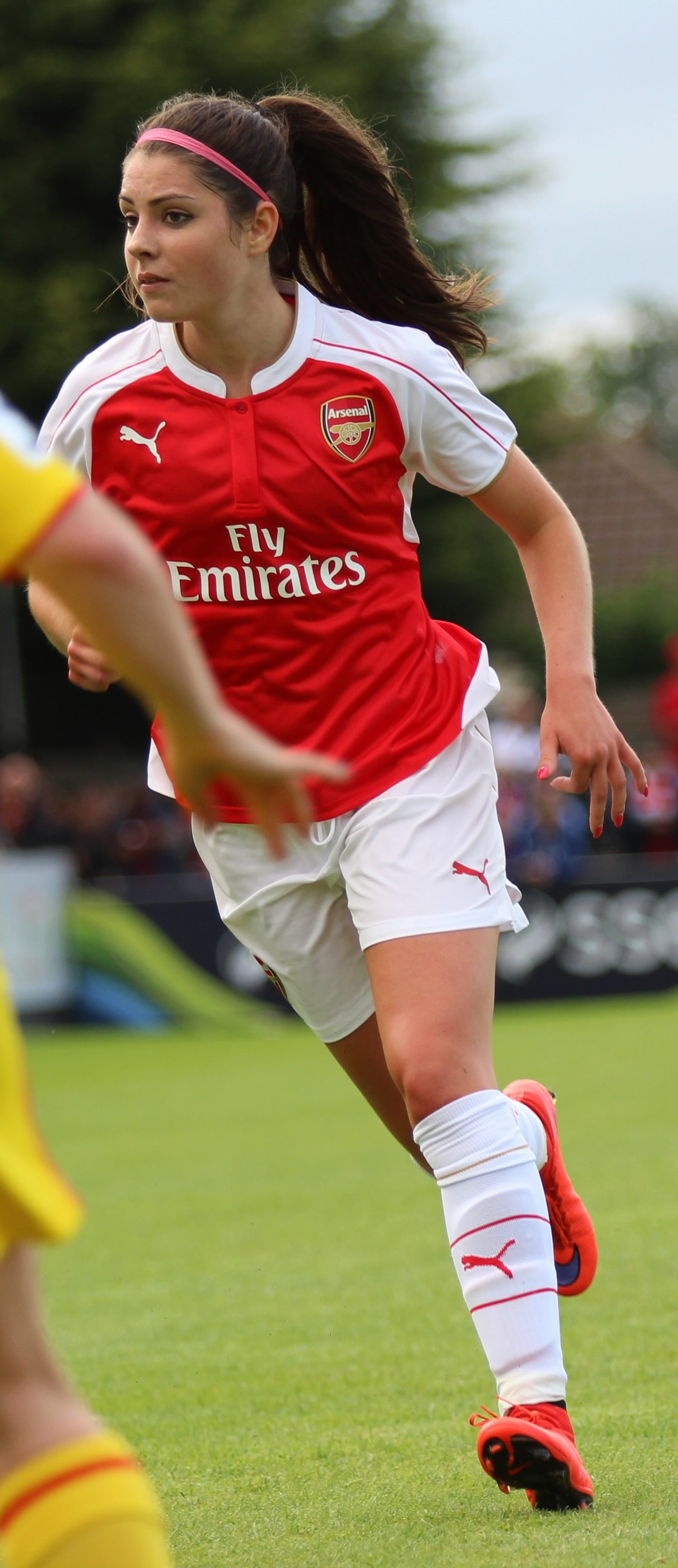
- Carla Humphrey playing for Arsenal in 2015

Personal information
- Full name: Carla Elise Humphrey
- Date of birth: 15 December 1996 (age 29)
- Place of birth: Brampton, Cambridgeshire, England
- Height: 1.68 m (5 ft 6 in)
- Positions: Forward; midfielder

Team information
- Current team: Charlton Athletic
- Number: 8

Youth career
- Brampton
- Rushden & Diamonds
- 2005–2015: Arsenal

Senior career*
| Years | Team | Apps | (Gls) |
| 2015–2017 | Arsenal | 8 | (2) |
| 2016 | → Doncaster Rovers Belles (loan) | 15 | (1) |
| 2017–2021 | Bristol City | 64 | (0) |
| 2021–2023 | Liverpool | 20 | (0) |
| 2023– | Charlton Athletic | 26 | (2) |

International career^{‡}
| 2010 | England U15 | 2 | (0) |
| 2011–2012 | England U17 | 5 | (1) |
| 2013–2015 | England U19 | 13 | (1) |
| 2016 | England U20 | 3 | (0) |
| 2016 | England U23 | 2 | (0) |
- * Club domestic league appearances and goals as of 01:26, 27 October 2024 ‡ National team caps and goals as of 8 September 2019

Carla Elise Humphrey (born 15 December 1996) is an English professional footballer who plays as a midfielder for Women's Super League club Charlton Athletic.

== Early and personal life ==
Humphrey attended secondary school and sixth-form at Hinchingbrooke School in Cambridgeshire

In April 2025, Humphrey announced that she was pregnant with her first child, ruling her out for the majority of the 2025–26 Women's Super League 2 season.

== Club career ==
Humphrey started playing football for her local boys' team at Brampton followed by two years with Rushden & Diamonds. She joined the Arsenal Ladies Centre of Excellence in 2006 and progressed through the age groups. Humphrey impressed through her time at the academy winning the FA Youth cup twice, the U17 league and the FA Development league. During her final season in the FA WSL Development League Southern Division, she was the top scorer with 22 goals in 20 games and was voted the Players’ Player of the Year.

Humphrey signed her first professional contract with Arsenal in February 2015. Following a 2015 season where she saw limited playing time, Humphrey went on loan to the Doncaster Rovers Belles for the 2016 FA WSL season. She returned to Arsenal for the 2017 FA WSL Spring Series. Following this series, Humphrey signed for Bristol City ahead of the 2017–18 season.

Humphrey signed for Liverpool in July 2021, helping the club to promotion back to the Women's Super League in her first season.

In August 2023, Humphrey signed a two-year deal with Charlton Athletic. On 5 July 2024, she signed a new two year contract with the club.

== International career ==
At international level, Humphrey has represented England at under-15, under-16, under-17, under-19, under-20 and most recently under-23 level.

== Career statistics ==
=== Club ===
As of match played 23 May 2026

Appearances and goals by club, season and competition
| Club | Season | League | | | FA Cup | | League Cup | | Other | | Total | |
| Club | Season | Division | Apps | Goals | Apps | Goals | Apps | Goals | Apps | Goals | Apps | Goals |
|---|---|---|---|---|---|---|---|---|---|---|---|---|
| Arsenal | 2014 | Women's Super League | 0 | 0 | 0 | 0 | 0 | 0 | 0 | 0 | 0 | 0 |
| Arsenal | 2015 | Women's Super League | 6 | 2 | 0 | 0 | 4 | 1 | 0 | 0 | 10 | 3 |
| Arsenal | 2016 | Women's Super League | 0 | 0 | 0 | 0 | 0 | 0 | 0 | 0 | 0 | 0 |
| Arsenal | 2017 | Women's Super League | 2 | 0 | 0 | 0 | 0 | 0 | 0 | 0 | 2 | 0 |
| Arsenal | Total | | 8 | 2 | 0 | 0 | 4 | 1 | 0 | 0 | 12 | 3 |
| Doncaster Rovers Belles (loan) | 2016 | Women's Super League | 15 | 1 | 0 | 0 | 2 | 0 | 0 | 0 | 17 | 1 |
| Bristol City | 2017–18 | Women's Super League | 15 | 0 | 0 | 0 | 5 | 0 | 0 | 0 | 20 | 0 |
| Bristol City | 2018–19 | Women's Super League | 20 | 0 | 1 | 0 | 5 | 0 | 0 | 0 | 16 | 0 |
| Bristol City | 2019–20 | Women's Super League | 8 | 0 | 0 | 0 | 3 | 1 | 0 | 0 | 11 | 1 |
| Bristol City | 2020–21 | Women's Super League | 21 | 0 | 1 | 0 | 5 | 0 | 0 | 0 | 27 | 0 |
| Bristol City | Total | | 64 | 0 | 1 | 0 | 18 | 1 | 0 | 0 | 84 | 1 |
| Liverpool | 2021–22 | Women's Championship | 12 | 0 | 3 | 0 | 5 | 0 | 0 | 0 | 18 | 0 |
| Liverpool | 2022–23 | Women's Super League | 8 | 0 | 0 | 0 | 4 | 0 | 0 | 0 | 12 | 0 |
| Liverpool | Total | | 20 | 0 | 3 | 0 | 9 | 0 | 0 | 0 | 30 | 0 |
| Charlton Athletic | 2023–24 | Women's Championship | 20 | 2 | 2 | 0 | 3 | 1 | 0 | 0 | 25 | 3 |
| Charlton Athletic | 2024–25 | Women's Championship | 6 | 0 | 0 | 0 | 1 | 0 | 0 | 0 | 7 | 0 |
| Charlton Athletic | 2025–26 | Women's Super League 2 | 0 | 0 | 0 | 0 | 0 | 0 | 1 | 0 | 1 | 0 |
| Charlton Athletic | 2026–27 | Women's Super League | 0 | 0 | 0 | 0 | 0 | 0 | 0 | 0 | 0 | 0 |
| Charlton Athletic | Total | | 26 | 2 | 2 | 0 | 3 | 1 | 1 | 0 | 33 | 3 |
| Career total | | | 133 | 5 | 6 | 0 | 36 | 3 | 1 | 0 | 176 | 8 |

== Honours ==
Liverpool F.C.

- FA Women's Championship: 2021–22

Arsenal F.C.

- FA Women's League Cup: 2015
