= Lucy Fitzgerald =

Lucy Fitzgerald may refer to:

- Lucy Anne FitzGerald (1771–1851), Anglo-Irish political radical
- Lucy Fitzgerald (footballer) (born 2000), English footballer
