= Lauren Haynes (footballer) =

English footballer (born 1995

Personal information
- Date of birth: 15 September 1995 (age 31)
- Position: Midfielder

Senior career*
Years	Team	Apps	(Gls)
2013	Bristol Academy		
2015	Aston Villa		
2016–2018	Oxford United		

International career
2010–2011	England U17		
- * Club domestic league appearances and goals

Lauren Haynes (born 15 September 1995) is an English footballer who plays as a midfielder for Sion Swifts Ladies F.C.
