= Eastleigh Ladies F.C. =

- Full name: Eastleigh Ladies Football Club
- Nickname: The Spitfires
- Founded: 2007; 19 years ago as Eastleigh Ladies F.C. June 2016; 10 years ago, as Eastleigh Ladies F.C.
- Ground: Ten Acres
- Capacity: 5,192 (2,700 seated)
- Club secretary: Michael Castle
- Manager: Ashley Healey
- Website: www.eastleighfc.com/ladies-football/
Home colours	Away colours

Eastleigh L.F.C. is an English women's football club affiliated with Eastleigh Football Club based in Eastleigh, Hampshire. They currently compete in the Southern Region Women's Football League First Southern, following back-to-back promotions from the Hampshire County Women's Football League Division One, and the Southern Region Women's Football League Division 1.

== History ==
Originally formed in 2007, Eastleigh Ladies joined the Hampshire County Women's Football League in its third season. For the 2007–08 season, the club was admitted into Division Two of the Hampshire County Women's League, and won promotion to the Hampshire County Women's League Division One after finishing as champions ahead of 2nd-placed Rushmoor Community in its inaugural season. The following two seasons saw the Spitfires finish in a respectable 4th place in Division One. At the end of the 2010–11 season, Eastleigh were crowned champions for the second time since the clubs' inception back in 2007, beating QK Southampton Ladies to the Division title with only three points separating both teams. However the next season brought about the end of the women's side due to a lack of facilities which saw the team disband.

== Re-founding ==
The team was re-founded in 2016 and won both the Hampshire County Women's Football League Division One championship, and the Southern Region Women's Football League Division 1 championship in its first two seasons. The spitfires season's following 19/20 and 20/21 were curtailed due to COVID-19. However, with manager Ashley Healey and Assistant manager Brad Walsh they led the club to its first Cup final and one of its most successful seasons to date.

== Squad ==
Note: Flags indicate national team as defined under FIFA eligibility rules; some limited exceptions apply. Players may hold more than one non-FIFA nationality.

No.	Pos.	Nation	Player
—	GK	USA	Daniela Ford
—		ENG	Hollie Agombar
—		ENG	Nicola Beeton (captain)
—			Lucy Venables
—		ENG	Samantha Hide
—			Lauren Hill
—			Emily Gardiner
—			Chelsea Bates
—			Amber O’Reilly
—			Emma Simpson

No.	Pos.	Nation	Player
—		ENG	Leah Shave
—		ENG	Kat Littleboy
—			Lucy Nightingale
—			Meg Cave
—			Manuela Naprta
—			Catherine Browning
—			Nicky Curtis
—			Tiffany Newland

== Honours ==
=== Regional ===
- Hampshire County Women's Football League Division Two:
  - Winners (1): 2007–08
- Hampshire County Women's Football League Division One:
  - Winners (1): 2010–11
  - Runners-up (1): 2016–17
- Hampshire County Women's Football League Cup
  - Runners-up (1): 2016–17
