= Rakel Hönnudóttir =

Icelandic footballer (born 1988)

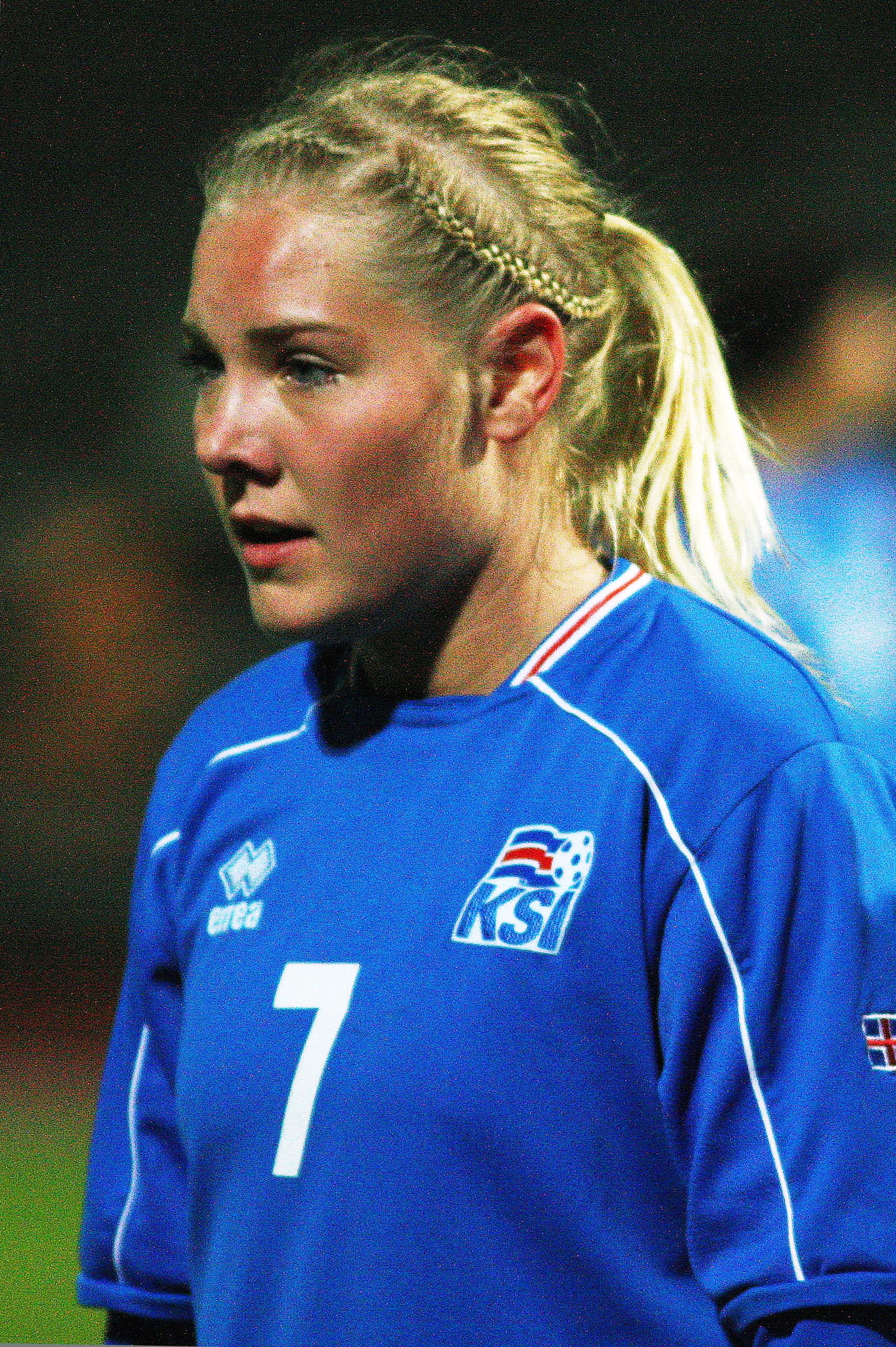
- Rakel Hönnudóttir in 2009

Personal information
- Date of birth: 30 December 1988 (age 37)
- Place of birth: Akureyri, Iceland
- Height: 1.68 m (5 ft 6 in)
- Positions: Striker; midfielder

Team information
- Current team: Breiðablik
- Number: 22

Senior career*
Years	Team	Apps	(Gls)
2004–2005	Þór/KA/KS	21	(29)
2006–2011	Þór/KA	97	(76)
2009	→ Brøndby IF (loan)		
2012–2017	Breiðablik	103	(46)
2018	IF Limhamn Bunkeflo	18	(8)
2019	Reading	9	(0)
2020–	Breiðablik	12	(5)

International career^{‡}
2006–2007	Iceland U-19	7	(2)
2008–	Iceland	103	(9)
- * Club domestic league appearances and goals as of 9 December 2019 ‡ National team caps and goals as of 1 December 2020

Rakel Hönnudóttir (born 30 December 1988) is an Icelandic footballer who plays as a striker for Besta deild kvenna club Breiðablik and the Iceland national team. She represented her country at the UEFA Women's Championship in 2009 and 2013. Despite being a striker, she has seldom played as one for the national team, even featuring at right back.

== Club career ==
Rakel was born and grew up in Akureyri, a city in North Iceland. Throughout her youth club career she played for Þór up until 2006 when the two biggest football teams in Akureyri decided to join their women's teams and call them Þór/KA. In January 2009 Rakel went on loan to Brøndby IF of the Danish Elitedivisionen. She became the first foreign player at Brøndby's female section, who were the reigning national champions. She returned to Iceland in April and continued playing for Þór/KA in the Úrvalsdeild. She played in the Champions League with Þór/KA.

In November 2011, Rakel signed with Breiðablik where she remained for six seasons. At Breiðablik, Rakel scored a total of 46 goals in 103 league appearances. She spent the 2018 Damallsvenskan season in Sweden with IF Limhamn Bunkeflo, before signing for English FA WSL club Reading in January 2019. In December 2019, Rakel ended her 11-month spell with Reading and returned to Iceland with Breiðablik.

== International career ==
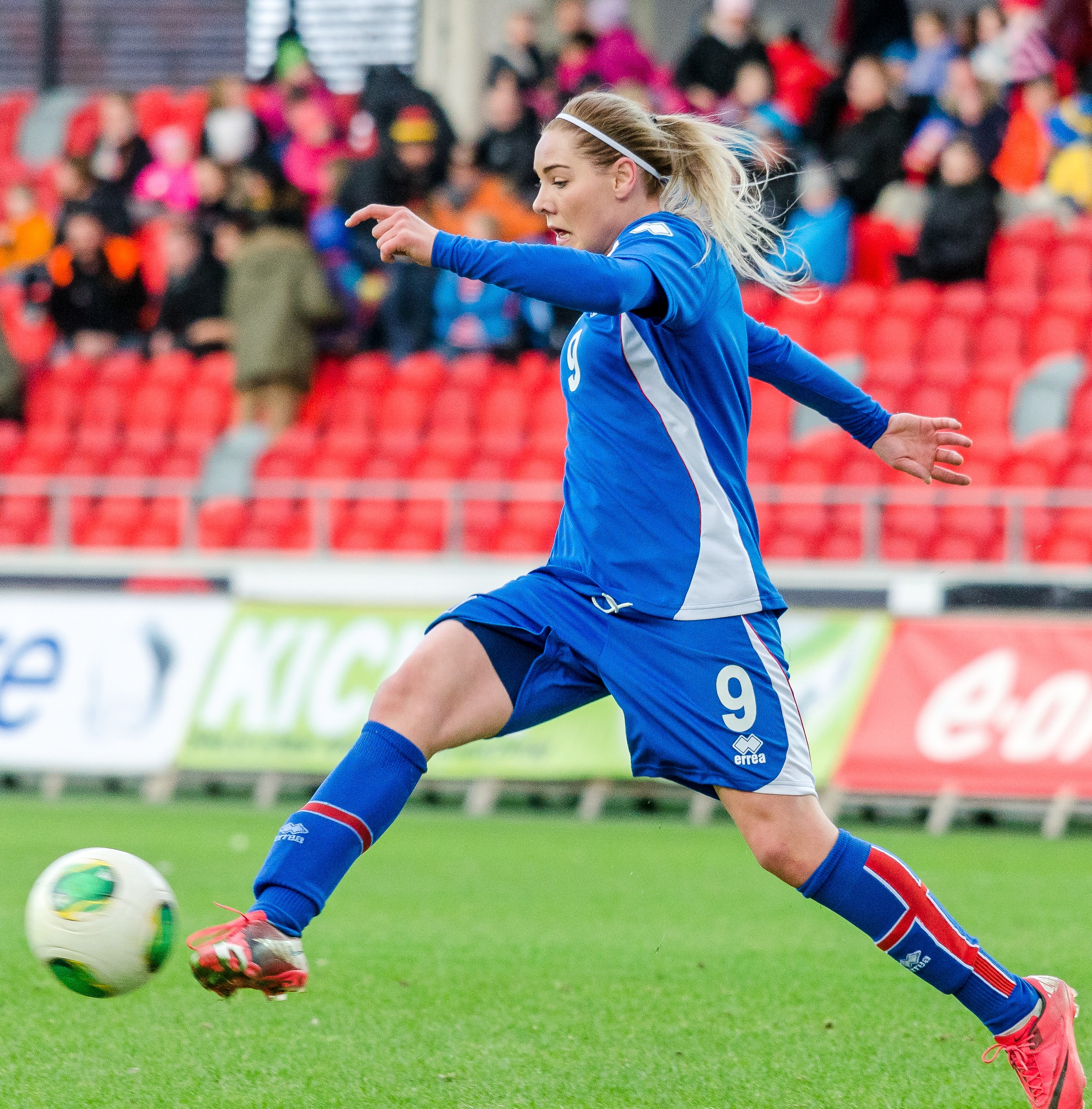
Rakel Hönnudóttir playing an international friendly against Sweden at Myresjöhus Arena in Växjö, 6 April 2013

Rakel made her senior international debut for Iceland at the 2008 Algarve Cup; in a 2–0 win over Poland. At UEFA Women's Euro 2009, Rakel featured in all three matches as Iceland were eliminated in the first round. Four years later, national team coach Siggi Eyjólfsson selected Rakel in the Iceland squad for UEFA Women's Euro 2013. She retained her place in the national team squad for UEFA Women's Euro 2017, but this time remained an unused substitute as Iceland exited at the group stage.

At the time of her transfer to Reading in January 2019, Rakel had 94 caps for Iceland and seven goals. On 2 September 2019, she made her 100th international appearance against Slovakia.

== Honors and awards ==
Rakel was selected the most promising player of the year in the Icelandic Úrvalsdeild in 2007 where the coaches and captains of the teams got to cast their vote. In 2008 Rakel was named the player of the year by Þór/KA women's team. That same year she was named the best female soccer player of the year by Þór and Akureyri's athlete of the year.
