= Lizzie Waldie =

English footballer (born 2000)

- Waldie in 2024

Personal information
- Full name: Elizabeth Margaret Waldie
- Date of birth: 9 June 2000 (age 26)
- Place of birth: London, England
- Position: Defender

Team information
- Current team: Charlton Athletic
- Number: 25

Youth career
- Ebbsfleet United
- Millwall Lionesses
- Dartford
- Kent Football United

Senior career*
Years	Team	Apps	(Gls)
–2019	Kent Football United		
2019–2023	Crystal Palace	59	(5)
2023–2026	Heart of Midlothian	39	(4)
2026–	Charlton Athletic	1	(0)
- * Club domestic league appearances and goals as of 18:43, 26 October 2026 (UTC)

Elizabeth "Lizzie" Margaret Waldie (born 9 June 2000) is an English professional footballer who plays as a defender for Women's Super League club Charlton Athletic. She has previously played for Crystal Palace and Heart of Midlothian.

== Early life ==
Elizabeth Margaret Waldie was born on 9 June 2000 in London, England.

In 2016, Waldie was a part of the newly-formed collaboration between Leigh Academy and Dartford Football Club which allowed academy players to partake in an academic course alongside their football training.

== Youth career ==
Waldie began her youth career with Ebbsfleet United, during her time with Ebbsfleet, she won several league titles. Waldie spent a year playing for Millwall Lionesses. She then spent time with the youth teams of Dartford and Kent Football United, where she won the Tina Marshall Cup and Capital League Cup respectively.

== Senior career ==
=== Kent Football United ===
Having played for the club's under-17 team, Waldie began her senior career with Kent Football United. With Kent, Waldie won the South East Counties Women's League Premier Division title in 2017–18 and 2018–19, and also won the Kent Reliance Women's Cup in 2017–18.

=== Crystal Palace, 2019–23 ===
Ahead of the 2019–20 Women's Championship season, Waldie joined Crystal Palace. Waldie would later go on to describe Palace as her "first proper professional team." On 12 September 2020, Waldie scored during a 1–1 draw to London City Lionesses.

On 2 May 2021, Waldie scored a late second-half goal to secure Crystal Palace a 2–1 win over Lewes, the club's first time securing back-to-back home wins that year.

In May 2023, Waldie was named the Women's Championship Unsung Hero of the Season at the On Her Side Awards. On 28 June 2023, Crystal Palace announced that Waldie would depart the club upon the expiration of her contract that month in order to "take up a new challenge elsewhere."

=== Heart of Midlothian, 2023–26 ===
==== 2023–24 ====
On 18 July 2023, Waldie joined Scottish Women's Premier League (SWPL) team Heart of Midlothian on a one-year deal. On 13 August 2023 — the opening day of the 2023–24 SWPL season — Waldie made her club debut as Hearts beat Hamilton 4–0, with Waldie scoring her first goal for the team within three minutes. For her performance, she was named to the SWPL Team of the Week. On 11 February 2024, Waldie scored again in Hearts's 4–0 victory over Aberdeen; she was again named to the SWPL Team of the Week. On 10 March 2024, Waldie scored the single goal in a 1–0 victory over Partick Thistle to secure Hearts's place in the 2023–24 Scottish Cup semi-final round. On 1 May 2024, Waldie signed a new contract with Hearts, keeping her at the club until the summer of 2026. With Hearts, Waldie competed in the final of the Scottish Cup; it was the club's first major final. Hearts were beaten 0–2 by Rangers.

==== 2024–25 ====
For her performance in Hearts's 3–0 win over Aberdeen on 15 September 2024, where she completed more passes than any other player in the league that weekend, Waldie was named to the SWPL Team of the Week and the BBC Sport Scotland's SWPL Team of the Week. On 18 August 2024, Waldie scored in Hearts's 5–0 victory over rival Edinburgh team Spartans and was named to the SWPL's Team of the Week, with Jack Donnelly describing her goal as "[almost] a reward for a resolute defensive performance." On 26 November 2024, she was again chosen for BBC Sport Scotland's SWPL Team of the Week for her role in Hearts's 2–0 victory over Aberdeen. For her performance in Hearts's 0–0 draw to Motherwell on 22 December 2024, Waldie was named to the SWPL Team of the Week for Hearts's, where she was described as "one of the SWPL's top centre backs." On 2 March 2025, she provided two assists during a 2–2 draw to Rangers, and was again named to the SWPL Team of the Week. On 10 March 2025, Waldie was sent off in Hearts's 2–3 Scottish Cup loss to Glasgow City after receiving a second yellow card shortly before the end of regulation time. For her performance in Hearts's 2–1 Edinburgh derby victory on 13 April 2025, Waldie was selected to BBC Sport Scotland's SWPL Team of the Week. She was included in the SWPL Team of the Week for Hearts's matches on 16 April 2025 (a 2–0 victory over Motherwell) and 20 April 2025 (a 0–0 draw to Glasgow City).

==== 2025 ====
On 24 August 2025, Waldie provided an assist in Hearts's 2–2 draw with Rangers and was later named to BBC Sport Scotland's SWPL Team of the Week. On 12 October 2025, Waldie provided an assist in a crushing 7–0 triumph over Montrose which led her to be selected to BBC Sport Scotland's SWPL Team of the Week. On 19 October 2025, Waldie provided an assist in Hearts's 5–1 win over Aberdeen; she was named to the SWPL Team of the Week for her performance. She made the SWPL Team of the Week for her role in Hearts's 3–0 victory over Motherwell on 14 December 2025.

=== Charlton Athletic, 2026– ===
==== 2026 ====
On 10 January 2026, Waldie joined Women's Super League 2 (WSL2) side Charlton Athletic on a two-year deal running until 2027. Having finished the 2025–26 WSL2 season in third place, Charlton participated in a promotion play-off against Leicester City, who had placed 12th in the WSL. Waldie was an unused substitute as Charlton beat Leicester 2–1 in a penalty shoot-out to secure promotion to the WSL for the 2026–27 season.

==== 2026–27 ====
On 22 October 2026, Waldie scored her first goal for Charlton in a 2–0 Players Cup victory over Bristol City.

== Career statistics ==
As of match played 21 October 2026

Appearances and goals by club, season and competition
Club	Season	League			Cup (Note: Includes the Women's FA Cup, and Women's Scottish Cup)		League Cup (Note: Includes the WSL Cup/Women's League Cup, and Scottish Women's Premier League Cup)		Total	
Club	Season	Division	Apps	Goals	Apps	Goals	Apps	Goals	Apps	Goals
Crystal Palace	2019–20	Women's Championship	5	0	—		2	0	7	0
Crystal Palace	2020–21	Women's Championship	18	2	—		4	0	22	2
Crystal Palace	2021–22	Women's Championship	20	2	—		1	0	21	2
Crystal Palace	2022–23	Women's Championship	16	1	1	0	3	0	20	1
Crystal Palace	Total		59	5	1	0	10	0	70	5
Heart of Midlothian	2023–24	SWPL	29	3	—		1	0	30	3
Heart of Midlothian	2024–25	SWPL	30	1	1	0	—		31	1
Heart of Midlothian	2025–26	SWPL	11	0	2	0	—		13	0
Heart of Midlothian	Total		70	4	3	0	1	0	74	4
Charlton Athletic	2025–26	WSL2	1	0	2	0	— (Note: Waldie joined Charlton after they had been eliminated from the 2025–26 Women's League Cup)		3	0
Charlton Athletic	2026–27	WSL	0	0	0	0	2	1	2	1
Charlton Athletic	Total		1	0	2	0	2	1	5	1
Career total			130	9	6	0	13	1	149	10

== Honours ==
=== Dartford ===
- Tina Marshall Cup

=== Kent Football United ===
- Capital League Cup
- FA South East Counties Women's League Premier Division: 2017–18
- FA London and South East Women's Regional Football League: 2018–19
- Kent Reliance Women's Cup: 2017–18
