= Sophie Whitehouse =

English footballer (born 1996)

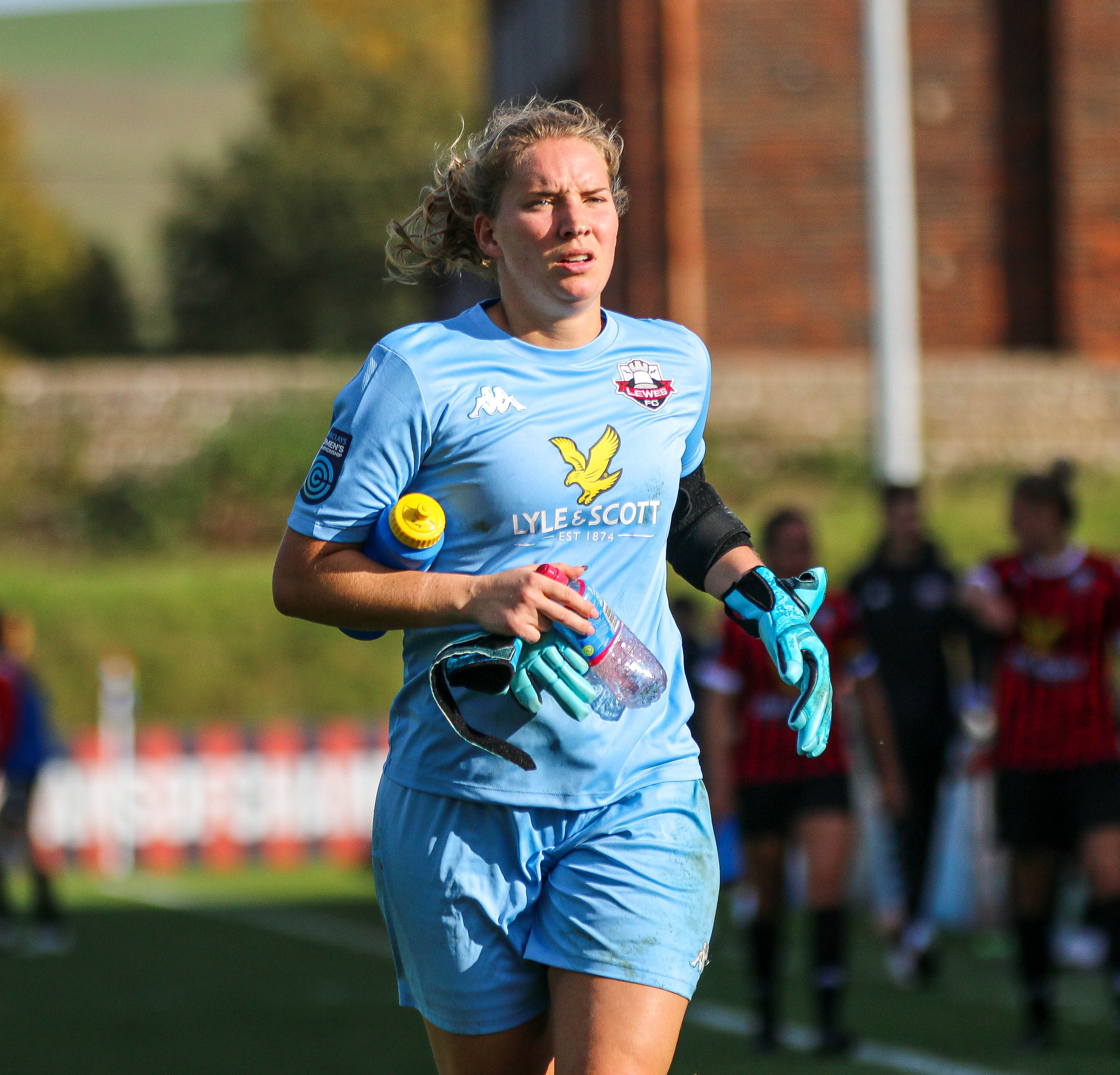
- Playing for Lewes in 2022

Personal information
- Full name: Sophie Elizabeth Verney Whitehouse
- Date of birth: 10 October 1996 (age 30)
- Place of birth: Enfield, England
- Height: 1.73 m (5 ft 8 in)
- Position: Goalkeeper

Team information
- Current team: Charlton Athletic
- Number: 1

Youth career
- Potomac Hotspurs
- 2011–2015: Washington International Red Devils

College career
Years	Team	Apps	(Gls)
2015–2018	Columbia Lions	41	(0)
2019	Santa Clara Broncos	13	(0)

Senior career*
Years	Team	Apps	(Gls)
2020–2021	Tottenham Hotspur	0	(0)
2021	Birmingham City	2	(0)
2021–2022	Bristol City	6	(0)
2022–2024	Lewes	43	(0)
2024–	Charlton Athletic	39	(0)

International career^{‡}
2025–	Republic of Ireland	1	(0)
- * Club domestic league appearances and goals as of 1 July 2026 ‡ National team caps and goals as of 1 July 2026

Sophie Elizabeth Verney Whitehouse (born 10 October 1996) is a professional footballer who plays as a goalkeeper for Women's Super League club Charlton Athletic. Born in England, she was chosen to represent the Republic of Ireland at international level.

== Early life ==
Whitehouse was born in Enfield, London, in 1996 to an Irish mother, Caroline Sergeant, and an English father. She also has a sister, Grace. When she was three months old, the family moved to East Africa for her mother's work in public health development. They lived in Kenya for four years before later relocating to Tanzania. At the age of nine, her family moved to Washington, D.C. in the United States for her mother's work at the World Bank. She attended Washington International School, where she was a four-year letter-winner in football, basketball and softball. She began her high school football career as a goalkeeper before transitioning to a midfielder for her junior and senior seasons, in both of which she served as captain. She also played as a goalkeeper for the Potomac Hotspurs club team.

From 2015 to 2018, Whitehouse was a goalkeeper for the Lions women's football team of Columbia University in New York City, though she redshirted in her freshman season in 2015. For the 2019 season, she transferred to Santa Clara University in California as a graduate student and made thirteen appearances for the Broncos.

== Club career ==
=== Early career ===
She moved to the United Kingdom where she joined Tottenham Hotspur F.C. Women in 2020, however she did not make an appearance. She had a transfer to Birmingham City W.F.C. where she played the last four months of that season. In the following season she joined Bristol City W.F.C.

=== Lewes ===
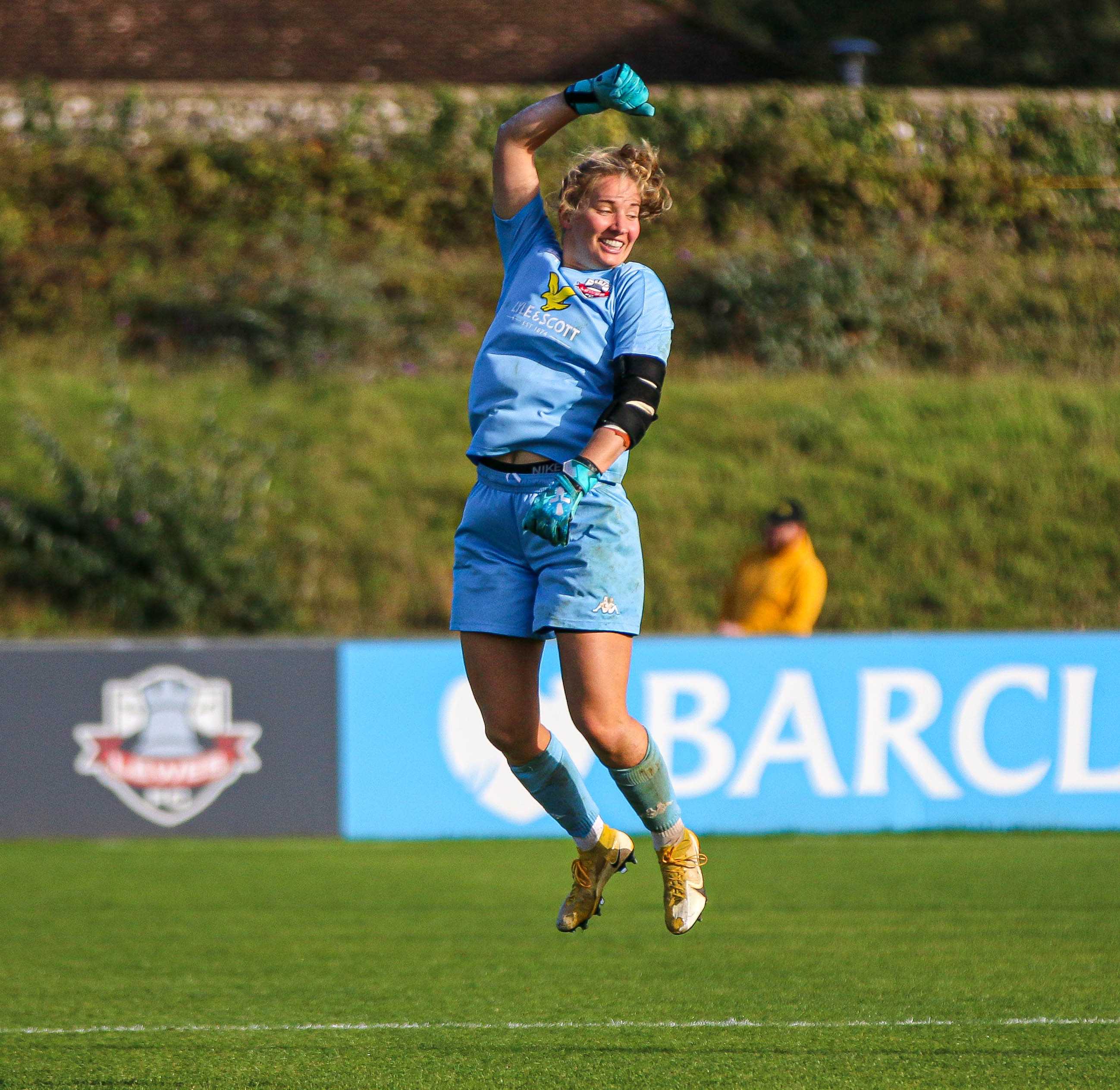
Whitehouse at Lewes in 2023.

In July 2022, she moved on a free transfer to Lewes F.C, in the same year that their American-raised goalkeeper Tatiana Saunders moved on to play for Durham. Lewes is a unique team because they offer equal pay to both their female and male teams and their top paid player is a woman. The team did well in the FA Cup in the 2022–23 season, making the quarter-finals where they were knocked out after a 3–1 loss to Manchester United W.F.C..

=== Charlton Athletic ===
On 20 July 2024, Whitehouse was announced to have signed for Charlton Athletic on a one-year contract. She kept six clean sheets on her way to becoming first-choice goalkeeper in her first season for the Addicks. She was also awarded the Women's Championship Save of the Season award for a 95th minute save in a 1–1 draw against Newcastle United. She signed a contract extension keeping her at The Valley until at least July 2026. She won the WSL2 Save of the Month award for November 2025 for a save against Birmingham City, her second consecutive month winning the award. On 24 March 2026, the club announced she had signed a long-term contract extension until June 2027. She featured in the promotion/relegation playoff on 23 May 2026, where she made four saves during the penalty shootout to help Charlton to win promotion to the Women's Super League.

== International career ==
In April 2023, she travelled back to America as part of the national Irish team who were scheduled to play two friendly football matches in the US. She qualified because her mother was born in Ireland. Whitehouse was one of the four goalkeepers on the Irish squad. On 29 November 2025, Whitehouse made her full international debut in a behind-closed-doors friendly 3–2 win over Hungary in Marbella, Spain.

== Other work ==
Whitehouse was part of the motion capture team, providing the goalkeeper actions, for Football Manager 26, the first game of its series to include women's football.

== Honours ==
Charlton Athletic

- Women's Super League 2 play-off: 2025–26

Individual

- Women's Championship Save of the Season: 2024–25
- Charlton Athletic Player of the Year: 2025–26
- Charlton Athletic Player's Player of the Year: 2025–26
- Women's Super League 2 Golden Glove: 2025–26
- Women's Super League 2 Team of the Season: 2025–26
