= 2012 Chelsea L.F.C. season =

Chelsea
2012 season
- Manager: Matt Beard (until July); Peter Steward (5 July); Emma Hayes (since 14 August)
- Stadium: Wheatsheaf Park
- WSL: 6th
- Women's Cup: Runners-up
- League Cup: Group Stage
- Top goalscorer: League: Helen Lander (7); All: Helen Lander (10), Dunia Susi (10)
| Home colours | Away colours |

Chelsea L.F.C.'s 2012 season was the club's second season in the FA WSL and seventh in the top flight of English women's football, in its 20th year.

== Review and events ==
=== Management changes ===
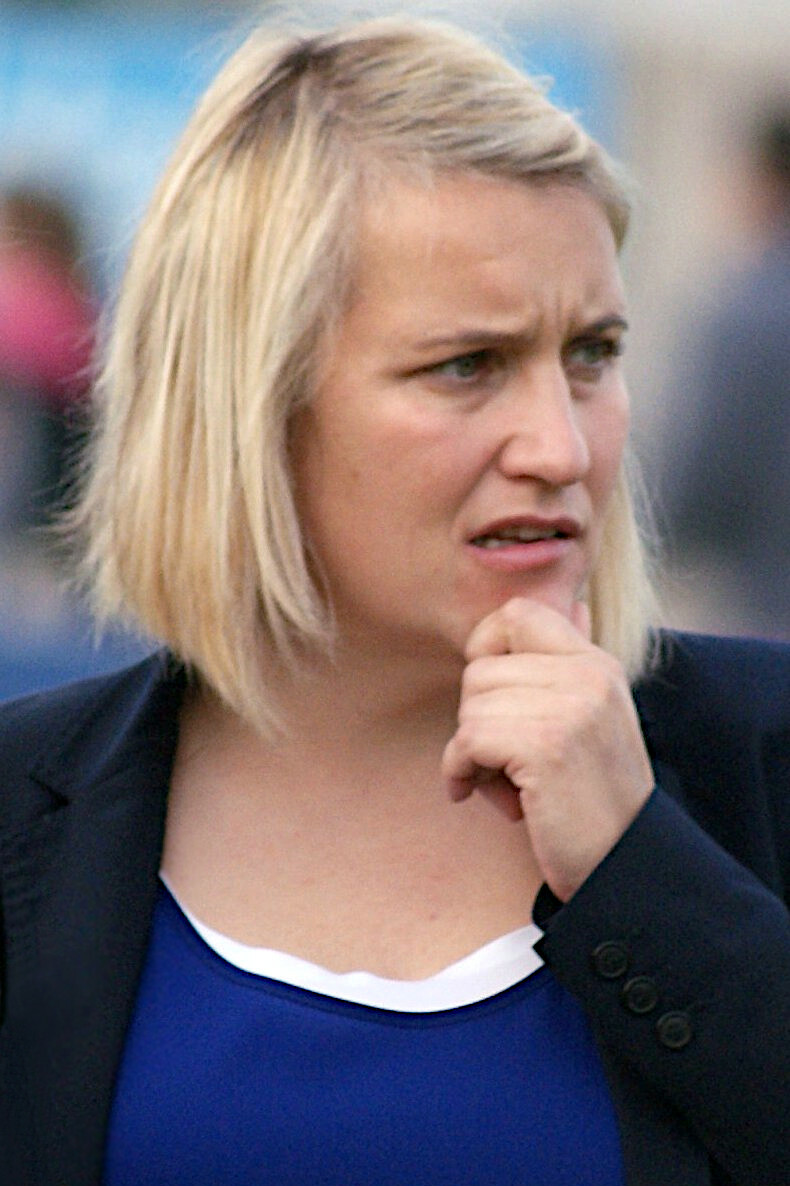
Emma Hayes in 2015.

Chelsea manager Matt Beard resigned in July 2012 to become manager of Liverpool F.C. Women. Beard had been with Chelsea since the 2009–10 season.

Chelsea Ladies chair Peter Steward, who had been the club's assistant manager before Beard, filled in as caretaker manager on 5 July to oversee a 2–4 loss to Arsenal Ladies.

During the mid-season 2012 Summer Olympics break on 14 August, Chelsea announced the hiring of Emma Hayes, a former Arsenal Ladies assistant who had managed clubs and collegiate teams in the United States until 2010 but had since returned to England to work for her family's currency exchange company. Hayes managed her first match with Chelsea on 18 August 2012 in a 1–0 win at Doncaster Rovers Belles.

=== Signings ===
On 10 August 2012, Chelsea signed Spanish striker Adriana Martín to a short-term contract.

== Match results ==
=== FA Women's Super League ===
| 9 April 2012 1 | Chelsea | 3–1 | Doncaster Rovers Belles | Staines |
| | Lander 29'; Susi 58', 90+2' | Report | 24' Lagonia | Stadium: Wheatsheaf Park |

| 22 April 2012 2 | Chelsea | 2–2 | Liverpool | Staines |
| | Lander 34'; Buet 51' | Report | 21' Keryakoplis | Stadium: Wheatsheaf Park; Attendance: 481 |

| 26 April 2012 3 | Arsenal | 3–1 | Chelsea | London |
| | Little 47', 90'; Chapman 68' | Report | 77' Longhurst | Stadium: Emirates Stadium; Attendance: 5,052 |

| 6 May 2012 4 | Chelsea | 0–0 | Bristol Academy | Staines |
| | | Report | | Stadium: Wheatsheaf Park; Attendance: 271 |

| 20 May 2012 5 | Chelsea | 3–1 | Everton | Staines |
| | Lander 24', 45+1', 90+3' | Report | 24' Hinnigan | Stadium: Wheatsheaf Park; Attendance: 214 |

| 31 May 2012 6 | Birmingham City | 4–2 | Chelsea | Stratford upon Avon |
| | Taylor 6'; Carney 11'; Unitt 53'; Potter 82' | Report | 24' Bonner; 52' Lander | Stadium: The DCS Stadium; Attendance: 756; Referee: Ms. S Massey |

| 24 June 2012 7 | Lincoln Ladies | 2–0 | Chelsea | Lincoln |
| | Cantrell 65', 86' | Report | | Stadium: Ashby Avenue |

| 1 July 2012 8 | Liverpool | 0–2 | Chelsea | Lancashire |
| | | Report | 63' Susi; 75' Bonner | Stadium: West Lancashire College; Attendance: 307 |

| 5 July 2012 9 | Chelsea | 2–4 | Arsenal | Staines |
| | Buet 14', 45' | Report | 9' (pen.), 84' Little; 73', 81' Smith | Stadium: Wheatsheaf Park; Attendance: 366 |
Note: Chelsea Ladies chair Peter Steward as caretaker manager following Matt Beard's resignation

| 18 August 2012 10 | Doncaster Rovers Belles | 0–1 | Chelsea | Doncaster, South Yorkshire |
| | | Report; Box | Coombs 75' | Stadium: Keepmoat Stadium |
Note: First match with Emma Hayes as manager

| 30 August 2012 11 | Chelsea | 0–1 | Birmingham City | Staines |
| | Bowman (yellow card) 57'; Bonner (yellow card) 89' | Report; Box | Williams (yellow card) 44' (goal) 78'; Westwood (yellow card) 90' | Stadium: Wheatsheaf Park |

| 9 September 2012 12 | Everton | 2–1 | Chelsea | Crosby, Merseyside |
| 14:00 | Duggan 46'; Harries 84' | Report; Box | Martin 90+4' | Stadium: Rossett Park; Referee: Craig Buxton |

| 22 September 2012 13 | Bristol Academy | 0–1 | Chelsea | Bristol |
| | Rose (yellow card); Fishlock (yellow card) | Report; Box | Bonner (yellow card) 84'; Buet 5' (pen.) (yellow card) 55' (yellow-red card) | Stadium: Stoke Gifford Stadium; Referee: Lisa Rashid |

| 7 October 2012 14 | Chelsea | 2–3 | Lincoln Ladies | Staines |
| | Lander 60'; Longhurst (yellow card) 87'; Lappin (yellow card) 90'; Susi 90+2' | Report; Report; Box | Hamilton 44' (Allen); Allen 49' (Stoney); Staniforth 54'; Walton (red card) 64' | Stadium: Wheatsheaf Park |

=== League table ===
| Pos | Team | Pld | W | D | L | GF | GA | GD | Pts |
|---|---|---|---|---|---|---|---|---|---|
| 4 | Bristol Academy | 14 | 4 | 6 | 4 | 17 | 16 | +1 | 18 |
| 5 | Lincoln | 14 | 5 | 3 | 6 | 24 | 26 | −2 | 18 |
| 6 | Chelsea | 14 | 5 | 2 | 7 | 20 | 23 | −3 | 17 |
| 7 | Doncaster Rovers Belles | 14 | 3 | 2 | 9 | 14 | 28 | −14 | 11 |
| 8 | Liverpool | 14 | 1 | 2 | 11 | 15 | 35 | −20 | 5 |

Source: FA WSL results
Rules for classification: 1) Points; 2) Goal difference; 3) Number of goals scored

=== Results summary ===
| Overall | | | | | | | | Home | | | | | | Away | | | | | |
| Pld | W | D | L | GF | GA | GD | Pts | W | D | L | GF | GA | GD | W | D | L | GF | GA | GD |
|---|---|---|---|---|---|---|---|---|---|---|---|---|---|---|---|---|---|---|---|
| 14 | 5 | 2 | 7 | 20 | 23 | −3 | 17 | 2 | 2 | 3 | 12 | 12 | 0 | 3 | 0 | 4 | 8 | 11 | −3 |

Last updated: October 7, 2012.
Source: FA WSL results

== FA Women's Cup ==
Chelsea entered the competition in the fifth round as a FA WSL team. They beat The Seagulls and The Belles before they demolished Arsenal in the semi-finals. Chelsea were through to the FA Women's Cup Final for the first time in the cup history, alongside Birmingham City. They were unable to hold their lead in the full-time and even in the extra time and were defeated in the penalty shoot-out.

| 11 March 2012 Fifth round | Chelsea | 3–0 | Brighton & Hove Albion | Staines |
| 14:00 GST | Susi; Bleazard; Lappin | Report | | Stadium: Wheatsheaf Park; Attendance: 282 |

| 25 March 2012 Sixth round | Doncaster Rovers Belles | 0–2 | Chelsea | Doncaster |
| 14:00 GST | | Report | 72' Bonner; 81' Susi | Stadium: Keepmoat Stadium; Attendance: 538 |

| 3 May 2012 Semi-finals | Chelsea | 2–0 | Arsenal | Brentford |
| 14:00 GST | Bleazard 22'; Susi 85' | Report | | Stadium: Stoke Griffin Park; Attendance: 358; Referee: Paul Forrester |

| 26 May 2012 Final | Birmingham City | 2–2 (a.e.t.) (3–2 p) | Chelsea | Bristol |
| 12:15 BST | Williams 90+1'; Carney 112' | Report | 70' Lander; 101' Longhurst | Stadium: Ashton Gate; Attendance: 8,723; Referee: Natalie Walker (Lancashire) |
| | Penalties |
| | Williams (penalty missed); Unitt (penalty scored); Taylor (penalty scored); Carney (penalty scored) | | (penalty scored) Sherwood; (penalty missed) Spence; (penalty missed) Rafferty; (penalty scored) Buet; (penalty missed) Bonner |

=== FA Women's League Cup ===
In the competition's new format, Chelsea were drawn into group B alongside Arsenal, Liverpool and Lincoln Ladies. Chelsea could manage only three points in the group stage and were eliminated in the last group match.

| 18 March 2012 Group Stage | Chelsea | 1–2 | Lincoln Ladies | Staines |
| | Bleazard 57' | Report | 51' Hamilton; 67' Staniforth | Stadium: Wheatsheaf Park; Attendance: 132 |

| 13 May 2012 Group Stage | Chelsea | 2–1 | Liverpool | Staines |
| | Lander 1'; Susi 49' | Report | 61' Gielnik | Stadium: Wheatsheaf Park; Attendance: 157 |

| 10 June 2012 Group Stage | Arsenal | 3–0 | Chelsea | Borehamwood |
| 14:00 GST | Nobbs 14'; Little 58' (pen.); Beattie 80' | Report; Report | | Stadium: Meadow Park; Attendance: 634; Referee: A. Degnarain |

=== Group B table ===
| Pos | Team | Pld | W | D | L | GF | GA | GD | Pts | Qualification |
|---|---|---|---|---|---|---|---|---|---|---|
| 1 | Lincoln Ladies | 3 | 3 | 0 | 0 | 9 | 6 | +3 | 9 | Qualification |
| 2 | Arsenal | 3 | 2 | 0 | 1 | 9 | 4 | +5 | 6 | Qualification |
| 3 | Chelsea | 3 | 1 | 0 | 2 | 3 | 6 | −3 | 3 | |
| 4 | Liverpool | 3 | 0 | 0 | 3 | 3 | 8 | −5 | 0 | |

Source: FA WSL results
Rules for classification: 1) Points; 2) Goal difference; 3) Number of goals scored

== Squad statistics ==
As of match played 7 October 2012

| No. | Pos | Nat | Player | Total | | WSL | | FA Cup | | League Cup | |
| No. | Pos | Nat | Player | Apps | Goals | Apps | Goals | Apps | Goals | Apps | Goals |
|---|---|---|---|---|---|---|---|---|---|---|---|
| 1 | GK | (England) ENG | Carly Telford | 18 | 0 | 11 | 0 | 3 | 0 | 4 | 0 |
| 2 | MF | (England) ENG | Lara Fay | 14 | 0 | 7 | 0 | 2 | 0 | 5 | 0 |
| 3 | DF | (Republic of Ireland) IRL | Sophie Perry | 11 | 0 | 5 | 0 | 4 | 0 | 2 | 0 |
| 4 | MF | (England) ENG | Drew Spence | 12 | 0 | 6 | 0 | 2 | 0 | 4 | 0 |
| 5 | DF | (England) ENG | Gemma Bonner | 24 | 4 | 14 | 2 | 4 | 1 | 6 | 1 |
| 6 | MF | (Wales) WAL | Katie Sherwood | 15 | 0 | 6 | 0 | 4 | 0 | 5 | 0 |
| 7 | FW | (England) ENG | Ashlee Hincks | 14 | 0 | 6 | 0 | 3 | 0 | 5 | 0 |
| 8 | MF | (England) ENG | Danielle Buet | 23 | 5 | 13 | 5 | 4 | 0 | 6 | 0 |
| 9 | MF | (Scotland) SCO | Suzanne Lappin | 16 | 1 | 11 | 0 | 1 | 1 | 4 | 0 |
| 10 | FW | (Wales) WAL | Helen Lander | 23 | 10 | 13 | 7 | 4 | 1 | 6 | 2 |
| 11 | MF | (England) ENG | Claire Rafferty | 14 | 0 | 11 | 0 | 1 | 0 | 2 | 0 |
| 12 | MF | (New Zealand) NZL | Hayley Moorwood | 0 | 0 | 0 | 0 | 0 | 0 | 0 | 0 |
| 14 | DF | (Wales) WAL | Kylie Davies | 8 | 0 | 6 | 0 | 1 | 0 | 1 | 0 |
| 15 | MF | (Wales) WAL | Helen Bleazard | 23 | 4 | 13 | 0 | 4 | 2 | 6 | 2 |
| 16 | DF | (Wales) WAL | Sophie Ingle | 23 | 0 | 13 | 0 | 4 | 0 | 6 | 0 |
| 17 | FW | (England) ENG | Dunia Susi | 24 | 10 | 14 | 4 | 4 | 3 | 6 | 3 |
| 18 | GK | (England) ENG | Sarah Quantrill | 8 | 0 | 4 | 0 | 1 | 0 | 3 | 0 |
| 19 | MF | (England) ENG | Laura Coombs | 23 | 1 | 13 | 1 | 4 | 0 | 6 | 0 |
| 20 | FW | (England) ENG | Kate Longhurst | 19 | 3 | 10 | 1 | 4 | 1 | 5 | 1 |
| 21 | DF | (England) ENG | Victoria Williams | 10 | 0 | 5 | 0 | 2 | 0 | 3 | 0 |
| 21 | MF | (Spain) ESP | Adriana Martín | 5 | 1 | 5 | 1 | 0 | 0 | 0 | 0 |
| 27 | DF | (England) ENG | Sophie Gwilliam | 3 | 0 | 1 | 0 | 0 | 0 | 2 | 0 |
