= 2011–12 in English football =

Football in England
- Season: 2011–12

Men's football
- Premier League: Manchester City
- Championship: Reading
- League One: Charlton Athletic
- League Two: Swindon Town
- Conference Premier: Fleetwood Town
- FA Cup: Chelsea
- League Cup: Liverpool
- Community Shield: Manchester United

Women's football
- WSL: Arsenal
- FA Women's Premier League National Division: Sunderland
- FA Women's Premier League Northern Division: Manchester City
- FA Women's Premier League Southern Division: Portsmouth
- FA Women's Cup: Birmingham City
- WSL Cup: Arsenal

The 2011–12 season was the 132nd season of competitive football in England.

The season began on 5 August 2011 for the Football League, on 12 August for the Football Conference and 13 August for the Premier League. The Championship ended on 28 April 2012, whilst League One, and League Two ended on 5 May 2012. The Premier League ended on 13 May 2012.

== Promotion and relegation (pre-season) ==
Teams relegated from the Premier League ▼

- Birmingham City ▼
- Blackpool ▼
- West Ham United ▼

Teams promoted to the Premier League ▲

- Queens Park Rangers ▲
- Norwich City ▲
- Swansea City ▲

Teams relegated from the Championship ▼

- Preston North End ▼
- Sheffield United ▼
- Scunthorpe United ▼

Teams promoted to Championship ▲

- Brighton & Hove Albion ▲
- Southampton ▲
- Peterborough United ▲

Teams relegated from League One ▼

- Dagenham & Redbridge ▼
- Bristol Rovers ▼
- Plymouth Argyle ▼
- Swindon Town ▼

Teams promoted to League One ▲

- Chesterfield ▲
- Bury ▲
- Wycombe Wanderers ▲
- Stevenage ▲

Teams relegated from League Two ▼

- Lincoln City ▼
- Stockport County ▼

Teams promoted to League Two ▲

- Crawley Town ▲
- AFC Wimbledon ▲

== Honours ==
=== Trophy and League champions ===
| Competition | Winner | Details | At | Match Report |
|---|---|---|---|---|
| FA Cup | Chelsea | 2011–12 FA Cup beat Liverpool 2–1 | Wembley | Report |
| League Cup | Liverpool | 2011–12 Football League Cup beat Cardiff City 3–2 on penalties (2–2 after extra time) | Wembley | Report |
| Premier League | Manchester City | 2011–12 Premier League beat QPR 3–2 | City of Manchester Stadium | Report |
| Football League Championship | Reading | 2011–12 Football League Championship | Madejski Stadium | Report |
| Football League One | Charlton Athletic | 2011–12 Football League One | The Valley | Report |
| Football League Two | Swindon Town | 2011–12 Football League Two | County Ground | Report |
| FA Community Shield | Manchester United | 2011 FA Community Shield beat Manchester City 3–2 | Wembley | Report |
| Football League Trophy | Chesterfield | 2011–12 Football League Trophy beat Swindon Town 2–0 | Wembley | Report |
| FA Trophy | York City | 2011–12 FA Trophy beat Newport County 2–0 | Wembley | Report |

=== Promotion winners ===
| Competition | Winner | Details |
|---|---|---|
| Football League Championship | Southampton | 2nd in Championship |
| Football League One | Sheffield Wednesday | 2nd in League One |
| Football League Two | Shrewsbury Town and Crawley Town | 2nd and 3rd in League Two |

=== Playoff winners ===
| Competition | Winner | Details |
|---|---|---|
| Football League Championship | West Ham United | 2011–12 Football League Championship; Beat Blackpool 2–1 |
| Football League One | Huddersfield Town | 2011–12 Football League One; Beat Sheffield United 8–7 on Penalties (0–0 after extra time) |
| Football League Two | Crewe Alexandra | 2011–12 Football League Two; Beat Cheltenham Town 2–0 |
| Conference National | York City | 2011–12 Conference National; Beat Luton Town 2–1 |
| Conference North | Nuneaton Town | 2011–12 Conference North; Beat Gainsborough Trinity 1–0 |
| Conference South | Dartford | 2011–12 Conference South; Beat Welling United 1–0 |

== New clubs ==
- Windsor F.C., a new club formed and owned by fans of the defunct Windsor & Eton F.C., were accepted into the Combined Counties Football League Premier Division (level 9). Their first match in the competition was a 1–1 draw with South Park.
- Guernsey F.C. were accepted into the Combined Counties Football League Division One (level 10). Their first match in the competition was a 5–0 victory over Knaphill.

=== Clubs removed ===
- Andover, resigned from Southern League Division One South and West (level 8), 25 July 2011.
- Croydon Athletic, resigned from Isthmian League Division One South (level 8), 18 January 2012.

== Retirements ==
- 1 September 2011: Steve Lovell, 30, former AFC Bournemouth and Portsmouth striker.
- 24 October 2011: Luke Nightingale, 30, former Portsmouth and Southend United striker.
- 13 December 2011: Simon Whaley, 26, former Bury, Preston North End, Norwich City, Chesterfield, Doncaster Rovers and Burton Albion midfielder.
- 15 December 2011: Paul Boertien, 32, former Carlisle United, Derby County, Walsall and Burton Albion defender.
- 1 March 2012: Bruno Berner, 34, former Switzerland, Blackburn Rovers and Leicester City defender.
- 17 March 2012: Scott Severin, 33, former Scotland and Watford midfielder.
- 3 April 2012: Luke Potter, 22, former Barnsley defender.
- 28 April 2012: Graham Alexander, 40, former Scotland, Scunthorpe United, Luton Town, Preston North End and Burnley defender.
- 2 May 2012: Sol Campbell, 37, former England, Tottenham Hotspur, Arsenal, Portsmouth, Notts County and Newcastle United defender.
- 5 May 2012: Romain Larrieu, 35, former Plymouth Argyle goalkeeper.
- 9 May 2012: Neil Mellor, 29, former Liverpool and Preston North End forward.
- 14 May 2012: Ruud van Nistelrooy, 35, former Netherlands and Manchester United striker who scored 95 FA Premier League goals.
- 19 May 2012: Radhi Jaïdi, 36, former Tunisia, Bolton Wanderers, Birmingham City and Southampton defender.
- 28 May 2012: Carl Fletcher, 32, former Wales, AFC Bournemouth, West Ham United, Crystal Palace and Plymouth Argyle midfielder.
- 12 June 2012: Sylvain Wiltord, 38, former France and Arsenal forward.
- Summer 2012: Mark Kennedy, 35, former Republic of Ireland, Millwall, Liverpool, Manchester City, Wolverhampton Wanderers, Crystal Palace, Cardiff City and Ipswich Town midfielder/defender.
- Summer 2012: Kevin Poole, 48, oldest registered player in the Football League having played as a goalkeeper for 32 years with the likes of Aston Villa, Middlesbrough, Leicester City, Birmingham City, Bolton Wanderers, Derby County and Burton Albion.
- Summer 2012: André Ooijer, 37, former Netherlands and Blackburn Rovers defender.
- Summer 2012: Rhys Day, 29, former Mansfield Town and Oxford United defender.

== Deaths ==
- 27 June 2011: Mike Doyle, 64, former Manchester City, Stoke City, Bolton Wanderers and England defender.
- 5 August 2011: Stan Willemse, 86, former Brighton and Hove Albion, Chelsea, and Leyton Orient defender.
- 16 August 2011: Frank Munro, 63, former Wolves, Aberdeen and Dundee United defender.
- 28 August 2011: Bernie Gallacher, 44, former Aston Villa, Doncaster Rovers and Brighton & Hove Albion defender.
- 29 August 2011: Mark Ovendale, 37, former AFC Bournemouth, and Luton Town goalkeeper
- 1 September 2011: George Knight, 90, former Burnley forward.
- 9 September 2011: Laurie Hughes, 87, former Liverpool defender.
- 11 September 2011: Ralph Gubbins, 79, former Bolton Wanderers, Hull City and Tranmere Rovers forward.
- 8 November 2011: Jimmy Adamson, 82, former Burnley player and manager who also had short spells in charge of Sunderland and Leeds United.
- 14 November 2011: Alf Fields, 92, former Arsenal defender.
- 24 November 2011: Johnny Williams, 76, former Plymouth Argyle and Bristol Rovers wing half.
- 27 November 2011: Gary Speed, 42, Wales manager who played in midfield for Leeds United, Everton, Newcastle United, Bolton Wanderers and Sheffield United.
- 7 December 2011: Peter Croker, 89, former Charlton Athletic and Watford full back.
- 9 December 2011: Len Phillips, 89, former Portsmouth and England forward
- 25 December 2011: George Robb, 85, former Tottenham Hotspur outside left and British Olympian.
- 1 January 2012: Gary Ablett, 46, former Liverpool, Everton and Birmingham City defender.
- 8 January 2012: Graham Rathbone, 69, former Grimsby Town and Cambridge United centre half.
- 10 January 2012: Cliff Portwood, 74, former Preston North End, Port Vale, Grimsby Town and Portsmouth forward.
- 16 January 2012: Sigursteinn Gíslason, 43, former Stoke City and Iceland midfielder.
- 21 January 2012: Ernie Gregory, 90, former West Ham United goalkeeper.
- 12 February 2012: Malcolm Devitt, 75, former Bradford City inside forward.
- 13 February 2012: Eamonn Deacy, 53, former Aston Villa, Derby County and Republic of Ireland full back.
- 14 February 2012: Tom McAnearney, 79, former Sheffield Wednesday, Peterborough United and Aldershot wing half, who also had spells in management with Aldershot and Crewe Alexandra.
- February 2012: Peter King, 47, former Crewe Alexandra midfielder.
- 2 March 2012: Gerry Bridgwood, 67, former Shrewsbury Town and Stoke City midfielder.
- 9 March 2012: Brian Bromley, 65, former Bolton Wanderers, Portsmouth, Brighton & Hove Albion, Reading and Darlington inside left.
- 14 March 2012: Ray Barlow, 85, former West Bromwich Albion and Birmingham City left half.
- 30 March 2012: Barry Kitchener, 64, former central defender who holds the record number of appearances for his only club Millwall.
- 5 April 2012: Jimmy Lawlor, 78, former Doncaster Rovers and Bradford City centre half.
- 6 April 2012: Larry Canning, 86, former Aston Villa wing half.
- 14 April 2012: Eddie May, 68, former Southend United, Wrexham and Swansea City defender, who also managed Newport County, Cardiff City, Torquay United and Brentford.
- 18 April 2012: Arthur Bottom, 82, former York City, Sheffield United, Newcastle United and Chesterfield striker.
- 20 April 2012: Alfie Biggs, 76, former Bristol Rovers, Preston North End, Walsall and Swansea Town forward.
- 8 May 2012: Barry Lowes, 73, former Bury, Coventry City, Blackpool and Swindon Town midfielder.
- 5 June 2012: Steve Buttle, 59, former AFC Bournemouth midfielder, who also had a lengthy spell in the USA.
- 6 June 2012: Chris Thompson, 52, former Bolton Wanderers, Blackburn Rovers, Wigan Athletic, Blackpool, Cardiff City and Walsall midfielder/forward.
- 10 June 2012: Gordon West, 69, former England, Blackpool, Everton and Tranmere Rovers goalkeeper.
- 23 June 2012: Alan McDonald, 48, former Northern Ireland, Queens Park Rangers and Swindon Town defender.
- 24 June 2012: Miki Roqué, 23, Real Betis defender who previously played in England for Liverpool and Oldham Athletic.

== England national football team ==
=== Euro 2012 qualification ===
| 2 September 2011 | Bulgaria | 0–3 | England | Vasil Levski National Stadium, Sofia |
| 21:15 UTC+3 | | Report | Cahill 13'; Rooney 21', 90+4' | Attendance: 36,521; Referee: Frank De Bleeckere (Belgium) |

| 6 September 2011 | England | 1–0 | Wales | Wembley Stadium, London |
| 19:45 UTC+1 | Young 35' | Report | | Attendance: 77,128; Referee: Robert Schörgenhofer (Austria) |

| 7 October 2011 | Montenegro | 2–2 | England | Podgorica City Stadium, Podgorica |
| 21:00 UTC+2 | Zverotić 45'; Delibašić 90+1' | Report | Young 11'; Bent 31' | Attendance: 15,000; Referee: Wolfgang Stark (Germany) |

=== Friendlies ===
| 10 August 2011 | England | P – P | Netherlands | Wembley Stadium, London |
| 20:00 BST |
Note: Due to riots in London, the friendly against the Netherlands scheduled for 10 August was called off.

| 12 November 2011 | England | 1–0 | Spain | Wembley Stadium, London |
| 17:15 GMT | Lampard 49' | Report | | Attendance: 87,189; Referee: Frank De Bleeckere (Belgium) |

| 15 November 2011 | England | 1–0 | Sweden | Wembley Stadium, London |
| 20:00 GMT | Barry 22' | Report | | Attendance: 48,876; Referee: Pavel Královec (Czech Republic) |

| 29 February 2012 | England | 2–3 | Netherlands | Wembley Stadium, London |
| 20:00 GMT | Cahill 85'; Young 90+2' | Report | Robben 57', 90+2'; Huntelaar 59' | Attendance: 76,283; Referee: Felix Brych (Germany) |
Note: The match against the Netherlands, originally scheduled for 10 August 2011, was rescheduled to 29 February 2012 due to the riots in London.

| 26 May 2012 | Norway | 0–1 | England | Ullevaal Stadion, Oslo |
| 20:45 CEST | | Report | Young 9' | Attendance: 21,496; Referee: Michael Weiner (Germany) |

| 1 June 2012 | England | 1–0 | Belgium | Wembley Stadium, London |
| 17:15 BST | Welbeck 36' | Report | | Attendance: 85,091; Referee: Peter Rasmussen (Denmark) |

== League tables ==
=== Premier League ===
In one of the most memorable finishes to a season in recent memory, Manchester City ended a 44-year wait to win their first Premier League title on goal difference, with Sergio Agüero scoring in the last minute of stoppage time during their dramatic 3–2 win over Queens Park Rangers on the final day. Despite being pushed all the way, they won their final six games, while cross-city neighbours Manchester United squandered an eight-point lead in what was largely a trophyless season for Sir Alex Ferguson's men for the first time in six years. Arsenal recovered from a poor start to the season to take third place, while striker Robin van Persie won the Players' Player of the Year Award by scoring 30 goals.

Newcastle finished fifth to qualify for the Europa League, recording their first top-six finish in eight years under Alan Pardew, who won the Manager of the Year award. Chelsea suffered their worst season in ten years, finishing sixth with 64 points; André Villas-Boas, the personal choice for owner Roman Abramovich, was sacked after just nine months with automatic qualification for the Champions League at risk. Under caretaker manager Roberto Di Matteo, however, they excelled in the cup competitions, winning the FA Cup for the fourth time in six seasons. It was the Champions League, though, in which they stunned everyone, storming their way through each round to reach the final against Bayern Munich. Pushing the German powerhouse to penalties, they kept the advantage and ultimately won 4–3, giving them their first European Cup victory and ensuring they qualified for the elite competition once again; their victory meant that fourth-placed Tottenham had to enter the Europa League and caused Harry Redknapp to lose his job after 3 1/2 years in charge.

Liverpool were similar to Chelsea for parts of the league, but ultimately worse as they recorded their lowest league finish for 18 years, finishing in eighth place and only edging ninth-placed Fulham on a higher goal difference; their season was marred by striker Luis Suárez being convicted of racially abusing Manchester United defender Patrice Evra in October. They put this controversy behind them by winning the League Cup, ending five consecutive seasons without winning a trophy. Kenny Dalglish, fabled for his earlier Liverpool managerial reign in the late 1980s, was sacked after just 16 months following a poor finish to the season that saw them pick up just 13 points from 14 games.

For only the second time in Premier League history, all three promoted teams survived, though all finished in the bottom half. Swansea City were the pundit's choice to be relegated, but they defied their critics with their own unique style of football and claimed shock victories over the likes of Manchester City, Arsenal and Liverpool to finish a respectable 11th; by the season's end, Brendan Rodgers was starting to attract the attention of other Premier League teams. Norwich City finished just below them in 12th, tied with Swansea and West Bromwich Albion, impressing on their return to the top flight and also had manager Paul Lambert attracting the attention of other Premier League clubs. Queens Park Rangers were left needing to rely on other results on the last day to help them survive, though an unbeaten run of 16 points from their last six home fixtures played a major part in their survival.

The sacking of Mick McCarthy after nearly six years and the appointment of first team coach Terry Connor effectively ended Wolverhampton Wanderers' three-year spell in the top-flight. With just four points and no wins taken from Connor's final 13 games in charge, they finished bottom of the table. Having been clear of the relegation zone in mid-March, Blackburn Rovers were also undone by poor late-season form; losing eight of their last nine games as growing anger from the supporters toward owners Venky's and manager Steve Kean continued. Bolton Wanderers, who coincidentally had been promoted alongside Blackburn in 2001, went down on the last day of the season after a horrible start to the year that saw them bottom for most of the campaign.

| Pos | Team | Pld | W | D | L | GF | GA | GD | Pts | Qualification or relegation |
|---|---|---|---|---|---|---|---|---|---|---|
| 1 | Manchester City (C) | 38 | 28 | 5 | 5 | 93 | 29 | +64 | 89 | Qualification for the Champions League group stage |
| 2 | Manchester United | 38 | 28 | 5 | 5 | 89 | 33 | +56 | 89 | Qualification for the Champions League group stage |
| 3 | Arsenal | 38 | 21 | 7 | 10 | 74 | 49 | +25 | 70 | Qualification for the Champions League group stage |
| 4 | Tottenham Hotspur | 38 | 20 | 9 | 9 | 66 | 41 | +25 | 69 | Qualification for the Europa League group stage (Note: Chelsea won the Champions League and thus qualified for the group stage as defending champions, forfeiting their spot in the Europa League as the FA Cup winners. This meant that Tottenham were to compete in the Europa League group stage, since, pursuant to the rules, only four clubs from the Premier League could play in the Champions League.) |
| 5 | Newcastle United | 38 | 19 | 8 | 11 | 56 | 51 | +5 | 65 | Qualification for the Europa League play-off round |
| 6 | Chelsea | 38 | 18 | 10 | 10 | 65 | 46 | +19 | 64 | Qualification for the Champions League group stage |
| 7 | Everton | 38 | 15 | 11 | 12 | 50 | 40 | +10 | 56 | |
| 8 | Liverpool | 38 | 14 | 10 | 14 | 47 | 40 | +7 | 52 | Qualification for the Europa League third qualifying round (Note: Liverpool won the League Cup and thus qualified for the Europa League third qualifying round.) |
| 9 | Fulham | 38 | 14 | 10 | 14 | 48 | 51 | −3 | 52 | |
| 10 | West Bromwich Albion | 38 | 13 | 8 | 17 | 45 | 52 | −7 | 47 | |
| 11 | Swansea City | 38 | 12 | 11 | 15 | 44 | 51 | −7 | 47 | |
| 12 | Norwich City | 38 | 12 | 11 | 15 | 52 | 66 | −14 | 47 | |
| 13 | Sunderland | 38 | 11 | 12 | 15 | 45 | 46 | −1 | 45 | |
| 14 | Stoke City | 38 | 11 | 12 | 15 | 36 | 53 | −17 | 45 | |
| 15 | Wigan Athletic | 38 | 11 | 10 | 17 | 42 | 62 | −20 | 43 | |
| 16 | Aston Villa | 38 | 7 | 17 | 14 | 37 | 53 | −16 | 38 | |
| 17 | Queens Park Rangers | 38 | 10 | 7 | 21 | 43 | 66 | −23 | 37 | |
| 18 | Bolton Wanderers (R) | 38 | 10 | 6 | 22 | 46 | 77 | −31 | 36 | Relegation to Football League Championship |
| 19 | Blackburn Rovers (R) | 38 | 8 | 7 | 23 | 48 | 78 | −30 | 31 | Relegation to Football League Championship |
| 20 | Wolverhampton Wanderers (R) | 38 | 5 | 10 | 23 | 40 | 82 | −42 | 25 | Relegation to Football League Championship |

Source: Barclays Premier League
Rules for classification: 1) points; 2) goal difference; 3) number of goals scored.
(C) Champions; (R) Relegated
Notes:

Leading goalscorer: Robin van Persie (Arsenal) – 30

=== Football League Championship ===
A year after suffering heartbreak in the play-off final, an excellent run of 50 points from their remaining 21 games saw Reading crowned divisional champions, earning promotion to the top flight for only the second time in their history. Having been in the top two for the majority of the season, Southampton finished in the runners-up spot to claim their second successive promotion, returning to the Premier League after a seven-year absence as their revival under Nigel Adkins continued, one year after Norwich won a second successive promotion. West Ham United, who lost out to Southampton on the last day of the season, won promotion via the play-offs, with manager Sam Allardyce passing his former clubs Blackburn and Bolton on the way up.

Doncaster Rovers' luck finally ran out after four years of operating on the division's lowest budget, and they were relegated in bottom place. 11 years after dropping out of the Premier League, Coventry City finally hit rock bottom as they suffered from an ongoing financial crisis and the loss of several key players pre-season, their never-ending downward spiral culminating in relegation to the third tier for the first time since 1964. Portsmouth fell back into financial difficulties and went into administration for the second time in three seasons, with the resulting ten-point deduction dealing a fatal blow to their survival hopes and sending them down to League One (had it not been for Portsmouth's points deduction, Barnsley would have been the third relegated team).

| Pos | Team | Pld | W | D | L | GF | GA | GD | Pts | Promotion or relegation |
|---|---|---|---|---|---|---|---|---|---|---|
| 1 | Reading (C, P) | 46 | 27 | 8 | 11 | 69 | 41 | +28 | 89 | Promotion to the Premier League |
| 2 | Southampton (P) | 46 | 26 | 10 | 10 | 85 | 46 | +39 | 88 | Promotion to the Premier League |
| 3 | West Ham United (O, P) | 46 | 24 | 14 | 8 | 81 | 48 | +33 | 86 | Qualification for Championship play-offs |
| 4 | Birmingham City | 46 | 20 | 16 | 10 | 78 | 51 | +27 | 76 | Qualification for Championship play-offs |
| 5 | Blackpool | 46 | 20 | 15 | 11 | 79 | 59 | +20 | 75 | Qualification for Championship play-offs |
| 6 | Cardiff City | 46 | 19 | 18 | 9 | 66 | 53 | +13 | 75 | Qualification for Championship play-offs |
| 7 | Middlesbrough | 46 | 18 | 16 | 12 | 52 | 51 | +1 | 70 | |
| 8 | Hull City | 46 | 19 | 11 | 16 | 47 | 44 | +3 | 68 | |
| 9 | Leicester City | 46 | 18 | 12 | 16 | 66 | 55 | +11 | 66 | |
| 10 | Brighton & Hove Albion | 46 | 17 | 15 | 14 | 52 | 52 | 0 | 66 | |
| 11 | Watford | 46 | 16 | 16 | 14 | 56 | 64 | −8 | 64 | |
| 12 | Derby County | 46 | 18 | 10 | 18 | 50 | 58 | −8 | 64 | |
| 13 | Burnley | 46 | 17 | 11 | 18 | 61 | 58 | +3 | 62 | |
| 14 | Leeds United | 46 | 17 | 10 | 19 | 65 | 68 | −3 | 61 | |
| 15 | Ipswich Town | 46 | 17 | 10 | 19 | 69 | 77 | −8 | 61 | |
| 16 | Millwall | 46 | 15 | 12 | 19 | 55 | 57 | −2 | 57 | |
| 17 | Crystal Palace | 46 | 13 | 17 | 16 | 46 | 51 | −5 | 56 | |
| 18 | Peterborough United | 46 | 13 | 11 | 22 | 67 | 77 | −10 | 50 | |
| 19 | Nottingham Forest | 46 | 14 | 8 | 24 | 48 | 63 | −15 | 50 | |
| 20 | Bristol City | 46 | 12 | 13 | 21 | 44 | 68 | −24 | 49 | |
| 21 | Barnsley | 46 | 13 | 9 | 24 | 49 | 74 | −25 | 48 | |
| 22 | Portsmouth (R) | 46 | 13 | 11 | 22 | 50 | 59 | −9 | 40 (Note: Portsmouth were deducted 10 points for entering administration.) | Relegation to League One |
| 23 | Coventry City (R) | 46 | 9 | 13 | 24 | 41 | 65 | −24 | 40 | Relegation to League One |
| 24 | Doncaster Rovers (R) | 46 | 8 | 12 | 26 | 43 | 80 | −37 | 36 | Relegation to League One |

Updated to match(es) played on 28 April 2012. Source: BBC Sport
Rules for classification: 1) points; 2) goal difference; 3) number of goals scored.
(C) Champions; (O) Play-off winners; (P) Promoted; (R) Relegated
Notes:

Leading goalscorer Rickie Lambert (Southampton) – 27

=== League One ===
Chris Powell's first full season in charge of Charlton earned the Addicks promotion at the third time of asking, leading the division for virtually the entire season to win the title with a club record of 101 points. The two Sheffield clubs contested the second automatic promotion spot; United were in the top two for most of the season, but struggled with form after top scorer Ched Evans was imprisoned for rape, allowing Wednesday to claim second place and a return to the Championship after a two-year absence. It was ultimately to be another Yorkshire team, Huddersfield Town, who were victorious over United in the play-offs, meaning they would be playing in the second tier for the first time since 2001.

After equalling their highest league finish last season, the departure of Keith Hill to Barnsley during the summer meant that Rochdale finished bottom, bringing their long-awaited spell in League One to an end after just two years. Exeter City also failed to build on their near-miss of the previous season's play-offs and finished second bottom, returning to League Two after three years. Chesterfield could not adjust to life in the third tier and they too were relegated, despite winning the Football League Trophy. Wycombe Wanderers, who finished six points behind the Spireites last season, did not last long either, and they also suffered immediate relegation back to League Two.

| Pos | Team | Pld | W | D | L | GF | GA | GD | Pts | Promotion, qualification or relegation |
|---|---|---|---|---|---|---|---|---|---|---|
| 1 | Charlton Athletic (C, P) | 46 | 30 | 11 | 5 | 82 | 36 | +46 | 101 | Promotion to Football League Championship |
| 2 | Sheffield Wednesday (P) | 46 | 28 | 9 | 9 | 81 | 48 | +33 | 93 | Promotion to Football League Championship |
| 3 | Sheffield United | 46 | 27 | 9 | 10 | 92 | 51 | +41 | 90 | Qualification for League One play-offs (Note: Four teams play for one spot and promotion to Football League Championship.) |
| 4 | Huddersfield Town (O, P) | 46 | 21 | 18 | 7 | 79 | 47 | +32 | 81 | Qualification for League One play-offs |
| 5 | Milton Keynes Dons | 46 | 22 | 14 | 10 | 84 | 47 | +37 | 80 | Qualification for League One play-offs |
| 6 | Stevenage | 46 | 18 | 19 | 9 | 69 | 44 | +25 | 73 | Qualification for League One play-offs |
| 7 | Notts County | 46 | 21 | 10 | 15 | 75 | 63 | +12 | 73 | |
| 8 | Carlisle United | 46 | 18 | 15 | 13 | 65 | 66 | −1 | 69 | |
| 9 | Brentford | 46 | 18 | 13 | 15 | 63 | 52 | +11 | 67 | |
| 10 | Colchester United | 46 | 13 | 20 | 13 | 61 | 66 | −5 | 59 | |
| 11 | AFC Bournemouth | 46 | 15 | 13 | 18 | 48 | 52 | −4 | 58 | |
| 12 | Tranmere Rovers | 46 | 14 | 14 | 18 | 49 | 53 | −4 | 56 | |
| 13 | Hartlepool United | 46 | 14 | 14 | 18 | 50 | 55 | −5 | 56 | |
| 14 | Bury | 46 | 15 | 11 | 20 | 60 | 79 | −19 | 56 | |
| 15 | Preston North End | 46 | 13 | 15 | 18 | 54 | 68 | −14 | 54 | |
| 16 | Oldham Athletic | 46 | 14 | 12 | 20 | 50 | 66 | −16 | 54 | |
| 17 | Yeovil Town | 46 | 14 | 12 | 20 | 59 | 80 | −21 | 54 | |
| 18 | Scunthorpe United | 46 | 10 | 22 | 14 | 55 | 59 | −4 | 52 | |
| 19 | Walsall | 46 | 10 | 20 | 16 | 51 | 57 | −6 | 50 | |
| 20 | Leyton Orient | 46 | 13 | 11 | 22 | 48 | 75 | −27 | 50 | |
| 21 | Wycombe Wanderers (R) | 46 | 11 | 10 | 25 | 65 | 88 | −23 | 43 | Relegation to Football League Two |
| 22 | Chesterfield (R) | 46 | 10 | 12 | 24 | 56 | 81 | −25 | 42 | Relegation to Football League Two |
| 23 | Exeter City (R) | 46 | 10 | 12 | 24 | 46 | 75 | −29 | 42 | Relegation to Football League Two |
| 24 | Rochdale (R) | 46 | 8 | 14 | 24 | 47 | 81 | −34 | 38 | Relegation to Football League Two |

Updated to match(es) played on 5 May 2012. Source: BBC Sport
Rules for classification: 1) Points; 2) Goal difference; 3) Number of goals scored
(C) Champions; (O) Play-off winners; (P) Promoted; (R) Relegated
Notes:

Leading goalscorer: Jordan Rhodes (Huddersfield) – 36

=== League Two ===
Swindon Town made an immediate return to League One, as Paolo Di Canio won the League Two title in his first season as a manager. Shrewsbury took the runners-up spot, going the entire season unbeaten at home and earning veteran manager Graham Turner his second promotion with the club 33 years after his first. Crawley Town were the third automatically promoted team, and earned their second successive promotion. Despite the resignation of legendary manager Dario Gradi early in the season, Crewe Alexandra rallied under new manager Steve Davis and won promotion via the play-offs.

Macclesfield Town dropped out of the Football League after fifteen years, ultimately being undone by a horrific second half of the season in which they did not win a single game after the turn of the year. Hereford United suffered their second relegation from the League on the last day of the season, with Barnet securing last-day survival for the third season in a row.

Joining the League for the following season were newcomers Fleetwood Town, and York City, who returned to the League after an eight-year absence.

| Pos | Team | Pld | W | D | L | GF | GA | GD | Pts | Promotion, qualification or relegation |
|---|---|---|---|---|---|---|---|---|---|---|
| 1 | Swindon Town (C, P) | 46 | 29 | 6 | 11 | 75 | 32 | +43 | 93 | Promotion to Football League One |
| 2 | Shrewsbury Town (P) | 46 | 26 | 10 | 10 | 66 | 41 | +25 | 88 | Promotion to Football League One |
| 3 | Crawley Town (P) | 46 | 23 | 15 | 8 | 76 | 54 | +22 | 84 | Promotion to Football League One |
| 4 | Southend United | 46 | 25 | 8 | 13 | 77 | 48 | +29 | 83 | Qualification for League Two play-offs (Note: Four teams play for one spot and promotion to Football League One.) |
| 5 | Torquay United | 46 | 23 | 12 | 11 | 63 | 50 | +13 | 81 | Qualification for League Two play-offs |
| 6 | Cheltenham Town | 46 | 23 | 8 | 15 | 66 | 50 | +16 | 77 | Qualification for League Two play-offs |
| 7 | Crewe Alexandra (O, P) | 46 | 20 | 12 | 14 | 67 | 59 | +8 | 72 | Qualification for League Two play-offs |
| 8 | Gillingham | 46 | 20 | 10 | 16 | 79 | 62 | +17 | 70 | |
| 9 | Oxford United | 46 | 17 | 17 | 12 | 59 | 48 | +11 | 68 | |
| 10 | Rotherham United | 46 | 18 | 13 | 15 | 67 | 63 | +4 | 67 | |
| 11 | Aldershot Town | 46 | 19 | 9 | 18 | 54 | 52 | +2 | 66 | |
| 12 | Port Vale | 46 | 20 | 9 | 17 | 68 | 60 | +8 | 59 (Note: On 9 March Port Vale were deducted ten points for entering administration.) | |
| 13 | Bristol Rovers | 46 | 15 | 12 | 19 | 60 | 70 | −10 | 57 | |
| 14 | Accrington Stanley | 46 | 14 | 15 | 17 | 54 | 66 | −12 | 57 | |
| 15 | Morecambe | 46 | 14 | 14 | 18 | 63 | 57 | +6 | 56 | |
| 16 | AFC Wimbledon | 46 | 15 | 9 | 22 | 62 | 78 | −16 | 54 | |
| 17 | Burton Albion | 46 | 14 | 12 | 20 | 54 | 81 | −27 | 54 | |
| 18 | Bradford City | 46 | 12 | 14 | 20 | 54 | 59 | −5 | 50 | |
| 19 | Dagenham & Redbridge | 46 | 14 | 8 | 24 | 50 | 72 | −22 | 50 | |
| 20 | Northampton Town | 46 | 12 | 12 | 22 | 56 | 79 | −23 | 48 | |
| 21 | Plymouth Argyle | 46 | 10 | 16 | 20 | 47 | 64 | −17 | 46 | |
| 22 | Barnet | 46 | 12 | 10 | 24 | 52 | 79 | −27 | 46 | |
| 23 | Hereford United (R) | 46 | 10 | 14 | 22 | 50 | 70 | −20 | 44 | Relegation to the Conference Premier |
| 24 | Macclesfield Town (R) | 46 | 8 | 13 | 25 | 39 | 64 | −25 | 37 | Relegation to the Conference Premier |

Updated to match(es) played on 5 May 2012. Source: BBC Sport
Rules for classification: 1) Points; 2) Goal difference; 3) Number of goals scored
(C) Champions; (O) Play-off winners; (P) Promoted; (R) Relegated
Notes:

Leading goalscorers: Jack Midson (AFC Wimbledon), Izale McLeod (Barnet), Lewis Grabban (Rotherham United), and Adebayo Akinfenwa (Northampton Town) – 18

== Women's football ==
=== Women's Super League ===
| Pos | Team | Pld | W | D | L | GF | GA | GD | Pts | Qualification |
|---|---|---|---|---|---|---|---|---|---|---|
| 1 | Arsenal (C) | 14 | 10 | 4 | 0 | 39 | 18 | +21 | 34 | Qualification for the Champions League knockout phase |
| 2 | Birmingham City | 14 | 7 | 5 | 2 | 31 | 18 | +13 | 26 | Qualification for the Champions League knockout phase |
| 3 | Everton | 14 | 7 | 4 | 3 | 20 | 16 | +4 | 25 | |
| 4 | Bristol Academy | 14 | 4 | 6 | 4 | 17 | 16 | +1 | 18 | |
| 5 | Lincoln | 14 | 5 | 3 | 6 | 24 | 26 | −2 | 18 | |
| 6 | Chelsea | 14 | 5 | 2 | 7 | 20 | 23 | −3 | 17 | |
| 7 | Doncaster Rovers Belles | 14 | 3 | 2 | 9 | 14 | 28 | −14 | 11 | |
| 8 | Liverpool | 14 | 1 | 2 | 11 | 15 | 35 | −20 | 5 | |

Source: FA WSL results
Rules for classification: 1) Points; 2) Goal difference; 3) Number of goals scored
(C) Champions

=== Women's Premier League ===
==== National Division ====
| Pos | Team | Pld | W | D | L | GF | GA | GD | Pts | Qualification or relegation |
|---|---|---|---|---|---|---|---|---|---|---|
| 1 | Sunderland (C) | 18 | 13 | 3 | 2 | 49 | 18 | +31 | 42 | |
| 2 | Leeds United | 18 | 13 | 2 | 3 | 36 | 10 | +26 | 41 | |
| 3 | Aston Villa | 18 | 7 | 6 | 5 | 24 | 21 | +3 | 27 | |
| 4 | Barnet | 18 | 7 | 5 | 6 | 30 | 21 | +9 | 26 | |
| 5 | Charlton Athletic | 18 | 7 | 5 | 6 | 24 | 23 | +1 | 26 | |
| 6 | Coventry City | 18 | 7 | 5 | 6 | 19 | 19 | 0 | 26 | |
| 7 | Watford | 18 | 5 | 2 | 11 | 16 | 39 | −23 | 17 | |
| 8 | Cardiff City | 18 | 4 | 4 | 10 | 11 | 19 | −8 | 16 | |
| 9 | Reading (R) | 18 | 5 | 1 | 12 | 25 | 43 | −18 | 16 | Relegation to the Southern Division |
| 10 | Nottingham Forest (R) | 18 | 4 | 3 | 11 | 21 | 42 | −21 | 15 | Relegation to the Northern Division |

Updated to match(es) played on 17 May 2012. Source: FA WPL
Rules for classification: 1) points; 2) goal difference; 3) number of goals scored.
(C) Champions; (R) Relegated

==== Northern Division ====
| Pos | Team | Pld | W | D | L | GF | GA | GD | Pts | Promotion or relegation |
|---|---|---|---|---|---|---|---|---|---|---|
| 1 | Manchester City (C, P) | 18 | 13 | 1 | 4 | 58 | 19 | +39 | 40 | Promoted to National Division |
| 2 | Sheffield | 18 | 11 | 2 | 5 | 46 | 28 | +18 | 35 | |
| 3 | Leicester City | 18 | 10 | 4 | 4 | 43 | 21 | +22 | 34 | |
| 4 | Blackburn Rovers | 18 | 9 | 5 | 4 | 48 | 28 | +20 | 32 | |
| 5 | Derby County | 18 | 9 | 5 | 4 | 44 | 30 | +14 | 32 | |
| 6 | Sporting Club Albion | 18 | 8 | 5 | 5 | 39 | 26 | +13 | 29 | |
| 7 | Preston North End | 18 | 7 | 3 | 8 | 30 | 30 | 0 | 24 | |
| 8 | Rochdale | 18 | 4 | 3 | 11 | 26 | 40 | −14 | 15 | Club resigned from the league at the end of the season |
| 9 | Rotherham United (R) | 18 | 3 | 4 | 11 | 26 | 45 | −19 | 13 | Relegation to the Midland Combination League |
| 10 | Leeds City Vixens (R) | 18 | 0 | 0 | 18 | 13 | 106 | −93 | 0 | Relegation to the Northern Combination League |

Source: FA WPL
(C) Champions; (P) Promoted; (R) Relegated

==== Southern Division ====
| Pos | Team | Pld | W | D | L | GF | GA | GD | Pts | Promotion or relegation |
|---|---|---|---|---|---|---|---|---|---|---|
| 1 | Portsmouth (C, P) | 18 | 12 | 3 | 3 | 49 | 22 | +27 | 39 | Promotion to the National Division |
| 2 | Colchester United | 18 | 10 | 5 | 3 | 45 | 29 | +16 | 35 | |
| 3 | West Ham United | 18 | 10 | 4 | 4 | 36 | 22 | +14 | 34 | |
| 4 | Brighton & Hove Albion | 18 | 8 | 3 | 7 | 32 | 32 | 0 | 27 | |
| 5 | Gillingham | 18 | 6 | 5 | 7 | 21 | 28 | −7 | 23 | |
| 6 | Tottenham Hotspur | 18 | 6 | 4 | 8 | 28 | 29 | −1 | 22 | |
| 7 | Queen's Park Rangers | 18 | 5 | 5 | 8 | 25 | 34 | −9 | 20 | |
| 8 | Millwall Lionesses | 18 | 4 | 5 | 9 | 25 | 38 | −13 | 17 | |
| 9 | Plymouth Argyle (R) | 18 | 5 | 2 | 11 | 29 | 48 | −19 | 17 | Relegation to the South West Combination League |
| 10 | Keynsham Town (R) | 18 | 3 | 6 | 9 | 28 | 36 | −8 | 15 | Relegation to the South West Combination League |

Source: FA WPL
(C) Champions; (P) Promoted; (R) Relegated

=== FA Women's Cup ===
==== Final ====
26 May 2012
12:15 BST

| Birmingham City | 2–2 (a.e.t.) | Chelsea |
|---|---|---|
| Williams 90+1'; Carney 112' | Report | Lander 70'; Longhurst 101' |
Penalties
| Williams (penalty missed); Unitt (penalty scored); Taylor (penalty scored); Carney (penalty scored) | 3–2 | (penalty scored) Sherwood; (penalty missed) Spence; (penalty missed) Rafferty; (penalty scored) Buet; (penalty missed) Bonner |

Ashton Gate, Bristol
Attendance: 8,723
Referee: Natalie Walker (Lancashire)

=== FA WSL Cup ===
==== Final ====
10 October 2012
19:00 BST

| Arsenal | 1–0 | Birmingham City |
|---|---|---|
| Little 82' | Report |

Underhill Stadium, Barnet
Attendance: 2,535
Referee: Robert Massey-Ellis

== Managerial changes ==
| Name | Club | Date of departure | Replacement | Date of appointment |
|---|---|---|---|---|
| Peter Jackson | Bradford City | 25 August 2011 | Phil Parkinson | 29 August 2011 |
| Peter Reid | Plymouth Argyle | 18 September 2011 | Carl Fletcher | 1 November 2011 |
| Sean O'Driscoll | Doncaster Rovers | 23 September 2011 | Dean Saunders | 23 September 2011 |
| Steve McClaren | Nottingham Forest | 2 October 2011 | Steve Cotterill | 14 October 2011 |
| Keith Millen | Bristol City | 3 October 2011 | Derek McInnes | 19 October 2011 |
| Steve Cotterill | Portsmouth | 14 October 2011 | Michael Appleton | 10 November 2011 |
| Sven-Göran Eriksson | Leicester City | 24 October 2011 | Nigel Pearson | 15 November 2011 |
| Dario Gradi | Crewe Alexanda | 10 November 2011 | Steve Davis | 10 November 2011 |
| Gary Johnson | Northampton Town | 14 November 2011 | Adrian Boothroyd | 30 November 2011 |
| Nigel Pearson | Hull City | 15 November 2011 | Nick Barmby | 10 January 2012 |
| Steve Bruce | Sunderland | 30 November 2011 | Martin O'Neill | 3 December 2011 |
| Mick Wadsworth | Hartlepool United | 6 December 2011 | Neale Cooper | 28 December 2011 |
| Phil Brown | Preston North End | 14 December 2011 | Graham Westley | 13 January 2012 |
| Steve Eyre | Rochdale | 19 December 2011 | John Coleman | 24 January 2012 |
| Paul Buckle | Bristol Rovers | 4 January 2012 | Mark McGhee | 18 January 2012 |
| Neil Warnock | Queens Park Rangers | 8 January 2012 | Mark Hughes | 10 January 2012 |
| Terry Skiverton | Yeovil Town | 9 January 2012 | Gary Johnson | 9 January 2012 |
| Graham Westley | Stevenage | 13 January 2012 | Gary Smith | 25 January 2012 |
| John Coleman | Accrington Stanley | 24 January 2012 | Paul Cook | 13 February 2012 |
| Simon Grayson | Leeds United | 1 February 2012 | Neil Warnock | 18 February 2012 |
| Mick McCarthy | Wolverhampton Wanderers | 13 February 2012 | Terry Connor | 24 February 2012 |
| Lee Clark | Huddersfield Town | 16 February 2012 | Simon Grayson | 20 February 2012 |
| Martin Allen | Notts County | 18 February 2012 | Keith Curle | 20 February 2012 |
| Gary Megson | Sheffield Wednesday | 29 February 2012 | Dave Jones | 1 March 2012 |
| André Villas-Boas | Chelsea | 4 March 2012 | Roberto Di Matteo | 4 March 2012 |
| Les Parry | Tranmere Rovers | 4 March 2012 | Ronnie Moore | 4 March 2012 |
| Jamie Pitman | Hereford United | 5 March 2012 | Richard O'Kelly | 5 March 2012 |
| Paul Peschisolido | Burton Albion | 17 March 2012 | Gary Rowett | 10 May 2012 |
| Gary Simpson | Macclesfield Town | 18 March 2012 | Brian Horton | 19 March 2012 |
| Andy Scott | Rotherham United | 19 March 2012 | Steve Evans | 9 April 2012 |
| Lee Bradbury | AFC Bournemouth | 25 March 2012 | Paul Groves | 11 May 2012 |
| Steve Evans | Crawley Town | 9 April 2012 | Sean O'Driscoll | 16 May 2012 |
| Lawrie Sanchez | Barnet | 16 April 2012 | Martin Allen | 16 April 2012 |
| Brian Horton | Macclesfield Town | 30 April 2012 | Steve King | 21 May 2012 |
| Nick Barmby | Hull City | 8 May 2012 | Steve Bruce | 8 June 2012 |
| Andy Hessenthaler | Gillingham | 8 May 2012 | Martin Allen | 5 July 2012 |
| Terry Connor | Wolverhampton Wanderers | 11 May 2012 | Ståle Solbakken | 1 July 2012 |
| Richard O'Kelly | Hereford United | 12 May 2012 | Martin Foyle | 30 May 2012 |
| Roy Hodgson | West Bromwich Albion | 14 May 2012 | Steve Clarke | 8 June 2012 |
| Alex McLeish | Aston Villa | 14 May 2012 | Paul Lambert | 2 June 2012 |
| Kenny Dalglish | Liverpool | 16 May 2012 | Brendan Rodgers | 30 May 2012 |
| Martin Allen | Barnet | 25 May 2012 | Mark Robson | 11 June 2012 |
| Brendan Rodgers | Swansea City | 30 May 2012 | Michael Laudrup | 15 June 2012 |
| Paul Lambert | Norwich City | 2 June 2012 | Chris Hughton | 7 June 2012 |
| Chris Hughton | Birmingham City | 7 June 2012 | Lee Clark | 26 June 2012 |
| Harry Redknapp | Tottenham Hotspur | 13 June 2012 | Andre Villas Boas | 3 July 2012 |
