= 2012 FA Cup =

2012 FA Cup may refer to:

- 2011–12 FA Cup
  - 2012 FA Cup final
- 2011–12 FA Women's Cup
  - 2012 FA Women's Cup final
- 2012–13 FA Cup
- 2012–13 FA Women's Cup
