= 2011–12 FA Women's Cup =

41st season of the association football knockout competition

Tournament details
- Country: England; Wales
- Teams: 276

Final positions
- Champions: Birmingham City
- Runners-up: Chelsea

The 2011–12 FA Women's Cup is the 42nd season of the association football knockout competition. 276 clubs competed for the years trophy. The winners will not qualify for the UEFA Women's Champions League. The current holders are now Birmingham City. They beat Chelsea 3–2 in a penalty shootout after a 2–2 draw in the final at Ashton Gate.

== Teams ==
Round	Clubs remaining	Clubs involved	Winners from previous round	New entries this round	Leagues entering at this round
First round qualifying	276	180	0	180	
Second round qualifying	186	104	90	14	
Third round qualifying	134	96	52	44	Northern Combination WFL/Midland Combination WFL/South West Combination WFL/South East Combination WFL
First round proper	86	48	48	0	
Second round proper	62	44	24	20	FA WPL Northern/Southern Divisions
Third round proper	40	32	22	10	FA WPL National Division
Fourth round proper	24	16	16	0	
Fifth round proper	16	16	8	8	FA Women's Super League
Sixth round proper (QF)	8	8	8	0	
Semi–Final	4	4	4	0	
Final	2	2	2	0	

== Calendar ==
Round	Main date	Prize money
First round qualifying	Sunday, 2 October 2011	£125
Second round qualifying	Sunday, 23 October 2011	£175
Third round qualifying	Sunday, 13 November 2011	£225
First round proper	Sunday, 11 December 2011	£250
Second round proper	Sunday, 8 January 2012	£300
Third round proper	Sunday, 5 February 2012	£400
Fourth round proper	Sunday, 26 February 2012	£500
Fifth round proper	Sunday, 11 March 2012	£600
Sixth round proper (QF)	Sunday, 25 March 2012	£1,000
Semi–Final	Sunday, 15 April 2012	£2,000
Final	Sunday, 26 May 2012	£2,000/£5,000

== First round qualifying ==
Tie	Home team (tier)	Score	Away team (tier)	Att.
1	Abbey Rangers	1–5	Haywards Heath Town	
2	Abbeytown	3–1	Forest Hall	
3	Accrington Girls & Ladies	0–4	Blackpool Wren Rovers	
4	AFC Telford United	0–3	Allscott	
5	AFC Wimbledon	3–1	East Preston	
6	Aldershot Town	2–0	Poole Town	
7	Arnold Town	2–0	Oadby & Wigston	
8	Ashford	0–4	Chichester City	
9	Ashington CFC	3–2	Prudhoe Town	
10	Aylesbury United	1–5	Newbury	
11	Barnsley	9–0	Ossett Albion	
12	Bexhill United	2–1	Knaphill	
13	Bilbrook	7–0	Rugby Town	
14	Bitton	4–1	AEK–BOCO	
15	Blackpool	13–0	Southport Birkdale	
16	Bolton Wanderers	2–5	Tranmere Rovers	
17	Bracknell Town	7–0	Beaconsfield SYCOB	
18	Bradford Park Avenue	1–6	Keighley Oaks	
19	Braintree Town	2–3	Billericay Town	
20	Brandon Town	A–W	Woodbridge Town	
Walkover for Woodbridge Town
21	Brantham Athletic	5–3	Bungay Town	
22	Brighouse Athletic	0–2	Padiham	
23	Brighouse Town	0–3	Crewe Alexandra	
24	Cheltenham Town	4–2 (a.e.t.)	Ilminster Town	
25	Chester City	4–6 (a.e.t.)	Birkenhead	
26	Colne Valley	H–W	Henley Town	
Walkover for Colne Valley
27	Copleston	0–10	C&K Basildon	
28	Corby Stewarts & Lloyds	A–W	Cogenhoe & Kingsthorpe	
Walkover for Cogenhoe & Kingsthorpe
29	Crawley Wasps	5–0	Meridian	
30	Crusaders	3–2	Malvern Town	
31	Denham United	3–0	Marlow	
32	Downend Flyers	3–5	Bristol Union	
33	Durham Wildcats	4–0	Penrith AFC	
34	Eastbourne	1–1 (4–5 p)	South Park	
35	Fakenham Town	2–1	East Thurrock United	
36	Headington	1–3	Launton	
37	Hereford Pegasus	1–5	Stratford Town	
38	Hethersett Athletic	3–1 (a.e.t.)	Haverhill Rovers	
39	Hoddesdon Owls	1–5	Hemel Hempstead Town	
40	Huntingdon Town	0–2	AFC Trinity	
41	Kettering Town	10–0	Peterborough Hampton	
42	Kick In Kulan I Krysset United (KIKK)	7–2	Leverstock Green	
43	Lancaster City	2–4	Warrington Town	
44	Leighton United Vixens	2–1 (a.e.t.)	Tring Athletic	
45	Leyton	3–1	Haringey Borough	
46	Lichfield Diamonds	2–0	Walsall	
47	London Corinthians	3–2 (a.e.t.)	Rottingdean Village	
48	Long Eaton United	8–0	Asfordby Amateurs	

Tie	Home team (tier)	Score	Away team (tier)	Att.
49	Lowick United	7–2	Cramlington United	
50	Lumley	2–1	Consett	
51	Maidstone Association Local Government Officers (MALGO)	1–2	Westfield	
52	Mansfield Town	7–5	Nettleham	
53	Marine Academy Plymouth	A–W	Exeter City	
Walkover for Exeter City.
54	Mauritius Sports Association (MSA)	2–0	Stevenage	
55	Morecambe	4–2	Middleton Athletic	
56	Moulton	3–1 (a.e.t.)	Rothwell Town	
57	New Forest	1–13	Parley Sports	
58	North Ferriby United	4–0	Appleby Frodingham	
59	North Shields	1–3	Norton & Stockton Ancients	
60	Oxford City	4–2	Banbury United	
61	Oxford United	5–2	Maidenhead United	
62	Parkwood Rangers	3–3 (2–4 p)	Rusthall	
63	Pen Mill	1–2	St Nicholas	
64	Peterborough Northern Star	2–1	Brackley Sports	
65	Peterborough Sports	5–2	Daventry Town	
66	Purbeck	0–4	Andover New Street	
67	RACA Tynedale	3–2	Birtley Town	
68	Ramsgate	2–9	Eastbourne Town	
69	Reading Town	3–4 (a.e.t.)	Brentford	
70	Redcar Town	4–0	Percy Main	
71	Retford United	2–1	Dronfield Town	
72	Salisbury City	0–1 (a.e.t.)	Weymouth	
73	Sawbridgeworth Town	1–6	Arlesey Town	
74	Scunthorpe United	2–3	Rothwell	
75	Shanklin	12–0	Broadstone	
76	Sheffield United Community	3–0	Hull City	
77	Sheffield United Junior Blades	1–2	Steel City Wanderers	
78	Shepton Mallet	0–8	???	
79	Southam United	A–W	Coventry Sphinx	
Walkover for Coventry Sphinx.
80	St Francis 2000	6–3	Peterlee RA	
81	Stafford Town	4–0	Wyrley	
82	Stoke Lane Athletic	2–4	Frome Town	
83	Swindon Spitfires	0–1 (a.e.t.)	Bridgwater Town	
84	Swindon Supermarine	3–1	Forest Of Dean	
85	Teesside Sport	0–4	California	
86	Tyneside	H–W	Whitehaven	
Walkover for Tyneside.
87	Victoire	1–7	Maidstone Town	
88	West	4–2	Thorpe United	
89	Whitley Bay	8–1	Kendal Town	
90	Wymondham Town	0–8	Chelmsford City	

== Second round qualifying ==
Tie	Home team (tier)	Score	Away team (tier)	Att.
1	Abbeytown	1–3	Whitley Bay	
2	AFC Trinity	5–3	Cogenhoe & Kingsthorpe	
3	AFC Wimbledon	3–4 (3–3 p)	London Corinthians	
4	Aldershot Town	0–2	Southampton	
5	Andover New Street	0–3	Weymouth	
6	Arnold Town	9–0	West Bridgford	
7	Ashington CFC	4–3	Redcar Town	
8	Barking	5–1	Arlesey Town	
9	Barnsley	5–3	Keighley Oaks	
10	Bexhill United	4–2	Haywards Heath Town	
11	Billericay Town	H–W	Woodbridge Town	
Walkover for Billericay Town.
12	Birkenhead	0–3	Morecambe	
13	Bitton	0–4	???	
14	Blackpool Wren Rovers	2–1	Padiham	
15	Bracknell Town	5–0	Launton	
16	Brentford	1–2	Oxford City	
17	Bristol Union	3–2	Swindon Supermarine	
18	California	3–1	Tyneside	
19	Chelmsford City	0–7	Hethersett Athletic	
20	Cheltenham Town	0–3	Bridgwater Town	
21	Chichester City	4–1	Maidstone Town	
22	Christchurch	0–6	Shanklin	
23	Coventry Sphinx	4–1	Kenilworth Town	
24	Crusaders	2–2 (3–1 p)	Cottage Farm Rangers	
25	Denham United	8–1	Colne Valley	
26	Eastbourne Town	2–3	Crawley Wasps	

Tie	Home team (tier)	Score	Away team (tier)	Att.
27	Fakenham Town	1–4	C&K Basildon	
28	Falmouth Town	0–1	Launceston	
29	Hemel Hempstead Town	3–1	Leighton United Vixens	
30	Kettering Town	0–5	Peterborough Sports	
31	Kick In Kulan I Krysset United (KIKK)	0–3	Hampstead	
32	Lichfield Diamonds	6–1	Allscott	
33	Locks Heath	0–3	Parley Sports	
34	Long Eaton United	8–1	Retford United	
35	Lowick United	4–2 (a.e.t.)	Norton & Stockton Ancients	
36	Mauritius Sports Association (MSA)	3–1	Leyton	
37	Morley Rangers	0–9	Exeter City	
38	Newbury	0–12	Oxford United	
39	North Ferriby United	0–15	Rothwell	
40	Peterborough Northern Star	8–1	Moulton	
41	RACA Tynedale	1–6	Durham Wildcats	
42	Rusthall	2–2 (4–2 p)	Panthers	
43	Sandiacre Town	1–3	Mansfield Town	
44	Sheffield United Community	6–0	Steel City Wanderers	
45	South Park	1–4	Westfield	
46	St Francis 2000	13–2	Lumley	
47	St Nicholas	1–3	Frome Town	
48	Stafford Town	1–4	Bilbrook	
49	Stratford Town	4–3	FC Reedswood	
50	Tranmere Rovers	3–2	Blackpool	
51	Warrington Town	0–7	Crewe Alexandra	
52	West	3–1	Brantham Athletic	

== Third round qualifying ==
Tie	Home team (tier)	Score	Away team (tier)	Att.
1	AFC Trinity	H–W	Dudley United	
Walkover for AFC Trinity.
2	Arnold Town	0–1	Coventry Sphinx	
3	Ashington CFC	2–3 (a.e.t.)	California	
4	Bexhill United	1–6	Bracknell Town	
5	Blackpool Wren Rovers	4–2	Lowick United	
6	Bridgwater Town	1–5	Swindon Town	
7	Bristol Union	2–6	Forest Green Rovers	
8	C&K Basildon	3–1	Hemel Hempstead Town	
9	Chichester City	7–0	Rusthall	
10	Crewe Alexandra	2–3	Crusaders	
11	Crystal Palace	1–2	Crawley Wasps	
12	Denham United	1–1 (3–2 p)	Southampton Saints	
13	Durham Wildcats	3–0	Barnsley	
14	Ebbsfleet United	3–0	Barking	
15	Exeter City	4–0	Keynsham Town Development	
16	Hampstead	1–2	Cambridge United	
17	Hethersett Athletic	0–5	Enfield Town	
18	Huddersfield Town	1–2	Bradford City	
19	Ipswich Town	H–W	West	
Walkover for Ipswich Town
20	Larkhall Athletic	5–2 (a.e.t.)	Gloucester City	
21	Leicester City Ladies	4–0	Northampton Town	
22	Lewes	4–1 (a.e.t.)	University Of Portsmouth	
23	Lichfield Diamonds	1–5	Stoke City	
24	Liverpool Feds	1–0 (a.e.t.)	Salford	

Tie	Home team (tier)	Score	Away team (tier)	Att.
25	London Corinthians	0–5	Oxford United	
26	Loughborough Students	14–0	Bilbrook	
27	Luton Town	0–1	Peterborough Sports	
28	Mansfield Town	3–4	Copsewood Coventry	
29	Mauritius Sports Association (MSA)	4–3 (a.e.t.)	Milton Keynes Dons	
30	Morecambe	2–3	Sheffield United Community	
31	Mossley Hill	6–0	Curzon Ashton	
32	Newquay	3–2	Frome Town	
33	Norwich City	4–3	Chesham United	
34	Old Actonians	2–6	Billericay Town	
35	Parley Sports	3–1	Launceston	
36	Peterborough Northern Star	4–3 (a.e.t.)	Brentwood Town	
37	Radcliffe Olympic	3–1	Long Eaton United	
38	Rothwell	0–4	Newcastle United	
39	South Durham & Cestria	9–0	Wakefield	
40	Southampton	2–3	Weymouth	
41	Stockport County	8–0	St Francis 2000	
42	Stratford Town	3–6	Loughborough Foxes	
43	Tranmere Rovers	0–4	Sheffield Wednesday	
44	Westfield	3–0	Oxford City	
45	Whitley Bay	2–3	Middlesbrough	
46	Wolverhampton Wanderers	3–2 (a.e.t.)	Leafield Athletic	
47	Yeovil Town	1–2 (a.e.t.)	Shanklin	
Bye: Havant & Waterlooville

== First round proper ==
Tie	Home team (tier)	Score	Away team (tier)	Att.
1	AFC Trinity	2–5	Leicester City Ladies	
2	Billericay Town	3–6 (a.e.t.)	Peterborough Northern Star	
3	Blackpool Wren Rovers	3–2	Mossley Hill	
4	Bracknell Town	0–5	Enfield Town	
5	Bradford City	3–2	Newcastle United	
6	C&K Basildon	0–3	Lewes	
7	California	0–8	Durham Wildcats	
8	Cambridge United	2–5	Oxford United	
9	Chichester City	5–2	Peterborough Sports	
10	Copsewood Coventry	3–6 (a.e.t.)	Stoke City	
11	Crawley Wasps	H–W	Ipswich Town	
Walkover for Crawley Wasps.
12	Crusaders	0–3	Coventry Sphinx	
13	Ebbsfleet United	1–5	Havant & Waterlooville	
14	Forest Green Rovers	5–1	Weymouth	
15	Liverpool Feds	1–3	Sheffield Wednesday	
16	Loughborough Foxes	3–0	Radcliffe Olympic	
17	Loughborough Students	5–3 (a.e.t.)	Wolverhampton Wanderers	
18	Mauritius Sports Association (MSA)	2–1	Westfield	
19	Newquay	2–2 (6–7 p)	Larkhall Athletic	
20	Norwich City	0–3	Denham United	
21	Shanklin	3–1	Parley Sports	
22	Sheffield United Community	0–1	Middlesbrough	
23	Stockport County	2–3	South Durham & Cestria	
24	Swindon Town	2–1	Exeter City	

== Second round proper ==
Lowest team remaining at start of round: Durham Wildcats (3rd place Durham WFL level 7 of pyramid)

Tie	Home team (tier)	Score	Away team (tier)	Att.
1	Blackpool Wren Rovers	3–4	Rotherham United	
2	Brighton & Hove Albion	2–1	Millwall Lionesses	
3	Chichester City	0–3	West Ham United	
4	Coventry Sphinx	0–1	Peterborough Northern Star	
5	Crawley Wasps	0–0 (0–3 p)	Mauritius Sports Association (MSA)	
6	Derby County	3–1 (a.e.t.)	Loughborough Foxes	
7	Enfield Town	1–1 (4–3 p)	Queens Park Rangers	
8	Gillingham	3–0	Colchester United	
9	Havant & Waterlooville	3–2	Plymouth Argyle	
10	Keynsham Town	7–1	Swindon Town	
11	Larkhall Athletic	2–1	Shanklin	
12	Leicester City Ladies	2–1	Loughborough Students	
13	Leicester City	0–1	Sporting Club Albion	
14	Manchester City	9–1	Leeds City Vixens	
15	Oxford United	2–0	Lewes	
16	Portsmouth	4–1	Forest Green Rovers	
17	Preston North End	7–3	Stoke City	
18	Rochdale	1–2	Blackburn Rovers	
19	Sheffield	10–0	Middlesbrough	
20	Sheffield Wednesday	1–4	Durham Wildcats	
21	South Durham & Cestria	0–3	Bradford City	
22	Tottenham Hotspur	7–0	Denham United	

== Third round proper ==
=== Draw ===
The lowest team remaining in the competition at the start of the round are: Durham Wildcats
All matches scheduled for Sunday, 5 February 2012 at 2pm. After a complete postponement due to snow on the 5th 12 of the 16 fixtures were again postponed due to snow on the 12th. The remaining fixtures are rescheduled for 19 February.

League and place of home team	Home team	Visiting team	League and place of away team
Southwest Region WFL Premier #1	Larkhall Athletic	Tottenham Hotspur	FA WPL Southern #6
FA WPL Southern #4	Brighton & Hove Albion	Havant & Waterlooville	South West Combination WFL #3
FA WPL National #3	Charlton Athletic	Bradford City	Northern Combination WFL #3
South East Combination WFL #3	Enfield Town	MSA	London and South East Div 1 #7
FA WPL Southern #3	Portsmouth	Sheffield	FA WPL Northern #4
FA WPL National #10	Watford	Leeds United	FA WPL National #2
FA WPL National #6	Aston Villa	Coventry City	FA WPL National #5
FA WPL Northern #5	Derby County	West Ham United	FA WPL Southern #2
FA WPL National #1	Sunderland	Rotherham United	FA WPL Northern #9
FA WPL National #9	Nottingham Forest	Blackburn Rovers	FA WPL Northern #6
FA WPL National #4	Barnet	Peterborough Northern Star	East Midlands WFL Premier #3
FA WPL Northern #3	Sporting Club Albion	Reading	FA WPL National #7

=== Results ===
Tie	Home team (tier)	Score	Away team (tier)	Att.
1	Aston Villa (2)	0–2	Coventry City (2)	
2	Barnet (2)	8–0	Peterborough Northern Star	
3	Brighton & Hove Albion (3)	4–2	Havant & Waterlooville	
4	Charlton Athletic (2)	3–1	Bradford City (4)	
5	Derby County (3)	4–2 (a.e.t.)	West Ham United (3)	
6	Durham Wildcats	0–2	Preston North End (3)	
7	Enfield Town	2–0	Mauritius Sports Association	
8	Keynsham Town (3)	4–1	Gillingham (3)	
9	Larkhall Athletic	1–1 (4–3 p)	Tottenham Hotspur (3)	
10	Leicester City Ladies (4)	1–2	Cardiff City (2)	
11	Manchester City (3)	4–1	Oxford United	
12	Nottingham Forest (2)	0–3	Blackburn Rovers (3)	
13	Portsmouth (3)	1–3	Sheffield (3)	
14	Sporting Club Albion (3)	3–0	Reading (2)	
15	Sunderland (2)	8–0	Rotherham United (3)	
16	Watford (2)	1–6	Leeds United (2)	

== Fourth round proper ==
=== Draw ===
The lowest team remaining in the competition is: Larkhall Athletic 2nd Place South West Premier Division (Level 5 of pyramid)
All matches scheduled for Sunday, 26 February 2012 at 2pm GST.

League and place of home team	Home team	Visiting team	League and place of away team
FA WPL National #4	Barnet	Sporting Club Albion	FA WPL Northern #3
FA WPL Southern #4	Brighton & Hove Albion	Larkhall Athletic	Southwest Region WFL Premier #2
FA WPL National #3	Charlton Athletic	Derby County	FA WPL Northern #5
FA WPL National #8	Cardiff City	Sunderland	FA WPL National #1
FA WPL National #5	Coventry City	Leeds United	FA WPL National #2
FA WPL Northern #6	Preston North End	Blackburn Rovers	FA WPL Northern #7
South East Combination WFL #3	Enfield Town	Manchester City	FA WPL Northern #2
FA WPL Southern #7	Keynsham Town	Sheffield	FA WPL Northern #4

=== Results ===
26 February 2012	Barnet (2)	3–0	Sporting Club Albion (3)	Chipping Barnet
	Goal	Report		Stadium: Underhill Stadium

26 February 2012	Brighton & Hove Albion (3)	3–0	Larkhall Athletic (5)	Brighton
	Goal	Report		Stadium: Withdean Stadium

26 February 2012	Cardiff City (2)	0–7	Sunderland (2)	Cardiff
		Report	Goal	Stadium: Cardiff International Sports Campus

26 February 2012	Charlton Athletic (2)	2–0	Derby County (3)	Thamesmead
	Goal	Report		Stadium: Bayliss Avenue

26 February 2012	Coventry City (2)	1–2	Leeds United (2)	Bedworth
	Goal	Report	Goal	Stadium: The Oval

26 February 2012	Enfield Town (4)	0–2	Manchester City (3)	Enfield
		Report	Grocott 40'; Buffel 75'	Stadium: Queen Elizabeth II Stadium

26 February 2012	Keynsham Town (3)	5–2	Sheffield (3)	Keynsham
	Goal	Report	Goal	Stadium: Crown Field

26 February 2012	Preston North End (3)	0–2	Blackburn Rovers (3)	Bamber Bridge
		Report	Goal	Stadium: Irongate

== Fifth round proper ==
=== Draw ===
The lowest teams remaining in the competition are: Keynsham Town 7th Place FA Women's Southern Division and Blackburn Rovers 7th Place FA Women's Northern Division (Level 3 of pyramid). All matches scheduled for Sunday, 11 March 2012 at 2pm GST.

League and place of home team	Home team	Visiting team	League and place of away team
FA WPL Southern #7	Keynsham Town	Sunderland	FA WPL National #1
FA WSL #5	Bristol Academy WFC	Leeds United	FA WPL National #2
FA WPL National #4	Barnet	Doncaster Rovers Belles	FA WSL #7
FA WPL National #3	Charlton Athletic	Blackburn Rovers	FA WPL Northern #7
FA WSL #4	Lincoln	Arsenal	FA WSL #1
FA WSL #2	Birmingham City	Liverpool	FA WSL #8
FA WPL Northern #2	Manchester City	Everton	FA WSL #3
FA WSL #6	Chelsea	Brighton & Hove Albion	FA WPL Southern #4

=== Results ===
11 March 2012	Lincoln (1)	0–1	Arsenal (1)	Lincoln
		Report	White 16'	Stadium: Ashby Avenue; Attendance: 364; Referee: Robert Ellis

11 March 2012	Bristol Academy (1)	3–0	Leeds United (2)	Filton
	Watts 13'; Rose 41'; Del Río 90+4'	Report		Stadium: Stoke Gifford Stadium

11 March 2012	Manchester City (3)	1–5	Everton (1)	Cheadle
	Johnston 70'	Report	Hinnigan 4'; Duggan 26', 32', 82'; Williams 87' (pen.)	Stadium: Park Road Stadium

11 March 2012	Birmingham City (1)	3–0	Liverpool (1)	Tiddington
	Taylor 20'; Christiansen 62'; Ballard 90'	Report		Stadium: The DCS Stadium; Attendance: 185

11 March 2012	Chelsea (1)	3–0	Brighton & Hove Albion (3)	Staines-upon-Thames
	Buet 80'; Bleazard 82'; Lappin 86'	Report		Stadium: Wheatsheaf Park; Attendance: 282

11 March 2012	Barnet (2)	1–2 (a.e.t.)	Doncaster Rovers Belles (1)	Chipping Barnet
	Prosser 2'	Report	S. Smith 8'; L. Little 120'	Stadium: Underhill Stadium

11 March 2012	Charlton Athletic (2)	1–5	Blackburn Rovers (3)	Thamesmead
	Bryan	Report	Forster; Donoghue; Sheen; Anderton	Stadium: Bayliss Avenue

11 March 2012	Keynsham Town (3)	1–5	Sunderland (2)	Keynsham
	Clipston	Report	McDougall; Gutteridge; Mead; Atkinson	Stadium: Crown Field; Attendance: 150

== Quarter–finals ==
The lowest team remaining in the competition is: Blackburn Rovers 7th Place FA Women's Northern Division (Level 3 of pyramid). Matches were played on 25 March 2012.

25 March 2012	Doncaster Rovers Belles (1)	0–2	Chelsea (1)	Doncaster
14:00		Report	Bonner 72'; Susi 81'	Stadium: Keepmoat Stadium; Attendance: 512

25 March 2012	Bristol Academy (1)	3–0	Blackburn Rovers (3)	Filton
14:00	Green 7'; Del Río 24', 55'	Report		Stadium: Stoke Gifford Stadium; Attendance: 238

25 March 2012	Arsenal (1)	2–1	Everton (1)	Borehamwood
14:00	White 58'; Little 64'	Report	Hinnigan 85'	Stadium: Meadow Park; Attendance: 414

25 March 2012	Birmingham City (1)	4–0	Sunderland (2)	Stratford upon Avon
14:00	Harrop 22', 42'; Taylor 24'; Aluko 83'	Report		Stadium: The DCS Stadium; Attendance: 227

== Semi–finals ==
Matches were played on the 15 April and the 3 May 2012.

15 April 2012	Birmingham City (1)	4–1	Bristol Academy (1)	Tamworth
14:00	Williams 9', 66'; Carney 39', 43'	Report	del Río 81'	Stadium: The Lamb Ground; Attendance: 358; Referee: Paul Forrester

3 May 2012	Chelsea (1)	2–0	Arsenal (1)	Brentford
19:45	Bleazard 22'; Susi 85'	Report		Stadium: Griffin Park; Attendance: 559; Referee: Alexandra Ihringova

== Final ==
26 May 2012
12:15 BST

Birmingham City	2–2 (a.e.t.)	Chelsea
Williams 90+1'; Carney 112'	Report	Lander 70'; Longhurst 101'
Penalties
Williams (penalty missed); Unitt (penalty scored); Taylor (penalty scored); Carney (penalty scored)	3–2	(penalty scored) Sherwood; (penalty missed) Spence; (penalty missed) Rafferty; (penalty scored) Buet; (penalty missed) Bonner

Ashton Gate, Bristol
Attendance: 8,723
Referee: Natalie Walker (Lancashire)
