= 2012 FA Women's Cup final =

English football cup final

- The match programme cover
- Event: 2011–12 FA Women's Cup
Birmingham City	Chelsea
2	2
- Birmingham City won 3–2 on penalties
- Date: 26 May 2012
- Venue: Ashton Gate, Bristol
- Player of the Match: Karen Carney (Birmingham City)
- Referee: Natalie Walker (Lancashire)
- Attendance: 8,723

The 2012 FA Women's Cup final was the 42nd final of the FA Women's Cup. 276 clubs competed for the years trophy. The winners did not qualify for the UEFA Women's Champions League.

Birmingham City, beat Chelsea 3–2 in a penalty shoot-out after a 2–2 draw in the final at Ashton Gate.

The match was televised live by Sky Sports 2. The channel's decision to switch the transmission of the penalty shoot-out to behind the red button was criticised and described as embarrassing. The attendance of 8,723 was the lowest at the FA Women's Cup final since 2005. Entertainment at the final included a half time performance from The Risk, a boy band who had finished 10th in the previous year's edition of The X Factor.

== Route to the final ==
=== Birmingham City ===
Round	Opposition	Score
5th	Liverpool (h)	3–0
6th	Sunderland (h)	4–0
SF	Bristol Academy (n)	4–1

As an FA WSL team, Birmingham City entered the competition in the fifth round, where they were drawn at home to Liverpool. They were rewarded for their first half performance on 26 minutes, when Jodie Taylor struck to put them a goal up. It was 2-0 just moments later after the half-time though, when Liverpool's goalie Aroon Clansey rushed from her line to deny Carney, only to see her header fall to Isobel Christiansen, who showed terrific instincts to volley into the unguarded net from around 35 yards out. With seconds left, the home side did increase their lead when a Chelsea Weston pass found its way to substitute Maz Ballard, who touched the ball past Clansey before poking the ball into the empty net from close range, to give Birmingham a 3-0 win.

Birmingham faced Sunderland in the sixth round at Stratford Town. Kerys Harrop scored in the 22nd minute to give Birmingham the lead. Taylor very nearly bagged a second moments later – only for her goal-bound attempt to be saved by Sunderland 'keeper Rachael Laws. The hosts were able to coast through the remainder of the first-half, but still had the appetite for a third goal courtesy of Harrop. With Blues fully in control, Eniola Aluko added a fourth after 83 minutes, to give Birmingham a 4-0 victory.

Bristol Academy were the opponents in the semi-final, held at Tamworth. Birmingham made the best possible start at Tamworth FC – taking the lead through Rachel William's header on nine minutes. An eventful start produced more drama shortly afterwards the opener, when Carney's goal-bound corner was handled on the line by Bristol Academy's Alex Culvin, leaving the referee no option but to brandish a red card. The Vixens were lucky not to receive further punishment, however, due to Williams hacking the resulting penalty wide. With David Parker's side firmly in the ascendancy, there was little action to speak of in the remainder of the first-half, that was until Carney bagged two quick fire braces shortly before the break. Williams' second was equally as emphatic – smashing home Jodie Taylor's looping cross. Mark Sampson's team grabbed a consolation courtesy of Laura del Río's strike late on, but this couldn’t take the gloss off a memorable day for the Ladies, but Birmingham secure their place in the final for the first time in the FA Women's Cup history.

=== Chelsea ===
Round	Opposition	Score
5th	Brighton & Hove Albion (h)	3–0
6th	Doncaster Rovers Belles (a)	0–2
SF	Arsenal (n)	2–0

Chelsea – also a FA WSL team – entered the competition in the fifth round as well. Their opening match was a 3–0 home win against Brighton & Hove Albion. After a goalless first half Dunia Susi struck early in the second, before Helen Bleazard and Sue Lappin scored to give Chelsea a 3–0 win.

Chelsea were drawn to play at away against Doncaster Rovers Belles in the sixth round. From Sophie Ingle's corner kick, her high delivery was met at the far post by Gemma Bonner, who prodded home from a yard out to give Chelsea the advantage. From Danielle Buet's delivery, Bonner flicked onto Susi, who was not to be denied, meeting the ball with a powerful header into the top corner to secure Chelsea's place in the final four with a 2-0 win.

Chelsea faced Arsenal in the semi-final at Brentford. Chelsea took the lead in stunning fashion midway through the first half. Winning the ball on the halfway line, winger Bleazard drove in from the left, before unleashing a superb 25-yard drive into the top corner to give the Blues the advantage. Stand-in skipper Susi almost doubled the Blues' advantage after racing clear to meet Dani Buet's through-ball, forcing Emma Byrne into a low save, and Chelsea also secure their place in the final for the first time in the FA Women's Cup history.

== Pre-match ==
The event represented a first final appearance for either club, as well as the first time the match had been held in Bristol.

== Match ==
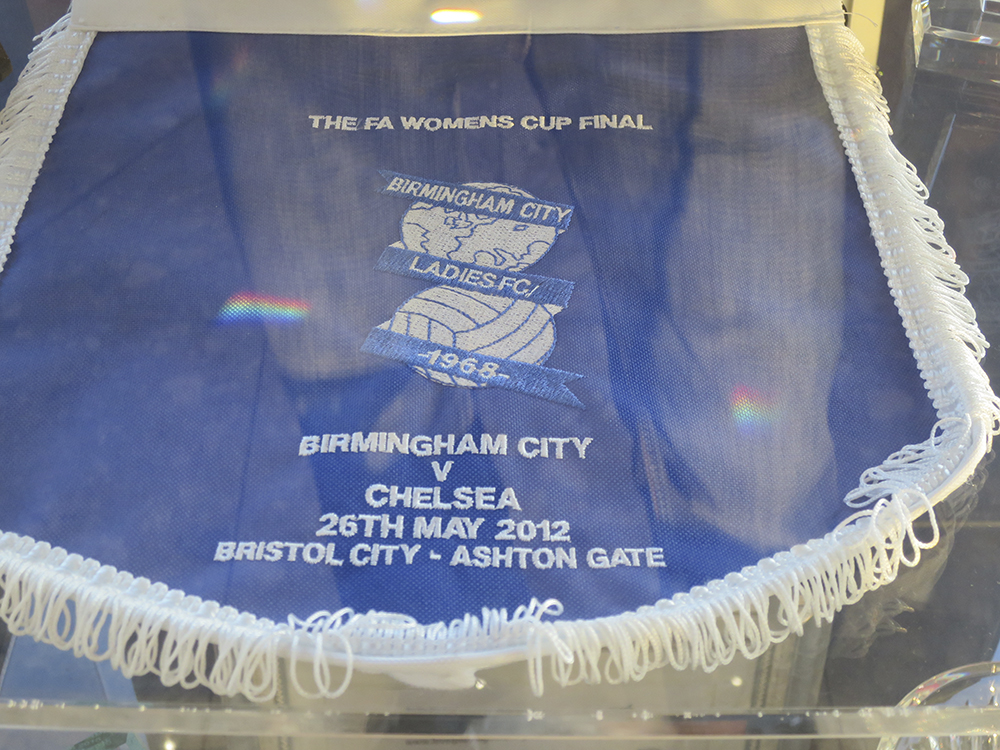

=== Summary ===
Helen Lander put Chelsea ahead in the 70th minute courtesy of a neat turn and finish and it looked for a long time that this solitary goal would be enough for glory, but Rachel Williams equalised in the 91st minute after Chelsea failed to clear a Karen Carney corner. The Londoners retook the lead in the first half of extra time through substitute Kate Longhurst, but the Blues bounced back once more when Carney converted a centrally-placed free-kick on the edge of the box. This goal forced the penalty shoot-out which they would eventually triumph in. Williams saw her kick saved by Carly Telford but Rachel Unitt, Jodie Taylor and Karen Carney all converted for the Midlanders. Chelsea's Drew Spence saw her penalty saved by Rebecca Spencer, Claire Rafferty hooked her penalty wide and Gemma Bonner blazed hers over the bar to hand The Cup to Birmingham.

=== Details ===
26 May 2012
12:15 BST

Birmingham City	2–2 (a.e.t.)	Chelsea
Williams 90+1'; Carney 112'	Report	Lander 70'; Longhurst 101'
Penalties
Williams (penalty missed); Unitt (penalty scored); Taylor (penalty scored); Carney (penalty scored)	3–2	(penalty scored) Sherwood; (penalty missed) Spence; (penalty missed) Rafferty; (penalty scored) Buet; (penalty missed) Bonner

Ashton Gate, Bristol
Attendance: 8,723
Referee: Natalie Walker (Lancashire)

Birmingham City	Chelsea

GK	22	(Jamaica) Rebecca Spencer
RB	2	(England) Chelsea Weston
CB	19	(England) Emily Westwood
CB	6	(England) Laura Bassett (c)
LB	17	(England) Rachel Unitt
RM	10	(England) Karen Carney
CM	14	(England) Jade Moore
CM	11	(England) Jo Potter
LM	3	(England) Kerys Harrop	(substituted off) 63'
AM	8	(England) Rachel Williams
CF	14	(England) Jodie Taylor
Substitutes:
GK	1	(England) Marie Hourihan
MF	7	(England) Isobel Christiansen
FW	9	(England) Eniola Aluko	(substituted on) 63'
FW	20	(England) Marie Ballard
FW	21	(Spain) Cristina Torkildsen
Manager:
(England) David Parker

GK	1	(England) Carly Telford (c)
RB	2	(England) Lara Fay	(substituted off) 70'
CB	5	(England) Gemma Bonner
CB	16	(Wales) Sophie Ingle
LB	11	(England) Claire Rafferty
RM	19	(England) Laura Coombs	(substituted off) 57'
CM	6	(Wales) Katie Sherwood
LM	8	(England) Danielle Buet
RW	17	(England) Dunia Susi
LW	15	(Wales) Helen Bleazard
CF	10	(Wales) Helen Lander	(substituted off) 76'
Substitutes:
GK	18	(England) Sarah Quantrill
DF	3	(Republic of Ireland) Sophie Perry	(substituted on) 70'
MF	4	(England) Drew Spence	(substituted on) 57'
FW	7	(England) Ashlee Hincks
FW	20	(England) Kate Longhurst	(substituted on) 76'
Manager:
(England) Matt Beard

Player of the match
Karen Carney (Birmingham City)

Assistant referees:
Helen Conley
Sian Piret
Fourth official:
Amy Fearn (Derbyshire)

Match rules

- 90 minutes.
- 30 minutes of extra-time if necessary.
- Penalty shoot-out if scores still level.
- Five named substitutes.
- Maximum of three substitutions.
