= Sophie Ingle =

Welsh footballer (born 1991)

Sophie Ingle OBE
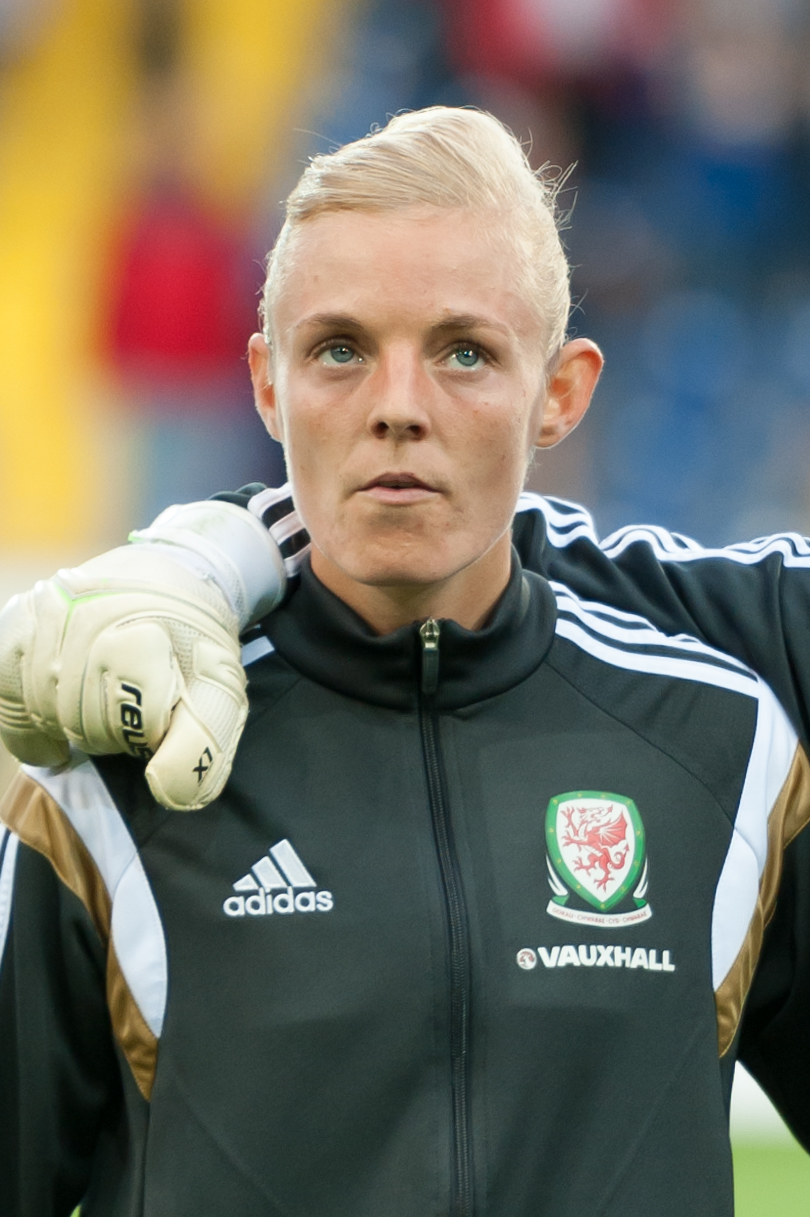
- Ingle with the Wales women's national football team in September 2015

Personal information
- Full name: Sophie Louise Ingle
- Date of birth: 2 September 1991 (age 35)
- Place of birth: Llandough, Penarth, Wales
- Height: 1.73 m (5 ft 8 in)
- Positions: Defender; defensive midfielder

Team information
- Current team: Bristol City

Youth career
- Vale Wanderers
- Dinas Powys Ladies

Senior career*
Years	Team	Apps	(Gls)
2007–2012	Cardiff City		
2012–2013	Chelsea	22	(0)
2014–2015	Bristol Academy	27	(2)
2015–2018	Liverpool	42	(0)
2018–2025	Chelsea	101	(6)
2025-	Bristol City	0	(0)

International career^{‡}
2008	Wales U17		
2009	Wales U19		
2009–	Wales	154	(9)
2021–	Great Britain	4	(0)
- * Club domestic league appearances and goals as of 18 May 2024 ‡ National team caps and goals as of 18 October 2026

Sophie Louise Ingle OBE (born 2 September 1991) is a Welsh footballer who plays for Women's Super League 2 club Bristol City and is a former captain of the Wales national team. She has previously represented Bristol Academy, Cardiff City, Liverpool and Chelsea. Ingle plays as either a defender or defensive midfielder.

In 2020, her Chelsea goal against Arsenal was nominated for the FIFA Puskas Award.

== Early life ==
Sophie grew up in Barry, Vale of Glamorgan and attended Holton Primary School before attending St Richard Gwyn Catholic High School, Barry.

== Club career ==
Ingle began her football career with boys' team Vale Wanderers. Despite making an appeal to the Football Association of Wales (FAW), rules prevented Ingle from playing with the boys beyond the age of 12. She spent a year away from football and then had brief spells with Vale Wanderers' girls and Dinas Powys Ladies. This preceded the teenage Ingle's move to Cardiff City Ladies.

=== Cardiff City, 2007–12 ===
After a period in the reserves, Ingle broke into Cardiff's FA Women's Premier League team during season 2007–08.

=== Chelsea, 2012–13 ===
After winning the Welsh Cup twice with Cardiff, Ingle signed for WSL outfit Chelsea Ladies ahead of the 2012 campaign. On 11 March 2012, she made her Chelsea debut against Brighton in a FA Cup match, helping Chelsea to a 3–0 win.

Chelsea manager Matt Beard deployed Ingle as a central defender and praised her impact after Chelsea's 2012 FA Women's Cup Final defeat to Birmingham: "Sophie Ingle, we initially brought in as a left back but you can see from her quality on the ball and distribution and reading of the game is good as well, she has created a few goals for us with balls in behind which something we haven’t had before."

=== Bristol Academy, 2014–15 ===
In February 2014, Ingle left Chelsea and moved nearer to home by joining Bristol Academy. She rose to captain The Vixens, but the club were relegated after the 2015 season. Ingle became a transfer target for other clubs and decided to join Liverpool in December 2015: "Liverpool is a massive club and once I was aware of their interest there was only one team I wanted to sign for".

=== Return to Chelsea, 2018–25 ===
In June 2018, Ingle returned to Chelsea after 5 years, signing a two-years deal with the Blues.

In November 2023 she became the WSL record appearance holder, with 184 appearances.

During a pre-season friendly against Feyenoord on 7 September 2024, Ingle suffered an anterior cruciate ligament injury and missed the entire 2024–25 season as a result. On 9 May 2025, it was announced that Ingle would leave Chelsea upon the expiry of her contract at the end of the season, having made 214 appearances for the club.

=== Second stint at Bristol ===
On 8 August 2025, it was announced that Ingle had signed with WSL 2 side Bristol City (formerly known as Bristol Academy), 10 years after her first time with the club. Having had a red card which she had been shown in the previous match overturned by an FA-appointed independent Regulatory Commission, she scored her first goal of her second stint with Bristol in a 2–1 win over Durham WFC on 5 October 2025.

In August 2026, Ingle signed a new contract with Bristol, continuing her tenure at the club until summer 2028.

== International career ==
Ingle was called-up to represent Wales at Under-17 level, and later rose to captain the Under-19 squad. Ingle won her first senior cap for Wales in a 2–1 World Cup qualifying defeat to Azerbaijan, played in Baku on 28 October 2009.

In December 2011, Ingle was named in the preliminary Team GB squad for the 2012 Olympics. She won her 50th cap for Wales in July 2014, during a 1–1 friendly draw with Scotland in Dumfries.

Wales manager Jayne Ludlow named Ingle the new national team captain ahead of the 2015 Istria Cup, replacing Jess Fishlock who was surprisingly dropped from the squad.

On 22 September 2020, Ingle played her 100th match for Wales against Norway during the UEFA Women's Euro 2021 qualifiers. On 27 May 2021 it was announced that Ingle had been selected as the only Welsh player in the Great Britain women's Olympic football team for the 2020 Olympics.

In April 2024, Ingle stood down as Wales captain after nine years in the role.

Sophie suffered an ACL injury in September 2024 and missed the UEFA Women's Euro play off qualifiers as well as being unable to play at club level. Despite this, Ingle was named in Wales' squad for UEFA Women's Euro 2025. She made her return from injury on 9 July 2025, being substituted on to replace Jess Fishlock in a 4–1 loss against France. Regarding her comeback from injury, Ingle said that "throughout my whole rehab, it was just focusing on getting back for the Euros and that was the main aim".

Ingle made her 150th senior appearance for Wales, the second player to reach the milestone for Wales, on 18 April 2026, featuring in a 1–0 win over Albania in the Wales' 2027 World Cup qualifying campaign.

== Personal life ==
Ingle is openly lesbian.

== Career statistics ==
As of 14 November 2024

Club	Season	League			National cup (Note: Includes Women's FA Cup)		League cup (Note: Includes FA Women's League Cup)		Continental (Note: Includes UEFA Women's Champions League)		Total	
Club	Season	Division	Apps	Goals	Apps	Goals	Apps	Goals	Apps	Goals	Apps	Goals
Gwalia United F.C.	2007-08	Adran Premier	?		?		?		—		?	
Gwalia United F.C.	2008-09	Adran Premier	?		?		?		—		?	
Gwalia United F.C.	2009-10	Adran Premier	?		?		?		—		?	
Gwalia United F.C.	2010-11	Adran Premier	?		?		?		—		?	
Gwalia United F.C.	2011-12	Adran Premier	?		?		?		—		?	
Gwalia United F.C.	Total		?	?	?	?	?	?	?	?	?	?
Chelsea F.C.	2012	Women's Super League	13	0	?	?	1	0	—		14	0
Chelsea F.C.	2013	Women's Super League	9	0	?	?	3	0	—		12	0
Chelsea F.C.	Total		22	0	?	?	3	-	?	?	26	0
Bristol Academy FC	2014	Women's Super League	13	1	?		5	0	-		18	1
Bristol Academy FC	2015	Women's Super League	14	1	?		5	0	6	0	25	1
Bristol Academy FC	Total		27	2	?	?	10	0	6	0	43	2
Liverpool F.C.	2016	Women's Super League	16	0	?		—		—		16	0
Liverpool F.C.	2017	Women's Super League	8	0	?		2	0	—		10	0
Liverpool F.C.	2017-18	Women's Super League	18	0	?		5	0	—		23	0
Liverpool F.C.	Total		42	0	?	?	7	0	?	?	49	0
Chelsea F.C.	2018-19	Women's Super League	14	0	?	?	5	0	8	0	27	0
Chelsea F.C.	2019-20	Women's Super League	15	4	?	?	4	0	-	-	19	4
Chelsea F.C.	2020-21	Women's Super League	18	0	1	0	5	2	5	0	29	2
Chelsea F.C.	2021-22	Women's Super League	19	0	5	0	3	0	5	0	32	0
Chelsea F.C.	2022-23	Women's Super League	21	2	5	1	3	0	9	2	33	5
Chelsea F.C.	2023-24	Women's Super League	14	0	2	0	2	0	6	1	24	1
Chelsea F.C.	2024-25	Women's Super League	0	0	0	0	0	0	0	0	0	0
Chelsea F.C.	Total		101	6	13	1	22	2	33	3	164	12
Career total			192	18	16	1	41	3	39	3	288	14

=== International ===
Statistics accurate as of matches played 13 October 2026, from the Football Association of Wales.

Year	Wales		Great Britain	
Year	Apps	Goals	Apps	Goals
Prior to 2015	52	2	0	0
2015	8	0	—N/a	
2016	8	0	—N/a	
2017	12	0	—N/a	
2018	10	0	—N/a	
2019	8	0	—N/a	
2020	5	0	—N/a	
2021	9	2	4	0
2022	14	1	-	
2023	7	0	-	
2024	7	1	-	
2025	5	2	-	
2026	7	1	-	
Total	154	9	4	0

== International goals ==
No.	date	Venue	Opponent	Score	Result	Competition
1.	21 August 2010	Latham Park, Newtown, Wales	Azerbaijan	10–0	15–0	2011 FIFA Women's World Cup qualification
2.	20 November 2011	Ness Ziona Stadium, Ness Ziona, Israel	Israel	2–0	2–0	UEFA Women's Euro 2013 qualifying
3.	26 October 2021	Cardiff City Stadium, Cardiff, Wales	Estonia	4–0	4–0	2023 FIFA Women's World Cup qualification
4.	26 November 2021	Parc y Scarlets, Llanelli, Wales	Greece	1–0	5–0	2023 FIFA Women's World Cup qualification
5.	8 April 2022	Parc y Scarlets, Llanelli, Wales	France	1–2	1–2	2023 FIFA Women's World Cup qualification
6.	12 July 2024	Stadion Branko Čavlović-Čavlek, Karlovac, Croatia	Croatia	2–0	3–0	UEFA Women's Euro 2025 qualifying
7.	28 November 2025	Ciudad Deportiva Fundación, Málaga, Spain	South Korea	1–0	1–1	Friendly
8.	2 December 2025	Estadio Municipal de Chapín, Jerez de la Frontera, Spain	Switzerland	1–0	3–2	Friendly
9.	7 March 2026	Parc y Scarlets, Llanelli, Wales	Montenegro	4–0	6–1	2027 FIFA Women's World Cup qualification

== Honours ==
Ingle was appointed Officer of the Order of the British Empire (OBE) in the 2023 New Year Honours for services to association football.

=== Club ===
==== Chelsea ====
External videos
- Ingle's FIFA Puskas Award Nominated Goal retrieved 20 January 2021

- FA Women's Super League: 2019–20, 2020–21, 2021–22, 2022–23, 2023–24
- Women's FA Cup: 2020–21, 2021–22, 2022–23
- FA Women's League Cup: 2019–20
- FA Community Shield: 2020

=== Individual ===
- Liverpool Women's Players' Player of the Season: 2017, 2018
- FIFA Puskas Award Nominee: 2020
