= Peter King (footballer, born 1964) =

English footballer (1964–2012)

Personal information
- Date of birth: 5 July 1964
- Place of birth: Liverpool, England
- Date of death: 23 December 2012 (aged 48)
- Position: Midfielder

Youth career
- Liverpool

Senior career*
| Years | Team | Apps | (Gls) |
| 1983–1985 | Crewe Alexandra | 64 | (5) |
| 1985–1987 | Southport | 129 | (10) |
| 1987– | Morecambe | | |
- * Club domestic league appearances and goals

Peter King (5 July 1964 – 23 December 2012) was an English footballer who played as a midfielder for Crewe Alexandra in the Football League.

== Career ==
King was a youth player at Liverpool, but left Anfield when he signed for Fourth Division club Crewe Alexandra in the summer of 1983; he was actually not signed by new manager Dario Gradi, as the Alex board acted on the recommendation of Liverpool and former Alex secretary Peter Robinson. He went on to make 64 appearances for the "Railwaymen" during the 1983–84 and 1984–85 campaigns, scoring five goals. He later played non-league football for Southport in the Northern Premier League in 1985–86 and 1986–87, before joining league rivals Morecambe. King played mainly as a defensive midfielder, but could also perform at left or right full back. He was also a very good penalty taker.
