= Rachel Williams (footballer) =

English footballer

- Williams with Manchester United in 2025

Personal information
- Full name: Rachel Louise Williams
- Date of birth: 10 January 1988 (age 38)
- Place of birth: Leicester, England
- Height: 1.69 m (5 ft 7 in)
- Positions: Midfielder; forward

Team information
- Current team: Burnley
- Number: 18

Youth career
- Linden Old Girls
- Leicester City

Senior career*
Years	Team	Apps	(Gls)
2004–2008	Leicester City		
2008–2010	Doncaster Rovers Belles		
2010	Leicester City		
2011–2013	Birmingham City	35	(21)
2014	Chelsea	8	(2)
2015–2017	Notts County Ladies	28	(9)
2017–2020	Birmingham City	30	(5)
2020–2022	Tottenham Hotspur	34	(4)
2022–2026	Manchester United	59	(9)
2026	Leicester City	9	(0)
2026–	Burnley	0	(0)

International career^{‡}
2010–2011	England U23		
2009–2017	England	15	(4)
2012	Great Britain	1	(0)
- * Club domestic league appearances and goals as of 14:47, 7 August 2026 (UTC) ‡ National team caps and goals as of 7 March 2017

Rachel Louise Williams (born 10 January 1988) is an English professional footballer who plays as a forward for Women's Super League 2 club Burnley.

Before rejoining Birmingham City in May 2017, Williams spent 2 years at Notts County Ladies, one year at Chelsea Ladies and three years at her first spell at Birmingham City, where she was converted from an attacking midfielder to a striker. Williams made her senior England debut in July 2009 but had to wait two years for her next appearance, missing out on selection for Women's Euro 2009 and the 2011 Women's World Cup. She was selected in the Great Britain squad for the 2012 London Olympics.

== Club career ==
Williams joined Leicester City Women as a twelve-year-old, progressing through their centre of excellence to play in their senior side. She was vice–captain as the side won the County League in 2005. and the following season was a member of the side that again won the County League, but also the County Cup. In the 2006–07 season, Williams was a member of the Leicester side that won the treble of the East Midlands Women's Premier League title, the County Cup and the League Cup and promotion to the Midlands Combination League. The following season she was part of the Leicester team that won promotion to the FA Women's Premier League Northern Division.

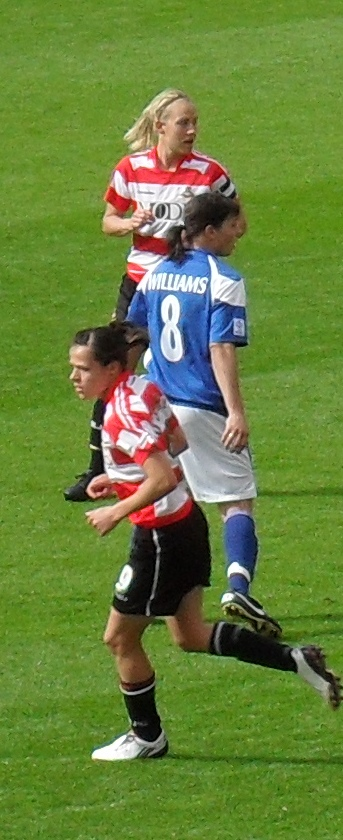
Williams (centre) at Doncaster in August 2011

She left Leicester at the end of the 2007–08 season to join Doncaster Rovers Belles. She was the FA Premier League player of the month for October 2008, and was a member of the Doncaster side that lost to Arsenal Ladies in the 2009 FA Women's Premier League Cup final. She ended her first season with Doncaster as the club's Player of the Year and the Players' Player of the Year.

Williams netted on the opening day of the 2009–10 season as Doncaster drew 1–1 at home to Blackburn Rovers Ladies. In October 2009 she scored against former club Leicester City Women as Doncaster progressed in the Premier League Cup.

With Doncaster not playing until the FA WSL in March 2011, Williams re–signed for Leicester City in summer 2010. In December 2010, Williams was revealed to have signed for Birmingham City's FA WSL squad. After converting to a striker, Williams made an impressive start to the new season with Birmingham, scoring five goals in her first two WSL appearances and winning a recall to the England squad.

Williams hit 14 goals in 14 games as Birmingham missed out on the WSL title on the final day. She was also voted 2011 Players' Player of the Year at The FA Women's Football Awards. She scored an injury time equaliser against Chelsea Ladies in the 2012 FA Women's Cup Final, which Birmingham eventually won after a penalty shootout.

In October 2013 Birmingham announced that Williams had departed the club "by mutual consent". A transfer to Chelsea was made public on 6 November 2013. She scored seven goals in 13 games across all competitions for Chelsea, who finished second in the 2014 FA WSL. In January 2015 she transferred to Notts County Ladies in her native Midlands. Following the closure of Notts County Ladies before the 2017 Spring Series, Williams re-signed to Birmingham City in May 2017.

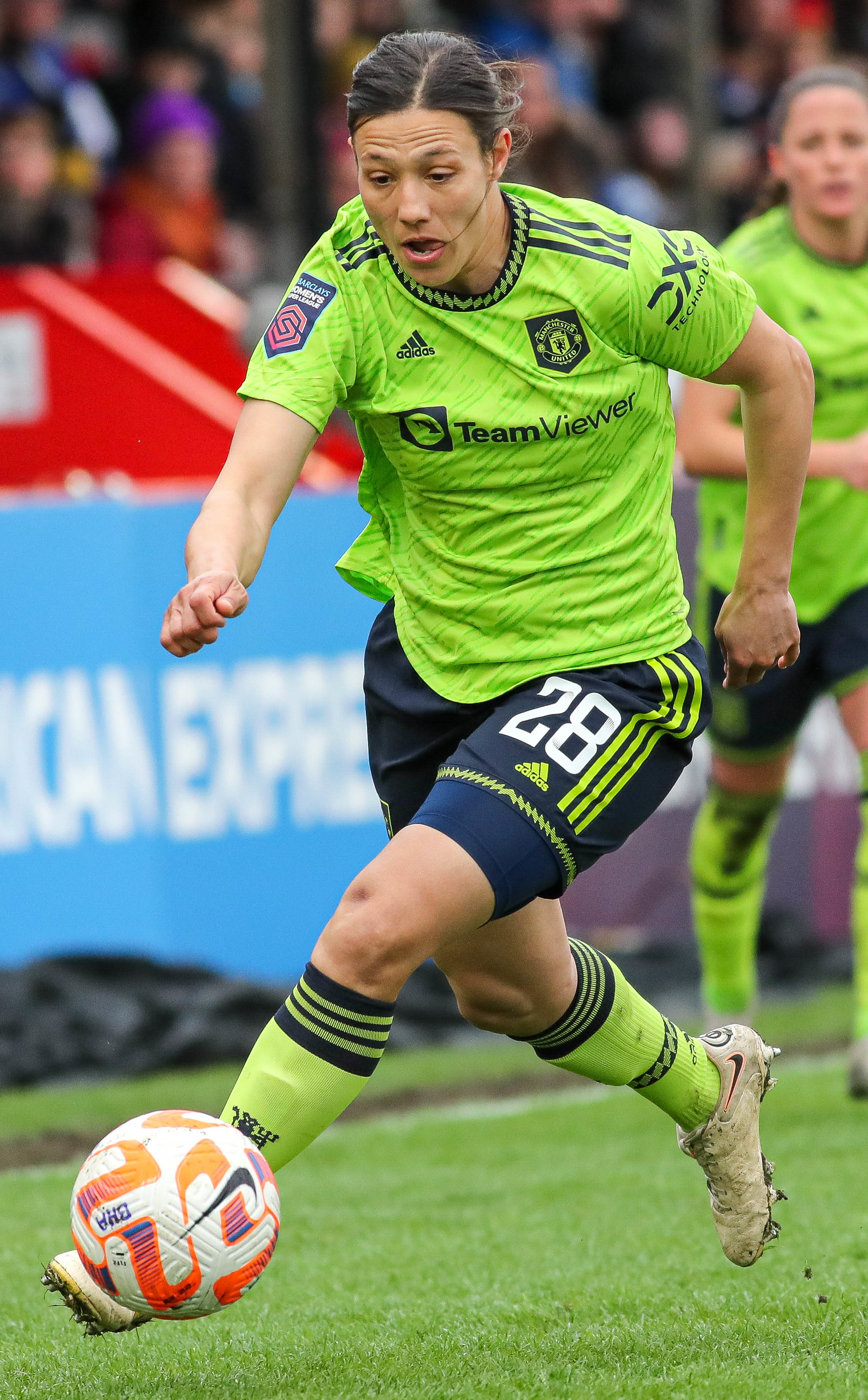
Williams with Manchester United in 2023

In July 2022, Williams signed a two-year contract with Manchester United, reuniting with her former Birmingham manager Marc Skinner. She scored 21 goals in 90 appearances for the club, including one in the 2024 Women's FA Cup final as United lifted its first major silverware.

Williams returned to Leicester City for a third time in January 2026, signing an 18-month contract.

Williams joined Burnley in August 2026, signing a one year contract.

== International career ==
=== England ===
Williams scored on her England Under-19 debut, whilst still an Under-17 player, against Switzerland in 2005. Later that year she was selected as part of the England squad for the UEFA Women's Under-19 Championship.

In May 2009, Williams was one of the first 17 female players to be given central contracts by the Football Association. At the time she was the only uncapped player to be awarded a contract. Her debut for the England senior side came in July 2009 when she came on as a substitute for Alex Scott in the 2–0 defeat at home to Iceland. She missed out on a place in the Women's Euro 2009 Squad, but was picked by head coach Hope Powell for England's squad to face Malta in the first qualifying game for the 2011 Women's World Cup. Despite excellent form at club level, Williams was overlooked for the 2011 World Cup squad.

Williams collected her second cap, more than two years after her first, when she replaced Natasha Dowie during half–time of a 2–2 Euro 2013 qualifying draw in Serbia. She scored her first international goal in the next qualifier against Slovenia, a 4–0 win at Swindon's County Ground in September 2011. In June 2013 Williams was left out of Powell's squad for UEFA Women's Euro 2013.

Williams was allotted 171 when the FA announced their legacy numbers scheme to honour the 50th anniversary of England's inaugural international.

==== International goals ====
Scores and results list England's goal tally first.

#	Date	Venue	Opponent	Result	Competition	Scored
1	22 September 2011	County Ground (Swindon)	Slovenia	4–0	2013 UEFA Women's Championship Qual.	1
2	31 March 2012	Sajmište, Vrbovec	Croatia	6–0	2013 UEFA Championship Qual.	1
3	21 June 2012	Ob Jezeru, Velenje	Slovenia	4–0	UEFA Euro 2013 Qual.	1
4	8 March 2013	GSZ Stadium, Larnaca, Cyprus	Scotland	4–4	2013 Cyprus Cup	1

=== Great Britain Olympic ===
In June 2012 Williams was named in the 18–player Great Britain squad for the 2012 London Olympics.

== Personal life ==
Williams used to work as a plasterer before football became fully professional.

== Career statistics ==
=== Club ===
As of match played 10 December 2025.

Appearances and goals by club, season and competition
Club	Season	League			National Cup (Note: Includes the Women's FA Cup)		League Cup (Note: Includes the WSL Cup/Women's League Cup & Women's National League Cup)		Europe (Note: Includes the UEFA Women's Champions League)		Total	
Club	Season	Division	Apps	Goals	Apps	Goals	Apps	Goals	Apps	Goals	Apps	Goals
Leicester City	2004–2005	Leicestershire County Leagues	?	?	?	?	?	?	—		?	?
Leicester City	2005–06	Leicestershire County Leagues	?	?	?	?	?	?	—		?	?
Leicester City	2006–07	East Midlands Premier League	?	?	?	?	?	?	—		?	?
Leicester City	2007–08	Midland Combination	?	?	?	?	?	?	—		?	?
Leicester City	Total		?	?	?	?	?	?	—		?	?
Doncaster Rovers Belles	2008–09	WPL	16	4	?	?	4	4	—		20	8
Doncaster Rovers Belles	2009–10	WPL	21	6	1	0	2	1	—		24	7
Doncaster Rovers Belles	Total		37	10	1	0	6	5	—		44	15
Leicester City	2010–11	WPL Northern Division	3	0	—		0	0	—		3	0
Birmingham City	2011	WSL	14	14	?	?	0	0	—		14	14
Birmingham City	2012	WSL	12	6	3	3	5	0	2	1	22	10
Birmingham City	2013	WSL	9	1	1	0	3	3	—		13	4
Birmingham City	Total		35	21	4	3	8	3	2	1	49	28
Chelsea	2014	WSL	8	2	2	1	2	3	—		12	6
Notts County	2015	WSL	14	6	3	0	8	4	—		25	10
Notts County	2016	WSL	14	3	2	2	2	0	—		18	5
Notts County	Total		28	9	5	2	10	4	—		43	15
Birmingham City	2017	WSL	5	2	0	0	0	0	—		5	2
Birmingham City	2017–18	WSL	15	3	2	0	4	0	—		21	3
Birmingham City	2018–19	WSL	0	0	0	0	0	0	—		0	0
Birmingham City	2019–20	WSL	10	0	1	0	4	4	—		15	4
Birmingham City	Total		30	5	3	0	8	4	—		41	9
Tottenham Hotspur	2020–21	WSL	12	0	3	2	0	0	—		15	0
Tottenham Hotspur	2021–22	WSL	22	4	1	0	3	2	—		26	6
Tottenham Hotspur	Total		34	4	4	2	3	2	—		41	6
Manchester United	2022–23	WSL	17	4	5	1	3	1	—		25	6
Manchester United	2023–24	WSL	21	5	5	5	4	1	1	0	31	11
Manchester United	2024–25	WSL	15	0	4	2	4	2	—		23	4
Manchester United	2025–26	WSL	6	0	0	0	0	0	5	0	11	0
Manchester United	Total		59	9	14	8	11	4	6	0	90	21
Leicester City	2025–26	WSL	0	0	0	0	0	0	—		0	0
Career total			234	62	33	16	48	25	8	1	323	100

=== International ===
Statistics accurate as of match played 7 March 2017.

Year	England		Great Britain	
Year	Apps	Goals	Apps	Goals
2009	1	0	-	
2010	0	0	-	
2011	3	1	-	
2012	3	2	1	0
2013	4	1	-	
2014	0	0	-	
2015	0	0	-	
2016	0	0	-	
2017	2	0	-	
Total	13	4	1	0

== Honours ==
Leicester City

- Midland Combination Women's Football League: 2007–08
- Unison East Midlands Women's Premier League: 2006–07
- Unison East Midlands Premier League Cup: 2006–07
- Unison East Midlands Southern League Cup: 2005–06
- Leicestershire & Rutland County FA Cup: 2005–06, 2006–07, 2007–08
- Leicestershire County League: 2004–05

Birmingham City

- Women's FA Cup: 2011–12

Manchester United

- Women's FA Cup: 2023–24; runner-up: 2022–23, 2024–25

Individual

- WSL Goal of the Month: January 2023
- FA Women's Players' Player of the Year: 2010–11
- Women's Super League Golden Boot: 2010–11
- FA WSL All Star Team: 2010–11
- Doncaster Player of the Year: 2008–09
- Doncaster Players' Player of the Year: 2008–09
