= Helen Bleazard =

Welsh footballer (born 1990)

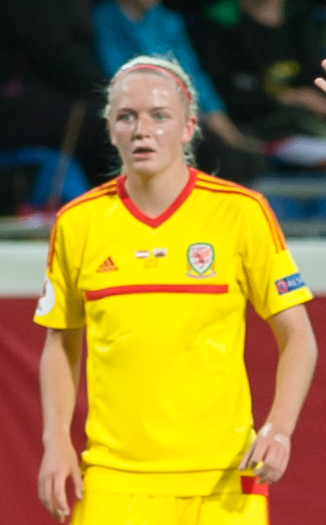
- Helen Bleazard playing for Wales in September 2015

Personal information
- Full name: Helen Bleazard
- Date of birth: 14 August 1990 (age 36)
- Place of birth: Yeovil, England
- Position: Midfielder

Youth career
- 1999–2004: Yeovil Town

Senior career*
Years	Team	Apps	(Gls)
2004–2005	Yeovil Town		
2005–2007	Bristol City		
2007–2008	Bristol Academy		
2008–2010	Keynsham Town		
2010	Yeovil Town	6	(0)
2011	Bristol Academy	23	(9)
2012–2013	Chelsea	33	(8)
2013–2017	Yeovil Town	75	(13)
2018–2022	Plymouth Argyle	44	(20)
2022–2025	AFC Bournemouth	?	(?)

International career
2011–2015	Wales	43	(1)
- * Club domestic league appearances and goals as of 16:45, 28 Apr 2020 (UTC)

Helen Bleazard (born 14 August 1990) is a former English–born footballer who played for the Welsh national team and Yeovil Town. She previously played in the FA WSL for Bristol Academy and Chelsea Ladies. Bleazard usually plays as a wide midfielder or forward and switched allegiance to Wales after playing for England at youth level.

Bleazard was appointed manager of the AFC Bournemouth women's team in September 2025 following her retirement after 3 seasons with said squad, the retirement of long-term manager Steve Cuss and a short stint as interim manager. The team had been promoted to FA Women's National League Southern Premier, the 3rd tier of English soccer, for the first time.

== Club career ==
After joining local side Yeovil Town at the age of nine, Bleazard eventually moved on to FA Women's Premier League club Bristol City at the end of season 2004–05.

Bleazard signed a contract with FA WSL club Bristol Academy in February 2011. She helped the club qualify for the UEFA Women's Champions League for the first time, by scoring in a 3–0 FA Women's Cup semi–final win over Liverpool at Haig Avenue. At the FA Women's Cup final at the Ricoh Arena in May 2011 Bleazard struck the crossbar with a free kick, but Bristol were beaten 2–0 by Arsenal.

In February 2012 Bleazard signed for Bristol's WSL rivals Chelsea. She played for her new club in the 2012 FA Women's Cup Final, but they lost to Birmingham City on penalties after a 2–2 draw. After two seasons with Chelsea, Bleazard agreed a deal to return to Yeovil, whose application to the new second level of an enlarged WSL has been successful. Yeovil's chairman was enthused by the transfer, describing Bleazard as: "the best female player the town of Yeovil has ever produced."

== International career ==
Bleazard represented England at Under–17 level, and was called into the Under–20 squad during the 2008–09 season. She was also selected for the England college team while attending Yeovil College.

Bleazard later switched her footballing allegiance to Wales and was named on the standby list for their March 2011 Algarve Cup campaign. Bristol Academy teammates Jessica Fishlock and Alex Culvin joked that Bleazard's eligibility for the Welsh national team arose from "her Nan's Sister's Brother's Aunty."

Bleazard won her first senior cap for Wales playing on the left–wing in a 2–0 friendly defeat to New Zealand, played in Savièse on 15 June 2011.
