= Wheatsheaf Park (football stadium) =

Football stadium located in Staines-Upon-Thames

- Interactive map of Wheatsheaf Park
- Location: Staines-upon-Thames
- Coordinates: 51°25′11.0202″N 0°30′7.4412″W
- Capacity: 3,002
- Surface: Grass
- Field size: 103 by 68 metres (113 by 74 yards)

Construction
- Opened: 1951
- Renovated: 2000–2003, 2023
- Cost: £6,500,000

Tenants
- Staines Town (1951–2022); Chelsea Ladies (2012–2017); Brentford B (2023–present)

Wheatsheaf Park is a football stadium in Staines-upon-Thames, England. It was the home ground of Staines Town between its opening in 1951 and the club's disbandment in 2022. The stadium was renovated in March 2000, with Staines Town moving back in upon its completion in February 2003.

Like many football stadiums, it has changed greatly over time; the most recent of these changes was the development of the main stand in the Wheatsheaf Lane End. Planning permission for this was granted by Spelthorne Council in March 2000, and Staines Town returned to the revamped ground on 22 February 2003.

Wheatsheaf Park has a total capacity of 3,002. The record league attendance for a match at Wheatsheaf Park was 2,285 against AFC Wimbledon in 2006. However, one year later Staines had an FA Cup match against Stockport County and the attendance just crept over the 2,860 mark, setting the club's overall attendance record.

Wheatsheaf Park was also the home stadium of Chelsea Ladies between 2012 and 2017. In 2015 the ground received its UEFA Stadium Category 1 approval and hosted Chelsea's home fixtures in the 2015–16 UEFA Women's Champions League against Glasgow City and VfL Wolfsburg.

In late 2023, Brentford announced that their reserves and under-18s would play their home games at the stadium, with the possibility of their women's team following suit.
