= Kate Longhurst =

English footballer (born 1989)

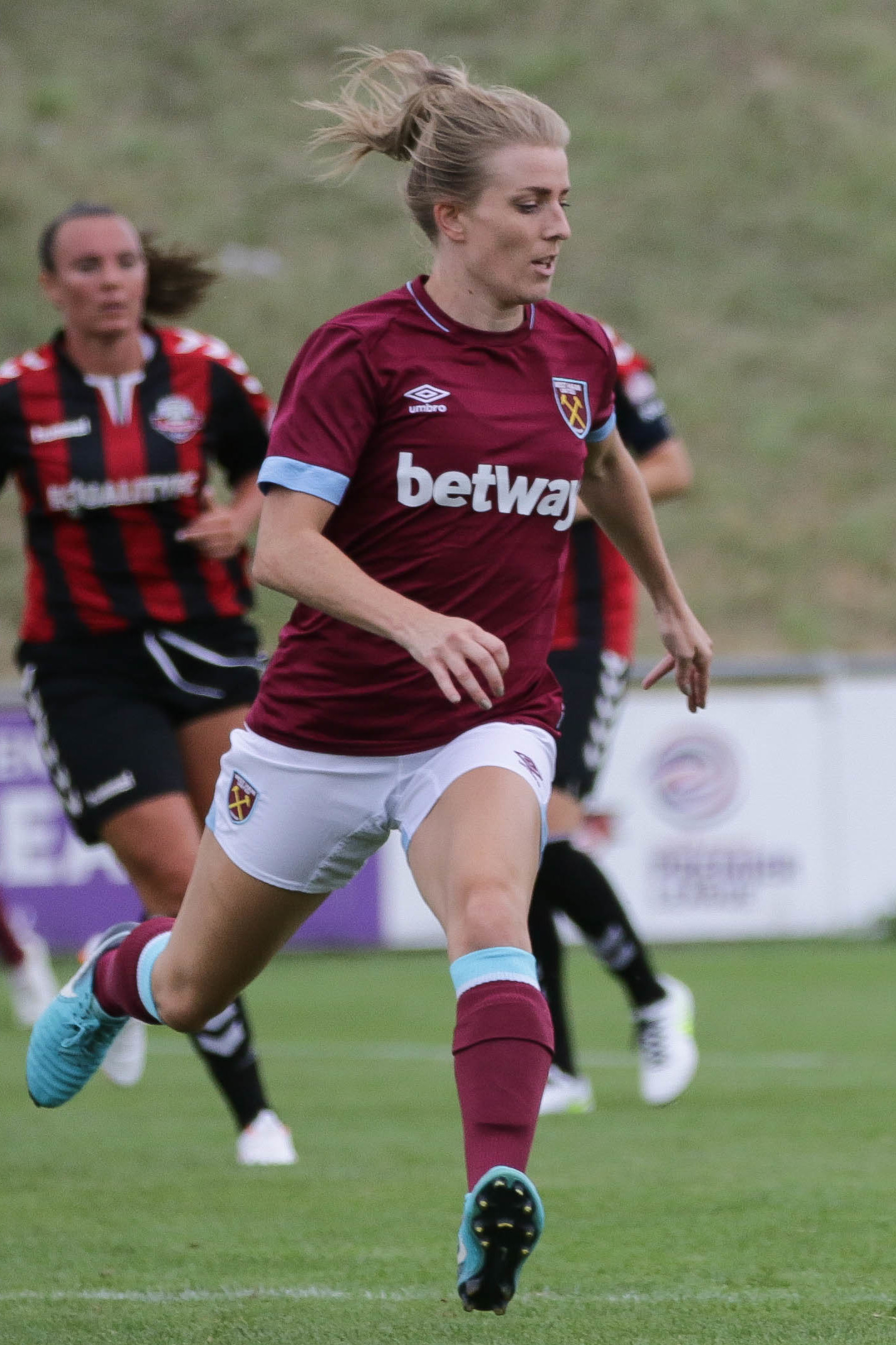
- Longhurst with West Ham in 2018

Personal information
- Full name: Kate Leanne Longhurst
- Date of birth: 2 May 1989 (age 37)
- Place of birth: Chelmsford, England
- Height: 1.68 m (5 ft 6 in)
- Positions: Midfielder; wing-back

Team information
- Current team: Retired

Youth career
- Colchester United

Senior career*
| Years | Team | Apps | (Gls) |
| 2005–2009 | Colchester United | 77 | (46) |
| 2009–2010 | Watford | 17 | (3) |
| 2010–2011 | Millwall Lionesses | 16 | (12) |
| 2011–2013 | Chelsea | 21 | (4) |
| 2013–2018 | Liverpool | 68 | (3) |
| 2018–2023 | West Ham United | 93 | (3) |
| 2023–2024 | Charlton Athletic | 20 | (2) |
| 2024–2025 | Nottingham Forest | 22 | (2) |
- * Club domestic league appearances and goals as of 22:01, 31st July 2025 playing positions aren't capitalised in prose(UTC)

Kate Leanne Longhurst (born 2 May 1989) is an English former footballer who played as a midfielder or wing-back. Longhurst won back to back WSL titles in her time at Liverpool WFC. She became the joint all-time Women's Super League record appearance maker in 2023 with 182 appearances.

== Club career ==
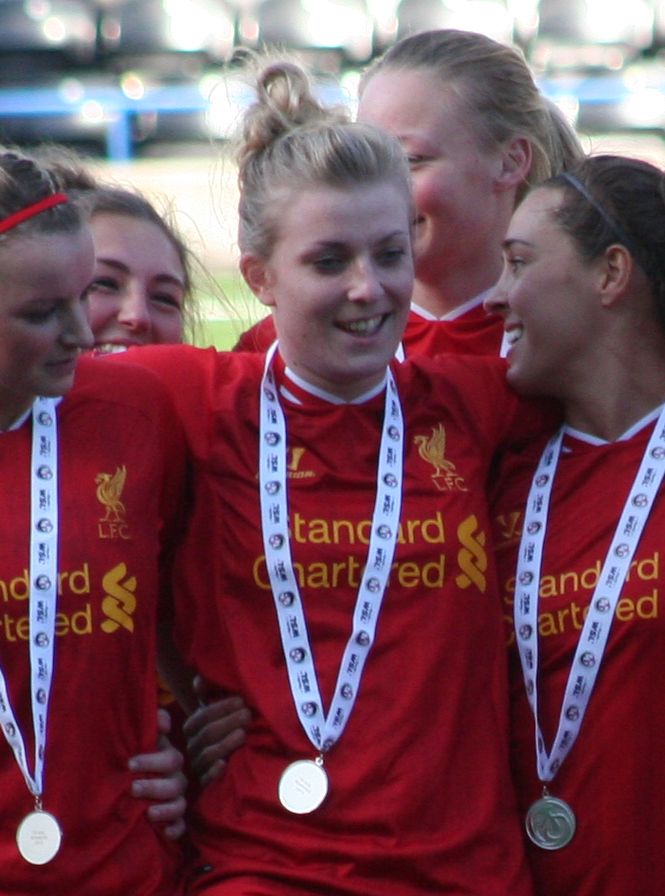
Longhurst with the Women's Super League winner's medal in 2014

Longhurst began her career with Colchester United. In the 2007–08 season, she scored 15 goals in 21 appearances. The following season, she scored 3 goals in 11 appearances. In 2009, she joined top-flight side Watford and finished the 2009–10 season with 3 goals in 17 matches. At the end of the season, she signed with Millwall Lionesses.

In 2011, Longhurst joined Chelsea. She scored the Blues' second goal in the 101st minute in the 2012 FA Women's Cup Final.

Longhurst signed with Liverpool in 2013, helping the side to back-to-back FA WSL titles in 2013 and 2014. On 22 May 2018, she left Liverpool following the expiration of her contract.

On 9 August 2018, Longhurst joined West Ham United. On 23 September, Longhurst scored West Ham's first ever FA WSL goal, in a 4–3 defeat to Arsenal.

Longhurst joined Charlton Athletic on 10 June 2023 before moving to Nottingham Forest on 22 July 2024.

Longhurst announced her retirement from playing professional football on 11 May 2025.

== International career ==
Longhurst represented England at various youth levels. In 2006, she partnered Ellen White in the Nationwide Under-17 Tournament final as she netted for England in a 2–0 win over Scotland.

== Honours ==
Liverpool

- FA WSL: 2013, 2014

Chelsea

- Women's FA Cup Runners-up 2012

West Ham United

- Women's FA Cup Runners-up 2019

Nottingham Forest

- FA Women’s Northern Premier Division winner
- FA Women’s National League Cup winner

Individual

- Liverpool Players player 2015
- Fans hammer of the year 2020 & 2022
- West Ham Players Player 2020 & 2022
