= Dunia Susi =

English footballer (born 1987)

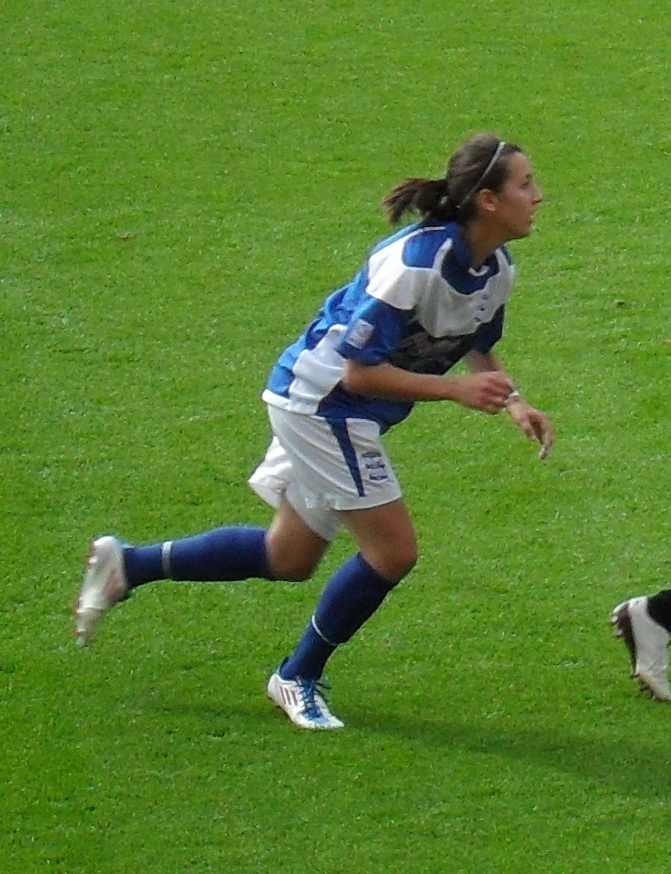

Personal information
- Date of birth: 10 August 1987 (age 39)
- Place of birth: Enfield, London, England
- Height: 5 ft 7 in (1.70 m)
- Positions: Defender; midfielder; forward

Youth career
- Enfield

Senior career*
Years	Team	Apps	(Gls)
2004–2005	Arsenal		
2005–2006	Fulham		
2006–2010	Chelsea		
2008	Richmond Kickers Destiny		
2011	Birmingham City	14	(2)
2012–2013	Chelsea	63	(34)
2014–2016	Notts County	42	(21)

International career^{‡}
2008	England U23		
2009–2013	England	21	(0)
- * Club domestic league appearances and goals as of 16:19, 30 January 2014 (UTC) ‡ National team caps and goals as of 16:19, 30 January 2014 (UTC)

Dunia Susi (born 10 August 1987) is an English international footballer. She played for a number of FA WSL clubs before retiring from football. She has also represented Great Britain at the Olympics 2012 and the World University Games.

== Club career ==
Susi started her footballing career at Enfield Ladies before moving to Arsenal Ladies and later played for Fulham Ladies before joining Chelsea Ladies in the 2006 close season.

She spent the 2008 United States season with Richmond Kickers Destiny, along with Chelsea colleagues Kylie Davies, Emma Delves and Jess O'Dwyer.

In December 2010, Susi was revealed to have signed for Birmingham City's FA WSL squad. She returned to Chelsea after one season away in February 2012. In January 2014 Susi joined Notts County.

== International career ==
=== England ===
Susi played for England at Under-19 and Under-23 level. Her debut for the England senior side came in July 2009 when she came on as a substitute for Corinne Yorston in the 2–0 defeat at home to Iceland. Susi's versatility has seen her selected as a right-back for England.

Susi has England legacy number 170. The FA announced their legacy numbers scheme to honour the 50th anniversary of England's inaugural international.

=== Great Britain Olympic ===
In June 2012 Susi was as one of four reserves to the 18–player Great Britain squad for the 2012 London Olympics. She was called into the squad as a replacement when Ifeoma Dieke suffered ruptured knee ligaments during Team GB's 3–0 win over Cameroon in the second group match of the games.

== Personal life ==
Susi started her footballing career captaining her schools boys' team. She then moved on to play for Enfield Ladies U-12s and U-14s scoring 96 goals in one season. She joined Arsenal Ladies centre of excellence and moved her way up to the reserve and first-team. Susi made her debut for Arsenal at only 17, coming off the bench against Everton Ladies. In 2005, Susi moved to Fulham for one season in order to gain further first team experience. After scoring 15 goals in only 19 appearances, she moved to Chelsea Ladies. Susi attended the University of Westminster, as a business economics student.
