= Danielle Bowman =

English footballer (born 1988)

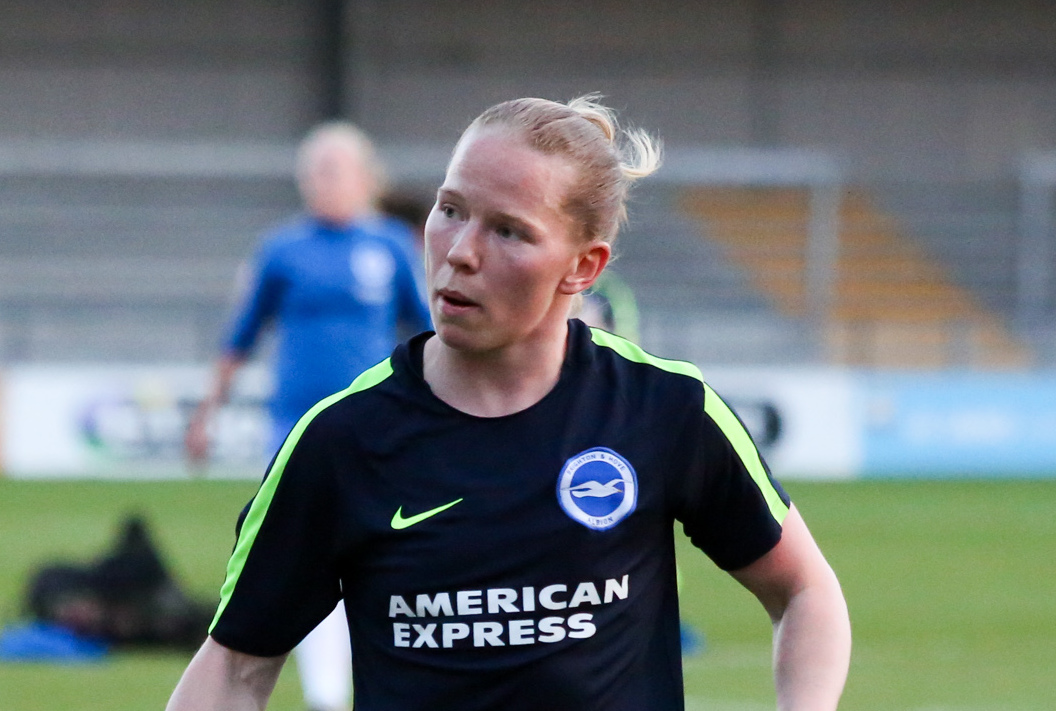
- Bowman in 2018

Personal information
- Full name: Danielle Josephine Bowman
- Birth name: Danielle Josephine Buet
- Date of birth: 31 October 1988 (age 37)
- Place of birth: Chatham, England
- Position: Midfielder

Youth career
- Castle Colts
- Arsenal Ladies

Senior career*
Years	Team	Apps	(Gls)
–2007	Arsenal	0	(0)
2007–2014	Chelsea	50	(7)
2015–2017	Notts County Ladies F.C.	29	(1)
2017–2022	Brighton & Hove Albion	32	(6)

International career^{‡}
2009–2011	England	8	(0)
- * Club domestic league appearances and goals ‡ National team caps and goals as of 09:50, 23 September 2011 (UTC)

Danielle Josephine Bowman (née Buet; born 31 October 1988) is an English football coach and retired professional footballer. She currently serves as the head coach for the Brighton & Hove Albion women's under-19 squad.

Bowman retired from professional play at the end of the 2021-22 season and began her coaching career as a first-team coach at West Ham United. In December 2023, she returned to Brighton & Hove Albion as the assistant head coach for the women's U19's, and was subsequently appointed head coach in September 2024.

== Club career ==
Bowman (then Buet) joined Notts County Ladies at the start of the 2015 season from Chelsea.

She joined Chelsea from Arsenal Ladies in 2007. This was due to a lack of first team chances and the club not giving her a UEFA Women's Cup medal despite taking part in the tournament. She scored twice on her Chelsea debut, a 9–1 win over Crewe Alexandra in the FA Women's Premier League Cup.

In October 2008 she was named FA Women's Premier League Player of the Month for September. That season Buet and Chelsea suffered the disappointment of a shock FA Women's Cup semi-final defeat to Northern Division Sunderland.

Brighton and Hove Albion announced they signed the midfielder in July 2017.

== International career ==
Buet played for England at Under-17 and Under-19 level and was a member of the victorious Under-19 European Championship side. She made her senior debut in March 2009, against South Africa, as a second-half substitute for Emily Westwood, having received her first call-up to the senior squad the previous September. Her first senior start came the same month in the 3–0 win against Scotland. In August 2009 she was named in coach Hope Powell's squad for Euro 2009.

She was given the Legacy Number 169 by The Football Association.

== Personal life ==
She attended St. Simon Stock Catholic School in Maidstone, followed by Loughborough University on the Talented Athlete Scholarship Scheme.

In the summer of 2019, Danielle married and took the surname Bowman.

== Honours ==
Individual

- Brighton & Hove Albion Goal of the Season: 2018-19
