= Katie Sherwood =

Welsh footballer (born 1986)

Personal information
- Full name: Katie Sherwood
- Date of birth: 5 January 1986 (age 40)
- Place of birth: Cardiff, Wales
- Height: 5 ft 5 in (1.65 m)
- Position: Midfielder

Youth career
- Cardiff City Sports Academy

College career
Years	Team	Apps	(Gls)
2005–2006	Middle Tennessee		

Senior career*
Years	Team	Apps	(Gls)
2001–2005	Cardiff City		
2007–2008	Cardiff City		
2008–2012	Bristol Academy		
2012	Chelsea Ladies		
2013–2014	Yeovil Town	11	(0)

International career^{‡}
2002–2012	Wales	50	(2)
- * Club domestic league appearances and goals as of 7 February 2012 ‡ National team caps and goals as of 7 February 2012

Katie Sherwood (née Daley; 5 January 1986) is a former footballer who played for the Welsh national women's team. Sherwood plays as a central midfielder and has a half-century of caps for Wales. She is from Llanrumney.

== Club career ==
Sherwood began her career at Cardiff City and won club Player of the Year, joint–Most Improved Player and the club Achievement Award for season 2001–02. The following season Sherwood helped Cardiff collect the Welsh Women's Cup and subsequently represented the club in the UEFA Women's Cup.

She won a scholarship to Middle Tennessee State University in 2005 and played varsity soccer for two seasons.

She returned to Cardiff City, but they were relegated in 2008. Sherwood then joined the Welsh contingent at Bristol Academy. In February 2012 she signed for Bristol's WSL rivals Chelsea Ladies and began using the surname Sherwood instead of Daley.

In November 2013 Sherwood signed for Yeovil Town, who were preparing to enter the new second tier of the FA WSL.

== International career ==
Sherwood captained Wales at youth level and eventually scored three goals in 24 games for the U19 team. In February 2002 she was called into the senior squad for the Algarve Cup. She made her senior debut, aged 16, in a 4–0 defeat to Canada in Lagoa, Portugal on 3 March 2002.

== Personal life ==
Sherwood is qualified as a teacher. She is married to Jamie Sherwood, who became manager of Cardiff City Ladies in summer 2012. They have one son.
