= 2015–16 Women's FA Cup =

Tournament details
- Country: England; Wales

Final positions
- Champions: Arsenal (14th title)
- Runners-up: Chelsea

The 2015–16 Women's FA Cup (also known as the SSE Women's FA Cup for sponsorship reasons) was the 46th staging of the FA Women's Cup, a knockout cup competition for women's football teams in England. Chelsea were the defending champions, having beaten Notts County 1–0 in the previous final. Arsenal were crowned champions, beating Chelsea 1–0.

== Format ==
The level of league football played by each team determined the stage of the competition in which they were inserted.

There were 262 entries this year and four qualifying round were played.

Entry points:

- WSL 1 teams: Fifth round
- WSL 2 teams: Third round
- Premier League national: Second round
- Premier League Regional: Third round qualifying

	1Q	2Q	3Q	4Q	1R	2R	3R	4R	5R	QF	SF	Final
New entries	142	33	44	—	—	24	10	—	9	—	—	—
Winners of previous round	—	71	52	48	24	12	18	14	7	8	4	2
Matches	71	52	48	24	12	18	14	7	8	4	2	1

== First round qualifying ==
Tie	Home team (tier)	Score	Away team (tier)	Att.
1	Cleveland (7)	0–7	Redcar Town (6)	
2	York City (5)	7–0	Cramlington United (7)	
3	Birtley Town (6)	0–2	Lowick United (6)	
4	Whitley Bay (5)	9–0	Rutherford (7)	
5	Ashington Woodhorn Lane (7)	2–3	Seaton (7)	
6	Sheffield United Community (5)	4–2	Harrogate Railway (6)	43
7	Wakefield (5)	0–3	Brighouse Athletic (7)	
8	Oughtibridge War Memorial (6)	2–1	Farsley Celtic (6)	130
9	Brighouse Town (5)	4–1 (Note: Brighouse Town were drawn as the home side, however the tie was reversed and consequently Ossett Albion hosted the fixture.)	Ossett Albion (6)	24
10	Winterton Rangers (6)	2–0	Wetherby Athletic (5)	37
11	Penrith (6)	3–0	Middleton Athletic (6)	
12	City of Manchester (5)	0–1	Blackburn Community Sports Club (5)	
13	Urmston Meadowside(6)	0–3	Accrington (5)	
14	Curzon Ashton (5)	1–2 (a.e.t.)	Chorltonians (7)	55
15	Woolton (6)	6–0	Blackpool (5)	
16	Bolton Wanderers (5)	2–1	Crewe Alexandra (5)	
17	Wigan Athletic (5)	7–0	Chester City	
18	Carlisle United (6)	1–3	Burnley (5)	48
19	CMB (6)	5–1	Merseyrail Bootle (6)	
20	Workington Reds (6)	1–2	Mersey (6)	40
21	Arnold Town (5)	2–1	Dronfield Town (7)	32
22	Rise Park (5)	2–2 (4–2 p)	Mansfield Hosiery Mills (6)	
23	Ruddington Village (6)	6–2	Sleaford Town (6)	
24	Teversal (6)	1–2	AFC Leicester (6)	
25	Nettleham (5)	6–0	Desford (7)	
26	Oadby & Wigston (7)	1–7	Long Eaton United (5)	
27	Coleshill Town (7)	3–1	Bradwell Belles (7)	62
28	Bilbrook (6)	3–1	Rubery (6)	
29	Stone Dominoes (6)	5–1	Malvern Town (6)	
30	Leek CSOB (7)	1–6	Stourbridge (7)	75
31	Knowle (5)	0–3	The New Saints (5)	60
32	Crusaders (5)	3–4	Burton Albion (6)	
33	Coundon Court (6)	1–4	Shrewsbury Town (6)	80
34	Lye Town (5)	4–2	Leek Town (7)	50
35	Kettering Town (5)	5–0	Rothwell Corinthians (6)	
36	Great Shelford (5)	6–1	March Town United (8)	82

Tie	Home team (tier)	Score	Away team (tier)	Att.
37	Huntingdon Town (7)	0–9	Acle United (5)	
38	Northampton Town (7)	2–1	Milton (8)	20
39	Riverside (6)	4–0	Fulbourn Institute Bluebirds (7)	
40	Moulton (6)	3–2	Netherton United (7)	
41	Wymondham Town (7)	6–2	Roade (7)	
42	Brentwood Town (5)	0–4	Great Wakering Rovers (5)	
43	West Billericay (6)	2–8	Sudbury (5)	
44	Brandon Town (7)	2–5	Bury Town (6)	83
45	Haringey Borough (5)	6–0	Leverstock Green (5)	
46	Garston (7)	1–2	Colney Heath (6)	
47	Sherrardswood (7)	0–6	Royston Town (6)	100
48	Dunstable (5)	1–3	Leyton Orient (5)	
49	Hoddesdon Owls (6)	3–5	Stevenage (5)	60
50	Hampton & Richmond Borough (7)	11–5	Bracknell Town (5)	
51	Marlow (5)	6–2	Ascot United (6)	
52	Woodley United (5)	2–0	Brentford (6)	25
53	Wargrave Ladies (7)	3–1	Headington (7)	
54	Oxford City (5)	H–W	Barton United (7)	
55	Wealdstone (7)	3–2	Banbury United (5)	
56	Rottingdean Village (7)	1–8	Crawley Wasps (5)	
57	Carshalton Athletic (5)	15–0	Barming (7)	57
58	Cowfold (7)	1–3	Bexhill United (5)	
59	Aylesford (5)	1–3	Eastbourne (5)	40
60	Margate (8)	2–6	Long Lane (6)	91
61	London Corinthians (5)	3–0	Parkwood Rangers (6)	
62	Abbey Rangers (7)	10–1	Worthing Town (7)	
63	Herne Bay (7)	2–0	Burgess Hill Town (6)	63
64	Ashford (6)	2–1	Hassocks (6)	
65	AFC Wimbledon (5)	9–0	Regents Park Rangers (6)	25
66	Southampton (6)	7–2	Winchester City Flyers (6)	
67	Royal Wootton Bassett Town (7)	1–5	Downend Flyers (5)	20
68	Torquay United (5)	0–2	Brislington (5)	
69	Cheltenham Civil Service (6)	1–3	Basingstoke Town (5)	
70	Ilminster Town (6)	1–7	Bristol Union (5)	
71	Wimborne Town (7)	8–0	Pen Mill (7)	

== Second round qualifying ==
Tie	Home team (tier)	Score	Away team (tier)	Att.
1	New Forest (6)	0–12	Poole Town (6)	
2	Hartlepool United (7)	2–1 (a.e.t.)	Redcar Town (6)	
3	Whitley Bay (5)	4–3 (a.e.t.)	York City (5)	
4	Boldon (5)	5–0	Prudhoe Town (6)	
5	Lowick United (6)	4–0	RACA Tynedale (5)	
6	Winterton Rangers (6)	3–1	Bradford Park Avenue (7)	
7	Sheffield United Community (5)	0–1	Handsworth (6)	
8	Oughtibridge War Memorial (6)	4–1	Sheffield Wednesday (6)	
9	Brighouse Town (5)	4–0	Brighouse Athletic (7)	
10	North Ferriby United (7)	0–9	Westella & Willerby (6)	
11	Woolton (6)	4–2	Mersey Girls (6)	
12	Penrith (6)	3–3 (4–3 p)	Burnley (5)	
13	Accrington Girls & Ladies (5)	3–1	CMB Ladies (6)	
14	Chorltonians (7)	1–3	Blackburn Community Sports Club (5)	
15	Bolton Wanderers (5)	0–2	Wigan Athletic (5)	
16	AFC Leicester (6)	1–3	Nettleham (5)	
17	Long Eaton United (5)	5–0	Rise Park (5)	
18	Ruddington Village (6)	8–3	Arnold Town (5)	
19	Lye Town (5)	7–0	Coleshill Town (7)	
20	Coventry Ladies Development FC (6)	3–2	Bedworth United (5)	
21	Stockingford AA Pavilion (6)	1–4	Shrewsbury Town (6)	
22	Wyrley (8)	2–2 (4–2 p)	Stone Dominoes (6)	
23	Burton Albion (6)	3–0	Stourbridge (7)	
24	The New Saints (5)	5–1	Bilbrook (6)	
25	Riverside (6)	4–2	Daventry Town (7)	
26	Kettering Town (5)	5–0	Sandy (7)	

Tie	Home team (tier)	Score	Away team (tier)	Att.
27	Acle United (5)	11–1	Newmarket Town (7)	
28	Northampton Town (7)	1–2 (a.e.t.)	Great Shelford (5)	
29	Moulton (6)	0–3	Wymondham Town (7)	
30	Colchester Town (5)	5–0	Silver End United (6)	
31	Sawbridgeworth Town (6)	1–0	AFC Sudbury Ladies (5)	
32	Bury Town (6)	1–5	Great Wakering Rovers Ladies FC (5)	
33	Leyton Orient (5)	2–0	Stevenage (5)	
34	Hemel Hempstead Town (5)	4–2	Colney Heath (6)	
35	Royston Town (6)	0–2	Haringey Borough (5)	
36	Oxford City (5)	0–1	Hampton & Richmond Borough (7)	
37	Wargrave (7)	3–7	Marlow (5)	
38	Wealdstone (7)	3–1	Newbury (5)	
39	Woodley United (5)	0–4	Queens Park Rangers Girls (6)	
40	Ashford Girls (6)	0–6	London Corinthians (5)	
41	Fulham (5)	2–1	Carshalton Athletic (5)	
42	Dartford Royals (6)	0–6	Crawley Wasps (5)	
43	Bexhill United (5)	1–2	Surrey Eagles (8)	
44	AFC Wimbledon (5)	10–0	Abbey Rangers (7)	
45	Long Lane (6)	4–0	Eastbourne Town (5)	
46	Frome Town (5)	1–2	AEK Boco (7)	
47	Bristol Ladies Union FC (5)	4–2	Middlezoy Rovers (5)	
48	Downend Flyers (5)	0–4	Basingstoke Town (5)	
49	Southampton (6)	4–0	Wimborne Town (7)	
50	Team Solent (6)	7–0	Fleet Town (6)	
51	Brislington (5)	6–2	Keynsham Town Development (6)	
52	Herne Bay (5)	2–0	Eastbourne (6)	

== Third qualifying round ==
Tie	Home team (tier)	Score	Away team (tier)	Att.
1	Blackburn Community Sports Club (5)	4–3	Wigan Athletic (5)	
2	Whitley Bay Women FC (5)	9–2	Westella & Willerby (6)	
3	Middlesbrough (4)	11–0	Lowick United (6)	
4	Woolton (6)	1–0	Boldon (5)	
5	Chester-Le-Street Town (4)	3–0	Accrington Girls & Ladies (5)	
6	Mossley Hill (4)	4–0	Penrith (5)	
7	Brighouse Town (5)	6–1	Winterton Rangers (6)	
8	Liverpool Marshalls Feds (4)	2–1	Chorley (4)	
9	Morecambe (4)	5–0	Leeds (4)	
10	Hull City (4)	1–1 (4–5 p)	Tranmere Rovers (4)	
11	Blackpool Wren Rovers (4)	1–2	Hartlepool United (7)	
12	Rotherham United (4)	4–5	Long Eaton United (5)	
13	The New Saints (5)	4–3	Leafield Athletic (4)	
14	Lye Town (5)	3–6	Nettleham (5)	
15	Wolverhampton Wanderers (4)	9–0	Handsworth (6)	
16	Leicester City Ladies (4)	7–4	Stockport County (4)	
17	Radcliffe Olympic (4)	2–1 (a.e.t.)	Oughtibridge War Memorial (6)	
18	Burton Albion (6)	6–0	Ruddington Village (6)	
19	Leicester City (4)	3–2	Loughborough Students (4)	
20	Stone Dominoes (6)	3–2 (a.e.t.)	Kettering Town (5)	
21	Coventry Ladies Development (6)	5–0	Shrewsbury Town (6)	
22	Sporting Khalsa (4)	1–3	Steel City Wanderers (4)	

Tie	Home team (tier)	Score	Away team (tier)	Att.
23	Wealdstone (7)	1–4	Bedford (4)	
24	Norwich City (4)	0–1	Marlow (5)	
25	Sawbridgeworth Town (6)	0–6	Ipswich Town (4)	
26	Luton Town (4)	3–1	Acle United (5)	
27	Enfield Town (4)	4–0	Haringey Borough (5)	
28	Wymondham Town (7)	1–0	Cambridge United (4)	
29	Leyton Orient (5)	0–2 (a.e.t.)	Great Shelford (5)	
30	Great Wakering Rovers Ladies FC (5)	1–3	Milton Keynes Dons (4)	
31	Hampton & Richmond Borough (7)	0–7	Peterborough Northern Star (4)	
32	Colchester Town (5)	1–2	Hemel Hempstead Town (5)	
33	Riverside (6)	0–4	Denham United (4)	
34	Queens Park Rangers Girls (6)	1–5	Lowestoft Town (4)	
35	Southampton (6)	2–2 (4–5 p)	London Corinthians (5)	
36	Crystal Palace (4)	5–0	Team Solent (6)	
37	Gloucester City	A–W	Southampton Saints (4)	
38	AEK Boco (7)	1–0	Shanklin (4)	
39	Gillingham (4)	7–0	AFC Wimbledon (5)	
40	Keynsham Town (4)	6–2	Cheltenham Town (4)	
41	Bristol Ladies Union (5)	1–3	Herne Bay (5)	
42	Larkhall Athletic (4)	11–1	Swindon Spitfires (4)	
43	Basingstoke Town (5)	0–2	Fulham (5)	
44	St Nicholas (4)	6–1	Surrey Eagles (8)	
45	Chichester City (4)	7–1	Poole Town (6)	
46	Crawley Wasps (5)	0–1	Actonians (4)	
47	Long Lane (6)	0–12	Swindon Town (4)	
48	Brislington (5)	2–3	Maidenhead United (4)	

== Fourth qualifying round ==
Drawn on 12 October. Ties played on 8 November. Ties 6,7,10,18 & 22 were postponed until 15 November. As Nettleham were unable to fulfil the fixture, Leicester City received a walkover. Tie 6 was postponed further until 22 November.

Tie	Home team (tier)	Score	Away team (tier)	Att.
1	Whitley Bay (5)	1–0	Woolton (6)	
2	Chester-Le-Street Town (4)	3–1	Brighouse Town (5)	
3	Morecambe (4)	6–3	Hartlepool United (7)	30
4	Mossley Hill (4)	4–2	Blackburn Community Sports Club (5)	25
5	Middlesbrough (4)	1–3	Liverpool Marshall Feds (4)	76
6	Tranmere Rovers (4)	3–0	Steel City Wanderers (4)	
7	Burton Albion (6)	1–1 (3–4 p)	Radcliffe Olympic (4)	
8	The New Saints (5)	0–3	Wolverhampton Wanderers (4)	
9	Long Eaton United (5)	4–1	Leicester City Ladies (4)	
10	Nettleham (5)	W-O	Leicester City (4)	
11	Coventry Ladies Development (6)	1–3	Stone Dominoes (6)	
12	Marlow (5)	1–4	Luton Town (4)	
13	Enfield Town (4)	1–0	Great Shelford (5)	80
14	Peterborough Northern Star (4)	8–0	Hemel Hempstead Town (5)	40
15	Wymondham Town (7)	0–2	Bedford (4)	
16	Ipswich Town (4)	2–3	Milton Keynes Dons (4)	
17	Lowestoft Town (4)	1–8	London Corinthians (5)	
18	Actonians (4)	4–1	Southampton Saints (4)	
19	Denham United (4)	1–2	Crystal Palace (4)	
20	AEK Boco (7)	0–10	Chichester City (4)	
21	Larkhall Athletic (4)	2–3	Swindon Town (4)	40
22	Fulham Foundation (5)	2–0	St Nicholas (4)	35
23	Keynsham Town (4)	5–0	Maidenhead United (4)	45
24	Gillingham (4)	3–0	Herne Bay (5)	

== First round proper ==
The draw was held on 9 November 2015. Ties were played on 6 December. Ties 1,2 & 11 were postponed until 13 December.

Number of teams per tier still in competition
WSL 1	WSL 2	Premier Division	Division One	Regional & County	Total
9 / 9	10 / 10	24 / 24	19 / 19	5 / 5	67 / 67

6 December 2015	Bedford (4)	2–3	Luton Town (4)	Wootton
	Hunter; Vass	Report	Rutherford 16'; Fensome 22'; Byron 73'	Stadium: Weston Park

6 December 2015	Fulham (5)	3–3 (a.e.t.) (3–1 p)	Enfield Town (4)	Guildford
	Goal	Report	Goal	Stadium: Surrey Sports Park; Attendance: 75
	Penalties
	Penalty scored		Penalty scored Penalty missed

6 December 2015	Leicester City (4)	8–0	Stone Dominoes (6)	Leicester
	Knight 11', 22', 36'; Impey 24', 54'; Morgan 49', 87'; Baxter 56'	Report		Stadium: Riverside Pavilion; Attendance: 89

6 December 2015	London Corinthians (5)	3–4 (a.e.t.)	Gillingham (4)	Eltham
	Goal	Report	Balfour 3'; North 94'; Baker-Carroll 103', 112'	Stadium: Badgers Sports Ground

6 December 2015	Long Eaton United (5)	3–2	Wolverhampton Wanderers (4)	Long Eaton
	Goal	Report	Anslow 47'; Cross 82'	Stadium: Grange Park

6 December 2015	Milton Keynes Dons (4)	0–4	Crystal Palace (4)	Newport Pagnell
		Report	Goal	Stadium: Willen Road; Attendance: 83

6 December 2015	Mossley Hill (4)	2–1	Liverpool Marshall Feds (4)	Mossley Hill
	Parkinson 64'; Lee 90+2'	Report	Apps 62'	Stadium: Mossley Hill Athletic Club; Attendance: 30

6 December 2015	Actonians (4)	0–1	Swindon Town (4)	Uxbridge
		Report	Maynard 87'	Stadium: Brunel University; Attendance: 13

6 December 2015	Peterborough Northern Star (4)	1–1 (a.e.t.) (2–4 p)	Radcliffe Olympic (4)	Peterborough
	Gallagher 98'	Report	Robinson 115'	Stadium: Chestnut Avenue; Attendance: 30
	Penalties
	Penalty scored Penalty missed		Penalty scored

13 December 2015	Chichester City (4)	6–0	Keynsham Town (4)	Chichester
	Fowlie 42', 68'; Blakely 49'; Amber 51'; Albuery 83'; Berrow 90+2'	Report		Stadium: Oaklands Park

13 December 2015	Morecambe (4)	5–3 (a.e.t.)	Chester Le Street Town (4)	Lancaster
	Goal	Report	Goal	Stadium: Lancaster & Morecambe College

13 December 2015	Tranmere Rovers (4)	2–3	Whitley Bay (5)	Ellesmere Port
	Goal	Report	Goal	Stadium: Ellesmere Port Sports Village

== Second round proper ==
The 24 Premier League Northern and Southern Divisions sides entered the draw at the asecond round proper. All matches were played in January 2016.

Number of teams per tier still in competition
WSL 1	WSL 2	Premier Division	Division One	Regional & County	Total
9 / 9	10 / 10	24 / 24	9 / 19	3 / 5	55 / 67

10 January 2016	Brighton & Hove Albion (3)	7–0	Luton Town (4)	Lancing
	Blackie 29'; Perry 37'; Gurr 44'; Barton 51'; Fulgence 69'; Cooper 73'; Olding 90'	Report		Stadium: Culver Road; Attendance: 143

10 January 2016	Charlton Athletic (3)	9–0	Plymouth Argyle (3)	Thamesmead
	Graham 18', 32', 60'; Shepherd 42', 74', 89'; Simmons 58'; Dixson 68'; Jones	Report		Stadium: Bayliss Avenue; Attendance: 92

10 January 2016	Fulham (5)	0–10	Lewes (3)	Guildford
		Report	Heather 3', 82'; Khassal 23', 27', 58'; Spice 30', 50'; Wells 44'; Lane 48'; Newton 76'	Stadium: Surrey Sports Park; Attendance: 74

10 January 2016	Leicester City (4)	2–1	Radcliffe Olympic (4)	Leicester
	Busby 76', 81'	Report	Saulter 17'	Stadium: Riverside Pavilion; Attendance: 105

10 January 2016	Newcastle United (3)	4–1	Mossley Hill (4)	Belmont
	Dobson 12', 43'; Purdham 40'; Turnbull 67'	Report	McDonald 85'	Stadium: New Ferens Park; Attendance: 112

10 January 2016	Nottingham Forest (3)	3–0	Morecambe (4)	Basford
	Bell 11'; Ejupi 53'; Copeland 66'	Report		Stadium: Greenwich Avenue; Attendance: 52

10 January 2016	Portsmouth (3)	2–0	Cardiff City (3)	Gosport
	Quinn 18'; Kempson 50'	Report		Stadium: Privett Park; Attendance: 50

10 January 2016	Preston North End (3)	2–1	Derby County (3)	Accrington
	Goal	Report	Johnson 34'	Stadium: Accrington & Rossendale Sports College; Attendance: 42

17 January 2016	C&K Basildon (3)	0–2	Coventry United (3)	Canvey Island
		Report	Neville 30'; Hall 90'	Stadium: Park Lane; Attendance: 90

17 January 2016	Forest Green Rovers (3)	1–1 (a.e.t.) (1–3 p)	Gillingham (4)	Cambridge
	Richardson 54'	Report	Balfour	Stadium: Thornhill Park; Attendance: 40
	Penalties
	Penalty scored Penalty missed		Penalty scored

17 January 2016	Sporting Club Albion (3)	3–0	Long Eaton United (5)	Halesowen
	Dugmore; Greaves; Haynes	Report		Stadium: Grove Recreation Ground; Attendance: 20

24 January 2016	Bradford City (3)	3–0	Huddersfield Town (3)	Wrose
	Goal	Report		Stadium: Kingsway

24 January 2016	Chichester City (4)	3–4	Queens Park Rangers (3)	Chichester
	Found 25', 80'	Report	Goal	Stadium: Oaklands Park

24 January 2016	Crystal Palace (4)	1–2	West Ham United (3)	Bromley
	Goal	Report	Pinna 20'; Locke 28'	Stadium: Hayes Lane; Attendance: 104

24 January 2016	Loughborough Foxes (3)	4–1	Guiseley AFC Vixens (3)	Loughborough
	Goal	Report	Bates	Stadium: Loughborough University Stadium

24 January 2016	Swindon Town (4)	1–4	Tottenham Hotspur (3)	Royal Wootton Bassett
	Hurst 56'	Report	Rawle; Bergin; Austin (o.g.)	Stadium: New Gerard Buxton Sports Ground

24 January 2016	Whitley Bay (5)	0–2	Stoke City (3)	Whitley Bay
		Report	Hayes 54'; Hunt 86'	Stadium: Hillheads Park

31 January 2016	Blackburn Rovers (3)	3–0	Nuneaton Town (3)	Darwen
	Shepherd 19'; Fleming 49'; Toone 71'	Report		Stadium: The WEC Group Anchor Ground

== Third round proper ==
The 10 WSL 2 sides entered the draw at the third round proper. All matches were played in February 2016.

Number of teams per tier still in competition
WSL 1	WSL 2	Premier Division	Division One	Regional & County	Total
9 / 9	10 / 10	16 / 24	2 / 19	0 / 5	37 / 67

7 February 2016	Aston Villa (2)	1–0	Portsmouth (3)	Sutton Coldfield
	Goal	Report		Stadium: Central Ground; Attendance: 183

7 February 2016	Brighton & Hove Albion (3)	10–0	Oxford United (2)	Lancing
	Perry; Fulgence; Taylor; Gurr; Natkiel	Report		Stadium: Culver Road; Attendance: 402

7 February 2016	Charlton Athletic (3)	10–0	Newcastle United (3)	Thamesmead
	Shepherd 4', 9', 15', 31', 54'; Graham 36', 44', 46'; Simmons 60'	Report		Stadium: Bayliss Avenue; Attendance: 235

7 February 2016	Everton (2)	7–0	Stoke City (3)	Widnes
	Magill 7'; Hollinshead 11', 34'; Hinnigan 56'; Walker 68'; Jones 75'; Boye-Hlorkah 78'	Report		Stadium: Halton Stadium; Attendance: 484

7 February 2016	Gillingham (4)	0–1	Tottenham Hotspur (3)	Chatham
		Report	Baptiste 8'	Stadium: The Bauvill Stadium; Attendance: 126

7 February 2016	London Bees (2)	0–9	Durham (2)	Edgware
		Report	Atkinson 8'; Hepple 10', 33', 53'; Gutteridge 28'; Macek 80'; White	Stadium: The Hive Stadium; Attendance: 197

7 February 2016	Leicester City (4)	1–5	Sheffield (2)	Leicester
	Goal	Report	Goal	Stadium: Riverside

7 February 2016	Sporting Club Albion (3)	1–0	Coventry United (3)	Halesowen
	Poole 26'	Report		Stadium: Grove Recreation Ground

7 February 2016	Watford (2)	1–3 (a.e.t.)	Millwall Lionesses (2)	Berkhamsted
	Goal	Report	Goal	Stadium: Broadwater; Attendance: 243

7 February 2016	West Ham United (3)	0–7	Blackburn Rovers (3)	Upminster
		Report	S. Jones 17'; Jordan 21', 45'; Shepherd 26', 55', 81'; Johnson 82'	Stadium: Hornchurch Stadium; Attendance: 39; Referee: Peter Smith

14 February 2016	Bristol City (2)	7–1	Queens Park Rangers (3)	Filton
	Farrow 1', 86'; Yorston 6'; Arthur 13'; Brett 48'; McCatty 84'; Pinto 90'	Report	Richardson 5'	Stadium: Stoke Gifford Stadium; Attendance: 376; Referee: Philip Staynings

14 February 2016	Loughborough Foxes (3)	1–1 (a.e.t.) (6–5 p)	Lewes (3)	Loughborough
	Goal	Report	Lane 12'	Stadium: Loughborough University Stadium; Attendance: 45
	Penalties
	Penalty scored		Penalty scored Penalty missed

14 February 2016	Nottingham Forest (3)	2–0	Preston North End (3)	Basford
	McKechnie 23'; Ejupi 43'	Report		Stadium: Greenwich Avenue

14 February 2016	Yeovil Town (2)	2–0	Bradford City (3)	Yeovil
	Wiltshire 14'; Knapman 90'	Report		Stadium: Huish Park; Attendance: 175

== Fourth round proper ==
Ties were played on 28 February 2016. Brighton & Hove Albion initially won 2–1, but were forced to replay their game, as they named too many substitutes (7 instead of 5) on the match form. The tie was replayed on 13 March.

Number of teams per tier still in competition
WSL 1	WSL 2	Premier Division	Division One	Regional & County	Total
9 / 9	7 / 10	7 / 24	0 / 19	0 / 5	23 / 67

28 February 2016	Bristol City (2)	0–0 (2–3 p)	Yeovil Town (2)	Filton
		Report		Stadium: Stoke Gifford Stadium; Attendance: 436
	Penalties
	Ladd (penalty scored); Yorston (penalty missed); McCatty (penalty missed); Farrow (penalty scored); Ayane (penalty missed)		(penalty scored) Primus; (penalty missed) Townsend; (penalty scored) Wiltshire; (penalty scored) Bleazard

28 February 2016	Durham (2)	3–1	Charlton Athletic (3)	Belmont
	Hepple 19'; Gutteridge 43', 87'	Report	Shepherd 26'	Stadium: New Ferens Park; Attendance: 197; Referee: Helen Conley

28 February 2016	Everton (2)	5–0	Nottingham Forest (3)	Widnes
	K. Jones 41'; Walker 43'; Hinnigan 51', 76'; Hollinshead 90'	Report		Stadium: Halton Stadium; Attendance: 304; Referee: Mark Duncan

28 February 2016	Loughborough Foxes (3)	1–2 (a.e.t.)	Millwall Lionesses (2)	Loughborough
	Goal	Report	Goal	Stadium: Loughborough University Stadium; Attendance: 80

28 February 2016	Sheffield (2)	1–3	Sporting Club Albion (3)	Dronfield
	Goal	Report	Goal	Stadium: Home of Football; Attendance: 80

28 February 2016	Tottenham Hotspur (3)	2–3	Aston Villa (2)	Cheshunt
	Baptiste 2', 64'	Report	Toussaint 29'; Rouse 83'; Wilkinson 109'	Stadium: Theobalds Lane; Attendance: 217

13 March 2016	Brighton & Hove Albion (3)	5–2	Blackburn Rovers (3)	Bognor Regis
	Agg 5'; Somes 7'; Perry 15'; Natkiel 70'; Fulgence 90'	Report	Strickland 3', 56'	Stadium: Nyewood Lane; Attendance: 135

== Fifth round proper ==
Seven winners of the previous round were joined by the nine WSL 1 teams. Matches were played on 19 and 20 March 2016.

Number of teams per tier still in competition
WSL 1	WSL 2	Premier Division	Division One	Regional & County	Total
9 / 9	5 / 10	2 / 24	0 / 19	0 / 5	16 / 67

19 March 2016	Liverpool (1)	0–2	Manchester City (1)	Widnes
		Report	Stanway 30'; Parris 64'	Stadium: Halton Stadium; Attendance: 743; Referee: P. Gibbons

20 March 2016	Aston Villa (2)	1–0	Everton (2)	Sutton Coldfield
	George 57'	Report		Stadium: Central Ground

20 March 2016	Birmingham City (1)	1–1 (a.e.t.) (3–5 p)	Arsenal (1)	Solihull
	Ayisi 26'	Report	Carter 67'	Stadium: Damson Park; Referee: Darren Wilding
	Penalties
	Linnett (penalty scored); Harrop (penalty scored); Wellings (penalty missed); Haines (penalty scored)		(penalty scored) F. Williams; (penalty scored) Natalia; (penalty scored) Smith; (penalty scored) Carter; (penalty scored) Nobbs

20 March 2016	Brighton & Hove Albion (3)	3–4	Sporting Club Albion (3)	Lancing
	Fulgence 40'; Perry 55'; Boswell 81'	Report	Conroy; Cottam; Holmes; Poole	Stadium: Culver Road

20 March 2016	Doncaster Rovers Belles (1)	1–4	Chelsea (1)	Doncaster
	Sigsworth 5'	Report	Hobbs 14' (o.g.); Carney 59'; Ji 70'; Aluko 73'	Stadium: Keepmoat Stadium; Attendance: 525; Referee: Tom Nield

20 March 2016	Notts County (1)	3–1	Durham (2)	Nottingham
	R. Williams 15', 55'; White 29'	Report	Hepple 76'	Stadium: Meadow Lane; Attendance: 497

20 March 2016	Reading (1)	2–0	Millwall Lionesses (2)	High Wycombe
	Goal	Report		Stadium: Adams Park

20 March 2016	Yeovil Town (2)	0–2	Sunderland (1)	Yeovil
		Report	Chaplen 67', 79'	Stadium: Huish Park; Attendance: 517; Referee: James Robinson

== Quarter-finals ==
Sporting Club Albion were the only team from outside the FA WSL to reach the quarter-finals. Matches were played on 3 April 2016.

Number of teams per tier still in competition
WSL 1	WSL 2	Premier Division	Division One	Regional & County	Total
6 / 9	1 / 10	1 / 24	0 / 19	0 / 5	8 / 67

3 April 2016	Sunderland (1)	3–0	Reading (1)	Hetton-le-Hole
	Mead 35'; Williams 41'; Chaplen 90'	Report		Stadium: Eppleton Colliery Welfare Ground; Attendance: 407; Referee: Shaun Hudson

3 April 2016	Manchester City (1)	2–0	Sporting Club Albion (3)	Manchester
	Parris 7'; Ross 22'	Report		Stadium: Academy Stadium; Attendance: 1,270; Referee: Peter Gooch

3 April 2016	Chelsea (1)	6–0	Aston Villa (2)	Staines-upon-Thames
	Spence 39'; Ji 61', 86', 89'; Kirby 66'; Aluko 88'	Report		Stadium: Wheatsheaf Park; Attendance: 1,147; Referee: Garry Maskell

3 April 2016	Arsenal (1)	2–2 (a.e.t.) (4–3 p)	Notts County (1)	Borehamwood
	Smith 21'; Natalia 81'	Report	Bradley-Auckland 23'; Luik 33'	Stadium: Meadow Park; Attendance: 709; Referee: Paul Kelly
	Penalties
	F. Williams (penalty scored); Natalia (penalty scored); Nobbs (penalty missed); Smith (penalty scored); Carter (penalty missed); McCabe (penalty scored)		(penalty missed) Buet; (penalty scored) Clarke; (penalty missed) Crichton; (penalty scored) R. Williams; (penalty scored) Weston; (penalty missed) Luik

== Semi-finals ==
Matches were played on Sunday 17 April 2016.

Number of teams per tier still in competition
WSL 1	WSL 2	Premier Division	Division One	Regional & County	Total
4 / 9	0 / 10	0 / 24	0 / 19	0 / 5	4 / 67

17 April 2016	Chelsea (1)	2–1 (a.e.t.)	Manchester City (1)	Staines
	Ji 86'; Kirby 119'	Report	Ross 73'	Stadium: Wheatsheaf Park; Attendance: 2,278; Referee: Sam Purkiss

17 April 2016	Arsenal (1)	7–0	Sunderland (1)	Borehamwood
	Van de Donk 39', 77', 85'; Carter 55', 91'; Williams 73'; Nobbs 82'	Report		Stadium: Meadow Park; Attendance: 902; Referee: Christopher O'Donnell

== Final ==
14 May 2016
14:00 BST

Arsenal	1–0	Chelsea
Carter 18'	Report

Wembley Stadium, London
Attendance: 32,912
Referee: Sarah Garratt
