= 2017–18 Women's FA Cup =

Tournament details
- Country: England; Wales
- Teams: 276

Final positions
- Champions: Chelsea (2nd title)
- Runners-up: Arsenal

Tournament statistics
- Matches played: 266
- Goals scored: 1,335 (5.02 per match)

The 2017–18 Women's FA Cup (also known as the SSE Women's FA Cup for sponsorship reasons) was the 48th staging of the FA Women's Cup, a knockout cup competition for women's football teams in England. Manchester City were the defending champions, having beaten Birmingham City 4–1 in the previous final.

== Teams ==
A total of 276 teams had their entries to the tournament accepted by The Football Association. One hundred and eighty-five teams entered at the first or second round qualifying. Teams that play in the FA Women's Premier League Division One were given exemption to the third round qualifying, while teams in the Northern and Southern Division entered at the second round proper. Teams in the FA WSL were exempted to the fourth round proper.

Round	Clubs remaining	Clubs involved	Winners from previous round	Games played	Goals scored	Prize money
First round qualifying	276	174	–	82	475	£350
Second round qualifying	189	98	87	47	270	£450
Third round qualifying	140	96	49	47	244	£500
First round	92	48	48	23	53	£800
Second round	68	48	24	24	103	£900
Third round	44	24	24	12	56	£1,000
Fourth round	32	32	12	16	68	£2,000
Fifth round	16	16	16	8	36	£3,000
Quarter-Final	8	8	8	4	21	£4,000
Semi-Final	4	4	4	2	5	£5,000
The Final	2	2	2	1	4	£15,000 (runners-up) £25,000 (winners)

The first round qualifying saw five ties cancelled due to the withdrawal of one of the teams, with two additional ties awarded to the losing teams after the winning teams were disqualified. The second round qualifying saw two ties cancelled as a result of withdrawals, while the third round qualifying saw one withdrawal with one additional tie awarded to the losing team after disqualification. The first round proper saw one tie cancelled due to the withdrawal of Basingstoke Town after an initial postponement.

== First round qualifying ==
Eighty seven matches were scheduled for the first qualifying round. Most matches were played on Sunday 3 September 2017, the only exception being Buckland Athletic v Exeter City, which took place on the following Sunday after the match was initially postponed due to a waterlogged pitch.

Tie	Home team (tier)	Score	Away team (tier)	Att.
1	Alnwick Town Juniors (7)	3–2	Washington (7)	53
2	Blyth Town Lions (6)	0–3	South Shields (6)	
3	RACA Tynedale (5)	A–W	Norton & Stockton Ancients (5)	
4	Penrith (6)	4–2	South Park Rangers (7)	
5	Workington Reds (6)	1–2	Redcar Town (7)	
6	Prudhoe Town (6)	2–5 (a.e.t.) (Note: Abandoned after 116 minutes due to serious injury.)	Chester-Le-Street SCFC (7)	
7	Bishop Auckland (7)	4–2	Gateshead Leam Rangers (7)	
8	Carlisle United (6)	3–1	Wallsend Boys Club (5)	48
9	Sheffield Wednesday (6)	2–1	Yorkshire Amateur (7)	
10	Altofts (6)	H–W (Note: Game played as a friendly with Altofts winning 5–0 after Bradford Park Avenue withdrawn.)	Bradford Park Avenue (8)	
11	Malet Lambert (6)	4–5 (a.e.t.)	Wakefield (5)	
12	Ossett Albion (6)	0–5	Farsley Celtic (5)	
13	Dronfield Town (7)	0–5 (Note: Abandoned after 68 minutes due to serious injury.)	Harworth Colliery (7)	
14	Nelson (8)	0–14	Blackpool (5)	
15	Merseyrail Bootle (5)	4–2	Stockport County (5)	
16	Wigan Athletic (5)	7–0	Accrington (5)	
17	FC United Of Manchester (6)	13–1	Altrincham (6)	
18	West Didsbury & Chorlton (6)	3–2	Warrington Wolverines (6)	
19	Manchester Stingers (5)	2–1	Blackburn Community Sports Club (5)	
20	Fleetwood Town Wrens (5)	0–6	Burnley (5)	
21	Lincoln Moorlands Railway (6)	4–3	Cosby United (6)	
22	Loughborough Students (5)	4–2	Mansfield Town (5)	20
23	AFC Leicester (6)	0–2	Leicester City Women Development (5)	
24	Rise Park (5)	7–3	Teversal (6)	
25	Market Warsop (6)	0–5	Nettleham (5)	
26	Eastwood (5)	3–0	Arnold Town (5)	
27	Leafield Athletic (5)	5–1	Knowle (5)	39
28	Leek Town (6)	2–1	Solihull United (6)	68
29	Wyrley (6)	0–3	Lye Town (5)	
30	Redditch United (6)	2–1	Stockingford AA Pavilion (5)	
31	Shrewsbury Town (6)	4–2	Wolverhampton Sporting Community (5)	68
32	Solihull Sporting (6)	0–8	Coventry Sphinx (6)	
33	Crusaders (5)	6–2	Abbey Hulton United (7)	30
34	Shrewsbury Juniors (6)	0–3	Brereton Town (6)	
35	Coundon Court (5)	2–6	Goldenhill Wanderers (6)	42
36	Rugby Town (6)	1–4	Worcester United (5)	
37	Sutton Coldfield Town (6)	0–4	Bedworth United (5)	
38	Gornal (6)	H–W	Stone Dominoes (6)	
39	Newmarket Town (7)	4–2	Histon (6)	85
40	Kettering Town (5)	10–0	Woodford United (8)	35
41	Sprowston (7)	0–4	Wymondham Town (6)	
42	Roade (7)	0–1	St Ives Town (7)	
43	Oadby & Wigston (6)	1–3	King's Lynn Town (6)	
44	Peterborough Northern Star (5)	H–W	Netherton United (7)	

Tie	Home team (tier)	Score	Away team (tier)	Att.
45	Cambridge City (5)	8–2	Moulton (7)	
46	Riverside (6)	2–1	Corby Town (6)	
47	March Town United (7)	0–5	Peterborough United (6)	80
48	Acle United (5)	4–1	Thrapston Town (6)	85
49	Colchester Town (5)	2–4	Bungay Town (7)	
50	Harlow Town (6)	4–0	Little Thurrock Dynamos (6)	
51	Brentwood Town (5)	6–0	Corringham Cosmos (7)	
52	AFC Sudbury (5)	4–3	Writtle (5)	
53	Billericay Town (5)	8–0	Chelmsford City (7)	
54	Milton Keynes City (5)	2–4 (a.e.t.)	Bedford (5)	50
55	Sandy (7)	A–W	Hemel Hempstead Town (6)	
56	AFC Dunstable (5)	5–0	Houghton Athletic (7)	
57	Royston Town (5)	7–0	Watford Ladies Development (5)	80
58	Hertford Town (6)	0–1	Bishop's Stortford (6)	
59	Garston (7)	1–4	Colney Heath (5)	
60	Brentford (7)	1–7	Chesham United (5)	25
61	Headington (7)	0–17	Ashford Town (Middx) (7)	
62	Ascot United (5)	1–1 (4–3 p)	Newbury (5)	73
63	Benson Lionesses (6)	4–2	Wargrave (6)	
64	Fleet Town (6)	1–8	Alton (6)	
65	Oxford City (5)	A–W (Note: Oxford City won the game 9–0 before being disqualified for fielding an unregistered player.)	Woodley United (6)	
66	Chinnor (7)	0–12	New London Lionesses (7)	
67	Queens Park Rangers Girls (6)	0–1	Hampton & Richmond Borough (7)	
68	Meridian (6)	2–1	Fulham Foundation (5)	
69	Ashford (6)	2–3	Aylesford (5)	25
70	Kent Football United (6)	0–4	London Kent Football United (5)	30
71	Worthing (6)	1–2	Godalming Town (7)	
72	Eastbourne Town (5)	7–0	Dartford (7)	
73	Worthing Town (8)	1–7	Parkwood Rangers (5)	
74	Victoire (6)	2–2 (2–4 p)	Burgess Hill Town (7)	
75	Whyteleafe (6)	1–0	Bexhill United (6)	
76	Abbey Rangers (8)	1–2	Eastbourne (6)	
77	Carshalton Athletic (5)	A–W (Note: Carshalton Athletic won the game 3–0 before being disqualified.)	Herne Bay (6)	35
78	Frampton Rangers (7)	2–3	New Milton Town (5)	
79	Buckland Athletic (5)	9–2	Exeter City (5)	
80	AEK Boco (5)	0–9	Downend Flyers (5)	
81	FC Chippenham (6)	4–3 (a.e.t.)	Team Solent (5)	
82	Middlezoy Rovers (5)	1–7	Marine Academy Plymouth (5)	20
83	Royal Wootton Bassett Town (6)	2–5	AFC Bournemouth (6)	
84	Warsash Wasps (6)	4–0	Ilminster Town (5)	54
85	Winchester City Flyers (5)	5–0	Frome Town (6)	
86	Bournemouth Sports (7)	3–1	Keynsham Town Development (5)	
87	Eastleigh (6)	0–6	Torquay United (5)	

== Second round qualifying ==
Forty nine matches were scheduled for the second qualifying round. The 98 teams taking part consisted of 11 teams exempted to this stage, plus the 87 match winners from the previous round. Most matches were played on Sunday 17 September 2017, the only exception being Woodley United v Alton, which was delayed for a week due to the late disqualification of Oxford City.

Tie	Home team (tier)	Score	Away team (tier)	Att.
1	Alnwick Town Juniors (7)	1–0	Redcar Town (7)	57
2	Cramlington United (6)	1–7	Carlisle United (6)	
3	Bishop Auckland (7)	1–6	South Shields (6)	48
4	Chester-Le-Street SCFC (7)	0–9	Hartlepool United (5)	
5	Norton & Stockton Ancients (5)	3–2 (a.e.t.)	Penrith (6)	150
6	Worksop Town (8)	3–5	Farsley Celtic (5)	
7	Altofts (6)	4–3 (a.e.t.)	Sheffield Wednesday (6)	
8	Wakefield (5)	4–3	Harworth Colliery (7)	
9	Blackpool (5)	2–2 (2–3 p)	West Didsbury & Chorlton (6)	52
10	CMB Ladies (5)	2–1	Tranmere Rovers (5)	40
11	Burnley (5)	4–3	Merseyrail Bootle (5)	40
12	Manchester Stingers (5)	0–6	MSB Woolton (5)	
13	Wigan Athletic (5)	1–0	FC United Of Manchester (6)	
14	Eastwood (5)	4–0	Rise Park (5)	
15	Loughborough Students (5)	6–3	Lincoln Moorlands Railway (6)	25
16	Leicester City Women Development (5)	2–3 (a.e.t.)	Nettleham (5)	45
17	Shrewsbury Town (6)	5–2	Leek Town (6)	
18	Redditch United (6)	5–1	Goldenhill Wanderers (6)	
19	Leafield Athletic (5)	1–2	Lye Town (5)	
20	Bedworth United (5)	2–0 (a.e.t.)	Gornal (6)	62
21	Worcester United (5)	2–8	Coventry Sphinx (6)	
22	Brereton Town (6)	2–1	Crusaders (5)	
23	Newmarket Town (7)	4–3 (a.e.t.)	King's Lynn Town (6)	
24	Acle United (5)	H–W	Riverside (6)	
25	Cambridge City (5)	5–2	Kettering Town (5)	

Tie	Home team (tier)	Score	Away team (tier)	Att.
26	Peterborough Northern Star (5)	4–2	Peterborough United (6)	
27	Wymondham Town (6)	7–1	St Ives Town (7)	
28	Frontiers (7)	1–8	AFC Sudbury (5)	49
29	Harlow Town (6)	3–2	Bungay Town (7)	45
30	Brentwood Town (5)	2–3	Billericay Town (5)	
31	Colney Heath (5)	0–4	Royston Town (5)	
32	Hemel Hempstead Town (6)	0–12	Bedford (5)	
33	AFC Dunstable (5)	7–1	Bishop's Stortford (6)	
34	Benson Lionesses (6)	1–12	Ashford Town (Middx) (7)	
35	New London Lionesses (7)	2–0	Hampton & Richmond Borough (7)	
36	Ascot United (5)	0–2	Chesham United (5)	
37	Woodley United (6)	2–1	Alton (6)	35
38	Eastbourne Town (5)	5–2	Aylesford (5)	
39	Godalming Town (7)	3–2 (a.e.t.)	Eastbourne (6)	
40	Meridian (6)	2–3	London Kent Football United (5)	20
41	Hassocks (6)	5–1	Margate (7)	
42	Herne Bay (6)	1–3	Parkwood Rangers (5)	32
43	Whyteleafe (6)	6–0	Burgess Hill Town (7)	
44	Marine Academy Plymouth (5)	A–W	Buckland Athletic (5)	
45	FC Chippenham (6)	2–1	Bournemouth Sports (7)	
46	New Milton Town (5)	5–4	Downend Flyers (5)	50
47	Pen Mill (7)	1–4	Forest Green Rovers (5)	76
48	Torquay United (5)	1–0	AFC Bournemouth (6)	
49	Winchester City Flyers (5)	5–1	Warsash Wasps (6)	

== Third round qualifying ==
Forty eight matches were scheduled for the third qualifying round. The 96 teams taking part consisted of 47 teams from the FA Women's Premier League Division One exempted to this stage, plus the 49 match winners from the previous round. Most matches were played on Sunday 8 October 2017, except two which were postponed to the following week.

Tie	Home team (tier)	Score	Away team (tier)	Att.
1	Alnwick Town Juniors (7)	5–0	Rotherham United (4)	82
2	Farsley Celtic (5)	H–W (Note: Hartlepool United won the game 3–1 before being disqualified for fielding an ineligible player.)	Hartlepool United (5)	
3	Burnley (5)	4–1	Wigan Athletic (5)	35
4	West Didsbury & Chorlton (6)	6–3	MSB Woolton (5)	
5	Brighouse Town (4)	6–1	Wakefield (5)	104
6	Altofts (6)	1–5	Chorley (4)	
7	Chester-Le-Street Town (4)	2–1	Barnsley (4)	
8	Crewe Alexandra (4)	1–4	Hull City (4)	32
9	South Shields (6)	0–3	Norton & Stockton Ancients (5)	
10	CMB Ladies (5)	2–5	Bolton Wanderers (4)	42
11	Liverpool Marshalls Feds (4)	7–0	Mossley Hill (4)	
12	Steel City Wanderers (4)	2–1	Morecambe (4)	40
13	Sheffield United (4)	3–3 (3–2 p)	Leeds United (4)	
14	Newcastle United (4)	9–1	Carlisle United (6)	
15	Redditch United (6)	5–2	Solihull Moors (4)	
16	Sporting Khalsa (4)	6–1	Lye Town (5)	40
17	The New Saints (4)	3–1	Shrewsbury Town (6)	
18	Eastwood (5)	5–3	Coventry Sphinx (6)	
19	Long Eaton United (4)	3–1	Leicester City Ladies (4)	
20	Bedworth United (5)	2–1	Birmingham & West Midlands (4)	53
21	Radcliffe Olympic (4)	A–W	Loughborough Foxes (4)	
22	Loughborough Students (5)	3–0	Brereton Town (6)	83
23	Burton Albion (4)	0–4	Nettleham (5)	30
24	Milton Keynes Dons (4)	2–0	Actonians (4)	76

Tie	Home team (tier)	Score	Away team (tier)	Att.
25	Cambridge City (5)	1–5	Ipswich Town (4)	
26	Maidenhead United (4)	0–1	Luton Town (4)	
27	Cambridge United (4)	4–0	Norwich City (4)	48
28	Peterborough Northern Star (5)	1–3	Acle United (5)	
29	Harlow Town (6)	1–0	Denham United (4)	90
30	Wymondham Town (6)	9–2 (a.e.t.)	Newmarket Town (7)	175
31	Enfield Town (4)	1–0	AFC Sudbury (5)	
32	Godalming Town (7)	5–0	Haringey Borough (4)	
33	Ashford Town (Middx) (7)	6–4	London Kent Football United (5)	
34	AFC Dunstable (5)	2–0	Eastbourne Town (5)	49
35	New London Lionesses (7)	3–1 (a.e.t.)	Parkwood Rangers (5)	
36	Leyton Orient (4)	7–0	Billericay Town (5)	207
37	Hassocks (6)	0–8	Stevenage (4)	
38	Bedford (5)	2–3	Royston Town (5)	
39	Chesham United (5)	2–1	Whyteleafe (6)	
40	AFC Wimbledon (4)	14–1	Woodley United (6)	50
41	Cheltenham Town (4)	1–4	Southampton Saints (4)	
42	FC Chippenham (6)	1–6	Basingstoke Town (4)	
43	Poole Town (4)	2–5	Plymouth Argyle (4)	34
44	St Nicholas (4)	0–1	Keynsham Town (4)	55
45	New Milton Town (5)	1–4	Buckland Athletic (5)	60
46	Winchester City Flyers (5)	0–7	Southampton (4)	
47	Forest Green Rovers (5)	0–3	Larkhall Athletic (4)	
48	Brislington (4)	0–0 (4–2 p)	Torquay United (5)	63

== First round proper ==
Twenty four matches were scheduled for the first round proper. Twenty three matches were played on Sunday 12 November 2017, with Plymouth Argyle v Basingstoke Town postponed to the following Sunday before being awarded to Plymouth following Basingstoke's withdrawal.

Number of teams per tier still in competition
WSL 1	WSL 2	Premier Division	Division One	Regional & County	Total
10 / 10	10 / 10	24 / 24	28 / 28	20 / 20	92 / 92

12 November 2017	AFC Dunstable (5)	0–4	Luton Town (4)	Dunstable
		Report	Goal	Stadium: Creasey Park; Attendance: 102; Referee: a

12 November 2017	AFC Wimbledon (4)	5–0	Godalming Town (7)	Sutton
	Measures 5'; Sargent 28'; Whelan 41'; Heasman 50', 85'	Report		Stadium: Gander Green Lane; Attendance: 90; Referee: Marian Puscoci

12 November 2017	Alnwick Town Juniors (7)	0–4	Burnley (5)
		Report	Goal

12 November 2017	Ashford Town (Middlesex) (7)	0–6	Milton Keynes Dons (4)	Stanwell
		Report	Hughes; Mallett; Hazard	Stadium: Robert Parker Stadium

12 November 2017	Bedworth United (5)	0–2	The New Saints (4)	Bedworth
		Report	Ridge 5', 90+5'	Stadium: The Oval; Attendance: 85

12 November 2017	Brighouse Town (4)	6–1	Chester-le-Street Town (4)	Brighouse
	Redgrave 10', 66'; Beresford 18', 45+1', 80'; Brown 70'	Report	Jones 53'	Stadium: St Giles Road; Attendance: 43

12 November 2017	Buckland Athletic (5)	1–4	Brislington (4)	Newton Abbot
	Goal	Report	Arkell 10', 78'; Vandries 19'; Maggs 75'	Stadium: Homers Heath

12 November 2017	Cambridge United (4)	0–1	Long Eaton United (4)	Mildenhall
		Report	Arber 35'	Stadium: Recreation Way; Attendance: 85

12 November 2017	Chesham United (5)	1–2 (a.e.t.)	New London Lionesses (7)	Chesham
	Adams	Report	Goal	Stadium: The Meadow

12 November 2017	Enfield Town (4)	3–2	Wymondham Town (6)	Enfield
	Goal	Report	Goal	Stadium: Queen Elizabeth II Stadium

12 November 2017	Farsley Celtic (5)	6–4 (a.e.t.)	West Didsbury & Chorlton (6)	Farsley
	Goal	Report	Goal	Stadium: Throstle Nest

12 November 2017	Harlow Town (6)	2–1	Royston Town (5)	Harlow
	Goal	Report	Goal	Stadium: The Harlow Arena; Attendance: 133

12 November 2017	Hull City (4)	4–1	Steel City Wanderers (4)	Kingston upon Hull
	Knight; Bell	Report	Wright 75'	Stadium: Hull University; Attendance: 80

12 November 2017	Ipswich Town (4)	4–2 (a.e.t.)	Leyton Orient (4)	Felixstowe
	Craddock-Ball; Gibbons; Welton; Foster	Report	Xidhas 86'	Stadium: Dellwood Avenue; Attendance: 65

12 November 2017	Larkhall Athletic (4)	2–3	Southampton (4)	Bath
	German; Hervey	Report	Bell-Jack; Yeates	Stadium: Palin Ham; Attendance: 40

12 November 2017	Liverpool Marshall Feds (4)	1–0	Bolton Wanderers (4)	Aigburth
	Mendes 112'	Report		Stadium: I.M. Marsh Campus; Attendance: 60

12 November 2017	Nettleham (5)	3–0	Loughborough Students (5)	Nettleham
	Goal	Report		Stadium: Mulsanne Park

12 November 2017	Newcastle United (4)	3–0	Sheffield United (4)	Newcastle upon Tyne
	42' (o.g.); McKenzie 49'; Lyons 82'	Report		Stadium: Newcastle University; Attendance: 110

12 November 2017	Norton & Stockton Ancients (5)	0–4	Chorley (4)	Stockton-on-Tees
		Report	Wood 19'; Coope 52'; Cullin 66'; Smith 75'	Stadium: Norton Sports Complex; Attendance: 70

12 November 2017	Plymouth Argyle (4)	W–O	Basingstoke Town (4)
		Report

12 November 2017	Redditch United (6)	2–4	Loughborough Foxes (4)	Redditch
	Goal	Report	Young 33', 37', 77'; Chambers 73'	Stadium: Valley Stadium

12 November 2017	Southampton Saints (4)	1–3	Keynsham Town (4)	Sholing
	Buckingham 23'	Report	Cook 27'; Bartlett 65'; Lorton 83'	Stadium: The Mortgage Decisions Stadium

12 November 2017	Sporting Khalsa (4)	5–1	Eastwood (5)	Wolverhampton
	Walker	Report	Goal	Stadium: University of Wolverhampton

12 November 2017	Stevenage (4)	4–1	Acle United (5)	Hertford
	Emmings; Littlechild; McGuigan; Makewell	Report	Goal	Stadium: Hertingfordbury Park; Attendance: 25

== Second round proper ==
Twenty four matches were scheduled for the second round proper. The 48 teams taking part consisted of 24 match winners from the previous round, plus the 24 teams from the FA Women's Premier League Northern and Southern Division exempted to this stage. Most matches were played on Sunday 3 December 2017, the only exception being Brighouse Town v Wolverhampton Wanderers which were postponed from the original scheduled date due to a waterlogged pitch, and then postponed again the following week due to safety concern following an Amber weather warning from the Met Office.

Number of teams per tier still in competition
WSL 1	WSL 2	Premier Division	Division One	Regional & County	Total
10 / 10	10 / 10	24 / 24	19 / 28	5 / 20	68 / 92

3 December 2017	AFC Wimbledon (4)	1–2	Portsmouth (3)	Sutton
	Asplund 7'	Report	Quayle 52'; Southgate 55'	Stadium: Gander Green Lane; Attendance: 90; Referee: Christian David

3 December 2017	Blackburn Rovers (3)	4–1	Loughborough Foxes (4)	Bamber Bridge
	Jordan 43', 53', 86'; McDonald 78'	Report	Cooper 71'	Stadium: Irongate; Attendance: 77

3 December 2017	Bradford City (3)	5–0	Long Eaton United (4)	Keighley
	Elford 48'; Campbell 50', 58'; White 64'; 72' (o.g.)	Report		Stadium: Cougar Park; Attendance: 26

3 December 2017	Brislington (4)	3–2	Swindon Town (3)	Brislington
	Arkell 60', 117'; Wardle 49'	Report	Barrett; Roberts	Stadium: Brislington Stadium; Attendance: 67

3 December 2017	Charlton Athletic (3)	5–0	Queens Park Rangers (3)	Thamesmead
	Gurr 45', 52', 67'; Dixson	Report		Stadium: Bayliss Avenue; Attendance: 66

3 December 2017	Chichester City (3)	4–2 (a.e.t.)	C&K Basildon (3)	Chichester
	Berrow; Blakely; Khassel; Lewry	Report	Addison; Rushen	Stadium: Oaklands Park; Attendance: 120

3 December 2017	Chorley (4)	0–3	Leicester City (3)	Euxton
		Report	Johnson 12'; Cudone 35', 53'	Stadium: Jim Fowler Memorial Ground; Attendance: 102

3 December 2017	Coventry United (3)	6–1	West Ham United (3)	Spon End
	Gauntlett 16'; Davies 54'; Hall 67'; Wilcox 70'; Dermody 76'; Cooper 84'	Report	Austin 52'	Stadium: Butts Park Arena

3 December 2017	Derby County (3)	1–1 (a.e.t.) (3–2 p)	Hull City (4)	Mickleover
	Ledgister	Report	Bell	Stadium: Station Road; Attendance: 77
	Penalties
	Penalty missed Penalty scored		Penalty missed Penalty scored

3 December 2017	Fylde (3)	2–0	Guiseley Vixens (3)	Medlar-with-Wesham
	Charlton; Davies	Report		Stadium: Mill Farm Sports Village; Attendance: 43

3 December 2017	Gillingham (3)	1–3 (a.e.t.)	Plymouth Argyle (4)	Chatham
	Keogh 33'	Report	Cunningham 2'; Knapman 12'; Wells 20'	Stadium: The Bauvill Stadium

3 December 2017	Huddersfield Town (3)	7–0	West Bromwich Albion (3)	Huddersfield
	Heckler-Biglin 34', 86'; Sanderson 45'; Danby 46', 69', 78'; Sowerby 67'	Report		Stadium: The Stafflex Arena; Attendance: 79

3 December 2017	Keynsham Town (4)	2–1	Southampton (4)	Keynsham
	Bartlett 18'; Lorton 82'	Report	Bell-Jack	Stadium: Crown Field

3 December 2017	Lewes (3)	7–0	Enfield Town (4)	Lewes
	Lane 4', 39', 60'; Carter 13'; Owen 45'; McIntyre 51'; Carleton 53'	Report		Stadium: The Dripping Pan; Attendance: 201

3 December 2017	Luton Town (4)	3–2 (a.e.t.)	Harlow Town (6)	Luton
	Goal	Report	Bassett 20', 88'	Stadium: Stockwood Park Athletics Stadium; Attendance: 51

3 December 2017	Middlesbrough (3)	8–1	Farsley Celtic (5)	Middlesbrough
	Bell 43'; Scarr 47', 62', 64'; Manders 76', 87'; Ownes 79', 82'	Report	Goal	Stadium: MFC Foundation; Attendance: 103

3 December 2017	Milton Keynes Dons (4)	0–1	Cardiff City (3)	Newport Pagnell
		Report	Turner 85'	Stadium: Willen Road; Attendance: 110

3 December 2017	Nettleham (5)	1–3	Liverpool Marshall Feds (4)	Nettleham
	Goal	Report	Longhurst 48'; Havelin 68'; Pope 83'	Stadium: Mulsanne Park

3 December 2017	New London Lionesses (7)	0–3	Crystal Palace (3)	Northwood
		Report	Chandler; Simmonds; Bryan	Stadium: Skyline Roofing Stadium

3 December 2017	Nottingham Forest (3)	0–2	Newcastle United (4)	Basford
		Report	McKenzie	Stadium: Greenwich Avenue

3 December 2017	Sporting Khalsa (4)	2–2 (a.e.t.) (1–4 p)	The New Saints (4)	Wolverhampton
	Goal	Report	Lewis 20'; Ridge 83'	Stadium: University of Wolverhampton; Attendance: 45
	Penalties
	Penalty scored Penalty missed		Penalty scored

3 December 2017	Stevenage (4)	1–1 (a.e.t.) (0–3 p)	Ipswich Town (4)	Hertford
	Makewell	Report	Thomas	Stadium: Hertingfordbury Park; Attendance: 80
	Penalties
	Penalty missed		Penalty scored

3 December 2017	Stoke City (3)	0–0 (a.e.t.) (1–4 p)	Burnley (5)	Smallthorne
		Report		Stadium: Norton Cricket Club & Miners Welfare Institute
	Penalties
	Penalty scored Penalty missed		Penalty scored

17 December 2017	Brighouse Town (4)	6–3	Wolverhampton Wanderers (3)	Brighouse
	Redgrave 4'; Brown 16', 61'; Doyle 58'; Beresford 82', 88'	Report	Criddle 2', 12', 50'	Stadium: St Giles Road; Attendance: 123

== Third round proper ==
Twelve matches were scheduled for the third round proper. Eleven matches were played on Sunday 7 January 2018, with Derby County v Brighouse Town postponed to the following week due to an unplayable pitch.

Number of teams per tier still in competition
WSL 1	WSL 2	Premier Division	Division One	Regional & County	Total
10 / 10	10 / 10	14 / 24	9 / 28	1 / 20	44 / 92

7 January 2018	Blackburn Rovers (3)	7–0	Portsmouth (3)	Skelmersdale
	Cunliffe 33'; Flint 36', 57', 72', 75'; Makin 45', 51'	Report		Stadium: JMO Sports Park

7 January 2018	Cardiff City (3)	3–2	Burnley (5)	Ystrad Mynach
	Williams 7', 86'; Powell 52'	Report	Goal	Stadium: CCB Centre for Sporting Excellence

7 January 2018	Chichester City (3)	2–0	Luton Town (4)	Chichester
	Collighan 85'; Khassel 89'	Report		Stadium: Oaklands Park; Attendance: 100

7 January 2018	Crystal Palace (3)	1–1 (a.e.t.) (2–3 p)	Coventry United (3)	Chislehurst
	Whinnet 58'	Report	Dermody 7'	Stadium: Foxbury Avenue
	Penalties
	Bryan (penalty scored); Sherwood (penalty missed); Holdaway (penalty scored); Chandler (penalty missed); McRoberts (penalty missed)		(penalty missed) Wilcox; (penalty scored) Haigh; (penalty scored) Brook; (penalty scored) Hall

7 January 2018	Fylde (3)	1–3	Plymouth Argyle (4)	Preston
	Merrin	Report	Knapman 4', 43'; Pollock 35'	Stadium: University of Central Lancashire Sports Arena; Attendance: 58

7 January 2018	Huddersfield Town (3)	1–2	Lewes (3)	Huddersfield
	Sanderson 61'	Report	Carter 59'; McIntyre 80'	Stadium: Stafflex Arena; Attendance: 96

7 January 2018	Ipswich Town (4)	2–5 (a.e.t.)	Charlton Athletic (3)	Felixstowe
	Craddock 47', 74'	Report	Gurr 69'; Graham 73', 98'; Pittuck 99'; Lee 116'	Stadium: Dellwood Avenue; Attendance: 110

7 January 2018	Keynsham Town (4)	8–1	Brislington (4)	Keynsham
	Bartlett 12', 21', 27', 72'; Lorton 42'; Vega 78'	Report	Goal	Stadium: Crown Field; Attendance: 70

7 January 2018	Leicester City (3)	2–1	Bradford City (3)	Quorn
	Axten; Dugmore	Report	White 9'	Stadium: Farley Way Stadium; Attendance: 78

7 January 2018	Middlesbrough (3)	4–3 (a.e.t.)	Liverpool Marshall Feds (4)	Thornaby-on-Tees
	Owens 43'; Scarr 72', 120+4'; Ashenhurst 90+4'	Report	Rowe 4'; Bartup 11', 83'	Stadium: Teesdale Park; Attendance: 113

7 January 2018	Newcastle United (4)	1–2	The New Saints (4)	Newcastle upon Tyne
	Ord 59'	Report	Bebbington 10'; Ridge 76'	Stadium: Newcastle University; Attendance: 153; Referee: Adam Nichol

14 January 2018	Derby County (3)	1–3	Brighouse Town (4)	Mickleover
	Giampalma 42'	Report	Redgrave 7', 55'; Cass 90'	Stadium: Station Road; Attendance: 120

== Fourth round proper ==
Sixteen matches were scheduled for the fourth round proper. The 32 teams taking part consists of 12 match winners from the previous round, plus the 10 FA WSL 1 and 10 FA WSL 2 teams exempted to this stage. Fifteen matches were played on Sunday 4 February 2018, with Plymouth Argyle v Leicester City Women postponed to the following week due to an unplayable pitch.

Number of teams per tier still in competition
WSL 1	WSL 2	Premier Division	Division One	Regional & County	Total
10 / 10	10 / 10	8 / 24	4 / 28	0 / 20	32 / 92

4 February 2018	Aston Villa (2)	4–0	Middlesbrough (3)	Tamworth
	Salmon 4', 37'; Ejupi 27', 48'	Report		Stadium: The Lamb Ground

4 February 2018	Blackburn Rovers (3)	2–3 (a.e.t.)	Charlton Athletic (3)	Bamber Bridge
	Flint 55', 81'	Report	Taylor 47' (o.g.); Gurr 73'; Griffin 100'	Stadium: Irongate; Attendance: 157

4 February 2018	Brighton & Hove Albion (2)	0–2	Manchester City (1)	Lancing
		Report	Christiansen 45'; Emslie 66'	Stadium: Culver Road; Attendance: 1,372; Referee: Michael Lowe

4 February 2018	Cardiff City (3)	0–0 (5–4 p)	Oxford United (2)	Ystrad Mynach
		Report		Stadium: CCB Centre for Sporting Excellence
	Penalties
	Llewellyn (penalty scored); Mills (penalty scored); Poole (penalty scored); Powell (penalty scored); Williams (penalty scored)		Penalty scored Penalty missed

4 February 2018	Durham (2)	2–1	Sheffield (2)	Durham
	Hepple 59'; Robson 73'	Report	Johnson 47'	Stadium: New Ferens Park; Attendance: 244

4 February 2018	Everton (1)	3–1	Bristol City (1)	Crosby
	Chance 52', 83'; Brougham 56'	Report	Arthur 7'	Stadium: Rossett Park; Attendance: 712

4 February 2018	Keynsham Town (4)	0–3	Lewes (3)	Keynsham
		Report	Amy Taylor 40'; Bridges 58'; Kempson 63'	Stadium: Crown Field

4 February 2018	Liverpool (1)	5–0	Watford (2)	Thornton
	Johnson 7'; Weir 19'; England 22', 63'; Harris 29'	Report		Stadium: LCFA Sefton; Attendance: 262

4 February 2018	London Bees (2)	0–10	Chelsea (1)	Edgware
		Report	Cuthbert 20', 83', 89'; Ji 22'; Lea 30' (o.g.); Kirby 47', 68'; Chapman 74', 90'; Bright 78'	Stadium: The Hive Stadium; Attendance: 486; Referee: Andreas Anastasiou

4 February 2018	Millwall Lionesses (2)	4–1	Coventry United (3)	Rotherhithe
	Goal	Report	Dermody 85'	Stadium: St Pauls Sports Ground

4 February 2018	Reading (1)	0–1	Birmingham City (1)	High Wycombe
		Report	Ewers 34'	Stadium: Adams Park

4 February 2018	Sunderland (1)	13–0	Brighouse Town (4)	South Shields
	Bruinenberg 6', 27'; Galloway 20'; Sharp 35', 84'; Staniforth 62', 68', 80'; Lambert 69', 76', 85'; Joice 72'; Gibson 82'	Report		Stadium: Mariners Park; Referee: Christopher Keightley

4 February 2018	The New Saints (4)	1–1 (4–5 p)	Chichester City (3)	Oswestry
	Goal	Report	Khassel	Stadium: Park Hall; Attendance: 272
	Penalties
	Penalty scored Penalty missed		Penalty scored

4 February 2018	Tottenham Hotspur (2)	0–3	Doncaster Rovers Belles (2)	Cheshunt
		Report	Walton 2'; Simpkins 45'; Rayner 90'	Stadium: Theobalds Lane

4 February 2018	Yeovil Town (1)	0–3	Arsenal (1)	Weston-super-Mare
		Report	Nobbs 10'; Mead 45+2'; Miles 59' (o.g.)	Stadium: Woodspring Stadium; Attendance: 323; Referee: Daniel Lamport

11 February 2018	Plymouth Argyle (4)	2–3	Leicester City (3)	Plymouth
	Knapman 49'; Middleton 90'	Report	Greengrass 13'; Axten 59'; Dugmore 90'	Stadium: Haye Road; Attendance: 208

== Fifth round proper ==
Eight matches were scheduled for the fifth round proper. All eight matches were played on Sunday 18 February 2018.

Number of teams per tier still in competition
WSL 1	WSL 2	Premier Division	Division One	Regional & County	Total
7 / 10	4 / 10	5 / 24	0 / 28	0 / 20	16 / 92

18 February 2018	Arsenal (1)	1–0	Millwall Lionesses (2)	Borehamwood
	Mead 32'	Report		Stadium: Meadow Park (2)

18 February 2018	Birmingham City (1)	1–3 (a.e.t.)	Manchester City (1)	Solihull
	White 37'	Report	Nadim 13'; Stanway 97'; Emslie 119'	Stadium: Damson Park; Attendance: 641; Referee: Wayne Cartmel

18 February 2018	Cardiff City (3)	1–3	Charlton Athletic (3)	Cardiff
	Pepper 53' (o.g.)	Report	Graham 23', 29'; Gurr 32'	Stadium: CCB Centre for Sporting Excellence

18 February 2018	Chelsea (1)	6–0	Doncaster Rovers Belles (2)	Kingston upon Thames
	Ji 12'; Kirby 49'; Spence 53'; Cuthbert 66', 88'; Bachmann 79'	Report		Stadium: Kingsmeadow; Attendance: 1,564

18 February 2018	Chichester City (3)	0–3	Liverpool (1)	Chichester
		Report	Babajide 34'; Hodson 39'; England 47'	Stadium: Oaklands Park; Attendance: 1,300

18 February 2018	Durham (2)	5–2	Leicester City (3)	Durham
	Ness 13'; Christon 25'; Cottam 43', 63'; Roberts 83'	Report	Dugmore 42'; Domingo 45'	Stadium: New Ferens Park; Attendance: 227

18 February 2018	Lewes (3)	0–6	Everton (1)	Lewes
		Report	Boye-Hlorkah 8', 19', 40'; Kelly 12'; Turner 69'; Finnigan 89'	Stadium: The Dripping Pan; Attendance: 975

18 February 2018	Sunderland (1)	3–2	Aston Villa (2)	South Shields
	Williams 5'; Pitman 79'; Ramshaw 84'	Report	Salmon 24', 57'	Stadium: Mariners Park; Referee: Paul Brown

== Quarter-finals ==
The four matches of the quarter-finals were scheduled to be played on Sunday 18 March 2018 but only one was completed on this date, with the other three postponed till the following week.

Number of teams per tier still in competition
WSL 1	WSL 2	Premier Division	Division One	Regional & County	Total
6 / 10	1 / 10	1 / 24	0 / 28	0 / 20	8 / 92

25 March 2018	Sunderland (1)	2–4 (a.e.t.)	Manchester City (1)	South Shields
	Williams 33'; Staniforth 77'	Report	Stokes 73'; Ross 90', 97'; Toone 114'	Stadium: Mariners Park; Attendance: 552; Referee: Dean Hulme

18 March 2018	Liverpool (1)	0–3	Chelsea (1)	Prescot
		Report	Andersson 21'; Chapman 45'; Mjelde 58'	Stadium: Valerie Park; Attendance: 358

25 March 2018	Durham (2)	1–6	Everton (1)	Durham
	Robson 68'	Report	Sweetman-Kirk 15', 55', 63'; Chance 42'; Turner 58'; Brett 90'	Stadium: New Ferens Park; Attendance: 502

25 March 2018	Arsenal (1)	5–0	Charlton Athletic (3)	Borehamwood
	Little 4' (pen.); O'Reilly 56'; Miedema 60'; Carter 85'; Nobbs 90'	Report		Stadium: Meadow Park; Referee: Paul Forrester

== Semi-finals ==
Number of teams per tier still in competition
WSL 1	WSL 2	Premier Division	Division One	Regional & County	Total
4 / 10	0 / 10	0 / 24	0 / 28	0 / 20	4 / 92

15 April 2018	Everton (1)	1–2	Arsenal (1)	Crosby
12:30 BST (UTC+01:00)	Kelly 67' (pen.)	Report	Carter 25'; Quinn 90+1'	Stadium: Rossett Park; Attendance: 1,457; Referee: Abigail Marriott

15 April 2018	Chelsea (1)	2–0	Manchester City (1)	Kingston upon Thames
15:30 BST (UTC+01:00)	Kirby 5', 74'	Report		Stadium: Kingsmeadow; Attendance: 3,048; Referee: Sarah Garratt

== Final ==
5 May 2018
17:30 BST

Arsenal	1–3	Chelsea
Miedema 73'	Report	Bachmann 48', 60'; Kirby 76'

Wembley Stadium, London
Attendance: 45,423
Referee: Lindsey Robinson (Durham)

== Television rights ==
Round	BBC	Ref.
Semi-finals	Everton v Arsenal (BBC Red Button); Chelsea vs Manchester City (BBC Two)	
Final	Arsenal v Chelsea (BBC One)	
