= 2016 FA Cup =

2016 FA Cup may refer to:

- 2015–16 FA Cup
  - 2016 FA Cup final
- 2015–16 FA Women's Cup
  - 2016 FA Women's Cup final
- 2016–17 FA Cup
- 2016–17 FA Women's Cup
