= 2016 Women's FA Cup final =

English football cup final

- The match programme cover
- Event: 2015–16 Women's FA Cup
Arsenal	Chelsea
1	0
- Date: 14 May 2016
- Venue: Wembley Stadium, London
- Player of the Match: Danielle Carter (Arsenal)
- Referee: Sarah Garratt (Birmingham)
- Attendance: 32,912

The 2016 Women's FA Cup final was the 46th final of the Women's FA Cup, England's primary cup competition for women's football teams. The showpiece event was the 23rd to be played directly under the auspices of the Football Association (FA) and was named the SSE Women's FA Cup Final for sponsorship reasons. The final was contested between Arsenal Ladies and Chelsea Ladies on 14 May 2016 at Wembley Stadium in London. The match was the second FA Women's Cup Final to be held at Wembley.

Chelsea, managed by Emma Hayes, went into the match as defending champions, having won the 2015 FA Cup, while Arsenal, managed by Pedro Martínez Losa, had won the competition on thirteen previous occasions. But Chelsea were favourites to lift the trophy as Arsenal had enjoyed only moderate success since their victory at the 2014 Cup Final, and had been beaten by Chelsea in a match earlier in the 2016 season of the Women's Super League. Arsenal won the match 1–0, with a first-half goal from Danielle Carter scored in the eighteenth minute, and securing the team their fourteenth FA Cup victory. Carter was also named Player of the Match. The match was attended by a crowd of 32,912, an increase on the 30,710 who attended the 2015 final.

The match was refereed by Sarah Garratt of the Birmingham Football Association, whose appointment was announced by the Football Association on 5 May. The match saw Garratt taking charge of her first FA Cup Final.

== Match details ==
14 May 2016
14:00 BST

Arsenal	1–0	Chelsea
Carter 18'	Report

Wembley Stadium, London
Attendance: 32,912
Referee: Sarah Garratt (Birmingham)

Arsenal	Chelsea

GK	13	(Netherlands) Sari van Veenendaal
DF	2	(England) Alex Scott (c)
DF	5	(England) Casey Stoney
DF	22	(Germany) Josephine Henning
DF	3	(England) Emma Mitchell
MF	8	(England) Jordan Nobbs
MF	4	(England) Fara Williams		(substituted off) 74'
MF	6	(Spain) Vicky Losada
MF	9	(England) Danielle Carter
FW	10	(England) Kelly Smith		(substituted off) 74'
FW	24	(Nigeria) Asisat Oshoala	(yellow card) 82'	(substituted off) 89'
Substitutes:
DF	20	(Netherlands) Dominique Janssen		(substituted on) 74'
MF	21	(Netherlands) Daniëlle van de Donk		(substituted on) 74'
MF	14	(England) Leah Williamson		(substituted on) 89'
GK	1	(Republic of Ireland) Emma Byrne
FW	7	(Spain) Natalia Pablos
Manager:
(Spain) Pedro Martínez Losa

GK	1	(Sweden) Hedvig Lindahl
DF	3	(England) Hannah Blundell
DF	4	(England) Millie Bright		(substituted off) 79'
DF	5	(England) Gilly Flaherty
DF	16	(Portugal) Ana Borges
MF	24	(England) Drew Spence		(substituted off) 46'
MF	17	(England) Katie Chapman (c)
MF	7	(England) Gemma Davison
MF	10	(South Korea) Ji So-yun
FW	8	(England) Karen Carney		(substituted off) 55'
FW	14	(England) Fran Kirby
Substitutes:
FW	15	Bethany England	(yellow card) 84'	(substituted on) 79'
DF	6	(Republic of Ireland) Niamh Fahey		(substituted on) 46'
FW	9	(England) Eniola Aluko		(substituted on) 55'
GK	12	(Jamaica) Rebecca Spencer
DF	11	(England) Claire Rafferty
Manager:
(England) Emma Hayes

Player of the match
Danielle Carter (Arsenal)

Assistant referees:
Lisa Rashid
Lindsey Robinson
Fourth official:
Lucy Oliver

Match rules

- 90 minutes.
- 30 minutes of extra-time if necessary.
- Penalty shoot-out if scores still level.
- Five named substitutes.
- Maximum of three substitutions.
