= Ashvir Singh Johal =

English football coach (born 1995)

Personal information
- Date of birth: 29 March 1995 (age 31)
- Place of birth: Leicester, England

Team information
- Current team: Mumbai City

Senior career*
Years	Team	Apps	(Gls)
- GNG

Managerial career
- 2025–2026: Morecambe
- 2026–: Mumbai City
- * Club domestic league appearances and goals

Ashvir Singh Johal (born 29 March 1995) is an English professional football coach who is the head of Indian Super League club Mumbai City.

He began coaching at Leicester City, working up to under-18 level in the academy. He then held roles at Wigan Athletic, Como and Notts County, before being named head coach at Morecambe in August 2025. He became the youngest manager in England's top five divisions, and the first Sikh to lead a professional English club.

== Career ==
=== Early career ===
Born in Leicester, Singh Johal was a player and coach of Leicester-based club GNG, a non-league team affiliated with the local gurdwara. He spent 10 years at Leicester City, beginning at development centres and community projects before coaching in the academy, up to under-18 level. He praised head coach Brendan Rodgers as an influence on his career.

In December 2022, Singh Johal moved to Wigan Athletic as a first-team coach under Kolo Touré, a fellow former employee of Rodgers at Leicester. His first match was away to Millwall, who congratulated him as the first Sikh on a coaching team in the English Football League. Touré, Singh Johal and fellow coach Kevin Betsy were dismissed less than two months later, with the team last in the table. Singh Johal was assistant to Cesc Fàbregas at Italian club Como's under-19 team in 2023. He was then the B-team head coach at Notts County.

=== Morecambe ===
In August 2025, newly relegated National League club Morecambe had been suspended from the start of the season for financial reasons, and were at risk of dissolution. Morecambe were taken over by the Panjab Warriors consortium, becoming the first British professional club to be owned by Sikhs. The new owners sacked Derek Adams as manager and brought in Singh Johal on 19 August. At 30, he became the youngest manager in the top five divisions of English football, as well as the first Sikh to lead a professional football club in England.

Singh Johal added 12 players to a squad that had only featured five players before his appointment. Morecambe's suspension was lifted and they hosted Altrincham on 23 August, winning 2–1 with the winner coming in the eighth minute of added time, but the side then lost their next four games. Singh Johal left Morecambe in January 2026, after five wins in 28 league games.

=== Mumbai City ===
On 14 November 2026, Indian Super League club Mumbai City announced the appointment of Singh Johal as head coach on a contract until the end of the 2026–27 season. His debut six days later was a 2–0 loss away to Bengaluru.

== Personal life ==
Singh Johal is a Sikh and wears a patka head covering. He is of Punjabi descent from India.

== Managerial statistics ==
Matches played as of 20 November 2026

Managerial record by team and tenure
Team	From	To	Record				
Team	From	To	P	W	D	L	Win %
Morecambe	19 August 2025	30 January 2026	32	6	7	19	18.8
Mumbai City	14 November 2026	Present	1	0	0	1	0.0
Total			33	6	7	20	18.18

== See also ==
- British Asians in association football
