= Morecambe F.C. financial crisis =

Morecambe F.C. financial problems, 2022–2025

Morecambe Football Club's financial crisis extended from late 2022 to the summer of 2025 as club owner, Bond Group Investments, tried to sell the club. Having been promoted to EFL League One in 2021, financial problems prevented any further progress and in May 2023 the club was relegated back to League Two after two seasons. By this time, financial problems had been publicly shared in October 2022 after Bond Group put the club up for sale. Through 2023 and 2024, players and staff were repeatedly paid late, and the club struggled to settle debts owed to HM Revenue and Customs (HMRC), with the club subject to transfer embargoes and fines. Despite claims that a sale of the club was imminent, by January 2025 Morecambe had no funds for the rest of the season, was unable to sign players in the transfer window, and the club were relegated to the National League at the end of the 2024–25 season.

While a sale of the club to a sports investment company, Panjab Warriors, was approved by the EFL in early June 2025, Bond Group's Jason Whittingham delayed the deal. When administration loomed in early July after non-payment of staff wages, Whittingham sacked the club's directors, then claimed that a new buyer was set to take over the club. This deal was never sealed, and as players and staff again went unpaid, the club was placed under a registration embargo by the National League for breaching financial regulations, and in late July was then suspended by the National League, with the side's first three League fixtures postponed. The club was given until 20 August 2025 to resolve the situation but football operations ceased and players left to join other clubs. The ownership crisis was discussed in Parliament with both the culture secretary Lisa Nandy and UK prime minister Sir Keir Starmer urging all concerned with the club to ensure its survival. Six weeks of sometimes acrimonious claims and counter-claims between Panjab Warriors and Whittingham's Bond Group eventually concluded with an agreement announced on 14 August, enabling the club to avoid a HMRC winding-up petition, appoint new directors, pay staff and players, and expand a remaining squad of five contracted players by recruiting 12 new players ahead of the side's first National League fixture on 23 August 2025.

== Background ==
Morecambe played their first Football League game in August 2007, and retained their EFL League Two status with mid-table finishes through to the 2009–10 season when they qualified for the play-offs, but lost 7–2 on aggregate to Dagenham & Redbridge. The side finished seasons in the lower half of the table through to May 2018 when the club was sold to Bond Group Investments.

In the 2020–21 season, following the COVID-19 pandemic, Morecambe again qualified for the League Two play-offs, and, after beating Tranmere Rovers in the semi-final, the club beat Newport County 1–0 in the 2021 League Two play-off final on 31 May 2021, earning the Shrimps promotion to League One, the third tier of English football, for the first time in their history. Under manager Derek Adams, the club flirted with relegation, but ultimately finished 19th and retained League One status for a second season.

== Financial problems ==
In October 2022, Adams voiced worries about the future of the club. Its owners, Bond Group Investments, had put the club up for sale in September 2022, with directors Jason Whittingham and Colin Goldring (both associated with the collapse of Worcester Warriors rugby union club, and both fined and disqualified from being company directors following a court hearing on 18 October 2022) stepping down from the Shrimps' board. In March 2023, players' wages were paid late, with funds invested by Sarbjot Johal, who was aiming to take over the club, ultimately bridging the gap. However, uncertainty about the club's ownership continued, ultimately through to August 2025.

In May 2023, Morecambe were relegated to League Two after a defeat by Exeter City, and 14 players were set to leave the club after their contracts expired, with no players offered new deals. In August 2023, Morecambe received a suspended three-point deduction for paying its players late in March. In December 2023, Morecambe and owner Jason Whittingham were charged by the EFL for failures over players' wages, and in April 2024, the three-point deduction was activated and Whittingham was fined £10,000. The club finished the 2023–24 season in 15th place.

On 30 April 2024, after succeeding Derek Adams as manager in November 2023, Ged Brannan left the financially troubled club to join League Two rivals Accrington Stanley. Manager-less, with chief executive Ben Sadler joining Walsall, and with only one player under contract for the next season due to an ongoing transfer embargo, the club was described as "a circus" by its chairman Rod Taylor in May 2024. On 20 May 2024, Morecambe announced the departure of 16 players, leaving the club with a five-strong first-team squad. The following day, club directors called on Whittingham to sell the club to avoid a 'catastrophic outcome'. Derek Adams returned for a third spell as manager in early June 2024, when Whittingham said the club was talking to four potential buyers. In early July 2024, talks over a possible buyout of the club were reported to be at "an advanced stage", the transfer embargo was lifted (though Morecambe were fined £5,131.82 for failing to meet payment obligations) and Morecambe signed 15 players.

On 19 December 2024, Morecambe received a suspended two-points deduction for five failures to report non-payment of accounts owed to HM Revenue and Customs (HMRC). On 23 January 2025, the club - 23rd in League Two and five points from safety - insisted it was "not in immediate jeopardy" despite having no proof of funds for the rest of the season and being unable to sign players in the transfer window. However, Morecambe later secured funds to sign players. Whittingham said "With every fibre in my body ... I can't wait to get out of Morecambe. ... I no longer want to be the owner of the club".

== 2025: Return to Non-League, and an ownership crisis ==
On 21 April 2025, after 18 years in the Football League, Morecambe were relegated to the National League at the end of the 2024–25 season, following a home defeat to Salford City. Club directors subsequently reported "positive progress" towards the sale of the club, and a deal with Panjab Warriors, a sports investment company, was approved by the EFL in early June. But the Bond Group was later said to be "considering reneging" on the deal - despite Panjab having already paid £3.8m to Bond Group, plus £630,000 to clear loans, and an interest-free loan of £1.7m to meet the club's monthly working capital needs. More than six weeks of claims and counter-claims between Panjab Warriors and Whittingham's Bond Group followed.

After two-thirds of June's staff wages were not paid by Bond Group, directors planned to put the club into administration on 2 July 2025 if the club was not sold to new owners, but Whittingham - declaring the club to be in "at a crisis point" - started to dismiss the directors to give time for the club to avoid administration (the directors later all resigned; a UK limited company cannot legally operate without at least one director). With completion of a sale to Panjab Warriors expected on 7 July the directors were invited to resume their positions, and initially accepted but delayed their reappointment until conclusion of the sale. This was delayed by Whittingham. Panjab Warriors said he was using the club "as leverage in unrelated personal financial matters." Local MP Lizzi Collinge said "Morecambe FC is being held hostage.… The likes of Jason Whittingham should never have been allowed to buy a football club."

On 9 July, Whittingham said a "last minute" deal with a new UK buyer had been agreed, prompting Panjab Warriors to threaten legal action and call for any alternative deal to be blocked until the dispute was resolved. The club was also placed under a registration embargo by the National League for breaching financial regulations. The Guardian reported the club could be banned from playing its first game back in the National League, with players allowed to leave for nothing if they were not paid by Friday 18 July. On 18 July, Whittingham said the new owner - a consortium led by an investor called Jonny Cato - would complete the sale that day and would pay staff and players. The sale was not concluded and Panjab Warriors started legal action against Whittingham and Bond Group. The Shrimps Trust said players were refusing to play until the ownership situation was resolved. On 23 July 2025, a minority group of club shareholders warned Bond Group: sell the club within 48 hours or face High Court action. On 25 July, the National League said it had "serious concerns", and had written to Whittingham to outline terms to be met by 12 noon on 28 July. Its Club Compliance and Licensing Committee would then meet to discuss the matter and possible further sanctions. On 27 July, Whittingham said "continual negative press statements" had given the Cato consortium "cause for concern and pause", and said Bond Group had unsuccessfully attempted to renew contact with Panjab Warriors.

=== Suspension from National League and cessation of first team operations ===
On 28 July 2025, the National League's committee said Morecambe's league membership had been suspended, with the side's first three League fixtures postponed. The committee would meet again on 20 August to "determine if outstanding items have been satisfied, and to decide the Club's ability to retain Membership in the Competition". Club staff were reportedly unpaid for a second successive month. On 29 July, Panjab Warriors said they were "ready, willing and able" to buy Morecambe. In a joint statement with minority shareholders, the Shrimps Trust and Lizzi Collinge, they said the National League was ready to sanction the deal and "immediately lift the suspension and embargo should it be agreed". A 30 July statement from the group announced the club's first team had stopped all football operations due to a lack of insurance cover. Some players had left the club, with others set to leave. On 31 July, a third statement said the club's academy would close on 1 August (academy manager Neil Wainwright said it was being "paused"), and the club would close on 4 August unless Whittingham signed the deal "immediately". On 1 August, Whittingham said he was still working toward a successful sale of the club. Without a sale, liquidation was considered the most likely outcome.

On 1 August, culture secretary Lisa Nandy joined those urging Whittingham to sell the club; adding the new independent football regulator would come too late to help Morecambe's situation. On 6 August, UK prime minister Sir Keir Starmer urged all concerned with the club to "do the right thing".

On 8 August 2025, Panjab claimed Whittingham had cancelled a scheduled 7 August mediation session; the mediator withdrew citing Bond Group's "complete lack of sincerity and commitment". On 11 August, Whittingham claimed "Panjab Warriors ... continue to issue statements that bear no relevance to actual events", talked of a new mediation meeting on 13 August, and accused MPs and others of making "uninformed statements for their own self-promotion" without trying to contact Bond Group. The Shrimps Trust condemned "another empty meaningless statement".

=== Panjab Warriors takeover ===
On 14 August 2025, Bond Group and Panjab Warriors announced an agreement in principle over a takeover. The same day, HMRC issued a winding-up order against the club. On 17 August, the National League said the suspension would be lifted once paperwork was received regarding the sale to Panjab Warriors; the transfer embargo would also remain in place until all football creditors, including players, staff and HMRC, had been paid. Two new club directors were also appointed.

On 18 August 2025, staff received the balance of their June 2025 wages. A club statement said it would pay all its remaining liabilities, including outstanding July wages and HMRC debts by 20 August. The new owners also sacked manager Derek Adams, appointing Ashvir Singh Johal as his replacement on 19 August. He took on a side with just five contracted players. On 20 August, Morecambe confirmed their opening fixture against Altrincham would go ahead on 23 August, and said the transfer embargo had been lifted, allowing the club to sign players. Twelve new players were signed ahead of the Altrincham game, which Morecambe won 2–1, though the side then lost their next four games.

=== Aftermath ===
Between 27 February and 18 March 2026, the National League placed Morecambe under a transfer embargo over a disputed payment to former owners Bond Group Investments. Also in March 2026, the club was served with a winding-up petition by a supplier, KPM Groundworks Limited, relating to a debt incurred prior to the Panjab Warriors takeover. The debt was later settled. In July 2026, Morecambe received a warning notice from the Independent Football Regulator after failing to respond to requests about the running of the club - the first time the IFR has taken action since the Football Governance Act came into force in July 2025 - and in August, the club and its owners were officially reprimanded by the IFR "for failing to provide a timely and complete response to information requirements". Also in August 2026, Morecambe was placed under a temporary transfer embargo by the National League for late submission of budgetary information.
