= Halesowen Town F.C. =

Association football club in England

Coordinates: 52°27′14″N 2°03′28″W

Halesowen Town
- Full name: Halesowen Town Football Club
- Nicknames: The Yeltz, Yeltzers
- Founded: 1870s
- Ground: The Grove, Halesowen
- Capacity: 3,150 (525 seated)
- Owner: Keith McKenna
- Chairman: Keith McKenna
- Manager: Paul Holleran (interim)
- League: Southern League Premier Division Central
- 2025–26: Southern League Premier Division Central, 5th of 22
- Website: ht-fc.co.uk
Home colours	Away colours	Third colours

Halesowen Town Football Club is a football club based in Halesowen, West Midlands, England. They are currently members of the Southern League Premier Division Central and play at the Grove Recreation Ground.

== History ==
The club was believed to have been established around 1873, but recent research has suggested it was probably formed in 1877 under the name Halesowen Football Club. They played on three different pitches before moving to their present home, the Grove, ca. 1881. The team joined the Birmingham & District League in 1892, finishing bottom in their first season. They finished bottom of the league again in 1904–05 and were relegated to the Walsall & District League. After only one season, they returned to the Birmingham & District League in 1906. Another last-place finish in 1910–11 saw the club transfer to the Birmingham Combination. They finished bottom of the new league for the next two seasons and left after finishing second-from-bottom in 1913–14. The team then moved into the Birmingham Youth & Old Boys Football Association Suburban League Division One, an amateur league where youth football continued through the war.

Halesowen rejoined the Birmingham Combination in 1919 and were incorporated under the name Halesowen Town around 1926. They finished bottom of the league in 1926–27 but remained members of the competition until 1939. In 1946 they rejoined the Birmingham & District League and won their first-ever league title in 1946–47. In 1954 the league split into Northern and Southern divisions, with Halesowen placed in the Southern section. Further league reorganisation saw them become members of Division One the following season. In 1955–56 the club reached the first round of the FA Cup for the first time, losing 4–2 at home to Hendon in front of a record crowd of 5,000. However, after finishing in the bottom three the following season, they were relegated to Division Two.

A third-place finish in 1957–58 saw Halesowen promoted back to Division One. In 1960 the league reverted to a single division and in 1962 it was renamed the West Midlands (Regional) League. The club were runners-up in 1964–65, and were placed in the Premier Division when the league gained a second tier at the end of the season. In 1982–83 they were Premier Division champions, also reaching the FA Vase final, losing 1–0 to VS Rugby at Wembley. They went on to retain the title for the next three seasons, and reached the final of the FA Vase again in 1985 and 1986, winning on both occasions; in the 1984–85 final they beat Fleetwood Town 3–1 and in 1985–86 they won 3–0 against Southall. The 1985–86 season also saw the club reach the first round of the FA Cup for the second time, eventually losing 3–1 to Frickley Athletic in a replay. After their fourth consecutive title in 1985–86 the club moved up to the Midland Division of the Southern League.

Halesowen made further appearances in the first round of the FA Cup in 1987–88 and again in 1988–89 when they played Football League opposition for the first time, losing 2–0 at Brentford. They won the Midland Division in 1989–90, earning promotion to the Premier Division, with another FA Cup first round appearance ending in a 1–0 defeat at Cardiff City. They went on to meet Tranmere Rovers in the first round in 1990–91, losing 2–1, and Farnborough Town in 1991–92, losing 4–0 in a replay.

Halesowen were Premier Division runners-up in 1995–96, missing out on the title and promotion to the Football Conference by three points. However, the early 2000s saw the club yo-yo between the divisions; in 2000–01 they finished bottom of the Premier Division and were relegated to the Western Division. The following season saw them return to the Premier Division as the first opportunity as they won the Western Division. An immediate relegation back to the Western Division at the end of the 2002–03 season was followed by another immediate promotion back to the Premier Division. In 2004–05 another FA Cup first round appearance ended with a 2–1 defeat at Yeading. In 2007–08 the club finished third in the Premier Division, qualifying for the promotion play-offs; after beating Chippenham Town 2–1 in the semi-finals, they lost 2–1 to Team Bath in the final.

The 2010–11 season saw Halesowen finish bottom of the Premier Division, resulting in relegation to Division One South & West. In 2012 they were transferred to Division One South of the Northern Premier League, which they won in 2013–14, earning promotion to the league's Premier Division. The club were transferred to the Premier Central division of the Southern League at the end of the 2017–18 season as part of the restructuring of the non-League pyramid. At the end of the 2020–21 season they were transferred to Division One Midlands of the Northern Premier League. In 2022–23 the club were runners-up in Division One Midlands, qualifying for the play-offs. After beating Coleshill Town 3–1 in the semi-finals, they defeated Spalding United 2–1 after extra time in the final to earn promotion to the Premier Division Central of the Southern League. In 2024–25 the club finished fourth in the Premier Division Central, before losing 3–2 to AFC Telford United in the play-off semi-finals. They finished fifth in 2025–26, going on to lose 1–0 to Spalding United in the play-off semi-finals.

== Ground ==
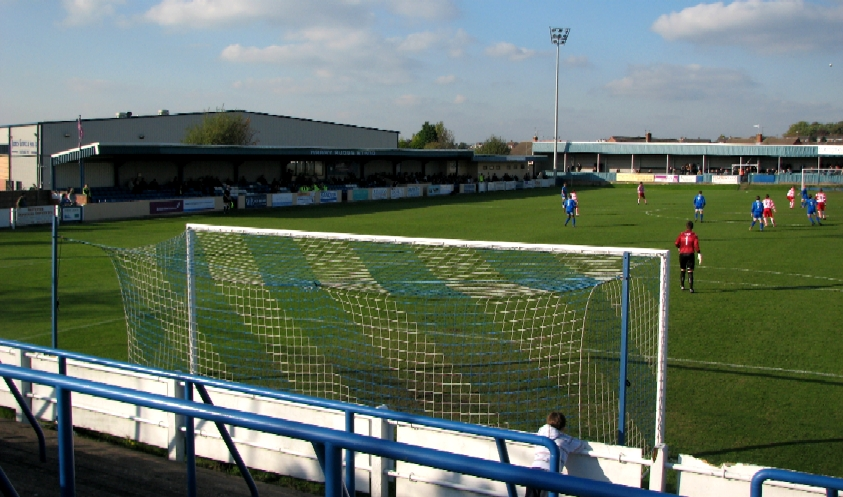
The Grove

Halesowen played on at least three different grounds in the late 1870s before moving to the Stourbridge Road Ground, now known as the Grove, around 1881. The ground was used for cricket and was three-sided for many years. A small stand behind the top goals and a cricket pavilion were built in the 1920s. Before this, the players would change in the Waggon & Horses pub on Stourbridge Road. In 1934 another small wooden stand was constructed along the perimeter of the James Grove Button Factory. During the 1950s, the Shed end was constructed along with changing rooms, built on the site of the old cricket pavilion.

In the 1980s the three-sided ground was converted to four with the addition of uncovered terracing along the Recreation Park side. In 1987, the 420-seat Harry Rudge Stand was completed on the site of the 1930s wooden stand; it was extended in 1998 and again in 2000. The floodlights which the club won in 1983 lasted until 2001, when a new set were installed and officially inaugurated at a friendly match against Wolverhampton Wanderers.

== Honours ==
- Southern League
  - Midland Division champions 1989–90
  - Western Division champions 2001–02
- Northern Premier League
  - Division One South champions 2013–14
- West Midlands (Regional) League
  - Champions 1946–47, 1982–83, 1983–84, 1984–85, 1985–86
- FA Vase
  - Winners 1984–85, 1985–86
- Birmingham Senior Cup
  - Winners 1983–84, 1997–98
- Staffordshire Senior Cup
  - Winners 1988–89
- Worcestershire Senior Cup
  - Winners 1951–52, 1961–62, 2001–02, 2004–05
- Kidderminster & District Football Association Cup
  - Winners 1885–86, 1886–87
- Dudley Guest Cup
  - Joint winners 1892–93

== Records ==
- Best FA Cup performance: First round, 1955–56, 1985–86, 1986–87, 1987–88, 1988–89, 1989–90, 1990–91, 1991–92, 2004–05
- Best FA Trophy performance: Semi-finals, 2019–20
- Best FA Vase performance: Winners, 1984–85, 1985–86
- Record attendance: 5,000 vs Hendon, FA Cup first round, 1954
- Biggest win: 13–1 vs Coventry Amateurs, Birmingham Senior Cup, 1956
- Heaviest defeat: 13–0 vs Darlaston, Birmingham Combination, 12 November 1938
- Most appearances: Paul Joinson, 658
- Most goals: Paul Joinson, 368
- Record transfer fee paid: £7,250 to Gresley Rovers for Stuart Evans
- Record transfer fee received: £40,000 from Rushden & Diamonds for Jim Rodwell

== See also ==
- Halesowen Town F.C. players
- Halesowen Town F.C. managers
