= Grove Recreation Ground =

Football stadium in Halesowen, England

Coordinates: 52°27′13.9″N 2°3′27.7″W

- The Grove
- Interactive map of Grove Recreation Ground
- Full name: James Grove Recreation & Sports Ground
- Former names: Stourbridge Road Ground
- Owner: James Grove Trust
- Capacity: 3,150
- Surface: Grass
- Record attendance: 5,000 (Halesowen v Hendon, 19 November 1955)

Construction
- Built: 1850s

Tenants
- Halesowen Cricket Club (1856–1948); Halesowen Town Football Club (1882–present)

The James Grove Recreation & Sports Ground, also known as the Grove Recreation Ground, The Grove, or the Stourbridge Road Ground, is a football stadium in Halesowen, England. It has been home to Halesowen Town Football Club since 1882. The ground was built in the 1850s for Halesowen Cricket Club who used the stadium until 1948.

== History ==
=== Early history ===
The Grove was built on land belonging to James Grove, a well-known local businessman who owned James Grove & Sons button company. The site, located on Stourbridge Road, Halesowen, was originally used for cricket. Halesowen Cricket Club, established ca.1856, used the ground for nearly a century before moving to Manor Abbey Sports Ground in 1948. It was not until ca.1882 that Halesowen Football Club moved to Stourbridge Road after having played at three different grounds since their founding in 1877.

The ground underwent a series of renovation projects during the 1920s. In 1920, the Halesowen Cricket, Football, & Recreation Club funded the construction of a pavilion and dressing room facility; before this, teams had gotten dressed in the nearby Waggon & Horses public house. Then, in 1924, the club opened a new grandstand at the Old Hawne Lane end of the stadium.

Towards the end of the decade, the Grove family relinquished ownership of the ground, entrusted the land to Halesowen Urban District Council, and renamed the stadium the James Grove Recreation & Sports Ground. In honour of the handover and at the cost of £137, the club bought a set of entry gates that are still in use on the Stourbridge Road today. Then, in 1934, the Council constructed another wooden stand along the west side of the ground.

Following the Second World War, the football club constructed new dressing facilities and, in 1950, opened a new 1,000 capacity stand to replace the timbre structure at the stadium's north end. The "Shed", as it has become known, is the oldest stand still in use at the ground today. In the late 1970s, after several failed attempts to demolish the ground for the construction of a highway, Halesowen Council passed ownership of the Grove to the newly formed James Grove Recreation & Sport Ground Trust in October 1984.

=== 1980s Redevelopment ===
Between 1983 and 1986, Halesowen Town won the West Midlands (Regional) League four times, but were repeatedly denied promotion to the Southern League due to the Grove's poor facilities. Therefore, beginning in 1983, the club embarked on a total redevelopment of the stadium. These improvements included a new £20,000 changing facility, the erection of floodlights, concrete terracing along one side of the ground, and a perimeter fence. But the biggest challenge was to level the notoriously steep pitch, a project that cost the club £27,000. In 1987, a 420 seater grandstand was built across the factory side of the ground which would later be dedicated as the Harry Rudge Stand. The stand was extended in 1998 and again in 2000 to include a press box, toilets, and 105 extra seats.

=== Recent Developments ===
In 2001, the club replaced the floodlights they had won in 1983 and inaugurated a new set in a friendly against Wolverhampton Wanderers.

Since the ground was handed over in 1929, the sale of alcohol had been banned at the Grove. However, in 2013, the Grove Trust lifted the ban and the club constructed a bar and function room named the James Grove Lounge. The lounge was renovated in 2018.

During the summer of 2020, a series of improvement works took place, including renovating the changing rooms, re-cladding the Shed, and general maintenance.

== Facilities ==
- Harry Rudge Stand. Seated stand with a capacity of 525 people. Contains the press box, public restrooms, an executive board room, and family enclosure.
- The "Shed". Covered stand at the Old Hawne Lane end of the ground.
- Open terracing. Two sides of the ground are covered with open-air terracing.
- James Grove Lounge & Bar. Opened in 2013 and renovated in 2018, the Grove Lounge acts as a bar on match days and a private function room.
- Yeltz Club Shop. Halesowen Town's official merchandise store.
- Yeltz Programme Shed.
- Yeltz Cafe.

== Records ==
=== Highest recorded attendance ===
5,000: Halesowen v Hendon, FA Cup first round, 19 November 1955.

=== Lowest recorded attendance ===
33: Halesowen v Gornal Athletic, 29 March 1977.

== See also ==
- Halesowen Town Football Club
