= Andrea Bell =

Architect in New Zealand

- Born: Dunedin
- Occupation: Architect
- Awards: NZIA President's Award, Fellow of the New Zealand Institute of Architects

Academic background
- Education: Unitec Institute of Technology, Christchurch Girls' High School
- Website: https://bellandco.nz/

Andrea Bell is an Aotearoa New Zealand Registered architect, as well as the founder and director of bell + co architecture ltd based in Dunedin. Bell specializes in urban design, and commercial and residential architecture. She has been actively involved with Te Kāhui Whaihanga New Zealand Institute of Architects as part of the Auckland and Southern branches, as well as in Aotearoa New Zealand tertiary education as an Architecture lecturer.

== Biography ==
Bell was born in Dunedin. She obtained a New Zealand Certificate in Architectural Draughting at Christchurch Polytechnic in 1994, then moved to Auckland where she trained in Architecture at Unitec School of Architecture and graduated with honors in 1998.

Bell started her career working at Pete Bossley Architects. During this time she worked on the Colin McCahon Artist's Residence in French Bay, Titirangi, a project which received several awards, and NZIA Local Award in 2007, an NZIA New Zealand Award in 2008 and an NZIA Colour Award. Positioned adjacent the family dwelling of Colin McCahon, according to the architects the artist's residence and studio are woven between the existing native trees. Further projects gaining NZIA Local Awards during this time included the Waiarohe House, Auckland 2009.

She started her own firm, Bell and Co Architecture (Bell + Co), in 2013. One year later she was a Finalist in the A+W Architecture & Women Wirihana Emerging Leadership Award 2014. Bell's own home, 'City House' located on the fringe of Auckland's CBD is an example of a flexible home, able to adapt to the changing needs of the occupants. The home was designed to resemble a converted warehouse to fit into surrounding light commercial buildings, while maintaining the provisions of a suburban family home. The industrial style home is built with concrete tilt-slab walls, polycarbonate walls, and finished with fine black steel and plywood. This project won an NZIA Auckland Architecture Award and the Best City Home of the Year in 2016.

Bell + Co won additional awards for a house in Cliffs Road, St Clair, Dunedin in 2022. The house was designed for an art collector, and the house itself has a large monolithic and sculptural exterior, clad with dark grey aluminium panels. It was awarded an NZIA Southern Architecture Award for Housing and won Home Magazine's City Home of the Year 2023.

Bell is a Fellow of the NZIA and received the NZIA President's Award in 2022.

Bell 's partner Andrew Kissell is a director at Bell + Co. They have two children together and reside in Dunedin.

== Award ==
- Winner Australasian LSA Competition Olympic Games Info Centre, Sydney. Issued by Lightweight Structures Association, Australia · Jan 1998;
- Te Kāhui Whaihanga NZIA President's Award, 2022
