= Emily Hollinshead =

Welsh footballer (born 1995)

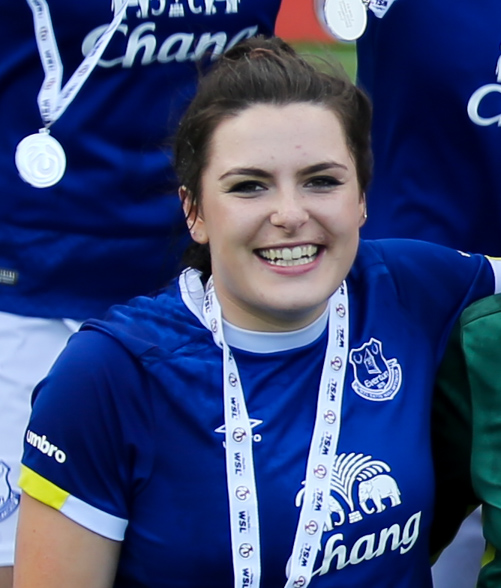
- Hollinshead in 2017

Personal information
- Full name: Emily Hollinshead
- Date of birth: 13 September 1995 (age 31)
- Place of birth: Nantwich, Cheshire, England
- Height: 1.74 m (5 ft 9 in)
- Positions: Striker; winger

Team information
- Current team: Fylde
- Number: 10

Youth career
- Crewe Alexandra

Senior career*
Years	Team	Apps	(Gls)
2014–2017	Everton	24	(5)
2017–2018	Sheffield United	1	(0)
2018–	Fylde	45	(15)

International career
2016–	Wales	4	(0)
- * Club domestic league appearances and goals as of 4 September 2021

Emily Hollinshead (born 13 September 1995) is a Welsh footballer who plays as a winger and striker for Fylde and the Wales national team.

When Hollinshead was 11, she challenged a ban from the FA on girls over 11 not being allowed to play in the same football teams as boys. She would later go on to play professionally for Everton, Sheffield United and Fylde.

== Early life ==
Hollinshead was born in Nantwich, England. When she was 11, Hollinshead challenged a ban from The Football Association on girls over 11 not being allowed to play in the same football team as boys. After her father threatened legal action against The FA for sex discrimination, they announced that they were either considering changing the age limit to under-14 level or allow a special dispensation for one year to allow girls to play in boys teams. During this time, she was a part of the Crewe Alexandra F.C. Girls Centre of Excellence. She later went on to study Primary Education at Manchester Metropolitan University with a view to become a teacher.

== Playing career ==
=== Club ===
Hollinshead started her senior career at Manchester United Ladies where she won the North West League.

==== Everton ====
In 2014, she moved to Women's Super League team Everton Ladies while also studying at Manchester Metropolitan University and playing for them in the Northern 1A British Universities and Colleges Sport League. She made her debut for Everton against Durham Women's F.C. in 2014.

==== Sheffield United ====
After the FA WSL Spring Series, Hollinshead made the move to Sheffield United.

==== Fylde ====
Hollinshead moved to Fylde in February 2018.

=== International ===
Hollinshead was called up to represent the Wales women's national football team by Jayne Ludlow for their UEFA Women's Euro 2017 qualifying matches. Hollinshead made her debut for Wales against the Bosnia and Herzegovina women's national football team.
