= GNG F.C. =

Association football club in England

Coordinates: 52°36′37.7″N 1°09′47.1″W

GNG
- Full name: Guru Nanak Gurdwara Football Club
- Founded: 1969; 57 years ago
- Ground: Riverside, Leicester
- Chairman: Nash Bains
- League: Leicestershire Senior League Premier Division
- 2021–22: Leicestershire Senior League Premier Division,
Home colours

Guru Nanak Gurdwara Football Club is a football club based in Leicester, East Midlands, England. They are currently members of the Leicestershire Senior League Premier Division and play at Riverside.

== History ==
GNG were formed in 1969 by a group of Sikh teenagers, naming the club after the Guru Nanak Gurdwara in Leicester. GNG's first game was a 4–3 win over Melbourne Hall in the Evington area of the city. GNG's early history was spent in the Leicester City League, before moving up to the Leicestershire Senior League. In 2015, GNG won Asian Football Club of the Year at the Asian Football Awards at Wembley Stadium. GNG entered the FA Vase for the first time in 2019–20.

== Ground ==
The club moved into Riverside in 2014.

== Records ==
- Best FA Vase performance: First qualifying round, 2019–20
