= Hampton & Richmond Borough Ladies F.C. =

Hampton & Richmond Borough Ladies FC
- Full name: Hampton & Richmond Borough Ladies FC
- Nicknames: The Beavers, Hampton
- Founded: 2002
- Ground: Beveree Stadium
- Capacity: 3,000
- Chairman: N/A
- Manager: First team: Kat Browne & Josh Goldingay, Development team: Jamie Kiernan & Jaymie Bailey
- League: Greater London Women's League Division One
- 2018–19: Greater London Women's League Division One, 3rd of 9
Home colours	Away colours

Hampton & Richmond Borough Ladies F.C. are a women's football club based in the London Borough of Richmond upon Thames, London, England, United Kingdom, and are affiliated with Hampton & Richmond Borough F.C.

Hampton & Richmond Ladies F.C. comprises a First team and a Development team, both competing successfully in the Greater London Women's League in Division One and Three respectively.

The club's home colours are red and navy - identical with all the affiliated clubs of Hampton & Richmond Borough F.C.

All club home games are played at Tudor Park Sports and Leisure, Feltham. First team home games kick off at 1pm, and Development home games kick off at 3pm.

== Formation and early years ==
The current HRBLFC team were formed over 12 years ago at U12 level at Chessington & Hook FC. After a number of years there, the team moved to Tooting & Mitcham FC and had success in the many years there. In 2006, after winning the treble at T&M, the team moved to Hampton & Richmond Borough FC to become the U18 side under the former Women’s Team. After a season at U18 level, the team moved into the Women’s side. In 2017, the Ladies Development side was formed.

== Club officials ==
The First team is now managed by Kat Browne and Josh Goldingay. The development side is managed by Jamie Kiernan and Jaymie Bailey. All coaches have a lot of experience behind them and are driving the club forward to continually grow the women's game at Hampton.

== Leagues and status ==
After a number of successful years, the Ladies team have been bouncing around in Step 5 of the Women’s Football pyramid with some promotions and some forced demotions due to a change in league structure. In the 2018/19 season, the First team came third in Division One of the Greater London Women's League and the Development team came seventh in Division Three South of the Greater London Women's League.

== Stadium ==
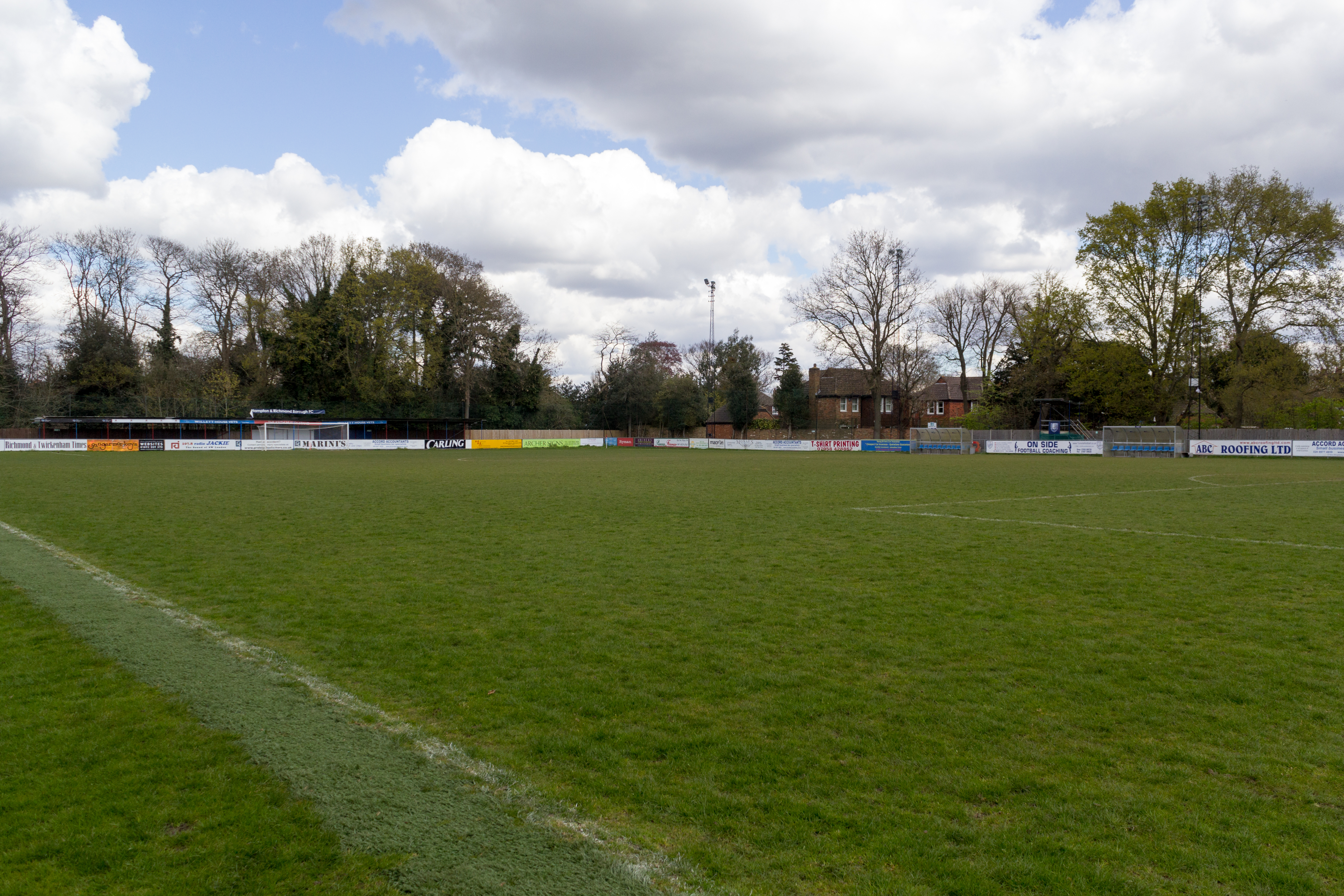
Beveree Stadium in April 2016

Although home games are currently played at Tudor Park, the official home of Hampton & Richmond Borough Ladies is the Beveree Stadium, sometimes referred to as the "Accord Beveree Stadium" due to a sponsorship deal. It is situated in Beaver Close, off Station Road in the heart of Hampton village. It has a total capacity of 3,000, with roughly 300 of this being seated and 900 in covered terracing.
