= Sarah Garratt =

English football referee

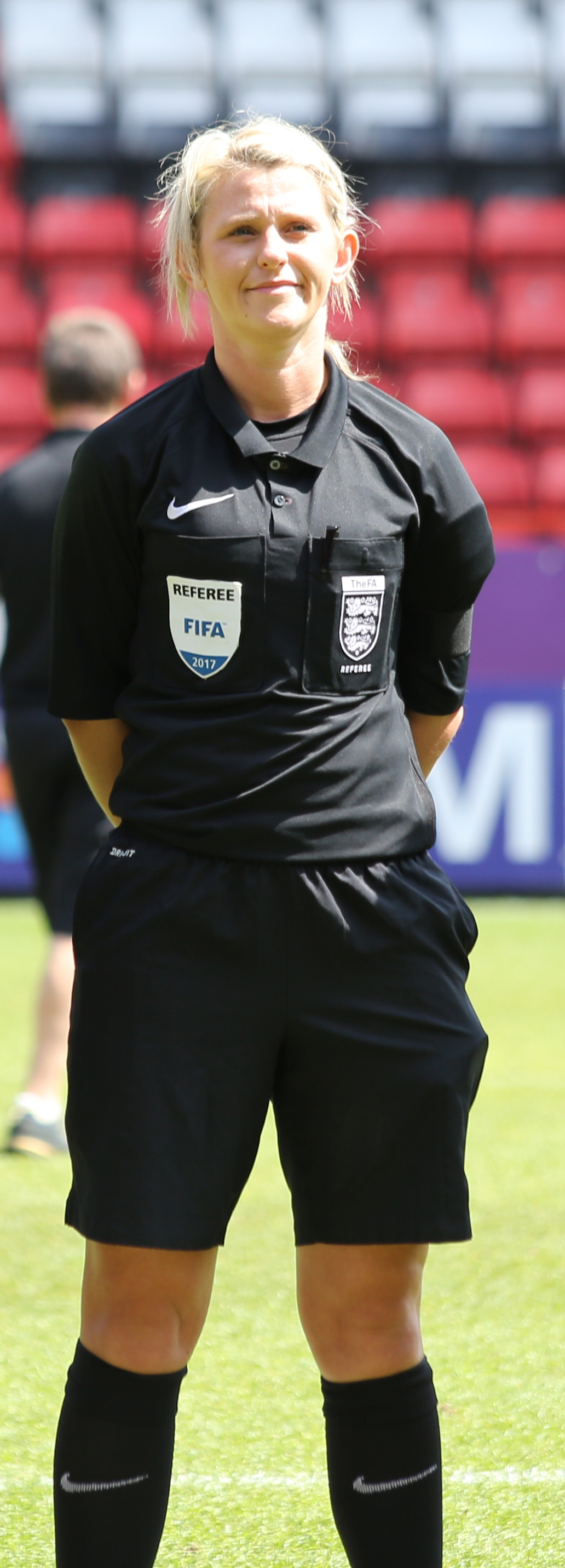
- Garratt in 2017
- Full name: Sarah Garratt

Domestic
Years	League	Role

Sarah Garratt is an English football referee with the Football Association Women's Super League, who in 2016 was selected to referee at that year's FA Women's Cup Final, held at Wembley Stadium on 14 May 2016. Garratt had previously been an assistant referee at the 2011 Women's Cup Final held at Coventry's Ricoh Arena.
