= Danielle Carter (footballer) =

English footballer

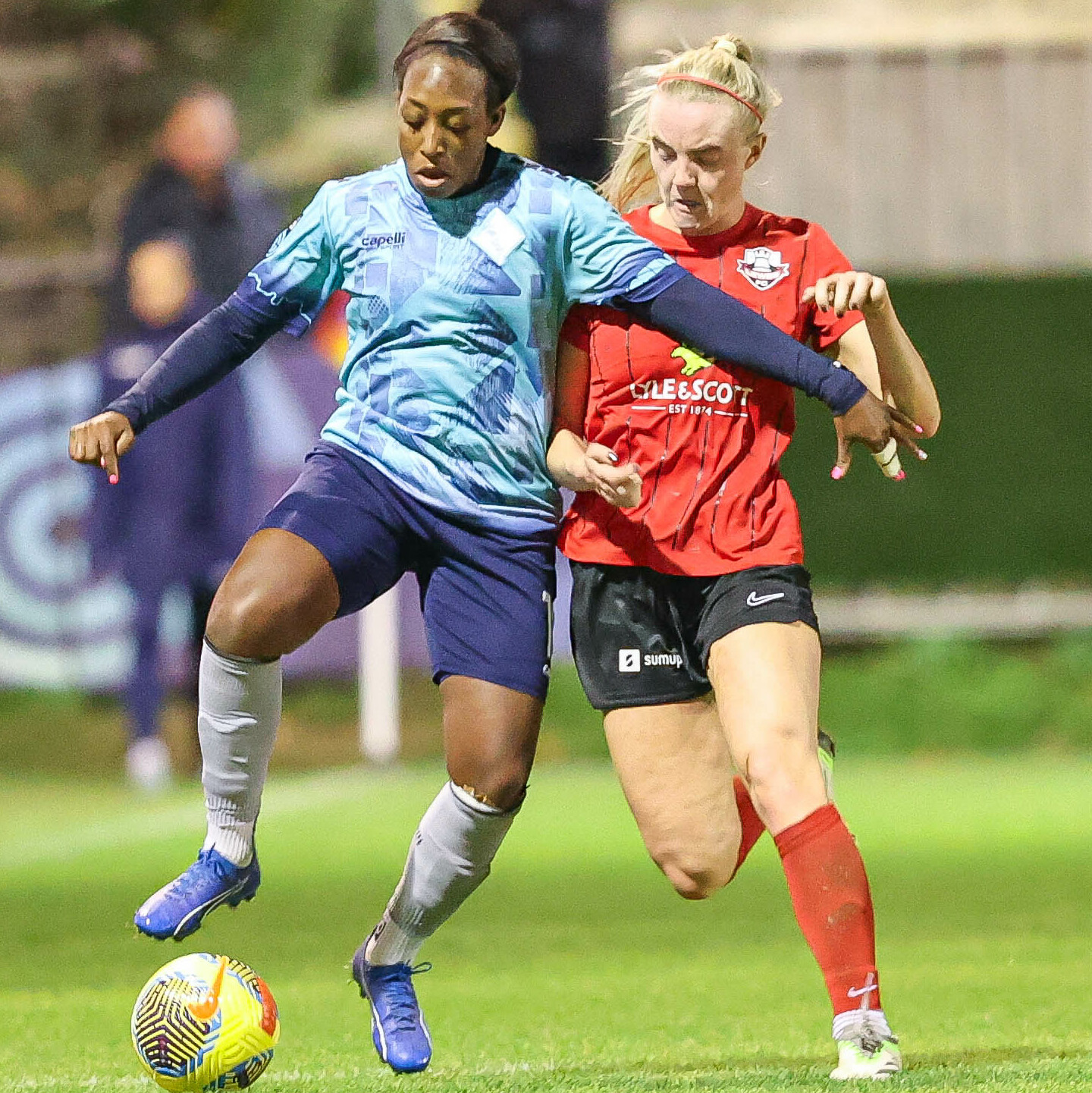
- Carter playing for London City Lionesses in 2023

Personal information
- Full name: Danielle Carter
- Date of birth: 18 May 1993 (age 33)
- Place of birth: East London, England
- Height: 5 ft 3 in (1.61 m)
- Position: Striker

Youth career
- Leyton Orient

Senior career*
Years	Team	Apps	(Gls)
2009–2020	Arsenal	101	(28)
2020–2021	Reading	21	(3)
2021–2023	Brighton & Hove Albion	41	(7)
2023–2025	London City Lionesses	22	(3)

International career^{‡}
2008–2010	England U-17	16	(6)
2010–2012	England U-19	16	(6)
2010	England U-20	3	(0)
2013–2016	England U-23	11	(1)
2015–2017	England	4	(6)
Medal record
Women's football
Representing Great Britain
Summer Universiade
Gold medal – first place	2013 Kazan	Team
- * Club domestic league appearances and goals as of 24 April 2025 ‡ National team caps and goals as of 24 April 2025

Danielle Carter-Loblack (born 18 May 1993) is an English former footballer who played as a forward.

Carter started her career with Arsenal, winning the 2015-16 FA Women's Cup and the 2017–18 FA WSL Cup during her eleven year spell with the club. She would later join Reading, Brighton & Hove Albion and London City Lionesses. On her England debut, she scored a hattrick against Estonia. Carter announced her retirement in January 2026.

== Club career ==
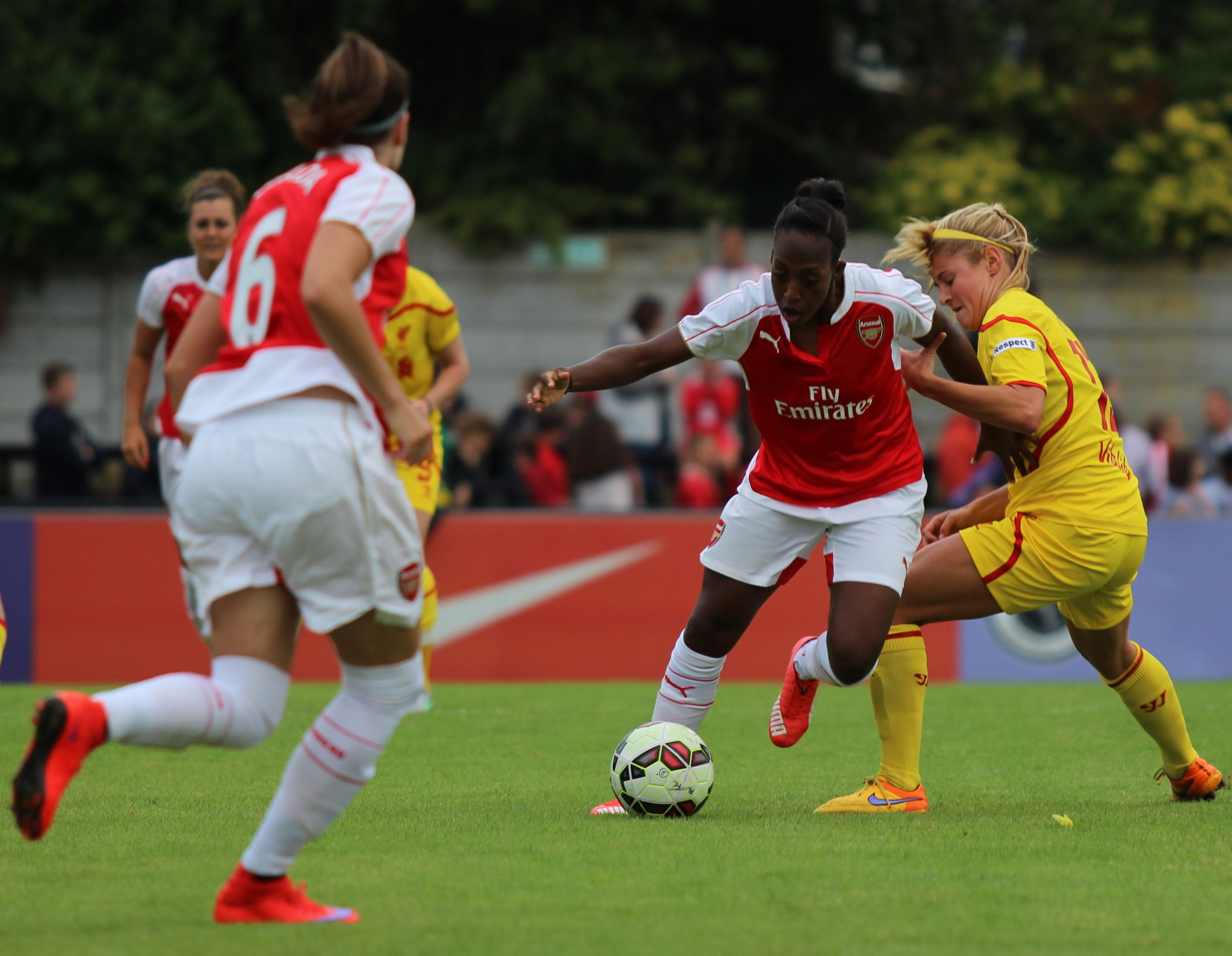
Carter vs Liverpool in 2015

Carter came through the ranks at the Leyton Orient Girls Centre of Excellence. In 2009, she moved to Arsenal, while remaining at school in Romford. In the 2010 FA Women's Cup Final, Carter was a 70th-minute substitute for Julie Fleeting, but Arsenal lost 3–2 to Everton after extra time.

In 2011, Carter helped Arsenal win the inaugural FA WSL title, as well as the 2010–11 FA Women's Cup. In the 2011–12 UEFA Women's Champions League, she scored twice against Bobruichanka and once against Rayo Vallecano as Arsenal reached the semi-final, where they lost to 1. FFC Frankfurt. Arsenal retained the WSL in 2012 but were upset by Chelsea in the semi-final of the FA Women's Cup.

In the 2015–16 FA Women's Cup final against Chelsea, she scored in the 18th minute of a 1–0 win which saw Arsenal to victory, thus lifting the cup.

In May 2018, Carter injured her anterior cruciate ligament in league win against Bristol City. Ten months later, against the same team, she made her return from injury in a 4–0 win. Despite this, she was ruled out of the 2019 World Cup. On 28 July 2019, Carter suffered a serious knee injury in a pre-season friendly against Bayern Munich. In August, it was confirmed as an anterior cruciate ligament injury to her right knee, her second in 14 months.

On 15 July 2020, Reading announced the signing of Carter.

Danielle Carter joined Brighton & Hove Albion from Reading for an undisclosed fee in July 2021, signing a two-year contract.

On 22 August 2023, London City Lionesses announced the signing Danielle Carter, with the forward signing a two-year contract.

Following their promotion to the Women's Super League, Carter was one of five players released by the club.

== International career ==
Carter started playing for England at U-15 level. She played as they came fourth in the 2008 FIFA U-17 Women's World Cup in New Zealand, scoring twice against Brazil. Two years later she competed in the 2010 FIFA U-20 Women's World Cup in Germany.

Carter helped Great Britain win a gold medal in July 2013, at the 2013 Summer Universiade in Kazan, Russia. In September 2013, Carter was named in the senior England squad by interim coach Brent Hills.

Coach Mark Sampson gave Carter her senior international debut in a UEFA Women's Euro 2017 qualifying match against Estonia on 21 September 2015. She marked the occasion by scoring a hat-trick in England's 8–0 win.

Carter was allotted 190 when the FA announced their legacy numbers scheme to honour the 50th anniversary of England’s inaugural international.

=== International goals ===
As of match played 28 November 2017. England score listed first, score column indicates score after each Carter goal.

International goals by date, venue, cap, opponent, score, result and competition
No.	Date	Venue	Cap	Opponent	Score	Result	Competition	Ref.
1	21 September 2015	A. Le Coq Arena, Tallinn, Estonia	1	Estonia	1–0	8–0	UEFA Women's Euro 2017 qualifying	
2	21 September 2015	A. Le Coq Arena, Tallinn, Estonia	1	Estonia	7–0	8–0	UEFA Women's Euro 2017 qualifying	
3	21 September 2015	A. Le Coq Arena, Tallinn, Estonia	1	Estonia	8–0	8–0	UEFA Women's Euro 2017 qualifying	
4	15 September 2016	Meadow Lane, Nottingham, England	2	Estonia	1–0	5–0	UEFA Women's Euro 2017 qualifying	
5	15 September 2016	Meadow Lane, Nottingham, England	2	Estonia	3–0	5–0	UEFA Women's Euro 2017 qualifying	
6	15 September 2016	Meadow Lane, Nottingham, England	2	Estonia	4–0	5–0	UEFA Women's Euro 2017 qualifying	

== Honours ==
Arsenal

- FA Cup: 2016
- FA Women's League Cup: 2017–18

International

- Summer Universiade: 2013
