= Tash Knapman =

English footballer

Personal information
- Full name: Natasha Leanne Knapman
- Date of birth: 22 August 1991 (age 35)
- Place of birth: Torquay, England,
- Position: Forward

Team information
- Current team: Plymouth Argyle
- Number: 13

Youth career
- 200?–2008: Totnes & Dartington SC

Senior career*
Years	Team	Apps	(Gls)
2008–2009	Totnes & Dartington SC		
2009–2012	Plymouth Argyle	21	(15)
2012–2015	Exeter City		
2015–2016	Yeovil Town	27	(6)
2016–	Plymouth Argyle	65	(95)
- * Club domestic league appearances and goals as of 16:35, 5 May 2020 (UTC)

Natasha Leanne "Tash" Knapman (born 22 August 1991) is an English female footballer who plays for Plymouth Argyle.

== Club career ==
Knapman was spotted by Totnes & Dartington SC reserve team manager Keith Hawkins when she was playing for Sainsbury's Torquay store in an in-house friendly against the Newton Abbot store's team. Whilst playing for the reserve team, she was scouted by Plymouth Argyle and Newquay, who gave seven-day notices of approach in October 2009. She had scored 49 goals for the reserves the previous season, and had already added a further 9 to her tally before the notices were given. In September 2009, Knapman was called up to the Devon's Senior Women's squad.

Knapman joined Plymouth Argyle in October 2009, making her debut on 22 November 2009 in a 5–1 FA Women's Cup win over Swindon Supermarine. She scored twice on her debut. During her stay at the club, Knapman was the FA Women's Premier League Southern Division top goalscorer in 2012 with 14 league goals.

Knapman joined Exeter City in 2012. She made her debut on 25 October 2012 against Oxford United, scoring a late equaliser. Knapman scored City's third goal in a 4–3 win in the 2013 Devon County Cup final against her former club Plymouth Argyle. Knapman's final game for the Grecians saw her score twice in a 4–2 win over Torquay United in the 2015 Devon County Cup final.

Knapman joined Yeovil Town ahead of the 2015 WSL 2 season. She made her debut in a 4–2 home defeat to Reading. Knapman had put Yeovil back on level terms at 1–1, but Fran Kirby went on to score all 4 of Reading's goals.

== Personal life ==
While at primary school, she captained the boys' team, as well as playing for another local boys' team. However, after it became difficult to get a girls' team together in secondary school, she gave up football at 14 and became a black belt in Taekwondo, going on to become selected by Australia.

Knapman works as an activity instructor. She supports Tottenham Hotspur.

== Honours ==
- Playing for Plymouth Argyle in the FA Women's Premier League Southern Division: Top Goalscorer, 2012 (14 league goals)
- Playing for Exeter City in the Devon County Cup: 2013, 2015
