= Garston Ladies F.C. =

Garston Ladies FC
- Founded: 1996 as Garston Girls FC
- Ground: Bushey Sports Club, Aldenham Road, Bushey
- Chairman: Ray Smith
- Website: http://www.garstonladiesfc.co.uk/
Home colours

Garston Ladies FC is a football club for girls and women, based at Bushey Sports Club (formerly known as the Metropolitan Police Sports Club) in Bushey, Hertfordshire. The club was formed in 1996 at Lea Farm School, Watford as Garston Girls FC and has grown rapidly to become the largest female-only club in Hertfordshire. In May 2002, Garston Girls joined forces with Everett Ladies to form Garston Ladies FC. The club was awarded the FA Charter Standard in December 2005 in recognition of its high standards. Garston Ladies has become increasingly successful, winning a number of county cups and league titles. A number of players have gone on to achieve England recognition including former England Under-23's goalkeeper Lauren Davey.

== History ==
Garston Ladies FC has been affiliated to the Hertfordshire FA since the club was formed. The club's junior teams (U18 and below) play in the Hertfordshire Girls Football Partnership League while the senior teams compete in the Beds & Herts County Girls & Women's Football League. For the 2015–2016 season, Garston Ladies re-branded its junior teams with the names of big cats to differentiate between different teams in the same age group.

In January 2013 Garston Ladies FC formed an informal partnership with local boys' youth team Bushey & Oxhey FC.

The 2011–2012 season proved to be the most successful in the club's history. Garston Ladies FC's ten junior teams won thirteen honours between them including three League titles, two League Cups, and two County Cups. The U-10s became the third Garston Ladies team to complete the treble of League, League Cup and County Cup following in the footsteps of the U-13s (2009–2010) and the U-13 Mets (2010–2011).

In the 2012–2013 season, Garston Ladies FC ran ten junior teams and one senior team. The U-10s and the U-11 Mets were the club's most successful teams, winning five trophies between them. The U-11 Mets won the treble for the second year in a row, having won all three competitions at U-10 level in 2011–2012.

During the 2013–2014 season the U-12 Mets became the most successful team in the club's history, winning the treble (league, league cup and county cup) for the third season in a row and completing three seasons of competitive football without losing a game.

The club grew rapidly between 2013 and 2017 increasing from 10 to 27 squads. In the 2018–2019 season Garston Ladies FC ran 23 squads.

On 22 March 2014, Sky Sports News reporter Seb Walke visited Bushey Sports Club to interview Garston Ladies FC coaches, players and parents as part of their focus on grassroots football. The resulting news article was broadcast on Monday 24 March 2014.

On 11 August 2015, Garston Ladies FC were winners of the Audentior Award (Watford Borough Council's Civic Recognition and Award scheme) in the "Mayor's Sporting Achievement" category.

== Honours ==
Sources: County Cups | Hertfordshire Girls Football League & Home Counties Girls League | Greater London Women's League | London & South Eastern Regional Women's League | Bedfordshire and Hertfordshire County Girls and Women's Football League

=== 2017-2018 ===
Under 12 Wildcats (Managers - Andy Wells, Neil Cole & Scott Magill)

- Hertfordshire Girls Football Partnership League Under 12 Division Two Champions
- Hertfordshire Girls Football Partnership League Under 12 League Cup Finalists

Under 13 Tigers (Managers - Rich Bennett, Paul Humphrey & Alan Hines)

- Hertfordshire FA Under 13 County Cup Winners

Under 13 Panthers (Managers - Phil Broch, Greg Edmunds & Phil Bennell)

- Hertfordshire Girls Football Partnership League Under 13 League Shield Finalists

Under 14 Jaguars (Managers - Mike Webster & Dan Holding)

- Hertfordshire Girls Football Partnership League Under 14 League Cup Finalists

Under 15 Lionesses (Manager - Andy Cullinane)

- Hertfordshire FA Under 15 County Cup Winners

Under 15 Tigers (Managers - Lee Warwick & Adam Marsh)

- Hertfordshire Girls Football Partnership League Under 15 Division Two Champions
- Hertfordshire Girls Football Partnership League Under 15 League Cup Finalists

Under 16 Pumas (Managers - Leigh Edmunds, Andy Phillips & Jason Dale)

- Hertfordshire FA Under 16 County Cup Winners

Under 18 (Manager - Stuart Farrell)

- Hertfordshire Girls Football Partnership League Under 18 League Shield Winners

Second Team (Managers - Guy Scott, Paul Roberts & Daren Hart)

- Bedfordshire and Hertfordshire County Girls and Women's Football League Division Two Champions

=== 2016-2017 ===
Under 11 Jaguars (Managers - Tesh Parmar & Lee Alexander)

- Hertfordshire Girls Football Partnership League Under 11 League Shield Winners

Under 11 Wildcats (Managers - Andy Wells, Scott Magill & Neil Cole)

- Hertfordshire Girls Football Partnership League Under 11 League Shield Finalists

Under 12 Tigers (Managers - Rich Bennett & Paul Humphrey)

- Hertfordshire Girls Football Partnership League Under 12 Division One Champions
- Hertfordshire Girls Football Partnership League Under 12 League Cup Winners
- Hertfordshire FA Under 12 County Cup Winners

Under 12 Panthers (Managers - Phil Broch, Greg Edmunds & Phil Bennell)

- Hertfordshire Girls Football Partnership League Under 12 Division Three Champions

Under 13 Leopards(Managers - Mark Harrison, Gavin Moore & Paul Coleman)

- Hertfordshire Girls Football Partnership League Under 13 Division One Runners-up

Under 13 Jaguars (Managers - Mike Webster & Dan Holding)

- Hertfordshire Girls Football Partnership League Under 13 League Shield Winners

Under 14 Lionesses (Managers - Sarah Lewis & Andy Cullinane)

- Hertfordshire Girls Football Partnership League Under 14 League Division One Runners-up
- Hertfordshire Girls Football Partnership League Under 14 League Shield Winners

Under 15 Pumas (Managers - Leigh Edmunds & Andy Phillips)

- Hertfordshire FA Under 15 County Cup Winners
- Hertfordshire Girls Football Partnership League Under 15 League Shield Winners

Under 16 (Managers - Samantha Gillings & Stuart Farrell)

- Hertfordshire Girls Football Partnership League Under 16 League Shield Winners

Under 18 Jaguars (Managers - Ray Smith & Dave Annal)

- Hertfordshire Girls Football Partnership League Under 18 League Shield Finalists

=== 2015-2016 ===
Under 11 Tigers (Managers - Rich Bennett & Paul Humphrey)

- Hertfordshire Girls Football Partnership League Under 11 League Cup Winners

Under 12 Leopards (Managers - Mark Harrison & Gavin Moore)

- Hertfordshire FA Under 12 County Cup Winners

Under 13 Tigers (Managers - Martin Jenman, Alistair Whiteford & Lee Warwick)

- Hertfordshire Girls Football Partnership League Under 13 League Shield Finalists

Under 13 Lionesses (Managers - Sarah Lewis & Andy Cullinane)

- Hertfordshire FA Under 13 County Cup Finalists
- Hertfordshire Girls Football Partnership League Under 13 League Shield Winners

Under 14 Panthers (Managers - Pete Sargent & Del Brimble)

- Hertfordshire Girls Football Partnership League Under 14 9v9 League Cup Finalists

Under 14 Pumas (Managers - Leigh Edmunds, Andy Phillips & Jason Dale)

- Hertfordshire FA Under 14 County Cup Winners
- Hertfordshire Girls Football Partnership League Under 14 11v11 League Cup Finalists

Under 15 (Managers - Samantha Gillings & Stuart Farrell)

- Hertfordshire FA Under 15 County Cup Finalists
- Hertfordshire Girls Football Partnership League Under 15 League Shield Winners

Under 16 Jaguars (Managers - Ray Smith & Dave Annal)

- Hertfordshire Girls Football Partnership League Under 16 Division Two Champions

Under 18 Sharks (Managers - Guy Scott & Paul Roberts)

- Bedfordshire and Hertfordshire County Girls and Women's Under 18 League Runners-up

First Team (Managers - Colin Sills & Mark Murphy)

- Bedfordshire and Hertfordshire County Girls and Women's Football League Openage League Cup Winners

=== 2014-2015 ===
Under 11 Mets (Managers - Mark Harrison & Gavin Moore)

- Hertfordshire Girls Football Partnership League Under 11 League Shield Winners

Under 12 Mets (Manager - Sarah Lewis)

- Hertfordshire Girls Football Partnership League Under 12 Division One Champions
- Hertfordshire Girls Football Partnership League Under 12 League Cup Finalists

Under 13 Mets (Managers - Leigh Edmunds & Andy Phillips)

- Hertfordshire FA Under 13 County Cup Finalists
- Hertfordshire Girls Football Partnership League Under 13 League Cup Winners

Under 14 (Manager - Samantha Gillings)

- Hertfordshire Girls Football Partnership League Under 14 Division Two Runners-up

Under 15 (Managers - Ray Smith & Dave Annal)

- Hertfordshire Girls Football Partnership League Under 15 League Shield Finalists

Under 16 Sharks (Managers - Guy Scott & Paul Roberts)

- Bedfordshire and Hertfordshire County Girls and Women's Football League Under 16 League Cup Finalists

96FC (Managers - Mark Denham, John Alexander, Darren Berryman & John Hastie)

- Bedfordshire and Hertfordshire County Girls and Women's Football League Division Three Champions

Seniors (Managers - Colin Sills & Mark Murphy)

- Bedfordshire and Hertfordshire County Girls and Women's Football League Openage League Cup Winners

=== 2013-2014 ===
Under 10 Mets (Managers - Mark Harrison & Gavin Moore)

- Hertfordshire Girls Football Partnership League Under 10 Trophy Finalists

Under 11 Mets (Manager - Sarah Lewis)

- Hertfordshire Girls Football Partnership League Under 11 Division One Runners-up

Under 12 Mets (Managers - Leigh Edmunds & Andy Phillips)

- Hertfordshire Girls Football Partnership League Under 12 Division One Champions
- Hertfordshire FA Under 12 County Cup Winners
- Hertfordshire Girls Football Partnership League Under 12 League Cup Winners

Under 13 (Manager - Samantha Gillings)

- Hertfordshire Girls Football Partnership League Under 13 League Shield Finalists

Under 14 (Managers - Ray Smith & Dave Annal)

- Hertfordshire Girls Football Partnership League Under 14 League Cup Finalists

Under 16 Mets (Managers - Darren Berryman & Dave Layman)

- Hertfordshire Girls Football Partnership League Under 16 Division One Runners-up
- Hertfordshire Girls Football Partnership League Under 16 League Shield Winners

=== 2012-2013 ===
Under 10 (Manager - Sarah Lewis)

- Hertfordshire Girls Football Partnership League Under 10 Division One Champions
- Hertfordshire Girls Football Partnership League Under 10 League Cup Winners

Under 11 Mets (Managers - Leigh Edmunds & Andy Phillips)

- Hertfordshire Girls Football Partnership League Under 11 Division One Champions
- Hertfordshire Girls Football Partnership League Under 11 League Cup Winners
- Hertfordshire FA Under 11 County Cup Winners

Under 15 Mets (Managers - Darren Berryman & Dave Layman)

- Hertfordshire Girls Football Partnership League Under 15 Division One Runners-up
- Hertfordshire FA Under 15 County Cup Finalists

Under 18 (Managers - Mark Denham & John Alexander)

- Hertfordshire Girls Football Partnership League Under 18 League Cup Finalists

=== 2011-2012 ===
Under 10 (Managers - Leigh Edmunds & Andy Phillips)

- Hertfordshire Girls Football Partnership League Under 10 Division One Champions
- Hertfordshire Girls Football Partnership League Under 10 League Cup Winners
- Hertfordshire FA Under 10 County Cup Winners

Under 11 Mets (Managers - Ray Smith & Dave Annal)

- Hertfordshire Girls Football Partnership League Under 11 Division One Runners-up
- Hertfordshire Girls Football Partnership League Under 11 League Cup Winners

Under 12 (Managers - Steve Thomas & Martin Ralph)

- Hertfordshire Girls Football Partnership League Under 12 Division Two Champions

Under 13 (Managers - Guy Scott & Paul Roberts)

- Hertfordshire Girls Football Partnership League Under 13 League Cup Finalists
- Hertfordshire FA Under 13 County Cup Finalists

Under 14 Mets (Manager - Dave Layman)

- Hertfordshire Girls Football Partnership League Under 14 Division One (11-a-side) Runners-up
- Hertfordshire Girls Football Partnership League Under 14 (11-a-side) League Cup Finalists
- Hertfordshire FA Under 14 County Cup Winners

Under 14 Diamonds (Managers - Andy Chambers & John Hastie)

- Hertfordshire Girls Football Partnership League Under 14 (9-a-side) Champions
- Hertfordshire Girls Football Partnership League Under 14 (9-a-side) League Shield Finalists

=== 2010-2011 ===
Under 10 (Managers - Ray Smith & Dave Annal)

- Hertfordshire Girls Football Partnership League Under 10 Division One Champions
- Hertfordshire Girls Football Partnership League Under 10 League Cup Finalists
- Hertfordshire FA Under 10 County Cup Finalists

Under 13 Mets (Manager - Dave Layman)

- Hertfordshire Girls Football Partnership League Under 13 Division One Champions
- Hertfordshire Girls Football Partnership League Under 13 League Cup Winners
- Hertfordshire FA Under 13 County Cup Winners

Seniors 1st team (Manager - Colin Sills)

- Greater London Women's League Division One North Champions

=== 2009-2010 ===
Under 10 (Managers - Steve Thomas & Martin Ralph)

- Hertfordshire Girls Football Partnership League Under 10 League Shield Finalists

Under 11 Sharks (Managers - Guy Scott & Paul Roberts)

- Hertfordshire Girls Football Partnership League Under 12 (7-a-side) Division Two Runners-up

Under 12 Mets (Manager - Dave Layman)

- Hertfordshire Girls Football Partnership League Under 12 Division One Champions
- Hertfordshire Girls Football Partnership League Under 12 (9-a-side) League Cup Finalists
- Hertfordshire FA Under 12 County Cup Winners

Under 12 Diamonds (Managers - Donna Ford & Karen Walter)

- Hertfordshire Girls Football Partnership League Under 12 League Shield Finalists

Under 13 (Manager - Sarah Lewis)

- Hertfordshire Girls Football Partnership League Under 14 Division One Champions
- Hertfordshire Girls Football Partnership League Under 14 League Cup Winners
- Hertfordshire FA Under 13 County Cup Winners

Under 14 (Managers - Mark Denham & John Alexander)

- Hertfordshire FA Under 14 County Cup Finalists

=== 2008-2009 ===
Under 9 (Manager - Gary Porter)

- Home Counties Girls Football League Under 9 Runners-up

Under 11 (Manager - Dave Layman)

- Home Counties Girls Football League Under 11 Runners-up
- Home Counties Girls Football League Under 11 League Cup Finalists

Under 12 (Manager - Sarah Lewis)

- Hertfordshire FA Under 12 County Cup Winners

Seniors 1st team (Manager - Colin Sills)

- London & South Eastern Regional Women's League Division One Champions

=== 2007-2008 ===
Under 13 (Manager - Donna Sills)

- Home Counties Girls Football League Under 13 Division Two Champions
- Hertfordshire FA Under 13 County Cup Finalists

Under 14 (Manager - Gary Waller)

- Home Counties Girls Football League Under 14 Division One Runners-up
- Hertfordshire FA Under 14 County Cup Finalists

Under 16 Purples (Manager - Ray Smith)

- Home Counties Girls Football League Under 16 Division Two Runners-up

=== 2006-2007 ===
Under 13 (Manager - Gary Waller)

- Hertfordshire FA Under 13 County Cup Winners

Seniors 2nd team (Manager - Keith Silver)

- Greater London Women's League Division Three North Champions

=== 2005-2006 ===
Under 12 (Manager - Gary Waller)

- Hertfordshire FA Under 12 County Cup Winners

Under 14 Purples (Manager - Ray Smith)

- Hertfordshire Girls Football League Under 14 Division Two Runners-up

Under 15 (Manager - Keith Silver)

- Hertfordshire Girls Football League Under 15 Champions

Seniors 1st team (Manager - Colin Sills)

- Greater London Women's League Division One Champions
- Greater London Women's League Cup Finalists

Seniors 2nd team (Manager - Andy Roads)

- Greater London Women's Reserve League Division Two Champions

=== 2004-2005 ===
Under 11 (Manager - Gary Waller)

- Hertfordshire Girls Football League Under 11 Division One Runners-up

Seniors 1st team (Manager - Colin Sills)

- Greater London Women's League Division Three Champions
- Hertfordshire FA Women's County Cup Finalists

=== 2003-2004 ===
Seniors 2nd team (Manager - John Johnston)

- Greater London Women's League Reserve Division Two Runners-up

=== 2002-2003 ===
Under 12 (Managers - Pete Clark & Pat Duffy)

- Hertfordshire FA Under 12 County Cup Finalists

=== 2001-2002 ===
Under 14 (Managers - Andy Roads & John Johnston)

- Hertfordshire FA Under 14 County Cup Finalists
