= 2019–20 FA Women's National League Cup =

Tournament details
- Country: England and Wales
- Teams: 71

Final positions
- Champions: None awarded (final cancelled)
- Runners-up: None awarded (final cancelled)

Tournament statistics
- Matches played: 67
- Goals scored: 310 (4.63 per match)
- All statistics correct as of 19 March 2021.

The 2019–20 FA Women's National League Cup is the 29th running of the FA Women's National League Cup, which began in 1991. It is the major League Cup competition run by the FA Women's National League, and for the sixth season it is being run in conjunction with their secondary League Cup competition, the National League Plate.

Seventy of the seventy-one National League clubs entered at the competition in the Determining round, with the winners continuing into the competition proper and the losers going into the National League Plate tournament. The only exception were Larkhall Athletic who were granted a bye into the first round proper of the cup. The previous two tournaments were both won by Blackburn Rovers, but after winning promotion to the FA Women's Championship in the summer of 2019 they did not take part in the competition this season.

Due to the COVID-19 pandemic, the final was not held and no winners were named.

== Results ==
All results listed are published by The Football Association. Games are listed by round in date order, and then in alphabetical order of the home team where matches were played on the same day.

The division each team play in is indicated in brackets after their name: (S)=Southern Division; (N)=Northern Division; (SW1)=Division One South West; (SE1)=Division One South East; (M1)=Division One Midlands; (N1)=Division One North.

=== Determining round ===
The competition began with a Determining Round, which consisted of 70 teams in the FA Women's National League being drawn in pairs. The winners of these 35 games progress to the next stage of the competition, while the losers qualify for the 2019–20 FA Women's National League Plate.

==== Northern section ====
25 August 2019	Bedworth United (M1)	4–3 (a.e.t.)	Stockport County (N1)	Bedworth
14:00 BST (UTC+01:00)	Farnsworth; Gilkes; McGuckin; Wilson	Report	Charnley; Mapp; Massey	Stadium: The Oval; Attendance: 40

25 August 2019	Birmingham & West Midlands (M1)	8–0	Bolton Wanderers (N1)	Boldmere
14:00 BST (UTC+01:00)	Grove 8'; Steele 41'; Cooper 52', 90'; Dickinson 57'; Lundle 58', 62'; Hargreaves 66'	Report		Stadium: Trevor Brown Memorial Ground

25 August 2019	Brighouse Town (N1)	2–1	Loughborough Foxes (N)	Brighouse
14:00 BST (UTC+01:00)	Bartup	Report	McGrother	Stadium: The Yorkshire Payments Stadium; Attendance: 30

25 August 2019	Burton Albion (M1)	1–8	Derby County (N)	Rocester
14:00 BST (UTC+01:00)	Hornsby 82'	Report	Gilliatt 5', 45+2', 50'; Domingo 6'; Newton 27', 56'; Keryakoplis 58', 87'	Stadium: Hillsfield; Attendance: 65

25 August 2019	Chorley (N1)	10–2	Leafield Athletic (M1)	Chorley
14:00 BST (UTC+01:00)	Vella 5'; Donoghue 15', 36', 56'; Mills 23', 29'; Kemp 26'; Marshall 59'; Pilling 74'; Searson 81'	Report	Bridges; McCormack	Stadium: Victory Park Stadium; Attendance: 115

25 August 2019	Doncaster Rovers Belles (M1)	1–4	Sheffield F.C. (N)	Doncaster
14:00 BST (UTC+01:00)	Saxton	Report	Marsden 48'; Wortley 52'; Johnson 89', 90+5'	Stadium: Keepmoat Stadium; Attendance: 248

25 August 2019	Durham Cestria (N1)	2–1	Middlesbrough (N)	Durham
14:00 BST (UTC+01:00)	Purdham 33', 71'	Report	Hutchinson 56'	Stadium: The Graham Sports Centre

25 August 2019	Huddersfield Town (N)	4–3	Nottingham Forest (N)	Kirkburton
14:00 BST (UTC+01:00)	Mallin 9'; Sowerby 56', 77', 85'	Report	Hamilton 8', 20'; Sullivan 12'	Stadium: The Stafflex Arena; Attendance: 98

25 August 2019	Leeds United (N1)	0–3	Burnley (N)	Wetherby
15:00 BST (UTC+01:00)		Report	Greenhalgh 79'; Halligan 89', 90+4'	Stadium: Thorp Arch; Attendance: 60

25 August 2019	Lincoln City (M1)	2–2 (a.e.t.) (3–4 p)	Stoke City (N)	Lincoln
14:00 BST (UTC+01:00)	Atkinson 8'; Murrell 65'	Report	Baptiste 24'; McCoy 79'	Stadium: Ashby Avenue

25 August 2019	Liverpool Feds (N1)	1–0	Bradford City (N1)	Liverpool
14:00 BST (UTC+01:00)	Rogers 49'	Report		Stadium: South Liverpool Football Hub

25 August 2019	Long Eaton United (M1)	7–2	Chester-le-Street (N1)	Long Eaton
14:00 BST (UTC+01:00)	Barber; Emery; Evans; Sears	Report	Elston 56', 66'	Stadium: Grange Park; Attendance: 30

25 August 2019	Norton & Stockton Ancients (N1)	6–2	Hull City (N)	Stockton-on-Tees
14:00 BST (UTC+01:00)	Atkinson; Burton; Millward; Reed; Thorns	Report	Ackroyd 48'; Smith 70'	Stadium: Norton Teesside Sports Complex

25 August 2019	Solihull Moors (M1)	0–8	Fylde (N)	Studley
15:00 BST (UTC+01:00)		Report	Carroll; Hollinshead; Redgrave; Rowe; Young	Stadium: Studley Sports Centre

25 August 2019	Sunderland (N)	3–2	Newcastle United (N1)	Sunderland
14:00 BST (UTC+01:00)	Brown; Galloway	Report	Gardener; Longcake	Stadium: Stadium of Light; Attendance: 1168

25 August 2019	The New Saints (M1)	6–3	Leicester United (M1)	Oswestry
14:00 BST (UTC+01:00)	Bebbington; Griffiths; Morris; Pennington	Report	Cropper; Robinson	Stadium: Park Hall Stadium; Attendance: 50

25 August 2019	West Bromwich Albion (N)	2–4	Barnsley (N1)	Walsall
14:00 BST (UTC+01:00)	Greaves 18'; Arber 86'	Report	Crosby 30', 39'; Woodhouse 46'; Bell 90+3'	Stadium: University of Wolverhampton Walsall Campus

25 August 2019	Wolverhampton Wanderers (M1)	4–2	Sporting Khalsa (M1)	Castlecroft
14:00 BST (UTC+01:00)	Anslow 4'; Cross 28', 32', 45'	Report	Anderson 53'; Walker 80'	Stadium: CKW Stadium; Attendance: 108

==== Southern section ====
25 August 2019	Billericay Town (SE1)	3–1	Cheltenham Town (SW1)	Billericay
14:00 BST (UTC+01:00)	Blackie; Dougal; Rodney	Report	Butterfield 22'	Stadium: New Lodge

25 August 2019	Chesham United (SW1)	8–0	Brislington (SW1)	Chesham
11:00 BST (UTC+01:00)	Fraser; Kibrom; Arrowsmith; Bloor	Report		Stadium: The Meadow

25 August 2019	Chichester City (S)	1–3	Cambridge City (SE1)	Chichester
14:00 BST (UTC+01:00)	Fox	Report	Fitzsimons; Gillies; Tonks	Stadium: Oaklands Park; Attendance: 100

25 August 2019	Enfield Town (SE1)	2–0	Norwich City (SE1)	Enfield
14:00 BST (UTC+01:00)	Long 7'; Baker 54'	Report		Stadium: Queen Elizabeth II Stadium

25 August 2019	Exeter City (SW1)	4–3	Plymouth Argyle (S)	Cullompton
14:00 BST (UTC+01:00)	Kaptein 18', 43', 66'; Britton 48'	Report	Pollock 34', 72'; Jones 46'	Stadium: Speeds Meadow

25 August 2019	Kent Football United (SE1)	0–2	AFC Basildon (SE1)	Dartford
14:00 BST (UTC+01:00)		Report	Binding 20'	Stadium: Glentworth Sports Club

25 August 2019	Keynsham Town (S)	2–1	Buckland Athletic (SW1)	Keynsham
14:00 BST (UTC+01:00)	Turner 32'; Piggott 84'	Report	Stacey 13'	Stadium: Crown Field

25 August 2019	Leyton Orient (SE1)	4–3 (a.e.t.)	Cambridge United (SE1)	Mile End
14:00 BST (UTC+01:00)	Charles 19', 68'; Young 56'; Stenning 117'	Report	Blanchflower; Coupar; Hewitt	Stadium: Mile End Stadium

25 August 2019	Maidenhead United (SW1)	1–5	Cardiff City (S)	Holyport
14:00 BST (UTC+01:00)	O'Brien 41'	Report	Horrell 1'; Lloyd 17', 67'; Williams 55'; Isaac 88'	Stadium: Summerleaze Park

25 August 2019	Oxford United (S)	0–1	Crawley Wasps (S)	Marston
14:00 BST (UTC+01:00)		Report	Cole 84'	Stadium: Marsh Lane

25 August 2019	Portsmouth (S)	2–0 (a.e.t.)	Watford (S)	Portsmouth
14:00 BST (UTC+01:00)	De Bunsen 93'; Bath 97'	Report		Stadium: Kendall Stadium; Attendance: 143

25 August 2019	Southampton (SW1)	6–0	Ipswich Town (SE1)	Totton
14:00 BST (UTC+01:00)	Pusey 16'; Pharoah 29'; Ware 36', 43', 59'; Williams 64'	Report		Stadium: Testwood Stadium; Attendance: 161

25 August 2019	Southampton Women (SW1)	2–0	Poole Town (SW1)	Romsey
14:00 BST (UTC+01:00)	Angel 43'; Holden 84'	Report		Stadium: The Bypass Ground

25 August 2019	Stevenage (SE1)	0–7	Yeovil Town (S)	Letchworth
14:00 BST (UTC+01:00)		Report	Ann-Marie Heatherson Heatherson 21'; Dudley-Jones 37', 47', 56'; Wiltshire 39' (pen.), 64'; Wood 76'	Stadium: County Ground

25 August 2019	Swindon Town (SW1)	0–4	Milton Keynes Dons (S)	Fairford
14:00 BST (UTC+01:00)		Report	Chiarizia; Gooderham; Littlechild 60', 75'	Stadium: Cinder Lane

4 September 2019	Actonians (SE1)	2–0	AFC Wimbledon (SE1)	Northolt
19:45 BST (UTC+01:00)	Ishmael 1'; Barreca 52'	Report		Stadium: Rectory Park; Attendance: 56

Hounslow (S)	A–W	Gillingham (S)
	Report

=== Preliminary round ===
==== Northern section ====
15 September 2019	Norton & Stockton Ancients (N1)	4–2	Bedworth United (M1)	Stockton-on-Tees
14:00 BST (UTC+01:00)	Dryden; Marshall; Owens	Report	Dhillon; Farnsworth	Stadium: Norton Teesside Sports Complex

22 September 2019	Sunderland (N)	2–0	Burnley (N)	Hetton-le-Hole
14:00 BST (UTC+01:00)	Brown; Farrugia	Report		Stadium: Eppleton Colliery Welfare Ground

==== Southern section ====
15 September 2019	Portsmouth (S)	3–2 (a.e.t.)	Gillingham (S)	Portsmouth
14:00 BST (UTC+01:00)	Ingram 49'; Widdows 75'; True 110'	Report	Goal	Stadium: Kendall Stadium; Attendance: 138

Chesham United (SW1)	H–W	Keynsham Town (S)
	Report

=== First round ===
==== Northern section ====
13 October 2019	Barnsley (N1)	0–1	Sunderland (N)	Barnsley
15:00 BST (UTC+01:00)		Report	Ramshaw	Stadium: Barnsley FC Academy; Attendance: 100

13 October 2019	Birmingham & West Midlands (M1)	1–2	Stoke City (N)	Boldmere
14:00 BST (UTC+01:00)	Lundle 72'	Report	Hall 79'; Gibson 86'	Stadium: Trevor Brown Memorial Ground

13 October 2019	Fylde (N)	2–3 (a.e.t.)	Wolverhampton Wanderers (M1)	Medlar-with-Wesham
14:00 BST (UTC+01:00)	Merrin 36'; Redgrave 110'	Report	Palmer 29'; Barnett 110'; Morphet 120'	Stadium: Mill Farm

13 October 2019	Huddersfield Town (N)	7–2	Sheffield F.C. (N)	Kirkburton
14:00 BST (UTC+01:00)	Nutter 18'; Danby 25'; Embley 38', 55'; Sowerby 45+2', 62'; White 85'	Report	Johnson 20'; Goodwin 45'	Stadium: The Stafflex Arena

20 October 2019	Brighouse Town (N1)	1–0	Norton & Stockton Ancients (N1)	Brighouse
14:00 BST (UTC+01:00)	Cass	Report		Stadium: The Yorkshire Payments Stadium

20 October 2019	Derby County (N)	10–1	The New Saints (M1)	Mickleover
14:00 BST (UTC+01:00)	Keryakoplis 4', 45+4', 68', 74'; Gilliatt 32', 88'; Domingo 45+5'; Sims 57'; Watson 66'; Rai 76'	Report	Griffiths	Stadium: Mickleover Sports Club

24 November 2019	Chorley (N1)	4–3	Durham Cestria (N1)	Chorley
14:00 GMT (UTC±00:00)	Searson 45'; Donoghue 46'; Rotherham 86'; Kemp 90'	Report	Purdham; Robson; Ryan	Stadium: Victory Park Stadium

24 November 2019	Long Eaton United (M1)	2–4	Liverpool Feds (N1)	Long Eaton
14:00 GMT (UTC±00:00)	Fulgar; Sears	Report	Mortimer 23'; Seagraves 40'; Cole 44'; Lee 54'	Stadium: Grange Park

==== Southern section ====
13 October 2019	Cardiff City (S)	0–0 (a.e.t.) (1–3 p)	Milton Keynes Dons (S)	Ystrad Mynach
14:00 BST (UTC+01:00)		Report		Stadium: CCB Centre for Sporting Excellence

13 October 2019	Enfield Town (SE1)	2–2 (a.e.t.) (2–4 p)	Yeovil Town (S)	Enfield
14:00 BST (UTC+01:00)	Lumsden 46'; Kosky 87'	Report	Dudley-Jones 30'; Wiltshire 70'	Stadium: Queen Elizabeth II Stadium

13 October 2019	Southampton Women (SW1)	2–3	AFC Basildon (SE1)	Winklebury
14:00 BST (UTC+01:00)	Vokes 29', 72'	Report	Turner; Spencer-Webb	Stadium: Winklebury Football Complex

20 October 2019	Billericay Town (SE1)	4–0	Cambridge City (SE1)	Billericay
14:00 BST (UTC+01:00)	Morgan; H. Smith; P. Smith	Report		Stadium: New Lodge

20 October 2019	Crawley Wasps (S)	1–0	Actonians (SE1)	Steyning
14:00 BST (UTC+01:00)	Palmer 48'	Report		Stadium: The Shooting Field

20 October 2019	Larkhall Athletic (SW1)	1–3	Southampton (SW1)	Bath
14:00 BST (UTC+01:00)	Hooper 49'	Report	Williams 41', 60', 90+3'	Stadium: Plain Ham; Attendance: 40

20 October 2019	Leyton Orient (SE1)	1–6	Portsmouth (S)	Mile End
14:00 BST (UTC+01:00)	Charles 13'	Report	Currie 17'; True 34', 38'; Bath 52'; Widdows 66'; Bradley 80'	Stadium: Mile End Stadium

1 December 2019	Chesham United (SW1)	4–0	Exeter City (SW1)	Chesham
14:00 GMT (UTC±00:00)	R. Fraser 2', 14'; G. Fraser 20', 28'	Report		Stadium: The Meadow

=== Second round ===
==== Northern section ====
24 November 2019	Brighouse Town (N1)	1–1 (a.e.t.) (0–3 p)	Derby County (N)	Brighouse
14:00 GMT (UTC±00:00)	Cass 71' (pen.)	Report	Gilliatt 11'	Stadium: The Yorkshire Payments Stadium; Attendance: 109

24 November 2019	Stoke City (N)	3–2	Wolverhampton Wanderers (M1)	Trent Vale
14:00 GMT (UTC±00:00)	Bowyer 8'; McCoy 79'; Hunt 86'	Report	Palmer 38', 90' (pen.)	Stadium: Clayton Wood Training Ground

22 December 2019	Chorley (N1)	0–4	Sunderland (N)	Skelmersdale
14:00 GMT (UTC±00:00)		Report	Farrugia 34', 41'; Ramshaw 37'; Galloway 64'	Stadium: JMO Sports Park

22 December 2019	Huddersfield Town (N)	4–2	Liverpool Feds (N1)	Kirkburton
14:00 GMT (UTC±00:00)	Sowerby 29', 34'; Elford 58', 86'	Report	Goal	Stadium: The Stafflex Arena

==== Southern section ====
24 November 2019	AFC Basildon (SE1)	3–3 (a.e.t.) (0–3 p)	Milton Keynes Dons (S)	Canvey Island
14:00 GMT (UTC±00:00)	Gillard; Turner; Wealthall	Report	Driscoll; Rush	Stadium: Park Lane

24 November 2019	Yeovil Town (S)	1–2 (a.e.t.)	Southampton (SW1)	Dorchester
15:00 GMT (UTC±00:00)	Wiltshire 12'	Report	Pusey 47'; Pharoah 98'	Stadium: The Avenue Stadium

15 December 2019	Chesham United (SW1)	1–0	Billericay Town (SE1)	Chesham
14:00 GMT (UTC±00:00)	G. Fraser 40'	Report		Stadium: The Meadow; Attendance: 62

22 December 2019	Crawley Wasps (S)	1–2	Portsmouth (S)	Lancing
14:00 GMT (UTC±00:00)	Cole 90+5'	Report	True 9'; McDonnell 65'	Stadium: Culver Road

=== Quarter-finals ===
==== Northern section ====
2 February 2020	Huddersfield Town (N)	1–3	Stoke City (N)	Kirkburton
14:00 GMT (UTC±00:00)	Sowerby 23'	Report	Baptiste 12', 61'; Hughes 51'	Stadium: The Stafflex Arena

2 February 2020	Sunderland (N)	4–0	Derby County (N)	Hetton-le-Hole
14:00 GMT (UTC±00:00)	Brown 51'; Ramshaw 79'; Farrugia 74', 90'	Report		Stadium: Eppleton Colliery Welfare Ground

==== Southern section ====
2 February 2020	Chesham United (SW1)	0–2	Milton Keynes Dons (S)	Chesham
14:00 GMT (UTC±00:00)		Report	Bell; Driscoll	Stadium: The Meadow; Attendance: 60

5 February 2020	Portsmouth (S)	0–2	Southampton F.C. Women (SW1)	Gosport
19:45 GMT (UTC±00:00)		Report	Pusey 15', 45'	Stadium: Privett Park; Attendance: 458

=== Semi-finals ===
16 February 2020	Milton Keynes Dons (S)	0–2	Stoke City (N)	Denbigh
14:00 GMT (UTC±00:00)		Report	Hunt 57'; Gibson 62'	Stadium: Stadium MK; Attendance: 606

23 February 2020	Sunderland (N)	1–0	Southampton (SW1)	Hetton-le-Hole
14:00 GMT (UTC±00:00)	Potts 56'	Report		Stadium: Eppleton Colliery Welfare Ground

=== Final ===
Stoke City (N)	Cancelled	Sunderland (N)
