= Ellen Mary Ann Dunn =

Victorian music hall performer and women's footballer (1879–1934)

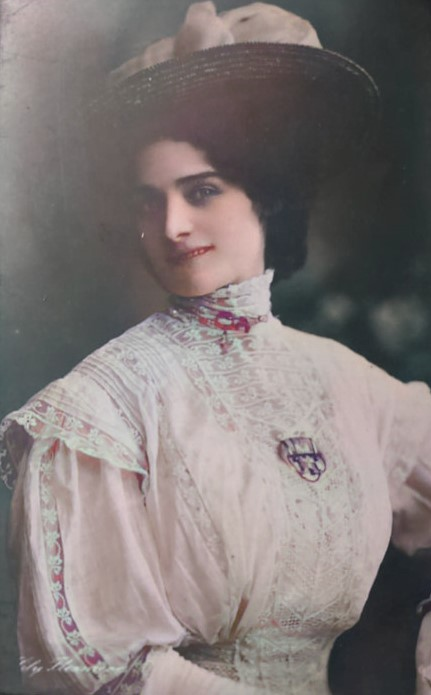
- Ellen Mary Ann Dunn c. 1909
- Born: 25 February 1879; Islington, London, England
- Died: 19 January 1934 (aged 54); Highgate Hill, London, England
- Other names: Lily Flexmore; Ruth Coupland
- Occupations: Acrobatic contortionist, dancer, singer, comedienne
- Years active: 1895–1925
- Known for: Music hall performer; founding player of the British Ladies' Football Club
- Spouse: George Ambrose White (m. 1899; d. 1933)

Ellen Mary Ann Dunn (25 February 1879 – 19 January 1934), known professionally as Lily Flexmore and on the football pitch as Ruth Coupland, was a Victorian music hall performer and one of the founding players of the British Ladies' Football Club, the first organised women's football club in England.

She is recorded in the collections of the National Portrait Gallery, described as a "contortionist, dancer, singer and footballer."

== Biography ==
Ellen Mary Ann Dunn was born on 25 February 1879 at 56 Peerless Street, Islington, London, the second of eleven children of John Dunn, a leather craftsman, and his wife Ellen Dunn (née Dunnell). She grew up in Islington during the height of the music hall era.

By the mid-1890s she was performing under the stage name Lily Flexmore as an acrobatic contortionist, singer and comedienne. Her act was built around an extreme acrobatic sequence involving seizing her garter between her teeth while singing. A trade advertisement of April 1898 billed her as "The Champion Acrobatic Dancer of the World," confirming she had recently returned from a tour of South Africa.

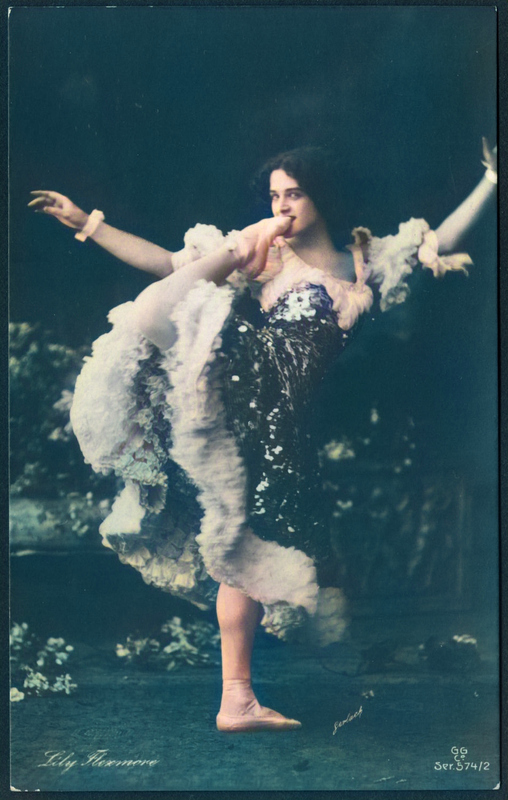
Colourised image of Lily Flexmore performing her signature toe-in-mouth dance

Her career extended internationally over three decades. She performed in the United States on the Orpheum Circuit, appearing at venues including the Orpheum Theatre, Memphis, in March 1908, billed as "The Extraordinary Girl." A caricature of Lily Flexmore appeared alongside George Robey in the Newcastle Daily Chronicle in March 1906. In June 1911, Reynolds's Newspaper published her photograph in its "Stageland and Thereabouts" feature, identifying her as appearing at the Shepherd's Bush Empire.

Ellen married comedian George Ambrose White, who performed as George Flexmore, in Bethnal Green on February 27th, 1899. She continued performing into the 1920s. George White died in September 1933. Ellen died on 19 January 1934 of pneumonia at St Mary's Hospital, Highgate Hill, London.

== Women's football ==
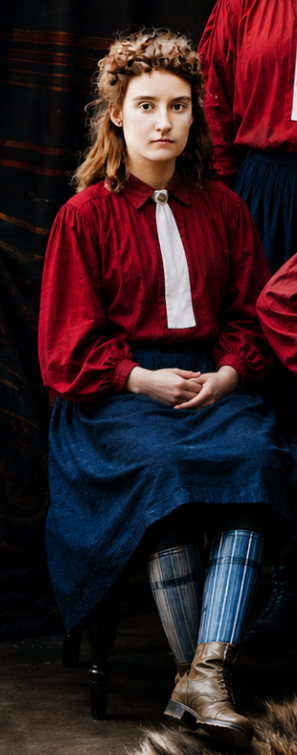
Ellen Dunn in North London Football team gear

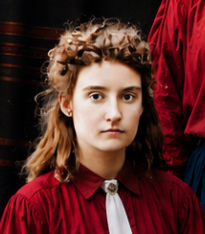
Ellen Dunn in North London British Ladies Football team kit

The British Ladies' Football Club was founded in late 1894, with its inaugural match held on 23 March 1895 at Crouch End Athletic Ground, Hornsey, London, drawing over 10,000 spectators. Ellen played for the North London team under the pseudonym Ruth Coupland. Jean Williams, citing the Lloyd's Weekly Newspaper report of 31 March 1895, records the North team lineup as including Ruth Coupland alongside Mrs Graham, Nettie J. Honeyball, Lily Lynn, and others. North defeated South 7–1.

Patrick Brennan, a specialist researcher on the history of the British Ladies' Football Club, records Ruth Coupland in the published North London team lineup for the Crouch End match.

The choice of pseudonym was common among the players, several of whom had theatrical connections and used assumed names to keep their stage and sporting identities separate. Ellen's identity as Ruth Coupland remained unknown for over a century. Her identification was established by sports historian Stuart Gibbs through the cross-referencing of music hall records with football records. The name Ruth Coupland also appears in the Belfast News-Letter published team lineup for the club's Irish tour match at Cliftonville on 20 June 1895.

== Legacy ==
Ellen Mary Ann Dunn is among the few women documented as both a professional music hall performer of international standing and a founding player of organised women's football in England. The inaugural match of the British Ladies' Football Club on 23 March 1895 predated the establishment of most national women's football programmes by several decades.

She is recorded in the collections of the National Portrait Gallery.

== See also ==
- British Ladies' Football Club
- Nettie Honeyball
- Lady Florence Dixie
- Music hall
