= 2018–19 FA Women's National League Cup =

Tournament details
- Country: England
- Teams: 72

Final positions
- Champions: Blackburn Rovers
- Runners-up: Crawley Wasps

Tournament statistics
- Matches played: 70
- Goals scored: 307 (4.39 per match)
- All statistics correct as of 19:55, 28 April 2019 (UTC).

The 2018–19 FA Women's National League Cup is the 28th running of the FA Women's National League Cup, which began in 1991. It is the first since a restructure and rebranding of the top four tiers of English football by The Football Association. It is the major League Cup competition run by the FA Women's National League, and for the fifth season it is being run alongside their secondary League Cup competition, the National League Plate.

All 72 National League clubs entered at the Determining round, with the winners continuing in the competition and the losers going into the National League Plate tournament. Blackburn Rovers is the reigning champions, having defeated Leicester City Women's 3–1 the previous season.

== Results ==
All results listed are published by The Football Association. Games are listed by round in chronological order, and then in alphabetical order of the home team where matches were played simultaneously.

The division each team play in is indicated in brackets after their name: (S)=Southern Division; (N)=Northern Division; (SW1)=Division One South West; (SE1)=Division One South East; (M1)=Division One Midlands; (N1)=Division One North.

=== Determining round ===
The competition begins with a Determining Round, which consisted of all 72 teams in the FA Women's National League being drawn in pairs. The winners of these 36 games progress to the next stage of the competition, while the losers qualify for the 2018–19 FA Women's National League Plate.

2 September 2018	Actonians (SE1)	1–2	Oxford United (S)	Northolt
14:00 BST (UTC+01:00)	Barreca 82'	Report	Noble 26', 63'	Stadium: Rectory Park; Attendance: 20

2 September 2018	Barnsley (N1)	3–4	Bolton Wanderers (N1)	Barnsley
14:00 BST (UTC+01:00)	Woodhouse 2'; Woodruff 15'; Smith 18'	Report	Newhouse 4', 60'; Worthington 80', 88'	Stadium: Middlecliffe Lane; Attendance: 50

2 September 2018	Billericay Town (SE1)	10–1	Maidenhead United (SW1)	Billericay
14:00 BST (UTC+01:00)	Blackie 13', 45'; Rodney 22', 52', 61'; Pittuck 26', 39', 54'; Rushen 59'; Piggott 86'	Report	Dover 30'	Stadium: AGP Arena; Attendance: 100

2 September 2018	Blackburn Rovers (N)	3–3 (a.e.t.) (5–4 p)	Liverpool Feds (N1)	Bamber Bridge
14:00 BST (UTC+01:00)	Donoghue 12', 77'; Jordan 84'	Report	Rogers 3', 23'; Devereaux 59'	Stadium: Sir Tom Finney Stadium

2 September 2018	Buckland Athletic (SW1)	3–0	Brislington (SW1)	Newton Abbot
14:00 BST (UTC+01:00)	Butt; Stacey	Report		Stadium: Homers Heath; Attendance: 55

2 September 2018	Cambridge United (SE1)	2–0	C & K Basildon (S)	Mildenhall
14:00 BST (UTC+01:00)	Blanchflower; Burt	Report		Stadium: Recreation Way; Attendance: 75

2 September 2018	Chesham United (SW1)	2–4	Enfield Town (SE1)	Chesham
14:00 BST (UTC+01:00)	Euman; Fraser	Report	Bailey 25'; Degooye 75', 87'; Peters 90'	Stadium: The Meadow

2 September 2018	Coventry United (S)	7–0	Norwich City (SE1)	Coventry
14:00 BST (UTC+01:00)	Wathan 9', 39', 59'; Hughes 17', 75'; Brook 57'; Gauntlett 90+1'	Report		Stadium: Butts Park Arena; Attendance: 93

2 September 2018	Crawley Wasps (SE1)	8–0	Ipswich Town (SE1)	Crawley
14:00 BST (UTC+01:00)	Heather 14'; Webber 23', 43'; Stow 26', 90+2'; Rabson 41'; Carter 73'; Cole 89'	Report		Stadium: Tinsley Lane; Attendance: 60

2 September 2018	Derby County (N)	3–1	Bedworth United (M1)	Derby
14:00 BST (UTC+01:00)	Smith 80', 83'; Redgrave 90'	Report	Walsh	Stadium: The Don Amott Arena

2 September 2018	Doncaster Rovers Belles (N)	2–2 (a.e.t.) (3–4 p)	Chorley (N1)	Doncaster
14:00 BST (UTC+01:00)	Goal	Report	Walker 8'; Kemp 64'	Stadium: Oxford Street

2 September 2018	Fylde (N)	9–0	Burton Albion (M1)	Blackpool
14:00 BST (UTC+01:00)	Berko; Charlton; Forster; Merrin; Staunton-Turner; Hollinshead; Young	Report		Stadium: School Road

2 September 2018	Guiseley Vixens (N)	4–2	Chester Le Street (N1)	Guiseley
14:00 BST (UTC+01:00)	Auker 10', 32'; Olds 16'; Walton 85'	Report	Thompson-Clarke 18'; Havery 41'	Stadium: Nethermoor Park

2 September 2018	Huddersfield Town (N)	3–0	Middlesbrough (N)	Kirkburton
14:00 BST (UTC+01:00)	Sanderson 12', 88'; Danby 70'	Report		Stadium: The Stafflex Arena; Attendance: 76

2 September 2018	Hull City (N)	2–1	Bradford City (N)	Hull
14:00 BST (UTC+01:00)	Knight; Beech	Report	Lambert 43'	Stadium: Hull University Sports Ground

2 September 2018	Larkhall Athletic (SW1)	3–2	Keynsham Town (SW1)	Larkhall
14:00 BST (UTC+01:00)	Barrett; O'Hara Nash	Report	Bartlett 29'; Williams 54'	Stadium: Plain Ham

2 September 2018	Long Eaton United (M1)	3–4	Norton & Stockton Ancients (N1)	Long Eaton
14:00 BST (UTC+01:00)	Arber; Harford	Report	Owens 5'; Atkinson 37', 43'; Corrie 54'	Stadium: Grange Park; Attendance: 42

2 September 2018	Loughborough Foxes (S)	4–0	Denham United (SE1)	Loughborough
14:00 BST (UTC+01:00)	Rogers 25'; Dexter 47'; Cooper 73'; Chambers 79'	Report		Stadium: Loughborough University Stadium; Attendance: 40

2 September 2018	Luton Town (SE1)	1–3	Cheltenham Town (SW1)	Luton
14:00 BST (UTC+01:00)	Henman	Report	Leask; Martin	Stadium: Stockwood Park Athletics Stadium

2 September 2018	Morecambe (N1)	0–5	Sunderland (N)	Lancaster
14:00 BST (UTC+01:00)		Report	Galloway; Griffiths; Hutchinson; Ramshaw; Gibson	Stadium: Lancaster and Morecambe College; Attendance: 40

2 September 2018	Nettleham (M1)	1–2	Birmingham & West Midlands (M1)	Nettleham
14:00 BST (UTC+01:00)	Murrell	Report	Fisher 72'; Gibson 90+2'	Stadium: Mulsanne Park; Attendance: 60

2 September 2018	Plymouth Argyle (S)	4–2	Milton Keynes Dons (S)	Plymouth
14:00 BST (UTC+01:00)	Knapman 5'; Pollock 26'; Lane 44'; Dandridge 52'	Report	Farrow; Newman	Stadium: Haye Road; Attendance: 46

2 September 2018	Poole Town (SW1)	1–2	Watford (S)	Poole
14:00 BST (UTC+01:00)	Rolfe-Hawkins 33'	Report	Afuakwah 25'; Jones 87' (o.g.)	Stadium: County Ground; Attendance: 40

2 September 2018	Portsmouth (S)	2–4	Chichester City (S)	Portsmouth
14:00 BST (UTC+01:00)	Albuery; Eadon	Report	Melton; Ogle; Widdows	Stadium: Kendall's Stadium; Attendance: 195

2 September 2018	Queens Park Rangers (S)	3–1	Gillingham (S)	West Drayton, London
14:00 BST (UTC+01:00)	Ward-Chambers 19', 90+5'; Kumaning 70'	Report	Bussey	Stadium: Honeycroft

2 September 2018	Solihull (M1)	0–7	Brighouse Town (N1)	Birmingham
14:00 BST (UTC+01:00)		Report	Proud 13', 20', 49', 80'; Pearson 31'; Poulter 58'; Housecroft 70'	Stadium: West Midland Sports & Social Club; Attendance: 45

2 September 2018	Southampton Saints (SW1)	0–1	AFC Wimbledon (SE1)	Sholing
14:00 BST (UTC+01:00)		Report	Trimnell 87'	Stadium: Universal Stadium; Attendance: 25

2 September 2018	Sporting Khalsa (M1)	1–2	Leeds United (N1)	Willenhall
14:00 BST (UTC+01:00)	Walker	Report	Campbell; Smith	Stadium: The Aspray Arena; Attendance: 30

2 September 2018	Steel City Wanderers (M1)	1–6	Newcastle United (N1)	Sheffield
14:00 BST (UTC+01:00)	Middleton	Report	Cochrane; Gray; Mckenzie; Turnbull	Stadium: St George's Park Thorncliffe; Attendance: 38

2 September 2018	Stevenage (SE1)	1–4	Cardiff City (S)	Hertford
14:00 BST (UTC+01:00)	Emmings	Report	Williams 9'; Lawrence 13'; Issac 22'; Horrell 46'	Stadium: Hertingfordbury Park; Attendance: 30

2 September 2018	Stoke City (N)	3–0	Sheffield (N)	Stoke-on-Trent
14:00 BST (UTC+01:00)	Keryakoplis 55', 73'; Hyde 66'	Report		Stadium: Community Drive

2 September 2018	Swindon Town (SW1)	1–5	Leyton Orient (SE1)	Fairford
14:00 BST (UTC+01:00)	Picton 60'	Report	Fulgence 5', 75'; Barton 30'; Griffiths 35'; Le Marchand 65'	Stadium: Cinder Lane; Attendance: 43

2 September 2018	The New Saints (M1)	0–3	Nottingham Forest (N)	Oswestry
14:00 BST (UTC+01:00)		Report	Middleton 13', 32', 64'	Stadium: Park Hall Stadium; Attendance: 53

2 September 2018	West Bromwich Albion (M1)	0–3	Burnley (N1)	Sutton Coldfield
14:00 BST (UTC+01:00)		Report	Embley 51', 73'	Stadium: Trevor Brown Memorial Ground

2 September 2018	Wolverhampton Wanderers (M1)	1–0	Crewe Alexandra (N1)	Bilston
14:00 BST (UTC+01:00)	Cross 16'	Report		Stadium: Queen Street Stadium; Attendance: 98

Walkover	St Nicholas (SW1)	A–W	Southampton Women's (SW1)	Yate
		Report		Stadium: Lodge Road

=== First round ===
With 36 teams progressing from the determining round, four needed to be eliminated to allow a single-elimination knockout tournament to take place. Twenty eight of the winners from the determining round were given byes to the second round, with eight teams being drawn against each other in first round ties.

30 September 2018	AFC Wimbledon (SE1)	4–0	Buckland Athletic (SW1)	Sutton
14:00 BST (UTC+01:00)	Tully 21'; Quinn-Low 29'; Nagle 66'; Heasman 85'	Report		Stadium: War Memorial Sports Ground; Attendance: 100

30 September 2018	Enfield Town (SE1)	3–4	Southampton Women's (SW1)	Enfield
14:00 BST (UTC+01:00)	McKevitt 6'; Degooye 53'; Peters 74'	Report	Tonks 22'; Bavister 38'; Yeates 47'; Lee-Stewart 87'	Stadium: Queen Elizabeth II Stadium; Attendance: 45

30 September 2018	Guiseley Vixens (N)	1–2	Blackburn Rovers (N)	Guiseley
14:00 BST (UTC+01:00)	Durkin	Report	Jordan 3', 35'	Stadium: Nethermoor Park; Attendance: 45

30 September 2018	Newcastle United (N1)	1–2 (a.e.t.)	Chorley (N1)	Newcastle upon Tyne
14:00 BST (UTC+01:00)	McKenzie	Report	Wild 4'; Nickson 98'	Stadium: Druid Park

=== Second round ===
14 October 2018	Billericay Town (SE1)	0–2	Chichester City (S)	Billericay
14:00 BST (UTC+01:00)		Report	Clark; Wride	Stadium: AGP Arena

14 October 2018	Blackburn Rovers (N)	3–2	Fylde (N)	Accrington
14:00 BST (UTC+01:00)	Fenton 58'; Jordan 52'; Holbrook 76'	Report	Wild 12'; Carroll 70'	Stadium: Accrington & Rossendale Sports College

14 October 2018	Brighouse Town (N1)	1–2	Leeds United (N1)	Brighouse
14:00 BST (UTC+01:00)	Pearson 55'	Report	Stamp 36'; Campbell 67'	Stadium: The Yorkshire Payments Stadium

14 October 2018	Cardiff City (S)	5–3	Cheltenham Town (SW1)	Ystrad Mynach
14:00 BST (UTC+01:00)	Horrell; Issac; Williams	Report	Hitchcox; Martin	Stadium: CCB Centre for Sporting Excellence

14 October 2018	Derby County (N)	1–2	Bolton Wanderers (N1)	Derby
14:00 BST (UTC+01:00)	Newton 78'	Report	Newhouse 3', 15'	Stadium: The Don Amott Arena

14 October 2018	Huddersfield Town (N)	1–0	Burnley (N1)	Kirkburton
14:00 BST (UTC+01:00)	Mallin 90+2'	Report		Stadium: The Stafflex Arena; Attendance: 47

14 October 2018	Hull City (N)	2–1 (a.e.t.)	Birmingham & West Midlands (M1)	Hull
14:00 BST (UTC+01:00)	Beech; Symington	Report	Gallop 90'	Stadium: Hull University Sports Ground

14 October 2018	Larkhall Athletic (SW1)	2–3 (a.e.t.)	AFC Wimbledon (SE1)	Larkhall
14:00 BST (UTC+01:00)	O'Hara Nash; Sartain	Report	Stanley 34'; Bisson 47'; Trimnell 116'	Stadium: Plain Ham

14 October 2018	Nottingham Forest (N)	2–0	Chorley (N1)	Carlton
14:00 BST (UTC+01:00)	Adam 13'; Parnell 82'	Report		Stadium: Stokeld Stadium

14 October 2018	Oxford United (S)	1–3 (a.e.t.)	Crawley Wasps (SE1)	Marston
14:00 BST (UTC+01:00)	Goal	Report	Cole 90+2'; Plewa 93'; Heather 100'	Stadium: Marsh Lane

14 October 2018	Queens Park Rangers (S)	1–3	Loughborough Foxes (S)	West Drayton, London
14:00 BST (UTC+01:00)	Wilson 35'	Report	Steele 52'; Rogers 85'; McGrother 90+5'	Stadium: Honeycroft

14 October 2018	Stoke City (N)	3–0	Norton & Stockton Ancients (N1)	Stoke-on-Trent
14:00 BST (UTC+01:00)	Hudson 12'; Keryakoplis 37', 89'	Report		Stadium: Community Drive

14 October 2018	Watford (S)	2–3	Coventry United (S)	Kings Langley
14:00 BST (UTC+01:00)	Ward 64'; O'Leary 74'	Report	Gauntlett 20'; Jefferies 48'; Brook 74'	Stadium: CRY Community Stadium

14 October 2018	Wolverhampton Wanderers (M1)	1–4	Sunderland (N)	Wolverhampton
14:00 BST (UTC+01:00)	Criddle 70'	Report	Hutchinson; Young	Stadium: Castlecroft Stadium; Attendance: 90

28 October 2018	Cambridge United (SE1)	3–0	Leyton Orient (SE1)	Mildenhall
14:00 GMT (UTC+00:00)	Jenkins	Report		Stadium: Recreation Way

28 October 2018	Southampton Women's (SW1)	1–3	Plymouth Argyle (S)	Southampton
14:00 GMT (UTC+00:00)	Bavister 59'	Report	Bleazard 36'; Jones 84', 90+1'	Stadium: Gang Warily Recreation Ground

=== Third round ===
9 December 2018	AFC Wimbledon (SE1)	2–1	Cambridge United (SE1)	Sutton
14:00 GMT (UTC+00:00)	Nagle 39'; Bisson 41'	Report	Jenkins	Stadium: War Memorial Sports Ground; Attendance: 70

9 December 2018	Blackburn Rovers (N)	3–1	Sunderland (N)	Bamber Bridge
14:00 GMT (UTC+00:00)	Jordan 54'; Flint 74', 81'	Report	Hutchinson	Stadium: Sir Tom Finney Stadium

9 December 2018	Cardiff City (S)	3–4 (a.e.t.)	Loughborough Foxes (S)	Ystrad Mynach
14:00 GMT (UTC+00:00)	Horrell; Nolan; Williams	Report	Matlock 62'; Chambers 79'; Dexter 88'; Knight 96'	Stadium: CCB Centre for Sporting Excellence; Attendance: 115

9 December 2018	Huddersfield Town (N)	4–1	Nottingham Forest (N)	Kirkburton
14:00 GMT (UTC+00:00)	Sowerby 35', 90+2'; Sanderson 53'; Mallin 58'	Report	Middleton 45'	Stadium: The Stafflex Arena

9 December 2018	Stoke City (N)	6–3	Leeds United (N1)	Stoke-on-Trent
14:00 GMT (UTC+00:00)	Hyde 10'; Hayes 76'; McCoy 59'; Keryakoplis 61'; Hughes 90+4'	Report	Thompson 5'; Davies 67', 74'	Stadium: Community Drive

13 January 2019	Plymouth Argyle (S)	3–5 (a.e.t.)	Crawley Wasps (SE1)	Newton Abbot
13:00 GMT (UTC+00:00)	Lane 79'; Middleton 90+4'; Burridge 100'	Report	Heather 40'; Webber 67', 95', 112'; Rabson 110'	Stadium: Devon County FA HQ

13 January 2019	Bolton Wanderers (N1)	3–1 (a.e.t.)	Hull City (N)	Atherton
14:00 GMT (UTC+00:00)	Newhouse 55', 100', 118'	Report	Smith	Stadium: Kensite Stadium

13 January 2019	Chichester City (S)	0–2	Coventry United (S)	Chichester
14:00 GMT (UTC+00:00)		Report	Merritt 39'; Hughes 52'	Stadium: Oaklands Park

=== Quarter-finals ===
17 February 2018	Bolton Wanderers (N1)	1–1 (a.e.t.) (5–3 p)	Stoke City (N)	Atherton
14:00 GMT (UTC+00:00)	Havelin 90'	Report	Hayes 20'	Stadium: Kensite Stadium

17 February 2018	Loughborough Foxes (S)	3–0	AFC Wimbledon (SE1)	Loughborough
14:00 GMT (UTC+00:00)	Cooper 39'; McGrother 48', 90+2'	Report		Stadium: Loughborough University Stadium; Attendance: 86

24 February 2018	Coventry United (S)	1–2	Crawley Wasps (SE1)	Daventry
14:00 GMT (UTC+00:00)	Merrick	Report	Webber 37'; James 57'	Stadium: Elderstubbs

24 February 2018	Huddersfield Town (N)	1–3	Blackburn Rovers (N)	Kirkburton
14:00 GMT (UTC+00:00)	Sowerby 43'	Report	Makin 53'; Jordan 69'	Stadium: The Stafflex Arena

=== Semi-finals ===
3 March 2018	Blackburn Rovers (N)	4–0	Loughborough Foxes (S)	Bamber Bridge
14:00 GMT (UTC+00:00)	Makin 57', 73'; Flint 58'; Jordan 67'	Report		Stadium: Sir Tom Finney Stadium

3 March 2018	Crawley Wasps (SE1)	1–0	Bolton Wanderers (N1)	Crawley
14:00 GMT (UTC+00:00)	55' (o.g.)	Report		Stadium: Tinsley Lane

=== Final ===
28 April 2018
14:00 BST (UTC+01:00)

Crawley Wasps (SE1)	0–3	Blackburn Rovers (N)
	Report	Jordan 8', 81'; Flint 52'

Pirelli Stadium, Burton upon Trent
Attendance: 227
