= 2019–20 FA Women's National League Plate =

WNL Plate

Tournament details
- Country: England
- Teams: 34

Final positions
- Champions: None awarded (final cancelled)
- Runners-up: None awarded (final cancelled)

Tournament statistics
- Matches played: 32
- Goals scored: 147 (4.59 per match)
- All statistics correct as of 09:07, 9 March 2020 (UTC).

The 2019–20 FA Women's National League Plate is the sixth running of the competition, which began in 2014. It is the secondary League Cup competition run by the FA Women's National League (FA WNL), and is run in parallel with the league's primary League Cup competition, the National League Cup.

The teams that take part in the WNL plate are decided after the determining round of the WNL Cup. The winners of determining round matches continue in the WNL Cup, while the losers move into the WNL Plate. Seventy of the 71 National League clubs were included in the determining round draw, with Larkhall Athletic being granted a bye due to there being an odd number of teams in the competition. Hounslow withdrew from the competition after the draw, meaning 34 teams were entered into this season's WNL plate.

West Bromwich Albion are the reigning champions, having defeated Liverpool Feds 5–1 in the 2018–19 final.

== Results ==
All results listed are published by The Football Association. Games are listed by round in date order, and then in alphabetical order of the home team where matches were played on the same day.

The division each team play in is indicated in brackets after their name: (S)=Southern Division; (N)=Northern Division; (SW1)=Division One South West; (SE1)=Division One South East; (M1)=Division One Midlands; (N1)=Division One North.

=== Preliminary round ===
Thirty-four teams entered the competition after losing in the League Cup determining round, sixteen of which were in the southern section and eighteen in the northern section. This meant that two preliminary matches were required so that sixteen teams from each area could play in the first round.

==== Northern section ====
15 September 2019	Burton Albion (M1)	3–0	Solihull Moors (M1)	Rocester
14:00 BST (UTC+01:00)	Rothery 22'; Da'Casto 44', 73'	Report		Stadium: Hillsfield

15 September 2019	Lincoln City (M1)	1–2	West Bromwich Albion (N)	Lincoln
14:00 BST (UTC+01:00)	4' (o.g.)	Report	Arber; Murray	Stadium: Ashby Avenue

=== First round ===
==== Northern section ====
13 October 2019	Bolton Wanderers (N1)	6–1	Doncaster Rovers Belles (M1)	Atherton
14:00 BST (UTC+01:00)	Foster 20'; Slade 30', 37'; Havelin 41'; Battle 54'; Lysons 77'	Report	Bethell	Stadium: Alder House; Attendance: 75

13 October 2019	Chester-le-Street (N1)	2–6	Nottingham Forest (N)	Chester-le-Street
14:00 BST (UTC+01:00)	Havery 2', 27' (pen.)	Report	Dalton 22'; Hamilton 31', 74'; Casper 46', 80'; Harkin 67'	Stadium: Moor Park

13 October 2019	Middlesbrough (N1)	5–1	Hull City (N)	Billingham
14:00 BST (UTC+01:00)	Date; Dodds; McQuade	Report	Lynskey 25'	Stadium: Bedford Terrace

13 October 2019	Newcastle United (N1)	2–1 (a.e.t.)	Loughborough Foxes (N)	Newcastle upon Tyne
14:00 BST (UTC+01:00)	Foster; Ord	Report	Young 28'	Stadium: Whitley Park; Attendance: 86

20 October 2019	Sporting Khalsa (M1)	0–2	Stockport County (N1)	Willenhall
14:00 BST (UTC+01:00)		Report	Mapp; Porteous-Williams	Stadium: Aspray Arena

27 October 2019	West Bromwich Albion (N)	6–1	Burton Albion (M1)	Walsall Wood
14:00 GMT (UTC±00:00)	Arber; Rogers	Report	Rothery	Stadium: Oak Park

3 November 2019	Leeds United (N1)	4–1	Bradford City (N1)	Wetherby
15:00 GMT (UTC±00:00)	Brown 30'; Hunt 53', 63' (pen.); Cassidy 55'	Report	40' (o.g.)	Stadium: Thorp Arch

1 December 2019	Leicester United (M1)	1–2	Leafield Athletic (M1)	Melton Mowbray
14:00 GMT (UTC±00:00)	Cocking	Report	Harris; Rogers	Stadium: Melton Sports Village; Attendance: 35

==== Southern section ====
6 October 2019	Buckland Athletic (SW1)	1–7	Plymouth Argyle (S)	Newton Abbot
14:00 BST (UTC+01:00)	Stacey 10'	Report	Jones 10'; Knapman 30', 47'; Cunningham 33', 80', 33'; Bleazard 40'	Stadium: Homers Heath

13 October 2019	Chichester City (S)	4–2 (a.e.t.)	Swindon Town (SW1)	Chichester
14:00 BST (UTC+01:00)	Phelps; Simmonds; Staple; Wild	Report	Berry 38'; Larkin 87'	Stadium: Oaklands Park

13 October 2019	Watford (S)	6–1	Kent Football United (SE1)	Kings Langley
15:00 BST (UTC+01:00)	Kos 53', 87'; Harney 55', 67', 85'; Carid 71' (pen.)	Report	Mackley	Stadium: Gaywood Park

20 October 2019	Cheltenham Town (SW1)	7–0	Poole Town (SW1)	Cheltenham
14:00 BST (UTC+01:00)	Bartlett 10', 24'; Martin 28', 88'; Bevan 38'; Brown 41'; Butterfield 50'	Report		Stadium: Petersfield Park

20 October 2019	Ipswich Town (SE1)	2–3	Stevenage (SE1)	Felixstowe
14:00 BST (UTC+01:00)	Cossey 35'; Thomas 37'	Report	Godden; Sibanda; Pope	Stadium: Dellwood Avenue; Attendance: 117

27 October 2019	Cambridge United (SE1)	0–1	Maidenhead United (SW1)	St Neots
14:00 GMT (UTC±00:00)		Report	O'Brien	Stadium: Rowley Park

3 November 2019	Brislington (SW1)	1–2	AFC Wimbledon (SE1)	Keynsham
14:00 GMT (UTC±00:00)	Sawyer 56'	Report	Heasman 40'; Stanley 78'	Stadium: Crown Field

3 November 2019	Oxford United (S)	8–1	Norwich City (SE1)	Marston
14:00 GMT (UTC±00:00)	Baker 7'; Williams 13', 38' (pen.), 56'; Johns 41'; Moore 72'; Timms 77'; Lancaster 90'	Report	Daviss	Stadium: Marsh Lane

=== Second round ===
==== Northern section ====
17 November 2019	Stockport County (N1)	0–7	Middlesbrough (N)	Woodley
14:00 GMT (UTC±00:00)		Report	Dodds; McQuade; Dale	Stadium: Stockport Sports Village

24 November 2019	Bolton Wanderers (N1)	1–0	Newcastle United (N1)	Atherton
14:00 GMT (UTC±00:00)	Hindle	Report		Stadium: Alder House

8 December 2019	Nottingham Forest (N)	3–0	Leeds United (N1)	Eastwood
14:00 GMT (UTC±00:00)	Dexter 41'; Hamilton 47', 51'	Report		Stadium: Coronation Park

22 December 2019	West Bromwich Albion (N)	5–1	Leafield Athletic (M1)	Walsall Wood
14:00 GMT (UTC±00:00)	Davies; James; Arber	Report		Stadium: Oak Park

==== Southern section ====
24 November 2019	Plymouth Argyle (S)	3–1	AFC Wimbledon (SE1)	Plymouth
12:00 GMT (UTC±00:00)	Knapman 11', 18'; Cunningham 20'	Report	Heasman 65'	Stadium: Plymouth Marjon University; Attendance: 108

24 November 2019	Watford (S)	2–1	Oxford United (S)	Kings Langley
15:00 GMT (UTC±00:00)	Hill 85'; Ward 86'	Report	Beaver 44'	Stadium: Gaywood Park

1 December 2019	Stevenage (SE1)	3–2	Maidenhead United (SW1)	Letchworth
15:30 GMT (UTC±00:00)	Sibanda; Knell	Report	Nelson 19', 39'	Stadium: County Ground

15 December 2019	Cheltenham Town (SW1)	0–4	Chichester City (S)	Cheltenham
14:00 GMT (UTC±00:00)		Report	Fox; Phelps; Simmonds	Stadium: Petersfield Park; Attendance: 46

=== Quarter-finals ===
==== Northern section ====
26 January 2020	Middlesbrough (N)	2–1	Nottingham Forest (N)	Billingham
13:00 GMT (UTC±00:00)	Dixon; Luke	Report	Fisher 76'	Stadium: Bedford Terrace

23 February 2020	Bolton Wanderers (N1)	1–4	West Bromwich Albion (N)	Leigh
15:00 GMT (UTC±00:00)	Hindle	Report	Arber; Dugmore; James	Stadium: Leigh Sports Village

==== Southern section ====
26 January 2020	Plymouth Argyle (S)	3–1	Stevenage (SE1)	Plymouth
14:00 GMT (UTC±00:00)	Middleton 19'; Everson 23'; 76' (o.g.)	Report	Emmings 60'	Stadium: Manadon Sports Hub

23 February 2020	Chichester City (S)	0–4	Watford (S)	Havant
17:15 GMT (UTC±00:00)		Report	Beckett 9'; Ward 10'; Chandler 25'; Scanlon 63'	Stadium: Front Lawn Community Hub

=== Semi-finals ===
1 March 2020	Plymouth Argyle (S)	1–2	West Bromwich Albion (N)	Plymouth
14:00 GMT (UTC±00:00)	Bleazard 45+3'	Report	Murray; Nymoen	Stadium: Manadon Sports Hub

8 March 2020	Middlesbrough (N)	0–2	Watford (S)	Billingham
14:00 GMT (UTC±00:00)		Report	Meiwald 73'; Chandler 90'	Stadium: Bedford Terrace

=== Final ===
Watford (S)	Cancelled	West Bromwich Albion (N)
