= Women's football in England =

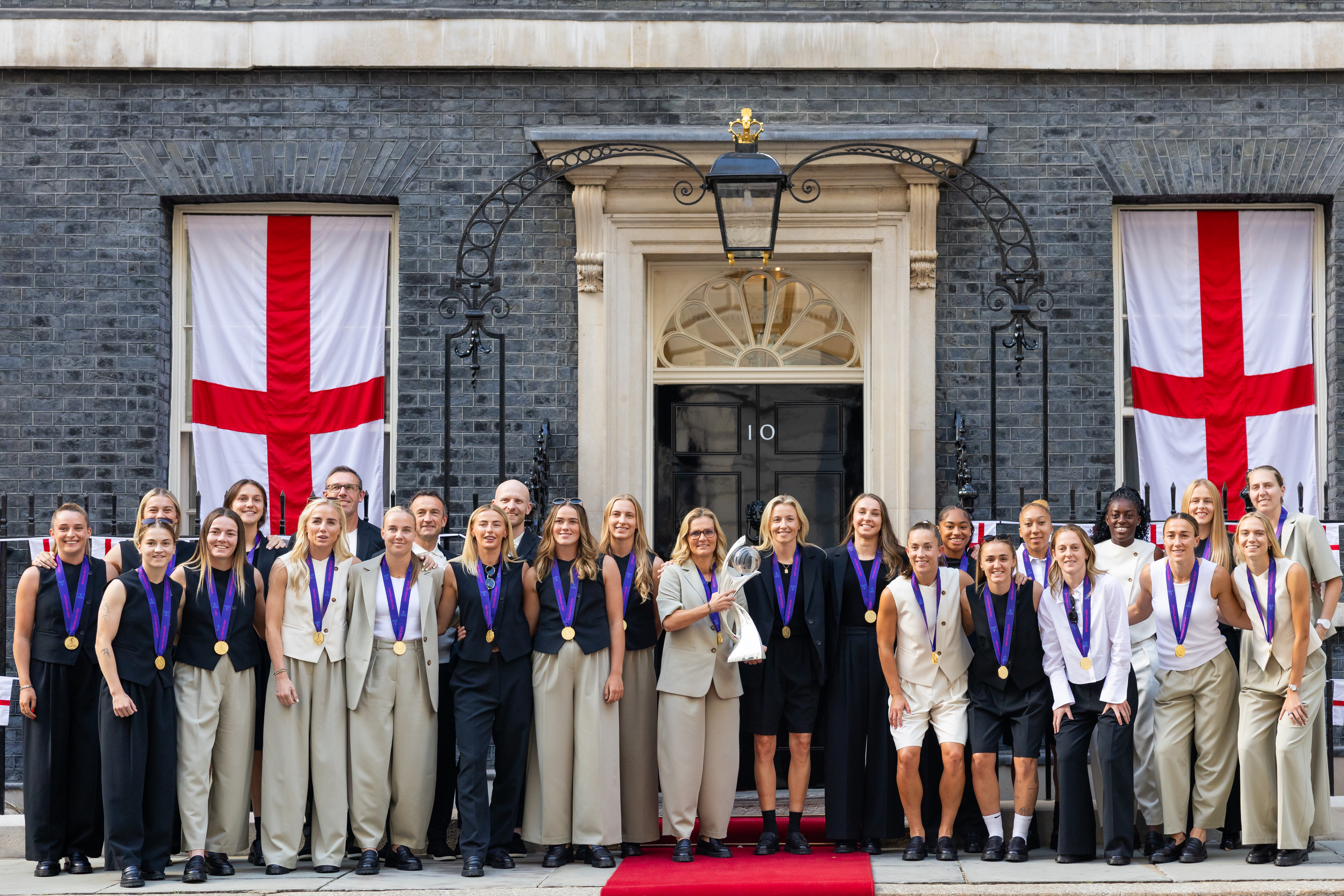
- Women's national team players at 10 Downing Street after winning Euro 2025
- Country: England
- Governing body: The Football Association
- National team: Women's national team

National competitions
- FIFA Women's World Cup; UEFA Women's Championship

Club competitions
- Divisions/leagues: Women's Super League; Women's Super League 2 FA Women's National League Northern Premier; FA Women's National League Southern Premier; Cups: FA Women's League Cup; Women's FA Community Shield (2000–2008; 2020); Women's FA Cup

International competitions
- UEFA Women's Champions League; UEFA Women's Europa Cup

Women's football has been played in England for over a century, sharing a common history with the men's game in the country in which the Laws of the Game were codified.

Women's football was originally very popular in the early 20th century, but after being banned by the men's Football Association, its popularity declined. It took until the 1990s for the number of female players and spectators to increase, culminating in England hosting the Women's European Championships in 2005.

== History ==
=== Origins ===
It is impossible to locate the precise moment at which women started playing football, just as much of the history of the men's game is uncertain. While football in the medieval era is generally believed to have been a men's game, limited evidence suggests that women were occasionally involved. Sir Philip Sidney briefly mentioned female involvement in his 16th Century poem A Dialogue Betweene Two Shepherds; meanwhile, Mary Queen of Scots was known to have been a spectator of the sport. A ball formerly in her possession is claimed by some to be the oldest football still in existence.

As football developed from a dis-organised village sport into a codified game, with more spectators than players at the end of the 19th century, women's football also developed. A team represented England in a series of matches against Scotland, in 1881 in Edinburgh, Glasgow and the north-west of England, organised by two theatre entrepreneurs and played by members of the theatre community – Lily St. Clare scored the first goal in the first match, a 3–0 win for Scotland at Hibernian Park. Their games in Glasgow (with a crowd of more than 5,000) and Manchester were marred by pitch invasions and match abandonments.

These matches are understood to have been the first international women's association football matches in history. Later in the decade, a match scheduled in 1887 between Edinburgh and Grimsby also inspired claims that Grimsby was the first women's football club side. Other women's football clubs were reported to exist in 1889, in England, Scotland and Canada.

=== Development ===
Nettie Honeyball later founded a team in late 1894 called the British Ladies' Football Club (BLFC), of which Lady Florence Dixie, daughter of the 8th Marquess of Queensberry, was president. The Lady Footballers and the British Ladies Football Club were able to tour England, playing teams across the country. However, women footballers in England were not entirely able to operate without prejudice, as evidenced in the way many elected to play under assumed names such as "Mrs Graham", to avoid reprisals for their participation. The British Ladies Football Club experiment lasted for less than two seasons.

Football clubs took advantage of women's budding interest in the sport. In 1885, seeking to curb the more boisterous behaviour of male spectators, Preston North End began offering free admission to women in the hope that their presence would restrain the men. This was successful, attracting 2,000 women to Preston's next match, and was rapidly adopted by other clubs around England. It was so successful that by the late 1890s free entry had been entirely discontinued as clubs realised how much revenue they were losing. As women's teams continued to grow in reputation, some began to stage games on grounds used by teams of their all-male, and longer-established, counterparts, often reaching respectably high attendances. Notably, a game played in 1895 at the home of Reading and featuring the British Ladies Football Club managed to draw a crowd higher than the previous highest attendance for the men's team.

=== First World War ===
Dick, Kerr Ladies in 1921

Whereas the 1915 FA Cup Final marked the final organised male football match before the men's sport was suspended, the First World War in Europe saw women's football games increase in popularity and raise the equivalent of millions of pounds for charitable causes.

The changing nature of women's work in wartime Britain helped to raise the profile of the game both as a women's sport and more generally. Although women workers were encouraged to engage with official workplace sports teams to improve health and productivity, many played football with each other in their lunch-breaks, forming unsanctioned teams such as Bella's Team, the Blyth Spartans, and the Carlisle Munitionettes. Others were invited to join the remaining men's kick-arounds outside working hours. After observing women munitions workers playing football from his office window, Alfred Frankland suggested to worker Grace Sibbert they should establish a team and play for charity. Taking the factory's name and becoming well known as Dick, Kerr's Ladies F.C., they played a total of 828 games between 1917 and 1965 and raised tens of thousands of pounds for charity in its first few years, a sum equivalent to tens of millions in the 2010s. One of these matches, played at Goodison Park, Liverpool on Boxing Day 1920, attracted a crowd of 53,000, with another 10,000–15,000 reportedly turned away because the ground was full. In north east England, the Munitionettes Cup contest in 1917–18 was another very popular event, featuring star goal-scorer Bella Reay.

Even though the end of WWI in 1918 saw many men return to work and women return to the home, the immense popularity of women's football continued, with the Dick, Kerr's Ladies playing more games in 1920 than any professional men's team in the same period. Women's international games emerged. In 1920, Alfred Frankland liaised with the Federation des Societies Feminine Sportives de France to send a French team to tour England and play the Dick, Kerr's Ladies. They competed at four venues - Preston, Stockport, Manchester and London - and played to crowds in the tens of thousands. The first ever international matches between women's clubs resulted in two wins for the English side, one for the French and one draw. The series was popular enough to result in Dick, Kerr's being invited over to France for a corresponding away tour. Going unbeaten in France, the team returned home to cheering crowds lining the streets, the equal of any accolade a men's team had received.

=== Banning, decline, and reappearance ===
The 1920s saw the re-emergence of unsubstantiated theories which contended that football threatened women's health and morality. In 1921, the Football Association banned all women's teams from playing on Association-affiliated grounds, arguing that the game is "not fitted for females", citing the high costs of player expenses, and alleging financial corruption. Dick, Kerr's player Alice Barlow recounted how women players disputed these rulings, explaining that "we could only put it down to jealousy. We were more popular than the men and our bigger gates were for charity". While a handful of teams, like Dick, Kerr's, found alternative venues, the FA's decision saw most women's teams disband and reduced spectator numbers for the few who remained.

For several decades, this decision meant that professional women's football virtually ceased to exist. Women developed their own amateur leagues, such as the English Ladies' Football Association (ELFA) which incorporated 57 teams, but these leagues drew in far smaller crowds and funding remained limited. In the context of widespread popular interest in the game following England's men's 1966 World Cup triumph, the Women's Football Association was established in 1969 which oversaw the creation of a women's England and premier league team. It would take a further two years – and an order from UEFA – to force the (men's) Football Association to remove its restrictions on the playing rights of women's teams. In the same year, the Mitre Challenge Trophy was created as the first national cup competition for women's teams in England, a competition which would eventually morph into the FA Women's Cup. Although the Women's Football Association did much to advance the game, taking an English team to the European Championship Final in 1984, insufficient funds continued to stunt growth at a grassroots level.

Around the same time, women were increasingly becoming involved around the sport in non-playing roles, such as Mary Raine who in February 1969 was sent to report on the Chelsea-Sunderland league game for radio's Sports Report, becoming the first woman to report on sport for the BBC, and Patricia Gregory, who helped found the women's FA.

=== Resurrection ===
The FA resumed direct involvement in women's football in 1993, though by this time, the WFA had already created the Women's National League, becoming the Women's Premier League in 1992, to parallel the renaming of the top level of men's competition. Most professional men's clubs chose to create, or affiliate to, a women's team and the sport gradually grew. In 2008, the women's league system was transformed following the announcement of a new top-level competition – the Women's Super League (WSL). Taking the best eight teams following sixteen applications and placing them into a no-relegation single division, the Women's Super League sought to draw greater exposure and funding into the game. The WSL faced several problems in its early stages, with the league having to be delayed a year until March 2011 due to the lingering financial instability in the aftermath of the 2008 financial crisis. Launching in 2011, the WSL proved successful enough to expand to a two-division, 20-team set-up in 2014. It was not until 2018 that the Women's Super League become fully professional with all 11 top flight teams strictly full-time.

Today, the FA directly runs the top women's competitions. The most significant national competition is the national cup, the FA Women's Cup, followed by the top national league, the FA WSL (Women's Super League). Before the formation of the WSL in 2011, the top flight was the FA Women's Premier League National Division, which later become the second-level league and has now been reorganised into the third and fourth levels of the pyramid. Originally, the Premier League champion was the only English representative allowed in Europe. When the UEFA Women's Cup was relaunched as the UEFA Women's Champions League for the 2009–10 season, England became one of eight nations with two Champions League places, a status it has retained ever since. In the first two seasons of the new Champions League, England's two places were filled by the Premier League champion and the FA Women's Cup winner. For 2011–12, the two finalists in the 2010–11 FA Women's Cup earned the Champions League places. Starting with the 2012–13 Champions League, the two berths were initially planned to go to the WSL and FA Women's Cup champions, but the FA chose instead to send the top two teams from the WSL. Women's football also has two significant secondary cup competitions. The FA WSL Cup, contested by the WSL teams, is held after the league season. The Premier League Cup, limited to the teams in the Premier League and its regional subdivisions, is held during the league season.

The WSL and Premier League have operated on different season structures – the WSL conducted a summer season contained entirely within a calendar year, whilst the Premier League continues to operate on the traditional winter season spanning two calendar years. Following an abbreviated spring season in 2017, women's football is moving to a parallel calendar to the premier league starting in the fall of 2017.

The women's football pyramid was significantly reorganised in 2014. The WSL added a second division known as WSL 2, with the original WSL becoming WSL 1. The Premier League's regional North and South Divisions became the third level of the pyramid, with the Combination Women's Football Leagues becoming the fourth level. Further changes came in 2015; the FA announced that both divisions of the WSL would expand by one team in 2016, and WSL 2 would also add a team in 2017. Significantly, the new WSL 2 entries will come via promotion from the Premier League, connecting the WSL to the rest of the pyramid for the first time.

To promote women's football, the FA allows cup finals to be held at various men's Premier League/Football League stadiums throughout the country (as opposed to men's finals which are usually held at the national stadiums). In the 2013–14 season, the FA Cup final was held at MK Dons's Stadium mk, the WSL Cup final at Wycombe Wanderers' Adams Park, and the League Cup final at Burton Albion's Pirelli Stadium.

The Women's FA Cup secured its first sponsorship deal with SSE as a sign of the huge resurrection women's football has seen since London 2012. Despite sponsorship, entering the tournament actually costs clubs more than they get in prize money. In 2015, it was reported that even if Notts County had won the tournament outright the £8,600 winnings would leave them out of pocket. The winners of the men's FA Cup in the same year received £1.8 million, with teams not reaching the first round proper getting more than the women's winners.

=== Towards the top ===
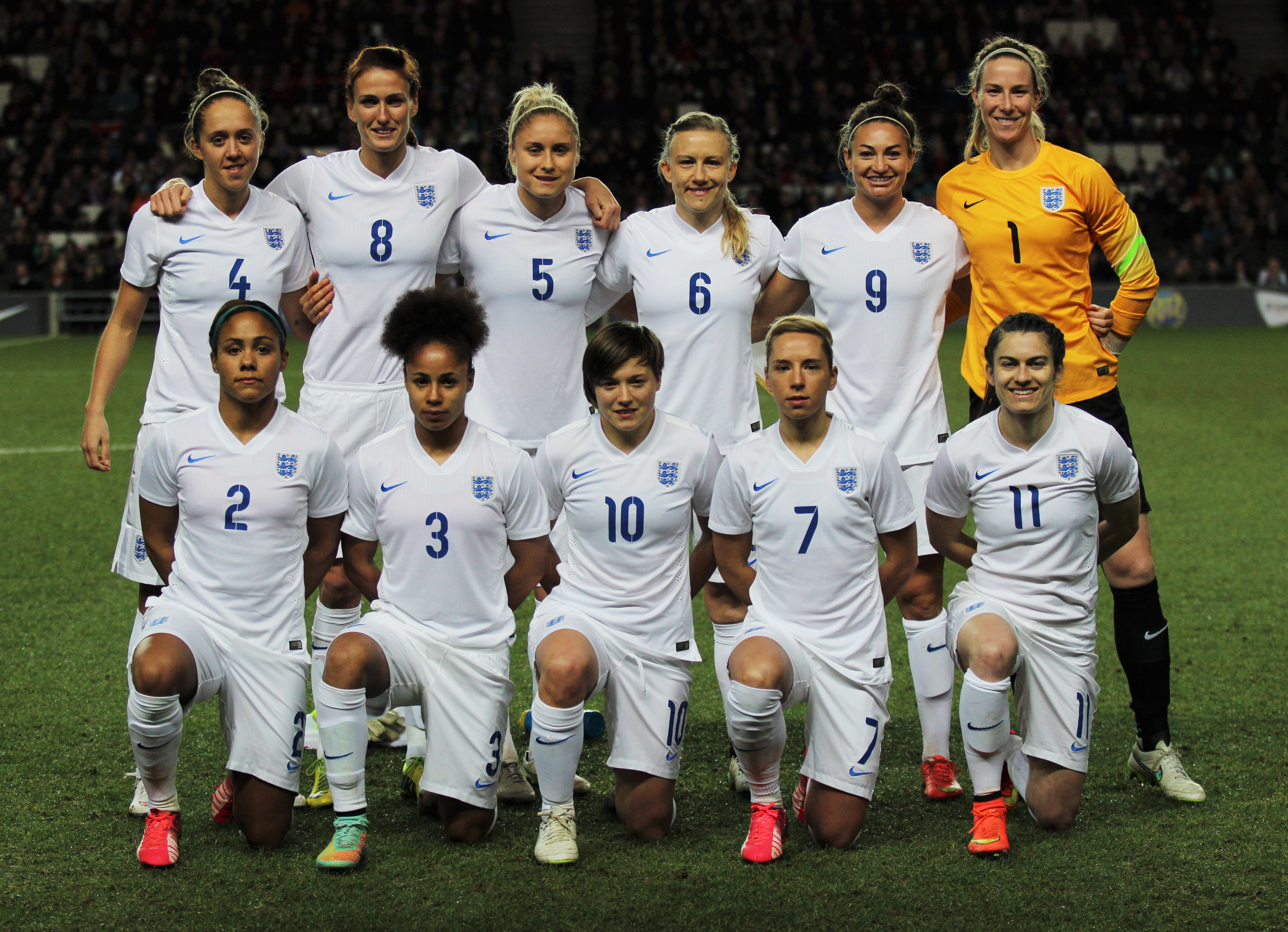
England women's team in February 2015

The women's game in England took a hit following the 2012 Olympics after England was unable to advance from the group stages at Women's EURO 2013 in Sweden, which led to Hope Powell's departure as manager and the appointment of Welshman Mark Sampson. The women's game did receive an unexpected boost when they finished third at the 2015 Women's World Cup in Canada. Along the way, they beat Norway for their first knockout stage win and then host nation Canada in front of a capacity partisan crowd in Vancouver. Following a devastating loss in the semis against defending champions, Japan, after a Laura Bassett own goal, the team rebounded to beat Germany for the first time in women's football after a 1-0 extra-time win in the third-place game. It meant that England had finished as the top European team at the World Cup and had recorded the second-best World Cup showing by any England senior team (behind Sir Alf Ramsey, Bobby Charlton and Bobby Moore's England men's squad who famously won the 1966 World Cup). During this period, women's football received a significant amount of largely positive media coverage in the UK. This was complemented by other developments, including the launch of the (then semi-professional) FA Women's Super League and, from 2015, Sport England's This Girl Can national media campaign.

The 2015 Women's FA Cup final between Chelsea Ladies and Notts County Ladies was held at Wembley Stadium for the very first time. The largest known English women's attendances to date were recorded at Wembley in that decade, in the 2012 Summer Olympic football final, USA–Japan (80,203) and the England–Germany 2019 friendly (77,768).

Euro 2017 saw the national side win their group before being knocked out in the semi-finals by the Dutch. Similarly the 2019 World Cup saw the reach the last four. In July 2022, Dutch coach Sarina Wiegman led England to a 2-1 win over Germany in the final of Euro 2022. This marked the 20th match with Wiegman at the helm, of which England had won 18 and drawn 2, including winning the Arnold Clark Cup that spring.

== League system ==
The present national league system in women's football in England was created by the Women's Football Association. The WFA's Women's National League divisions played their first season in 1991–92. In previous decades, there had been women's Regional Leagues, which continue today.

The Women's National League (1991–1994) had three divisions: the Northern Division and Southern Division at level 2, and Premier Division at level 1, with annual promotion and relegation between the levels. The Football Association took over the direct operation of the women's leagues in the 1994–95 season with the same structure, but renamed the top division the FA Women's Premier League National Division; it remained the top tier until the 2009–10 season. The Combination Women's Football Leagues, at level 3, began in 1998–99.

When the Women's Super League started in 2011 as the level 1 division, it displaced the Women's Premier League to level 2 and displaced all other divisions by one level. The WPL National Division ended after the 2012–13 season, replaced in 2014 season by WSL 2, now named the Women's Championship. The WSL operated from 2011 to 2013 on a licence system with no promotion or relegation.

The "Women's Premier League" name was implausibly used from 2014 to 2018 only for lower-league tiers at levels 3 and 4: the FA Women's Premier League Northern Division and Southern Division, and the four rebranded regional divisions of the Combination Leagues. In 2018 the "WPL" was renamed the Women's National League, restoring the name used in the leagues' early years.

At level 5 are eight regional leagues. Below the regional leagues are the county leagues.

As in the men's game, some Welsh women's football clubs compete in the English pyramid. The most successful are Gwalia United (formerly known as Cardiff City) and the now defunct Barry Town, both of which have played in the Women's Premiership.

Including the introduction of the WSL, WSL 2 and rebrands, an overview of the top five levels since 1991 is below. From 2011 to 2016, the WSL divisions changed to a summer season, while other levels stayed on a winter-based season. In 2017–18, the WSL reverted to a winter league.

| Level | 1991–92 to 1997–98 | 1998–99 to 2009–10 | 2011 to 2014 | 2014 to 2017–18 | 2018–19 to present |
|---|---|---|---|---|---|
| 1 | WPL National Division (Note: Titled the Women's National League Premier Division from 1991 to 1994.) | | WSL | WSL 1 | WSL |
| 2 | WPL Northern & Southern | | WPL National Division (Note: No promotions to WSL from 2011 to 2013; WPL National Division scrapped after 2012–13.) | WSL 2 | Women's Championship / WSL 2 |
| 3 | Regional leagues | Combination Leagues | WPL Northern & Southern | | Women's National League N & S |
| 4 | Regional leagues | Regional leagues | Combination Leagues (Note: Combination Leagues last played in 2013–14 and the four divisions became WPL Division 1 in 2014–15.) | WPL Division 1 | Women's National League Div 1 |
| 5 | Regional leagues | Regional leagues | Regional leagues | | |

=== Pyramid ===
| Level | League(s)/Division(s) | | | |
|---|---|---|---|---|
| 1 | Women's Super League (14 clubs) 1 or 2 relegated | | | |
| 2 | Women's Super League 2 (12 clubs) 1 or 2 promoted / 2 relegated | | | |
| 3 | FA Women's National League; Premier Division Northern (12 clubs) 1 or 2 promoted / 2 relegated | | FA Women's National League; Premier Division Southern (12 clubs) 1 or 2 promoted / 2 relegated | |
| 4 | FA Women's National League; Division 1 Midlands (12 clubs) 1 or 2 promoted / 2 relegated | FA Women's National League; Division 1 North (12 clubs) 1 or 2 promoted / 2 relegated | FA Women's National League; Division 1 South West (12 clubs) 1 or 2 promoted / 2 relegated | FA Women's National League; Division 1 South East (12 clubs) 1 or 2 promoted / 2 relegated |

==== Regional ====
| Level | League(s)/Division(s) | | | | | | | |
|---|---|---|---|---|---|---|---|---|
| 5 | North West Women's Regional Football League Premier Div (12 clubs) | North East Regional Women's Football League Premier Div (11 clubs) | West Midlands Regional Women's Football League Premier Div (12 clubs) | East Midlands Regional Women's Football League Premier Div (10 clubs) | Southern Region Women's Football League Premier Division (12 clubs) | South West Regional Women's Football League Premier Div (10 clubs) | Eastern Region Women's Football League Premier Division (12 clubs) | London and South East Women's Regional Football League Premier Div (12 clubs) |
| 6 | North West Women's Regional Football League Div 1 Central (10 clubs) North West Women's Regional Football League Div 1 North (10 clubs) North West Women's Regional Football League Div 1 South (10 clubs) | North East Regional Women's Football League Div 1 North (12 clubs) North East Regional Women's Football League Div 1 South (12 clubs) | West Midlands Regional Women's Football League Div 1 North (12 clubs) West Midlands Regional Women's Football League Div 1 South (12 clubs) | East Midlands Regional Women's Football League Div 1 Central (10 clubs) East Midlands Regional Women's Football League Div 1 North (10 clubs) East Midlands Regional Women's Football League Div 1 South (10 clubs) | Southern Region Women's Football League Div 1 North (10 clubs) Southern Region Women's Football League Div 1 South (12 clubs) | South West Regional Women's Football League Div 1 Central (10 clubs) South West Regional Women's Football League Div 1 North (10 clubs) South West Regional Women's Football League Div 1 West (9 clubs) | Eastern Region Women's Football League Div 1 North (12 clubs) Eastern Region Women's Football League Div 1 South (12 clubs) | London and South East Women's Regional Football League Div 1 North (12 clubs) London and South East Women's Regional Football League Div 1 South (11 clubs) |

==== County Leagues ====
| Level | League(s)/Division(s) | |
|---|---|---|
| 7 | Feeding to North West Women's Regional Football League League Div 1: Cheshire W&YFL Premier Div (10 clubs); Greater Manchester WFL Premier Div (9 clubs); Lancashire FA WCL Premier Div (11 clubs); Liverpool W&YFL Premier Div (9 clubs) Feeding to North East Women's Regional Football League League Div 1: Durham County FAL Div 1 (9 clubs); East Riding County WFL Div 1 (9 clubs); North Riding FL Women's Premier Div (9 clubs); Northumberland FL Women's Premiership (10 clubs); Sheffield & Hallamshire W&GL Div 1 (12 clubs); West Riding County WFL Premier Div (10 clubs) Feeding to West Midlands Regional Women's Football League Div 1: Birmingham County WFL Premier Div (11 clubs); Midwest Counties FFL Div 1 (9 clubs); Staffordshire G&LL Premier Div (9 clubs) Feeding to East Midlands Regional Women's Football League Div 1: Derbyshire G&LL Div 1 (10 clubs); Leicestershire W&GFL Div 1 (10 clubs); Lincolnshire W&GCFL Premier Div (8 clubs); Northamptonshire W&GFL Premier Div (11 clubs); Nottinghamshire G&LFL Div 1 (10 clubs) | Feeding to Southern Region Women's Football League Division 1: Hampshire County WFL Div 1 (10 clubs); Thames Valley Counties WFL Div 1 (10 clubs) Feeding to South West Regional Women's Football League Div 1: Cornwall WFL Premier Div (7 clubs); Devon WFL Premier Div (12 clubs); Dorset FL Women's Div.One (12 clubs); Gloucestershire County WFL Div 1 (9 clubs); Somerset County WL Div 1 (10 clubs); Wiltshire SL Premier Div (8 clubs) Feeding to Eastern Region Women's Football League Division 1: Bedfordshire and Hertfordshire WFL Premier Div (11 clubs); Cambridgeshire G&WFL Div 1 (13 clubs); Essex County WFL Premier Div (11 clubs); Norfolk W&GFL Div 1 (10 clubs); Suffolk G&WFL Premiership (10 clubs) Feeding to South East Women's Regional Football League Division 1: South East Counties WFL Premier Div (10 clubs); Sussex County WFL Premier Div (10 clubs); Greater London WFL Premier Div (10 clubs) |
| 8 | Cheshire W&YFL Championship (9 clubs); Greater Manchester WFL Div 1 (8 clubs); Lancashire FA WCL Championship (12 clubs); Liverpool W&YFL Div 1 (7 clubs) Durham County FAL Div 2 (11 clubs); East Riding County WFL Div 2 (11 clubs); North Riding FL Women's Div 1 (8 clubs); Northumberland FL Women's Div 1 (11 clubs); Sheffield & Hallamshire W&GL Div 2 (12 clubs); West Riding County WFL Div 1 (10 clubs) Birmingham County WFL Div 1 (11 clubs); Midwest Counties FFL Div 2 (11 clubs); Staffordshire G&LL Div 1 (10 clubs) Derbyshire G&LL Div 2 (10 clubs); Leicestershire W&GFL Div 2 (9 clubs); Lincolnshire W&GCFL Championship (9 clubs); Northamptonshire W&GFL Div 1 (14 clubs); Nottinghamshire G&LFL Div 2 (11 clubs) | Hampshire County WFL Div 2 (9 clubs); Thames Valley Counties WFL Div 2 North (12 clubs); Thames Valley Counties WFL Div 2 South (11 clubs) Cornwall WFL Div 1 (8 clubs); Devon WFL North & East Div (10 clubs); Devon WFL South & West Div (12 clubs); Dorset FL Women's Div.Two (11 clubs); Gloucestershire County WFL Div 2 (10 clubs); Somerset County WL Div 2 (9 clubs) Wiltshire SL Div 1 (8 clubs) Bedfordshire and Hertfordshire WFL Div 1 (11 clubs); Cambridgeshire G&WFL Div 2 (12 clubs); Essex County WFL Div 1 (11 clubs); Norfolk W&GFL Div 2 (11 clubs); Suffolk G&WFL Championship (9 clubs) South East Counties WFL Kent Div 1 East (10 clubs); South East Counties WFL Kent Div 1 West (9 clubs); South East Counties WFL Surrey Premier Div (11 clubs); Sussex County WFL Championship (9 clubs); Greater London WFL Div 1 North (8 clubs); Greater London WFL Div 1 South (9 clubs) |
| 9 | Greater Manchester WFL Div 2 (9 clubs); Lancashire FA WCL Division 1 North (8 clubs); Lancashire FA WCL Division 1 North/West (11 clubs); Lancashire FA WCL Division 1 South/East (10 clubs); Liverpool W&YFL Div 2 (9 clubs) Durham County FAL Div 3 (11 clubs); Sheffield & Hallamshire W&GL Div 3 (12 clubs); West Riding WFL Div 2 (10 clubs) Birmingham County WFL Div 2 (10 clubs); Derbyshire G&LL Div 3 (14 clubs); Leicestershire W&GFL Div 3 (7 clubs); Nottinghamshire G&LFL Div 3 (11 clubs) | Hampshire County WFL Div 3 (10 clubs); Thames Valley Counties WFL Div 3 North (12 clubs); Thames Valley Counties WFL Div 3 South (11 clubs); Thames Valley Counties WFL Div 3 West (10 clubs) Cornwall WFL Div 2 (9 clubs); Gloucestershire County WFL Div 3 (11 clubs); Somerset County WL Div 3 North (8 clubs); Somerset County WL Div 3 South (8 clubs); Wiltshire SL Div 2 (8 clubs) Bedfordshire and Hertfordshire WFL Div 2 (11 clubs); Cambridgeshire G&WFL Div 3 North (10 clubs); Cambridgeshire G&WFL Div 3 South (10 clubs); Essex County WFL Div 2 (11 clubs); Norfolk W&GFL Div 3 (12 clubs) South East Counties WFL Kent Div 2 East (9 clubs); South East Counties WFL Kent Div 2 West (10 clubs); South East Counties WFL Surrey Div 1 (9 clubs); Sussex County WFL Div 1 (7 clubs); Greater London WFL Div 2 North (8 clubs); Greater London WFL Div 2 South (9 clubs) |
| 10 | Greater Manchester WFL Div 3 (10 clubs) Durham County FAL Development Div (9 clubs); Sheffield & Hallamshire W&GL Div 4 (10 clubs); West Riding WFL Div 3 (9 clubs) | Birmingham County WFL Div 3 (11 clubs); Hampshire County WFL Div 4 (10 clubs) Gloucestershire County WFL Div 4 (11 clubs) Bedfordshire and Hertfordshire WFL Div 3 (11 clubs); Essex County WFL Div 3 (11 clubs) South East Counties WFL Kent Div 3 Central (7 clubs); South East Counties WFL Kent Div 3 East (8 clubs); South East Counties WFL Kent Div 3 West (9 clubs) |
| 11 | Sheffield & Hallamshire W&GL Div 5 (11 clubs); West Riding WFL Div 4 (9 clubs) | Hampshire County WFL Div 5 (7 clubs) Essex County WFL Div 4 (11 clubs) |
| 12 | West Riding WFL Div 5 (9 clubs) | Hampshire County WFL Div 6 (8 clubs) |
| 13 | West Riding WFL Div 6 (12 clubs) | Hampshire County WFL Div 7 (8 clubs) |

=== Cup eligibility ===
- FA Women's Cup: Levels 1–5
- FA Women's League Cup: Levels 1–2
- FA Women's National League Cup: Levels 3–4
- FA Women's National League Plate: Level 4

=== Match attendance ===
Latest available average home attendances for Women’s Super League (WSL) clubs during the 2024–25 season. Arsenal was the only women's football club in the world with an average home league attendance of at least 20,000 in the 2024-25 or 2025 season.

| Club | Average attendance | Primary Ground / Occasional Venue | Ground Capacity |
|---|---|---|---|
| Arsenal | 28,808 | Emirates Stadium / Meadow Park | 60,704 / 4,500 |
| Chelsea | 9,426 | Stamford Bridge / Kingsmeadow | 40,341 / 4,850 |
| Manchester United | 7,390 | Leigh Sports Village / Old Trafford (select) | 12,000 / 74,310 |
| Liverpool | 6,753 | Prenton Park / Anfield (select) | 16,587 / 61,276 |
| Manchester City | 6,536 | Joie Stadium (Academy Stadium) | 7,000 |
| Tottenham Hotspur | 5,332 | Brisbane Road / Tottenham Hotspur Stadium (select) | 9,271 / 62,850 |
| Brighton & Hove Albion | 3,674 | Broadfield Stadium | 6,134 |
| Aston Villa | 3,420 | Bescot Stadium / Villa Park (select) | 11,300 / 42,657 |
| Leicester City | 2,881 | King Power Stadium / Pirelli Stadium (historic) | 32,261 |
| Everton | 1,956 | Walton Hall Park / Goodison Park (select) | 2,200 / 39,414 |
| Crystal Palace | 1,783 | Selhurst Park / Hayes Lane | 25,486 / 5,000 |
| West Ham United | 1,614 | Chigwell Construction Stadium / London Stadium (rare) | 6,500 / 62,500 |

- Many clubs rotate between a primary women's stadium (smaller, often training-ground-adjacent) and a larger venue for key fixtures or derbies
- Capacities listed are maximum potential, not limited to seated-only or WSL ticketing restrictions
- Crystal Palace, newly promoted, may move toward regular use of Selhurst Park pending match-by-match demand
- The 2024–25 Women’s Championship did not publish average attendance but cumulative attendance reached 187 859 after 21 matches, breaking prior records.
- Newcastle United set both club and league record attendances for the Championship.(record match: 38,502) Highest ever Women’s Championship crowd

== See also ==
- Bans of women's association football
- England women's national football team
- Football in England
- List of women's association football clubs in England
- Women's Super League
