= Honeyball =

Honeyball is a surname. Notable people with the surname include:

- Mary Honeyball (born 1952), British politician
- Nettie Honeyball, English footballer
