= Emma Clarke (footballer) =

British footballer

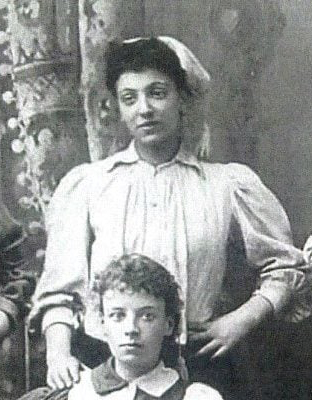
- Emma Clarke in 1895

Personal information
- Date of birth: 1876
- Place of birth: Bootle, England
- Date of death: unknown
- Positions: Goalkeeper; right winger

Senior career*
Years	Team	Apps	(Gls)
1895	British Ladies' Football Club		
1896	Mrs Graham's XI		
- * Club domestic league appearances and goals

Emma Clarke (1876 - unknown) was a British footballer, considered to be the first known black women's footballer in Britain.

== Early life ==
Born in Bootle, Lancashire in England, to parents William and Wilhelmina Clarke, Emma, along with her sister, (Note: There are contradictory records of Emma's sister's name, which might have been Jane or Florence. There may have also been a third sister, Mary.) who was also one of the earliest known black women footballers in Britain, grew up in Bootle. She worked as a confectioner's apprentice from the age of 15, and received her formative sporting education playing the game in her neighbourhood streets, in an area very close to where the suffragist Helen Graham Matthews lived. Matthews later gave her name to a team for which Clarke played at the beginning of the twentieth century, Mrs Graham's XI.

== Football career ==
Clarke normally played as an outfield player, described by the South Wales Daily News as "the fleet footed dark girl on the right wing". She also played as goalkeeper.

Her club football career began in 1895, when she made her debut for the British Ladies' Football Club, an early all-women's football club patronised by Lady Florence Dixie. A number of individuals named "Clarke" make it difficult to provide precise details as to Clarke's career with the British Ladies, however, photographic evidence shows her lined up in the official team photo for the "South" team of the British Ladies in their inaugural exhibition match, (Note: For their exhibition games, the British Ladies would often field two teams from the club, named either "North" and "South" or "Red" and "Blue") a game watched by more than 10,000 (Note: Variously reported in newspapers at the time as up to 11,000) people at Alexandra Park, Crouch End, London, a game that Clarke's "South" team lost 7–1.

The first record of women's teams in an organised football match had occurred on 7 May 1881, at Edinburgh's Hibernian Park in a match, billed as a Scotland v England international (though it was not a full international in the modern sense).

The following year (1896), Clarke made her debut for Mrs Graham's XI, selected as part of the team which toured Scotland that year. Interest in the tour was substantial and their matches regularly attracted crowds numbering in the thousands. As well as receiving payment for expenses, it is estimated that Clarke would have been paid approximately a shilling a week while on the tour.

In 1897, she made an appearance for a team described as "The New Woman and Ten of Her Lady Friends" against "Eleven Gentlemen". The ladies team were victorious 3–1, although the report at the time made it clear the feelings about the women's game at the time, describing the game as a grotesque, although conceding that "in the second half the ladies distinguished themselves". It is also thought that her sister played in this match.

Clarke's career as a footballer continued until at least 1903.

== Legacy ==
For decades, Clarke and her contribution to the game was mistaken for goalkeeper Carrie Boustead, once described by a journalist as "a coloured lady of Dutch build", who was later confirmed to be white. Clarke was rediscovered by artist Stuart Gibbs only when a photo of the team that toured Scotland was discovered. He then identified that the player in question was Clarke, not Boustead.

Theatre company, Futures Theatre, wrote a play called Offside, which celebrates the contribution women have made to the game and which dramatises the story of Clarke.

In 2019, a blue heritage plaque commemorating Clarke was unveiled at Campsbourne School, Hornsey, which is the site of her team, the former Crouch End FC.

== See also ==
- Women's association football
- Dick, Kerr's Ladies F.C.
