= 2018–19 FA Women's National League Plate =

WNL Plate

Tournament details
- Country: England
- Teams: 35

Tournament statistics
- Matches played: 33
- Goals scored: 155 (4.7 per match)
- All statistics correct as of 20:11, 28 April 2019 (UTC).

The 2018–19 FA Women's National League Plate is the fifth running of the competition, which began in 2014. It is the secondary League Cup competition run by the FA Women's National League (FA WNL), and is run in parallel with the league's primary League Cup competition, the National League Cup.

The teams that take part in the WNL plate are decided after the determining round of the WNL Cup. The winners of determining round matches continue in the WNL Cup, while the losers move into the WNL Plate.

All 72 National League clubs were included in the determining round draw. St Nicholas withdrew from the competition before playing a match, meaning 36 teams progressed in the Cup and 35 were entered in the Plate.

West Ham United were the reigning champions, having defeated Luton Town 5–0 in the 2017–18 final, but did not defend their title after obtaining a licence to the FA Women's Super League.

== Results ==
All results listed are published by The Football Association. Games are listed by round in chronological order, and then in alphabetical order of the home team where matches were played simultaneously.

The division each team play in is indicated in brackets after their name: (S)=Southern Division; (N)=Northern Division; (SW1)=South West Division One; (SE1)=South East Division One; (M1)=Midlands Division One; (N1)=Northern Division One.

=== First round ===
Due to there being 35 teams in the competition, three first round matches are played to eliminate three teams allowing a full single-elimination knockout tournament to take place.

30 September 2018	Poole Town (SW1)	0–9	Portsmouth (S)	Poole
14:00 BST (UTC+01:00)		Report	James 8'; Perkins 16', 20', 58'; Currie 26'; Panting 48', 71', 79'; Geer 54'	Stadium: County Ground

7 October 2018	Barnsley (N1)	5–1	Burton Albion (M1)	Barnsley
14:00 BST (UTC+01:00)	Woodruff 7'; Crump 22'; Ward 62'; Bell 71'; Hornsey 83'	Report	Jarvis 18'	Stadium: Barnsley FC Academy; Attendance: 50

14 October 2018	Keynsham Town (SW1)	7–1	Southampton Saints (SW1)	Keynsham
14:00 BST (UTC+01:00)	Bartlett 10', 35', 44', 55'; Lorton 60'; Munro 75'; Curson 80'	Report	Buckingham 15'	Stadium: The AJN Stadium

=== Second round ===
14 October 2018	Actonians (SE1)	1–2	Chesham United (SW1)	Northolt
14:00 BST (UTC+01:00)	Williams 67'	Report	Delves 17'; Fraser 90+3'	Stadium: Rectory Park

14 October 2018	Doncaster Rovers Belles (N)	2–3 (a.e.t.)	Barnsley (N1)	Doncaster
14:00 BST (UTC+01:00)	Whittle	Report	Woodruff 15'; Bell 90'; Crump 113'	Stadium: Oxford Street

14 October 2018	Gillingham (S)	5–4	Luton Town (SE1)	Charlton
14:00 BST (UTC+01:00)	Booker; Bussey; Giordani; Grant; Sherwood	Report	Carter; McKay; Ryan	Stadium: Meridian Sports and Social Club

14 October 2018	Ipswich Town (SE1)	4–2	C & K Basildon (S)	Felixstowe
14:00 BST (UTC+01:00)	Cossey; Thomas; Wayne	Report	Murray; Abela	Stadium: The Goldstar Ground

14 October 2018	Liverpool Feds (N1)	2–0	Crewe Alexandra (N1)	Liverpool
14:00 BST (UTC+01:00)	Rogers 72'; Devereaux 80'	Report		Stadium: Jeffrey Humble Hub; Attendance: 70

14 October 2018	Long Eaton United (M1)	0–1 (a.e.t.)	Chester Le Street (N1)	Long Eaton
14:00 BST (UTC+01:00)		Report	Havery 95'	Stadium: Grange Park

14 October 2018	Maidenhead United (SW1)	1–1 (a.e.t.) (4–2 p)	Denham United (SE1)	Maidenhead
14:00 BST (UTC+01:00)	McKeever	Report	Keightley 88'	Stadium: York Road Stadium

14 October 2018	Morecambe (N1)	4–3 (a.e.t.)	Sheffield (N)	Lancaster
14:00 BST (UTC+01:00)	Swarbrick 16', 65', 111'; Broad 81'	Report	Butcher 45'; White 52'; Tinsley 69'	Stadium: Lancaster and Morecambe College

14 October 2018	Steel City Wanderers (M1)	4–6	Sporting Khalsa (M1)	Sheffield
14:00 BST (UTC+01:00)	Hallam; Ridley	Report	Handy; Kydd; Kavanagh; Quigley; Woolley; Walker	Stadium: St George's Park Thorncliffe

14 October 2018	Swindon Town (SW1)	1–2	Bedworth United (M1)	Fairford
14:00 BST (UTC+01:00)	Colford 31'	Report	Farnsworth; Walsh	Stadium: Cinder Lane

14 October 2018	West Bromwich Albion (M1)	5–0	Nettleham (M1)	Sutton Coldfield
14:00 BST (UTC+01:00)	Bevan; Dale; Davies; Murray	Report		Stadium: Trevor Brown Memorial Ground

21 October 2018	Brislington (SW1)	0–3	Milton Keynes Dons (S)	Brislington
14:00 BST (UTC+01:00)		Report	Littlechild 5'; Cudone 12'; Hughes 35'	Stadium: Brislington Stadium

21 October 2018	Keynsham Town (SW1)	2–1	Portsmouth (S)	Keynsham
14:00 BST (UTC+01:00)	Bartlett 39'; Curson 90+2'	Report	James 11'	Stadium: The AJN Stadium; Attendance: 90

21 October 2018	Solihull (M1)	0–6	Middlesbrough (N)	Birmingham
15:00 BST (UTC+01:00)		Report	Birtwhistle 8'; Scarr 16', 53'; Dodds 36', 76'; Dale 84'	Stadium: West Midland Sports & Social Club; Attendance: 30

28 October 2018	The New Saints (M1)	5–0	Bradford City (N)	Llanymynech
14:00 GMT (UTC+00:00)	Ridge 6', 26', 32'; Morris 47', 75'	Report		Stadium: Foxen Manor; Attendance: 43

Walkover	Norwich City (SE1)	A–W	Stevenage (SE1)

=== Third round ===
9 December 2018	Gillingham (S)	5–0	Chesham United (SW1)	Gillingham
14:00 GMT (UTC+00:00)	Booker; Grant	Report		Stadium: Priestfield Stadium

9 December 2018	Ipswich Town (SE1)	1–2 (a.e.t.)	Stevenage (SE1)	Felixstowe
14:00 GMT (UTC+00:00)	Thomas	Report	Deacon; Searle	Stadium: The Goldstar Ground

9 December 2018	Keynsham Town (SW1)	7–1	Maidenhead United (SW1)	Keynsham
14:00 GMT (UTC+00:00)	Lorton 21', 85'; Bartlett 24'; Vega 33'; Rendall 57'; Jones 80'; Williams 90'	Report	Barnes 20'	Stadium: The AJN Stadium

9 December 2018	Liverpool Feds (N1)	1–0	Chester Le Street (N1)	Liverpool
14:00 GMT (UTC+00:00)	Devereaux 3'	Report		Stadium: South Liverpool Football Hub; Attendance: 20

9 December 2018	Milton Keynes Dons (S)	2–1 (a.e.t.)	Bedworth United (M1)	Milton Keynes
14:00 GMT (UTC+00:00)	Cudone	Report	Lundie 68'	Stadium: Stadium MK; Attendance: 120

9 December 2018	Morecambe (N1)	2–3 (a.e.t.)	Middlesbrough (N)	Lancaster
14:00 GMT (UTC+00:00)	Brown; Hutton	Report	Foster 17'; Dodds 75'; Dale 102'	Stadium: Lancaster and Morecambe College

9 December 2018	The New Saints (M1)	0–9	Barnsley (N1)	Oswestry
14:00 GMT (UTC+00:00)		Report	Woodhouse 1', 60', 71'; Greene 10'; Ward 16'; Hornsey 41'; Woodruff 69', 75'; Bell 80'	Stadium: Park Hall Stadium

6 January 2019	Sporting Khalsa (M1)	1–2	West Bromwich Albion (M1)	Willenhall
14:00 GMT (UTC+00:00)	Kavanagh 25'	Report	Murray; Price	Stadium: The Aspray Arena; Attendance: 60

=== Quarter-finals ===
10 February 2018	Barnsley (N1)	0–1	West Bromwich Albion (M1)	Barnsley
14:00 GMT (UTC+00:00)		Report	George	Stadium: Barnsley FC Academy

10 February 2018	Liverpool Feds (N1)	2–0	Middlesbrough (N)	Liverpool
14:00 GMT (UTC+00:00)	Mortimer 30'; Lee 35'	Report		Stadium: South Liverpool Football Hub; Attendance: 50

10 February 2018	Stevenage (SE1)	0–4	Gillingham (S)	Hertford
14:00 GMT (UTC+00:00)		Report	Grant; Seely; Waud	Stadium: Hertingfordbury Park

24 February 2018	Milton Keynes Dons (S)	2–2 (a.e.t.) (6–5 p)	Keynsham Town (SW1)	Milton Keynes
14:00 GMT (UTC+00:00)	Cudone; Gooderham	Report	Williams 26'; Vega 75'	Stadium: Stadium MK

=== Semi-finals ===
3 March 2018
14:00 GMT (UTC+00:00)

Gillingham (S)	W–O (Note: Gillingham won the game 1–0 before being disqualified.)	West Bromwich Albion (M1)
Fowler	Report

The CJ Doors Stadium, Chatham
3 March 2018
14:00 GMT (UTC+00:00)

Milton Keynes Dons (S)	W–O (Note: Milton Keynes Dons won the game 4–3 after extra time before being disqualified.)	Liverpool Feds (N1)
Doyle 25'; Newman 38'; Farrow 99', 111'	Report	Devereaux; Mortimer

Stadium MK, Milton Keynes

=== Final ===
14 April 2019
15:00 BST (UTC+01:00)

Liverpool Feds (N1)	1–5	West Bromwich Albion (M1)
Farley 18'	Report	Davies; Davies; Elsmore; George; Murray

Butlin Road, Rugby
