= Bella Reay =

English footballer (1900–1979)

Personal information
- Date of birth: 23 August 1900
- Place of birth: Cowpen, Northumberland
- Date of death: 1979 (aged 78–79)

Senior career*
Years	Team	Apps	(Gls)
1917–1919	Blyth Spartans	30	(133)

International career
1918	North of England	1	(0)
- * Club domestic league appearances and goals

Issabella (Bella) Reay (1900–1979) was an English association football player between 1917 and 1919. She played at centre forward for Blyth Spartans and England, scoring 133 goals in one season in her team's unbeaten run of 30 matches to win the Munitionettes' Cup and was the best-known player. This was at a time when women's participation in public competitive football was controversial.

== Personal life ==
She was the daughter of a coal miner, born in Cowpen, Northumberland in 1900. She worked in a munitions factory and played football for Blyth Spartans during the First World War. After the war, she married, becoming Mrs Henstock and had a daughter. She continued to work into her 60s on a farm. She died in 1979.

== Playing career ==
During the First World War, competitive league football in Britain was suspended. However, the game was still popular with matches held between amateur teams to raise morale, entertain and collect charitable funds. A football team, called variously Blyth United Munitions Ladies, Blyth Spartans Ladies and Blyth Spartans Munitionettes, was formed in August 1917 by women working as dockers and in munitions factories at the South Docks in Blyth, Northumberland, England. It rapidly became the best women's football team in North East England, substantially aided by Reay's skill. The team played at Croft Park, the home of Blyth Spartans A.F.C. Large crowds came to the matches and the money taken at the gate was donated to charity. From September 1917 to May 1918 the team competed in the Munitionettes' Cup (officially called the Alfred Wood Munition Girls Challenge Cup). Blyth Spartans won 26 and drew four of the matches on their way to winning the Munitionettes' Cup. Reay scored 133 goals during the 30-match series, including six in one match and four in the final at Ayresome Park, Middlesbrough.

In late December 1917, Reay opted to play for her team against Newcastle Ladies, rather than a trial match at Wallsend for a place in the England team. She had been selected for the Possibles team, rather than the Probables. However, at the end of the 1918 season she had the chance to play as an international, first on 6 July 1918 against Tyneside Internationals for a team called North of England, and finally on 20 July at St James' Park in Newcastle playing centre forward against a Scottish International team. Unusually, she did not score a goal in the latter game that England won 3–2.

The team was disbanded during the 1918–19 season, and in 1921 the Football Association banned women's football in England from using their grounds. However, several women's football matches were organised in 1921 to raise funds for miners and their families during a three-month coal dispute. Reay played for several teams, including Cowpen, Cambois, and Blyth and was still prolific in scoring goals. On 25 May 1921, Cowpen won a match with Bebside 4–0 with Reay scoring all the goals.

== Legacy ==
A commemorative Blue plaque was installed on the stand at Croft Park, the home of the current Blyth Spartans AFC in November 2018.

Reay's story appears in the film Asunder, a film by Esther Johnson (film producer) funded by NOW WW1 centenary arts commissions.
