= Marrie Wieczorek =

English footballer

Personal information
- Place of birth: Middlesbrough, England
- Position: Midfielder

Senior career*
Years	Team	Apps	(Gls)
1976–1996	Middlesbrough		

International career
1980	England	3	(0)

Managerial career
- 1996–2012: Middlesbrough
- * Club domestic league appearances and goals

Marrie Wieczorek is an English former football manager and player. She spent her entire career with Middlesbrough, some 20 years as a player, before becoming manager in 1996.

Wieczorek earned 3 caps for England, and received the legacy number 47. She is the first female Middlesbrough player to play for England.

== Playing career ==
Wieczorek was a founding member of Cleveland Spartans, who played in the Nottinghamshire Ladies League. She was part of the team who reached the 1982 WFA Cup Final, losing 2–0 to Lowestoft. The following season the club reached the quarter-finals, but were beaten 4–2 by Doncaster Belles. Wieczorek spent the last few seasons of her playing career as a player-manager.

== International career ==
Wieczorek made her England debut on 1 May 1980, in a 2–1 loss to Belgium. She made two more appearances for England, first in a 6–1 win against Wales on 1 June 1980, and a 1–1 draw against Sweden on 17 September 1980.

== Managerial career ==
In 1996 Wieczorek was appointed manager of Middlesbrough Women. Under her guidance Middlesbrough won the 2001–02 Northern Combination. The club spent four seasons in the FA Women's Premier League Northern Division, before relegation at the end of the 2005–06 season. In September 2010, the team travelled to North Korea and played two friendly matches against April 25, losing 6–2, and Kalmaegi, losing 5–0. Wieczorek remained in charge of Middlesbrough until 2012.

== Personal life ==
Wieczorek is of Polish descent, and attended Sacred Heart Primary School, and later St Mary's Convent R.C. Grammar School.

== Honours ==
=== Manager ===
Middlesbrough Women

- Northern Combination Women's Football League: 2001–02
