= Combination Women's Football Leagues =

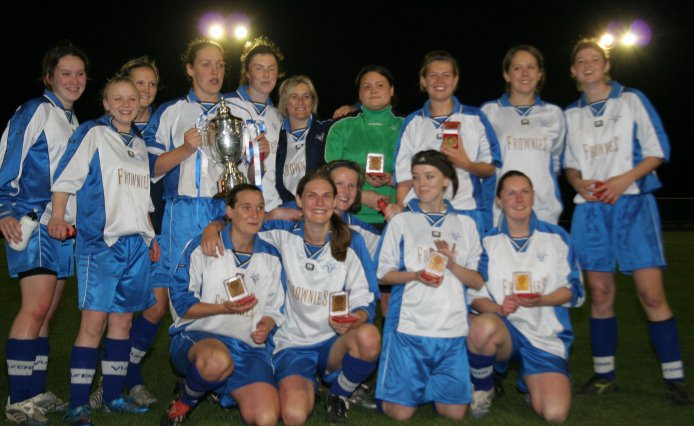
Leeds City Vixens, shown in 2007, became the Northern Combination League champions in 2008–09

The Combination Women's Football Leagues were a group of women's football leagues in England from 1998 until 2014.

The Combination Leagues sat at level 3 of women's football in England from 1998–99 until 2009–10.

The leagues consisted of four regional divisions:

- Midland Combination Women's Football League
- Northern Combination Women's Football League
- South East Combination Women's Football League
- South West Combination Women's Football League

The Combination Leagues were classified below the two levels of the FA Women's Premier League (founded in 1991). Promotion-winning teams entered league level 2, into either the FA Women's Premier League Northern Division or the Southern Division.

The four Combination Leagues were an expansion of the women's football pyramid, being placed above the ten Regional Leagues established in 1990 which exist today in similar form.

After the creation of the FA WSL in 2011, the other divisions were placed one level lower, and so the Combination Leagues sat at level 4 from the season 2010–11 until 2013–14.

The Combination Leagues were abolished and renamed from the 2014–15 season onwards. Keeping the same format and staying at league level 4, the four divisions were incorporated into the FA Women's Premier League as the WPL Division One regions. From 2018 to 2019, the WPL was renamed; these four divisions are currently named the Women's National League Division One.
