= Highgate Hill =

Highgate Hill may refer to:

- Highgate Hill, a street and locality in Highgate, London, United Kingdom
- Highgate Hill, Queensland, a suburb of Brisbane, Australia
- Highgate Hill, earlier name of Highgate, Western Australia, a Perth suburb
