= Helen Matthews =

Scottish suffragette and footballer

Helen Matthew
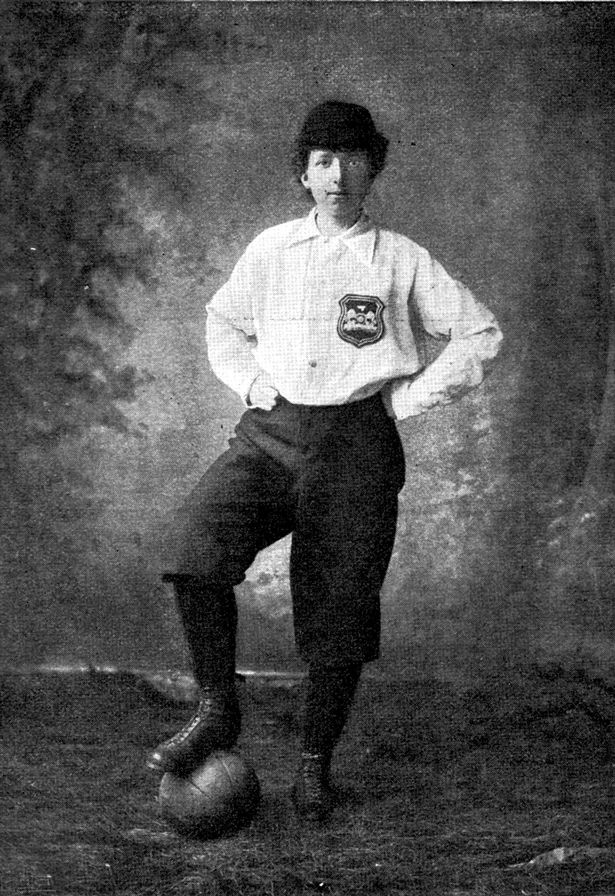
- Helen Matthew in 1895
- Born: 1871, London (according to birth records), or 1872–73, Montrose, Angus, Scotland (according to interview)
- Died: Unknown
- Occupation: Footballer
- Years active: c. 1890–c. 1896

Helen Matthews, real name probably Helen Matthew (c. 1872 – c. 1950s), also known by her pseudonym Mrs Graham, was a Scottish footballer, artist, and suffragette. Matthew (or Graham) is known as a leading player and team captain from the 1890s, and for recruiting the first black woman footballer, Emma Clarke.

== Biography ==
Birth records suggest she was born Helen Jane Matthew in London in 1871. Her parents were William and Eliza Matthew, and her sister was Florence Matthew. Helen later said she was born in Montrose. She probably lived there and in Littleham, Devon, but moved to Lancashire around 1880. The Matthew family lived on Carisbrooke Road in Walton, Liverpool (near to where Emma Clarke grew up in Bootle). Matthew stated in 1896 she had been in Lancashire for twenty years.

Helen Matthew's first football match appearance was probably in 1890, in Alec Payne's football and entertainment tour of English and Welsh towns.

Inaccurate modern reports (including in the New York Times) claimed she founded the first women's teams in 1881, but this is not backed by any primary source.

Helen Matthew was a newspaper artist from 1891 to 1895, publishing articles with her sister Florence as "The Lothian Lasses". They were fans of the first men's Football League champions Preston North End and of Nick Ross; they wrote, "N.E. are our one favourite team and can do no wrong except get beaten, when we long to visit them with a whip". Their articles, with Helen's illustrations, were published in the Cricket & Football Field, Liverpool Echo, Lancashire Evening Post and the Cardiff Evening News.

Matthew went to London in 1895, possibly playing in Birmingham beforehand for the short-lived Midland Ladies Football Club in March 1895.

A new club was founded by suffragette Nettie Honeyball and manager Alfred Hewitt Smith, named the British Ladies' Football Club or the Lady Footballers, who arranged tours usually as North v South or Reds v Blues matches; Matthew, as "Mrs Graham", played as a goalkeeper and sometime team captain. From late 1895 until June 1896, Matthew led her own teams, also initially named Reds v Blues, but later the Original Lady Footballers or Mrs Graham's XI, to play tour games, including against Scottish men's teams. In the first match of the tour against Irvine, Matthew sustained a black eye, but continued playing. Mrs Graham's XI had Emma Clarke, the first black woman player, touring Scotland that year too; she continued to play with her sister up to 1903, but Clarke's true identity was not confirmed until 2017.

In an 1896 interview, "Mrs Graham" claimed that all of her team were, like her, from Lancashire. In 1900, Matthew was involved in a court forgery case against the manager of a sports shop, where her name was recorded as "Helen Graham Matthews"; other names she used were "Mrs Helen Graham" (although still single) in 1895, and "H.M.G" to sign her artwork.

In the 1900s, Matthew became a racehorse owner. According to the historian Stuart Gibbs, "Horse racing was a common target for the radical wing of the suffrage movement so it seems unlikely that Helen with her links to the racetrack would have been a suffragette". She married in 1915. Matthew was recorded as still being a Preston supporter in her 70s in Newton Abbot, and following the team's 1954 FA Cup Final from a hospital bed.

== Recognition ==
Matthew (under the name Helen Graham) was recognised in the inaugural Scottish Women in Sport Hall of Fame, in 2018.

== See also ==
- Emma Clarke
- Women's association football
- Dick, Kerr's Ladies F.C.
