= Charlotte Carter =

American writer

Charlotte Carter is an American novelist, short story writer and poet. She is best known for her crime series featuring Nanette Hayes, a jazz musician who lives in New York.

== Early life ==
Carter grew up in Bronzeville, Chicago in a multigenerational household shared with her parents, grandparents and uncle. She read widely, and attended community college as a teenager, developing an interest in noir film, poetry and jazz.

== Writing career ==
=== Early work ===
Carter moved to New York when she was 24, where she lived in the East Village opposite St. Mark's Church, home of the Poetry Project. She identifies this as a "turning point" in her life; she took part in a writing workshop run by the project, and subsequently became involved in the wider experimental writing scene. During this time her work was published in anthologies, and in 1975 her poetry collection Sheltered Life was published by Angel Hair Press.

Carter worked for a time as assistant to writer Franklin B. King, who wrote crime novels under his own name, as well as ghostwriting extensively, including pornographic novels. She also continued to write her own stories and prose poems, some of which would be collected in 1991 in her book Personal Effects.

=== The Nanette Hayes series ===
Carter and King remained close, and in the 1990s, while King was writing a series of cat-themed cosy mysteries under the name Lydia Adamson, he and Carter walked past a woman saxophonist who was busking on 6th Avenue. King suggested that Carter use the busker as inspiration for a project of her own. This project would become Carter's first published novel.

The novel, Rhode Island Red, was published in the UK in 1997 by Serpent's Tail. It featured Nanette Hayes, a saxophone-playing busker who finds herself caught up in a mystery when another busker is killed in her apartment. It received positive reviews from Donna Leon in the Sunday Times, as well as from Good Housekeeping, The Guardian and the Sunday Telegraph.

Further novels in the series, Coq Au Vin and Drumsticks, were published by Serpent's Tail in 1999 and 2000 and were also critically well received. The series, which had initially struggled to find a US publisher, was published in the US by Mysterious Press, and translated into Italian, Japanese, French and Portuguese.

=== Other work ===
Carter's subsequent books include two crime novels set in Chicago, Jackson Park and Trip Wire, and most recently the supernatural thriller Beauty in the Blood, which received a starred review from Publishers Weekly and was described by The New York Times as "a fusion of detective fiction and horror that is impossible to look away from".

=== Nanette Hayes reissue ===
The Nanette Hayes series was reissued in 2021 by Vintage Crime/Black Lizard in the US, and in 2022 by Baskerville in the UK. Carter made minor changes to the books for the reissue. Caitlin Landuyt, their US editor, wrote of the decision to reissue the books that they "address racism, colorism, classism, and sexism head on" and are "bold and powerful", while editorial director Jade Chandler at Baskerville wrote that the series was "a landmark publication in a genre which is still - even now - seriously lacking in books by writers of colour".

=== Influences ===
Carter's early work was influenced by the New York experimental writing scene that she was part of, and by writers including Paul Bowles, whom she studied with in Morocco. The Nanette Hayes series was influenced by the crime novels of Chester Himes, and reviewers have identified Carter's interest in jazz as playing a role in the structure and language of the Nanette novels.

== Works ==
- Sheltered Life (1975)
- Personal Effects (1991)
- Rhode Island Red (1997)
- Coq Au Vin (1999)
- Drumsticks (2000)
- Walking Bones (2002)
- Jackson Park (2003)
- Trip Wire (2005)
- Beauty in the Blood (2025)

== Personal life ==
Carter lived in Morocco and Paris in the 1980s before returning to New York.

Before writing the Nanette Hayes books she worked as a copyeditor and proofreader, and as an editor for Cemetery Business and Legal Guide. She and Franklin B. King married in the late 1990s, and remained together until King's death in 2015.
