= Jess Davies =

Welsh radio personality, influencer and model

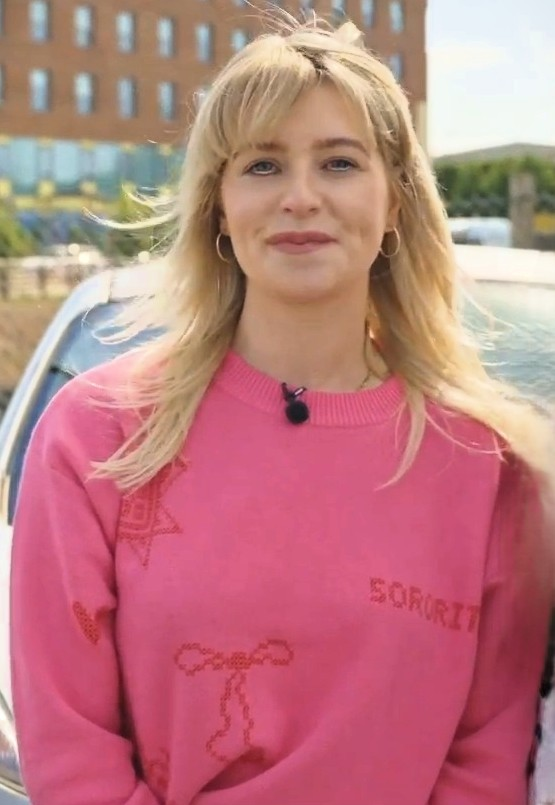
- Davies in a 2025 Welsh Government video
- Born: Jessica Davies; 11 April 1993 (age 33); Hereford, Herefordshire, England
- Occupations: Radio personality; TV presenter; campaigner; influencer; glamour model
- Years active: 2010–present
- Modelling information
- Height: 5 ft 6 in (168 cm)
- Hair colour: Blonde
- Eye colour: Blue

Jessica Davies (born 11 April 1993) is a Welsh radio personality, TV presenter, campaigner, influencer and former glamour model.

Davies was born in Hereford, England but moved to Aberystwyth, Ceredigion in Wales in her early years. She is a fluent Welsh language speaker as she learnt at her local Welsh school in her village.

== Career ==
Davies modelled for Zoo Magazine, Nuts and FHM magazines after competing in the final of the 2010 Miss Wales beauty pageant.

She balanced her modelling career with studying for a degree in Sociology at the University of Glamorgan. With the closure of Lads mags, Davies's modelling opportunities diminished. She has pivoted to other careers in the media.

Davies has presented documentaries and digital series for Welsh language broadcaster S4C. She has also worked for Welsh language BBC Radio Cymru and BBC Radio Wales

Her BBC Three documentary When Nudes Are Stolen uncovered the trade of leaked and stolen content. Pictures of Davies had been used to con money out of men all over the world. Davies traces where and how her pictures are being used and explains the effect it's had on her life.

Davies has been a campaigner for women's rights and body positivity. She has written a book, published in 2025, called No One Wants to See Your D*ck about understanding and tackling online misogyny.
