= Jessica Brown =

Jessica Brown is Professor of Philosophy at the University of St Andrews. She researches epistemology, philosophical responsibility and methodology. Her main publications include Anti-Individualism and Knowledge (2004), Fallibilism: Evidence and Knowledge (2018) and Groups as Epistemic and Moral Agents (2024).

== Education and career ==
Jessica Brown received her PhD at Oxford University. She is a Professor of Philosophy in the Arché Philosophical Research Centre for Logic, Language, Metaphysics and Epistemology at the University of St Andrews.

She was elected a Fellow of the Royal Society of Edinburgh in 2018.

== Research ==
Brown's interests are on epistemology, more precisely on contextualism, invariantism and pragmatic encroachment.

== Selected works ==
- Brown, J. (2004) Anti-Individualism and Knowledge. Cambridge: MIT Press.
- Brown, J. & Gerken, M. (Eds.). (2012). Knowledge Ascriptions. Oxford: Oxford University Press.
- Brown, J. (Ed.). (2011). Assertion: New Philosophical Essays. Oxford: Oxford University Press.
- Brown, J. (2018). Fallibism: Evidence and Knowledge. Oxford: Oxford University Press.
- Brown, J. (2024). Groups as Epistemic and Moral Agents. Oxford: Oxford University Press.
