= Grace Horrell =

Welsh footballer (born 2001)

Grace Seren Horrell-Thomas
Personal information
- Full name: Grace Seren Horrell
- Date of birth: 25 November 2001 (age 24)
- Place of birth: Cheltenham, England
- Height: 5 ft 8 in (1.73 m)
- Positions: Forward; full back; goalkeeper

Team information
- Current team: Cardiff City

Youth career
- Cardiff City

Senior career*
Years	Team	Apps	(Gls)
2015-?	Barry Town		
2018-2019	Cardiff City	32	(10)
2020-	Cardiff City	13	(3)

International career^{‡}
2016–2017	Wales U-17	5	(1)
2018–2019	Wales U-19	6	(1)
2019–	Wales	1	(0)
- * Club domestic league appearances and goals ‡ National team caps and goals as of 7 October 2019

Grace Seren Horrell-Thomas (born 25 November 2001) is a Welsh footballer who plays predominantly as a forward for Cardiff City Ladies and the Wales Women's National team.
