= British Ladies' Football Club =

- Full name: British Ladies' Football Club
- Founded: 1895
- Dissolved: c. 1897
colours

The British Ladies' Football Club was a women's association football team formed in Great Britain in 1895. The team, one of the first women's football clubs, had as its patron Lady Florence Dixie, an aristocrat from Dumfries, and its first captain was Nettie Honeyball.

The club's first public match took place at Crouch End, London on 23 March 1895, between teams representing 'The North' and 'The South'. The North won 7–1 in front of an estimated 11,000 spectators. The club and its associated teams under different names played matches regularly until April 1897. It was briefly revived in 1902–03.

== Precursors ==
Until the 19th century, women's participation in football was limited to folk rituals linked with marriage customs. In Inverness, for example, single women would annually play a match with married women, whilst prospective husbands watched from the sidelines.

The first recorded women's match was on 7 May 1881, at Edinburgh's Hibernian Park, billed as a Scotland–England international and organised by two theatre entrepreneurs. The final result was 3–0 to Scotland. On 16 May the teams played in Glasgow to a crowd of more than 5,000, a match abandoned after a violent pitch invasion during which the women were "roughly jostled", and chased by a mob as they left the grounds. Further games resulted in similar pitch invasions, which soon ended this early attempt to introduce women's football. (The 1881 teams have no known connection to the 1895 British teams.)

It is uncertain, from the coverage of the time, what the pitch invasions were in protest against. However, the press tone, which would dominate coverage of women's football for the next century, was clearly established in 1881: barely disguised contempt regarding player appearance, including costume, and the standard of play, overlaid with a certainty that football was a rough man's game unsuitable for women.

Other women's football clubs were reported to exist in 1889, in England, Scotland and Canada.

== Club history ==
=== Foundation ===
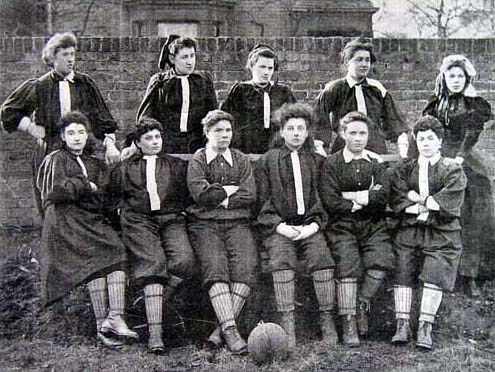
British Ladies' "North" team, pictured on 23 March 1895

A new club was inaugurated by Alfred Hewitt Smith and Nettie Honeyball, the British Ladies' Football Club, founded in late 1894. Lady Florence Dixie, the youngest daughter of the Marquess of Queensberry, acted as chairman and sponsor. In 1894, an advertisement was placed in the Daily Graphic seeking those interested in forming a football club for women which attracted around 30 women, who trained twice weekly under the tutelage of Tottenham Hotspur wing-half Bill Julian.

=== Reception ===
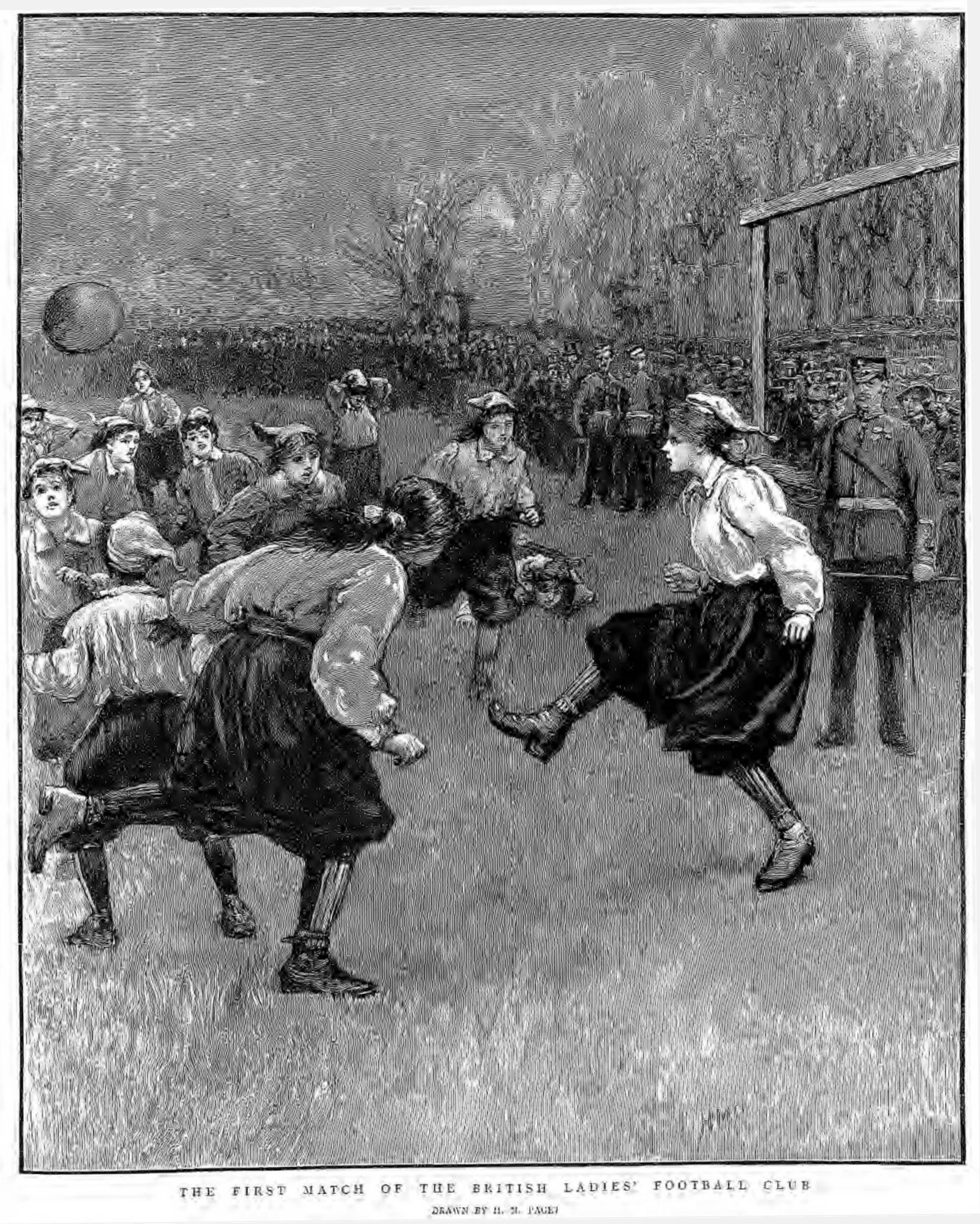
Illustration of the first match of the British Ladies' FC on The Graphic, March 1895

The club divided into a north and south team and on 23 March 1895, 10,000 (Note: Variously reported in newspapers at the time as up to 11,000) spectators watched the inaugural game at Alexandra Park, Crouch End, London. Unlike in the matches of 1881, players no longer had to wear corsets and high-heeled boots, but acquired standard man's boots in suitable sizes. The teams wore loose blouses and black knickerbockers, brown leather boots and leg pads. This kit was called Rational Dress after the movement opposing tight corsets, high heels, and unwieldy skirts.They still had to wear bonnets, with the game being stopped if any woman headed the ball and it dislodged either bonnet or hairpin which had to be replaced before the game could resume.

The reaction was generally one of being heckled by the crowd, and press censure, bordering on derision.

Despite this, the club went on tour, sponsored by Lady Dixie, and in the following two years played some 100 exhibition matches. The tour attracted great publicity from the press, though not entirely restricted to the sport as, at the time, women playing football was intricately linked to the 'Rights question'.

The British Ladies' played their second match at Preston Park on 6 April 1895. The following game at Bury was attended by 5,000. The team played exhibition matches in Reading, Maidenhead, New Brompton, Walsall and Newcastle, where the North beat South 4–3 at St James' Park with more than 8,000 spectators attending the match. Tour continued in South Shields and Darlington. Only 400 spectators attended the match at Jesmond.

Midfielder Daisy Allen (who was believed to be only 11 years old, being the youngest player of the team by far) was one of the most notable players of the British Ladies'. The Bury Times described her as "a small four feet goblin", while The Bristol Times wrote (she was) "a brave young girl that leaded her teammates with great courage, showing that she ruled the rudiments of the game, unlike the rest of the team".

As well as its usual name, and North and South, other team names that were used by the club were the Lady Footballers, Original Lady Footballers, and after a dispute with Nettie Honeyball, an offshoot team was fielded under the titles Original British Ladies or Mrs Graham's XI. Helen Matthew ("Mrs Graham") led this team in matches from November 1895 to June 1896.

The strain of playing so often took its toll, and by September 1896 the ladies could only field a few players. They were also broke, and arriving in Exeter found they had insufficient funds to either leave or pay their hotel bill. Appeals to the mayor of Exeter fell on deaf ears and he refused to pay. The ladies had to be rescued by friends, and the activities of the club came to an end.

Women's football once again fell into obscurity until the First World War, when Lloyd George required women to work in factories whilst the men were at the front. On Christmas Day, 1916, the first recorded match between factory organised women's teams, occurred in Ulverston, Cumbria.

== Political agenda ==
In a year when the cultural, social and public concern over what was decent and what was unnatural were already focused, (Note: Oscar Wilde's trial began in April and concluded in May with his conviction for indecency against Lady Dixie's nephew Lord Alfred Douglas) football for women raised important issues within Victorian society, including dress reform, the feminine ideal, women's sexuality, and the rigid British class structure in a way that no other sport could.

Lady Dixie, a keen advocate of women's rights, believed that football was excellent for women's physiques, and predicted a day when it would be as popular with girls as with boys. Moreover, she was a supporter of the rational dress movement, which sought to liberate women from the corsets and petticoats of Victorian society. She, therefore, saw football as a weapon of subversion and a means of pushing the boundaries, since the members of the club played openly in knickers and blouses.

Nettie Honeyball was well aware of the political ramifications, telling an interviewer that:

There is nothing of the farcical nature about the British Ladies' Football Club. I founded the association late last year, with the fixed resolve of proving to the world that women are not the 'ornamental and useless' creatures men have pictured. I must confess my convictions on all matters, where the sexes are so widely divided, are all on the side of emancipation, and I look forward to the time when ladies may sit in Parliament and have a voice in the direction of affairs, especially those which concern them most.

== See also ==
- Football in the United Kingdom
- Women's football in England
- Women's football in Scotland
- Women's football in Wales
