= Middlesbrough F.C. Women =

Women's football club in England

Coordinates: 54°36′7.780″N 1°17′8.452″W

Middlesbrough
- Full name: Middlesbrough Football Club Women
- Nicknames: The Boro; Teessiders
- Short name: MFCW
- Founded: 1976; 50 years ago
- Ground: Bishopton Road West; Riverside Stadium
- Capacity: 1,800 (200 seated); Bishopton Road West
- Chairman: Steve Gibson
- Head coach: Joe Lillie
- League: FA Women's National League North
- 2025–26: FA Women's National League North, 5th of 12
- Website: mfc.co.uk
Home colours	Away colours	Third colours

Middlesbrough Football Club Women (/ˈmɪdəlzbrə/ MID-əlz-brə) is an English women's football club. Founded in 1976, they compete in the FA Women's National League North, the third level of English women's football, with home games played at Bishopton Road West, Stockton.

Middlesbrough were founding members of the Northern Combination in 1998, and spent much of their early history in the third and fourth tiers of woman's football, aside from a brief spell in the second tier FA Premier League Northern Division from 2002 to 2006. The club officially became re-affiliated with the men's team in 2023, following a period of independent ownership beginning in 2017.

Middlesbrough U19 work as part of the Middlesbrough College Football Academy, providing academic study and elite-level coaching. The team compete in the National Youth Football League, with home games played on the college grounds.

== History ==
=== Formation and early years (1976–2010) ===
Middlesbrough Football Club Women was formed in 1976. Originally known as Cleveland Spartans, they played in the Nottinghamshire Ladies League, and were coached by Middlesbrough players Mark Proctor and David Hodgson. The club reached the 1982 WFA Cup Final, losing 2–0 to Lowestoft. Middlesbrough later played in the Yorkshire and Humberside Ladies League.

In 1996 Marrie Wieczorek became full time manager. Under her guidance Middlesbrough won the 2001–02 Northern Combination, and were promoted to the FA Women's Premier League Northern Division. They remained in the Northern Division for four seasons, returning to the Northern Combination following relegation at the end of the 2005–06 season.

=== Ups and downs (2010–present) ===
In September 2010, Middlesbrough travelled to North Korea and played two friendly matches against April 25, losing 6–2, and Kalmaegi, losing 5–0. In 2012 Gemma Grainger was appointed manager, and the club finished the 2012–13 season in fourth place. Grainger left the club in 2013 due to commitments to the England U19 team, and was replaced by player-manager Samantha Leigh.

Crest 2017–2023

As a result of the restructuring of the FA Women's Premier League for the 2014–15 season, Middlesbrough competed in the newly formed FA Women's Premier League Northern Division One. Under new manager and owner Lindsey Stephenson, the club finished the season in fourth place. Middlesbrough won the 2015–16 Northern Division One, and were promoted to the Northern Premier Division. In their first season back in the third tier of woman's football, Middlesbrough achieved a second-place finish. In June 2017 the club unveiled a new crest.

In January 2020, Ben Fisher was announced as new chairman, while Marrie Wieczorek returned to the club as an ambassador. Middlesbrough reached the semi-finals of the 2019–20 FA National League Plate, losing 2–0 to Watford. On 24 August 2021, former Middlesbrough player Andy Campbell was appointed manager. Middlesbrough were relegated to the National League Division One North at the end of the 2021–22 season.

On 26 May 2023, the club officially became re-affiliated with the men's team, and Michael Mulhern was announced as manager. Middlesbrough played their first game at the Riverside Stadium on 17 September, a 0–0 draw against Stockport County. The club won the 2024–25 Division One North, and were promoted back to the National League North after three seasons.

== Kits ==
=== Kit suppliers and shirt sponsors ===
Period	Kit manufacturer	Shirt sponsor
2010–2015	Adidas	Wells Solutions
2015–2017	Adidas	Amigos Pizza
2017–2018	Adidas	Northern Coffee
2018–2020	Hummel	Northern Coffee
2020–2021	Hummel	Team Stokes Limited (TSL)
2021–2022	Hummel	Map Group (UK)
2022–2023	Erreà	Map Group (UK)
2023–2025	Erreà	Durata
2025–2026	Castore	Unibet
2026–	Castore	Midnite

== Stadium ==
During the 2000s, Middlesbrough played their home games at Central Avenue, Billingham Synthonia, before moving to Teesdale Park, Thornaby Football Club, in 2010. In July 2018, the club moved to Bedford Terrace, Billingham Town.

Since June 2022, Middlesbrough have played their home games at Bishopton Road West, Stockton Town. The stadium underwent a £1 million redevelopment in 2015, and now includes modern facilities and a 3G pitch. With affiliation into Middlesbrough Football Club in 2023, the team have select matches at the Riverside Stadium.

== Players ==
=== Current squad ===
As of 15 August 2026.

Note: Flags indicate national team as defined under FIFA eligibility rules; some limited exceptions apply. Players may hold more than one non-FIFA nationality.

No.	Pos.	Nation	Player
1	GK	ENG	Megan Borthwick
2	DF	ENG	Ellie Christon
3	DF	NIR	Sarah Robson
4	DF	ENG	Olivia Watt
5	DF	ENG	Ellen Packham
6	DF	ENG	Abby Towers
7	FW	ENG	Ellen Turnbull
8	MF	ENG	Leanna Giles
9	FW	ENG	Armani Maxwell
10	MF	ENG	Lauren Robson
11	FW	ENG	Bridget Galloway
12	FW	ENG	Erin Nelson

No.	Pos.	Nation	Player
13	GK	ENG	Ruby Cook
14	MF	ENG	Niamh Boothroyd (on loan from Sunderland)
15	MF	ENG	Eva Chapman
16	DF	ENG	Lois Husband
17	DF	ENG	Millie Bell (captain)
18	MF	ENG	Sarah Burn
19	FW	ENG	Becky Ferguson
20	FW	ENG	Annie Mitchell
22	DF	ENG	Grace Boyes
24	DF	ENG	Keira Skelton
25	FW	ENG	Maddie Myers
31	GK	ENG	Jessica Black

=== Under-19s and Academy ===
Middlesbrough U19 work as part of the Middlesbrough College Football Academy, a Pro Game Academy, providing academic study and elite-level coaching. The team compete in the National Youth Football League, with home games played on the college grounds.

== Club staff ==
As of 15 August 2026.

Executive Members
Role	Person
Chair of Club	(England) Steve Gibson
General Manager	(England) Ben Fisher

Management & Backroom Staff
Role	Person
Head Coach	(England) Joe Lillie
Assistant Head Coach	(England) Sarah Robson
Goalkeeping Coach	(England) Craig Turns
Strength & Conditioning	(England) Lee Phoenix
Strength & Conditioning	(England) Andy Woodward
Lead Sports Therapist	(England) Sarah Stones
Performance Analyst	(England) Jason Elgie

=== Managerial history ===
Dates	Name
1976–1980	(England) John Sims
1980–1982	(England) Andy Neal
1982	(England) Janet Turner
1996–2012	(England) Marrie Wieczorek
2012–2013	(England) Gemma Grainger
2013–2014	(England) Samantha Leigh
2014–2018	(England) Lindsey Stephenson
2018	(England) Kelsey Byrne
2018–2021	(England) Steph Fairless
2021–2023	(England) Andy Campbell
2023–2025	(England) Michael Mulhern
2025–	(England) Joe Lillie

== Honours ==
Middlesbrough Women honours
Competition	Titles	Seasons
Northern Combination Football League (level 3)	1	2001–02
FA National League Division One North (level 4)	2	2015–16, 2024–25

== See also ==
- Durham W.F.C.
- Newcastle United W.F.C.
- Sunderland A.F.C. Women
