= Nettie Honeyball =

English footballer

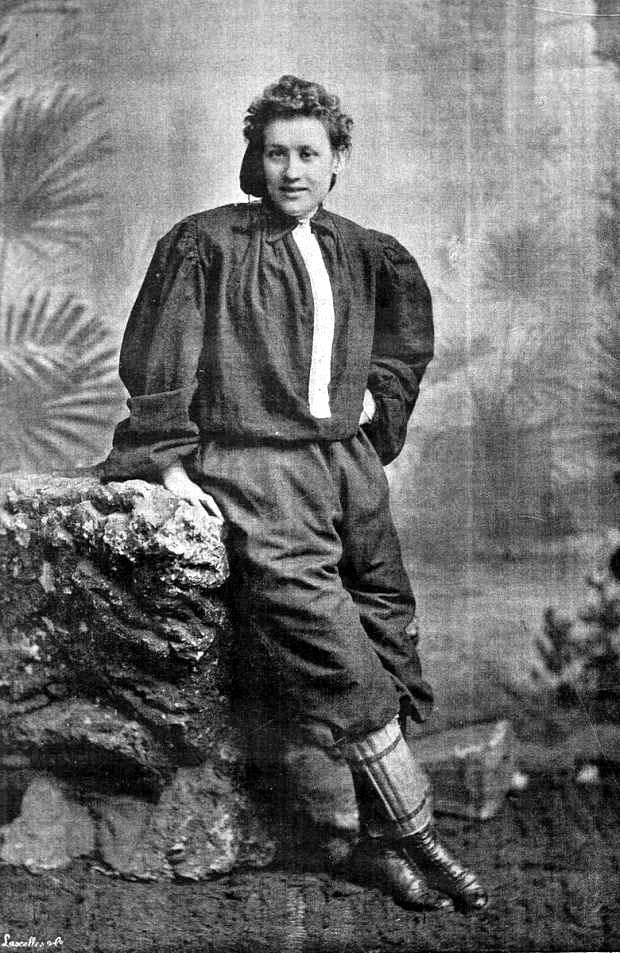
- Honeyball in British Ladies' Football Club clothes, c. 1895
- Years active: 1894–1895
- Known for: Feminist, football pioneer

Nettie Honeyball, also referred to as Nettie J. Honeyball, was a suffragist and the founder of the British Ladies' Football Club, the first known women's association football club, and one of their players until spring 1895.

== Early life ==
Previously, it was widely believed that she was born in Pimlico as Mary Hutson, the daughter of a carpenter and upholsterer, and that Nettie Honeyball was a pseudonym. However, in 2023 a newly-digitised newspaper linked her and the BLFC to an address in Belgravia where an Annie Jane Honeyball was living with her widowed father and his wife. Some scholars believe that Annie's cousin, Nellie Honeyball, also the daughter of a carpenter, may be the true identity of Nettie Honeyball. Others have also argued that Honeyball may be one Jessie Allen, while others have questioned her existence entirely. When Honeyball formed the BLFC, she was living in Crouch End.

== Career ==
In 1894, Honeyball began placing newspaper adverts for players for a women's football team. She later told reporters that her aim was to prove "that women are not the 'ornamental and useless' creatures men have pictured". Thirty women responded, and so the British Ladies' Football Club (BLFC) was formed by Honeyball and Lady Florence Dixie in 1895.

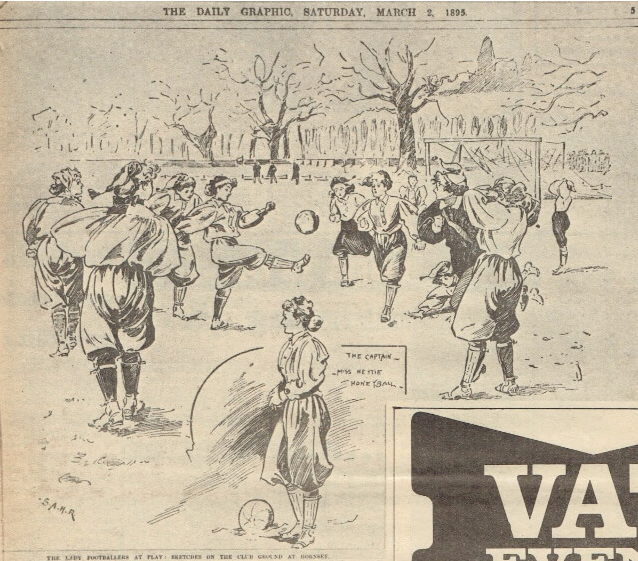
Sketch of Nettie Honeyball and others in the British Ladies Football Club playing in the first official women's football match in Alexandra Park, Crouch End in 1895 with Alexandra Palace in the background

The team was previously thought to have been largely composed of middle-class women, however there were also several players from more modest backgrounds. The club was keen to project an image of middle-class respectability in order to attract favourable press coverage and sponsorship, using Honeyball as a figurehead to this end. With Dixie as president of the club, Honeyball was the captain, and she also recruited Tottenham Hotspur player Bill Julian to coach the women. They were also coached by professional players from Millwall, reportedly training from one o'clock until dusk twice a week.

Honeyball described football as "a manly game that could be womanly as well." In a letter to a newspaper she wrote that "there is no reason why football should not be played by women, and played well, too, provided they dress rationally and relegate to limbo the straight-jacket attire in which fashion delights to clothe them". She believed that women's football could become popular as a sport rather than a spectacle, hoping that women would be able to make money from playing football, just as male football players did.

Following Honeyball's PR campaign, the BLFC's first match played under association rules was held on 23 March 1895 in Alexandra Park, Crouch End and had an attendance of over 12,000 people. Spectators paid to watch, with proceeds from the match, and successive BLFC matches, donated to local charities. Scottish suffragist Helen Matthews, known for forming Mrs Graham's XI, played for the BLFC in 1895. Honeyball's last recorded appearance for the BLFC was on 13 May 1895. Later in 1895 when the club went on a tour of Wales, it was reported that Jessie Allen had been appointed as club secretary due to Honeyball being taken ill. Honeyball is thought to have left the club in 1895 due to illness or injury.

Besides Honeyball's role in setting up the BLFC, she was an outspoken feminist and suffragist, telling a newspaper that she looked forward to a time when "ladies may sit in Parliament and have a voice in the direction of affairs, especially those that concern them the most".

== Legacy ==
Nettie Honeyball is considered a pioneer of women's football for her role in establishing the BLFC. A general lack of information about her life and the gradual disappearance of the BLFC after its initial success meant that Honeyball's contributions to the history of the sport went largely unrecognised for many years. However, in more recent years as women's football has seen an upsurge in popularity and more archive materials have been discovered, Honeyball's story has gained increased attention from historians and journalists.

In 2015, Honeyball's name inspired the title of BBC Alba documentary Honeyballers, which told the stories of Scottish pioneers of women's football and was aired following live coverage of a match in Scotland's campaign to qualify for the 2015 FIFA Women's World Cup.

Honeyball featured in the exhibition Goal Power at Brighton Museum in 2022. A photograph of her is on display at the National Football Museum along with artefacts including a 19th century women's football kit similar to the one she would have worn. "We only play under association rules... and we play for sake of pure sport only", a quote attributed to Honeyball, was displayed on the wall of the FIFA World Football Museum at the 2019 FIFA Women's World Cup in Paris.

Honeyball United WFC, a women's walking football club based in York, is named in her honour.

There is a sports brand named after her, and her name has also been used as a product name by other companies. She also inspired the perfume brand Nettie London.
