= Karen Carney =

English footballer and sports journalist (born 1987)

Karen Carney OBE
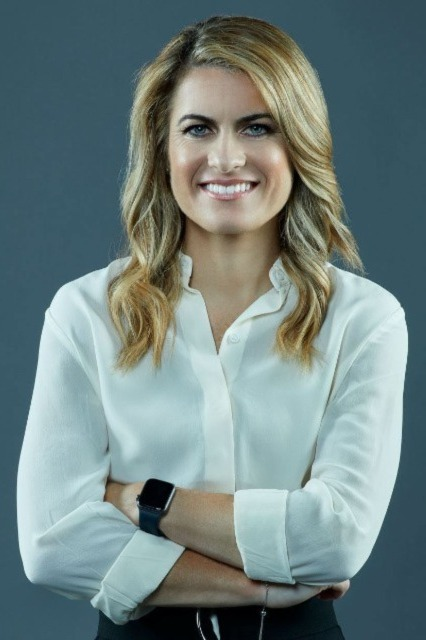
- Carney in 2022

Personal information
- Full name: Karen Julia Carney
- Date of birth: 1 August 1987 (age 39)
- Place of birth: Birmingham, England
- Height: 5 ft 4 in (1.62 m)
- Positions: Winger; midfielder

Youth career
- 1998–2006: Birmingham City

Senior career*
Years	Team	Apps	(Gls)
2006–2009	Arsenal	54	(28)
2009–2010	Chicago Red Stars	38	(3)
2011–2015	Birmingham City	50	(12)
2015–2019	Chelsea	36	(10)
Total		178	(53)

International career
2005–2019	England	144	(33)
2012	Great Britain	5	(0)
Medal record
Women's football
Representing England
FIFA Women's World Cup
Bronze medal – third place	2015 Canada
UEFA Women's Championship
Runner-up	2009 Finland
- * Club domestic league appearances and goals

Karen Julia Carney OBE (born 1 August 1987) is an English sports journalist and former professional footballer who played as a winger and midfielder. Carney has been a regular broadcaster for live football on TNT Sports, Sky Sports, ITV and Amazon Prime, including Women's Super League and men's Premier League matches since 2019. She is also a sports columnist for BBC Sport and The Guardian, and a pundit for BBC Radio 5 Live and BBC Television.

Carney began her career at Birmingham City and was twice named FA Young Player of the Year in 2005 and 2006. After signing with Arsenal, she experienced great success in 2006–07 winning the UEFA Women's Cup and all three domestic trophies: the FA Women's Premier League, FA Women's Cup, and the FA Women's Premier League Cup. Following two seasons with Chicago Red Stars in the American Women's Professional Soccer (WPS), Carney re-joined Birmingham City from 2011 to 2015. Carney finished her career with Chelsea where she was named Player of the Year in 2016 and captained the club to an FA Women's Cup title in 2017–18. She retired in July 2019.

Carney made her senior international debut for England in 2005. She represented England at four FIFA Women's World Cups (2007, 2011, 2015 and 2019) and at four UEFA Women's Championships (2005, 2009, 2013 and 2017). At the time of her retirement, she was the second most capped England player with 144 appearances, although this has since been surpassed by Jill Scott. She also represented Great Britain at the 2012 Summer Olympics.

In 2015, Carney was inducted into Birmingham City's Hall of Fame, and 2021, she was inducted into the English Football Hall of Fame. In 2017, she was appointed Member of the Order of the British Empire (MBE) and Officer of the Order of the British Empire (OBE) in the 2024 Birthday Honours for services to association football. In 2025, she won the twenty-third series of Strictly Come Dancing.

== Club career ==
=== Birmingham City, 2005–06 ===
Carney joined Birmingham City Ladies at the age of 11 and played at various age levels for the club alongside the likes of Eniola Aluko and Laura Bassett. She made her first-team debut for Birmingham City in the FA Women's Premier League National Division against Fulham Ladies at the age of 14. She earned FA National Young Player of the Year honours in 2005 and 2006.

=== Move to Arsenal, 2006–09 ===
Carney joined Arsenal Ladies on 13 July 2006, and played a major part in the team that won four major honours in the 2006/07 season: the FA Women's Premier League, FA Women's Cup, FA Women's Premier League Cup, and the UEFA Women's Cup. She made 21 appearances in the Premier League in her first season and scored 10 goals. In all competitions, she made 36 appearances and scored 13 goals. The following season saw Carney take on a greater role at Arsenal. She made 20 Premier League appearances and scored 10 goals. In all competitions, she made 34 appearances and scored 17 goals. 2008–09 marked Carney's final season with Arsenal. She made 13 Premier League appearances and scored eight goals. In all competitions, she made 21 appearances and scored 12 goals.

=== Chicago Red Stars, 2009–10 ===
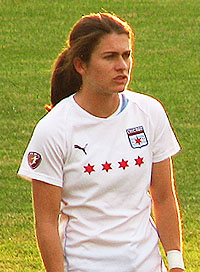
Carney playing for the Chicago Red Stars, 2009

After a new professional league was announced in the United States, Carney was selected by Chicago Red Stars in the third round (19th overall) of the 2008 WPS International Draft. The Red Stars made Carney their first signing on 27 January 2009. It was confirmed the following day by Arsenal. She joined Head Coach Emma Hayes, who had served as Arsenal's first team assistant coach.

In the inaugural 2009 Women's Professional Soccer season, Carney appeared in and started 17 games (1471 minutes) and scored two goals while assisting on another. She scored her first goal for the club during a 4–0 win against the Boston Breakers. The Red Stars finished in sixth place with a 5–10–5 record.

During the 2010 season, Carney competed in 21 matches. She scored the game-winning goal against Sky Blue FC on 2 August lifting Chicago to a 2–1 win on her birthday. The Red Stars finished the regular season in sixth place with a 7–11–6 record.

=== Return to Birmingham City, 2011–15 ===
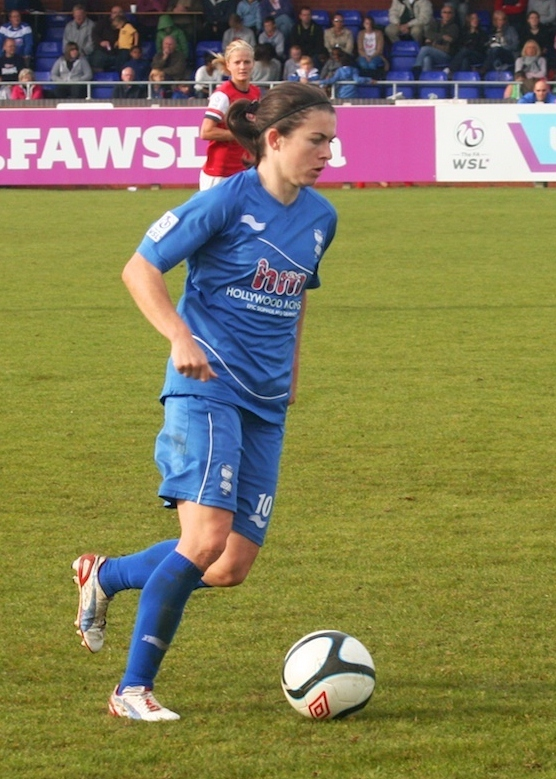
Carney playing for Birmingham City, October 2012

After Chicago Red Stars folded ahead of the 2011 season, Carney re-signed for Birmingham City. During the 2011 FA WSL, she started in all 13 matches and scored 3 goals helping lift the club to a second-place finish. During a 4–0 win against Bristol City, Carney scored a brace. She scored the game-winning goal in a 2–1 win against Arsenal on 28 April.

During the 2012 season, Carney started in all 14 matches and scored 3 goals. Birmingham City finished in second place with a 7–2–5 record. She scored the winning goal and was Player of the Match in the 2012 FA Women's Cup Final. Due to national team obligations, Carney competed in six matches for Birmingham City during the 2013 season. The club finished in fourth place with a 5–6–3 record.

Carney was a starting player during the 2014 season in all 14 matches. Her 6 goals ranked her first on the team and tied for top in the league. During a match against Manchester City on October 5, her brace led Birmingham City to a 2–1 win. In October 2014 Carney was fined and received a one-match suspension for an incident in July when she told opposition player Natalia Pablos to "fuck off back to Spain". In the last game of the 2014 FA WSL season, she missed a penalty in Birmingham City's 2–2 draw with Notts County that might have led to a league title. Birmingham City finished in third place during the regular season with a 7–3–4 record.

Carney was the first woman inducted into Birmingham City's Hall of Fame in March 2015. She scored two penalties in Birmingham's 3–0 win at relegation-bound Bristol Academy in September 2015, to help secure the club's WSL 1 status. Despite national team duty at the 2015 FIFA Women's World Cup in Canada, Carney finished the 2015 season with three goals in 11 matches. Birmingham City finished in sixth place with a 4–7–7 record.

=== Chelsea, 2016–19 ===
In December 2015, Carney left Birmingham for the second time in her career, transferring to FA WSL champions Chelsea on a two-year contract. She was described as "world-class" by Chelsea manager Emma Hayes, who previously worked with Carney at Arsenal and Chicago Red Stars.

"She can make a massive difference. She is a very experienced international player, who has great quality and vision with the ball at her feet. She has been the real playmaker for both her former club Birmingham and for England as well, so it was a no-brainer for Chelsea to go after her."

— Kelly Smith, MBE

During the 2016 FA WSL, Carney scored 3 goals in 16 matches. Chelsea finished in second place with a 12–3–1 record. She scored the game-opening goal in the club's 4–1 win against Doncaster on 24 March off a penalty. After the match, Hayes noted, "Karen Carney was at the heart and the core of everything, especially in the first half, and she looks like she's been playing at Chelsea for years. I thought she was instrumental in everything we did, whether she was on the left side, down the middle, or on the right." She scored Chelsea's second goal in the 4th minute of a 4–0 against her former club, Birmingham City on 28 August, in her hometown of Solihull. She was named the club's Player of the Year and was short-listed for England Women's Player of the Year.

After extending her contract with Chelsea through 2020, Carney's four goals in the seven matches she competed in during the 2017 FA WSL ranked third in the league. Chelsea finished in first place during the regular season with a 6–1–1 record. During the 2017–18 FA WSL season, she scored three goals in eight matches, including a brace against Yeovil on 29 October. Chelsea won the league title as well as the 2017–18 FA Women's Cup.

In October 2018, Carney's ninth-minute penalty goal captained Chelsea's 1–0 Women's Champions League win over Fiorentina. Carney was named to the 2018–19 Women's Champions League Squad of the Season . Following the match, Carney experienced sexist, death and abuse threats by an Instagram user after the match. The user was banned from the social media platform for threatening and abusive behaviour. Although Carney declined to press charges, England's Football Association called for police involvement. During her final season with the club, Carney scored one goal in 14 matches in the 2018–19 FA WSL.

== International career ==
=== England ===
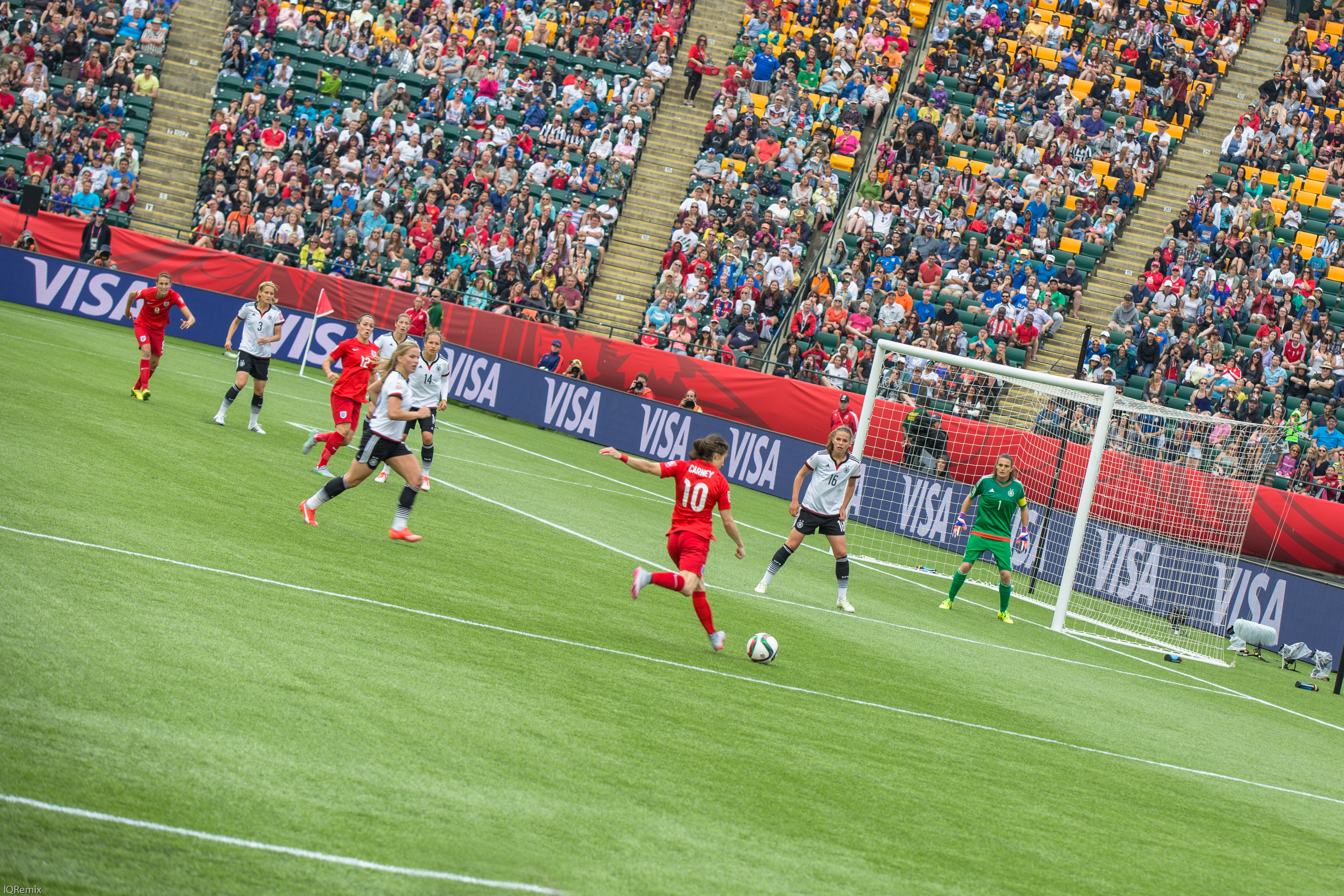
Carney shoots during a match against Germany at the 2015 FIFA Women's World Cup in Canada.

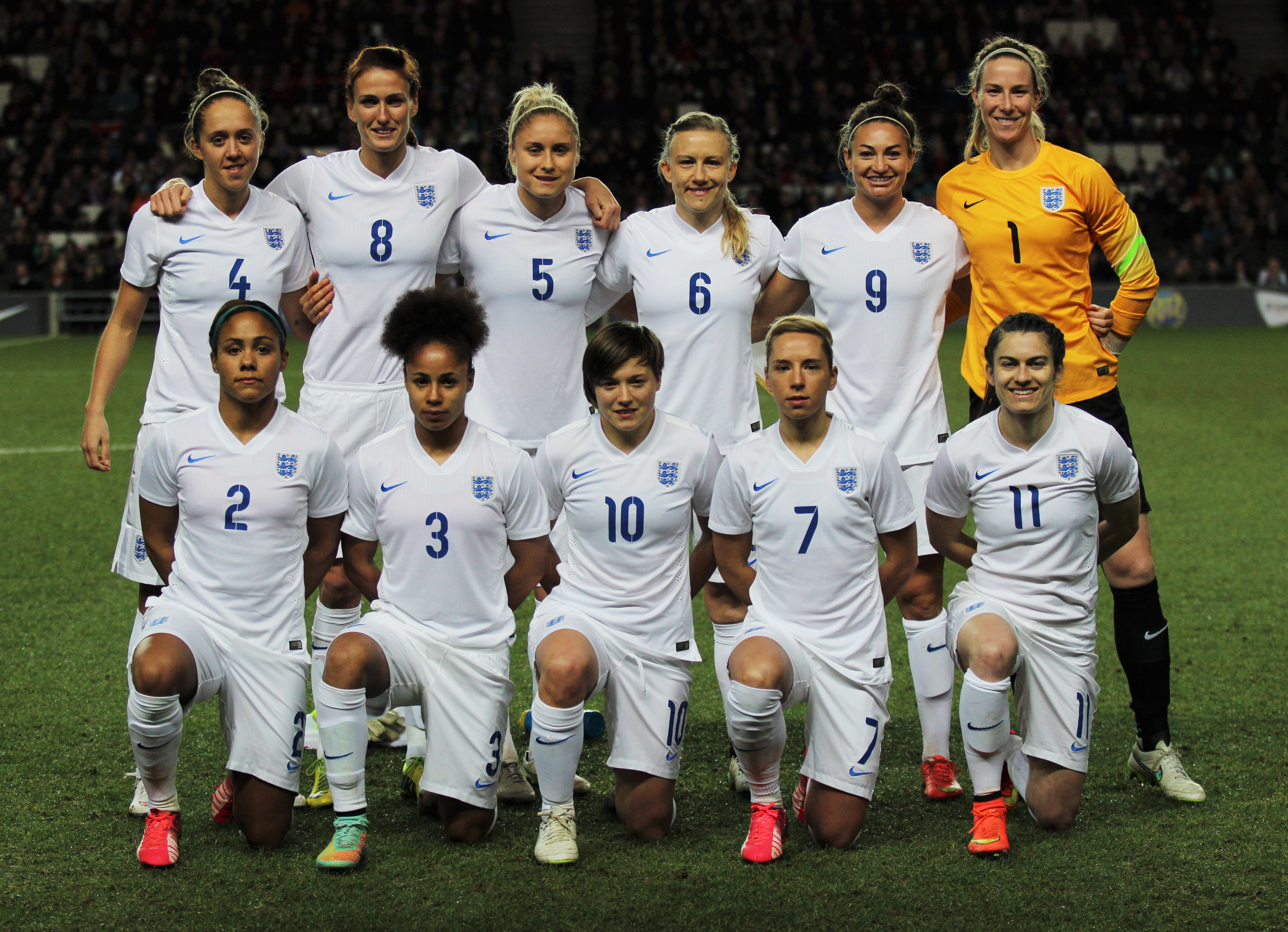
Carney in England's team ahead of a 2015 match against USA

Carney made her senior international debut in England's 4–1 victory over Italy in 2005, coming off the bench to score England's fourth goal. She was the youngest player to earn a senior debut during Hope Powell's tenure as England coach. The same year, she was an integral part of the team at the UEFA Women's Euro 2005 and scored a last-minute, game-winning goal in the 3–2 win over Finland, which earned her significant media attention.

In her late teens, Carney won FA Young Player of the Year in 2005 and 2006. In August 2009, she was named to Powell's national team squad for Euro 2009. In the semi-final win over the Netherlands, Powell utilised 20-year-old Jessica Clarke's pace and energy to tire the Dutch full-backs, before introducing substitute Carney to decisive effect.

On 23 November 2014, Carney competed in her 100th senior international match in a 3–0 loss to Germany at Wembley Stadium in front of a record 45,619 fans. Carney was the youngest and the eighth player to earn 100 caps for England. The match marked the first time a women's national team game had been played at the new Wembley Stadium since it re-opened in 2007. Carney stated the game was her favourite moment in her career: "Getting my 100th cap for England was a real honour... It's every boy's dream to play at Wembley so for me being a girl and leading the national team out at one of the most iconic stadiums in the world is a moment I will never forget."

In May 2015, England manager Mark Sampson named Carney in his final squad for the 2015 FIFA Women's World Cup, hosted in Canada. Carney scored in England's 2–1 group stage wins over Mexico and Colombia. England eventually finished third.

Carney was named to the 2019 England World Cup squad, and earned her 141st cap in England's first match against Scotland. On 5 July 2019, Carney announced that she would retire after the World Cup third-place final match against Sweden. England lost the match 2–1, and the match saw an Ellen White goal disallowed due to handball.

Carney was allotted 160 when the FA announced their legacy numbers scheme to honour the 50th anniversary of England’s inaugural international.

=== Great Britain ===
In June 2012, Carney was named in the 18-player Great Britain squad for the 2012 Summer Olympics in London. She played in all four games as Great Britain were beaten 2–0 by Canada in the last eight.

== Post-playing career ==
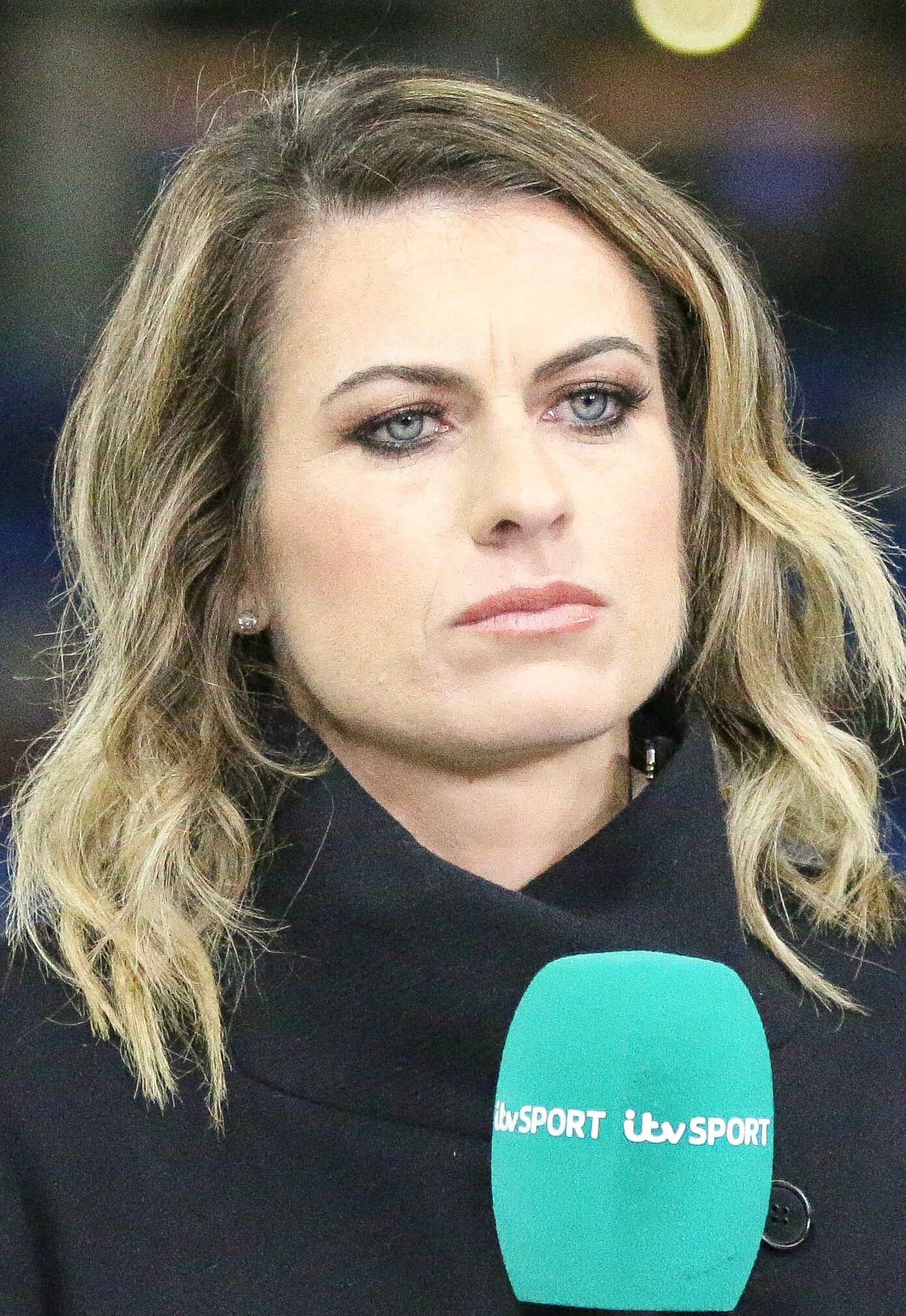
Carney presenting for ITV Sport

Carney and Liesel Jolly co-created "the Second Half"; a programme supporting women footballers in their careers post-football.

In August 2022, Carney was appointed Chair of the Future of Women's Football Review for the Department for Digital, Culture, Media and Sport, looking into ways the Government can nurture and expand the game in the UK. The review was published in July 2023 and called for massive changes across the women's game in England.

In February 2026, it was announced that Carney had become a minority owner of Birmingham City following the takeover of the women's side by Shelby Companies Limited.

In August 2026, Carney was announced as the recipient of that year's PFA Merit Award from the Professional Footballers Association.

=== Media career ===
In September 2021, Carney joined Sky Sports as lead Women's Super League pundit.

In 2022, Carney joined ITV's coverage of England's women's team, the FA Cup, the 2022 FIFA World Cup and the Euro 2024 finals. Carney has commentated on Champions League matches for CBS Sports. In September 2024, it was announced that Carney had joined the TNT Sports football broadcast team.

In August 2025, Carney was announced as a contestant on the twenty-third series of Strictly Come Dancing. She was partnered with Carlos Gu, and the pair went on to win the competition, with Carney becoming the first footballer to win the show.

== Personal life ==
Carney is from Birmingham. She was born in Hall Green and attended St. Ambrose Barlow Catholic Primary School and St. Peter's RC Secondary School, Solihull. Asked about her origins and outlook in June 2019, she said, "I'm from Birmingham: my mum works at Sainsbury's, my dad is a fire-fighter. We keep it real. We know who we are. I don't need a Bentley; I don't need a Rolex”.

Carney graduated with a Bachelor of Science Degree from Loughborough University in Sports and Exercise Science with a specialisation in Physiology and Sports Psychology. Her dissertation was on "The impact of caffeine on repeated sprint performance in elite female football". In 2013, she graduated from the University of Gloucestershire with a Master of Science in Sports Psychology with a specialisation in Performance Psychology. Her dissertation was on "video analysis and coach reflection of team talks within football". In October 2022, she graduated from the Longford International College, Ireland with a Master of Business Administration.

Carney was appointed Member of the Order of the British Empire (MBE) in the 2017 New Year Honours and Officer of the Order of the British Empire (OBE) in the 2024 Birthday Honours for services to association football.

Carney is a vegan and credits the diet for improving both her physical and mental health.

During her playing career, Carney was nicknamed "The Wizard".

== Career statistics ==
=== International goals ===
Scores and results list England's goal tally first, score column indicates score after each Carney goal.

List of international goals scored by Karen Carney
No.	Date	Venue	Opponent	Score	Result	Competition
1	17 February 2005	National Hockey Stadium, Milton Keynes	Italy	1–0	4–1	Friendly
2	9 March 2005	Paderne	Northern Ireland	4–0	4–0	2005 Algarve Cup
3	5 June 2005	City of Manchester Stadium, Manchester	Finland	3–2	3–2	UEFA Women's Euro 2005
4	9 March 2006	Carrow Road, Norwich	Iceland	1–0	1–0	Friendly
5	8 March 2007	National Hockey Stadium, Milton Keynes	Russia	3–0	6–0	Friendly
6	25 November 2007	New Meadow, Shrewsbury	Spain	1–0	1–0	2009 UEFA Women's Euro qualifying
7	28 September 2008	Ďolíček, Prague	Czech Republic	3–1	5–1	2009 UEFA Women's Euro qualifying
8	2 October 2008	Estadio Ruta de la Plata, Spain	Spain	1–2	2–2	2009 UEFA Women's Euro qualifying
9	7 March 2009	Paralimni Stadium, Paralimni	France	1–1	2–2	2009 Cyprus Women's Cup
10	28 August 2009	Finnair Stadium, Helsinki	Russia	1–2	3–2	UEFA Women's Euro 2009
11	10 September 2009	Olympic Stadium, Helsinki	Germany	1–2	2–6	UEFA Women's Euro 2009
12	17 May 2011	Kassam Stadium, Oxford	Sweden	2–0	2–0	Friendly
13	28 February 2012	GSP Stadium, Larnaca	Finland	2–1	3–1	2012 Cyprus Women's Cup
14	21 June 2012	Ob Jezeru, Velenje	Slovenia	3–0	4–0	UEFA Euro 2013 qualifying
15	21 September 2013	Dean Court, Bournemouth	Belarus	1–0	6–0	2015 FIFA Women's World Cup qualifying
16	21 September 2013	Dean Court, Bournemouth	Belarus	3–0	6–0	2015 FIFA Women's World Cup qualifying
17	21 September 2013	Dean Court, Bournemouth	Belarus	4–0	6–0	2015 FIFA Women's World Cup qualifying
18	5 March 2014	Ammochostos Stadium, Larnaca	Italy	1–0	2–0	2014 Cyprus Women's Cup
19	5 April 2014	Falmer Stadium, Brighton and Hove	Montenegro	5–0	9–0	2015 FIFA Women's World Cup qualifying
20	3 August 2014	Victoria Park, Hartlepool	Sweden	1–0	4–0	Friendly
21	3 August 2014	Victoria Park, Hartlepool	Sweden	4–0	4–0	Friendly
22	21 August 2014	Cardiff City Stadium, Cardiff	Wales	1–0	4–0	2015 FIFA Women's World Cup qualifying
23	17 September 2014	Stadion Pod Malim Brdom, Petrovac	Montenegro	2–0	10–0	2015 FIFA Women's World Cup qualifying
24	17 September 2014	Stadion Pod Malim Brdom, Petrovac	Montenegro	5–0	10–0	2015 FIFA Women's World Cup qualifying
25	13 June 2015	Moncton Stadium, Moncton	Mexico	1–0	2–1	2015 FIFA Women's World Cup
26	17 June 2015	Olympic Stadium, Montreal	Colombia	2–0	2–1	2015 FIFA Women's World Cup
27	12 April 2016	N/FSBIH Training Center, Zenica	Bosnia and Herzegovina	1–0	1–0	UEFA Euro 2017 qualifying
28	4 June 2016	Adams Park, Wycombe	Serbia	2–0	7–0	UEFA Euro 2017 qualifying
29	4 June 2016	Adams Park, Wycombe	Serbia	6–0	7–0	UEFA Euro 2017 qualifying
30	4 June 2016	Adams Park, Wycombe	Serbia	7–0	7–0	UEFA Euro 2017 qualifying
31	20 September 2016	Den Dreef, Leuven	Belgium	2–0	2–0	UEFA Euro 2017 qualifying
32	5 March 2019	Raymond James Stadium, Tampa, Florida	Japan	2–0	3–0	2019 SheBelieves Cup

== Honours ==
Birmingham City

- Women's FA Cup: 2012

Arsenal

- FA Women's Premier League National Division: 2005–06, 2006–07, 2007–08
- FA Women's Cup: 2005–06, 2006–07, 2007–08
- FA Women's Premier League Cup: 2006–07
- FA Women's Community Shield: 2005–06
- UEFA Women's Cup: 2006–07

Chelsea

- FA Women's Cup: 2017–18

England

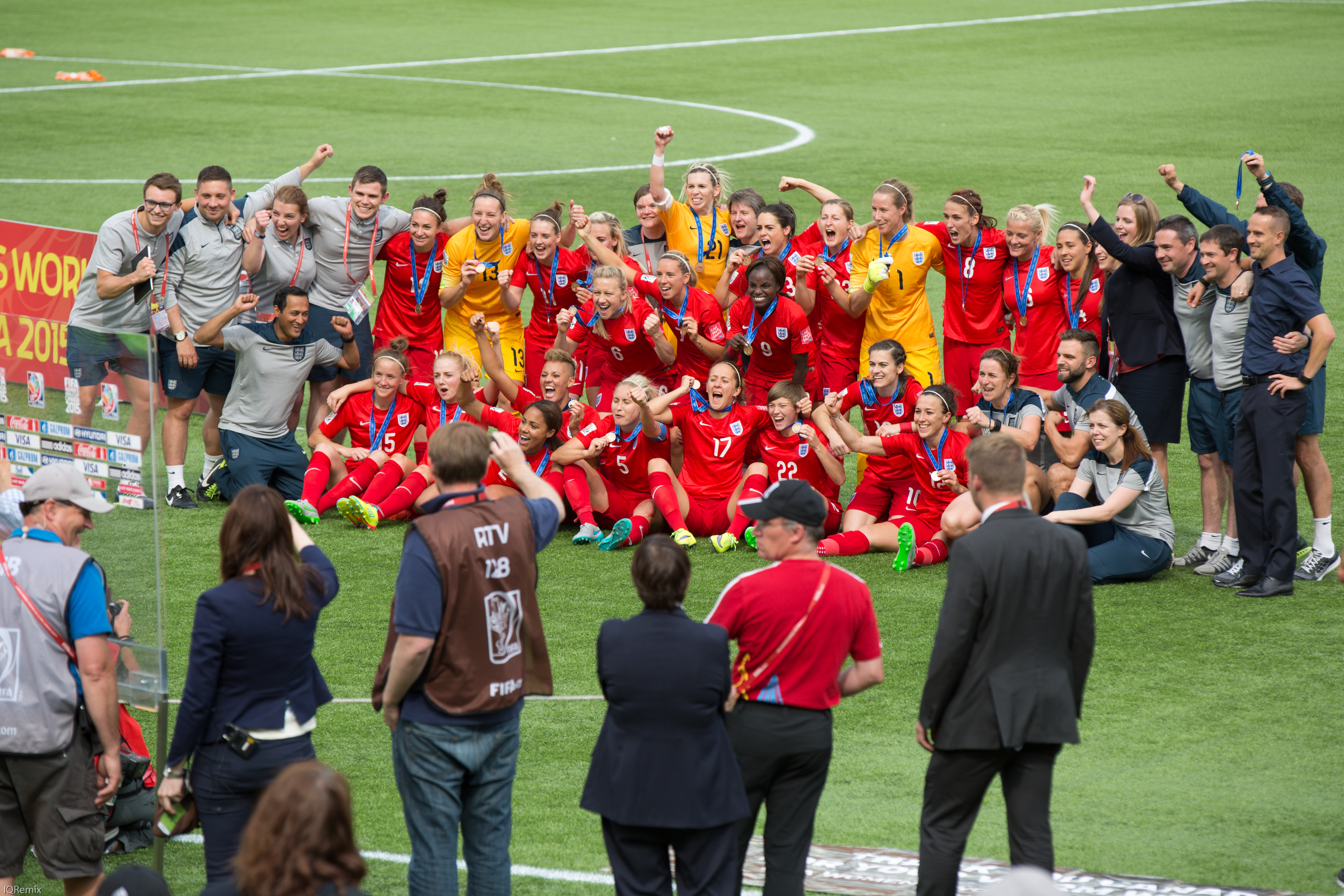
England celebrates its third-place finish at the 2015 FIFA Women's World Cup in Canada.

- Cyprus Cup: 2009, 2013, 2015
- UEFA Women's Championship runner-up: 2009
- FIFA Women's World Cup third place: 2015
- SheBelieves Cup: 2019

Individual

- FA International Young Player of the Year: 2005, 2006
- FA WSL Top Goalscorer: 2014
- Birmingham City F.C. Hall of Fame: 2015
- English Football Hall of Fame: 2021
- Women's Super League Hall of Fame: 2022
- PFA Merit Award: 2026

== See also ==
- List of women's footballers with 100 or more international caps
- List of UEFA Women's Championship goalscorers
- List of players who have appeared in multiple UEFA Women's Championships
- List of players who have appeared in multiple FIFA Women's World Cups
- List of England women's international footballers
- List of football personalities with British honours
- List of Chicago Red Stars players
