= Cheating in chess =

Cheating in chess is a deliberate violation of the rules of chess or other behaviour that is intended to give an unfair advantage to a player or team. Cheating can occur in many forms and can take place before, during, or after a game. Commonly cited instances of cheating include: collusion with spectators or other players, use of chess engines during play, rating manipulation, and violations of the touch-move rule. Many suspiciously motivated practices are not comprehensively covered by the rules of chess.

Even if an arguably unethical action is not covered explicitly by the rules, article 11.1 of the FIDE laws of chess states: "The players shall take no action that will bring the game of chess into disrepute." For example, while deliberately sneaking a captured piece back onto the board may be construed as an illegal move that is sanctioned by a time bonus to the opponent and a reinstatement of the last legal position, the rule forbidding actions that bring chess into disrepute may also be invoked to hand down a more severe sanction such as the loss of the game.

FIDE has covered the use of electronic devices and manipulating competitions in its Anti-Cheating Regulations, which must be enforced by the arbiter. (Note: Article 12.2.7 in FIDE Laws of Chess) Use of electronic devices by players is strictly forbidden. (Note: Articles 11.3.2.1 and 11.3.2.2 in FIDE Laws of Chess) Further, the FIDE Arbiter's manual contains detailed anti-cheating guidelines for arbiters. (Note: "CHAPTER 3: ANTI-CHEATING GUIDELINES (B06 ANNEX 6)" in FIDE Arbiter's manual) Online play is covered separately.

== History and culture ==
Cheating at chess is almost as old as the game itself, and may even have caused chess-related deaths. According to one legend, a dispute over cheating at chess led King Cnut of the North Sea Empire to murder a Danish nobleman. One of the most anthologized chess stories is Slippery Elm (1929) by Percival Wilde, which involves a ruse to allow a weak player to beat a much stronger one, using messages passed on slippery-elm throat lozenges. Television shows have engaged the plot of cheating in chess, including episodes of Mission: Impossible and Cheers.

=== Automaton hoaxes ===
In contrast to the modern methods of cheating by playing moves calculated by machines, in the 18th and 19th centuries, the public were hoaxed by the opposite deception in which machines played moves of hidden humans. The first and most famous of the chess automaton hoaxes was The Turk (1770), followed by Ajeeb (1868), and Mephisto (1886).

== Collusion ==
Over the years, there have been many accusations of collusion, either of players deliberately losing (often to help a friend or teammate get a title norm), or of players agreeing to draws to help both players in a tournament. One of the earliest evidences is with the Fifth American Chess Congress in 1880, when Preston Ware accused James Grundy of reneging on a deal to draw the game, with Grundy instead trying to play for a win. A newspaper article contemporary to the event stated, "Ware's avowal of his right to sell a game in a tourney was a novelty in chess ethics ... Ware's veracity has not been questioned, only his obliquity of moral vision ..." Six prior allegations of similar collusion and bribery, including another against Ware, were listed from 1876 to 1880 in that article on the Ware-Grundy affair, which was published in the Brooklyn Eagle on 8 February 1880.

Opinions differ over how effective collusion may be. For example, if a leading player draws his game, it may allow his rivals to gain ground on him by winning their games. During the Cold War, Soviet players were accused of colluding with each other as if they were playing for the same team—setting up easy draws with each other so that they could focus their attention and preparation on matches against non-Soviet players, or outright resignations if a favored player played a lesser player. The most famous alleged instance was at the 1962 Candidates Tournament for the 1963 World Chess Championship, where the three top-finishing Soviet players finished with draws in all their matches against each other. Journalist Nicholas Gilmore thought that Western Bloc accusations of Soviet collusion (especially by American Bobby Fischer) were "largely unfounded; but not completely", while a 2009 journal article by two economics professors argued that the Soviets did collude effectively during the period.

In 2011, IM Greg Shahade wrote that "prearrangement of results is extremely commonplace, even at the highest levels of chess. This especially holds true for draws... There is a bit of a code of silence at the top levels of chess." The subject had been partially broached (in the U.S. context) by Alex Yermolinsky a few years earlier, saying "It's no secret how people act when facing a last-round situation when a draw gives no prize ... People will just dump games, period." Concerning an incident involving 2006 US Championship qualification, Shahade blamed the Swiss system for creating perverse incentives. Frederic Friedel reported that the PCA had considered running a series of open tournaments in 1990s, but for similar reasons given by John Nunn ultimately declined, saying that deliberately losing games was "very real in the many open tournaments that are staged all over the world."

== Touch-move rule ==
In chess, the "touch-move" rule states that if a player (whose turn it is to move) touches one of their pieces, it must be moved if it has a legal move. In addition, if a piece is picked up and released on another square, the move must stand if it is a legal move. If an opponent's piece is touched, it must be captured if it is legal to do so. These rules are often difficult to enforce when the only witnesses are the two players themselves. Nevertheless, violations of these rules are considered to be cheating.

In one famous instance, Garry Kasparov changed his move against Judit Polgár in 1994 after momentarily letting go of a piece. Kasparov went on to win the game. The tournament officials had video records proving that his hand left the piece, but refused to release the evidence. A factor counting against Polgár was that she waited a whole day before complaining, and such claims must be made during the game. The videotape revealed that Kasparov did let go of the piece for one-quarter of a second. Cognitive psychologist Robert Solso stated that it is too short a time to make a conscious decision.

Another famous incident occurred in a game between Milan Matulović and István Bilek at the Sousse Interzonal in 1967. Matulović played a losing move but then took it back after saying "J'adoube" ("I adjust"—which should be announced before adjusting pieces on their square). His opponent complained to the arbiter but the modified move was allowed to stand. This incident earned Matulović the nickname "J'adoubović".

The 2003 European Championship saw a "takeback game" between Zurab Azmaiparashvili and Vladimir Malakhov, who eventually finished first and second respectively in the event. According to the book Smart Chip by Genna Sosonko:

Both grandmasters were fighting for the lead, and the encounter had huge sporting significance. In an ending that was favourable to him, Azmai[parashvili] picked up the bishop, intending to make a move with it instead of first exchanging rooks. Malakhov recalled: "Seeing that the rooks were still on the board, he said something like, "Oh, first the exchange, of course." put his bishop back, took my rook, and the game continued. I don't know what should have been done differently in this situation—in Azmai's place, some might have resigned immediately, and in my place, some would have demanded that he make a move with his bishop but I didn't want to ruin the logical development of the duel, so I didn't object when Azmai made a different move: the mistake was obviously nothing to do with chess! When we signed the score sheets, Azmai suggested to me that we consider the game a draw. After the game I was left with an unpleasant aftertaste, but that was due mainly to my own play."

== Illegal moves ==
Carlsen vs. Inarkiev, 2017 (blitz)

Position: b8 black rook, e8 black rook, b7 white rook, f7 black pawn, g7 black pawn, h7 black pawn, b6 black king, b5 white bishop, d5 black knight, c3 white pawn, f3 white pawn, c2 white king, g2 white pawn, h2 white pawn, b1 white rook

Black to move after 27.Rxb7+. 27...Ne3+?? 28.Kd3

A dishonest player can make an illegal move and hope their opponent does not notice. The rules of chess have had differing penalties for making an illegal move over time, varying from outright loss of the game on the spot to backing the game up and adding additional time to the other player's clock, but they only apply when the illegal move is noticed. Normally, illegal moves are simple mistakes from time pressure, but if made intentionally are considered cheating. Intentional use of an illegal move is rare in high level games. In all but the fastest matches, sufficiently skilled chess players have a strong mental picture of the board state such that a manipulation is obvious, and the penalties from making an illegal move mean that it is rarely worthwhile if the cheating player is caught.

A rare example where a high level player was accused of this was at the 2017 World Blitz Chess Championship in Riyadh. Ernesto Inarkiev was playing Magnus Carlsen, and with little time left on both players' clocks, Inarkiev made an illegal move by failing to remove Carlsen's preceding check. Instead, he checked Carlsen's king. Carlsen automatically moved his king out of check, but Inarkiev then claimed that Carlsen had made an illegal move, and that Carlsen's only legal play had been to point out Inarkiev's illegal move. The deputy arbiter agreed with Inarkiev's interpretation of the rules and awarded him the win. The decision was appealed and the initial ruling was overturned, with the new ruling to resume play. Inarkiev received criticism for gamesmanship for attempting to use his own illegal move as a way to win, and Carlsen took the win after Inarkiev refused to resume play.

=== Board manipulation ===
An extreme example of illegal moves is to outright manipulate the board such as by adjusting pieces on the border to the wrong square, removing opponent's pieces, or adding extra pieces to the cheater's own position, perhaps while the opponent is not at the board to observe or via sleight-of-hand techniques borrowed from close-up magic. This almost never happens in tournaments, but can happen in casual games where there is essentially no penalty for getting caught. A few "chess hustlers" playing casual games of speed chess for money in public parks have been caught using such techniques, although it is agreed that most hustlers do not cheat.

A rare possible example of physical piece manipulation at the grandmaster level involved removing captured off-the-board pieces. At the 2017 Canadian Championship in Montreal, GM Bator Sambuev was playing IM Nikolay Noritsyn in a blitz match. Noritsyn was in a good position but was extremely low on time, having less than ten seconds left. He moved a pawn to the eighth rank to promote, and FIDE rules require that pawns are replaced by their promoted piece before the move is complete and the clock can be pressed. Sambuev had the black queen concealed in his hand, and the arbiters had not made any spare queens available. Pressed for time, Noritsyn opted to use an upside-down rook to indicate he wanted a queen, rather than pause the game to complain that the queen was missing from the supply and ask for a spare. The angle shooting aspect came after the arbiters paused; rather than inform the arbiter that he had the queen in his hand and had forgotten to place it with the other previously captured pieces by accident, Sambuev quietly put the queen back with the others, and let the arbiters come to the conclusion that Noritsyn had simply erred in taking a rook. The arbiters ruled that the rook promotion stood. Sambuev went on to win the game, and Noritsyn's appeal after video showing Sambuev holding then replacing the queen was denied.

== Technology ==
Technology has been used by chess cheaters in several ways. The most common way is to use a chess program while playing chess remotely, such as on the Internet or in correspondence chess. Rather than play the game directly, the cheater simply inputs the moves so far into the program and follows its suggestions, essentially letting the program play for them. Electronic communication with an accomplice during face-to-face competitive chess is a similar type of cheating; the accomplice can either be using a computer program or else simply be a much better player than their associate. Modern chess websites will analyze games after the fact to give a probabilistic determination on whether a player received surreptitious help as part of an effort to detect and discourage such behaviors.

Attempting to compensate for latency in online play is a potential area for exploitation. Many chess programs attempt to make it so that a player's clock only starts running once they receive their opponent's move, to ensure fairness when two distant players are matched with each other. This allowed a number of stratagems if the client-side timing could be compromised, such as via pretending to have a very slow router, which would essentially put extra time on the cheater's clock. For example, the cheater might take 5 seconds to make a move after seeing their opponent's move, but their software would claim only 4 seconds were taken to the server—a significant advantage in rapidly paced games.

=== Incidents ===
Due to the great frequency of technological cheating incidents, the following examples concentrate only on those that are either at a high level, or are of historical significance.

==== High-profile ====
- In the 2010 FIDE Olympiad Tournament at Khanty-Mansiysk, three French players were caught in a scheme to use a computer program to decide moves. Their plan involved one player, Cyril Marzolo, following the tournament at home and using the computer program to decide the best moves. He would send the moves by SMS to the team coach, Arnaud Hauchard, who would then stand or sit at various tables as a signal to the player, Sébastien Feller, to make a certain move. Sébastien Feller was given a two-year and nine months suspension, Cyril Marzolo was given a one-year and six-month suspension, and Arnaud Hauchard was given a three-year suspension by the FIDE Ethics Commission. Unlike other cases, each player involved was a legitimate Grandmaster or International Master. None of the other players on the team knew of this or were involved.
- The scandals of Borislav Ivanov were cause célèbre in the chess world in 2012 and 2013, with cheating first being alleged at the Zadar Open, and then in Kyustendil. He was banned for four months by the Bulgarian Chess Federation, though this ban was overturned due to procedural defects, and was not based upon the cheating allegations, but rather Ivanov's rude behavior toward his accusers. After various interludes, he was banned permanently by the Bulgarian Chess Federation. The incidents were significant as they were one of the first times that statistical methods were used to analyze move-matching with computer programs, even though in the end such evidence was never used in a formal legal procedure.
- At the 2014 Iasi Open, Wesley Vermeulen was caught cheating by consulting a mobile phone in the toilet, admitted his offense, and was eventually banned for one year by both the Dutch chess federation and FIDE.
- In April 2015, Georgian grandmaster Gaioz Nigalidze was banned from the Dubai Open Chess Tournament after officials discovered him consulting a smartphone with chess software in the washroom during a game. He was later stripped of his grandmaster title and banned from competition for three years, though he was allowed to keep his International Master title.
- In February 2016, Sergey Aslanov was expelled from the Moscow Open, for a smartphone in the toilet, hidden under a loose tile behind a drainpipe. He declared himself to be guilty of error but not a crime, and was only suspended for one year.
- In July 2019, Igors Rausis was caught cheating in the Strasbourg Open, using a mobile phone in the bathroom. He admitted to having cheated, and announced his retirement from chess. He was stripped of his Grandmaster title in December of that year.
- On October 1, 2020, Wesley So accused Tigran L Petrosian (coincidentally, Nigalidze's opponent during the latter's 2015 incident), of cheating in his semi-final and final games during the Chess.com 2020 PRO Chess League. So was rated the eighth-highest player in the world at the time. Petrosian responded to So on Twitter with childish taunts. Chess.com found that Petrosian and by extension, his team, the Armenia Eagles, had violated fair play regulations. The team was disqualified and the Saint Louis Arch Bishops were subsequently crowned champions. Chess.com and the PRO Chess League both issued lifetime bans to Petrosian.
- In March 2021, an Indonesian player identified as Dadang Subur played a computer-assisted game against Levy Rozman, obtaining over 90% accuracy. Rozman identified a pattern of cheating and reported Dadang's account. The Indonesian media claimed that Dadang was a legitimate player, inciting an online firestorm against Rozman. Dadang's subsequent match against IM Irene Sukandar received 1.25 million live viewers on YouTube, a historic record for a chess stream. Dadang lost three consecutive matches to Sukandar, with an accuracy of less than 40%.
- In September 2022, World Champion Magnus Carlsen accused Hans Niemann of cheating during the 2022 Sinquefield Cup. A report from Chess.com alleged that Niemann had cheated in over 100 online games, including prize money events. The report found evidence of Niemann toggling to a different screen during moves, as well as concluding that Niemann had cheated against top players, including Daniel Naroditsky, Krikor Mekhitarian, David Paravyan, Ian Nepomniachtchi, and Benjamin Bok. Niemann had privately confessed to the allegations to Chess.com's chief chess officer, Daniel Rensch, and was banned from the platform. In October 2022, Niemann filed a $100 million lawsuit against Magnus Carlsen and Chess.com, accusing them of defamation. The lawsuit was dismissed in June 2023.
- In October 2024, Kirill Shevchenko was caught cheating during the Spanish Team Championship in Melilla after a mobile device was found in a toilet cubicle alongside a note with handwriting similar to his own. He was disqualified from the tournament and suspended for 75 days as a result. This was subsequently upgraded to a 3-year ban and, similarly to the Nigalidze case, the rescission of Shevchenko's grandmaster title while allowing him to keep his international master title.

==== Historical ====
- One of the earliest known cases of using technology to cheat occurred in the 1993 World Open. An unrated player using the name "John von Neumann" (not related to John von Neumann) won 4 1/2 out of 9 games in the Open Section, including a draw against a grandmaster. This player was wearing headphones during the tournament, and had a suspicious bulge in his pocket that buzzed during certain moments of the game. He was disqualified when the tournament director found that he lacked even a basic understanding of chess.
- The 1998 Böblingen Open saw Clemens Allwermann latterly accused of cheating using Fritz, and after an investigation by the district attorney was inconclusive as to the evidence, the Bavarian Chess Federation barred him from participating in future tournaments.
- In the Lampertheim Open Tournament 2002 the arbiter announced the disqualification of a player before round seven. Markus Keller explained what had happened:

In the sixth round a player came to me and said he suspected his opponent, W.S. from L., was using illicit aids during the game. He often left the board for protracted periods of time to go to the toilet, even when (especially when) it was his turn to play. He had done this in earlier rounds against other players as well. I watched W.S. and noticed that he played a number of moves very rapidly and then disappeared in the toilet. I followed him and could hear no sound coming from the stall. I looked under the door and saw that his feet were pointing sideways, so that he could not have been using the toilet. So I entered the neighbouring stall, stood on the toilet bowl and looked over the dividing wall. I saw W.S. standing there with a handheld PC which displayed a running chess program. He was using a stylus to operate it. I immediately disqualified the player. When confronted he claimed that he was only checking his emails, so I asked him to show me the computer, which he refused to do. There are witnesses for my investigation in the toilet, and we will ask the chess federation of our state to ban the player from playing in other tournaments.

- In the HB Global Chess Challenge 2005 (in Minneapolis, Minnesota), a player in the Under-2000 section exited the event under suspicion of cheating, while his final-round game was under way. According to tournament officials, he was caught repeatedly talking on his cell phone during his game—which the published rules for that event expressly prohibited. Directors suspected that he was receiving moves over the phone from an accomplice elsewhere in the building. His results were expunged from the tournament and an ethics complaint lodged. Six weeks later, the same player entered the World Open and tied for first through third place in the Under-2200 section, pocketing $5,833. An attempt was made to eject him midway through that event, when the organizers belatedly learned about the earlier incident in Minnesota. But, lacking any specific allegation that he was cheating in the World Open, they backtracked and re-admitted him after he threatened legal action.
- In the Subroto Mukerjee memorial international rating chess tournament 2006, an Indian chess player was banned from playing competitive chess for ten years due to cheating. During the tournament at Subroto Park, Umakant Sharma was caught receiving instructions from an accomplice using a chess computer via a Bluetooth-enabled device which had been sewn into his cap. His accomplices were outside the building, and were relaying moves from a computer simulation. Officials became suspicious after Sharma had made unusually large gains in rating points during the previous 18 months, even qualifying for the national championship. Umakant began the year with an average rating of 1933, and in 64 games gained over 500 points to attain a rating of 2484. Officials received multiple written complaints alleging that Umakant's moves were in exactly the same sequence suggested by the chess computer. Eventually, in the seventh round of the tournament, Indian Air Force officials searched the players on the top eight boards with a metal detector and found that Umakant was the only player who was cheating. Umakant's ten-year ban was imposed by the All India Chess Federation (AICF) after reviewing evidence presented by Umakant himself and the electronic devices seized by the tournament organizers. The penalty was considered harsh, especially considering that those in other sports who have been found to be doping and match fixing did not receive such lengthy suspensions. When officials were asked about the suspension they stated, "We wanted to be frank and send a stern message to all players. It is like cheating on exams."
- In the Philadelphia World Open 2006, Steve Rosenberg, who was playing in a lower section, was leading before the final round. A victory would have been worth about $18,000. He was confronted by a tournament director and found to be using a wireless transmitter and receiver called a "Phonito". He was disqualified from the event. In the same event, Eugene Varshavsky was also accused of cheating due to his unusually good performance for a low-ranked player and his moves matching up with the commercially available chess engine Shredder, although no cheating device or transmitter was found either on his person or in the bathroom stall he had been occupying.
- In a Dutch League 2C 2007 match between Bergen op Zoom and AAS, the arbiter caught the team captain of AAS (who was playing on board 6) using a PDA. The player was outside the playing hall, with permission, to get some fresh air. The arbiter had followed him and caught him using Pocket Fritz. On the screen, the current position of the game was shown. The arbiter declared the game lost and informed the Dutch Federation about the incident. The competition manager communicated a heavy penalty: the player was banned from playing in the Dutch League and Cup matches, not only for that season, but also for the next two seasons. The competition manager applied article 20.3 of the Federation's competition regulations.
- In the Dubai Open 2008, M. Sadatnajafi, an untitled Iranian player (rated 2288 at the time), was disqualified from the tournament after he was caught receiving suggested moves by text message on his mobile phone while playing Grandmaster Li Chao. The game was being relayed live over the Internet and it was alleged that his friends were following it and guiding him using a computer.
- In the 2009 Norths Chess Club Centenary Year Under 1600 Tournament, a 14-year-old boy was caught using what the arbiter called a "hand-held machine" in the toilets. The game was declared lost and the boy was expelled from the tournament. He was using the program Chessmaster on a PlayStation Portable. It was the first example of a chess player getting caught while using an electronic device in Australia, and so it quickly became a big story in the relatively small Australian chess community.
- In the German Chess Championship 2011, FM Christoph Natsidis used a chess program on his smartphone during his last-round game against GM Sebastian Siebrecht. Natsidis admitted that he had cheated, and was disqualified from the championship.
- At the 2012 Virginia Scholastic and Collegiate Championships, a player was caught using a chess engine running on a PDA. The player was disqualified from the tournament, had his membership to the Virginia Chess Federation suspended, and had an ethics complaint filed to the USCF. Unlike other incidents, the player was using the chess engine disguised as using eNotate, which is one of two electronic chess notation programs permitted to be used at USCF tournaments. While the player only admitted to using the chess engine in that one match, his results suggested he had been using the program for several tournaments.
- At the 2013 Cork Congress Chess Open, a 16-year-old player was found to be using a chess program on a smartphone when his opponent confronted him in the toilets by kicking down the cubicle door and physically hauling him out. The opponent received a ten-month ban for violent conduct. The 16-year-old player was banned for four months for cheating.
- In January 2016, the blind Norwegian player Stein Bjørnsen was accused of cheating after playing games that showed a very high correlation with computer analysis. Due to his disability, Bjørnsen had been allowed to keep a record of his moves with a recorder coupled to an ear plug. The ear plug was later found to be incompatible with the recorder, but capable of receiving messages by Bluetooth. In April 2016 he received a two-year ban on domestic competition from the Central Board of the Norwegian Chess Federation (NSF). Bjørnsen's appeal to the federation's rules committee was turned down in September 2016. Bjørnsen returned in 2018 after serving the ban. In March that year he was caught with a Bluetooth earpiece taped to his hand during a club tournament in Horten. The federation expelled Bjørnsen in May 2018.
- In June 2021, the Indian billionaire Nikhil Kamath cheated against former world champion Viswanathan Anand in a live simultaneous exhibition charity event organised by Chess.com. The website banned Kamath's account for violating its fair play policy. The incident led to heavy criticism and discussion on social media after which Kamath confessed to using analysts and computers during his game and responded by apologising for "causing confusion".
- In April 2025, DrLupo cheated in the Chess.com PogChamps tournament by using a chess engine. He was disqualified from the tournament. After initially denying it, he eventually admitted to cheating.

== Rating manipulation ==
Since the introduction of Elo ratings in the 1960s, a number of attempts have been made to manipulate the rating system, either to deliberately inflate one's rating or to disguise one's strength by deliberately losing rating points.

=== Sandbagging ===
Sandbagging involves deliberately losing rated games in order to lower one's rating so that one is eligible to enter the lower-rated section of a tournament with substantial prize money. This is most common in the United States, where the prize money for large open tournaments can be over $10,000, even in the lower-rated sections. Sandbagging is very difficult to detect and prove, so USCF has included minimum ratings based on previous ratings or money winnings to minimize the effect.

=== Small pools of players ===
A limited pool of players who rarely or never play against players from outside of that pool can cause distortions in the Elo rating system, especially if one or more of the players is significantly stronger than the others, or if the results are deliberately manipulated.

Claude Bloodgood was accused of manipulating the USCF rating system in this way; at his peak in 1996 his USCF rating was in excess of 2700, the second highest in the country at the time. As a long-term prison inmate, he was necessarily restricted in the range of opponents available to him. The USCF suspected that he had deliberately inflated the ratings of his opponents; Bloodgood denied this, attributing his inflated rating to a quirk in the rating system resulting from his regularly playing against a limited pool of much weaker players.

There was widespread reporting of anomalous Burmese (Myanmar) rating movements in the late 1990s, with Milan Novkovic giving an analysis of manipulation in Schach magazine.

=== False tournament reports ===
The most notable international example of ratings manipulation involves Romanian Alexandru Crișan, who allegedly falsified tournament reports to gain a Grandmaster title and was ranked 33rd in the world on the April 2001 FIDE rating list. A committee overseeing the matter recommended his rating be erased and his Grandmaster title revoked. While the Romanian Chess Federation initially favored action against Crișan, eventually he became the RCF president and changed the policy, creating such a situation that FIDE intervened to broker a resolution regarding many problems in the RCF, including Crișan's rating. Crișan then was arrested and imprisoned on fraud charges relating to his management of the company Urex Rovinari and disappeared from chess, thus failing to fulfill the conditions of the resolution and so activating the above recommendations regarding title revocation. FIDE did not fully update its online information until August 2015, when all his titles were removed and his rating adjusted downwards to 2132. When writing about the Crișan case, Ian Rogers alleges that Andrei Makarov (at the time a FIDE vice-president and Russian chess federation president) had arranged an IM title for himself through nonexistent tournaments in 1994.

Rumors of rigged tournaments are not unheard of in the chess world. For instance, in 2005, FIDE refused to ratify norms from the Alushta (Ukraine) tournaments, claiming that the games did not meet ethical expectations. A number of players involved protested over the matter. A different Ukrainian tournament in 2005 was found to be completely fake. Usually the strongest players are not involved in these, as they are more for careerist players to gain title norms or small rating gains, but Zurab Azmaiparashvili was alleged to have rigged the results of the Strumica tournament of 1995 to allow him to reach the chess elite. In 2003, Sveshnikov referred to these high-profile Crișan and Azmaiparashvili incidents as "open secrets", at a time when both purported culprits were heavily involved in FIDE politics.

== Simultaneous games ==
A player with no knowledge of chess can achieve a 50% score in simultaneous chess by replicating the moves made by one of his white opponents in a match against a black opponent, and vice versa; the opponents in effect play each other rather than the giver of the simul. This may be considered cheating in some events such as Basque chess. This can be used against any even number of opponents. Stage magician Derren Brown used the trick against eight leading British chess players in his television show. In most simultaneous exhibitions, the player giving the exhibition always plays the same color (by convention white) in all matches, rendering this trick ineffective; even with a mixed group, attempting to use this in an in-person circle is rather obvious due to more delayed moves than usual, as the player must always look at a given board, not make a move immediately, mirror the move seen on the opposite board, wait for the reply, then send the reply back to the original board.

== See also ==
- Cheating in sports
- Doping in chess
