= List of International Olympic Committee competitions =

List of competitions organized or sanctioned by the International Olympic Committee

This is a list of competitions organized, sanctioned, or directly overseen by the International Olympic Committee (IOC).

The IOC is responsible for the organization of the Olympic Games, Youth Olympic Games, and several newer events connected with the Olympic Movement.

== Active competitions ==
Competition	Established	Frequency	Description
Olympic Games (since 1896)
Summer Olympic Games	1896	Every four years	The main international multi-sport event held for summer Olympic sports.
Winter Olympic Games	1924	Every four years	The main international multi-sport event held for winter Olympic sports.
Youth Olympic Games (since 2010)
Summer Youth Olympic Games	2010	Every four years	A youth version of the Summer Olympics for athletes aged 14 to 18.
Winter Youth Olympic Games	2012	Every four years	A youth version of the Winter Olympics for athletes aged 14 to 18.
Esports competitions (since 2021)
Olympic Virtual Series	2021	One-time	The first IOC-licensed virtual sports competition series, held before the 2020 Summer Olympics.
Olympic Esports Series	2023	One-time	A virtual and simulated sports competition created by the IOC in cooperation with international federations and game publishers.
Olympic Esports Games	2027	Suspended	A planned international esports event organized by the IOC. The IOC will develop a new approach to the Olympic Esports Games, taking the feedback from the "Pause and Reflect" process, and pursue a new partnership model.

== Former competitions ==
Competition	Years	Description
Intercalated Games	1906	A special edition of the Olympic Games held in Athens, later no longer officially recognized by the IOC as part of the formal Olympic chronology.

== See also ==
- Olympic Games
- Olympic Movement
- International Olympic Committee
- List of multi-sport events
- Youth Olympic Games
- Olympic Esports Games
