= Chess at the Olympic Games =

There have been attempts to include chess as a sport at the Olympic Games since 1924. The game made its debut as an exhibition sport at the 2000 Summer Olympics. Online chess debuted as an esport via Chess.com at the 2023 Olympic Esports Week. Chess has yet to debut as a full sport at the Olympics.

== History ==
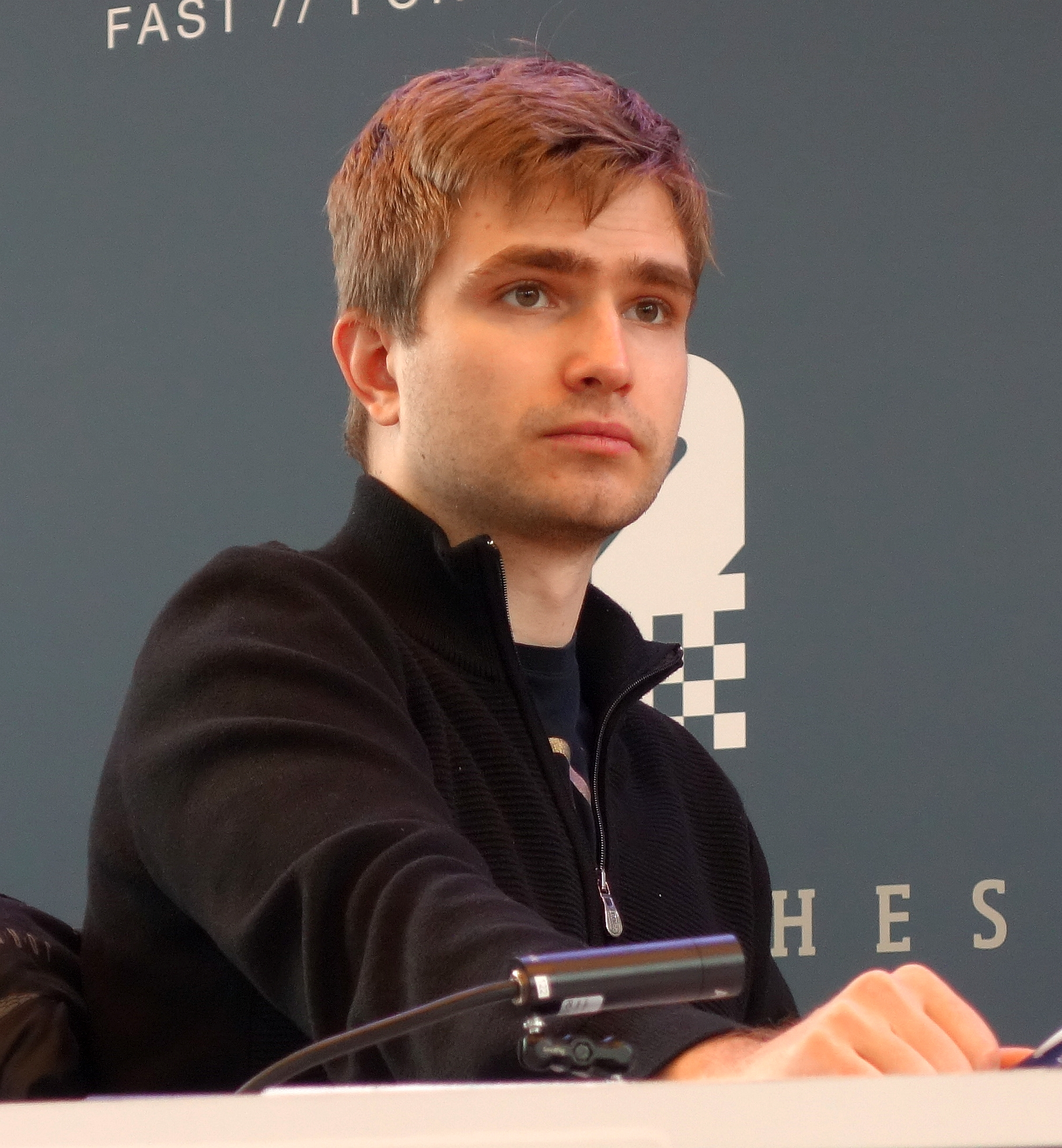
Grandmaster Alexey Sarana won gold for Serbia in a Chess.com competition at the 2023 Olympic Esports Week.

The first known attempt to include chess in the Olympic Games were made by the French Chess Federation (FFE) in 1924. While the organisers of the Summer Olympics defined chess as a sport, steps to include chess in the 1924 Summer Olympics in Paris failed due to "inflexible regulations". At the time, only amateur athletes were allowed to participate in the Olympics; however, the absence of an international chess federation led to complications in distinguishing between amateur and professional players.

While chess was excluded from the 1924 Olympics, the FFE still organized a parallel event, the 1st unofficial Chess Olympiad, known unofficially as the "Chess Olympic Games", consisting of the World Amateur Championship. The International Chess Federation (FIDE) was founded during this event. Among its stated goals were the admission of chess to the 1928 Summer Olympics and the definition of amateurism. The second World Amateur Championship was held alongside the 2nd Chess Olympiad, coinciding with the 1928 Olympics; however, it was decided here to not discriminate between amateur and professional players, and Chess Olympiads since 1927 have been team events open to amateurs and professionals. A bid for chess to feature at the 1940 Summer Olympics in Tokyo was rejected by the International Olympic Committee (IOC) before the Games were cancelled due to the outbreak of World War II.

FIDE was recognized by the IOC in 1999, and chess officials have since lobbied for the game to be featured at the Olympics. After 1999, FIDE began implementing mandatory doping tests at competitions because the IOC requires all members to be World Anti-Doping Agency (WADA) signatories. Chess debuted as an exhibition sport at the 2000 Summer Olympics in Sydney. The IOC supervised two games between Viswanathan Anand of India and Alexei Shirov of Spain, which took place in the Sydney Olympic Village. The two matches were held in a fast chess format on 24 September 2000, and both ended in draws. In 2015, FIDE president Kirsan Ilyumzhinov suggested the possibility of chess using pieces made of ice in order to feature at the Winter Olympic Games.

At the 2023 Olympic Esports Week, an online chess competition was held via Chess.com. The event featured nine grandmasters and one International Master: Alexey Sarana, Maksim Chigaev, Nguyễn Ngọc Trường Sơn, Aleksandr Rakhmanov, Oleksandr Bortnyk, Samvel Ter-Sahakyan, Bassem Amin, Tin Jingyao, Kevin Goh, and Irene Kharisma Sukandar. Alexey Sarana won gold for Serbia while Maksim Chigaev and Nguyễn Ngọc Trường Sơn won silver and bronze for the Individual Neutral Athletes and for Vietnam, respectively. Arkady Dvorkovich, the previous FIDE president, stated that he hopes for chess to be featured as an exhibition sport at the 2028 Summer Olympics in Los Angeles.

== See also ==
- Chess at the Asian Games
- Chess at the African Games
- Chess at the Summer World University Games
