= Chess at the 2000 Summer Olympics =

- Olympic Village, Sydney, Australia
- 24 September 2000
	(Spain) Alexei Shirov	(India) Viswanathan Anand
	1	Scores	1
Game 1	½	? move draw	½
Game 2	½	? move draw	½
	Born 4 July 1972; 28	Born 11 December 1969; 30
	(World No. 3)	(World No. 8)

The Olympic Village Athletes' Chess Exhibition was an exhibition chess event held at the 2000 Summer Olympics in Sydney. The International Olympic Committee (IOC) supervised two matches between Viswanathan Anand of India and Alexei Shirov of Spain, which took place in the Sydney Olympic Village. Matches were held in a fast chess format, with each player having 30 minutes total playing time. Both games held on 24 September 2000 ended in draws.

The International Chess Federation was recognized by the IOC in 1999. Chess has not featured at any Olympic Games before or since 2000, though it was included in the 2023 Olympic Esports Week run by the IOC.

== See also ==
- Chess at the Olympic Games
