= Alexandru Crișan =

Romanian chess player (born 1962)

Personal information
- Born: July 31, 1962 (age 64) Șimleu Silvaniei, Romania

Chess career
- Country: Romania
- Peak rating: 2635 (January 1998)
- Peak ranking: No. 50 (April 2001)

Alexandru Crișan is a Romanian former chess player.

== Career ==
He was awarded the International Master title in 1991, and the Grandmaster title in 1993.

=== Controversy ===
Suspicions of Crișan's achievements being illegitimate arose when it was found that he had a rating of 2635 without playing any notable games against the top 10 Romanian players, participating in the top group of the Romanian National Championship, participating in any Chess Olympiads, or having any results from official tournaments. Zurab Azmaiparashvili (who was himself later found to have rigged tournament results in his favor) examined some of Crișan's games, and claimed that his rating was impossible given his manner of play.

It was found that Crișan had faked tournament reports to gain the Grandmaster title. In September 2001, FIDE Congress recommended for his titles to be revoked, though this was not immediately done. In August 2015, all of his titles were revoked in FIDE's official rating lists. As such, his rating was adjusted downwards to 2132, with the rating deduction being applied retroactively from October 2001 onwards.

Crișan, along with Gaioz Nigalidze, Isa Kasimi (formerly Igors Rausis), and Kirill Shevchenko are the only people who have had their Grandmaster titles revoked.

== See also ==
- Cheating in chess
