= Doping in chess =

Use of performance-enhancing drugs in chess

Doping in chess involves the use of performance-enhancing substances in the game of chess, especially in a professional competitive context. Whether such drugs can actually be used to enhance performance in chess had been the subject of considerable debate and controversy until it was proven in a 2017 study. Drug tests are carried out in major International Chess Federation (FIDE) competitions such as the Chess Olympiads and World Chess Championships.

== History ==
FIDE began implementing anti-doping tests at international competitions in the early 2000s in order to adhere to International Olympic Committee (IOC) and World Anti-Doping Agency (WADA) regulations. This was part of FIDE's campaign for the inclusion of chess at the Olympic Games. The first drug test at a FIDE chess event was in 2001, and WADA categorized chess as a "low risk sport".

FIDE's drug test policy was met with significant criticism and protest. At the time, it was widely believed to be impossible to dope in chess. In 2002, Artur Yusopov and Robert Hübner both declined to participate in the 35th Chess Olympiad due to doping regulations, with Yusopov comparing the implementation of drug testing to the policies of Stalinism. Vasyl Ivanchuk refused to undergo a doping test at the 38th Chess Olympiad in 2008, resulting in him being banned from FIDE competitions for two years. His ban was ended early in 2009 when FIDE exonerated him of wrongdoing. Chess organizer Michael Atkins called the Ivanchuk situation "bureaucracy gone haywire", arguing that there was no evidence of drugs having any effects on chess performance. In 2014, chess grandmaster Gregory Serper wrote an article stating that "No one has ever been able to prove that a mythical chess-enhancing drug even exists".

Beta blockers have been discussed as a potential pharmacological enhancer in chess because they reduce heart rate and anxiety by blocking adrenaline. It was shown that lower-rated and sub-elite players tend to make more simple mistakes in anxiety-inducing situations due to increases in adrenaline. In high-pressure situations, players also experience hyperventilation, high pulse rate and high blood pressure. However, since a player cannot predict exactly when these symptoms will occur, a reliable performance-enhancing dose may not be possible. Grandmaster and medical doctor Helmut Pfleger tested the effects of beta blockers on himself in a game against Boris Spassky in 1979 and performed poorly. He stated that his game collapsed when his blood pressure dropped, and concluded that "both mentally stimulating and mentally calming medication have too many negative effects".

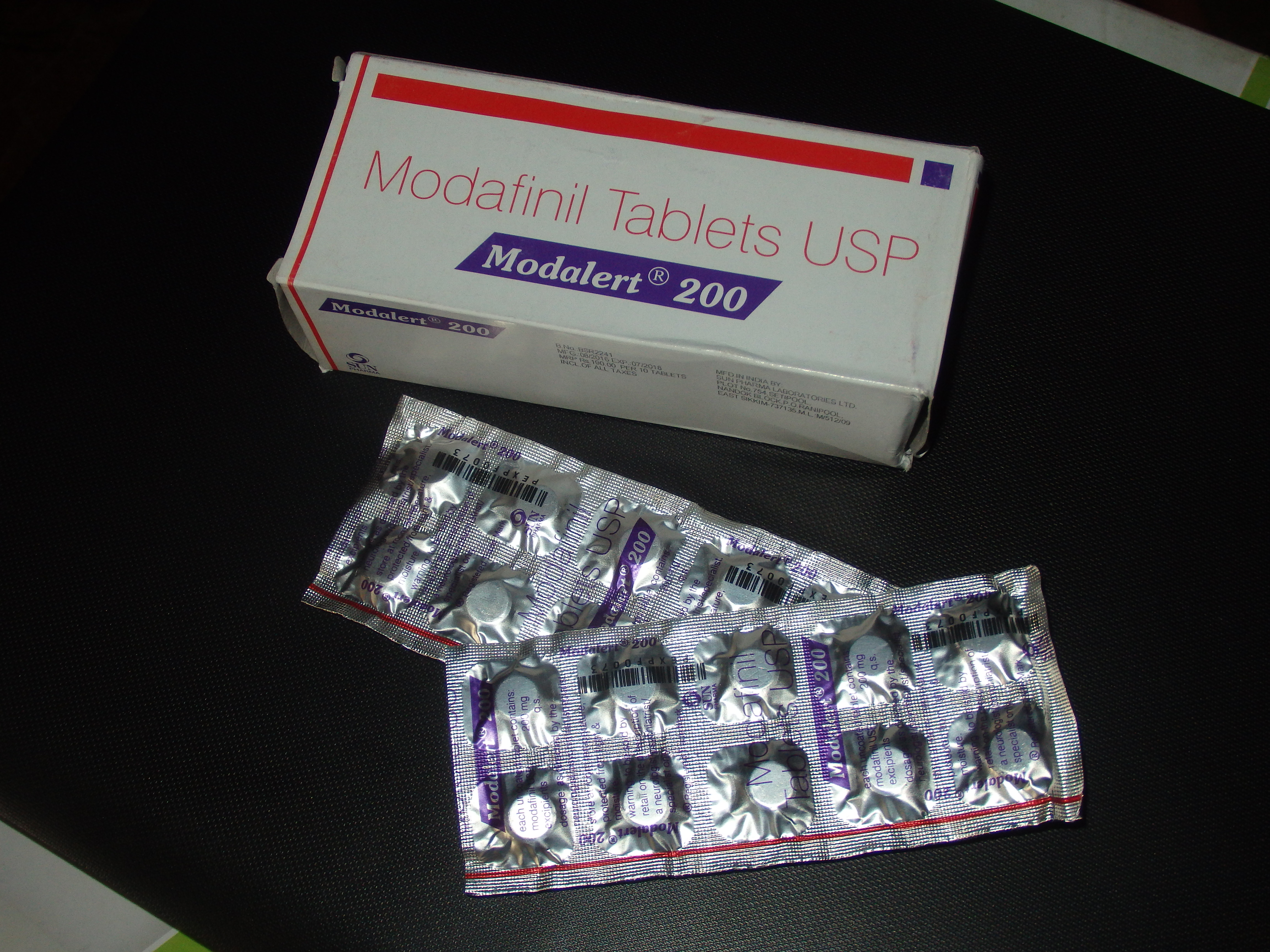
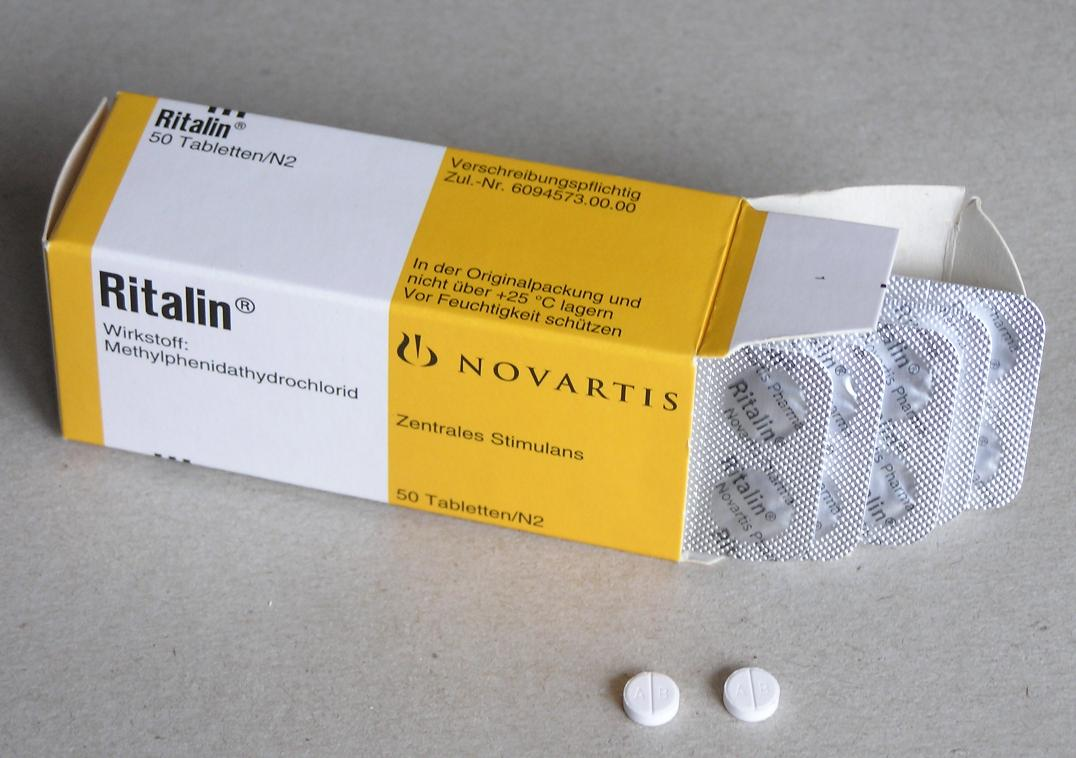
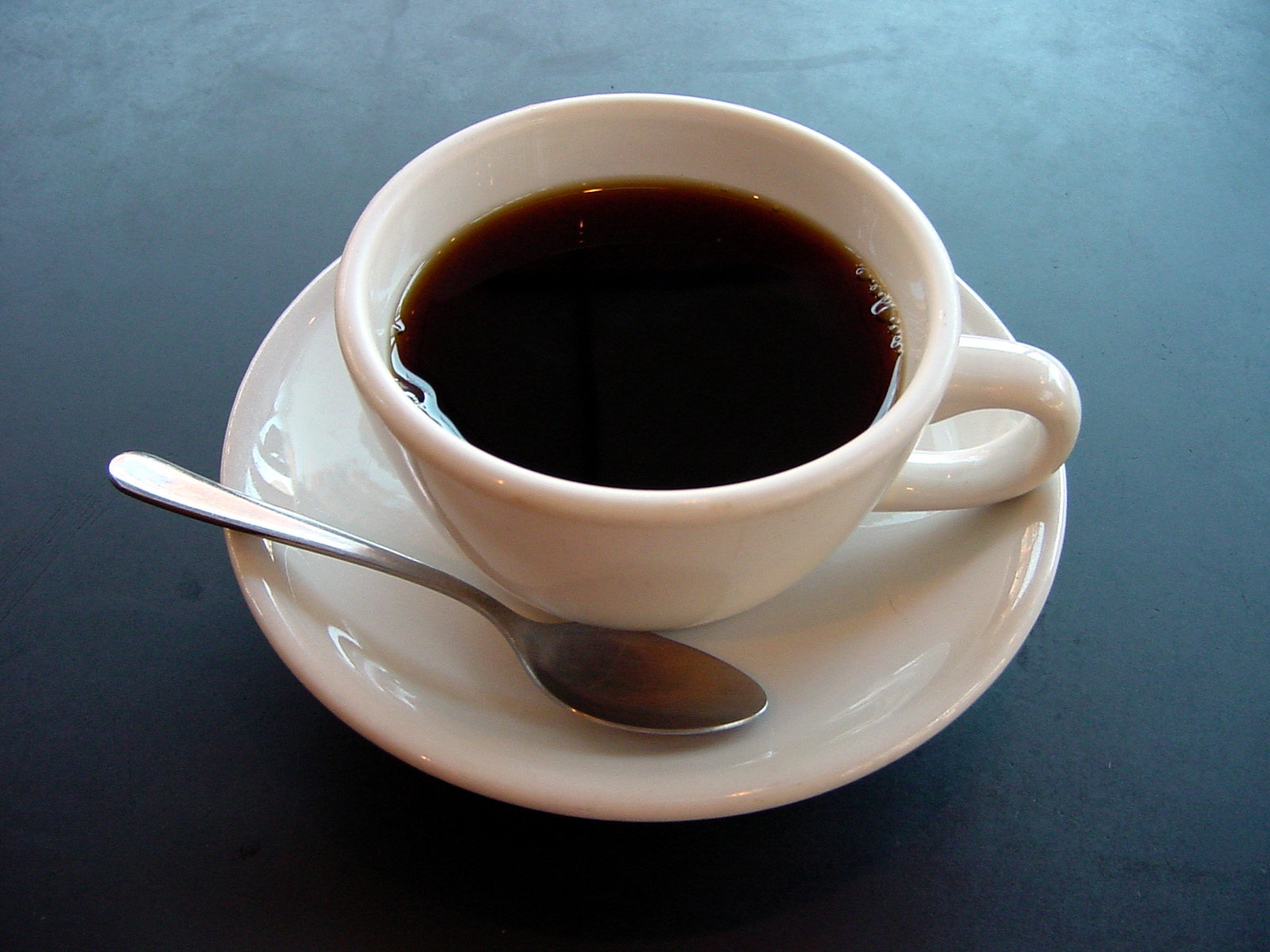
Modafinil, methylphenidate (Ritalin), and caffeine have all been shown to improve chess performance.

In 2017, a study published in European Neuropsychopharmacology, the official publication of the European College of Neuropsychopharmacology, showed for the first time that cognitive-enhancement drugs can improve performance in chess. The study analyzed more than 3,000 games played by 40 players. The study found that modafinil improved chess performance by about 15% compared to placebo, methylphenidate improved performance by about 13%, and caffeine improved performance by about 9%. While the drugs were found to improve performance, they were also observed to make players play more slowly, suggesting that they improved the ability of players to make calculated decisions. A 2025 study published in the journal Performance Enhancement & Health surveyed 1,924 German chess players and found an estimated 12-month prevalence of 5.1% for doping in both over-the-board chess and online chess.

FIDE incorporates the Prohibited List published by WADA. According to FIDE, the most relevant banned substances are amphetamines (such as Adderall and Ritalin), Ephedrine and Methylephedrine (prohibited when concentration in urine is greater than 10 mcg/mL), Pseudoephedrine (prohibited when concentration in urine is greater than 150 mcg/mL), and Modafinil.

== See also ==
- Caffeine use for sport
- Cheating in chess
- Doping in sport
