= Arnaud Hauchard =

French chess grandmaster (born 1971)

Personal information
- Born: 15 November 1971 (age 54)

Chess career
- Country: France
- Title: Grandmaster (2000)
- FIDE rating: 2474 (July 2026)
- Peak rating: 2554 (November 2016)

Arnaud Hauchard (born 15 November 1971) is a French chess grandmaster (2000).

Played for France in the European Team Chess Championships of 1992 and 1997 and in the Chess Olympiads of 1998 and 2000. In 2000 he tied for 2nd–10th with Vadim Zvjaginsev, Sergey Dolmatov, Alexander Motylev, Alexander Grischuk, Maxim Turov, Nukhim Rashkovsky, Jiří Štoček and Valeri Yandemirov in the Úbeda Open tournament.

On the May 2010 FIDE lists his Elo rating as 2526.

In March 2011 he was suspended for cheating. This suspension was later revoked by a French civil court when it was discovered that Mr. Hauchard received communications from the FIDE Ethics Committee only in English and not in French, his native language, nor was he given the free assistance of an interpreter. This qualified as a violation of article 6.3 of the European Convention on Human Rights (ECHR). In July 2012 the FIDE Ethic Commission sanctioned the involved players and ruled "Mr. Arnaud HAUCHARD has to be sanctioned with the exclusion from the participation in all FIDE tournaments, as a player or as a member of a national delegation, for a period of 3 (three) years, starting from the 1st of August 2012".
