= Caffeine use for sport =

Caffeine as a legal performance enhancer in sport

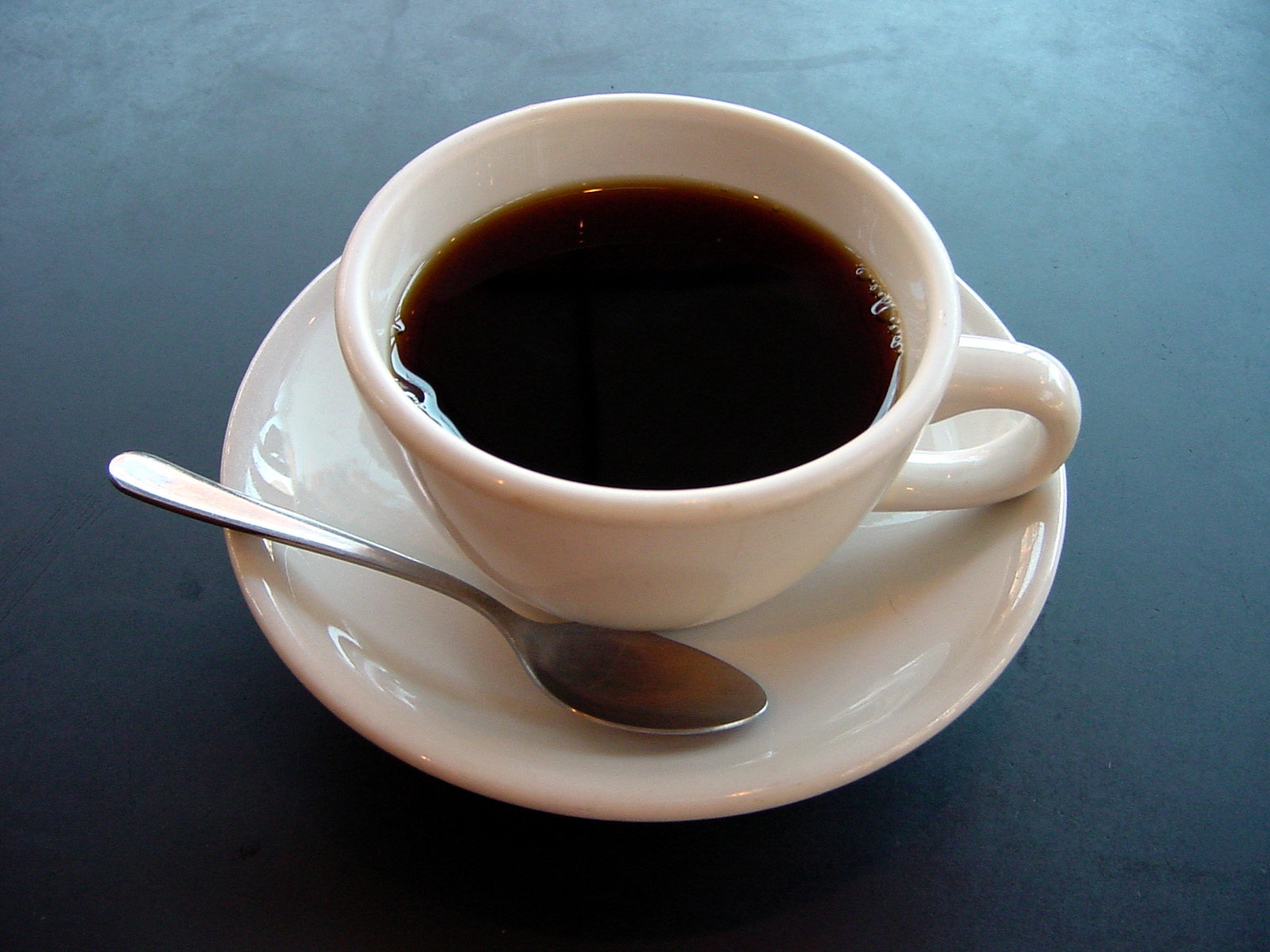
Coffee is a source of caffeine.

Caffeine use for sport is a worldwide known and tested idea. Many athletes use caffeine as a legal performance enhancer, as the benefits it provides, both physically and cognitively, outweigh the disadvantages. The benefits caffeine provides influences the performance of both endurance athletes and anaerobic athletes. Caffeine has been proven to be effective in enhancing performance.

Caffeine is a stimulant drug. Once consumed, it is absorbed in the stomach and small intestine as well as being circulated throughout the body. It targets muscles and organs, in particular the brain. Caffeine is most commonly known for being in coffee. It is also found in tea, chocolate, soft drinks, energy drinks, and medications.

The short-term effects from caffeine are usually noticed after 5–30 minutes and long-term effects last for up to 12 hours. Those who use caffeine regularly, most often drinking at least one coffee a day, can become dependent and addicted. If caffeine use is stopped, they may experience withdrawal symptoms such as tiredness and headaches.

== Regulation ==
Until January 2004, caffeine was on the banned list of drugs published by WADA.

== Effects of caffeine ==
The chemical structure of a caffeine molecule

Caffeine acts on both the respiratory and cardiovascular systems. The cardiovascular system is the pathway the human body uses for circulating blood, supplying oxygen and removing waste products. The respiratory system is the system involved with the exchange of oxygen and carbon dioxide between the atmosphere and the blood. As caffeine targets the brain, there are many cognitive effects from using it. Caffeine can reduce tiredness and improve reaction time.

Caffeine is a mild diuretic, which can lead to dehydration. Other physical disadvantages include impaired fine motor control, gastrointestinal upset, increased heart rate, and sleep disruptions. Caffeine can cause feelings of anxiety and insomnia. Studies have found that sleep deprivation has a significant effect on sub-maximal, prolonged exercise. Caffeine also elevates stress hormone levels and one's perception of stress.

== Effectiveness ==
Studies have found that typical doses of caffeine from 1–3 mg per kg of body weight will provide an effective improvement to performance. There is preliminary evidence that shows caffeine is effective for endurance and anaerobic activities. In studies of trained males, the discovery of the optimal amount of caffeine for anaerobic exercise was determined. A caffeine dosage of 3–5 mg/kg may improve high-intensity sprint performance when consumed prior to exercise.

One analysis showed that there were small improvements, in which they discussed for these activities correlate to meaningful differences in performance. The following conclusions were drawn:

- Caffeine ingested resulted in an increase in upper body strength but not lower body strength.
- For strength exercises, there was no significant differences between trained and untrained subjects
- Caffeine in capsule form had a greater influence on performance rather than liquid form; gums and gels were not tested.
- Using a vertical jump as an indicator of muscle power, results showed a significant increase in power, supporting caffeine as a possible ergogenic aid.

In 2017, a study published in European Neuropsychopharmacology, the official publication of the European College of Neuropsychopharmacology, showed for the first time that cognitive-enhancement drugs can improve performance in chess. The study analyzed more than 3,000 games played by 40 players and found that caffeine improved chess performance by about 9% compared to placebo.

== See also ==
- Bodybuilding supplement
- Doping in chess
- Doping in sport
