= Zurab Azmaiparashvili =

Georgian chess grandmaster (born 1960)

Zurab Azmaiparashvili ზურაბ აზმაიფარაშვილი
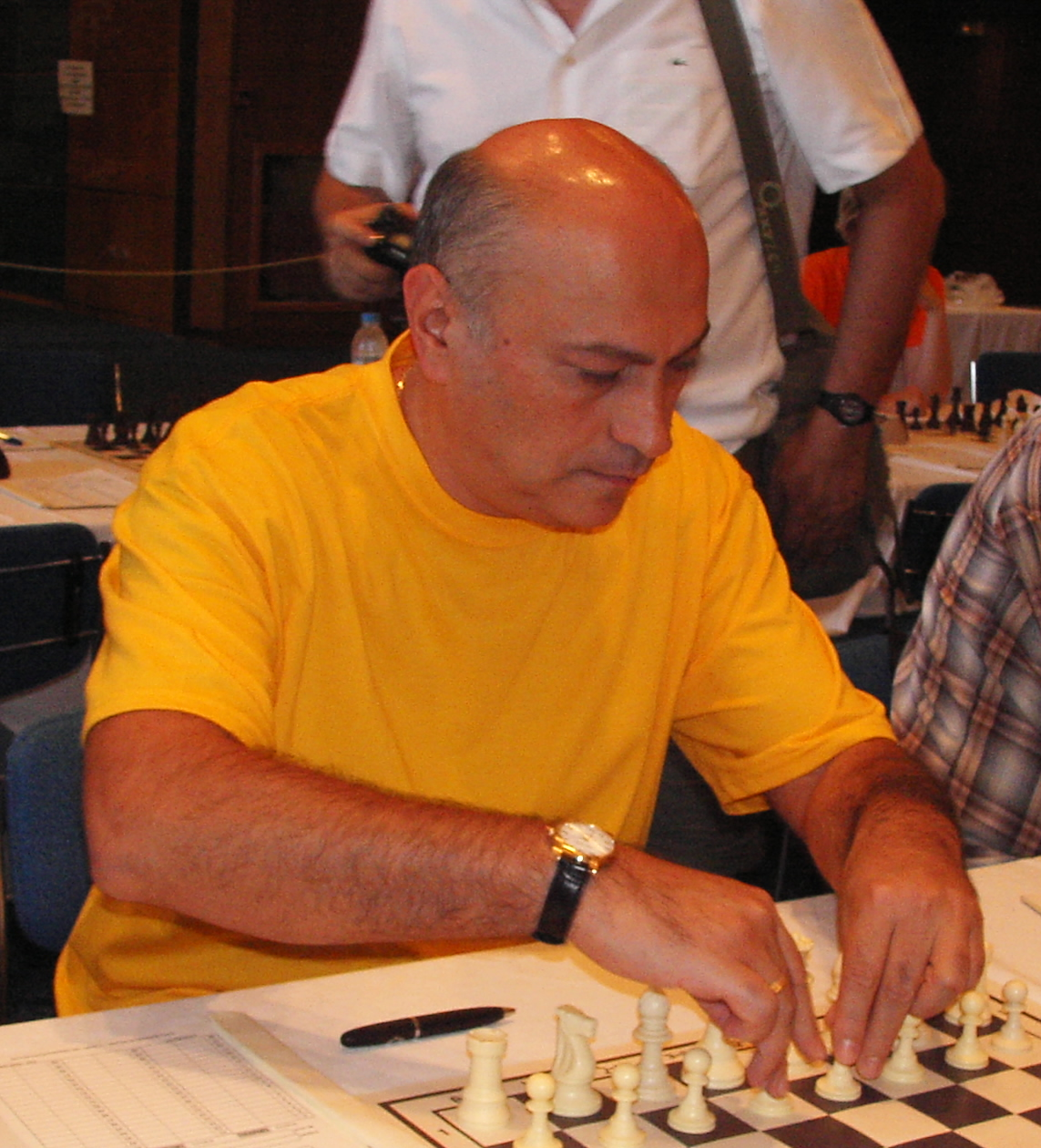
- Zurab Azmaiparashvili, 2007

Personal information
- Born: 16 March 1960 (age 66) Tbilisi, Georgian SSR, Soviet Union

Chess career
- Country: Soviet Union (until 1991); Georgia (1992–1994; since 1997); Bosnia and Herzegovina (1995–1996)
- Title: Grandmaster (1988)
- FIDE rating: 2637 (September 2026)
- Peak rating: 2702 (July 2003)
- Peak ranking: No. 11 (January 1993)

Zurab Azmaiparashvili (Georgian: ზურაბ აზმაიფარაშვილი; born 16 March 1960) is a Georgian chess grandmaster. His peak Elo rating was 2702, achieved in July 2003. He is currently, as of 2024, the president of the European Chess Union.

== Career ==
Azmaiparashvili became a Grandmaster in 1988. Among his achievements are a 2810 performance rating at the 1998 Chess Olympiad and first-place finishes at Pavlodar 1982, Moscow 1986, Albena 1986, Tbilisi 1986, London (Lloyds Bank Open) 1989, and in the 2003 European Individual Chess Championship in Silivri. In 2010 he tied for 1st–2nd with IM Oliver Barbosa in the 1st ASEAN Chess Championship in Singapore, and won the event on tie-break.

Azmaiparashvili is active in chess politics. He is President of the European Chess Union and a vice-president of international chess federation FIDE.

In August 2009, he was appointed as captain of Azerbaijani chess team and won European Team Chess Championship in Novi Sad (Serbia).

== Controversies ==
Azmaiparashvili was alleged to have rigged the results of the Strumica tournament of 1995 to boost his rating. The tournament, in which he played 18 rounds against significantly weaker opponents, is generally regarded as an illegitimate event. In 2003, Sveshnikov referred to the Azmaiparashvili incident and similar case involving Alexandru Crișan as "open secrets", at a time when both purported culprits were heavily involved in FIDE politics.

In winning the 2003 European Championship in Istanbul, Azmaiparashvili retracted a move against Vladimir Malakhov (who subsequently finished second). By retracting his blunder and playing a sensible move, Azmaiparashvili won the game and the tournament. Malakhov could have enforced the rules but said that he was too shocked to react.

Both grandmasters were fighting for the lead, and the encounter had huge sporting significance. In an ending that was favourable to him, Azmai[parashvili] picked up the bishop, intending to make a move with it instead of first exchanging rooks. Malakhov recalled: "Seeing that the rooks were still on the board, he said something like, 'Oh, first the exchange, of course.' put his bishop back, took my rook, and the game continued. I don't know what should have been done differently in this situation—in Azmai's place, some might have resigned immediately, and in my place, some would have demanded that he make a move with his bishop but I didn't want to ruin the logical development of the duel, so I didn't object when Azmai made a different move: the mistake was obviously nothing to do with chess! When we signed the score sheets, Azmai suggested to me that we consider the game a draw. After the game I was left with an unpleasant aftertaste, but that was due mainly to my own play."

Azmaiparashvili made chess news in 2004 when, at the closing ceremony of the 36th Chess Olympiad in Calvià, he was arrested by local police and subsequently held in custody for several days. The attitude of the event's organizers towards Azmaiparashvili had apparently been soured when, upon his arrival in Spain, he had attempted to secure himself two hotel rooms, claiming he was entitled to one in his capacity as a FIDE vice-president, and another as a player at the event. This sour mood seems to have brought him extra attention at the closing ceremony when he approached the stage, apparently in an attempt to inform FIDE officials that the organizers had neglected to award a prize named in honour of Georgian former Women's World Champion Nona Gaprindashvili. He came into conflict with security officials, and a scuffle broke out resulting in injuries both to Azmaiparashvili and a security agent. There are conflicting claims about the exact nature of said scuffle: a press release from the Olympiad organizers placed the blame squarely on Azmaiparashvili's shoulders, saying that after he had tried to gain admittance to the stage on several occasions he "without any previous provocation, assaulted the agent with a head butt to his mouth". FIDE, on the other hand, blamed over-zealous policing, saying in their press release that "Despite his clear VIP identification, he was severely beaten up by several security guards". Azmaiparashvili was due to appear in court on 22 July 2005, but all charges were dropped shortly beforehand.

Azmaiparashvili had been criticized earlier in 2004 over arrangements for the 2004 Women's World Chess Championship when female Georgian players Lela Javakhishvili and Ana Matnadze accused him of behaving "in a hostile and intimidating manner, using inappropriate and vulgar language and bringing to tears our mothers".

At the Chess World Cup 2017, where Azmaiparashvili was organizer, he berated player Anton Kovalyov for wearing shorts, racially abusing him with the slur "gypsy" and demanding that Kovalyov change ten minutes before his scheduled third-round game, leading to Kovalyov withdrawing from the tournament in response. Azmaiparashvili received heavy backlash from the global chess community for this incident, including a condemnation from the Association of Chess Professionals and calls from other players demanding that he be removed from his organization roles. In an interview with Chessbase India, Azmaiparashvili stood by his decision.
