= Olympic Esports Games =

International multi-esport event

Tournament information
- Established: 2027 (planned)
- Administrator: International Olympic Committee
- Format: LAN

Most recent tournament
- 2027 Olympic Esports Games

Olympic Esports Games is a planned international multi-esport event. It will feature multiple different virtual sports and video games coming together in a single location, run by the International Olympic Committee. The events at the Olympic Esports Games have a connection with traditional Olympic sports, as the video game titles selected are chosen by international federations.

While esports and competitive video gaming have traditionally not been considered a sport, the Olympic Movement began taking an interest as early as 2007, when esports were included at the 2007 Asian Indoor Games programme. In 2017, during the 6th Olympic Summit in Lausanne, the leading representatives of the Olympic Movement discussed about the rapid development of esports, agreeing that "competitive 'eSports' could be considered as a sporting activity", but "in order to be recognised by the IOC as a sport, the content of 'eSports' must not infringe on the Olympic values".

After an online-only Olympic Virtual Series was held during the COVID-19 pandemic in 2021, featuring five esports across ten events, the IOC eventually announced the creation of the Olympic Esports Series, as part of the Olympic Esports Week, in November 2022. The inaugural edition was held in Singapore in June 2023.

On 11 February 2025, the IOC announced the first Olympic Esports Games were set to be held in Riyadh, Saudi Arabia in 2027. However, on 30 October 2025, the IOC announced they would organize the Olympic Esports Games on their own after talks broke down with the Saudi Arabian Olympic Committee and the Esports World Cup Foundation, who initially partnered for the Games organization. It is currently unknown if the inaugural Esports Games will still be held as scheduled. As of May 2026, the Esports Commission has been disbanded and planning for the Games has been paused.

== History ==
Traditional esports titles such as Counter-Strike, Dota, League of Legends, and Valorant have been considered to be "too violent" for inclusion in an Olympic-style esports competition. An Olympic Summit was held in October 2017 to consider the possible adoption of esports by the Olympic Movement, with a further IOC Esports Forum held in July 2018. However, the lack of a single international federation to govern esports, a requirement for a sport to be recognised as an Olympic sport, along with the issue of violence in games, meant the IOC would not consider adding esports to the Olympic Games.

Other sporting events, such as the Asian Games held by the Olympic Council of Asia and the Southeast Asian Games, recognise esports as a medal event. It was first added to a major Games at the 2007 Asian Indoor Games, and became a full medal event of the Asian Games starting with the 2022 Asian Games, and the Southeast Asian Games starting with the 2019 SEA Games.

After the COVID-19 pandemic led to the postponement of the 2020 Summer Olympics to 2021, the inaugural IOC-backed esports event, known as the Olympic Virtual Series, was announced for 2021. Sports included in that were baseball, cycling, motorsport, rowing, and sailing – four of which would return as part of the Olympic Esports Series in 2023.

A second Olympic Virtual Series was planned for 2022, but did not take place, instead being replaced by the Olympic Esports Series.

Following the conclusion of the inaugural event in Singapore, the IOC's head of virtual sports and esports Vincent Pereira said that Paris, as the host city of the 2024 Summer Olympics, had priority to host an edition of the Olympic Esports Series in 2024 if it wished, but that interest had also been received from Singapore to repeat as hosts as well as from Seoul, South Korea; Abu Dhabi in the United Arab Emirates; New York City; and Shenzhen, China. Studies suggest that tailoring Olympic Esports events to align with regional values of excellence, friendship, and respect could increase global acceptance and support.

Despite criticism over excluding traditional esports titles deemed "too violent", the IOC also intends to keep first-person shooter games out of the Olympic Esports Series in the future, according to Pereira. Despite Fortnite having been included in the 2023 event in a specially modified format with targets, Pereira added the default format of Fortnite involving shooting other characters would not be considered.

Future game additions could include Rocket League, the Street Fighter series, and the NBA 2K series, which all featured as exhibition events in 2023.

This digital entertainment event can have a significant positive impact on competitive gaming globally, with the industry’s value expected to reach over $1 trillion by 2032, growing at a compound annual growth rate of 11.60 percent during the forecast period 2023-2032, according to market research firm Inkwood Research.

In June 2024, the IOC Executive Board announced that it would create an Olympic Esports Games, with the 142nd IOC Session held during the 2024 Summer Olympics due to vote on the proposal. In July 2024, it was announced that the inaugural Olympic Esports Games would be held in Saudi Arabia, following a new partnership with the Saudi Arabian Olympic Committee. The proposal was ultimately approved by a unanimous vote on 23 July 2024. International sporting events such as the Asian Games, as already mentioned, had already established esports competitions.

On 11 February 2025, the IOC announced that the inaugural Olympic Esports Games were to be held in 2027 instead of 2025, still planned to be held in Riyadh. On 30 October, they announced that they would end the partnership with the Saudi Arabian Olympic Committee on mutual terms after talks involving them and the Esports World Cup Foundation (EWCF), the Saudi-based organization that runs the Esports Nations Cup, a national team-focused competition announced earlier in 2025 and planned to be first held in November 2026, as well as the namesake Esports World Cup (for individual esports clubs such as T1 and Virtus.pro). The IOC would instead pursue a different approach and new partnership model for the Olympic Esports Games that would be separate from that of the EWCF's competitions. It is currently unknown if the inaugural Games will still be held in 2027, although Singapore and South Korea have been pointed as potential host countries to replace Saudi Arabia.

== Host city requirements ==
The scale of the Olympic Esports Games is smaller than that of the Olympics. Potential host cities are required to keep all events within the same city and no new venues should be built. No new or unique transportation systems are required, as all athletes and coaches will be transported by local shuttles.

== Participation ==
After the conclusion of the first Esports Week, the lack of participation from African players was criticised, with an opinion piece in Kenya's Daily Nation questioning the decision of the IOC to use online qualifiers for the Olympic Esports Series, due to connectivity and stability issues in Africa which make staying connected to servers a "logistical challenge".

== See also ==
- Olympic Esports Series
- FIFAe World Cup
- Esports at the Asian Games
- Esports Nations Cup
