= Online firestorm =

Wave of hostile social media posts aimed at a target

An online firestorm is a rapid surge of negative word-of-mouth and public complaints directed at a person, company, brand, politician, or institution through social media platforms. Firestorms typically develop within hours and fade within a day, and have played out primarily on fast-turnover platforms including Twitter (now X), Facebook, and Weibo. Mainstream press coverage amplifies firestorms with traditional reporting driving further online activity. They can damage reputations, prompt customer or audience defections, and have contributed to the resignation of public figures.

The term was introduced in 2014 in marketing communications literature by Pfeffer, Zorbach, and Carley, an interdisciplinary team spanning computer science and marketing. Firestorms occur in commercial brand communities, where they target businesses, and in social and political settings, where they target public figures, institutions, policies, or perceived violations of social norms.

== Related concepts ==
As a form of mass verbal venting, online firestorms consist of aggressive comments directed at a shared target that escalate as other users add similar comments. In the marketing literature, the individual posts can also be referred to as negative electronic word of mouth (eWOM). Firestorms are related to other forms of aggressive online commenting such as flaming, cyberbullying, and hostility in online discussion forums. The term is also used in mainstream press to describe viral social media controversies.

== Well-documented examples ==
- Karl-Theodor zu Guttenberg plagiarism affair (2011): online debate over allegations of plagiarism in the doctoral dissertation of the then German federal minister of defence, which led to the revocation of his PhD and his resignation.
- Christian Wulff corruption allegations (2011 to 2012): social media amplification of corruption accusations against the then German federal president, contributing to his resignation; the underlying allegations were later rejected as unfounded.
- McDonald's #McDStories campaign (2012): a Twitter hashtag promoting McDonald's was hijacked within hours by users posting negative experiences and complaints; the company stopped promoting #McDStories two hours after launching it.
- #deleteUber (2017): a Twitter campaign protesting Uber's perceived response to a taxi strike during demonstrations at United States airports, leading to widespread account deletions.
- United Airlines passenger removal (2017): the forcible removal of a passenger from an overbooked flight, captured on video by other passengers and circulated globally within hours.

== Effects ==
Consequences for the targets of online firestorms include damage to reputation, loss of customer goodwill, customer defection, and in some cases measurable drops in sales and share price. Evidence on financial impact is mixed, with firms that hold strong prior reputations often recovering quickly. Online firestorms have also contributed to the resignation of public figures, including Karl-Theodor zu Guttenberg and Christian Wulff in Germany in 2011.
