= Gaioz Nigalidze =

Georgian chess player (born 1989)

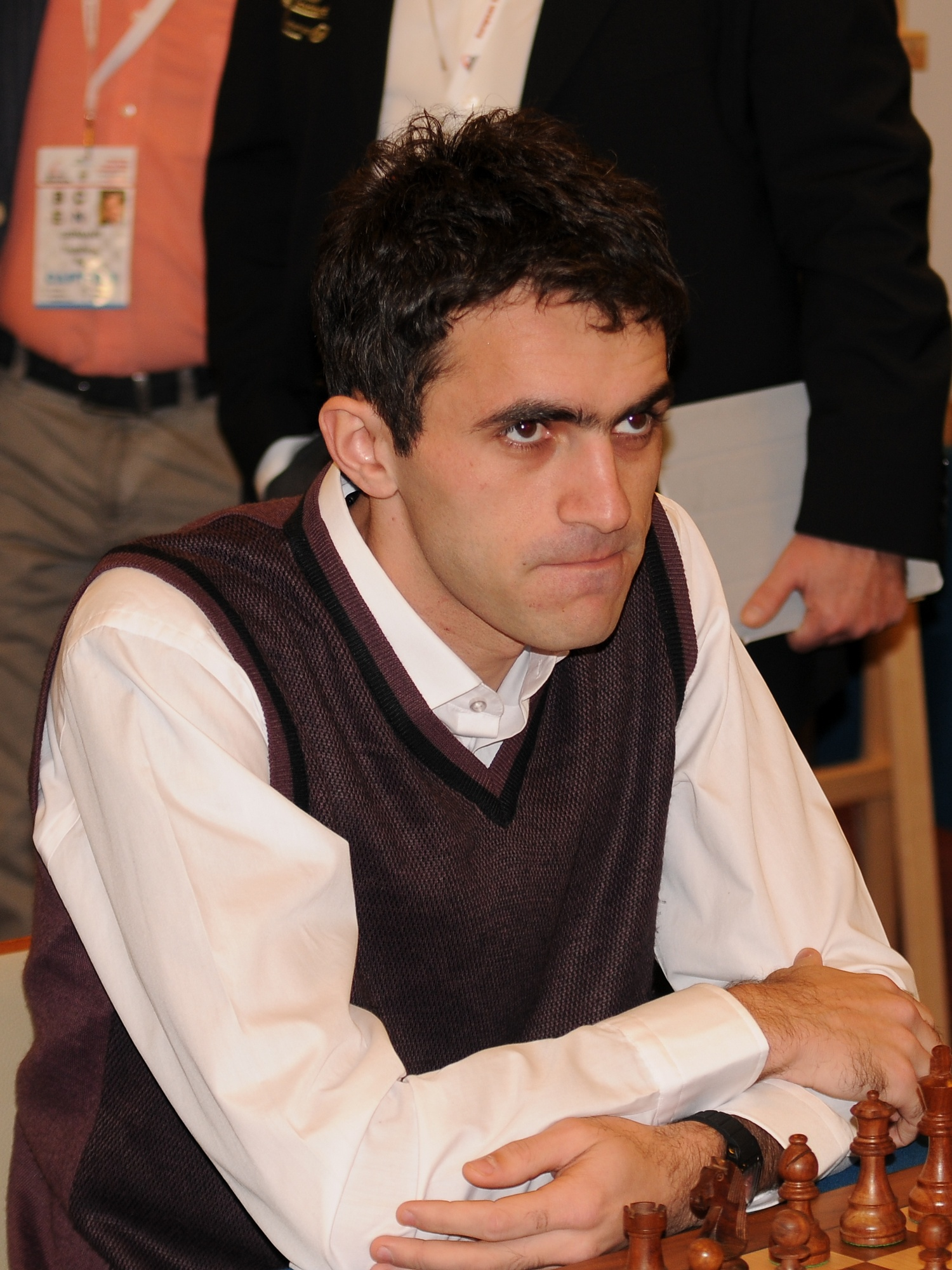
- Nigalidze in 2013

Personal information
- Born: 24 April 1989 (age 37)

Chess career
- Country: Georgia
- Title: Grandmaster (2014, revoked in 2015) International Master (2009)
- Peak rating: 2566 (January 2015)

Gaioz Nigalidze (Georgian: გაიოზ ნიგალიძე; born 24 April 1989) is a Georgian chess player. He was awarded the title International Master by FIDE in 2009. In 2014, he was also awarded the title Grandmaster, but it was revoked in 2015 for cheating using electronic devices that were hidden in a bathroom.

== Career ==
Nigalidze won the Georgian Chess Championship in 2013 and 2014. He played on the Georgian national team at the European Team Chess Championship in 2013 and at the Chess Olympiad in 2014.

== 2015 Dubai Open incident ==
Nigalidze drew attention to himself by cheating at the 2015 Dubai Open. Tigran L. Petrosian, his opponent in the 6th round, complained that Nigalidze had been routinely going to the bathroom during the game in a crucial position. Petrosian had also previously been suspicious of Nigalidze for similar practice when he won in Al Ain in December 2014. He complained to Chief Arbiter Mahdi Abdul Rahim that it was unusual as he was always going to the same stall. After checking the bathroom stall, a smartphone as well as a headset was found hidden behind a pan and beneath some toilet paper.

While Nigalizde originally denied owning the devices, the smart phone was logged into one of his social networking accounts and his current position was displayed on a program. He was expelled from the tournament. The rules of FIDE strictly prohibit players from using electronic devices capable of communication or analysis during a game, with bans of up to 3 years for a first offence and up to 15 years for a repeat offence. He was subsequently banned for 3 years (until September 2018) and his grandmaster title was revoked. His previous tournaments were also investigated.

== See also ==
- Cheating in chess
