= List of players who have appeared in multiple UEFA Women's Championships =

In the UEFA Women's Championship, the following female players have been named in the national team in at least five finals tournaments.

== Tournaments ==
Team	Player (Note: Name in bold indicates a player still active at club level.)	In squad (Note: Number of finals tournaments in which the player was part of the squad.)	Played (Note: Number of finals tournaments in which the player played in at least one match.)	Tournaments (Note: Years in brackets indicate that the player was part of the squad but did not play in any matches.)
Italy	Giorgia Brenzan	7	4	(1984), (1987), (1989), 1991, 1993, 1997, 2001
Germany	Doris Fitschen	6	6	1989, 1991, 1993, 1995, 1997, 2001
Italy	Carolina Morace	6	6	1984, 1987, 1989, 1991, 1993, 1997
Norway	Heidi Støre	6	6	1987, 1989, 1991, 1993, 1995, 1997
Italy	Antonella Carta	6	5	1984, 1987, 1989, 1991, (1993), 1997
Sweden	Kosovare Asllani	5	5	2009, 2013, 2017, 2022, 2025
Italy	Federica D'Astolfo	5	5	1989, 1991, 1993, 1997, 2001
Italy	Feriana Ferraguzzi	5	5	1984, 1987, 1989, 1991, 1993
Norway	Linda Medalen	5	5	1989, 1991, 1993, 1995, 1997
Norway	Maren Mjelde	5	5	2009, 2013, 2017, 2022, 2025
Denmark	Nadia Nadim	5	5	2009, 2013, 2017, 2022, 2025
Italy	Patrizia Panico	5	5	1997, 2001, 2005, 2009, 2013
Denmark	Katrine Pedersen	5	5	1997, 2001, 2005, 2009, 2013
Germany	Birgit Prinz	5	5	1995, 1997, 2001, 2005, 2009
Norway	Hege Riise	5	5	1991, 1993, 1995, 1997, 2001
Sweden	Caroline Seger	5	5	2005, 2009, 2013, 2017, 2022
Netherlands	Sherida Spitse	5	5	2009, 2013, 2017, 2022, 2025
France	Sandrine Soubeyrand	5	5	1997, 2001, 2005, 2009, 2013
Denmark	Katrine Veje	5	5	2009, 2013, 2017, 2022, 2025
Germany	Bettina Wiegmann	5	5	1991, 1993, 1995, 1997, 2001
Norway	Agnete Carlsen	5	4	1989, 1991, 1993, (1995), 1997
Sweden	Hedvig Lindahl	5	4	2005, 2009, (2013), 2017, 2022
Germany	Martina Voss-Tecklenburg	5	4	1989, 1991, (1993), 1995, 1997
Germany	Nadine Angerer	5	2	(1997), (2001), (2005), 2009, 2013

== Matches ==
The following players had caps in at least 16 matches, which requires a minimum of three Championship appearances.

Team	Player (Note: Name in bold indicates a player still active in international football.)	Matches (Note: Number of finals matches the player entered the field, not counting those as an unused substitute.)	Tournaments
Germany	Birgit Prinz	23	1995, 1997, 2001, 2005, 2009
Sweden	**Kosovare Asllani**	22	2009, 2013, 2017, 2022, 2025
Norway	Solveig Gulbrandsen	20	2001, 2005, 2009, 2013
Norway	**Maren Mjelde**	20	2009, 2013, 2017, 2022, 2025
Denmark	**Nadia Nadim**	20	2009, 2013, 2017, 2022, 2025
Italy	Patrizia Panico	19	1997, 2001, 2005, 2009, 2013
Sweden	Caroline Seger	19	2005, 2009, 2013, 2017, 2022
Denmark	**Katrine Veje**	19	2009, 2013, 2017, 2022, 2025
Germany	Doris Fitschen	17	1989, 1991, 1993, 1995, 1997, 2001
Denmark	**Pernille Harder**	17	2013, 2017, 2022, 2025
Germany	Ariane Hingst	17	1997, 2001, 2005, 2009
Sweden	Hedvig Lindahl	17	2005, 2009, 2013, 2017, 2022
Germany	Anja Mittag	17	2005, 2009, 2013, 2017
Spain	**Irene Paredes**	17	2013, 2017, 2022, 2025
Denmark	Katrine Pedersen	17	1997, 2001, 2005, 2009, 2013
France	Sandrine Soubeyrand	17	1997, 2001, 2005, 2009, 2013
Sweden	Victoria Svensson	17	1997, 2001, 2005, 2009
Germany	Bettina Wiegmann	17	1991, 1993, 1995, 1997, 2001
England	**Lucy Bronze**	16	2013, 2017, 2022, 2025
Germany	Steffi Jones	16	1993, 1997, 2001, 2005
Germany	Silke Rottenberg	16	1993, 1997, 2001, 2005
Sweden	Lotta Schelin	16	2005, 2009, 2013, 2017
Netherlands	**Sherida Spitse**	16	2009, 2013, 2017, 2022, 2025
Norway	Ingvild Stensland	16	2005, 2009, 2013
Netherlands	**Daniëlle van de Donk**	16	2013, 2017, 2022, 2025
