= Maksim Chigaev =

Russian chess grandmaster (born 1996)

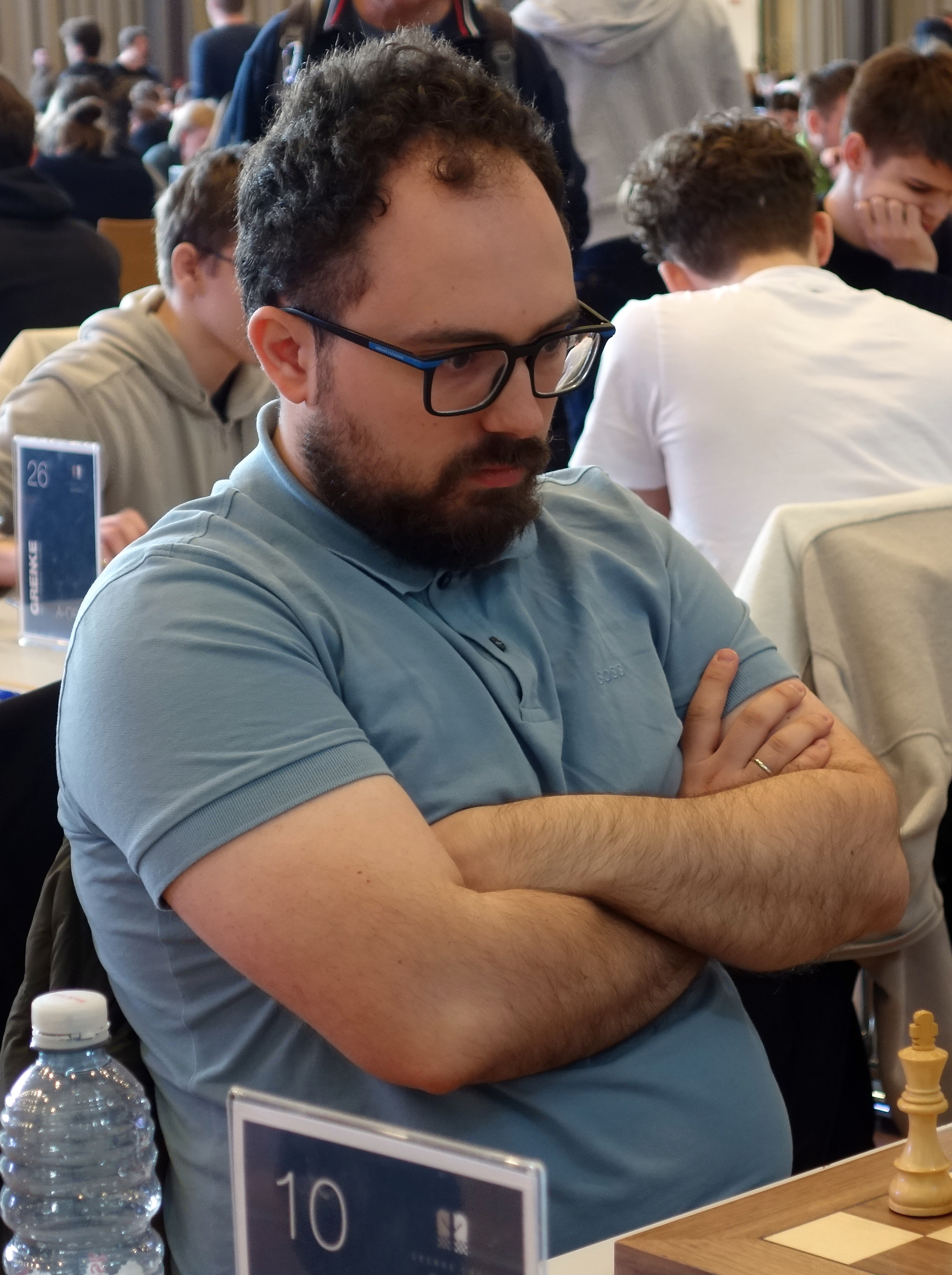
- Chigaev in 2024

Personal information
- Born: November 7, 1996 (age 29) Kemerovo, Russia

Chess career
- Country: Russia (until August 2023); Spain (since August 2023) (Note: Several Russian players' officially switched federations in response to the Russian invasion of Ukraine.)
- Title: Grandmaster (2016)
- FIDE rating: 2648 (July 2026)
- Peak rating: 2648 (June 2024)
- Ranking: No. 71 (July 2026)
- Peak ranking: No. 68 (April 2026)

Maksim Konstantinovich Chigaev (Максим Константинович Чигаев, born 7 November 1996) is a Russian chess player who currently represents Spain. He was awarded the title Grandmaster by FIDE in 2016.

Together with 43 other Russian chess players, Chigaev signed an open letter to Russian president Vladimir Putin, protesting against the Russian invasion of Ukraine and expressing solidarity with the Ukrainian people. In August 2023, he changed federations to Spain.

== Career ==
Chigaev was born in Kemerovo. He played on the Russian team that won the World Youth Under 16 Chess Olympiad in 2012. Chigaev also won an individual gold medal as the best player on the second board. In 2015 he won the Vanya Somov Memorial - World's Youth Stars tournament in Kirishi. In 2018, he played on team Molodezhka of Tyumen which took the bronze medal in both the Russian Team Championships Premier League and the European Club Cup. In January 2019 Chigaev shared second place with Andrey Esipenko and Benjamin Gledura in the Tata Steel Challengers tournament in Wijk aan Zee, the Netherlands scoring 8½ points from 13 games. He competed in the FIDE World Cup 2019 as one of the nominees by the president of FIDE. Chigaev was paired against Parham Maghsoodloo and lost to him by 2–0 and therefore was eliminated from the tournament in the first round.

In October 2020, Chigaev won the Higher League of the 73rd Russian Chess Championship in Sochi with a score of 6.5/9 and qualified for Russian Chess Championship Superfinal later in the year. Chigaev won silver in the Chess.com competition at the 2023 Olympic Esports Week.
