= European Neuropsychopharmacology =

- Discipline: Neuropsychopharmacology
- Language: English
- Edited by: Michael Davidson

Publication details
- History: 1990–present
- Publisher: Elsevier
- Frequency: Monthly
- Impact factor: 4.600 (2020)

Standard abbreviations
- ISO 4: Eur. Neuropsychopharmacol.

Indexing
- CODEN: EURNE8
- ISSN: 0924-977X
- OCLC no.: 795935172

Links
- Journal homepage; Online access; Online archive; Journal page at publisher's website

European Neuropsychopharmacology is a monthly peer-reviewed scientific journal published by Elsevier. It is the official journal of the European College of Neuropsychopharmacology. It was established in November 1990 and covers clinical and basic research relevant to the effects of centrally acting agents in its broadest sense.

According to the Journal Citation Reports, the journal has a 2020 impact factor of 4.600, ranking it 26th out of 192 journals in the category "Clinical Neurology", 24th out of 140 journals in the category "Psychiatry", and 31st out of 254 journals in the category "Pharmacology and Pharmacy".

== See also ==
- List of psychiatry journals
