= Olympic Esports Series =

Esports competition

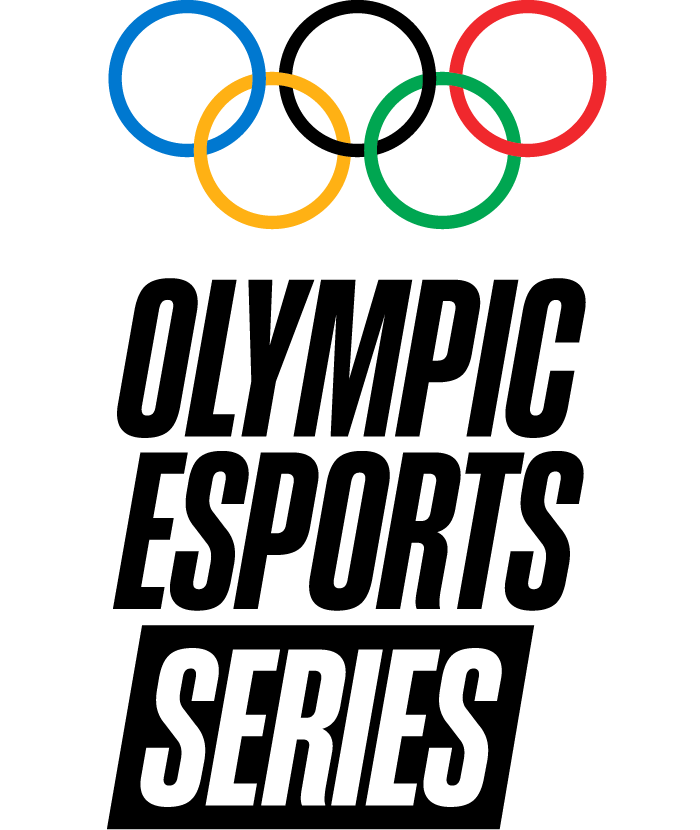
The logo of the Olympic Esports Series

The Olympic Esports Series (Note: While French is the second official language of the Olympic Movement, the name of the Olympic Esports Series is not translated in French.) was an Olympic Games-style esports event featuring multiple different virtual sports and video games coming together in a single location similar to a multi-sport event, run by the International Olympic Committee.

While esports and competitive video gaming have traditionally not been considered a sport, the Olympic Movement began taking an interest as early as 2007, when esports was included at the 2007 Asian Indoor Games. In 2017, an Olympic Summit was held focused on the International Olympic Committee and esports. After an online-only Olympic Virtual Series was held during the COVID-19 pandemic in 2021, the IOC eventually announced the creation of the Olympic Esports Series, as part of the Olympic Esports Week in November 2022. The inaugural edition was held in Singapore in June 2023, with a second edition planned for 2024, which did not take place.

The events at the Olympic Esports Series had a connection with traditional Olympic sports, as the video game titles selected were chosen by international federations. It featured a mix of both physical sport taking place in a virtual world, such as in Zwift, as well as sports-based video games such as Gran Turismo. The lack of traditional esports titles at the Olympic Esports Series, and the inclusion of lesser-known games representing traditional Olympic sports, was subject of criticism.

Unlike at the regular Olympic Games, medals and diplomas were not awarded at the Olympic Esports Series. The top three in each event were awarded gold, silver, and bronze-coloured trophies instead.

Following its approval at the 142nd IOC Session, the Olympic Esports Series is set to be replaced by the Olympic Esports Games, slated to be held every two years in-between the Summer and Winter Olympics starting in 2027, originally planned for 2025. The 2027 games will take place in Riyadh, the capital city of Saudi Arabia.

== Background ==
Traditional esports titles such as Counter-Strike, Dota and League of Legends have been considered to be "too violent" for inclusion in an Olympic-style esports competition. An Olympic Summit was held in October 2017 to consider the possible adoption of esports by the Olympic Movement, with a further IOC Esports Forum held in July 2018. However, the lack of a single international federation to govern esports, a requirement for a sport to be recognised as an Olympic sport, along with the issue of violence in games, meant the IOC would not consider adding esports to the Olympic Games.

Other sporting events, such as the Asian Games held by the Olympic Council of Asia and the Southeast Asian Games, recognise esports as a medal event. It was first added to a major Games at the 2007 Asian Indoor Games, and became a full medal event of the Asian Games starting with the 2022 Asian Games held in 2023.

== 2021 Olympic Virtual Series ==
After the COVID-19 pandemic led to the postponement of the 2020 Summer Olympics to 2021, the inaugural IOC-backed esports event, known as the Olympic Virtual Series, was announced for 2021. Sports included in that were baseball, cycling, motorsport, rowing, and sailing – four of which would return as part of the Olympic Esports Series in 2023.

A second Olympic Virtual Series was planned for 2022, but did not take place, instead being replaced by the Olympic Esports Series.

=== Events and trophy winners ===
Event	Gold	Silver	Bronze
Baseball home run derby	Ryohei Osaka; Japan	Yusuke Tominaga; Japan	Hiroki Horiike; Japan
Baseball tournament finals eBaseball Powerful Pro Baseball 2020	Syoma Mori; Japan	Yoshinori Kato; Japan	Yosuke Fujimoto; Japan
Cycling ultimate chase race (Note: The sport of cycling included two events - ultimate chase race and 24-hour group ride. The 24-hour group ride event is non-competitive.)	Alistair Brownlee; Great Britain	Lucy Charles-Barclay; Great Britain	John Kariuki; Kenya
Motorsport	Valerio Gallo; Italy	Mikail Hizal; Germany	Baptiste Beauvois; France
Rowing; Open format	Colombia		
Sailing inshore - nacra 17	Arthur Farley; Great Britain	Bart Lambriex; Netherlands	Joan Cardona; Spain
Sailing inshore - ILCA dinghy	Kaan Mazlumca; Turkey	Filippo Lanfranchi; Italy	Gaéten de Kat; France
Sailing inshore - 49er	Lukas Mohr; Denmark	Arthur Farley; Great Britain	Tangi Le Golf; France
Sailing offshore	Erik Danielsson; Sweden	Christopher Powers; United States	Luiz Carlos Bonetti; Brazil

== 2023 Olympic Esports Week ==
2023 Olympic Esports Week
- Host city: Singapore
- Motto: Play Beyond Possible
- Organisers: International Olympic Committee, Singapore National Olympic Council
- Edition: 1st
- Athletes: 131 from 57 nations (Note: A sailing offshore event, considered part of the 2023 Olympic Esports Series, was held entirely online with no in-person finals, and was open to players worldwide. This offshore event is not counted.)
- Events: 10 in 10 sports, plus 6 exhibition events across 5 video game titles
- Opening: 22 June 2023
- Closing: 25 June 2023
- Opened by: President of Singapore Halimah Yacob
- Main venue: Suntec Singapore Convention and Exhibition Centre
- Website: olympics.com/en/esports/olympic-esports-series/

In November 2022, the IOC announced that the inaugural Olympic Esports Week, set to be held in Singapore in June 2023, would include the in-person live finals of the 2023 Olympic Esports Series. The initial nine game titles and sports were announced on 1 March 2023, with a tenth event in shooting (Fortnite) added on 5 May.

The first Olympic Esports Series finals were held in person from 23 to 25 June 2023 in Singapore at the Suntec Singapore Convention and Exhibition Centre, as part of the inaugural Olympic Esports Week, which began a day earlier on 22 June with an opening ceremony.

At the opening ceremony, both IOC president Thomas Bach and the President of Singapore, Halimah Yacob, appeared remotely, with Halimah – who was on a state visit to Qatar at the time of the event – declaring the Olympic Esports Week open in her speech.

Some 131 finalists took part in the Olympic Esports Week, which consisted of ten events in ten Olympic sports, while trophies were also awarded in an 11th event which had been held completely online. The sports involved were archery, baseball, chess, cycling, dance, motorsport, sailing, shooting, taekwondo, and tennis. The game chosen for each sport was put forward by each international sports federation in conjunction with the game's publisher, except for Fortnite in shooting where Epic Games disclaimed any involvement.

Eight Olympians competed in the taekwondo event: Wu Jingyu from China, who ended up winning bronze; Rohullah Nikpai of Afghanistan; Leonardo Basile (Italy); Aaron Cook (Great Britain and Moldova); Carmen Marton of Australia; Yasmina Aziez from France; Hwang Kyung-seon of South Korea; and Nur Tatar of Turkey.

Additionally, the chess event featured nine grandmasters and one female International Master: Aleksei Sarana, Maksim Chigaev, Nguyễn Ngọc Trường Sơn, Aleksandr Rakhmanov, Oleksandr Bortnyk, Samvel Ter-Sahakyan, Bassem Amin, Tin Jingyao, Kevin Goh, and Irene Kharisma Sukandar. This was the first IOC-sanctioned event at which Russian athletes – Chigaev and Rakhmanov – took part as "individual neutral athletes" (or AIN, from the French "athlètes individuels neutres"), as well as competing alongside a Ukrainian – Bortnyk, following the 2022 Russian invasion of Ukraine and subsequent suspension of the Russian Olympic Committee from the IOC.

The event reportedly drew 20,000 spectators to the Suntec Convention Centre over the four days.

=== Events and trophy winners ===
Event	Gold	Silver	Bronze
Archery; Tic Tac Bow	Jared Montgomery; United States	David Chan; United States	Kyosuke Takebayashi; Japan
Baseball	Shoma Mori; Japan	Hiroki Horiike; Japan	Wang Chia-Ming; Chinese Taipei
Chess	Aleksey Sarana; Serbia	Maksim Chigaev (International Olympic Committee) Individual Neutral Athletes	Nguyễn Ngọc Trường Sơn; Vietnam
Cycling	Team Fuego; Martin Maertens (GER); James Barnes (RSA); Lou Bates (GBR); Marlene Bjärehed (SWE)	Team Epic; Ben Hill (AUS); Michał Kamiński (POL); Jacquie Godbe (USA); Charlotte Colclough (GBR)	Team Lava; Teppo Laurio (FIN); Lionel Vujasin (BEL); Alice Lethbridge (GBR); Kong Lam (HKG)
Dance	Amandine Morisset; France	Joseph Cordero; United States	Antonino Pomilia; Italy
Motorsport	Kylian Drumont; France	William Murdoch; Great Britain	Angel Inostroza; Chile
Sailing inshore	Tim Carpentier; France	Cavan Fyans; Great Britain	Francisco Melo; Portugal
Sailing offshore (Note: Was not held as part of the Olympic Esports Week in Singapore, although the trophies were awarded in-person.)	Baptiste Renaut; France	Xavier Coquard; France	Aurélie Martin; France
Shooting	Lucas Malissa; Australia	Alexander Feyzjou; United States	Andrej Piratov; Latvia
Taekwondo; Virtual Taekwondo	Nigel Tan; Singapore	Natalie Tor; Singapore	Wu Jingyu; China
Tennis; Tennis Clash	Anass Benghazi; France	He Shenghao; China	William Foster; Great Britain

=== Exhibition events ===
As well as the ten events forming the Olympic Esports Series, the Olympic Esports Week in 2023 also included exhibition events in more traditional esports titles such as Rocket League, Street Fighter 6, and NBA 2K23, as well as the sports-focused Arena Games Triathlon in a duathlon format as well as Virtual Table Tennis.

The Rocket League category featured two events: a men's show match between Karmine Corp and Gen.G and won by Karmine Corp, and a women's show match between G2 Luna and Williams Resolve, won by Resolve. Street Fighter 6 was held as a four-player double-elimination tournament, and eventually won by Thailand's Thum Homchuen. That tournament also featured Hajime Taniguchi, aka Tokido, considered a legend in the Street Fighter esports scene. NBA 2K23 was held as a single round-robin event with no official winner, and was contested by the national eFIBA teams of Philippines, Brazil, and Türkiye.

== Criticism ==
The primary criticism when the Olympic Esports Series was announced was the IOC's choice of game titles, with only Gran Turismo and Just Dance having significant global recognition and Power Pros within Japan. The list of nine initial titles was described by Polygon as "odd", although the IOC's explanation was that the games chosen aligned with the Olympic Values and were proposed by international sports governing bodies.

Many involved with the esports industry were unhappy with the game list, with The Guardian quoting a digital agency representative as saying: "Last week’s announcement left us feeling disappointed and, honestly, a little embarrassed. Instead of working with existing game publishers or well-established tournaments, it seems that the Olympic committee has instead decided to use this event as a marketing vehicle for brand-new, poorly thought out, unlicensed mobile games." Gaming and esports website Dexerto reported on the online reaction, which saw esports fans responding negatively to the IOC's announcement on Twitter, describing the list of games as an "out-of-touch lineup". Some of the criticism, from Western fans, was also directed at the fact that many of the games selected were mobile titles.

However, there was some acceptance from the esports community over the IOC's reasoning for its game selection, including from Global Esports Federation vice-president Chester King, the chief executive of British Esports, who called it "a very sensible first approach" because "we've got to make sure all the stakeholders in the IOC accept it and like it". Additional criticism came after Fortnite was added to the game list for 2023, as the normal battle royale mode – featuring shooting at other characters – was removed in favour of a specially created format in which players would shoot targets instead. In a video segment, IGN called it "the dumbest Olympic esport". After the conclusion of the first event, the lack of participation from African players was criticised, with an opinion piece in Kenya's Daily Nation questioning the decision of the IOC to use online qualifiers for the Olympic Esports Series, due to connectivity and stability issues in Africa which make staying connected to servers a "logistical challenge".

== Olympic Esports Games ==
In June 2024, the IOC Executive Board announced that it would create an Olympic Esports Games, with the 142nd IOC Session held during the 2024 Summer Olympics due to vote on the proposal. In July 2024, it was announced that the inaugural Olympic Esports Games would be held in Riyadh, Saudi Arabia, following a new partnership with the Saudi Arabian Olympic Committee. The proposal was ultimately approved by a unanimous vote on 23 July 2024.
