= Sheffield & Hallamshire County Football Association =

Local governing body of football in England

Sheffield and Hallamshire County Football Association
- Formation: 1867
- General Manager: Simon Frost
- President: M. Matthews
- Affiliations: The Football Association (1871)
- Website: www.sheffieldfa.com

The Sheffield and Hallamshire Football Association is a County Football Association in England. It was formed in Sheffield in 1867 as the Sheffield Football Association, and is the second-oldest football governing body after the Football Association (FA). Its teams adopted the Sheffield Rules of football until 1878, when they were merged with the FA's rules. Its members include the two oldest football clubs in the world, Sheffield and Hallam.

Today, the County FA is responsible for the administration, control, promotion and development of grass-roots football within a 20-mile radius of Sheffield Cathedral. This covers almost all of South Yorkshire (excluding only the area around Askern, Hatfield and Thorne) as well as parts of North Derbyshire (e.g. Dronfield), North Nottinghamshire (e.g. Worksop), and southern parts of West Yorkshire (e.g. Emley, Hemsworth).

== History ==
Organised football started in Sheffield in 1857 with the birth of Sheffield Football Club and the creation of Sheffield Rules. By the early 1860s, there were over 15 clubs in the Sheffield area and they were the first to start inter-club games. This was done with no formal body in overall control with Sheffield Rules used by the majority of clubs.

The Sheffield Football Association was founded by the end of January 1867, with Harry Chambers, secretary of Sheffield FC, serving as its first President. It claimed membership of 14 clubs, representing over 1,000 members. The Association issued its first set of rules on 6 March 1867, basing them on the FA's rules which had been formulated in February of the same year.

Although the Youdan Cup took place between February and March 1867, and was competed for by most of the Association's member clubs, it was organized by a separate committee and was unable to use the Sheffield FA's rules, since they were not issued until the day after the Cup's final. A second cup, the Cromwell Cup, was played the next year under the auspices of the Sheffield Association. It was only open to teams under two years old, and was won by The Wednesday.

On 2 December 1871, the Sheffield Association played the first inter-association game with the London Association, beating them 3–1 at Bramall Lane. Despite losing the game, the London Association (now known as the F.A.) became the primary association which led to the national adoption of the London rules. However, the Sheffield Association continued to have some influence and on 17 February 1872 proposed Rule VII introducing the corner-kick to the Association Rules.

Over the next few years, matches against the associations of Birmingham, Glasgow, North Wales, Manchester and Staffordshire were arranged. Other non-association friendlies were played notably against the Wanderers, the Swifts and the Royal Engineers.

The first annual competition, the Sheffield Association Challenge Cup, was introduced in the 1876–77 season. This was joined by the Wharncliffe Charity Cup two years later. Both were won by Wednesday, who had become the dominant force in local football, in their first year.

The creep of professionalism began in 1876 when Wednesday brought down James Lang from Glasgow. He was officially hired by the club but received a job with no formal duties from one of the members of the club board. The association subsequently had to deal with open professionalism when members of The Zulus received payment for matches. A number of players were banned, so many in fact that it led to the abandonment of the 1882 Sheffield Challenge Cup final. In 1885, professionalism was made legal but the Sheffield Association, led by Charles Clegg and William Peirce Dix remained firm opponents of professionalism in football.

In 1877, a rival association given the name Sheffield New was established in protest of Sheffield FA's decision not to allow any club under two years old to become a member. It later changed its name to Hallamshire Football Association. This situation persisted until the end of the 1886–87 season when a merger of the two associations was negotiated by Clegg who took charge of the new association with Dix employed as secretary.

The clubs of the Sheffield F.A. of 1877 were Albion, Artillery and Hallamshire Rifles, Attercliffe, Brightside, Brincliffe, Broomhall, Crookes, Exchange, Exchange Brewery, Fir Vale, Gleadless, Hallam, Heeley, Kimberworth, Millhouses, Norfolk, Norfolk Works, Owlerton, Oxford, Parkwood Springs, Philadelphia, Rotherham, Sheffield, Surrey, Thursday Wanderers, Wednesday.

== Competitions ==
=== Men's ===
- Sheffield & Hallamshire County Senior League (levels 11-13)
- Sheffield & Hallamshire Senior Cup (clubs at levels 5-11)
- Sheffield & Hallamshire Association Cup (clubs at levels 12-14)
- Sheffield & Hallamshire Junior Cup (clubs at levels 15-)

=== Women's ===
- Sheffield & Hallamshire Women's County League (clubs at levels 7-9)
- Sheffield & Hallamshire Women's Challenge Cup (clubs at levels 1-7)

== Affiliated clubs ==
Unlike most County FAs, which cover a historic county of England, teams are affiliated to the S&HCFA if they are located within a 20-mile radius of Sheffield Cathedral, although this rule is not set in stone. Hundreds of football clubs are affiliated to the association.

As of 2026/27, the following S&HCFA-affiliated clubs compete in senior men's and women's football (not including reserve teams):

=== Men's teams ===
Club	League
Level 2
Sheffield United	Football League Championship
Sheffield Wednesday	Football League Championship
Level 3
Barnsley	Football League One
Doncaster Rovers	Football League One
Rotherham United	Football League One
Level 6
Worksop Town	National League North Division
Level 7
Emley	Northern Premier League Premier Division
Level 8
Hallam	Northern Premier League Division One East
Stocksbridge Park Steels	Northern Premier League Division One East
Level 9
Dearne & District	Northern Counties East League Premier Division
Frickley Athletic	Northern Counties East League Premier Division
Handsworth	Northern Counties East League Premier Division
Parkgate	Northern Counties East League Premier Division
Penistone Church	Northern Counties East League Premier Division
Rossington Main	Northern Counties East League Premier Division
Sheffield	United Counties League Premier Division North
Worsbrough Bridge Athletic	Northern Counties East League Premier Division
Level 10
Armthorpe Welfare	Northern Counties East League Division One
Athersley Recreation	Northern Counties East League Division One
Hemsworth Miners Welfare	Northern Counties East League Division One
Kinsley Boys	Northern Counties East League Division One
Maltby Main	United Counties League Division One
Swallownest	United Counties League Division One
Wombwell Town	Northern Counties East League Division One
Level 11
AFC Bentley	Central Midlands Alliance League Premier Division North
AFC Dronfield	Sheffield & Hallamshire County Senior League Premier Division
AFC Phoenix	Central Midlands Alliance League Premier Division North
Brodsworth Main	Central Midlands Alliance League Premier Division North
Burngreave United	Central Midlands Alliance League Premier Division North
Denaby Main	Sheffield & Hallamshire County Senior League Premier Division
Dinnington Town	Central Midlands Alliance League Premier Division North
Dodworth Miners Welfare	Sheffield & Hallamshire County Senior League Premier Division
Ecclesfield Red Rose	Sheffield & Hallamshire County Senior League Premier Division
Elite	Central Midlands Alliance League Premier Division North
Evo	Central Midlands Alliance League Premier Division North
Hall Green United	West Yorkshire Association League Premier Division
Harworth Colliery	Central Midlands Alliance League Premier Division North
Hepworth United	Sheffield & Hallamshire County Senior League Premier Division
Kiveton Park	Sheffield & Hallamshire County Senior League Premier Division
Nostell Miners Welfare	Sheffield & Hallamshire County Senior League Premier Division
Oughtibridge War Memorial	Sheffield & Hallamshire County Senior League Premier Division
Silkstone United	Sheffield & Hallamshire County Senior League Premier Division
Rossington	Central Midlands Alliance League Premier Division North
Shelley	Yorkshire Amateur League Supreme Division
SJR Worksop	Central Midlands Alliance League Premier Division North
South Elmsall United Services	Sheffield & Hallamshire County Senior League Premier Division
Swinton Athletic	Sheffield & Hallamshire County Senior League Premier Division
Thorncliffe Villa	Sheffield & Hallamshire County Senior League Premier Division
Wombwell Main	Sheffield & Hallamshire County Senior League Premier Division
Level 12
AFC Manton Club	Central Midlands Alliance League Premier Division North
Barnsley Town	Sheffield & Hallamshire County Senior League Division One
Bentley Village	Sheffield & Hallamshire County Senior League Division One
Jubilee Sports	Central Midlands Alliance League Premier Division North
North Gawber Colliery	Sheffield & Hallamshire County Senior League Division One
Royston	Sheffield & Hallamshire County Senior League Division One
Sheffield City	Sheffield & Hallamshire County Senior League Division One
Sheffield Union	Sheffield & Hallamshire County Senior League Division One
Level 13
Durkar	Yorkshire Amateur League Championship
Middlewood Rovers	Sheffield & Hallamshire County Senior League Division Two
Rotherham Town	Sheffield & Hallamshire County Senior League Division Two
Sheffield Medics	Sheffield & Hallamshire County Senior League Division Two
Treeton Terriers	Sheffield & Hallamshire County Senior League Division Two
Tusaale United	Sheffield & Hallamshire County Senior League Division Two
West End Terriers	Sheffield & Hallamshire County Senior League Division Two
Youdan	Sheffield & Hallamshire County Senior League Division Two
Level 14
Askern Miners	Doncaster Saturday League
Bawtry Town	Doncaster Saturday League
Carcroft Village	Doncaster Saturday League
Cumberworth	Huddersfield & District League Premier Division
Denaby United	Doncaster Saturday League
Edenthorpe	Doncaster Saturday League
Holmbridge	Huddersfield & District League Premier Division
Wooldale Wanderers	Huddersfield & District League Premier Division
Yorkshire Main	Doncaster Saturday League
Level 15
Crofton Sports	Wakefield & District Football League Division One
Hade Edge	Huddersfield & District League Division One
Scissett	Yorkshire Amateur League Division Two
Level 16
Kirkburton	Huddersfield & District League Division Two
Scholes	Huddersfield & District League Division Two
Level 17
Cartworth Moor	Huddersfield & District League Division Three
Level 18
Grange Moor	Huddersfield & District League Division Four
Holmfirth Town	Huddersfield & District League Division Four

Location of SHCFA league clubs entered into the 2026-27 FA Cup (map of South Yorkshire)

=== Women's teams ===
Club	League
Level 2
Sheffield United Women	FA Women's Super League Two
Level 3
Huddersfield Town Women	FA WNL Premier Division
Level 4
Barnsley Women's	FA WNL Division One Midlands
Sheffield Women	FA WNL Division One Midlands
Level 5
Doncaster Rovers Belles	EMRWL Premier Division
Rotherham United Women	NERWL Premier Division
SJR Worksop Women	EMRWL Premier Division
Level 6
Dronfield Town Ladies	EMRWL Division One North
Handsworth Ladies	NERWL Division One South
Rossington Main Ladies	NERWL Division One South
Sheffield Wednesday Ladies	NERWL Division One South
Level 7
Barnsley Ladies	S&HWL Division One
Brodsworth Main Women	S&HWL Division One
Dinnington Town Ladies	S&HWL Division One
Frickley Athletic Women	S&HWL Division One
Millmoor Juniors Ladies	S&HWL Division One
Oughtibridge War Memorial Women	S&HWL Division One
Sheffield United Community Foundation Ladies	S&HWL Division One
Stocksbridge Park Steels Ladies	S&HWL Division One
Level 8
Brinsworth Whitehill Women	S&HWL Division Two
Charnock Ridgeway Ladies	S&HWL Division Two
Dearne & District Ladies	S&HWL Division Two
Kiveton Park Women	S&HWL Division Two
Parkgate Ladies	S&HWL Division Two
Penistone Church Women	S&HWL Division Two
Socrates Ladies	S&HWL Division Two
Level 9
Brampton United Women	S&HWL Division Three
Chancet Wood Women	S&HWL Division Three
Edenthorpe Ladies	S&HWL Division Three
Hepworth United Ladies	WRWL Division Two
Maltby Juniors Ladies	S&HWL Division Three
Swallownest Miners Welfare Ladies	S&HWL Division Three
Wickersley Youth Ladies	S&HWL Division Three
Level 10
FURD Ladies	S&HWL Division Four
New Lodge WMC Ladies	S&HWL Division Four
Scawthorpe Scorpions Ladies	S&HWL Division Four
Sheffield Medics Women	S&HWL Division Four
West End Terriers Ladies	S&HWL Division Four
Level 11
AFG Pogmoor Ladies	S&HWL Division Five
Aston Swallownest Ladies	S&HWL Division Five
Bramley Stingers Ladies	S&HWL Division Five
Durkar Devils Ladies	WRCWL Division Four
Kinsley Ladies	S&HWL Division Five
Rotherham Town Ladies	S&HWL Division Five
Rossington Ladies	S&HWL Division Five
Level 12
Kirkburton Junior Women	WRCWL Division Five

Location of SHCFA women's clubs entered into the 2025–26 Women's FA Cup (map of South Yorkshire

== Representative teams ==
The Sheffield & Hallamshire FA formerly ran the Sheffield representative team that was active from the earliest days of the game in the 1860s, playing against select teams from cities such as London and Glasgow, the series against the latter running from 1874 to 1960.

Since 1944 an U18 side has represented the Sheffield & Hallamshire FA in the FA County Youth Cup, winning the competition in 1953 and 1964.
