= Sheffield & Hallamshire Women's Challenge Cup =

- Current champions: Barnsley Ladies

The Sheffield & Hallamshire Women's Challenge Cup is a women's county cup competition involving teams within the Sheffield and Hallamshire County Football Association.

== 2021-22 Participants ==
Club	Level	League
AFC Bentley	7	Sheffield & Hallamshire Women's League Division One
Barnsley F.C.Ladies	6	North East Regional Women's Football League Division One South
Barnsley Women	4	FA Women's National League Division One North
Barnsley Women reserves	N/A	FA Women's National League Reserve Division North
Barnsley Women development	7	Sheffield & Hallamshire Women's League Division One
Bolsover Town	9	Sheffield & Hallamshire Women's League Division Three
Doncaster Rovers Belles	4	FA Women's National League Division One Midlands
Dronfield Town	7	Sheffield & Hallamshire Women's League Division One
Eckington Belles	9	Sheffield & Hallamshire Women's League Division Three
Hall Green United	9	West Riding County Women's League Division Two
Handsworth	7	Sheffield & Hallamshire Women's League Division One
Handsworth development	8	Sheffield & Hallamshire Women's League Division Two
Harworth Colliery	7	Sheffield & Hallamshire Women's League Division One
Hepworth United	6	North East Regional Women's Football League Division One South
Hepworth United reserves	9	West Riding County Women's League Division Two
Huddersfield Town	3	FA Women's National League Premier Division North
Huddersfield Town reserves	N/A	FA Women's National League Reserve Division North
Kiveton Park	8	Sheffield & Hallamshire Women's League Division Two
Kiveton Park development	9	Sheffield & Hallamshire Women's League Division Three
Millmoor Juniors	6	North East Regional Women's Football League Division One South
Millstone	9	Sheffield & Hallamshire Women's League Division Three
Mosborough	8	Sheffield & Hallamshire Women's League Division Two
Oughtibridge War Memorial	5	East Midlands Regional Women's Football League Premier Division
Penistone Church	9	Sheffield & Hallamshire Women's League Division Three
Rotherham United	5	East Midlands Regional Women's Football League Premier Division
Rotherham United reserves	9	Sheffield & Hallamshire Women's League Division Three
Rotherham United Whitehill	7	Sheffield & Hallamshire Women's League Division One
Sheffield	3	FA Women's National League Premier Division North
Sheffield City	8	Sheffield & Hallamshire Women's League Division Two
Sheffield United reserves	N/A	N/A
Sheffield United Community Foundation	7	Sheffield & Hallamshire Women's League Division One
Sheffield United Community Foundation reserves	8	Sheffield & Hallamshire Women's League Division Two
Sheffield Wednesday	5	North East Regional Women's Football League Premier Division
Sheffield Wednesday reserves	7	Sheffield & Hallamshire Women's League Division One
Sheffield Wednesday development	8	Sheffield & Hallamshire Women's League Division Two
Socrates	8	Sheffield & Hallamshire Women's League Division Two
St Joseph's Rockware of Worksop	6	East Midlands Regional Women's Football League Division One South
Staveley Miners Welfare	9	Sheffield & Hallamshire Women's League Division Three
Swallownest Swallows	8	Sheffield & Hallamshire Women's League Division Two
Wakefield Trinity	5	North East Regional Women's Football League Premier Division
Wakefield Trinity U23	6	North East Regional Women's Football League Division One South
Wakefield Trinity U21	7	Sheffield & Hallamshire Women's League Division One
West End Terriers	9	West Riding County Women's League Division Two
Wickersley Youth	8	Sheffield & Hallamshire Women's League Division Two
Worsbrough Bridge Athletic	8	Sheffield & Hallamshire Women's League Division Two

== Finals ==
Season	Winner	Result	Runner-up	Venue	Notes
2005–06	Doncaster Rovers Belles	2 – 0	Sheffield Wednesday Ladies	Keepmoat Stadium	
2006–07	Sheffield Wednesday Ladies	1 – 0	Doncaster Rovers Belles	Cannon Park	
2007–08	Doncaster Rovers Belles	4 – 0	Sheffield Wednesday Ladies	Keepmoat Stadium	
2008–09	Doncaster Rovers Belles	5 – 0	Sheffield Wednesday Ladies	Keepmoat Stadium	
2009–10	Doncaster Rovers Belles	3 – 0	Rotherham United Ladies	Bracken Moor	
2010–11	Rotherham United Ladies	2 – 0	Huddersfield Town	Bracken Moor	
2011–12	Sheffield Ladies	4 – 0	Sheffield Wednesday Ladies	Bracken Moor	
2012–13	Sheffield Ladies	6 – 0	Rotherham United Ladies	Inkersall Road	
2013–14	Sheffield Ladies	5 – 1	Steel City Wanderers	Bracken Moor	
2014–15	Sheffield Ladies	4 – 1	Huddersfield Town Ladies	Roundwood Sports Complex	
2015–16	Barnsley Ladies	4 – 2	Huddersfield Town Ladies	Roundwood Sports Complex	
2016–17	Huddersfield Town Ladies	2 – 1	Barnsley Ladies	St. George's Park Graves	
2017–18	Huddersfield Town Ladies	3 – 0	Barnsley Ladies	Keepmoat Stadium	
2018–19	Barnsley Ladies	3 – 3(wp)	Huddersfield Town Ladies	New York Stadium	(4p1)
2021–22	Huddersfield Town Women	5 – 0	Barnsley Women	Eco-Power Stadium	
2022–23	Huddersfield Town Women	1 – 0	Doncaster Rovers Belles	Eco-Power Stadium	
2023–24	Huddersfield Town Women	3 – 2	Doncaster Rovers Belles	Hillsborough Stadium	
2024–25	Sheffield United Women U21	5 – 0	Huddersfield Town Women	New York Stadium	
2025–26	Huddersfield Town Women	7 – 0	Sheffield F.C. Women	Eco-Power Stadium	

== See also ==
- Sheffield & Hallamshire Women's County League
