= 2026–27 Women's FA Cup =

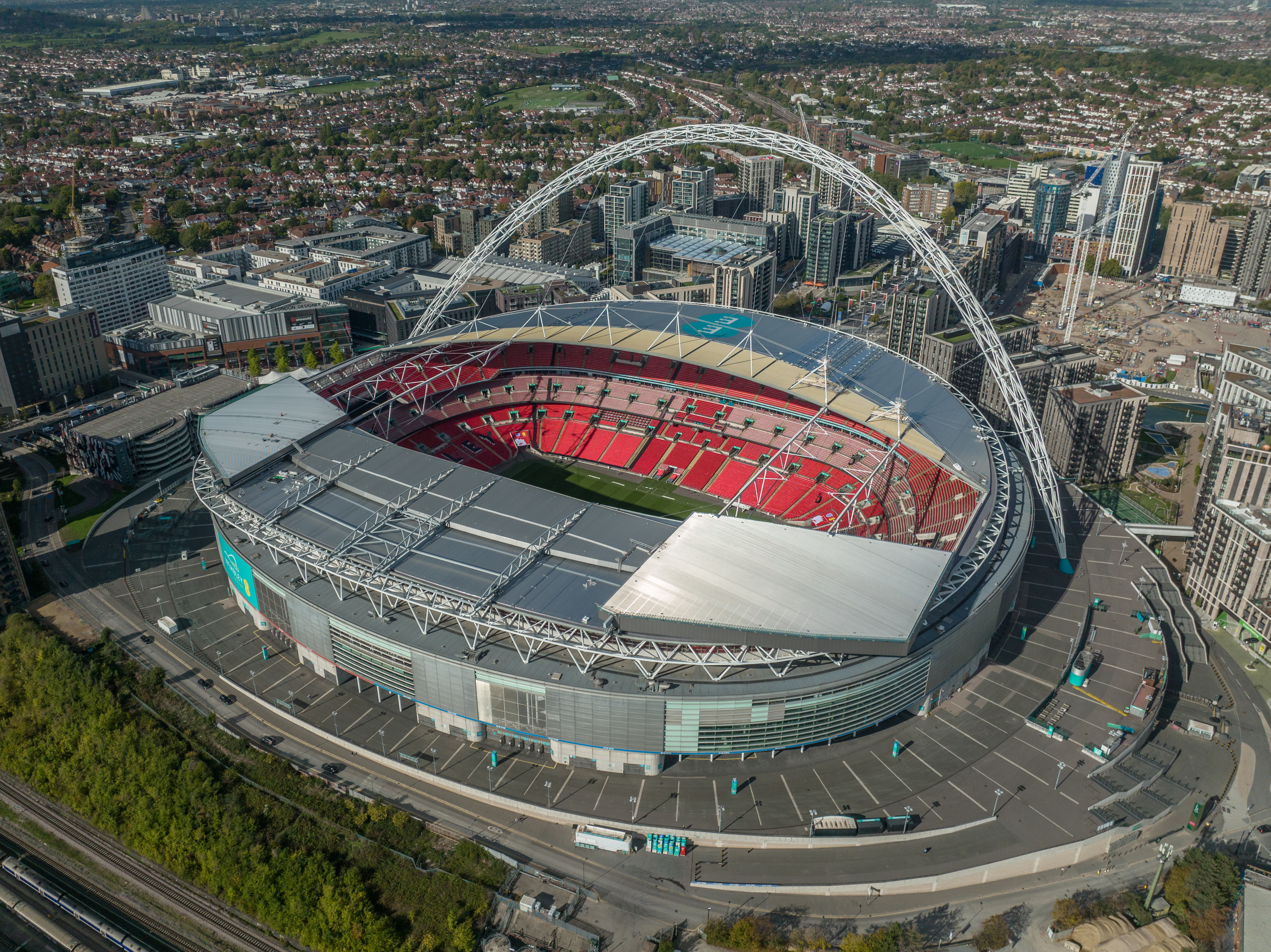
- Wembley Stadium will host the final on 15 May 2027

Tournament details
- Country: England; Wales
- Dates: 23 August 2026 – 15 May 2027
- Teams: 535

Tournament statistics
- Matches played: 468
- Goals scored: 2,201 (4.7 per match)
- All statistics correct as of 15 November 2026.

The 2026–27 Women's FA Cup will be the 57th staging of the Women's FA Cup, a knockout cup competition for women's football teams in England. Manchester City are the defending champions, having beaten Brighton & Hove Albion 4–0 in the 2026 final on 31 May 2026.

== Teams ==
A total of 535 teams were accepted into the 2026–27 Women's FA Cup, a decrease of 3 from the previous year. 93 tier 5 teams were given an exemption until the second round qualifying stage, with the 48 tier 4 teams that play in the FA Women's National League Division One given an exemption until third round qualifying. Teams in the Northern and Southern Premier Divisions (tier 3) will enter at the first round, and the 12 Women's Super League 2 teams (tier 2) will enter in the third round. The final teams to enter the competition, the 14 Women's Super League teams (tier 1), will enter at the fourth round.

| Round | Clubs remaining | Clubs involved | Winners from previous round | Games played | Goals scored | Prize money | |
| Round | Clubs remaining | Clubs involved | Winners from previous round | Games played | Goals scored | Winner | Loser |
|---|---|---|---|---|---|---|---|
| Preliminary round | 535 | 286 | – | 130 | 618 | £1,000 | £400 |
| First round qualifying | 392 | 204 | 143 | 102 | 540 | £1,800 | £450 |
| Second round qualifying | 290 | 192 (Note: 90 Tier 5 regional premier division teams added) | 102 | 95 | 451 | £3,500 | £1,000 |
| Third round qualifying | 194 | 144 (Note: 48 FA Women's National League Division One teams added) | 96 | 71 | 327 | £4,500 | £1,500 |
| First round | 122 | 96 (Note: 24 FA Women's National League Premier Division teams added) | 72 | 47* | 151* | £7,000 | £2,500 |
| Second round | 74 | 48 | 48 | 23* | 114* | £9,000 | £4,000 |
| Third round | 50 | 36 (Note: 12 Women's Super League 2 teams added) | 24 | 18 | | £35,000 | £9,000 |
| Fourth round | 32 | 32 (Note: 14 Women's Super League teams added) | 18 | 16 | | £54,000 | £13,000 |
| Fifth round | 16 | 16 | 16 | 8 | | £80,000 | £20,000 |
| Quarter-final | 8 | 8 | 8 | 4 | | £90,000 | £22,500 |
| Semi-final | 4 | 4 | 4 | 2 | | £160,000 | £40,000 |
| Final | 2 | 2 | 2 | 1 | | £430,000 | £108,000 |

== Preliminary round ==
The competition started at the preliminary round with 130 matches played on 23 August 2026, and made up of teams from the sixth-tier regional and seventh–tier county division football leagues.

| Tie | Home team (tier) | Score | Away team (tier) | Att. |
|---|---|---|---|---|
| 1 | Guisborough Town (6) | 1–5 | West Allotment Celtic (7) | |
| 2 | Boro Rangers (7) | 0–4 | Morpeth Town Juniors (7) | |
| 3 | Stockton Town (6) | 4–0 | North Shields Athletic (6) | |
| 4 | Darlington (7) | 5–0 | Hartlepool United (7) | 103 |
| 5 | Whitehaven (7) | 2–3 | Wolviston (7) | |
| 6 | Gateshead Leam Rangers (6) | 1–7 | Workington Town (6) | |
| 7 | Penrith AFC (6) | 9–1 | FC Hartlepool (7) | 70 |
| 8 | Heaton Hawks (7) | 3–4 | Heddon United (7) | 52 |
| 9 | Northallerton Town (7) | 0–9 | Boldon Community Association (6) | |
| 10 | Carlisle United (7) | 1–1 (7–6 p) | Harrogate Railway (7) | |
| 11 | Washington (6) | 0–3 | Hebburn Town (7) | 77 |
| 12 | GT7 (7) | 3–2 | Prudhoe Town (7) | |
| 13 | Gateshead Rutherford (6) | 4–0 | Knaresborough Town (6) | 159 |
| 14 | Evolution (6) | 1–3 | Redcar Town (6) | |
| 15 | Cramlington United (7) | 3–2 | Cramlington Town (7) | |
| 16 | Wyke Wanderers (7) | 5–1 | Frickley Athletic (7) | 50 |
| 17 | Millmoor Juniors (7) | 3–1 | Forge Way (7) | |
| 18 | FC Farsley (6) | 4–1 | Elloughton Blackburn (7) | 162 |
| 19 | Cherry Burton (7) | 2–2 (3–4 p) | Dinnington Town (7) | |
| 20 | Dronfield Town (6) | 4–2 | Golcar United (7) | 147 |
| 21 | Beverley Town (7) | 1–1 (8–7 p) | Sherburn White Rose (7) | 122 |
| 22 | Inglemire (7) | 2–6 | Bottesford Town (6) | |
| 23 | Chesterfield Community Trust (6) | 3–1 | Sheffield Wednesday (6) | |
| 24 | North Ferriby (7) | 1–0 | AFC Tickton (7) | |
| 25 | Leeds Medics & Dentists (7) | 1–2 | Silsden (7) | |
| 26 | Altofts (6) | 1–1 (4–3 p) | Cleethorpes Town (6) | |
| 27 | Brandesburton (7) | 0–7 | Rossington Main (6) | |
| 28 | Brodsworth Main (7) | 2–1 | Thackley (6) | 203 |
| 29 | Staveley Miners (6) | 9–0 | Brigg Town (7) | 118 |
| 30 | Oughtibridge War Memorial (7) | A–W | YP (6) | |
Oughtibridge War Memorial withdrew
| 31 | Haslingden (6) | H–W | Ashton Town (6) | |
Ashton Town withdrew
| 32 | Northwich Victoria (7) | 1–4 | Wirral Phoenix (6) | |
| 33 | Winsford Town (7) | 0–6 | Penwortham Town (7) | |
| 34 | Blackburn Community (6) | 3–1 | Lancaster City (7) | |
| 35 | Salford City Lionesses (6) | 5–1 | Blackpool (6) | |
| 36 | Wigan Athletic Women (6) | 10–0 | Winton Wanderers (7) | |
| 37 | Wigan Athletic Ladies & Girls (6) | 4–1 | Oldham Athletic (7) | 270 |
| 38 | Lymm Rovers (7) | A–W | Atherton Laburnum Rovers (7) | |
Lymm Rovers withdrew
| 39 | Morecambe (6) | 3–1 | Altrincham (6) | |
| 40 | Curzon Ashton (7) | 2–0 | Runcorn Linnets (6) | |
| 41 | Hyde United (7) | 1–0 | Maghull (7) | |
| 42 | MSB Woolton (6) | 10–0 | Blackburn Eagles (7) | |
| 43 | Wirral United (6) | 2–0 | Radcliffe (7) | 70 |
| 44 | St Michaels (7) | 0–6 | Colne (7) | |
| 45 | FC Northern (6) | 2–9 | Chester (6) | |
| 46 | Mossley Hill Athletic (6) | 1–3 | Pilkington (7) | 25 |
| 47 | Fleetwood Town Wrens (6) | 1–2 | Wythenshawe Town (6) | |
| 48 | Rochdale (6) | 1–0 | Accrington Stanley (6) | |
| 49 | Spalding United (6) | 2–2 (5–4 p) | Belper Town (6) | |
| 50 | Thurmaston DPC Vixens (6) | 8–0 | NN United (7) | 89 |
| 51 | Amber Valley (7) | 0–5 | Dunton & Broughton United (6) | 100 |
| 52 | Newark Town (6) | 2–2 (2–4 p) | Long Eaton United (6) | 124 |
| 53 | Coalville Town (6) | 2–2 (3–4 p) | Kirby Muxloe (7) | 125 |
| 54 | Melbourne Dynamos (6) | 4–3 | Woodhall Spa United (7) | 150 |
| 55 | Stanground Cardea Sports (6) | 1–1 (3–0 p) | Bugbrooke St Michaels (7) | |
| 56 | Allexton & New Parks (7) | 0–4 | Sherwood (6) | |
| 57 | Saffron Dynamo (7) | 0–3 | Brookside Athletic (7) | 250 |
| 58 | Netherton United (6) | 2–1 | Pride Park (6) | 103 |
| 59 | Arnold Eagles (6) | H–W | River City (7) | |
River City withdrew
| 60 | University of Nottingham (6) | 0–0 (4–5 p) | Wellingborough Town (6) | |
| 61 | Anstey Nomads (6) | A–W | Basford United (6) | |
Anstey Nomads withdrew
| 62 | Boston Town (7) | A–W | Birstall United (7) | |
Boston Town withdrew
| 63 | Moulton (7) | 0–2 | Thrapston Town (6) | 75 |
| 64 | Radcliffe Olympic (7) | 2–1 | Leicester City Ladies (6) | |
| 65 | Shrewsbury Up & Comers (6) | 0–0 (5–4 p) | Bolehall Swifts (7) | 60 |
| 66 | Ellesmere Rangers (7) | 0–6 | Alvechurch (6) | |
| 67 | Arden Forest (7) | 0–7 | Sutton United (Birmingham) (6) | 49 |
| 68 | Evesham United (6) | 5–1 | Burton Albion (6) | 104 |
| 69 | Rugby Town (6) | 3–0 | Tamworth (7) | |
| 70 | Coton Green (6) | 2–0 | Telford Town (6) | 40 |
| 71 | Dudley Town (6) | 2–2 (3–4 p) | Whitchurch Alport (6) | |
| 72 | Halesowen Town (6) | 4–0 | Kingfisher (7) | 199 |

| Tie | Home team (tier) | Score | Away team (tier) | Att. |
|---|---|---|---|---|
| 73 | Broseley (7) | 1–1 (4–2 p) | Redditch United (6) | 80 |
| 74 | Milton United (Staffordshire) (7) | 1–1 (3–5 p) | Crusaders (6) | |
| 75 | Bromsgrove Sporting (6) | 0–4 | AFC Telford United (6) | 80 |
| 76 | Nunnery Wood United (7) | 2–1 | Stone Old Alleynians (7) | |
| 77 | Leamington (6) | 2–3 | Droitwich Spa (6) | 95 |
| 78 | Ludlow Town (7) | 2–6 | Long Itchington (6) | 47 |
| 79 | Lane Head (6) | 8–0 | Newcastle Town (6) | |
| 80 | Inkberrow (7) | 0–18 | Walsall (6) | |
| 81 | Fulbourn Bluebirds (7) | 0–3 | Brightlingsea Regent (7) | |
| 82 | Stowupland Falcons (7) | 1–3 | Newmarket Town (7) | |
| 83 | Colchester United (6) | H–W | Mulbarton Wanderers (6) | |
Mulbarton Wanderers withdrew
| 84 | Woodbridge Town (7) | 0–1 | Needham Market (6) | |
| 85 | Brantham Athletic (7) | A–W | Thetford Town (6) | |
Brantham Athletic withdrew
| 86 | Sprowston (7) | 0–5 | Costessey Sports (6) | 91 |
| 87 | Cambridge City (6) | 9–0 | Soham Town Rangers (7) | 125 |
| 88 | Cambridge Rangers (7) | 0–0 (3–2 p) | Deeping Rangers (7) | |
| 89 | Potters Bar Crusaders (7) | 3–11 | Berkhamsted (7) | |
| 90 | Islington Borough (7) | 1–1 (4–3 p) | East Thurrock Community (7) | 100 |
| 91 | Toby (6) | 4–1 | London Academicals (7) | |
| 92 | Ware United (7) | 3–3 (3–4 p) | Hutton (6) | |
| 93 | Enfield Town (6) | 3–0 | Wormley Rovers (6) | 135 |
| 94 | Milton Keynes Irish (7) | 11–0 | Brackley Town (7) | 127 |
| 95 | Hertford Town (6) | 2–0 | Sport London e Benfica (6) | 118 |
| 96 | Garston (7) | 3–1 | United Dragons (7) | |
| 97 | Colney Heath (7) | 3–0 | Oaklands Wolves (7) | 79 |
| 98 | Southend United (6) | 2–3 | Frontiers (7) | 85 |
| 99 | Biggleswade United (7) | 1–2 | Chelmsford City (6) | |
| 100 | South London (7) | 2–2 (3–5 p) | Ebbsfleet United (6) | |
| 101 | Hollands & Blair (7) | 3–2 | Carshalton Athletic (6) | 130 |
| 102 | Maidstone United (6) | 4–1 | Hastings United (6) | 143 |
| 103 | Oxted & District (7) | 0–7 | Camden Town (6) | 60 |
| 104 | Tunbridge Wells Foresters (7) | 7–1 | Eastbourne Town (7) | |
| 105 | AFC Croydon Athletic (7) | 1–3 | Cray Wanderers (7) | |
| 106 | Ashford United (6) | 2–1 | Ashmount Leigh (6) | 70 |
| 107 | Croydon (7) | H–W | Biddenden (7) | |
Biddenden withdrew
| 108 | Herne Bay (6) | H–W | Sevenoaks Town (6) | |
Sevenoaks Town withdrew
| 109 | Kidlington (6) | 6–1 | Salisbury (7) | |
| 110 | Mudeford Phoenix (7) | 1–1 (5–6 p) | Windsor & Eton (7) | 185 |
| 111 | Wallingford & Crowmarsh (7) | 2–2 (4–2 p) | Basingstoke Town (7) | 70 |
| 112 | Finchampstead (6) | 1–2 | Whitchurch United (6) | |
| 113 | Marlborough Town (8) | 1–1 (5–4 p) | Barton United (7) | 250 |
| 114 | Ashridge Park (7) | 0–6 | Slough Town (6) | |
| 115 | Melksham Town (7) | 4–1 | Caversham United (7) | |
| 116 | Bournemouth Manor (7) | 0–11 | Andover New Street (6) | |
| 117 | Three Bridges (6) | 0–4 | Leatherhead (6) | 65 |
| 118 | Farnborough (6) | 2–2 (4–5 p) | Badshot Lea (6) | 220 |
| 119 | Guernsey (6) | 2–3 | Chessington & Hook United (8) | |
| 120 | AFC Stoneham (6) | 4–0 | Liphook United (7) | |
| 121 | Bognor Regis Town (6) | 4–0 | Steyning Town Community (6) | 160 |
| 122 | Jersey Bulls (7) | H–W | United Services Portsmouth (7) | |
United Services Portsmouth withdrew
| 123 | Walton & Hersham (7) | 0–3 | Montpelier Villa (6) | |
| 124 | Horsham (7) | A–W | Havant & Waterlooville (6) | |
Horsham withdrew
| 125 | Broadbridge Heath (7) | 1–5 | Burgess Hill Town (7) | 50 |
| 126 | Bath City (6) | 4–2 | Paulton Rovers (6) | |
| 127 | Bishops Lydeard (6) | 1–0 | Weston Super Mare (6) | |
| 128 | Wimborne Town (6) | 3–0 | Longfleet Lionesses (7) | 135 |
| 129 | Ilminster Town (6) | 4–0 | Dorchester Town (7) | 74 |
| 130 | Frome Town (7) | 0–6 | Ridgeway (6) | 123 |
| 131 | Stockwood Wanderers (6) | 1–4 | Wells City (6) | 70 |
| 132 | Olveston United (7) | 1–2 | Hereford Pegasus (7) | |
| 133 | Hartpury (6) | 4–4 (4–5 p) | Cirencester Town (6) | |
| 134 | Bristol & West (7) | 2–2 (2–4 p) | Ross Juniors (7) | 60 |
| 135 | Whitchurch (6) | 1–2 | Mangotsfield United (6) | |
| 136 | Bishops Cleeve (6) | 2–1 | Cheltenham Civil Service (7) | 117 |
| 137 | Frampton Rangers (6) | A–W | Downend Flyers (6) | |
Frampton Rangers withdrew
| 138 | Bideford (7) | 1–3 | Kilkhampton (7) | |
| 139 | Newquay (6) | 0–7 | Plympton (7) | 93 |
| 140 | Tiverton Town (7) | 7–0 | Saltash Borough (7) | 105 |
| 141 | Teignmouth (7) | 0–2 | Feniton (6) | |
| 142 | St Agnes (6) | 7–0 | Bodmin (7) | |
| 143 | Bradworthy (7) | 9–1 | Callington Town (7) | 106 |

== First round qualifying ==
The draw for the first round qualifying took place on 31 July 2026 and included the introduction of a further 61 teams from the sixth-tier regional and seventh–tier county division football leagues. 100 matches were played on 6 September 2026, with two abandoned fixtures played the following week.

| Tie | Home team (tier) | Score | Away team (tier) | Att. |
|---|---|---|---|---|
| 1 | Wolviston (7) | 4–0 | Wigginton Grasshoppers (7) | |
| 2 | Sunderland West End (6) | 3–4 | Penrith AFC (6) | |
| 3 | Gateshead Rutherford (6) | 0–2 | Stockton Town (6) | |
| 4 | Blyth Spartans (7) | 3–1 | West Allotment Celtic (7) | 182 |
| 5 | Boldon Community Association (6) | 5–1 | Heddon United (7) | |
| 6 | Carlisle United (7) | 2–4 | Darlington (7) | |
| 7 | Cramlington United (7) | 1–5 | Hebburn Town (7) | |
| 8 | Redcar Town (6) | 1–1 (2–3 p) | Morpeth Town Juniors (7) | |
| 9 | Workington Town (6) | 4–0 | GT7 (7) | 30 |
| 10 | FC Farsley (6) | 2–6 | Brodsworth Main (7) | |
| 11 | Millmoor Juniors (7) | 3–8 | Wyke Wanderers (7) | |
| 12 | Ilkley Town (6) | 2–5 | Dronfield Town (6) | |
| 13 | Silsden (7) | 4–2 | Rossington Main (6) | 201 |
| 14 | Handsworth (6) | 14–0 | Stocksbridge Park Steels (7) | |
| 15 | Lower Hopton (6) | 4–3 | Beverley Town (7) | |
| 16 | Dinnington Town (7) | 0–3 | Staveley Miners (6) | |
| 17 | Altofts (6) | 6–1 | Bottesford Town (6) | 46 |
| 18 | North Ferriby (7) | 3–1 | Chesterfield Community Trust (6) | 150 |
| 19 | YP (6) | 4–0 | Horsforth St Margarets (7) | 158 |
| 20 | Morecambe (6) | 2–1 | Wythenshawe Town (6) | |
| 21 | MSB Woolton (6) | 3–3 (4–1 p) | Colne (7) | |
| 22 | Wigan Athletic Women (6) | 2–2 (4–3 p) | Chester (6) | |
| 23 | Atherton Laburnum Rovers (7) | 5–3 | Curzon Ashton (7) | |
| 24 | Rochdale (6) | 3–2 | Penwortham Town (7) | |
| 25 | Salford City Lionesses (6) | 5–0 | Warrington Town (6) | |
| 26 | Haslingden (6) | 1–2 | Wigan Athletic Ladies & Girls (6) | |
| 27 | Marine (7) | 0–3 | Wirral Phoenix (6) | 55 |
| 28 | Burscough (7) | 0–10 | Hyde United (7) | |
| 29 | Blackburn Community (6) | 2–4 | Pilkington (7) | |
| 30 | Wirral United (6) | 4–2 | Maine Road (7) | 44 |
| 31 | Brookside Athletic (7) | 2–3 | Asfordby Amateurs (6) | |
| 32 | Wellingborough Town (6) | 6–2 | Birstall United (7) | 89 |
| 33 | Melbourne Dynamos (6) | 0–3 | Thrapston Town (6) | |
| 34 | Sherwood (6) | 0–0 (4–5 p) | Netherton United (6) | 41 |
| 35 | Oakham United (6) | 3–3 (4–2 p) | Dunton & Broughton United (6) | |
| 36 | Kirby Muxloe (7) | 4–0 | Ruston Sports (7) | |
| 37 | Spalding United (6) | 1–3 | Stanground Cardea Sports (6) | |
| 38 | Harpole (7) | 0–4 | Thurmaston DPC Vixens (6) | |
| 39 | Corby Steelers (7) | 0–0 (5–6 p) | Arnold Eagles (6) | 52 |
| 40 | Long Eaton United (6) | 5–1 | Radcliffe Olympic (7) | 90 |
| 41 | Basford United (6) | 5–0 | Higham Town (6) | 43 |
| 42 | Broseley (7) | 2–1 | Leamington Lions (7) | |
| 43 | Nunnery Wood United (7) | 2–6 | Long Itchington (6) | |
| 44 | Coton Green (6) | 4–1 | Lane Head (6) | |
| 45 | Halesowen Town (6) | 3–2 | Crusaders (6) | 251 |
| 46 | Doveridge (7) | 0–3 | Sutton United (Birmingham) (6) | |
| 47 | Rugby Town (6) | 4–0 | Shawbury United (7) | |
| 48 | Shrewsbury Up & Comers (6) | 1–1 (4–1 p) | Whitchurch Alport (6) | 103 |
| 49 | Bilston Town (7) | 0–14 | Alvechurch (6) | |
| 50 | Worthen Juniors (7) | 0–8 | AFC Telford United (6) | 75 |
| 51 | Evesham United (6) | 2–4 | Walsall (6) | 173 |

| Tie | Home team (tier) | Score | Away team (tier) | Att. |
|---|---|---|---|---|
| 52 | Droitwich Spa (6) | 4–1 | Chasetown (6) | |
| 53 | Lowestoft Town (7) | 1–4 | Needham Market (6) | 107 |
| 54 | Colchester United (6) | 3–1 | Cambridge City (6) | |
| 55 | Newmarket Town (7) | 8–1 | Cambridge Rangers (7) | |
| 56 | Aylsham (7) | 0–5 | Brightlingsea Regent (7) | |
| 57 | Costessey Sports (6) | 1–4 | Thetford Town (6) | |
| 58 | Toby (6) | 0–3 | Dunstable (6) | |
| 59 | Islington Borough (7) | 3–3 (7–6 p) | Berkhamsted (7) | 50 |
| 60 | Hackney (6) | 1–5 | Enfield Town (6) | |
| 61 | Frontiers (7) | 0–2 | Ampthill Town (6) | 65 |
| 62 | Hitchin Belles (6) | 2–0 | AFC Leyton (7) | 126 |
| 63 | Leyton Orient (6) | 1–5 | Milton Keynes Irish (7) | 250 |
| 64 | Hutton (6) | 4–3 | Leigh Ramblers (7) | |
| 65 | Chelmsford City (6) | 4-0 | Hertford Town (6) | |
| 66 | Colney Heath (7) | 2–1 | Garston (7) | 92 |
| 67 | AFC Welwyn (6) | 3–6 | Clapton Community (6) | |
| 68 | Tooting Bec (6) | 3–2 | AFC Greenwich Borough (6) | 50 |
| 69 | Cray Wanderers (7) | 0–3 | Camden Town (6) | |
| 70 | Kings Hill (7) | 1–3 | Ashford United (6) | |
| 71 | Hollands & Blair (7) | 1–3 | Tonbridge Angels (6) | |
| 72 | Herne Bay (6) | 5–0 | Tunbridge Wells Foresters (7) | |
| 73 | Ebbsfleet United (6) | 7–0 | Chislehurst Glebe (7) | 30 |
| 74 | Croydon (7) | 0–5 | Maidstone United (6) | |
| 75 | Corsham Town (6) | 5–1 | Whitchurch United (6) | |
| 76 | Wallingford & Crowmarsh (7) | 1–1 (4–5 p) | Melksham Town (7) | |
| 77 | Windsor & Eton (7) | 2–3 | Andover New Street (6) | |
| 78 | Penn & Tylers Green (6) | 7–1 | Kidlington (6) | |
| 79 | Slough Town (6) | 2–2 (2–4 p) | Marlborough Town (8) | 130 |
| 80 | Bognor Regis Town (6) | 3–1 | Jersey Bulls (7) | 115 |
| 81 | AFC Stoneham (6) | 5–1 | Bursledon (6) | |
| 82 | Chessington & Hook United (8) | 0–4 | Havant & Waterlooville (6) | |
| 83 | Badshot Lea (6) | 1–0 | Burgess Hill Town (7) | |
| 84 | Hassocks (7) | 0–16 | AFC Varsity (6) | 100 |
| 85 | Millbrook (6) | 6–2 | Aldershot Town (7) | 84 |
| 86 | Pagham (7) | 0–11 | Leatherhead (6) | 30 |
| 87 | Montpelier Villa (6) | 4–1 | Kingsmeadow United (7) | 70 |
| 88 | Saltford (7) | 1–5 | Ilminster Town (6) | |
| 89 | Wimborne Town (6) | 2–0 | Bournemouth Poppies (7) | |
| 90 | Bishops Lydeard (6) | 0–2 | Shaftesbury (7) | |
| 91 | Pen Mill (6) | 0–3 | Bath City (6) | 50 |
| 92 | Wells City (6) | 3–2 | Ridgeway (6) | |
| 93 | Hereford (6) | 2–13 | Mangotsfield United (6) | 106 |
| 94 | Ross Juniors (7) | 2–0 | Bristol Brunel (6) | |
| 95 | Cirencester Town (6) | 1–2 | Dursley Town (7) | 81 |
| 96 | Southmead (7) | 1–1 (2–4 p) | Hereford Pegasus (7) | |
| 97 | Downend Flyers (6) | 1–3 | Bishops Cleeve (6) | |
| 98 | Stoke Gabriel & Torbay Police (7) | 0–12 | Feniton (6) | |
| 99 | Tiverton Town (7) | 2–1 | St Dennis (7) | 90 |
| 100 | Plympton (7) | 3–5 | Sticker (6) | |
| 101 | Signal Box Frankfort (7) | 1–0 | Kilkhampton (7) | |
| 102 | Bradworthy (7) | 1–2 | St Agnes (6) | |

== Second round qualifying ==
The draw for the second round qualifying took place on 7 September 2026 and included the introduction of 90 teams from the fifth–tier regional premier division football leagues. 95 matches will be played on 20 September 2026. Sherborne Town received a bye from this round.

| Tie | Home team (tier) | Score | Away team (tier) | Att. |
|---|---|---|---|---|
| 1 | Blyth Spartans (7) | 1–1 (3–0 p) | Morpeth Town Juniors (7) | 313 |
| 2 | Workington Town (6) | 2–1 | Boldon Community Association (6) | 100 |
| 3 | South Shields (5) | 2–0 | Hebburn Town (7) | |
| 4 | Penrith AFC (6) | 0–0 (3–4 p) | i2i International (5) | 70 |
| 5 | Alnwick Town (5) | 0–0 (3–1 p) | Birtley Town (5) | |
| 6 | Wallsend BC (5) | 4–3 | Darlington (7) | |
| 7 | Stockton Town (6) | 5–0 | Wolviston (7) | 220 |
| 8 | Ponteland United (5) | 1–4 | Spennymoor Town (5) | 75 |
| 9 | YP (6) | 8–0 | Gainsborough Trinity (5) | 108 |
| 10 | Mansfield Town (5) | 2–1 | Ossett United (5) | |
| 11 | Wyke Wanderers (7) | 3–6 | Harrogate Town (5) | |
| 12 | North Ferriby (7) | 4–3 | Silsden (7) | 200 |
| 13 | Staveley Miners (6) | 0–1 | Altofts (6) | 123 |
| 14 | Brodsworth Main (7) | 2–3 | Doncaster Rovers Belles (5) | |
| 15 | SJR Worksop (5) | 4–1 | Dronfield Town (6) | |
| 16 | Leeds Modernians (5) | 2–1 | Handsworth (6) | |
| 17 | Lower Hopton (6) | 0–6 | Rotherham United (5) | 155 |
| 18 | Atherton Laburnum Rovers (7) | 1–2 | Crewe Alexandra (5) | |
| 19 | Leek Town (5) | 0–1 | Wigan Athletic Women (6) | 134 |
| 20 | Poulton Victoria (5) | 0–6 | Salford City Lionesses (6) | |
| 21 | Rochdale (6) | 1–3 | Nantwich Town (5) | |
| 22 | Wirral Phoenix (6) | 1–0 | Wigan Athletic Ladies & Girls (6) | |
| 23 | Morecambe (6) | 1–9 | Bury (5) | |
| 24 | Preston North End (5) | 5–1 | Wirral United (6) | |
| 25 | MSB Woolton (6) | 2–5 | FC St Helens (5) | |
| 26 | Bolton Wanderers (5) | 1–0 | FC United of Manchester (5) | |
| 27 | Pilkington (7) | 0–7 | Tranmere Rovers (5) | |
| 28 | West Didsbury & Chorlton (5) | 2–7 | Mancunian Unity (5) | |
| 29 | Darwen (5) | 5–1 | Hyde United (7) | |
| 30 | Kirby Muxloe (7) | 4–1 | Long Eaton United (6) | |
| 31 | Basford United (6) | 4–1 | Stanground Cardea Sports (6) | 59 |
| 32 | Grimsby Town (5) | 3–1 | Arnold Eagles (6) | 110 |
| 33 | Netherton United (6) | 0–6 | Nottingham Trent University (5) | |
| 34 | Stamford (5) | 4–3 | Loughborough Foxes Vixens (5) | |
| 35 | Wellingborough Town (6) | 1–2 | Thurmaston DPC Vixens (6) | 111 |
| 36 | Oakham United (6) | 3–2 | Thrapston Town (6) | |
| 37 | Asfordby Amateurs (6) | 0–2 | Lincoln (5) | |
| 38 | Coton Green (6) | 2–2 (3–2 p) | AFC Telford United (6) | 52 |
| 39 | Shrewsbury Up & Comers (6) | 0–6 | Redditch Borough (5) | |
| 40 | Coventry Sphinx (5) | 3–3 (3–1 p) | Lichfield City (5) | |
| 41 | Hednesford Town (5) | 3–2 | Shifnal Town (5) | 110 |
| 42 | Knowle (5) | 0–2 | Port Vale (5) | |
| 43 | Droitwich Spa (6) | 3–2 | Long Itchington (6) | |
| 44 | Broseley (7) | 3–4 | Walsall (6) | 100 |
| 45 | Rugby Town (6) | 1–4 | Sutton United (Birmingham) (6) | |
| 46 | Alvechurch (6) | 3–1 | Halesowen Town (6) | 150 |
| 47 | Coundon Court (5) | 0–6 | Shrewsbury Town (5) | |
| 48 | Solihull Moors (5) | 5–0 | Stourbridge (5) | |

| Tie | Home team (tier) | Score | Away team (tier) | Att. |
|---|---|---|---|---|
| 49 | Brentwood Town (5) | 0–0 (3–4 p) | AFC Sudbury (5) | |
| 50 | Colchester United (6) | 4–1 | Newmarket Town (7) | |
| 51 | Chelmsford City (6) | 4–2 | Clapton Community (6) | |
| 52 | Brightlingsea Regent (7) | 0–5 | Barking (5) | |
| 53 | Dussindale & Hellesdon (5) | 1–0 | Colney Heath (7) | 40 |
| 54 | Needham Market (6) | 0–9 | Haringey Borough (5) | |
| 55 | Hutton (6) | 0–15 | Bowers & Pitsea (5) | |
| 56 | Histon (5) | 3–3 (5–6 p) | Wroxham (5) | |
| 57 | Royston Town (5) | 2–0 | Atletico London (5) | |
| 58 | Enfield Town (6) | 8–2 | Thetford Town (6) | 82 |
| 59 | Tooting Bec (6) | 2–0 | Maidstone United (6) | 65 |
| 60 | Herne Bay (6) | 0–2 | Newhaven (5) | |
| 61 | Bromley (5) | 3–2 | Sutton United (5) | 91 |
| 62 | Dorking Wanderers (5) | 0–4 | Brentford (5) | |
| 63 | Hammersmith (5) | 3–3 (4–3 p) | Eastbourne Borough (5) | |
| 64 | Montpelier Villa (6) | 0–1 | Islington Borough (7) | |
| 65 | Worthing (5) | 3–1 | Leatherhead (6) | |
| 66 | Tonbridge Angels (6) | 3–2 | Ashford United (6) | 78 |
| 67 | Ebbsfleet United (6) | 0–6 | Camden Town (6) | |
| 68 | Aylesford (5) | 1–4 | Denham United (5) | |
| 69 | Millwall Lionesses (5) | 1–1 (4–3 p) | Ashford Town (Middx) (5) | 75 |
| 70 | Watford Ladies Development (5) | 2–1 | Newport Pagnell Town (5) | |
| 71 | Oxford City (5) | 12–0 | Penn & Tylers Green (6) | 224 |
| 72 | Woodley United (5) | 1–4 | Chesham United (5) | 84 |
| 73 | Ampthill Town (6) | 1–1 (3–4 p) | Hitchin Belles (6) | |
| 74 | Reading (5) | 4–1 | Beaconsfield Town (5) | |
| 75 | Dunstable (6) | 2–6 | Harpenden Town (5) | |
| 76 | Milton Keynes Irish (7) | 3–0 | St Albans City (5) | 116 |
| 77 | Andover New Street (6) | 3–3 (4–3 p) | Sholing (5) | |
| 78 | AFC Stoneham (6) | 3–1 | Havant & Waterlooville (6) | |
| 79 | Winchester City Flyers (5) | 7–1 | Fleet Town (5) | |
| 80 | AFC Varsity (6) | 2–1 | Millbrook (6) | |
| 81 | Southampton Women's (5) | 1–2 | AFC Portchester (5) | |
| 82 | Badshot Lea (6) | 1–9 | Farnham Town (5) | |
| 83 | Marlborough Town (8) | 1–5 | Bognor Regis Town (6) | |
| 84 | Ross Juniors (7) | 0–5 | Yate Town (5) | |
| 85 | Dursley Town (7) | 1–0 | Hereford Pegasus (7) | |
| 86 | Royal Wootton Bassett Town (5) | 2–1 | Gloucester City (5) | |
| 87 | Corsham Town (6) | 3–0 | Melksham Town (7) | |
| 88 | Portishead Town (5) | 2–2 (4–1 p) | AEK Boco (5) | |
| 89 | Bishops Cleeve (6) | 3–0 | Bath City (6) | |
| 90 | Wells City (6) | 1–7 | Mangotsfield United (6) | |
| 91 | Signal Box Frankfort (7) | 1–2 | Ilminster Town (6) | |
| 92 | Tiverton Town (7) | 1–4 | Wimborne Town (6) | 147 |
| 93 | Yeovil Town (5) | 1–1 (4–1 p) | Poole Town (5) | |
| 94 | Sticker (6) | 2–2 (4–5 p) | St Agnes (6) | 100 |
| 95 | Feniton (6) | 7–2 | Shaftesbury (7) | |

== Third round qualifying ==
The draw for the third round qualifying took place on 21 September 2026 and included the introduction of 48 teams from the fourth–tier FA Women's National League Division One. 71 matches were played on 4 October 2026.

| Tie | Home team (tier) | Score | Away team (tier) | Att. |
|---|---|---|---|---|
| 1 | Wallsend BC (5) | 0–2 | Wigan Athletic Women (6) | |
| 2 | Halifax (4) | 4–0 | York City (4) | |
| 3 | Norton & Stockton Ancients (4) | 3–1 | Salford City Lionesses (6) | 140 |
| 4 | Harrogate Town (5) | 2–1 | Altofts (6) | |
| 5 | Wirral Phoenix (6) | 0–1 | South Shields (5) | |
| 6 | Preston North End (5) | 7–0 | North Ferriby (7) | |
| 7 | Tranmere Rovers (5) | 1–5 | Bolton Wanderers (5) | |
| 8 | Wythenshawe (4) | 1–2 | Thornaby (4) | |
| 9 | Darwen (5) | 2–4 | Durham Cestria (4) | |
| 10 | AFC Fylde (4) | 3–2 | Blackburn Rovers (4) | |
| 11 | Leeds Modernians (5) | 3–0 | Alnwick Town (5) | |
| 12 | Chester-le-Street Town (4) | 3–1 | FC St Helens (5) | |
| 13 | Bradford City (4) | 0–8 | Stockport County (4) | |
| 14 | Rotherham United (5) | 4–0 | Spennymoor Town (5) | |
| 15 | Doncaster Rovers Belles (5) | 1–1 (3–4 p) | Workington Town (6) | |
| 16 | Barnsley (4) | 1–2 | Mancunian Unity (5) | |
| 17 | Stockton Town (6) | 1–12 | Leeds United (4) | |
| 18 | Blyth Spartans (7) | 0–9 | Chorley (4) | 350 |
| 19 | Bury (5) | 1–3 | i2i International (5) | 182 |
| 20 | Alvechurch (6) | 1–1 (2–3 p) | Mansfield Town (5) | |
| 21 | Coventry Sphinx (5) | 2–3 | SJR Worksop (5) | |
| 22 | Basford United (6) | 0–6 | Kidderminster Harriers (4) | 80 |
| 23 | Walsall (6) | 0–6 | Redditch Borough (5) | |
| 24 | Sporting Khalsa (4) | 8–0 | Oakham United (7) | |
| 25 | Nottingham Trent University (5) | 5–1 | Stamford (5) | 50 |
| 26 | Northampton Town (4) | 7–0 | Sutton United (Birmingham) (6) | |
| 27 | Kirby Muxloe (7) | 0–8 | Notts County (4) | |
| 28 | Chesterfield (4) | 10–0 | Thurmaston DPC Vixens (6) | |
| 29 | Leafield Athletic (4) | 4–1 | Shrewsbury Town (5) | |
| 30 | Crewe Alexandra (5) | 7–4 | Droitwich Spa (6) | |
| 31 | Sheffield (4) | 0–7 | Sutton Coldfield Town (4) | |
| 32 | Hednesford Town (5) | 0–0 (3–5 p) | Nantwich Town (5) | 210 |
| 33 | Solihull Moors (5) | 1–1 (1–4 p) | Grimsby Town (5) | |
| 34 | Worcester City (4) | 1–2 | Port Vale (5) | 134 |
| 35 | Lye Town (4) | H–W | Coton Green (6) | |
Coton Green withdrew
| 36 | Lincoln (5) | 3–0 | YP (6) | 498 |

| Tie | Home team (tier) | Score | Away team (tier) | Att. |
|---|---|---|---|---|
| 37 | Milton Keynes Dons (4) | 5–0 | Colchester United (6) | |
| 38 | Watford Ladies Development (5) | 0–3 | Haringey Borough (5) | |
| 39 | Royston Town (5) | 3–2 | Chesham United (5) | |
| 40 | Enfield Town (6) | 6–0 | Billericay Town (4) | 168 |
| 41 | Hitchin Belles (6) | 0–4 | Cambridge United (4) | |
| 42 | Chelmsford City (6) | 0–1 | Harpenden Town (5) | |
| 43 | Bowers & Pitsea (5) | 3–5 | Barking (5) | |
| 44 | Dussindale & Hellesdon (5) | 3–1 | Milton Keynes Irish (7) | 70 |
| 45 | Stevenage (4) | 0–2 | Wroxham (5) | 50 |
| 46 | Luton Town (4) | 2–1 | AFC Sudbury (5) | 71 |
| 47 | Chatham Town (4) | 2–1 | Farnham Town (5) | |
| 48 | Actonians (4) | 7–0 | Ascot United (4) | |
| 49 | Hammersmith (5) | 3–2 | Wycombe Wanderers (4) | |
| 50 | Denham United (5) | 2–4 | Millwall Lionesses (5) | |
| 51 | Dulwich Hamlet (4) | 1–0 | Newhaven (5) | |
| 52 | Saltdean United (4) | 3–0 | Camden Town (6) | |
| 53 | Islington Borough (7) | 0–7 | Maidenhead United (4) | 47 |
| 54 | Tooting Bec (6) | 2–1 | Oxford City (5) | 125 |
| 55 | Bromley (5) | 1–0 | Reading (5) | 1,208 |
| 56 | Tonbridge Angels (6) | 0–5 | Abingdon United (4) | 89 |
| 57 | Bognor Regis Town (6) | 0–4 | Queens Park Rangers (4) | |
| 58 | London Bees (4) | 0–1 | Dartford (4) | |
| 59 | Worthing (5) | 1–2 | Brentford (5) | |
| 60 | Bridgwater United (4) | 10–0 | Royal Wootton Bassett Town (5) | 98 |
| 61 | AFC Portchester (5) | 4–0 | Bournemouth Sports (4) | 178 |
| 62 | Ilminster Town (6) | 1–3 | Feniton (6) | |
| 63 | Yeovil Town (5) | 1–3 | Portishead Town (5) | |
| 64 | Dursley Town (7) | 0–3 | Andover New Street (6) | |
| 65 | Bristol Rovers (4) | 6–1 | Corsham Town (6) | |
| 66 | Yate Town (5) | 2–0 | Bishops Cleeve (6) | |
| 67 | Keynsham Town (4) | 2–1 | Torquay United (4) | |
| 68 | Gwalia United (4) | 6–0 | AFC Stoneham (6) | 205 |
| 69 | Wimborne Town (6) | 0–4 | Moneyfields (4) | |
| 70 | Marine Academy Plymouth (4) | 3–0 | Sherborne Town (5) | |
| 71 | Mangotsfield United (6) | 2–4 | Winchester City Flyers (5) | |
| 72 | St Agnes (6) | 1–0 | AFC Varsity (6) | |

== First round ==
The draw for the first round took place on 5 October 2026 and included the introduction of 24 teams from the third–tier FA Women's National League Premier Division. 40 matches were played on 24 and 25 October 2026, with eight rearranged fixtures to be played on 1 and 18 November 2026.

| 24 October 2026 | Harrogate Town (5) | 1–3 | Bolton Wanderers (5) | Harrogate |
| 17:30 | Marshall 52' | Report | Lawrence 1'; Stanhope 8'; Wood 14' | Stadium: Marcy Fitness Stadium; Attendance: 376 |

| 25 October 2026 | Exeter City (3) | 2–0 | Hashtag United (3) | Tiverton |
| 12:00 | Whitmore 5', 21' | Report | | Stadium: Slee Blackwell Solicitors Stadium; Attendance: 354 |

| 25 October 2026 | Leeds Modernians (5) | 1–3 | Liverpool Feds (3) | Leeds |
| 14:00 | Fishley 66' | Report | Bouggess 1'; Brady 21'; Jones 35' | Stadium: Cookridge Lane |

| 25 October 2026 | Norton & Stockton Ancients (4) | 2–0 | AFC Fylde (4) | Stockton-on-Tees |
| 14:00 | Owens 68', 87' | Report | | Stadium: Norton Sports; Attendance: 247; Referee: Abi Greenwood |

| 25 October 2026 | Grimsby Town (5) | 0–5 | Stockport County (4) | Cleethorpes |
| 14:00 | | Report | Porteous-Williams 27'; Bradshaw 44', 55'; Lightfoot 69'; Stube 90+5' | Stadium: Blundell Park; Attendance: 575 |

| 25 October 2026 | Durham Cestria (4) | 3–2 | Hull City (3) | Shildon |
| 14:00 | Atkinson 25'; Ward 51'; Mathias 57' | Report | Gibrill-Keating 33'; 83' (o.g.) | Stadium: Dean Street; Attendance: 76 |

| 25 October 2026 | Lincoln (5) | 0–2 | Halifax (4) | Lincoln |
| 14:00 | | Report | Collins 10', 83' | Stadium: Ashby Avenue; Attendance: 224 |

| 25 October 2026 | Thornaby (4) | 4–2 | Chorley (4) | Stockton-on-Tees |
| 14:00 | Curle 28', 45', 52'; Dale 43' | Report | Melvin 45+3', 70' | Stadium: Teesdale Park; Attendance: 196 |

| 25 October 2026 | Kidderminster Harriers (4) | 4–2 | Wroxham (5) | Droitwich Spa |
| 14:00 | Hill 13', 35'; McCann-Lloyd 89'; Lawrence 90+5' | Report | 68'; 87' | Stadium: King George V Ground |

| 25 October 2026 | Sutton Coldfield Town (4) | 1–1 (3–5 p) | Derby County (3) | Sutton Coldfield |
| 14:00 | Kingston 59' | Report | Joyce 40' | Stadium: Central Ground |

| 25 October 2026 | Northampton Town (4) | 0–4 | Stoke City (3) | Northampton |
| 14:00 | | Report | Bradley 13'; Orthodoxou 19'; Edwards 40'; Stamps 43' | Stadium: Fernie Fields; Attendance: 193 |

| 25 October 2026 | West Bromwich Albion (3) | 0–1 | Notts County (4) | Birmingham |
| 14:00 | | Report | Barnes 66' (pen.) | Stadium: Alexander Stadium; Attendance: 128 |

| 25 October 2026 | Port Vale (5) | 1–3 | Boldmere St. Michaels (3) | Stoke-on-Trent |
| 14:00 | Edwards 8' | Report | Clark 45', 50' (pen.); Bailey 88' | Stadium: Norton Cricket Club & Miners Welfare Institute |

| 25 October 2026 | Luton Town (4) | 0–3 | Cambridge United (4) | Barton-le-Clay |
| 14:00 | | Report | Strauss 54'; Milles 65'; Coupar 76' | Stadium: Sharpenhoe Road |

| 25 October 2026 | Leafield Athletic (4) | 4–0 | Mansfield Town (5) | Birmingham |
| 14:00 | Stanford 11'; Gallop 13', 15'; Quirk 52' | Report | | Stadium: Castle Vale; Attendance: 93 |

| 25 October 2026 | Norwich City (3) | 5–2 | Redditch Borough (5) | Norwich |
| 14:00 | Riglar 17'; Harrison 28'; Booty 62'; Moore 80', 84' | Report | Clements 20'; Hood 62' | Stadium: The Nest; Attendance: 218 |

| 25 October 2026 | Royston Town (5) | 0–1 | Crewe Alexandra (5) | Royston |
| 14:00 | | Report | Edwards 68' | Stadium: Garden Walk; Attendance: 287 |

| 25 October 2026 | Milton Keynes Dons (4) | 3–0 | Nantwich Town (5) | Bletchley |
| 14:00 | Neil 50'; Evans 53'; De Viliers 88' (pen.) | Report | | Stadium: Stadium MK; Attendance: 601 |

| 25 October 2026 | Real Bedford (3) | 5–0 | Dussindale & Hellesdon (5) | Bedford |
| 14:00 | Head 29'; Byrom 36'; Mehmet 44'; Delgyn 56'; Komani 67' | Report | | Stadium: McMullen Park; Attendance: 94 |

| 25 October 2026 | Nottingham Trent University (6) | 2–5 | Loughborough Lightning (3) | Nottingham |
| 14:00 | Smoot 53', 89' | Report | Mutch 13' (pen.); Spillman 48'; Chads 54'; West 66'; Greenwood 81' | Stadium: Clifton Sports Hub; Attendance: 189 |

| 25 October 2026 | Portsmouth (3) | 4–0 | Cheltenham Town (3) | Portsmouth |
| 14:00 | Barratt 8'; Beattie 12'; Freeland 74'; Roberts 88' | Report | | Stadium: Fratton Park; Attendance: 495 |

| 25 October 2026 | Queens Park Rangers (4) | 0–1 | Lewes (3) | Hayes |
| 14:00 | | Report | Jones 83' | Stadium: Skyex Community Stadium |

| 25 October 2026 | St Agnes (6) | 0–2 | Portishead Town (5) | St Agnes |
| 14:00 | | Report | Blazey 55'; Knight 60' | Stadium: St Agnes Sports Club |

| 25 October 2026 | Gwalia United (4) | 5–0 | Yate Town (5) | Pontypridd |
| 14:00 | Thomas 1'; Evans 48'; Pearce; Ackerman | Report | | Stadium: USW Sports Park; Attendance: 178 |

| 25 October 2026 | Haringey Borough (5) | 1–2 | Dulwich Hamlet (4) | Tottenham |
| 14:00 | Payne 71' | Report | McFadyen 56'; Roberts 64' | Stadium: Coles Park; Attendance: 200 |

| 25 October 2026 | Abingdon United (4) | 0–6 | Bristol Rovers (4) | Abingdon-on-Thames |
| 14:00 | | Report | Davies 23', 55'; Turner 28'; Rees 47'; Dempsey 73'; Tweddle 85' | Stadium: The Northcourt; Attendance: 150 |

| 25 October 2026 | Brentford (5) | 3–0 | Dartford (4) | Yiewsley |
| 14:00 | Kiszkis 8'; Constantine 13'; Cheatley 45+2' | Report | | Stadium: Honeycroft; Attendance: 179 |

| 25 October 2026 | Plymouth Argyle (3) | 1–1 (6–7 p) | Millwall Lionesses (5) | Plymouth |
| 14:00 | Pullen 79' | Report | Rutherford 90+4' | Stadium: Home Park |

| 25 October 2026 | AFC Bournemouth (3) | 4–0 | Feniton (6) | Weymouth |
| 14:00 | Young 34'; Hall 37', 53'; Bryant 75' | Report | | Stadium: Bob Lucas Stadium; Attendance: 276 |

| 25 October 2026 | Moneyfields (4) | 4–1 | Saltdean United (4) | Portsmouth |
| 14:00 | Hester 18'; Buckingham 34'; 48' (o.g.); Fox 90+3' | Report | 77' | Stadium: John Jenkins Stadium; Attendance: 90 |

| 25 October 2026 | Fulham (3) | 3–0 | Enfield Town (6) | New Malden |
| 14:00 | Lister 11', 79'; Gillies 75' | Report | | Stadium: Motspur Park; Attendance: 228 |

| 25 October 2026 | Winchester City Flyers (5) | 0–1 | Keynsham Town (4) | Winchester |
| 14:00 | | Report | Goal | Stadium: Charters Community Stadium; Attendance: 229 |

| 25 October 2026 | Maidenhead United (4) | 3–0 | Andover New Street (6) | Maidenhead |
| 14:00 | Stockton; Akerman 80'; Robertson 90+3' | Report | | Stadium: York Road; Attendance: 245 |

| 25 October 2026 | AFC Portchester (5) | 0–5 | Oxford United (3) | Portchester |
| 14:00 | | Report | Richardson 48', 70'; Provan 53'; Quirk 66'; Carpenter 87' | Stadium: Wicor Recreation Ground; Attendance: 255 |

| 25 October 2026 | Harpenden Town (5) | 0–0 (2–3 p) | Chesterfield (4) | Harpenden |
| 15:00 | | Report | | Stadium: Rothamsted Park |

| 25 October 2026 | Rugby Borough (3) | 3–0 | Sporting Khalsa (4) | Rugby |
| 15:00 | Shepherd 13'; Wiseman 37'; Brown 85' | Report | | Stadium: Kilsby Lane |

| 25 October 2026 | Actonians (4) | 0–0 (6–7 p) | Marine Academy Plymouth (4) | Feltham |
| 15:00 | | Report | | Stadium: Bedfont Sports |

| 25 October 2026 | Barking (5) | 2–0 | Bromley (5) | Dagenham |
| 15:00 | Bunton; Wills | Report | | Stadium: Mayesbrook Park; Attendance: 95 |

| 25 October 2026 | Tooting Bec (6) | 0–1 | Chatham Town (4) | Morden |
| 15:00 | | Report | Coombs 42' | Stadium: Tooting and Mitcham Community Sports Club |

| 25 October 2026 | Hammersmith (5) | 0–3 | AFC Wimbledon (3) | Hounslow |
| 14:00 | | Report | Dorey 6', 67'; Purchase 35' | Stadium: Gunnersbury Park Sports Hub |

| 1 November 2026 | Workington Town (6) | 0–2 | Mancunian Unity (5) | Workington |
| 14:00 | | Report | Shaw 3'; Kershaw 42' | Stadium: Fibrus Community Stadium; Attendance: 277 |

| 1 November 2026 | Wigan Athletic Women (6) | 1–4 | Chester-le-Street Town (4) | Wigan |
| 14:00 | Millward 12' | Report | Gibson 26', 70'; Hockaday 36'; Baxter 56' | Stadium: Edge Hall Road; Attendance: 268 |

| 1 November 2026 | Preston North End (5) | 0–2 | i2i International (5) | Longridge |
| 14:00 | | Report | Fuentes 72'; Hülphers 90+1' | Stadium: Inglewhite Road; Attendance: 150 |

| 1 November 2026 | Huddersfield Town (3) | 1–2 | Middlesbrough (3) | Emley |
| 14:00 | Livingston 62' | Report | Galloway 30'; Turnbull 47' | Stadium: Welfare Ground |

| 1 November 2026 | South Shields (5) | 0–3 | SJR Worksop (5) | South Shields |
| 14:00 | | Report | McHamilton 35', 38'; Hynson 53' | Stadium: Harton Welfare Club |

| 1 November 2026 | Leeds United (4) | 2–0 | Rotherham United (5) | Garforth |
| 14:00 | Spencer-Smith 37'; Legge 75' | Report | | Stadium: Wheatley Park; Attendance: 280; Referee: Thomas Halloway |

| 1 November 2026 | Swindon Town (3) | 1–1 (2–4 p) | Bridgwater United (4) | Swindon |
| 14:00 | Colston 32' | Report | Jarvis 90+5' (pen.) | Stadium: Imagine Cruising Stadium |

| 22 November 2026 | Lye Town (4) | 0–3 | Peterborough United (3) | Peterborough |
| 13:00 | | | | Stadium: Lincoln Road |

== Second round ==
The draw for the second round took place on 26 October 2026. 23 matches were played on 14 and 15 November 2026, with one match to be rearranged and confirmed.

| 14 November 2026 | Dulwich Hamlet (4) | 4–1 | Portishead Town (5) | East Dulwich |
| 15:00 | Roberts 18', 61'; Emmerson 69'; Heria 75' | Report | Jones 10' | Stadium: Champion Hill; Attendance: 1,562 |

| 15 November 2026 | Norwich City (3) | 2–1 | AFC Bournemouth (3) | Norwich |
| 12:00 | Daviss 90+1'; Kennard 90+5' | Report | Meadows-Tuson 39' | Stadium: The Nest; Attendance: 193 |

| 15 November 2026 | Derby County (3) | 7–0 | Bolton Wanderers (5) | Mickleover |
| 13:00 | O'Connor 5', 13'; Sharrocks 34'; Ashton 50'; Green 55'; Donnison 67'; Russell 87' | Report | | Stadium: Station Road; Attendance: 366 |

| 15 November 2026 | Loughborough Lightning (3) | 3–2 | i2i International (5) | Loughborough |
| 13:00 | Spillman 39', 59', 85' | Report | Omisore 27'; Corder 57' | Stadium: Loughborough University Stadium |

| 15 November 2026 | Thornaby (4) | 2–2 (2–4 p) | Crewe Alexandra (5) | Stockton-on-Tees |
| 13:00 | Knowles 44'; Curle 90+2' (pen.) | Report | 20', 54' | Stadium: Teesdale Park; Attendance: 241 |

| 15 November 2026 | Stoke City (3) | 6–1 | Liverpool Feds (3) | Stone |
| 13:00 | Priestley 4', 47'; Clarke 56'; Stamps 58'; Cook 71'; Kivel 87' | Report | Brady 80' | Stadium: Wellbeing Park; Attendance: 139 |

| 15 November 2026 | SJR Worksop (5) | 0–11 | Halifax (4) | Worksop |
| 13:00 | | Report | Renwick 4', 27', 33', 56', 65'; Crompton 14', 24', 76'; Limbert 17'; Settle 38'; Hammond 53' | Stadium: Rockware Stadium; Attendance: 410 |

| 15 November 2026 | Moneyfields (4) | 5–1 | Bristol Rovers (4) | Portsmouth |
| 13:00 | Venditto 14', 90+3'; Milner 39'; Tonks 48'; Barnett 87' | Report | Trinci 20' | Stadium: John Jenkins Stadium; Attendance: 120 |

| 15 November 2026 | Exeter City (3) | 2–5 | Portsmouth (3) | Willand |
| 13:00 | Whitmore 5'; Sara 64' (pen.) | Report | Freeland 8', 62'; Beattie 59'; Suttie 74'; Wilding 77' | Stadium: Silver Street; Referee: Andrew Heapy |

| 15 November 2026 | Marine Academy Plymouth (4) | 1–3 | Brentford (5) | Ivybridge |
| 13:00 | Blight 75' | Report | Harris-Walters 80'; Sangha 30', 65' | Stadium: Erme Valley; Attendance: 187 |

| 15 November 2026 | Milton Keynes Dons (4) | 2–2 (3–2 p) | Chatham Town (4) | Bletchley |
| 13:00 | Carnevale 37'; Day 71' | Report | Charles 40', 69' | Stadium: Stadium MK; Attendance: 341 |

| 15 November 2026 | Leeds United (4) | 2–0 | Norton & Stockton Ancients (4) | Garforth |
| 14:00 | Greene 73'; Sanderson 90+6' | Report | | Stadium: Wheatley Park; Attendance: 218; Referee: Leigh Gell |

| 15 November 2026 | Durham Cestria (4) | 1–6 | Middlesbrough (3) | Shildon |
| 14:00 | Mathias 60' | Report | Watt 5'; Turnbull 12', 65'; Boyes 56'; Boothroyd 70'; Skelton 88' | Stadium: Dean Street; Attendance: 127 |

| 15 November 2026 | Kidderminster Harriers (4) | 1–5 | Chester-le-Street Town (4) | Droitwich Spa |
| 14:00 | Hill 20' | Report | Jackson 18'; Ashton 51', 53', 90+1'; Hockaday 80' | Stadium: King George V Ground |

| 15 November 2026 | Notts County (4) | 1–2 | Mancunian Unity (5) | Eastwood |
| 14:00 | Barnes 5' | Report | Kershaw 4'; Taylor 20' | Stadium: Coronation Park |

| 15 November 2026 | Boldmere St. Michaels (3) | 1–3 | Stockport County (4) | Boldmere |
| 14:00 | Clark 90+5' | Report | Bradshaw 12', 29'; Fisher 83' | Stadium: Boldmere Community Stadium |

| 15 November 2026 | Gwalia United (4) | 0–4 | Oxford United (3) | Pontypridd |
| 14:00 | | Report | Thompson 36'; Richardson 84'; Manders 73', 90' | Stadium: USW Sport Park; Attendance: 286 |

| 15 November 2026 | Real Bedford (3) | 2–5 | Fulham (3) | Bedford |
| 14:00 | Head 55' (pen.); Wood 80' | Report | Lister 2', 4', 15'; Dungate 43'; Olds 89' | Stadium: McMullen Park |

| 15 November 2026 | Keynsham Town (4) | 3–1 | Millwall Lionesses (5) | Keynsham |
| 14:00 | 27', 30', 61' | Report | Madamombe 60' | Stadium: Crown Field |

| 15 November 2026 | Maidenhead United (4) | 0–5 | AFC Wimbledon (3) | Maidenhead |
| 14:00 | | Report | Hotston 19', 39' (pen.); Purchase 68', 76', 90+1' | Stadium: York Road; Attendance: 485 |

| 15 November 2026 | Bridgwater United (4) | 1–2 | Lewes (3) | Bridgwater |
| 14:00 | Jarvis 14' (pen.) | Report | Jones 52'; Johnson 90+3' | Stadium: Fairfax Park |

| 15 November 2026 | Chesterfield (4) | 1–2 | Leafield Athletic (4) | Mansfield Woodhouse |
| 15:00 | Nowell 47' | Report | Qose 40'; Horgan 42' | Stadium: Debdale Park Sports Club |

| 15 November 2026 | Barking (5) | 1–4 | Cambridge United (4) | Dagenham |
| 15:00 | Harvey 88' | Report | Bennett 16'; Jeffery 50', 72'; Bell 87' | Stadium: Lawtech Stadium |

| 29 November 2026 | Peterborough United (3) | v | Rugby Borough (3) |
| 13:00 |

== Third round ==
The draw for the third round took place on 16 November 2026 and will include the introduction of 12 teams from the second–tier Women's Super League 2. 18 matches will be played on 13 December 2026.

| 13 December 2026 | Norwich City (3) | v | Bristol City (2) | Norwich |
| 12:00 | | | | Stadium: The Nest |

| 13 December 2026 | Sheffield United (2) | v | Burnley (2) |
| 13:00 |

| 13 December 2026 | Nottingham Forest (2) | v | Sunderland (2) | West Bridgford |
| 13:00 | | | | Stadium: City Ground |

| 13 December 2026 | Leafield Athletic (4) | v | Peterborough United (3) / Rugby Borough (3) |
| 13:00 |

| 13 December 2026 | Durham (2) | v | Stoke City (3) | Maiden Castle |
| 13:00 | | | | Stadium: Durham |

| 13 December 2026 | Derby County (3) | v | Leeds United (4) | Mickleover |
| 13:00 | | | | Stadium: The Vibrant Doors Arena |

| 13 December 2026 | Chester-le-Street Town (4) | v | Halifax (4) | Chester-le-Street |
| 13:00 | | | | Stadium: Moor Park |

| 13 December 2026 | Stockport County (4) | v | Loughborough Lightning (3) |
| 13:00 |

| 13 December 2026 | Mancunian Unity (5) | v | Newcastle United (2) | Chadderton |
| 13:00 | | | | Stadium: Emplas CN Stadium |

| 13 December 2026 | Ipswich Town (2) | v | Southampton (2) | Colchester |
| 13:00 | | | | Stadium: Colchester Community Stadium |

| 13 December 2026 | Dulwich Hamlet (4) | v | Moneyfields (4) | East Dulwich |
| 13:00 | | | | Stadium: Champion Hill |

| 13 December 2026 | Middlesbrough (3) | v | Crewe Alexandra (5) | Stockton-on-Tees |
| 14:00 | | | | Stadium: Bishopton Road West |

| 13 December 2026 | AFC Wimbledon (3) | v | Lewes (3) | Wimbledon |
| 14:00 | | | | Stadium: Plough Lane |

| 13 December 2026 | Fulham (3) | v | Watford (2) |
| 14:00 |

| 13 December 2026 | Portsmouth (3) | v | Milton Keynes Dons (4) | Portsmouth |
| 14:00 | | | | Stadium: Fratton Park |

| 13 December 2026 | Oxford United (3) | v | Keynsham Town (4) | Oxford |
| 14:00 | | | | Stadium: The MGroup Stadium |

| 13 December 2026 | Wolverhampton Wanderers (2) | v | Cambridge United (4) | Wellington |
| 14:00 | | | | Stadium: New Bucks Head |

| 13 December 2026 | Brentford (5) | v | Leicester City (2) | West Drayton |
| 14:00 | | | | Stadium: Honeycroft |

== Fourth round ==
The draw for the fourth round will take place on TBD December 2026 and will include the introduction of 14 teams from the first–tier Women's Super League. It is the final round to introduce new teams. TBD matches will be played on 17 January 2027.

== Fifth round ==
The draw for the fifth round will take place on TBD January 2026. Eight matches will be played on 21 February 2026.

== Quarter-finals ==
The draw for the quarter-finals will take place on TBD February 2026. Four matches will be played on 21 March 2027.

== Semi-finals ==
The draw for the semi-finals will take place on TBD April 2026. Two matches will be played on 11 April 2027.

== Final ==
The final will be played at Wembley Stadium on 15 May 2027.

== Television rights ==
| Round | Date | Teams | Kick-off | Channels |
|---|---|---|---|---|
| First round | 25 October 2026 | Exeter City v Hashtag United | 12:00 | TNT Sports 1 |
| Second round | 14 November 2026 | Dulwich Hamlet v Portishead | 15:00 | TNT Sports 1 and HBO Max |

== See also ==
- 2026–27 WSL Players Cup
