= Sheffield & Hallamshire Women & Girls League =

- Country: England
- Number of clubs: 54; 12 (Division One); 12 (Division Two); 12 (Division Three); 9 (Division Four); 9 (Division Five)
- Level on pyramid: 7 - 11
- Promotion to: Level 6 North East Regional Women's League; East Midlands Regional Women's League
- Domestic cup(s): National; Women's FA Cup; League; League Cup
- Current champions: Division One; Rossington Main Ladies; Division Two; Chesterfield Ladies U23; Division Three; SJR Worksop Women reserves Division Four; Wickersley Youth Ladies
- Website: FA Full-time site

The Sheffield & Hallamshire Women & Girls League is a women's association football league in England run by the Sheffield & Hallamshire FA.

The league operates at levels 7 to 10 of the women's league pyramid, and promotes to Division One of both the North East Regional Women's Football League and East Midlands Regional Women's Football League.

== Current member clubs (2026–27) ==
=== Division One ===
Club	Home ground	2025–26 position
Barnsley Ladies	Oakwell (pitch 2), Barnsley	Div Two, 1st
Barnsley Women's reserves	Forge Parkside Centre, Hoyland Common	4th
Brodsworth Main Women	Miners Welfare Ground, Brodsworth	Div Two, 2nd
Dinnington Town Ladies	Laughton Road, Dinnington	7th
Frickley Athletic Women	Westfield Lane, South Elmsall	5th
Handsworth Ladies development	Olivers Mount, Handsworth	9th
Millmoor Juniors Ladies	Grange Park, Kimberworth	NERWL Div One South, 10th
Oughtibridge War Memorial Ladies	War Memorial Sports Ground, Oughtibridge	8th
Rotherham United Women U23s	Miners Welfare Ground, Swallownest	11th
Sheffield United Community Foundation	Silkstone Road, Frecheville	10th
Staveley Miners Welfare Ladies U23s	Miners Welfare Ground, Staveley	Div Two, 4th
Stocksbridge Park Steels Ladies	Bracken Moor, Stocksbridge	2nd

Location of clubs participating in the 2026–27 Sheffield & Hallamshire Women's League Division One

=== Division Two ===
Club	Home ground	2025–26 position
Brinsworth Whitehill Women	Phoenix Sports & Social Club, Brinsworth	3rd
Charnock Ridgeway Women	Herdings Park, Sheffield	Div Three, 2nd
Chesterfield Town Women	Holmebrook Valley Park, Cutthorpe	Div Three, 1st
Dearne & District Ladies	Kingsmark, Goldthorpe	10th
Kiveton Park Women	Hard Lane, Kiveton Park	Div One, 12th
Millmoor Juniors Ladies reserves	Grange Park, Kimberworth	11th
Parkgate Ladies	Roundwood Pavilion, Rawmarsh	New
Penistone Church Women	Church View Road, Penistone	9th
Rossington Main Ladies development	Station Pitch, Rossington	7th
Sheffield Wednesday Ladies reserves	Jubilee Sports Club, Wadsley Bridge	5th
SJR Worksop Women development	Manton Sports Club, Worksop	6th
Socrates Ladies	The Hub, Thurcroft	8th

Location of clubs participating in the 2026–27 Sheffield & Hallamshire Women's League Division Two

=== Division Three ===
Club	Home ground	2025–26 position
Barnsley Women's U21s	Forge Parkside Centre, Hoyland Common	10th
Brampton United Ladies	Brampton Ellis Playing Fields, Wath-upon-Dearne	Div Four, 1st
Brinsworth Whitehill Women reserves	Phoenix Sports & Social Club, Brinsworth	New
Chancet Wood Women	Norfolk Park, Sheffield	New
Dronfield Town Ladies reserves	Stonelow, Dronfield	5th
Edenthorpe Ladies	Howard Pavilion, Edenthorpe	Div Two, 12th
Kiveton Park Women reserves	Hard Lane, Kiveton Park	8th
Maltby Juniors Ladies	Academy Extension Fields, Maltby	6th
Retford Ladies	Babworth Road, Retford	Div Four, 2nd
Sheffield Wednesday Ladies development	Bawtry Road, Tinsley	7th
Swallownest Miners Welfare	Miners Welfare Ground, Swallownest	4th
Wickersley Youth Ladies	Wickersey School, Wickersley	3rd

Location of clubs participating in the 2026–27 Sheffield & Hallamshire Women's League Division Three

=== Division Four ===
Club	Home ground	2025–26 position
Barlborough Ladies	Barlborough Country Park, Barlborough	4th
Brodsworth Main Women reserves	Miners Welfare Ground, Brodsworth	New
Courage Ladies	Langer Lane, Chesterfield	5th
Frickley Athletic Ladies reserves	Westfield Lane, Frickley	3rd
FURD Ladies	Meadowhead School, Sheffield	8th
New Lodge WMC Ladies	Rotherham Road, Barnsley	New
Scawthorpe Scorpions Ladies	Queens Drive, Bentley	Div Three, 9th
Sheffield Medics Women	Gosforth Fields, Dronfield	7th
West End Terriers Ladies	Outwood Academy, Hemsworth	6th

Location of clubs participating in the 2026–27 Sheffield & Hallamshire Women's League Division Four

=== Division Five ===
Club	Home ground	2025–26 position
AFC Pogmoor	Woodview, Barnsley	New
Aston Swallownest	Todwick Recreation Ground, Todwick	Div Four, 9th
Bramley Stingers	Flash Lane, Wickersley	New
Edenthorpe Ladies reserves	Howard Pavilion, Edenthorpe	New
Kinsley Ladies	Kinsley Boys Stadium, Kinsley	New
Retford Ladies reserves	Babworth Road, Retford	New
Rossington Women	Miners Welfare Ground, Rossington	New
Rotherham Town Ladies	Herringthorpe Stadium, Rotherham	Div Four, 10th
Treeton Terriers	Wales Recreation Ground, Wales	New

Location of clubs participating in the 2026–27 Sheffield & Hallamshire Women's League Division Five

== Champions ==
Season	Division One	Division Two	Division Three	Division Four
2005–06	Doncaster Rovers Belles 3rd XI			
2006–07	Wickersley Ladies			
2007–08				
2008–09	Sheffield United Ladies			
2009–10	Doncaster Rovers Belles 3rd XI	Chesterfield Ladies		
2010–11	Keepmoat Stadium Ladies	Sheffield Wednesday Ladies		
2011–12				
2012–13	Handsworth Ladies	Edlington Royals		
2013–14	Sheffield Wednesday Ladies reserves	Oughtibridge War Memorial Ladies		
2014–15	Oughtibridge War Memorial Ladies	Anston Ladies	Beighton Magpies Ladies	
2015–16	Sheffield Wednesday Ladies reserves	AFC Dronfield Ladies	Huddersfield Town Ladies 'A'	
2016–17	Beighton Magpies Ladies	Sheffield United Ladies reserves	Harworth Colliery Ladies	
2017–18	Barnsley Ladies reserves	Worksop Town Ladies		
2018–19	Doncaster Rovers Foundation Ladies	Oughtibridge War Memorial Ladies development		
2019–20	Season abandoned owing to COVID-19 pandemic			
2020–21	Season abandoned owing to COVID-19 pandemic			
2021–22	Harworth Colliery Ladies	Handsworth Ladies development	Rotherham United Women reserves	
2022–23	AFC Bentley Ladies	Penistone Church Ladies	Staveley Miners Welfare Women	
2023–24	Brunsmeer Athletic Women	Hemsworth Miners Welfare Ladies	Mexborough Athletic Ladies	Mind Over Matter Ladies
2024–25	Rossington Main Ladies	Chesterfield Ladies U23	SJR Worksop Women reserves	Wickersley Ladies
2025–26	Staveley Miners Welfare Ladies	Barnsley Ladies	Chesterfield Town Ladies	Brampton United Ladies

== League Cup ==
The league also runs a League Cup competition, which is open to all clubs in the league.

=== Finals ===
Season	Winner	Result	Runner-up	Venue
2019–20	Season abandoned owing to COVID-19 pandemic			
2020–21	Barnsley Ladies	3 – 1	Wakefield Trinity Ladies development	Shelley
2021–22	Handsworth Ladies development	2 – 0	Rotherham United Women reserves	Shelley
2022–23	Brunsmeer Athletic Women	3 – 1	AFC Bentley Ladies	Jubilee Sports
2023–24	Brunsmeer Athletic Women	3 – 2	AFC Bentley Ladies	Kiveton (Chapman Fields)
2024–25	Rossington Main Ladies	3 – 1	YP Women	Kiveton (Hard Lane)
2024–25	YP Women	2 – 1	Staveley Miners Welfare Women	Staveley

== See also ==
- Sheffield & Hallamshire Women's Challenge Cup
