= Frickley Athletic F.C. Women =

Frickley Athletic Women
- Full name: Frickley Athletic Football Club Women
- Founded: 2025
- Ground: Westfield Lane

Frickley Athletic Football Club Women, commonly referred to as Frickley Athletic unless distinguishing themselves from the men's team, is an English women's football club based in Frickley, West Yorkshire. The club currently play in the .

== History ==
The current women's section of Frickley Athletic F.C. was formed in 2024, entering the Sheffield & Hallamshire Women's League Division 4. The next season, they were admitted to Division 1, and in the summer of 2026 they were accepted as an entrant in the Women's FA Cup for the first time.

=== Season by season record ===
Season	Division	Position	Women's FA Cup	Notes
2024–25	Sheffield & Hallamshire Women's League Division Four	6th/9	-	
2025–26	Sheffield & Hallamshire Women's League Division One	5th/12	-	
2026–27	Sheffield & Hallamshire Women's League Division One	TBD	TBD	
