= Harworth Colliery F.C. Ladies =

Harworth Colliery Ladies
- Full name: Harworth Colliery Ladies Football Club
- League: North East Regional Women's Football League Division One South
- 2022–23: North East Regional Women's Football League Division One South, 9th of 12

Harworth Colliery Ladies Football Club is an English women's football club based in Bircotes, Nottinghamshire. The club currently play in the Sheffield & Hallamshire Women's League division one.

== History ==
=== Season by season record ===
Season	Division	Position	Women's FA Cup
2020–21	Sheffield & Hallamshire Women's League Division One		
