= Redcar Town Ladies F.C. =

- Full name: Redcar Town Ladies Football Club
- Nickname: Town Ladies
- Founded: 2013; 13 years ago
- Ground: Mo Mowlam Memorial Park, Redcar
- Chairman: Gary Wheatley
- Manager: Mike Kinnair
- League: 2nd of 12 in North East Northern Division
- 2024–25: 9th of 12 in North East Northern Division
Home colours	Away colours

Redcar Town Ladies Football Club is a women's football club based in Redcar, England.

Known locally as 'Town Ladies', the club's first team are currently members of the North East Regional Women's Football League Northern Division, the sixth tier of English Women's football, part of Redcar Town F.C. & affiliated with the North Riding Football Association

Enjoying a spell of success in the late 10's and early 20's, Redcar reached five consecutive North Riding County Cup finals, winning two as well as achieving back to back promotions in 2017/18 and 2018/19 to reach the North East Women's Premier League.

== First Team History ==
Redcar Town Ladies won the North Riding League in 2013/14 securing promotion to North East Northern Division where they recorded a respectable 6th in their first campaign securing 26 points.

However, the second season at that level proved to be more of a challenge with the team slipping to 8th in 2015/2016, second bottom, before falling to the foot of the table the following year and finding themselves subject to relegation in 2016/17.

The team bounced back in style under manager Lee Round's tutelage winning back to back promotions in 2017/18 and 2018/19 as well as consecutive North Riding Cups beating York City in the 2018 final and then Guisborough in 2019 to retain the title. The maiden triumph saw Town Ladies become the first team other than Middlesbrough or York to lift the trophy. Former England Youth international Jess Round scored 44 goals during the latter campaign to fire the team into the North East Prem.

The club posted respectable mid table finishes of 6th and 7th during the Covid disrupted seasons to establish themselves in the North East's Premier Division. The club reached a third consecutive county cup final but were defeated by York 2-4. The club progressed further than any other side in the 2020/21 edition of the competition before it was cancelled.

In 2021/22 the club went on to achieve its highest ever pyramid position finishing 3rd in the league with Round hitting 30 goals supported by young striker Mary Corbyn who netted an additional 16. A re-match in the North Riding Final saw Town lose 8-9 on penalties to York after drawing 1-1 at full-time. The club slipped back to seventh in 2022/23 but the goals and cup runs continued with Corbyn scoring 30 times and Round adding another 16 en route to another North Riding final where they faced Middlesbrough. Town Ladies led 2-0 at the York Community Stadium, before the Boro came from behind to win 3-2. A fantastic FA Cup run saw Town reach the first round proper for the first time in the club's history before bowing out to Leeds United in the second round, a run which drew praise from England International Beth Mead

The team started the 2023/24 season with an empathic 4-0 win over Hartlepool Pools Youth Ladies at home. However following the departure of long-time coach Lee Round mid season, the team would fail to pick up a second league victory until April where they beat Hartlepool United Women 3-0 at Mo Mowlam Park under the stewardship of Michelle Coleman. Town finished bottom of the North East Regional Women's Football League Premier Division in a transitional year and were relegated to the Northern Division.

For the 2024/25 season Marske United F.C. record appearance holder Mike Kinnair took the helm as manager. The team picked up its first home league win of the season in October 2024 against Hartlepool United while in January 2025 the team recorded their first away victory in over 18 months at Bishop Auckland. Further victories on the road followed at Consett and Gateshead saw Town Ladies collected three wins in four to move from the foot of the table, out of the relegation zone, and ultimately avoid relegation on the final day.

Town Ladies started the 2025/26 campaign strongly with an away victory at Whitehaven in the FA Cup First Qualifying Round, before back to back victories in the league against Berwick and Consett.

== Current squad ==
Up to Date as of 29/09/2025

Note: Flags indicate national team as defined under FIFA eligibility rules; some limited exceptions apply. Players may hold more than one non-FIFA nationality.

No.	Pos.	Nation	Player
—	GK	ENG	Ellie Randall
—	GK	ENG	Shaunna Pearson
—	DF	ENG	Heather Power (Captain)
—	DF	ENG	Alix Peoples
—	DF	ENG	Jasmin Kelly
—	DF	ENG	Maddison Wilkinson
—	DF	ENG	Grace Nevitt
—	DF	ENG	Megan Day
—	DF	ENG	Nicole Carne
—	DF	ENG	Paula Lowe
—	MF	ENG	Jodie Thorpe
—	MF	ENG	Jess Robinson
—	MF	ENG	Vicky Gunn

No.	Pos.	Nation	Player,
—	MF	ENG	Hannah Colvin
—	MF	ENG	Michelle Coleman
—	MF	ENG	Sophie Appleyard
—	MF	ENG	Zara Atkinson
—	MF	ENG	Tara Hill
—	MF	ENG	Maisy Dinsdale
—	FW	ENG	Lydia Maidens
—	FW	ENG	Katie Rowland (Vice Captain)
—	FW	ENG	Olivia Lloyd Williams
—	FW	ENG	Tiana Hill
—	FW	ENG	Aimee Harvey
—	FW	ENG	Abi Foy
—	FW	ENG	Becca Hunter

== Current staff ==
Correct as of 28/09/2025

Position	Name
Chairperson	(England) Gary Wheatley
Vice Chairperson	(England) Dennis Gargett
Club Treasurer	(England) Dan Thompson
Club Secretary	(England) Ian Enderwick
First-Team Manager	(England) Mike Kinnair
First Team Assistant Manager	(England) Michelle Coleman
First Team Assistant Manager	(England) Luke Richardson
First Team Coach & U16s Manager	(England) Paula Lowe

== Managers ==
- 2013-2017 Ian Best
- 2017-2017 Karen Boyle
- 2017-2024 Lee Round
- 2024-2024 Michelle Coleman
- 2024–Present Mike Kinnair

== Ground ==
The club currently play at the Mo Mowlam Memorial Park in Redcar.

== Reserve & Development Teams ==
Town Ladies entered a Reserves Team into the 2019/2020 North Riding Women's Premier League but the season was curtailed by COVID-19. When the league resumed the following season Town Ressies finished 2nd, three points behind league champions.

The following season the team won the title outright in 2021/22 before disbanding. A few seasons later Town would form a development side, initially competing the North Riding Women's Prem in 2023/24 and then in the newly formed North Riding Women's D1 the following season.

Former Middlesbrough F.C. Women's midfielder Jackie Freeman drew national attention playing for the Development team at the age of 60, making her the oldest active player in the English Women's pyramid

== Notable players ==
- Jess Round (England U17s, Newcastle & Durham)
- Mary Corbyn (Sunderland A.F.C. Women)

== Seasons ==
Season	League										FA Cup	North Riding Cup	Other		Top Scorer(s) (Note: League goals only.)	
Season	Division (tier)	Pld	W	D	L	GF	GA	GD	Pts	Pos	FA Cup	North Riding Cup	Competition	Res	Player(s)	Goals
2013-14	North Riding Prem (7)	—	—	—	—	—	—	—	—	1st Promoted	No Entry			—	—	—
2014-15	North East Northern (6)	20	8	2	10	36	52	-16	26	6th	No Entry	—	—	—	Emily Fewster	12
2015-16	North East Northern (6)	16	3	4	9	28	47	-19	4*	8th	Q2	—	—	—	Beth Enderwick	4
2016-17	North East Northern (6)	16	1	2	13	12	68	-56	2*	9th Relegated	No Entry	—	—	—	Gemma Craddy	6
2017-18	North Riding Prem (7)	—	—	—	—	—	—	—	—	1st Promoted	Q2	Winners			—	—
2018-19	North East Northern (6)	18	17	1	0	84	17	67	52	1st Promoted	Q3	Winners			Jess Round	44
2019-20	North East Prem (5)	7	2	1	4	10	13	-3	7	7th	Q2	Runners-Up	—	—	Jess Round	14
2020-21	North East Prem (5)	6	2	1	3	18	18	0	7	6th	Q1	Cancelled Due To COVID-19	—	—	Jess Round	11
2021-22	North East Prem (5)	20	12	2	6	42	37	5	38	3rd	Q3	Runners-Up	—	—	Jess Round	30
2022-23	North East Prem (5)	18	7	2	9	52	47	5	23	7th	R2	Runners-Up	—	—	Mary Corbyn	32
2023-24	North East Prem (5)	22	2	1	19	25	69	-44	1*	12th Relegated	Q3	R2	—	—	Jess Round	11
2024-25	North East Northern (6)	22	6	5	11	26	46	-10	23	9th	Q1	QF	—		Tiana Hill	10
2025-26	North East Northern (6)	20	8	0	12	24	47	-23	24	7th	Q2	-	—		Tiana Hill	12

== First Team Honours ==
- North Riding Women's Cup
  - 2x Winners: 2017/18 2018/2019
  - Runners-up: 2019/2020, 2021/22, 2022/23
- North East Regional Women's Football League Division One North
  - Champions: 2018/2019
- North Riding Women's League Premier Division
  - 2x Champions: 2013/2014, 2017/2018

== Reserves Team Honours ==
- North Riding Women's League Premier Division
  - Champions: 2021/22
  - Runners-Up: 2020/21
