= Wakefield A.F.C. Women =

- Full name: Wakefield A.F.C. Women
- Nickname(s): The Miners
- Founded: 2019
- Ground: MDC Stadium, Fitzwilliam, Wakefield
- Capacity: 1,000 (100 seated)
- Manager: Jordan Hartley
- League: North East Regional Women’s Football League Southern
- 2019/20: 2nd

Wakefield A.F.C. Women were an English women's football club based in Wakefield, West Yorkshire. The club last played in the North East Regional Women's Football League Southern Division and the Women's FA Cup. In July 2021, a partnership was agreed between Wakefield A.F.C. and Wakefield Trinity Ladies FC for the 2021/22 season. Following the acquisition of Wakefield A.F.C. by VO2 Capital in November 2021, it was announced that the Trinity Ladies would merge with the women's operation at Wakefield A.F.C. The women's team folded in 2024.
