= Kiveton Park F.C. Women =

Kiveton Park Women
- Full name: Kiveton Park Football Club Women
- Founded: 2019
- Ground: Hard Lane
- Chairman: Chris Nelson
- Manager: Gordon Johnson
- League: Sheffield & Hallamshire Women's League Division One
- 2024-25: North East Regional Women's Football League Division One South, 9th of 11 (relegated)
Home colours

Kiveton Park Football Club Women, commonly referred to as Kiveton Park unless distinguishing themselves from the men's team, is an English women's football club based in Kiveton Park, South Yorkshire. The club currently play in the Sheffield & Hallamshire Women's League Division One.

== History ==
The women's section of Kiveton Park F.C. was formed in 2019, and entered a team into the Sheffield & Hallamshire Women's League Division Two for its first season.

The team's first two campaigns were cut short by the COVID-19 pandemic, but in 2021–22 they earned promotion to Division One after finishing in second place.

In 2023, they entered the Women's FA Cup for the first time, and in their first game in the competition they beat Sheffield Wednesday Ladies 3-0. After finishing as S&HWL Division One runners-up at the end of the 2023–24 season, the team was promoted to the North East Regional League Division One South, but they suffered back-to-back relegations over the following two seasons.

=== Season by season record ===
Season	Division	Position	Women's FA Cup	Notes
2019–20	Sheffield & Hallamshire Women's League Division Two	–	–	Season abandoned due to COVID-19 pandemic
2020–21	Sheffield & Hallamshire Women's League Division Two	–	–	Season abandoned due to COVID-19 pandemic
2021–22	Sheffield & Hallamshire Women's League Division Two	2nd/11	–	Promoted
2022–23	Sheffield & Hallamshire Women's League Division One	3rd/9	–	
2023–24	Sheffield & Hallamshire Women's League Division One	2nd/12	2QR	
2024–25	North East Regional Women's League Division One South	9th/10	1QR	Relegated
2025–26	Sheffield & Hallamshire Women's League Division One	12th/12	–	Relegated
2026–27	Sheffield & Hallamshire Women's League Division Two		–	
