= Sheffield United Community Foundation F.C. Women =

Sheffield United Community Foundation Ladies
- Full name: Sheffield United Community Foundation Ladies Football Club
- Website: https://www.Sheffield United Community Foundationfcladies.org.uk/default.aspx

Sheffield United Community Foundation Football Club Ladies is an English Women's Football club based in Sheffield, South Yorkshire, England. The club currently plays in the North East Regional Women's Football League Division One South, the sixth tier of the English women's football league system.

== History ==
=== Season-by-season record ===
Season	Division	Level	Position	Women's FA Cup	Notes
2018–19	Sheffield & Hallamshire Women's League Division One	7	9th/10	-	
2019–20	Sheffield & Hallamshire Women's League Division One	7	-	-	Season abandoned due to COVID-19 pandemic
2020–21	Sheffield & Hallamshire Women's League Division One	7	-	-	Season abandoned due to COVID-19 pandemic
2021–22	Sheffield & Hallamshire Women's League Division One	7	4th/8	-	
2022–23	North East Regional League Division One South	6	8th/12	1QR	
2023–24	North East Regional League Division One South	6	TBD	-	
Season	Division	Level	Position	FA Women's Cup	Notes
Source: Football Association
