= Brunsmeer Athletic F.C. Women =

Brunsmeer Athletic Women
- Full name: Brunsmeer Athletic Football Club Women
- Founded: 2022
- Ground: Hillsborough College
- 2024-25: North East Regional Women's Football League Division One South , 1st of 11 (promoted)

Brunsmeer Athletic Football Club Women was an English women's football club based in Dore, South Yorkshire. On 21 July 2026, the club folded after being forced to play in the North East Regional Women's League for the 2026-27 season instead of the East Midlands League.

== History ==
The women's section of Brunsmeer Athletic was formed in 2022, and entered a team into the Sheffield & Hallamshire Women's League Division One for its first season. In 2023, they entered the Women's FA Cup for the first time, and in their first game in the competition they beat Gainsborough Trinity Ladies 5–3.

In 2026, after being forced by the The Football Association to play in the North East Regional Women's League for the new season, the club folded.

=== Season by season record ===
Season	Division	Position	Women's FA Cup	Notes
2022–23	Sheffield & Hallamshire Women's League Division One	4th/9	–	
2023–24	Sheffield & Hallamshire Women's League Division One	1st/12		

== Honours ==
=== League ===
- Sheffield & Hallamshire Women's League Division 1
  - Champions: 2023–24

=== Cup ===
- Sheffield & Hallamshire Women's League Cup
  - 2023–24
