= Oughtibridge War Memorial F.C. Women =

Oughtibridge War Memorial Women
- Full name: Oughtibridge War Memorial Women Football Club
- Ground: Oughtibridge War Memorial Recreation Ground, Oughtibridge
- League: North East Regional Women's Football League Division One South
- 2024-25: North East Regional Women's Football League Division One South, 10th of 11

Oughtibridge War Memorial Women Football Club is an English women's football club based in Oughtibridge, Sheffield, South Yorkshire. The club currently plays in the North East Regional Women's Football League Division One South.

== History ==
=== Season by season record ===
Season	Division	Position	Women's FA Cup
2013–14	Sheffield & Hallamshire Women's County League Division Two	1st/8	-
2014–15	Sheffield & Hallamshire Women's County League Division One	1st/6	-
2015–16	North East Regional League Division One South	1st/11	3rd Qualifying Round
2016–17	North East Regional League Premier Division	8th/11	-
2017–18	East Midlands Regional League Premier Division	2nd/12	
2018–19	East Midlands Regional League Premier Division	3rd/11	2nd Qualifying Round
2019–20	East Midlands Regional League Premier Division	-	1st Qualifying Round
2020–21	East Midlands Regional League Premier Division	-	Extra Preliminary Round
2021–22	East Midlands Regional League Premier Division	5th/10	2nd Qualifying Round
2022–23	East Midlands Regional League Premier Division	8th/9	1st Round Proper
2024–25	North East Regional League Division One South	10th/11	
