= Stocksbridge Park Steels F.C. Ladies =

Stocksbridge Park Steels Women
- Full name: Stocksbridge Park Steels Football Club Women
- Founded: 2024
- Ground: Bracken Moor
- League: Sheffield & Hallamshire Women's League Division One
- 2024-25: Sheffield & Hallamshire Women's Football League Division One, 7th of 9

Stocksbridge Park Steels Football Club Women, commonly referred to as Stocksbridge Park Steels unless distinguishing themselves from the men's team, is an English women's football club based in Stocksbridge, South Yorkshire. The club currently play in the Sheffield & Hallamshire Women's League Division One.

== History ==
The women's section of Stocksbridge Park Steels F.C. was formed in 2024, having moved from Mosborough Ladies, who had entered the Sheffield & Hallamshire Women's League in 2020 and won promotion to the First Division in 2023.

They were accepted into the Women's FA Cup for the 2025/26 season, and beat Cherry Burton 8-0 in the Preliminary Round.

=== Season by season record ===
Season	Division	Position	Women's FA Cup	Notes
2024–25	Sheffield & Hallamshire Women's League Division One	7th/9	-	
2025–26	Sheffield & Hallamshire Women's League Division One		TBD	
