= Brodsworth Main F.C. Women =

Brodsworth Main Women
- Full name: Brodsworth Main Football Club Women
- Founded: 2025
- Ground: Welfare Ground

Brodsworth Main Football Club Women, commonly referred to as Brodsworth Main unless distinguishing themselves from the men's team, is an English women's football club based in Brodsworthy, South Yorkshire. The club currently play in the .

== History ==
The current women's section of Brodsworth Main F.C. was formed in 2024, entering the Sheffield & Hallamshire Women's League Division 3. The next season, they were admitted to Division 2, and in the summer of 2026 they were accepted as an entrant in the Women's FA Cup for the first time after winning promotion to Division 1.

=== Season by season record ===
Season	Division	Position	Women's FA Cup	Notes
2024–25	Sheffield & Hallamshire Women's League Division Three	7th/10	-	
2025–26	Sheffield & Hallamshire Women's League Division Two	2nd/12	-	
2026–27	Sheffield & Hallamshire Women's League Division One	TBD	TBD	
