= Hepworth United F.C. Ladies =

Hepworth United Ladies
- Full name: Hepworth United Ladies Football Club
- Ground: Far Lane
- League: West Riding County Women's League Division Two
- 2024-25: West Riding County Women's League Division One, 10th of 10 (relegated)

Hepworth United Ladies Football Club is an English women's football club based in Hepworth, West Yorkshire. The club currently play in the North East Regional Women's League.

In 2015, Hepworth United secured planning permission to build a new clubhouse. The old clubhouse had shared facilities for women and men, resulting in long waits for post-match showers. In the fall of that year, the women's team embarked on its first season in the Premier Division of the West Riding County Women's Football League.

== History ==
=== Season by season record ===
| Season | Division | Position | Women's FA Cup |
|---|---|---|---|
| 2017–18 | West Riding County Women's League Premier Division One | 2nd/9 | - |
| 2018–19 | West Riding County Women's League Premier Division One | 1st/10 | Preliminary Round |
| 2019–20 | North East Regional Women's League Division One South | | First Qualifying Round |
| 2020–21 | North East Regional Women's League Division One South | | Extra Preliminary Round |
