= Rotherham United F.C. Women =

Rotherham United Women
- Full name: Rotherham United Women Football Club
- Nickname: The Millers
- Founded: 1969 (as Kilnhurst Shooting Stars)
- Ground: Roundwood Sports Complex, Rawmarsh
- Capacity: 1,000 (300 seated)
- Chairman: Jamie Noble
- Manager: Pete Jarvis
- League: East Midlands Regional Women's Football League Premier Division
- 2024–25: East Midlands Regional Women's Football League Premier Division, 3rd of 9

Rotherham United Women Football Club is an English women's football club based in Rotherham, South Yorkshire. The club currently play in the East Midlands Regional Women's Football League Premier Division.

== History ==
The club was formed in 1969 as Kilnhurst Shooting Stars. The club has played in the Women's FA Cup on several occasions.

With Rotherham United being days away from closure due to financial reasons, it was announced on 23 June 2026 that the club had been purchased by Phil Smith and Scott Thorpe who provided the financial support necessary to preserve the club.

=== Season by season record ===
Season	Division	Level	Position	FA Women's Cup	Notes
2006–07	Midland Combination	4	1st/12	3R	League champions, promoted
2007–08	FA WPL Division One North	3	9th/12	4R	
2008–09	FA WPL Division One North	3	12th/12	4R	Relegated
2009–10	Midland Combination	4	4th/12	2R	
2010–11	Midland Combination	4	2nd/12	2R	Promoted
2011–12	FA WPL Division One North	3	9th/10	3R	Relegated
2012–13	Midland Combination	4	5th/11	3QR	
2013–14	Midland Combination	4	3rd/11	3QR	
2014–15	FA WPL Division One Midland	4	6th/12	1R	
2015–16	FA WPL Division One Midland	4	9th/12	3QR	
2016-17	FA WPL Division One Midland	4	11th/12	3QR	
2017-18	FA WPL Division One Midland	4	11th/12	3QR	Relegated
2018-19	North East Regional Premier Division	5	9th/10	1QR	
2019-20	East Midlands Regional Premier Division	5	-	PR	Season abandoned due to COVID-19 pandemic
2020-21	East Midlands Regional Premier Division	5	-	PR	Season abandoned due to COVID-19 pandemic
2021-22	East Midlands Regional Premier Division	5	7th/10	3QR	
2022-23	East Midlands Regional Premier Division	5	6th/9	2QR	
Season	Division	Level	Position	FA Women's Cup	Notes
Source: the Football Association

== Stadium ==
Rotherham United Ladies play at Roundwood Sports Complex in Rawmarsh, the home of Parkgate F.C.

== Honours ==
- Midland Combination Women's Football League:
  - Winners (1): 2006–07
