= Barnsley F.C. Women =

Barnsley
- Full name: Barnsley Football Club Women
- Nickname(s): The Reds
- Founded: 2020; 5 years ago
- Ground: Oakwell Training Ground
- Capacity: 1,000
- Manager: Jessica Horsley
- League: FA Women's National League Division One North
- 2024–25: FA Women's National League Division One North, 8th of 12
- Website: https://www.barnsleyfc.co.uk/
| Home colours | Away colours | Third colours |

Barnsley Football Club Women is an English women's football club affiliated with Barnsley F.C. and based in Barnsley, South Yorkshire, England. The club currently play in the fifth tier of English women's football.

== History ==
A women's football club connected to Barnsley F.C. had run since the 1980s, but severed ties with the men's team in 2018 to become Barnsley W.F.C. Affiliated with the men's club, the new ladies team was announced on 18 June 2020, and were placed in the Sheffield & Hallamshire Division One for their inaugural season. The season was abandoned due to the COVID-19 pandemic, but the club were granted promotion to the North East Regional Division One South.

Barnsley won the 2022–23 North East Regional Division One South, and were promoted to the North East Regional Premier Division. In May 2023, Barnsley further integrated the club, including a name change to Barnsley Football Club Women. The club achieved successive promotions after winning the 2023–24 North East Regional Premier Division, and were promoted to the FA National League.

On 4th June 2025 it was announced the team would be withdrawing from the FA Women’s National League ahead of the 25/26 season as the pitch facilities did not meet FA criteria for the fourth tier of the Women’s game and it was not financially or logistically possible to move to another venue.

== Players ==
=== Current squad ===
As of 12 May 2024.

Note: Flags indicate national team as defined under FIFA eligibility rules; some limited exceptions apply. Players may hold more than one non-FIFA nationality.

| No. | Pos. | Nation | Player |
|---|---|---|---|
| — | GK | (England) ENG | Ashleigh Ridsdel-Harrison |
| — | DF | (England) ENG | Bethany Ayrton |
| — | DF | (England) ENG | Louisa Barraclough |
| — | DF | (England) ENG | Macy Lunn |
| — | DF | (England) ENG | Stephanie Rigby |
| — | DF | (England) ENG | Melissa Turton-Burrell |
| — | DF | (England) ENG | Rebecca Wilson |
| — | DF | (England) ENG | Georgina Wilson-Roberts |
| — | MF | (England) ENG | Kim Brown |
| — | MF | (England) ENG | Betty Cheetham |
| — | MF | (England) ENG | Victoria Chincharo |
| — | MF | (England) ENG | Charley Evans (captain) |

| No. | Pos. | Nation | Player |
|---|---|---|---|
| — | MF | (England) ENG | Becky Fevers |
| — | MF | (England) ENG | Eliza Holland |
| — | MF | (England) ENG | Phoebe Lodge |
| — | MF | (England) ENG | Colby Marsh |
| — | MF | (England) ENG | Eden Schofield |
| — | MF | (England) ENG | Nicole Shaw |
| — | FW | (England) ENG | Amy Dawson |
| — | FW | (England) ENG | Madison Foye |
| — | FW | (England) ENG | Lynn Goodman |
| — | FW | (England) ENG | Jodie Gregory |
| — | MF | (England) ENG | Kirstie Nicholls |

== Seasons ==
| Season | Division | Level | Position | FA Cup | Notes |
|---|---|---|---|---|---|
| 2020–21 | Sheffield & Hallamshire Division One | 7 | 1st/11 | - | Season abandoned due to COVID-19 pandemic, promoted |
| 2021–22 | North East Regional Division One South | 6 | 4th/9 | - | |
| 2022–23 | North East Regional Division One South | 6 | 1st/12 | - | League champions, promoted |
| 2023–24 | North East Regional Premier Division | 5 | 1st/12 | - | League champions, promoted |
Source: Football Association

== Honours and achievements ==
League

- North East Regional Division One South (level 6)
  - Champions: 2022–23
- North East Regional Premier Division (level 5)
  - Champions: 2023–24
