= SJR Worksop F.C. Women =

SJR Worksop
- Full name: SJR Worksop Women Football Club
- Founded: 2020
- Ground: QTC ROCKWARE STADIUM, Worksop
- League: East Midlands Regional Women's Football League Premier Division
- 2024–25: East Midlands Regional Women's Football League Premier Division, 6th of 9

SJR Worksop Women Football Club is an English women's football club based in Worksop, Nottinghamshire. The club currently play in the Rockware Glass Sports and Social Club.

The club was formed as Worksop Town Ladies in 2015, but changed their name in 2020 after Worksop Town threatened to charge them £350'a match to play on their new 3G Under the SJR banner they've gone from strength to strength. Lee Scott was appointed manager in 2022 and within 2 seasons they went from Relegation fighters to league champions. They now play at Step 5 and have become one of the biggest clubs in the Sheffield & Hallamshire FA with a Development Team currently playing in Sheffield & District Division 3.

== History ==
=== Season by season record ===
Season	Division	Position	Women's FA Cup	Notes
Formed as Worksop Town Ladies
2015–16	Sheffield & Hallamshire Women's County League Division Two	5th/8	-	
2016–17	Sheffield & Hallamshire Women's County League Division Two	4th/9	-	
2017–18	Sheffield & Hallamshire Women's County League Division Two	1st/13	-	
2018–19	Sheffield & Hallamshire Women's League Division One	3rd/10	-	
2019–20	East Midlands Regional Women's League Division One North	-	Preliminary Round	League season abandoned
Changed name to St. Joseph's Rockware of Worksop
2020–21	East Midlands Regional Women's League Division One North		Preliminary Round	League season abandoned
2021–22	East Midlands Regional Women's League Division One North	5th/9	2QR	
2022–23	East Midlands Regional Women's League Division One North	7th/9	2QR	
2023–24	East Midlands Regional Women's League Division One North	1st/9	3QR	
