= Handsworth F.C. Ladies =

Handsworth Ladies
- Full name: Handsworth Ladies Football Club
- Nickname: The Ambers
- Founded: 1999
- Ground: Olivers Mount, Handsworth
- League: North East Regional Women's Football League Division One South
- 2024-25: North East Regional Women's Football League Division One South, 3rd of 11

Handsworth Ladies Football Club is an English women's football club based in Handsworth, Sheffield, South Yorkshire. The club currently play in the North East Regional Women's Football League Division One South.

== History ==
=== Season by season record ===
Season	Division	Position	Women's FA Cup	Notes
2012–13	Sheffield & Hallamshire Women's County League Division One	1st/7		
2013–14	North East Regional League Division One South	10th/10		
2014–15	Sheffield & Hallamshire Women's County League Division One	2nd/6		
2015–16	North East Regional League Division One South	11th/11	3rd Qualifying Round	
2016–17	Sheffield & Hallamshire Women's County League Division One	2nd/7		
2017–18	Sheffield & Hallamshire Women's County League Division One	10th/13		
2018–19	Sheffield & Hallamshire Women's League Division One	8th/10		
2019–20	Sheffield & Hallamshire Women's League Division One	-		Season abandoned
2020–21	Sheffield & Hallamshire Women's League Division One			
