= Huddersfield Town A.F.C. Women =

Coordinates: 53.606192°N 1.723151°W

Huddersfield Town Women
- Full name: Huddersfield Town Women Football Club
- Nickname: The Terriers
- Founded: 1988 (as Huddersfield Ladies FC)
- Ground: Storthes Hall, Huddersfield
- Capacity: 1000
- Chairman: Andy Brown
- Manager: Glen Preston
- League: FA Women's National League North
- 2025–26: FA Women's National League Division One North, 1st of 12 (promoted)
- Website: https://www.htwfc.co.uk/
Home colours	Away colours

Huddersfield Town A.F.C. Women is an English women's football club based in Huddersfield, West Yorkshire. The team play their homes matches at the Stafflex Arena. They compete in the FA Women's National League North and are affiliated to the professional men's club Huddersfield Town. They were previously known as Huddersfield Town Ladies, but changed to Huddersfield Town Women in 2019.

== History ==
An earlier women's football club, Huddersfield Atalanta Ladies F.C. was formed in 1920, playing against teams such as Dick, Kerr Ladies F.C., but was disbanded by 1925. It had played before crowds of up to 15,000 and raised large sums for charity. Players from Huddersfield Town F.C. had helped coach the players.

The modern club was formed in June 1988 as Huddersfield Ladies FC and joined the North-East Regional League Division 2 where, in their first season, they won the league Cup and were promoted to Division One as champions. Over the next few seasons there were signs that an exciting team was beginning to emerge with the 1992–93 season seeing Huddersfield finish 3rd place in the league and runners-up in the League Cup. At the end of 1992–93 season, Huddersfield Ladies merged with Huddersfield Town Juniors, becoming Huddersfield Town Ladies FC.

The next season (1993–94) saw Huddersfield complete the triple as they won the league championship, League Cup and Yorkshire Cup. They only lost once all season. The following season (1994–95) saw the first team retain the league championship, winning all 16 league matches and scoring 101 goals in the process. Eventually Huddersfield Town Ladies were relegated twice over successive seasons to the Yorkshire and Humberside Premier League. However, in the same period a lot of time and effort was invested in producing a new crop of talented young players from within their own junior ranks.

During the 2006–07 season the first team finished in 2nd place in the first season of the North East Regional Women's Premier Division.

In the 2010–11 season the club won the FA North East Regional Women's Premier Division, league and cup double and gained promotion to the FA Northern Women's Combination League under the management of Mickey Booth. After 14 years in charge, Mickey Booth decided to step down as first team manager at the end of the 2012–13 season.

Glen Preston was appointed as manager, alongside Ashley Vickers and Fraser Green for the 2013/14 season. Their first season in charge couldn't have gone much better, winning the FA Northern Women's Combination League by a margin of 8 points and gaining promotion to the FA Women's National League.

In their five seasons since promotion to the FA Women's National League Huddersfield Town Ladies finished 5th, 8th, 9th, 6th, and 4th respectively. Ashley Vickers became manager with Lee Harrison, Michael Emery, Stuart Amos and Jordan Wimpenny acting as his assistants.

=== Huddersfield Town Women Era ===
2019–20 Season

In the Summer of 2019 the club changed their name to Huddersfield Town Women FC.

In January 2020, Huddersfield Town Women announced that they would play their upcoming Women's FA Cup match against Ipswich Town F.C. Women at the John Smith's Stadium. This match attracted 1,115 supporters, which broke Huddersfield Town Women's current attendance record. Huddersfield lost the game 4–1. The 2019/20 season would later be declared 'null and void' by The FA due to the COVID-19 pandemic.

On 19 March, Huddersfield Town Women confirmed the departure of manager Ashley Vickers. Lee Harrison and Michael Emery also left their positions at the club. Jordan Wimpenny was confirmed as the new first team manager on 23 March.

2020–21 Season

The 2020–21 season saw Huddersfield Town rise to the top of the table before the season was suspended again in November 2020 due to the UK's second lockdown. Following a restart in December 2020, Huddersfield played only three more matches before the season was halted again in January 2021 after beating Liverpool Feds in the only Women's FA Cup match to be played.

On 13 February, the club announced on its website that they wouldn't be applying for promotion into the FA Women's Championship.

On 15 March The FA announced that the 2020/21 Women's National League season would be scrapped following discussions with clubs however the Women's FA Cup would continue. Once the season restarted, Huddersfield equalled their record as they progressed to the fifth round of the Women's FA Cup where they lost 6–0 to FA Women's Super League side Brighton & Hove Albion Women.

2021–22 Season

On 7 August, Jordan Wimpenny announced his departure from the club due to "personal reasons". His assistant, Marcus Wilkinson also left the club on 11 August. During this week, Steve Appleton was promoted to the manager role before being joined by development team coach, Mo Mouelihi a month later. Daniel Alogba joined the club in October.

Alison Bamforth was announced as the new club chair person on 28 August, succeeding David Mallin (who became club secretary).

On 10 November, the club parted company with first team manager Steve Appleton. Glen Preston returned back to the team for his second spell as manager on 15 November bringing with him former FC United of Manchester Women manager Kamran Hussain as a first team coach alongside the current Huddersfield coaching team.

On 3 December, the HTSA (Huddersfield Town Supporters Association) inducted Huddersfield Town Women player Kate Mallin into the Huddersfield Town Heritage Project Hall of Fame.

On 4 January, Huddersfield announced that they were set to play their Women's FA Cup fourth round tie against Everton F.C Women at the John Smith's Stadium. On 30 January Huddersfield would go on to break their highest attendance record, previously set in 2020, with 1,168 fans coming down to watch Huddersfield lose 4-0 to Everton F.C Women.

The First Round of 2021–22 Women's FA Cup saw Sir Tom Finney FC Ladies from the North West Women's Regional Football League (sixth-tier) against Huddersfield at the Stafflex Arena. The game finished 20-0 to Huddersfield Town. In the Second Round of the Women's FA Cup, Huddersfield were drawn away to FA Women's National League (third-tier) side Sheffield F.C. Ladies however the match was postponed due to Storm Arwen. The re-arranged fixture took place at the Stafflex Arena with Huddersfield winning 3-0. The Third Round of the competition was played on 12 December against FA Women's National League (third-tier) side Loughborough Lightning, with the Terriers winning 3-1. The Fourth round saw FA Women's Super League (first-tier) side Everton F.C Women face Huddersfield at the John Smith's Stadium on 30 January. Everton went through to the next round beating Huddersfield 4-0.

Huddersfield Town Women started their FA Women's National League Cup campaign with a 7-2 victory against fourth-tier Boldmere St. Michaels F.C. on 12 September during the FAWNL preliminary round. This win allowed Huddersfield Town to progress into the First Round of the FA Women's National League Cup where they faced third-tier Middlesbrough Women at home, winning 3-2. The next round saw Huddersfield facing fellow FA Women's National League (third-tier) side Loughborough Lightning at Loughborough University on 19 December with the Terriers winning 3-1. The quarter-finals created a West Yorkshire derby as the Terriers travelled to third-tier Brighouse Town winning 4-1 on 23 February. In the semi-final Huddersfield were on the road again as they faced fourth-tier Liverpool Feds at Jericho Lane on 3 March, winning 1-0 to reach the final for the first time in their history.

== Players ==
=== Current squad ===
As of 20 October 2026

Note: Flags indicate national team as defined under FIFA eligibility rules; some limited exceptions apply. Players may hold more than one non-FIFA nationality.

No.	Pos.	Nation	Player
1	GK	ENG	Kacey Bolton-Woollam
2	DF	ENG	Beth Stanfield (captain)
3	DF	ENG	Beth Ibbotson
4	FW	ENG	Kate Mallin
5	DF	ENG	Autumn Housley
6	MF	ENG	Lauren Griffiths
7	MF	ENG	Isla Phillips (on loan from Sheffield United)
8	MF	ENG	Ella Duffield
10	FW	ENG	Laura Elford
11	DF	ENG	Rebecca Beresford
12	FW	ENG	Rhema Lord-Mears
14	MF	ENG	Emma Taylor
15	MF	ENG	Olivia Turner (on loan from Manchester United)
16	MF	ENG	Molly Firth

No.	Pos.	Nation	Player
18	DF	NZL	Olivia Page
19	MF	ENG	Brierley Keane
20	FW	ENG	Louise Biggins
21	MF	ENG	Brooke Keane
22	MF	ENG	Francesca Brown
23	DF	ENG	Serena Fletcher
24	FW	ENG	Tamira Livingston
25	FW	ENG	Aimee Kelly
26	MF	ENG	Neve Birtwistle
28	MF	ENG	Mia Gosling
33	FW	WAL	Lois Cartmell (on loan from Liverpool)
33	GK	WAL	Bethan Davies
67	MF	ENG	Hannah Burgess

== Club staff ==
19/06/2026.

Club Board
Role	Person
Chair Person	(England) Andy Brown
Club Secretary	(Scotland) David Mallin
Club Treasurer	(England) Tess Fawcett

Management & Backroom Staff
Role	Person
First Team Manager	(England) Glen Preston
First Team Coach	(England) James Horner
First Team Coach	(England) Ben Tyrrell
First Team Coach	(England) Kai Pickin
Goalkeeper Coach	(England)
Development Team Manager	(England) Alan Eastwood
Development Team Coach	(England) Mark O'Neill
Physiotherapist	(England)
Nutritionist	(England)

Academy
Role	Person
Goalkeeper Coach	(England) Scott Dunn
Under 23s Manager	(England) Mark Wade
Under 23s Coach	(England) Izaak Brading
Under 16s Manager	(England) Max Payne
Under 16s Coaches	(England) Tom O'Rourke & Harry Goodall
Under 15s Manager	(England) Kai Pickin
Under 15s Coach	(England)
Under 14s Manager	(England) Farren Pringle
Under 14s Coaches	(England) Janine Crosby & Gareth Littlewood
Under 12s Manager	(England) Anthony Munday
Under 12s Coach	(England) Michael Latcham
Under 10s Manager	(England) Josh Rutherford
Under 10s Coach	(England) Shaun Burrows

== League history ==
- FA North East Regional Women's Premier Division (Fourth Tier): 2006–07 – 2010–11
- FA Northern Women's Combination League (Third Tier): 2011–12 – 2013–14
- FA Women's Premier League Northern Division (Third Tier): 2014–15 – 2017–18
- FA Women's National League Northern Premier Division (Third Tier): 2018–19 – 2023–24
- FA Women's National League Division One North (Fourth Tier): 2024–25 – 2025–26
- FA Women's National League Northern Premier Division (Third Tier): 2026–27 –

== Honours ==
=== League ===
FA Northern Women's Combination League (Third Tier)

- Champions (1): 2013–14

FA North East Regional Women's Premier Division (Fourth Tier)

- Champions (1): 2010–11
- Runners-up: 2006–07

FA Women's National League Division One North (Fourth Tier)

- Champions (1): 2025–26

=== Cup ===
Women's FA Cup

- 5th round: 2018–19, 2020–21

League Cup

- Finalists: 2021-22

League Plate

- Runners-up (2): 2014-15, 2016–17

Sheffield & Hallamshire County Cup

- Winners (6): 2016–17, 2017–18, 2021–22, 2022–23, 2023–24, 2025–26
- Runners-up (5): 2010–11, 2014–15, 2015–16, 2018–19, 2024–25
