= Rossington Main F.C. Ladies =

Rossington Main Ladies
- Full name: Rossington Main Football Club Ladies
- Founded: 2023
- Ground: Oxford Street; Rossington; South Yorkshire
- Capacity: 2,000 (250 seats)
Home colours

Rossington Main Football Club Ladies, commonly referred to as Rossington Main unless distinguishing themselves from the men's team, is an English women's football club based in Rossington Main, South Yorkshire. The club currently play in the North East Regional Women's Football League Division One South.

== History ==
The women's section of Rossington Main F.C. was formed in 2023, and entered a team into the Sheffield & Hallamshire Women's League Division One for its first season, finishing fourth.

In 2024, they entered the Women's FA Cup for the first time, and in their first game in the competition they beat Market Rasen Ladies 6–1.

=== Season by season record ===
Season	Division	Position	Women's FA Cup	Notes
2023–24	Sheffield & Hallamshire Women's League Division One	4th/12	–	
2024–25	Sheffield & Hallamshire Women's League Division One		TBD	
