= Millmoor Juniors F.C. Ladies =

Millmoor Juniors Ladies
- Full name: Millmoor Juniors Ladies Football Club
- Ground: Grange Park, Kimberworth
- League: North East Regional Women's Football League Division One South
- 2024-25: Sheffield & Hallamshire Women's Football League Division One, 2nd of 9

Millmoor Juniors Ladies Football Club is an English women's football club based in Kimberworth, Rotherham, South Yorkshire. The club currently play in the North East Regional Women's Football League Southern Division.

== History ==
=== Season by season record ===
Season	Division	Position	Women's FA Cup
2020–21	North East Regional League Division One South		
