= Dinnington Town F.C. Ladies =

Dinnington Town Women
- Full name: Dinnington Town Football Club Women
- Founded: 2025
- Ground: Phoenix Park
- League: Sheffield & Hallamshire Women's League Division One
- 2024-25: Sheffield & Hallamshire Women's Football League Division Two, 2nd of 11 (promoted)

Dinnington Town Football Club Women, commonly referred to as Dinnington Town unless distinguishing themselves from the men's team, is an English women's football club based in Dinnington, South Yorkshire. The club currently play in the Sheffield & Hallamshire Women's League Division One.

== History ==
The current women's section of Dinnington Town F.C. was formed in 2025, having moved from Wath Stars, who had entered the Sheffield & Hallamshire Women's League a year earlier and won promotion to the First Division.

They were accepted into the Women's FA Cup for the first time in the 2025/26 season, drawing Wyke Wanderers in the First Round Qualifying.

=== Season by season record ===
Season	Division	Position	Women's FA Cup	Notes
2025–26	Sheffield & Hallamshire Women's League Division One	7th/12	1RQ	
