= Barnsley W.F.C. =

Barnsley Women's Football Club
- Full name: Barnsley Women's Football Club
- Nickname: The Reds
- Founded: 1982
- Ground: Steel City Stadium, Sheffield
- Capacity: 1,000
- Chief Executive: Stephen Maddock
- Manager: Craige Richardson
- League: FA Women's National League Division One Midlands
- 2024–25: FA Women's National League Division One Midlands, 7th of 12
- Website: https://www.pitchero.com/clubs/barnsleyladiesandjuniors/teams/81354

Barnsley Women's Football Club is an English Women's Football Club based in Barnsley, South Yorkshire, England. The club currently plays in the FA Women's National League Division One Midlands, the fourth tier of the English women's football league system.

== History ==
The club was formed in 1982, under the name 'Barnsley Ladies Football Club’. The club used this name for 34 years until the end of the 2016/17 Season, when it changed its name to 'Barnsley FC Ladies’ for the following two seasons until the end of 2018/19. On 16 March 2018, Barnsley Women's Football Club Limited took over the club and changed its name to 'Barnsley Women’s Football Club’.

In 2019/20 Barnsley Women had their best ever FA Cup run when they reached the fourth round of the Women's FA Cup, losing 5-0 away to professional side Tottenham Hotspur Women in an exciting match on Sunday 26 January 2020.

On Sunday 27 November 2022, Barnsley Women played against Newcastle Women at St. James' Park in the 2nd Round of the Women's FA Cup in front of a crowd of 28,585. This was the largest attendance for a Women's FA Cup match, other than for Finals played at Wembley.

The club's reserve team currently plays in the FA Women's National League Reserve Northern Division. The club's junior teams play in the Sheffield & Hallamshire Women & Girls Leagues.

=== Season-by-season record ===
Season	Division	Position	Women's FA Cup	Notes
2007–08	North East Regional League Premier Division	7th/11		
2008–09	North East Regional League Premier Division	4th/10		
2009–10	North East Regional League Premier Division	3rd/11	1st Qualifying Round	
2010–11	North East Regional League Premier Division	2nd/11	1st Round Proper	
2011–12	North East Regional League Premier Division	3rd/12	3rd Qualifying Round	
2012–13	North East Regional League Premier Division	4th/11	3rd Qualifying Round	
2013–14	North East Regional League Premier Division	8th/11	-	
2014–15	North East Regional League Premier Division	3rd/10	-	
2015–16	North East Regional League Premier Division	2nd/12	-	County Cup Winners
2016–17	North East Regional League Premier Division	1st/13	-	Promoted & County Cup Finalists
2017–18	FA Women's National League Division 1 North	11th/12	3rd Qualifying Round	County Cup Finalists
2018–19	FA Women's National League Division 1 North	4th/12	2nd Qualifying Round	County Cup Winners
2019–20	FA Women's National League Division 1 North	1st/12	4th Round Proper	No Promotion owing to COVID-19 pandemic
2020–21	FA Women's National League Division 1 North	9th/12	1st Round Proper	League cancelled owing to COVID-19 pandemic
2021–22	FA Women's National League Division 1 North	9th/12	3rd Qualifying Round	County Cup Finalists
2022–23	FA Women's National League Division 1 North	4th/12	2nd Round Proper	
2023–24	FA Women's National League Division 1 North		1st Round Proper	
