= Dronfield Town F.C. Ladies =

Dronfield Town Ladies
- Full name: Dronfield Town Ladies Football Club
- League: East Midlands Regional Women's Football League Division One North
- 2022–23: East Midlands Regional Women's Football League Division One Central, 3rd of 9

Dronfield Town Football Club Ladies is an English Women's Football club connected to Dronfield Town F.C. and based in Dronfield, Derbyshire, England. The club currently plays in the East Midlands Regional Women's Football League Division One North, the sixth tier of the English women's football league system.

== History ==
=== Season-by-season record ===
Season	Division	Level	Position	Women's FA Cup	Notes
2014–15	Derbyshire Ladies League Division One	7	1st/7	PR	League champions
2015–16	Sheffield & Hallamshire Women's League Division One	7	2nd/7	1R	
2016–17	Sheffield & Hallamshire Women's League Division One	7	3rd/7	2QR	
2017–18	Sheffield & Hallamshire Women's League Division One	7	7th/13	-	
2018–19	Sheffield & Hallamshire Women's League Division One	7	6th/10	PR	
2019–20	Sheffield & Hallamshire Women's League Division One	7	-	PR	Season abandoned due to COVID-19 pandemic
2020–21	Sheffield & Hallamshire Women's League Division One	7	-	2QR	Season abandoned due to COVID-19 pandemic
2021–22	Sheffield & Hallamshire Women's League Division One	7	2nd/8	3QR	
2022–23	East Midlands Regional League Division One Central	6	2nd/9	1R	
2023–24	East Midlands Regional League Division One North	6	TBD	-	
Season	Division	Level	Position	FA Women's Cup	Notes
Source: Football Association
