= East Midlands Regional Women's Football League =

Women's Football league

East Midlands Women's Regional Football League
- Founded: 1990
- Country: England
- Number of clubs: 31; 11 (Premier Division); 11 (Division One North); 9 (Division One South)
- Level on pyramid: 5 and 6
- Promotion to: Level 4 FA Women's National League Division One
- Relegation to: Level 7 Derbyshire Ladies League Div 1 Leicestershire WSL; Lincolnshire County WL; Northamptonshire WFL; Nottinghamshire Ladies FL
- Domestic cup(s): National; FA Women's Cup; League; League Cup

The East Midlands Regional Women's Football League is at the fifth and sixth levels of the English women's football pyramid.

== Current clubs (2026–27) ==
=== Premier Division ===
| Club | Home ground | 2025–26 position |
|---|---|---|
| Doncaster Rovers Belles | | FAWNL Div One North, 11th |
| Gainsborough Trinity Community Women | Roses Sports Ground, Gainsborough | 6th |
| Grimsby Town Academy Women | Clee Fields, Cleethorpes | Div 1 North, 1st |
| Lincoln City Women | Martin and Co Arena, Northolme | FAWNL Div One Midlands, 12th |
| Loughborough Foxes Vixens | Holywell Sports Complex, Loughborough | 2nd |
| Mansfield Town Ladies | Field Mill, Mansfield | 3rd |
| Newport Pagnell Town Women | Willen Road, Newport Pagnell | Div 1 South, 2nd |
| Nottingham Trent University Women | Clifton Sports Hub, Nottingham | Div 1 Central, 1st |
| St. Joseph's Rockware of Worksop | Rockware Playing Fields, Worksop | 7th |
| Stamford Women | Borderville Sports Centre | 5th |

Location of the EMRWL Premier Division clubs for the 2026–27 season

=== Division One North ===
| Club | Home ground | 2025–26 position |
|---|---|---|
| Arnold Eagles Women | Miners Welfare Ground, Calverton | 3rd |
| Belper Town Women | Christchurch Meadow, Belper | 5th |
| Chesterfield Community Trust Women | Shirebrook Academy, Shirebrook | 4th |
| Dronfield Town Ladies | Stonelow Road, Dronfield | 2nd |
| Handsworth Ladies | Olivers Mount, Sheffield | EMRL Div One South, 2nd |
| Hucknall Town | | NWGL Prem, 1st |
| Newark Town Ladies | YMCA Newark & Sherwood Sports, Newark-on-Trent | 7th |
| Notts County Women Development | Southglade Leisure Centre, Nottingham | 6th |
| Staveley Miners Welfare Ladies | | S&HWL One, 1st |
| YP Women | | S&HWL One, 3rd |

Location of the EMRWL Division One North clubs for the 2026–27 season

=== Division One Central ===
| Club | Home ground | 2024–25 position |
|---|---|---|
| Asfordby Amateurs Ladies | Welby Road, Melton Mowbray | 2nd |
| Basford United Ladies | Mill Street Recreation Ground, Nottingham | Premier Division, 9th |
| Coalville Town Ravens | | LWSL, 1st |
| Long Eaton United Women | Grange Park, Long Eaton | 4th |
| Melbourne Dynamo Ladies | Melbourne Sports Park, Melbourne | DGLFL Premier, 1st |
| Sherwood Women | Selhurst Street, Nottingham | Div 1 North, 4th |
| University of Nottingham Women | Highfields Sports Ground, Nottingham | NGLFL Premier, 2nd |
| West Bridgford Colts Women | Regatta Way Sports Ground | 6th |

Location of the EMRWL Division One Central clubs for the 2026–27 season
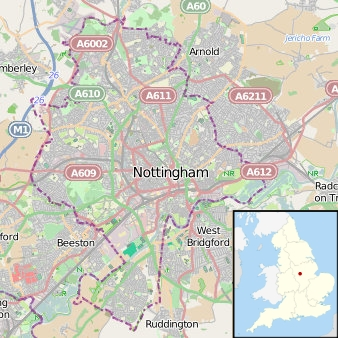
Location of the EMRWL Division One Central clubs in Nottingham for the 2026–27 season

=== Division One South ===
| Club | Home ground | 2024–25 position |
|---|---|---|
| Brackley Town Juniors Ladies | St James' Park, Brackley | NWGFL Premier, 1st |
| Dunton & Broughton United Ladies | Station Road, Dunton Bassett | 7th |
| Leicester City Ladies | Saffron Lane, Leicester | 5th |
| Netherton United Women | The Grange, Peterborough | LCWL Premier, 2nd |
| New Bradwell St Peter Ladies | Recreation Ground, Bradville | 2nd |
| Northampton Town Women Development | Moulton School and Science College, Moulton | 4th |
| River City Women | Riverside Football Ground, Leicester | Div 1 Central, 3rd |
| Stanground Cardea Sports Ladies | Stanground Sports Centre, Peterborough | 8th |
| Thrapston Women | Castle Playing Fields, Thrapston | 6th |
| Wellingborough Town Ladies | Dog and Duck Ground, Wellingborough | Div 1 South, 1st |

Location of the EMRWL Division One South clubs for the 2026–27 season

== Previous winners ==
| Season | Premier | Division One North | Division One South | |
|---|---|---|---|---|
| 2007–08 | Radcliffe Olympic LFC | Welbeck Welfare LFC | Corby S&L LFC | |
| 2008–09 | Loughborough Foxes | Sandiacre Town LFC | Heather St.Johns | |
| 2009–10 | Loughborough Students WFC | Retford United LFC | Long Eaton LFC | |
| 2012–13 | Mansfield Town LFC | Greenwood Meadows LFC | AFC Trinity LFC | |
| 2013–14 | Steel City Wanderers LFC | Solar Ladies | Gedling Town LFC | |
| 2014–15 | Peterborough Northern Star LFC | Winterton Rangers LFC | Bedworth United LFC | |
| 2015–16 | Long Eaton United LFC | Mansfield Hosiery Mills LFC | Moulton LFC | |
| 2016–17 | Sheffield Utd Womens LFC | Ollerton Town LFC | Leicester City Women Development | |
| 2017–18 | Nettleham Ladies FC | Woodlands FC Ladies | Peterborough United | |
| 2018–19 | Leicester City Women Development | Boston United LFC | Northampton Town Ladies | |
| 2019–20 | Void | Void | Void | |
| 2020–21 | Void | Void | Void | |
| 2021–22 | Northampton Town Women | Arnold Eagles Women | Derby County Women Academy | |
| Season | Premier | Division One North | Division One South | Division One Central |
| 2022–23 | Notts County Women | Grimsby Town SET Ladies | Northampton Town Women Development | Ilkeston Town Ladies |
| 2023–24 | Lincoln United Women | SJR Worksop Women | Stamford Women | Nottingham Trent University Women |
| 2024–25 | Sheffield F.C. | Gainsborough Trinity Community | Wellingborough Town | Loughborough Foxes Vixens |
