= North East Regional Women's Football League =

- Founded: 2007
- Country: England
- Number of clubs: 36; 12 (Premier Division); 12 (Division One North); 12 (Division One South)
- Level on pyramid: 5 and 6
- Promotion to: Level 4 FA Women's National League Division One
- Relegation to: Level 7 Durham County Women's League Division 1 East Riding Women's League; North Riding Women's League; Sheffield & Hallamshire Women's League Division 1 West Riding Women's League Premier Division
- Domestic cup(s): National; Women's FA Cup; League; League Cup
- Current champions: Premier Division; Bradford City Women; Division One North; Birtley Town Ladies; Division One South; Leeds Modernians Women
- Website: FA Full-time site

The North East Regional Women's Football League is a women's association football league, operating at levels 5 to 6 of the women's league pyramid.

== Current clubs (2026–27) ==
=== Premier Division ===
Club	Home ground	2025–26 position
Alnwick Town Juniors Women	St. James' Park, Alnwick	3rd
Birtley Town		Div One North, 1st
Brunsmeer Athletic Women	Hillsborough College, Owlerton	8th
Harrogate Town Ladies	Rossett Sports Centre, Harrogate	9th
i2i International Soccer Academy Women	Coach Lane, Newcastle	Div One North, 2nd
Leeds Modernians Ladies	Cookridge Lane, Leeds	Div One South, 1st
Ossett United Ladies	Ingfield Stadium, Ossett	7th
Ponteland United Women	Ponteland Leisure Centre, Ponteland	5th
South Shields Women	Harton & Westoe Miners Welfare, South Shields	6th
Spennymoor Town Ladies	Brewery Field, Spennymoor	4th
Thornaby Ladies	Teesdale Park, Stockton-on-Tees	2nd
Wallsend B.C. Women	Kirkley Park, Newcastle	10th

Location of the NERWL Premier Division clubs for the 2026–27 season

=== Division One North ===
Club	Home ground	2025–26 position
Berwick Rangers Ladies		9th
Boldon		DCWL One, 1st
Gateshead Leam Rangers		DCWL One, 2nd
Gateshead Rutherford Ladies		4th
Guisborough Town		
North Shields Athletic		
Norton & Stockton Ancients Ladies Reserves	Norton Sports Complex, Stockton-on-Tees	6th
Park View Women		8th
Redcar Town Ladies	Mo Mowlam Park, Redcar	7th
Stockton Town Ladies		3rd
Sunderland West End Ladies	Herrington Recreation Park, Sunderland	Prem Div, 12th
Washington Women	Northern Area Field, Washington	5th

Location of the NERWL Division One North clubs for the 2026–27 season

=== Division One South ===
Club	Home ground	2025–26 position
Altofts Ladies	Altofts Community Sports Club, Normanton	4th
Bottesford Town		LWGL Premier Div, 2nd
Cleethorpes Town Ladies	The Linden Club, Grimsby	EMRL Div One North, 8th
Evolution	York St John University, York	NRWL Premier Div, 1st
FC Farsley Ladies	The Citadel, Farsley	7th
Ilkley Town Ladies	Ben Rhydding Sports Centre, Ilkley	8th
Knaresborough Town		WRWL Premier, 2nd
Lower Hopton Ladies	Woodend Road, Mirfield	6th
Rossington Main Ladies	Oxford Street, Rossington	3rd
Sheffield Wednesday Ladies	Jubilee Sports Ground, Sheffield	5th
Thackley		WRWL Premier, 1st
York City Ladies development	York St John University, York	9th

Location of the NERWL Division One South clubs for the 2026–27 season

== Champions ==
Season	Premier Division	Division One North	Division One South
2022–23	Chester-le-Street Town Ladies	Wallsend Boys Club Women reserves	Barnsley FC Women
2023–24	Barnsley FC Women	Sunderland Women U23	York Railway Institute Ladies
2024–25	Chester-le-Street Town Ladies	Thornaby Women	Brunsmeer Athletic Women

== Cup competitions ==
=== League Cup ===
The league currently has just one cup competition, the League Cup, which is contested by every club in the league.

==== Finals ====
Season	Winner	Result	Runner-up	Venue
2023–24	Sunderland Women U23	2–1	Barnsley Women	
