= List of women's association football clubs in England =

This is a list of football clubs that compete within the leagues of the English Women's Football League system, as far down as the top two levels of County Leagues at Levels 7-8.

== List of Leagues and Divisions ==
League	Level
Women's Super League	Level 1
Women's Super League 2	Level 2

League	Level 3	Level 4
National League	Premier Division North / South	Division One Midlands / North / South East / South West

Below these are the Regional Leagues:

League	Level 5	Level 6
East Midlands Regional League	Premier Division	Division One Central / North / South
Eastern Regional League	Premier Division	Division One North / South
London & S.East Regional League	Premier Division	Division One North / South
North East Regional League	Premier Division	Division One North / South
North West Regional League	Premier Division	Division One Central / North / South
South West Regional League	Premier Division	Division One North / South
Southern Region League	Premier Division	Division One North / South
West Midlands Regional League	Premier Division	Division One North / South

Below these are the County Leagues:

League	Level 7	Level 8	Level 9 and below
Beds & Herts County League	Premier Division	Division One	Division Two & Three (Levels 9-10).
Birmingham County League	Premier Division	Division One	Division Two & Three (Levels 9-10).
Cambridgeshire County League	Division One	Division Two	Division Three North / South (Level 9).
Cheshire County League	Premier Division	Championship	
Cornwall County League	Premier Division	Division One	Division Two (Level 9).
Derbyshire County League	Division One	Division Two	Division Three (Level 9).
Devon County League	Premier	North/East / South/West Divisions	
Dorset County League	Women's Division One	Women's Division Two	
Durham County League	Premier Division	Division One	Division Two & Three (Levels 9-10).
East Riding County League	Division One	Division Two	
Essex County League	Premier Division	Division One	Divisions Two, Three & Four (Levels 9-11).
Gloucestershire County League	Division One	Division Two	Divisions Three & Four (Levels 9-10).
Greater London County League	Premier Division	Division One North / South	Division Two North / South (Level 9).
Greater Manchester County League	Premier Division	Division One	Divisions Two & Three (Levels 9-10).
Hampshire County League	Division One	Division Two	Divisions Three, Four, Five, Six & Seven (Levels 9-13).
Lancashire County League	Premier Division	Championship	Division One North, North West & South East (Level 9).
Leicestershire County League	Division One	Division Two	Division Three (Level 9).
Lincolnshire County League	Premier Division	Championship	
Liverpool County League	Premier Division	Division One	Division Two (Level 9).
Midwest Counties League	Division One	Division Two	
Norfolk County League	Division One	Division Two	Division Three at (Level 9).
North Riding League	Women's Premier Division	Women's Division One	
Northamptonshire County League	Premier Division	Division One	
Northumberland County League	Premiership	Division One	Division Two (Level 9).
Nottinghamshire County League	Division One	Division Two	Division Three (Level 9).
Sheffield & Hallamshire County League	Division One	Division Two	Division Three, Four & Five (Levels 9-11).
Somerset County League	Division One	Division Two	Division Three North / South (Level 9).
South East Counties League	Premier Division	Kent Division One East / West & Surrey Premier Division	Kent Division Two East / West & Three Central / East / West (Level 9-10) & Surrey Division One (Level 9).
Staffordshire County League	Premier Division	Division One	
Suffolk County League	Premiership	Championship	
Sussex County League	Premier Division	Championship	Division One (Level 9).
Thames Valley Counties League	Division One	Division Two North / South	Division Three North / South / West (Level 9).
West Riding County League	Premier Division	Division One	Divisions Two, Three, Four, Five & Six (Levels 9-13).
Wiltshire Senior League	Premier Division	Division One	Division Two (Level 9).

== Alphabetical list of Clubs ==
The divisions are correct for the 2026-27 season.

=== Key ===
Key to divisional changes
New club
Club was promoted to a higher level.
Club was transferred between divisions at the same level.
Club resigned or was demoted to a lower level.
Club was relegated to a lower level.

=== A ===
Club	League/Division	Lvl	Change from 2025–26
AEK Boco	South West Regional League Premier Div.	5	
AEK Boco Development	Gloucestershire County League Div.Two	8	From Gloucestershire County League Div.Three
AEK Boco Reserves	Gloucestershire County League Div.One	7	
AFC Bolton	Lancashire County League Championship	8	
AFC Bournemouth	National League Premier Div.South	3	
AFC Brislington	South West Regional League Div.One Central	6	From South West Regional League Div.One North
AFC Burslem	Staffordshire County League Div.One	8	New club
AFC Croydon Athletic	Greater London County League Premier Div.	7	
AFC Eastfield Sirens	East Riding County League Div.Two	8	New club
AFC Fylde	National League Div.One North	4	From North West Regional League Premier Div.
AFC Greenwich Borough	London & S.East Regional League Div.One North	6	
AFC Leyton	Greater London County League Premier Div.	7	
AFC Market Bosworth	Leicestershire County League Div.Two	8	
AFC North Kilworth	Leicestershire County League Div.Two	8	New club
AFC Oldham 2005	Greater Manchester County League Premier Div.	7	From Greater Manchester County League Div.One
AFC Pegasus	Essex County League Premier Div.	7	From Eastern Regional League Div.One South (also name change - formerly Stanway Pegasus)
AFC Portchester	Southern Region League Premier Div	5	
AFC Portchester Reserves	Southern Region League Div.One South	6	From Hampshire County League Div.One
AFC Preston	East Riding County League Div.One	7	
AFC Rushden & Diamonds	Northamptonshire County League Premier Div.	7	Rejoined club
AFC Stoneham	Southern Region League Div.One South	6	
AFC Stoneham Development	Hampshire County League Div.Two	8	From Hampshire County League Div.One
AFC Stubbington	Hampshire County League Div.Two	8	
AFC Sudbury	Eastern Regional League Premier Div.	5	From National League Div.One South East
AFC Sudbury Reserves	Eastern Regional League Div.One South	6	From Suffolk County League Premier Div.
AFC Sudbury Development	Suffolk County League Premiership	7	From Suffolk County League Championship
AFC Telford United	West Midlands Regional League Div.One North	6	
AFC Tickton	East Riding County League Div.One	7	
AFC Tickton Reserves	East Riding County League Div.Two	8	New club
AFC Varsity	Southern Region League Div.One South	6	
AFC Welwyn	Eastern Regional League Div.One South	6	From Bedfordshire & Hertfordshire County League Premier Div.
AFC Varsity Reserves	Hampshire County League Div.Two	8	
Melbourne Dynamo Reserves	Derbyshire County League Div.Two	8	From Derbyshire County League Div.Three
AFC Wimbledon	National League Premier Div.South	3	
Abbey Hulton United	Staffordshire County League Premier Div.	7	From Staffordshire County League Div.One
Heanor	Derbyshire County League Div.Two	8	From Derbyshire County League Div.Three
Abbeytown	Lancashire County League Championship	8	From Lancashire County League Div.One North
Abingdon United	National League Div.One South West	4	
Abingdon United Development	Southern Region League Div.One North	6	
Accrington Stanley	North West Regional League Div.One North	6	
Pride Park Development	Derbyshire County League Div.Two	8	From Derbyshire County League Div.Three
Accrington Stanley Reserves	Lancashire County League Premier Div.	7	
Ackworth	West Riding County League Div.One	8	
Actonians	National League Div.One South East	4	
Actonians Reserves	London & S.East Regional League Div.One North	6	
Actonians 3rds	Greater London County League Div.One South	8	
Alcester Town	Midwest Counties League Div.Two	8	New club
Aldershot Town	Hampshire County League Div.One	7	From Hampshire County League Div.Three
Allexton & New Parks	Leicestershire County League Div.One	7	
Alnwick Town	North East Regional League Premier Div.	5	
Alnwick Town Reserves	Northumberland County League Premiership	7	New club
Alphington	Devon County League North & East Div.	8	Name change - formerly RBL Alphington
Alresford Colne Rangers	Suffolk County League Premiership	7	From Suffolk County League Championship
Altofts	North East Regional League Div.One South	6	
Alton	Hampshire County League Div.One	7	From Hampshire County League Div.Two
Altrincham	North West Regional League Div.One Central	6	From North West Regional League Div.One South
Alvechurch	West Midlands Regional League Div.One South	6	From West Midlands Regional League Premier Div.
Amber Valley	Derbyshire County League Div.One	7	
Ampthill Town	Eastern Regional League Div.One North	6	From Bedfordshire & Hertfordshire County League Premier Div.
Andover New Street	Southern Region League Div.One South	6	
Anstey Nomads	East Midlands Regional League Div.One South	6	From East Midlands Regional League Premier Div.
Appledore	Devon County League Premier Div.	7	From South West Regional League Div.One South
Arden Forest	Birmingham County League Premier Div.	7	
Arnold Eagles	East Midlands Regional League Div.One North	6	
Arnold Eagles Development	Nottinghamshire County League Div.One	7	
Arsenal	Women's Super League	1	
Ascot United	National League Div.One South West	4	
Ashbourne	Derbyshire County League Div.Two	8	From Derbyshire County League Div.Three
Ashford Town (Middlesex)	London & S.East Regional League Premier Div.	5	
Ashford United	London & S.East Regional League Div.One South	6	From London & S.East Regional League Div.One North
Ashfordby Amateurs	East Midlands Regional League Div.One Central	6	
Ashfordby Amateurs LG&I 1999	Leicestershire County League Div.Two	8	
Ashmount Leigh	London & S.East Regional League Div.One South	6	
Ashton Town	North West Regional League Div.One Central	6	
Ashridge Park	Thames Valley Counties League Div.One	7	
Aston Villa	Women's Super League	1	
Atherton Laburnum Rovers	North West Regional League Div.One Central	6	
Athletico London	Eastern Regional League Premier Div.	5	
Aveley	Essex County League Premier Div.	7	New club
Avro	Greater Manchester County League Div.One	8	
Axminster Town	Devon County League North & East Div.	8	
Aylsham	Norfolk County League Div.One	7	
Aylesford	London & S.East Regional League Premier Div.	5	
Aylesford 2nds	South East Counties League Kent Div.One East	8	From South East Counties League Kent Div.Two East

=== B ===
Club	League/Division	Lvl	Change from 2025–26
B2A	South West Regional League Premier Div.	5	New club
BSC	Beds & Herts County League Premier Div.	7	New club
Badshot Lea	Southern Region League Div.One North	6	From Southern Regional League Premier Div.
Baldock Town	Beds & Herts County League Div.One	8	
Balls to Cancer	Birmingham County League Div.One	8	
Bamber Bridge	Lancashire County League Championship	8	New club
Banwell	Somerset County League Div.One	7	
Barking	London & S.East Regional League Premier Div.	5	
Barr Hill United	Greater Manchester County League Div.One	8	New club
Barnsley	Sheffield & Hallamshire County League Div.One	7	From Sheffield & Hallamshire County League Div.Two
Barnsley Women	National League Div.One Midlands	4	
Barnsley Women Reserves	Sheffield & Hallamshire County League Div.One	7	
Barton United (Bucks)	Southern Region League Div.One North	6	From Thames Valley Counties League Div.One
Barton United (Bucks) Development	Thames Valley Counties League Div.One	7	From Thames Valley Counties League Div.Two North
Barton United (Lincolnshire)	Lincolnshire County Championship	8	
Basford United	East Midlands Regional League Div.One Central	6	
Basford United U21	Nottinghamshire County League Div.One	7	Rejoined club
Basingstoke Town	Hampshire County League Div.One	7	
Bath City	South West Regional League Div.One Central	6	From South West Regional League Div.One North
Bath City Development	Somerset County League Div.One	7	
Beaconsfield Town	Southern Region League Premier Div.	5	
Beaconsfield Town Development	Thames Valley Counties League Div.Two North	8	
Beccles Town	Norfolk County League Div.Two	8	
Belper Town	East Midlands Regional League Div.One North	6	
Belper Town Development	Derbyshire County League Div.Two	8	
Berkhamsted	Beds & Herts County League Premier Div.	7	
Berkswich	Staffordshire County League Div.One	8	New club
Berwick Rangers Community Academy	Northumberland County League Div.One	8	From North East Regional League Div.One North
Betteshanger Welfare	South East Counties League Kent Div.One East	8	From South East Counties League Premier Div.
Beverley Town	East Riding County League Div.One	7	
Bexhill United	Sussex County League Championship	8	From London & S.East Regional League Div.One South
Biddenden	South East Counties League Premier Div.	7	From South East Counties League Kent Div.One East
Bideford	Devon County League Premier Div.	7	
Biggleswade United	Beds & Herts County League Premier Div.	7	From Eastern Regional League Div.One North
Billericay Town	National League Div.One South East	4	From National League Premier Div.South
Bilston Town	Staffordshire County League Premier Div.	7	From Staffordshire County League Div.One
Bingham Town Red	Nottinghamshire County League Div.Two	8	From Nottinghamshire County League Div.Three
Birmingham City	Women's Super League	1	From Women's Super League 2
Birmingham Medsoc	Birmingham County League Div.One	8	
Birstall United	Leicestershire County League Div.One	7	
Birtley Town	North East Regional League Premier Div.	5	From North East Regional League Div.One North
Bishop Auckland	Durham County League Div.One	8	From Durham County League Premier Div.
Bishops Cannings	Wiltshire County League Div One.	8	
Bishops Cleeve	South West Regional League Div.One North	6	From Gloucestershire County League Div.One
Bishops Cleeve Development	Gloucestershire County League Div.Two	8	From Gloucestershire County League Div.Three
Bishops Lydeard	South West Regional League Div.One South	6	From South West Regional League Premier Div.
Bishops Lydeard Reserves	Somerset County League Div.Two	8	
Blaby & Whetstone	Leicestershire County League Div.Two	8	
Blackburn CSC	North West Regional League Div.One North	6	New club
Blackburn Eagles	Lancashire County League Premier Div.	7	
Blackburn Rovers	National League Div.One North	4	
Blackpool	North West Regional League Div.One North	6	
Blisworth	Northamptonshire County League Div.One	8	Rejoined club
Blunsdon	Wiltshire County League Div One.	8	
Blyth Spartans	Northumberland County League Premiership	7	From Northumberland County League Div.Two
Bodmin	Cornwall County League Premier Div.	7	
Bognor Regis Town	Southern Region League Div.One South	6	From London & S.East Regional League Div.One South
Boldmere St.Michaels	National League Premier Div.North	3	From National League Div.One Midlands
Boldon	North East Regional League Div.One North	6	From Durham County League Premier Div.
Bolehall Swifts	Birmingham County League Premier Div.	7	From Birmingham County League Div.Two
Bolton Wanderers	North West Regional League Premier Div.	5	
Bolton Wanderers Reserves	North West Regional League Div.One North	6	
Boro Rangers	North Riding League Women's Premier Div.	7	
Boroughbridge	West Riding County League Div.One	8	
Boston United	Lincolnshire County Championship	8	From Lincolnshire County League Premier Div.
Bottesford Town	North East Regional League Div.One South	6	From Lincolnshire County League Premier Div.
Bournemouth Electric	Dorset County League Women's Div.Two	8	New club
Bournemouth Manor	Dorset County League Women's Div.One	7	
Bournemouth Poppies	Dorset County League Women's Div.One	7	
Bournemouth Sports	National League Div.One South West	4	
Bournemouth Sports Reserves	Southern Region League Div.One South	6	
Bowers & Pitsea	Eastern Regional League Premier Div.	5	
Bowers & Pitsea Reserves	Essex County League Premier Div.	7	
Brackley Town	Northamptonshire County League Premier Div.	7	From East Midlands Regional League Div.One South
Brackley Town U23s	Northamptonshire County League Div.One	8	
Bradford City	National League Div.One North	4	From North East Regional League Premier Div.
Bradford City U19s	West Riding County League Premier Div.	7	From West Riding County League Div.One
Bradworthy	Devon County League Premier Div.	7	
Braintree Athletic	Essex County League Premier Div.	7	
Brandesburton	East Riding County League Div.One	7	From East Riding County League Div.Two
Brandon United	Durham County Premier Div.	7	From Durham County League Div.One
Brantham Athletic Development	Suffolk County League Premiership	7	
Braunton	Devon County League Premier Div.	7	
Brayton Belles	West Riding County League Div.One	8	
Bredon	Midwest Counties League Div.Two	8	New club
Brentford	London & S.East Regional League Premier Div.	5	
Brentwood Town	Eastern Regional League Premier Div.	5	From Eastern Regional League Div.One South
Bridgwater United	National League Div.One South West	4	
Bridgwater United Reserves	South West Regional League Div.One South	6	Rejoined club
Bridlington Town Rovers	East Riding County League Div.Two	8	
Brighouse Town	West Riding County League Div.One	8	From West Riding County League Div.Two
Bridport	Dorset County League Women's Div.One	7	From Somerset County League Div.One
Brigg Town	Lincolnshire County Premier Div.	7	
Brightlingsea Regent	Essex County League Premier Div.	7	
Brighton & Hove Albion	Women's Super League	1	
Brighton Seagals	Sussex County League Championship	8	
Brinsworth Whitehill	Sheffield & Hallamshire County League Div.Two	8	
Brislington	South West Regional League Div.One Central	6	New club
Bristol & West	Gloucestershire County League Div.One	7	
Bristol Brunel	South West Regional League Div.One North	6	From Gloucestershire County League Div.One
Bristol Brunel Development	Gloucestershire County League Div.One	7	New club
Bristol City	Women's Super League 2	2	
Bristol Manor Farm	Gloucestershire County League Div.Two	8	New club
Bristol Rovers	National League Div.One South West	4	
Broadbridge Heath	Sussex County League Premier Div.	7	
Broadstone	Dorset County League Women's Div.Two	8	New club
Brodsworth Main	Sheffield & Hallamshire County League Div.One	7	Name change - was Brodsworth Welfare
Bromley	London & S.East Regional League Premier Div.	5	From London & S.East Regional League Div.One North
Bromley Development	South East Counties League Kent Div.One West	8	
Bromsgrove Sporting	West Midlands Regional League Div.One South	6	
Bromsgrove Sporting Development	Midwest Counties League Div.Two	8	From Midwest Counties League Div.One
Brookside Athletic	Leicestershire County League Div.One	7	
Brundall Bolts	Norfolk County League Div.Two	8	
Buckland Athletic	Devon County League South & West Div.	8	New club
Bugbrooke St. Michaels	Northamptonshire County League Premier Div.	7	
Bungay Town	Norfolk County League Div.Two	8	From Norfolk County League Div.Three
Bure Valley	Norfolk County League Div.One	7	
Bure Valley Development	Norfolk County League Div.Two	8	New club
Burgess Hill Town	Sussex County League Premier Div.	7	
Burghfield	Thames Valley Counties League Div.Two South	8	
Burnham United	Somerset County League Div.Two	8	From Somerset County League Div.Three North
Burnley	Women's Super League 2	2	From National League Premier Div. North
Burnley Belvedere	Lancashire County League Championship	8	
Burscough	Liverpool County League Premier Div.	7	From Liverpool County League Div.One
Burnley United	Lancashire County League Championship	8	
Bursledon	Southern Region League Div.One South	6	
Burton Albion	West Midlands Regional League Div.One North	6	From West Midlands Regional League Premier Div.
Burwell	Cambridgeshire County League Div.Two	8	From Cambridgeshire County League Div.Three
Bury FC	North West Regional League Premier Div.	5	
Bury FC Development	Greater Manchester County League Div.One	8	
Bury FC Reserves	North West Regional League Div.One Central	6	From Greater Manchester County League Premier Div.
Bury Rangers	Beds & Herts County League Div.One	8	From Beds & Herts County League Div.Two
Buxton	Derbyshire County League Div.One	7	
Bury Town Community	Suffolk County League Championship	8	
Buxton Juniors	Derbyshire County League Div.Two	8	

=== C ===
Club	League/Division	Lvl	Change from 2025–26
Callington Town	Cornwall County League Premier Div.	7	From Cornwall County League Div.One
Calne Town	Wiltshire County League Premier Div.	7	
Calverton Miners Welfare	Nottinghamshire County League Div.One	7	
Camborne School of Mines	Cornwall County League Premier Div.	7	New club
Cambourne Town	Cambridgeshire County League Div.Two	8	
Cambridge City	Eastern Regional League Div.One North	6	From Eastern Regional League Premier Div.
Cambridge City Devs	Cambridgeshire County League Div.Two	8	New club
Cambridge City U23s	Cambridgeshire County League Div.One	7	
Cambridge Cobras	Cambridgeshire County League Div.Two	8	From Cambridgeshire County League Div.Three
Cambridge Rangers	Cambridgeshire County League Div.One	7	
Cambridge United	National League Div.One South East	4	
Camden & Islington United	Greater London County League Div.One North	8	
Camden Town	London & S.East Regional League Div.One North		
Capel Plough	Suffolk County League Premiership	7	
Capel Plough Reserves	Suffolk County League Championship	8	
Carlisle United	Lancashire County League Premier Div.	7	
Carshalton Athletic	London & S.East Regional League Div.One North	6	From South East Counties League Surrey Premier Div.
Carterton	Thames Valley Counties League Div.Two North	8	New club
Castle Donington	Derbyshire County League Div.One	7	
Catterick Village Roses	North Riding League Women's Div.One	8	
Caversham United	Thames Valley Counties League Div.One	7	
Chanterlands	East Riding County League Div.Two	8	From East Riding County League Div.One
Charlestown	Cornwall County League Div.One	8	From Cornwall County League Div.Two
Charlton Athletic	Women's Super League	1	From Women's Super League 2
Charnock Ridgeway	Sheffield & Hallamshire County League Div.Two	8	From Sheffield & Hallamshire County League Div.Three
Chasetown	West Midlands Regional League Div.One North	6	
Chasetown Youth	Staffordshire County League Premier Div.	7	
Chatham Town	National League Div.One South East	4	
Chatham Town Development	South East Counties League Premier Div.	7	From South East Counties League Kent Div.One Central
Cheddar	Somerset County League Div.One	7	
Chelmsford City	Eastern Regional League Div.One South	6	
Chelmsford City Reserves	Essex County Premier Div.	7	From Essex County League Div.Two
Chelsea	Women's Super League	1	
Cheltenham Civil Service	Gloucestershire County League Div.One	7	From Gloucestershire County League Div.Two
Cheltenham Town	National League Premier Div.South	3	
Cherry Burton	East Riding County League Div.One	7	
Chesham United	Southern Region League Premier Div.	5	From National League Div.One South East
Chesham United Development	Southern Region League Div.One North	6	
Chessington & Hook United	South East Counties League Surrey Premier Div.	8	New club
Chester FC	North West Regional League Div.One South	6	
Chester-le-Street Amazons	Durham County League Premier Div.	7	
Chester-le-Street Town	National League Div.One North	4	
Chester-le-Street Waldridge Park	Durham County League Div.One	8	
Chesterfield	National League Div.One Midlands	4	From East Midlands Regional League Premier Div.
Chesterfield Community Trust	North East Regional League Div.One North	6	
Chesterfield Town	Sheffield & Hallamshire County League Div.Two	8	From Sheffield & Hallamshire County League Div.Three
Chesterfield U23s	Derbyshire County League Div.One	7	
Chichester City	Sussex County League Championship	8	New club
Chinnor	Thames Valley Counties League Div.Two North	8	From Thames Valley Counties League Div.Three North
Chippenham Town	Wiltshire County League Div One.	8	New club
Chislehurst Glebe	South East Counties League Premier Div.	7	
Chorley Under 23s	Lancashire County League Championship	8	From North West Regional League Div.One North
Chorley	National League Div.One North	4	
Cirencester Town	South West Regional League Div.One North	6	
Cinderford Town	Gloucestershire County League Div.Two	8	
Civil Service	Greater London County League Div.One South	8	
City of Gloucester	Gloucestershire County League Div.One	7	From Gloucestershire County League Div.Two
Clacton Regent	Essex County League Div.One	8	
Clapham United	Greater London County League Div.One South	8	From Greater London County League Div.Two Central/South
Clapton Community	London & S.East Regional League Div.One North	6	
Clapton Community Reserves	Greater London County League Div.One North	8	
Claydon	Suffolk County League Championship	8	New club
Cleethorpes Town	North East Regional League Div.One South	6	From East Midlands Regional League Div.One North
Cleethorpes Town Res	Lincolnshire County Championship	8	
Clevedon Town	Somerset County League Div.Two	8	From Somerset County League Div.Three North
Coalville Town Ravens	East Midlands Regional League Div.One Central	6	
Coalville Town Ravens Development	Leicestershire County League Div.One	7	From Leicestershire County League Div.Two
Cobham Sports	Dorset County League Women's Div.Two	8	From Dorset County League Women's Div.One
Colchester United	Eastern Regional League Div.One South	6	
Colne	Lancashire County League Premier Div.	7	
Colney Heath	Beds & Herts County League Premier Div.	7	From Eastern Regional League Div.One North
Congleton Town	Cheshire County League Premier Div.	7	
Consett	Durham County League Div.One	8	From North East Regional League Div.One North
Coplestonians	Suffolk County League Championship	8	
Corby Steelers	Northamptonshire County League Premier Div.	7	Name change - formerly Corby Town
Corby Steelers Reserves	Northamptonshire County League Div.One	8	Name change - formerly Corby Town Reserves
Costessey Sports	Eastern Regional League Div.One North	6	From Norfolk County League Div.One
Costessey Sports Reserves	Norfolk County League Div.One	7	New club
Corsham Town	South West Regional League Div.One North	6	
Cotgrave	Nottinghamshire County League Div.Two	8	From Nottinghamshire County League Div.Three
Coton Green	West Midlands Regional League Div.One North	6	From Birmingham County League Premier Div.
Coundon Court	West Midlands Regional League Premier Div.	5	
Coundon Court Development Silver	Birmingham County League Premier Div.	7	
Coventrians	Birmingham County League Div.One	8	Rejoined club
Coventry Sphinx	West Midlands Regional League Premier Div.	5	
Cramlington United	Northumberland County League Premiership	7	
Cramlington Town	Northumberland County League Premiership	7	From Northumberland County League Div.One
Cray Wanderers	South East Counties League Premier Div.	7	
Crayford Arrows	South East Counties League Kent Div.One West	8	
Crediton United	Devon County League Premier Div.	7	
Crewe	Cheshire County League Premier Div.	7	From Cheshire County League Championship
Crewe Alexandra	North West Regional League Premier Div.	5	
Crick Athletic	Northamptonshire County League Div.One	8	From Northamptonshire County League Premier Div.
Crowborough Athletic	Sussex County League Premier Div.	7	New club
Croydon	South East Counties League Surrey Premier Div.	8	
Crusaders	West Midlands Regional League Div.One South	6	
Crystal Palace	Women's Super League	1	From Women's Super League 2
Cullercoats	Northumberland County League Div.One	8	
Cullompton Rangers	Devon County League North & East Div.	8	New club
Curzon Ashton	Greater Manchester County League Premier Div.	7	From North West Regional League Premier Div.

=== D ===
Club	League/Division	Lvl	Change from 2025–26
Darlington	North East Regional League Div.One North	6	From Durham County League Premier Div.
Darlington Railway Athletic	Durham County League Div.One	8	
Darlington Spraire	Durham County League Div.One	8	
Darlington Young Bulls	Durham County League Div.One	8	New club
Dartford	National League Div.One South East	4	From London & S.East Regional League Premier Div.
Dartford Reserves	South East Counties League Kent Div.One West	8	From South East Counties League Kent Div.One Central
Darwen	North West Regional League Premier Div.	5	
Deal Town	South East Counties League Kent Div.One East	8	
Deanshanger Athletic	Northamptonshire County League Div.One	8	
Dearne & District	Sheffield & Hallamshire County League Div.Two	8	
Debenham	Suffolk County League Championship	8	New club
Deeping Rangers	Cambridgeshire County League Div.One	7	
Denham United	Southern Region League Premier Div.	5	From Southern Region League Div.One North
Denham United Reserves	Thames Valley Counties League Div.Two South	8	
Derby County	National League Premier Div.North	3	
Dereham Town	Norfolk County League Div.Two	8	From Norfolk County League Div.Three
Dersingham Rovers	Norfolk County League Div.Two	8	From Norfolk County League Div.Three
Desborough	Northamptonshire County League Div.One	8	
Dexter Sports	Dorset County League Women's Div.Two	8	New club
Didcot Town	Thames Valley Counties League Div.Two North	8	
Dinnington Town	Sheffield & Hallamshire County League Div.One	7	
Doncaster Rovers Belles	East Midlands Regional League Premier Div.	5	From National League Div.One North
Dorchester Town	Dorset County League Women's Div.One	7	
Dorchester Town Reserves	Dorset County League Women's Div.Two	8	New club
Dorking Wanderers	London & S.East Regional League Premier Div.	5	
Dorking Wanderers U23s	London & S.East Regional League Div.One South	6	From South East Counties League Surrey Premier Div.
Doveridge	Derbyshire County League Div.One	7	From Derbyshire County League Div.Two
Downend Flyers	South West Regional League Div.One North	6	
Downend Flyers Reserves	Gloucestershire County League Div.Two	8	
Drake	Devon County League South & West Div.	8	New club
Draycott Victoria	Derbyshire County League Div.One	7	
Droitwich Spa	West Midlands Regional League Div.One South	6	
Droitwich Spa Development	Midwest Counties League Div.Two	8	From Midwest Counties League Div.One
Dronfield Town	East Midlands Regional League Div.One North	6	
Dudley Town	West Midlands Regional League Div.One South	6	From Midwest Counties League Div.One
Duffield Dynamo	Derbyshire County League Div.Two	8	From Derbyshire County League Div.One
Dukinfield Town	Greater Manchester County League Premier Div.	7	New club
Dulwich Hamlet	National League Div.One South East	4	
Dulwich Hamlet Reserves	London & S.East Regional League Div.One North	6	
Dunstable Town Lionesses	Eastern Regional League Div.One North	6	
Dunston	Durham County League Premier Div.	7	From Northumberland County League Div.Two
Dunton & Broughton United	East Midlands Regional League Div.One South	6	
Durham	Women's Super League 2	2	
Durham Cestria	National League Div.One North	4	
Durham Cestria Reserves	Durham County League Premier Div.	7	
Dursley Town	Gloucestershire County League Div.One	7	
Dussingdale & Hellesdon Rovers	Eastern Regional League Premier Div.	5	

=== E ===
Club	League/Division	Lvl	Change from 2025–26
EB Lions	Beds & Herts County League Div.One	8	From Beds & Herts County League Div.Two
Easington Sports	Thames Valley Counties League Div.One	7	From Thames Valley Counties League Div.Two North
East Finchley	Greater London County League Premier Div.	7	From Greater London County League Div.One North
East Goscote United	Leicestershire County League Div.Two	8	From Leicestershire County League Div.One
East Oxford	Thames Valley Counties League Div.Two North	8	From Thames Valley Counties League Div.One
East Riding Rangers	East Riding County League Div.Two	8	
East Thurrock Community	Essex County League Premier Div.	7	From Essex County League Div.One
Eastbourne Borough	London & S.East Regional League Premier Div.	5	From London & S.East Regional League Div.One South
Eastbourne Town	Sussex County League Premier Div.	7	
Eastwood	Nottinghamshire County League Div.Two	8	New club
Eastwood & Kimberley	Nottinghamshire County League Div.One	7	From Nottinghamshire County League Div.Two
Eaton Socon	Cambridgeshire County League Div.One	7	
Ebbsfleet United	London & S.East Regional League Div.One North	6	From London & S.East Regional League Premier Div
Egerton	Cheshire County League Championship	8	
Elburton Villa	Devon County League South & West Div.	8	New club
Elloughton Blackburn	East Riding County League Div.One	7	
Elm Fusion	Devon County League South & West Div.	8	New club
Ely City	Cambridgeshire County League Div.Two	8	
Enfield Town	Eastern Regional League Div.One South	6	From Eastern Regional League Premier Div.
Enfield Town Development	Greater London County League Div.One North	8	
Evergreen Eagles	Beds & Herts County League Div.One	8	From Beds & Herts County League Div.Two
Eversley & California	Thames Valley Counties League Div.One	7	
Everton	Women's Super League	1	
Evesham United	West Midlands Regional League Div.One South	6	From Midwest Counties League Div.One
Evolution Football Academy	North East Regional League Div.One South	6	From North Riding League Women's Premier Div.
Exeter City	National League Premier Div.South	3	
Exmouth Riptide	Devon County League North & East Div.	8	

=== F ===
Club	League/Division	Lvl	Change from 2025–26
FC Abbey Meads	South West Regional League Div.One North	6	From Wiltshire County League Premier Div.
FC Abbey Meads Reserves	Wiltshire County League Div One.	8	New club
FC Chippenham Youth	Wiltshire County League Premier Div.	7	From Wiltshire County League Development Div.
FC Community of Liverpool	Liverpool County League Div.One	8	
FC Galacticos	Devon County League South & West Div.	8	New club
FC Hartlepool	Durham County League Premier Div.	7	From Durham County League Div.One
FC Northern	Liverpool County League Premier Div.	7	
FC St. Helens	North West Regional League Premier Div.	5	From North West Regional League Div.One Central
FC St. Helens Reserves	Liverpool County League Premier Div.	7	New club
FC United of Manchester	North West Regional League Premier Div.	5	
FC Viking Valkyries	Norfolk County League Div.Two	8	From Norfolk County League Div.One
Falmouth	Cornwall County League Div.One	8	From Cornwall County League Div.Two
Farnborough	Southern Region League Div.One North	6	
Farnham Town	Southern Region League Premier Div.	5	From Southern Region League Div.One South
Farsley Celtic	North East Regional League Div.One South	6	
Faversham Strike Force	South East Counties League Kent Div.One East	8	
Felling Magpies	Durham County League Div.One	8	New club
Feniton	South West Regional League Div.One South	6	
Finchampstead	Southern Region League Div.One North	6	From Thames Valley Counties League Div.One
Finchampstead Reserves	Thames Valley Counties League Div.Two South	8	From Thames Valley Counties League Div.Three South
Finedon Volta	Northamptonshire County League Div.One	8	New club
Flackwell Heath	Thames Valley Counties League Div.One	7	From Thames Valley Counties League Div.Two South
Fleet Town	Southern Region League Premier Div.	5	
Fleet Town Reserves	South East Counties League Surrey Premier Div.	8	From South East Counties League Surrey Div.One
Fleetwood Town Wrens	North West Regional League Div.One North	6	From North West Regional League Premier Div.
Fleetwood Town Wrens Reserves	Lancashire County League Championship	8	From North West Regional League Div.One North
Flixton Lionesses	Greater Manchester County League Div.One	8	From Greater Manchester County League Div.Three
Folkestone Invicta	South East Counties League Kent Div.One East	8	
Forge Way	West Riding County League Premier Div.	7	
Framlingham Town	Suffolk County League Championship	8	
Frampton Rangers	South West Regional League Div.One North	6	From South West Regional League Premier Div.
Fremington	Devon County League Premier Div.	7	From Devon County League North & East Div.
Frickley Athletic	Sheffield & Hallamshire County League Div.One	7	
Frodsham Town	Cheshire County League Premier Div.	7	From Cheshire County League Championship
Frome Town	Somerset County League Div.One	7	
Frontiers	Essex County League Premier Div.	7	
Fulbourne Institute Bluebirds	Cambridgeshire County League Div.One	7	From Eastern Regional League Div.One North
Fulham	National League Premier Div.South	3	From National League Div.One South East
Fusion	Greater London County League Div.One North	8	From Greater London County League Div.Two North

=== G ===
Club	League/Division	Lvl	Change from 2025–26
GT7 Academy	Lancashire County League Premier Div.	7	
Gainsborough Trinity Community	East Midlands Regional League Premier Div.	5	
Garston	Beds & Herts County League Premier Div.	7	
Garston Mets	Beds & Herts County League Div.One	8	
Gateshead Leam Rangers	North East Regional League Div.One North	6	From Durham County League Premier Div.
Gateshead Rutherford	North East Regional League Div.One North	6	
Gateshead Rutherford Reserves	Northumberland County League Premiership	7	From Northumberland County League Div.Two
Gedling Southbank	Nottinghamshire County League Div.One	7	From Nottinghamshire County League Div.Two
Glenavon Belles	Cheshire County League Championship	8	
Glossop North End	Greater Manchester County League Div.One	8	From Greater Manchester County League Div.Two
Gloucester City	South West Regional League Premier Div.	5	
Gloucester City Reserves	South West Regional League Div.One North	6	
Godmanchester Rovers	Cambridgeshire County League Div.One	7	
Golcar United	West Riding County League Premier Div.	7	
Gornal Athletic	Birmingham County League Premier Div.	7	From Birmingham County League Div.Three
Gornal DC	Birmingham County League Div.One	8	From Birmingham County League Div.Two
Gosport Borough	Hampshire County League Div.One	7	
Gosport Falcons	Hampshire County League Div.Two	8	
Grantham Town	Lincolnshire County Championship	8	New club
Gravesham	South East Counties League Kent Div.One West	8	From South East Counties League Kent Div.One Central
Grays Athletic	Essex County League Div.One	8	
Great Danes	Essex County League Div.One	8	From Essex County League Div.Two
Great Driffield	East Riding County League Div.Two	8	
Great Bradfords	Essex County League Div.One	8	
Great Yarmouth Town	Norfolk County League Div.Two	8	
Gresley Rovers	Derbyshire County League Div.One	7	From Derbyshire County League Div.Two
Grimsby Borough	Lincolnshire County Championship	8	From Lincolnshire County League Premier Div.
Grimsby Town	East Midlands Regional League Premier Div.	5	From East Midlands Regional League Div.One North
Guernsey	Southern Region League Div.One South	6	
Guisborough Town	North Riding League Women's Premier Div.	7	
Guiseley Lionesses	West Riding County League Div.One	8	From West Riding County League Div.Two
Gwalia United	National League Div.One South West	4	From National League Premier Div.South

=== H ===
Club	League/Division	Lvl	Change from 2025–26
HBW United	Lincolnshire County Championship	8	
Hackney	London & S.East Regional League Div.One North	6	
Hackney Reserves	Greater London County League Div.One North	8	
Hailsham Town	Sussex County League Premier Div.	7	From Sussex County League Championship
Halesowen Town	West Midlands Regional League Div.One South	6	
Halesworth Town	Suffolk County League Premiership	7	
Halifax FC	National League Div.One North	4	From National League Premier Div.North
Halwill	Devon County League North & East Div.	8	
Hammersmith	London & S.East Regional League Premier Div.	5	From London & S.East Regional League Div.One North
Hammersmith Reserves	Greater London County League Premier Div.	7	From Greater London County League Div.One South
Hamstreet	South East Counties League Kent Div.One East	8	New club
Handsworth	East Midlands Regional League Div.One North	6	From North East Regional League Div.One South
Handsworth Reserves	Sheffield & Hallamshire County League Div.One	7	
Harborough Town	Leicestershire County League Div.One	7	
Haringay Borough	Eastern Regional League Premier Div.	5	
Harpenden Town	Eastern Regional League Premier Div.	5	
Harpenden Colts	Beds & Herts County League Div.One	8	
Harpole	Northamptonshire County League Premier Div.	7	
Harpole Reserves	Northamptonshire County League Div.One	8	
Harrogate Railway	West Riding County League Premier Div.	7	
Harrogate Town	North East Regional League Premier Div.	5	
Hartlepool United	North East Regional League Div.One North	6	
Hartlepool United Youth	Durham County League Premier Div.	7	
Hartpury	South West Regional League Div.One North	6	From Gloucestershire County League Div.One
Haslingden	North West Regional League Div.One North	6	
Hashtag United	National League Premier Div.South	3	
Hashtag United Reserves	Eastern Regional League Div.One South	6	
Hassocks	Sussex County League Premier Div.	7	
Hastings United	London & S.East Regional League Div.One South	6	
Hatfield Peveral	Essex County League Div.One	8	From Essex County League Div.Two
Havant & Waterlooville	Southern Region League Div.One South	6	
Havant & Waterlooville Reserves	Hampshire County League Div.Two	8	From Hampshire County League Div.Three
Hayes & Yeading	Thames Valley Counties League Div.Two South	8	New club
Headington	Thames Valley Counties League Div.Two North	8	
Healing Hotspurs	Lincolnshire County Championship	8	
Heaton Hawks	Northumberland County League Premiership	7	
Heaton Hawks Reserves	Northumberland County League Div.One	8	
Hebburn Town	Durham County League Premier Div.	7	
Heddon United	Northumberland County League Premiership	7	From Northumberland County League Div.One
Hednesford Town	West Midlands Regional League Premier Div.	5	
Hereford FC	West Midlands Regional League Div.One South	6	
Hereford Pegasus	Midwest Counties League Div.One	7	From West Midlands Regional League Div.One South
Herne Bay	London & S.East Regional League Div.One North	6	
Herne Bay Development	South East Counties League Premier Div.	7	From South East Counties League Kent Div.One East
Hertford Town	Eastern Regional League Div.One South	6	
Hessle Rangers	East Riding County League Div.Two	8	From East Riding County League Div.One
Heyford Athletic	Northamptonshire County League Premier Div.	7	From Northamptonshire County League Div.One
Hickling	Norfolk County League Div.One	7	From Norfolk County League Div.Two
Higham Town	East Midlands Regional League Div.One South	6	From Northamptonshire County League Premier Div.
Highworth Town	Wiltshire County League Div One.	8	From Wiltshire County League Premier Div.
Hilton Harriers	Derbyshire County League Div.One	7	From Derbyshire County League Div.Two
Histon	Eastern Regional League Premier Div.	5	From Eastern Regional League Div.One North
Hitchin Belles Blues	Eastern Regional League Div.One North	6	
Hitchin Belles U23s	Beds & Herts County League Div.One	8	From Beds & Herts County League Div.Three
Holbeach United	Cambridgeshire County League Div.One	7	New club
Hollands & Blair	South East Counties League Premier Div.	7	
Holme Rovers	East Riding County League Div.Two	8	
Horden Community Welfare	Durham County League Div.One	8	
Horrabridge Rangers	Devon County League South & West Div.	8	
Horsforth St.Margarets	West Riding County League Premier Div.	7	From West Riding County League Div.One
Horsham	Sussex County League Premier Div.	7	
Howden	East Riding County League Div.Two	8	
Hucknall Town	East Midlands Regional League Div.One North	6	From Nottinghamshire County League Div.One
Huddersfield Amateur	West Riding County League Premier Div.	7	From West Riding County League Div.One
Huddersfield Town	National League Premier Div.North	3	From National League Div.One North
Hyde United	Greater Manchester County League Premier Div.	7	
Hull City	National League Premier Div.North	3	
Hunters District	Devon County League South & West Div.	8	
Hutton (Essex)	Eastern Regional League Div.One South	6	From Eastern Regional League Premier Div.
Hutton (Essex) Development	Essex County League Div.One	8	
Hutton (Essex) Reserves	Essex County League Premier Div.	7	New club

=== I ===
Club	League/Division	Lvl	Change from 2025–26
i2i International Soccer Academy	North East Regional League Premier Div.	5	From North East Regional League Div.One North
Ilkley Town	North East Regional League Div.One South	6	
Ilminster Town	South West Regional League Div.One South	6	From South West Regional League Premier Div.
Ilminster Town Reserves	Somerset County League Div.One	7	From Somerset County League Div.Two
Immingham Town	Lincolnshire County Championship	8	New club
Inglemire	East Riding County League Div.One	7	
Inglemire Reserves	East Riding County League Div.Two	8	
Ipswich Town	Women's Super League 2	2	
Ipswich Valley Rangers	Suffolk County League Premiership	7	From Suffolk County League Championship
Ipswich Wanderers	Suffolk County League Championship	8	New club
Islington Borough	Greater London County League Premier Div.	7	

=== J ===
Club	League/Division	Lvl	Change from 2025–26
Jersey Bulls	South East Counties League Surrey Premier Div.	8	From South East Counties League Surrey Div.One

=== K ===
Club	League/Division	Lvl	Change from 2025–26
KLSC	Norfolk County League Div.One	7	
Kelsall	Cheshire County League Championship	8	New club
Kempsey Phoenix	Midwest Counties League Div.Two	8	From Midwest Counties League Div.One
Kenilworth Wardens	Birmingham County League Div.One	8	New club
Kendal Town	Lancashire County League Championship	8	From Lancashire County League Div.One North
Kenningwell United	Greater London County League Div.One South	8	
Kent United	South East Counties League Kent Premier Div.	7	From South East Counties League Kent Div.One Central
Kettering	Northamptonshire County League Div.One	8	From Northamptonshire County League Premier Div.
Kewford Eagles	Birmingham County League Div.One	8	
Keynsham Town	National League Div.One South West	4	
Keynsham Town Reserves	South West Regional League Div.One Central	6	From Wiltshire County League Premier Div.
Keyworth United	Nottinghamshire County League Div.One	7	
Kidderminster Harriers	National League Div.One Midlands	4	
Kidlington	Southern Region League Div.One North	6	
Kidlington Greens	Thames Valley Counties League Div.Two North	8	From Thames Valley Counties League Div.Three West
Kidsgrove Athletic Lionesses	Staffordshire County League Div.One	8	New club
Kilkhampton	Cornwall County League Premier Div.	7	
Killingworth	Northumberland County League Div.One	8	
Kingfisher	Midwest Counties League Div.One	7	From West Midlands Regional League Div.One South
Kingfisher Development	Midwest Counties League Div.Two	8	From Midwest Counties League Div.One
Kings Hill	South East Counties League Premier Div.	7	
Kingsmeadow United	South East Counties League Surrey Premier Div.	8	New club
Kingswood	Gloucestershire County League Div.Two	8	From Gloucestershire County League Div.Three
Kingswood United	East Riding County League Div.Two	8	From East Riding County League Div.One
Kirby Muxloe	Leicestershire County League Div.One	7	
Kiveton Park	Sheffield & Hallamshire County League Div.Two	8	From Sheffield & Hallamshire County League Div.One
Knaresborough Town	North East Regional League Div.One South	6	From West Riding County League Premier Div.
Knowle	West Midlands Regional League Premier Div.	5	From West Midlands Regional League Div.One South

=== L ===
Club	League/Division	Lvl	Change from 2025–26
Lakeside Athletic	Devon County League South & West Div.	8	
Lancaster City	Lancashire County League Premier Div.	7	From Lancashire County League Championship
Lane Head	West Midlands Regional League Div.One North	6	From Staffordshire County League Premier Div.
Lane Head Development	Staffordshire County League Div.One	8	New club
Larkfield	South East Counties League Kent Div.One East	8	From South East Counties League Kent Div.One Central
Larkspur Rovers	Thames Valley Counties League Div.Two South	8	From Southern Region League Div.One South
Launton	Thames Valley Counties League Div.Two North	8	From Thames Valley Counties League Div.Three North
Leafield Athletic	National League Div.One Midlands	4	
Leamington	West Midlands Regional League Div.One South	6	New club
Leamington Lions	Birmingham County League Premier Div.	7	From West Midlands Regional League Div.One South
Leatherhead	London & S.East Regional League Div.One South	6	
Leeds City	West Riding County League Div.One	8	From West Riding County League Div.Two
Leeds Hyde Park	West Riding County League Div.One	8	
Leeds Medics & Dentists	West Riding County League Premier Div.	7	
Leeds Modernians	North East Regional League Premier Div.	5	From North East Regional League Div.One South
Leeds United	National League Div.One North	4	
Leek Town	East Midlands Regional League Premier Div.	5	
Leek Town Reserves	Staffordshire County League Div.One	8	From West Midlands Regional League Div.One North
Leicester City	Women's Super League 2	2	From Womens Super League
Leicester City Reserves	East Midlands Regional League Div.One South	6	
Leicester City Development	Leicestershire County League Div.Two	8	
Leigh Ramblers	Essex County League Premier Div.	7	
Leigh United	Essex County League Div.One	8	
Lemington	Northumberland County League Div.One	8	From Northumberland County League Div.Two
Leverington Sports	Cambridgeshire County League Div.One	7	
Lewes	National League Premier Div.South	3	
Leyton Orient	Eastern Regional League Div.One South	6	From Greater London County League Premier Div.
Lichfield City	West Midlands Regional League Premier Div.	5	From West Midlands Regional League Div.One North
Lillington Juniors	Birmingham County League Premier Div.	7	From Birmingham County League Div.One
Lincoln Development	Lincolnshire County Premier Div.	7	New club
Lincoln United	East Midlands Regional League Premier Div.	5	Formed as a merger of Lincoln City and Lincoln United
Linthorpe Academicals U21	North Riding League Women's Div.One	8	
Linton Granta	Cambridgeshire County League Div.Two	8	From Cambridgeshire County League Div.Three
Liphook United	Hampshire County League Div.One	7	From Hampshire County League Div.Two
Liverpool	Women's Super League	1	
Liverpool Feds	National League Premier Div.North	3	
London Bees	National League Div.One South East	4	
London City Lionesses	Women's Super League	1	
London Lions	Beds & Herts County League Premier Div.	7	From Beds & Herts County League Div.One
London Galaxy	Greater London County League Premier Div.	7	From Greater London County League Div.One North
Long Eaton United	East Midlands Regional League Div.One Central	6	
Long Eaton United Development	Derbyshire County League Div.One	7	
Long Itchington	West Midlands Regional League Div.One South	6	
Long Lane	South East Counties League Kent Div.One West	8	From South East Counties League Premier Div.
Long Melford	Suffolk County League Premiership	7	New club
Longfleet Lionesses	Dorset County League Women's Div.One	7	
Longfleet Lionesses Reserves	Dorset County League Women's Div.Two	8	New club
Longlevens	Gloucestershire County League Div.Two	8	From Gloucestershire County League Div.One
Longwell Green	Gloucestershire County League Div.Two	8	
Lostock St.Gerards	Lancashire County League Championship	8	
Loughborough Dynamo	Leicestershire County League Div.Two	8	New club
Loughborough Lightning	National League Premier Div.North	3	
Loughborough Foxes Vixens	East Midlands Regional League Premier Div.	5	
Loughborough Foxes Sapphires	Leicestershire County League Div.One	7	
Louth	Lincolnshire County Premier Div.	7	From Lincolnshire County League Championship
Lowdham	Nottinghamshire County League Div.Two	8	From Nottinghamshire County League Div.One
Lower Hopton	North East Regional League Div.One South	6	
Lowestoft Town	Norfolk County League Div.One	7	
Ludgvan	Cornwall County League Div.One	8	
Ludlow Town	Midwest Counties League Div.One	7	
Luton Town	National League Div.One South East	4	
Luton Town Development	Eastern Regional League Div.One North	6	From Greater London County League Premier Div.
Lye Town	National League Div.One Midlands	4	From West Midlands Regional League Premier Div.
Lye Town Reserves	Birmingham County League Premier Div.	7	
Lutterworth Athletic	Leicestershire County League Div.One	7	New club

=== M ===
Club	League/Division	Lvl	Change from 2025–26
MK United	Beds & Herts County League Div.One	8	
MSB Woolton	North West Regional League Div.One South	6	From North West Regional League Div.One Central
MSB Woolton Reserves	Liverpool County League Div.One	8	From Liverpool County League Div.Two
Macclesfield	Cheshire County League Premier Div.	7	From North West Regional League Div.One South
Maghull	Liverpool County League Premier Div.	7	
Maidenhead Nomads	Thames Valley Counties League Div.Two South	8	From Thames Valley Counties League Div.Three South
Maidenhead United	National League Div.One South West	4	
Maidstone United	London & S.East Regional League Div.One North	6	From South East Counties League Premier Div.
Maine Road	Greater Manchester County League Premier Div.	7	New club
Malet Lambert	East Riding County League Div.One	7	From East Riding County League Div.Two
Malmesbury Victoria	Wiltshire County League Premier Div.	7	From Wiltshire County League Development Div.
Manchester City	Women's Super League	1	
Manchester Laces Blue	Greater Manchester County League Div.One	8	
Manchester Rovers	Cheshire County League Championship	8	From Cheshire County League Championship East
Manchester United	Women's Super League	1	
Mancunian Unity	North West Regional League Premier Div.	5	
Mancunian Unity Reserves	North West Regional League Div.One Central	6	New club
Mangotsfield United	South West Regional League Div.One North	6	
Mangotsfield United Reserves	Gloucestershire County League Div.Two	8	
Manorcroft United	South East Counties League Surrey Premier Div.	8	
Mansfield Town	East Midlands Regional League Premier Div.	5	
Mansfield Town Development	Nottinghamshire County League Div.One	7	
March Town United	Cambridgeshire County League Div.One	7	From Cambridgeshire County League Div.Two
Margate	South East Counties League Premier Div.	7	
Marine	Liverpool County League Premier Div.	7	
Marine Reserves	Liverpool County League Div.One	8	New club
Marine Academy Plymouth	National League Div.One South West	4	
Marlborough Rovers	Leicestershire County League Div.Two	8	
Marlborough Town	Wiltshire County League Premier Div.	7	
Marlborough Town Development	Wiltshire County League Div One.	8	
Maypole	Birmingham County League Div.One	8	New club
Meden Vale Colts	Nottinghamshire County League Div.Two	8	From Nottinghamshire County League Div.Three
Melbourne Dynamo	East Midlands Regional League Div.One Central	6	
Melksham Town	Wiltshire County League Premier Div.	7	
Merstham	South East Counties League Surrey Premier Div.	8	
Middlesbrough	National League Premier Div.North	3	
Middlesbrough Girls	North Riding League Premier Div.	7	New club
Middlewich Town	Cheshire County League Championship	8	From Cheshire County League Premier Div.
Milford & Witley	South East Counties League Surrey Premier Div.	8	From South East Counties League Surrey Div.One
Millbrook	Southern Region League Div.One South	6	From Hampshire County League Div.One
Millmore Juniors	Sheffield & Hallamshire County League Div.One	7	From North East Regional League Div.One South
Millmore Juniors Reserves	Sheffield & Hallamshire County League Div.Two	8	
Millwall Lionesses	London & S.East Regional League Premier Div.	5	
Milton Keynes	National League Div.One South East	4	
Milton Keynes Development	Thames Valley Counties League Div.One	7	New club
Milton Keynes Irish	Northamptonshire County League Premier Div.	7	New club
Milton Keynes Irish Development	Northamptonshire County League Div.One	8	New club
Milton United (Staffs)	Staffordshire County League Premier Div.	7	
Minehead	Somerset County League Div.Two	8	From Somerset County League Div.Three South
Moneyfields	National League Div.One South West	4	
Montpelier Villa	London & S.East Regional League Div.One South	6	
Morecambe	North West Regional League Div.One North	6	
Morecambe Reserves	Lancashire County League Championship	8	From Lancashire County League Div.One North
Morley Town	West Riding County League Div.One	8	
Morpeth Town	Northumberland County League Premiership	7	
Mossley Hil Athletic	North West Regional League Div.One South	6	From North West Regional League Div.One Central
Moulton	Northamptonshire County League Premier Div.	7	
Mudeford Phoenix	Hampshire County League Div.One	7	
Mulbarton Wanderers	Eastern Regional League Div.One North	6	
Mulbarton Wanderers Reserves	Norfolk County League Div.One	7	

=== N ===
Club	League/Division	Lvl	Change from 2025–26
NN United	Northamptonshire County League Premier Div.	7	New club
Nailsea United	Somerset County League Div.One	7	
Nantwich Town	North West Regional League Premier Div.	5	From North West Regional League Div.One South
Nantwich Town Development	Cheshire County League Premier Div.	7	
Needham Market	Eastern Regional League Div.One North	6	From Eastern Regional League Div.One South
Needham Market Development	Suffolk County League Premiership	7	
Netherton United	East Midlands Regional League Div.One South	6	
Netherton United Reserves	Cambridgeshire County League Div.Two	8	
Nettleham	Lincolnshire County Premier Div.	7	New club
New Fordley Vixens	Northumberland County League Div.One	8	From Northumberland County League Div.Two
Newark Town	East Midlands Regional League Div.One North	6	
Newark Town Reserves	Nottinghamshire County League Div.Two	8	From Nottinghamshire County League Div.Three
Newcastle Benfield	Northumberland County League Div.One	8	New club
Newcastle Town	West Midlands Regional League Div.One North	6	
Newcastle United	Women's Super League 2	2	
Newcastle University IM	Northumberland County League Div.One	8	
Newent Town	Gloucestershire County League Div.Two	8	New club
Newhaven	London & S.East Regional League Premier Div.	5	
Newmarket Town	Eastern Regional League Div.One North	6	
Newmarket Town Development	Cambridgeshire County League Div.One	7	
Newport Pagnell Town	East Midlands Regional League Premier Div.	5	From East Midlands Regional League Div.One South
Newport Pagnell Town Development	Northamptonshire County League Premier Div.	7	
Newquay	South West Regional League Div.One South	6	From Cornwall County League Premier Div.
Newton Abbot Spurs	Devon County League North & East Div.	8	New club
Newton Aycliffe	Durham County League Div.One	8	From Durham County League Premier Div.
Newton-le-Willows	Cheshire County League Premier Div.	7	
North Ferriby	East Riding County League Div.One	7	
North Leigh	Thames Valley Counties League Div.Two North	8	
North Lindum Hawks	Lincolnshire County Championship	8	
North Shields Athletic	North East Regional League Div.One North	6	From Northumberland League Premiership
North Walsham Town	Norfolk County League Div.Two	8	From Norfolk County League Div.Three
Northallerton Town	North Riding League Women's Div.	7	
Northampton Kingsthorpe Jets Phoenix	Northamptonshire County League Premier Div.	7	From Northamptonshire County League Div.One (also name change - formerly Kingsthorpe Jets)
Northampton Town	National League Div.One Midlands	4	
Northampton Town Development	East Midlands Regional League Div.One South	6	
Martham	Norfolk County League Div.Two	8	
Northwich United	Cheshire County League Championship	8	New club
Northwich Victoria Vixens	Cheshire County League Premier Div.	7	
Norton & Stockton Ancients	National League Div.One North	4	
Norton & Stockton Ancients Reserves	North East Regional League Div.One North	6	
Norwich City	National League Premier Div.North	3	From National League Div.One South East
Nottingham Forest	Women's Super League 2	2	
Nottingham Trent University	East Midlands Regional League Premier Div.	5	From East Midlands Regional League Div.One Central
Nottingham Trent University Pink	Nottinghamshire County League Div.Two	8	From Nottinghamshire County League Div.One
Notts County	National League Div.One Midlands	4	
Notts County Development	East Midlands Regional League Div.One North	6	
Nuneaton Harriers	Birmingham County League Premier Div.	7	Name change - formerly Nuneaton Griff
Nunnery Wood United	Midwest Counties League Div.One	7	

=== O ===
Club	League/Division	Lvl	Change from 2025–26
Oakham United	East Midlands Regional League Div.One Central	6	From Leicestershire County League Div.One
Oakland Wolves	Beds & Herts County League Premier Div.	7	
Odd Down	Somerset County League Div.One	7	From Somerset County League Div.Two
Okehampton Argyle	Devon County League North & East Div.	8	
Old Malton St. Marys	North Riding League Div.One	8	
Old Wulfrunians	Birmingham County League Premier Div.	7	From Birmingham County League Div.One
Oldham Athletic	Greater Manchester County League Premier Div.	7	
Olney	Northamptonshire County League Div.One	8	
Olton Ravens	Birmingham County League Div.One	8	
Olveston United	Gloucestershire County League Div.One	7	
Ossett United	North East Regional League Premier Div.	5	
Ottery St. Mary	Devon County League North & East Div.	8	
Oughtibridge WM	Sheffield & Hallamshire County League Div.One	7	
Oxford City	Southern Region League Premier Div.	5	
Oxford City Development	Southern Region League Div.One North	6	
Oxford United	National League Premier Div.South	3	
Oxton	Cheshire County League Premier Div.	7	From Cheshire County League Championship
Oxted & District	South East Counties League Surrey Premier Div.	8	

=== P ===
Club	League/Division	Lvl	Change from 2025–26
Padstow United	Cornwall County League Div.One	8	
Pagham	Sussex County League Premier Div.	7	
Paignton Villa	Devon County League South & West Div.	8	
Park Regis	South East Counties League Kent Div.One East	8	
Park View	North East Regional League Div.One North	6	
Parkgate	Sheffield & Hallamshire County League Div.Two	8	New club
Parkwood Rangers	South East Counties League Div.One West	8	From South East Counties League Kent Div.One Central
Paulton Rovers	South West Regional League Div.One Central	6	From South West Regional League Div.One North
Paulton Rovers Reserves	Somerset County League Div.One	7	
Pelsall Villa Colts	Staffordshire County League Div.One	8	
Pen Mill	Somerset County League Div.One	7	
Penistone Church	Sheffield & Hallamshire County League Div.Two	8	
Penn & Tylers Green	Southern Region League Div.One North	6	
Penrith	North West Regional League Div.One North	6	
Penrith Pathway	Lancashire County League Premier Div.	7	From Lancashire County League Championship
Penwortham Town	Lancashire County League Premier Div.	7	
Pershore Town 88	Midwest Counties League Div.Two	8	New club
Peterborough United	National League Premier Div.North	3	From National League Div.One Midlands
Petts Wood & Holmesdale	South East Counties League Kent Div.One West	8	Name change - formerly Petts Wood
Phoenix Girls	Beds & Herts County League Div.One	8	New club
Petts Wood & Holmsdale Keets	Greater London County League Div.One South	8	Name change - formerly Holmesdale Keets
Pickering Town	North Riding League Premier Div.	7	From North Riding League Women's Div.One
Pilkington	Liverpool County League Premier Div.	7	From North West Regional League Div.One Central
Plainmoor	Devon County League South & West Div.	8	
Plymouth Argyle	National League Premier Div.South	3	
Plymouth Marjon	South West Regional League Div.One South	6	From Devon County League South & West Div.
Plymouth True Blues	Devon County League South & West Div.	8	
Plympton	Devon County League Premier Div.	7	
Ponteland United	North East Regional League Premier Div.	5	
Poole Borough	Dorset County League Women's Div.Two	8	New club
Poole Borough Reserves	Dorset County League Women's Div.Two	8	New club
Poole Town	South West Regional League Premier Div.	5	
Poole Town Reserves	Dorset County League Women's Div.One	7	
Port Vale	West Midlands Regional League Premier Div.	5	
Port Vale Reserves	Staffordshire County League Premier Div.	7	
Porthleven	Cornwall County League Div.One	8	From Cornwall County League Div.Two
Portishead	South West Regional League Premier Div.	5	From National League Div.One South West
Portishead Reserves	South West Regional League Div.One Central	6	From Somerset County League Div.One
Portishead "A"	Somerset County League Div.Two	8	
Portland	Dorset County League Women's Div.Two	8	New club
Portsmouth	National League Premier Div.South	3	From Women's Super League 2
Potters Bar Crusaders	Beds & Herts County League Premier Div.	7	New club
Poulton Vics	North West Regional League Premier Div.	5	
Preston North End	North West Regional League Premier Div.	5	From North West Regional League Div.One North
Pride Park	East Midlands Regional League Div.One Central	6	From Derbyshire County League Div.One
Prudhoe Town	Northumberland County League Premiership	7	
Purton Kingsdown	Wiltshire County League Premier Div.	7	

=== Q ===
Club	League/Division	Lvl	Change from 2025–26
Queens Park	Dorset County League Women's Div.One	7	New club
Queens Park Rangers	National League Div.One South East	4	
Queens Park Rangers Development	Greater London County League Div.One North	8	New club

=== R ===
Club	League/Division	Lvl	Change from 2025–26
Radcliffe	Lancashire County League Premier Div.	7	From North West Regional League Div.One Central
Radcliffe Olympic	Nottinghamshire County League Div.One	7	
Radcliffe Reserves	Lancashire County League Championship	8	
Rainford Athletic	Liverpool County League Div.One	8	
Ramsgate	South East Counties League Kent Div.One East	8	
Rangers Athletic	West Riding County League Div.One	8	
Reading	Southern Region League Premier Div.	5	
Real Bedford	National League Premier Div.South	3	
Real Bedford Development	Cambridgeshire County League Div.One	7	From Cambridgeshire County League Div.Two
Real Bedford Reserves	Eastern Regional League Div.One North	6	
Redcar Athletic	North Riding League Women's Div.	7	
Redcar Town	North East Regional League Div.One North	6	
Redcar Town Development	North Riding League Div.One	8	
Reddish North End Pinks	Greater Manchester County League Div.One	8	
Redditch Borough	West Midlands Regional League Premier Div.	5	
Redditch Borough Reserves	Midwest Counties League Div.One	7	
Redditch United	West Midlands Regional League Div.One South	6	
Redruth United	Cornwall County League Div.One	8	From Cornwall County League Premier Div.
Regents Park Rangers	Greater London County League Div.One South	8	
Ridgeway	South West Regional League Div.One South	6	From Dorset County League Women's Div.One
Ridgeway Black Pearls	Dorset County League Women's Div.Two	8	New club
Ringmer	Sussex County League Championship	8	From Sussex County League Div.One
River City	Leicestershire County League Div.One	7	From East Midlands Regional League Div.One South
Rochdale	North West Regional League Div.One Central	6	
Romsey Town	Hampshire County League Div.Two	8	From Hampshire County League Div.Three
Ross Juniors	Midwest Counties League Div.One	7	
Rossington Main	North East Regional League Div.One South	6	
Rossington Main Reserves	Sheffield & Hallamshire County League Div.Two	8	
Rotherham United	North East Regional League Premier Div.	5	From East Midlands Regional League Premier Div.
Rotherham United U23s	Sheffield & Hallamshire County League Div.One	7	
Royal Wootton Bassett Town	South West Regional League Premier Div.	5	From South West Regional League Div.One North
Royston Town	Eastern Regional League Premier Div.	5	
Royston Town Development	Cambridgeshire County League Div.One	7	
Rubery Juniors Ravens	Birmingham County League Div.One	8	
Rugby Borough	National League Premier Div.North	3	
Rugby Town	West Midlands Regional League Div.One North	6	
Ruislip Rangers	Thames Valley Counties League Div.One	7	
Runcorn Linnets	North West Regional League Div.One South	6	
Runcorn Saxons	Liverpool County League Premier Div.	7	
Rushall Olympic	Staffordshire County League Premier Div.	7	Rejoined club
Rushden	Northamptonshire County League Div.One	8	
Rushmoor Community	Hampshire County League Div.One	7	From Hampshire County League Div.Two
Ruston Sports	Lincolnshire County Premier Div.	7	

=== S ===
Club	League/Division	Lvl	Change from 2025–26
SE Dons	South East Counties League Kent Div.One West	8	New club
SJR Worksop	East Midlands Regional League Premier Div.	5	
SJR Worksop Development	Sheffield & Hallamshire County League Div.Two	8	
Saffron Dynamo	Leicestershire County League Div.One	7	
Saffron Walden Town	Cambridgeshire County League Div.Two	8	
Salford City Lionesses	North West Regional League Div.One Central	6	
Salisbury	Wiltshire County League Premier Div.	7	From Wiltshire County League Development Div.
Saltash Borough	Cornwall County League Premier Div.	7	
Saltash United	South West Regional League Premier Div.	5	
Saltdean United	National League Div.One South East	4	From London & S.East Regional League Premier Div.
Saltdean United Development	London & S.East Regional League Div.One South	6	
Saltford	Gloucestershire County League Div.One	7	New club
Sandbach United	Cheshire County League Championship	8	From Cheshire County League Premier Div.
Saxmundham Sports	Suffolk County League Championship	8	
Seaham Coast	Durham County League Div.One	8	From Durham County League Div.Two
Seaton Sluice	Northumberland County League Div.One	8	From Northumberland County League Div.Two
Sevenoaks Town	London & S.East Regional League Div.One South	6	
Shaftsbury	Dorset County League Women's Div.One	7	From Southern Region League Div.One South
Shaftsbury Reserves	Dorset County League Women's Div.Two	8	New club
Shanklin	Hampshire County League Div.One	7	
Sheffield FC	National League Div.One Midlands	4	
Sheffield United	Women's Super League 2	2	
Sheffield United Community Foundation	Sheffield & Hallamshire County League Div.One|7		
Sheffield Wednesday	North East Regional League Div.One South	6	
Sheffield Wednesday Reserves	Sheffield & Hallamshire County League Div.Two	8	
Sheppey United	South East Counties League Kent Div.One East	8	From South East Counties League Kent Div.One Central
Sherborne Town	South West Regional League Premier Div.	5	
Sherborne Town Development	Dorset County League Women's Div.One	7	
Sherburn White Rose	West Riding County League Premier Div.	7	
Sherwood	East Midlands Regional League Div.One Central	6	
Sherwood Colliery	Nottinghamshire County League Div.One	7	From Nottinghamshire County League Div.Two
Sherwood Development	Nottinghamshire County League Div.Two	8	
Shifnal Town	West Midlands Regional League Premier Div.	5	
Shirebrook Rangers	Nottinghamshire County League Div.Two	8	
Sholing	Southern Region League Premier Div.	5	
Sholing Reserves	Hampshire County League Div.Two	8	From Hampshire County League Div.Four
Shrewsbury Town	West Midlands Regional League Premier Div.	5	
Shrewsbury Up & Comers	West Midlands Regional League Div.One North	6	New club
Shrublands 1988	Norfolk County League Div.One	7	From Norfolk County League Div.Two
Signal Box Frankfort	Devon County League Premier Div.	7	
Silsden	West Riding County League Premier Div.	7	
Skegness Town	Lincolnshire County Premier Div.	7	New club
Skipton Town	West Riding County League Div.One	8	From West Riding County League Premier Div.
Sleaford Town	Lincolnshire County Premier Div.	7	From Lincolnshire County League Championship
Sleetmoor United	Derbyshire County League Div.Two	8	
Slindon	Sussex County League Championship	8	From Sussex County League Div.One
Slough Town	Southern Region League Div.One North	6	
Socrates	Sheffield & Hallamshire County League Div.Two	8	
Soham Town Rangers	Cambridgeshire County League Div.One	7	
Solihull Moors	East Midlands Regional League Premier Div.	5	
Solihull Moors Foundation Development	Birmingham County League Premier Div.	7	Rejoined club
South London	Greater London County League Premier Div.	7	
South London Reserves	Greater London County League Div.One South	8	
South Park Rangers	North Riding League Women's Div.One	8	
South Shields	North East Regional League Premier Div.	5	
South West London Diamonds	Greater London County League Div.One South	8	New club
South Woodham Ferrers	Essex County League Div.One	8	
Southampton	Women's Super League 2	2	
Southampton Women's	Southern Region League Premier Div.	5	
Southend United CSC	Eastern Regional League Div.One South	6	
Southmead	Gloucestershire County League Div.One	7	
Southport	Liverpool County League One	8	From Liverpool County League Premier Div.
Southwell City	Nottinghamshire County League Div.Two	8	
Spalding United	East Midlands Regional League Div.One South	6	From Cambridgeshire County League Div.One
Spencer Mill	Northamptonshire County League Div.One	8	New club
Spennymoor Town	North East Regional League Premier Div.	5	
Spennymoor Town Reserves	Durham County League Premier Div.	7	
Spennymoor Town Development	Durham County League Div.One	8	
Sport London E Benfica	London & S.East Regional League Div.One North	6	From London & S.East Regional League Premier Div
Sporting Club Inkberrow	Midwest Counties League Div.One	7	Name change - formerly Inkberrow Eagles
Sporting Duet	Greater London County League Premier Div.	7	
Sporting Khalsa	National League Div.One Midlands	4	From National League Premier Div.North
Sprowston	Norfolk County League Div.One	7	
St. Agnes	South West Regional League Div.One South	6	From Cornwall County League Premier Div.
St. Agnes Reserves	Cornwall County League Div.One	8	
St. Albans City	Eastern Regional League Premier Div.	5	
St. Dennis	Cornwall County League Premier Div.	7	
St. Ives Town	Cambridgeshire County League Div.Two	8	
St. Micheals	Liverpool County League Premier Div.	7	From Liverpool County League Div.One
Stafford Rangers	Staffordshire County League Div.One	8	Returned club
Stafford Town	Staffordshire County League Premier Div.	7	
Staffordshire Victoria	Staffordshire County League Div.One	8	
Stamford	East Midlands Regional League Premier Div.	5	
Stanground Cardea Sports	East Midlands Regional League Div.One South	6	
Stanground Cardea Sports Reserves	Cambridgeshire County League Div.Two	8	
Stanton Ilkeston	Derbyshire County League Div.Two	8	
Stapenhill	Derbyshire County League Div.Two	8	
Staplegrove	Somerset County League Div.Two	8	
Staveley MW	East Midlands Regional League Div.One North	6	From Sheffield & Hallamshire County League Div.One
Staveley MW Reserves	Sheffield & Hallamshire County League Div.One	7	From Sheffield & Hallamshire County League Div.Two
Staverton Rangers	Wiltshire County League Div One.	8	
Stevenage	National League Div.One South East	4	From Eastern Regional League Premier Div.
Stevenage Development	Eastern Regional League Div.One North	6	
Steyning Town Community	London & S.East Regional League Div.One South	6	
Sticker	South West Regional League Div.One South	6	From Cornwall County League Premier Div.
Stockport County	National League Div.One North	4	
Stockport County Development	North West Regional League Div.One Central	6	From Cheshire County League Premier Div.
Stockton Town	North East Regional League Div.One North	6	
Stocksbridge Park Steels	Sheffield & Hallamshire County League Div.One	7	
Stockwood Wanderers	South West Regional League Div.One Central	6	From South West Regional League Div.One North
Stoke City	National League Premier Div.North	3	
Stoke Gabriel & Torbay Police	Devon County League Premier Div.	7	
Stone Old Alleynians	Staffordshire County League Premier Div.	7	
Stotfold	Beds & Herts County League Div.One	8	From Bedfordshire & Hertfordshire County League Premier Div.
Stone Old Alleynians Development	Staffordshire County League Div.One	8	
Stourbridge	East Midlands Regional League Premier Div.	5	From National League Div.One Midlands
Stowmarket Town	Suffolk County League Championship	8	New club
Stowupland Falcons	Suffolk County League Premiership	7	
Street	Somerset County League Div.Two	8	
Stretford Paddock	Greater Manchester County League Premier Div.	7	From Greater Manchester County League Div.One
Sunderland	Women's Super League 2	2	
Sunderland West End	North East Regional League Div.One North	6	From North East Regional League Premier Div.
Sutton Coldfield Town	National League Div.One Midlands	4	
Sutton Rangers	Cheshire County League Championship	8	
Sutton United (Birmingham)	West Midlands Regional League Div.One North	6	From Birmingham County League Premier Div.
Sutton United (London)	London & S.East Regional League Premier Div.	5	
Sutton United (London) Reserves	South East Counties League Surrey Premier Div.	8	
Swanage Town & Herston	Dorset County League Women's Div.One	7	New club
Swindon Supermarine	Wiltshire County League Div One.	8	From Wiltshire County League Premier Div.
Swindon Town	National League Premier Div.South	3	From National League Div.One South West

=== T ===
Club	League/Division	Lvl	Change from 2025–26
TD Shipley	Sussex County League Premier Div.	7	From Sussex County League Championship
TIBS	North Riding League Premier Div.	7	From North Riding League Women's Div.One
Tamworth	Birmingham County League Premier Div.	7	From West Midlands Regional League Div.One South
Taunton Town	Somerset County League Div.Two	8	From Somerset County League Div.Three South
Tavistock Association	Devon County League South & West Div.	8	
Tees	North Riding League Women's Div.One	8	New club
Teignmouth	Devon County League Premier Div.	7	
Telford Town	West Midlands Regional League Div.One North	6	
Thackley	North East Regional League Div.One South	6	From West Riding County League Premier Div.
Thame United	Thames Valley Counties League Div.Two North	8	
Thatcham & Newbury Town Blues	Thames Valley Counties League Div.Two South	8	From Thames Valley Counties League Div.Three West
Thatcham Town Kingfinders	Thames Valley Counties League Div.Two South	8	New club
The View	Sussex County League Premier Div.	7	From Sussex County League Championship
Thetford Town	Eastern Regional League Div.One North	6	
Thirsk Falcons	North Riding League Women's Div.One	8	New club
Thornaby	National League Div.One North	4	From North East Regional League Premier Div.
Thrapston	East Midlands Regional League Div.One South	6	
Three Bridges	London & S.East Regional League Div.One South	6	From Sussex County League Premier Div.
Three Bridges	Sussex County League Championship	8	New club
Thurmaston DPC	East Midlands Regional League Div.One Central	6	From Leicestershire County League Div.One
Thurmaston DPC Kits	Leicestershire County League Div.Two	8	
Thurrock Thameside	Essex County League Premier Div.	7	New club
Thurrock Borough	Essex County League Div.One	8	New club
Tigers	Essex County League Div.One	8	From Essex County League Premier Div.
Tiki Taka	Greater Manchester County League Div.One	8	From Greater Manchester County League Div.Two
Tilehurst Panthers	Southern Region League Div.One North	6	
Tilehurst Panthers Reserves	Thames Valley Counties League Div.Two South	8	From Thames Valley Counties League Div.Three West
Tiverton Town	Devon County League Premier Div.	7	New club
Toby	Eastern Regional League Div.One South	6	
Tonbridge Angels	London & S.East Regional League Div.One South	6	From South East Counties League Premier Div.
Tooting Bec	London & S.East Regional League Div.One North	6	From Greater London County League Premier Div.
Tooting Bec Reserves	Greater London County League Div.One South	8	From Greater London County League Div.Two Central/South
Torquay United	National League Div.One South West	4	From South West Regional League Premier Div.
Tottenham Hotspur	Women's Super League	1	
Towcester Town	Northamptonshire County League Div.One	8	New club
Tower Hamlets	Greater London County League Div.One North	8	From Greater London County League Div.Two North
Tower Hill	Thames Valley Counties League Div.Two North	8	
Tranmere Rovers	North West Regional League Premier Div.	5	
Tranmere Rovers Reserves	North West Regional League Div.One South	6	From Liverpool County League Premier Div.
Trooper	Birmingham County League Div.One	8	From Birmingham County League Div.Three
Tunbridge Wells Foresters	South East Counties League Premier Div.	7	

=== U ===
Club	League/Division	Lvl	Change from 2025–26
UCL Academicals	Greater London County League Premier Div.	7	Name change - formerly London Academicals
UDA Chester Valkyrie	Cheshire County League Championship	8	New club
Underwood Villa	Nottinghamshire County League Div.Two	8	
United Dragons	Greater London County League Premier Div.	7	From Greater London County League Div.One North
United Services Portsmouth	Hampshire County League Div.One	7	
University of East Anglia	Norfolk County League Div.One	7	
University of Exeter	Devon County League Premier Div.	7	From Devon County League North & East Div.
University of Exeter 2nd	Devon County League North & East Div.	8	New club
University of Nottingham	East Midlands Regional League Div.One Central	6	
University of Plymouth	Devon County League South & West Div.	8	New club

=== V ===
Club	League/Division	Lvl	Change from 2025–26
Vale Congleton	Cheshire County League Championship	8	New club
Vauxhall Motors	Liverpool County League Premier Div.	7	From Cheshire County League Championship

=== W ===
Club	League/Division	Lvl	Change from 2025–26
Wadebridge Town	Cornwall County Premier Div.	7	From Cornwall County League Div.One
Walker Central	Northumberland County League Div.One	8	New club
Wallingford & Crowmarsh	Thames Valley Counties League Div.One	7	
Wallsend BC	North East Regional League Premier Div.	5	
Walsall	West Midlands Regional League Div.One North	6	
Walsall Wood	Staffordshire County League Premier Div.	7	From West Midlands Regional League Div.One North
Walton & Hersham	South East Counties League Surrey Premier Div.	8	New club
Wantage Town	Thames Valley Counties League Div.Two North	8	
Ware United	Beds & Herts County League Premier Div.	7	
Warrington Rylands	Liverpool County League Div.One	8	
Warrington Town	North West Regional League Div.One South	6	
Washington	North East Regional League Div.One North	6	
Waterbeach Colts	Cambridgeshire County League Div.Two	8	From Cambridgeshire County League Div.One
Watford	Women's Super League 2	2	From National League Premier Div. South
Watford Reserves	Eastern Regional League Premier Div.	5	
Watford Development	Beds & Herts County League Premier Div.	7	From Beds & Herts County League Div.One
Waveney	Norfolk County League Div.Two	8	From Norfolk County League Div.One
Wealdstone	Greater London County League Div.One North	8	From Greater London County League Div.Two North
Welland	Midwest Counties League Div.Two	8	From Midwest Counties League Div.One
Welling United	South East Counties League Kent Div.One West	8	From Beds & Herts County League Div.Three
Wellingborough Town	East Midlands Regional League Div.One South	6	From East Midlands Regional League Premier Div.
Wellington Wildcats	Somerset County League Div.One	7	
Wells City	South West Regional League Div.One Central	6	From South West Regional League Div.One South
Wendron United	Cornwall County League Div.One	8	
West Allotment Celtic	Northumberland County League Premiership	7	
West Bridgford Colts	Nottinghamshire County League Div.One	7	From East Midlands Regional League Div.One Central
West Bromwich Albion	National League Premier Div.North	3	
West Didsbury & Chorlton	North West Regional League Premier Div.	5	
West Didsbury & Chorlton Reserves	North West Regional League Div.One South	6	From Greater Manchester County League Premier Div.
West Ham United	Women's Super League	1	
West Kirby United	Liverpool County League Div.One	8	From Liverpool County League Div.Two
Westbury Youth	Wiltshire County League Premier Div.	7	
Westfield	Sussex County League Championship	8	New club
Weston-super-Mare	South West Regional League Div.One Central	6	From South West Regional League Div.One South
Weymouth	Dorset County League Women's Div.One	7	From South West Regional League Div.One South
Whinney Hill	Lancashire County League Championship	8	From Lancashire County League Div.One South/East
Whitchurch United	Southern Region League Div.One South	6	From South West Regional League Div.One North
Whitchurch	South West Regional League Div.One Central	6	From South West Regional League Div.One North
Whitchurch Alport	West Midlands Regional League Div.One North	6	
Whitehaven	Lancashire County League Premier Div.	7	
Whitehawk	Sussex County League Championship	8	From Sussex County League Div.One
Whitley Bay Lionesses	Northumberland County League Div.One	8	
Whittlesey Athletic	Cambridgeshire County League Div.Two	8	
Wickford Town	Essex County League Div.One	8	
Wigan Athleti	North West Regional League Div.One North	6	
Wigan Athletic Ladies	North West Regional League Div.One Central	6	
Wigginton Grasshoppers	North Riding League Women's Premier Div.	7	
Wight Eagles	Hampshire County League Div.Two	8	
Wilmslow Albion	Greater Manchester County League Premier Div.	7	From Greater Manchester County League Div.One
Wimborne Town	Southern Region League Div.One South	6	
Wimborne Town Reserves	Dorset County League Women's Div.One	7	
Wincanton Town	Somerset County League Div.Two	8	
Winchester City Flyers	Southern Region League Premier Div.	5	
Winchester City Flyers Reds	Hampshire County League Div.Two	8	
Windsor & Eton	Thames Valley Counties League Div.One	7	From Thames Valley Counties League Div.Two South
Winchester City Flyers Reserves	Hampshire County League Div.One	7	
Winsford Town	Cheshire County League Premier Div.	7	
Winton Wanderers	Greater Manchester County League Premier Div.	7	
Wirksworth Colts	Derbyshire County League Div.One	7	
Wirral Phoenix	North West Regional League Div.One South	6	
Wirral Phoenix Development	Liverpool County League Div.One	8	
Wirral United	North West Regional League Div.One South	6	From Cheshire County League Premier Div.
Woburn & Wavendon	Beds & Herts County League Div.One	8	
Wolverhampton Wanderers	Women's Super League 2	2	From National League Premier Div. North
Wolviston	Durham County League Premier Div.	7	New club
Wombourne Allstars	Birmingham County League Div.One	8	New club
Wolverley	Midwest Counties League Div.Two	8	New club
Woodbridge Town	Suffolk County League Premiership	7	
Woodhall Spa United	Lincolnshire County Premier Div.	7	
Woodley United	Southern Region League Premier Div.	5	
Wootton Blue Cross Lionesses	Beds & Herts County League Premier Div.	7	
Worcester City	National League Div.One Midlands	4	
Worcester City Community	Midwest Counties League Div.Two	8	New club
Worcester City U21s	West Midlands Regional League Div.One South	6	
Worcester City Lionesses	Midwest Counties League Div.One	7	New club
Worcester United	Midwest Counties League Div.One	7	
Workington Town	North West Regional League Div.One North	6	
Workington Town Reserves	Lancashire County League Premier Div.	7	From Lancashire County League Championship
Wormley Rovers	Eastern Regional League Div.One South	6	
Worthing	London & S.East Regional League Premier Div.	5	From National League Div.One South West
Worthing Town	Sussex County League Championship	8	
Wroxham	Eastern Regional League Premier Div.	5	
Wycombe Wanderers	National League Div.One South West	4	From Southern Region League Premier Div.
Wyke Wanderers	West Riding County League Premier Div.	7	
Wyre Forest Phoenix	Midwest Counties League Div.Two	8	From Midwest Counties League Div.One
Wyrley	Staffordshire County League Div.One	8	
Wythenshawe	National League Div.One Midlands	4	From National League Div.One North
Wythenshawe 2nds	Cheshire County League Premier Div.	7	
Wythenshawe Town	North West Regional League Div.One Central	6	New club

=== Y ===
Club	League/Division	Lvl	Change from 2025–26
YP	East Midlands Regional League Div.One North	6	From Sheffield & Hallamshire County League Div.One
Yate Town	South West Regional League Premier Div.	5	New club
Yateley United	Thames Valley Counties League Div.Two South	8	From Thames Valley Counties League Div.One
Yeovil Town	South West Regional League Premier Div.	5	From South West Regional League Div.One South
York City	National League Div.One North	4	
York City Development	North East Regional League Div.One South	6	
York Railway Institute	North East Regional League Premier Div.	5	
York Railway Institute Reserves	North Riding League Div.One	8	

== See also ==
- Women's association football
- List of women's national football teams
- List of women's football teams
- International competitions in women's association football
