= Midwest Counties Female Football League =

- Founded: 2009
- Country: England
- Divisions: 1 (current season)
- Number of clubs: 13 (current season)
- Level on pyramid: 7
- Promotion to: West Midlands Regional Women's Football League Division One
- Current champions: Westfields Women (2020-2021)
- Website: Official website

The Midwest Counties Female Football League is a women's association football league in England. The competition covers the counties of Herefordshire, Shropshire and Worcestershire. The league consists of three adult divisions. It is at level 7 of the women's pyramid. It promotes to the West Midlands Regional Women's Football League Division One, and does not relegate to any league. Matches are played on Sundays.

== Teams ==
The teams that have competed during the 2022-23 season were:

=== Division One ===
- Areley Kings Ladies
- Bromsgrove Sporting Ladies
- Cradley Town D C Ladies
- Hereford Ladies
- Inkberrow Eagles Ladies
- Kidderminster United Women
- Ludlow Town Ladies
- Malvern Town FC Women
- Meadow Park Women
- TDMS Ladies
- Ross Juniors Women
- Welland Ladies
- Wyre Forest Phoenix Ladies
