= Dorset Women's Football League =

- Country: England
- Divisions: 2
- Number of clubs: 22
- Level on pyramid: 7 & 8
- Promotion to: South West Regional Women's Football League Division One
- Current champions: Ridgeway Ladies (2025–26)
- Website: Official website

The Dorset Women's Football League is a football league which sits at level 7 and 8 of the league structure of women's football in England. It was formed for the 2021–22 Season from the previous Dorset FA Women's League and is part of and supported by the Dorset Football League.

The winner of division one is eligible for promotion to Division One of the South West Regional Women's Football League and there is no relegation from this division as there are no leagues ranked below this one in the pyramid system.

The 2025–26 season saw Ridgeway Ladies win the title.

== Teams ==
The teams competing in the league during the 2026–27 season are:

Division 1

- Bournemouth Manor Ladies
- Bournemouth Poppies Women
- Bridport FC Women
- Dorchester Town Ladies
- Longfleet FC Lionesses
- Poole Town Ladies Development
- Queens Park Ladies
- Shaftesbury Ladies
- Sherborne Town Ladies Development
- Swanage Town And Herston Women
- Weymouth FC Women

Division 2

- Bournemouth Electric Women
- Broadstone Women
- Cobham Sports FC Women
- Dexter Sports Youth Women
- Dorchester Town Ladies Reserves
- Longfleet FC Lionesses Development
- Poole Borough Ladies
- Poole Borough Ladies Reserves
- Portland United Youth Ladies
- Ridgeway Ladies Black Pearls
- Shaftesbury FC Ladies Reserves

== Former champions ==
Season	Division 1		Division 2	
Season	Champion	Runner-up	Champion	Runner-up
2025–26	Ridgeway Ladies	Bournemouth Poppies Women	Swanage Town And Herston Women	Weymouth FC Women
2024–25	Shaftesbury Ladies	Dorchester Town Ladies	Sherborne Town Ladies Reserves	Bournemouth Manor Ladies
2023–24	Wimborne Town FC Womens	Poole Town Ladies Reserves	Not contested	
2022–23	Shaftesbury Town Ladies	Ridgeway Ladies	Not contested	
2021–22	Weymouth FC Women	Poole Town Ladies Reserves	Not contested	
2020–21	Holt United Ladies	Weymouth Women	Not contested	
2019–20	Season null and void		Not contested	
2018–19	Sherborne Town Ladies	Merley Cobham Sports Youth Ladies	Not contested	
2017–18	Dorchester Town Ladies	Wareham Rangers Ladies	Not contested	
2016–17	Bere Regis Women	Dorchester Town Ladies	Not contested	
2015–16	Dorchester Town Ladies	Wimborne Town Ladies	Not contested	
2014–15	Portland United Youth Women	Dorchester Town Ladies	Not contested	
2013–14	Dorchester Town Ladies	Portland United Youth Women	Not contested	
2012–13	Dorchester Town Ladies	Poole Town Ladies Reserves	Not contested	
2011–12	Dorchester Town Ladies	Weymouth Ladies	Not contested	
2010–11	Blandford United	Purbeck Ladies	Not contested	
