= Eastern Region Women's Football League =

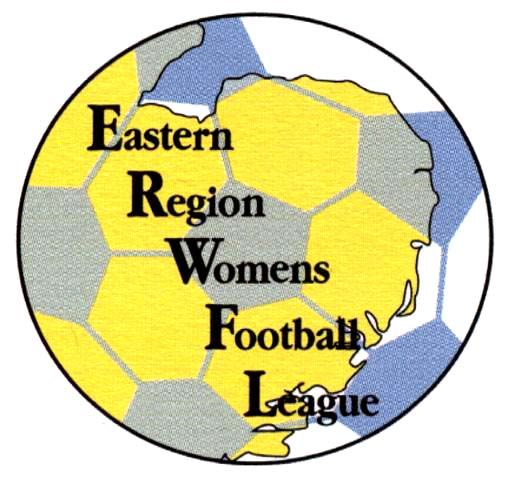
- Founded: 1990
- Country: England
- Divisions: 3 (current season)
- Number of clubs: 36 (current season)
- Level on pyramid: 5 & 6
- Promotion to: FA Women's National League Division One South East
- Relegation to: Bedfordshire and Hertfordshire County Girls and Women's Football League Division One; Cambridgeshire Women's & Girls County Football League Premiership; Essex County Women's League Premier Division; Norfolk Women's & Girls Football League Division One; Suffolk Girls and Women's Football League
- League cup: 2025-26 - Stevenage FCW
- Current champions: Stevenage FCW (Premier Division) Histon FC (Division One North) Hashtag United Reserves (Division One South) (2025-26)
- Top scorer: Premier Division Sarah Wiltshire (Stevenage FCW) 55 Division One North Evie Nicholls (Histon FC) 38 Division One South Chelise Fleming (Hashtag United Reserves) 35
- Website: https://fulltime.thefa.com/index.html?league=524403811

The Eastern Region Women's Football League is at the fifth and sixth levels of the English women's football pyramid, with the seven other Regional Leagues – London & SE, Southern, South West, East Mids, West Mids, North East and North West. The Eastern Region Women's Football League feeds directly into the FA Women's National League Division One South East, and lies above the Bedfordshire and Hertfordshire Football League, Cambridgeshire Football League, Essex County League, Norfolk Football League, and Suffolk Football League in the pyramid. The pyramid structure was founded in 1998.

The Eastern Region Women's Football League includes teams from the counties of Bedfordshire, Cambridgeshire, Essex, Hertfordshire, Norfolk and Suffolk, plus a team each from London and Northamptonshire who were part of the league prior to the reorganisation of the women's football pyramid.

== Teams ==
=== Premier Division ===
| Club | Home ground | Capacity |
|---|---|---|
| Atlético London | The Techsoc.com Stadium | 3,500 |
| Bowers & Pitsea Ladies FC | Len Salmon Stadium | 3,500 |
| Dussindale & Hellesdon Rovers Women FC | The Nest | 1,000 |
| Enfield Town L.F.C. | Queen Elizabeth II Stadium | 2,500 |
| Haringey Borough FC Women | Coles Park | 1,000 |
| Harpenden Town FC Women | Rothamsted Park | 1,000 |
| Hutton FC Ladies | Hannakins Farm Community Centre | |
| Royston Town FC Women | Garden Walk | 5,000 |
| St Albans City FC Women | Clarence Park | 5,007 |
| Stevenage FC Women | Herts County Ground | 1,500 |
| Watford Ladies FC Development | Broadwater | 2,500 |
| Wroxham FC Women | Trafford Park | 2,500 |

Location of the ERWFL Premier Division clubs for the 2025–26 season

=== Division One North ===
| Club | Home ground | Capacity |
|---|---|---|
| Biggleswade United FC Ladies | The Verdant Stadium | 2,000 |
| Cambridge City FC Ladies | Sawston Stadium | 3,000 |
| Colney Heath Ladies FC | The Recreation Ground | 1,000 |
| Dunstable Town Lionesses | Creasey Park Drive | 3,065 |
| Fulbourn Institute Bluebirds | Fulbourn Recreation Ground | 1,000 |
| Histon FC Ladies | Bridge Road | 3,800 |
| Hitchin Belles | The Priory School | |
| Mulbarton Wanderers FC Women | Mulberry Park | 2,000 |
| Newmarket Town FC Ladies | Cricket Field Road | 2,750 |
| Real Bedford FC Ladies Reserves | Hillgrounds Leisure Stadium (Home of Kempston Rovers FC) | 2,000 |
| Stevenage FC Women Development | Hertfordshire FA County Ground | 1,500 |
| Thetford Town FC Ladies | Mundford Road | 2,000 |

Location of the ERWFL Division One North clubs for the 2025–26 season

=== Division One South ===
| Club | Home ground | Capacity |
|---|---|---|
| Brentwood Town Ladies | The Arena | 1,000 |
| Chelmsford City FC Women | Melbourne Stadium | 3,000 |
| Colchester United Women | Colchester Garrison | |
| Hashtag United Women Reserves | Woodlands School | |
| Hertford Town FC Women | Hertingfordbury Park | 6,500 |
| Needham Market FC Women | Bloomfields | 4,000 |
| Southend United Ladies | Garon Park | 700 |
| Stanway Pegasus Ladies FC | Shrub End Sports Ground | |
| Toby Ladies FC | Barleylands Farm | |
| Wormley Rovers Ladies FC | Wormley Playing Fields | |

Location of the ERWFL Division One South clubs for the 2025–26 season

== Previous winners ==
| Season | First Division | | |
| 1990-91 | Town and Country | | |
| Season | Premier Division | Division West | |
| 1991-92 | Hemel Hempstead* | Luton Town | |
| Season | Premier Division | Division 1 | Division 2 |
| 1992-93 | Luton Town | Stalham Seahawks | Unknown |
| 1993-94 | Dunstable | St Germaine | Cambridge United |
| 1994-95 | Canary Racers | Norwich United | Clacton |
| 1995-96 | Canary Racers | Stalham Seahwaks | Lowestoft |
| 1996-97 | Canary Racers | Colchester United | Huntingdon |
| Season | Premier Division | Division 1 | Division 2 |
| 1997-98 | Canary Racers | HP Needham Market | Southwold (North East) Stanway (South East) Unknown (West) |
| 1998-99 | Needham Market | Pye | Cambridge Academicals (North) Heath Sports (South) |
| 1999–2000 | Chelmsford City | Royston Town | Woodbridge Town |
| 2000–01 | Cambridge Academicals | Haverhill Rovers | Wollaston Victoria |
| 2001–02 | Colchester United | Cambridge Kestrels | Stevenage Vixens |
| 2002–03 | Rushden & Diamonds | Northampton Town | Cambridge City Res. |
| 2003–04 | Northampton Town | Stevenage Vixens | Eye United |
| Season | Premier Div Winner | Div 1 East Winner | Div 1 West Winner |
| 2004–05 | Colchester United | Fakenham & Aylsham | Peterborough |
| 2005–06 | Norwich Canaries | Haverhill Rovers | AFC Kempston |
| 2006–07 | Cambridge City | Hethersett Athletic | Bedford Ladies |
| Season | Premier Div Winner | Div 1 South Winner | Div 1 North Winner |
| 2007–08 | Norwich Canaries | Chelmsford City | Kettering Town |
| 2008–09 | Dagenham & Redbridge | Braintree Town | West Lynn |
| 2009–10 | Braintree Town | Arlesey Town | Kettering Town |
| 2010–11 | Brentwood Town | C&K Basildon | Thorpe United |
| 2011–12 | Arlesey Town | Colchester Town | Great Shelford |
| 2012–13 | C & K Basildon | Leighton United | Lowestoft Town |
| 2013–14 | Bedford | AFC Dunstable | Acle Utd |
| 2014–15 | Lowestoft Town | Southendian Ladies | Bar Hill |
| Season | Premier Div Winner | Div 1 East Winner | Div 1 West Winner |
| 2015–16 | Stevenage | Writtle | Royston Town |
| Season | Premier Div Winner | Div 1 Winner | |
| 2016-17 | Haringey Borough Women's FC | Cambridge City Ladies FC | |
| Season | Premier Div Winner | Div 1 South Winner | Div 1 North Winner |
| 2017-18 | Billericay Town | Stevenage Reserves | Wymondham Town |
| Season | Premier Div Winner | Div 1 Winner | |
| 2018-19 | Cambridge City Ladies FC | St Ives Town Ladies FC | |
| Season | Premier Div Winner | Div 1 South Winner | Div 1 North Winner |
| 2019-20 | Cancelled | Cancelled | Cancelled |
| 2020-21 | Cancelled | Cancelled | Cancelled |
| 2021-22 | Wymondham Town | AFC Sudbury | Needham Market |
| 2022-23 | AFC Sudbury | Barking | AFC Dunstable |
| 2023-24 | Real Bedford | Watford Development | Dussindale & Hellesdon Rovers |
| 2024-25 | Luton Town Ladies | Harpenden Town | Hutton |
| 2025-26 | Stevenage FCW | Histon FC | Hashtag United Reserves |

*The league trophy engraving states Hemel Hempstead won the inaugural Premier Division in 1991/91 (sic) which is likely to be 1991/92

== League Cups ==
| Season | League Cup | League Plate | Lisa Slater Memorial Shield |
|---|---|---|---|
| 1999-00 | Pye | | |
| 2000-01 | Rushden & Diamonds | | |
| 2001-02 | | | |
| 2002-03 | Northampton Town | | |
| 2003-04 | Northampton Town | | |
| 2004-05 | Cambridge United | Peterborough | Chelmsford City |
| 2005-06 | Norwich Canaries | AFC Kempston Rovers | Stanway |
| 2006-07 | Peterborough | Sawbridgeworth Town | Bedford & District |
| 2007-08 | Heathersett Athletic | Brentwood Town | Cambridge Rangers |
| 2008-09 | Heathersett Athletic | | |
| 2009-10 | Heathersett Athletic | | |
| 2010-11 | Stevenage Ladies | | |
| 2011-12 | Billericay Town | | |
| 2012-13 | Billericay Town | East Thurrock United | |
| 2013-14 | Great Shelford | Royston Town | |
| 2014-15 | Lowestoft Town | Royston Town | |
| 2015-16 | Colchester Town | Writtle Ladies | |
| 2016-17 | Haringey Borough | Hutton | |
| 2017-18 | Acle United | Hutton | |
| 2018-19 | Cambridge City Ladies | Newmarket Town Ladies | |
| 2019-20 | Not held due to COVID-19 pandemic | | |
| 2020-21 | Royston Town** | | |
| 2021-22 | Wymondham Town FC | AFC Sudbury | |
| 2022-23 | Luton Town L.F.C. | Hutton | |
| 2023-24 | Real Bedford | Wormley Rovers | |
| 2024-25 | Luton Town L.F.C. | Hutton | |
| 2025-26 | Stevenage FCW | Haringey Borough | |

**League Trophy engraving states Royston won it this year.
