= Devon Women's Football League =

- Founded: 1996
- Country: England
- Divisions: 2
- Number of clubs: 17
- Level on pyramid: 7 and 8
- Promotion to: South West Regional Women's Football League Division One
- Current champions: Activate (Premier Division) (2015–16)
- Website: Official website

The Devon Women's Football League is an association football league for women in Devon, South West England. It consists of two divisions, Premier and Division One, which sit at levels seven and eight of the English women's football league structure.

== History ==
The league was formed in 1996, at which point it sat below the now-defunct South West Combination in the league structure. Since then women's football in England has undergone a major restructuring. In 2011 the FA Women's Super League (WSL) was introduced at the top of the game, then a second division was added to the WSL in 2014. At this time the FA Women's Premier League National Division (formerly the second level of women's football) was scrapped, along with the four Combination leagues that sat below the Premier League. The Premier League Northern and Southern divisions remained at level 3 of the league structure, with four new regional divisions of the Premier League below them at level 4.

The eight regional women's football leagues established in 1990 remained, their divisions at levels 5 and 6. The Devon Women's Football League's top division is at level 7, and feeds into the South West Regional Women's Football League. It is affiliated to the Devon County Football Association.

=== Former champions ===
Season	Premier Division	Division One
2015–16	Activate	Buckland Athletic
2014–15	Exeter & Tedburn Rangers	Tavistock Community
2013–14	AFC Plympton	Budleigh Salterton
2012–13	Alphington	Ilfracombe
2011–12	Bay Ladies	Ashmoor Ladies

== 2016–17 ==
The teams competing in the Devon Women's Football League this season are listed below.

=== Premier Division ===
Eight teams are entered into the Premier Division for the 2016–17 season. All of these teams played in the same division last season unless otherwise indicated.

- Bideford Town
- Buckland Athletic Reserves (promoted from Division One)
- Feniton
- Lakeside Athletic
- Plainmoor (promoted from Division One)
- Plymouth Argyle Reserves (new team founded in 2016)
- Tavistock
- University of Exeter

=== Division One ===
Nine teams have been accepted into Division One of the Devon Women's Football League for the 2016–17 season.

- Brixham Villa
- Budleigh Salterton
- Ilfracombe Town
- Keyham Colts
- Newton St Cyres
- Ottery St Mary
- Seaton Town
- Shaldon Villa
- University of Plymouth
