= Gloucestershire County Women's Football League =

Gloucestershire County Women's League
- Founded: 1998
- First season: 1998–99
- Country: England
- Divisions: 4
- Number of clubs: 41
- Level on pyramid: 7
- Promotion to: South West Regional Women's Football League
- Current champions: Whitchurch Ladies 1st (2024-25)
- Website: Official website

The Gloucestershire County Women's Football League is a women's association football competition run by the Gloucestershire County Football Association. It consists of four divisions and sits at level 7 of the women's football pyramid in England.

== Teams ==
Map showing the location of teams in Division One of the Gloucestershire Women's League in 2025–26.

By 2008-09 season, the league consisted of 2 divisions. This expanded to 3 in the 2009-10 season, before Division 3 was disbanded for the 2011-12 season. The 2020-21 season saw Division 3 reintroduced, and the league was expanded to its largest in the 2024-25 season to include Division 4. The teams competing in the league for the 2025–26 season are:

Division One	Division Two	Division Three	Division Four
AEK Boco Ladies Reserves	Cheltenham Civil Service Ladies First	Abbeymead Rovers Ladies First	Ashton Keynes Youth Ladies
Bishops Cleeve Ladies 1st	Cinderford Town Ladies 1st	AEK Boco Ladies Development	Barnwood United Women
Bristol Brunel Women	City of Gloucester Women First	Andoversford Women	Berkeley Town Ladies
Bristol & West Ladies	Downend Flyers Women Reserves	Bishops Cleeve Ladies Development	Downend Flyers Women 'A'
Cheltenham Saracens Women 1st	Ellwood Ladies First	Bradley Stoke Ladies 1st	Fry Club JFC Women
Dursley Town Ladies First	Longwell Green Ladies First	Bristol Ladies Union First	Lydney Town Ladies
Hartpury Women	Mangotsfield United Women Reserve	Cheltenham Spa Women 1st	Mitcheldean SC Ladies First
Iron Acton Women	Newent Town Women First	Kingswood Women First	Southmead Ladies Reserves
Longlevens Ladies 1st	North Bristol Wanderers Women First	Tuffley Rovers Ladies 1st	Thornbury Town Women
Olveston United Women First	Stoke Lane Athletic Women 1st	Winchcombe Town Ladies 1st	Wessex Wanderers Womens
Southmead Ladies 1st			

== Former champions ==
Season	Division One	Division Two	Division Three	Division Four	Notes
2024-25	Whitchurch Ladies 1st	Gloucester City Women Reserves	Ellwood Ladies First	Cheltenham Spa Women 1st	Introduction of Division 4
2023-24	Cirencester Town Ladies First	Longlevens Ladies 1sts	City of Gloucester Women First	-	
2022-23	Bitton Ladies 1st	Cheltenham Civil Service Ladies First	Bristol Ladies Union First	-	
2021–22	Pucklechurch Sports	Bristol Rovers Development	Bradley Stoke	-	
2020–21	Bristol Rovers	Olveston United	Ellwood Ladies First	-	Reintroduction of Division 3
2019–20	Season abandoned due to the COVID-19 pandemic				
2018–19	Bristol Ladies Union	Cheltenham Town Under-18s	-	-	
2017-18	Frampton Rangers	Longwell Green	-	-	
2016–17	St Nicholas Reserves	Frampton Rangers	-	-	
2015–16	AEK Boco	Abbeymead Rovers	-	-	
2014–15	Oldland Abbotonians	AEK Boco Development	-	-	
2013–14	Cheltenham Civil Service	Cheltenham Town Development	-	-	
2012–13	Bitton	Longwell Green	-	-	
2011–12	Forest of Dean	Quedgeley Wanderers	-	-	Disbanding of Division 3
2010–11	Cam Bulldogs	St Nicholas	Gloucester City Reserves	-	
2009–10	Swindon Supermarine	Bitton	St Nicholas	-	Introduction of Division 3
2008–09	Cleeve West	Swindon Supermarine	-	-	

== Cup competitions ==
Teams participating in the Women's County League compete in the Gordon Perrett Memorial Cup, a competition named after a founder member of the league. The winners of the competition are as follows:

Season	Winners	Runners-up
2021-22	Longwell Green	Dursley Town
2020–21	Cup abandoned due to the COVID-19 pandemic	
2019–20	Cup abandoned due to the COVID-19 pandemic	
2018–19	Bristol Ladies Union	Chipping Sodbury Town
2017-18	Bristol & West	Frampton Rangers
2016–17	Royal Wootton Bassett	Almondsbury UWE
2015-16	AEK Boco	Abbeymead Rovers
2014-15	AEK Boco Development	Cheltenham Town Development
2013-14	No competition run	
2012-13	Bitton Ladies	Cheltenham Civil Service
2010-11	St Nicholas	Bitton Ladies
2009-10	Swindon Supermarine	Bitton Ladies
2008-09	Forest of Dean Ladies	Cleeve West Town
2007-08	Oldland Abbotonians	Cam Bulldogs
2006-07	Stoke Lane Athletic	Cam Bulldogs
2005-06	Downend Flyers	Oldland Abbotonians
2004-05	Stoke Lane Athletic	Cirencester Town
2003-04	Stoke Lane Athletic	Gloucester Athletic
2002-03	Cam Bulldogs	Gloucester City
2001-02	South Bristol Wanderers	University of Bristol
2000-01	No competition run	
1999-00	Chalford	Cirencester Town
1998-99	Cheltenham Reserves	Cirencester Town
