= Cornwall Women's Football League =

- Country: England
- Divisions: 3
- Number of clubs: 24
- Level on pyramid: 7, 8 & 9
- Promotion to: South West Regional Women's Football League Division One
- Current champions: Sticker (Premier Division), FXSU (Div 1) & Porthleven (Div 2) (2026-27)
- Website: Official website

The Cornwall Women's Football League, known during the 2026–27 season as the Earthbound Electrical Cornwall Women's Football League for sponsorship reasons, is a football league which sits at level 7 of the league structure of women's football in England. The winner of the division is eligible for promotion to Division One of the South West Regional Women's Football League and there is no relegation from this league - although there is relegation and promotion between the three divisions - as there are no leagues ranked below this one in the pyramid system. It is affiliated to the Cornwall County Football Association.

== Teams ==
The teams competing in the league during the 2026–27 season are:

PREMIER DIVISION

- Bodmin Women
- Camborne School Of Mines Ladies
- Callington Town Ladies
- Kilkhampton Women
- Saltash Borough Ladies
- St Dennis Ladies
- Wadebridge Town Ladies

DIVISION ONE

- Charlestown Ladies
- Falmouth Women
- Ludgvan Ladies
- Padstow United Ladies
- Porthleven Women
- Redruth United Ladies
- St Agnes AFC Ladies Reserves
- Wendron United Ladies

DIVISION TWO

- Biscovey Women
- Dropship FC Women
- Lanner Women
- Launceston Women
- Saltash United Junior Wildcars
- Saltash United Women
- St Buryan Women FC
- Troon AFC Women
- Truro City FC Women

== Former champions ==
Season	Division West/One		Division East/Two		Notes
Season	Champion	Runner-up	Champion	Runner-up	Notes
2022–23	Helston	RNAS Culdrose	St Agnes	Wadebridge	
2021–22	Sticker	Saltash Boro	RNAS Culdrose	Foxhole	
2020–21	Helston	Penryn	Saltash Utd	Callington	
2018–19	Charlestown	Helston	Wadebridge Town	St Agnes Reserves	
2017–18	St Agnes	Mousehole	Not contested		
2016–17	St Agnes	Helston	Not contested		
2015–16	Illogan RBL Ladies Reserves	Bude Town	Not contested		
2014–15	Illogan RBL Ladies Reserves	St Agnes	Not contested		
2013–14	St Agnes	Newquay Celtic	Not contested		
2012–13	Bodmin Town	Newquay Celtic	Not contested		
2011–12	Truro City	Hayle	Not contested		

== League Cup Winners ==
Season	League Cup		Supplementary Cup	
Season	Champion	Runner-up	Champion	Runner-up
2022–23	Helston	Foxhole	Saltash Boro	Mousehole
