= Lancashire FA Women's County League =

- Founded: 1996
- Country: England
- Divisions: 2 (current season)
- Number of clubs: 17 (current season)
- Level on pyramid: 7–8
- Promotion to: North West Women's Regional Football League Division One
- Website: Official website

The Lancashire FA Women's County League is an amateur competitive women's association football competition based in Lancashire, England run by the Lancashire FA. Founded in 1996 as the Lancashire FA Girls League, the league consists of two division at levels 7 and 8 of the women's pyramid. It promotes to the North West Women's Regional Football League Division One, and does not relegate to any league.

== Teams ==
The teams competing during the 2025–26 season are:

=== Premier Division ===
- Accrington Stanley Reserves
- Blackburn Community Sports Club
- Blackburn Eagles
- Blackpool
- Carlisle United
- Colne
- GT7 Academy
- Penwortham Town
- Stanwix Juniors
- Whitehaven
- Wigan Athletic

=== Championship Division ===
- AFC Bolton
- Burnley Belvedere
- Burnley United
- Chipping
- Chorley
- Lancaster City
- Penrith
- Radcliffe
- Workington Town

=== Division One North ===
- Abbeytown
- Carnforth Rangers
- Dalton United
- GT7 Academy Reserves
- Kendal Town
- Penrith Development
- Vickerstown
- Whitehaven A Team

=== Division One Northwest ===
- AFC Bolton Recreational Team
- Blackpool Town
- Cadley
- Euxton Reserves
- Fleetwood Town Wrens Development
- Morecambe Reserves
- Penwortham Town Blues
- Sir Tom Finney Blues
- SRDC
- St. Annes
- Thornton Cleveleys

=== Division One Southeast ===
- Accrington Stanley Development
- AFC Bolton Reserves
- Blackburn Eagles Reserves
- Bolton County
- Clitheroe Wolves
- Mill Hill (Blackburn)
- Old Boltonians
- Sir Tom Finney Whites
- St. Annes
- Whinney Hill
