= Greater London Women's Football League =

- Founded: 17 September 1972
- First season: 1972–73
- Country: England
- Divisions: 5 (current season)
- Number of clubs: 55 (current season)
- Level on pyramid: 7–9
- Promotion to: London and South East Women's Regional Football League
- Domestic cup: Capital Women's Cup
- League cups: Sue Sharples Memorial Trophy; John Greenacre Memorial Trophy
- Current champions: Actonians Reserves (2022–23)
- Website: Official website

The Greater London Women's Football League is an amateur competitive women's association football competition based in Greater London, England. The league is affiliated with the Amateur Football Alliance, Middlesex County Football Association, and London Football Association. Matches are played on Sundays.

The league is at Tier 7 of the women's pyramid. It promotes to the London and South East Women's Regional Football League, and does not relegate to any league.

== History ==
The league was founded in 1972 as the Hounslow and District Ladies Football League (H&DIST League) with two divisions, named Division A and Division B. In the debut edition, Kingston Grasshoppers won Division A and Barnet Copthall won Division B. Players originally paid to participate, with fees of £3 as of 1974. Gallaher Ladies were named the league's first champions on 9 February 1973 after defeating Moselely 4–0 and securing an unbeaten season.

=== Name changes ===
The league renamed itself Greater London Women's Football League in 1983, then to Greater London Women's Regional League in 1990, and back to Greater London Women's Football League in 2003.

=== Expansion ===
The league added a third division in 1975, a fourth division in 1978, a fifth Premier division in 1991 that offered promotion into the WFA National League, and a sixth division in 1996. In 1975, the league named Steve Perryman its president and added a third division. By 1978, Millwall had joined the league Fulham. By 1982, Tottenham, Watford, and West Ham had joined. The first league match held at a men's first division ground was on 19 April 1989 at The Den between Millwall and Romford.

Hackney Women's F.C., a woman-run and openly lesbian club with an anti-racist charter, was founded in 1986 and began competing in the Greater London Women's Regional League in the 1990s. The club reported incidents of homophobic and bigoted behavior experienced by players to the Women's Football Association and The Football Association.

Chelsea and Arsenal joined in 1990, and Queen's Park Rangers Women joined in 1997.

Fulham launched the league's, and nation's, first professional women's club on 20 April 2000. Longtime members Brentford W.F.C. held its first match at Griffin Park on 1 March 2003. In 2006, Fulham Deaf L.F.C. joined the league. In 2008, they won the treble of Division 4, the Sue Sharples Memorial Trophy, and the Russell Cup. Ashford Town W.F.C and New London Lionesses join in 2016.

=== Sue Sharples Memorial Trophy ===
On 19 April 1994, Tottenham Hotspur Reserves player Sue Sharples died during training. The league added a cup competition named the Sue Sharples Memorial Trophy in her honor, and Tottenham Hotspur Reserves won the inaugural competition.

=== John Greenacre Memorial Trophy ===
On 24 November 2018, West Ham United L.F.C. co-founder and club president John Greenacre died of cancer. The league renamed its cup the John Greenacre Memorial Trophy in his honor.

== Teams ==
The teams competing during the 2025-26 season are:

Premier Division; AFC Croydon Athletic; AFC Leyton; Comets; Islington Borough; Leyton Orient; London Academicals; Luton Town Development; South London; Sporting Duet; Tooting Bec
Division 1 North; Camden and Islington United; Clapton Community Reserves; East Finchley; East London; Enfield Town Development; Hackney Reserves; London Galaxy; United Dragons	Division 1 South; Actonians Thirds; Brentford B CB Hounslow & Abbotts; Civil Service; Hammersmith Football Reserves; Holmesdale Keets; Kenningwell United; Regents Park Rangers; South London Reserves; South London Laces-Spartans
Division 2 North; Alexandra Park; East Finchley Second; Edgeware & Kingsbury; Frenford & MSA; Fusion; London Football School; Rose; Tower Hamlets; Wealdstone	Division 2 South & Central; Balham; CB Hounslow & Abbots Reserves; Clapham United; Grenfell Athletic; South London Laces Atlantics; Tooting Bec Reserves; Tower Hamlets Reserves; Wandsworth Borough
