= Liverpool Women's & Youth Football League =

English regional football league

- Country: England
- Divisions: 3 (current season)
- Number of clubs: 26 (current season)
- Level on pyramid: 7
- Promotion to: North West Women's Regional Football League Division One
- Website: LWYFL Website

The Liverpool Women's & Youth Football League, formerly known as the Liverpool County FA Women's League, is an amateur competitive women's association football competition based in Liverpool and run by the Liverpool FA. The league consists of three adult divisions which are in the 7th, 8th and 9th tiers of the English women's football pyramid. The Premier Division promotes to tier six North West Women's Regional Football League Division One; Division One promotes to the Premier Divisions. Division Two does not relegate to any league. Matches are usually played on Sunday afternoons

The league also runs a League Cup competition.

== Teams ==
The teams competing during the 2025–26 season are:

=== Premier Division ===
- Alder FC Women
- Garswood United Women
- FC Northern Women
- Maghull FC Ladies
- Marine FC Women
- Runcorn Saxons FC
- Southport FC Women
- Tranmere Rovers FC Women Development

=== Division One ===
- Burscough FC Women
- FC Community of Liverpool
- Liverpool Feds Development
- Rainford FC Ladies Athletic
- St Michaels DHFC Ladies
- University of Liverpool FC Women
- Warrington Rylands FC
- Wirral Phoenix FC Women Development

=== Division Two ===
- Bootle FC Womens First Team
- Clay Brow Ladies
- Hesketh Colts Women
- MSB Woolton FC Women Reserves
- Parklands Ladies
- Sefton Park Rangers
- St. Helens Rovers FC Women
- Vauxhall Motors FC
- Vulcan Football Club UDA Ladies
- West Kirby United FC Women
