= Blackpool F.C. Girls & Ladies =

Association football club in England

Blackpool Girls and Ladies
- Full name: Blackpool Football Club Girls and Ladies
- Nicknames: The Seasiders; The Tangerines
- Founded: 2008; 18 years ago
- Ground: AFC Blackpool; Bloomfield Road
- Chairperson: Marc Joseph
- Managers: Andy Aspinall
- League: North West Women's Regional Football League Division One North
- Website: https://www.bfcct.co.uk/bfc-girls-and-ladies/
Home colours	Away colours	Third colours

Blackpool Football Club Girls & Ladies are an English women's football club affiliated with Blackpool F.C. Founded in 2008, the club currently play in the North West Women's Regional Football League Division One North, with home games played at AFC Blackpool's the Mechanics Ground.

Blackpool achieved successive promotions from what was then the eighth tier Lancashire County Division Two, seventh tier Lancashire County Division One, and sixth tier North West Regional Northern Division during the 2008–09, 2009–10, and 2010–11 seasons. After seven seasons in the North West Regional Premier Division, the club were relegated to the North West Regional Division One North at the end of the 2017–18 season.

== History ==
=== Formation and league champions (2008–2011) ===
Blackpool Football Club Girls and Ladies were formed in 2008 from a girls setup that was established in 2004. In their inaugural season, the club won the 2008–09 Lancashire County Division Two, and were promoted to the Lancashire County Division One. The club also reached the Lancashire League Cup Final, but were beaten 1–0 by Morecambe.

Blackpool achieved back-to-back promotions after winning the 2009–10 Lancashire County Division One, and were promoted to the North West Regional Northern Division. The club reached the Lancashire League Cup Final for the second season running, losing 3–1 to Rochdale after extra time.

After one season in charge, Michael O'Neill left the club to join Kendal Town as first team fitness coach, and was succeeded by former Preston North End player Mac Barlow. Barlow, who was part of the side that won promotion from the Lancashire County League, brought in Dave Kelly, Marco Vidoretti and former Greenock Morton winger Mick Perrett to form the management team for the 2009–10 season. Chris Stammers was added to the coaching staff for the 2010–11 season.

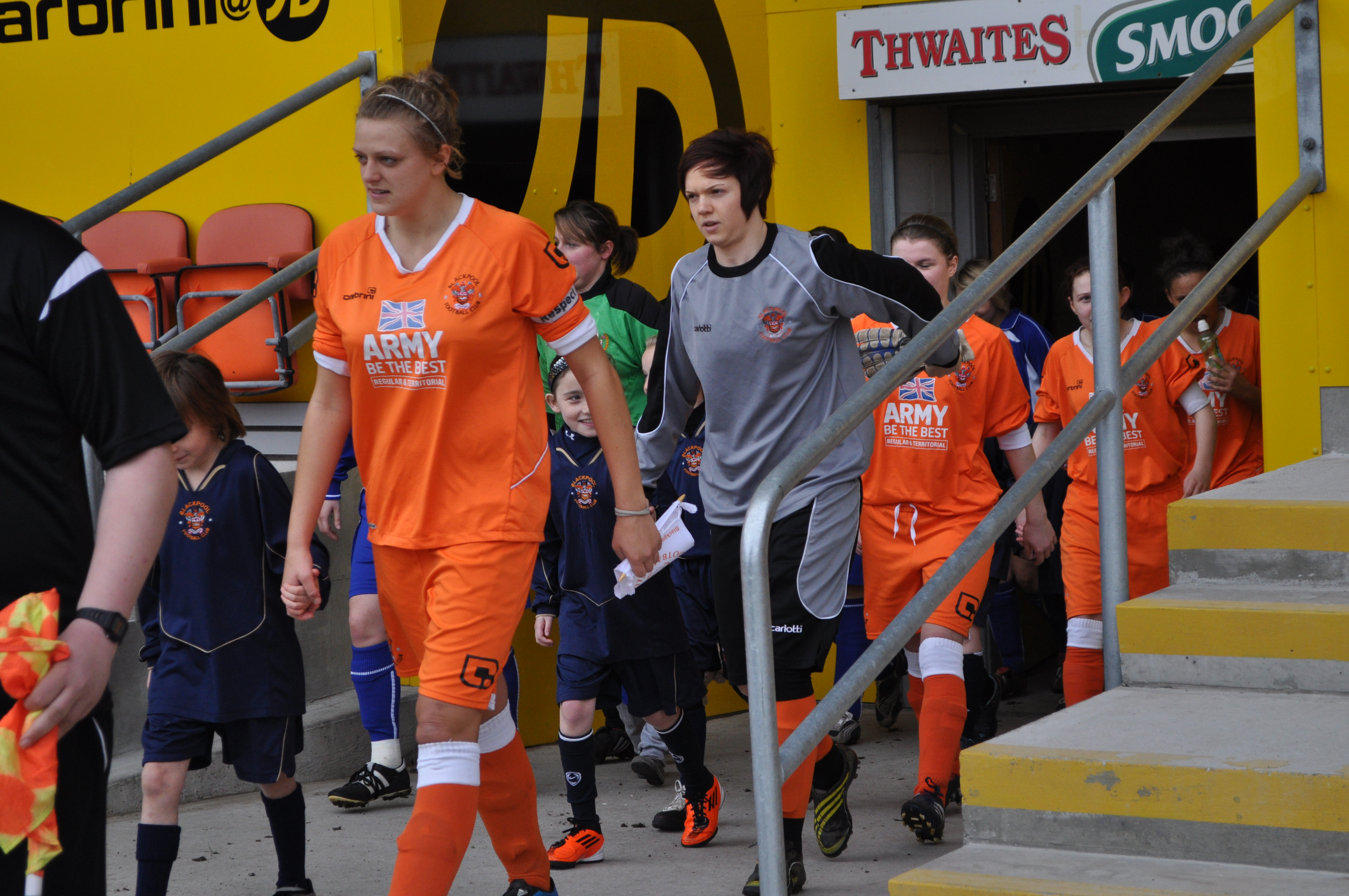
Alice Jackson leads the Ladies out for their Bloomfield Road debut in 2011.

Blackpool achieved a third consecutive promotion after winning the 2010–11 North West Regional Northern Division, with a club record 57 points from a 22-game season. The season also marked the debut of the ladies team at Bloomfield Road, in a 6–0 win against Carlisle United on 3 April 2011.

For the 2011–12 season, David Kelly was announced as first team manager, with Chris Vickers as first team coach. Blackpool won the 2011–12 North West Regional League Cup, beating Blackpool Wren Rovers 4–1 in the final. The club also finished as runners-up in the league.

=== North West Women's Regional Football League (2011 - present) ===
After again finishing as runners-up in the 2012–13 season, Blackpool were relegated to the North West Regional Division One North at the end of the 2017–18 season. The club won the 2022–23 Division One North, achieving promotion back to the Premier Division. The club also won the 2022–23 Lancashire Challenge Cup, beating Bury 4–0 in the final.

Blackpool were relegated the following season, back into the NWWRFL Division One. After a rebuild of the playing squad and the coaching team, the club finished fifth in the league in the 2025/26 season.

== Stadium ==
For much of Blackpool's history, the club played their home games at Hallgate Park, Stalmine. Since 2024, first team home matches are played at AFC Blackpool's the Mechanics Ground. With affiliation with the men's team, the club can also play home fixtures at Bloomfield Road.

== Players ==
=== Current squad ===
As of 6 August 2023.

Note: Flags indicate national team as defined under FIFA eligibility rules; some limited exceptions apply. Players may hold more than one non-FIFA nationality.

No.	Pos.	Nation	Player
—		ENG	Emily Brennan
—		ENG	Nyah Cartwright
—		ENG	Amy Crook
—		ENG	Freya Doyle
—		ENG	Alice Earnshaw
—		ENG	Leah Fielding
—		ENG	Milly Hadfield
—		ENG	Natasha Hart
—		ENG	Bella Holland
—		ENG	Gabby Johnson
—		ENG	Anna Kellaway
—		ENG	Jess Lord
—		ENG	Olivia Loxton
—		ENG	Isla Makepeace
—		ENG	Aleysha Montgomery
—		ENG	Lauren Oatley

No.	Pos.	Nation	Player
—		ENG	Jess Ogden
—		ENG	Caitlin Packer
—		ENG	Grace Quinn
—		ENG	Amelia Roberts
—		ENG	Maisie Rogers
—		ENG	Olivia Sturgeon
—		ENG	Tia Worrall

=== Reserves ===
Blackpool operate a development team who play in the Lancashire County Premier Division. The club also operate several youth teams ranging from U9 to U18, who play in a wide variety of leagues across Lancashire including the Fylde and Lancashire Youth Football League, the North West Super League, and the Greater Manchester Women's Football League.

== Non-playing staff ==
Updated 14 November 2022.

Position	Staff
Chairperson	Marc Joseph
Vice chair	Craig Bailey
First team coach	Lee Church; Robert Plant
Reserves coach	Callum Lord
Goalkeeper coach	Frankie Scott

== Honours ==
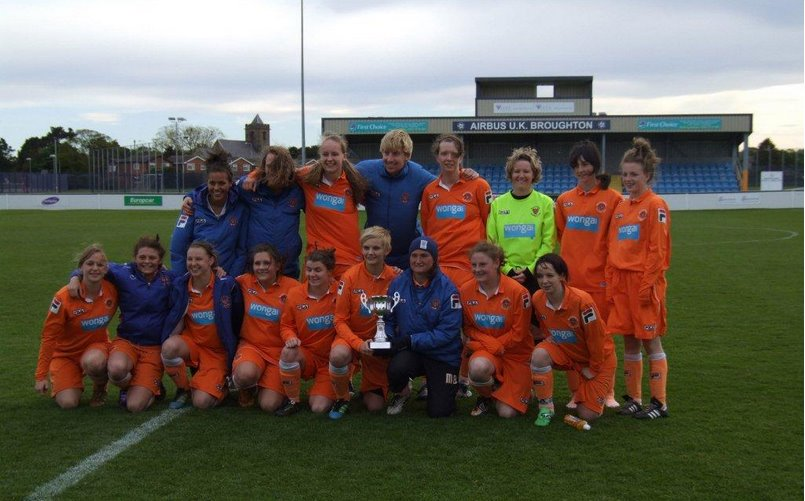
2011–12 North West Regional League Cup Champions

League

- North West Regional Premier Division (level 5)
  - Runners-up: 2011–12, 2012–13
- North West Regional Northern Division (level 6)
  - Champions: 2010–11, 2022–23
- Lancashire County Division One (level 7)
  - Champions: 2009–10
- Lancashire County Division Two (level 8)
  - Champions: 2008–09

Cup

- North West Regional League Cup
  - Winners: 2011–12
- Lancashire Challenge Cup
  - Winners: 2022–23

Blackpool F.C. Youth Team

- West Lancashire Girls Football League Under-18 League Champions: 2010–11
- West Lancashire Girls Football League Under-18 League Cup Winners: 2010–11

Blackpool F.C. Under-16s

- Lancashire FA Under-16 League Runners-up: 2009–10
- Lancashire FA Under-16 Lancashire Cup Winners: 2009–10
- Tesco North West Regional Finals Under 16 Girls Regional Cup Runners Up: 2009–10

Blackpool F.C. Under-15s

- West Lancashire Girls Football League Under-15 League Runners Up: 2010–11
- West Lancashire Girls Football League Under-15 League Cup Runners Up: 2010–11

Blackpool F.C. Under-14s

- West Lancashire Girls Football League Under-14 League Champions: 2009–10
- West Lancashire Girls Football League Under-14 League Cup Winners: 2009–10

Blackpool F.C. Under-13s

- West Lancashire Girls Football League Under-13 League Champions: 2011–12.
- West Lancashire Girls Football League Under-12 League Cup Winners: 2011–12.
- West Lancashire Girls Football League Under-13 League Runners Up: 2010–11
- West Lancashire Girls Football League Under-13 League Cup Winners: 2009–10

Blackpool F.C. Under-12s

- West Lancashire Girls Football League Under-12 League Champions: 2009–10, 2010–11.
- West Lancashire Girls Football League Under-12 League Cup Winners: 2009–10, 2010–11.
- West Lancashire Girls Football League Under-12 Challenge Cup Winners: 2009–10, 2010–11.

Blackpool F.C. Under-11s

- West Lancashire Girls Football League Under-11 League Champions: 2009–10
- West Lancashire Girls Football League Under-11 League Cup Winners: 2009–10
- West Lancashire Girls Football League Under-11 Challenge Cup Winners: 2009–10
