= Greater Manchester Women's Football League =

- Founded: 2011
- Country: England
- Divisions: 3 (current season)
- Number of clubs: 35 (current season)
- Level on pyramid: 7
- Promotion to: North West Women's Regional Football League; Division 1 (North and South)
- Domestic cup: Challenge Cup
- League cup: League Cup
- Current champions: Mancunian Unity (2022–23)
- Website: Official

The Greater Manchester Women's Football League is a women's association football league in Greater Manchester, England run by a league committee. Matches are played on Sunday afternoons.

The league is at levels 7 and 8 of the women's pyramid. The league promotes to the North West Women's Regional Football League and does not relegate to any league.

The league also runs Challenge Cup and League Cup competitions.

== Leagues ==
=== 2023–24 Leagues ===
Premier Division
- Atherton Laburnum Rovers Ladies
- Athletico Middleton Ladies
- Cheadle Town Stingers WFC Development
- Droylsden FC Ladies
- FC United Of Manchester Women's Development
- Hyde United FC Ladies
- Mancunian Unity Reserves
- Old Boltonians Ladies
- Rochdale AFC Womens
- Salford United Juniors Openage Women
- Tiki Taka Women
- West Didsbury & Chorlton AFC Womens Reserves

Division One
- AFC Bolton Ladies
- AFC Oldham 2005 Women's Team
- AFC Urmston Meadowside Women
- Ashton Pumas Women
- Bury FC Women's Reserves
- Crompton FC Open Age
- Eccles United
- Manchester Laces FC Yellow
- Mellor Women
- Penlake FC Ladies
- Swinton Ladies

Division Two
- AFC Oldham Development
- AFC Stockport Lionesses Women
- Ashton Pumas Women
- Bury FC Women's Development
- East Leigh Ladies
- JPS FC Ladies
- Leigh Genesis
- Lymm Rovers Women
- Mersey Valley Ladies
- North Walkden Women's
- Winton Wanderers Women
- Withington Women

=== League champions ===
Season	Division One	Division Two
2011–12	Atherton Ladies FC	Not contested
2012–13	Manchester City FC	Not contested
2013–14	Middleton Athletic FC	Reddish North End
2014–15	FC United of Manchester	Uppermill Ladies FC
2015–16	Chorltonians	Manchester Girls
2016–17	Urmston Meadowside	Heyside Ladies FC
2017–18	Didsbury FC	Barrhill Ladies
2018–19	Salford City Lionesses	West Didsbury and Chorlton Women

== Challenge Cup ==
Challenge Cup winners
Season	Winners	Score	Runners–up	Venue
2013–14	Middleton Athletic	2–0	Chorltonians	Moor Lane
2014–15	FC United of Manchester	3–0	Little Leaver Sports Club	Moor Lane
2015–16	Burnage Metro FC	4–3	Reddish North End	Hurst Cross
2016–17	Urmston Meadowside	1–0	Bolton Lads & Girls Club	Moor Lane
2018–19	Salford City Lionesses	5–1	Langho Ladies	Brookburn Road

== League Cup ==
The GMWFL also runs an Open Age League Cup competition.

League Cup winners
Season	Winners	Score	Runners–up	Venue
2011–12	Atherton Ladies FC	3–2	Curzon Ashton Ladies FC	Moor Lane
2012–13	Manchester City FC	1–0	FC United of Manchester	Moor Lane
2013–14	Middleton Athletic FC	A–A	N/A - match abandoned	Moor Lane
2013–14	FC United of Manchester	A–A	N/A - match abandoned	Moor Lane
2014–15	Chorltonians FC	2–1	Beechfield United Ladies	Tameside Stadium
2016–17	Bolton Lads & Girls Club	4–1	Didsbury FC	Brookburn Road
2017–18	Bolton Lads & Girls Club	0–0 (6–5 pens)	Didsbury FC	Brookburn Road
2018–19	Salford City Lionesses	12–1	Langho Ladies	Brookburn Road
