= Thames Valley Counties Women's Football League =

- Country: England
- Divisions: 9 (current season)
- Number of clubs: 81 (current season)
- Level on pyramid: 7
- Promotion to: Southern Region Women's Football League Division One
- Current champions: Abbey Rangers Ladies (2018–19)

The Thames Valley Counties Women's Football League is a women's association football competition in England covering the counties within the Thames Valley region. The League consists of seven adult divisions and two under 18 divisions.

The League is at tier 7 of the women's pyramid. It promotes to the Southern Region Women's Football League Division One, and does not relegate to any league.

The league was null and voided in the 2019–20 season due to the coronavirus pandemic.

== Teams ==
The teams competing during the 2025/26 season are:

=== Women's - Open Age ===
Division 1 Ashridge Park Women; Barton United `Fc Ladies; Caversham AFC Ladies; East Oxford Ladies; Eversley & California Ladies; Finchampstead Ladies; Ruislip Rangers Ladies; Wallingford and Crowmarsh Fc Ladies; Yateley United Ladies
Division 2 Denham United Ladies Reserves; Harefield United Ladies; Headington Amateurs Ladies; Holyport Ladies; Kingsclere Ladies; Long Crendon Ladies; Oxford City Women U23; Procision Oxford Ladies; Thame FC Women; Tower Hill Ladies
Division 3 (North); Aylesbury United Ladies; Buckingham United Ladies; Chinnor Ladies; Easington Sports Ladies FC; EB Lions AFC Ladies; Haddenham Ladies; Launton Ladies; Milton Keynes City Women	Division 3 (South); Caversham AFC Women; Mortimer Ladies; Newbury Ladies Development; S4K FC Berks County Ladies; Slough Town Rebels; Taplow United Ladies; Thatcham Flames; Wallingford Town AFC Ladies; Wargrave Womens Reserves
Division 3 (East); Abbey Rangers FC Ladies Reserves; Ascot United Ladies Reserves; Bessingby Park Rangers Women; Guildford Saints Ladies; Hawley Ladies; Hillingdon Abbots Ladies FC; Penn & Tylers Green Ladies; Slough Town FC Ladies; Woking Ladies FC Reserves	Division 3 (West); Barton United Ladies; Carterton Ladies Reserves; East Oxford Ladies; Headington Amateurs; Kidlington Ladies; Stonesfield & Chadlington Ladies; Summertown Stars AFC Ladies; Wantage Town FC Ladies; Witney Vikings Ladies
Development Division 3 AFC Henley Ladies; Goring United Ladies; Shinfield Rangers Women; Stanford-in-the-Vale Women; Thatcham Town Ladies; Wraysbury Village Ladies; Wycombe Saints Ladies; Yateley United Ladies

=== Under 18's ===
U18's North
Abingdon United FC U18
Charlbury Town U18 Girls
Chesham United LFC U18
Kidlington Girls U18
Maidenhead Boys & Girls U18
Maidenhead United U17 Ravens
Summertown Stars AFC U18
Wycombe Wanderers FC U18

U18's South
AFT U17 Diamond Girls
Berks County U18 Girls
Caversham AFC U18
Laurel Park U18 Girls Starz
Sandhurst Town U17 Rockets
Tilehurst Panthers U18 Women
Wargrave Girls FC U18
Winnersh Rangers U17 Stingers
Wokingham & Emmbrook U18
