= Derbyshire Girls & Ladies Football League =

- Founded: 2003
- Country: England
- Divisions: 3 (current season)
- Number of clubs: 24 (current season)
- Level on pyramid: 7
- Promotion to: East Midlands Regional Women's Football League Division One
- Current champions: Borrowash Victoria Ladies (2023-24)

The Derbyshire Girls & Ladies League is a women's association football league in England. Covering the county of Derbyshire, the league consists of three adult divisions sitting at levels 7, 8 and 9 of the women's football pyramid system, as well as girls' youth divisions from ages under-7 to under-18. It promotes to the East Midlands Regional Women's Football League Division One. Women's matches are played on Sundays and girls' matches are played on Saturdays.

== Current teams (2024-25 season) ==
=== Division One ===
Team	Location	Ground	2023–24 season
Amber Valley	Ilkeston	Dobholes Lane Recreation Ground	6th
Borrowash Victoria	Borrowash	Anderson Electrical Arena	1st
Buxton Juniors	Buxton	Sterndale Moor	D2 1st
Draycott Victoria	Draycott	Draycott Recreation Ground	4th
Duffield Dynamo	Duffield	Eyes Meadow	D2 2nd
Pride Park	Allenton	Moorways Stadium	2nd
Stapenhill	Burton upon Trent	Maple Grove	new team
Wirksworth Colts	Wirksworth	Wirksworth Leisure Centre	5th

=== Division Two ===
Team	Location	Ground	2023–24 season
Ashbourne	Ashbourne	Osmaston Polo Field	D1 10th
Bakewell Town	Bakewell	Bakewell Recreation Ground	D1 9th
Belper Town Development	Belper	Alton Recreation Ground	6th
Castle Donington	Castle Donington	Moira Dale Sports Ground	3rd
Gresley Rovers	Swadlincote	The Moat Ground	
Hilton Harriers	Hilton	The Mease Pavilion	7th
Matlock Town Ladies	Matlock	Causeway Lane	4th
Stanton Ilkeston	Ilkeston	Ron Brooks Playing Field	D1 8th

=== Division Three ===
Team	Location	Ground	2023–24 season
Allenton United	Allenton	Moorways Stadium	D2 8th
Aston Village	Aston-on-Trent	The Recreation Centre (Aston-on-Trent)	D2 14th
Borrowash Victoria Reserves	Borrowash	Anderson Electrical Arena	D2 11th
Doveridge Development	Doveridge	Etwall Leisure Centre	new team
Gresley Rovers Reserves	Swadlincote	Gresley Old Hall	new team
Hatton United	Hatton	Washlands Sports and Social Club	D2 13th
Pride Park Development	Allenton	Moorways Stadium	new team
Sleetmoor United	Alfreton	Sleetmoor United FC	D2 12th

== Previous winners ==
Season	Division One	Division Two
2007–08	Midway Ladies	–
2008–09	Killamarsh Ladies	–
2009–10	Pinxton Welfare Ladies	–
2010–11	Ilkeston Town Ladies	Hasland Ladies
2011–12	Pinxton Ladies	St George's
2012–13	GFC Alfreton Ladies	Oxcroft Ladies
2013–14	Underwood Villa	Ashbourne Ladies
2014–15	Dronfield Town Ladies	LFC Buxton
2015–16	Glossop North End	Wirksworth Colts
2016–17	Glossop North End	Belper Town
2017–18	Ilkeston FC	Derby County FC
2018–19	Chesterfield	Hasland
2019–20		
2020–21	Draycott Victoria	Mickleover Sports
2021–22	Draycott Victoria	Pride Park
2022–23	Wirksworth Colts	Borrowash Victoria
2023–24	Borrowash Victoria	Pride Park

== League tables (2019-20 season) ==
=== Division 1 ===
Pos	Team	Pld	W	D	L	GF	GA	GD	Pts	Notes
1.	Chesterfield Ladies	8	5	1	2	21	15	+6	16	
2.	Draycott Victoria	6	5	0	1	15	4	+11	15	
3.	Mickleover Sports	8	4	1	3	23	22	+1	13	
4.	Wirksworth Colts Ladies	8	4	0	4	27	16	+11	12	
5.	Pride Park Ladies	2	2	0	0	12	4	+8	6	
6.	Belper Town Ladies	3	1	0	2	7	6	+1	3	
7.	Hasland Ladies	6	1	0	5	11	34	-23	3	
8.	Chesterfield Inspire	7	1	0	6	5	20	-15	-3	

=== Division 2 ===
Pos	Team	Pld	W	D	L	GF	GA	GD	Pts	Notes
1.	SK Vipers	11	11	0	0	56	15	+41	33	
2.	Ilkeston FC Ladies	11	8	1	2	51	19	+32	25	
3.	Sandiacre Town Ladies	9	5	1	3	35	17	+18	16	
4.	Holbrook Ladies	7	5	0	2	25	11	+14	15	
5.	Woodlands Ladies	8	4	0	4	36	32	+4	12	
6.	Hilton Harriers Ladies	8	4	0	4	17	16	+1	12	
7.	Matlock Town Ladies FC	7	3	0	4	14	16	-2	9	
8.	Sleetmoor Ladies	5	2	1	2	11	13	-2	9	
9.	Castle Donington Ladies	11	2	1	8	16	59	-43	7	
10.	Sawley Ladies	10	2	0	8	17	42	-25	6	
11.	Belper Town Reserves	9	0	0	9	5	43	-38	0	
