= Cheshire Women's & Youth Football League =

English amateur football competition

- Founded: 2011
- First season: 2011–12
- Country: England
- Divisions: 2 (current season)
- Number of clubs: 22 (current season)
- Level on pyramid: 7
- Promotion to: North West Women's Regional Football League Division One
- Domestic cup: Altrincham FC
- Current champions: Nantwich Town (2024-25)
- Website: Official website

The Cheshire Women's & Youth Football League is an amateur competitive women's association football competition based in Cheshire, England, run by the Cheshire FA. Founded in the 2011–12 season, the league is a recipient of the FA Charter Standard Award.

The league consists of open age divisions and a youth division. It is at level 7 to 8 of the women's pyramid. It promotes to the North West Women's Regional Football League Division One, and does not relegate to any league.

== 2025–2026 teams ==
Locations of the 2023–24 Cheshire Women's & Youth Football League teams
– Premier – Division One

=== Premier Division ===
- Wirral United
- Chester FC Women Development
- Congleton Town Ladies
- Newton Le Willows
- Winsford Town
- Nantwich Town Ladies Dev
- Middlewich Town
- Stockport County Ladies Development
- Witton Albion
- Northwich Victoria
- Sandbach United
- Wythenshawe FC 2nds

=== Championship (Division One) ===
- Sutton Rangers
- Crewe Ladies
- Egerton FC Women
- Frodsham Town Women
- Glenavon JFC Belles
- Manchester Rovers Women
- Oxton Ladies
- Bollington
- Neston Nomads
- Vauxhall Motors

== Table ==
=== Premier 2023–24 ===
Pos	Team	Pld	W	D	L	GF	GA	GD	Pts	Promotion, qualification or relegation
1	AFC Crewe Women	14	9	2	3	28	15	+13	29	Promotion to Level 6
2	Macclesfield FC Women	11	9	1	1	31	7	+24	28	
3	Chester FC Women Development	12	8	3	1	36	17	+19	27	
4	Nantwich Town Ladies	14	5	4	5	25	25	0	19	
5	Runcorn Sports Women	13	4	2	7	20	24	−4	14	
6	Congleton Town Ladies	13	3	2	8	32	51	−19	11	
7	Stockport County Ladies Development	12	3	1	8	27	39	−12	10	
8	Macclesfield Town Ladies	9	0	1	8	7	28	−21	1	Relegation to Level 8

Updated to match(es) played on 17 March 2024. Source:
Rules for classification: 1) Points; 2) Goal difference; 3) Number of goals scored; 4) Number of matches won; 5) Head-to-head results

=== Division One 2023–24 ===
Pos	Team	Pld	W	D	L	GF	GA	GD	Pts	Promotion, qualification or relegation
1	Wirral United Women	16	12	3	1	53	17	+36	39	Promotion to Premier Division
2	Newton-Le-Willows Ladies	13	12	0	1	62	19	+43	36	
3	Glenavon JFC Belles	14	7	2	5	47	28	+19	23	
4	Wythenshawe FC Women	14	7	1	6	36	33	+3	22	
5	Frodsham Town Women	16	6	3	7	25	29	−4	21	
6	Manchester Rovers Women	15	5	4	6	42	42	0	19	
7	Sandbach United Women	15	6	1	8	32	45	−13	19	
8	Timperley Villa Youth Ladies	13	6	0	7	29	45	−16	18	
9	Egerton FC Women	14	4	2	8	37	31	+6	14	
10	Crewe Ladies	13	3	0	10	33	64	−31	9	
11	Congleton Town Ladies Reserves	15	3	0	12	22	65	−43	9	Relegation to Level 9

Updated to match(es) played on 17 March 2024. Source:
Rules for classification: 1) Points; 2) Goal difference; 3) Number of goals scored; 4) Number of matches won; 5) Head-to-head results

== Champions ==
Season	Division One	Division Two	Division Three	Youth	Challenge Cup Winners	Youth Cup Winners
2011–12	Stockport County Ladies Reserves	Stockport County Youth Yellow	no comp	n/a	Ellesmere Port Town	Stockport County
2012–13	Ellesmere Port Town Ladies	Urmston Meadowside	no comp	n/a	Ellesmere Port Town	n/a
2013–14	Stockport County Deve LFC	Warrington Wolverines	no comp	Stockport County	Crewe Alexandria LFC	Stockport County
2014–15	Warrington Wolverines	Stockport County Youth	no comp	Crewe Alexandria LFC	Stockport County	
2015–16	Runcorn Linnets LFC	Manor Club Youth	no comp	Runcorn Linnets LFC	Stockport County Dev LFC	Stockport County
2016–17	Crewe Alexandra Ladies	Stockport County Deve LFC	no comp	Rylands LFC	no comp	no comp
2017–18	Chester FC	Altrincham FC Ladies Development	Upton FC	Rylands LFC	Chester FC	Rylands LFC
2018–19	West Kirby	Rylands FC Women	no comp	Crewe Alexandra Youth	Stockport County Dev LFC	Chester FC
2019–20	Void	Void	Void	Void	Void	Void
Season	Premier	Division One West	Division One East	Youth	Challenge Cup Winners	
2020-21	Void	Void	Void	Void	Void	
2021-22	Upton Women	Willaston FC Ladies	Macclesfield FC Women	Oxton Ladies U18	Ellesmere Port Town Ladies	
Season	Premier	Division One	Youth	Challenge Cup Winners		
2022-23	Ellesmere Port Town Ladies	Egerton FC Women	Chester FC Women U18	Macclesfield FC Women		

2023–24 Premier Division, Championship Division, Under 18s Premier, Under 18s Championship, Challenge Cup, Under 18s Challenge Cup.

                 Macclesfield FC!! Newton Le Willows  !! Chester FC Under 18s !! Appleton panthers U18s !! Macclesfield FC !! Stockport County U18s
