= Suffolk Girls and Women's Football League =

Suffolk Girls & Women's Football League
- Country: England
- Divisions: 2
- Level on pyramid: 7 and 8
- Promotion to: Eastern Region Women's Football League Division One
- Current champions: Brantham Athletic Ladies (2023–24)
- Website: Official website

The Suffolk Girls & Women's Football League is a women's association football competition run by the Suffolk County Football Association. It sits at level 7 of the women's football pyramid in England.

== Clubs ==
The clubs competing during the 2026–27 season are:

=== Women's Premiership ===
- Alresford Colne Rangers Ladies FC
- AFC Sudbury Women Development
- Brantham Athletic Ladies
- Bury Town Community Women
- Capel Plough Ladies
- Halesworth Town FC Women
- Ipswich Valley Rangers FC Women
- Long Melford FC Women
- Needham Market Women Development
- Stowupland Falcons Women
- Woodbridge Town Ladies

=== Women's Championship ===
- Bury Town Community Women
- Capel Plough Ladies Development
- Claydon Ladies FC
- Coplestonians Women
- Debenham FC Women
- Framlingham Town Ladies
- Ipswich Wanderers Women
- Saxmundham Sports Ladies
- Stowmarket Town Women
- Woodbridge Town FC Ladies Development
