= West Midlands Regional Women's Football League =

- Founded: 1990
- Country: England
- Divisions: 3
- Number of clubs: 32
- Level on pyramid: 5 & 6
- Feeder to: FA Women's National League

The West Midlands Regional Women's Football League is at the fifth and sixth levels of the English women's football pyramid, with the seven other Regional Leagues – Eastern, London & SE, Southern, South West, East Mids, North East and North West. The West Midlands Regional Women's Football League feeds directly into the FA Women's Premier League, and lies above the Birmingham Women's Football League, Staffordshire Women's Football League and Worcestershire Women's Football League in the pyramid. The pyramid structure was founded in 1998.

Below the Premier Division the two Division Ones are split geographically with Division One South and Division One North.

== 2025–26 teams ==
=== Premier Division ===
Club	Home ground
Alvechurch Women	The Hayes Playing Fields, Kings Norton
Burton Albion Women	Pirelli Stadium, Burton-upon-Trent
Coundon Court Ladies	Hawkesmill Sports Club, Allesley
Coventry Sphinx Ladies	Cameron Slater Stadium, Coventry
Hednesford Town Ladies	Keys Park, Hednesford
Leek Town Women	F.Ball Community Stadium, Leek
Lye Town Women	Stourbridge Road, Stourbridge
Port Vale Women	Bradeley Football Centre, Chell Heath
Redditch Borough Women	Redditch Borough Community Sports and Social Club, Batchley
Shifnal Town Ladies	Acoustafoam Stadium, Shifnal
Shrewsbury Town Women	Shrewsbury Town Community Pitches, Shrewsbury
Solihull Moors Women	Studley Sports Centre, Studley

Location of the WMRWFL Premier Division clubs for the 2025–26 season

=== Division One North ===
Club	Home ground
AFC Telford United Ladies	Telford College, Wellington
Chasetown Women	The Scholars Ground, Chasetown
Leek Town Women Reserves	F. Ball Community Stadium, Leek
Lichfield City Ladies	Trade Tyre Community Stadium, Lichfield
Newcastle Town Women	RED Industries Lyme Valley Stadium, Newcastle-under-Lyme
Rugby Town Women	Butlin Road, Rugby
Telford Town Ladies	DRM Aggregate Arena, Oakengates
Walsall Women	Dales Lane, Rushall
Whitchurch Alport Women	Yockings Park, Whitchurch

Location of the WMRWFL Division One North clubs for the 2025–26 season

=== Division One South ===
Club	Home ground
Bromsgrove Sporting Ladies	UK Electrical Ground, Bromsgrove
Crusaders Women	Tythe Barn Farm, Shirley
Droitwich Spa Ladies	Droitwich Spa Leisure Centre, Droitwich
Halesowen Town Ladies	Illey Lane, Halesowen
Hereford Women	Edgar Street, Hereford
Hereford Pegasus Ladies	Old School Lane, Hereford
Kingfisher Women	Trinity High School, Redditch
Knowle Ladies	Robins Nest, Knowle
Leamington Ladies	Your Co-op Community Stadium, Bishop's Tachbrook
Long Itchington Women	Kenilworth Sporting Ground, Kenilworth
Redditch United Women	Valley Stadium, Redditch
Worcester City Women Reserves	Pershore High School, Pershore

Location of the WMRWFL Division One South clubs for the 2025–26 season
