= 2026–27 Preston North End W.F.C. season =

English football club season

Preston North End Women
2026–27 season
- Manager: Mark Steele
- Stadium: Inglewhite Road
Home colours	Away colours	Third colours

The 2026–27 season is Preston North End Women's Football Club first season in the North West Women's Premier League.

== Transfers and contracts ==
=== In ===
Date	Pos.	Player	From	Ref.
7 July 2026	FW	(England) Olivia Rodriguez	(England) Accrington Stanley	
9 July 2026	DF	(England) Ella Whittaker	(England) Blackburn Rovers	
16 July 2026	MF	(England) Ella Finch	Free agent	
24 July 2026	MF	(England) Charlotte Tyres	Free agent	
26 July 2026	MF	(England) Nicola Alston	Free agent	
11 September 2026	FW	(England) Sophia Attfield	Free agent	
24 October 2026	DF	(England) Ellie Duffy	Free agent	

=== Out ===
Date	Pos.	Player	To	Ref.
5 August 2026	DF/MF	(England) Mollie Briscoe	Scholarship	

=== Loaned in ===
Date	Pos.	Player	From	Date until	Ref.
13 July 2026	MF	(England) Ella Green	(England) AFC Fylde	End of Season	

== Competitions ==
=== Overall record ===
Competition	First match	Last match	Starting round	Final position	Record							
Competition	First match	Last match	Starting round	Final position	Pld	W	D	L	GF	GA	GD	Win %
North West Women's Premier League	16 August 2026	11 April 2027	Matchday 1	TBD	10	4	1	5	12	16	−4	40.00
FA Cup	20 September 2026	01 November 2026	Second round qualifying	First round	3	2	0	1	12	3	+9	66.67
League Cup	29 November 2026	TBD	First Round	TBD	0	0	0	0	0	0	+0	—
Total					13	6	1	6	24	19	+5	46.15

=== North West Women's Premier League ===
The North West Women's Premier League fixtures were released on 16 July 2026.

==== Matches ====
Win Draw Loss Fixtures

16 August 2026 1	Preston North End Women	1–0	Crewe Alexandra Women	Longridge
14:00 BST	Alicia Scott 37'	Report		Stadium: Inglewhite Road; Attendance: 100; Referee: Lewis Hillman

19 August 2026 2	Darwen Women	2–0	Preston North End Women	Euxton
18:30 BST	Abi Duffell 51'; Maddison McKenna 70'	Report		Stadium: Chancery Road Playing Field, Badger's Walk; Attendance: 0 Referee: Daniel Halton

23 August 2026 3	F.C. St Helens Women	0–0	Preston North End Women	St Helens
14:00 BST		Report		Stadium: Windleshaw Sports; Attendance: 104; Referee: Luke Ryding

26 August 2026 4	Preston North End Women	0–4	Bolton Wanderers Women	Bamber Bridge
19:30 BST		Report	Naomi Lawrence 7'; 9' (o.g.); Lauren Sharples 29'; Lucy Walsh 78'	Stadium: Bamber Bridge Leisure Centre; Referee: Stuart Schofield

30 August 2026 5	Preston North End Women	4–2	Tranmere Rovers Women	Longridge
14:00 BST	Grace Flinn 20'; Olivia Rodriguez 67'; Laura Walker 69'; Alicia Scott 90'	Report	Neve Adams 32'; Eleanor Doyle 55'	Stadium: Inglewhite Road; Attendance: 48; Referee: Andrew Byrne

6 September 2026 6	Bury Women	3–0	Preston North End Women	Bury
14:00 BST	Murron Alldread 61'; Ruby Hulme 64'; Kaya Anderson 83'	Report		Stadium: Gigg Lane; Referee: Stuart Schofield

13 September 2026 7	Manunian Unity Women	3–2	Preston North End Women	Chadderton
14:00 BST	Millie Jardine 49'; Ella Barnes 79'; Charlie Ferguson 90+7'	Report	Alicia Scott 15'; Grace Flinn 40'	Stadium: Andrew Street; Referee: David Chisnall

27 September 2026 8	Preston North End Women	0–1	Nantwich Town F.C. Women	Longridge
14:00 BST		Report	Megan Andrews 73'	Stadium: Inglewhite Road; Attendance: 80; Referee: Liam Paul

11 October 2026 9	Poulton Vics FC Ladies	1–2	Preston North End Women	Bidston
14:00 BST		Report	Emma Tunstall 65'; Madison Hadley 69'	Stadium: Bidston Sports & Activity Centre; Attendance: 30; Referee: Raymund McLaughlin

18 October 2026 10	West Didsbury & Chorlton AFC Womens	0–3	Preston North End Women	Chorlton-cum-Hardy
14:00 BST	Elle Caddick (red card) 75'	Report	Madison Hadley 33'; Ella Finch 60'; Laura Walker 77'	Stadium: Step Places Stadium; Attendance: 108; Referee: Ian Scott

22 November 2026 11	FC United Of Manchester Women	v	Preston North End Women	Moston, Manchester
14:00 GMT				Stadium: Broadhurst Park

6 December 2026 12	Crewe Alexandra Women	v	Preston North End Women	Crewe
14:00 GMT				Stadium: Crewe Alexandra in the Community

13 December 2026 13	Preston North End Women	v	F.C. St. Helens Women	Longridge
14:00 GMT				Stadium: Inglewhite Road

14 February 2026 14	Tranmere Rovers Women	v	Preston North End Women	Ellesmere Port
14:00 GMT				Stadium: Ellesmere Port Sports Village

21 February 2026 15	Preston North End Women	v	Bury FC Women	Longridge
14:00 GMT				Stadium: Inglewhite Road

28 February 2026 16	Preston North End Women	v	Nantwich Town FC Women
14:00 GMT

7 March 2026 17	Preston North End Women	v	Mancunian Unity Women	Longridge
14:00 GMT				Stadium: Inglewhite Road

14 March 2026 18	Preston North End Women	v	Poulton Vics FC Ladies	Longridge
14:00 GMT				Stadium: Inglewhite Road

21 March 2026 19	Preston North End Women	v	Darwen FC Women	Longridge
14:00 GMT				Stadium: Inglewhite Road

28 March 2026 20	Preston North End Women	v	West Didsbury & Chorlton AFC Women	Longridge
14:00 BST				Stadium: Inglewhite Road

4 April 2026 21	Bolton Wanderers FC Women	v	Preston North End Women	Westhoughton
14:00 BST				Stadium: The Ginge Power Stadium

11 April 2026 22	Preston North End Women	v	FC United Of Manchester Women	Longridge
14:00 BST				Stadium: Inglewhite Road

=== FA Cup ===
==== Matches ====
20 September 2026 Second round qualifying	Preston North End Women	5-1	Wirral United FC Women	Preston
14:00 BST	Madison Hadley 16'; Alicia Scott 34', 54'; Kerry Mahon 52'; Grace Flinn (yellow card) 68', (goal) 74'	Report	Rebecca Tebb 30'	Stadium: Deepdale; Attendance: 501

4 October 2026 Third round qualifying	Preston North End Women	7-0	North Ferriby Women	Longridge
14:00 BST	Alicia Scott 15'; Zea Anderson 20', 40', 63', 80'; Ella Finch 27'; Lisa Topping 72'	Report		Stadium: Inglewhite Road

1 November 2026 Third round qualifying	Preston North End Women	0-2	i2i International Soccer Academy	Longridge
14:00 GMT		Report		Stadium: Inglewhite Road; Attendance: 150

=== League Cup ===
==== Matches ====
29 November 2026 First Round	Darwen Women	v	Preston North End Women	Darwen
14:00 GMT				Stadium: Multevo Group Anchor Ground

== Technical staff ==
Below is a list of non-playing personnel:

Name	Role	Note
Mark Steele	First Team manager
Cameron Molloy	First Team coach
Logan De Klerk	First Team coach

== Players ==
As of 11 November 2026

=== Current squad ===
Note: Flags indicate national team as defined under FIFA eligibility rules; some limited exceptions apply. Players may hold more than one non-FIFA nationality.

No.	Pos.	Nation	Player
1	GK	ENG	Emily Gibbins
2	DF	ENG	Menna Shirras
3	DF	ENG	Emma Tunstall
5	DF	ENG	Kerry Mahon
6	MF	ENG	Ella Finch
7	MF	ENG	Charlotte Tyers
8	MF	ENG	Nicola Alston
9	FW	ENG	Maddie Hadley
10	MF	ENG	Katie Woodhead
11	FW	ENG	Grace Flinn

No.	Pos.	Nation	Player
12	DF	ENG	Caitlin McNicholl
14	DF	ENG	Abbie Jones
15	DF	ENG	Lisa Topping
16	MF	ENG	Samantha Ball
18	FW	ENG	Alicia Scott
19	MF	ENG	Lucy Stevens
20	FW	ENG	Zea Anderson
21	GK	ENG	Maddie Schultz
22	MF	ENG	Ella Green (on loan from AFC Fylde)
27	MF	ENG	Laura Walker (captain)

== Statistics ==
As of match played 1 November 2026

Players with no appearances are not included on the list; italics indicate a loaned in player

No.	Pos	Nat	Player	Total		North West Premier League		FA Cup		League Cup	
No.	Pos	Nat	Player	Apps	Goals	Apps	Goals	Apps	Goals	Apps	Goals
20	FW	(England) ENG	Zea Anderson	6	4	3	0	3	4	0	0
	FW	(England) ENG	Sophie Attfield	1	0	1	0	0	0	0	0
16	MF	(England) ENG	Samantha Ball	5	0	2	0	3	0	0	0
	DF	(England) ENG	Ellie-May Duffy	2	0	1	0	1	0	0	0
6	MF	(England) ENG	Ella Finch	11	2	8	1	3	1	0	0
11	FW	(England) ENG	Grace Flinn	12	3	10	2	2	1	0	0
1	GK	(England) ENG	Emily Gibbins	8	0	7	0	1	0	0	0
22	MF	(England) ENG	Ella Green	5	0	3	0	2	0	0	0
9	FW	(England) ENG	Madison Hadley	5	3	3	2	2	1	0	0
14	DF	(England) ENG	Abbie Jones	7	0	4	0	3	0	0	0
		(England) ENG	Grace Kendall	1	0	1	0	0	0	0	0
5	DF	(England) ENG	Kerry Mahon	12	1	9	0	3	1	0	0
12	DF	(England) ENG	Caitlin McNicholl	4	0	2	0	2	0	0	0
	FW	(England) ENG	Olivia Rodriguez	7	1	6	1	1	0	0	0
21	GK	(England) ENG	Madison Schultz	5	0	3	0	2	0	0	0
18	FW	(England) ENG	Alicia Scott	12	6	9	3	3	3	0	0
2	DF	(England) ENG	Menna Shirras	11	0	8	0	3	0	0	0
19	MF	(England) ENG	Lucy Stevens	6	0	6	0	0	0	0	0
15	DF	(England) ENG	Lisa Topping	13	1	10	0	3	1	0	0
3	DF	(England) ENG	Emma Tunstall	12	1	9	1	3	0	0	0
7	MF	(England) ENG	Charlotte Tyers	9	0	7	0	2	0	0	0
27	MF	(England) ENG	Laura Walker	13	2	10	2	3	0	0	0
10	MF	(England) ENG	Katie Woodhead	13	0	10	0	3	0	0	0
8	MF	(England) ENG	Nicola Worthington	3	0	3	0	0	0	0	0
