= 2025–26 North West Women's Regional Football League =

The 2025-26 North West Women's Regional Football League (NWWRFL) is the 22nd since the league was reconstituted.

The league has two levels: the tier five Premier Division and, split geographically, the tier six Division One North and Division One South.

== Premier Division ==
=== North West Womens Regional Premier ===
FA Women's National League Northern Premier Division
- Season: 2025–26
- Champions: AFC Fylde Women
- Promoted: AFC Fylde Women
- Relegated: Poulton Vics FC Ladies; Fleetwood Town Wrens Ladies 1st Curzon Ashton
- Matches: 110
- Goals: 438 (3.98 per match)
- All statistics correct as of 19 November 2026.

Club	Home ground
AFC Fylde Women	Mill Farm
Bolton Wanderers Women First	Chorley Football Club
Bury	Gigg Lane
Crewe Alexandra	Crewe Alexandra in the Community
Curzon Ashton	Tameside Stadium
Darwen	Multevo Group Anchor Ground
FC United Of Manchester Women	Broadhurst Park
Fleetwood Town Wrens Ladies 1st	Poolfoot Farm
Mancunian Unity Women First	Chadderton FC
Poulton Vics FC Ladies	Poulton Victoria Football Ground
Tranmere Rovers Women	Ellesmere Port Sports Village 3G
West Didsbury & Chorlton	Step Places Stadium

Location of Northern Premier Division clubs for the 2025–26 season

==== League table ====
Pos	Team	Pld	W	D	L	GF	GA	GD	Pts	Qualification
1	AFC Fylde Women (C, P)	20	19	1	0	79	7	+72	58	Promotion to FA Women's National League Division One North
2	Mancunian Unity Women First	20	13	5	2	71	25	+46	44	
3	Bolton Wanderers Women First	20	10	4	6	52	31	+21	34	
4	Darwen	20	9	4	7	37	39	−2	31	
5	Bury	20	9	3	8	36	42	−6	30	
6	Crewe Alexandra	20	8	4	8	32	23	+9	28	
7	West Didsbury & Chorlton	20	8	3	9	36	46	−10	27	
8	FC United Of Manchester Women	20	7	2	11	34	39	−5	23	
9	Tranmere Rovers Women	20	4	7	9	35	46	−11	16 (Note: Tranmere Rovers Women were deducted three points)	
10	Poulton Vics FC Ladies (R)	20	3	5	12	17	47	−30	14	Relegation to NWRFL Division One
11	Fleetwood Town Wrens Ladies 1st (R)	20	1	0	19	9	93	−84	0 (Note: Fleetwood Wrens Ladies First Team were deducted three points and fined £50 for to failing to fulfill a fixture.)	Relegation to NWRFL Division One
12	Curzon Ashton (R)	0	0	0	0	0	0	0	0	Relegation to NWRFL Division One

Rules for classification: 1) Points; 2) Goal difference; 3) Number of goals scored
(C) Champions; (P) Promoted; (R) Relegated

==== Results ====
Home \ Away	AFY	BOL	BUR	CRE	DAR	FUM	FTW	MUW	POV	TRA	WDC
AFC Fylde Women	—	4–0	5–1	1–0	3–0	4–0	HW	4–0	4–0	4–0	7–0
Bolton Wanderers Women First	0–1	—	1–3	1–1	1–3	2–4	5–0	1–1	6–2	5–0	1–0
Bury	1–5	0–2	—	0–2	3–2	1–0	6–0	1–5	1–1	1–2	2–0
Crewe Alexandra	1–2	1–2	1–2	—	0–1	4–3	3–0	1–1	3–0	2–0	2–0
Darwen	2–9	2–1	0–0	1–0	—	2–1	6–0	0–7	5–0	1–1	2–1
FC United Of Manchester Women	0–3	1–1	7–1	1–2	2–1	—	5–0	1–4	1–0	1–0	0–2
Fleetwood Town Wrens Ladies 1st	1–6	1–9	1–6	0–4	1–5	2–1	—	0–1	0–2	0–5	1–2
Mancunian Unity Women First	1–1	1–2	5–0	3–2	4–0	6–2	12–1	—	3–1	3–3	5–2
Poulton Vics FC Ladies	0–6	0–4	1–1	1–1	0–0	1–0	4–0	0–4	—	1–1	0–1
Tranmere Rovers Women	0–6	3–3	1–2	1–1	2–2	2–3	5–0	2–4	2–1	—	3–3
West Didsbury & Chorlton	0–4	3–5	1–4	3–1	3–2	1–1	6–1	1–1	4–2	3–2	—

Updated to match(es) played on 11 November 2026. Source:
Legend: Blue = home team win; Yellow = draw; Red = away team win.
