= 2025–26 Preston North End W.F.C. season =

English football club season

Preston North End Women
2025–26 season
- Manager: Mark Steele
- Stadium: Inglewhite Road
- North West Division One North: 1st
- FA Cup: Qualification - 2nd Round
- North West Regional Cup: Preliminary
- North West Regional Plate: 1st Round
- Top goalscorer: League: Madison Hadley (13); All: Madison Hadley (18)
- Biggest win: 8-2 vs Bolton Wanderers Women Reserves
- Biggest defeat: 1-6 vs Bolton Wanderers Women First Team
Home colours	Away colours	Third colours

The 2025–26 season saw Preston North End Women's Football Club win the North West Women's Division One North title, earning promotion to North West Women's Premier League. The Lillywhites won the title with a game to spare, as title rivals Bolton Wanderers had been beaten 3-0 by Penrith.

== Competitions ==
=== Overall record ===
Competition	First match	Last match	Starting round	Final position	Record							
Competition	First match	Last match	Starting round	Final position	Pld	W	D	L	GF	GA	GD	Win %
North West Division One North	17 August 2025	12 April 2026	Matchday 1	1st	16	13	0	3	58	16	+42	81.25
FA Cup	07 September 2025	21 September 2025	First Round Qualification	Second Round Qualification	2	1	0	1	7	2	+5	50.00
North West Regional Cup	28 September 2025	28 September 2025	Preliminary Round	Preliminary	1	0	0	1	1	6	−5	0.00
North West Regional Plate	11 January 2026	08 February 2026	Preliminary Round	First Round	2	1	0	1	3	2	+1	50.00
Total					21	15	0	6	69	26	+43	71.43

=== North West Women's Division One North ===
==== Matches ====
Win Draw Loss Fixtures

17 August 2025 1	Preston North End Women	5 - 0	Chorley Women FC Development	Longridge
14:00 (BST)		Report		Stadium: Inglewhite Road; Referee: Andrew Byrne

20 August 2025 2	Morecambe FC Women	0 - 5	Preston North End Women	Morecambe
19:30 (BST)		Report		Stadium: Trimpell Sports and Social Club; Referee: Alan Holmes

24 August 2025 3	Penrith AFC Ladies	2 - 1	Preston North End Women	Penrith
14:00 (BST)		Report		Stadium: Frenchfield Park; Referee: Mark Stewart

27 August 2025 4	Preston North End Women	3 - 0	Blackpool F.C. Girls and Ladies	Longridge
19:30 (BST)		Report		Stadium: Inglewhite Road; Referee: David Hesketh

14 September 2025 5	Preston North End Women	3 - 0	Workington Town Women FC First	Longridge
14:00 (BST)		Report		Stadium: Inglewhite Road; Attendance: 30; Referee: Peter Burns

23 November 2025 6	Haslingden Ladies & Girls Ladies	1 - 4	Preston North End Women	Accrington
14:00 (GMT)		Report		Stadium: Stanley Sports Hub; Attendance: 0 Referee: Dale Markham

30 November 2025 7	Chorley Women FC Development	0 - 5	Preston North End Women	Bamber Bridge
14:00 (GMT)		Report		Stadium: Bamber Bridge Leisure Centre; Attendance: 30; Referee: Liam Paul

14 December 2025 8	Blackpool F.C. Girls and Ladies	1 - 5	Preston North End Women	Blackpool
14:00 (GMT)		Report		Stadium: The Mechanics, Jepson Way; Referee: Geoffrey Ellison

18 January 2026 9	Workington Town Women FC First	0 - 1	Preston North End Women	Worthington
14:00 (GMT)		Report		Stadium: Fibrus Community Stadium; Attendance: 40; Referee: Rowan Johnstone

22 February 2026 10	Accrington Stanley Women FC First	5 - 1	Preston North End Women	Accrington
14:00		Report		Stadium: Accrington and Rossendale College 3G; Attendance: 50; Referee: David Hesketh

01 March 2026 11	Preston North End Women	8 - 2	Bolton Wanderers Women Reserves	Longridge
14:00		Report		Stadium: Inglewhite Road; Referee: Andrew Byrne

08 March 2026 12	Preston North End Women	6 - 2	Haslingden Ladies & Girls Ladies	Longridge
14:00		Report		Stadium: Inglewhite Road; Referee: Benjamin Mason

22 March 2026 13	Preston North End Women	2 - 1	Penrith AFC Ladies	Longridge
14:00		Report		Stadium: Inglewhite Road; Referee: Peter Burns

29 March 2026 14	Bolton Wanderers Women Reserves	1 - 0	Preston North End Women	Bolton
14:00		Report		Stadium: Bolton Wanderers Football Academy; Referee: Jordan Lock

05 April 2026 15	Preston North End Women	3 - 1	Accrington Stanley Women FC First	Longridge
14:00		Report		Stadium: Inglewhite Road; Referee: Benjamin Mason

12 April 2026 16	Preston North End Women	6 - 0	Morecambe FC Women	Longridge
14:00		Report		Stadium: Inglewhite Road; Referee: Mark Hughes

=== FA Cup ===
==== Matches ====
07 September 2025 Qualification - 1st Round	Preston North End Women	5 - 0	Haslingden Ladies & Girls Ladies	Longridge
14:00		Report		Stadium: Inglewhite Road

21 September 2025 Qualification - 2nd Round	Poulton Vics FC Ladies	2 - 2 (4–1 p)	Preston North End Women	Poulton
14:00		Report		Stadium: Poulton Victoria Football Ground; Attendance: 150

=== North West Women's Regional Cup ===
==== Matches ====
28 September 2025 Preliminary	Preston North End Women	1 - 6	Bolton Wanderers FC First - Womens	Longridge
14:00		Report		Stadium: Inglewhite Road; Referee: Ella Sands

=== North West Women's Regional Plate ===
==== Matches ====
11 January 2026 Preliminary	Liverpool Feds Reserves Women	0 - 2	Preston North End Women	Liverpool
14:00		Report		Stadium: Jericho Lane Football Hub; Referee: Kevin McGeorge

08 February 2026 1st Round	Preston North End Women	1 - 2	FC St. Helens Women	Bamber Bridge
14:00		Report		Stadium: Bamber Bridge Leisure Centre; Referee: David Hesketh

== Technical staff ==
Below is a list of non-playing personnel:

Name	Role
Mark Steele	First Team manager
Cameron Molloy	First Team coach
Logan De Klerk	First Team coach

== Players ==
=== Squad ===
Note: Flags indicate national team as defined under FIFA eligibility rules; some limited exceptions apply. Players may hold more than one non-FIFA nationality.

No.	Pos.	Nation	Player
—	FW	ENG	Zea Anderson
—			Jazmin Attwood
—	MF	ENG	Samantha Ball
—			Mollie Briscoe
—	FW	ENG	Grace Flinn
—			Emma Foster
—	GK	ENG	Emily Gibbins
—	FW	ENG	Madison Hadley
—			Katie Higham
—	DF	ENG	Abbie Jones
—			Isabelle Kells
—	DF	ENG	Kerry Mahon
—	DF	ENG	Caitlin McNicholl
—			Anabelle Medley

No.	Pos.	Nation	Player
—			Jess Mitchinson
—			Noelia Robles
—	GK	ENG	Madison Schultz
—	FW	ENG	Alicia Scott
—	DF	ENG	Menna Shirras
—	MF	ENG	Lucy Stevens
—	MF		Darcie Tennant
—	DF	ENG	Lisa Topping
—	DF	ENG	Emma Tunstall
—	GK		Mischa Turner
—	MF	ENG	Laura Walker (captain)
—	MF	ENG	Katie Woodhead

== Statistics ==
Players with no appearances are not included on the list; italics indicate a loaned in player

No.	Pos	Nat	Player	Total		North West Division One North		Cup Games	
No.	Pos	Nat	Player	Apps	Goals	Apps	Goals	Apps	Goals
			Zea Anderson	3	1	3	1	0	0
			Jazmin Attwood	5	0	4	0	1	0
			Samantha Ball	15	1	14	1	1	0
			Hannah Brindle	2	0	2	0	0	0
			Mollie Briscoe	5	0	5	0	0	0
			Grace Flinn	16	11	14	11	2	0
			Emma Foster	2	0	2	0	0	0
			Emily Gibbins	5	0	3	0	2	0
			Madison Hadley	17	14	14	13	3	1
			Abbie Jones	17	4	15	4	2	0
			Isabelle Kells	1	0	1	0	0	0
			Kerry Mahon	15	1	12	1	3	0
			Caitlin McNicholl	14	1	11	1	3	0
			Anabelle Medley	4	0	3	0	1	0
			Jess Mitchinson	2	0	2	0	0	0
			Jennifer Pike	7	1	6	1	1	0
			Noelia Robles	3	1	2	1	1	0
			Madison Schultz	9	0	9	0	0	0
			Alicia Scott	19	14	16	12	3	2
			Menna Shirras	17	0	14	0	3	0
			Lucy Stevens	19	1	16	1	3	0
			Darcie Tennant	11	1	9	1	2	0
			Lisa Topping	3	0	2	0	1	0
			Emma Tunstall	19	1	16	1	3	0
			Mischa Turner	4	0	3	0	1	0
			Laura Walker	16	2	13	2	3	0
			Katie Woodhead	18	7	15	6	3	1
