= 2023–24 Preston North End W.F.C. season =

English football club season

Preston North End Women
2023–24 season
- Managers: Nigel Greenwood & David Rawcliffe
- Stadium: UCLAN Sports Arena #1
- North West Division One North: 4th
- FA Cup: Qualification - 2nd Round
Home colours	Away colours	Third colours

The 2023–24 season saw Preston North End Women's Football Club competing in the North West Women's Division One North, finishing in fourth place.

== Competitions ==
=== Overall record ===
Competition	First match	Last match	Starting round	Final position	Record							
Competition	First match	Last match	Starting round	Final position	Pld	W	D	L	GF	GA	GD	Win %
North West Division One North	20 August 2023	28 April 2024	Matchday 1	1st	22	13	1	8	64	38	+26	59.09
FA Cup	10 September 2023	01 October 2023	First Round Qualification	Second Round Qualification	2	1	0	1	3	3	+0	50.00
Total					24	14	1	9	67	41	+26	58.33

Source: Competitions

=== North West Women's Division One North ===
==== Matches ====
Win Draw Loss Fixtures

20 August 2023 1	Preston North End Women FC	5 - 0	Carlisle United Ladies First	Cottam
15:00		Report		Stadium: UCLAN Sports Arena #1

23 August 2023 2	Preston North End Women FC	4 - 0	Bolton Wanderers Girls FC	Cottam
18:30		Report		Stadium: UCLAN Sports Arena #1

30 August 2023 3	Preston North End Women FC	5 - 2	Fleetwood Town Wrens Ladies Reserves	Cottam
18:30		Report		Stadium: UCLAN Sports Arena #1

03 September 2023 4	Morecambe FC Women	1 - 7	Preston North End Women FC	Morecambe
14:00		Report		Stadium: Mazuma Stadium; Attendance: 300

17 September 2023 5	Accrington Stanley Women FC First	3 - 1	Preston North End Women FC	Accrington
14:00		Report		Stadium: Wham Stadium; Attendance: 765

24 September 2023 6	Preston North End Women FC	5 - 1	Radcliffe FC Women	Cottam
14:00		Report		Stadium: UCLAN Sports Arena #1

15 October 2023 7	Workington Reds Ladies First	2 - 1	Preston North End Women FC	Workington
14:00		Report		Stadium: Fibrus Community Stadium; Attendance: 150

22 October 2023 8	Radcliffe FC Women	6 - 1	Preston North End Women FC	Bury
14:00		Report		Stadium: Goshen Sports Centre; Attendance: 120

29 October 2023 9	Preston North End Women FC	5 - 1	Morecambe FC Women	Cottam
14:00		Report		Stadium: UCLAN Sports Arena #1

05 November 2023 10	Penrith AFC Ladies	1 - 2	Preston North End Women FC	Penrith
14:00		Report		Stadium: Frenchfield Park

12 November 2023 11	Preston North End Women FC	3 - 2	Penwortham Town Ladies	Cottam
14:00		Report		Stadium: UCLAN Sports Arena #1

26 November 2023 12	Preston North End Women FC	0 - 1	Penrith AFC Ladies	Cottam
14:00		Report		Stadium: UCLAN Sports Arena #1

17 December 2023 13	Mancunian Unity Women	3 - 2	Preston North End Women FC	Oldham
13:45		Report		Stadium: The Vestacare Stadium

14 January 2024 14	Preston North End Women FC	0 - 0	Accrington Stanley Women FC First	Bamber Bridge
14:00		Report		Stadium: Bamber Bridge Leisure Centre

21 January 2024 15	Bolton Wanderers Girls FC	0 - 2	Preston North End Women FC	Bolton
14:00		Report		Stadium: Bolton Wanderers Football Academy; Attendance: 80

28 January 2024 16	Haslingden Girls & Ladies FC	3 - 2	Preston North End Women FC	Bacup
14:00		Report		Stadium: Valley Leadership Academy; Attendance: 55

04 February 2024 17	Preston North End Women FC	0 - 2	Mancunian Unity Women	Cottam
14:00		Report		Stadium: UCLAN Sports Arena #1; Attendance: 0

14 March 2024 18	Fleetwood Town Wrens Ladies Reserves	2 - 6	Preston North End Women FC	Blackpool
21:00		Report		Stadium: Blackpool Wren Rovers FC

31 March 2024 19	Carlisle United Ladies First	1 - 2	Preston North End Women FC	Carlisle
14:00		Report		Stadium: Creighton Rugby Club

21 April 2024 20	Preston North End Women FC	4 - 3	Haslingden Girls & Ladies FC	Bamber Bridge
14:00		Report		Stadium: Bamber Bridge Leisure Centre

24 April 2024 21	Penwortham Town Ladies	0 - 5	Preston North End Women FC	Penwortham
18:30		Report		Stadium: Vernons Sports Club

28 April 2024 22	Preston North End Women FC	2 - 4	Workington Reds Ladies First	Cottam
14:00		Report		Stadium: UCLAN Sports Arena #1

=== FA Cup ===
==== Matches ====
10 September 2023 First round qualifying	Preston North End Women FC	3–1	Altrincham

01 October 2023 Second round qualifying	Crewe Alexandra	2–0	Preston North End

== Technical staff ==
Below is a list of non-playing personnel:

Name	Role
Nigel Greenwood	First Team co-manager
David Rawcliffe	First Team co-manager

== Players ==
=== Squad ===
Note: Flags indicate national team as defined under FIFA eligibility rules; some limited exceptions apply. Players may hold more than one non-FIFA nationality.

No.	Pos.	Nation	Player
—			Samantha Ball
—			Tilly-Mae Bibby
—			Sarah-Jane Bolton
—			Safia Brophy
—			Eleanor Collins
—			Abigail Cookson
—			Sophie Coward
—			Amber Cragg
—			Grace Cronshaw
—			Ellie Ditchfield
—			Emma Dodsworth
—			Grace Doughty
—			Justine Elliott
—			Abigail Fenton
—			Ellie Fleming
—			Emma Foster
—			Olivia Golden
—			Charlotte Greenwood
—			Taylor Griffiths

No.	Pos.	Nation	Player
—			Madison Hadley
—			Dani Hajdukiewicz
—			Abbie Jones
—			Lucy Alicia Longworth
—			Megan Mercer
—			Jess Mitchinson
—			Kaydie-Mae Morrin
—			Evie Murray
—			Annabelle Quigley
—			Ella Radcliffe
—			Alicia Scott
—			Jasmine Skiba
—			Ella Thorpe
—			Emma Tunstall
—			Mischa Turner
—			Eve Walker
—			Abigail Wignall
—			Caitlin Wolfenden
—			Courtney Woodhead
—			Katie Woodhead

== Statistics ==
Players with no appearances are not included on the list; italics indicate a loaned in player

No.	Pos	Nat	Player	Total		North West Division One North		Cup Games	
No.	Pos	Nat	Player	Apps	Goals	Apps	Goals	Apps	Goals
			Samantha Ball	6	2	6	2		
			Elanor Collins	10	0	10	0		
			Abigail Cookson	7	1	7	1		
			Ellie Ditchfield	2	0	2	0		
			Emma Dodsworth	5	0	5	0		
			Justine Elliott	13	10	13	10		
			Abigail Fenton	3	0	3	0		
			Ellie Flemming	9	0	9	0		
			Charlotte Greenwood	10	1	10	1		
			Madison Hadley	12	0	12	0		
			Dani Hajdukiewicz	3	0	3	0		
			Katie Higham	7	5	7	5		
			Abbie Jones	10	0	10	0		
			Megan Mercer	5	1	5	1		
			Annabelle Quigley	10	1	10	1		
			Ella Radcliffe	11	0	11	0		
			Alicia Scott	13	2	13	2		
			Jasmine Skiba	1	0	1	0		
			Eve Walker	3	0	3	0		
			Abigail Wignall	4	2	4	2		
			Caitlin Wolfenden	10	1	10	1		
			Courtney Woodhead	13	4	13	4		
			Katie Woodhead	13	10	13	10		
