= 2024–25 Preston North End W.F.C. season =

English football club season

Preston North End Women
2024–25 season
- Manager: Mark Steele
- Stadium: Inglewhite Road
- North West Division One North: 4th
- FA Cup: 1st Round Proper
- North West Regional Cup: Preliminary
- North West Regional Plate: Semi-Final
- Top goalscorer: League: Madison Hadley (30); All: Madison Hadley (36)
- Biggest win: 14-0 vs Clitheroe Wolves
- Biggest defeat: 7-3 vs Accrington Stanley First Team
Home colours	Away colours	Third colours

The 2024–25 season saw Preston North End Women's Football Club competing in the North West Women's Division One North, finishing in fourth place.

This was a season of change as Mark Steele, Cameron Molloy and Logan De Klerk were confirmed as the new Manager and First Team Coaches of the team. Over the summer, North End Women and Longridge Town confirmed a partnership for PNE Women to use Inglewhite Road as their home ground.

This season was also notable for Preston North End reaching the semi-final of the Alliance Design and Print Plate. It is also the season where striker Madison Hadley won the FA Cup Golden Ball, scoring 11 goals in four games.

== Competitions ==
=== Overall record ===
Competition	First match	Last match	Starting round	Final position	Record							
Competition	First match	Last match	Starting round	Final position	Pld	W	D	L	GF	GA	GD	Win %
North West Women's Division One North	18 August 2025	27 April 2025	Matchday 1	4th	22	13	4	5	69	28	+41	59.09
FA Cup	01 September 2024	3 November 2024	First Round Qualification	1st Round Proper	4	3	0	1	26	2	+24	75.00
North West Women's Regional Cup	10 November 2024	10 November 2024	Preliminary Round	Preliminary	1	0	0	1	7	3	+4	0.00
North West Regional Plate	26 January 2025	06 April 2025	First Round	Semi-final	4	3	0	1	12	6	+6	75.00
Total					31	19	4	8	114	39	+75	61.29

=== North West Women's Division One North ===
==== Matches ====
Win Draw Loss Fixtures

18 August 2025 1	Fleetwood Town Wrens Ladies Reserves	1 - 8	Preston North End Women	Blackpool
14:00 (BST)		Report		Stadium: Blackpool Wren Rovers FC; Attendance: 50

21 August 2024 2	Accrington Stanley Women FC First	1 - 0	Preston North End Women	Accrington
19:30		Report		Stadium: Accrington and Rossendale College 3G

25 August 2024 3	Haslingden Ladies & Girls Ladies	0 - 1	Preston North End Women	Bacup
14:00 (BST)		Report		Stadium: Valley Leadership Academy; Attendance: 0

28 August 2024 4	Preston North End Women	4 - 0	Fleetwood Town Wrens Ladies Reserves	Longridge
19:00		Report		Stadium: Inglewhite Road

08 September 2024 5	Preston North End Women	3 - 2	Morecambe FC Women	Longridge
14:00		Report		Stadium: Inglewhite Road

15 September 2024 6	Preston North End Women	1 - 3	Bolton Wanderers Girls FC Women	Longridge
14:00		Report		Stadium: Inglewhite Road

29 September 2024 7	Hindley Juniors Women	1 - 7	Preston North End Women	Hindley
14:00		Report		Stadium: Hindley Juniors FC; Attendance: 34

06 October 2024 8	Preston North End Women	3 - 1	Penrith AFC Ladies	Longridge
14:00		Report		Stadium: Inglewhite Road

15 December 2024 9	Workington Town Women FC First	2 - 2	Preston North End Women	Workington
14:00		Report		Stadium: Fibrus Community Stadium; Attendance: 100

02 February 2025 10	Penrith AFC Ladies	4 - 2	Preston North End Women	Penrith
14:00		Report		Stadium: Frenchfield Park; Referee: Scott Taylor

23 February 2025 11	Blackpool F.C. Girls and Ladies	4 - 1	Preston North End Women	Blackpool
14:00		Report		Stadium: The Mechanics, Jepson Way; Referee: David Hesketh

02 March 2025 12	Preston North End Women	5 - 1	Atherton Laburnum Rovers Ladies	Longridge
14:00		Report		Stadium: Inglewhite Road; Referee: Benjamin Mason

06 March 2025 13	Preston North End Women	9 - 0	Hindley Juniors Women	Longridge
19:45		Report		Stadium: Inglewhite Road

16 March 2025 14	Preston North End Women	0 - 0	Blackpool F.C. Girls and Ladies	Longridge
14:00		Report		Stadium: Inglewhite Road; Referee: David Hesketh

20 March 2025 15	Preston North End Women	5 - 0	Radcliffe FC Women	Longridge
19:45		Report		Stadium: Inglewhite Road; Referee: Frederick Mensah

23 March 2025 16	Preston North End Women	3 - 0	Workington Town Women FC First	Longridge
14:00		Report		Stadium: Inglewhite Road; Attendance: 80; Referee: David Hesketh

26 March 2025 17	Morecambe FC Women	1 - 6	Preston North End Women	Morecambe
19:45		Report		Stadium: Trimpell Sports & Social Club; Referee: Lexie Ball

30 March 2025 18	Preston North End Women	2 - 1	Haslingden Ladies & Girls Ladies	Longridge
14:00		Report		Stadium: Inglewhite Road

03 April 2025 19	Radcliffe FC Women	1 - 5	Preston North End Women	Radcliffe
19:45		Report		Stadium: Stainton Park; Referee: Liam Paul

13 April 2025 20	Atherton Laburnum Rovers Ladies	1 - 1	Preston North End Women	Atherton
14:00		Report		Stadium: Crilly Park; Referee: Chris Ngosong

20 April 2025 21	Bolton Wanderers Girls FC Women	3 - 0	Preston North End Women	Horwich
14:00		Report		Stadium: Toughsheet Community Stadium; Attendance: 2500; Referee: Liam Paul

27 April 2025 22	Preston North End Women	1 - 1	Accrington Stanley Women FC First	Longridge
14:00		Report		Stadium: Inglewhite Road; Referee: Liam Paul

=== FA Cup ===
==== Matches ====
01 September 2024 Qualification - 1st Round	Preston North End Women	14 - 0	Clitheroe Wolves	Longridge
14:00		Report		Stadium: Inglewhite Road

22 September 2024 Qualification - 2nd Round	Preston North End Women	6 - 0	Maghull Youth	Longridge
14:00		Report		Stadium: Inglewhite Road; Attendance: 110

13 October 2024 Qualification - 3rd Round	Preston North End Women	5 - 0	Hartlepool Pools Youth	Longridge
14:00		Report		Stadium: Inglewhite Road

3 November 2024 1st Round	Preston North End Women	1 - 2	Bradford City	Longridge
		Report		Stadium: Inglewhite Road

=== North West Women's Regional Cup ===
==== Matches ====
10 November 2024 2nd Round	Accrington Stanley Women FC First	7 - 3	Preston North End Women	Accrington
14:00		Report		Stadium: Accrington and Rossendale College 3G

=== North West Women's Regional Plate ===
==== Matches ====
26 January 2025 1st Round	West Didsbury & Chorlton AFC Womens	3 - 4 (2-3 p)	Preston North End Women	Chorlton
14:00		Report		Stadium: Step Places Stadium; Attendance: 92; Referee: Alan Sivori

09 February 2025 2nd Round	Fleetwood Town Wrens Ladies Reserves	0 - 5	Preston North End Women	Blackpool
14:00		Report		Stadium: Blackpool Wren Rovers FC; Attendance: 50; Referee: Benjamin Mason

09 March 2025 Quarter Final	Preston North End Women	3 - 1	Warrington Town FC Women	Longridge
14:00		Report		Stadium: Inglewhite Road; Referee: Jordan Lock

06 April 2025 Semi-Final	Curzon Ashton FC Women	2 - 0	Preston North End Women	Ashton-under-Lyne
14:00		Report		Stadium: Tameside Stadium; Referee: David Nugent

== Technical staff ==
Below is a list of non-playing personnel:

Name	Role
Mark Steele	First Team manager
Cameron Molloy	First Team coach
Logan De Klerk	First Team coach

== Players ==
=== Squad ===
Note: Flags indicate national team as defined under FIFA eligibility rules; some limited exceptions apply. Players may hold more than one non-FIFA nationality.

No.	Pos.	Nation	Player
—			Samantha Ball
—			Hannah Brindle
—			Jess Clayton
—			Freya Clements
—			Chloe Cook
—			Amber Cragg
—			Grace Cronshaw
—			Rachel Darbyshire
—			Emma Dodsworth
—			Amelia Eastham
—			Lexie Eastham
—			Ellie Fleming
—			Emma Foster
—			Emily Gibbins
—			Taylor Griffiths
—			Madison Hadley
—			Dani Hajdukiewicz
—			Katie Higham
—			Amy Hindle
—			Chloe Houlihan

No.	Pos.	Nation	Player
—			Abbie Jones
—			Kerry Mahon
—			Jess Mitchinson
—			Evie Murray
—			Jennifer Pike
—			Annabelle Quigley
—			Alicia Scott
—			Jasmine Skiba
—			Lucy Stevens
—			Abbie Sunners
—			Lisa Topping
—			Emma TUNSTALL
—			emilia vickers
—			Laura Walker
—			Caitlin Wolfenden
—			Courtney Woodhead
—			Katie Woodhead
—			Olivia Wright

== Statistics ==
Players with no appearances are not included on the list; italics indicate a loaned in player

No.	Pos	Nat	Player	Total		North West Division One North		Cup Games	
No.	Pos	Nat	Player	Apps	Goals	Apps	Goals	Apps	Goals
			Samantha Ball	4	0	3	0	1	0
			Hannah Brindle	11	0	11	0	0	0
			Jess Clayton	1	0	1	0	0	0
			Freya Clements	2	0	2	0	0	0
			Chloe Cook	4	1	3	1	1	0
			Abigail Cookson	7	0	7	0	0	0
			Amber Cragg	6	0	4	0	2	0
			Grace Cronshaw	17	5	14	5	3	0
			Rachel Darbyshire	1	0	1	0	0	0
			Emma Dodsworth	7	1	6	1	1	0
			Amelia Eastham	4	0	4	0	0	0
			Ellie Flemming	4	0	4	0	0	0
			Emily Gibbins	19	0	14	0	5	0
			Taylor Griffiths	9	0	6	0	3	0
			Madison Hadley	25	36	20	30	5	6
			Katie Hingham	8	1	7	1	1	0
			Amy Hindle	26	1	22	0	4	1
			Chloe Houlihan	1	0	1	0	0	0
			Abbie Jones	21	1	18	1	3	0
			Kerry Mahon	11	2	9	2	2	0
			Jess Mitchinson	2	0	2	0	0	0
			Jennifer Pike	21	8	16	7	5	1
			Isobel Prince	0	0	0	0	0	0
			Annabelle Quigley	1	0	1	0	0	0
			Alicia Scott	27	9	22	8	5	1
			Jasmine Skiba	8	0	7	0	1	0
			Lucy Stevens	25	1	20	1	5	0
			Abbie Sunners	2	0	2	0	0	0
			Lisa Topping	8	1	8	1	0	0
			Emma Tunstall	17	5	13	5	4	0
			Laura Walker	26	4	21	3	5	1
			Melissa Whittle	0	0	0	0	0	0
			Caitlin Wolfenden	14	4	11	2	3	2
			Courtney Woodhead	15	1	12	1	3	0
			Katie Woodhead	19	5	16	2	3	3
			Olivia Wright	14	0	11	0	3	0
