= Newton Heath and Moston tram stop =

Manchester Metrolink tram stop

Newton Heath and Moston
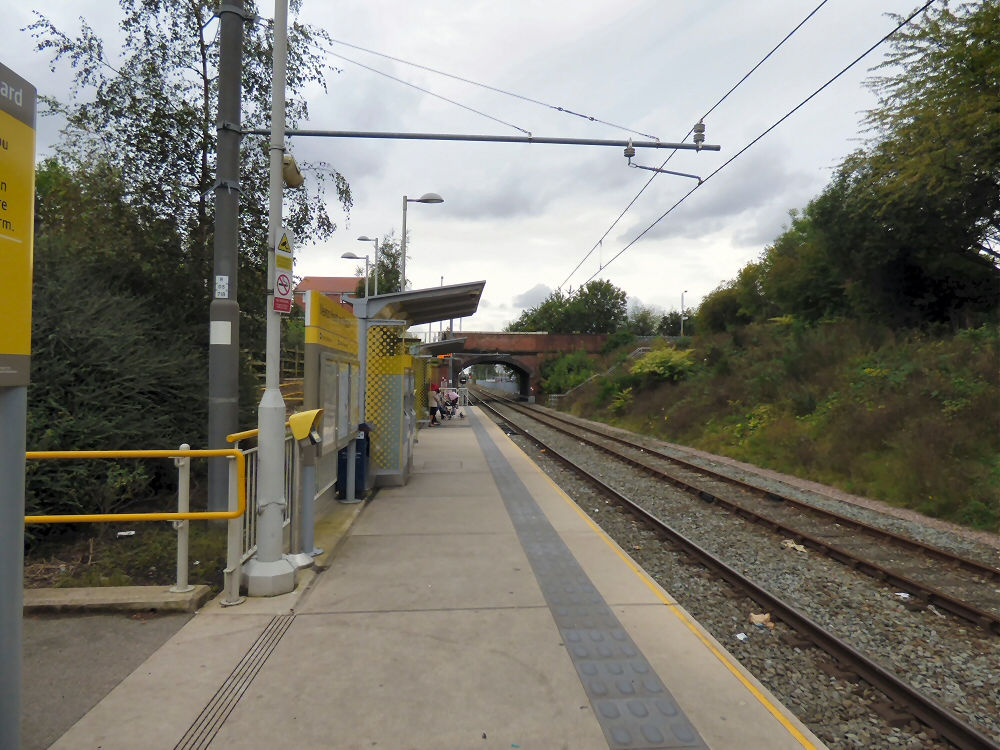
- Newton Heath and Moston looking west, September 2016.

General information
- Location: Newton Heath, Manchester; England
- Coordinates: 53.50425°N 2.18371°W
- Grid reference: SD879008
- System: Manchester Metrolink
- Operator: KeolisAmey
- Transit authority: Transport for Greater Manchester
- Line: Oldham and Rochdale Line
- Platforms: 1
- Tram routes

Construction
- Structure type: Below-grade
- Accessible: Yes

Other information
- Status: In operation
- Station code: NHM
- Fare zone: 2/3
- Website: Newton Heath and Moston tram stop

History
- Opened: 13 June 2012; 14 years ago
- Former names: Dean Lane

Key dates
- 17 May 1880: Opened as Dean Lane railway station
- 3 October 2009: Closed for Metrolink conversion
- 13 June 2012: Opened as Newton Heath and Moston tram stop

Passengers
- 2007/08: ▲29,228
- 2008/09: ▲46,548
- 2021/22: ▲0.178 million
- 2022/23: ▲0.271 million
- 2023/24: ▲0.308 million
Route map
Location

Newton Heath and Moston is a Manchester Metrolink tram stop in Newton Heath, Manchester. It is on the Oldham and Rochdale Line and in both fare zones 2 and 3. This stop was opened to Metrolink on 13 June 2012, after previously serving as a railway station from 1880 to 2009. This stop has step-free access.

The stop is located east of and below the Dean Lane road bridge in a railway cutting. It is near to Newton Heath TMD and Lightbowne Country Park, and the tram stop only has a single platform.

== History ==
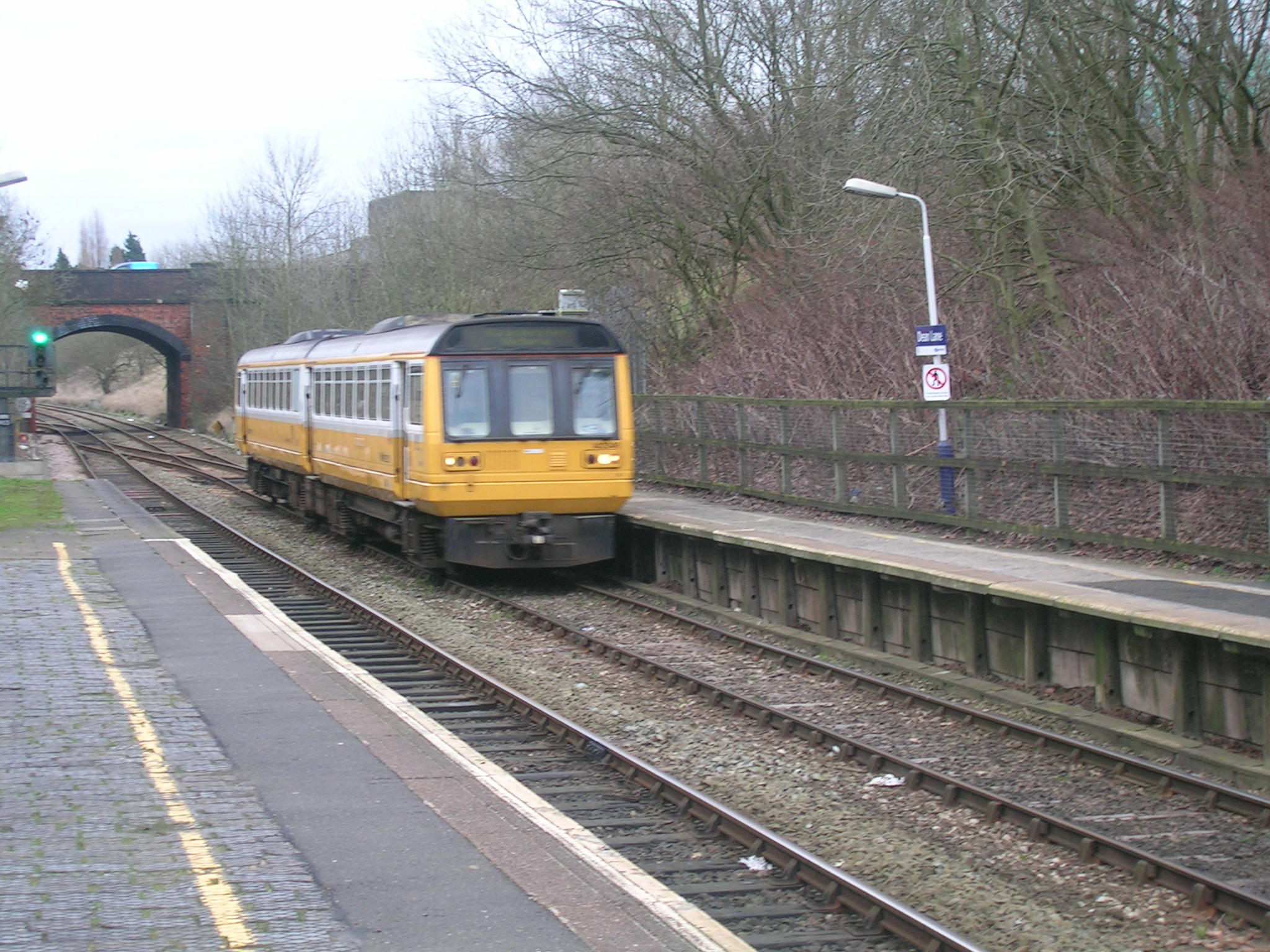
A Northern Rail service to Manchester Victoria approaching Dean Lane station: January 2008.

Dean Lane railway station opened on 17 May 1880 with two platforms, 2.5 miles (4.0 km) north-east of Manchester Victoria along with the Oldham Loop Line section between Newton Heath and Oldham, and was operated and managed by Northern Rail in 2009 before its closure. There were once three stations in Newton Heath: Newton Heath, Dean Lane and Park. This station is 200 yards (180 m) away from Newton Heath TMD.

This railway line was included in proposals in 1984 for conversion to light rail, and following October 2009, the entire line closed for conversion to Metrolink operation, which included Dean Lane railway station. The Manchester platform was demolished by summer 2010 as the new single Metrolink platform was to be built in its place, however the space taken up by the Rochdale platform was not needed for the Metrolink, so it was fully removed afterward at some point in 2011. It re-opened as a Metrolink light rail/tram stop on 13 June 2012 with only a single platform (in place of where the demolished Manchester-bound platform was) and a single track in use by trams in both directions.

Road signs still existed with Dean Lane railway station on them in 2024.

== Layout ==
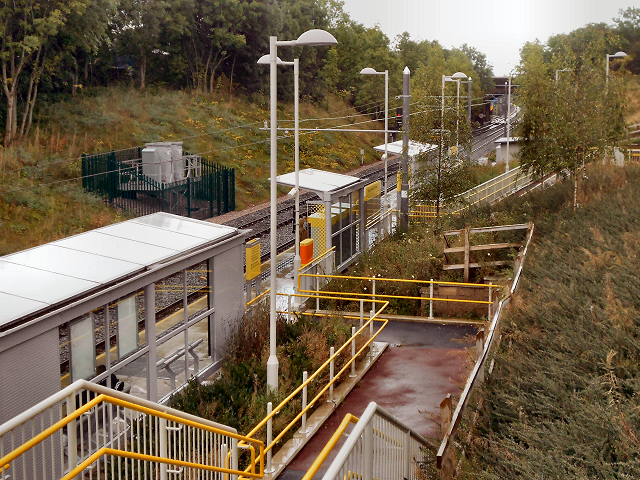
View of the layout of Newton Heath and Moston: September 2012

=== Tram stop ===
Newton Heath and Moston has one platform serving one track only and was constructed with accessibility in mind. There are two entrances to the station, one via a short path and steps, another by a disabled access ramp winding down to platform level.

Two dot matrix passenger information displays stand on each side of the platform each, each showing estimated arrival times for trams in minutes up to 30 minutes prior (up to three at a time) and number of carriages. One at the east end shows departures towards Shaw and Crompton and Rochdale Town Centre, another at the west end shows departures towards East Didsbury.

=== Track layout ===
The Metrolink uses the southern light rail track in the railway cutting: the north track is heavy rail, still owned by Network Rail, and allows freight trains to access the Greater Manchester Waste Disposal facility nearby.

For the Metrolink, the tracks reduce from double to single for about 850 metres, and is the second longest singled section of the Metrolink.

== Services ==
Every route across the Manchester Metrolink network operates to a 12-minute headway (5 tph) Monday–Saturday, and to a 15-minute headway (4 tph) on Sundays and bank holidays. Sections served by a second "peak only" route (like this stop) will have a combined headway of 6 minutes during peak times.

Newton Heath and Moston is located in Zone 2 and 3, and the stop itself has one platform. Trams towards Manchester heading to East Didsbury via Exchange Square will stop at the west end of the single platform (heading towards the road bridge), and trams towards Rochdale and Shaw via Oldham will stop at the east end of the single platform.

Preceding station	Manchester Metrolink	Following station
Central Park towards East Didsbury	East Didsbury–Rochdale	Failsworth towards Rochdale Town Centre
Central Park towards East Didsbury	East Didsbury–Shaw (peak only)	Failsworth towards Shaw and Crompton
Historical railways
Miles Platting (closed 1995)	Lancashire and Yorkshire Railway; Oldham Loop Line	Failsworth

== Transport connections ==
=== Bus ===
Newton Heath and Moston tram stop is served closest by Bee Network bus routes 81 (Manchester–Oldham) on Coalshaw Green Road, and 159 (Middleton–Oldham) on Stanley Road.

=== Train ===
This tram stop is not connected to or near to any railway stations, but the nearest is Moston, about 1.7 miles (2.7 km) away walking.

== See also ==
- Newton Heath TMD
