= Newton Heath railway station =

Former railway station in Greater Manchester, England

Newton Heath
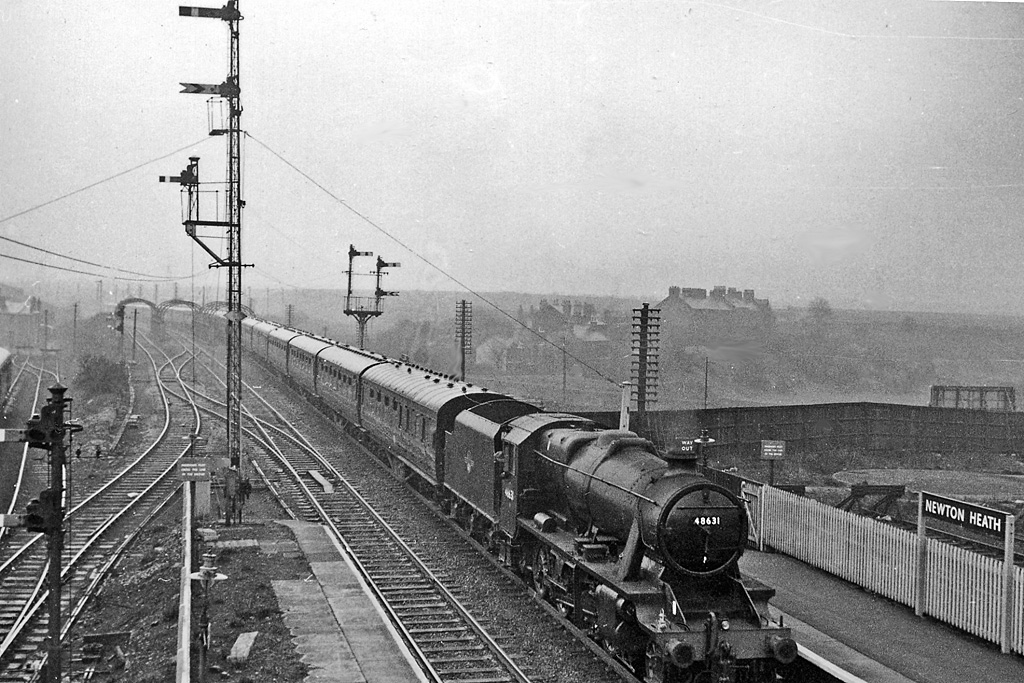
- Westbound empty stock train, 1962

General information
- Location: Newton Heath, City of Manchester, England
- Coordinates: 53.5062°N 2.1862°W
- Grid reference: SD877011
- Platforms: 2

Other information
- Status: Disused

History
- Original company: Lancashire and Yorkshire Railway
- Pre-grouping: Lancashire and Yorkshire Railway
- Post-grouping: London, Midland and Scottish Railway

Key dates
- 1 December 1853: Opened
- 3 January 1966: Closed
Location

Newton Heath railway station served the district of Newton Heath, in east Manchester, England. It was opened by the Lancashire and Yorkshire Railway (LYR) on 1 December 1853 and was closed by British Rail on 3 January 1966.

== Description ==
The station buildings were situated on the north-west side of Dean Lane, where that road passed over the LYR line from Manchester Victoria to Rochdale, and 300 yards north of Dean Lane. It was immediately adjacent to the large LYR Newton Heath steam locomotive shed.

== Services ==
Preceding station	Disused railways	Following station
Miles Platting	Lancashire and Yorkshire Railway	Moston

== The site today ==
The Railway Hotel remains in operation at the former station site.

The area is now served by Newton Heath and Moston tram stop, which opened on 13 June 2012.
