= Preston North End F.C. =

Association football club in Preston, England

Preston North End
- Full name: Preston North End Football Club
- Nicknames: The Lilywhites; The Invincibles
- Short name: PNE
- Founded: 1880 (146 years ago)
- Ground: Deepdale
- Capacity: 23,404
- Owner: Wordon Limited
- Chairman: Ian Penrose
- Manager: Graham Alexander
- League: EFL Championship
- 2025–26: EFL Championship, 14th of 24
- Website: pnefc.net
Home colours	Away colours	Third colours

Preston North End Football Club, commonly referred to as Preston, North End or PNE, is a professional association football club in Preston, Lancashire, England. They currently play in the EFL Championship, the second level of the English football league system.

Originally a cricket club, Preston North End has been based at Deepdale since 1875. The club first took up football in 1878 as a winter fitness activity, and decided to focus on it in May 1880, when the football club was officially founded. Deepdale is now football's oldest ground in terms of continuous use by a league club. Preston North End was a founder member of the Football League in 1888. In the 1888–89 season, the team won both the inaugural league championship and the FA Cup, the latter without conceding a goal. They were the first team to achieve the "Double" in English football and, as they were unbeaten in all matches, are remembered as "The Invincibles". Preston won the league championship again in 1889–90 but their only major success since then has been their 1938 FA Cup final victory over Huddersfield Town. The club's most famous players have been Sir Tom Finney, Alan Kelly Sr. and Bill Shankly, who are all commemorated at Deepdale by stands named after them.

Until 1961, Preston were usually members of the First Division but, having been relegated after the 1960–61 season, they have not yet returned to the top flight. They were first relegated to the Third Division in the 1969–70 season and spent most of the next 30 years in the bottom two divisions of the Football League, including 19 consecutive seasons from 1981–82 to 1999–2000. Preston has faced serious financial issues and was twice in danger of closure. The club was owned by businessman Trevor Hemmings until his death in October 2021 and has been in the EFL Championship since gaining promotion in 2015, with a highest finishing position since then of 7th (2017–18).

== History ==
Chart showing the progress of Preston North End F.C. through the English football league system

Preston North End was founded in 1863, originally as a cricket club, and played their first matches at the Marsh near the River Ribble in the Preston suburb of Ashton. Later that year, they switched to Moor Park in the north of the town, calling themselves "North End" in recognition of the new location. On 21 January 1875, the club leased a field opposite Moor Park on the site of the current Deepdale stadium, which has been its home ever since.

The club formed a rugby union team in 1877 as a winter fitness activity but this was not a success and, a year later, they played their first game under the rules of association football. In May 1880, a proposal to fully adopt the association code was unanimously accepted and Preston North End Football Club was officially founded.

Preston became one of the first professional clubs by hiring players from Scotland. The players who came from Scotland to play in England in those days were known as the Scotch Professors. In the 1887-88 season, they beat Hyde 26–0 in the first round of the FA Cup, still a record winning margin in English first-class football. Scottish forward Jimmy Ross scored eight goals in the match before going on to score 19 goals in the competition that season, also still a record.

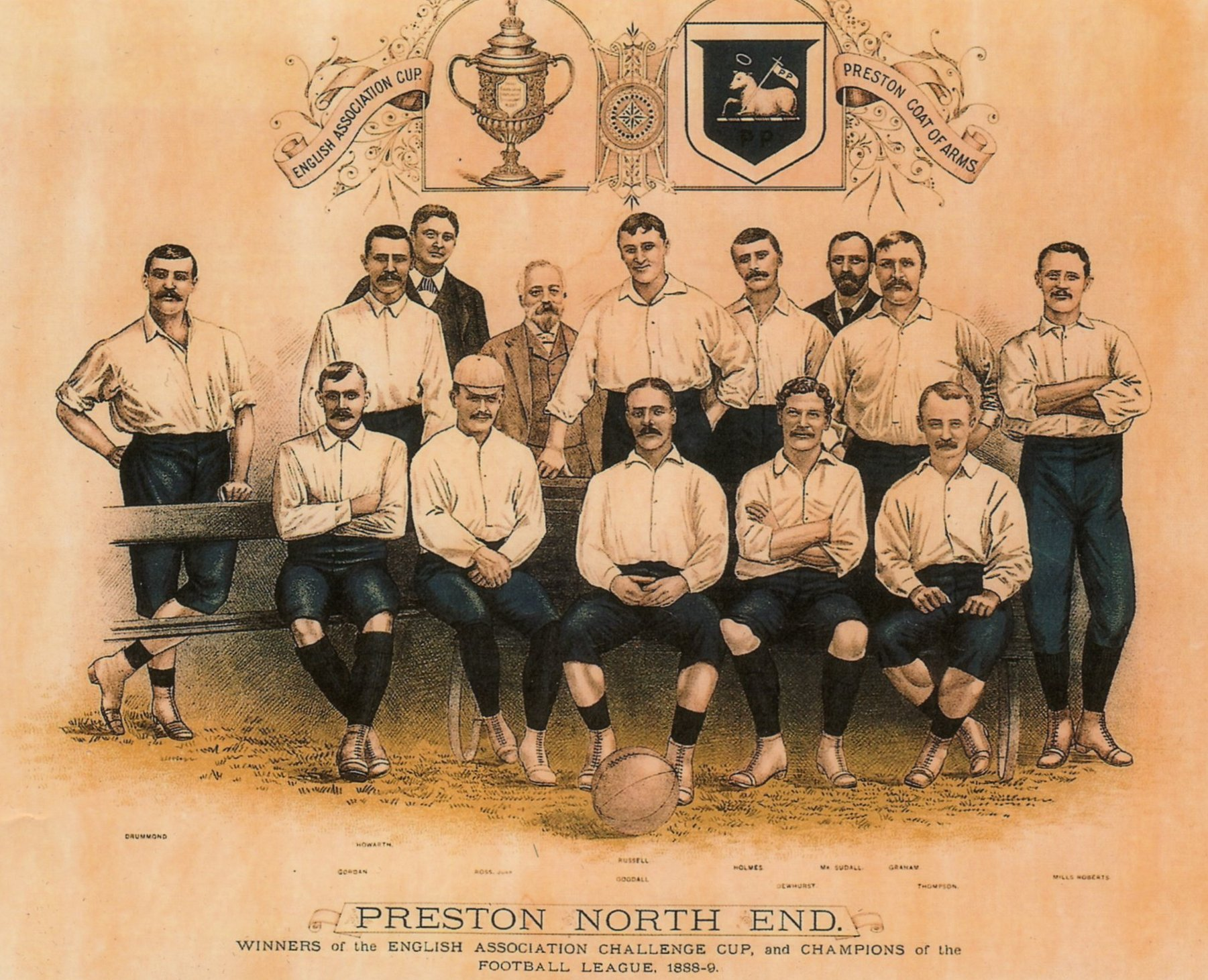
illustration of the 1888–89 Preston North End, the first Football League champions, subsequently doing 'The Double'

In 1888–89, Preston became the first league champions and the first winners of "The Double", becoming the only team to date to go throughout an entire season unbeaten in both the league and FA Cup – winning the FA Cup without conceding a goal. The team did so with a majority of their team being made up of Scottish players (the Scotch Professors). In a contribution to Paul Agnew's 1989 biography of Tom Finney, the player himself wrote: "The club has long been known as Proud Preston, and the Old Invincibles of the previous century set some incredible standards". The author wrote elsewhere: "...and that team became immortalised as the 'Old Invincibles'". Other sources call the team "The Invincibles" and both versions of the nickname have been used. In his autobiography, Finney wrote: "The championship stayed with North End—by now tagged the Old Invincibles—the following year, but runners-up spot had to suffice for the next three seasons". As Finney said, Preston were league champions again in 1889–90, but have not won the title since. In total, they have been league runners-up six times, including the three consecutive seasons from 1890–91 to 1892–93, and twice in the 1950s when Finney was playing. The club's last major trophy win was in the 1938 FA Cup Final when they defeated Huddersfield Town 1–0 and the team included Bill Shankly, Andy Beattie and goalscorer George Mutch.

Preston's most famous player, Tom Finney, joined the club as a teenager in 1938. His first team debut was delayed until 1946 by the Second World War but he played for Preston until he retired in 1960. He was nicknamed the "Preston Plumber" because of his local business. Finney remains the club's top goalscorer, with 187 goals from 433 appearances, and also scored 30 international goals for England in 76 appearances.

A year after Finney's retirement, Preston were relegated to the Second Division and have not played in the top division since. They had a memorable season in 1963–64 when, managed by former player Jimmy Milne, they finished third in the Second Division and reached the 1964 FA Cup Final where they lost a thrilling match 3–2 to West Ham United.

Preston were first relegated to the Third Division after the 1969–70 season. Although they won promotion again immediately, the team have spent 28 of the 49 seasons since 1970 in the bottom two divisions, including a span of 19 seasons from 1981–82 to 1999–2000. The club experienced a near-terminal decline in the 1980s which brought about the very real threat of closure, the nadir being the 1985–86 season when they finished 23rd in the Fourth Division and had to seek re-election to the league.

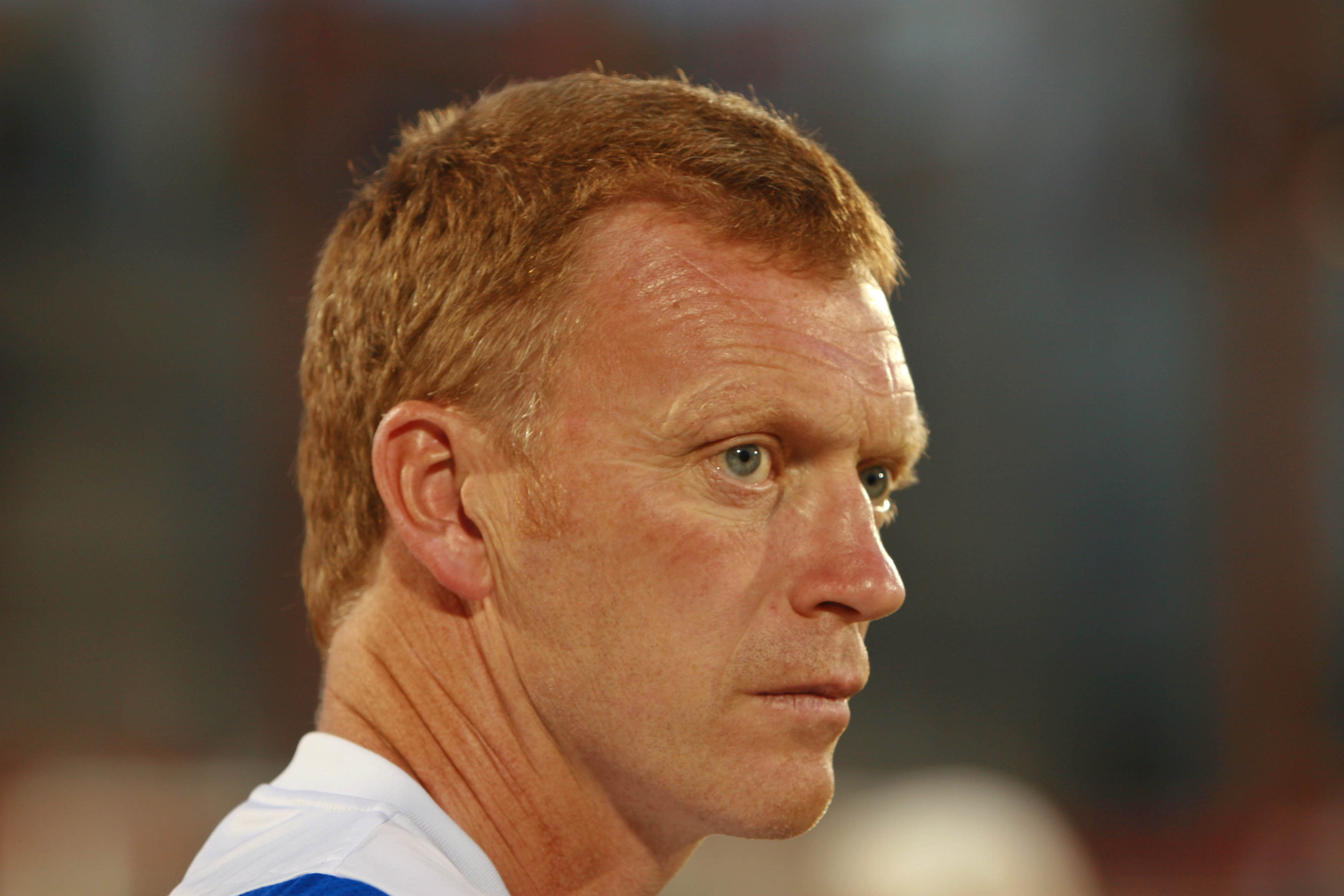
Under David Moyes, Preston were Division Two champions in 2000, and narrowly missed out on promotion to the Premier League the following season.

Under manager John McGrath, the team recovered and won promotion back to the Third Division only a year later but it was a false dawn as the team spent another three years in the bottom division from 1993 to 1996. The club finally began to recover and move forward after a takeover by heating manufacturer Baxi in 1994 but their ownership ended in June 2002. The team's central defender David Moyes, then aged 34, began his managerial career when appointed by the Baxi-controlled board in February 1998. Moyes was successful and managed the team to the third tier championship in 2000. Preston reached the 2001 play-off final but were defeated by Bolton Wanderers. In the 2005 play-off final, under Moyes' successor Billy Davies, Preston were beaten 1–0 by West Ham United.

Following the Baxi sell-off and the departure of Moyes to Everton in 2002, the team was established at second-tier level through the 2000s but more problems arose at the end of the decade with an HM Revenue and Customs winding-up order in 2010 and relegation to the third tier in 2011. The taxation issue was resolved by local businessman Trevor Hemmings, already a shareholder, who bought a controlling interest in June 2010. The team were promoted again, via the play-offs, in 2015 and have remained in the EFL Championship since then, with a highest finishing position of 7th in the 2017–18 season.

Preston North End reached the 2024–25 FA Cup quarter-finals but they lost 3–0 against Aston Villa at Deepdale.

== Ground ==
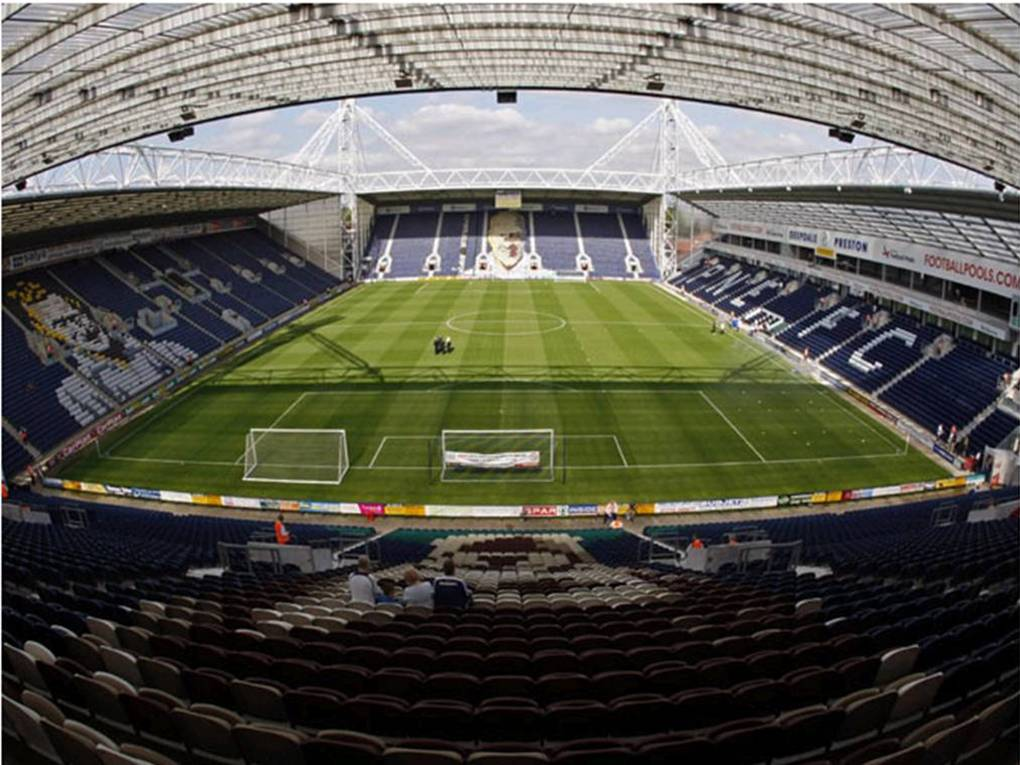
Deepdale stadium

Deepdale was the original cricket club's home from 1875 and has been a football venue from 1878. It is the world's oldest football ground in terms of continuous use by a club in a major league. The biggest attendance seen was 42,684 for a Division One clash with Arsenal in April 1938.

When Baxi took control, it embarked on an investment programme between 1996 and 2009 with the aim of upgrading Deepdale into a modern stadium. The old ground was demolished and rebuilt in four stages and the last of the new stands was opened in 2008. The stadium has a seated capacity of 23,404. The current pitch dimensions are 110 x 75 yards.

Part of the Baxi-funded redevelopment was the original National Football Museum, which opened at Deepdale in 2001 but was relocated to Manchester in 2012 after being closed for two years.

=== Statue ===
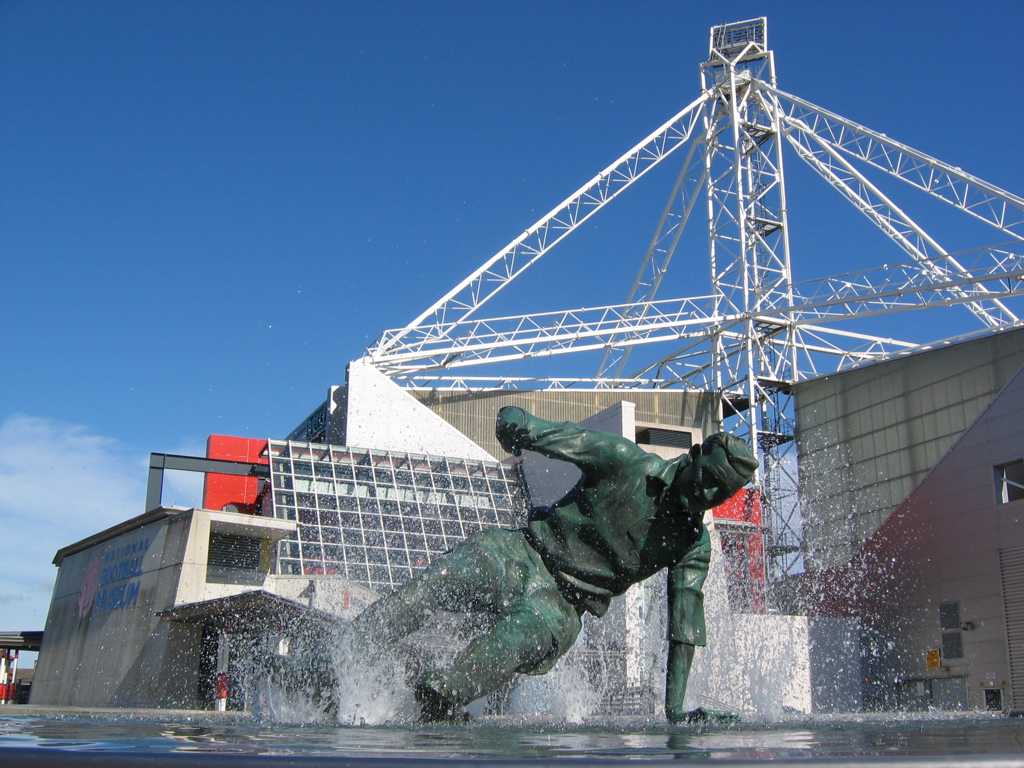
The Splash commemorates Preston legend Tom Finney.

Outside the Sir Tom Finney Stand is a statue of the famous player himself, which is known as "The Splash" or the "Tom Finney Splash". The statue, sculpted by Peter Hodgkinson and unveiled in July 2004, was inspired by a famous photograph taken at the Chelsea versus Preston game in 1956, played at Stamford Bridge in particularly wet conditions.

=== 1913 terrorist incident ===
An attempt was made to destroy the ground in 1913. As part of the suffragette bombing and arson campaign, suffragettes carried out a series of bombings and arson attacks nationwide during their campaign for women's suffrage. In April 1913, suffragettes attempted to burn down Deepdale's grandstand but were foiled. In the same year, suffragettes succeeded in burning down Arsenal's then South London stadium, and also attempted to burn down Blackburn Rovers' ground. More traditionally male sports were targeted in order to protest against male dominance.

== Sponsorship and kits ==
Preston North End have traditionally worn white shirts with blue shorts for their home kit, with yellow being a common colour for Preston's away kit. The club's main sponsors, since shirt sponsorship was introduced in 1979, have been as follows:

Years	Sponsor(s)
1979–1984	Pontins
1984–1985	David Leil
1985–1986	Lombard Continental
1986–1990	Garratt's Insurance
1990–1992	Ribble Valley Shelving
1992–1995	Coloroll
1995–2002	Baxi
2002–2005	New Reg
2005–2010	Enterprise
2010–2012	Tennent's
2012–2013	Magners
2013–2014	The Football Pools/Carers Trust
2014–2016	Virgin Trains
2016–2017	888sport
2017–2018	Tempobet
2018–2021	32Red
2021–2025	PAR Group
2025–	SpudBros

== Rivalries ==
Historically, Preston North End's main rivalry is with Blackpool—the two clubs' grounds being seventeen miles apart—and the West Lancashire derby between the two clubs has been contested 96 times across all four divisions of the Football League and cup competitions since 1901. Preston's other local rivals in the league over the years include Blackburn Rovers, Burnley, Bolton Wanderers and Wigan Athletic.

== Players ==
As of 6 November 2026

=== Current squad ===
Note: Flags indicate national team as defined under FIFA eligibility rules; some limited exceptions apply. Players may hold more than one non-FIFA nationality.

No.	Pos.	Nation	Player
1	GK	DEN	Daniel Iversen
2	DF	ESP	Pol Valentín
3	DF	MNE	Andrija Vukčević
4	DF	ENG	Harry Clarke
5	MF	SCO	Greg Docherty
6	DF	SCO	Liam Lindsay
7	MF	ENG	Alfie Devine
8	MF	NIR	Ali McCann (captain)
9	FW	SWE	Jusef Erabi (on loan from KRC Genk)
10	FW	ENG	Callum Lang
11	DF	ENG	Thierry Small
12	DF	USA	Caleb Wiley (on loan from Chelsea)
14	DF	ENG	Jordan Storey
15	MF	NIR	Jordan Thompson

No.	Pos.	Nation	Player
16	DF	WAL	Andrew Hughes
17	MF	ENG	Stanley Mills
19	DF	ENG	Lewis Gibson
20	MF	ENG	Liam Gibbs (on loan from Norwich City)
21	GK	ENG	Lee Nicholls
23	MF	IRL	Andrew Moran
24	DF	ENG	Odel Offiah
27	MF	FRA	Léo Leroy
30	FW	ENG	George Gryba
32	DF	ENG	Ed Nolan
37	FW	NED	Delano Burgzorg (on loan from Middlesbrough)
38	FW	IRL	Johnny Kenny
44	MF	ENG	Brad Potts

=== Players out on loan ===
Note: Flags indicate national team as defined under FIFA eligibility rules; some limited exceptions apply. Players may hold more than one non-FIFA nationality.

No.	Pos.	Nation	Player
34	MF	ENG	Kitt Nelson (on loan to Linfield)
41	GK	ENG	Li-Bau Stowell (on loan to Chorley)

== Technical staff ==
Below is a list of non-playing personnel:

Name	Role
Graham Alexander	First Team manager
Chris Lucketti	Assistant manager
Jason Euell	First Team coach
Carlo Nash	Goalkeeping coach
Youl Mawéné	Head of Performance and Fitness
Scott Dyer	Head of Performance Analysis
James Wallace	Head of Recruitment
Tom Reeves	Chief Scout
Ben Smith	Recruitment Analyst
Matt Jackson	Head of Medicine
Nick Harrison	Academy Manager
Andy Livingstone	Head of Academy Recruitment
Paul Huddy	Kitman

== Managerial history ==
As of 28 September 2026

The following is a list of Preston North End managers since 1986, excluding caretakers:

Manager	Nationality	Period	Total					League					
Manager	Nationality	Period	G	W	D	L	Win %	G	W	D	L	Win %	Point Av.
John McGrath	England	1986–1990	192	74	53	65	38.54	165	68	45	54	41.21	1.51
Les Chapman	England	1990–1992	129	44	30	55	34.11	118	39	29	50	33.05	1.24
John Beck	England	1992–1994	99	36	20	43	36.36	87	31	19	37	35.63	1.29
Gary Peters	England	1994–1998	166	72	42	52	43.37	143	63	37	43	44.06	1.58
David Moyes	Scotland	1998–2002	234	113	60	61	48.29	196	95	53	48	48.47	1.72
Craig Brown	Scotland	2002–2004	106	36	30	40	33.96	97	32	28	37	32.99	1.28
Billy Davies	Scotland	2004–2006	101	45	35	21	45.55	87	40	31	16	45.98	1.74
Paul Simpson	England	2006–2007	67	27	14	26	40.30	62	25	14	23	40.32	1.44
Alan Irvine	Scotland	2007–2009	110	45	25	40	40.90	99	40	24	35	40.40	1.45
Darren Ferguson	Scotland	2010	49	13	11	25	26.53	45	11	11	23	24.44	0.98
Phil Brown	England	2011	51	15	15	21	29.41	42	13	11	18	30.95	1.19
Graham Westley	England	2012–2013	62	16	23	23	25.81	52	11	21	20	21.15	1.04
Simon Grayson	England	2013–2017	235	104	74	57	44.26	198	84	67	47	42.42	1.61
Alex Neil	Scotland	2017–2021	140	55	39	46	39.29	129	51	37	41	39.53	1.47
Frankie McAvoy	Scotland	2021	33	14	9	10	42.40	22	8	8	6	36.36	1.45
Ryan Lowe	England	2021–2024	124	47	30	47	37.90	117	45	30	42	38.46	1.38
Paul Heckingbottom	England	2024–2026	32	10	14	8	31.25	28	8	13	7	28.57	1.32
Graham Alexander	Scotland	2026-	0	0	0	0	0.00	0	0	0	0	0.00	0.00

== Club records ==
- Most Goals (Overall): Tom Finney, 210 goals from 473 appearances.
- Most League Goals: Tom Finney, 187 goals from 433 appearances.
- Most Appearances (Overall): Alan Kelly, Sr., 511 appearances (between 1958 and 1973).
- Most League Goals in a Season: Ted Harper, 37 in Football League Second Division, 1932–33
- Record Attendance: 42,684 v Arsenal, Football League First Division, 23 April 1938
- Record Cup Victory: 26–0 v Hyde, FA Cup, 15 October 1887
- Record League Victory: 10–0 v Stoke, Football League Division One, 14 September 1889
- Record Defeat: 0–7 v Blackpool, Division 1, 1 May 1948
- Transfer Record (Paid): £6,000,000 for Alfie Devine from Tottenham Hotspur, July 2026
- Transfer Record (Received): £10,000,000 for Jordan Hugill to West Ham United, January 2018
- Youngest Ever Player: Ethan Walker 16 years and 156 days
- Oldest Ever Player: Bob Kelly 41 years and two months

== Honours ==
In 1996, Preston's Third Division title made them the third club to have been champions of each of the top four professional leagues in English football. This feat was previously achieved by Wolverhampton Wanderers in 1988, and Burnley in 1992, and has since been achieved by Sheffield United and Portsmouth both in 2017.

League

- First Division (level 1)
  - Champions: 1888–89, 1889–90
  - Runners-up: 1890–91, 1891–92, 1892–93, 1905–06, 1952–53, 1957–58
- Second Division (level 2)
  - Champions: 1903–04, 1912–13, 1950–51
  - Runners-up: 1914–15, 1933–34
- Third Division / Second Division / League One (level 3)
  - Champions: 1970–71, 1999–2000
  - Play-off winners: 2015
- Fourth Division / Third Division (level 4)
  - Champions: 1995–96
  - Runners-up: 1986–87

Cup

- FA Cup
  - Winners: 1888–89, 1937–38
  - Runners-up: 1887–88, 1921–22, 1936–37, 1953–54, 1963–64
- FA Charity Shield
  - Runners-up: 1938
- Football League War Cup
  - Winners: 1940–41
- Lancashire Senior Cup
  - Winners: 1886–87, 1892–93, 1894–95, 1899–1900, 1938–39, 1996–97

== Women's football ==
The current Preston North End Women team is playing in the North West Women's Premier League.

Previously, the AFC Fylde Women's team was affiliated with Preston North End W.F.C. until May 2016.
