= Moston railway station =

Railway station in Greater Manchester, England

Coordinates: 53°31′24″N 2°10′16″W

Moston
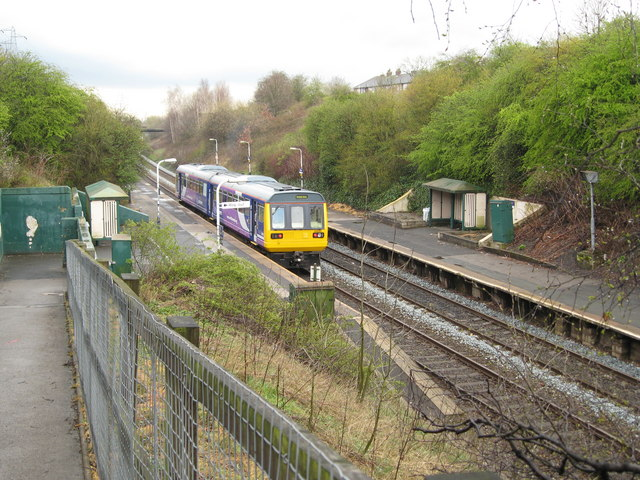
- A Class 142 of Northern Rail calls at the station bound for Manchester Victoria in 2008.

General information
- Location: Moston, Manchester; England
- Grid reference: SD887029
- Managed by: Northern
- Platforms: 2

Other information
- Station code: MSO
- Classification: DfT category F2

Key dates
- February 1872: Station opened

Passengers
- 2020/21: ▼27,374
- 2021/22: ▲54,432
- 2022/23: ▲61,774
- 2023/24: ▲94,478
- 2024/25: ▲0.106 million
Location
Notes
- Passenger statistics from the Office of Rail and Road

Moston railway station in Moston, Manchester, England, is 4 miles (6 km) north of Manchester Victoria on the Caldervale Line managed by Northern.

Moston station opened in February 1872. It is on Hollinwood Avenue, in New Moston, and is unstaffed, the station buildings having been demolished in the late 1990s. Tickets must be purchased on the train.

== Services ==
On Monday to Saturday daytimes, there is now a half-hourly service in operation here once again. Train operator Arriva Rail North (under the brand name Northern) had committed to reinstate the 30-minute frequency as part of its successful 2015 franchise bid. Previous operator Serco-Abellio had cut the off-peak frequency here to hourly in May 2014. Northbound trains now run to Rochdale, where connections are available for stations further afield, and southbound trains run to Manchester Victoria and thence to Bolton, Blackburn and Clitheroe (alternate trains only).

On Sundays, the Southport - Wigan Wallgate - Manchester - Blackburn service calls hourly in each direction.

Preceding station	National Rail	Following station
Manchester Victoria	Northern; Caldervale Line or Todmorden/Rochdale-Kirkby/Wigan Wallgate	Mills Hill
	Historical railways	
Newton Heath; Line open, station closed	Lancashire and Yorkshire Railway	Middleton Junction; Line open, station closed

== Gallery ==
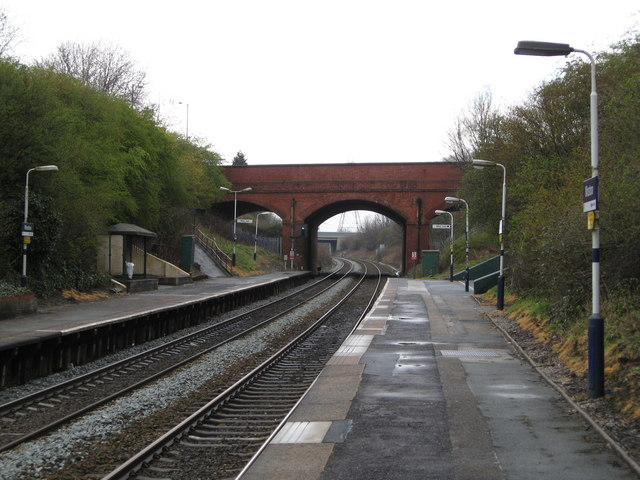
Moston railway station, looking north

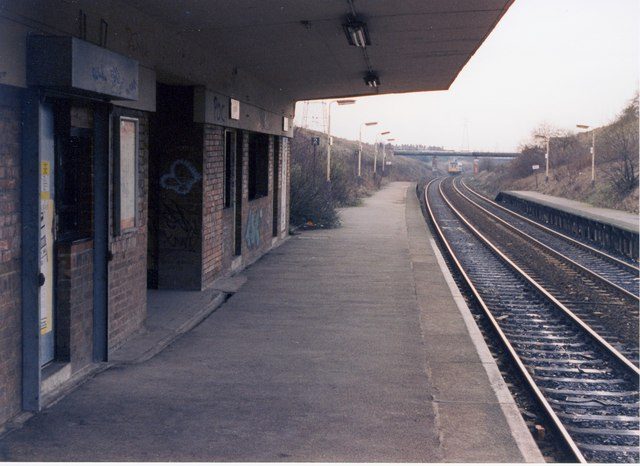
Platform 2, in 1989
