= Broadhurst Park =

Football ground in Manchester, England

Coordinates: 53.5167°N 2.1804°W

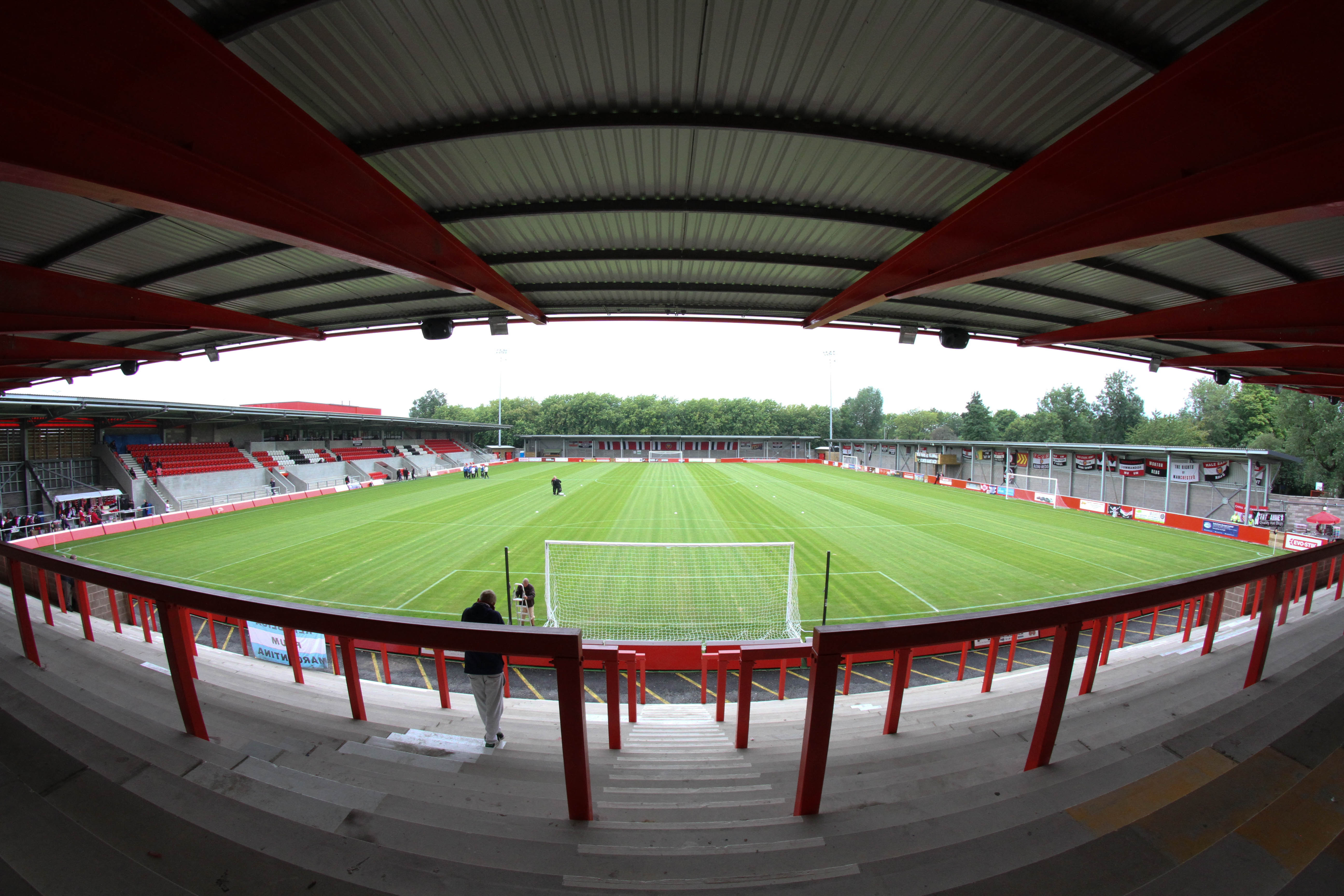
- Broadhurst Park in August 2015
- Former names: Moston Community Stadium
- Location: Lightbowne Road; Moston; Manchester; M40 0FJ
- Owner: F.C. United of Manchester
- Operator: F.C. United of Manchester
- Capacity: 4,900
- Surface: Grass
- Record attendance: 4,232 (vs Benfica B, 29 May 2015)
- Public transit: Moston; Newton Heath and Moston

Construction
- Groundbreaking: 17 November 2013
- Built: November 2013 – May 2015
- Opened: 29 May 2015
- Cost: £6.5 million
- Architects: Taylor Young (now IBI Group)
- Builder: Barnes Construction
- Project manager: Frank Whittle Partnerships
- Structural engineer: Scott Hughes Design

Tenants
- F.C. United of Manchester (2015–present); Moston Juniors F.C. (2015–present); F.C. United of Manchester Women (2018–present)

Broadhurst Park is a football ground in Moston, Manchester, England. It is the home of F.C. United of Manchester and Moston Juniors F.C. The ground was known by its project name, Moston Community Stadium, before being changed at a members' meeting in 2014.

F.C. United formed in 2005, and aimed to construct a ground in Manchester by 2012. After plans for an initial site collapsed, the development of a new ground in Moston was announced. A protracted planning process followed, and construction began in November 2013. Broadhurst Park was completed with a capacity of 4,900 in May 2015. The opening match was a friendly between F.C. United and Benfica B on 29 May 2015. F.C. United played host to Stockport County in their first ever competitive league match at Broadhurst Park on 11 August 2015.

== Background ==
=== F.C. United ===
F.C. United were formed in 2005 by a group of Manchester United supporters following the club's controversial takeover by Malcolm Glazer which led to hundreds of supporters defecting from the club. Without a stadium of their own they agreed to use Bury's Gigg Lane stadium, but the agreement continued at the cost of approximately £5,000 per match. Within a year, the fan-owned club set aspirations to build its own 7,000 to 10,000 capacity stadium as close to Manchester city centre as possible by 2012 and consequently entered into negotiations with New East Manchester and Manchester City Council to develop their plans. Despite attendances averaging over 2,000 in their first few seasons, the fact that the club did not have access to a stadium of its own on its match days was a contributory factor in the club's financial loss for three years (£42,267 in 2007, £40,669 in 2008 and £9,663 in 2009).

F.C. United initially proposed a stadium at Ten Acres Lane in Newton Heath, on the site of an existing leisure centre and Astroturf outdoor football pitch. The plans indicated that these community facilities would have been maintained within the new scheme. Newton Heath is 2.8 miles (4.5 km) east north east of Manchester city centre and has close links to Manchester United, who were formed in the urban area and were originally known as Newton Heath LYR Football Club between 1878 and 1902. However, on 4 March 2011 it was announced that Manchester City Council had backed out of plans to fund the new stadium with grants, despite the fact that the previously agreed £1.5 million was close to being raised by fans, and F.C. United moved to search for other sites. Despite this the Council stated that they were still committed to helping F.C. United build a ground in Manchester and on 5 April 2011 it was announced that, after considering three possible alternative sites, Ronald Johnson Playing Fields in Moston was the preferred location for the stadium to be built according to Manchester City Council.

=== Moston Juniors ===
Moston Juniors is a youth football club, formed in 1993. The club has Active Sports and Charity Club status and was the first club in Manchester to receive FA Charter Standard Community Club status. The club signed the lease for Ronald Johnson Playing fields in 2007, with work to improve the site being completed in 2009 due to a grant from Manchester City Council and the Football Foundation. The club had further plans with the help of a proposed £750,000 council grant to build a clubhouse and upgrade their pitches, however they were unable to secure sufficient additional funding to make the project happen. On announcement of the intended redevelopment of the Ronald Johnson Playing fields into a new stadium, Moston Juniors entered into a partnership with F.C. United and Manchester City Council so that they could lease the new ground facilities.

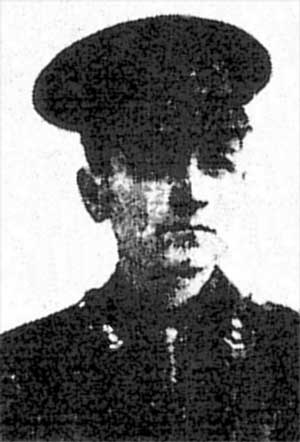
Captain Ronald Lindsay Johnson (1889–1917)

== History prior to construction ==
The surrounding area was part of the manor of Moston, near the now demolished Moston Hall. It was owned by Sir Edward Tootal Broadhurst, a local industrialist, who in 1920 donated 80 acres of the land for use as a park, as a recognition of victory in the First World War.

The ground on which the stadium is built has long been used for sport. The playing fields in Moston were purchased on behalf of the workers of Johnson, Clapham and Morris, a metal working and fabrication business. The fields were named for Ronald Lindsay Johnson (24 September 1889 – 29 May 1917), a member of the Johnson family who died while serving as an Acting Captain and Divisional Trench Mortar Officer (DTMO) in the First World War. As DTMO for the 23rd Division, Johnson was responsible for co-ordinating the targeting and positioning of mortar batteries and it was during preparation for the Battle of Messines that he was mortally wounded on 29 May 1917. He had ascended to chairman of his family business following the deaths of his father in February 1914 and his brother William in July 1916. His will (compiled before Christmas 1916) originally left his shares in the family business in trust for the benefit of the employees of the firm; but when this bequest was deemed to be impractical, the trustees decided instead that eight acres of land should be purchased for the staff as playing fields and a recreation ground. They were opened in the presence of his mother on 17 June 1925.

In April 1934, following the moving of the Richard Johnson, Clapham and Morris Ltd firm to Trafford Park, the playing grounds were offered to the Parks Committee of the Manchester Corporation for £2,400. At the time, the ground was described as being fenced all round with iron railings, containing bowling greens, a number of tennis courts and a cricket pitch, together with two well-built pavilions. For many years the land was used for community events including football and funfairs. A cycle speedway track was built during the 1980s. In 2005, a 2.4 m green powder coated weld mesh fence with gates was erected at the perimeter of the fields. Moston Juniors Football Club secured a lease for the site in 2007, with a view to future development.

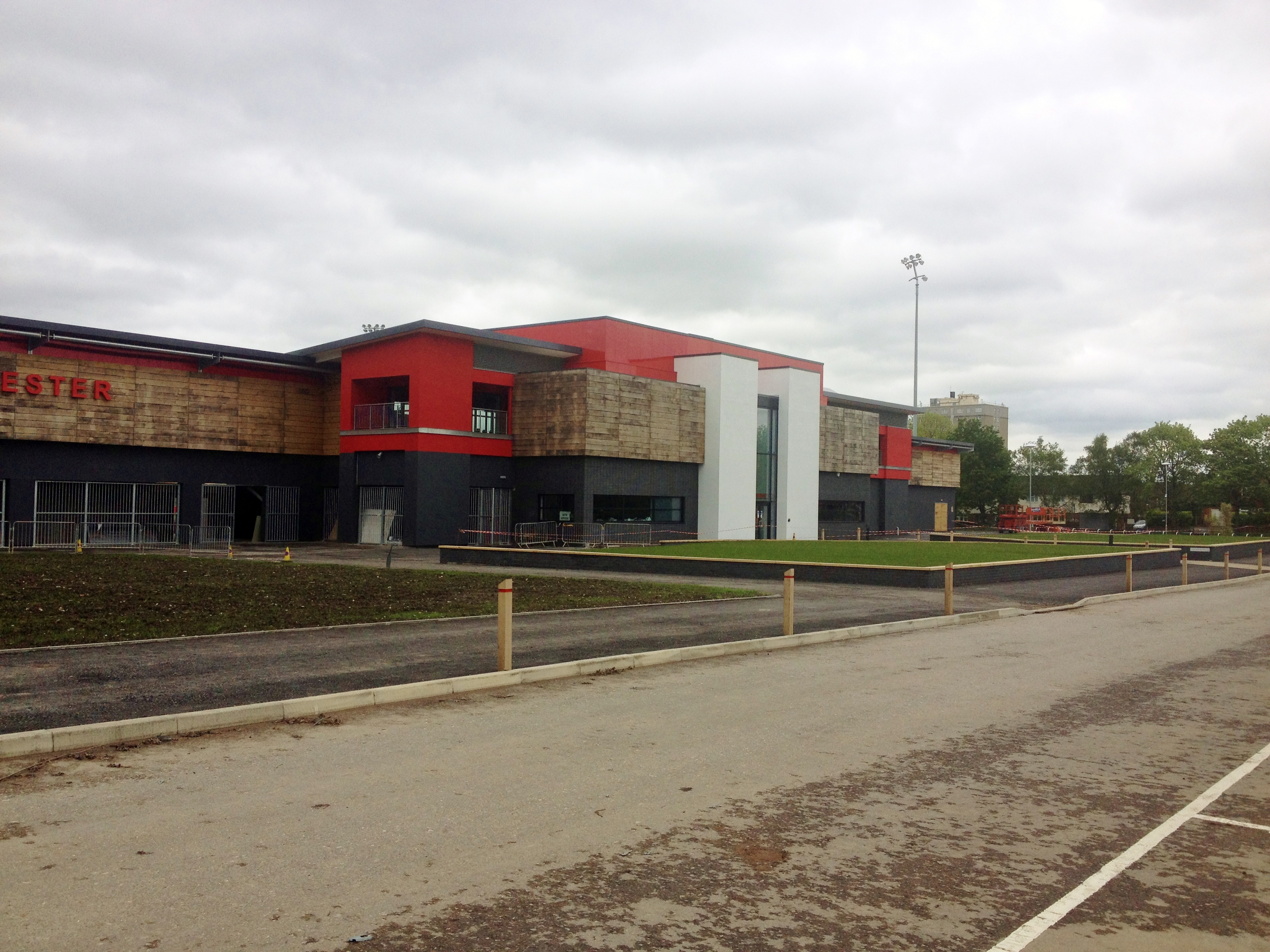
The main entrance of Broadhurst Park.

== Development ==
=== Planning ===
The original plans for the Moston scheme remained similar to the original Ten Acres Lane proposal with a total capacity of 5,000 expected. The plans were developed by architects Taylor Young (now known as IBI Group) and structural engineers Scott Hughes Design.

Some local objections emerged in response to the plans to use of the fields for the stadium. Residents opposed to the stadium were concerned that it would lead to parking problems and devaluation of their property. There were also concerns about the loss of green space. There were also Moston residents who supported the stadium proposals, believing the stadium would provide sports facilities and activities for local children and teenagers, improving the overall health of people in the area. By the end of the consultation process 5,635 letters of support and 2,226 letters of objection were received. – of these 7,653 (97.3%) were "standard letters" with supporters and objectors simply adding a signature. There were also six petitions with 854 names in support and 1,420 names in objection.

In April 2011, the Executive Committee of Manchester City Council approved the proposal to site the ground development subject to a planning application and consultation with residents, local community groups and Moston Juniors F.C. Detailed information about the new facility, including the tentative name Moston Community Stadium, was released on 9 June 2011. A decision by the planning officers from Manchester City Council regarding consent had to be moved from 15 September to 27 October due to the volume of interest in the application. The Head of Planning recommended that the Committee were "Minded to Approve" the planning application subject to a total of 42 attached conditions including the signing of an agreement for the site to have community use, an ongoing travel plan and off-site parking provision. At the planning meeting on 27 October, Manchester City Council approved the planning permission for the new stadium.

=== Judicial review ===
After the planning approval was granted, local residents hired barristers to consider an appeal against the decision. The activation of the planning permission allowed solicitors on behalf of a group called Residents United Residents Association (RURA) to launch its Judicial Review Pre-Action Protocol, which challenged the council's decision making process. One of the original areas for appeal revolved around historic covenants on parts of the land, but the Charities Commission ruled that the fields are not charitable land.

The residents gained legal aid to launch the judicial review and argued that there were flaws in the planning process. The review took place on 18–19 December 2012 in Manchester to decide whether the council's planning process was legal. The judge reserved his decision for a month, but decided to reject RURA's claim to quash the planning permission. The final legal action from RURA came to an end after an unsuccessful challenge was made to the Court of Appeal in March 2013.

=== Funding ===
In total, £6.5 million was required to fund construction of the ground:–

- £2 million – F.C. United Community Shares scheme (target reached on 26 Feb 2015)
- £1 million – from other supporter fundraising, e.g. £467,000 from the F.C. United Development Fund (including £51,000 from crowdfunding) and £345,000 from a Loan Stock scheme
- £918,000 – Sport England (Iconic facilities fund)
- £550,000 – Manchester City Council (approved January 2012)
- £500,000 – Football Foundation Community Facilities Fund
- £500,000 – Manchester City Council loan (approved January 2012)
- £303,000 – Government grant, Community Assets and Services Fund (announced January 2014)
- £150,000 – Football Foundation Football Stadia Improvement Fund
- £90,000 – Viridor Waste Management

=== Construction ===
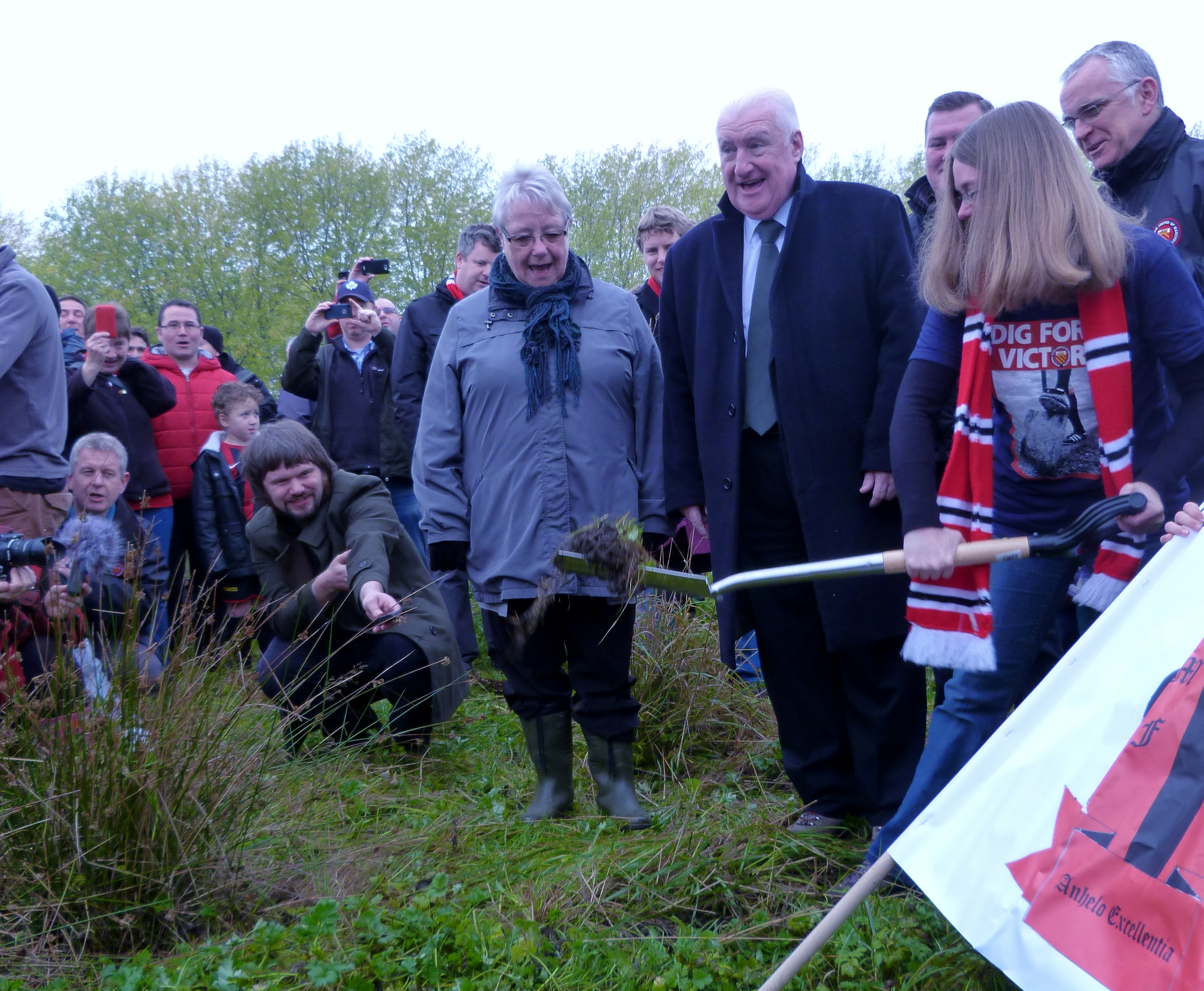
The spade-in-the-ground ceremony at Ronald Johnson Playing Fields, marking the official start of construction

The club signed a Section 106 and lease agreement in July 2012, activating the planning permission which had been granted subject to the 42 conditions recommended by the Head of Planning back in October 2011. Many of these conditions would be routinely applied to applications, such as the ground must be completed within three years (July 2015) and the building matching the submitted drawings. Other conditions include the recommendation that F.C. United not play any home games when Manchester City are also at home, or there being a major event at the City of Manchester Stadium due to the grounds being just over 3 miles apart and the possible impact on traffic and car parking availability within the area. Floodlights on one of the community pitches must be switched off at 8pm, with the other pitches being allowed to operate until 9pm. The club's original target was to open the Ten Acres Lane site in August 2012. However, several delays ensued including the change of site to Moston and a 13-week "cooling off period" after the successful application. The F.C. United board had initially identified a tentative construction start date of May 2012, but the legal challenge to the council's decision delayed this for nearly 18 months until work finally began in November 2013.

The ground was then scheduled to be completed by September 2014 with the work being undertaken by Barnes Construction. The project manager was Frank Whittle Partnerships. The completion target was to be 40 weeks after construction had commenced. The club had hoped to play the 2014–15 season in their own ground. However, some difficulties with the steel and logistics led to delays. The opening was initially moved back to December 2014 but further delays led to F.C. United playing the entire 2014–15 season at Bower Fold in Stalybridge and at Curzon Ashton's Tameside Stadium. Much of the stadium's fittings were constructed by fans and volunteers, while one terrace was recycled from the Drill Field ground in Northwich which had closed in 2002. The facilities were largely completed by April 2015 and a test event was held at the ground on 16 May 2015.

=== Ground naming ===
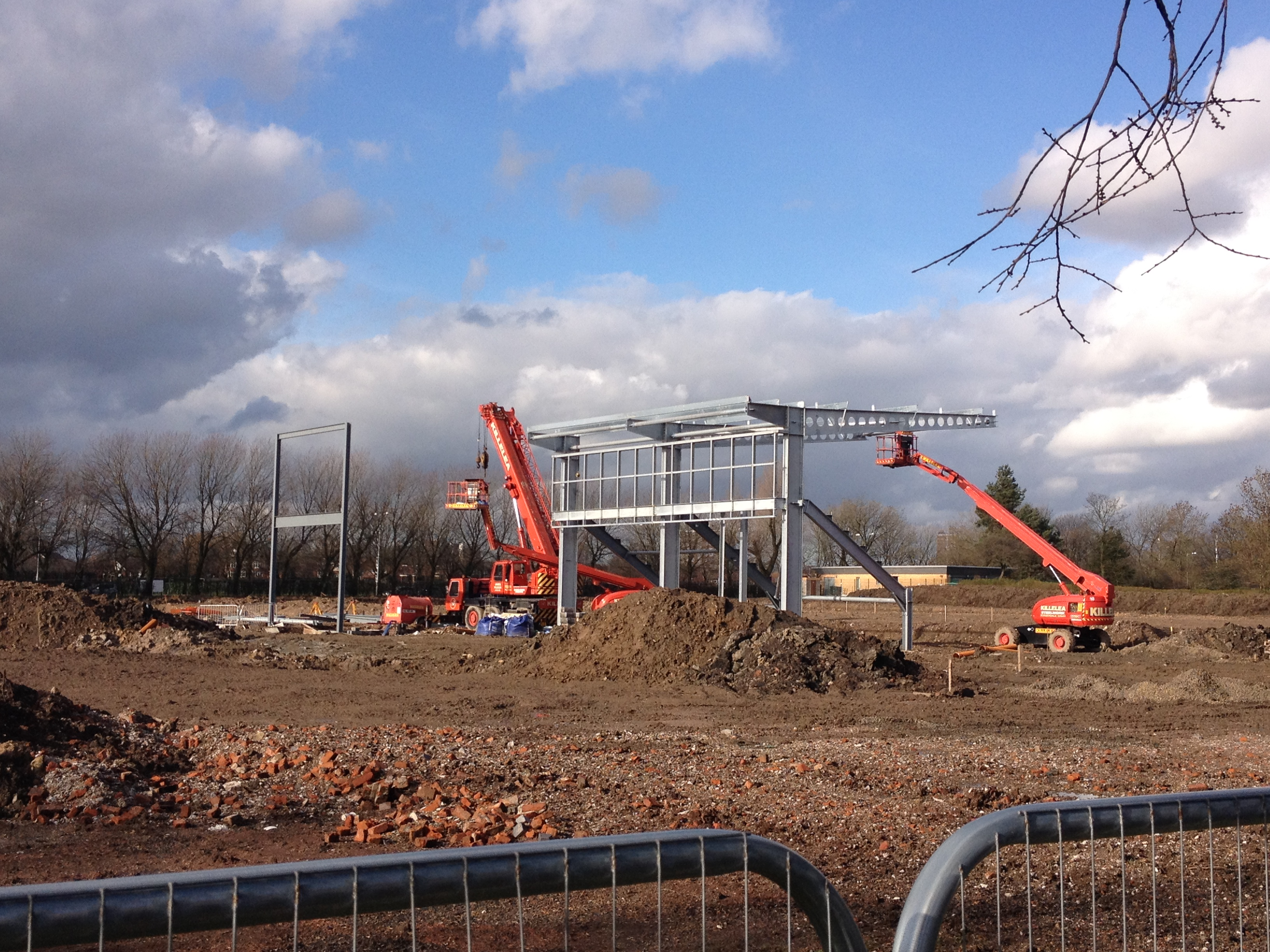
Broadhurst Park under construction in February 2014

The "Moston Community Stadium" was the project name for the ground announced in the summer of 2011. However, the official ground name was chosen by F.C. United members at the club's Annual General Meeting on 10 April 2014. The members were able to propose suggestions and these were reduced to a shortlist of seven.

- Broadhurst
- Broadhurst Park
- FCUM Hall
- Lightbowne Road
- Ronald Johnson Ground
- The Boardwalk
- United of Manchester Stadium

The name was announced as "Broadhurst Park" on 11 April 2014, after a members' vote. The surrounding area has been named for Edward Tootal Broadhurst since he donated land to the people of Moston in 1920.

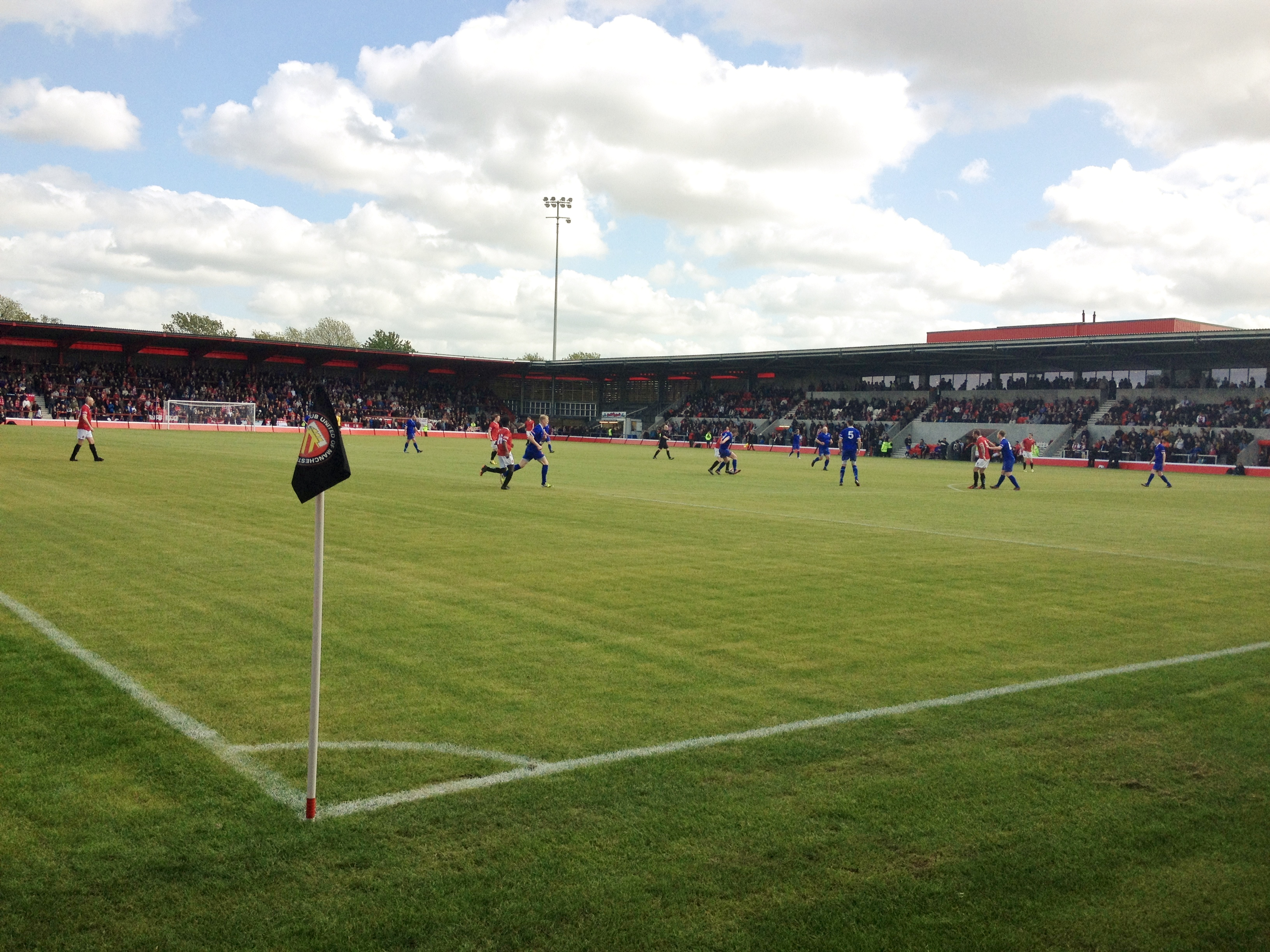
Broadhurst Park's test event between F .C. United's first team (red) and an Invitational XI (blue)

== Opening ==
F.C. United hosted a test event on 16 May 2015, staging a short match between their first team and an Invitational XI made up of past players. This event was organized to test the facilities and prove that the stadium can hold a large capacity crowd, and took place with 3,241 supporters in attendance. The official opening game was a friendly between F.C. United of Manchester and Benfica B on 29 May, the anniversary of Manchester United's victory over Benfica in the 1968 European Cup Final. The date also happened to be the anniversary of the death of Ronald Johnson. Benfica won the opening game 0–1 in front of a capacity crowd of 4,232. The ground's first league game was on 11 August 2015, the second match of the 2015–16 season for F.C. United, in a National League North local derby against Stockport County, a 1–2 loss.

== Average attendances ==
National League North

- 2015–16: 3,395
- 2016–17: 2,668
- 2017–18: 2,109
- 2018–19: 1,941

Northern Premier League Premier Division

- 2019–20: 1,668 (Note: Season abandoned on 26 March 2020 due to the COVID-19 pandemic. Only 15 home fixtures were fulfilled.)
- 2020–21: 581 (Note: Season abandoned on 24 February 2021 due to the COVID-19 pandemic. Attendances were limited to 600 for the 5 fulfilled home fixtures.)
- 2021–22: 1,795
- 2022–23: 1,731
- 2023–24: 1,676
- 2024–25: 1,667

== Facilities ==
The pitch at Broadhurst Park is surrounded on all sides by covered stands: the St. Mary's Road End (east), the North Stand, the Lightbowne Road End (west) and the Main Stand (south), the last of which has seating sections. Spectators enter via twelve turnstiles in the corners of the stadium. The Main Stand contains a clubhouse with a bar and catering facilities, club offices, changing rooms, a medical suite and a classroom. There is an additional bar under the St. Mary's Road End and food, concessions and merchandise areas are located both inside and outside the ground. Broadhurst Park also has a third-generation artificial turf pitch and two grass pitches adjacent to it as well as training and community facilities. The 3G pitch has previously been used for home fixtures by F.C. United's Reserve team (not currently operational) and has also hosted Women's team matches. as well as the Club's youth and academy teams and other users. The ends of the main stand have been constructed with future expansion in mind, specifically with space to trial a safe standing area. The club has a partnership with Pennine Telecom to provide free Wi-Fi to supporters at the ground.

Broadhurst Park has 160 car parking spaces, (a £5.00 charge being levied) and available on a first come – first served basis on 1st team match days. The stadium is also served by Newton Heath and Moston tram stop (tram/light rail), Moston railway station (heavy rail), and several bus routes, including match day special buses from the city's Northern Quarter. 80 bicycle stands have also been installed by the club to encourage cycling to the ground.
