= Bolton Wanderers W.F.C. =

Women's football club from Horwich, England

Bolton Wanderers
- Full name: Bolton Wanderers Women Football Club
- Nicknames: The Trotters; The Wanderers; The Whites
- Short name: BWFC
- Founded: 1983; 43 years ago
- Stadium: The Ginge Power Stadium
- Capacity: 2,000
- Manager: Tom Cunniff
- League: North West Regional Premier Division
- 2025–26: North West Regional Premier Division, 3rd of 11
- Website: bwfc.co.uk
Home colours	Away colours	Third colours

Bolton Wanderers Women Football Club (/ˈboʊltən/ BOHL-tən) is an English women's football club based in Greater Manchester, England. Founded in 1983, they currently play in the North West Regional Premier Division, with home games played at The Ginge Power Stadium, home of Daisy Hill.

== History ==
Bolton Wanderers Women Football Club was formed in 1983. The club previously represented Bolton Wanderers, but parted ways with the club in 2020. However, on 8 March 2024, the club announced that the Women's Team would be fully integrated into club operations with the long-term aim of turning the team semi-professional, taking it from the hands of Community Trust for the start of the 2024/25 season.

Bolton won the 2016–17 North West Regional Premier Division, and were promoted to the FA Women's National League Division One North. In June 2017, Chris Knights was appointed manager, and the club moved to the Kensite Stadium. Bolton enjoyed a period of relative success following promotion, reaching the third round of the 2018–19 FA Cup, losing 2–0 to Cardiff City, and reaching the semi-finals of the 2018–19 FA Women's National League Cup, losing 1–0 to Crawley Wasps.

On 19 August 2022, Jordan Morris and Lee Atkinson were announced as managers. Atkinson later parted ways with the club. Bolton won the 2021–22 Lancashire County Premier Division, and were promoted to the North West Regional Division One North.

Following the integration of the Women's team into club operations for the 2024/25 season, on 19 June 2024, the club announced that Myles Smith would be the new manager with Carl Halliwell as his assistant. The club also confirmed that the team would play its home games at the Skuna Stadium, the home of Atherton Collieries.

On 12 August of the same year, Katie Holt and Charlotte Tyers became the first two footballers to get signed by the club following the takeover. The following season was very successful, with Bolton having an invincible league season in the North West Regional Division One North, gaining promotion as Champions with 20 wins, 2 draws, and 0 defeats, this also carrying into winning the Lancashire FA Women's Challenge Cup. The final match of the season, against Preston North End, also saw the women play at the Toughsheet Community Stadium for the first time in their history.

For the 2025–26 season, they played their home matches at Victory Park, home of Chorley. On 1 October 2025, Bolton confirmed the departure of manager Myles Smith, as well as Assistant Coach Megan Campbell who had been appointed to the position in August 2025. The club announced that assistant coach Tom Cunniff would take charge as interim head coach, and reiterated the club's commitment to its women's side. On 8 November 2025, Cunniff was appointed permanently as Head Coach. They moved to The Ginge Power Stadium for the 2026–27, which is also used by Daisy Hill. Unlike their previous temporary stadiums, this one is in Bolton.

== Players ==
=== Current Squad ===
As of 17 September 2026

Note: Flags indicate national team as defined under FIFA eligibility rules; some limited exceptions apply. Players may hold more than one non-FIFA nationality.

No.	Pos.	Nation	Player
1	GK	ENG	Annabelle White
2	DF	ENG	Molly Philpott
3	DF	ENG	Hannah Baldwin
4	DF	USA	Xio Rodriguez
5	DF	ENG	Katie Holt
6	MF	ENG	Grace Vella
7	FW	ENG	Molly Wood
8	MF	ENG	Poppy Wallis
9	FW	ENG	Ella Tweedle
10	FW	ENG	Sophie Coward
11	FW	ENG	Abbie Brown
12	DF	ENG	Kayleigh McDonald
14	MF	ENG	Faye Stanhope
15	FW	ENG	Emmanuella Cambell

No.	Pos.	Nation	Player
16	DF	ENG	Lucy Walsh (captain)
17	FW	ENG	Naomi Lawrence
18	MF	ENG	Natasha Dale
19	FW	ENG	Grace Osváth
20	DF	ENG	Emily Owens
21	DF	ENG	Summer Breed
22	GK	ENG	Tilda Lester
23	MF	ENG	Lauren Sharples
24	MF	ENG	Milla Hodson
25	MF	ENG	Lizzy Hamer-Brown
28	MF	ENG	Scarlett Dearden
31	DF	ENG	Maddie Leigh
33	DF	ENG	Lily Weston
37	MF	ENG	Katie Robertson

== Current technical staff ==
Bolton Wanderers Women Staff and Management

Job Title	Name
Chairman	(England) Sharon Brittan
Head Coach	(England) Tom Cunniff
Assistant Head Coach	(England) Carl Halliwell
Goalkeeper Coach	(England) Harry Ball
Lead Sports Rehabilitator	(England) Cara Loates
Sports Therapist	(England) Belguy Manzambi (England) Macy Wilkinson
Analyst	(England) Owen Jackson (England) Finlay Openshaw

== Honours ==
League

- North West Regional Premier Division (level 5)
  - Champions: 2016–17
- North West Regional Division One North (level 6)
  - Champions: 2024–25
- Lancashire County Premier Division (level 7)
  - Champions: 2021–22

Cup

- Lancashire FA Women's Challenge Cup
  - Champions: 2024–25
