= Crewe Alexandra Women F.C. =

English women's football club

Crewe Alexandra
- Full name: Crewe Alexandra Ladies Football Club
- Nickname: The Alex
- Short name: CAWFC
- Ground: Crewe Alex In The Community
- Capacity: 600
- Chairman: Ray Walker
- League: North West Women's Regional Football League Premier
- 2022–23: North West Women's Regional Football League Premier, 7th of 11

Crewe Alexandra Women Football Club is an English women's football club that plays in the tier five Premier Division of the North West Women's Regional Football League (NWWRFL), and is associated with Crewe Alexandra F.C. The club currently has its Women's First Team and a FA Girls Emerging Talent Centre which consists of squads from u10-u16 – all of which train at The Alexandra Soccer Centre. The first team play their home games at The Crewe Alex Soccer Centre, on Crewe Road in Shavington, on Sunday afternoons.

== History ==
The original Crewe Ladies joined the North West Women's Regional Football League in 1985 and folded on 14 February 1993 with their season incomplete. Before the 1999–2000 season, Crewe Alexandra Ladies FC were elected into the same league, but on 28 August 2001, after just two seasons in Division two South, they also disbanded.

In 2000–01, a new club called Crewe Vagrants was formed, playing in the West Midlands Regional Football League. They won the Premier Division in 2002–03 with 58 points and moved into the (then) tier three Midland Combination. Success continued with a second championship in 2005–06, the season in which the club became Crewe Alexandra. They spent two seasons in the National League North (tier three), with a highest placing of 4th in 2006–07, before being relegated back to the Midland Combination.

The team's best season in the Women's FA Cup has been a fourth round appearance in 2007–08.

In the Cheshire County Cup, they have been finalists on three occasions and won the trophy once, in 2004–05.

In 2012–13, Crewe Alexandra won the NWWRFL Plate by beating Kendal Ladies 7–1 in the final played at The Pavilions in Runcorn. In the same season, the club also established a development squad, playing in the Cheshire Women's & Youth Football League to enhance the playing squad.

Crewe Alexandra were NWWRFL Premier League champions in 2015–2016, and twice won the Cheshire FA Ladies Cup. They then reached a third consecutive final in the 2017–2018 competition, and beat Tranmere Rovers 2–0 to win a third successive title.

Currently (2025–26 season), Crewe Alexandra play in the NWWRFL Premier Division (tier five).

=== Notable players ===
The club's best known player is Kerry Davis, a prolific striker who scored a then record 44 goals in 82 appearances for England (1982–1998). She was inducted into the English Football Hall of Fame in 2022 and into the Stoke-on-Trent Sporting Hall of Fame in 2024. Her England goal-scoring record was beaten in February 2012, when Kelly Smith scored her 45th goal while playing against Finland in the Cyprus Cup. Other notable players include:

- Una Harkin
- Emily Hollinshead (youth player)
- Millie Turner (youth player)

== Staff ==
Chairman: Ray Walker

Treasurer / Club Captain: Jess Sheridan

Secretary: Melvin Bates

Club Welfare Officer: Melvin Bates

First Team Manager: Matt Fisher

First Team Assistant Manager: Jason Glennerster

First Team Coaches:

First Team Goalkeeper Coach: Toby Rimmer

FA Girls Emerging Talent Centre Manager: Matt Fisher

Under 16 ETC Head Coach: Matt Fisher

Under 14 ETC Head Coach: Callum Bailey

Under 12 ETC Head Coach: Ryan Miles

Under 10 ETC Head Coach: Jason Glennerster
