= Preston North End Women F.C. =

Women's Association football club in Preston, England

Preston North End Women
- Full name: Preston North End Women's Football Club
- Nickname: The Lilywhites
- Short name: PNEWFC
- Ground: Inglewhite Road
- Capacity: 1,000
- Manager: Mark Steele
- League: North West Women's Premier League
- Website: pnefc.net
Home colours	Away colours	Third colours

Preston North End Women's Football Club, commonly referred to as Preston Women, North End Women, Preston Ladies or PNEWFC, is a professional women's association football club in Preston, Lancashire, England. They currently play in the North West Women's Premier League, the fifth level of the English women's football league system.

== History ==
=== Current Women's Team ===
In 1926, Alfred Frankland had a falling-out with the Dick, Kerr Ladies ownership. The team's name changed to "Preston Ladies F.C." and carried on playing until 1965.

The team reformed in 1992 where they played in North West Women's Regional League Division One North. The team gained promotion in 2005 to the North West Women’s Premier Division.

After over a decade in the North West Women's Premier Division, Preston North End Ladies were relegated back to the North West Women's Regional League Division One at the end of 2015/2016 season..

In 2025/2026, Preston North End Women lifted the North West Women's Regional League Division One North trophy, winning 13 of their 16 league games.

=== Preston North End Women Development squad ===
The Preston North End Women Development Squad won the North West Women's Regional League Division One title.

=== Supporter's Club ===
In 1970, the PNE Supporters Club Ladies was formed, going on to win many different titles and cups.

=== AFC Fylde Women F.C. ===
This club was formed under the name Duke of York in 1971, as founder members of the North West Women's League. They were renamed Preston Rangers W.F.C. in 1977 and reached the semi-finals of the FA Women's Cup in 1982–83 and 1989–90.

In 1997, they became Preston North End W.F.C. and finished 1997–98 as champions, winning promotion to the Northern Combination Women's Football League. In 1999, the club was officially affiliated with Preston North End F.C. The club won the Northern Combination Women's Football League in 2005–06 and were promoted into the FA Women's Premier League Northern Division for the first time. In June 2011, Luke Swindlehurst was appointed first team manager, following his previous role as assistant manager in the 2010–11 season.

The club was rebranded Fylde Ladies F.C. in May 2016 after switching its affiliation from Preston North End to AFC Fylde.

== Grounds ==
As of August 2024, Preston North End Women have played their home games as Longrdige Town's ground Inglewhite Road. Although on occasion, they have played at Deepdale.

== Technical staff ==
Below is a list of non-playing personnel:

Name	Role	Note
Mark Steele	First Team manager
Cameron Molloy	First Team coach
Logan De Klerk	First Team coach

== Players ==
As of 11 November 2026

=== Current squad ===
Note: Flags indicate national team as defined under FIFA eligibility rules; some limited exceptions apply. Players may hold more than one non-FIFA nationality.

No.	Pos.	Nation	Player
1	GK	ENG	Emily Gibbins
2	DF	ENG	Menna Shirras
3	DF	ENG	Emma Tunstall
5	DF	ENG	Kerry Mahon
6	MF	ENG	Ella Finch
7	MF	ENG	Charlotte Tyers
9	FW	ENG	Maddie Hadley
10	MF	ENG	Katie Woodhead
11	FW	ENG	Grace Flinn
12	DF	ENG	Caitlin McNicholl

No.	Pos.	Nation	Player
14	DF	ENG	Abbie Jones
15	DF	ENG	Lisa Topping
16	MF	ENG	Samantha Ball
18	FW	ENG	Alicia Scott
19	MF	ENG	Lucy Stevens
20	FW	ENG	Zea Anderson
21	GK	ENG	Maddie Schultz
22	MF	ENG	Ella Green (on loan from AFC Fylde)
27	MF	ENG	Laura Walker (captain)

== Men's football ==
Preston North End Women's Football Club is affiliated with Preston North End FC, a founding member of the Football League and inaugural winner of the league championship.
