= North West Women's Regional Football League =

English regional football league

- Founded: 1989
- Country: England
- Divisions: 3
- Number of clubs: 35
- Level on pyramid: 5–6
- Promotion to: FA Women's National League Division One North
- Relegation to: Cheshire Women's & Youth Football League; Greater Manchester Women's Football League; Lancashire FA Women's County League; Liverpool Women's & Youth Football League.
- Website: The FA – NWWRFL

The North West Women's Regional Football League (NWWRFL) is one of the eight English regional leagues comprising the fifth and sixth tiers of the English women's football pyramid. The other seven leagues are the North East, East Midlands, West Midlands, Eastern, London and South East, South West and Southern. The NWWRFL includes teams from several counties in the north west of England. Broadly, these are Cumbria, Lancashire, Greater Manchester, Merseyside, Cheshire, Shropshire and Staffordshire.

The league has two levels: the tier five Premier Division and, split geographically, the tier six Division One North and Division One South. The Premier Division has promotion to the FA Women's National League Division One (tier four). Division One North and Division One South have relegation into four county leagues (all tier seven): Cheshire Women's & Youth Football League Premier Division; Greater Manchester Women's Football League Premier Division; Lancashire FA Women's County League Division One; and Liverpool Women's & Youth Football League Division One.

== History ==
The league was founded in 1989, with the merger of the Greater Manchester and Merseyside League, the North West Women's League, and the Three Counties League. On formation, it had 42 teams, spread over four divisions.

The former Women's Football Association (WFA) was established in 1969, independently of the FA. While progress was made at the national and international levels, grassroots development was hindered by a lack of funding and, by 1993, there were only 80 girls' teams nationwide, including some in Lancashire, Liverpool and Manchester. In 1993, the WFA disbanded as governance of women's football was accepted by the FA. Among the FA's priorities were, as in men's football, to develop a pyramid system of leagues throughout the country and to establish regional governance by county associations. These include the Lancashire County Football Association which, in 1996, established the Lancashire FA Women's County League, originally known as the Lancashire FA Girls League.

As the number of teams and local leagues grew, the women's pyramid was restructured and the North West Women's Regional Football League was formally reconstituted in 2003. Growth was boosted by affiliation of women's teams to professional clubs – for example, when the NWWRFL began in 2003–04, the Premier Division included teams affiliated to Bury, Bolton Wanderers and Preston North End, all members of the Football League. Originally, the NWWRFL had four levels – a Premier Division and three lower levels called Divisions One, Two and Three – with promotion and relegation in between. The Premier Division had promotion into the former Northern Combination Women's Football League. The league's inaugural season was 2003–04 when the Premier Division champions were Preston North End WFC, who were unbeaten in their 17 matches. There were ten founder members of the Premier Division: AFC Darwen Ladies, Bolton Wanderers Ladies, Bury FC Women, Chorley Women FC, Hopwood Ladies, Liverpool Feds, Preston North End WFC, Stretford Victoria, Warrington Town Ladies and Witton Albion Ladies.

In 2005, the NWWRFL's structure was changed from four levels to two by the combination of the old Divisions One, Two and Three into Division One North and Division One South, which are both in level six of the pyramid and split geographically. During the 2000s, there was a further reorganisation of women's football at the county level and, in addition to the tier seven Lancashire League, others were established in Cheshire, Greater Manchester, and Merseyside. The top divisions of these four leagues have been promoted to NWWRFL Divisions One North and One South. The Premier Division was unchanged in 2005 and is now a level five league with promotion into the level four FA Women's National League Division One. It is one of eight level five leagues nationally, the others being the North East, East Midlands, West Midlands, Eastern, London and South East, South West and Southern.

The NWWRFL's first season as a two-level structure was 2005–06 in which the Premier Division champions were Stretford Victoria. The first winners of Division One North and South were Saint Domingo's (based in Huyton, Liverpool) and AFC Urmston Meadowside (based in Davyhulme, Manchester) respectively.

The league's 2019–20 season was cancelled due to the COVID-19 pandemic and all matches were declared null and void. The 2020–21 season began but, after more COVID-related disruption, it was curtailed on 16 March 2021 with no titles, promotions or relegations. For the 2021–22 season, the league has been enlarged from 30 to 34 clubs as both Division One North and South now have twelve members.

== Current clubs (2026–27) ==
=== Premier Division ===
Club	Home ground
Bolton Wanderers Women	The Ginge Power Stadium, Daisy Hill
Bury Women	Gigg Lane, Bury
Crewe Alexandra Women	Alexandra Soccer Centre, Crewe
Darwen FC Women	Anchor Road, Darwen
St Helens Women	Windleshaw Sports, St Helens
FC United of Manchester Women	Broadhurst Park, Moston
Mancunian Unity Women	Emplas Commercial North Stadium, Oldham
Nantwich FC Women	Swansaway Stadium, Nantwich
Poulton Vics Ladies	Clayton Lane, Poulton
Preston North End Women	Inglewhite Road, Longridge
Tranmere Rovers Women	Ellesmere Port Sports Village, Ellesmere Port
West Didsbury & Chorlton Women	Step Places Stadium, Chorlton-cum-Hardy

=== Division One ===
Division One North

Club	Home ground
Accrington Stanley Women	Accrington and Rossendale College, Accrington
Blackburn Community Sports Club	Lammack Road, Blackburn
Blackpool FC Girls	Mechanics Ground, Blackpool
Bolton Wanderers Girls	Eddie Davies Academy, Lostock
Fleetwood Town Wrens Ladies	Poolfoot Farm, Thornton-Cleveleys
Haslingden Ladies & Girls	Alder Grange School, Rossendale
Morecambe	Trimpell Sports & Social Club, Morecambe
Penrith Ladies	Frenchfield Park, Penrith
Wigan Athletic Women	Edge Hall Road, Orrell
Workington Town Women	Derwent Park, Workington

Division One Central

Club	Home ground
Altrincham FC Women	Partington Sports Village, Partington
Atherton Laburnum Rovers Ladies	Crilly Park, Atherton
Bury Women Reserves	Gigg Lane, Bury
Rochdale Women	Kingsway Park High School, Rochdale
Salford City Lionesses	Broughton Playing Fields, Salford
Stockport County Womens Development	Park Road Stadium, Cheadle
Wigan Athletic Ladies	Brocstedes Park, Ashton-in-Makerfield
Wythenshawe Town Women	Ericstan Park, Wythenshawe

Division One South

Club	Home ground
Chester Women	Deva Stadium, Chester
Mossley Hill Athletic Women	Mossley Hill Athletic Club, Mossley Hill
Runcorn Linnets Ladies	APEC Taxis Stadium, Runcorn
Tranmere Rovers Women Development	Shaftesbury Youth Club, Southport
Warrington Town Women	Great Sankey Neighbourhood Hub, Great Sankey
West Didsbury & Chorlton Women’s Reserves	Chorlton Sports & Social Club, Chorlton-cum-Hardy
Wirral Phoenix Women	Pensby High School, Pensby
Wirral United Women	Leasowe Leisure Centre, Wirral
MSB Woolton Women	Simpsons Football Ground, Woolton

== Champions ==
The league began in the 2003–04 season with four divisions which were reduced to two before the 2005–06 season. Since then, the structure has been a Premier Division (tier five) and a Division One (tier six) which is itself geographically partitioned into North and South sub-divisions. Some of the teams listed below were short-lived and are now defunct.

Season	Premier Division	Division One	Division Two	Division Three
2003–04	Preston North End WFC	Rochdale AFC Ladies	Windscale	Burnley FC Girls & Ladies
2004–05	Garswood Saints	Bury FC Women	Burnley FC Girls & Ladies	Buxton

Season	Premier Division	Division One North	Division One South
2005–06	Stretford Victoria	Saint Domingo's	AFC Urmston Meadowside
2006–07	Rochdale AFC Ladies	Mossley Hill Athletic Ladies	Airbus UK
2007–08	Blackpool Wren Rovers Ladies	Leigh RMI	Fletcher Moss Rangers Ladies
2008–09	Liverpool Feds	Chorley Women FC	AFC Urmston Meadowside
2009–10	Mossley Hill Athletic Ladies	Wigan Athletic Ladies & Girls	Denton Town Ladies
2010–11	Fletcher Moss Rangers Ladies	Blackpool FC Ladies	Northwich Vixens
2011–12	Chorley Women FC	Morecambe Ladies Reserves	City of Manchester
2012–13	Tranmere Rovers Ladies	Blackpool Wren Rovers Ladies	Chester City Ladies
2013–14	Morecambe Ladies Reserves	Blackburn Community Sports Club Ladies	Birkenhead
2014–15	Blackpool Wren Rovers Ladies	Accrington Sports and Football Club	Manchester Stingers
2015–16	Crewe Alexandra Ladies	Preston North End Women's FC	MSB Woolton Ladies
2016–17	Bolton Wanderers Women	Sir Tom Finney FC Ladies	Merseyrail Bootle
2017–18	Burnley FC Girls & Ladies	Penrith AFC Ladies	FC United of Manchester
2018–19	Stockport County Ladies	Bury FC Women	West Didsbury & Chorlton Women
2019–20	season cancelled due to COVID-19 pandemic – all matches declared null and void		
2020–21	season curtailed on 16 March 2021 – no titles, promotion or relegation below tier two		
2021–22	Merseyrail	Blackburn Community Sports Club Ladies	Curzon Ashton
2022–23	F.C. United of Manchester	Blackpool	Bury
2023–24	Cheadle Town Stingers	Mancunian Unity	Wythenshawe
2024–25	Wythenshawe	Bolton Wanderers Women	Poulton Vics Ladies
