= 2014–15 Women's FA Cup =

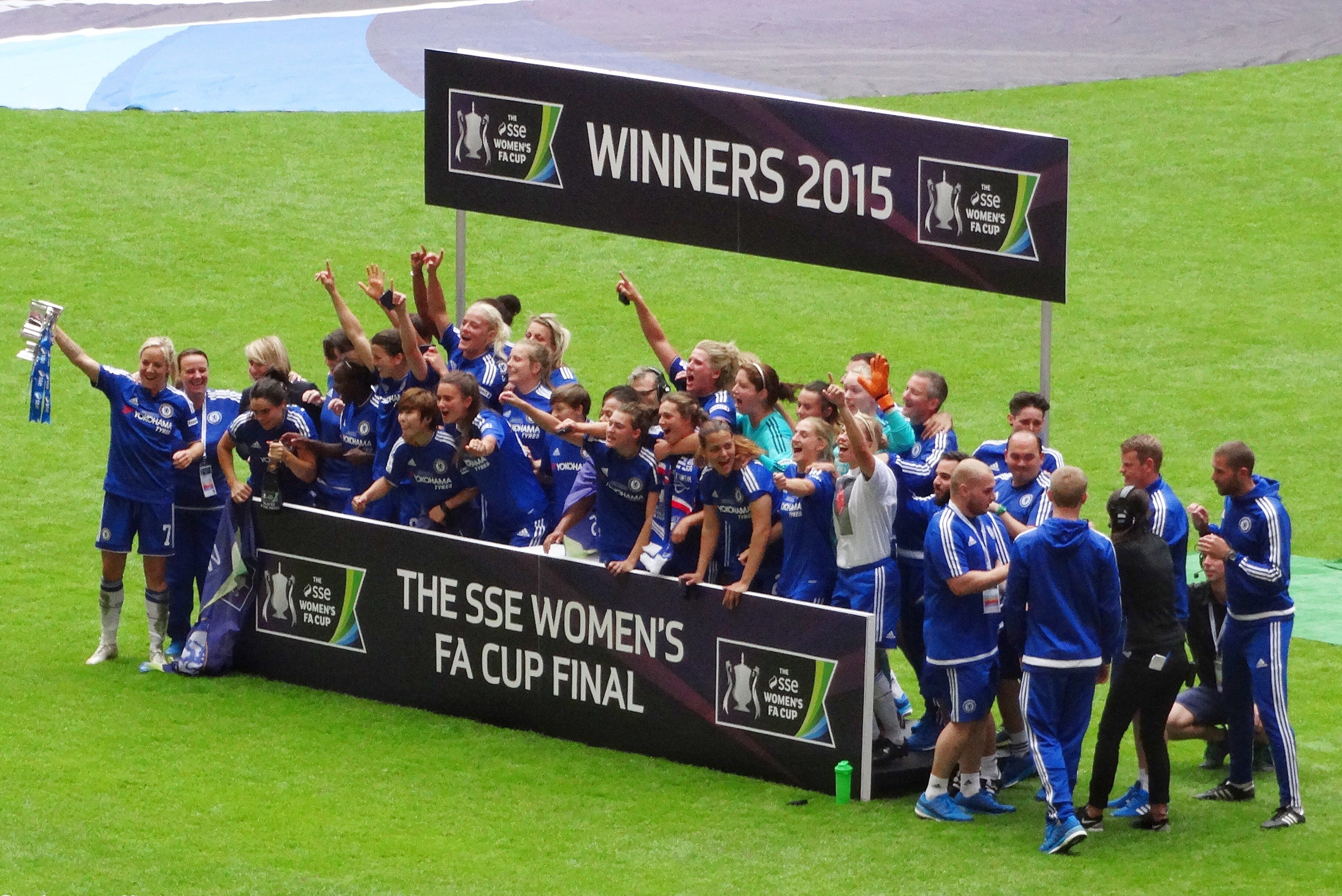

Tournament details
- Country: England; Wales
- Teams: 257

Final positions
- Champions: Chelsea (1st title)
- Runners-up: Notts County

Tournament statistics
- Matches played: 251
- Goals scored: 1,260 (5.02 per match)

The 2014–15 Women's FA Cup was the 45th staging of the FA Women's Cup, a knockout cup competition for women's football teams in England. Arsenal were the defending champions, having beaten Everton 2–0 in the previous final, but lost in the quarter-finals to Chelsea. The 2015 Final took place at Wembley Stadium for the first time, and was held on 1 August 2015. The match was televised live on BBC One.

The competition was rebranded as the Women's FA Cup, following a sponsor deal with SSE. For sponsorship purposes, it was named the SSE Women's FA Cup.

== Teams ==
A total of 257 teams entered the 2014–15 FA Women's Cup, with the level of league football played by each team determining the stage of the competition where they were inserted. Teams which played in WSL1, the highest level of league football for women in England, entered in the fifth round.

Round	Previous round winners	Entered at this stage	Total teams competing	Games played	Goals scored
Preliminary round	–	64	64	31	181
First round qualifying	32	108	140	69	415
Second round qualifying	70	–	70	34	136
Third round qualifying	35	41	76	37	199
First round	38	2	40	20	69
Second round	20	24	44	21	106
Third round	22	10	32	16	70
Fourth round	16	–	16	8	31
Fifth round	8	8	16	8	33
Sixth round	8	–	8	4	15
Semi-finals	4	–	4	2	4
Final	2	–	2	1	1

The preliminary round, first, second and third qualifying rounds, and the second round proper each saw one tie cancelled due to the withdrawal or disqualification of one of the teams.

== Prize fund ==
Round	Prize money
Preliminary round	£125
First round qualifying	£150
Second round qualifying	£200
Third round qualifying	£225
First round	£250
Second round	£300
Third round	£400
Fourth round	£500
Fifth round	£600
Sixth round	£1,000
Semi-finals	£2,000
Final	Winner: £5,000; Runner-up: £2,000

== Preliminary round ==
64 teams entered this stage, with the matches being played on 7 September 2014 and the winners receiving £125. The draw was made on 29 August 2014.

Tie	Home team (tier)	Score	Away team (tier)	Att.
1	Rutherford	4–1	**Prudhoe Town**	
Tie awarded to Prudhoe Town, Rutherford removed from competition
2	Lowick United	6–7 (a.e.t.)	**Blyth Town Lions**	
3	Birtley St Joseph	2–7	**Tynedale**	
4	**Brighouse Town**	10–1	Keighley Oaks	
5	Wakefield	3–5	**Malet Lambert**	
6	Carlisle United	2–3	**CMB**	
7	Rise Park	1–5	**Long Eaton United**	
8	**Nettleham**	13–0	Arnold Town	
9	**Oadby & Wigston**	2–1	Dronfield Town	
10	Coventrians	0–4	**The New Saints**	
11	March Town United	1–7	**Roade**	
12	**Raunds Town**	4–2 (a.e.t.)	Kettering Town	
13	Sandy	0–1	**Rothwell Corinthians**	
14	AFC Sudbury	1–12	**Lowestoft Town**	
15	**Colchester Town**	H–W	Takeley	
Tie awarded to Colchester Town. Takeley withdrew from competition.
16	Bury Town	1–1 (3–4 p)	**Brentwood Town**	

Tie	Home team (tier)	Score	Away team (tier)	Att.
17	**Sawbridgeworth Town**	1–0	Stevenage	
18	KIKK United	2–3	**Barking**	
19	Chesham United	0–8	**Actonians**	
20	**Leverstock Green**	6–0	Headington	
21	**London Corinthians**	12–1	South Park	
22	**Burgess Hill Town**	4–2	Abbey Rangers	
23	Surrey Eagles	1–2	**Battersea & Wandsworth**	
24	Regents Park Rangers	0–5	**Carshalton Athletic**	
25	Hassocks	0–1	**Eastbourne**	
26	**Poole Town**	4–0	Aldershot Town	
27	Southampton	2–3	**Fleet Town**	
28	Brislington	0–2	**Downend Flyers**	
29	Bristol Ladies Union	0–1	**Truro City**	
30	Wootton Bassett Town	2–4	**Ilminster Town**	
31	**Frome Town**	2–0	Cheltenham Civil Service	
32	**Bridgwater Town**	6–0	Launceston	

N.B. the team progressing to the next round is shown in bold.

== First round qualifying ==
The draw was made on 29 August 2014.

Tie	Home team (tier)	Score	Away team (tier)	Att.
1	Kader	0–6	York City	
2	Tynedale	12–0	Forest Hall	
3	Peterlee RA	4–2	Prudhoe Town	
4	Birtley Town	4–2	Middlesbrough Lionesses	
5	Boldon	4–3	Blyth Town Lions	
6	Whitley Bay	6–0	Ashington Woodhorn Lane	
7	Ossett Albion	3–8 (a.e.t.)	Wetherby Athletic	
8	Malet Lambert	0–3	Farsley	
9	Sheffield Wednesday	4–1	Handsworth	
10	Brighouse Athletic	0–2	Brighouse Town	
11	Hull City	12–0	Bradford Park Avenue	
12	Woolton	2–1	Middleton Athletic	
13	Blackpool Wren Rovers	10–1	CMB Ladies	
14	Bury Girls & Ladies	2–8	Burnley	
15	Merseyrail Bootle	10–0	Chester City	
16	Mersey Girls	2–1	Workington Reds	
17	Blackpool	2–3 (a.e.t.)	Penrith	
18	City of Manchester	4–8	Accrington Girls & Ladies	
19	Crewe Alexandra	5–2	Birkenhead	
20	Ruddington Village	6–5	Oadby & Wigston	
21	Sandiacre Town	0–5	Nettleham	
22	West Bridgford	0–3	Long Eaton United	
23	Teversal	0–7	Ellistown	
24	Walsall	3–0	Malvern Town	
25	Leamington Lions	1–3	The New Saints	
26	Allscott	5–4 (a.e.t.)	Lye Town	
27	Stone Dominoes	3–4	Bilbrook	
28	Brereton Town	2–3	Crusaders	
29	Kenilworth Town	1–0	Coventry Development Ladies	
30	Wyrley	2–2 (3–2 p)	Folly Lane	
31	Burton Albion	10–1	Bedworth United	
32	Newmarket Town	0–2	Wymondham Town	
33	Rothwell Corinthians	0–3	Peterborough Northern Star	
34	Great Shelford	7–3	Roade	
35	Bar Hill	4–0	Huntingdon Town	
36	Fulbourn Institute	2–4	Raunds Town	
37	Stewarts & Lloyds Corby	1–2	Burton Park Wanderers	

Tie	Home team (tier)	Score	Away team (tier)	Att.
38	Brentwood Town	2–1	West Billericay	
39	Southendian	2–3	Colchester Town	
40	Lowestoft Town	8–3	Billericay Town	
41	Haringey Borough	2–4	Long Lane	
42	Barking	5–1	Sherrardswood	
43	Garston	1–3	Colney Heath	
44	Royston Town	4–0	Sawbridgeworth Town	
45	Offley & Stopsley	6–0	Harvesters	
46	Banbury United	0–3	Oxford City	
47	Woodley United	1–3	Actonians	
48	Brentford	9–2	Hemel Hempstead Town	
49	Wealdstone	3–2	AFC Dunstable Ladies	
50	Colne Valley	1–6	Maidenhead United	
51	Newbury	1–0	Ascot United	
52	Kidlington	5–3	Marlow	
53	Leighton United Vixens	2–0	Leverstock Green	
54	Bexhill United	0–2	Carshalton Athletic	
55	AFC Wimbledon	4–7	Fulham	
56	London Corinthians	6–0	Eastbourne	
57	Crawley Wasps	9–0	Worthing Town	
58	AFC Wimbledon Development	3–0	Rottingdean Village	
59	Parkwood Rangers	2–1	Aylesford	
60	Dartford Royals	6–0	Chertsey Town	
61	Maidstone United	H–W	Battersea & Wandsworth	
Tie awarded to Maidstone United. Battersea & Wandsworth failed to fulfil fixture.
62	Herne Bay	3–1	Anchorians	
63	Eastbourne Town	7–0	Burgess Hill Town	
64	Parley Sports	10–3	New Forest	
65	Christchurch	2–1	Fleet Town	
66	Poole Town	4–3 (a.e.t.)	Basingstoke Town	
67	Torquay United	5–1	Ilminster Town	
68	Frome Town	2–4	Truro City	
69	Swindon Spitfires	2–1 (a.e.t.)	Downend Flyers	
70	Pen Mill	0–5	Bridgwater Town	

== Second round qualifying ==
Tie	Home team (tier)	Score	Away team (tier)	Att.
1	Boldon	1–2	Peterlee RA	
2	Birtley Town	0–5	Tynedale	
3	York City	0–1	Whitley Bay	
4	Blackpool Wren Rovers	3–0	Merseyrail Bootle	
5	Accrington Girls & Ladies	5–3	Wetherby Athletic	
6	Hull City	2–0	Brighouse Town	
7	Farsley	1–3	Sheffield Wednesday	
8	Woolton	1–0	Penrith	
9	Burnley	2–1	Mersey Girls	
10	Crewe Alexandra	3–1	Nettleham	
11	The New Saints	3–1	Walsall	
12	Ellistown	4–3 (a.e.t.)	Wyrley	
13	Raunds Town	0–2	Crusaders	
14	Allscott	0–1	Burton Albion	
15	Bilbrook	3–0	Kenilworth Town	
16	Long Eaton United	1–5	Ruddington Village	
17	Wymondham Town	2–0	Great Shelford	
18	Colchester Town	2–0	Brentwood Town	
19	Burton Park Wanderers	4–1	Offley & Stopsley	
20	Leighton United Vixens	4–1	Colney Heath	
21	Lowestoft Town	8–0	Wealdstone	
22	Barking	4–0 (a.e.t.)	Royston Town	

Tie	Home team (tier)	Score	Away team (tier)	Att.
23	Peterborough Northern Star	1–2	Bar Hill	
Tie replayed after original result (2–1 to Bar Hill) was declared void.
23 (Replay)	Peterborough Northern Star	2–0 (a.e.t.)	Bar Hill	
24	Long Lane	5–4	Brentford	
25	London Corinthians	3–2	Fulham	
26	Carshalton Athletic	5–2	Maidstone United	
27	Eastbourne Town	3–1	Parkwood Rangers	
28	Crawley Wasps	0–1	Herne Bay	
29	AFC Wimbledon Development	3–0	Dartford Royals	
30	Maidenhead United	2–2 (3–2 p)	Actonians	
31	Poole Town	1–2 (a.e.t.)	Oxford City	
32	Christchurch	1–4	Parley Sports	
33	Bridgwater Town	4–2	Newbury	
34	Torquay United	H–W	Kidlington	
Tie awarded to Torquay United after Kidlington withdrew from competition.
35	Truro City	1–3	Swindon Spitfires	

== Third round qualifying ==
45 clubs belonging to the Women's Premier League division one's Midlands, North, South and South West leagues entered at this stage of the competition.

Tie	Home team (tier)	Score	Away team (tier)	Att.
1	Morecambe	4–3 (a.e.t.)	Burnley	
2	Steel City Wanderers	3–4	Mossley Hill	
3	Hull City	4–1	Chester-le-Street Town	
4	Whitley Bay	1–2	Liverpool Marshall Feds	
5	Guiseley Vixens	H–W	Peterlee RA	
Tie awarded to Guiseley. Peterlee unable to fulfil fixture.
6	Chorley	10–1	Tynedale	
7	Sheffield United Community	2–0	Woolton	
8	Leeds	2–0	Tranmere Rovers	
9	Stockport County	4–0	Accrington Girls & Ladies	
10	Curzon Ashton	2–6	Norton & Stockton Ancients	
11	Blackpool Wren Rovers	6–2	Middlesbrough	
12	Rotherham United	8–0	Sheffield Wednesday	
13	Ruddington Village	2–13	Loughborough Foxes	
14	The New Saints	2–0	Leafield Athletic	
15	Crewe Alexandra	3–5	Loughborough Students	
16	Burton Park Wanderers	0–1 (a.e.t.)	Leicester City Ladies	
17	FC Reedswood	4–0	Burton Albion	
18	Leicester City	7–0	Crusaders	

Tie	Home team (tier)	Score	Away team (tier)	Att.
19	Radcliffe Olympic	5–0	Ellistown	
20	Mansfield Town	2–1	Billbrook	
21	C&K Basildon	3–1	Barking	
22	Norwich City	1–5	Lowestoft Town	
23	Ipswich Town	2–1	Colchester Town	
24	Peterborough Northern Star	1–2	Milton Keynes Dons	
25	Wymondham Town	1–4 (a.e.t.)	Cambridge United	
26	Leighton United Vixens	1–6	Luton Town	
27	Crystal Palace	3–1 (a.e.t.)	AFC Wimbledon Development	
28	Long Lane	0–4	Herne Bay	
29	Enfield Town	3–3 (0–3 p)	Carshalton Athletic	
30	Maidenhead United	3–0	Shanklin	
31	London Corinthians	4–0	Denham United	
32	Eastbourne Town	5–0	Gosport Borough	
33	Forest Green Rovers	10–1	Oxford City	
34	Larkhall Athletic	5–0	Bridgwater Town	
35	Cheltenham Town	2–1	St. Nicholas	
36	Parley Sports	3–5	Exeter City	
37	Southampton Saints	2–0	Swindon Spitfires	
38	Torquay United	2–4	Swindon Town	

== First round proper ==
The draw for the first round was made on 3 November 2014. All ties with the exception of the matches at Chorley and C & K Basildon were played on 6 December 2014. The remaining two took place on 14 December 2014.

Number of teams per tier still in competition
WSL 1	WSL 2	Premier Division	Division One	Regional & County	Total
8 / 8	10 / 10	24 / 24	30 / 30	10 / 10	82 / 82

7 December 2014	Bedford (4)	0–1	Ipswich Town (4)	Wootton
		Report	Bitten	Stadium: Weston Park

7 December 2014	Blackpool Wren Rovers (5)	2–3	Sheffield United Community (5)	Blackpool
	Goal	Report	Goal	Stadium: Brews Park

7 December 2014	Cheltenham Town (4)	1–2	Exeter City (4)	Cheltenham
	Donaldson 35'	Report	Barter 68'; Knapman 70'	Stadium: Newlands Park

7 December 2014	Crystal Palace (4)	2–0	Milton Keynes Dons (4)	Bromley
	Dyett; Igbavboa	Report		Stadium: Hayes Lane

7 December 2014	Eastbourne Town (5)	1–1 (a.e.t.) (5–4 p)	Chichester City (4)	Eastbourne
	Goal	Report	Goal	Stadium: The Saffrons
	Penalties
	Penalty scored		Penalty scored Penalty missed

7 December 2014	Forest Green Rovers (4)	2–0	Southampton Saints (4)	Cambridge
	Goal	Report		Stadium: Thornhill Park

7 December 2014	Herne Bay (5)	0–1	Carshalton Athletic (5)	Herne Bay
		Report	Goal	Stadium: Winch's Field

7 December 2014	Hull City (5)	3–2	Mossley Hill (4)	Kingston upon Hull
	Goal	Report	Perry 24'; James 77'	Stadium: Hull University Sports Ground

7 December 2014	Larkhall Athletic (4)	0–0 (a.e.t.) (4–5 p)	Swindon Town (4)	Larkhall
		Report		Stadium: The Plain Ham Ground
	Penalties
	Penalty scored Penalty missed		(penalty scored) Rich; (penalty scored) Thompson; (penalty scored) Coe; (penalty scored) Quinn; (penalty scored) Austin

7 December 2014	Leeds (4)	1–0	Guiseley Vixens (4)	Emley
	Ross 55'	Report		Stadium: Welfare Ground; Attendance: 72

7 December 2014	Leicester City Ladies (4)	1–4	FC Reedswood (4)	Hinckley
	Goal	Report	Goal	Stadium: Leicester Road

7 December 2014	Liverpool Marshall Feds (4)	3–0	Stockport County (4)	Liverpool
	Wensley 2'; Douglas 20', 74'	Report		Stadium: IM Marsh

7 December 2014	London Corinthians (5)	2–3	Lowestoft Town (5)	Blackheath
	Goal	Report	Drake 45'; Thomas 50'; Shorten 88'	Stadium: Rectory Field

7 December 2014	Loughborough Students (4)	0–1	Leicester City (4)	Loughborough
		Report	Worts 32'	Stadium: Holywell Park

7 December 2014	Luton Town (4)	1–0	Cambridge United (4)	Luton
	Goal	Report		Stadium: Stockwood Park Athletics Stadium

7 December 2014	Morecambe (4)	5–2	Norton & Stockton Ancients (4)	Lancaster
	Goal	Report	Goal	Stadium: Lancaster and Morecambe College

7 December 2014	Radcliffe Olympic (4)	3–1	Mansfield Town (4)	Radcliffe-on-Trent
	Robinson 21'; Bailey 75'; Smith 77'	Report	Douglas 68'	Stadium: Wharf Lane

7 December 2014	The New Saints (5)	5–2	Loughborough Foxes (4)	Oswestry
	Goal	Report	Goal	Stadium: Park Hall

14 December 2014	C&K Basildon (4)	6–2	Maidenhead United (5)	Basildon
	Doo; Lacey; Rushen; Sinclair	Report	Brett; Smith	Stadium: The Hive

14 December 2014	Chorley (4)	5–2	Rotherham United (4)	Croston
	Coope 33', 56', 79'; Smith 36'; Cadwallader 44'	Report	Venue 1'; Wild 88'	Stadium: Bishop Rawstorne Church of England Academy; Attendance: 20

== Second round proper ==
The FA Women's Premier League teams entered at this stage. All matches were played on 11 January 2015. The ties between Blackburn Rovers and Liverpool Marshall and Swindon Town and Carshalton Athletic were postponed with the later facing a FA investigation. Blackburn Rovers and Liverpool Marshall eventually played the match on 25 January after postponements due to a waterlogged and frozen pitches. Carhalton Athletic were awarded a walkover as Swindon Town were ejected from the competition for fielding an ineligible player in the 3rd round of qualifying.

Number of teams per tier still in competition
WSL 1	WSL 2	Premier Division	Division One	Regional & County	Total
8 / 8	10 / 10	24 / 24	14 / 30	6 / 10	76 / 82

11 January 2015	Bradford City (3)	3–2	Huddersfield Town (3)	Thackley
	Lee 15'; Whitham 25'	Report	Hastings 28'; Heckler 43'	Stadium: Dennyfield

11 January 2015	Brighton & Hove Albion (3)	6–2	West Ham United (3)	Brighton
	Goal	Report	Sherwood 25'; McCrea 30'	Stadium: Withdean Stadium

11 January 2015	Charlton Athletic (3)	3–2 (a.e.t.)	Cardiff City (3)	Thamesmead
	Dixson 68', 109'	Report	C. Williams 33'; Aldridge 63'	Stadium: Bayliss Avenue; Attendance: 72

11 January 2015	Chorley (4)	2–3	FC Reedswood (4)	Croston
	Parry 11'; Coope 89'	Report	Clarke 14'; Hughes 22'; Duggan 32'	Stadium: Bishop Rawstorne Church of England Academy

11 January 2015	Coventry City (3)	3–1	Leeds (4)	Coventry
	Goal	Report	Huegett 64'	Stadium: Sphinx Drive

11 January 2015	Crystal Palace (4)	2–0	Ipswich Town (4)	Bromley
	Shakes; Igbavboa	Report		Stadium: Hayes Lane

11 January 2015	Eastbourne Town (5)	1–0	Queens Park Rangers (3)	Eastbourne
	Goal	Report		Stadium: The Saffrons

11 January 2015	Exeter City (4)	1–3	Lewes (3)	Exminster
	Goal	Report	Heather 10'; Spice 30'; Newton 52'	Stadium: Minster Park; Attendance: 40

11 January 2015	Forest Green Rovers (4)	2–4 (a.e.t.)	Keynsham Town (3)	Cambridge
	Goal	Report	Goal	Stadium: Thornhill Park

11 January 2015	Gillingham (3)	0–5	Portsmouth (3)	Chatham
		Report	Umotong 11', 48', 60'; Wilson 27'; Kempson 61'	Stadium: The Sports Ground

11 January 2015	Leicester City (4)	0–8	Sheffield (3)	Leicester
		Report	Goal	Stadium: Riverside Pavilion

11 January 2015	Lowestoft Town (5)	2–1	Luton Town (4)	Lowestoft
	Larkins; Scully	Report	Goal	Stadium: Crown Meadow; Attendance: 231

11 January 2015	Morecambe (4)	4–2	Sheffield United Community (5)	Lancaster
	Goal	Report	Lacey 27'; Bell 68'	Stadium: Lancaster and Morecambe College

11 January 2015	Nottingham Forest (3)	1–3	Preston North End (3)	Basford
	Guyler 83'	Report	Goal	Stadium: Greenwich Avenue

11 January 2015	Plymouth Argyle (3)	2–3	C&K Basildon (4)	Ivybridge
	Mousley 53'	Report	Doo; Rushen	Stadium: Ivybridge Community College

11 January 2015	Radcliffe Olympic (4)	3–1	Hull City (5)	Radcliffe-on-Trent
	Jackson 35', 40'; Saulter 75'	Report	Goal	Stadium: Wharf Lane

11 January 2015	Sporting Club Albion (3)	0–2	Stoke City (3)	Halesowen
		Report	Goal	Stadium: Grove Recreation Ground

11 January 2015	Swindon Town (4)	O–W	Carshalton Athletic (5)
		Report
Note: Tie awarded to Carshalton Athletic. Swindon disqualified for fielding ineligible player in third round qualifying.

11 January 2015	The New Saints (5)	3–5	Derby County (3)	Oswestry
	Goal	Report	Grimadell 5'; Newton 56'; Johnson 70', 73'; Perry 87'	Stadium: Park Hall; Attendance: 134

11 January 2015	Tottenham Hotspur (3)	2–1 (a.e.t.)	Copsewood Coventry (3)	Ware
	O'Leary 67'; Martin 115'	Report	Christie 44'	Stadium: Wodson Park

11 January 2015	Wolverhampton Wanderers (3)	2–1	Newcastle United (3)	Hednesford
	Selmes 39', 89'	Report	Crooks	Stadium: Keys Park

25 January 2015	Liverpool Marshall Feds (4)	2–13	Blackburn Rovers (3)	Liverpool
	Wensley 70', 74'	Report	Sheen 3', 23', 53'; Boyle 7', 32', 45', 48', 65'; Holbrook 10', 40'; Taylor 37'; Jones 61', 78'	Stadium: I.M. Marsh Campus

== Third round proper ==
The draw for the 3rd round was made at Wembley on 12 January 2015. Sides from the 2014 FA WSL 2 league enter the competition at this stage. All ties were played on 1 February 2015, with the exception of Doncaster's tie which was staged the day before. The winners of each match received £400. Six matches were rearranged for 8 February due to adverse weather conditions.

Number of teams per tier still in competition
WSL 1	WSL 2	Premier Division	Division One	Regional & County	Total
8 / 8	10 / 10	14 / 24	5 / 30	3 / 10	40 / 82

31 January 2015	Doncaster Rovers Belles (2)	3–0	London Bees (2)	Doncaster
	Goal	Report		Stadium: Keepmoat Stadium

1 February 2015	Aston Villa (2)	2–1	Sunderland (1)	Sutton Coldfield
	Holmes 29' (o.g.); Owen 90'	Report	Ramshaw 18'	Stadium: Coles Lane; Referee: Sarah Garrett

1 February 2015	Blackburn Rovers (3)	4–5	Portsmouth (3)	Darwen
	Jones 11', 28'; Stanway 78'; Holbrook 87'	Report	Umotong 5', 51', 78'; Wilson 26'; Clark 47'	Stadium: Anchor Ground

1 February 2015	Carshalton Athletic (5)	2–5	Keynsham Town (3)	Carshalton
	Goal	Report	Goal	Stadium: War Memorial Sports Ground; Referee: Alperen Nayir

1 February 2015	Eastbourne Town (5)	2–4 (a.e.t.)	Derby County (3)	Eastbourne
	Goal	Report	Perry 25', 103'; Griffiths 41'; Newton 105'	Stadium: The Saffrons

1 February 2015	Morecambe (4)	2–3	Stoke City (3)	Morecambe
	Goal	Report	Goal	Stadium: Globe Arena

1 February 2015	Oxford United (2)	0–3	Coventry City (3)	Abingdon-on-Thames
		Report	Goal	Stadium: The Northcourt

1 February 2015	Tottenham Hotspur (3)	5–1	Preston North End (3)	Wood Green
	Vio 41', 69'; O'Leary 58'; Martin 62'; Leon 89'	Report	Chadwick 84'	Stadium: White Hart Lane Community Sports Centre

1 February 2015	Watford (2)	2–1	Brighton & Hove Albion (3)	Berkhamsted
	Goal	Report	Goal	Stadium: Broadwater Stadium

1 February 2015	Yeovil Town (2)	4–1	Lewes (3)	Sherborne
	Yorston 18'; Bleazard 33'; Curson 41'; Heatherson 73'	Report	Khassal 37'	Stadium: Raleigh Grove; Attendance: 255

8 February 2015	Bradford City (3)	5–0	FC Reedswood (4)	Thackley
	Sharp 10', 48'; Lee 30'; Danby 36'; Barker 58'	Report		Stadium: Dennyfield

8 February 2015	C & K Basildon (4)	0–5	Sheffield (3)	Harlow
		Report	Goal	Stadium: The Harlow Arena

8 February 2015	Charlton Athletic (3)	2–0	Wolverhampton Wanderers (3)	Thamesmead
	Pittuck 44'; Clifford 46'	Report		Stadium: Bayliss Avenue; Attendance: 84

8 February 2015	Crystal Palace (4)	0–3	Reading (2)	Bromley
		Report	Goal	Stadium: Hayes Lane
Note: Tie awarded to Crystal Palace due to Reading fielding two ineligible players.

8 February 2015	Millwall Lionesses (2)	3–0	Lowestoft Town (5)	Beckenham
	Goal	Report		Stadium: Eden Park Avenue

8 February 2015	Radcliffe Olympic (4)	2–0	Durham (2)	Radcliffe-on-Trent
	Ramadan 72'; Jones 76'	Report		Stadium: Wharf Lane

== Fourth round proper ==
The draw for the fourth round was made on 2 February. Matches played on 8 March 2015.

Number of teams per tier still in competition
WSL 1	WSL 2	Premier Division	Division One	Regional & County	Total
7 / 8	6 / 10	9 / 24	2 / 30	0 / 10	24 / 82

7 March 2015	Portsmouth (3)	1–4	Millwall Lionesses (2)	Fareham
	Hillier 30'	Report	Goal	Stadium: Cams Alders Stadium

8 March 2015	Aston Villa (2)	2–1 (a.e.t.)	Yeovil Town (2)	Sutton Coldfield
	Fergusson 36'; Wilkinson 114'	Report	Haigh 86'	Stadium: Central Ground

8 March 2015	Bradford City (3)	1–2	Doncaster Rovers Belles (2)	Bradford
	Stuart 80'	Report	Goal	Stadium: Dennyfield

8 March 2015	Charlton Athletic (3)	3–3 (a.e.t.) (4–2 p)	Crystal Palace (4)	Thamesmead
	Howlett 12'; Graham 25', 76'	Report	Kiobel; Shakes	Stadium: Bayliss Avenue; Attendance: 170
	Penalties
	Shepherd (penalty scored); Dixson (penalty missed); Lynch (penalty scored); Whinnett (penalty scored); Pittuck (penalty scored)		(penalty missed) Shakes; (penalty missed) Holdaway; (penalty scored) Dyett; (penalty scored) Oninawa

8 March 2015	Derby County (3)	0–3	Tottenham Hotspur (3)	Spondon
		Report	Leon 11'; O'Leary 20'; Bergin 36'	Stadium: Anderson Electrical Arena; Attendance: 54

8 March 2015	Sheffield (3)	4–0	Radcliffe Olympic (4)	Dronfield
	Goal	Report		Stadium: Home of Football Ground

8 March 2015	Stoke City (3)	1–3	Coventry City (3)	Trent Vale
	Roberts 10'	Report	Goal	Stadium: Clayton Wood Training Ground

8 March 2015	Watford (2)	2–1	Keynsham Town (3)	Berkhamsted
	Goal	Report	Goal	Stadium: Broadwater Stadium

== Fifth round proper ==
The eight winners of round four are joined by the eight 2014 FA WSL teams. The draw was held on 9 March 2015. Besides the eight WSL 1 teams, there remain four WSL 2 and four teams from the Premier League (Level 3) teams: Charlton Athletic, Coventry City, Sheffield, Tottenham. Matches played on 22 and 24 March.

Number of teams per tier still in competition
WSL 1	WSL 2	Premier Division	Division One	Regional & County	Total
7 / 8	5 / 10	4 / 24	0 / 30	0 / 10	16 / 82

22 March 2015	Aston Villa (2)	2–0	Sheffield (3)	Sutton Coldfield
	Goal	Report		Stadium: Central Ground

22 March 2015	Birmingham City (1)	3–1	Liverpool (1)	Solihull
	Moore 17'; Potter 39'; Allen 90'	Report	Dowie 26'	Stadium: Damson Park; Attendance: 401; Referee: Richard Watson

22 March 2015	Chelsea (1)	6–0	Watford (2)	Staines-upon-Thames
	Ji 10'; Banusic 14', 43', 64'; Davison 30'; Bright 80'	Report		Stadium: Wheatsheaf Park; Attendance: 264

22 March 2015	Coventry City (3)	1–2	Charlton Athletic (3)	Bedworth
	Goal	Report	Goal	Stadium: [Bedworth United F.C.|The Oval]]

22 March 2015	Everton (2)	2–1 (a.e.t.)	Bristol Academy (1)	Widnes
	Whipp 79'; George 111'	Report	Watts 57'	Stadium: Halton Stadium; Attendance: 367

22 March 2015	Manchester City (1)	3–1	Doncaster Rovers Belles (2)	Manchester
	Parris 32', 79'; Duggan 90'	Report	Little 4'	Stadium: Academy Stadium; Attendance: 514; Referee: Peter Wright

22 March 2015	Millwall Lionesses (2)	0–7	Arsenal (1)	Bermondsey
		Report	Carter 18', 52', 85'; Sanderson 24'; Nobbs 41'; Natalia 55'; Humphrey 75'	Stadium: The Den

22 March 2015	Notts County (1)	4–0	Tottenham Hotspur (3)	Nottingham
	Walton 16'; White 46'; O'Sullivan 89', 90'	Report		Stadium: Meadow Lane; Attendance: 459; Referee: Matthew Bacon

== Quarter-finals ==
The draw for the quarter-finals was made on 23 March 2015. Matches were played on 12 April.

Number of teams per tier still in competition
WSL 1	WSL	Premier Division	Division One	Regional & County	Total
6 / 8	1 / 10	1 / 24	0 / 30	0 / 10	8 / 82

12 April 2015	Arsenal (1)	1–2	Chelsea (1)	Borehamwood
	Mitchell 45'	Report	Chapman 18'; Davison 30'	Stadium: Meadow Park; Attendance: 936; Referee: Andrew Aylott

12 April 2015	Everton (2)	1–1 (4–3 p)	Charlton Athletic (3)	Widnes
	Stewart 87'	Report	Graham 88'	Stadium: Halton Stadium; Attendance: 311
	Penalties
	Stewart (penalty scored); Hinnigan (penalty scored); V. Jones (penalty scored); K. Jones (penalty missed); Magill (penalty scored)		(penalty scored) Shepherd; (penalty scored) Dixson; (penalty missed) Lynch; (penalty scored) Whinnett; (penalty missed) Pittuck

12 April 2015	Manchester City (1)	3–1	Birmingham City (1)	Manchester City
	Duggan 16'; Parris 67'; Scott 87'	Report	Jade-Haines 82'	Stadium: Academy Stadium; Attendance: 450; Referee: Ricky Wootton

12 April 2015	Notts County (1)	5–1	Aston Villa (1)	Nottingham
	White 45'; Bassett 53'; Whelan 65'; Susi 71', 84'	Report	Welsh 74'	Stadium: Meadow Lane; Referee: Oliver Bickle

== Semi-finals ==
The draw for the semi-finals was made on 13 April 2015. The Everton v Notts County game was played on 3 May at Goodison Park. The Chelsea v Manchester City game took place on 4 May at Adams Park.

Number of teams per tier still in competition
WSL 1	WSL 2	Premier Division	Division One	Regional & County	Total
3 / 8	1 / 10	0 / 24	0 / 30	0 / 10	4 / 82

3 May 2015	Everton (2)	0–3	Notts County (1)	Walton
		Report	Clarke 46'; White 56'; Buet 80'	Stadium: Goodison Park; Attendance: 1,271; Referee: Anthony Tankard

4 May 2015	Chelsea (1)	1–0	Manchester City (1)	High Wycombe
	Ji 84'	Report		Stadium: Adams Park; Attendance: 867; Referee: Adrian Quelch

== Final ==
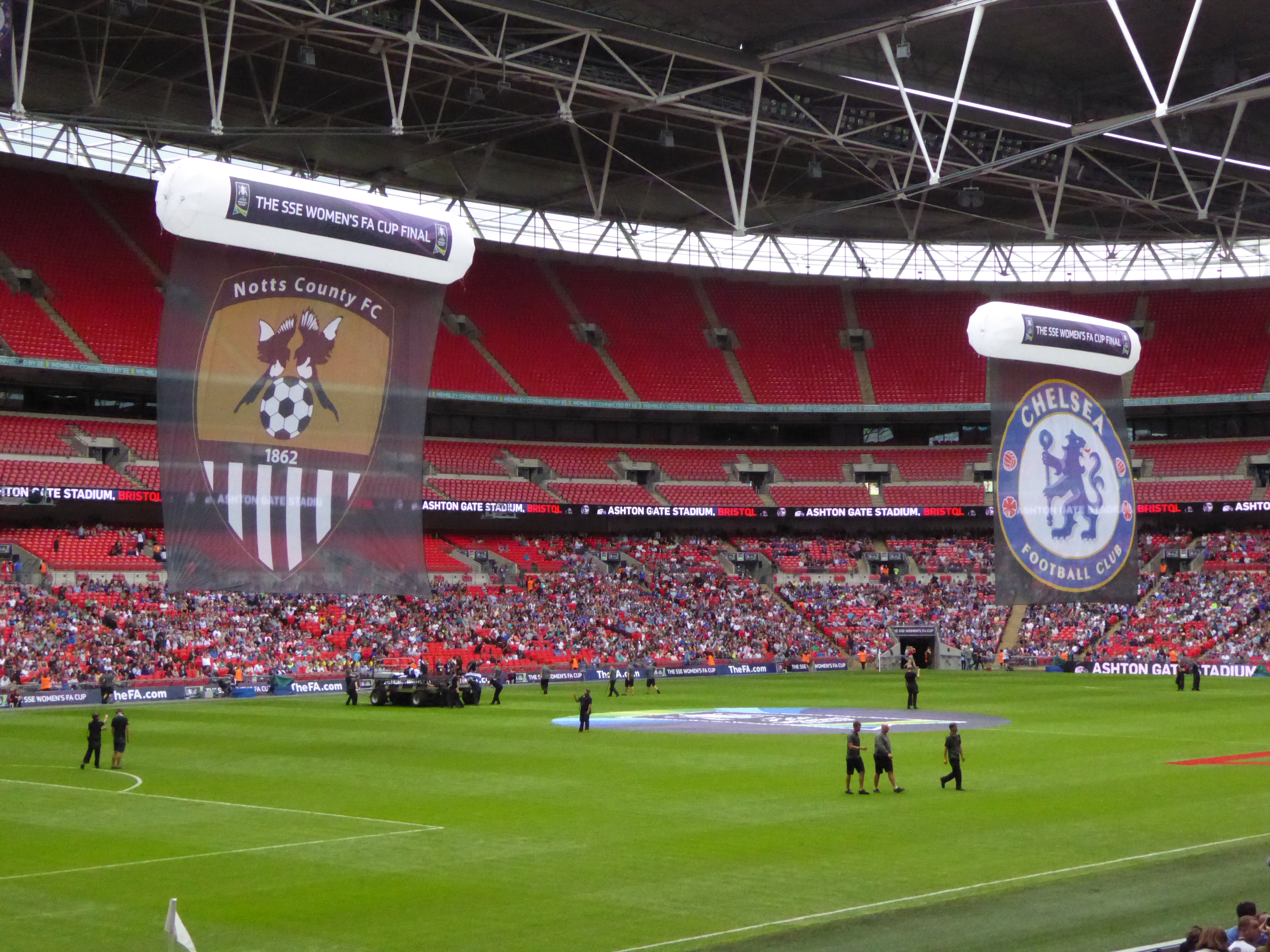
Chelsea vs Notts County before the Women's FA Cup final at Wembley Stadium.

The final of the FA Women's Cup was held for the first time at Wembley Stadium. It was played on 1 August 2015. The match was broadcast live on BBC One.

1 August 2015
15:00 BST

Chelsea	1–0	Notts County
Ji 37'	Report

Wembley Stadium, London
Attendance: 30,710
Referee: Amy Fearn (Derbyshire)
