= Eastbourne Town W.F.C. =

Association football club in England

Eastbourne Town Women
- Full name: Eastbourne Town Women Football Club
- Nickname: The Town
- Founded: 6 May 2002; 24 years ago
- Ground: The Saffrons, Eastbourne
- Capacity: 3,000 (200 Seated)
- Coordinates: 50°45′57″N 0°16′35″E
- Chairman: Dave Shearing
- Manager: Alan Dale
- League: Sussex County Women and Girls Football League Premier Division
- 2025–26: Sussex County Women and Girls Football League Premier Division, 7th of 8
- Website: http://eastbournetown.com/
Home colours	Away colours

Eastbourne Town Women F.C. is an English football club based in Eastbourne, East Sussex, England. They currently play in the Sussex County Women and Girls Football League Premier Division.

They are founding members of the Sussex County Women and Girls Football League in 2004.

Eastbourne Town Women play their home games at The Saffrons, and are affiliated to Eastbourne Town.

== History ==
=== 2002–2011: The early years ===
Originally known as Eastbourne Town Ladies, they were formed on 6 May 2002, being transferred from Polegate Grasshoppers Under 15s to make the jump into senior football. The team entered Division Three of the South East Counties Women's League for the 2002–03 season, finishing in third place below Woking Reserves and Lindfield and being promoted to Division Two along with Crawley Wasps. The following season wasn’t successful, with players leaving for education reasons; they finished 8th in the table, but with the creation of the Sussex County Women and Girls Football League in 2004, the team took the drop.

The ladies spent one season in the league, came runners-up and won their first piece of silverware, the Sussex County Women’s Challenge Trophy, against Burgess Hill Town. They then transferred back to the South East Counties League Division 1. Barely being able to stay in the division for the first two seasons, the 2007-08 season proved to be the start of success. Although losing the first game of the season to Meadow Sports, they completed the rest of the season unbeaten, finishing the season as runners-up. The Ladies won a double in the 2008-09 season, winning the South East Counties Chairman's Cup and the Division 1 title and earning promotion to the Premier Division. They were crowned league champions in the 2010-11 season and were runners-up in the S.E.C. League Cup, but they earned promotion into the London and South East Women's Regional Football League Premier Division for the first time; at the time, there was only one division.

=== 2011–2021: London & South East league ===
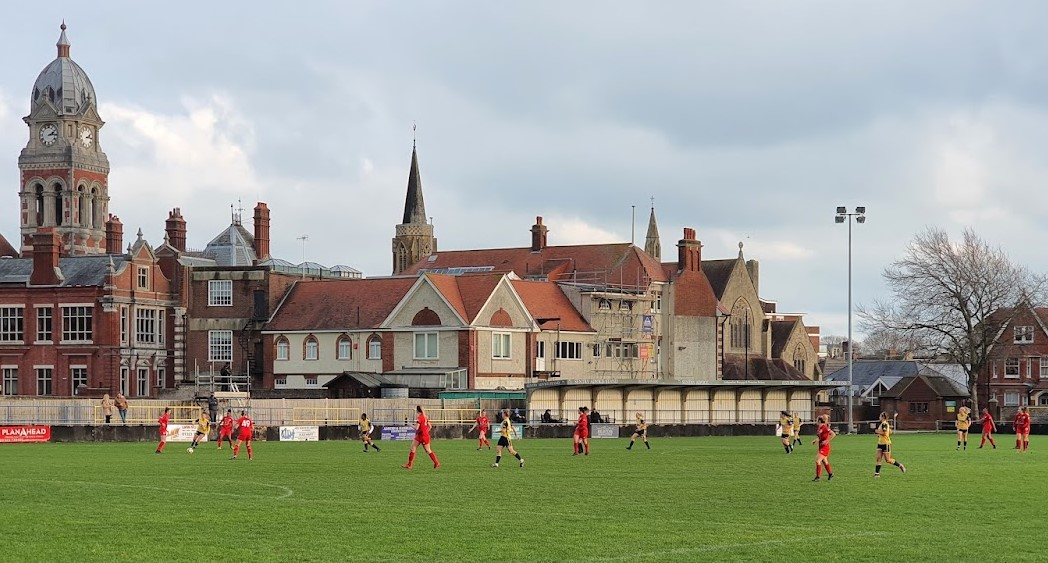
Eastbourne Town Women against the then Leyton Orient Women in December 2020

The first season in the London and South East League was most successful at the time; they reached 2nd place in the table, losing out on promotion into the FA Women's National League by 4 points. After that, the form slipped over the next few seasons, hovering just outside the relegation zone.

In 2014, Garry Pearce, the manager, had stepped down after 12 seasons in charge, and the 2014–15 season saw player Emma Parslow becoming player-manager with Theo Parfitt as joint manager. Although finishing 11th in the league, the women made their record Women's FA Cup run during the 2014–15 season by reaching the third round, starting their run winning 7–0 against Burgess Hill Town Women, 3–1 against Parkwood Rangers and 5–0 against Gosport Borough Ladies in the first, second and third qualifying rounds. The first round proper saw a 1–1 draw after extra time with Chichester City Ladies but winning the penalty shootout 5–4, taking them to the second round with Queens Park Rangers Girls, winning 1–0 before losing in the third round to Derby County Women 2–4 after extra time. All of Eastbourne Town's games were played at home.

In 2016 both Emma and Theo stepped down from their joint role, which was taken over by Stuart Tibble for just one season. Theo Parfitt took over again with the team goalkeeper, Sarah Walshaw, for the 2017–18 season before university graduate Charlie Woodham took the reins for the 2018–19 season. For nine seasons since finishing runners-up, the Ladies continued to hover around the relegation zone; several management changes and a poor form of results saw no improvement. On 10 June 2019, the team renamed themselves to Eastbourne Town Women and were joined by Zak Dove, replacing Charlie Woodham as manager, but after a few months came the COVID-19 pandemic, which halted the 2019–20 season along with the following season. In June 2021 Zak Dove stepped down from his role as manager.

=== 2021–present: Sussex county league ===
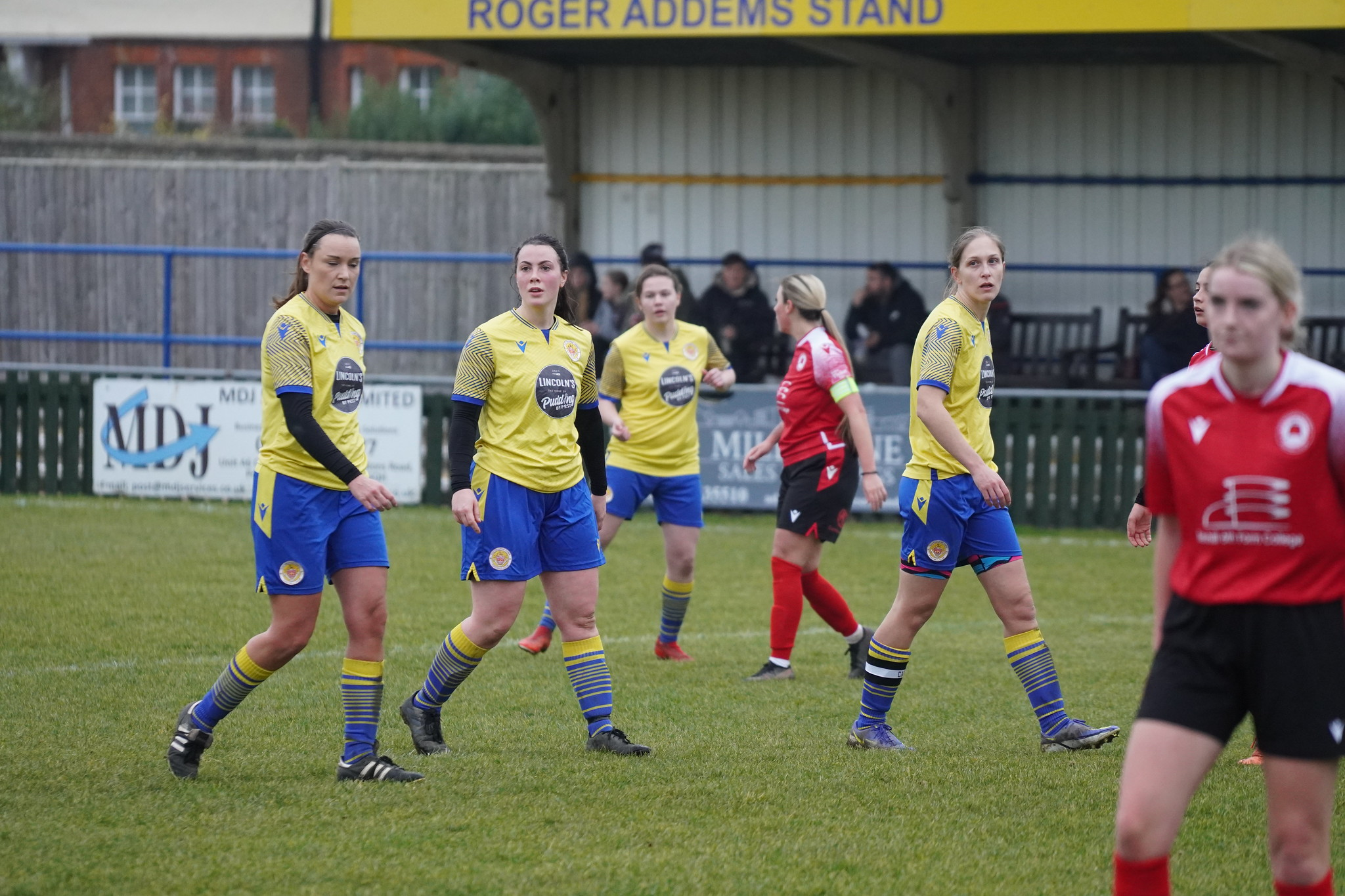
Eastbourne Town Women players in yellow in a local derby match with Eastbourne Borough women in February 2023

In July 2021, the club released a statement announcing that the club was withdrawing from the London and South East regional football league and taking voluntary relegation in to the Sussex County Women and Girls Football League After 16 years since leaving, the women rejoined the league's Premier Division with a new manager, Martin Keightley, and a new team. With some women staying from the previous season and some who were in the early ladies' team rejoining. Martin Keightley resigned after a few months, and Theo Parfitt took over as caretaker manager until Rick Tate took over the role permanently in February 2022. The women were relegated into Division One for the 2022–23 season. After a successful start to the season, the team was sitting at the top of the table. With two games left to play in the season, Denne Park forfeited their game, giving Eastbourne Town an automatic three points, which made them Division One champions and earning them an automatic promotion back into the Premier Division.

In June 2023, it was announced by the club that a development team would be created, led by former player Stef Shambrook taking on the manager role, assisted by Tasha Pearson, also a former player. The team entered Division One of the Sussex County Women's League, but only lasted for the season before disbanding. The first team reached the final of the 2023–24 Sussex Women's Challenge Trophy, and the first final of any competition since 2012. Losing to Saltdean's development squad 9-2. In February 2024, it was announced that Rick Tate would step down as women's team manager. Long-term players Sarah Da Silva and Dani Parfitt were announced as joint player-managers and Richard Dyson, former Eastbourne Borough Women's manager stepped in until the end of the season. The season ended with Town finishing in 6th place. For the 2024–25 season, former player Sarah Walshaw took over the reins for a season struggling for players she became player-manager later in the season with Ed Copping assisting. Town finishing the season just second from bottom; she stepped down at the end of the season with Steve Hadfield taking over. Town finished the 2025–26 season, finishing second from bottom again.

Another management change happened on 17 November 2026, Steve Hadfield stepping down from managing the first team to focus on other club duties, whilst assistant manager Alan Dale was promoted to first team manager.

== Kits ==
=== Football kits ===
Like the men's team, the club's colours have mainly been yellow and dark blue, the colours of William Cavendish, the Duke of Devonshire, which were also adopted around Eastbourne including the fleet of the former Eastbourne Buses.

Away kits have changed over the seasons from white and blue to pink and light blue.

In 2023 a special kit was made for the 2023 Kitlocker Summer Series in Brighton.

2009–2011	2014–2018	2018–2019	2019–2021	2021–2022

=== Kit suppliers and shirt sponsors ===
Period	Kit manufacturer	Shirt sponsor (chest)	Shirt sponsor (back)	Shirt sponsor (arm)
2002–2009	Unknown	ASDA	None	None
2009–2011	(Germany) Adidas	Drusillas Zoo Park	None	None
2011–2014	(England) MKK Sports	Sussex Business Times	None	None
2014–2018	(Italy) Macron	Macron Store Hastings	None	None
2018–2019	(Italy) Errea	Brand Installations	None	None
2019–2021	(Italy) Macron	UK Packaging	Willow Tree	None
2021–2023	(Italy) Macron	Lincolns Bakery	The Bell, Ticehurst	None
2023	(United States) Nike	Kitlocker (Note: Special kit for Kitlocker Summer Series 2023)		
2023–2025	(England) Umbro	Coleman Plant Hire	None	The Beacon
2025–2026	(Italy) Kappa	Graham Plumbers Merchants	None	None
2026-Present	(Italy) Kappa	East Sussex College	None	None

== Ground ==
Eastbourne Town Women currently play their home games at The Saffrons, Compton Place Road, Eastbourne, East Sussex, BN21 1EA. Located in Eastbourne town centre, a 5-minute walk from Eastbourne Railway Station.

== Players ==
As of 23 October 2026

Note: Flags indicate national team as defined under FIFA eligibility rules; some limited exceptions apply. Players may hold more than one non-FIFA nationality.

No.	Pos.	Nation	Player
—	GK	ENG	Darcey Hadfield (Captain)
—	DF	ENG	Madalin Bowerman
—	DF	ENG	Lauren Britt
—	DF	ENG	Amelie Clark
—	DF	ENG	Hollie Dyson
—	DF	ENG	Paige Everton
—	DF	ENG	Lani Farrell
—	DF	ENG	Jasmine Widdows
—	MF	ENG	Charlee Ransley
—	MF	ENG	Ellie-Mae Cullen
—	MF	ENG	Millie Defty

No.	Pos.	Nation	Player
—	MF	ENG	Esme Heath
—	MF	ENG	Imogen Pook
—	MF	ENG	Minnie Sheppard
—	MF	ENG	Zara Stubbs
—	FW	ENG	Nancy Allerton
—	FW	ENG	Madison Norwood
—	FW	ENG	Chloe Nye
—	FW	ENG	Ella Quigley
—	FW	ENG	Ashlee Warrington
—	FW	ENG	Lexie Whiteman

== Management and staff ==
=== Current staff ===
As of 17 November 2026

Position	Name
Manager	(England) Alan Dale
Assistant manager	(England) Cory Charles
Goalkeeping coach	(England) Anthony Dale
Assistant coaches	(England) Ed Copping (England) Max Dale
Physiotherapist	(England) Olivia Hardwick
Director of Women's Football	(England) Steve Hadfield

=== Managerial history ===
Key

- League matches only. M = Matches played; W = Matches won; D = Matches drawn; L = Matches lost; Win % = percentage of total matches won
- † Managers with this background and symbol in the "Name" column are italicised to denote caretaker appointments.
- ‡ Managers with this background and symbol in the "Name" column are italicised to denote caretaker appointments promoted to full-time manager.

Stats as of 17 November 2026.

Dates	Name	M	W	D	L	Win %	Honors	Notes
2002–2014	(England) Gary Pearce						South East Counties Women's League Premier Division Champions: 2010–11; South East Counties Women's League Division One West Champions: 2008–09; South East Counties Women's Chairman's Cup Winners: 2008–09; Sussex County Challenge Trophy Winners: 2004–05	
2014–2016	(England) Emma Parslow & Theo Parfitt	42	5	7	30	11.90		
2016–2017	(England) Stuart Tibble	18	3	2	13	16.67		
2017–2018	(England) Theo Parfitt & Sarah Walshaw	16	3	2	11	18.75		
2018–2019	(England) Charlie Woodham	23	8	2	13	34.78		
2019–2021	(England) Zak Dove	9	3	2	4	33.33		
2021-2021	(England) Martin Keightley	3	0	0	3	0.00		
2021–2022	(England) Theo Parfitt †	4	0	1	3	0.00		
2022–2024	(England) Rick Tate ‡	37	20	3	14	54.05	Sussex County Women's League Division One Champions: 2022–23	
2024	(England) Sarah Da Silva & Dani Parfitt †	1	0	0	1	0.00		
2024	(England) Richard Dyson †	1	0	0	1	0.00		
2024–2025	(England) Sarah Walshaw	14	2	0	12	14.29		
2025 – 2026	(England) Steve Hadfield	23	5	2	16	21.74		
2026 – Present	(England) Alan Dale	0	0	0	0	—		

== Season summary ==
Winners	Runners-up	Third place	Promoted	Relegated	Transferred	♦ Top scorer in division

Results of league and cup competitions by season
Season	League										FA Cup	League Cup	Top scorer		Notes
Season	Tier	Division	P	W	D	L	F	A	Pts	Pos	FA Cup	League Cup	Top scorer		Notes
2002–03	7	South East Counties Division 3 ↑	18	12	2	4	71	46	38	3rd	—	1R			
2003–04	6	South East Counties Division 2 →	22	7	0	15	38	86	21	8th	—	1R			
2004–05	6	Sussex County Division 1 →								2nd	1Q	—			
2005–06	6	South East Counties Division 1 West	20	5	2	13	28	66	14	8th	1Q	—			
2006–07	6	South East Counties Division 1 West	16	3	3	10	18	34	12	8th	2Q	—			
2007–08	6	South East Counties Division 1 West	18	13	4	1	70	18	43	2nd	PR	—			
2008–09	6	South East Counties Division 1 West ↑	14	10	1	3	49	11	31	1st	1Q	1R			
2009–10	6	South East Counties Premier Division	19	12	2	5	38	21	38	3rd	3Q	QF			
2010–11	6	South East Counties Premier Division ↑	16	11	3	2	58	11	36	1st	3Q	Runners up			
2011–12	5	London & South East Premier Division	20	12	5	3	46	24	41	2nd	2Q	—			
2012–13	5	London & South East Premier Division	20	7	2	11	25	48	21	7th	3Q	—			
2013–14	5	London & South East Premier Division	20	3	4	13	17	50	13	9th	2Q	—			
2014–15	5	London & South East Premier Division	22	2	4	16	25	55	10	11th	R3	QF	Janine Daly	8	
2015–16	5	London & South East Premier Division	20	3	3	14	14	62	11	10th	2Q	—	Delphine Nonin	3	
2016–17	5	London & South East Premier Division	18	3	2	13	12	48	11	9th	—	GS	Danielle Parfitt	5	
2017–18	5	London & South East Premier Division	16	3	2	11	15	42	11	8th	3Q	GS	Catherine Hyland	6	
2018–19	5	London & South East Premier Division	16	7	1	8	23	23	22	6th	PR	GS	Catherine Hyland	10	
2019–20	5	London & South East Premier Division	13	2	3	8	12	31	9	8th (Note: 2019–20 League abandoned due to the COVID-19 pandemic, all league results expunged)	1Q	GS	Molly Hill; Danielle Parfitt	6	
2020–21	5	London & South East Premier Division ↓	3	2	0	1	7	4	6	6th (Note: 2020–21 League curtailed due to the COVID-19 pandemic, Eastbourne Town Women took voluntary relegation)	3Q	—	Nicole Baitup; Kellie Larkin	4	
2021–22	7	Sussex County Premier Division ↓	16	2	1	13	6	81	7	8th	1Q	2R	Danielle Parfitt	2	
2022–23	8	Sussex County Division 1 ↑	16	13	1	2	52	25	40	1st	—	2R	Danielle Parfitt	23 ♦	
2023–24	7	Sussex County Premier Division	14	5	2	7	42	31	17	6th	—	QF	Geri Burt	20	
2024–25	7	Sussex County Premier Division	14	2	0	12	5	68	6	7th	2Q	2R	Maya Beesley	2	
2025–26	7	Sussex County Premier Division	14	3	2	9	25	47	11	7th	–	2R	Sophie Jessop; Rebecca Relf; Aslee Warrington; Lexie Whiteman	4	
2026–27	7	Sussex County Premier Division									PR				

== Honors ==
=== League honours ===
- London and South East Women's Regional Football League
  - Premier Division Runners-up (1): 2011–12
- South East Counties Women's League
  - Premier Division Champions (1): 2010–11
  - Division 1 West Champions (1): 2008–09
  - Division 1 West Runners-up (1): 2007–08
- Sussex County Women's League
  - Division 1 Champions (1): 2022–23
  - Division 1 Runners-up (1): 2004–05

=== Cup honours ===
- Isthmian Ladies Cup
  - Runners up (3):2009–10, 2010–11, 2011–12
- South East Counties Women's League Cup
  - Runners up (1): 2010–11
- South East Counties Women's Chairman's Cup
  - Winners (1): 2008–09
- Sussex County Challenge Trophy
  - Winners (1): 2004–05
  - Runners up (1):2023–23

=== Doubles ===
- 2008–09: SECWL Division One Champions and Chairmans Cup

== Club records ==
- Best League Performance: London & South East Premier Division 2011–12, 2nd
- Best Women's FA Cup performance: Third Round, 2014–15
- Biggest League Win: 17 - 0 v Meadow Sports, South East Counties Women's League, 19 April 2009
- Biggest Cup Win: 10 - 1 v Sheerness East, SECW League Cup, 2 November 2008
- Most points in a season: 43 in 18 games, South East Counties Division 1 West 2007–08
