= Ellie Leek =

Welsh footballer (born 1995)

Ellie Thomas-Leek
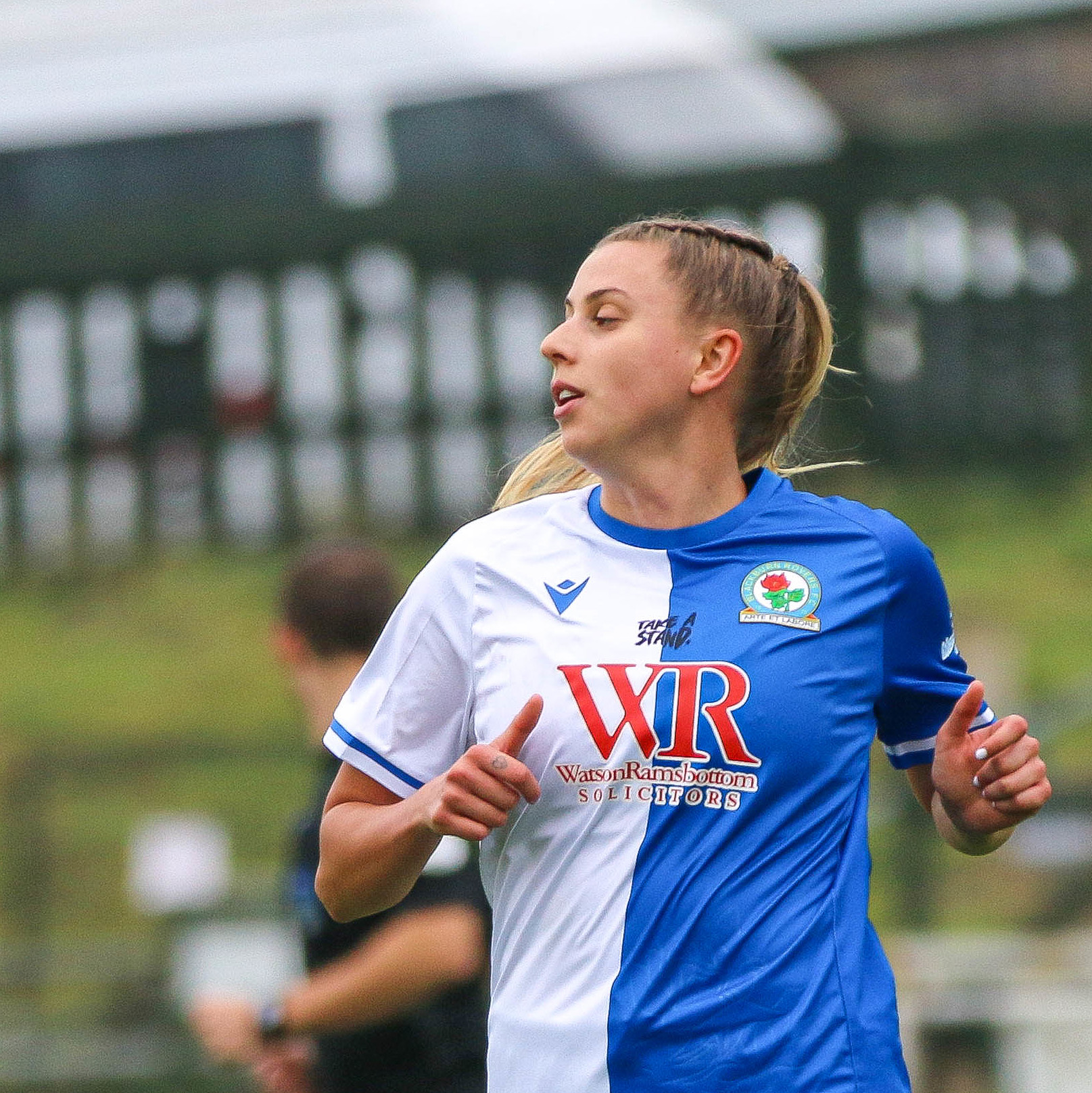
- Leek featuring for Blackburn Rovers in 2021

Personal information
- Date of birth: 21 January 1995 (age 31)
- Place of birth: Torfaen, Wales
- Height: 1.72 m (5 ft 8 in)
- Position: Midfielder

Team information
- Current team: Brentford

Youth career
- Bristol Academy

College career
Years	Team	Apps	(Gls)
2014–2017	Auburn University	80	(8)

Senior career*
Years	Team	Apps	(Gls)
2012–2013	Bristol Academy	0	(0)
2018–2019	Le Havre	21	(5)
2019	Charlton Athletic	2	(0)
2019–2021	Lewes	16	(1)
2021–2023	Blackburn Rovers	30	(3)
2023–2025	Stoke City		
2025–2026	Leyton Orient		
2026	Bolton Wanderers		
2026–	Brentford		

International career
2011–2012	Wales U17	3	(0)
2014	Wales U19	3	(0)
- * Club domestic league appearances and goals

Ellie Thomas-Leek (born 21 January 1995) is a Welsh professional footballer who plays as a midfielder for Brentford.

== Club career ==
Leek started her career at Bristol Academy Women's (now known as Bristol City), however only ever featured as a substitute after coming through the centre of excellence as a teenager.

Ellie played for four years in the United States playing for Auburn University, before taking the trip to French side Le Havre who play their games in the Division 2 Féminine.

She then returned to England as Leek featured for Charlton Athletic before joining Lewes in 2019.

Leek signed for Blackburn Rovers in 2021 after leaving Lewes at the end of the FA Women's Championship 2020–21 season. She has since played for Stoke City, Leyton Orient, Bolton Wanderers and Brentford.

== International career ==
Leek featured for both the under 17's and the under 19's at international level for Wales Women's at the UEFA Women's Championships.

She is also eligible to feature for England Women's National Football Team.

== Personal life ==
Leek is currently in a relationship with Tottenham Hotspur striker, Martha Thomas who has been a big supporter of the LGBTQ+ community and Stonewall's Rainbow Laces campaign.
