= Sussex County Women and Girls Football League =

Sussex County Women & Girls Football League
- Founded: 31 March 2004; 22 years ago
- First season: 2004–05
- Country: England
- Divisions: Premier Division; Championship; Division One
- Number of clubs: 26; 10 Premier Division; 9 Championship; 7 Division One
- Level on pyramid: 7–9
- Promotion to: London and South East Women's Regional Football League Division One South
- Domestic cup(s): Women's FA Cup; Sussex Women's Challenge Cup
- League cup: League Challenge Cup
- Current champions: Three Bridges Women (1st title) (2025–26)
- Most championships: Adur Athletic Ladies; Eastbourne Borough Women (2 titles)
- Website: Official website

The Sussex County Women & Girls Football League is an association football league in England. The competition covers the county of Sussex. The league was founded by the Sussex Football Association in 2004.

The League is divided into three divisions for adult players: Premier, Championship, and Division One at level 7 of the women's football pyramid. Child players are divided into age groups. It promotes to the London and South East Women's Regional Football League, and does not relegate to any league.

The League also organises its own knock-out cup competition, the Sussex County Women's League Challenge Cup.

The League won the Grassroots League of the Year Award as part of England Football’s Grassroots Football Awards 2023.

== History ==
In early 2004 the Sussex County Football Association (SCFA) was asked by The FA to set up a women's league for the 2004–05 season. An inaugural meeting was held on 31 March 2004, chaired by the SCFA Chief Executive Ken Benham, with clubs from Brighton & Hove Albion, Crowborough Athletic, Crawley Down, Crawley Town, East Grinstead Town, Eastbourne Borough, Eastbourne Town, Hassocks, Hastings United, Haywards Heath Town, Lindfield, Seahaven Harriers and Whitehawk. A poll taken at that meeting determined the clubs were in favour of the League's creation. The League was to be managed by the SCFA council. In summer of 2004, The Sussex Girls League disbanded and in response, the SCFA council agreed to add a girl's section. The first Annual General Meeting of the Sussex Women & Girls Football League was held on 6 July 2004, where they elected the first management committee.

On 12 September 2004, the League began in Sussex with 17 adult clubs and 38 (80 teams) girl's clubs. Adults, Under 15, 14 and 13's played 11-a-side games while Under 14's and 13's played 9-a-side games. The Adult league originally started as two divisions, Division One and Division Two. Although just one division ran in 2005–06 before returning to two divisions for two seasons but going back to the one division in 2008. With the coronavirus pandemic disrupting sport throughout England, the 2019–20 and 2020–21 seasons were both abandoned. The league returned to normal for the 2021–22 season, this time running as three divisions, Premier, Division One and Division Two. Although each division had a different number of teams, Divisions One and Two merged into Division One for the 2023–24 season, the Premier Division with eight teams and Division One with twelve. The 2024–25 season saw three divisions again, Division One renamed to Championship and Division One replacing the former Division Two.

== Current member clubs ==
The league's 2026–27 constitution is as follows:

Premier Division

- Broadbridge Heath Women
- Burgess Hill Town Women
- Crowborough Athletic Ladies
- Eastbourne Town Women
- Hailsham Town Women
- Hassocks Ladies
- Horsham Women
- Pagham Women
- TD Shipley Ladies
- The View Ladies

Championship

- Bexhill United Ladies
- Brighton Seagals
- Chichester City Women
- Ringmer AFC Ladies Under 23's
- Slindon Women
- Three Bridges Women Development
- Westfield Women
- Whitehawk Women
- Worthing Town Women

Division One

- Barnham Trojans Ladies
- Cuckfield Ladies
- Hellingly Link
- Mile Oak Sunday Ladies
- Newhaven Ladies Reserves
- Ringmer AFC Ladies
- Seaford Town Women

== Past League Champions ==
=== 2004–2008 ===
No.	Season	Division One	Division Two
1	2004–05	Eastbourne Borough Ladies	Bognor Regis Town Ladies
2	2005–06	Rottingdean Village Ladies	No competition
3	2006–07	Brighton & Hove Women's II	Adur Athletic Ladies
4	2007–08	Langton Green Tunbridge Wells Ladies	Phoenix Ladies

=== 2008–2021 ===
From 2008 until 2021 the league ran with just one division.

No.	Season	Division One
5	2008–09	Adur Athletic Ladies
6	2009–10	Burgess Hill Town Ladies
7	2010–11	Hassocks Ladies Reserves
8	2011–12	Eastbourne Ladies
9	2012–13	Marle Place Wanderers Ladies
10	2013–14	Adur Athletic Ladies
11	2014–15	Lancing Ladies
12	2015–16	Lewes (Foundation) Ladies
13	2016–17	Oakwood Ladies
14	2017–18	Newhaven Ladies
15	2018–19	AFC Littlehampton
—	2019–20 ^{1}	No champions. Season abandoned
—	2020–21 ^{2}	No champions. Season abandoned

^{1} The 2019–20 season was terminated on 26 March 2020 due to the coronavirus pandemic
^{2} The 2020-21 was curtailed on 24 February 2021 again to the coronavirus pandemic.

=== 2021–Present ===
In 2021, Division One was renamed to Premier Division, and Divisions One and Two were created. In 2023 Division Two was discontinued for just one season, with all teams joining Division One. In 2024 Division One was renamed Championship and Division Two was renamed to Division One.

No.	Season	Premier Division	Division One	Division Two
16	2021–22	Pagham Ladies	AFC Acorns Women Development	Eastbourne Borough Women
17	2022–23	Hassocks Ladies	Eastbourne Town Women	AFC Uckfield Town Ladies
18	2023–24	Saltdean United Women's Development	Worthing Town Women	No competition
		Premier Division	Championship	Division One
19	2024–25	Eastbourne Borough Women	Burgess Hill Town Women	The View Ladies
20	2025–25	Three Bridges Women	TD Shipley Ladies	Whitehawk Women

== League Challenge Cup ==
Challenge Cup winners
Season	Winners	Score	Runners–up	Venue	Attendance	Notes
2005–06	Whitehawk Ladies Reserves	3–2	Rottingdean Village Ladies	Culver Road	N/A	
2006–07	Brighton & Hove Albion Women II	4–1	Hailsham Town Ladies	Middle Road	N/A	
2007–08	Adur Athletic Ladies	6–1	Langton Green Tunbridge Wells Ladies	Haven Field	N/A	
2008–09	Adur Athletic Ladies	1–0	Rottingdean Village Ladies	Haven Field	N/A	
2009–10	Rottingdean Village Ladies	2–1	Chichester City Ladies	Haven Field	N/A	
2010–11	Eastbourne Ladies	2–1	Maresfield Village Ladies	Haven Field	N/A	
2011–12	Eastbourne Ladies	1–1 (4–3 pens)	Worthing Town Ladies	Centenary Park	N/A	
2012–13	Bexhill United Ladies Reserves	1–1 (4–1 pens)	Worthing Ladies	Culver Road	N/A	
2013–14	Rottingdean Village	2–1	Horsham Sparrows Women	Culver Road	N/A	
2014–15	Lewes (Foundation) Ladies	4–1	Hurstpierpoint Ladies	Haven Field	N/A	
2015–16	Lewes (Foundation) Ladies	4–1	Burgess Hill Town Ladies	Culver Road	N/A	
2016–17	Oakwood Ladies	2–0	Montpelier Villa	Culver Road	N/A	
2017–18	Newhaven Ladies	3–2	Saltdean United Ladies	Culver Road	140	
2018–19	Barnham Trojans	4–3	Roffey	Woodside Road	N/A	
2021–22	Montpelier Villa	4–2	Seaford Town Ladies	Culver Road	N/A	
2022–23	Shoreham Women	3–1	Saltdean United Women's Development	Culver Road	N/A	
2023–24	Saltdean United Women's Development	4–1	Horsham Women	Culver Road	N/A	
2024–25	Eastbourne Borough Women	5–0	Hailsham Town Women	Culver Road	N/A	
2025–26	Three Bridges Women	3–2	Horsham Women	Culver Road	N/A	
