= Abigail Barker =

Woman accused during the Salem witch trials

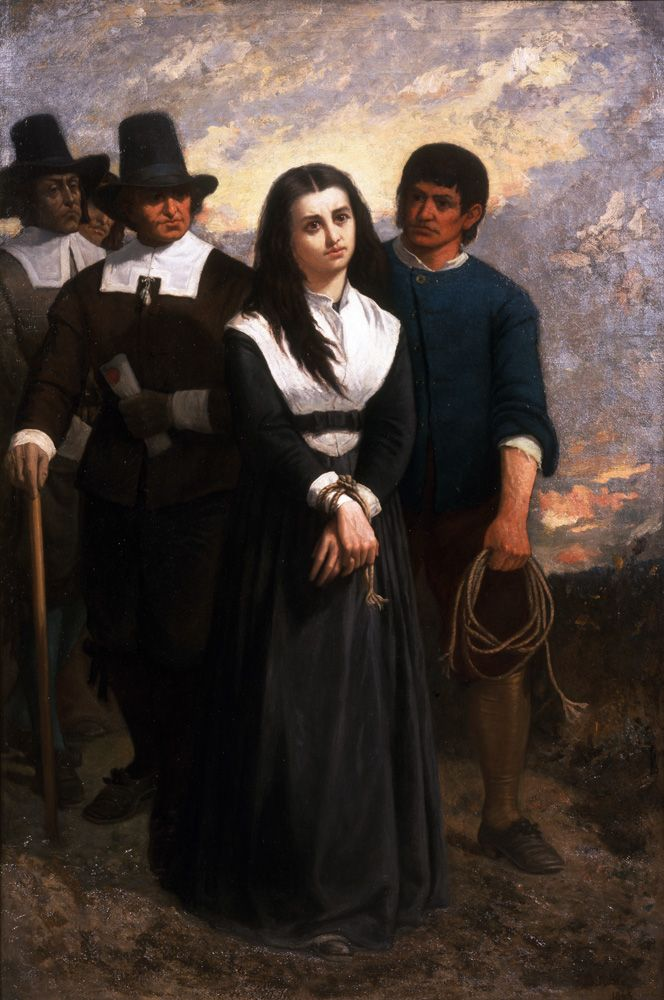
The painting Witch Hill (The Salem Martyr) by Thomas Satterwhite Noble, 1869

Abigail Barker (née Wheeler; 1656 – October 1743) was among those accused of witchcraft during the Salem witch trials of 1692.

== Biography ==
Abigail Wheeler was born in 1656 and resided in Andover, Massachusetts. In May 1686, she married Ebenezer Barker, a carpenter. They had three children.

=== Witch trial ===
A number of Barker's immediate and extended family members were embroiled in the hysteria of the Salem witch trials. In August 1692, Barker's brother-in-law, Daniel Eames, and his mother, Rebecca Blake Eames, both were imprisoned after accusations of witchcraft. In the same month, her husband Ebenezer's brother, William Barker Sr., and his niece, Mary Barker, were also imprisoned for witchcraft. Barker's nephew, William Barker, Jr, was also arrested on September 1.

One week later, on September 8, 1692, Abigail Barker was herself accused of being a witch by Rose Foster. Her husband Ebenezer joined the newly formed Andover resistance and signed petitions in October and December to Governor William Phips and the Superior Court of Judicature.

Barker is mentioned in the petition presented to the Court when it opened on January 3, 1693, which was signed by Dudley Bradstreet, Reverend Dane, Reverend Barnard, and 50 Andover residents. Despite the petition, the Superior Court indicted Abigail of witchcraft.

In a subsequently jury trial on January 6, 1693, Abigail was found not guilty. The 12 jurors included Nathaniel Howard, Reverend John Hale, Samuel Morgan, James Sanders, Richard Gross, John Witt, Nathaniel Emerson, John Emery, Benayah Tidcomb, John Platts, John Lamson, and James Friend. Barker was released, having been imprisoned for 4 1/2 months in Salem.

=== Later life and death ===
After the trial, Abigail went back to her life in Andover and was 87 years old when she died there in 1743. She is buried in the Old North Parish Burying Ground in North Andover.

== Legacy ==
Barker's Farm was established by the Barker family in 1642 and has been run by each subsequent generation of the family, making it one of the oldest continuously owned and operated family farms in the United States.
