= Octavius Freire Owen =

English clergyman and scholar (1816–1873)

Octavius Freire Owen FSA
- Born: 13 March 1816; London
- Died: 16 April 1873 (aged 57); England
- Education: Christ Church, Oxford
- Known for: Creating the English translation of Aristotle's texts
- Spouse: Emily Owen (m. 1843)

Octavius Freire Owen FSA (13 March 1816 – 16 April 1873) was an English scholastic Aristotelian philosopher, translator, and clergyman, rector of Burstow, Surrey; and domestic chaplain to the Duke of Portland.

Owen was married to the English author Emily Owen, with whom he had ten children.

== Early life and education ==
Owen was born 13 March 1816, the eighth son of Henry Butts Owen M.D. in London England, and he was baptised at St. Olave's, Hart Street on 21 August 1816.

He had a bachelor of arts degree from Christ Church, Oxford, graduating in 1839 and he received his master of arts degree on 30 June 1843.

== Career ==
He was ordained as a Deacon by the Bishop of Gloucester in 1840 before becoming a priest on 19 December 1841. In 1843, he moved to Audley, Oxfordshire and then on to St. Mary's vicarage in Leicester before working in Lancaster, Burstow, Winchester, Child's Wickham, and back to Leicester again.

He wrote the Schools of Ancient Philosophy and is best known for his English annotations to Aristotle's Categories, and his un-annotated translation of the other four tractates of the Organon which were published by Bohn in 1853 and 1877. His book Refutation of Spinoza was published by Constible in 1855, and his book The Holy War Versified was published in 1859.

He edited Gay's Fables, published by Routledge in 1854, followed by An Analysis of the Fifth Book of Hookers Ecclesiastical Polity.

In addition to his work as a scholastic aristotelianism and philosopher, Owen was the domestic chaplain to the Duke of Portland.

== Family life ==
He married English author and poet Emily Owen (born 6 February 1822, fourth daughter of William Montague J.P.) on 21 September 1843.

They had five sons and five daughters, including:

1. Theodore Montague Nugent born 14 November 1844, became a vicar and married Sarah Elworthy in 1872. They had nine children.
2. Mary Edith Montague born 24 July 1847, and married Henry Hugh. They had five daughters.
3. Florence Emily Octavia born in Burstow on 11 July 1849.
4. Eustace Clare Lennox born in Burstow on 1 July 1851, and became an architect.
5. Rupert Kenneth Wilson born in Burstow on 3 April 1853, and worked as a clerk for H. M. Civil Service. He married Annie Julia of Gloucester 9 February 1882.
6. Ethel Rose Marie Josephine born 5 April 1855.
7. Angela Vera Zoe Gwendoline born 11 April 1857.
8. Geraldine Anna Violet born 22 January 1862.

== Death ==
He died on 16 April 1873 and was buried in Woking.

== Published works ==
- Categories - annotated
- On Interpretation
- Porphyry, Isagoge, translation by Octavius Freire Owen (1853)

== Bibliography ==
- Works by Owen at Wikisource
- "Owen, Octavius Freire," in Alumni Oxonienses: the Members of the University of Oxford, 1715-1886, by Joseph Foster, London: Parker and Co. (1888–1892) in 4 vols.
