= Emily Owen =

English composer, poet and author

- Born: Emily Montague; 6 February 1822; Gloucester
- Died: 17 June 1885 (aged 63); UK
- Known for: Writing
- Spouse: Octavius Freire Owen

Emily Owen (6 February 1822 — 17 June 1885) was an English composer, poet and writer during the Victorian era.

She was married to Octavius Freire Owen, and published as Mrs. Octavius Freire Owen.

== Personal life ==
Emily Montague was born on 6 February 1822 in Gloucester, the fourth daughter of William Montague of Constitution House.

On 21 September 1843, she married Octavius Freire Owen with whom she had five sons and five daughters, including:

1. Theodore Montague Nugent born 14 November 1844, became a vicar and married Sarah Elworthy in 1872. They had nine children.
2. Mary Edith Montague born 24 July 1847, and married Henry Hugh. They had five daughters, one of whom died.
3. Florence Emily Octavia born in Burstow on 11 July 1849.
4. Eustace Clare Lennox born in Burstow on 1 July 1851, and became an architect.
5. Rupert Kenneth Wilson born in Burstow on 3 April 1853, and worked as a clerk for H. M. Civil Service. He married Annie Julia of Gloucester 9 February 1882.
6. Ethel Rose Marie Josephine born 5 April 1855.
7. Angela Vera Zoe Gwendoline born 11 April 1857.
8. Geraldine Anna Violet born 22 January 1862.

== Writing ==
Owen worked as a writer, poet, and composer. She also edited Home Thoughts a low cost monthly magazine that focused on biographies, essays, poetry, sketches, and stories.

=== Selected publications ===
- The Heroines of History, 1854 (plus multiple editions), Routledge
- The Heroines of Domestic Life, 1861 (plus multiple editions), Routledge
- Snowed Up, 1863
- Spirit of the Holly, 1856, Routledge & Company
- Raised to Peerage: Imperial Revenge, 1859, Hurst and Blackett

An 1862 edition of The Heroines of Domestic Life is held in the permanent collection of The British Museum.

== Death ==
Owen died 17 June 1885, and was buried in Woking.
