= The Saffrons =

Multi-purpose sports ground in Eastbourne, East Sussex

The Saffrons is a multi-purpose sports ground in Eastbourne, East Sussex. The ground is home to Eastbourne Cricket Club, Eastbourne Town Football Club, Eastbourne Hockey Club and Compton Croquet Club. There is also a sand dressed astroturf pitch. The sports ground is located on the edge of Eastbourne town centre, next to the town hall and is in easy reach of local transport links. The ground was first used in 1884. Sussex County Cricket Club played some of their matches there between 1896 and 2000, and recently from 2017.

The complex has:

- A football pitch.
- Two cricket pitches, one of which is named Larkins field.
- An Astroturf Hockey pitch.
- Five Croquet lawns.
- Sports bar and changing facilities.

== Football ==
The Saffrons
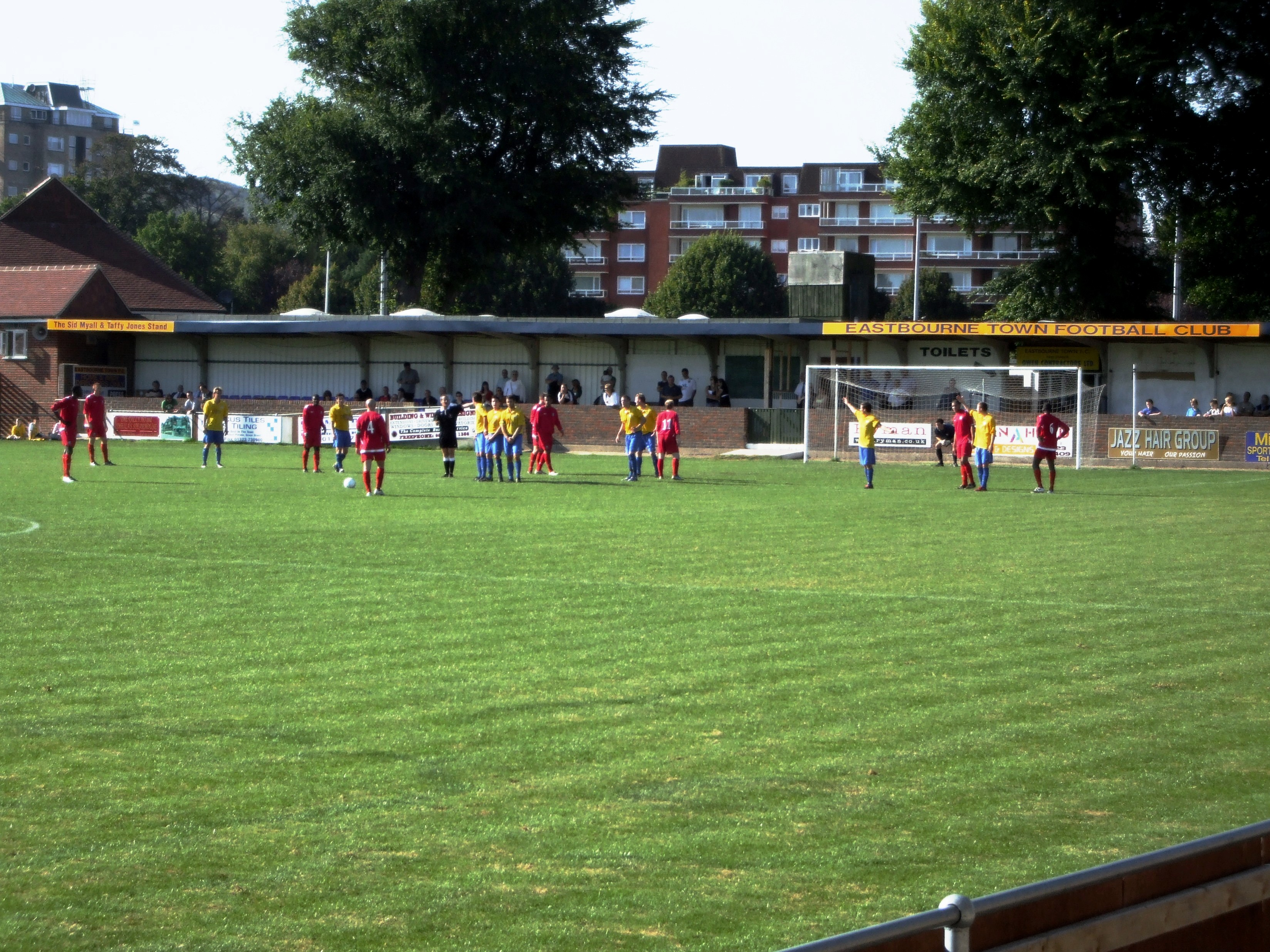
- Sid Myall & Taffy Jones stand from the East Terrace
- Interactive map of The Saffrons
- Full name: The Saffrons Sports Ground
- Location: Compton Place Road, Eastbourne, East Sussex, BN21 1EA
- Coordinates: 50.7661°N 0.2764°E
- Owner: Saffrons Sports Club
- Capacity: 3,000 (200 Seated) for football
- Surface: Grass
- Record attendance: 7,378 (Eastbourne – Hastings United 10 October 1953
- Public transit: Eastbourne

Construction
- Built: 1884
- Opened: 1884

Tenants
- Eastbourne Town F.C. Eastbourne Town W.F.C. Eastbourne Rugby Club: 1886–present 2002–Present; 1892–1934

The Saffrons is home to Eastbourne Town F.C., who play in the Isthmian League South East Division and who have played football here since 1886, when the then Devonshire Park Football Club moved grounds from their former namesake (now the venue for the Eastbourne International tennis tournament). Devonshire Park Football Club changed their name to Eastbourne in 1889 and the 'Town' suffix was added in 1971.

Eastbourne Town Women also play their home games here.

The Larkins Field End, where the clubhouse stands, was originally a wooden grandstand structure, built in the 1930s when attendances at the town club were increasing. The Town Hall side, now known as the East Terrace was asphalted at the same time. The wooden grandstand was destroyed by an arson attack in 1969. The stand was rebuilt but lost its roof in the 1987 hurricane. The current stand today, known as the Taffy Jones/Sid Mayall stand was built in 1994, 25 years after the original grandstand was destroyed.

In 1946, the pitch was moved closer to the cricket ground to lay foundations for the East Terrace, which still remains today. The Meads Road side of the terrace had the covered stand built in 1962. There are wooden benches in this stand.

Floodlights were installed in 1994 and during the 1990s a clubhouse, new dressing rooms and a tea bar have been built behind the stand.

The West Terrace, where the team dugouts are situated once had a movable fence depending on when either the football or the cricket was playing. In recent years the cricket green was moved slightly away to allow a permanent fence and asphalt laid for spectators to stand.

The main turnsite was originally built in 1914 and was destroyed by a fire in February 2004 but restored before the new season started.

The ground plays host to many county cup finals at youth and intermediate level. The capacity of the football ground is 3,000, with seating for 200 spectators.

=== Stands ===
- The Sid Myall & Taffy Jones Stand previously known as the Larkins Field End, has seating for 200 spectators, also the tea bar, hot food hut and toilets. The players changing rooms are also in this stand.
- East Terrace is an open air terrace running for two thirds of the pitch, the other first has a covered terrace, previously sponsored and named the Hopkins Estate agents stand.
- Meads Road End sometimes known as the Bell End due to the close proximity of the Town Hall clock tower, is an open air terrace with a temporary stand borrowed from the cricket pitch for seating.
- West Terrace is an open air stand. The team dugouts are situated along this stand.
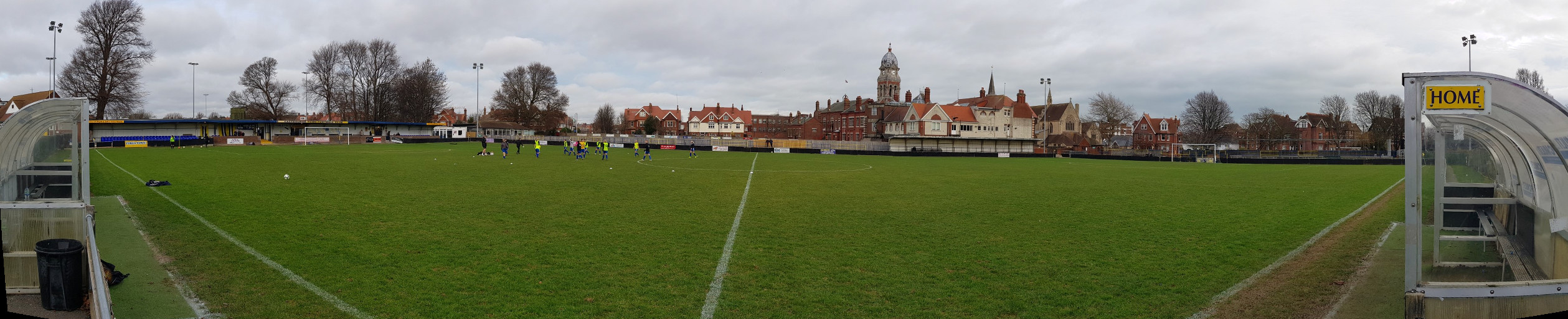
A panorama view of The Saffrons football ground from the West Terrace. Taffy Jones/Sid Myall stand on the left, East Terrace in the middle and Meads Road End on the right. 13 January 2019

=== Other uses ===
As well as being home to Eastbourne Town, the ground has been used as training ground for the England National Football Team in May 1954. And between 1955 and 1957, Manchester City visited Eastbourne and trained at The Saffrons in preparation for the FA Cup finals against Newcastle United (1955) and Birmingham City (1956).

The Saffrons has hosted both amateur and county football events:

- Amateur Football Alliance Senior Cup

1909–1910, 1937–38

- Corinthian League Challenge Shield

1951–52

- Sussex Senior Challenge Cup

1935–36

=== Records ===
The highest attendance to date was 7,378, in a FA Cup qualifying game against Hastings United on 10 October 1953.

== Cricket ==
The Saffrons
- Interactive map of The Saffrons

Ground information
- Location: Eastbourne, East Sussex
- Country: England
- Establishment: 1884
- Capacity: 4,500
- Operator: Eastbourne Cricket Club
- End names
- Larkins End; Sea End

Team information
Eastbourne	(1884? – present)
Sussex	(1896 – 2000; 2017-)
- As of 10 December 2016; Source: Cricinfo

=== Eastbourne Cricket Club ===
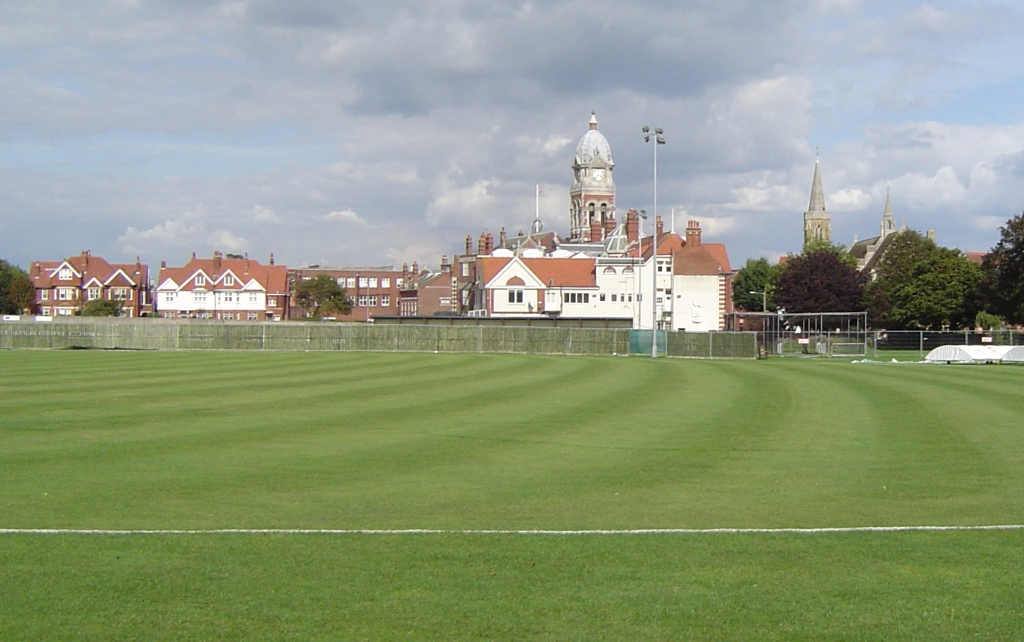
Centre of Eastbourne from the Saffrons

The cricket ground is home to Eastbourne Cricket Club, who play in the Sussex Cricket League. Formed in the 1750s, the club played at various venues in Eastbourne, before moving to the Saffrons. The venue saw its first game of cricket played in 1884.

The ground has also hosted a single Women's One Day International match between England women and New Zealand in the 1973 Women's Cricket World Cup.

There was once a pavilion at one end of the ground which was destroyed by fire in 1947, a replacement was built which was also damaged by fire in 1977.

The ground has a capacity of 4,500.

=== Sussex County Cricket Club ===
The Saffrons hosted 226 first-class matches between 1896 and 2000. Most of these involved Sussex County Cricket Club, but (especially in earlier years) a number of tour and invitational sides played here too. The inaugural first-class match at the Saffrons was played in May 1896, when South of England drew with the touring Australians. The ground hosted 32 List A matches between 1970 and 2000, and one match each of Youth and Women's One-Day Internationals, as well as Sussex Second XI games.

County cricket returned to the Saffrons in May 2017 when Sussex played Gloucestershire in a Royal London One-Day Cup match.

=== Records ===
==== First-class ====
- Highest team total: 676/8 declared by Harlequins v West Indians, 1928
- Lowest team total: 38 by Sussex v Hampshire, 1950
  - Charles Knott returned figures of 7-4-5-5 in this innings
- Highest individual innings: 310 by Harold Gimblett for Somerset v Sussex, 1948
  - The first triple century for Somerset
- Best bowling in an innings: 9-62 by Tony Nicholson for Yorkshire v Sussex, 1967
- Best bowling in a match: 14-84 by Hugh Trumble for Australians v England XI, 1902

==== List A ====
- Highest team total: 262 (48.3 overs) by Sussex v Nottinghamshire, 1993
- Lowest team total: 63 (37.4 overs) by Minor Counties East v Sussex, 1978
- Highest individual innings: 109 by Roger Knight for Sussex v Leicestershire, 1976
- Best bowling in an innings: 5-19 by Mike Buss for Sussex v Minor Counties East, 1978

== Hockey ==
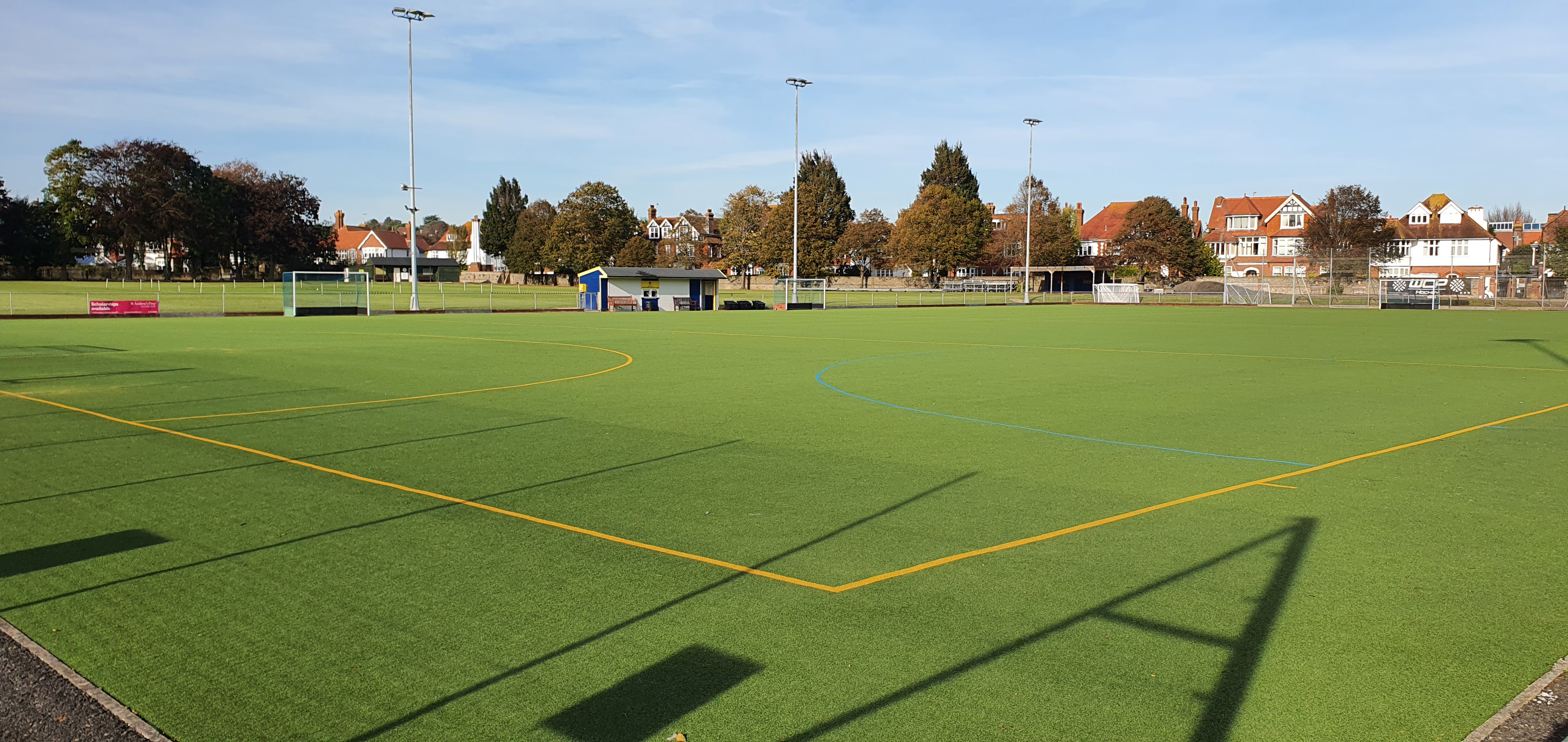
Eastbourne Hockey Club pitch

Eastbourne Hockey Club was founded in 1899 and 2024 will be its 125th year of existence. It moved from Devonshire Park to the Saffrons in the early 1900s. It also hosted one of the last international matches played on grass: England vs Wales in 1970. It has a sand dressed artificial grass pitch behind the Football Ground. Originally built in the 1990s, it was refurbished in 2014.

Eastbourne Hockey Club currently have five men's and four ladies teams, as well as several junior teams.

- Eastbourne Hockey Club Men's 1XI competing in the South East Men's Division 1 East
- Eastbourne Hockey Club Women's 1XI competing in the South East Women's Premier Division

== Rugby ==
Eastbourne Rugby Club played their home games here between 1892 and 1934 using both the football pitch and the field behind, known as Larkins Field. The first recorded game was in December 1892 against Brighton Football Club.

The rugby club used the Saffrons Number 1 pitch on Wednesdays, where Eastbourne Town currently play their games, and other games on Larkins Field, behind the hockey pitch. In the 1894–95 season, the rugby club used "The New Inn", now called Bibendum, the opposite side of the road as their Headquarters and dressing rooms.

In 1934 the rugby club moved to their present home in Hampden Park. Larkins Field is now a spare cricket pitch for local teams in the area.
