= James Friend House =

Historic house in Massachusetts, United States

- U.S. National Register of Historic Places
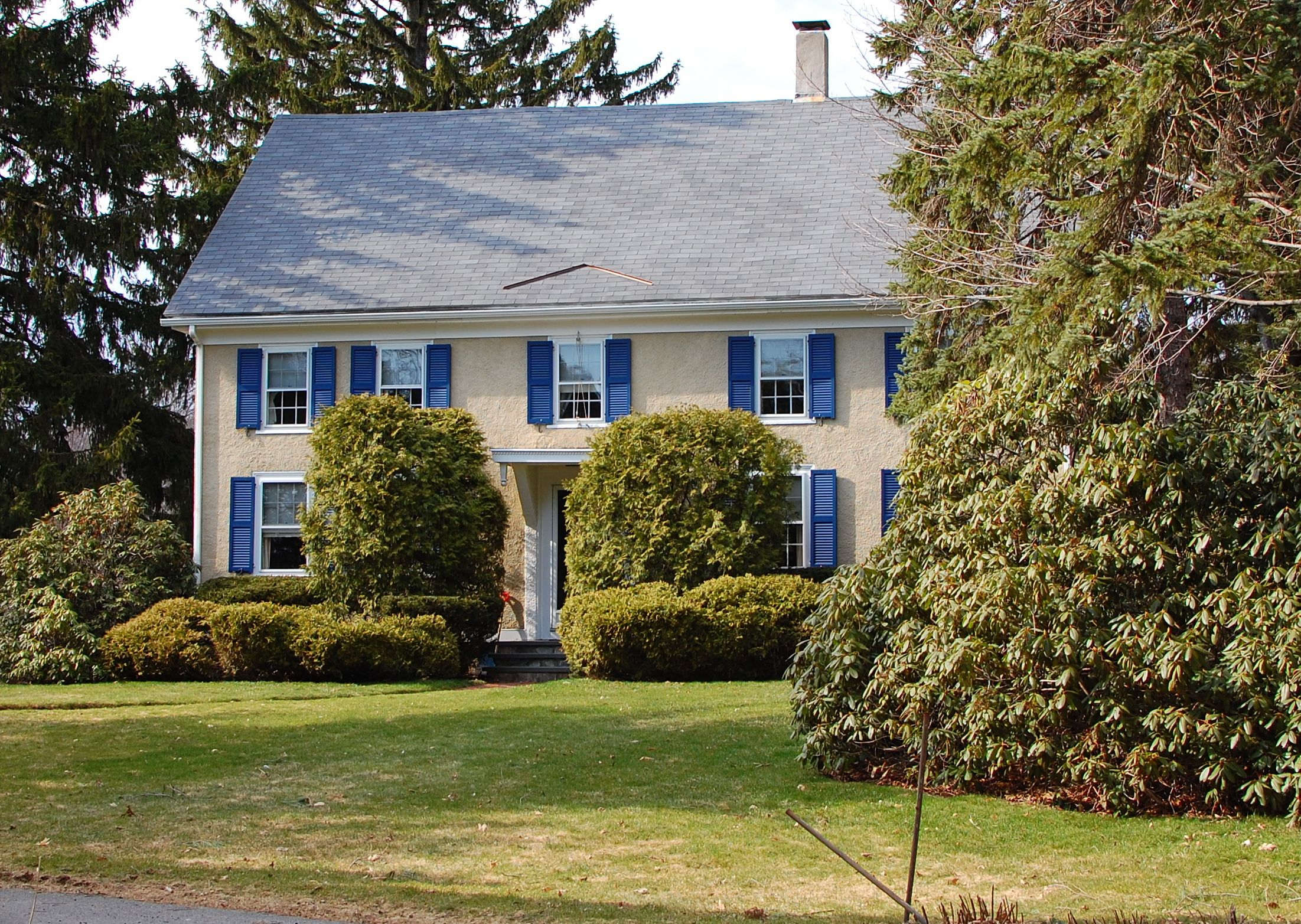
- James Friend House, 114 Cedar Street in Wenham

- Location within Massachusetts Location within the United States
- Location: 114 Cedar Street, Wenham, Massachusetts
- Coordinates: 42°35′46″N 70°54′23″W
- Built: 1697
- Architectural style: Colonial
- MPS: First Period Buildings of Eastern Massachusetts TR
- NRHP reference No.: 90000268
- Added to NRHP: March 9, 1990

The James Friend House is a historic First Period house in Wenham, Massachusetts, United States. It was built by James Friend, a local carpenter, probably not long after he received a grant in 1699 to cut timber on public land. The house is a 2.5-story wood-frame house with a center chimney. Its main facade is a slightly asymmetrical five bays wide, even though it was apparently originally built to that plan rather than in stages. A lean-to was added to the back of the house sometime before 1738, giving the house a saltbox appearance. This section was raised to a full two stories in the 19th century, and the roof was rebuilt. In the early 20th century, the house was moved back from the road and covered in stucco.

The house was listed on the National Register of Historic Places in 1990.

== See also ==
- List of the oldest buildings in Massachusetts
- National Register of Historic Places listings in Essex County, Massachusetts
