= London and South East Women's Regional Football League =

- Founded: 2005
- Country: England
- Divisions: 3
- Number of clubs: 32
- Level on pyramid: 5-6
- Promotion to: FA Women's National League Division 1 South East
- Relegation to: Greater London Women's Football League Premier Division; South East Counties Women's League Premier Division; Sussex County Women and Girls Football League Premier Division
- Current champions: Fulham (2024–25)
- Website: Official website

The London and South East Women's Regional Football League is at the fifth level of the English women's football pyramid, with the seven other Regional Leagues – Eastern, Southern, South West, West Mids, East Mids, North East and North West. The London and South East Women's Regional Football League feeds directly into the FA Women's National League Division One South East, and lies above the Greater London Women's Football League and South East Counties Women's League in the pyramid. The pyramid structure was founded in 1998.

== History ==
The London and South East Regional Women's Football League was established in 2005 and consisted of just one division, Premier Division. The league expanded to include Division 1 North and South leagues, which sit at the six tier, which started for the 2020–21 division.

== Teams ==
Map showing the locations of the teams in the London and South East Women's Regional Football League
– Premier Division - Division 1 North - Division 1 South

The teams competing in the London and South East Women's Regional League during the 2025–26 season are:

Premier Division

Club	Home ground	Capacity
Ashford Town (Middlesex)	Robert Parker Stadium	2,550
Aylesford	Aylesford Recreation Ground	1,000
Barking	Mayesbrook Park	2,500
Brentford	Honeycroft	3,770
Dartford	Princes Park	4,100
Dorking Wanderers	Meadowbank	2,000
Ebbsfleet United	Stonebridge Road	5,011
Millwall Lionesses	St. Paul's Sports Stadium	1,000
Newhaven	Fort Road Recreation Ground	1,000
Saltdean United	Hill Park	1,000
Sport London e Benfica	Rectory Park	1,000
Sutton United	Gander Green Lane	7,032

Division One North

Club	Home ground	Capacity
Actonians Reserves	Gunnersbury Park	
AFC Greenwich Borough	Baldon Sports Ground	
Ashford United (Kent)	Green Box Stadium	3,200
Bromley	Hayes Lane	5,000
Camden Town	Maurice Rebak Stadium	1,500
Clapton Community	The Old Spotted Dog Ground	2,500
Dulwich Hamlet Reserves	The Edward Alleyn Club	1,000
Hackney	Hackney Marshes	1,000
Hammersmith FC	Gunnersbury Park Sports Hub	
Herne Bay	The Crest Stadium	3,000
Richmond & Kew	Ham Playing Fields	1,000
Soccer Elite Football Academy	Star Meadow Sports Club	1,000

Division One South

Club	Home ground	Capacity
Ashmount Leigh	Meadowbank Football Ground	3,000
Bexhill United	Bexhill College Sports Centre	
Bognor Regis Town	MKM Arena	4,500
Eastbourne Borough	Priory Lane	3,622
Frimley Green	Frimley Green Recreation Ground	2,000
Hastings United	The Pilot Field	4,050
Haywards Heath Town	Hanbury Park Stadium	2,000
Leatherhead	Tithe Farm	3,000
Montpelier Villa	Culver Road	2,000
Saltdean United Development	Hill Park	1,000
Sevenoaks Town	Greatness Recreation Ground	1,150
Steyning Town Community	The Shooting Field	2,000

== Champions ==
=== 2005–2020 ===
Season	Champions
2005–2006	Whitehawk
2006–2007	Lewes
2007–2008	Tottenham Hotspur
2008–2009	Ebbsfleet United
2009–2010	Old Actonians
2010–2011	Tooting & Mitcham
2011–2012	Chichester City
2012–2013	Denham United
2013–2014	Crystal Palace
2014–2015	Old Actonians
2015–2016	AFC Wimbledon
2016–2017	Leyton Orient
2017–2018	Crawley Wasps
2018–2019	Kent Football United
2019–2020	League abandoned

=== 2020–present ===
The league expanded to include new Division 1 North and Division South.

Season	Premier	Division 1 North	Division 1 South
2020–2021	Season abandoned		
2021–2022	Ashford Town (Middlesex)	Sutton United	AFC Acorns
2022–2023	Worthing	Dorking Wanderers	Ashford United
2023–2024	Dulwich Hamlet	Sport London e Benfica	Newhaven
2024–2025	Fulham	Brentford	Aylesford
