= Freya Holdaway =

Northern Ireland footballer

Personal information
- Date of birth: 12 April 1989 (age 37)
- Place of birth: Basildon, England
- Height: 5 ft 6 in (1.68 m)
- Position: Defender

Youth career
- Arsenal

College career
Years	Team	Apps	(Gls)
2008–2011	Marshall University		

Senior career*
Years	Team	Apps	(Gls)
2014–2020	Crystal Palace	63	(3)

International career^{‡}
2018–2019	Northern Ireland	12	(0)
- * Club domestic league appearances and goals as of 20:40, 4 September 2019 (UTC) ‡ National team caps and goals as of 19:46, 30 August 2019 (UTC)

Freya Holdaway (born 12 April 1989) is a Northern Irish former footballer who played as a defender and appeared for the Northern Ireland women's national team.

== Career ==
Holdaway has been capped for the Northern Ireland national team, appearing for the team during the 2019 FIFA Women's World Cup qualifying cycle.

She had to retire from football in 2020 after three concussions.
