= Brentford Women F.C. =

Brentford Women's FC
- Nickname: The Bees
- Founded: 1990
- Ground: Honeycroft, Yiewsley
- Owner: Matthew Benham
- Chairman: Roger Crook
- Manager: Carly Williams
- League: London and South East Women's Regional Football League
- 2025–26: 3rd of 12
- Website: brentfordfc.com/womens

Brentford Women's Football Club is an English women's football club based in West London, that plays in the London and South East Women's Regional Football League. They are affiliated with the men's team Brentford FC. Brentford Women play at Uxbridge FCs Honeycroft ground, in Yiewsley.

== History ==
Brentford Women was founded by Roger Crook as an under-14s team in July 1990 when his daughter needed somewhere to compete. After playing in various local youth leagues they merged with SmithKline Beecham to form the senior team Brentford Beechams, who played in the Greater London Women's Football League. In 2005–06 the team merged again, this time with Viking Ladies.

In the 2022–23 season, Brentford Women broke the record for a tier six women's game with an attendance of 5,116 at the Gtech Community Stadium, against Watford on 13 November 2022.

On 4th May 2025, on their penultimate game of the 2024–25 season, Brentford Women won the London & South East Regional Women's Division 1 North, winning the first 21 games of their 22-game season.

On 7 May 2026, Brentford announced that the women's team would play all of their 2026–27 season home fixtures at Uxbridge F.C., a move away from Bedfont Sports Club. This announcement came alongside the news that from the start of the 2026–27 season, Brentford were launching a girls' Academy.

== First Team ==
The first team was managed by Karleigh Osborne from 2018 until the end of the 2024–25 season, during which he led Brentford Women to the LSE Division One North title and promotion to tier five. Osborne stepped down ahead of the 2025–26 campaign. On 13th August 2025, Carly Williams was appointed as Brentford Women's new head coach ahead of the 2025–26 season, overseeing a 5-0 pre-season win on the day of her appointment.

== Squad ==
Squad for 2026/27 season. Note: Flags indicate national team as defined under FIFA eligibility rules; some limited exceptions apply. Players may hold more than one non-FIFA nationality.

No.	Pos.	Nation	Player
1	GK	ENG	Saskia Reeves-Priestley
2	DF	ENG	Maddie Phillips
3	DF	ENG	Becca Teale
4	DF	ENG	Lucy Potter
5	DF	WAL	Rhian Cleverly
6	FW	ENG	Ilana Harris-Walters
7	MF	ENG	Georgie Giddings
8	MF	ENG	Asees Sangha
9	FW	POL	Wiktoria Kiszkis
11	FW	ENG	Renai McCrea
14	MF	WAL	Ellie Thomas-Leek

No.	Pos.	Nation	Player
15	FW	IRL	Abbi Smith
16	FW	ENG	Ashley Cheatley
17	MF	FRA	Maï Louvrier
18	MF	ENG	Katie Gilligan
19	DF	ENG	Makeba Black
20	MF	ENG	Freya Worsley
22	GK	ENG	Mya Francis-Pownall
23	FW	ENG	Chelsie Berry
24	DF	ENG	Imogen Cochrane
25	FW	ENG	Millie Constantine

== B Team ==
The B Team played in the Greater London Women's Football League Division One South. The head coach was Tommy Ryan-Maynard, and Assistant Head Coach was former player Charlotte Tanner.

As part of the announcement about the girls' Academy launch, it was announced on 7 May 2026 that the B Team would cease to exist from the end of the 2025–26 season. The B-Team won their league during the 2025–26 season.

== External Sources ==
- Brentford Women FC News
- Brentford Women FC Instagram
