= South East Counties Women's League =

- Founded: 1990
- Country: England
- Divisions: 10 (current season)
- Number of clubs: 80 (current season)
- Level on pyramid: 7–9
- Promotion to: London and South East Women's Regional Football League
- Website: Official website

The South East Counties Women's League is an association football league in England. The competition covers the counties of Kent, Surrey, and Sussex. Founded by the Women's Football Association in 1990 from the Sussex Martlet Women's League with around 20 clubs, the South East Counties Women's League became part of the pyramid structure in 1998 following the founding of the South East Combination Women's Football League.

The league is at levels 7 to 9 of the women's pyramid. It promotes to the London and South East Women's Regional Football League, and does not relegate to any league.

Between the seasons 1998–99 and 2009–10, the South East Counties Premier Division sat at level 5 in the pyramid, and at level 6 between seasons 2010–11 and 2019–20. The Premier Division appeared to be discontinued in 2020–21 and replaced at level 6 by extra divisions in the London and South East League, Division 1 North and South.

Before the beginning of the 2023–24 season, the Premier Division was split into a Premier Division (covering all counties except Surrey) and a Surrey Premier Division. The lower division were then further split for the 2024-25 season into two Kent Division 1 leagues (East and West), and four Kent Division 2 leagues (East, Mid East, West and Mid West), with Surrey Division 1 split into Surrey Division 1 North and Surrey Division 1 South.

== Teams ==
The teams competing during the 2024–25 season were:

Premier Division; Cray Wanderers; Kings Hill; London Road; Maidstone United; Margate; Parkwood Rangers; Sevenoaks Town; Tonbridge Angels; Tunbridge Wells Foresters; Woodcombe Sports
Kent Division 1 East; Baypoint; Betteshanger Welfare; Biddenden; Deal Town; Faversham Strike Force; Hollands and Blair; Margate Youth Development; Park Regis; Sheppey United		Kent Division 1 West; Aylesford Seconds; Bromleians; Danson Sports; Glebe; Gravesham; Long Lane; Petts Wood; Tunbridge Wells Foresters 2nd	
Kent Division 2 East; Baypoint Seconds; Betteshanger Welfare Development; Folkestone Invicta; Canterbury Eagles; Hawkinge Town; Lydd Town; Mersham Sports Club; Ramsgate; Sellindge Development	Kent Division 2 Mid East; Canterbury Eagles; Faversham Town; Herne Bay Development; Maidstone United Development; Sittingbourne; Staplehurst Monarchs United; The Plough Whitstable; Woodcoombe Sports Development	Kent Division 2 West; Crayford Arrows; Foots Cray Lionesses; Idle Hill; Junior Reds Roses; Old Pepys; Orpington; Sevenoaks Town Development	Kent Division 2 Mid West Barming; Borough Green; Guru Nanak; Hollands And Blair Reserves; Larkfield; New Ash Green; Tunbridge Wells Foresters Third XI

Surrey Premier Division Beecholme Belles; Carshalton Athletic; Croydon; Dorking Wanderers Development; Epsom & Ewell; Farnham Town; Leatherhead Youth; Old Tiffinians; Sutton United Reserves
Surrey Division One North Egham Town; Hersham; Manorcroft United; Molesey Athletic; Walton & Hersham	Surrey Division One South Ash United; Cranleigh; Guildford City; Guildford Saints; Milford & Witley; Oxted & District; South Park (Reigate)
