= 2016 Manchester City W.F.C. season =

Manchester City Women
2016 season
- Chairman: Khaldoon Mubarak
- Manager: Nick Cushing
- Stadium: Academy Stadium
- Women's Super League: Winners
- FA Cup: Semifinals
- WSL Cup: Winners
- Champions League: Round of 16
Home colours	Away colours

The 2016 season is Manchester City Women's Football Club's 28th season of competitive football and its third season in the FA Women's Super League and at the top level of English women's football, having been promoted from the FA Women's Premier League before the 2014 season. This season will also be the first occasion on which City Women contest a European competition, having qualified through their runners-up finish in the 2015 Women's Super League.

== Non-competitive ==
=== Pre-season ===
==== Friendly ====
7 February 2016 Friendly	Manchester City (England)	3–1	(Sweden) FC Rosengård	Manchester
13:00 GMT	Christiansen 22'; Duggan 47'; Houghton 70'	Report	Houghton 57' (o.g.)	Stadium: Academy Stadium; Attendance: 1,027; Referee: Nick Gibbons

==== Fatima Bint Mubarak Ladies Sports Academy Challenge ====
17 February 2016 Friendly	Manchester City (England)	3–0	(Australia) Melbourne City	Abu Dhabi
18:00 GST	Houghton 34', 75'; Christiansen 50'	Report		Stadium: New York University Abu Dhabi; Attendance: 500

==== Friendly ====
25 February 2016 Friendly	Manchester City (England)	2–1	(Sweden) Piteå IF	Manchester
13:00 GMT	Duggan 23'; Asllani 42'	Report	Norlin 54'	Stadium: Academy Stadium

== Competitions ==
=== League table ===
Pos	Team	Pld	W	D	L	GF	GA	GD	Pts	Qualification or relegation
1	Manchester City (C)	16	13	3	0	36	4	+32	42	Qualification for the Champions League knockout phase
2	Chelsea	16	12	1	3	42	17	+25	37	Qualification for the Champions League knockout phase
3	Arsenal	16	10	2	4	33	14	+19	32	
4	Birmingham City	16	7	6	3	18	13	+5	27	
5	Liverpool	16	7	4	5	27	23	+4	25	

Source: FA WSL
Rules for classification: 1) Points; 2) Goal difference; 3) Number of goals scored
(C) Champions

==== Results summary ====
Overall								Home						Away					
Pld	W	D	L	GF	GA	GD	Pts	W	D	L	GF	GA	GD	W	D	L	GF	GA	GD
16	13	3	0	36	4	+32	42	6	2	0	18	2	+16	7	1	0	18	2	+16

Last updated: 17 October 2016.
Source: FA WSL

==== Results by matchday ====
Matchday	1	2	3	4	5	6	7	8	9	10	11	12	13	14	15	16
Ground	H	H	A	A	H	A	A	H	A	H	A	A	H	A	H	H
Result	W	W	W	W	W	W	D	D	W	W	W	W	W	W	W	D
Position	3	1	1	1	1	1	1	1	1	1	1	1	1	1	1	1

Updated to match(es) played on 17 October 2016. Source: FA WSL
A = Away; H = Home; W = Win; D = Draw; L = Loss

==== Matches ====
23 March 2016 1	Manchester City	1–0	Notts County	Manchester
19:00 GMT	Houghton 90+4'	Report		Stadium: Academy Stadium; Attendance: 1,173; Referee: Joseph Johnson

28 March 2016 2	Manchester City	2–0	Arsenal	Manchester
15:00 BST	Ross 65'; Duggan 78' (pen.)	Report	Rose (red card) 12'	Stadium: Academy Stadium; Attendance: 1,914; Referee: Michael Salisbury

24 April 2016 3	Birmingham City	0–2	Manchester City	Solihull
14:00 BST		Report	Corboz 35'; Ross 90+5'	Stadium: Damson Park; Attendance: 956; Referee: Simon Barrow

29 April 2016 4	Sunderland	0–2	Manchester City	Hetton-le-Hole
19:45 BST		Report	Parris 40'; Duggan 75'	Stadium: The Hetton Centre; Attendance: 1,411; Referee: Rebecca Welch

2 May 2016 5	Manchester City	6–0	Doncaster Rovers Belles	Manchester
14:00 BST	Bronze 7'; Scott 10'; Ross 40'; Beattie 44'; Asllani 45'; Duggan 74'	Report		Stadium: Academy Stadium; Attendance: 2,227; Referee: Lindsey Robinson

19 May 2016 6	Chelsea	0–2	Manchester City	Staines
19:30 BST		Report	Stokes 44'; Beattie 48'	Stadium: Wheatsheaf Park; Attendance: 1,518; Referee: Nigel Lugg

25 May 2016 7	Liverpool	0–0	Manchester City	Widnes
18:30 BST		Report		Stadium: Halton Stadium; Attendance: 936; Referee: M Woods

26 June 2016 8	Manchester City	1–1	Liverpool	Manchester
14:00 BST	Ross 66'	Report	White 4'	Stadium: Academy Stadium; Attendance: 2,172; Referee: Matthew Donohue

24 July 2016 9	Notts County	1–5	Manchester City	Nottingham
16:00 BST	Clarke 48'	Report	Ross 5', 41'; Scott 25'; Stanway 45'; Christiansen 75'	Stadium: Meadow Lane; Attendance: 1,627; Referee: Rebecca Welch

31 July 2016 10	Manchester City	3–0	Sunderland	Manchester
14:00 BST	Stanway 17', 55', 82'	Report		Stadium: Academy Stadium; Attendance: 2,026; Referee: David McNamara

3 August 2016 11	Reading	1–2	Manchester City	High Wycombe
19:45 BST	Bruton 89'	Report	Christiansen 38'; Duggan 80'	Stadium: Adams Park; Attendance: 592

11 August 2016 12	Doncaster Rovers Belles	0–4	Manchester City	Doncaster
18:45 BST		Report	Ross 1'; Christiansen 15'; Bronze 63'; Corboz 89'	Stadium: Keepmoat Stadium; Attendance: 740; Referee: Antony Tankard

28 August 2016 13	Manchester City	2–0	Reading	Manchester
11:15 BST	Beattie 48'; Houghton 87'	Report		Stadium: Academy Stadium; Attendance: 1,950; Referee: Michael Denton

11 September 2016 14	Arsenal	0–1	Manchester City	Borehamwood
14:00 BST		Report	Ross 50'	Stadium: Meadow Park; Referee: Colin Lymer

25 September 2016 15	Manchester City	2–0	Chelsea	Manchester
14:00 BST	Scott 34'; Duggan 50' (pen.)	Report		Stadium: Academy Stadium; Attendance: 4,096; Referee: Sarah Garratt

30 October 2016 16	Manchester City	1–1	Birmingham City	Manchester
14:00 GMT				Stadium: Academy Stadium

=== FA Cup ===
19 March 2016 Fifth round	Liverpool	0–2	Manchester City	Widnes
17:30 GMT		Report	Stanway 30'; Parris 64'	Stadium: Halton Stadium; Attendance: 743; Referee: P Gibbons

3 April 2016 Sixth round	Manchester City	2–0	Sporting Club Albion	Manchester
14:00 GMT	Parris 7'; Ross 22'	Report		Stadium: Academy Stadium; Attendance: 1,270; Referee: Peter Gooch

17 April 2016 Semi-final	Chelsea	2–1	Manchester City	Staines
14:00 GMT	So-yun 85'; Kirby 120'	Report	Ross 72'	Stadium: Wheatsheaf Park; Attendance: 2,278; Referee: Sam Purkiss

=== WSL Cup ===
2 July 2016 First round	Aston Villa	0–8	Manchester City	Sutton Coldfield
19:00 BST		Report	Parris 9', 18', 59'; Ross 17', 90'; Middag 32'; Corboz 79'; Scott 90'	Stadium: Central Ground; Attendance: 492; Referee: Sarah Garrett

7 August 2016 Second round	Manchester City	4–1	Doncaster Rovers Belles	Manchester
14:00 BST	Christiansen 38'; Stanway 76'; Duggan 82'; Ross 88'	Report	Mathews 80'	Stadium: Academy Stadium; Attendance: 1,153; Referee: Anthony Backhouse

4 September 2016 Semi-finals	Manchester City	1–0	Arsenal	Manchester
14:00 BST	Beattie 79'	Report		Stadium: Academy Stadium; Attendance: 1,643

2 October 2016 Final	Manchester City	1–0	Birmingham City	Manchester
16:00 BST	Bronze 104'	Report		Stadium: Academy Stadium; Attendance: 4,214; Referee: Rebecca Welch

=== Champions League ===
==== Round of 32 ====
6 October 2016 First leg	Manchester City (England)	2–0	(Russia) Zvezda Perm	Manchester
19:00 GMT	Scott 34'; Bronze 90'	Report		Stadium: Academy Stadium; Referee: Monika Mularczyk

12 October 2016 Second leg	Zvezda Perm (Russia)	0–4	(England) Manchester City	Perm
15:00 GMT		Report	Beattie 22', 53'; Bronze 32'; Christiansen 74'	Stadium: Zvezda Stadium; Referee: Riem Hussein

==== Round of 16 ====
9 November 2016 First leg	Manchester City (England)	1–0	(Denmark) Brøndby	Manchester
19:00 GMT				Stadium: Academy Stadium

16 November 2016 Second leg	Brøndby (Denmark)	1–1	(England) Manchester City	Brøndby
17:00 GMT				Stadium: Brøndby Stadium

Campaign continued in the following season

== Squad information ==
=== Playing statistics ===
As of 17 October 2016

Appearances (Apps.) numbers are for appearances in competitive games only including sub appearances
Red card numbers denote: Numbers in parentheses represent red cards overturned for wrongful dismissal.

No.	Nat.	Player	Pos.	WSL				FA Cup				WSL Cup				Champions League				Total			
No.	Nat.	Player	Pos.	Apps	Goal	Booked	Sent off (straight red)	Apps	Goal	Booked	Sent off (straight red)	Apps	Goal	Booked	Sent off (straight red)	Apps	Goal	Booked	Sent off (straight red)	Apps	Goal	Booked	Sent off (straight red)
1	(England)	Karen Bardsley	GK	15				2								2				19			
2	(England)	Lucy Bronze	DF	15	2			3		1		4	1			2	2			24	5	1	
3	(England)	Demi Stokes	DF	15	1			3				4				2				24	1		
4	(Netherlands)	Tessel Middag	MF	7								3	1			2				12	1		
5	(Scotland)	Jen Beattie	DF	11	3							4	1			2	2			17	6		
6	(England)	Steph Houghton	DF	15	2	1		3				4				2				24	2	1	
7	(Sweden)	Kosovare Asllani	FW	10	1			3				2				2				17	1		
8	(England)	Jill Scott	MF	14	3			2				3	1			2	1			21	5		
9	(England)	Toni Duggan	FW	14	5			2				3	1			2				21	6		
10	(United States)	Daphne Corboz	MF	13	2			3				3	1			1				20	3		
11	(England)	Isobel Christiansen	MF	9	3			1				3	1			2	1			15	5		
12	(England)	Georgia Stanway	FW	7	4			3	1			1	1							11	6		
16	(Scotland)	Jane Ross	FW	15	8			3	2			4	3			2				24	13		
17	(England)	Nikita Parris	FW	14	1			3	2			4	3			2				23	6		
18	(England)	Ella Toone	FW									1								1			
20	(Republic of Ireland)	Megan Campbell	DF	3								1								4			
21	(England)	Marie Hourihan	GK					1				4								5			
23	(England)	Abbie McManus	DF	9		1		3												12		1	
24	(England)	Keira Walsh	MF	7								4				2				13			
	(England)	Amelia Kemp	DF					1												1			
	(England)	Alethea Paul	MF					1												1			
	(England)	Zoe Tynan	MF					1												1			
	(England)	Ellie Roebuck	GK	1																1			
Own goals					0				0				0				0				0		
Totals					35	2	0		5	1	0		14	0	0		6	0	0		60	3	0

=== Goalscorers ===
Includes all competitive matches. The list is sorted alphabetically by surname when total goals are equal.

Correct as of 17 October 2016

No.	Nat.	Player	Pos.	WSL	FA Cup	WSL Cup	Champions League	Total
16	(Scotland)	Jane Ross	FW	8	2	3	0	13
5	(Scotland)	Jen Beattie	FW	3	0	1	2	6
9	(England)	Toni Duggan	FW	5	0	1	0	6
17	(England)	Nikita Parris	FW	1	2	3	0	6
12	(England)	Georgia Stanway	FW	4	1	1	0	6
2	(England)	Lucy Bronze	DF	2	0	1	2	5
11	(England)	Isobel Christiansen	MF	3	0	1	1	5
8	(England)	Jill Scott	MF	3	0	1	1	5
10	(United States)	Daphne Corboz	MF	2	0	1	0	3
6	(England)	Steph Houghton	DF	2	0	0	0	2
7	(Sweden)	Kosovare Asllani	FW	1	0	0	0	1
4	(Netherlands)	Tessel Middag	MF	0	0	1	0	1
3	(England)	Demi Stokes	DF	1	0	0	0	1
Own goals				0	0	0	0	0
Total				35	5	14	6	60

== Transfers and loans ==
=== Transfers in ===
Date	Position	No.	Player	From club
11 November 2015	FW	16	(Scotland) Jane Ross	(Sweden) Vittsjö GIK
30 December 2015	GK	21	(England) Marie Hourihan	(England) Chelsea
22 January 2016	FW	7	(Sweden) Kosovare Asllani	(France) Paris Saint-Germain
15 February 2016	DF	20	(Republic of Ireland) Megan Campbell	(United States) Florida State Seminoles
3 June 2016	MF	4	(Netherlands) Tessel Middag	(Netherlands) AFC Ajax

=== Transfers out ===
Date	Position	No.	Player	To club
20 October 2015	FW	7	(England) Krystle Johnston	(England) Everton
20 October 2015	DF	16	(England) Emma Lipman	(England) Sheffield
20 October 2015	MF	19	(England) Natasha Flint	Released
20 October 2015	DF	33	(Germany) Kathleen Radtke	(Germany) MSV Duisburg (women)
24 January 2016	MF	40	(Wales) Natasha Harding	(England) Liverpool
14 February 2016	DF	20	(England) Georgia Brougham	(England) Everton
2016	DF	15	(England) Chelsea Nightingale	Released

=== Loans out ===
Start date	End date	Position	No.	Player	To club
25 January 2016	31 October 2016	GK	13	(England) Alexandra Brooks	(England) Everton
