= 2015 Manchester City W.F.C. season =

Manchester City Women
2015 season
- Chairman: Khaldoon Mubarak
- Manager: Nick Cushing
- Stadium: Academy Stadium
- Women's Super League: 2nd
- FA Cup: Semi-finals
- WSL Cup: Quarter-finals
- Top goalscorer: League: Duggan/Christiansen (both 6 goals); All: Duggan (12 goals)
- Highest home attendance: 3,180 v Notts County (4 October 2015)
- Lowest home attendance: 450 v Birmingham City (12 April 2015)
Home colours	Away colours

The 2015 season is Manchester City Women's Football Club's 27th season of competitive football and its second season in the FA Women's Super League and at the top level of English women's football, having been promoted from the FA Women's Premier League before the 2014 season.

== Non-competitive ==
=== Pre-season ===
21 February 2015 Friendly	Manchester City (England)	5–0	(England) Aston Villa	Manchester
14:00 GMT	Parris 15', 79'; Christiansen 39'; Flint 43'; Beattie 87'	Report		Stadium: Academy Stadium; Attendance: 762; Referee: Mark Reeves

== Competitions ==
=== League table ===
Pos	Team	Pld	W	D	L	GF	GA	GD	Pts	Qualification or relegation
1	Chelsea (C)	14	10	2	2	30	10	+20	32	Qualification for the Champions League knockout phase
2	Manchester City	14	9	3	2	25	11	+14	30	Qualification for the Champions League knockout phase
3	Arsenal	14	8	3	3	21	13	+8	27	
4	Sunderland	14	6	2	6	24	24	0	20	
5	Notts County	14	4	3	7	20	20	0	15	

Source: FA WSL
Rules for classification: 1) Points; 2) Goal difference; 3) Number of goals scored
(C) Champions

==== Results summary ====
Overall								Home						Away					
Pld	W	D	L	GF	GA	GD	Pts	W	D	L	GF	GA	GD	W	D	L	GF	GA	GD
14	9	3	2	25	11	+14	30	5	1	1	13	4	+9	4	2	1	12	7	+5

Last updated: 4 October 2015.
Source: FA WSL

==== Results by matchday ====
Matchday	1	2	3	4	5	6	7	8	9	10	11	12	13	14
Ground	A	A	H	A	H	H	A	A	A	A	H	H	H	H
Result	D	W	L	L	D	W	W	W	W	D	W	W	W	W
Position	4	2	4	6	6	5	5	5	4	3	2	2	2	2

Updated to match(es) played on 4 October 2015. Source: FA WSL
A = Away; H = Home; W = Win; D = Draw; L = Loss

==== Matches ====
29 March 2015 1	Birmingham City	0–0	Manchester City	Solihull
14:00 GMT	Ayisi (red card) 45'	Report		Stadium: Damson Park; Attendance: 767

1 April 2015 2	Sunderland	0–1	Manchester City	Hetton-le-Hole
18:30 GMT		Report	Parris 21'	Stadium: The Hetton Centre; Attendance: 1,433; Referee: Lucy May

19 April 2015 3	Manchester City	0–1	Arsenal	Manchester
16:00 GMT	Scott (red card) 56'	Report	Ubogagu 36'	Stadium: Academy Stadium; Attendance: 1,167; Referee: Martyn Rawcliffe

26 April 2015 4	Liverpool	2–1	Manchester City	Widnes
18:00 GMT	Oshoala 10'; Smorgard 57'	Report	Parris 53'	Stadium: Halton Stadium; Attendance: 1,022; Referee: J Hunt

10 May 2015 5	Manchester City	1–1	Chelsea	Manchester
14:00 GMT	Duggan 37'		Aluko 22'	Stadium: Academy Stadium; Attendance: 750; Referee: Robert Jones

12 July 2015 6	Manchester City	1–0	Birmingham City	Manchester
14:00 GMT	Duggan	Report		Stadium: Academy Stadium; Attendance: 2,102; Referee: Aaron Jackson

18 July 2015 7	Bristol Academy	0–3	Manchester City	Filton
18:30 GMT		Report	Duggan 29', 69'; Corboz 82'	Stadium: Stoke Gifford Stadium; Attendance: 946; Referee: Adrian Quelch

26 July 2015 8	Chelsea	1–2	Manchester City	Staines
14:00 GMT	Aluko 48'	Report	Duggan 12'; Rafferty 86' (o.g.)	Stadium: Wheatsheaf Park; Attendance: 1,857

9 August 2015 9	Arsenal	2–3	Manchester City	Borehamwood
14:00 GMT	Scott 46'; Pablos 80'	Report	Bronze 23'; Christiansen 60'; Duggan 68'	Stadium: Meadow Park; Attendance: 1,142; Referee: Sam Purkiss

23 August 2015 10	Notts County	2–2	Manchester City	Nottingham
14:00 GMT	Clarke 81' (pen.); Williams 90'	Report	Houghton 44', 54'	Stadium: Meadow Lane; Attendance: 1,683; Referee: Aaron Bannister

6 September 2015 11	Manchester City	1–0	Sunderland	Manchester
14:00 GMT	Christiansen 32'	Report		Stadium: Academy Stadium; Attendance: 992; Referee: Natalie Aspinall

10 September 2015 12	Manchester City	2–0	Liverpool	Manchester
19:00 GMT	Christiansen 45'; Harding 75'	Report		Stadium: Academy Stadium; Attendance: 1,009; Referee: Amy Fearn

27 September 2015 13	Manchester City	6–1	Bristol Academy	Manchester
14:00 GMT	Scott 6'; Christiansen 34', 75'; Bronze 38'; Parris 48'; Stanway 78'	Report	Weir 54'	Stadium: Academy Stadium; Attendance: 1,300; Referee: Peter Gooch

4 October 2015 14	Manchester City	2–1	Notts County	Manchester
14:00 GMT	Parris 13'; Christiansen 45'	Report	Williams 40'	Stadium: Academy Stadium; Attendance: 3,180; Referee: Rebecca Welch

=== FA Cup ===
22 March 2015 Fifth round	Manchester City	3–1	Doncaster Rovers Belles	Manchester
14:00 GMT	Parris 32', 79'; Duggan 90+3'	Report	Little 4'	Stadium: Academy Stadium; Attendance: 514; Referee: Peter Wright

12 April 2015 Sixth round	Manchester City	3–1	Birmingham City	Manchester
13:30 BST	Duggan 16'; Parris 67'; Scott 87'	Report	Haines 82'	Stadium: Academy Stadium

3 May 2015 Semi-final	Chelsea	1–0	Manchester City	Wycombe
14:00 BST	So-Yun 84'	Report		Stadium: Adams Park

=== WSL Cup ===
==== Group stage ====
23 July 2015 1	Doncaster Rovers Belles	0–3	Manchester City	Doncaster
19:00 BST		Report	Christiansen 48'; Parris 68'; Duggan 83'	Stadium: Keepmoat Stadium; Attendance: 1,274

29 July 2015 2	Manchester City	5–0	Durham	Manchester
19:00 BST	Johnston 12', 87'; Parris 24', 41'; Christiansen 30'	Report		Stadium: Academy Stadium; Attendance: 1,185; Referee: Barry Lamb

15 August 2015 3	Sunderland	1–3	Manchester City	Hetton-le-Hole
18:30 BST	Wilson 23'	Report	Parris 11'; Houghton 15'; Duggan 90'	Stadium: The Hetton Centre; Attendance: 1,514

27 August 2015 4	Everton	0–2	Manchester City	Widnes
19:30 BST		Report	Duggan 19'; Stanway 88'	Stadium: Halton Stadium; Attendance: 526; Referee: Scott Simpson

30 August 2015 5	Manchester City	2–0	Liverpool	Manchester
14:00 BST	Duggan 15' (pen.); Christiansen 71'	Report		Stadium: Academy Stadium; Attendance: 1,890; Referee: James Bell

==== Knock-out stages ====
1 October 2015 Quarter-final	Arsenal	1–0	Manchester City	Borehamwood
14:00 BST (UTC+01:00)	de Pablos 34'	Report		Stadium: Meadow Lane; Attendance: 720; Referee: Josh Smith

== Squad information ==
=== Playing statistics ===
As of 4 October 2015

Appearances (Apps.) numbers are for appearances in competitive games only including sub appearances
Red card numbers denote: Numbers in parentheses represent red cards overturned for wrongful dismissal.

No.	Nat.	Player	Pos.	WSL				FA Cup				WSL Cup				Total			
No.	Nat.	Player	Pos.	Apps	Goal	Booked	Sent off (straight red)	Apps	Goal	Booked	Sent off (straight red)	Apps	Goal	Booked	Sent off (straight red)	Apps	Goal	Booked	Sent off (straight red)
1	(England)	Karen Bardsley	GK	11			1	1				6				18			1
2	(England)	Lucy Bronze	DF	11	2	1		2				4		1		17	2	2	
3	(England)	Demi Stokes	DF	14		1		3				5				22		1	
5	(Scotland)	Jennifer Beattie	DF	14				3				4				21			
6	(England)	Steph Houghton	DF	11	2	1		1				6	1			18	3	1	
7	(England)	Krystle Johnston	FW	11				2				5	2			18	2		
8	(England)	Jill Scott	MF	12	1	1	1	2	1			5				19	2	1	1
9	(England)	Toni Duggan	FW	10	6			3	2			5	4			18	12		
11	(England)	Isobel Christiansen	MF	14	6	1		3				6	3			23	9	1	
12	(England)	Georgia Stanway	FW	3	1							2	1			5	2		
13	(England)	Alexandra Brooks	GK	3				2								5			
15	(England)	Chelsea Nightingale	DF	3				2								5			
16	(England)	Emma Lipman	DF	3		1		1				3				7		1	
17	(England)	Nikita Parris	FW	13	4			3	3			5	4			21	11		
19	(England)	Natasha Flint	MF	6				2				4				12			
20	(England)	Georgia Brougham	DF									2				2			
23	(England)	Abbie McManus	DF	7				1				5				13			
24	(England)	Keira Walsh	MF	6				1				4				11			
27	(United States)	Daphne Corboz	MF	7	1							4				11	1		
33	(Germany)	Kathleen Radtke	DF	11				3				5				19			
40	(Wales)	Natasha Harding	MF	10	1			2				1				13	1		
Released	(Wales)	Sarah Wiltshire	FW	1				1								2			
Own goals					1				0				0				1		
Totals					25	6	2		6	0	0		15	1	0		46	7	2

=== Goalscorers ===
Includes all competitive matches. The list is sorted alphabetically by surname when total goals are equal.

Correct as of 4 October 2015

No.	Nat.	Player	Pos.	WSL	FA Cup	WSL Cup	TOTAL
9	(England)	Toni Duggan	FW	6	2	4	12
17	(England)	Nikita Parris	FW	4	3	4	11
11	(England)	Isobel Christiansen	MF	6	0	3	9
6	(England)	Steph Houghton	DF	2	0	1	3
2	(England)	Lucy Bronze	DF	2	0	0	2
7	(England)	Krystle Johnston	FW	0	0	2	2
12	(England)	Georgia Stanway	FW	1	0	1	2
8	(England)	Jill Scott	MF	1	1	0	2
27	(United States)	Daphne Corboz	MF	1	0	0	1
40	(Wales)	Natasha Harding	MF	1	0	0	1
Own Goals				1	0	0	1
Total				25	6	15	46

== Transfers ==
=== Transfers in ===
First Team
Date	Position	No.	Player	From club
17 November 2014	DF	2	(England) Lucy Bronze	(England) Liverpool
2 January 2015	DF	3	(England) Demi Stokes	(United States) South Florida Bulls
3 January 2015	DF	5	(Scotland) Jennifer Beattie	(France) Montpellier
5 January 2015	FW	27	(Wales) Sarah Wiltshire	(England) Yeovil Town
14 March 2015	MF	40	(Wales) Natasha Harding	(England) Bristol Academy
7 July 2015	MF	27	(United States) Daphne Corboz	(United States) Georgetown University
23 July 2015	FW	12	(England) Georgia Stanway	(England) Blackburn Rovers

=== Transfers out ===
First Team
Date	Position	No.	Player	To club
12 June 2015	FW	27	(Wales) Sarah Wiltshire	(England) Yeovil Town

=== Loans in ===
First Team
Start date	End date	Position	No.	Player	From club
14 January 2015	31 October 2015	FW	10	(England) Nikita Parris	(England) Everton
