= 2014 Manchester City W.F.C. season =

Manchester City Women
2014 season
- Chairman: Khaldoon Mubarak
- Manager: Nick Cushing
- Stadium: Manchester Regional Arena
- Women's Super League: 5th
- FA Cup: Quarter-final
- WSL Cup: Winners
Home colours	Away colours

The 2014 season is Manchester City Women's Football Club's 26th season of competitive football and its first season in the FA Women's Super League and at the top level of English women's football, having been promoted from the FA Women's Premier League.

In September, the team made club history by reaching their first ever cup final, beating Chelsea to reach the final of the FA WSL Cup. Drawn against Arsenal, they won 1–0 to lift the first major honour in their history.

== Non-competitive ==
=== Pre-season ===
N.B. Games against Celtic played as 60-minute matches only. Line-ups rotated between games.

9 February 2014 Friendly	Manchester City XI (England)	3–0	(Scotland) Celtic XI	Manchester
14:00 GMT	Steph Marsh (?); Christiansen (?)	Report

9 February 2014 Friendly	Manchester City XI (England)	0–0	(Scotland) Celtic XI	Manchester
16:00 GMT		Report

23 February 2014 Friendly	Glasgow City (Scotland)	0–0	(England) Manchester City	Glasgow
14:00 GMT		Report		Stadium: Petershill Park; Referee: Ross Haswell

23 March 2014 Friendly	Durham (England)	0–7	(England) Manchester City	Durham
14:00 GMT		Report	Duggan 26', 46', 90'; Hassett 28'; Scott 45'; Houghton 75'; Young 90'	Stadium: New Ferens Park

30 March 2014 Friendly	Manchester City (England)	2–0	(England) Aston Villa	Manchester
14:00 GMT	Johnston 3'; Duggan 44'	Report		Stadium: Manchester Regional Arena

== Competitions ==
=== League table ===
Pos	Team	Pld	W	D	L	GF	GA	GD	Pts
3	Birmingham City	14	7	4	3	20	14	+6	25
4	Arsenal	14	6	3	5	24	21	+3	21
5	Manchester City	14	6	1	7	13	16	−3	19
6	Notts County	14	4	6	4	12	8	+4	18
7	Bristol Academy	14	5	1	8	18	24	−6	16

Source: FA WSL
Rules for classification: 1) Points; 2) Goal difference; 3) Number of goals scored

==== Results summary ====
Overall								Home						Away					
Pld	W	D	L	GF	GA	GD	Pts	W	D	L	GF	GA	GD	W	D	L	GF	GA	GD
14	6	1	7	13	16	−3	19	4	0	3	7	9	−2	2	1	4	6	7	−1

Last updated: 12 October 2014.
Source: WSL

==== Results by matchday ====
Matchday	1	2	3	4	5	6	7	8	9	10	11	12	13	14
Ground	A	H	A	H	A	H	A	H	A	H	A	A	H	H
Result	L	L	W	W	L	W	L	W	L	D	W	L	L	W
Position	7	8	6	2	6	4	4	4	4	6	5	6	7	5

Updated to match(es) played on 12 October 2014. Source: FA WSL
A = Away; H = Home; W = Win; D = Draw; L = Loss

==== Matches ====
17 April 2014 1	Liverpool	1–0	Manchester City	Widnes
14:00 BST	Dowie 70'	report		Stadium: Halton Stadium; Attendance: 1,572; Referee: Amy Fearn

20 April 2014 2	Manchester City	0–2	Bristol Academy	Manchester
14:00 BST		Report	Houghton 10' (o.g.); James 17'	Stadium: Manchester Regional Arena; Attendance: 1,253; Referee: Duncan Street

18 May 2014 3	Arsenal	0–1	Manchester City	Borehamwood
14:00 BST		Report	Duggan 11'	Stadium: Meadow Park; Attendance: 829

21 May 2014 4	Manchester City	2–0	Everton	Manchester
19:30 BST	George 25' (o.g.); Scott 46'	Report		Stadium: Manchester Regional Arena; Attendance: 947

29 June 2014 5	Birmingham City	2–0	Manchester City	Stratford upon Avon
14:00 BST	Linnett 47'; Harrop 88'	Report		Stadium: The DCS Stadium; Referee: Sian Pettit / Mark Billingham

17 July 2014 6	Manchester City	1–0	Notts County	Manchester
19:45 BST	Flint 17'	Report		Stadium: Manchester Regional Arena; Attendance: 820; Referee: Kelvin Sarsfield

20 July 2014 7	Chelsea	2–1	Manchester City	Staines
14:00 BST	Chapman 61'; Groenen 90'	Report	Flint 27'	Stadium: Wheatsheaf Park; Referee: Paul Kelly

27 July 2014 8	Manchester City	1–0	Liverpool	Manchester
14:00 BST	Johnston 17'	Report		Stadium: Manchester Regional Arena; Attendance: 920; Referee: Matthew Pope

24 August 2014 9	Manchester City	0–4	Arsenal	Manchester
14:00 BST		Report	Nobbs 5'; Carter 58'; Yankey 68'; Stoney 82'	Stadium: Manchester Regional Arena; Attendance: 891; Referee: Duncan Carratt

3 September 2014 10	Notts County	1–1	Manchester City	Nottingham
14:00 BST	Clarke 58'	Report	Duggan 61'	Stadium: Meadow Lane; Attendance: 498; Referee: Lisa Rashid

21 September 2014 11	Everton	0–3	Manchester City	Liverpool
14:00 BST		Report	Scott 6'; Johnson 56' (o.g.); Duggan 90'	Stadium: Rossett Park; Attendance: 512

28 September 2014 12	Bristol Academy	1–0	Manchester City	Filton
14:00 BST	Yorston 44'	Report		Stadium: Stoke Gifford Stadium; Attendance: 374; Referee: Sarah Garrett

5 October 2014 13	Manchester City	1–2	Birmingham City	Manchester
14:00 BST	Scott 62'	Report	Carney 15', 86'	Stadium: Manchester Regional Arena; Attendance: 520; Referee: Paul Graham

12 October 2014 14	Manchester City	2–1	Chelsea	Manchester
14:00 BST	Scott 23'; Duggan 34'	Report	Flaherty 70'	Stadium: Manchester Regional Arena; Attendance: 1,292; Referee: Anthony Tankard

=== FA Cup ===
13 April 2014 Fifth round	Manchester City	2–1	Reading	Manchester
14:00	Duggan 7', 79'	Report	McGee 12'	Stadium: Manchester Regional Arena

27 April 2014 Quarter-final	Manchester City	1–3	Chelsea	Manchester
14:00	Duggan 14' (pen.)	Report	Coombs 8'; Aluko 17'; Chapman 59'	Stadium: Manchester Regional Arena; Attendance: 597

=== WSL Cup ===
==== Group stage ====
1 May 2014 1	Doncaster Rovers Belles	2–1	Manchester City	Doncaster
19:45 BST	England 43'; Smith 55'	Report	Duggan 90'	Stadium: Keepmoat Stadium; Attendance: 308; Referee: Anthony Tankard

4 May 2014 2	Manchester City	1–0	Everton	Manchester
12:00 BST	Flint 89'	Report		Stadium: City of Manchester Stadium; Attendance: 1,462; Referee: Richard Holmes

14 May 2014 3	Manchester City	2–1	Liverpool	Manchester
19:30 BST	McManus 4'; Christiansen 52'		Dowie 19'	Stadium: Manchester Regional Arena; Attendance: 746

6 July 2014 4	Manchester City	2–0	Sunderland	Manchester
14:00 BST	Houghton 74'; Duggan 78'	Report		Stadium: Manchester Regional Arena; Attendance: 670; Referee: Paul Graham

13 July 2014 5	Durham	0–3	Manchester City	Durham
14:00 BST		Report	Johnston 27'; Duggan 38'; Scott 83'	Stadium: New Ferens Park; Attendance: 379; Referee: Matthew Dicicco

==== Knock-out stages ====
7 September 2014 Semi-final	Manchester City	1–0	Chelsea	Hyde
14:00 BST	Duggan 51'	Report		Stadium: Ewen Fields; Attendance: 752; Referee: Helen Byrne

16 October 2014 Final	Manchester City	1–0	Arsenal	High Wycombe
19:45 BST	Christiansen 73'	Report		Stadium: Adams Park; Attendance: 3,697; Referee: Nigel Lugg

== Squad information ==
=== Playing statistics ===
As of the end of the season

Appearances (Apps.) numbers are for appearances in competitive games only including sub appearances
Red card numbers denote: Numbers in parentheses represent red cards overturned for wrongful dismissal.

No.	Nat.	Player	Pos.	WSL				FA Cup				WSL Cup				Total			
No.	Nat.	Player	Pos.	Apps	Goal	Booked	Sent off (straight red)	Apps	Goal	Booked	Sent off (straight red)	Apps	Goal	Booked	Sent off (straight red)	Apps	Goal	Booked	Sent off (straight red)
1	(England)	Karen Bardsley	GK	11								7		1		18		1	
2	(England)	Danni Lea	DF																
3	(England)	Steph Marsh	DF	2				2				1				5			
4	(England)	Jess Holbrook	MF	5		1		1				2				8		1	
6	(England)	Steph Houghton	DF	13		2		2		1		7	1			22	1	3	
7	(England)	Krystle Johnston	FW	14	1	1		1				7	1			22	2	1	
8	(England)	Jill Scott	MF	14	4			2		1		7	1			23	5	1	
9	(England)	Toni Duggan	FW	13	4	1		2	3			6	4	1		21	11	2	
10	(Northern Ireland)	Kim Turner	MF																
11	(England)	Isobel Christiansen	MF	14				2				7	2			23	2		
12	(New Zealand)	Betsy Hassett	MF	13				2				6				21			
13	(England)	Alexandra Brooks	GK	1								1				2			
14	(England)	Nikki Harding	DF	5		1		1		1		4				10		2	
15	(England)	Chelsea Nightingale	DF	10		1		1				3				14		1	
16	(England)	Emma Lipman	DF	12				2				7				21			
17	(Northern Ireland)	Lynda Shepherd	MF	2				1				2				5			
18	(England)	Dannii Young	FW	6								3				9			
19	(England)	Natasha Flint	MF	13	2			2				7	1	1		22	3	1	
20	(England)	Georgia Brougham	MF	4								2				6			
21	(Wales)	Andrea Worrall	GK	2				2								4			
22	(New Zealand)	Emma Kete	FW	4								1				5			
23	(England)	Abbie McManus	DF	12		1	1					6	1			18	1	1	1
24	(England)	Keira Walsh	MF	7								1				8			
33	(Germany)	Kathleen Radtke	DF	5		2						3				8		2	
Own goals					2				0				0				2		
Totals					13	10	1		3	3	0		11	3	0		27	16	1

=== Goalscorers ===
Includes all competitive matches. The list is sorted alphabetically by surname when total goals are equal.

Correct as of the end of the season

No.	Nat.	Player	Pos.	WSL	FA Cup	WSL Cup	TOTAL
9	(England)	Toni Duggan	FW	4	3	4	11
8	(England)	Jill Scott	MF	4	0	1	5
19	(England)	Natasha Flint	MF	2	0	1	3
11	(England)	Isobel Christiansen	MF	0	0	2	2
7	(England)	Krystle Johnston	FW	1	0	1	2
6	(England)	Steph Houghton	DF	0	0	1	1
23	(England)	Abbie McManus	DF	0	0	1	1
Own Goals				2	0	0	2
Total				13	3	11	27

== Awards ==
=== Football Association England Women's Player of the Year award ===
Awarded annually to the player chosen by a public vote on the Football Association website

Year	Player
2014	(England) Toni Duggan

== Transfers ==
=== Transfers in ===
First Team
Date	Position	No.	Player	From club
July 2013	DF	16	(England) Emma Lipman	(England) Leeds United
15 November 2013	MF	8	(England) Jill Scott	(England) Everton
22 November 2013	GK	1	(England) Karen Bardsley	(England) Lincoln Ladies
28 November 2013	FW	9	(England) Toni Duggan	(England) Everton
9 December 2013	DF	3	(England) Steph Marsh	(England) Blackburn Rovers
1 January 2014	DF	6	(England) Steph Houghton	(England) Arsenal
7 January 2014	MF	12	(New Zealand) Betsy Hassett	(Germany) SC Sand
8 January 2014	FW	18	(England) Dannii Young	(England) Blackburn Rovers
24 January 2014	MF	4	(England) Jess Holbrook	(England) Liverpool
7 February 2014	MF	11	(England) Isobel Christiansen	(England) Birmingham City
3 July 2014	DF	33	(Germany) Kathleen Radtke	(Sweden) FC Rosengård
18 July 2014	FW	22	(New Zealand) Emma Kete	(United States) Western New York Flash
