= 2017–18 Manchester City W.F.C. season =

Manchester City Women
2017–18 season
- Chairman: Khaldoon Mubarak
- Manager: Nick Cushing
- Stadium: Academy Stadium
- Women's Super League: 2nd
- FA Women's Cup: Semi-finals
- WSL Cup: Runner-up
- Champions League: Semi-final
Home colours	Away colours

The 2017–18 season was Manchester City Women's Football Club's 30th season of competitive football and its fifth season in the FA Women's Super League, the top level of English women's football.

Following the reorganisation of top-level women's football in England, the 2017–18 season was the first in the WSL era in which the calendar runs from Autumn to Spring in line with the men's game. Due to another reorganisation of the women's game, with WSL 1 becoming a league for fully professional teams only, there was no relegation in the league for this season.

== Non-competitive ==
=== Pre-season ===
==== Friendly ====
20 August 2017 Friendly	1. FFC Frankfurt (Germany)	3–0	(England) Manchester City	Frankfurt, Germany
15:00 CEST	Crnogorčević 1'; Matheis 5', 84'	Report		Stadium: Stadion am Brentanobad; Referee: Karolin Wacker

==== Toulouse International Ladies Cup ====
Team	Pld	W	D	L	GF	GA	GD	Pts
(France) Montpellier	2	2	0	0	7	2	+5	6
(France) Olympique Lyonnais	2	1	0	1	8	3	+5	3
(England) Manchester City	2	1	0	1	4	7	−3	3
(England) Liverpool	2	0	0	2	0	9	−9	0

25 August 2017 Friendly	Montpellier (France)	4–2	(England) Manchester City	Toulouse, France
19:30 CEST	Gauvin 13', 38'; Karchaoui 23', 51'	Report	Ross 61', 80'	Stadium: Stade Ernest-Wallon

27 August 2017 Friendly	Olympique Lyonnais (France)	2–3	(England) Manchester City	Toulouse, France
15:30 CEST	Abily 54', 78'	Report	Christiansen 6', 37'; Bremer 86'	Stadium: Stade Ernest-Wallon

== Competitions ==
=== Women's Super League ===
==== League table ====
Pos	Team	Pld	W	D	L	GF	GA	GD	Pts	Qualification
1	Chelsea (C)	18	13	5	0	44	13	+31	44	Qualification for the Champions League knockout phase
2	Manchester City	18	12	2	4	51	17	+34	38	Qualification for the Champions League knockout phase
3	Arsenal	18	11	4	3	38	18	+20	37	
4	Reading	18	9	5	4	40	18	+22	32	
5	Birmingham City	18	9	3	6	30	18	+12	30	

Source: FA WSL
Rules for classification: 1) Points; 2) Goal difference; 3) Number of goals scored
(C) Champions

==== Results summary ====
Overall								Home						Away					
Pld	W	D	L	GF	GA	GD	Pts	W	D	L	GF	GA	GD	W	D	L	GF	GA	GD
18	12	2	4	51	17	+34	38	7	1	1	29	7	+22	5	1	3	22	10	+12

Last updated: 20 May 2018.
Source: FA WSL

==== Results by matchday ====
Matchday	1	2	3	4	5	6	7	8	9	10	11	12	13	14	15	16	17	18
Ground	A	H	A	H	H	A	A	A	H	A	H	H	H	A	A	A	H	H
Result	W	W	W	W	W	W	W	D	W	L	D	L	W	W	L	L	W	W
Position	2	2	2	2	1	1	1	1	1	2	2	2	2	2	2	2	2	2

Updated to match(es) played on 20 May 2018. Source: FA WSL
A = Away; H = Home; W = Win; D = Draw; L = Loss

==== Matches ====
24 September 2017 1	Yeovil Town	0–4	Manchester City	Yeovil
14:00 BST (UTC+01:00)		Report	Christiansen 7'; Ross 37'; Scott 58'; Stanway 83'	Stadium: Huish Park; Attendance: 1,302; Referee: Adam Bromley

30 September 2017 2	Manchester City	5–2	Arsenal	Manchester
12:30 BST (UTC+01:00)	Ross 39'; Houghton 45'; Stanway 70'; Christiansen 75'; Scott 79'	Report	Mitchell 45'; O'Reilly 47'	Stadium: Academy Stadium; Attendance: 1,646; Referee: Amy Fearn

7 October 2017 3	Everton	2–3	Manchester City	Widnes
19:00 BST (UTC+01:00)	Walker 4'; Magill 65'	Report	Houghton 12'; Parris 13'; Bremer 18'	Stadium: Select Security Stadium; Attendance: 735; Referee: Thomas Kirk

29 October 2017 4	Manchester City	3–1	Birmingham City	Manchester
12:30 GMT (UTC+00:00)	Christiansen 76' (pen.), 90+8' (pen.); Beattie 90+1'	Report	Quinn 5'; Harrop (red card) 78'	Stadium: Academy Stadium; Attendance: 1,465; Referee: Helen Byrne

12 November 2017 5	Manchester City	4–0	Bristol City	Manchester
14:00 GMT (UTC+00:00)	Christiansen 7' (pen.); Emslie 37'; McManus 58'; Beattie 86'	Report		Stadium: Academy Stadium; Attendance: 1,256; Referee: Helen Conley

7 January 2018 6	Reading	2–5	Manchester City	High Wycombe
14:00 GMT (UTC+00:00)	Allen 34'; Chaplen 41'	Report	Nadim 6'; Emslie 32'; Christiansen 43'; Scott 56', 58'	Stadium: Adams Park; Attendance: 951

28 January 2018 7	Sunderland	0–3	Manchester City	South Shields
18:00 GMT (UTC+00:00)		Report	Parris 36', 72'; Christiansen 56'	Stadium: Mariners Park; Attendance: 978; Referee: Helen Conley

1 February 2018 8	Chelsea	0–0	Manchester City	Kingston upon Thames
19:00 GMT (UTC+00:00)		Report		Stadium: Kingsmeadow; Attendance: 2,648; Referee: Amy Hearn

11 February 2018 9	Manchester City	4–0	Liverpool	Manchester
14:00 GMT (UTC+00:00)	Parris 1', 60'; Christiansen 56' (pen.); McManus 73'	Report		Stadium: Academy Stadium; Attendance: 2,356; Referee: Scott Simpson

21 February 2018 10	Birmingham City	2–0	Manchester City	Solihull
19:45 GMT (UTC+00:00)		Report		Stadium: Damson Park; Attendance: 803; Referee: Sian Massey-Ellis

24 February 2018 11	Manchester City	2–2	Chelsea	Manchester
12:30 GMT (UTC+00:00)	Parris 49'; Stanway 86'	Report	Bright 6'; So-yun 24'	Stadium: Academy Stadium; Attendance: 1,417; Referee: Simon Mather

1 April 2018 12	Manchester City	0–2	Reading	Manchester
14:00 BST (UTC+01:00)		Report		Stadium: Academy Stadium; Attendance: 1,274; Referee: Helen Conley

18 April 2018 13	Manchester City	3–0	Sunderland	Manchester
18:00 BST (UTC+01:00)	Stanway 15', 87'; Nadim 90'	Report		Stadium: Academy Stadium; Attendance: 943; Referee: Aaron Jackson

3 May 2018 14	Bristol City	1–6	Manchester City	Filton
20:00 GMT (UTC+00:00)	Turner 65'	Report	Scott 41'; Emslie 51'; Ross 57'; Parris 58'; Nadim 80'; Lawley 90'	Stadium: Stoke Gifford Stadium; Attendance: 568

8 May 2018 15	Liverpool	1–0	Manchester City	Widnes
17:30 BST (UTC+01:00)	England 3'	Report		Stadium: Select Security Stadium; Referee: P Gibbons

12 May 2018 16	Arsenal	2–1	Manchester City	Borehamwood
14:00 BST (UTC+01:00)	van de Donk 50'; Mead 61'	Report	Nadim 10'	Stadium: Meadow Park; Referee: Rebecca Welch

16 May 2018 17	Manchester City	5–0	Yeovil Town	Manchester
14:00 BST (UTC+01:00)	Emslie 44'; Parris 47', 74', 76'; Christiansen 81'	Report		Stadium: Academy Stadium; Attendance: 750; Referee: Lindsey Robinson

20 May 2018 18	Manchester City	3–0	Everton	Manchester
12:00 BST (UTC+01:00)	Scott 21', 59'; Parris 56'			Stadium: Academy Stadium; Attendance: 1,605; Referee: Leigh Doherty

=== FA Cup ===
4 February 2018 Fourth round	Brighton & Hove Albion	0–2	Manchester City	Lancing
14:00 GMT (UTC+00:00)		Report	Christiansen 45'; Emslie 66'	Stadium: Culver Road; Attendance: 1,372; Referee: Michael Lowe

18 February 2018 Fifth round	Birmingham City	1–3 (a.e.t.)	Manchester City	Solihull
00:00 GMT (UTC+00:00)	White 37'	Report	Nadim 13'; Stanway 97'; Emslie 119'	Stadium: Damson Park; Attendance: 641; Referee: Wayne Cartmel

18 March 2018 Quarter-finals	Sunderland	2–4 (a.e.t.)	Manchester City	South Shields
00:00 GMT (UTC+00:00)	Williams 32'; Staniforth 76'	Report	Stokes 72'; Ross 90', 96'; Toone 114'	Stadium: Mariners Park; Attendance: 552; Referee: Dean Hulme

15 April 2018 Semi-finals	Chelsea	2–0	Manchester City	Kingston upon Thames
15:30 BST (UTC+01:00)	Fran Kirby 5', 74'	Report		Stadium: Kingsmeadow; Attendance: 3,048; Referee: Sarah Garratt

=== WSL Cup ===
==== Group stage ====
Pos	Team	Pld	W	WPEN	LPEN	L	GF	GA	GD	Pts	Qualification	MCI	EVE	BIR	DON	OXF
1	Manchester City	4	4	0	0	0	13	3	+10	12	Advance to knock-out stage	—	2–1	2–0	—	—
2	Everton	4	3	0	0	1	9	2	+7	9	Advance to knock-out stage	—	—	1–0	—	4–0
3	Birmingham City	4	2	0	0	2	7	5	+2	6		—	—	—	3–2	4–0
4	Doncaster Rovers Belles	4	1	0	0	3	9	10	−1	3		2–3	0–3	—	—	—
5	Oxford United	4	0	0	0	4	1	19	−18	0		0–6	—	—	1–5	—

Source: FA WSL
Rules for classification: 1) Points; 2) Goal difference; 3) Number of goals scored

2 November 2017 1	Oxford United	0–6	Manchester City	Abingdon
17:45 GMT (UTC+00:00)		Report	Christiansen 44'; Stanway 45', 53'; Emslie 57'; Beattie 79', 86'	Stadium: The Armadillo Stadium; Attendance: 777; Referee: Daniel Lamport

5 November 2017 2	Manchester City	2–1	Everton	Manchester
14:00 GMT (UTC+00:00)	Christiansen 25'; Parris 80'	Report	Magill 77'	Stadium: Academy Stadium; Attendance: 873; Referee: Samuel Barrott

3 December 2017 3	Manchester City	2–0	Birmingham City	Manchester
14:00 GMT (UTC+00:00)	Parris 18'; Emslie 36'	Report		Stadium: Academy Stadium; Attendance: 1,077; Referee: Christopher Porter

6 December 2017 4	Doncaster Rovers Belles	2–3	Manchester City	Doncaster
19:30 GMT (UTC+00:00)	Sigsworth 53'; Murray 75'	Report	Emslie 4'; Ross 55'; Stanway 58'	Stadium: Keepmoat Stadium; Attendance: 924; Referee: Rebecca Welch

==== Knockout rounds ====
17 December 2017 Quarter-finals	Bristol City	0–2	Manchester City	Almondsbury
14:00 GMT (UTC+00:00)		Report	Nikita Parris 62'; Jen Beattie 88'	Stadium: Oaklands Park; Attendance: 352; Referee: Savvas Yianni

14 January 2018 Semi-finals	Chelsea	0–1	Manchester City	Kingston upon Thames
14:00 GMT (UTC+00:00)		Report	Nadim 19'	Stadium: Kingsmeadow; Attendance: 2,595; Referee: Rebecca Welch

14 March 2018 Final	Manchester City	0–1	Arsenal	High Wycombe
19:00 GMT (UTC+00:00)		Report	Miedema 32'	Stadium: Adams Park; Attendance: 2,136; Referee: Amy Fearn (Derbyshire)

=== Champions League ===
==== Round of 32 ====
4 October 2017 First leg	St. Pölten (Austria)	0–3	(England) Manchester City	St. Pölten, Austria
19:15 CEST (UTC+02:00)		Report	Stokes 22'; Houghton 31'; Parris 35'	Stadium: NV Arena; Attendance: 2,337; Referee: Sandra Bastos

12 October 2017 Second leg	Manchester City (England)	3–0	(Austria) St. Pölten	Manchester
19:00 BST (UTC+01:00)	Parris 34'; Scott 43'; Lawley 84'	Report		Stadium: Academy Stadium; Attendance: 1,041; Referee: Monika Mularczyk

==== Round of 16 ====
9 November 2017 First leg	Lillestrøm (Norway)	0–5	(England) Manchester City	Lillestrøm, Norway
18:30 CET (UTC+01:00)		Report	Stokes 26'; Christiansen 39'; Emslie 69'; Ross 73', 77'	Stadium: LSK-Hallen; Attendance: 1,226; Referee: Stéphanie Frappart

16 November 2017 Second leg	Manchester City (England)	2–1	(Norway) Lillestrøm	Manchester
20:00 GMT (UTC+00:00)	Christiansen 46'; Parris 72'	Report	Berget 17'	Stadium: Academy Stadium; Referee: Olga Zadinová

==== Quarter-finals ====
21 March 2018 First leg	Manchester City (England)	2–0	(Sweden) Linköpings FC	Manchester
19:00 GMT (UTC+00:00)	Parris 37' (pen.); Ross 55'	Report		Stadium: Academy Stadium; Attendance: 1,259; Referee: Stéphanie Frappart (France)

28 March 2018 Second leg	Linköpings FC (Sweden)	3–5	(England) Manchester City	Linköping, Sweden
18:00 CET (UTC+01:00)	Banušić 51', 60' (pen.); Almqvist 77'	Report	Ross 14'; Stanway 23', 33'; Beattie 42'; Christiansen 64'	Stadium: Linköping Arena; Attendance: 1,903; Referee: Jana Adámková (Czech Republic)

==== Semi-finals ====
22 April 2018 First leg	Manchester City (England)	0–0	(France) Lyon	Academy Stadium, Manchester
14:00 GMT (UTC+00:00)		Report		Attendance: 2,876; Referee: Bibiana Steinhaus (Germany)

29 April 2018 Second leg	Lyon (France)	1–0	(England) Manchester City	Parc Olympique Lyonnais, Décines-Charpieu
14:45 CET (UTC+01:00)	Bronze 17'	Report		Attendance: 20,837; Referee: Katalin Kulcsár (Hungary)

== Squad information ==
=== Playing statistics ===
As of end of season

Appearances (Apps.) numbers are for appearances in competitive games only including sub appearances
Red card numbers denote: Numbers in parentheses represent red cards overturned for wrongful dismissal.

No.	Nat.	Player	Pos.	WSL			FA Cup			WSL Cup			Champions League			Total		
No.	Nat.	Player	Pos.	Apps	Goal	Sent off (straight red)	Apps	Goal	Sent off (straight red)	Apps	Goal	Sent off (straight red)	Apps	Goal	Sent off (straight red)	Apps	Goal	Sent off (straight red)
1	(England)	Karen Bardsley	GK	7						4			3			14		
2	(Denmark)	Mie Jans	DF	4			3			1			2			10		
3	(England)	Demi Stokes	DF	15			4	1		4			8	2		31	3	
4	(Netherlands)	Tessel Middag	MF	1			1						1			3		
5	(Scotland)	Jen Beattie	DF	18	2		4			7	3		8	1		37	6	
6	(England)	Steph Houghton	DF	15	2		1			7			8	1		31	3	
7	(England)	Melissa Lawley	FW	12	1		3			4			7	1		26	2	
8	(England)	Jill Scott	MF	16	7		3			6			8	1		33	8	
9	(Germany)	Pauline Bremer	FW	2	1								1			3	1	
10	(Denmark)	Nadia Nadim	FW	12	4		4	1		2	1		2			20	6	
11	(England)	Izzy Christiansen	MF	17	9		4	1		7	2		7	3		35	15	
12	(England)	Georgia Stanway	FW	14	5		3	1		5	3		6	2		28	11	
14	(England)	Esme Morgan	DF	7						3						10		
16	(Scotland)	Jane Ross	FW	12	3		2	2		5	1		5	4		24	10	
17	(England)	Nikita Parris	FW	18	11		4			6	3		8	4		36	18	
18	(England)	Ella Toone	FW	3			1	1		3						7	1	
20	(Republic of Ireland)	Megan Campbell	DF	4						2			4			10		
21	(Republic of Ireland)	Marie Hourihan	GK	1						2						3		
22	(Scotland)	Claire Emslie	FW	17	4		4	2		7	3		8	1		36	10	
23	(England)	Abbie McManus	DF	16	2		4			7			8			35	2	
24	(England)	Keira Walsh	MF	18			3			7			8			36		
26	(England)	Ellie Roebuck	GK	11			4			1			5			21		
33	(England)	Jess Park	MF							1						1		
	(Sweden)	Julia Spetsmark	MF	3						1						4		
Own goals					0			0			0			0			0	
Totals					51	0		9	0		16	0		20	0		96	0

== Transfers and loans ==
=== Transfers in ===
Date	Position	No.	Player	From club
1 July 2017	DF	2	(Denmark) Mie Jans	(Denmark) Brøndby IF
1 July 2017	FW	22	(Scotland) Claire Emslie	(England) Bristol City
1 July 2017	DF	14	(England) Esme Morgan	Promoted from academy
18 August 2017	FW	9	(Germany) Pauline Bremer	(France) Olympique Lyonnais
1 January 2018	FW	10	(Denmark) Nadia Nadim	(United States) Portland Thorns
1 January 2018	MF		(Sweden) Julia Spetsmark	(Sweden) Örebro

=== Transfers out ===
Date	Position	No.	Player	To club
30 June 2017	MF	10	(United States) Carli Lloyd	(United States) Houston Dash
6 July 2017	FW	9	(England) Toni Duggan	(Spain) FC Barcelona
10 August 2017	FW	7	(Sweden) Kosovare Asllani	(Sweden) Linköpings FC
18 August 2017	DF	2	(England) Lucy Bronze	(France) Olympique Lyonnais
