= Alexandra Brooks =

English footballer (born 1995)

Alex Brooks
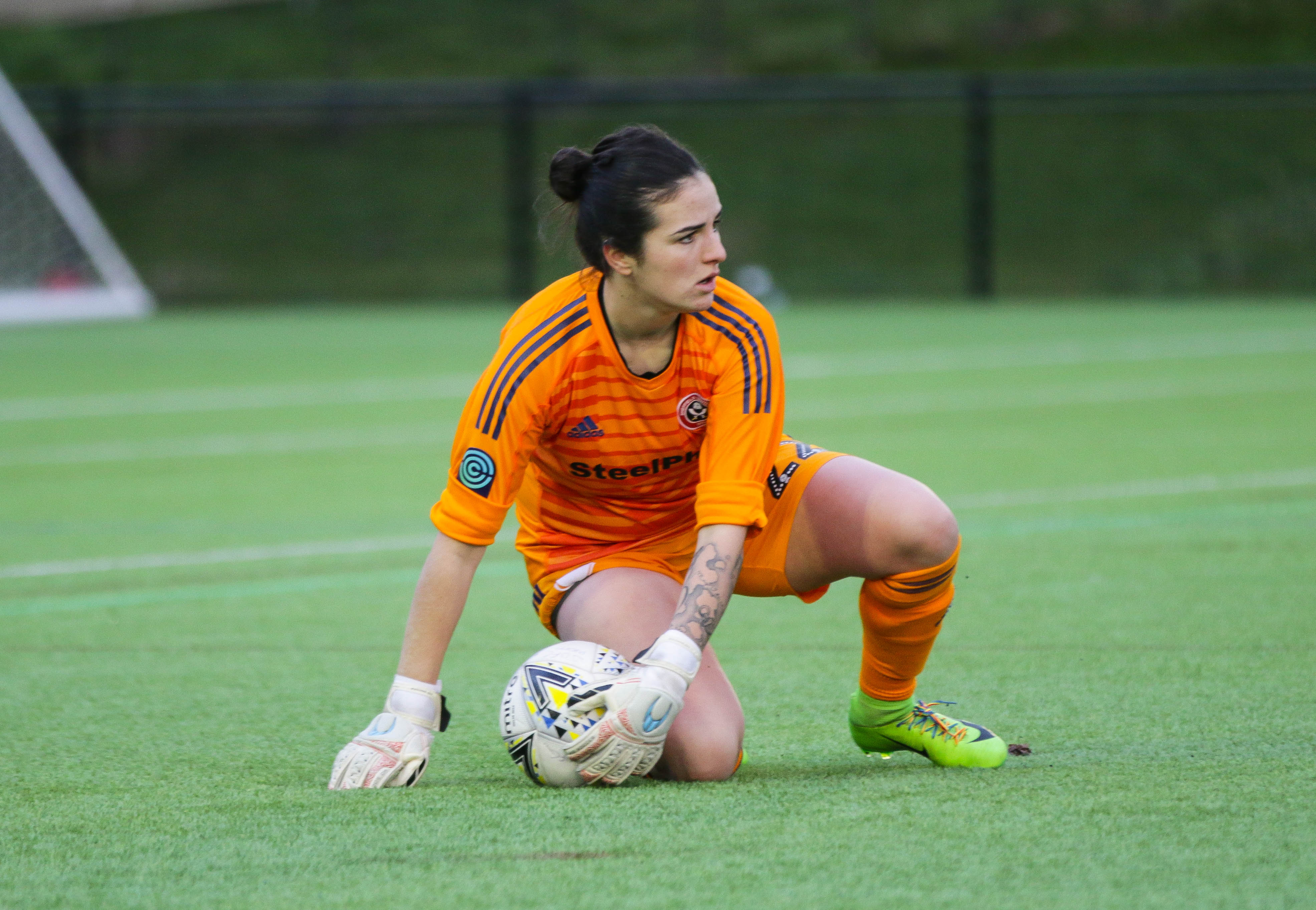
- Alexandra Brooks playing for Sheffield United in November 2018

Personal information
- Full name: Alexandra Grace Brooks
- Date of birth: 19 January 1995 (age 31)
- Place of birth: Wythenshawe, England
- Position: Goalkeeper

Team information
- Current team: Wolverhampton Wanderers
- Number: 1

Youth career
- –2014: Manchester City

Senior career*
Years	Team	Apps	(Gls)
2014–2018	Manchester City	4	(0)
2016	→ Everton (loan)	0	(0)
2017–2018	Fylde		
2018	Blackburn Rovers		
2018–2019	Sheffield United	9	(0)
2019–2020	Birmingham City	0	(0)
2020–2025	Blackburn Rovers	61	(0)
2025–	Wolverhampton Wanderers	0	(0)
- * Club domestic league appearances and goals as of 18:21, 3 March 2024 (UTC)

Alexandra "Alex" Grace Brooks (born 19 January 1995) is an English footballer who plays as a goalkeeper for Wolverhampton Wanderers in the Women's National League North.

== Club career ==
A product of the team's academy system, Brooks made her first team debut for Manchester City on 13 July 2014, replacing Karen Bardsley. Brooks signed her first professional contract with the club in February 2015.

Ahead of the 2016 WSL season, Brooks joined Everton on loan.

Between 2017 and 2018, Brooks played with AFC Fylde in the Women's National League Northern Premier Division.

In August 2018, Brooks signed with fellow Women's National League side Blackburn Rovers.

Ahead of the start of the 2018–19 Women's Championship, Brooks joined Sheffield United.

On 26 January 2019, Brooks joined Birmingham City and returned to play in the WSL. She made only three appearances across all competitions for the team, with Hannah Hampton starting all league games.

In the summer of 2020, Brooks returned to play for former club Blackburn Rovers, who had been promoted to the Women's Championship. During her first season back at the club, she was awarded Women's Championship Player of the Month for November, and was nominated for the team's Player of the Year. She was named Blackburn's Player's Player of the Year in 2024.

In August 2025, Brooks signed for Women's National League North team Wolverhampton Wanderers. In May 2026, the Wolves earned promotion to the WSL 2, with Brooks named Player of the Match as the team secured a 1–0 victory over Plymouth Argyle.

== Career statistics ==
=== Club ===
As of match played 3 March 2024

Club	Season	League			Cup		League Cup		Total	
Club	Season	Division	Apps	Goals	Apps	Goals	Apps	Goals	Apps	Goals
Manchester City	2014	FA WSL	1	0	0	0	1	0	2	0
Manchester City	2015	FA WSL	3	0	2	0	0	0	5	0
Manchester City	Total		4	0	2	0	1	0	7	0
Everton (loan)	2016	FA WSL 2	0	0	0	0	0	0	0	0
Everton (loan)	2017	FA WSL Spring Series	0	0	0	0	0	0	0	0
Everton (loan)	Total		0	0	0	0	0	0	0	0
Manchester City	2017–18	FA WSL	0	0	0	0	0	0	0	0
Manchester City	Total		0	0	0	0	0	0	0	0
Sheffield United	2018–19	FA WSL 2	9	0	0	0	2	0	11	0
Sheffield United	Total		9	0	0	0	2	0	11	0
Birmingham City	2018–19	FA WSL	0	0	0	0	0	0	0	0
Birmingham City	2019-20	FA WSL	0	0	0	0	2	0	2	0
Birmingham City	Total		0	0	0	0	2	0	2	0
Blackburn Rovers	2020-21	FA Women's Championship	14	0	0	0	2	0	16	0
Blackburn Rovers	2021-22	FA Women's Championship	19	0	2	0	2	0	23	0
Blackburn Rovers	2022-23	FA Women's Championship	13	0	1	0	4	0	18	0
Blackburn Rovers	2023-24	FA Women's Championship	15	0	2	0	0	0	17	0
Blackburn Rovers	Total		61	0	5	0	8	0	74	0
Career total			74	0	7	0	13	0	94	0

== Honours ==
Manchester City

- Women's League Cup: 2014
