= Tessel Middag =

Dutch footballer (born 1992)

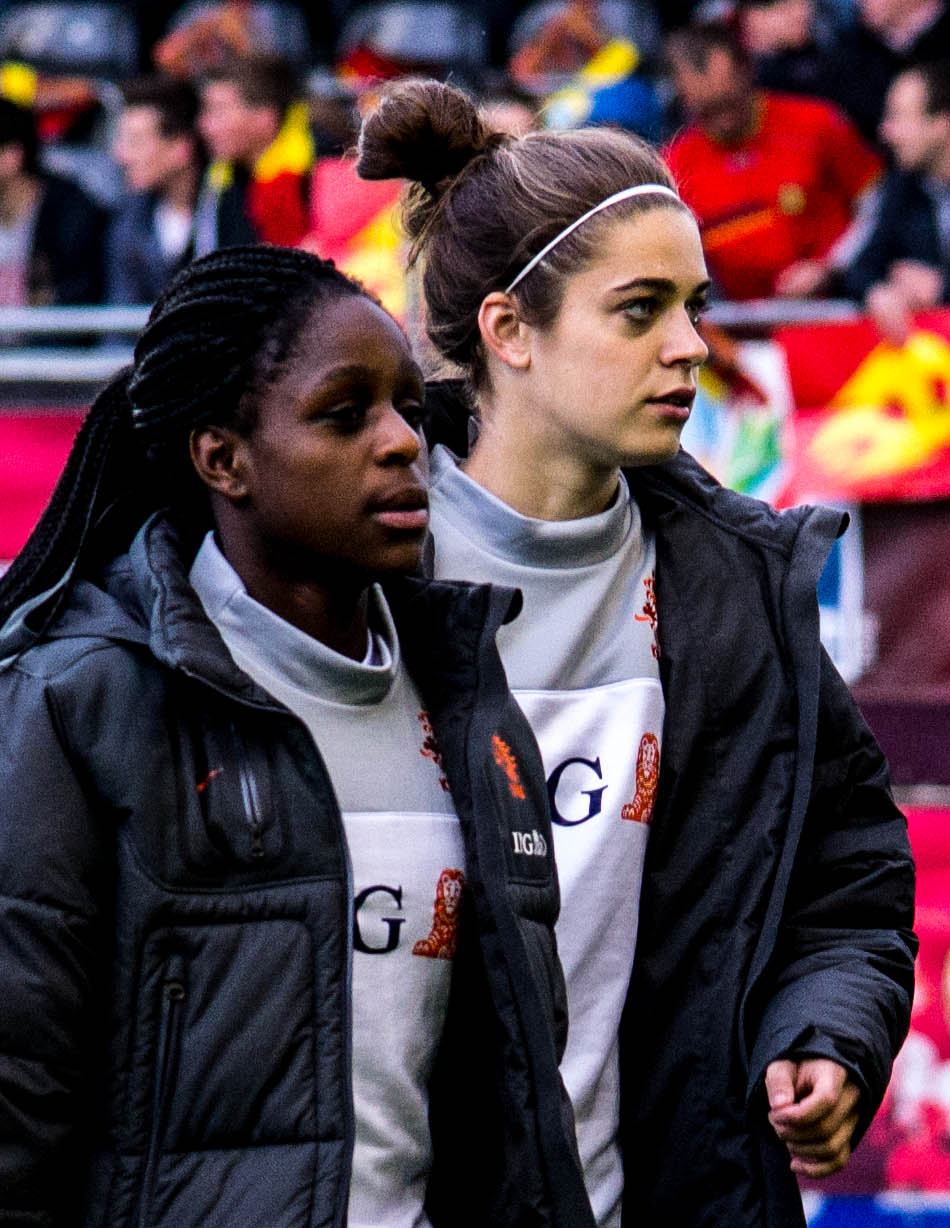
- Middag (right) and Liza van der Most in 2014

Personal information
- Full name: Tessel Tina Middag
- Date of birth: 23 December 1992 (age 33)
- Place of birth: Amsterdam, Netherlands
- Height: 1.76 m (5 ft 9 1/2 in)
- Position: Midfielder

Youth career
- Swift

Senior career*
Years	Team	Apps	(Gls)
2011–2012	ADO Den Haag	18	(10)
2012–2016	Ajax	94	(15)
2016–2018	Manchester City	14	(1)
2018–2020	West Ham United	13	(0)
2020–2021	Fiorentina	14	(2)
2021–2025	Rangers	61	(11)
2025–2026	Wellington Phoenix	1	(0)

International career
2007	Netherlands U15	2	(0)
2008	Netherlands U16	3	(0)
2007–2009	Netherlands U17	12	(0)
2010–2011	Netherlands U19	17	(0)
2012–2017	Netherlands	44	(4)
- * Club domestic league appearances and goals as of 24 November 2025 (UTC)

Tessel Tina Middag (Dutch pronunciation: [ˈtɛsəl ˈtinaː ˈmɪdɑx]; born 23 December 1992) is a Dutch footballer who last played as a midfielder for Wellington Phoenix in the A-League Women and the Dutch national team, representing the country at the 2015 FIFA Women's World Cup. She previously played for ADO Den Haag, AFC Ajax, Manchester City, West Ham United, and Fiorentina.

== Club career ==
=== ADO Den Haag ===
Middag joined ADO Den Haag in 2011. During her debut season, she scored ten goals in eighteen matches. Middag also won the Eredivisie and KNVB Women's Cup with ADO Den Haag.

=== Ajax ===
Middag signed with AFC Ajax in 2012. She made 94 appearances for the club, during which she scored 15 goals and again won the KNVB Women's Cup in 2014.

=== Manchester City ===
On 3 June 2016, Manchester City announced they had signed Middag. She made her debut for the club after being brought off the bench against Liverpool on 30 June and was voted Player of the Match by the Official Supporters Club. She made her first start for the club on 2 July against Aston Villa and scored a goal in the first half of match. In May 2017, Middag suffered an ACL injury during a Spring Series match against Reading. After nine months out, Middag made her return on 21 March 2018, entering as an 81st-minute substitute in a Champions League quarter-final against Linköpings FC. Middag left Manchester City at the end of the 2017–18 season upon the expiry of her contract having made three appearances in her final season with the team.

=== West Ham United ===
On 14 July 2018, Middag joined West Ham United. However, Middag but did not play during the 2018–19 season after sustaining a second ACL injury picked up while on international duty in summer 2018. Initially taking the #6 shirt, Middag changed to #23 ahead of the 2019–20 season having never worn #6. This was partly because the number had already been retired by the men's team in honour of Bobby Moore but also because it represented Middag's "fresh start" with the team following her long-term injury.

=== Fiorentina ===
On 30 July 2020, Middag signed for Serie A side Fiorentina.

=== Rangers ===
In August 2021, Middag joined Scottish club Rangers.

=== Wellington Phoenix ===
In June 2025, Middag joined A-League Women club Wellington Phoenix. In November 2025, Middag suffered a season-ending ACL rupture in her debut match against Canberra United. She played only 45 minutes for the club, assisting the team analyst off-pitch, and departed the club in June 2026, at the conclusion of her contract.

== International career ==
During 2010 and 2011, Middag made 17 appearances for the Netherlands U19 team. She broke into the senior squad in 2012, in a 2–1 friendly defeat by France. A member of the 31-player provisional squad for UEFA Women's Euro 2013, she was not selected for the final 23-player list. Middag was part of the Netherlands squad in the 2015 FIFA Women's World Cup.

=== International goals ===
Scores and results list the Netherlands goal tally first.

Goal	Date	Venue	Opponent	Score	Result	Competition
(1.)*	1 June 2012	Woezik, Wijchen, Netherlands	North Korea	4–1	4–1	Friendly
1.	5 April 2014	Pankritio Stadium, Heraklion, Greece	Greece	2–0	6–0	2015 FIFA Women's World Cup qualification
2.	7 February 2015	Polman Stadion, Almelo, Netherlands	Thailand	2–0	7–0	Friendly
3.	7 February 2015	Polman Stadion, Almelo, Netherlands	Thailand	6–0	7–0	Friendly
4.	24 November 2016	Eneco Stadion, Leuven, Belgium	Belgium	2–1	2–3	Friendly

* Note: Match not considered as an official friendly.

== Honours ==
ADO Den Haag

- Eredivisie: 2011–12
- KNVB Women's Cup: 2011–12

Ajax

- KNVB Women's Cup: 2013–14

Manchester City

- FA WSL: 2016
- FA WSL Cup: 2016

Rangers

- Scottish Women's Premier League: 2021–22
- Scottish Women's Premier League Cup: 2022
- City of Glasgow Woman's Cup: 2022
