= Natasha Flint =

English football player (born 1996)

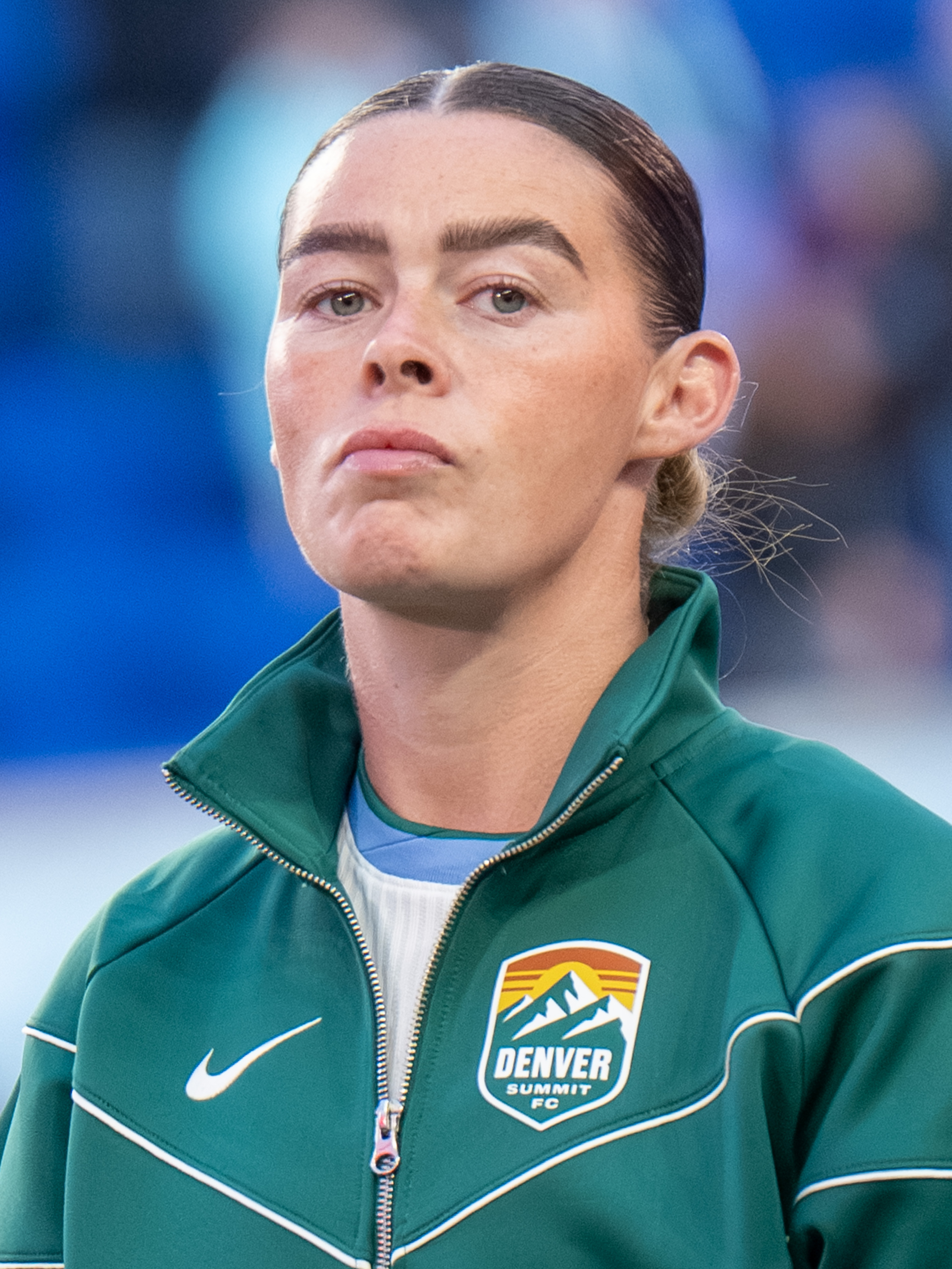
- Flint with the Denver Summit in 2026

Personal information
- Full name: Natasha Jane Flint
- Date of birth: 2 August 1996 (age 30)
- Place of birth: Salford, Greater Manchester, England
- Height: 1.74 m (5 ft 9 in)
- Positions: Forward; attacking midfielder

Team information
- Current team: Denver Summit
- Number: 26

Youth career
- 2001–2012: Manchester United
- 2012–2014: Manchester City

Senior career*
Years	Team	Apps	(Gls)
2014–2015	Manchester City	19	(2)
2015	Preston North End		
2016	Notts County Ladies	0	(0)
2016	Fylde		
2017	Sheffield		
2017	Fylde		
2017–2020	Blackburn Rovers	66	(70)
2020–2023	Leicester City	48	(20)
2023	→ Celtic (loan)	12	(7)
2023	Liverpool	2	(1)
2024	→ Celtic (loan)	14	(11)
2024–2026	Tampa Bay Sun	29	(10)
2026	→ Denver Summit (loan)	5	(1)
2026–	Denver Summit	23	(7)

International career
2012–2013	England U17	6	(4)
2013–2015	England U19	13	(6)
2014	England U20	1	(0)
2018	England U23	1	(0)
- * Club domestic league appearances and goals as of 06:36, 8 November 2026 (UTC)

Natasha Jane "Tash" Flint (born 2 August 1996) is an English professional footballer who plays as a forward or attacking midfielder for Denver Summit FC of the National Women's Soccer League (NWSL). She has represented England at the youth levels, playing at the 2014 FIFA U-20 Women's World Cup, as well as the UEFA Women's Under-19 Championship in 2013, 2014, and 2015, collecting a runners-up medal in 2013. She played as a teenager for Manchester City, with whom she won the FA Women's League Cup in 2014.

== Youth career ==
Born in the Lower Kersal area of Salford in Greater Manchester, Flint joined the Manchester United Centre of Excellence at age five. In 2013, she joined the Manchester City academy and by the following year, she was training with and traveling to camp with the senior team.

== Senior career ==
=== Manchester City ===
In March 2014, at age 17, Flint signed her first senior contract with Manchester City ahead of the club's first campaign in the Women's Super League. In July 2014, she scored a goal against Chelsea that was named a finalist for the 2014 FA WSL Goal of the Season, and in October, she was in the starting lineup when City won the 2014 Continental Cup (WSL Cup). However, a In October 2015, following a 2015 campaign with just one start and five substitute appearances in the 2015 FA WSL, Flint was released by Manchester City at age 19.

=== 2015–17 ===
Following her release from Manchester City, Flint signed with Preston North End (later renamed Fylde Ladies) in the FA Women's National League North, the third tier of English women's football in October 2015 and played the remainder of the year before signing with Notts County in the Super League. However, she left Notts County in March 2016, four days before the start of the 2016 FA WSL season citing "personal reasons" and signed with the renamed Fylde Ladies in June 2016. In January 2017, she signed with Sheffield F.C. in WSL 2 (now FA Women's Championship) before rejoining Fylde in July the same year.

=== Blackburn Rovers ===
In December 2017, Flint signed with Blackburn Rovers in the FA Women's National League, the third tier of women's football in England. In 2019, Flint helped Blackburn achieve their first-ever promotion to the FA Women's Championship and scored in the playoff final against Coventry United. Although she was limited to six games and nine goals in the 2019–20 campaign curtailed by the COVID-19 pandemic, she had amassed 70 goals in 66 matches over three seasons.

=== Leicester City ===
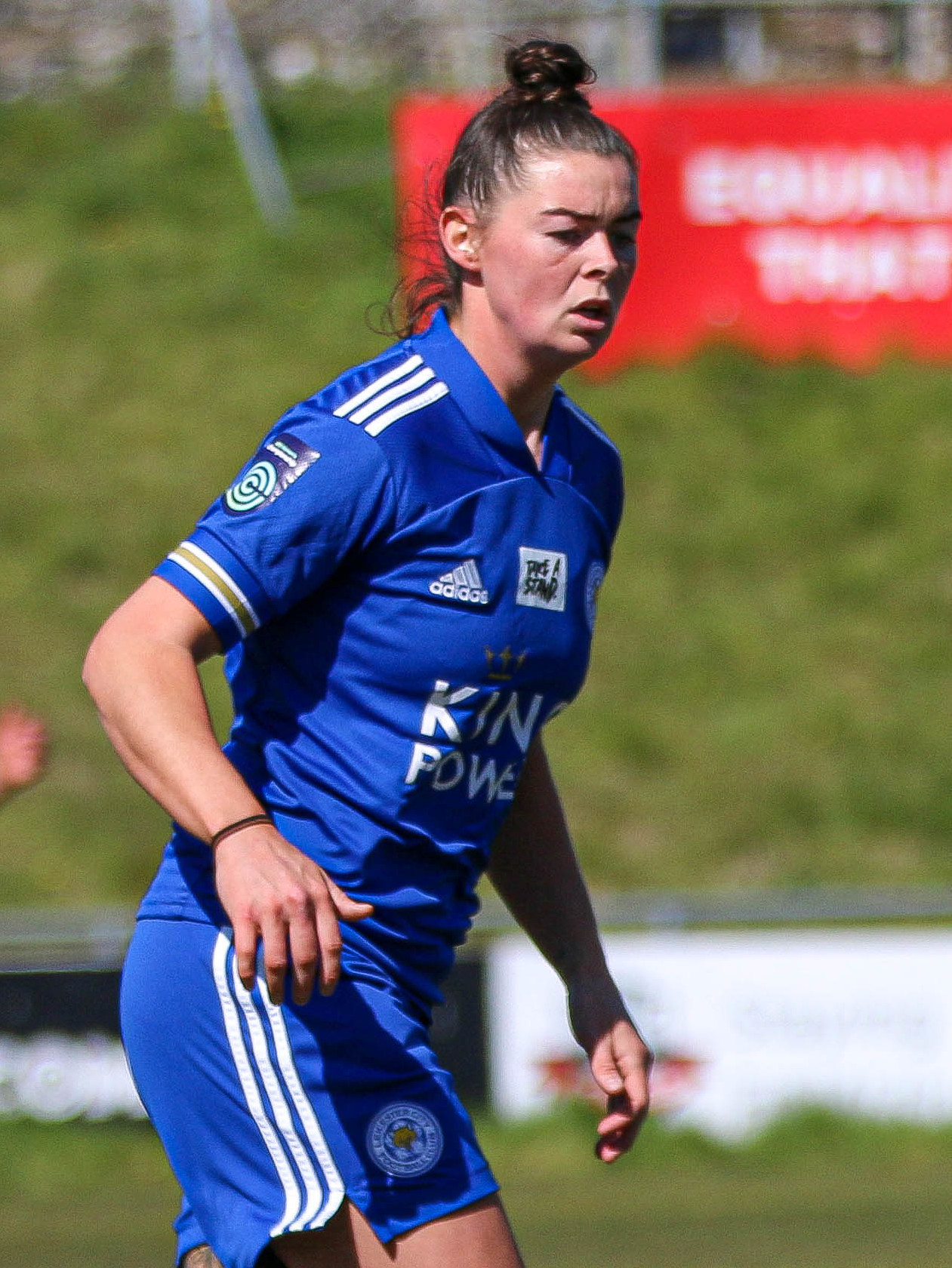
Flint playing for Leicester City in 2021

In June 2020, Flint left Blackburn at the conclusion of her contract and in August 2020, she signed with Leicester City Women, along with eleven other new players who were brought in as part of the women's club's conversion to a fully professional structure. She won the Women's Championship Player of the Month honours for December 2020 with four league goals during the month. On 4 April 2021, Flint scored the second Leicester goal in a 2–0 win over London City Lionesses, securing the 2020–21 season title and a promotion to the FA Women's Super League. Flint had previously worked part-time as a lab technician, but after losing the job to a COVID-19 pandemic-forced furlough, she moved to training full-time, a change that she has credited for her scoring form with Leicester.

She ended the 2020–21 Championship season as the club's top scorer with 17 goals in the competition. On 16 May 2021, Flint scored the winning goal in a 2–3 upset of Manchester United in the fifth round of the 2020–21 Women's FA Cup.

=== Celtic ===
Midway through the 2022–23, Flint joined Celtic on loan for the remainder of the season. She saw a successful loan spell scoring eight goals which helped Celtic capture the Scottish Cup and secure a place in the 2023–24 UEFA Women's Champions League.

=== Liverpool ===
In July 2023, Flint signed for Liverpool. After struggling to get regular games for Liverpool, she rejoined Celtic on loan for the rest of the 2023–24 season in January 2024.

=== Tampa Bay Sun ===
In June 2024, Flint joined Tampa Bay Sun ahead of the inaugural USL Super League season. She scored her first two goals for the Sun in November and was named to the league's team of the month. In the playoff semifinals, she equalized through a penalty in a 2–1 win over the Dallas Trinity. Tampa Bay won 1–0 in the final against cross-state rivals Fort Lauderdale United to become the inaugural league champions. Flint was named to the USL Super League All-League First Team.

=== Denver Summit ===
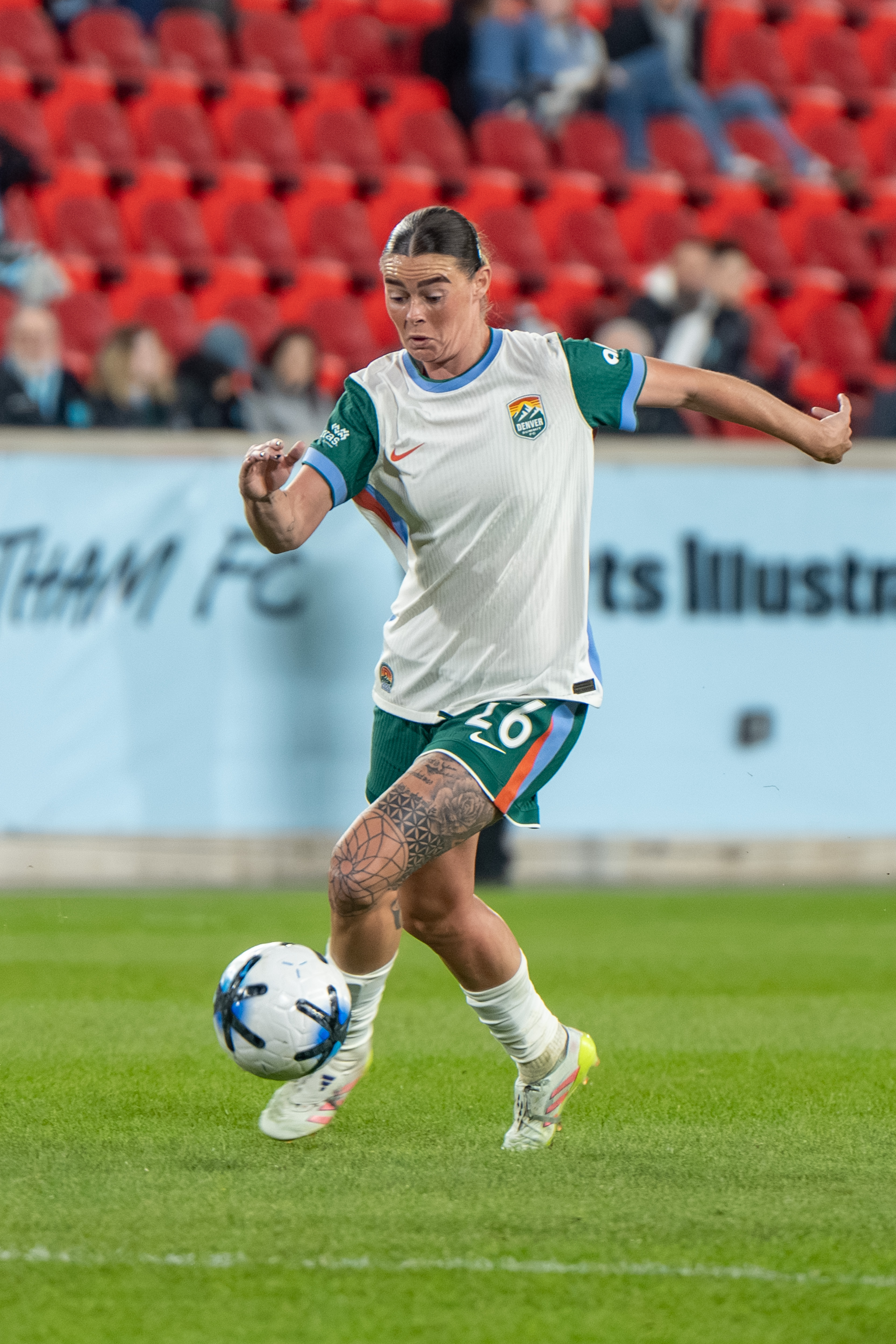
Flint with the Denver Summit in 2026

In January 2026, Flint joined National Women's Soccer League (NWSL) expansion club Denver Summit FC on loan through March with the option to buy, reuniting with former Manchester City head coach Nick Cushing, as the Summit loaned Faith Webber to the Sun. She made her NWSL debut on March 14 in the Summit's inaugural game, a 2–1 defeat away to Bay FC. Later that month, she scored her first NWSL goal in a 2–0 win over defending champions Gotham FC, the Summit's first-ever victory. On April 17, the club announced the permanent signing of Flint on a two-year contract.

== International career ==
Flint has represented England at youth levels and played at the 2013 UEFA Women's Under-19 Championship, where England under-19s reached the final, as well as the 2014 and the 2015 editions of the tournament, scoring a 40-yard goal against Spain in the latter. She also played for England under-20s at the 2014 FIFA U-20 Women's World Cup.

== Honours ==
Celtic

- Scottish Cup: 2023

Tampa Bay Sun

- USL Super League: 2024–25
