= Daphné Corboz =

Association football player (born 1993)

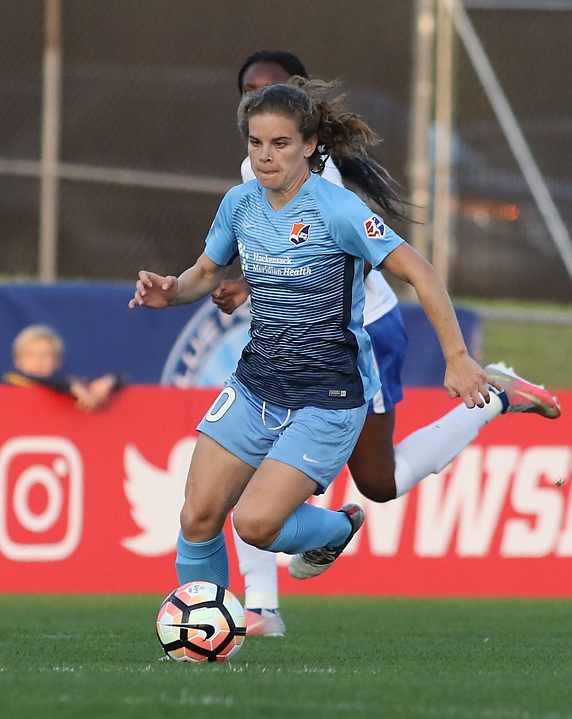
- Corboz playing for Sky Blue FC in 2017

Personal information
- Full name: Daphné Marie Corboz
- Date of birth: 14 June 1993 (age 33)
- Place of birth: Mobile, Alabama, United States
- Height: 1.57 m (5 ft 2 in)
- Position: Midfielder

Team information
- Current team: Paris FC
- Number: 8

Youth career
- PDA Tsunami
- 2007–2010: Watchung Hills HS
- 2013–2014: Pali Blues

College career
Years	Team	Apps	(Gls)
2011–2014	Georgetown Hoyas	82	(47)

Senior career*
Years	Team	Apps	(Gls)
2015–2016	Manchester City	20	(3)
2017–2018	Sky Blue FC	19	(1)
2017–2018	→ Fleury (loan)	18	(1)
2018–2020	Fleury	38	(6)
2020–	Paris FC	110	(10)

International career
2015	United States U23	5	(0)
2018–2019	France U23	7	(1)
- * Club domestic league appearances and goals as of 05:20, 13 June 2026 (UTC)

Daphné Marie Corboz (born 14 June 1993) is a professional footballer who plays as a midfielder for Première Ligue club Paris FC. Born in the United States, she represented them at youth level before switching her allegiance to France.

== Early life ==
Born to French-born parents, Michel and Christine, Corboz has a dual citizenship with France. She was born in Mobile, Alabama, where her father, a former semi-professional player in Grenoble, was pursuing his postdoctoral research at the University of South Alabama. Her younger brother, Mael played soccer for Rutgers before transferring to Maryland, and she was teammates at Georgetown with younger sister Rachel, who is three years her junior.

== College career ==
Corboz had a four-year career with the Georgetown University women's soccer team, with whom she was a three-time All-America selection by the National Soccer Coaches Association of America, including first-team honors in 2012 after her sophomore season. She finished her college career with 47 goals, a school record. Before Georgetown, she attended Watchung Hills Regional High School in New Jersey and played club soccer with PDA Tsunami.

== Club career ==
She was accepted to medical school at Rutgers University near her home in New Jersey and was chosen by Sky Blue FC, her hometown club, with the 22nd pick in the 2015 NWSL College Draft in January 2015. She eventually chose to postpone medical school and signed with Manchester City.

=== Manchester City ===
Corboz signed for Manchester City in July 2015. Corboz made her FA WSL debut on 12 July 2015, coming on as a second-half substitute against Birmingham City. She scored her first goal for Manchester City the following weekend in a 3–0 win over Bristol Academy. On 25 November 2016, Corboz announced that she was leaving Manchester City.

=== Sky Blue FC ===
Corboz signed for Sky Blue FC in January 2017.

==== Fleury (loan) ====
After completing her first season with Sky Blue FC, Corboz joined French club FC Fleury 91 on loan during the 2017–18 NWSL offseason.

=== Fleury ===
Following a successful loan spell, Corboz signed to remain at FC Fleury. She extended her contract for a further year in 2019.

=== Paris FC ===
On 23 June 2020, it was announced that Corboz had left FC Fleury 91 to join rivals Paris FC. She signed a contract with the Parisian club for two seasons.

== International career ==
Corboz was called up to the United States Under-23 team in late 2014 and played at the 2015 Four Nations Tournament in Norway.

While on loan at FC Fleury 91, Corboz was called up to a training camp with the France B national team in November 2017. On 15 January 2018, Corboz was called up to the France women's national football team for the first time as an injury replacement to Sandie Toletti. She was again called up as an injury replacement on 5 November 2018.

== Honours ==
Manchester City

- FA WSL: 2016
- FA WSL Cup: 2016
