= Amy Fearn =

English football referee

Amy Fearn MBE
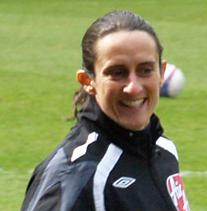
- Fearn in 2009
- Full name: Amy Elizabeth Fearn
- Born: 20 November 1977 (age 48); Loughborough, England

Domestic
Years	League	Role
2004–	Football Conference	Referee
2005–	Football League	Assistant Referee

International
Years	League	Role
2004–	FIFA listed	Referee

Amy Elizabeth Fearn MBE (née Rayner; born 20 November 1977) is an English football referee from Loughborough, Leicestershire, who in 2010 became the first woman to referee in The Football League. With a degree in economics and a full-time career in accountancy, having also refereed football since age 14, she became only the second woman after Wendy Toms to rise to the position of assistant referee in English professional football. On 9 February 2010, she became the first woman to act as the main referee in a Football League match.

== Career ==
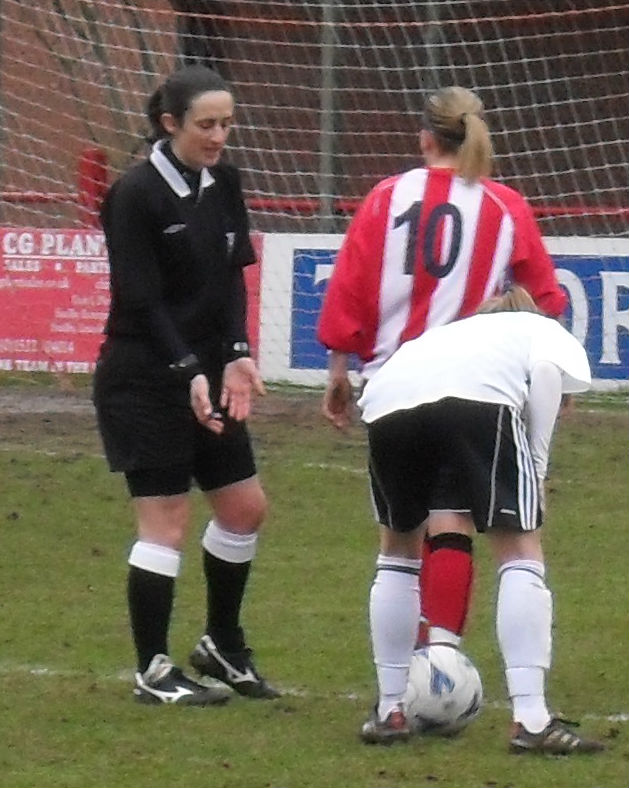
Fearn awards a free kick (2010)

She grew up in Staffordshire, where, as a girl, she expressed a desire to play football with her brother. However, she grew frustrated at the lack of opportunities to play because no girls' football facilities were available at the time. When she was 13, her father went on a course to gain a qualification as a referee, something which inspired Fearn to do the same. She qualified just after her 14th birthday. Being under 16 meant she could only referee those at under 12 level, something which she did for two years. When she became 16, the restriction was lifted, and she began refereeing in the Midland Football Alliance before being promoted to the Football Conference, aged 26. Around this time, she was given responsibilities as an assistant referee, also being appointed to the FIFA assistants' list in 2005. She balances her football officiating duties with a full-time job as a Management Accountant for Santander in Leicester. In 2006, aged 28, she expressed a desire to move up to the Football League.

On 9 February 2010, Fearn became the first woman to take full control of a Football League match as the match referee. The original referee Tony Bates suffered a calf strain, and Fearn, as senior assistant on the day took over for the last 20 minutes of Coventry's 1-0 Championship win over Nottingham Forest at the Ricoh Arena.

In 2013, she became the first woman to referee an FA Cup Game in the Main Draw.

Fearn was appointed Member of the Order of the British Empire (MBE) in the 2023 Birthday Honours for services to association football.

== Criticism by managers ==
=== Mike Newell ===
In November 2006, Luton Town manager Mike Newell made controversial comments about Fearn, then known as Amy Rayner, who was the assistant in their game against Queens Park Rangers, which Luton lost 3–2. Angry with the official's decision not to award Luton a penalty, Newell said "She shouldn't be here. I know that sounds sexist but I am sexist. This is not park football, so what are women doing here?". The FA promised to investigate, with Neale Barry saying "English football needs more Amy Rayners". Newell later apologised, saying, "My apology to Amy Rayner, and to anyone I've offended, is unreserved. I was out of order and she has accepted it". Newell was fined £6,500 and given a warning by his club.

=== Casey Stoney ===
On 19 March 2021, Fearn refereed the match between Arsenal and Manchester United in the FA WSL, with her performance being criticised by United manager Casey Stoney. The BBC Sport website reported: "Stoney believed her players - Lauren James in particular - were the victims of overly aggressive tackles by Arsenal and criticised referee Amy Fearn, who sent off Gunners forward Beth Mead shortly after the hour mark for a second bookable offence. In a post-match interview to BT Sport, she "How you can have somebody fouled and fouled and fouled and fouled and we do nothing? I thought the referee was atrocious at best tonight and that's not an excuse for my team losing but we've got to improve the officiating in this league, we really have to because if Lauren James reacts to any of those she ends up off the pitch. She gets no protection. It's so disappointing".
