= Academy Stadium =

Football stadium in Manchester, England

- MiniCOMS, Minihad
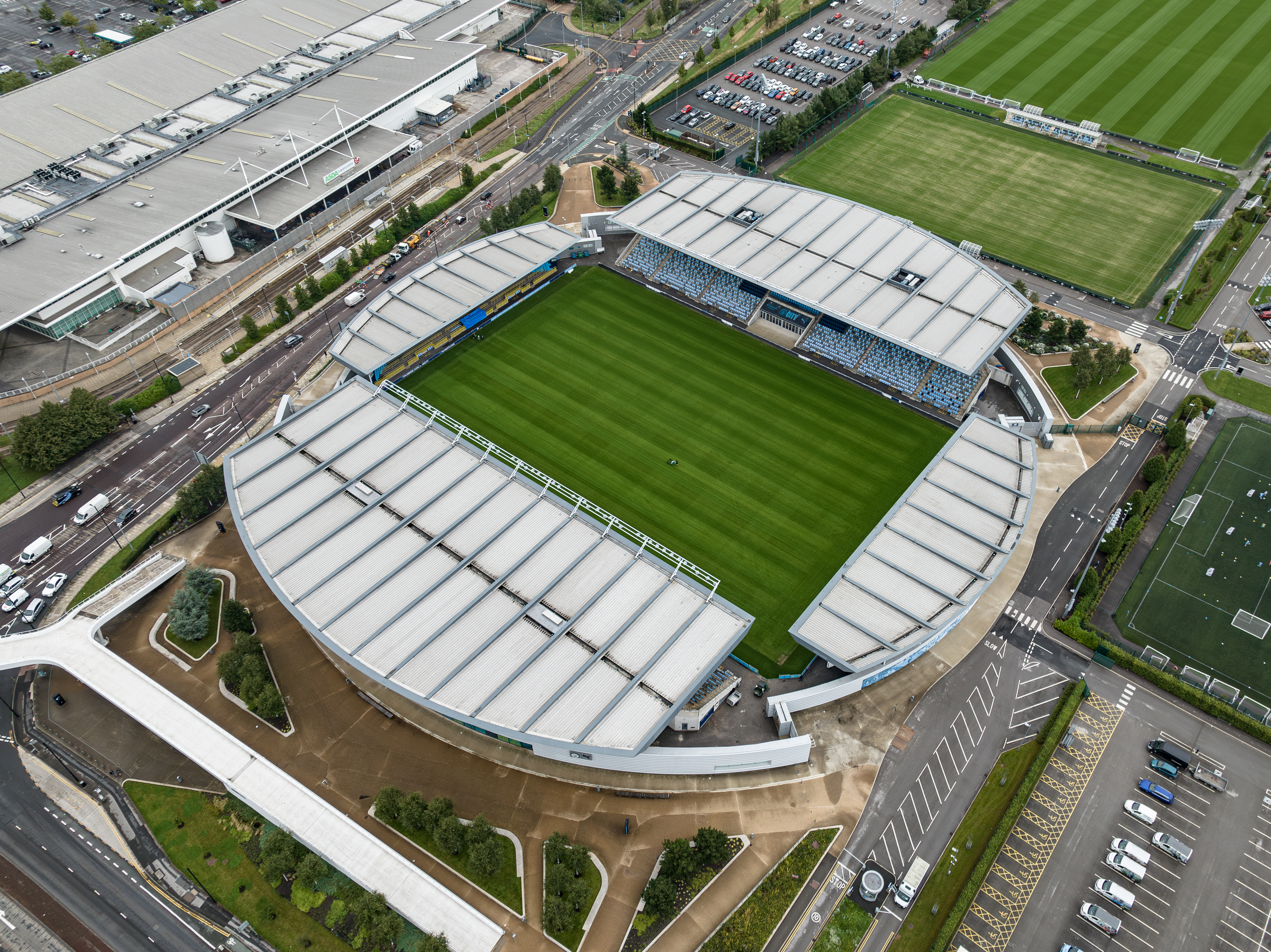
- Full name: Manchester City Academy Stadium
- Location: Sportcity, Manchester, England
- Coordinates: 53°28′52″N 2°11′34″W
- Owner: Manchester City F.C.
- Operator: Manchester City F.C.
- Capacity: 4,998 seats (7,000 overall)
- Surface: Natural grass

Construction
- Opened: 8 December 2014
- Cost: £200 million (total value of training facilities)
- Architect: Rafael Vinoly
- Main contractor: BAM Construction

Tenants
- Manchester City F.C. EDS and Academy; Manchester City W.F.C.

The Academy Stadium is a football stadium in Manchester, England, forming part of the Etihad Campus. In September 2023, the ground was renamed Joie Stadium for sponsorship reasons. Announced on 19 September 2011 as part of an 80-acre training facility to cater for around 400 youth players at a time, the campus was opened on 8 December 2014. The stadium, known simply as Academy Stadium, was inaugurated by students of the Manchester Metropolitan University, who played the first official games on the pitch on 14 December 2014. Academy Stadium is home to the men's Elite Development Squad and other senior academy teams, as well as to Manchester City Women, who also play select matches at the City of Manchester Stadium.

Although not the biggest building of the facility, the Academy Stadium still features numerous facilities more common to larger stadia, including a press room, board room, offices and retail space. Situated only 400 metres from the City of Manchester Stadium, the Academy Stadium is linked to the mother ground via a 190-metre bridge across the intersection of Ashton New Road and Alan Turing Way.

In 2016, it was used as one of the two venues for that year's World Rugby Under 20 Championship in rugby union. In 2022, it hosted some group stage matches during the UEFA Women's Euro.

== UEFA Women's Euro 2022 ==
The stadium was one of the ten venues used at the UEFA Women's Euro 2022, hosting Group D games alongside the New York Stadium. The choice of the Academy Stadium as a host venue was criticised by Iceland's Sara Björk Gunnarsdóttir who called it a "training ground" in comparison to the other larger stadiums that were selected and viewed it as "disrespectful towards women's football".

Date	Home	Away	Result	Attendance	Stage
10 July 2022	Belgium	Iceland	1–1	3,859	UEFA Women's Euro 2022 Group D
14 July 2022	Italy	Iceland	1–1	4,029	UEFA Women's Euro 2022 Group D
18 July 2022	Italy	Belgium	0–1	3,919	UEFA Women's Euro 2022 Group D
