= Kathleen Radtke =

German footballer

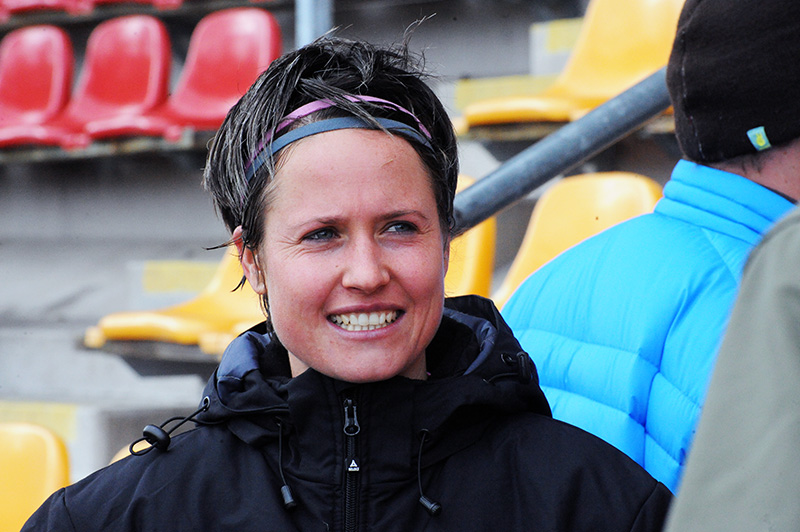
- Radtke in 2014

Personal information
- Date of birth: 31 January 1985 (age 41)
- Place of birth: Köthen, Germany
- Height: 1.60 m (5 ft 3 in)
- Positions: Midfielder; defender

Youth career
- 1990–1996: VfB Gröbzig
- 1996–1997: CFC Germania Köthen
- 1997–2002: Hallescher FC

Senior career*
Years	Team	Apps	(Gls)
2002–2004	1. FFC Turbine Potsdam		
2004–2005	CFC Germania Köthen		
2005–2009	1. FC Lokomotive Leipzig	63	(15)
2009–2013	FF USV Jena	68	(3)
2013–2014	FC Rosengård	28	(5)
2014–2016	Manchester City	16	(0)
2016–2020	MSV Duisburg	61	(8)
- * Club domestic league appearances and goals as of 15:25 25 November 2018 (UTC)

Kathleen Radtke (born 31 January 1985) is a former German footballer. She last played as a defender for MSV Duisburg.

== Early life ==
Radtke studied sports psychology at the Friedrich-Schiller-University Jena until her move to Sweden in the spring of 2013.

== Club career ==
Radtke began her career in 1990 with VfB Gröbzig. She then played for the youth teams of CFC Germania Köthen and Hallescher FC where she has named 2001 Sportswoman of the Year. During the 2002/2003 season, she played for the youth academy of 1. FFC Turbine Potsdam and then joined the youth club, CFC Germania Köthen, in 2004. During the 2005/2006 season, she returned to professional football and signed with FC Lok Leipzig. In the summer of 2009, Radtke joined FF USV Jena in the Frauen Bundesliga. On 7 February 2013 she announced her move to the FC Rosengård (formerly LdB FC Malmö) in the Swedish Damallsvenskan, her first experience of full-time professional football.

Having become one of the first three Germans to win the Swedish women's league title, on 3 July 2014 Radtke moved to England to join WSL newcomers Manchester City.

== Honours ==
=== Club ===
1. FFC Turbine Potsdam

- Bundesliga: 2004
- DFB-Pokal: 2004

FC Rosengård

- Damallsvenskan: 2013

Manchester City

- Women's League Cup: 2014
