= Karen Bardsley =

American-born footballer (born 1984)

- Bardsley with the Denver Summit in 2026

Personal information
- Full name: Karen Louise Bardsley
- Date of birth: 14 October 1984 (age 42)
- Place of birth: Santa Monica, California, United States
- Height: 6 ft 0 in (1.82 m)
- Position: Goalkeeper

College career
Years	Team	Apps	(Gls)
2002–2006	Cal State Fullerton Titans		

Senior career*
Years	Team	Apps	(Gls)
2007	Ajax America Women		
2008	Pali Blues	5	(0)
2009–2011	Sky Blue FC	17	(0)
2011–2012	Linköpings FC	3	(0)
2013	Lincoln	14	(0)
2014–2022	Manchester City	102	(0)
2021	→ OL Reign (loan)	3	(0)
Total		144	(0)

International career
- England U19
- England U21
2005–2021	England	82	(0)
2012	Great Britain	5	(0)
Medal record
Women's football
Representing England
FIFA Women's World Cup
Bronze medal – third place	2015 Canada
- * Club domestic league appearances and goals

Karen Louise Bardsley (born 14 October 1984) is an American-born English former footballer who played as a goalkeeper. She is currently the goalkeeping coach of Denver Summit FC of the National Women's Soccer League (NWSL).

She played for Sky Blue FC in the previous top-flight American Women's Professional Soccer league, Linköpings FC in the Swedish Damallsvenskan, Lincoln Ladies and Manchester City in the FA WSL and OL Reign in the NWSL. She played for the England national team and Great Britain internationally.

== Early life ==
Born in Santa Monica, California, to English parents, Bardsley grew up in the Los Angeles suburb of Chino Hills and began playing football at five years old. She attended Ayala High School and played for the girls' varsity soccer team for two years. During her junior year, she broke her left leg during college recruitment time resulting in some programs reportedly being concerned about her recovery. As a senior, she earned All-Sierra League honours and helped lead the team to win the league championship and reach the quarterfinals of the state playoffs. She was named the Sierra League Most Valuable Player (MVP) the same year. Bardsley also ran track, threw javelin at an Olympic level and was a member of the Olympic Development Program at the regional, state, and national levels.

== College career ==
Bardsley attended California State University, Fullerton as a graphic design major and played for the Titans women's soccer team. Following her first season in 2002, she was named the Big West Conference Freshman of the Year after recording 88 saves with an .846 (84.6%) save percentage. The following season, she played just 28 minutes before a broken leg during the Portland Nike Invitational and redshirted the 2003 season. Despite missing eight games during the 2004 season due to injury recovery, Bardsley earned All-Big West First Team honours and was named Big West Conference Goalkeeper of the Year for the first of three consecutive seasons. Her 0.71 goals against average ranked third in the league.

In 2005, Bardsley was named Big West Conference Goalkeeper of the Year and to the All-Big West First Team for the second consecutive season and set new single-season program records for goals against average (0.64), victories, and shutouts (10). Her goals against average ranked 21st in the country and first in the Big West Conference. During her senior season, she was named Big West Conference Goalkeeper of the Year for the third consecutive time and was named to the First-Team All-Big West Conference team. She started all 22 matches and recorded a 12–8–2 record, including eight shutouts. Bardsley was named Player of the Week by the Big West Conference twice during the season. Her 1.02 goals against average ranked fourth all-time at the school and her 128 saves ranked second in school history.

== Club career ==
=== Sky Blue FC, 2009–11 ===
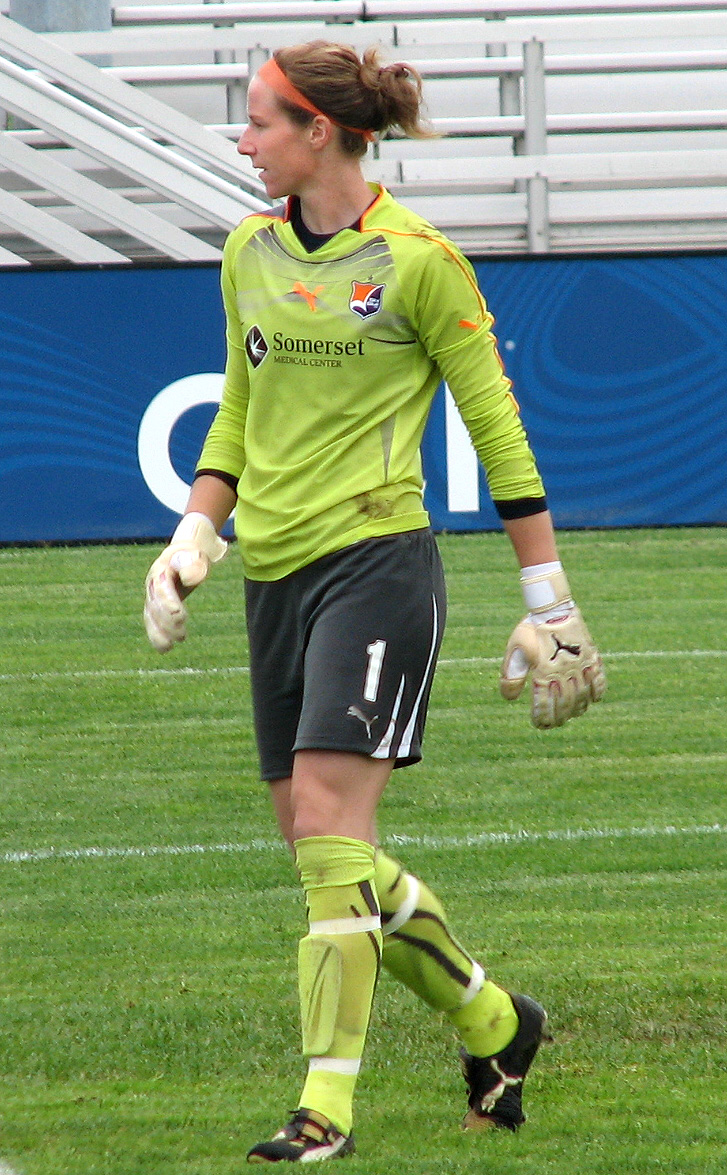
Bardsley guarding the Sky Blue goal, 2010.

After college, Bardsley joined Ajax America Women for the 2007 WPSL season and played for Pali Blues during the 2008 W-League season. The team went undefeated 14–0 and won the league championship.

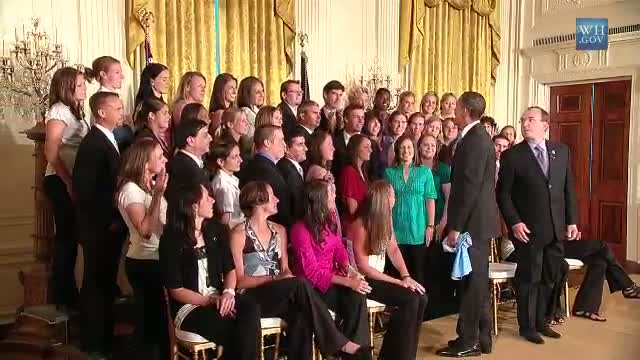
Bardsley (top row, second from left) with Sky Blue at the White House, July 2010.

Bardsley was selected by Sky Blue FC as a third-round pick in the 2009 WPS Draft ahead of the inaugural season of the Women's Professional Soccer (WPS) league. She competed in four games for the club in their 2009 season. Sky Blue finished the regular season in fourth place with a 7–8–5 record and advanced to the 2009 Women's Professional Soccer Playoffs where they defeated the Washington Freedom 2–1 and Saint Louis Athletica 1–0 during the semi-final. After a 1–0 win against the Los Angeles Sol, the team clinched the league championship and were later invited to the White House to be honoured by President Barack Obama.

During the 2010 WPS season, Bardsley competed in 10 matches recording 900 minutes in goal. During a match against the Atlanta in May 2010, she made 13 saves helping the team win 1–0. Sky Blue head coach Pauliina Miettinen reveled, "As a team, it gives you a huge confidence boost when you know that you will get such a high level of play by your goalkeeper." She was named the WPS Player of the Month the same month. During a training session in July 2010, Bardsley injured her clavicle when she led the league with five shutouts and a .90 goals against average (GAA). The team finished in fifth place with a 7–10–7 record narrowly missing the WPS Playoffs.

During the 2011 WPS season, Bardsley competed in only three matches for Sky Blue largely due to her 2011 FIFA Women's World Cup commitments with the England national team. Sky Blue finished in fifth place with a 5–9–4 record.

=== Linköpings FC, 2011–12 ===
In August 2011, Bardsley joined Swedish club Linköpings FC. With Linköpings, Bardsley made three Damallsvenskan appearances in 2011, but none in 2012 as Sofia Lundgren remained the first choice goalkeeper. During the 2011 season, the team finished in sixth place with a 9–5–8 record. During the 2012 season, it finished in third place with a 11–5–6 record.

=== Lincoln, 2013 ===
Bardsley announced a transfer to Lincoln Ladies of the FA WSL in November 2012 ahead of the 2013 FA WSL season. She was the starting goalkeeper in all 14 matches. The team finished in sixth place with a 2–8–4 record.

=== Manchester City, 2013–2022 ===
Bardsley moved at the end of the 2013 season to Manchester City on a two-year deal. Her two-year City stint started successfully, playing a pivotal role in the club winning the 2014 Women's League Cup. In March 2015, Bardsley was given a three-match ban for violent conduct in a 0–0 draw with Birmingham City after a fight with opposition forward Freda Ayisi. Ayisi was expelled from the match immediately by the referee's red card. She later stated, "Passions ran high against Birmingham. Viewing the footage again, I regret the incident with Freda Ayisi. Whilst I was provoked, it was out of character for me to react in that way. I've contacted Birmingham to apologise for my involvement."

During the 2017–18 and 2018–19 seasons, despite being first choice in the England national side, Bardsley lost her starting position for Manchester City to English teenager Ellie Roebuck. At the start of the following season, it was announced that Bardsley would miss the 2019 Women's International Champions Cup due to a hamstring injury.

She made her 100th appearance in a Women's League Cup match against Liverpool in November 2020. On 2 May 2022, Bardsley announced her retirement, after suffering a long-term injury that forced her to withdraw from Great Britain's squad during the delayed 2020 Tokyo Olympics. She won eight major trophies with Manchester City.

== International career ==
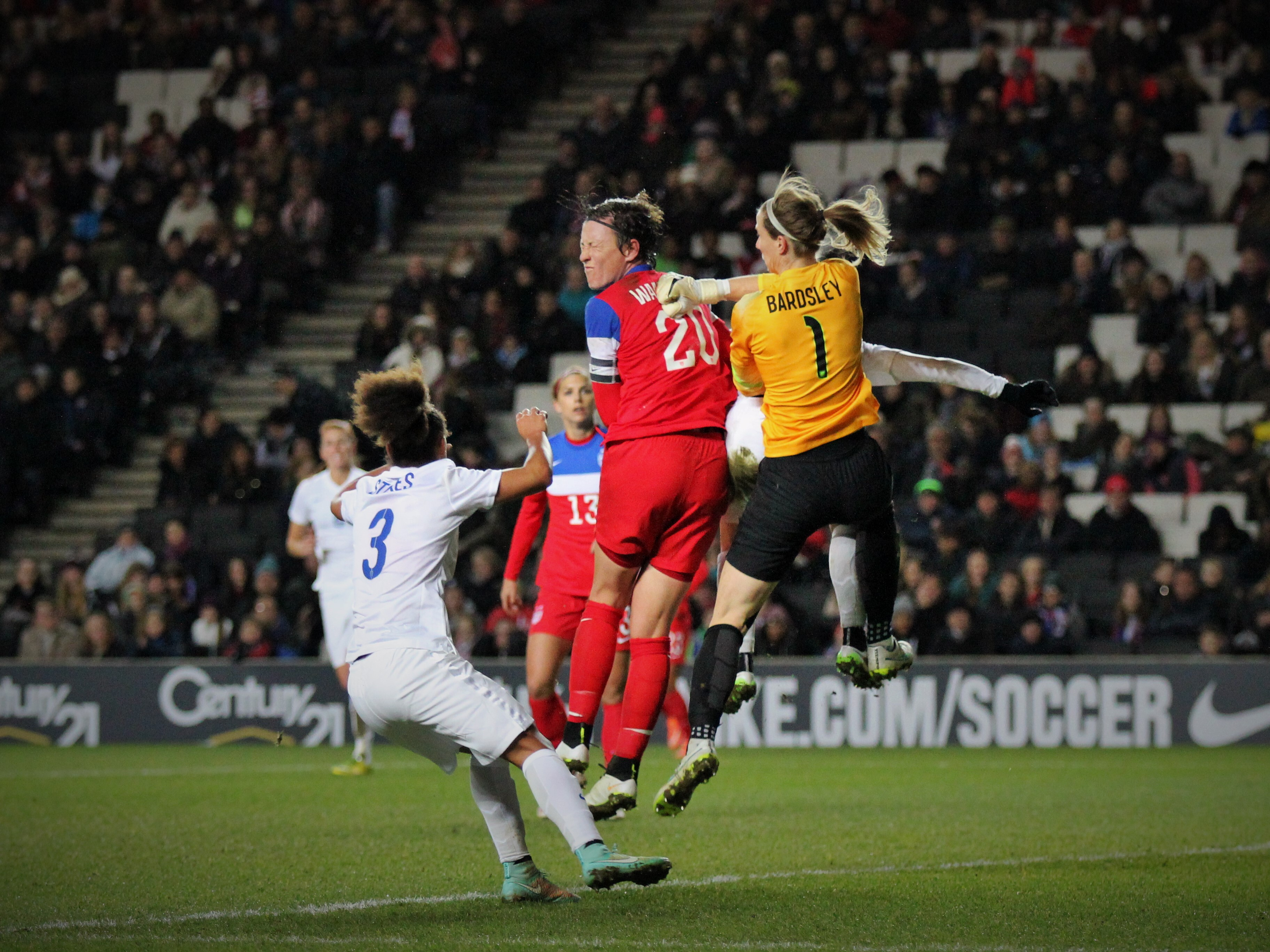
Bardsley defends against Abby Wambach during a match against the United States, February 2015.

Despite being born in the United States, as a dual citizen, Bardsley decided to represent England due to family connections in Stockport. She appeared for the England U-19s in the 2003 UEFA Women's Under-19 Championship. She made her senior debut in the Algarve Cup in March 2005, where England beat Northern Ireland 4–0. In August 2009, she was named to coach Hope Powell's squad for UEFA Women's Euro 2009.

=== 2011 FIFA Women's World Cup ===
By the 2011 FIFA Women's World Cup in Germany, Bardsley had taken over the national team's first choice goalkeeping position from Rachel Brown. After England's 1–1 opening group match draw with Mexico, coach Powell reported that Bardsley was "devastated" following the concession of a long-range equaliser to Mónica Ocampo. In England's quarter final exit to France, Bardsley saved the first penalty in the shootout, but misses from Claire Rafferty and Faye White sent England home.

=== 2012 Summer Olympics ===
In June 2012, Bardsley was named in the 18–player Great Britain squad for the 2012 London Olympics. She played in all four games as Great Britain were beaten 2–0 by Canada in the last eight.

=== UEFA Women's Euro 2013 ===
At UEFA Women's Euro 2013, England lost 3–2 to Spain in their opening game, when Spain scored a 94th-minute goal, and were knocked out in the first round. Hope Powell was sacked in the wake of that failure but new coach Mark Sampson continued to select Bardsley.

=== 2015 FIFA Women's World Cup ===
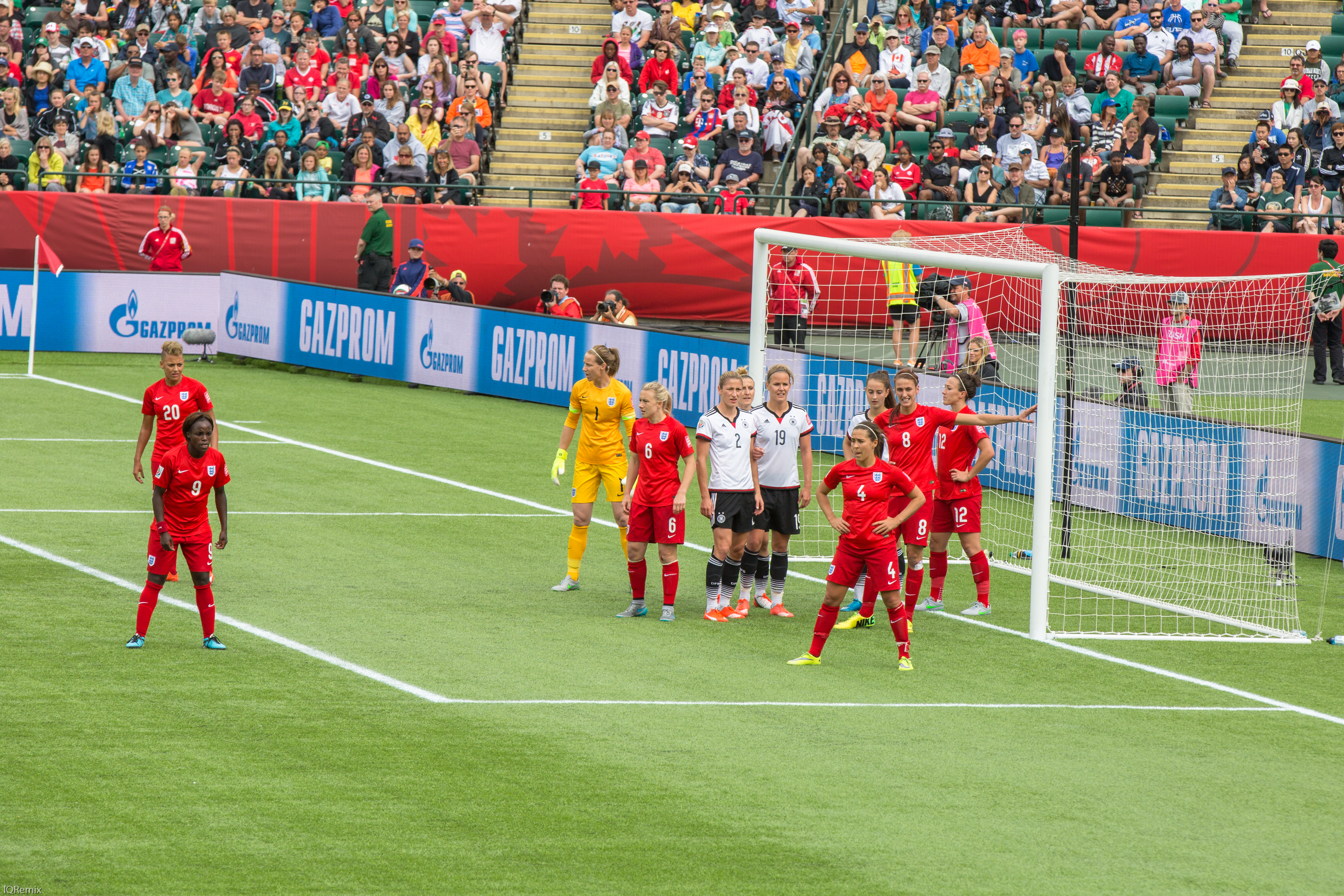
Bardsley defends England's goal against Germany during the 2015 FIFA Women's World Cup, July 2015

In May 2015, Bardsley was named to England's final squad for the 2015 FIFA Women's World Cup, hosted in Canada. Bardsley had previously played as goalkeeper in all five games and was part of the history-making team which beat Norway in the round of 16 to become the first senior England women's team to win a World Cup knockout match. She was substituted in the 51st minute of the quarter-final match against Canada, after suffering an inflammation of her right eye; she was immediately taken off pitch with her eye visibly swollen and was substituted with Siobhan Chamberlain. The reasoning for the swelling was unknown, but parts of the artificial turf were suspected.

=== UEFA Women's Euro 2017 ===
Bardsley played in England's first two group games (against Scotland and Spain) but was rested in the final group game against Portugal. She suffered a fractured fibula in England's quarter-final against France and did not take any further part in the tournament.

=== 2019 FIFA Women's World Cup ===
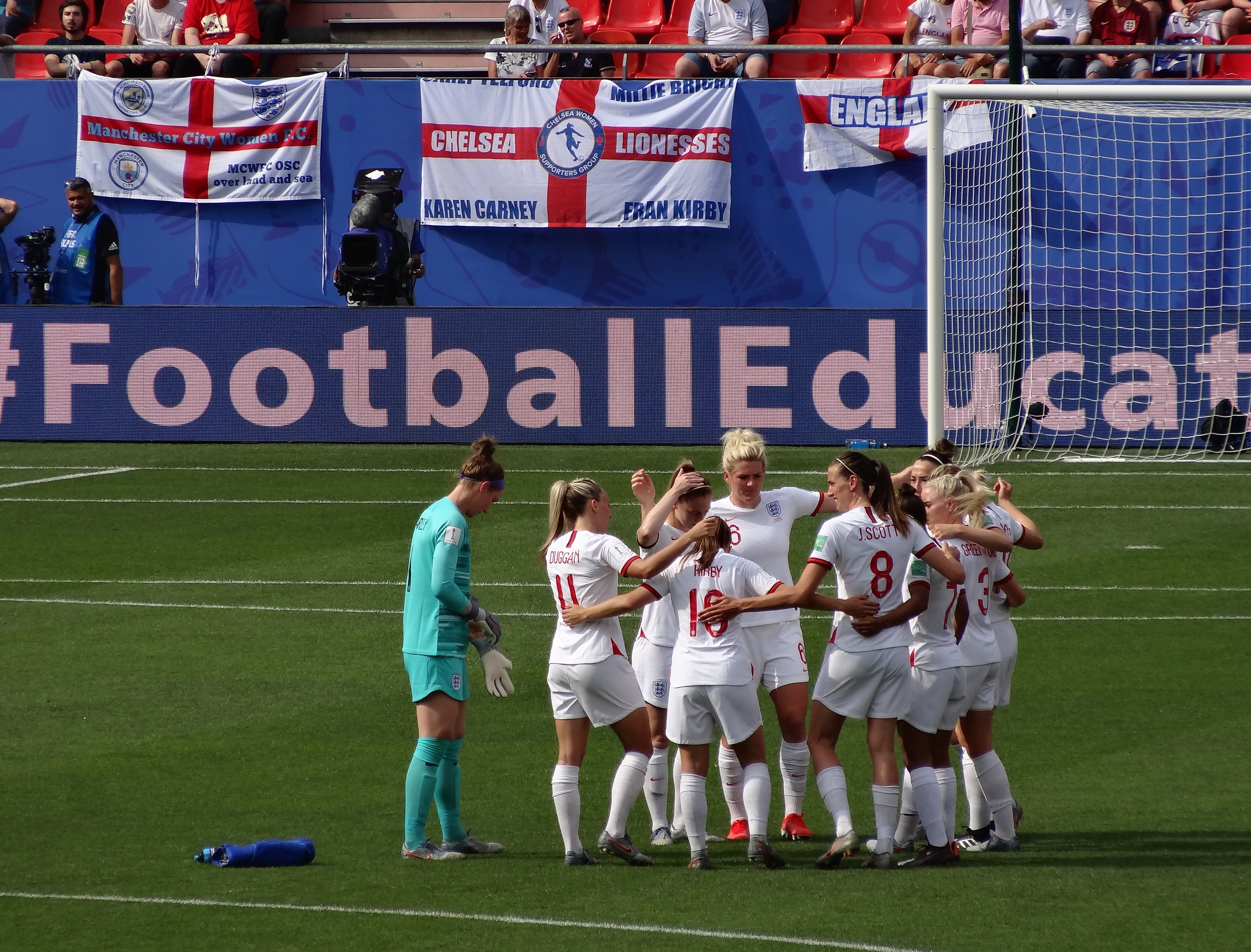
Bardsley with her England teammates at the 2019 FIFA Women's World Cup.

On 8 May 2019, she was named in the squad for the 2019 FIFA Women's World Cup. She played in two of the matches in the group stage, against Scotland and Japan. She played in the round of 16 against Cameroon and in the quarter-final against Norway.

=== Legacy ===
Bardsley was given number 161 when the FA announced their legacy numbers scheme to honour the 50th anniversary of England's inaugural international.

== Coaching career ==
Bardsley began coaching as a volunteer coach at her alma mater, California State University, Fullerton, before being employed as an assistant coach with the University of San Diego. She graduated with a Master's degree in Sports Directorship at the Manchester Metropolitan University in July 2019.

In December 2023, she was appointed manager of the Manchester City's Girls' Academy. In 2026, she would join Denver Summit FC to be a member of Nick Cushing's coaching staff, working as the team's goalkeeping coach.

== Honours ==
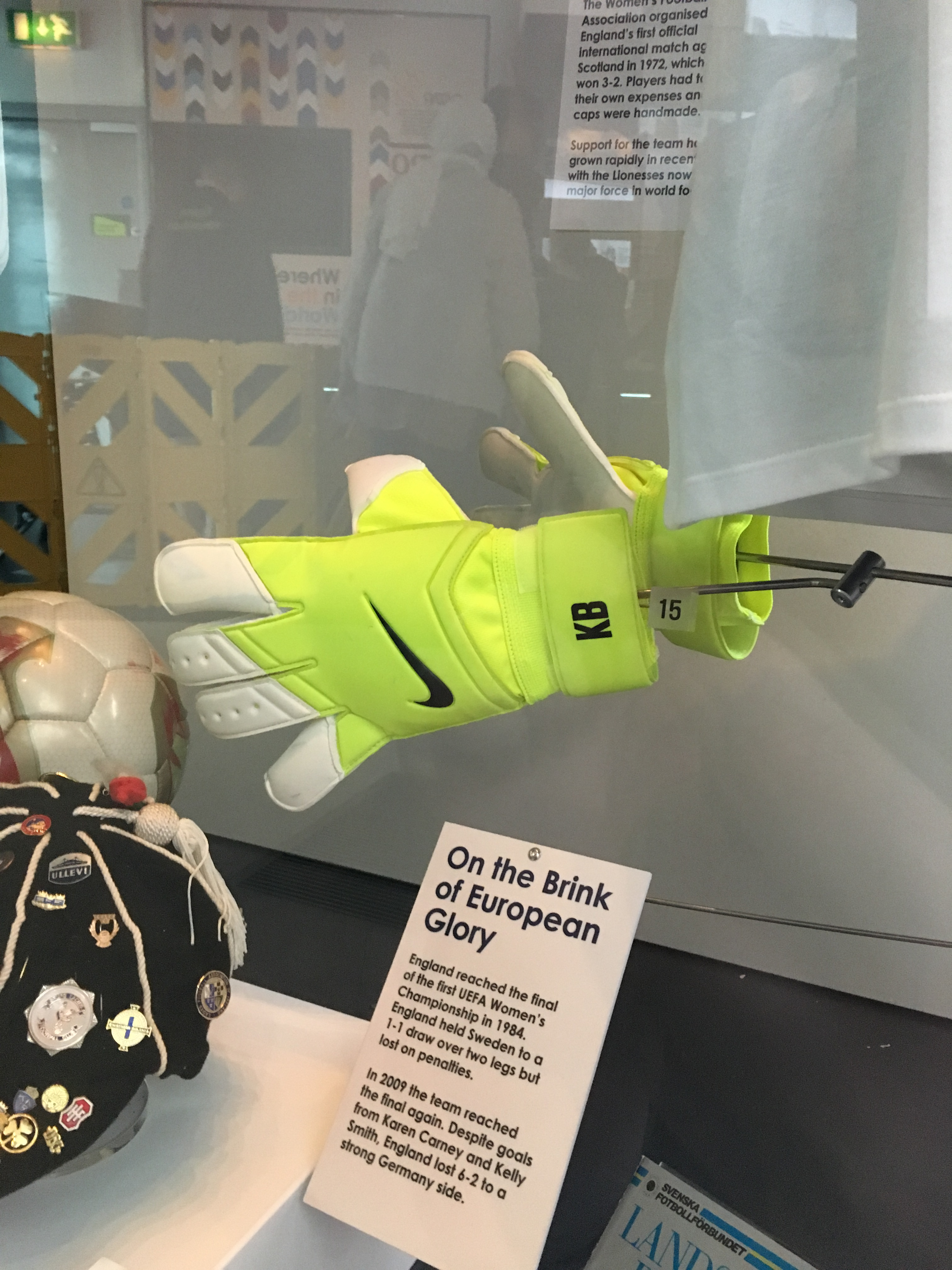
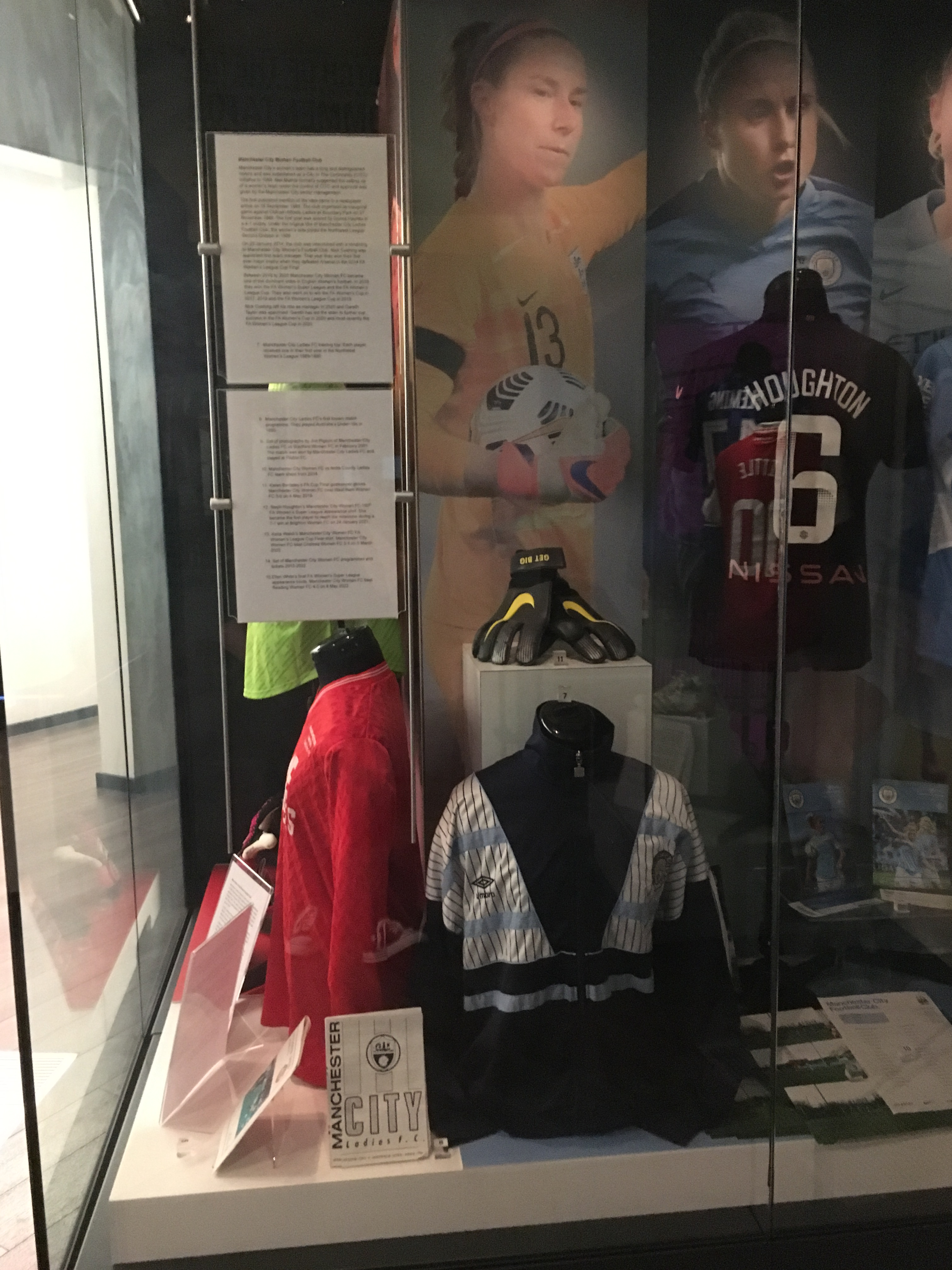
Bardsley's England (left photo) and Manchester City gloves on display at the National Football Museum

Manchester City

- FA WSL: 2016
- Women's League Cup: 2014, 2016, 2018–19, 2021–22
- Women's FA Cup: 2016–17, 2018–19, 2019–20

England

- UEFA Women's Championship runner-up: 2009
- Cyprus Women's Cup: 2013, 2015
- FIFA Women's World Cup third place: 2015
- SheBelieves Cup: 2019
