= Izzy Christiansen =

English footballer (born 1991)

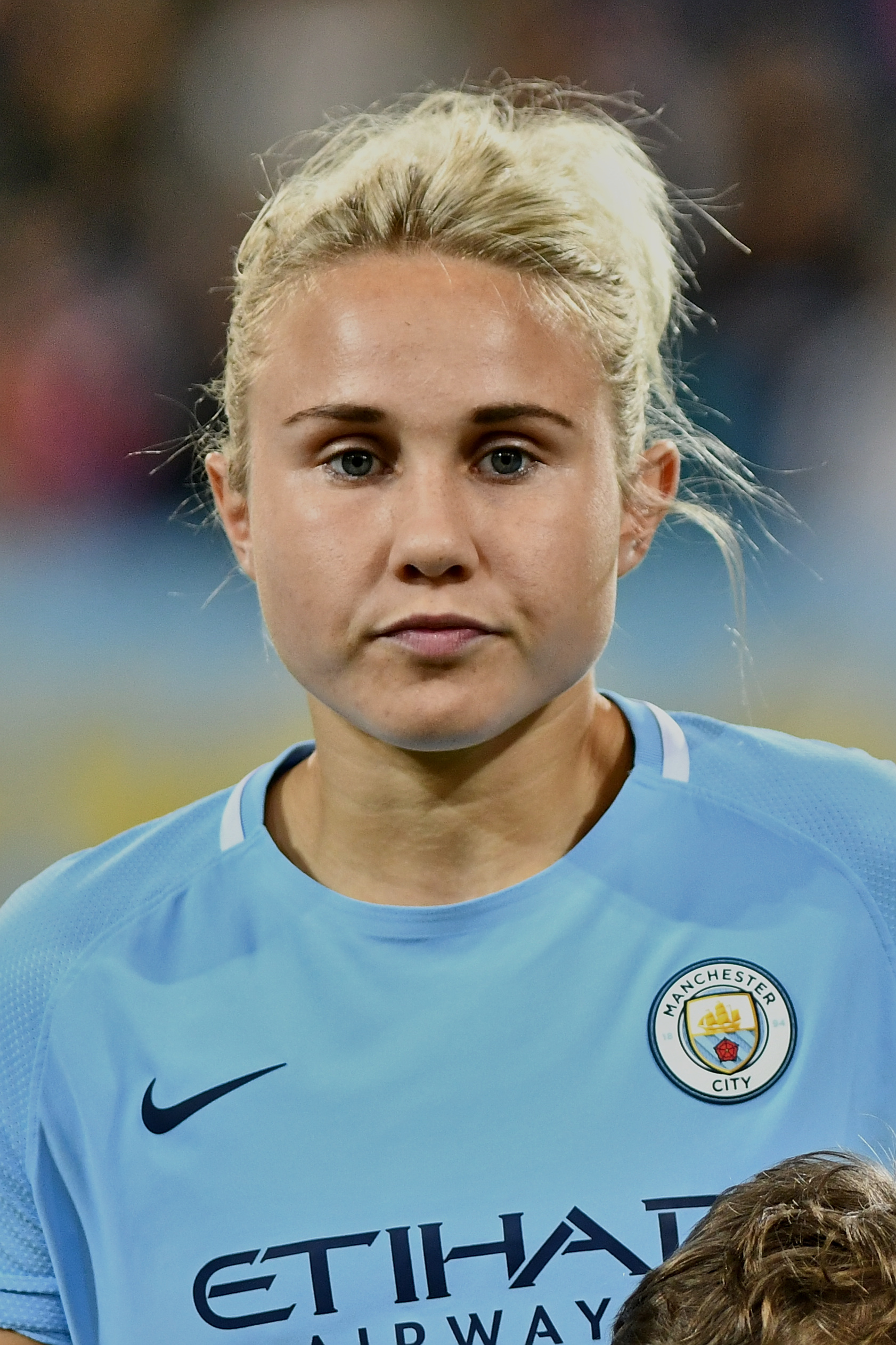
- Christiansen in 2017

Personal information
- Full name: Isobel Mary Christiansen
- Date of birth: 20 September 1991 (age 35)
- Place of birth: Macclesfield, England
- Positions: Midfielder; forward

Team information
- Current team: England WU23 (assistant coach)

Youth career
- 2001–2005: Manchester United
- 2005–2008: Everton

Senior career*
Years	Team	Apps	(Gls)
2008–2009	Everton		
2009–2014	Birmingham City	34	(3)
2014–2018	Manchester City	61	(18)
2018–2019	Lyon	20	(3)
2020–2023	Everton	19	(6)

International career
2010–2014	England U23	12	(1)
2015–2019	England	31	(6)

Managerial career
- 2025–: England WU23 (assistant)
Medal record
Women's football
Representing Great Britain
Summer Universiade
Gold medal – first place	2013 Kazan	Team
- * Club domestic league appearances and goals

Isobel Mary Christiansen (born 20 September 1991) is an English football manager, pundit, and former footballer who coaches the England women's national under-23 football team. She is known for her time with Manchester City between 2014 and 2018, and Everton (2019–2023), as a midfielder or forward. She also played for Birmingham City and Lyon, as a junior international in 2009 and later in the senior team, including in the 2019 World Cup qualifiers.

== Early life and education ==
Isobel Mary Christiansen was born in Macclesfield, Cheshire, on 20 September 1991. Her father, Niels, was born in Ledbury, Herefordshire, but lived with his Danish parents in the parish of Raklev, near Kalundborg on the island of Zealand, until the age of four.

Christiansen grew up in the village of Rainow, where she played football with friends and her brother Will. She has a younger sister, Rosie, who is a doctor. She attended Rainow Primary School, and joined the under-10s side at Manchester United, before moving to Everton when she was 14. During that time she attended Tytherington School in Macclesfield, and her mother would pick her up from school before the end of the day and drive her to training three days a week, picking up Danielle Turner (later Everton captain) in Warrington on the way.

Christiansen studied sports science at Birmingham University from 2011. She worked alongside studying, including a stint in the Maggoty Johnson bistro in Bollington. She initially aspired to be a teacher.

== Club career ==
Christiansen captained the women's football club at the University of Birmingham. She played mostly as a midfielder or forward. Christiansen has played in the UEFA Women's Champions League with Everton and also played for Birmingham City.

On 7 February 2014, Christiansen officially signed for new WSL club Manchester City Women. On 16 October 2014, she scored the only goal to help Manchester City defeat Arsenal Ladies and win the 2014 FA WSL Continental Cup.

On 23 July 2018, Christiansen signed a contract with defending European Champions Lyon until 2020. In her first season with the club, Lyon won the treble: winning Division 1 Féminine, Coupe de France and Champions League.

On 27 December 2019, Christiansen announced her return to England, signing an 18-month deal with Everton. She made her debut, in the following season, in a 4–0 league win against Bristol City on 6 September 2020. A week later, Christiansen scored her first goal since returning in a 1–0 win against Tottenham Hotspur.

On 25 May 2023 she announced she would retire at the end of the 2022/23 season.

== International career ==
As a junior international, she won the 2009 U-19 European Championship and a silver in the following year's edition, and played the 2008 U-17 and 2010 U-20 World Cups.

Christiansen helped Great Britain to win a gold medal in the 2013 Summer Universiade in Kazan, Russia. In January 2014, she was promoted from the under-23s into the senior England squad, to replace Jodie Taylor who had withdrawn.

Coach Mark Sampson gave Christiansen her senior international debut in a UEFA Women's Euro 2017 qualifying match against Estonia on 21 September 2015. She marked the occasion by scoring in England's 8–0 win.

In March 2019, Christiansen underwent surgery on an ankle injury sustained in England's 3–0 SheBelieves Cup win over Japan. England coach Phil Neville called her "vital" to his squad and hoped that her rehabilitation programme would restore her to fitness for the 2019 FIFA Women's World Cup.

Christiansen was allotted 189 when the FA announced their legacy numbers scheme to honour the 50th anniversary of England’s inaugural international.

== Managerial career ==
In August 2025, Christiansen was appointed as the head coach of Next Gen City Under-21s team at Manchester City Women. Two months later, she became an assistant coach of the England women's national under-23 football team. In February 2026, The FA announced that Christiansen would join newly appointed head coach Lauren Smith in managing the under-23s.

== Career statistics ==
=== International goals ===
England score listed first, score column indicates score after each Christiansen goal.

No.	Date	Venue	Opponent	Score	Result	Competition
1	21 September 2015	A. Le Coq Arena, Tallinn, Estonia	Estonia	5–0	8–0	Euro 2017 qualifying
2	23 October 2015	Yongchuan Sports Center, Chongqing, China	Australia	1–0	1–0	2015 Yongchuan International Tournament
3	4 June 2016	Adams Park, Wycombe, England	Serbia	5–0	7–0	Euro 2017 qualifying
4	10 April 2017	Stadium MK, Milton Keynes, England	Austria	3–0	3–0	Friendly
5	28 November 2017	Colchester Community Stadium, Colchester, England	Kazakhstan	5–0	5–0	2019 World Cup qualifying
6	4 September 2018	Tsentralniy, Pavlodar, Kazakhstan	Kazakhstan	3–0	6–0	2019 World Cup qualifying

== Other activities ==
In June 2020, Christiansen joined Common Goal, becoming the first Everton player to do so. By joining the charity, players pledge at least one percent of their salaries to a community fund that supports young people's football in around 90 countries.

While working as a coach, Christiansen has been making several appearances as a football pundit and commentator since 2019. She announced her decision to retire from football on the podcast "Three Players and a Podcast" in May 2023.

In June 2023, she ran part of an endurance run, between Leeds and Manchester, to assist a motor neurone disease charity.

She provided co-commentary for the 2023 FIFA Women's World Cup for the Seven Network in Australia and for the world feed produced by Host Broadcast Services (HBS).

== Honours ==
=== Team ===
Birmingham City

- FA Women's Cup: 2011–12

Manchester City

- FA WSL Continental Cup: 2014, 2016
- Women's Super League: 2016
- Women's FA Cup: 2016–17

Olympique Lyonnais

- Division 1 Féminine: 2018–19
- Coupe de France: 2019
- UEFA Women's Champions League: 2018–19
- Trophée des Championnes: 2019

England

- SheBelieves Cup: 2019

=== Individual ===
- 2015: Vitality Fitness Award
- 2015: Etihad Airways Player of the Season
- 2015: MCWFC Supporters Club Player of the Season Award
- 2015–2016:PFA Women's Players' Player of the Year
