= List of Manchester City W.F.C. seasons =

Manchester City is an English professional association football club based in Manchester, who currently play in the FA WSL. The list covers the period from 1988, when the club was founded, to the present day. It details the club's achievements in senior league and cup competitions, and the top scorers for each season where information is available.

== Background ==
Manchester City were formed in 1988, though they did not join an organised competition until the following year when they were admitted to the North West Women's Regional Football League. The club would make steady progress upwards until the season, when they would take the Premier League Northern Division title and were promoted to the WPL National, then the highest level of semi-pro football attainable in England, and only below the closed shop FA WSL. City were admitted to the WSL in 2014, coinciding with their decision to turn professional, and the move would ultimately be rewarded with their first senior silverware the same season.

== Seasons ==
Table correct as of 10 May 2025

Season	League									FA Cup	WSL Cup	Europe	Other		Top scorer	Goals
Season	Division (tier)	P	W	D	L	F	A	Pts	Pos	FA Cup	WSL Cup	Europe	Other		Top scorer	Goals
1989–90	NWWRFL D2 (2)	14	5	3	6	42	52	13	4th	R1			League Cup	R1		
1989–90	NWWRFL D2 (2)	14	5	3	6	42	52	13	4th	R1			Div2 Cup	QF		
1990–91	NWWRFL D2 (2)	18	11	2	5	65	37	24	4th	R4			League Cup	R3		
1990–91	NWWRFL D2 (2)	18	11	2	5	65	37	24	4th	R4			Div2 Cup	R2		
1991–92	NWWRFL D1 (3)^{[A]}	18	4	2	12	30	52	10	8th	R1			League Cup	QF		
1991–92	NWWRFL D1 (3)^{[A]}	18	4	2	12	30	52	10	8th	R1			Div1 Cup	R1		
1992–93	NWWRFL D1 (3)	12	4	1	7	26	49	9	5th	R1			League Cup	R3		
1992–93	NWWRFL D1 (3)	12	4	1	7	26	49	9	5th	R1			Div1 Cup	R2		
1993–94	NWWRFL D1 (3)	18	5	3	10	47	56	18	9th	R2			League Cup	R3		
1993–94	NWWRFL D1 (3)	18	5	3	10	47	56	18	9th	R2			Div1 Cup	R2		
1994–95	NWWRFL D1 (3)	18	6	3	9	20	51	21	7th	R1			League Cup	R3		
1994–95	NWWRFL D1 (3)	18	6	3	9	20	51	21	7th	R1			Div1 Cup	R2		
1995–96	NWWRFL D1 (3)	16	4	3	9	37	44	15	7th	R1			League Cup	R2		
1995–96	NWWRFL D1 (3)	16	4	3	9	37	44	15	7th	R1			Div1 Cup	R1		
1995–96	NWWRFL D1 (3)	16	4	3	9	37	44	15	7th	R1			County FA Cup	SF		
1996–97	NWWRFL D1 (3)	18	0	2	16	19	99	2	10th				League Cup	R1		
1996–97	NWWRFL D1 (3)	18	0	2	16	19	99	2	10th				Div1 Cup	QF		
1997–98	NWWRFL D2 (4)	20	18	2	0	102	26	56	1st				League Cup	R1	Justine Mason	29
1997–98	NWWRFL D2 (4)	20	18	2	0	102	26	56	1st				Div1 Cup	R1	Justine Mason	29
1998–99	NWWRFL Prem (4)^{[B]}	18	14	2	2	68	31	44	2nd	R3			League Cup	R3		
1999–2000	NWWRFL Prem (4)	18	15	2	1	71	20	47	1st	PR			League Cup	SF	Lindsay Savage	26
1999–2000	NWWRFL Prem (4)	18	15	2	1	71	20	47	1st	PR			Challenge Trophy	W	Lindsay Savage	26
1999–2000	NWWRFL Prem (4)	18	15	2	1	71	20	47	1st	PR			PremDiv Cup	W	Lindsay Savage	26
2000–01	Comb (3)	22	16	2	4	80	36	50	1st	R4						
2001–02	WPL No. (2)	20	4	4	12	19	45	16	10th	R3			WPL Cup	R1		
2002–03	WPL No. (2)	22	5	6	11	31	37	21	8th	R3			WPL Cup	R2		
2003–04	WPL No. (2)	20	7	3	10	35	45	24	7th	R3			WPL Cup	R1		
2004–05	WPL No. (2)	22	7	3	12	29	45	24	10th	R3			WPL Cup	R2		
2005–06	WPL No. (2)	22	3	7	12	19	31	16	11th				WPL Cup	R2		
2006–07	WPL No. (2)	22	6	6	10	27	35	24	10th				WPL Cup	PR		
2007–08	WPL No. (2)	22	7	4	11	29	41	25	7th				WPL Cup	R1		
2008–09	WPL No. (2)	22	13	4	5	42	22	43	3rd				WPL Cup	R1		
2009–10	WPL No. (2)	22	10	6	6	36	25	36	4th	R3			WPL Cup	R1		
2010–11	WPL No. (3)^{[C]}	18	12	1	5	37	18	37	4th	R2			WPL Cup	GS		
2011–12	WPL No. (3)	18	13	1	4	58	19	40	1st	R5			WPL Cup	R1		
2012–13	WPL Nt. (2)	18	7	4	7	32	25	25	4th^{[D]}	R5			WPL Cup	Ro16		
2014	WSL 1 (1)	14	6	1	7	13	16	19	5th	QF	W				Toni Duggan	11
2015	WSL 1 (1)	14	9	3	2	25	11	30	2nd	SF	QF				Toni Duggan	12
2016	WSL 1 (1)	16	13	3	0	36	4	42	1st	SF	W	SF			Jane Ross	13
2017	WSL SS (1)	8	6	1	1	17	6	19	2nd	W	not held	not held			Lucy Bronze / Jill Scott / Toni Duggan	4
2017–18	WSL 1 (1)	18	12	2	4	51	17	38	2nd	SF	RU	SF			Nikita Parris	18
2018–19	WSL 1 (1)	20	14	5	1	53	17	47	2nd	W	W	Ro32			Nikita Parris	24
2019–20	WSL 1 (1)	16	13	1	2	39	9	40	2nd	W	SF	Ro16			Pauline Bremer	22
2020–21	WSL 1 (1)	22	17	4	1	65	13	55	2nd	SF	QF	QF	Community Shield	RU	Chloe Kelly / Ellen White	15
2021–22	WSL 1 (1)	22	15	2	5	60	22	47	3rd	RU	W	QR2			Lauren Hemp	21
2022–23	WSL 1 (1)	22	15	2	5	50	25	47	4th	QF	SF	QR1			Khadija Shaw	31
2023–24	WSL 1 (1)	22	18	1	3	61	15	55	2nd	QF	SF				Khadija Shaw	22
2024–25	WSL 1 (1)	22	13	4	5	49	28	43	4th	SF	RU	QF			Khadija Shaw	19

Champions	Runners-up	Promoted	Relegated

== Key ==
- P = Played
- W = Games won
- D = Games drawn
- L = Games lost
- F = Goals for
- A = Goals against
- Pts = Points
- Pos = Final position

Leagues

- WSL = FA Women's Super League
- WSL SS = FA WSL Spring Series
- WPL Nt. = FA Women's Premier League National Division
- WPL No. = FA Women's Premier League Northern Division
- Comb = Northern Combination Women's Football League
- NWWRFL Prem = North West Women's Regional Football League Premier Division
- NWWRFL D1 = North West Women's Regional Football League Division One
- NWWRFL D2 = North West Women's Regional Football League Division Two

Cups

- WPL Cup = FA Women's Premier League Cup
- PremDiv Cup = North West Women's Regional Football League Premier Division Cup
- Div1 Cup = North West Women's Regional Football League Division One Cup
- Div2 Cup = North West Women's Regional Football League Division Two Cup
- QR = Qualifying round
- PR = Preliminary round
- R1 = Round 1
- R2 = Round 2
- R3 = Round 3
- R4 = Round 4
- R5 = Round 5
- Ro16 = Round of 16
- Ro32 = Round of 32
- QF = Quarter-finals
- SF = Semi-finals
- RU = Runners-up
- W = Winners

== Footnotes ==
- ^{A} Despite being promoted, Manchester City fell from the second tier of women's football to the third tier due to the creation of a new national league (the FA Women's Premier League) with two tiers
- ^{B} The North West Women's Regional Football League Division One was renamed the Premier Division. It moved from being the third tier of women's football to the fourth tier due to the creation of the Northern Combination, an intermediate regional league between the NWWRFL and the Women's Premier League
- ^{C} The Women's Premier League Northern Division moved from being the second tier of women's football to the third tier due to the creation of the FA Women's Super League
- ^{D} Promoted to the WSL via means of application upon league expansion

== External sources ==
- MCWFC official site - Results page
- RSSSF - Women's League Cup results
- FA results - Women's National League
