= 2012 UEFA Women's Under-19 Championship second qualifying round =

Football tournament qualification stage

The 2012 UEFA Women's U-19 Championship Second qualifying round will determine the participating teams at the 2012 UEFA Women's U-19 Championship held in Turkey.

== Qualified teams ==
Seeded nations Germany, France and England were joined by 21 teams from the first qualifying round. Northern Ireland qualified as the best third placed team.

Teams	Teams
Austria; Belgium; Czech Republic; Denmark; England; Finland; France; Germany; Iceland; Italy; Netherlands; Northern Ireland	Norway; Poland; Portugal; Republic of Ireland; Romania; Russia; Scotland; Serbia; Spain; Sweden; Switzerland; Wales

== Group stage ==
The draw was held on 15 November 2011 at Nyon, Switzerland. Teams will be drawn in six groups of four. The winners and best runners-up will qualify for the final tournament.

- All times CET

=== Group 1 ===
Team	Pld	W	D	L	GF	GA	GD	Pts
Portugal	3	2	0	1	7	5	+2	6
Norway	3	2	0	1	7	5	+2	6
Belgium	3	1	0	2	4	5	−1	3
Czech Republic	3	1	0	2	5	8	−3	3

March 31, 2012
16:00

Norway	3–0	Belgium
Reiten 4'; Hansen 16'; Søndenå 25'	Report

Complexo Desportivo da Tocha, Tocha
Referee: Morag Pirie (Scotland)

March 31, 2012
18:00

Czech Republic	3–2	Portugal
Bartoňová 6', 61'; Krejčiříková 28'	Report	Gomes 21'; Rodrigues 26'

Estádio Sergio Conceicao, Coimbra
Referee: Simona Ghisletta (Switzerland)

April 2, 2012
16:00

Belgium	3–0	Czech Republic
Van den Abbeele 45+1'; Schryvers 65'; Muni 70'	Report

Estádio Dr. Américo Couto, Mealhada
Referee: Simona Ghisletta (Switzerland)

April 2, 2012
18:00

Norway	1–3	Portugal
Håvik 85'	Report	Malho 14'; Gonçalves 24'; Silva 90+2'

Estádio Sergio Conceicao, Coimbra
Referee: Dilan Gökçek (Turkey)

April 5, 2012
15:00

Czech Republic	2–3	Norway
Krejčiříková 14'; Šturmová 89'	Report	Hansen 63'; Voltervik 79'; Thun 90+2'

Complexo Desportivo da Tocha, Tocha
Referee: Morag Pirie (Scotland)

April 5, 2012
15:00

Portugal	2–1	Belgium
Malho 21'; Rodrigues 89'	Report	van Loock 40'

Estádio José Bento Pessoa, Figueira da Foz
Referee: Dilan Gökçek (Turkey)

=== Group 2 ===
Team	Pld	W	D	L	GF	GA	GD	Pts
Sweden	3	3	0	0	7	1	+6	9
Germany	3	2	0	1	4	1	+3	6
Northern Ireland	3	1	0	2	3	5	−2	3
Poland	3	0	0	3	1	8	−7	0

March 31, 2012
16:00

Sweden	3–0	Northern Ireland
Rubensson 58'; Boström 80'; Rolfö 83'	Report

Behrn Arena, Örebro
Referee: Amy Rayner (England)

March 31, 2012
19:00

Germany	2–0	Poland
Leiding 58'; Cramer 67'	Report

Tunavallen, Eskilstuna
Referee: Dimitrina Milkova (Bulgaria)

April 2, 2012
16:00

Germany	2–0	Northern Ireland
Cramer 20'; Leupolz 65'	Report

Swedbank Park, Västerås
Referee: Leen Martens (Belgium)

April 2, 2012
18:00

Poland	1–3	Sweden
Knysak 26' (pen.)	Report	Rubensson 30', 57', 79'

Tunavallen, Eskilstuna
Referee: Dimitrina Milkova (Bulgaria)

April 5, 2012
15:00

Sweden	1–0	Germany
Hammarlund 36'	Report

Swedbank Park, Västerås
Referee: Amy Rayner (England)

April 5, 2012
15:00

Northern Ireland	3–0	Poland
McGuinness 22', 47'; Lennon 90+1'	Report

Behrn Arena, Örebro
Referee: Leen Martens (Belgium)

=== Group 3 ===
Team	Pld	W	D	L	GF	GA	GD	Pts
Romania	3	2	1	0	4	1	+3	7
France	3	2	0	1	2	1	+1	6
Netherlands	3	0	2	1	2	3	−1	2
Iceland	3	0	1	2	1	4	−3	1

March 31, 2012
15:00

France	0–1	Romania
	Report	Herczeg 81'

RKSV Nuenen, Nuenen
Referee: Gordana Kuzmanović (Serbia)

March 31, 2012
17:00

Iceland	1–1	Netherlands
Pedersen 35'	Report	Kuijpers 78'

Kozakken Boys, Werkendam
Referee: Linn Andersson (Sweden)

April 2, 2012
17:00

Romania	2–0	Iceland
Herczeg 3'; Vătafu 75'	Report

Kozakken Boys, Werkendam
Referee: Monika Mularczyk (Poland)

April 2, 2012
19:00

France	1–0	Netherlands
Asseyi 82'	Report

RKSV Nuenen, Nuenen
Referee: Linn Andersson (Sweden)

April 5, 2012
15:00

Iceland	0–1	France
	Report	Leroy 8'

Kozakken Boys, Werkendam
Referee: Gordana Kuzmanović (Serbia)

April 5, 2012
15:00

Netherlands	1–1	Romania
Becx 89'	Report	Lunca 44'

RKSV Nuenen, Nuenen
Referee: Monika Mularczyk (Poland)

=== Group 4 ===
Team	Pld	W	D	L	GF	GA	GD	Pts
Serbia	3	3	0	0	7	2	+5	9
Denmark	3	2	0	1	7	4	+3	6
Switzerland	3	1	0	2	2	4	−2	3
Republic of Ireland	3	0	0	3	0	6	−6	0

March 31, 2012
15:00

Denmark	3–0	Switzerland
Andersen 28' (pen.), 55'; Schneider 79'	Report

Suvača, Pećinci
Referee: Elia Martínez (Spain)

March 31, 2012
15:00

Republic of Ireland	0–2	Serbia
	Report	Čanković 75'; Damnjanović 90'

Stadion Srem Jakovo, Jakovo
Referee: Zuzana Kováčová (Slovakia)

April 2, 2012
15:00

Denmark	2–4	Serbia
Andersen 41', 56'	Report	Čubrilo 14'; Damjanović 22', 79'; Čanković 59'

Suvača, Pećinci
Referee: Sandra Braz Bastos (Portugal)

April 2, 2012
15:00

Switzerland	2–0	Republic of Ireland
Aigbogun 41'; Selimi 84'	Report

Stadion Srem Jakovo, Jakovo
Referee: Zuzana Kováčová (Slovakia)

April 5, 2012
15:00

Republic of Ireland	0–2	Denmark
	Report	Smidt Nielsen 56'; Andersen 60'

Suvača, Pećinci
Referee: Elia Martínez (Spain)

April 5, 2012
15:00

Serbia	1–0	Switzerland
Damjanović 50'	Report

Stadion Srem Jakovo, Jakovo
Referee: Sandra Braz Bastos (Portugal)

=== Group 5 ===
Team	Pld	W	D	L	GF	GA	GD	Pts
Spain	3	3	0	0	11	2	+9	9
Italy	3	2	0	1	6	6	0	6
Scotland	3	1	0	2	5	7	−2	3
Russia	3	0	0	3	0	6	−6	0

March 31, 2012
10:00

Spain	4–0	Italy
Pinel 35', 40'; Calderón 51'; Ortiz 90+2'	Report

Sputnik-Sport, Sochi
Referee: Riem Hussein (Germany)

March 31, 2012
14:30

Scotland	1–0	Russia
Richards 21'	Report

Sputnik-Sport, Sochi
Referee: Lina Lehtovaara (Finland)

April 3, 2012
10:00

Spain	4–0	Russia
Sampedro 24', 30'; Putellas 41'; Calderón 54' (pen.)	Report

Sputnik-Sport, Sochi
Referee: Betina Norman (Denmark)

April 3, 2012
14:30

Italy	4–2	Scotland
Alborghetti 18', 90'; Coppola 39', 43'	Report	McSorley 30'; Emslie 68'

Sputnik-Sport, Sochi
Referee: Lina Lehtovaara (Finland)

April 5, 2012
15:00

Scotland	2–3	Spain
Craig 64'; Clelland 90+3'	Report	García 28'; Putellas 51'; Lázaro 66'

Sputnik-Sport, Sochi
Referee: Riem Hussein (Germany)

April 5, 2012
15:00

Russia	0–1	Italy
	Report	Alborghetti 81' (pen.)

Sputnik-Sport, Sochi
Referee: Betina Norman (Denmark)

=== Group 6 ===
Team	Pld	W	D	L	GF	GA	GD	Pts
England	3	3	0	0	8	0	+8	9
Austria	3	1	0	2	2	3	−1	3
Finland	3	1	0	2	2	4	−2	3
Wales	3	1	0	2	3	8	−5	3

March 31, 2012
15:00

Austria	0–2	Wales
	Report	Price 29'; Ladd 33'

Rapid Solicitors Stadium, North Ferriby
Referee: Anastasia Pustovoitova (Russia)

March 31, 2012
20:00

England	1–0	Finland
Parris 63'	Report

Glanford Park, Scunthorpe
Referee: Knarik Grigoryan (Armenia)

April 2, 2012
15:00

Finland	0–2	Austria
	Report	Zadrazil 43'; Aschauer 55'

Blundell Park, Grimsby
Referee: Florence Guillemin (France)

April 2, 2012
20:00

England	6–0	Wales
England 41', 74'; Parris 44', 47', 69'; McCue 45+2'	Report

Sincil Bank, Lincoln
Referee: Knarik Grigoryan (Armenia)

April 5, 2012
15:00

Austria	0–1	England
	Report	Carter 19'

Blundell Park, Grimsby
Referee: Anastasia Pustovoitova (Russia)

April 5, 2012
15:00

Wales	1–2	Finland
Price 56'	Report	Heroum 62'; Huusko 90'

Glanford Park, Scunthorpe
Referee: Florence Guillemin (France)

== Ranking of second-placed teams ==
In the ranking of the second-place finishers, only the results against the first and third placed teams count.

Grp	Team	Pld	W	D	L	GF	GA	GD	Pts
4	Denmark	2	1	0	1	5	4	+1	3
1	Norway	2	1	0	1	4	3	+1	3
2	Germany	2	1	0	1	2	1	+1	3
6	Austria	2	1	0	1	2	1	+1	3
3	France	2	1	0	1	1	1	0	3
5	Italy	2	1	0	1	4	6	−2	3
