= 2018 FA WSL Cup final =

- Event: 2017–18 FA WSL Cup
Arsenal	Manchester City
1	0
- Date: 14 March 2018
- Venue: Adams Park, High Wycombe
- Referee: Amy Fearn (Derbyshire)
- Attendance: 2,136

The 2018 FA WSL Cup final was the seventh final of the FA WSL Cup, England's secondary cup competition for women's football teams and its primary league cup tournament. It took place on the 14 March 2018, at Adams Park, contested by Arsenal and Manchester City, the only two teams to have ever won the tournament.

Arsenal had competed in all but one of the previous finals, whereas Manchester City had only previously appeared in two but won both of them. The two teams previously played out the 2014 FA WSL Cup final, which Manchester City won by a goal to nil.

Arsenal won the match 1–0, with a first-half goal from Vivianne Miedema.

== Route to the final ==
Round	Opposition	Score
GS	London Bees (H)	7–0
GS	Millwall Lionesses (A)	5–2
GS	Reading (H)	1–2
GS	Watford (A)	6–0
QF	Sunderland (H)	3–1
SF	Reading (A)	3–2
Key: (H) = Home venue; (A) = Away venue; (N) = Neutral venue.

=== Arsenal ===
Arsenal's journey to the final began in the Group Stage, where they were drawn against Reading - who would go on to be a close rival in the league - as well as mostly lower-half FA WSL 2 teams London Bees, Millwall Lionesses and Watford. Games against the former and the latter would turn out to be easy and result in large winning margins, while a high-scoring away match against Millwall would result in a 5–2 victory. The goals scored in these matches would still not ultimately prove enough to secure Arsenal first place in their group, however, as the home tie against Reading finished with a disappointing 2–1 loss, and Arsenal qualified for the knock-outs in second behind their WSL 1 rival.

Progressing through to the quarter-finals Arsenal were drawn against Group One North winners Sunderland at home, who they would proceed to defeat by a two-goal margin in what would be new manager Joe Montemurro's first game.

They would then come up against Group Stage opponents Reading for a second time, this time being drawn away to the Berkshire team in the semi-finals. Once again they did not find their opponents easy, going down by a goal on two occasions before two late goals put them on top and through to the final.

Round	Opposition	Score
GS	Oxford United (A)	6–0
GS	Everton (H)	2–1
GS	Birmingham City (H)	2–0
GS	Doncaster Rovers Belles (A)	3–2
QF	Bristol City (A)	2–0
SF	Chelsea (A)	1–0
Key: (H) = Home venue; (A) = Away venue; (N) = Neutral venue.

=== Manchester City ===
In contrast to Arsenal, Manchester City were given a tougher Group Stage challenge with previous finalist Birmingham City, fellow WSL 1 team Everton and 2016 WSL 1 side Doncaster Rovers Belles joining City in a group which also featured WSL 2 mid-table side Oxford United. In their first game City defeated Oxford by six clear goals before fighting to a late home victory by the odd goal in three against Everton. A third victory was clocked up in their home match against Birmingham with two first half goals settling the tie to give City an early qualification for the next phase and the Group Stage was wrapped up in a 3–2 away win over Doncaster which saw three goals in four second half minutes.

Having qualified for the knock-out rounds with a perfect record, City were drawn against Group Two South runners-up Bristol City, whose men's team would meet City's own male contingent in the latter stages of their own league cup less than a month later, but defeated them by a slightly more comfortable two goals to nil.

In their semi-final, City were then drawn away again to Chelsea, pitting together the only two teams in English women's football with undefeated records by the half-way point of the season. In their first meeting of 2017–18 City were triumphant by a single early goal from debutant Nadia Nadim, putting them through to a third final in four seasons.

== Match ==
=== Details ===
14 March 2018
19:00 GMT (UTC+00:00)

Arsenal	1–0	Manchester City
Miedema 32'	Report

Adams Park, High Wycombe
Attendance: 2,136
Referee: Amy Fearn (Derbyshire)

Arsenal	Manchester City

GK	1	(Netherlands) Sari van Veenendaal
RB	18	(Scotland) Lisa Evans
CB	6	(England) Leah Williamson
CB	16	(Republic of Ireland) Louise Quinn
LB	3	(Scotland) Emma Mitchell	(yellow card) 29'
CM	20	(Netherlands) Dominique Janssen	(yellow card) 35'
CM	21	(Netherlands) Daniëlle van de Donk
AM	8	(England) Jordan Nobbs
RW	23	(England) Beth Mead		(substituted off) 81'
LW	10	(Scotland) Kim Little (c)		(substituted off) 89'
CF	11	(Netherlands) Vivianne Miedema		(substituted off) 73'
Substitutes:
GK	13	(England) Anna Moorhouse
DF	2	(England) Alex Scott
MF	22	(England) Lauren James
MF	26	(England) Ava Kuyken
FW	15	(Republic of Ireland) Katie McCabe		(substituted on) 89'
MF	17	(United States) Heather O'Reilly		(substituted on) 81'
FW	9	(England) Danielle Carter		(substituted on) 73'
Manager:
(Australia) Joe Montemurro

GK	26	(England) Ellie Roebuck
RB	23	(England) Abbie McManus
CB	6	(England) Steph Houghton (c)
CB	5	(Scotland) Jen Beattie
LB	3	(England) Demi Stokes
CM	8	(England) Jill Scott	(substituted off) 81'
CM	24	(England) Keira Walsh
CM	11	(England) Izzy Christiansen	(substituted off) 61'
RW	17	(England) Nikita Parris
CF	10	(Denmark) Nadia Nadim	(substituted off) 46'
LW	12	(England) Georgia Stanway
Substitutes:
GK	1	(England) Karen Bardsley
DF	2	(Denmark) Mie Jans
FW	7	(England) Melissa Lawley	(substituted on) 81'
DF	14	(England) Esme Morgan
FW	16	(Scotland) Jane Ross	(substituted on) 46'
FW	18	(England) Ella Toone
FW	22	(Scotland) Claire Emslie	(substituted on) 61'
Manager:
(England) Nick Cushing

Player of the match
Kim Little (Arsenal)

Assistant referees:
Sian Massey-Ellis (Birmingham)
Lisa Rashid (Birmingham)
Fourth official:
Sarah Garratt (Birmingham)

Match rules

- 90 minutes.
- 30 minutes of extra-time if necessary.
- Penalty shoot-out if scores still level.
- Seven named substitutes.
- Maximum of three substitutions.
