= 2019 FA Women's League Cup final =

- Event: 2018–19 FA Women's League Cup
Arsenal	Manchester City
0	0
- After extra time Manchester City won 4–2 on penalties
- Date: 23 February 2019
- Venue: Bramall Lane, Sheffield
- Player of the Match: Caroline Weir
- Referee: Lucy Oliver
- Attendance: 2,424

The 2019 FA Women's League Cup final was the eighth final of the FA Women's League Cup, England's secondary cup competition for women's football teams and its primary league cup tournament. It took place on 23 February 2019, at Bramall Lane, contested by Arsenal and Manchester City, the only two teams to have ever won the tournament.

Arsenal had competed in all but one of the previous finals, winning five. Manchester City had appeared in three of the last four, securing the trophy twice. The final was a rerun of the 2018 final, which was won by Arsenal by a goal to nil, while both teams also met in the final in 2014 when Manchester City won by the only goal.

== Route to the final ==
Round	Opposition	Score
GS	West Ham United (H)	3–1
GS	Lewes (A)	9–0
GS	Charlton Athletic (H)	5–0
GS	Millwall Lionesses (A)	3–1
QF	Birmingham City (H)	2–1
SF	Manchester United (H)	2–1
Key: (H) = Home venue; (A) = Away venue; (N) = Neutral venue.

=== Arsenal ===
Drawn again - as with the previous season - against mostly second-tier opposition, plus WSL mid-table side West Ham United, Arsenal improved on their second-place finish in the 2017–18 group stage with a dominating series of results to top their group having secured all twelve points, the high note being an away 9–0 win over Lewes in which both Kim Little and Vivianne Miedema scored hattricks.

The quarter-finals saw Arsenal paired with Birmingham City, a team only a few paces behind in the WSL title race with three previous WSL Cup final appearances to their names, including two against Arsenal. A tight match saw Birmingham take the lead, but an injury time goal from Miedema would ultimately settle the tie in Arsenal's favour.

The semi-final matched Arsenal against the resurrected Manchester United, who had been performing beyond their second division status all season. An all-Manchester final was prevented, however, as Arsenal took control of the match to seal their place with two more goals from Miedema.

Round	Opposition	Score
GS	Birmingham City (A)	(p) 0–0
GS	Leicester City Women (H)	4–0
GS	Bristol City (A)	3–0
GS	Sheffield United (H)	6–0
GS	Aston Villa (A)	4–0
QF	Brighton & Hove Albion (H)	7–1
SF	Chelsea (A)	2–0
Key: (H) = Home venue; (A) = Away venue; (N) = Neutral venue.

=== Manchester City ===
In the group stages, Manchester City again found themselves matched with title challengers Birmingham City, along with Bristol City and three Championship sides, playing one more game than Arsenal by virtue of the increased number of teams competing in the tournament compared with the previous season. Their campaign began slowly as they were only able to prevail against Birmingham City on penalties, meaning they would only take two points out of a possible three. With the toughest match already out of the way, they would go on to win all of their remaining games, scoring 17 goals and conceding none in the process.

Their quarter-final against Brighton & Hove Albion would prove to be their highest-scoring in the cup competition, with an initially slow match bursting into life in the closing stages as four goals were scored after the 85th minute. The match drew extra journalistic attention as it came barely 24 hours after Manchester City's men's team had themselves scored nine goals in their own League Cup tie.

Manchester City's place in the final would ultimately be assured by the work of Nikita Parris, who scored both goals as they defeated the reigning WSL champions Chelsea, giving them their fourth finals appearance in the previous five competitions.

== Match ==
=== Details ===
23 February 2019
12:15 GMT (UTC+00:00)

Arsenal	0–0 (a.e.t.)	Manchester City
	Report
Penalties
Little (penalty scored); Williamson (penalty missed); Van de Donk (penalty missed); Bloodworth (penalty scored)	2–4	(penalty scored) Stanway; (penalty missed) Hemp; (penalty scored) Emslie; (penalty scored) Houghton; (penalty scored) Beckie

Bramall Lane, Sheffield
Attendance: 2,424
Referee: Lucy Oliver

Arsenal	Manchester City

GK	1	(Netherlands) Sari van Veenendaal
DF	6	(England) Leah Williamson
DF	16	(Republic of Ireland) Louise Quinn
DF	4	(Denmark) Janni Arnth		(substituted off) 69'
MF	7	(Netherlands) Daniëlle van de Donk
MF	10	(Scotland) Kim Little (c)
MF	20	(Netherlands) Dominique Bloodworth	(yellow card) 58'
MF	2	(Denmark) Katrine Veje		(substituted off) 71'
FW	23	(England) Beth Mead
FW	15	(Republic of Ireland) Katie McCabe
FW	17	(Scotland) Lisa Evans
Substitutes:
GK	18	(France) Pauline Peyraud-Magnin
MF	24	(England) Ava Kuyken
FW	29	(England) Amelia Hazard		(substituted on) 71'
MF	33	(Portugal) Ana Caterina Albuquerque
FW	11	(Netherlands) Vivianne Miedema		(substituted on) 69'
Manager:
(Australia) Joe Montemurro

GK	1	(England) Karen Bardsley
DF	4	(England) Gemma Bonner
DF	6	(England) Steph Houghton (c)
DF	5	(Scotland) Jen Beattie
DF	3	(England) Demi Stokes
MF	25	(Belgium) Tessa Wullaert		(substituted off) 65'
MF	19	(Scotland) Caroline Weir		(substituted off) 118'
MF	8	(England) Jill Scott
MF	24	(England) Keira Walsh
FW	17	(England) Nikita Parris	(yellow card) 82'	(substituted off) 105'
FW	12	(England) Georgia Stanway	(yellow card) 40'
Substitutes:
GK	26	(England) Ellie Roebuck
FW	9	(Germany) Pauline Bremer
FW	11	(Canada) Janine Beckie		(substituted on) 65'
FW	15	(England) Lauren Hemp		(substituted on) 105'
DF	20	(Republic of Ireland) Megan Campbell
FW	22	(Scotland) Claire Emslie		(substituted on) 118'
DF	23	(England) Abbie McManus
Manager:
(England) Nick Cushing

Player of the match:
Caroline Weir (Manchester City)

Assistant referees:

Fourth official:

Match rules

- 90 minutes.
- 30 minutes of extra-time if necessary.
- Penalty shoot-out if scores still level.
- Seven named substitutes.
- Maximum of three substitutions.
