= 2018–19 Manchester City W.F.C. season =

Manchester City Women
2018–19 season
- Chairman: Khaldoon Mubarak
- Manager: Nick Cushing
- Stadium: Academy Stadium
- Women's Super League: 2nd
- FA Women's Cup: Winners
- WSL Cup: Winners
- Champions League: Round of 32
| Home colours | Away colours |

The 2018–19 season will be Manchester City Women's Football Club's 31st season of competitive football and its sixth season in the FA Women's Super League and at the top level of English women's football.

== Non-competitive ==
=== Pre-season ===
==== Friendly ====
| 24 July 2018 Friendly | Manchester City (England) | 1–0 | (France) Paris Saint-Germain | Portland, United States |
| 19:00 PDT | Nadim 49' | | | Stadium: Clive Charles Soccer Complex |

==== 2018 Women's International Champions Cup ====
Semi-finals
July 26 – Miami Gardens
(United States) North Carolina Courage | 2
(France) Paris Saint-Germain | 1
July 26 – Miami Gardens
(France) Olympique Lyonnais | 3
(England) Manchester City | 0

Final
July 29 – Miami Gardens
(United States) North Carolina Courage | 1
(France) Olympique Lyonnais | 0
Third place play-off
July 29 – Miami Gardens
(France) Paris Saint-Germain | 1
(England) Manchester City | 2

| 26 July 2018 Semi-final | Manchester City (England) | 0–3 | (France) Olympique Lyonnais | Miami, United States |
| 21:00 EDT | | | Le Sommer 4', 14'; Hegerberg 17' | Stadium: Hard Rock Stadium |

| 29 July 2018 Third Place Playoff | Manchester City (England) | 2–1 | (France) Paris Saint-Germain | Miami, United States |
| 18:15 EDT | Scott 41'; Jans 45' | | Pekel 2' | Stadium: Hard Rock Stadium |

==== Friendly ====
| 12 August 2018 Friendly | Manchester City (England) | 2–0 | (Spain) Barcelona | Manchester |
| 18:30 BST | Lawley 75'; Parris 89' (pen.) | | | Stadium: Academy Stadium |

== Competitions ==
=== Women's Super League ===
==== League table ====
| Pos | Team | Pld | W | D | L | GF | GA | GD | Pts | Qualification |
|---|---|---|---|---|---|---|---|---|---|---|
| 1 | Arsenal (C) | 20 | 18 | 0 | 2 | 70 | 13 | +57 | 54 | Qualification for the Champions League knockout phase |
| 2 | Manchester City | 20 | 14 | 5 | 1 | 53 | 17 | +36 | 47 | Qualification for the Champions League knockout phase |
| 3 | Chelsea | 20 | 12 | 6 | 2 | 46 | 14 | +32 | 42 | |
| 4 | Birmingham City | 20 | 13 | 1 | 6 | 29 | 17 | +12 | 40 | |
| 5 | Reading | 20 | 8 | 3 | 9 | 33 | 30 | +3 | 27 | |

Source: FA WSL
Rules for classification: 1) Points; 2) Goal difference; 3) Number of goals scored
(C) Champions

==== Results summary ====
| Overall | | | | | | | | Home | | | | | | Away | | | | | |
| Pld | W | D | L | GF | GA | GD | Pts | W | D | L | GF | GA | GD | W | D | L | GF | GA | GD |
|---|---|---|---|---|---|---|---|---|---|---|---|---|---|---|---|---|---|---|---|
| 20 | 14 | 5 | 1 | 53 | 17 | +36 | 47 | 7 | 3 | 0 | 25 | 9 | +16 | 7 | 2 | 1 | 28 | 8 | +20 |

Last updated: 11 May 2019.
Source: FA WSL

==== Results by matchday ====
| Matchday | 1 | 2 | 3 | 4 | 5 | 6 | 7 | 8 | 9 | 10 | 11 | 12 | 13 | 14 | 15 | 16 | 17 | 18 | 19 | 20 | 21 | 22 |
|---|---|---|---|---|---|---|---|---|---|---|---|---|---|---|---|---|---|---|---|---|---|---|
| Result | D | W | D | W | W | W | D | W | ✖ | W | W | W | D | W | W | D | W | W | W | ✖ | W | L |
| Position | 6 | 3 | 3 | 3 | 3 | 2 | 2 | 2 | 2 | 2 | 2 | 2 | 2 | 1 | 1 | 1 | 1 | 2 | 2 | 2 | 2 | 2 |

Updated to match(es) played on 11 May 2019. Source: FA WSL
W = Win; D = Draw; L = Loss

==== Matches ====
| 9 September 2018 1 | Chelsea | 0–0 | Manchester City | Kingston upon Thames |
| 14:00 BST (UTC+01:00) | Eriksson (yellow card) 53' | Report | Beattie (yellow card) 3'; Bonner (yellow card) 67' | Stadium: Kingsmeadow; Attendance: 2,501; Referee: Rebecca Welch |

| 20 September 2018 2 | Everton | 0–4 | Manchester City | Widnes |
| 19:00 BST (UTC+01:00) | | Report | Stanway 14'; Parris 64', 68'; Emslie 90+2' | Stadium: Halton Stadium; Attendance: 296; Referee: Lucy Oliver |

| 23 September 2018 3 | Manchester City | 2–2 | Bristol City | Manchester |
| 14:00 BST (UTC+01:00) | Stanway (yellow card) 78'; Parris 83' (pen.); Houghton 90' | Report | Kerkdijk 15'; Kemppi 50' | Stadium: Academy Stadium; Attendance: 1,338; Referee: Asaka Koizumi |

| 30 September 2018 4 | Birmingham City | 2–3 | Manchester City | Solihull |
| 14:00 BST (UTC+01:00) | McManus 8' (o.g.); Sargeant 49' | Report | Walsh (yellow card) 52'; Weir 54'; Parris 64'; Wullaert 72' | Stadium: Damson Park; Attendance: 824; Referee: Wayne Cartmel |

| 14 October 2018 5 | Manchester City | 7–1 | West Ham United | Manchester |
| 14:00 BST (UTC+01:00) | Weir 2'; Parris 7', 17'; Stanway 72', 80'; Houghton 76'; Wullaert 86' | Report | de Graaf 82' | Stadium: Academy Stadium; Attendance: 1,245; Referee: Rebecca Welch |

| 21 October 2018 6 | Brighton & Hove Albion | 0–6 | Manchester City | Crawley |
| 14:00 BST (UTC+01:00) | | Report | Stanway 21', 64', 68'; Weir 43'; Parris 87'; Emslie 90+1' | Stadium: Broadfield Stadium; Attendance: 815; Referee: Lucy Oliver |

| 26 October 2018 7 | Manchester City | 1–1 | Reading | Manchester |
| 19:00 BST (UTC+01:00) | Stanway 33'; Parris (yellow card) 90+1' | Report | Moore 50'; Pearce (yellow card) 68'; Allen (yellow card) 90+5' | Stadium: Academy Stadium; Attendance: 1,015; Referee: David McNamara |

| 4 November 2018 8 | Liverpool | 0–3 | Manchester City | Birkenhead |
| 14:00 GMT (UTC+00:00) | Murray (yellow card) 68' | Summary | Bonner (yellow card) 40'; Fahey 50' (o.g.); Parris 59' 85' (pen.) | Stadium: Prenton Park; Attendance: 661; Referee: Thomas Parsons |

| 25 November 2018 10 | Yeovil Town | 0–4 | Manchester City | Dorchester |
| 15:00 GMT (UTC+00:00) | | Summary | Parris 17'; Stanway (yellow card) 22'; Weir 40'; Houghton 83'; Emslie 88' | Stadium: The Avenue Stadium; Attendance: 1,153; Referee: Lewis Sandoe |

| 2 December 2018 11 | Manchester City | 2–0 | Arsenal | Manchester |
| 12:30 GMT (UTC+00:00) | Stanway 18' 64' | Summary | Mead (yellow card) 30' van de Donk (yellow card) 52'; Williamson (yellow card) 56'; McCabe (yellow card) 74'; Wälti (yellow card) 89' | Stadium: Academy Stadium; Attendance: 2,149; Referee: Abby Marriott |

| 9 December 2018 12 | Manchester City | 1–0 | Birmingham City | Manchester |
| 12:15 GMT (UTC+00:00) | Stanway 12' (yellow card) 90+2'; Walsh (yellow card) 17' | Summary | | Stadium: Academy Stadium; Attendance: 1,157; Referee: Rebecca Welch |

| 6 January 2019 13 | Bristol City | 1–1 | Manchester City | Filton |
| 15:00 GMT (UTC+00:00) | Graham 62' (pen.) | | Parris 36'; Stanway (yellow card) 76' | Stadium: Stoke Gifford Stadium; Attendance: 812; Referee: James Durkin |

| 13 January 2019 14 | West Ham United | 1–3 | Manchester City | London |
| 15:00 GMT (UTC+00:00) | Ross 58' | | Weir 15'; Hemp 39'; Parris 86'; Beckie (yellow card) 90+2' | Stadium: London Community Track; Attendance: 640; Referee: Jason Richardson |

| 27 January 2019 15 | Manchester City | 3–0 | Brighton & Hove Albion | Manchester |
| 14:00 GMT (UTC+00:00) | Parris 3' (pen.), 40'; Bonner 31' | Report | | Stadium: Academy Stadium; Attendance: 1,279; Referee: Amy Fearns |

| 10 February 2019 16 | Manchester City | 2–2 | Chelsea | Manchester |
| 13:00 GMT (UTC+00:00) | Wullaert 12'; Stanway 24'; Walsh (yellow card) 90' | Report | Bright (yellow card) 6'; Spence (yellow card) 18'; Ji So-yun 50' 89' | Stadium: Academy Stadium; Attendance: 3078; Referee: Matthew Dicicco |

| 21 February 2019 17 | Manchester City | 3–1 | Everton | Manchester |
| 19:00 GMT (UTC+00:00) | Walsh 47'; Beckie 55'; Parris 90' | Report | Boye-Hlorkah 12' | Stadium: Academy Stadium; Attendance: 864; Referee: Elizabeth Simms |

| 13 March 2019 18 | Reading | 3–4 | Manchester City | High Wycombe |
| 19:30 GMT (UTC+00:00) | Chaplen 3'; Williams 61' (pen.); Pearce 86' | | Parris 15' 36' 39' (yellow card) 90+2'; Stokes 54'; McManus (yellow card) 68' | Stadium: Adams Park; Attendance: 449; Referee: Tom Reeves |

| 31 March 2019 19 | Manchester City | 2–1 | Liverpool | Manchester |
| 14:00 GMT (UTC+00:00) | Emslie 27'; Beattie 90+3' | Report | Sweetman-Kirk 52' | Stadium: Academy Stadium; Attendance: 1,568; Referee: Lucy Oliver |

| 28 April 2019 21 | Manchester City | 2–1 | Yeovil Town | Manchester |
| 14:00 BST (UTC+01:00) | Parris 30'; Hemp 65' | Report | Fergusson 1' | Stadium: Academy Stadium; Attendance: 1,369; Referee: Richard Aspinall |

| 12 May 2019 22 | Arsenal | 1–0 | Manchester City | Borehamwood |
| 14:00 BST (UTC+01:00) | Emma Mitchell 89' | Report | | Stadium: Meadow Park |

=== FA Cup ===
| 2 February 2019 Fourth round proper | Manchester City | 3–0 | Watford | Manchester |
| 15:00 BST (UTC+01:00) | Parris 62' 69'; Bremer 86' | Report | | Stadium: Academy Stadium; Attendance: 883; Referee: Ben Atkinson |

| 17 February 2019 Fifth round proper | Tottenham Hotspur | 0–3 | Manchester City | Cheshunt |
| 14:00 BST (UTC+01:00) | | Report | Houghton 37'; Hemp 39'; Bonner 51' | Stadium: Cheshunt Stadium; Attendance: 1,153; Referee: Matthew Russell |

| 17 March 2019 Sixth round proper | Manchester City | 3–0 | Liverpool | Manchester |
| 14:00 BST (UTC+01:00) | Beckie 25'; Stanway 69'; Stanway 88' | | | Stadium: Academy Stadium |

| 14 April 2019 Semi-finals | Manchester City | 1–0 | Chelsea | Manchester |
| 15:30 BST (UTC+01:00) | Eriksson 90+2' (o.g.) | | | Stadium: Academy Stadium |

| 4 May 2019 Final | Manchester City | 3–0 | West Ham United | London |
| 17:30 BST (UTC+01:00) | Walsh 52'; Stanway 81'; Hemp 88' | Report | | Stadium: Wembley Stadium; Attendance: 43,264; Referee: Abigail Byrne (Suffolk) |

=== WSL Cup ===
==== Group stage ====
| Pos | Team | Pld | W | WPEN | LPEN | L | GF | GA | GD | Pts | Qualification | MCI | BIR | BRI | SHU | AST | LEI |
|---|---|---|---|---|---|---|---|---|---|---|---|---|---|---|---|---|---|
| 1 | Manchester City | 5 | 4 | 1 | 0 | 0 | 17 | 0 | +17 | 14 | Advance to knock-out stage | — | — | — | 6–0 | — | 4–0 |
| 2 | Birmingham City | 5 | 3 | 0 | 2 | 0 | 10 | 0 | +10 | 11 | Advance to knock-out stage | 0–0 | — | 0–0 | — | 2–0 | — |
| 3 | Bristol City | 5 | 2 | 1 | 1 | 1 | 10 | 8 | +2 | 9 | | 0–3 | — | — | 3–1 | 5–2 | — |
| 4 | Sheffield United | 5 | 2 | 0 | 0 | 3 | 6 | 13 | −7 | 6 | | — | 0–2 | — | — | — | 3–1 |
| 5 | Aston Villa | 5 | 1 | 0 | 0 | 4 | 4 | 13 | −9 | 3 | | 0–4 | — | — | 1–2 | — | — |
| 6 | Leicester City | 5 | 0 | 1 | 0 | 4 | 3 | 16 | −13 | 2 | | — | 0–6 | 2–2 | — | 0–1 | — |

Source: thefa.com
Rules for classification: 1) Points; 2) Goal difference; 3) Number of goals scored

| 19 August 2018 Group One North | Birmingham City | 0–0 (4–5 p) | Manchester City | Solihull |
| 14:00 BST (UTC+01:00) | Harrop (yellow card) 14'; Arthur (yellow card) 17' | Report | Bonner (yellow card) 66' | Stadium: Damson Park; Attendance: 572; Referee: Jack Shepherd |
| | Penalties |
| | Mannion (penalty scored); Staniforth (penalty missed); Harrop (penalty scored); Quinn (penalty scored); White (penalty scored); Mayling (penalty missed); Ladd (penalty missed) | | (penalty scored) Parris; (penalty scored) Weir; (penalty scored) Emslie; (penalty scored) Houghton; (penalty missed) McManus; (penalty missed) Walsh; (penalty scored) Beattie |

| 26 August 2018 Group One North | Manchester City | 4–0 | Leicester City | Manchester |
| 15:00 BST (UTC+01:00) | Wullaert 53', 79'; Lawley (yellow card) 66'; McCue 71' (o.g.); Nadim 82' | Report | | Stadium: Academy Stadium; Attendance: 1,609; Referee: James Bell |

| 16 September 2018 Group One North | Bristol City | 0–3 | Manchester City | Filton |
| 14:00 BST (UTC+01:00) | | Report | Emslie 52'; Nadim 65' (pen.); Weir 72' | Stadium: Stoke Gifford Stadium; Attendance: 451; Referee: Savvas Yianni |

| 5 December 2018 Group One North | Manchester City | 6–0 | Sheffield United | Manchester |
| 19:00 GMT (UTC+00:00) | Beckie 8' 25' 49' 79'; Park 14'; Stanway 53' (pen.) | Summary | | Stadium: Academy Stadium; Referee: Helen Conley |

| 13 December 2018 Group One North | Aston Villa | 0–4 | Manchester City | Sutton Coldfield |
| 19:30 GMT (UTC+00:00) | Hutton (yellow card) 54'; N'Dow (yellow card) 57' | Summary | Bonner 21'; Beckie 25'; Park 77'; Hemp 84' | Stadium: Trevor Brown Memorial Ground; Attendance: 458; Referee: Robert Massey Ellis |

==== Knockout rounds ====
| 9 January 2019 Quarter-final | Manchester City | 7–1 | Brighton & Hove Albion | Manchester |
| 19:30 GMT (UTC+00:00) | Parris 6'; Hemp 23', 86'; Weir 59'; Emslie 88'; Stanway 90'; Beckie 90+2' | Report | Buet 9' (pen.) | Stadium: Academy Stadium; Attendance: 786; Referee: Benjamin Speedie |

| 6 February 2019 Semi-final | Chelsea | 0–2 | Manchester City | Kingston upon Thames |
| 19:30 GMT (UTC+00:00) | | Report | Parris 49'; Parris 81' | Stadium: Kingsmeadow; Attendance: 1348; Referee: David Rock |

| 23 February 2019 Final | Arsenal | 0–0 (a.e.t.) (2–4 p) | Manchester City | Sheffield |
| 12:15 GMT (UTC+00:00) | Bloodworth (yellow card) 58' | Report | Stanway (yellow card) 40'; Parris (yellow card) 82'; Bardsley (yellow card) 125' | Stadium: Bramhall Lane; Attendance: 2,424; Referee: Lucy Oliver |
| | Penalties |
| | Little (penalty scored); Williamson (penalty missed) van de Donk (penalty missed); Bloodworth (penalty scored) | | (penalty scored) Stanway; (penalty missed) Hemp; (penalty scored) Emslie; (penalty scored) Houghton; (penalty scored) Beckie |

=== Champions League ===
==== Round of 32 ====
| 13 September 2018 First leg | Atlético Madrid (Spain) | 1–1 | (England) Manchester City | Majadahonda, Spain |
| 19:30 CEST | Robles 89' | Report | Bonner 16'; McManus (yellow card) 45+1'; Bardsley (yellow card) 57' | Stadium: Estadio Cerro del Espino; Referee: Sara Persson (Sweden) |

| 26 September 2018 Second leg | Manchester City (England) | 0–2 | (Spain) Atlético Madrid | Manchester |
| 19:00 BST | Stanway (yellow card) 55'; Beattie (yellow card) 69' | Report | Meseguer 4'; da Silva 45+1'; Aleixandri (yellow card) 71' | Stadium: Academy Stadium; Referee: Lina Lehtovaara (Finland) |

== Squad information ==
=== Playing statistics ===
As of 11 May 2019

Appearances (Apps.) numbers are for appearances in competitive games only including sub appearances
Red card numbers denote: Numbers in parentheses represent red cards overturned for wrongful dismissal.

| No. | Nat. | Player | Pos. | WSL | | | FA Cup | | | WSL Cup | | | Champions League | | | Total | | |
| No. | Nat. | Player | Pos. | Apps | Goal | Sent off (straight red) | Apps | Goal | Sent off (straight red) | Apps | Goal | Sent off (straight red) | Apps | Goal | Sent off (straight red) | Apps | Goal | Sent off (straight red) |
|---|---|---|---|---|---|---|---|---|---|---|---|---|---|---|---|---|---|---|
| 1 | (England) | Karen Bardsley | GK | 5 | | | 4 | | | 6 | | | 1 | | | 16 | | |
| 2 | (Denmark) | Mie Jans | DF | | | | | | | 2 | | | 1 | | | 3 | | |
| 3 | (England) | Demi Stokes | DF | 11 | 1 | | 4 | | | 2 | | | | | | 17 | 1 | |
| 4 | (England) | Gemma Bonner | DF | 17 | 1 | | 4 | 1 | | 8 | 1 | | 1 | 1 | | 30 | 4 | |
| 5 | (Scotland) | Jen Beattie | DF | 17 | 1 | | 4 | | | 5 | | | 1 | | | 27 | 1 | |
| 6 | (England) | Steph Houghton | DF | 20 | 3 | | 5 | 1 | | 6 | | | | | | 31 | 4 | |
| 7 | (England) | Melissa Lawley | FW | 4 | | | 1 | | | 4 | | | 1 | | | 10 | | |
| 8 | (England) | Jill Scott | MF | 19 | | | 4 | | | 4 | | | 1 | | | 28 | | |
| 9 | (Germany) | Pauline Bremer | FW | 4 | | | 2 | 1 | | 3 | | | | | | 9 | 1 | |
| 10 | (Denmark) | Nadia Nadim | FW | 3 | | | | | | 3 | 1 | | 1 | | | 7 | 1 | |
| 11 | (Canada) | Janine Beckie | FW | 9 | 1 | | 2 | 1 | | 5 | 7 | | | | | 16 | 9 | |
| 12 | (England) | Georgia Stanway | FW | 19 | 11 | | 5 | 3 | | 6 | 2 | | 1 | | | 31 | 16 | |
| 13 | (England) | Fran Stenson | GK | | | | | | | 1 | | | | | | 1 | | |
| 14 | (England) | Esme Morgan | DF | 6 | | | 1 | | | 3 | | | | | | 10 | | |
| 15 | (England) | Lauren Hemp | FW | 10 | 2 | | 4 | 2 | | 5 | 3 | | | | | 19 | 7 | |
| 17 | (England) | Nikita Parris | FW | 19 | 19 | | 5 | 2 | | 4 | 3 | | 1 | | | 29 | 24 | |
| 19 | (Scotland) | Caroline Weir | FW | 18 | 5 | | 4 | | | 6 | 2 | | 1 | | | 29 | 7 | |
| 20 | (Republic of Ireland) | Megan Campbell | DF | 4 | | | 2 | | | | | | | | | 6 | | |
| 22 | (Scotland) | Claire Emslie | FW | 14 | 4 | | 4 | | | 7 | 2 | | 1 | | | 26 | 6 | |
| 23 | (England) | Abbie McManus | DF | 13 | | | 2 | | | 5 | | | 1 | | | 21 | | |
| 24 | (England) | Keira Walsh | MF | 19 | 1 | | 4 | 1 | | 8 | | | 1 | | | 32 | 2 | |
| 25 | (Belgium) | Tessa Wullaert | FW | 18 | 3 | | 4 | | | 7 | 2 | | 1 | | | 30 | 5 | |
| 26 | (England) | Ellie Roebuck | GK | 15 | | | 1 | | | 1 | | | | | | 17 | | |
| 33 | (England) | Jess Park | MF | 2 | | | 1 | | | 3 | 2 | | | | | 6 | 2 | |
| | (England) | Emma Bissell | | | | | | | | 1 | | | | | | 1 | | |
| Own goals | | | | | 1 | | | 1 | | | 1 | | | 0 | | | 3 | |
| Totals | | | | | 53 | 0 | | 13 | 0 | | 26 | 0 | | 1 | 0 | | 91 | 0 |

== Transfers and loans ==
=== Transfers in ===
| Date | Position | No. | Player | From club |
|---|---|---|---|---|
| 1 July 2018 | FW | 15 | (England) Lauren Hemp | (England) Bristol City |
| 1 July 2018 | FW | 19 | (Scotland) Caroline Weir | (England) Liverpool |
| 1 July 2018 | DF | 4 | (England) Gemma Bonner | (England) Liverpool |
| 1 July 2018 | FW | 25 | (Belgium) Tessa Wullaert | (Germany) VfL Wolfsburg |
| 9 August 2018 | FW | 11 | (Canada) Janine Beckie | (United States) Sky Blue FC |

=== Transfers out ===
| Date | Position | No. | Player | To club |
|---|---|---|---|---|
| 30 June 2018 | FW | 16 | (Scotland) Jane Ross | (England) West Ham United |
| 30 June 2018 | MF | 4 | (Netherlands) Tessel Middag | (England) West Ham United |
| 13 July 2018 | FW | 18 | (England) Ella Toone | (England) Manchester United |
| 23 July 2018 | MF | | (Sweden) Julia Spetsmark | (Sweden) Djurgården |
| 23 July 2018 | MF | 11 | (England) Izzy Christiansen | (France) Olympique Lyon |
| 19 December 2018 | FW | 10 | (Denmark) Nadia Nadim | (France) Paris Saint-Germain |
| 7 January 2019 | DF | 2 | (Denmark) Mie Jans | (Sweden) FC Rosengård |
