= Melissa Lawley =

English footballer (born 1994)

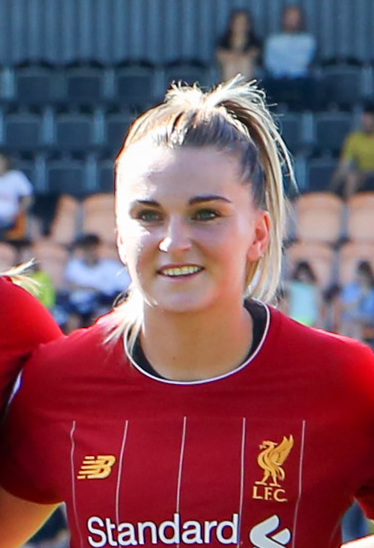
- Lawley with Liverpool in 2019

Personal information
- Full name: Melissa Elizabeth Lawley
- Date of birth: 28 April 1994 (age 32)
- Place of birth: Kidderminster, England
- Height: 1.68 m (5 ft 6 in)
- Position: Midfielder

Team information
- Current team: Wolverhampton Wanderers

Youth career
- Aston Villa
- Arsenal

Senior career*
Years	Team	Apps	(Gls)
2011	Arsenal	0	(0)
2012	Bristol Academy	12	(1)
2013–2016	Birmingham City	54	(6)
2016–2019	Manchester City	22	(1)
2019–2024	Liverpool	50	(7)
2024–2026	Everton	22	(0)
2025–2026	→ Burnley (loan)	8	(4)
2026–	Wolverhampton Wanderers	0	(0)

International career^{‡}
2010–2011	England U17	5	(1)
2011–2013	England U19	15	(4)
2014	England U20	3	(0)
2014–2017	England U23	14	(3)
2017–2019	England	12	(1)
- * Club domestic league appearances and goals as of 14:54, 19 May 2026 (UTC) ‡ National team caps and goals as of 20 December 2023

Melissa Elizabeth Lawley (born 28 April 1994) is an English professional footballer who plays as a midfielder for Women's Super League 2 club Wolverhampton Wanderers.

She has previously played for Bristol Academy, Birmingham City, Manchester City, Liverpool, and Everton. Lawley has represented England at the under-17, under-19, under-20, under-23 and senior levels.

== Club career ==
Lawley made her senior debut for Arsenal in their 6–0 Champions League win against FK Bobruichanka on 5 October 2011. Lawley signed for Birmingham City in 2013 from Bristol Academy. In January 2016, Lawley signed a new contract with Birmingham. In December 2016, she signed for Manchester City.

On 15 June 2019, Liverpool announced they had signed Lawley ahead of the 2019–20 season.

In the 2023–24 home game against Tottenham Hotspur, Lawley provided the assist for Marie Höbinger, equalizing 1–1 in the 91st minute.

After departing Liverpool at the end of her contract, Lawley signed for Everton on 25 July 2024.

On 24 July 2025, Burnley F.C. announced that Lawley would be joining them on loan from Everton for the 2025-26 season, which saw Lawley join back up with former Liverpool manager Matt Beard. On 10 January 2026, she returned to Everton after being recalled from her loan spell. On 26 June 2026, it was announced that she would leave Everton when her contract expired.

On 26 June 2026, Lawley was announced at Wolves.

== International career ==
Lawley was allotted 199 when the FA announced their legacy numbers scheme to honour the 50th anniversary of England’s inaugural international.

== Career statistics ==
=== Club ===
As of match played 16 May 2026

Appearances and goals by club, season and competition
Club	Season	League			FA Cup		League cup		Continental (Note: Includes UEFA Women's Champions League)		Total	
Club	Season	Division	Apps	Goals	Apps	Goals	Apps	Goals	Apps	Goals	Apps	Goals
Arsenal	2011	Women's Super League	0	0	0	0	0	0	1	0	1	0
Bristol Academy	2012	Women's Super League	12	1	?	?	4	0	—		16	1
Birmingham City	2013	Women's Super League	13	4	?	?	3	0	—		16	4
Birmingham City	2014	Women's Super League	12	0	?	?	4	0	7	2	23	2
Birmingham City	2015	Women's Super League	14	1	?	?	6	1	—		20	2
Birmingham City	2016	Women's Super League	15	1	?	?	4	1	—		19	2
Birmingham City	Total		66	7	?	?	21	2	7	2	94	11
Manchester City	2017	Women's Super League	5	1	4	1	—		3	0	12	2
Manchester City	2017–18	Women's Super League	13	0	3	0	5	0	7	1	28	1
Manchester City	2018–19	Women's Super League	4	0	1	0	4	0	2	0	11	0
Manchester City	Total		22	1	8	1	9	0	12	1	51	3
Liverpool	2019–20	Women's Super League	14	1	2	0	3	1	—		19	2
Liverpool	2020–21	Championship	19	3	1	0	3	0	—		23	3
Liverpool	2021–22	Championship	21	2	1	0	3	0	—		25	2
Liverpool	2022–23	Women's Super League	13	0	1	0	4	0	—		18	0
Liverpool	2023–24	Women's Super League	17	1	3	1	3	0	—		23	2
Liverpool	Total		84	7	8	1	16	1	0	0	108	9
Everton	2024–25	Women's Super League	17	0	2	0	2	0	—		21	0
Everton	2025–26	Women's Super League	5	0	2	0	0	0	—		7	0
Everton	Total		22	0	4	0	2	0	0	0	28	0
Burnley (loan)	2025–26	FA Women's National League	8	4	1	0	—		—		9	4
Career total			214	20	21	2	52	3	20	3	307	28

=== International ===
As of match played 8 October 2019

Appearances and goals by national team and year
National team	Year	Apps	Goals
England	2017	3	1
England	2018	8	0
England	2019	1	0
Total		12	1

Scores and results list England's goal tally first, score column indicates score after each Lawley goal.

List of international goals scored by Melissa Lawley
No.	Date	Venue	Opponent	Score	Result	Competition	Ref.
1	28 November 2017	Colchester Community Stadium, Colchester, England	Kazakhstan	1–0	5–0	2019 FIFA World Cup qualification	

== Honours ==
Manchester City

- FA Women's Cup: 2016–17

Liverpool FC

- FA Women's Championship: 2021-22
