= 2017 Manchester City W.F.C. season =

Manchester City Women
2017 season
- Chairman: Khaldoon Mubarak
- Manager: Nick Cushing
- Stadium: Academy Stadium
- Women's Super League: 2nd
- FA Women's Cup: Winners
- Champions League: Semi-final
Home colours	Away colours

The 2017 season is Manchester City Women's Football Club's 29th season of competitive football and its fourth season in the FA Women's Super League and at the top level of English women's football, having been promoted from the FA Women's Premier League before the 2014 season.

Following a reorganisation of top-level women's football in England, the 2017 season will only cover half of a traditional season's length, with the league season only running to nine games total, while the FA WSL shifts its calendar to match the traditional autumn-to-spring axis of football in Europe. For the same reason, there is no Champions League qualification nor relegation to be competed for.

== Non-competitive ==
=== Pre-season ===
==== Friendly ====
5 February 2017 Friendly	1. FFC Turbine Potsdam (Germany)	4–1	(England) Manchester City	Velten, Germany
13:00 GMT	Rauch 36', 65', 70', 80'	Report	Toni Duggan 85'	Stadium: SC Oberhavel Velten stadium

10 February 2017 Friendly	Manchester City (England)	1–2	(Germany) 1. FFC Frankfurt	Manchester
19:00 GMT	Parris 75'	Report	Groenen 10'; Islacker 31'	Stadium: Academy Stadium; Attendance: 700

== Competitions ==
=== Women's Super League ===
==== League table ====
Pos	Team	Pld	W	D	L	GF	GA	GD	Pts
1	Chelsea (C)	8	6	1	1	32	3	+29	19
2	Manchester City	8	6	1	1	17	6	+11	19
3	Arsenal	8	5	3	0	22	9	+13	18
4	Liverpool	8	4	2	2	20	18	+2	14
5	Sunderland	8	2	3	3	4	14	−10	9

Source: FA WSL
Rules for classification: 1) Points; 2) Goal difference; 3) Number of goals scored
(C) Champions

==== Results summary ====
Overall								Home						Away					
Pld	W	D	L	GF	GA	GD	Pts	W	D	L	GF	GA	GD	W	D	L	GF	GA	GD
8	6	1	1	17	6	+11	19	2	1	1	7	3	+4	4	0	0	10	3	+7

Last updated: 3 June 2017.
Source: FA WSL

==== Results by matchday ====
Matchday	1	2	3	4	5	6	7	8
Ground	H	A	A	H	H	H	A	A
Result	D	W	W	W	W	L	W	W
Position	8	5	2	3	2	2	2	2

Updated to match(es) played on 3 June 2017. Source: FA WSL
A = Away; H = Home; W = Win; D = Draw; L = Loss

==== Matches ====
3 May 2017 1	Manchester City	1–1	Birmingham City	Manchester
19:00 BST (UTC+01:00)	Bronze 58'	Report	Westwood 14'	Stadium: Academy Stadium; Referee: Joseph Johnson

7 May 2017 2	Reading	2–3	Manchester City	High Wycombe
14:00 BST (UTC+01:00)	Moore 59'; Bruton 73'	Report	Parris 6', 76'; Scott 77'	Stadium: Adams Park; Attendance: 579

9 May 2017 3	Bristol City	0–3	Manchester City	Filton
19:00 BST (UTC+01:00)		Report	Duggan 43', 51', 57'	Stadium: Stoke Gifford Stadium; Attendance: 875; Referee: Savvas Yianni

21 May 2017 4	Manchester City	5–1	Yeovil Town	Manchester
14:00 BST (UTC+01:00)	Heatherson 9' (o.g.); Scott 10'; Ross 38', 61'; Asllani 68'	Report	Quinn 20'	Stadium: Academy Stadium; Attendance: 1,152; Referee: Paul Graham

25 May 2017 5	Manchester City	1–0	Chelsea	Manchester
19:00 BST (UTC+01:00)	Duggan 27'	Report		Stadium: Academy Stadium; Attendance: 1,069; Referee: Simeon Lucas

28 May 2017 6	Manchester City	0–1	Arsenal	Manchester
				Stadium: Academy Stadium; Attendance: 1,808; Referee: Anthony Tankard

31 May 2017 7	Sunderland	0–1	Manchester City	Hetton-le-Hole
			Georgia Stanway 90'	Stadium: The Hetton Centre; Attendance: 1,054; Referee: Andrew Miller

3 June 2017 8	Liverpool	1–3	Manchester City	Widnes
			Scott 30'; Lawley 45'; Megan Campbell 62'	Stadium: Halton Stadium; Attendance: 1,508; Referee: Peter Gibbons

=== FA Cup ===
18 March 2017 Fifth round	Manchester City	1–0	Reading	Manchester
14:00 GMT (UTC+00:00)	Bronze 82'	Report		Stadium: Academy Stadium; Referee: Aaron Jackson

26 March 2017 Sixth round	Bristol City	1–2	Manchester City	Filton
14:00 BST (UTC+01:00)	Emslie 45'	Report	Ladd OG 7'; Parris 88'	Stadium: Stoke Gifford Stadium; Attendance: 594

17 April 2017 Semi-final	Manchester City	1–0	Liverpool	Manchester
14:00 BST (UTC+01:00)	Lawley 58'	Report		Stadium: Academy Stadium; Attendance: 3,459; Referee: Sarah Garratt

13 May 2017 Final	Birmingham City	1–4	Manchester City	London
17:15 BST (UTC+01:00)	Wellings 73'	Report	Bronze 17'; Christiansen 24'; Lloyd 31'; Scott 80'	Stadium: Wembley Stadium; Attendance: 35,271; Referee: Rebecca Welch

=== Champions League ===
Campaign continued from the previous season

==== Quarter-finals ====
23 March 2017 First leg	Fortuna Hjørring (Denmark)	0–1	(England) Manchester City	Hjørring
17:00 GMT (UTC+00:00)		Report	Lloyd 36'	Stadium: Hjørring Stadium; Referee: Riem Hussein

30 March 2017 Second leg	Manchester City (England)	1–0	(Denmark) Fortuna Hjørring	Manchester
19:00 BST (UTC+01:00)	Bronze 41'	Report		Stadium: Academy Stadium; Attendance: 2,152; Referee: Anastasia Pustovoitova

==== Semi-finals ====
22 April 2017 First leg	Manchester City (England)	1–3	(France) Lyon	Manchester
14:00 BST (UTC+01:00)	Asllani 16'	Report	Kumagai 1'; Marozsán 16'; Le Sommer 68'	Stadium: Academy Stadium; Attendance: 3,548; Referee: Katalin Kulcsar

29 April 2017 Second leg	Lyon (France)	0–1	(England) Manchester City	Décines, France
20:45 CET (UTC+01:00)		Report	Lloyd 57'	Stadium: Parc Olympique Lyonnais; Attendance: 19,214; Referee: Esther Staubli

== Squad information ==
=== Playing statistics ===
As of the end of the season

Appearances (Apps.) numbers are for appearances in competitive games only including sub appearances
Red card numbers denote: Numbers in parentheses represent red cards overturned for wrongful dismissal.

No.	Nat.	Player	Pos.	WSL				FA Cup				Champions League				Total			
No.	Nat.	Player	Pos.	Apps	Goal	Booked	Sent off (straight red)	Apps	Goal	Booked	Sent off (straight red)	Apps	Goal	Booked	Sent off (straight red)	Apps	Goal	Booked	Sent off (straight red)
1	(England)	Karen Bardsley	GK	2				3				3				8			
2	(England)	Lucy Bronze	DF	5	1			4	2			3	1			12	4		
3	(England)	Demi Stokes	DF	4				4				3				11			
4	(Netherlands)	Tessel Middag	MF	2				1				2				5			
5	(Scotland)	Jen Beattie	DF	4												4			
6	(England)	Steph Houghton	DF	5				4	1			3				12	1		
7	(Sweden)	Kosovare Asllani	FW	4	1			1				3	1			8	2		
8	(England)	Jill Scott	MF	5	3			3	1			3				11	4		
9	(England)	Toni Duggan	FW	3	4			3				2				8	4		
10	(United States)	Carli Lloyd	MF	3		1		4	1			3	2			10	3	1	
11	(England)	Isobel Christiansen	MF	5				3	1			1				9	1		
12	(England)	Georgia Stanway	FW	4	1			3				1				8	1		
14	(England)	Melissa Lawley	MF	2	1			4	1			2				8	2		
16	(Scotland)	Jane Ross	FW	3	2			3				2				8	2		
17	(England)	Nikita Parris	FW	3	2			4	1			2				9	3		
20	(Republic of Ireland)	Megan Campbell	DF	5	1			1								6	1		
21	(England)	Marie Hourihan	GK	1				1								2			
23	(England)	Abbie McManus	DF	2				4				3				9			
24	(England)	Keira Walsh	MF	5				4				3				12			
26	(England)	Ellie Roebuck	GK	2												2			
Own goals					1				0				0				1		
Totals					17	1	0		8	0	0		4	0	0		29	1	0

=== Goalscorers ===
Includes all competitive matches. The list is sorted alphabetically by surname when total goals are equal.

Correct as of 25 May 2017

No.	Nat.	Player	Pos.	WSL	FA Cup	Champions League	TOTAL
2	(England)	Lucy Bronze	DF	1	2	1	4
9	(England)	Toni Duggan	FW	4	0	0	4
8	(England)	Jill Scott	MF	3	1	0	4
10	(United States)	Carli Lloyd	MF	0	1	2	3
17	(England)	Nikita Parris	FW	2	1	0	3
16	(Scotland)	Jane Ross	FW	2	0	0	2
7	(Sweden)	Kosovare Asllani	FW	1	0	1	2
14	(England)	Melissa Lawley	MF	1	1	0	2
11	(England)	Isobel Christiansen	MF	0	1	0	1
6	(England)	Steph Houghton	DF	0	1	0	1
12	(England)	Georgia Stanway	FW	1	0	0	1
20	(Republic of Ireland)	Megan Campbell	FW	1	0	0	1
Own Goals				1	0	0	1
Total				17	8	4	29

== Transfers and loans ==
=== Transfers in ===
Date	Position	No.	Player	From club
22 December 2016	MF	14	(England) Melissa Lawley	(England) Birmingham City
15 February 2017	MF	10	(United States) Carli Lloyd	(United States) Houston Dash

=== Transfers out ===
Date	Position	No.	Player	To club
19 January 2017	MF	10	(United States) Daphne Corboz	(United States) Sky Blue FC
