= Carola Schneider =

Danish footballer (born 1993)

Personal information
- Full name: Carola Reusing Schneider
- Date of birth: 11 March 1993 (age 33)
- Place of birth: Kolding, Denmark
- Height: 1.76 m (5 ft 9 in)
- Position: Midfielder

Team information
- Current team: KoldingQ
- Number: 20

Youth career
- 1999-2013: Kolding IF
- 2015-2017: KoldingQ

College career
Years	Team	Apps	(Gls)
2013-2015	Lindsey Wilson College		

Senior career*
Years	Team	Apps	(Gls)
2017-	KoldingQ	64	(1)

International career^{‡}
2011-2012	Denmark U19	9	(1)
- * Club domestic league appearances and goals as of 12 June 2020 ‡ National team caps and goals as of 12 June 2020

Carola Schneider (born 11 March 1993) is a Danish footballer who plays as a midfielder for KoldingQ in the Elitedivisionen and formerly for the Denmark women's national under-19 football team. She has also playing college soccer in the United States for Lindsey Wilson College in 2013, until she went back to Denmark in KoldingQ, in 2015.

She participated at the 2012 UEFA Women's Under-19 Championship in Turkey.

== Honours ==
=== Club ===
KoldingQ

- Danish Cup
  - Runners-up: 2018
