= Sherry McCue =

English football player

Personal information
- Date of birth: 16 September 1994 (age 32)
- Position: Midfielder

Team information
- Current team: Derby County

Sherry McCue (born 16 September 1994) is an English footballer who plays for Derby County. McCue previously played for Aston Villa and Leicester City.

== International career ==
Sherry McCue has capped at all youth levels for England. McCue participated at the 2014 FIFA U-20 Women's World Cup.
