= Nikita Parris =

English footballer (born 1994)

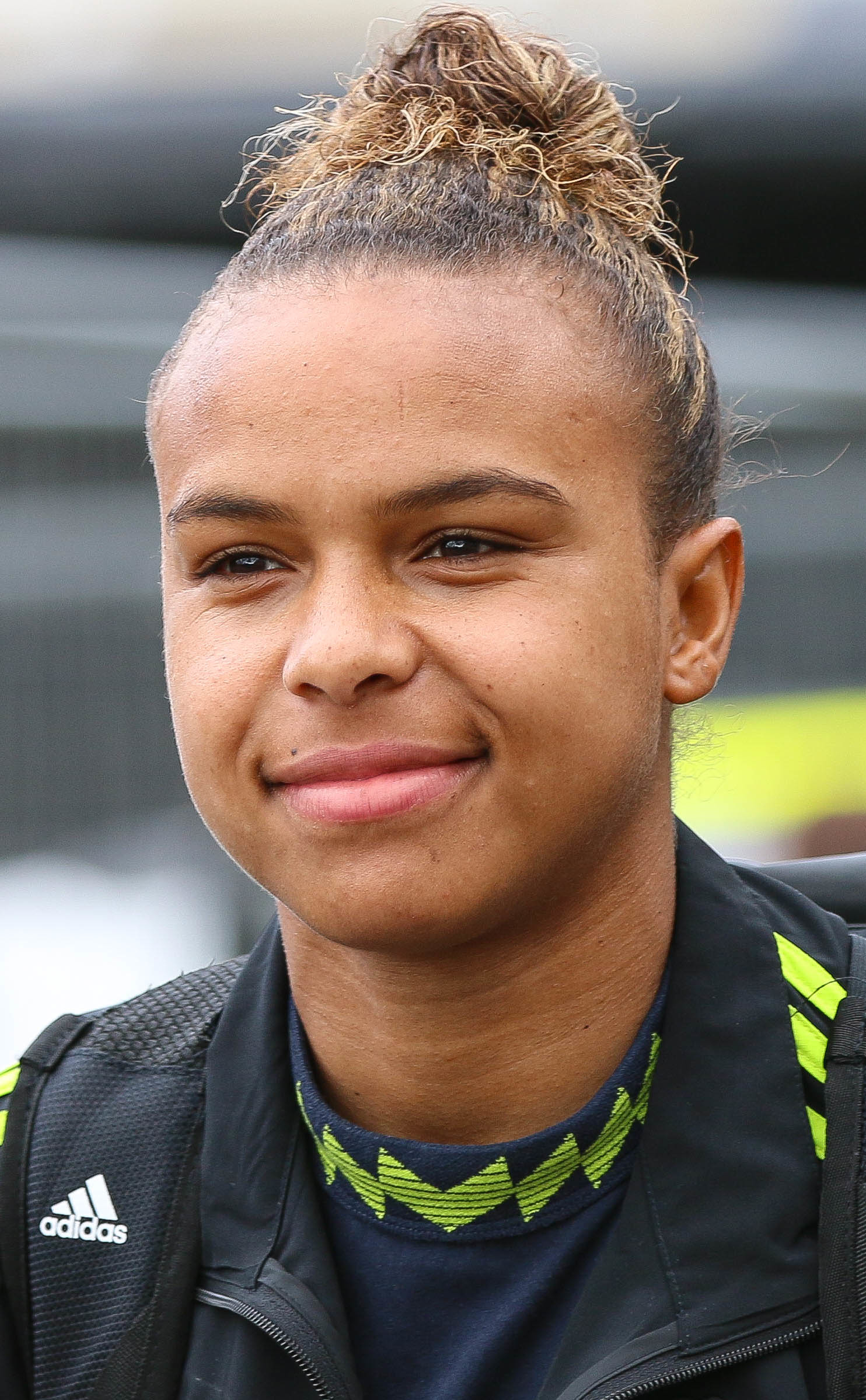
- Parris playing for Manchester United in 2023

Personal information
- Full name: Nikita Josephine Parris
- Date of birth: 10 March 1994 (age 32)
- Place of birth: Toxteth, Liverpool, England
- Height: 1.62 m (5 ft 4 in)
- Position: Forward

Team information
- Current team: London City Lionesses
- Number: 17

Youth career
- Kingsley United
- 2008–2010: Everton

Senior career*
Years	Team	Apps	(Gls)
2011–2015	Everton	38	(12)
2015	→ Manchester City (loan)	13	(4)
2016–2019	Manchester City	59	(33)
2019–2021	Olympique Lyonnais	35	(21)
2021–2022	Arsenal	18	(1)
2022–2024	Manchester United	42	(12)
2024–2025	Brighton & Hove Albion	22	(7)
2025-	London City Lionesses	21	(4)

International career^{‡}
2009–2010	England U17	8	(2)
2010–2013	England U19	26	(18)
2014	England U20	3	(1)
2014–2016	England U23	12	(6)
2016–	England	74	(17)
2021	Great Britain	4	(0)
Medal record
Women's football
Representing England
UEFA Women's Championship
Winner	2022 England
- * Club domestic league appearances and goals as of 18 October 2026 ‡ National team caps and goals as of 8 April 2025

Nikita Josephine Parris (born 10 March 1994) is an English professional footballer who plays as a forward for Women's Super League club London City Lionesses and the England national team. She previously played for Division 1 club Olympique Lyonnais, Manchester City, Everton, Arsenal, Manchester United and Brighton & Hove Albion.

From 2018 to 2020, Parris held the record as all-time leading scorer in the Women's Super League. With Olympique Lyonnais, Parris has won the 2019–20 Champions League, the 2020 Coupe de France (Women's French Cup), the 2019 Trophée des Championnes, and the 2019 International Champions Cup. With Manchester City, she won the 2016 league title, the 2016 and 2018–19 League Cup as well as the 2016–17 and 2018–19 FA Cup.

Parris represented England from under-17 to under-23 youth levels, becoming a 2013 U-19 Championship runner-up with the under-19 team. She made her senior international debut in Euro 2017 qualifying, helping the national team reach the semi-finals of the Euro 2017, as well as a fourth-place finish at the 2019 World Cup. Her six goals during World Cup qualification ranked first within UEFA nations and secured England's place at the top tournament. She helped England win its first-ever SheBelieves Cup in 2019 and Arnold Clark Cup in 2022, as well as win the Euro 2022.

Parris was named the FWA Women's Footballer of the Year in 2019. She was included in The Guardian's list of The 100 Best Female Footballers In The World in 2018 and 2019.

== Early life and education ==
I always said to my mum, ‘I’m going to play football for a living’ and she was like ‘but girls don’t play football. There’s no team like the men. There’s no pathway.’ And I used to say, ‘But there will be.'

— Nikita Parris, Gaffer

Born on 10 March 1994 in Toxteth, an inner city area of Liverpool, Parris was raised with her twin sister and two brothers by her mother, Jo, who worked three jobs to support the family.

Parris attended St. Patrick's Primary School in Liverpool where she trained with the athletic team and dreamed of playing like Arsenal and Scottish international player Julie Fleeting. At age six, she began playing football with boys on a grass border near her home and continued playing with boys until she was sixteen. Every time her mother looked out, she would see Parris slide tackling the boys or them slide tackling her.

As a youth, Parris started her own football team: "I started a football team myself at the age of eleven because I wanted to have a women’s team in the local community. So, I gathered all my friends and family and everyone I knew... and we were successful. We won the league." Parris' sister and two cousins also played in the team, which was called Kingsley United. As part of the "Where Greatness Is Made" campaign, a plaque honouring Parris was installed at the club in 2022.

Parris was a girlhood Liverpool FC supporter. Her mother often bought her the latest kit, and she would emulate her favourite players Michael Owen, Fernando Torres and Luis Suárez. At age ten, Parris was recruited by Mo Marley, head coach of Everton. At the time, Parris did not want to leave, but later joined Everton's Centre of Excellence at age 14.

Parris attended Bellerive FCJ Catholic College, but in September 2010 switched to Cardinal Heenan Catholic High School for her sixth form education, because it was a specialist sports college. She earned a degree in sports development from Liverpool John Moores University.

== Club career ==
=== Everton ===
"The first time she showed up at trials and training for our younger age groups at Everton her pace and physical presence stood out and that's something you see on the world stage. She was doing those nutmegs to some of the more experienced heads in Everton when she was breaking through and got a few kicks as reminders not to be too cheeky to the senior pros, but that's Nikita. She's got a creative mind and you only have to see her interviews after the game – she hasn't changed. She's still that humble person who wants to better herself and she's always had that ambition to be one of the best players in the world in her position."

— Andy Spence, former Everton Ladies' Centre of Excellence coach, ESPN

Parris made her senior-team debut (Note: The FA archives report Parris played 45 minutes on 9 May 2010. Everton's website gives her senior-team debut a few months later in August, in the Champions League match.) for Everton in May 2010 at the age of 16 in an away game against Arsenal, coming on as a second-half substitute. In August 2010, she played her second match during the qualifying tournament for the 2010–11 UEFA Women's Champions League. During a match against Borec on 7 August 2010 she scored a brace, helping Everton to a 10–0 win. Parris played in five matches for Everton during the 2010–11 UEFA Women's Champions League. The following year, she was named to Everton's squad for the inaugural season of the Women's Super League (FA WSL). She made three appearances during the 2011 FA WSL season.

During the 2012 FA WSL season, Parris played in 10 matches, starting five. The 2013 season marked the start of Parris' goalscoring prowess for Everton. She scored six goals in 11 games. She scored the game-winning goal in a 1–0 win over Notts County on 15 September. Her two goals against Liverpool on 12 September were Everton's only goals in the 4–2 loss. Everton finished in third place during the regular season with a 7–3–4 record.

Parris scored 11 goals in 19 games during the 2014 season, but Everton went winless in the league and were relegated to FA WSL 2. Following her 2014 performance, she was placed on the shortlist for the 2015 PFA Women's Young Player of the Year, was selected for the WSL Team of the Year, and was named Everton's Player of the Year.

==== Manchester City (loan) ====
Parris joined Manchester City on a season-long loan in January 2015, reuniting with former teammates Toni Duggan and Jill Scott, who had left Everton two seasons prior, as she thought she needed to play in WSL 1 to contend for a place on the senior England national team. Parris scored four goals in 13 matches. She scored her first goal — a game-winner — during a match against Sunderland when she headed in from a corner kick in the 17th minute. During a match against Liverpool, she scored an equaliser in the 54th minute, another header, this time off of Izzy Christiansen's free-kick. Manchester City finished in second place during the regular season with a 9–2–3 record.

=== Manchester City ===
Parris signed with Manchester City on a two-year contract in January 2016. During the 2016 FA WSL season, she scored one goal in 16 games. On 29 April, her game-winning goal in the 40th minute cemented the team's 2–0 win against Sunderland. City finished in first place during the regular season with a 13–0–3 record. She played in all three games of the final stages of the League Cup helping Manchester City clinch the 2016 title.

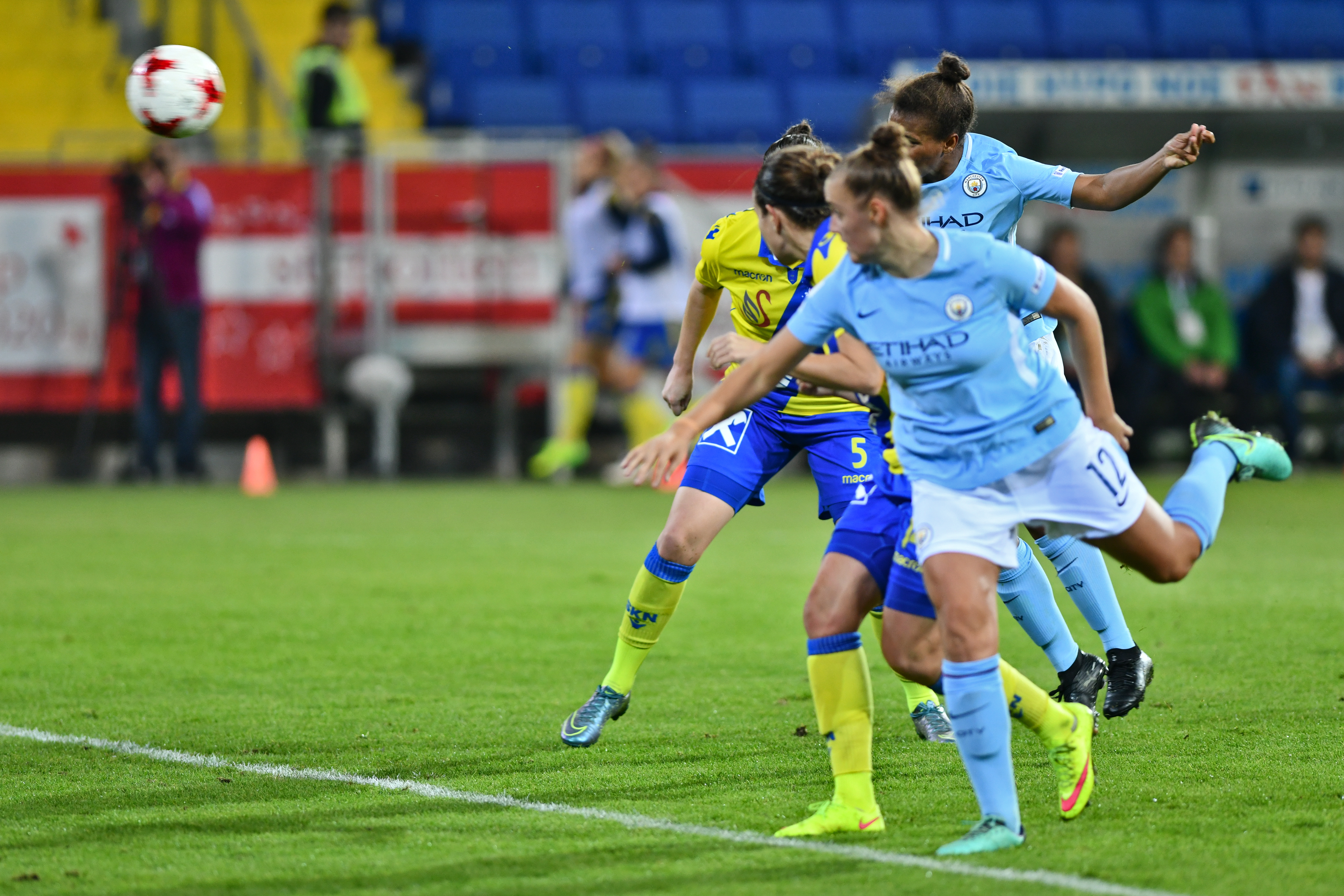
Parris heads the ball during a 2017–18 UEFA Women's Champions League match, October 2017

Parris made her UEFA Women's Champions League debut for Manchester City on 6 October 2016 during the team's 2–0 win over Zvezda-2005 Perm in the Round of 32 of the 2016–17 tournament. She competed in seven matches, helping Manchester City advance to the semi-finals where they were eliminated by Olympique Lyonnais.

During the FA WSL Spring Series in early 2017, she scored three goals in the six games that she played. Manchester City finished in fifth place with a 2–1–1 record. She helped the club clinch the 2016–17 FA Women's Cup the same year. During the 2017–18 FA WSL season, she was a starting forward in 17 of the 18 games she played and scored 11 goals, ranking second in the league behind Ellen White of Birmingham City. During the team's 3–0 win against Sunderland on 28 January 2018, she scored twice in the first half securing Manchester City's win and top position in the league. She scored her second brace of the season against Liverpool on 11 February to lift Manchester City back into first place. In May, she scored a hat-trick against Yeovil Town. Manchester City finished in second place during the regular season with a 12–4–2 record and secured a berth to the 2018–19 UEFA Women's Champions League (their third consecutive qualification).

Parris competed with Manchester City in eight matches of the 2017–18 UEFA Women's Champions League. She scored four goals throughout the tournament, including two game-winners against Lillestrøm, and Linköpings FC. Parris helped Manchester City reach the semi-finals where they were narrowly defeated 0–1 (aggregate) by eventual champions, Olympique Lyonnais.

In November 2017, Parris signed a new contract with Manchester City through the end of the 2018–19 FA WSL season. During the 2018–19 season, Parris scored 19 goals in 19 games. She was the second-highest scorer in the league for the season, the highest all-time WSL goalscorer, and second in the all-time assists. Parris began her season goal scoring with a brace in Manchester City's 4–0 win against Everton on 20 September. She scored another brace during the team's 7–1 win against West Ham United. At age 24, she became the Women's Super League's all-time top goalscorer on 4 November 2018 after scoring a brace in the team's 3–0 win against Liverpool. Her 37 goals inched ahead of former Chelsea striker Eniola Aluko. Of the notable record Parris said, "it's an amazing feeling. For me to be so young and be top goalscorer with plenty of years left in me – it bodes well for the future and hopefully it will continue." She scored her fourth brace of the season during a 3–0 win against Brighton & Hove Albion on 27 January 2019, including a penalty kick in the third minute of the match. Parris notched a hat-trick in the first half of the team's 4–3 win against Reading. Manchester City finished in second place behind Arsenal with a 14–1–5 record. Parris' brace against Chelsea in the semi-final earned City a berth to the 2018–19 FA Women's League Cup Final where they defeated Arsenal in penalty kicks after a 0–0 draw and extra time. The same year, she helped Manchester City win the 2018–19 FA Women's Cup in front of 43,264 fans at Wembley Stadium.

Parris competed with Manchester City in the team's two 2018–19 UEFA Women's Champions League Round of 32 matches where they were defeated 1–3 (aggregate) by Atlético Madrid.

On 11 May 2019, Parris announced she would leave City at the end of the 2018–19 season. During her time at Manchester City, Parris made 127 appearances for the club, and scored 62 goals. Her 25 assists ranked second all-time in the league after Karen Carney with 35. In 2019, Parris was voted the Football Writers’ Association Women's Player of the Year. The striker helped Manchester City win two FA Cups in 2017 and 2019, two Continental Cups, a league title and two Champions League semi-finals.

=== Olympique Lyonnais ===
On 19 June 2019, Division 1 Féminine side Olympique Lyonnais confirmed they had signed Parris on a three-year contract. Parris scored her first league goal for the club, on her debut, in a 6–0 win against Marseille on 24 August. Parris' two goals in a 5–0 home win over Montpellier on 23 February were her last of the season as the 2019–20 Division 1 Féminine season was curtailed by the COVID-19 pandemic in France. In 15 league appearances and 10 starts, Parris scored eight goals. Olympique Lyonnais finished first in the league and secured a berth to the 2020–21 UEFA Women's Champions League. Parris added four goals in six 2019–20 UEFA Women's Champions League appearances, but missed the final through suspension after she was sent off in a fractious semi-final win over rivals Paris Saint-Germain. Olympique Lyonnais won the Champions League title for the fifth consecutive time after defeating VfL Wolfsburg 3–1 in the 2020 UEFA Women's Champions League Final. This marked Olympique Lyonnais' seventh Champions League title.

Parris scored her first goal of the 2020–21 Division 1 Féminine season in a 3–0 win against Reims on 11 September 2020. During a match against Soyaux on 13 November, she scored a double to lift Olympique Lyonnais to a 5–1 win. She scored 4 goals in 26 minutes against Issy lifting Olympique Lyonnais to a 9–0 win in December. Parris scored a double against Paris FC on 22 January 2021 increasing her goal tally of the season to eleven.

=== Arsenal ===
Following two seasons with Olympique Lyonnais, Parris returned to the Super League, signing with Arsenal for a club-record fee on 2 July 2021. She scored her first goal for the club on her 18 August debut versus Okzhetpes in the Champions League. She scored her 50th goal in the WSL in the match against Aston Villa on 1 May 2022.

=== Manchester United ===
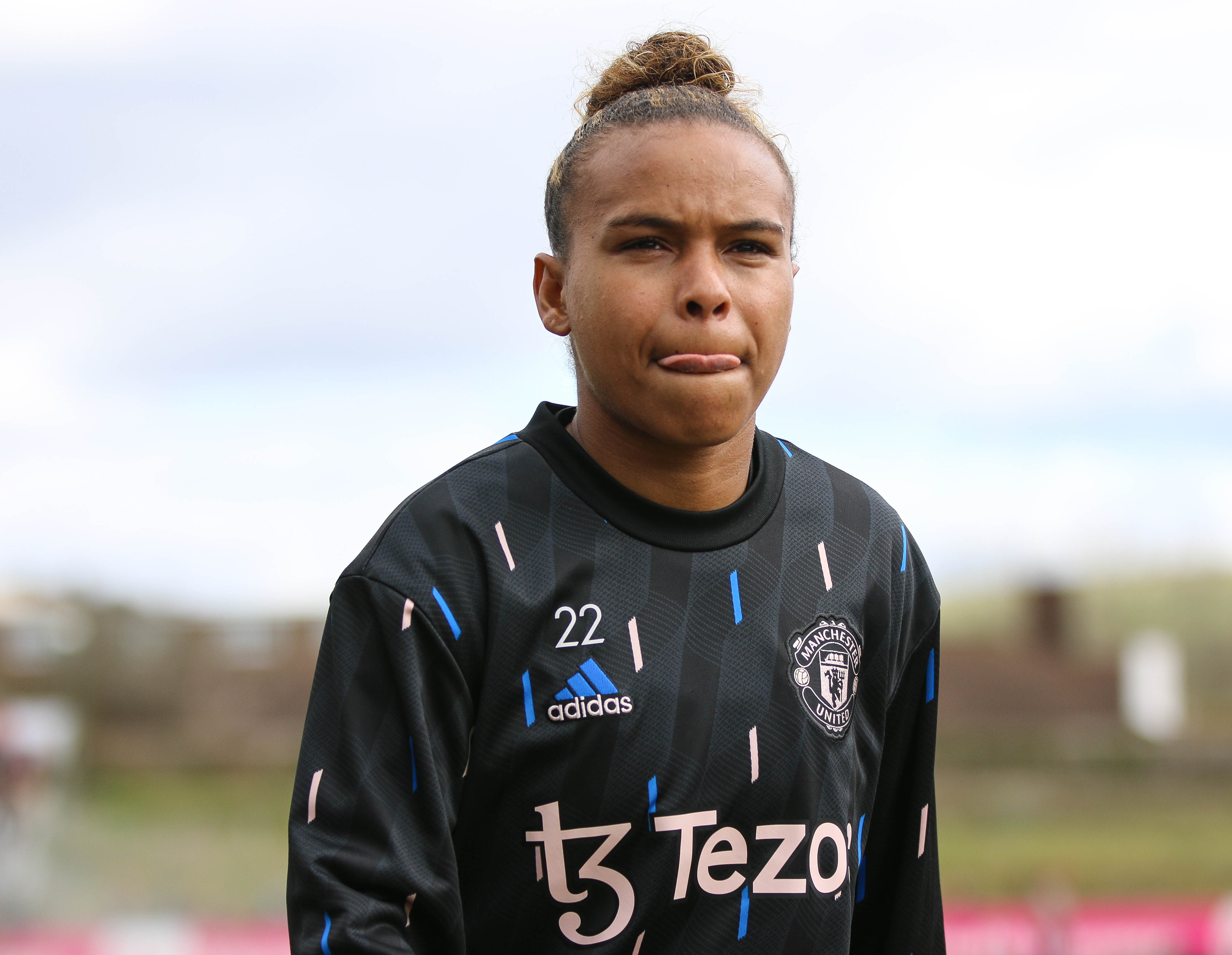
Parris with Manchester United

On 6 August 2022, Parris was confirmed to have signed for WSL club Manchester United.

In November 2023, after scoring 6 goals across 6 games, including a hat trick against Everton in the 2023–24 League Cup, Parris was voted Manchester United's Player of the Month with 64% of the fan vote. On 28 January 2024, Parris scored both goals in the 2–1 win against Aston Villa in the WSL, as United's top scorer for the season with 13 goals in 16 games, including 6 WSL goals and 5 League Cup goals. In May 2024, Parris was a part of the Man United squad that beat Tottenham 4–0 in the 2024 Women's FA Cup final.

=== Brighton & Hove Albion ===
On 13 September 2024, Parris joined fellow WSL side Brighton & Hove Albion. On 5 October, she scored her first goal for Brighton against Aston Villa in a 4–2 league win.

On 22 July 2025, it was announced that Parris had left Brighton following the expiry of her contract.

=== London City Lionesses ===
On the 26th of July 2025, newly promoted WSL club London City Lionesses announced that they had signed Parris on a two year contract. On 14 September 2025, Parris scored her first goal for the Lionesses in a 5–1 loss to her former club Manchester United.

== International career ==
=== England ===
==== Youth ====
Parris represented England from under-17 to under-23 age groups, scoring over 20 goals at youth level.

In 2012 U-19 Championship qualification, Parris scored the winning goal against Finland and a hat trick against Wales, helping England under-19s qualify for the final tournament. In April 2013, for 2013 U-19 Championship qualification, she scored against Hungary and Norway, followed by goals against Wales and Denmark in the final tournament in August 2013, with the under-19s becoming runners-up in the competition, as well as qualifying for the 2014 U-20 World Cup. Parris then represented the England under-20s at the U-20 World Cup, scoring the opening goal against Nigeria in a 2–1 defeat, as well as represented England U23 against Sweden and Norway in preparation in June 2014.

In 2015, she was described as an integral part of Mo Marley's under-23 squad, with the U23 manager confident she would reach the senior team, describing her as "a really, really good talented player", and that "hopefully a senior England squad call-up beckons for her".

==== Senior ====
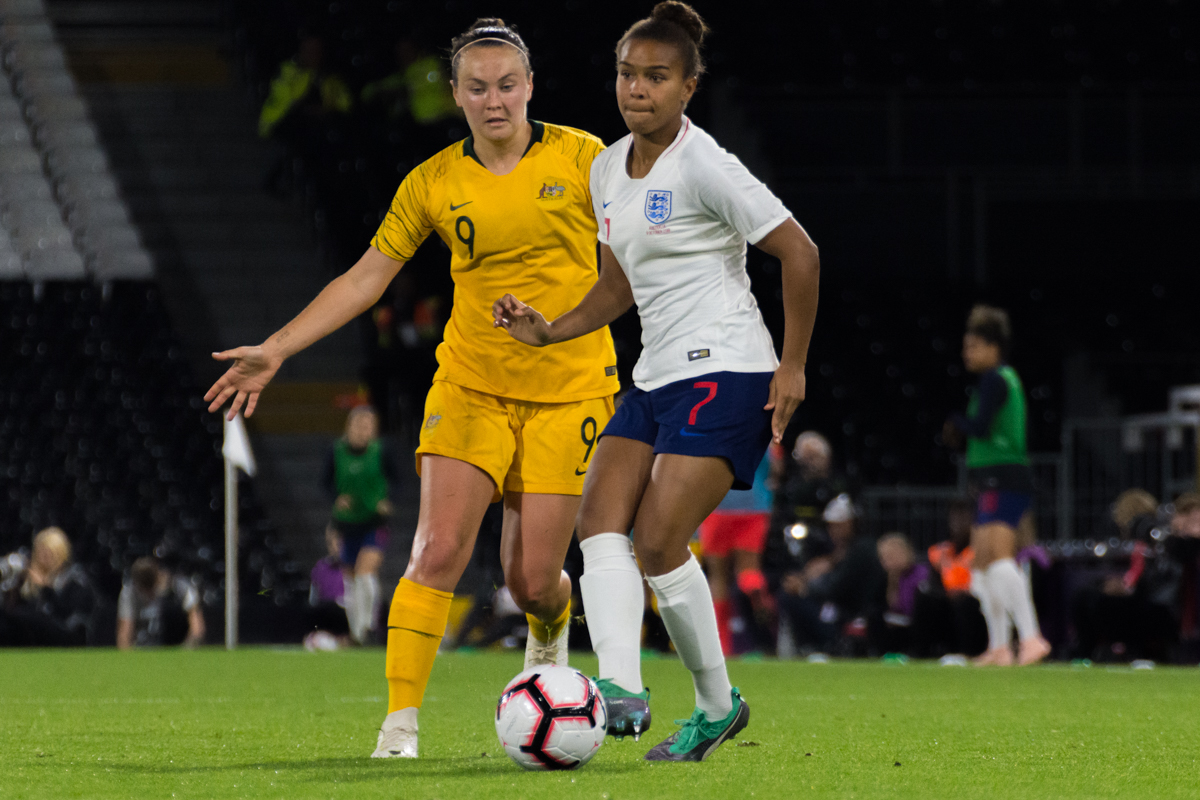
Parris (right) playing for England in October 2018

On 4 June 2016, Parris made her senior international debut for England as a substitute in England's Euro 2017 qualifying victory over Serbia. She registered one assist as England won 7–0. Three days later, Parris once again came off the bench in the reverse fixture, this time scoring twice as England repeated the 7–0 scoreline.

On 27 July 2017, Parris scored her first goal in a major tournament, netting the winner in England's 2–1 final group stage win against Portugal at Euro 2017. Parris and her England teammates pointedly ran to celebrate with coach Mark Sampson after her goal in their next match against Russia. At the time Sampson was facing various allegations of unfair treatment and discrimination towards teammate Eniola Aluko. Aluko stated, "For the most together team in the world tonight's "message" only shows a level of disrespect that represents division and selfish action" and later spotlighted the lack of diversity in English women's football. Sampson was fired the day after the Russia game but later won a "significant" settlement when he brought an unfair dismissal case against The FA. In June 2020, against the backdrop of the Black Lives Matter movement, Parris changed her mind about the situation and apologised to Aluko in an open letter. She called the celebration with coach Sampson a "thoughtless action" that showed ignorance as well as a lack of empathy and understanding.

England finished at the top of Group D after being undefeated in all three matches. After England defeated France 1–0 in the quarter-final, the team was defeated 3–0 in the semi-final by eventual champion the Netherlands.

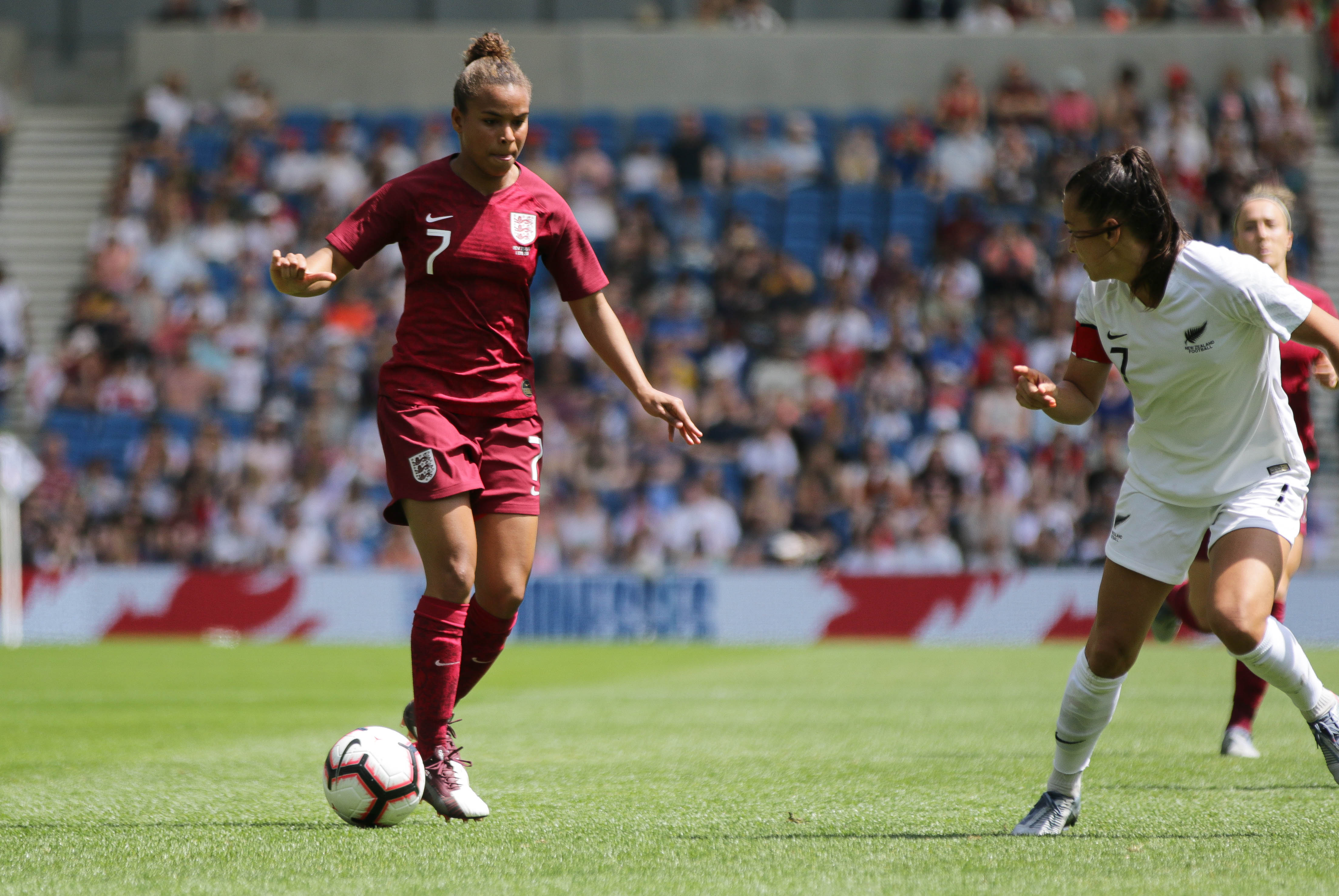
Nikita Parris (left) playing for England in 2019.

On 2 March 2019, Parris scored against the United States in a 2–2 draw at the 2019 SheBelieves Cup, a tournament England won for the first time. Her six goals ranked first in 2019 FIFA Women's World Cup qualification (UEFA) and helped secure a spot at the tournament later that year.

In 2019, Parris' spot on the England roster at the 2019 FIFA Women's World Cup was announced by David Beckham. Parris scored her first World Cup goal and England's first in the 2019 World Cup during their opening group game, a penalty in a 2–1 win over Scotland. She was named FIFA's Player of the Match. Parris also took a penalty in England's next game, the fourth consecutive World Cup match England had won a penalty in, but had it saved by Argentina goalkeeper Vanina Correa. England won 1–0. After Parris missed her second penalty in a 3–0 win over Norway in the quarter-final, England manager Phil Neville added: "She's missed two penalties and they have both been really good saves. She'll take the next one. She is our best penalty taker." However, when England were awarded yet another penalty in their 2–1 semi-final defeat by the United States, Neville demoted Parris from penalty-taking duties in favour of the captain Steph Houghton. Houghton's poorly-struck penalty was saved and England went on to finish the tournament in fourth place. On 28 August, Parris revived her penalty form by rescuing a 3–3 draw against Belgium in an international friendly. This was followed, five days later, by an assist for Georgia Stanway's opener in a 2–1 defeat to Norway.

In June 2022 Parris was included in the England squad which won the UEFA Women's Euro 2022.

Parris was allotted 196 when the FA announced their legacy numbers scheme to honour the 50th anniversary of England's inaugural international.

After a strong start to the season for Brighton & Hove Albion, Parris was called up for the upcoming Nations League matches, making a return to the squad following a two year absence.

On 26 February 2025, Parris came on as a substitute in their Nations League match against Spain. This marked her first match for England since 15 November 2022.

=== Great Britain ===
On 27 May 2021, Parris was called up for her first Olympic Games, being selected for the Great Britain team for the 2020 Summer Olympics. Parris scored in a pre-tournament friendly against New Zealand, with the match ending 3–0. She appeared in all four of Great Britain's tournament games.

== Career statistics ==
=== Club ===
As of match played 28 October 2026

Appearances and goals by club, season and competition
Club	Season	League			National Cup (Note: Includes the FA Cup and Coupe de France)		League Cup (Note: Includes the FA Women's League Cup)		Continental (Note: Includes the UEFA Champions League)		Total	
Club	Season	Division	Apps	Goals	Apps	Goals	Apps	Goals	Apps	Goals	Apps	Goals
Everton	2009–10	WPL National	1	0	0	0	0	0	0	0	1	0
Everton	2011	Women's Super League	3	0	0	0	0	0	5	2	8	2
Everton	2012	Women's Super League	10	0	0	0	3	0	—		13	0
Everton	2013	Women's Super League	11	6	1	1	3	2	—		15	9
Everton	2014	Women's Super League	13	6	3	3	3	1	—		19	10
Everton	Total		38	12	4	4	9	3	5	2	56	21
Manchester City (loan)	2015	Women's Super League	13	4	3	3	5	4	—		21	11
Manchester City	2016	Women's Super League	16	1	3	2	4	3	7	0	30	6
Manchester City	2017	Women's Super League	6	2	4	1	—		—		10	3
Manchester City	2017–18	Women's Super League	18	11	4	0	6	3	8	4	36	18
Manchester City	2018–19	Women's Super League	19	19	5	2	4	3	2	0	30	24
Manchester City	Total		72	37	19	8	19	13	17	4	127	62
Lyon	2019–20	D1 Féminine	15	8	5	6	—		6	4	26	18
Lyon	2020–21	D1 Féminine	20	13	1	0	—		6	2	27	15
Lyon	Total		35	21	6	6	0	0	12	6	53	33
Arsenal	2021–22	Women's Super League	18	1	7 (Note: Includes three appearances and one goal in the delayed 2020–21 Women's FA Cup)	2	1	0	12	3	38	6
Manchester United	2022–23	Women's Super League	21	4	4	4	2	1	—		27	9
Manchester United	2023–24	Women's Super League	21	8	5	3	4	5	0	0	30	16
Manchester United	Total		42	12	9	7	6	6	0	0	57	25
Brighton & Hove Albion	2024–25	Women's Super League	22	7	2	3	4	2	—		28	12
London City Lionesses	2025–26	Women's Super League	19	4	2	0	3	1	—		24	5
London City Lionesses	2026–27	Women's Super League	2	0	0	0	4	1	—		6	1
London City Lionesses	Total		21	4	2	0	7	2	—		30	6
Career total			248	94	49	30	46	25	46	15	389	165

=== International ===
As of match played 8 April 2025

Appearances and goals by year
Year	England		Great Britain	
Year	Apps	Goals	Apps	Goals
2016	6	3	—N/a	
2017	12	5	—N/a	
2018	10	2	—N/a	
2019	19	4	—N/a	
2020	3	0	—N/a	
2021	7	1	4	0
2022	14	2	—N/a	
2025	3	0	—N/a	
Total	74	17	4	0

International goals

As of match played 6 September 2022
Scores and results list England's goal tally first.

International goals scored by Nikita Parris representing England
Goal	Date	Venue	Opponent	Score	Result	Competition
England goals
1	7 June 2016	Sports Center of FA of Serbia, Stara Pazova, Serbia	Serbia	6–0	7–0	Euro 2017 qualifying
2	7 June 2016	Sports Center of FA of Serbia, Stara Pazova, Serbia	Serbia	7–0	7–0	Euro 2017 qualifying
3	20 September 2016	Den Dreef, Leuven, Belgium	Belgium	1–0	2–0	Euro 2017 qualifying
4	27 July 2017	Koning Willem II Stadion, Tilburg, Netherlands	Portugal	2–1	2–1	Euro 2017
5	19 September 2017	Prenton Park, Birkenhead, England	Russia	1–0	6–0	2019 World Cup qualifying
6	24 November 2017	Bescot Stadium, Walsall, England	Bosnia and Herzegovina	2–0	4–0	2019 World Cup qualifying
7	28 November 2017	Colchester Community Stadium, Colchester, England	Kazakhstan	3–0	5–0	2019 World Cup qualifying
8	28 November 2017	Colchester Community Stadium, Colchester, England	Kazakhstan	4–0	5–0	2019 World Cup qualifying
9	8 June 2018	Sapsan Arena, Moscow, Russia	Russia	1–0	3–1	2019 World Cup qualifying
10	31 August 2018	Rodney Parade, Newport, Wales	Wales	3–0	3–0	2019 World Cup qualifying
11	2 March 2019	Nissan Stadium, Nashville, United States	United States	2–1	2–2	2019 SheBelieves Cup
12	25 May 2019	Bescot Stadium, Walsall, England	Denmark	1–0	2–0	Friendly
13	9 June 2019	Allianz Riviera, Nice, France	Scotland	1–0	2–1	2019 Women's World Cup
14	29 August 2019	Den Dreef, Heverlee, Belgium	Belgium	3–3	3–3	Friendly
15	21 September 2021	Stade de Luxembourg, Luxembourg City, Luxembourg	Luxembourg	3–0	10–0	2023 World Cup qualifying
16	3 September 2022	Stadion Wiener Neustadt, Wiener Neustadt, Austria	Austria	2–0	2–0	2023 World Cup qualifying
17	6 September 2022	Bet365 Stadium, Stoke-on-Trent, England	Luxembourg	7–0	10–0	2023 World Cup qualifying
Great Britain goals
# (Note: An Olympics warm-up match behind closed doors and as such is not recognised by either football association as an official friendly, the goals scored do not count towards official statistics and are not included in the above table of international goals and appearances.)	14 July 2021	Kawasaki Todoroki Stadium, Tokyo, Japan	New Zealand	2–0	3–0	Friendly

== Honours ==
Manchester City

- FA Women's Super League: 2016
- FA Women's Cup: 2016–17, 2018–19
- FA WSL Cup: 2016, 2018–19

Olympique Lyonnais

- Division 1 Féminine: 2019–20
- Coupe de France: 2019–20
- Trophée des Championnes: 2019
- UEFA Women's Champions League: 2019–20

Manchester United

- Women's FA Cup: 2023–24; runner-up: 2022–23

England u19

- UEFA Women's Under-19 Championship runner-up: 2013

England

- UEFA Women's Championship: 2022
- SheBelieves Cup: 2019
- Arnold Clark Cup: 2022

Individual

- Everton Player of the Year: 2014
- FWA Women's Footballer of the Year: 2019
- Freedom of the City of London (announced 1 August 2022)
- Women's Super League: all-time leading scorer from 2018 to 2020

== Style of play ==
"International football’s a much quicker environment. You have to move the ball quicker and make decisions quicker. I’ve stretched myself and I make decisions very quickly now. You can’t overthink when chances come, you’ve got to take them. But I’ve also got more maturity, more composure in the final third. I’m calmer in front of goal. When I was younger, I was so fixed on scoring I’d snatch at chances. I’d forgotten about the process you need to go through before you shoot. Now I know that if you get that process right, scoring’s the easy part."

— Nikita Parris, June 2018

As a youth, Parris looked up to Arsenal and Scotland international, Julie Fleeting, who was known for scoring goals. Described by teammates as "down to earth" with "exceptional gifts framed by a fierce determination and a maturity", Parris is known for her wit, ability to learn quickly, and fast-moving feet.

Former England manager Phil Neville noted in 2019 that Parris is "world class". The Telegraph described her as "an exhilarating footballer, a pain to face on the pitch" and her style of play as "fast and clinical".

Gaffer described her greatest attribute as foresight and credited her for her "grounded, thoughtful and hungry" leadership qualities. Her sister, boxer Natasha Jonas, noted, "She will always try her best and give 100 percent. She will always come off that pitch with nothing left to give, so whatever happens you've just got to be proud of that."

== Personal life ==
Parris is a younger sister of boxer Natasha Jonas. Her first name is sometimes shortened to "Keets". She is a practising Catholic and a former altar girl.

In 2020, Parris founded the NP17 Football Academy, which offers sports qualifications to students in Liverpool. She noted, "That community gave me life and gave me an opportunity – that's what I want to do for these girls. I want to give them an opportunity to be successful in whatever they choose. Within inner city areas, there's always good and bad. You've got to be in and around the right people." The academy, based at The City of Liverpool College, is supported by international sportswear company Puma, which donates sports equipment. Other partners include the Liverpool City Council and the City of Liverpool College.

The same year, Parris worked with England's The Football Association (FA) and seven fellow high-profile footballers, including Harry Kane and Tyrone Mings, to form a panel focused on increasing the number of black, Asian and other minority ethnic people at senior levels within football. The expert panel "will be consulted over the development of the FA’s Leadership Diversity Code".

Parris is sponsored by multi-national finance company Visa and Puma. In June 2019, she was featured in a promotional video for Visa and the 2019 World Cup. Parris has been featured along with her national teammates in the EA Sports' FIFA video game series since FIFA 17, a year after women players were included in the game for the first time.

In June 2019, a large mural of Parris was unveiled on Liverpool's London Road. The same year, a Parris mural by Honduran artist Javier Espinal and local youth was unveiled at the Metropolitan Methodist Centre in Toxteth.

== See also ==
- List of UEFA Women's Championship goalscorers
- List of England women's international footballers
- List of FA WSL hat-tricks
