= Georgia Stanway =

English footballer (born 1999)

Georgia Stanway MBE
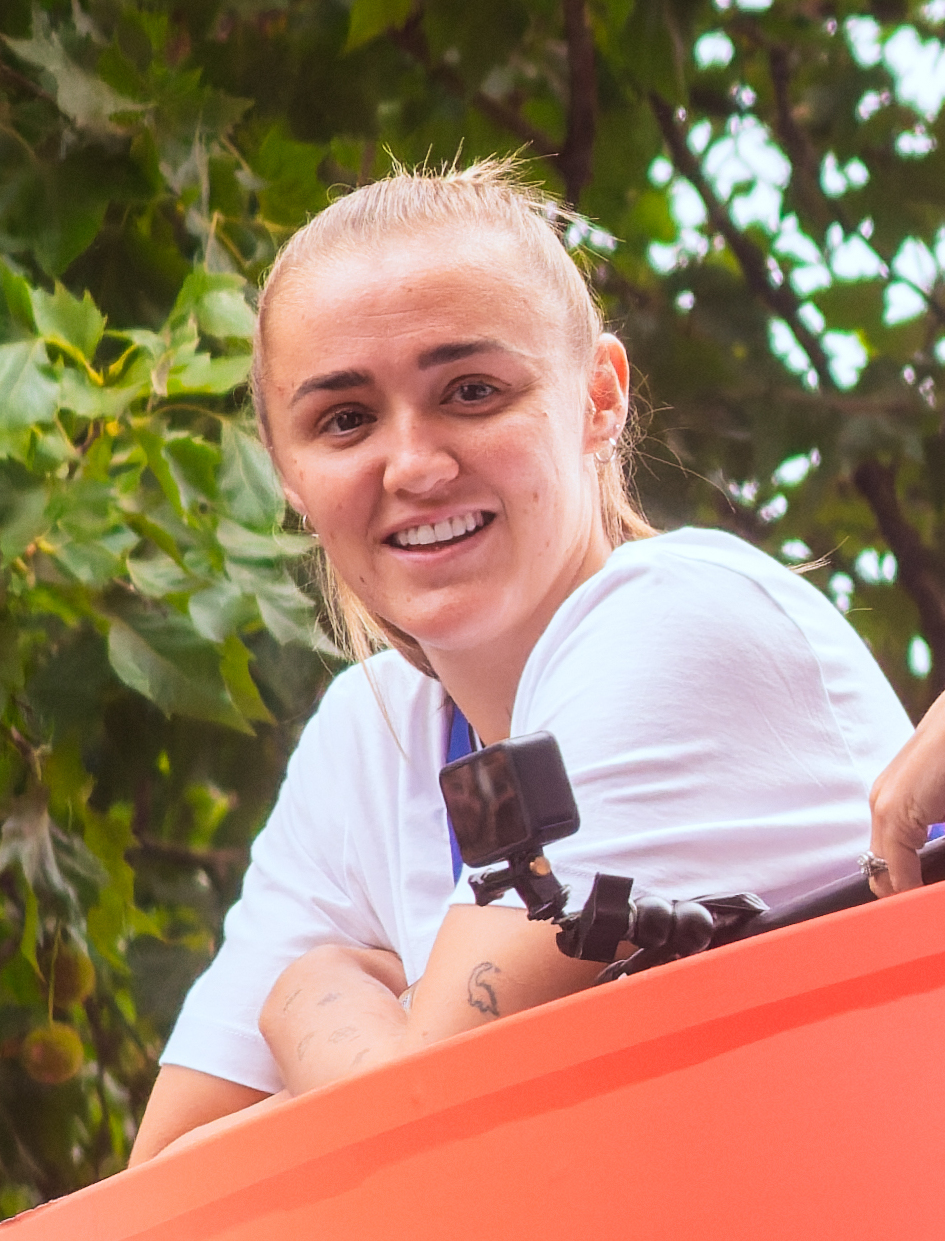
- Stanway in 2025

Personal information
- Full name: Georgia Marie Stanway
- Date of birth: 3 January 1999 (age 27)
- Place of birth: Barrow-in-Furness, England
- Height: 5 ft 5 in (1.64 m)
- Position: Midfielder

Team information
- Current team: Arsenal
- Number: 4

Youth career
- –2015: Blackburn Rovers

Senior career*
Years	Team	Apps	(Gls)
2015	Blackburn Rovers	5	(6)
2015–2022	Manchester City	109	(39)
2022–2026	Bayern Munich	79	(24)
2026–	Arsenal	11	(1)

International career^{‡}
2012–2014	England U15	1	(0)
2014	England U15 Schoolgirls	3	(3)
2014–2016	England U17	27	(23)
2017–2018	England U19	7	(6)
2018–2019	England U20	7	(6)
2018–	England	95	(35)
2021–	Great Britain	4	(0)
Medal record
Women's football
Representing England
UEFA Women's Championship
Winner	2022 England
Winner	2025 Switzerland
UEFA–CONMEBOL Finalissima
Winner	2023 England
FIFA Women's World Cup
Runner-up	2023 Australia and New Zealand
FIFA U-20 Women's World Cup
Third place	2018 France
- * Club domestic league appearances and goals as of 19:45, 22 November 2026 (UTC) ‡ National team caps and goals as of 21:45, 13 October 2026 (UTC)

Georgia Marie Stanway MBE (born 4 January 1999) is an English professional footballer who plays as a central midfielder for Arsenal in the Women's Super League and the England national team. Stanway started her senior career at Blackburn Rovers before joining Manchester City and winning the WSL in 2016, as well as three times the FA Cup and League Cup. She then moved to Frauen-Bundesliga club Bayern Munich, where she won four Frauen-Bundesliga titles, two DFB-Pokals and two DFB-Supercups. Stanway has also represented England at various youth levels, including captaining the U17 team, prior to scoring on her senior debut in 2018.

Stanway was nominated for BBC Young Sports Personality of the Year in 2016 and the PFA Women's Young Player of the Year in 2017. In June 2018, she was named in the UEFA Women's Champions League squad of the season, and in 2019, she was awarded PFA Women's Young Player of the Year. With England, Stanway is a Euro 2022 winner, scoring against Norway and Spain in the competition, two-time Arnold Clark Cup winner, a 2023 World Cup runner-up, and a winner of Euro 2025.

== Early years ==
Georgia Marie Stanway was born on 4 January 1999 in Barrow-in-Furness, in Cumbria, one of four siblings with three brothers, one of whom (Wyll Stanway) would also go on to be a professional footballer. She began playing football at a young age, as it was what her brothers did, and at the age of three was training with them in an under-7 team, saying that at that age she "didn't know what I was doing, I was just kicking the ball, but I loved it." She continued playing for boys' teams until she was thirteen; in 2022, as part of the "Where Greatness Is Made" campaign, a plaque honouring Stanway was installed at Furness Rovers. As well as football, Stanway played cricket alongside her brothers, and represented Cumbria in county cricket at under-13 and under-17 level.

She also represented Cumbria in football, playing for Cumbria Schoolgirls in English Schools' Football Association competitions at regional level in 2013 and 2014; though the county team lost all their matches, Stanway was selected for the newly created England Schoolgirls under-15 international squad that won the Bob Docherty Cup in 2014. She was the only player to score in all of their matches. Stanway then left Cumbria for Manchester aged sixteen to pursue a professional football career, joining Manchester City. Having attended the Dowdales School in Cumbria, she attended St Bede's College in Manchester, as teammate Keira Walsh had before her.

== Club career ==
=== Blackburn Rovers ===
==== Youth ====
Stanway started her career at Blackburn Rovers, playing through the youth system.

In the 2013–14 season she played for the under-15 team, making fifteen appearances and scoring ten of their twenty-two goals. At the end of the season in May 2014 she received the Under-15 Manager's Player award. She was with the under-17 team in the 2014–15 season, playing in fewer matches (fourteen) but managing to score thirty-one goals: among them were three hat-tricks, a super hat-trick, a match of five goals, and a double hat-trick. (Note: Hat-tricks: Super hat-trick: Five goals: Double hat-trick:) She scored once in the third round FA Girls' Youth Cup tie that they lost 2–3.

==== Senior, 2015 ====
She made it into the senior squad as a teenager, eligible to play from the end of January 2015. She came on as a substitute in their Women's FA Cup third round tie in February, scoring towards the end of the match that they eventually lost 4–5 to Portsmouth. The same weekend, she played for the under-17 Blackburn side in their FA Youth Cup second round tie, scoring twice in a solid team victory.

She also featured in the FA Women's Premier League in 2015, debuting in the league in early March and nearly scoring. She opened her account with a brace in a 6–0 win in April; her next two goals came as the team's sole tally in losses before she managed another brace and an assist to help the team to a 4–4 draw in the last game of the season. With the first team she scored a total seven goals in six matches.

=== Manchester City ===
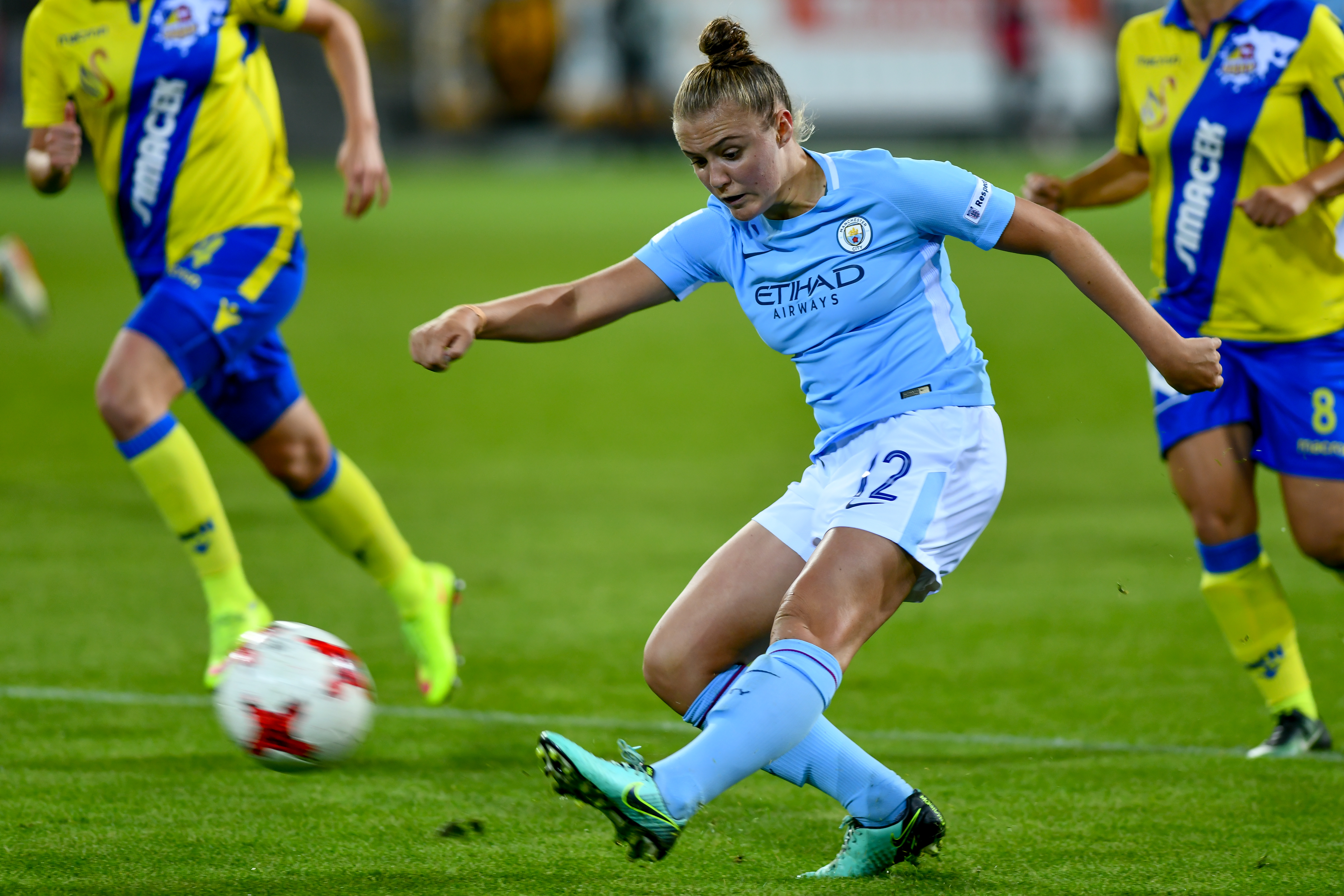
Stanway playing for Manchester City during the 2017–18 Champions League

On 18 July 2015, Stanway completed a move to Manchester City. On 29 July, Stanway made her senior debut for Manchester City as a substitute in a 5–0 win over Durham in the Continental Cup. On 27 August, she scored her first goal in a 2–0 victory against Everton. She ended her maiden campaign with the club's Rising Star award. In 2016, she won the Nissan Goal of the Season award. In January 2017, she signed a new contract with the club.

Her performances in the 2017–18 season led her to be named in the UEFA Women's Champions League Team of the Season. The following season, she was awarded the PFA Women's Young Player of the Year award, and nominated for the Northwest Football Women's Rising Star Award.

On 17 November 2019, Stanway scored two goals before being sent off, after receiving two yellow cards, in a 5–0 league win against West Ham United. She began the 2020–21 season by scoring a brace in a 2–0 away league win against Aston Villa.

In the first Manchester derby of the 2021–22 season, Stanway received a straight red card for a high challenge on Leah Galton in the 35th minute, with the score at 0–0. Despite this, Manchester City claimed a 2–2 draw. Stanway went on to win the FA WSL Goal of the Month award for December 2021. On 29 January 2022, Stanway became Manchester City's highest women's goalscorer after scoring a hat trick in an 8–0 win against Nottingham Forest in the fourth round of the 2021–22 Women's FA Cup. Injuries in the team for the first half of this season saw Stanway cycle through positions – nominally a forward at the start, she spent time as the first available right-back, in defensive midfield, and at one point was the second-choice goalkeeper. While coach Gareth Taylor praised her versatility, and Stanway said she would do whatever the team needed, she was frustrated with the situation. After teammates returned in the new year, she was able to play a string of games as a central midfielder and felt she was showing her best form, saying in March 2022 that in future she did not want to be a versatile player.

=== Bayern Munich ===
On 17 May 2022, it was announced that Stanway had signed a three-year deal with Frauen-Bundesliga club Bayern Munich. This was extended on 27 September 2023 for another year, bringing her contract up to 2026.

She made her debut on 16 August 2022 in a 2–1 friendly win over Barcelona. She received her first Bundesliga yellow card in her first league match for Bayern Munich; by the end of October 2022, Deutsche Welle noted that Stanway's time in the club had been "characterized more by yellow cards than goals". On 27 October, Stanway scored a brace to be her first goals for Bayern Munich in a 3–2 away win against Benfica in the Champions League.

Stanway won the Frauen-Bundesliga in both of her first two years abroad at Bayern and firmly established herself as a key player in their starting team. Her consistent form saw her win the 2022-23 Fans' Player of the Season award and also earned her a 2023 Ballon d'Or nomination, where she placed 23rd in the final ranking.

She scored six goals in each of her first two campaigns, and in May 2024, the midfielder became the first player to score in four consecutive appearances in the 2023–24 Frauen-Bundesliga.

On 30 January 2025, Bayern Munich announced that Stanway had suffered a lateral collateral ligament knee injury, and had undergone a successful operation, stating that she will be out for several months. Prior to her injury, Stanway scored six goals in 21 matches in the 2024-25 campaign to help Bayern win their first-ever domestic double.

On 10 January 2026, Stanway announced that she had decided to not renew her contract and would leave Bayern after four years at the club at the end of the 2025–26 season.

=== Arsenal ===
On 3 July 2026, it was announced that Stanway had signed a permanent deal with Women's Super League club Arsenal on a three year deal with a plus-one option and would wear the number 4 shirt.

== International career ==
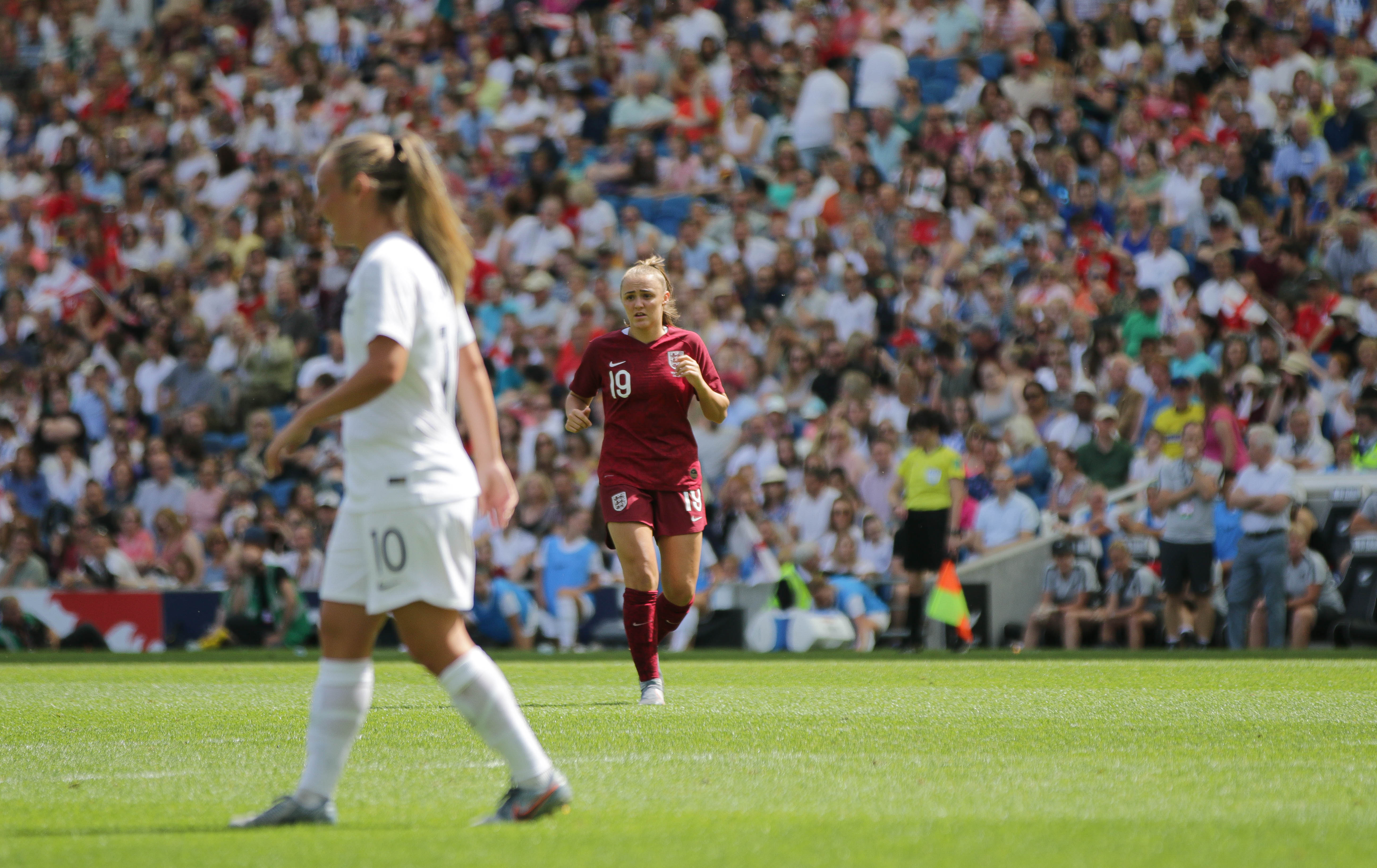
Stanway (number 19) playing for England in 2019

=== Youth ===
Stanway was first called up to train with the under-15 team in June 2012, being regularly invited to camps in 2013 and 2014. In March 2014 she was named as a forward to a squad for the following month and in May she scored a brace in a 3–0 defeat of the Netherlands. She then joined the under-17 squad for the Nordic Cup camp in July 2014. In October and November 2014 she played for the under-17s in 2015 UEFA Women's Under-17 Championship qualification matches, netting seven goals (including a hat-trick against Russia) as England's top-scorer to see them through to the final tournament. She was not in the 2015 U-17 Euro squad as the team went out in the group stages, instead playing in the Nordic Cup.

In 2016, Stanway captained the under-17 team to a bronze medal at the 2016 Euros, qualifying for the World Cup. In 2018, Stanway played a pivotal role in England's 2018 FIFA U-20 Women's World Cup campaign in France. Stanway scored six times (same as Golden Boot winner Patricia Guijarro but beaten only on assists) as England went on to finish third.

=== Senior ===
Stanway scored her first England goal, on her debut, in a 3–0 friendly victory against Austria on 8 November 2018. Stanway scored her second international goal in a 2–1 defeat to Norway in September 2019. On 27 May 2021 it was announced that Stanway had been selected as one of five strikers in the Great Britain women's Olympic football team for the delayed 2020 Olympics.

When Sarina Wiegman took over the Lionesses, Stanway initially struggled for minutes, attributed to constantly playing out of position for City and not giving the new coach much to go on; she was in better form in her preferred position by the Arnold Clark Cup in February 2022 and made the start list for the squad.

In June 2022 Stanway was included in the England squad which won the UEFA Women's Euro 2022, scoring the winner with a "22-yard rocket of a shot" in England's 2–1 win over Spain in the quarter-final. Stanway played 89 minutes in the final win over Germany.

Stanway was the 209th player to represent the England women's team, and was given this as her legacy number by the FA to honour the 50th anniversary of the team.

On 31 May 2023, Stanway was named to the squad for the 2023 FIFA Women's World Cup in July 2023. Stanway scored the only goal of the match via a penalty in the opening World Cup game against Haiti and helped the Lionesses reach the final of the tournament.

After making her return from her lateral collateral ligament knee injury in the international fixtures prior to the tournament, Stanway was named in England's squad for UEFA Women's Euro 2025 on 6 June 2025. She started in all six of the Lionesses' matches, including in the tournament's final on 27 July, with England defeating Spain 3-1 on penalties after a 1-1 draw to win a second consecutive European Championship.

On 3rd March 2026, Stanway reached the top 10 goal scorers of all time, scoring two goals in a 6-1 to Ukraine, during the 2027 FIFA Women's World Cup qualifiers, taking her to 9th overall with 31 goals at the time.

== Personal life ==
Stanway grew up idolising Alan Shearer and supports Newcastle United. Already having multiple tattoos, she developed an interest in tattooing after moving to Munich; she tattooed a person live on BBC Sport's "Out of Office" series in 2024. She was in a relationship with Toulouse Olympique rugby league footballer Olly Ashall-Bott as of 2022. As of 2025, she is in a relationship with German Olympic surfer Camilla Kemp.

== Career statistics ==
=== Club ===
As of 22 November 2026.

Appearances and goals by club, season and competition
Club	Season	League			National cup (Note: Includes Women's FA Cup, DFB-Pokal Frauen)		League cup (Note: Includes WSL Cup/Women's League Cup)		Europe (Note: Includes UEFA Women's Champions League)		Other		Total	
Club	Season	Division	Apps	Goals	Apps	Goals	Apps	Goals	Apps	Goals	Apps	Goals	Apps	Goals
Blackburn Rovers	2014–15	WPL Northern	5	6	1	1	—		—		—		6	7
Manchester City	2015	WSL 1	3	1	0	0	2	1	0	0	—		5	2
Manchester City	2016	WSL 1	10	4	3	1	2	1	1	0	—		16	6
Manchester City	2017	WSL 1	7	1	0	0	0	0	2	0	—		9	0
Manchester City	2017–18	WSL 1	14	5	1	0	4	3	7	2	—		26	10
Manchester City	2018–19	WSL	19	11	3	2	6	2	2	0	—		30	15
Manchester City	2019–20	WSL	13	4	1	0	4	0	2	1	—		20	5
Manchester City	2020–21	WSL	21	5	1	0	4	0	6	3	1 (Note: Appearance in Women's FA Community Shield)	0	33	8
Manchester City	2021–22	WSL	22	8	5	3	5	1	1	0	—		33	13
Manchester City	Total		109	39	14	6	27	8	21	6	1	0	172	59
Bayern Munich	2022–23	Frauen-Bundesliga	21	6	4	1	—		10	3	—		35	10
Bayern Munich	2023–24	Frauen-Bundesliga	21	6	5	1	—		6	0	—		32	7
Bayern Munich	2024–25	Frauen-Bundesliga	12	5	2	1	—		6	0	1 (Note: Appearance in DFB-Supercup)	0	21	6
Bayern Munich	2025–26	Frauen-Bundesliga	25	7	5	1	—		9	0	1	1	40	9
Bayern Munich	Total		79	24	16	4	—		31	3	2	1	128	32
Arsenal	2026–27	WSL	11	1	0	0	—		4	1	—		15	2
Career total			204	70	31	11	27	8	56	10	3	1	321	100

=== International ===
Statistics accurate as of match played 13 October 2026.

Appearances and goals by national team and year
Year	England		Great Britain	
Year	Apps	Goals	Apps	Goals
2018	2	1	—N/a	
2019	14	1	—N/a	
2020	3	0	—N/a	
2021	7	2	4	0
2022	15	10	—N/a	
2023	18	3	—N/a	
2024	12	4	—N/a	
2025	12	8	—N/a	
2026	8	6	—N/a	
Total	91	35	4	0

As of match played 13 October 2026. England score listed first, score column indicates score after each Stanway goal.

International goals by date, venue, opponent, score, result and competition
No.	Date	Venue	Opponent	Score	Result	Competition	Ref.
1	8 November 2018	BSFZ-Arena, Maria Enzersdorf, Austria	Austria	2–0	3–0	Friendly	
2	3 September 2019	Brann Stadion, Bergen, Norway	Norway	1–0	1–2	Friendly	
3	26 October 2021	Daugava Stadium, Riga, Latvia	Latvia	9–0	10–0	2023 FIFA Women's World Cup qualification	
4	30 November 2021	Keepmoat Stadium, Doncaster, England	Latvia	10–0	20–0	2023 FIFA Women's World Cup qualification	
5	8 April 2022	Toše Proeski Arena, Skopje, North Macedonia	North Macedonia	5–0	10–0	2023 FIFA Women's World Cup qualification	
6	8 April 2022	Toše Proeski Arena, Skopje, North Macedonia	North Macedonia	8–0	10–0	2023 FIFA Women's World Cup qualification	
7	12 April 2022	Windsor Park, Belfast, Northern Ireland	Northern Ireland	4–0	5–0	2023 FIFA Women's World Cup qualification	
8	12 April 2022	Windsor Park, Belfast, Northern Ireland	Northern Ireland	5–0	5–0	2023 FIFA Women's World Cup qualification	
9	30 June 2022	Letzigrund, Zürich, Switzerland	Switzerland	2–0	4–0	Friendly	
10	11 July 2022	Falmer Stadium, Brighton and Hove, England	Norway	1–0	8–0	UEFA Women's Euro 2022	
11	20 July 2022	Falmer Stadium, Brighton and Hove, England	Spain	2–1	2–1 (a.e.t.)	UEFA Women's Euro 2022	
12	6 September 2022	Bet365 Stadium, Stoke-on-Trent, England	Luxembourg	1–0	10–0	2023 FIFA Women's World Cup qualification	
13	6 September 2022	Bet365 Stadium, Stoke-on-Trent, England	Luxembourg	3–0	10–0	2023 FIFA Women's World Cup qualification	
14	7 October 2022	Wembley Stadium, London, England	United States	2–1	2–1	Friendly	
15	16 February 2023	Stadium MK, Milton Keynes, England	South Korea	1–0	4–0	2023 Arnold Clark Cup	
16	22 July 2023	Lang Park, Brisbane, Australia	Haiti	1–0	1–0	2023 FIFA Women's World Cup	
17	1 December 2023	Wembley Stadium, London, England	Netherlands	1–2	3–2	2023–24 UEFA Women's Nations League A	
18	4 June 2024	Stade Geoffroy-Guichard, Saint-Étienne, France	France	1–0	2–1	UEFA Women's Euro 2025 qualification	
19	12 July 2024	Carrow Road, Norwich, England	Republic of Ireland	2–0	2–1	UEFA Women's Euro 2025 qualification	
20	25 October 2024	Wembley Stadium, London, England	Germany	1–3	3–4	Friendly	
21	25 October 2024	Wembley Stadium, London, England	Germany	2–3	3–4	Friendly	
22	29 June 2025	King Power Stadium, Leicester, England	Jamaica	4–0	7–0	Friendly	
23	9 July 2025	Letzigrund, Zurich, Switzerland	Netherlands	2–0	4–0	UEFA Women's Euro 2025	
24	13 July 2025	Kybunpark, St. Gallen, Switzerland	Wales	1–0	6–1	UEFA Women's Euro 2025	
25	25 October 2025	City of Manchester Stadium, Manchester, England	Brazil	1–2	1–2	Friendly	
26	28 October 2025	Pride Park Stadium, Derby, England	Australia	3–0	3–0	Friendly	
27	29 November 2025	Wembley Stadium, London, England	China	4–0	8–0	Friendly	
28	29 November 2025	Wembley Stadium, London, England	China	5–0	8–0	Friendly	
29	29 November 2025	Wembley Stadium, London, England	China	6–0	8–0	Friendly	
30	3 March 2026	Mardan Sports Complex, Antalya, Turkey	Ukraine	3–1	6–1	2027 FIFA Women's World Cup qualification	
31	3 March 2026	Mardan Sports Complex, Antalya, Turkey	Ukraine	4–1	6–1	2027 FIFA Women's World Cup qualification	
32	7 March 2026	City Ground, Nottingham, England	Iceland	2–0	2–0	2027 FIFA Women's World Cup qualification	
33	9 June 2026	Hill Dickinson Stadium, Liverpool, England	Ukraine	2–0	3–0	2027 FIFA Women's World Cup qualification	
34	9 October 2026	Pankritio Stadium, Heraklion, Greece	Greece	1–0	3–1	2027 FIFA Women's World Cup qualification play-offs	
35	13 October 2026	King Power Stadium, Leicester, England	Greece	3–0	5–0	2027 FIFA Women's World Cup qualification play-offs	

== Honours ==
Manchester City

- FA Women's Super League: 2016
- Women's FA Cup: 2016–17, 2018–19, 2019–20
- FA Women's League Cup: 2016, 2018–19, 2021–22

Bayern Munich

- Frauen-Bundesliga: 2022–23, 2023–24, 2024–25, 2025–26
- DFB-Pokal Frauen: 2024–25, 2025–26
- DFB-Supercup Frauen: 2024, 2025

England Schoolgirls U15

- Bob Docherty Cup: 2014

England U17

- UEFA Women's Under-17 Championship third place: 2016

England U20

- FIFA U-20 Women's World Cup third place: 2018

England

- FIFA Women's World Cup runner-up: 2023
- UEFA Women's Championship: 2022, 2025
- Women's Finalissima: 2023
- SheBelieves Cup: 2019
- Arnold Clark Cup: 2022, 2023

Individual

- UEFA Women's Under-17 Championship Team of the Tournament: 2016
- FIFA U-20 Women's World Cup Silver Boot: 2018
- PFA Women's Young Player of the Year: 2018–19
- FA Women's Super League Goal of the Month: December 2021
- Freedom of the City of London (announced 1 August 2022)
- Women's Football Awards International Player of the Year: 2024
- Member of the Order of the British Empire (MBE) for services to association football: 2026 New Year Honours
