= List of Manchester City W.F.C. players =

This is a list of football (soccer) players who have played for Manchester City Women's F.C. It includes players who have played at least one match for the club (starting or as a substitute) in a competitive match since Manchester City Women were transferred to the FA WSL for the 2014 season.

== Player statistics ==
As of 20 January 2019

- Appearances and goals are for first-team competitive matches only, recorded from the point of the club playing their first game in the FA Women's Super League in 2014
- Current players are in bold
- Players are listed according to the date and minute of their first team debut for the club, ordered alphabetically where no other sorting is possible

Name	Nat.	Pos.	Years	FA WSL		FA Cup		League Cup		Champions League		Total	
Name	Nat.	Pos.	Years	Apps	Goals	Apps	Goals	Apps	Goals	Apps	Goals	Apps	Goals
Izzy Christiansen	(England)	MF	2014–2018	59	18	13	2	23	8	10	4	**105**	**33**
Toni Duggan	(England)	FW	2014–2017	40	19	10	5	14	1	4	0	**68**	**33**
Betsy Hassett	(New Zealand)	MF	2014	13	0	2	0	6	0	0	0	**21**	**0**
Jess Holbrook	(England)	MF	2014	5	0	1	0	2	0	0	0	**8**	**0**
Steph Houghton	(England)	DF	2014–2024	138	17	19	2	51	2	25	1	**233**	**22**
Krystle Johnston	(England)	FW	2008–2016	25	1	3	0	12	3	0	0	**40**	**4**
Emma Lipman	(England)	DF	2013–2015	15	0	3	0	10	0	0	0	**28**	**0**
Stephanie Marsh	(England)	DF	2013–2014	2	0	2	0	1	0	0	0	**5**	**0**
Chelsea Nightingale	(England)	DF	2014–2015	13	0	3	0	3	0	0	0	**19**	**0**
Jill Scott	(England)	MF	2014–2022	74	18	12	2	23	2	14	2	**123**	**24**
Andrea Worrall	(Wales)	GK	2013–2014	2	0	2	0	0	0	0	0	**4**	**0**
Natasha Flint	(England)	MF	2014–2015	19	2	4	0	11	1	0	0	**34**	**3**
Nicola Harding	(England)	MF	2014	5	0	1	0	4	0	0	0	**10**	**0**
Lynda Shepherd	(Northern Ireland)	MF	2014	2	0	1	0	2	0	0	0	**5**	**0**
Karen Bardsley	(England)	GK	2014–2022	49	0	5	0	21	0	9	0	**85**	**0**
Abbie McManus	(England)	DF	2014–2019	55	2	12	0	23	1	12	0	**102**	**3**
Danni Young	(England)	DF	2014	6	0	0	0	3	0	0	0	**9**	**0**
Kathleen Radtke	(Germany)	DF	2014–2016	16	0	3	0	8	0	0	0	**27**	**0**
Georgia Brougham	(England)	MF	2014–2015	4	0	0	0	4	0	0	0	**8**	**0**
Alexandra Brooks	(England)	GK	2014–2018	4	0	2	0	1	0	0	0	**7**	**0**
Keira Walsh	(England)	MF	2014–2022	55	0	5	0	21	0	14	0	**90**	**0**
Emma Kete	(New Zealand)	FW	2014–2015	4	0	0	0	1	0	0	0	**5**	**0**
Jen Beattie	(Scotland)	DF	2015–2019	60	5	7	0	18	4	11	3	**96**	**12**
Nikita Parris	(England)	FW	2015–2019	61	30	14	6	17	11	13	4	**105**	**51**
Demi Stokes	(England)	DF	2015–2024	113	4	24	0	27	0	26	0	**190**	**6**
Sarah Wiltshire	(England)	FW	2015	1	0	1	0	0	0	0	0	**2**	**0**
Natasha Harding	(Wales)	MF	2015	10	1	2	0	1	0	0	0	**13**	**1**
Lucy Bronze	(England)	DF	2015–2022	31	5	9	2	8	1	5	3	**53**	**11**
Daphne Corboz	(United States)	MF	2015–2016	20	3	3	0	7	1	1	0	**31**	**4**
Kosovare Asllani	(Sweden)	FW	2016–2017	14	2	4	0	2	0	5	1	**25**	**3**
Jane Ross	(Scotland)	FW	2015–2018	30	13	8	4	9	4	9	4	**56**	**25**
Georgia Stanway	(England)	FW	2015–2022	41	21	9	2	12	7	8	2	**70**	**32**
Marie Hourihan	(Republic of Ireland)	GK	2016–2018	2	0	2	0	6	0	0	0	**10**	**0**
Alethea Paul	(England)	MF	2016–2018	0	0	1	0	0	0	0	0	**1**	**0**
Zoe Tynan	(England)	MF	2016	0	0	1	0	0	0	0	0	**1**	**0**
Amelia Kemp	(England)	DF	2016	0	0	1	0	0	0	0	0	**1**	**0**
Tessel Middag	(Netherlands)	MF	2016–2018	10	0	2	0	3	1	5	0	**20**	**1**
Megan Campbell	(Republic of Ireland)	DF	2016–2021	12	1	1	0	3	0	4	0	**20**	**1**
Ella Toone	(England)	FW	2016–2018	3	0	1	1	4	0	0	0	**8**	**1**
Ellie Roebuck	(England)	GK	2016–2024	93	0	9	0	10	0	18	0	**131**	**0**
Melissa Lawley	(England)	MF	2016–2019	16	2	7	1	8	0	10	1	**41**	**4**
Carli Lloyd	(United States)	MF	2017	3	0	4	1	0	0	3	2	**10**	**3**
Claire Emslie	(Scotland)	FW	2017–2019	27	7	4	2	13	5	9	1	**53**	**15**
**Esme Morgan**	(England)	DF	2017–	10	0	0	0	6	0	0	0	**16**	**0**
Pauline Bremer	(Germany)	FW	2017–2020	3	1	0	0	3	0	1	0	**7**	**1**
Mie Jans	(Denmark)	DF	2017–2019	4	0	3	0	3	0	3	0	**13**	**0**
**Jess Park**	(England)	MF	2017–	2	0	0	0	4	2	0	0	**6**	**2**
Nadia Nadim	(Denmark)	FW	2018	15	4	4	1	5	3	1	0	**27**	**8**
Julia Spetsmark	(Sweden)	MF	2018	3	0	0	0	1	0	0	0	**4**	**0**
Gemma Bonner	(England)	DF	2018–2021	12	0	0	0	6	1	1	1	**19**	**2**
Caroline Weir	(Scotland)	FW	2018–2022	12	5	0	0	4	2	1	0	**17**	**7**
Tessa Wullaert	(Belgium)	FW	2018–2020	12	2	0	0	5	2	1	0	**18**	**4**
Janine Beckie	(Canada)	FW	2018–2022	5	0	0	0	4	7	0	0	**9**	**7**
**Lauren Hemp**	(England)	FW	2018–	4	1	0	0	4	3	0	0	**8**	**4**
Fran Stenson	(England)	GK	2018–2019	0	0	0	0	1	0	0	0	**1**	**0**
Emma Bissell	(England)	FW	2018–2020	0	0	0	0	1	0	0	0	**1**	**0**
Matilde Fidalgo	(Portugal)	DF	2019–2020										
Lee Geum-min	(South Korea)	FW	2019–2021										
Aoife Mannion	(England)	DF	2019–2021										
Tyler Toland	(Republic of Ireland)	MF	2019–2021										
Karima Benameur Taieb	(France)	GK	2019–2022										
Ellen White	(England)	FW	2019–2022										
**Laura Coombs**	(England)	MF	2019–										
**Alex Greenwood**	(England)	DF	2020–										
**Chloe Kelly**	(England)	FW	2020–(on loan)	75	21	11	4	10	4	13	2	109	31
Sam Mewis	(United States)	MF	2020–2021										
Rose Lavelle	(United States)	MF	2020–2021										
Abby Dahlkemper	(United States)	DF	2021										
Alicia Window	(England)	DF	–2021										
Millie Davies	(England)	MF	–2021										
**Filippa Angeldahl**	(Sweden)	MF	2021–										
**Alanna Kennedy**	(Australia)	DF	2021–										
**Vicky Losada**	(Spain)	MF	2021–										
**Ruby Mace**	(England)	MF	2021–										
**Hayley Raso**	(Australia)	FW	2021–										
**Khadija Shaw**	(Jamaica)	FW	2021–	71	62	13	15	12	7	9	7	105	91
**Deyna Castellanos**	(Venezuela)	FW	2022–										
**Julie Blakstad**	(Norway)	MF	2022–										
**Kerstin Casparij**	(Netherlands)	DF	2022–										
**Khiara Keating**	(England)	GK	2022–										
**Laia Aleixandri**	(Spain)	DF	2022–										
**Leila Ouahabi**	(Spain)	DF	2022–										
**Mary Fowler**	(Australia)	FW	2022–										
**Sandy MacIver**	(England)	GK	2022–										
**Yui Hasegawa**	(Japan)	MF	2022–										
Ginny Lackey	(England)	FW	2022										
**Annie Hutchings**	(England)	MF	2022–										
**Jemima Dahou**	(England)	MF	2022–										
**Lois Marley-Paraskevas**	(England)	FW	2022–										
**Gracie Prior**	(England)	DF	2022–										
**Emma Siddall**	(England)	MF	2022–										

== External sources ==
- Soccerway
- Manchester City official website - Match reports
- BBC Sport - FA WSL match reports
