= Lucy Bronze =

English footballer (born 1991)

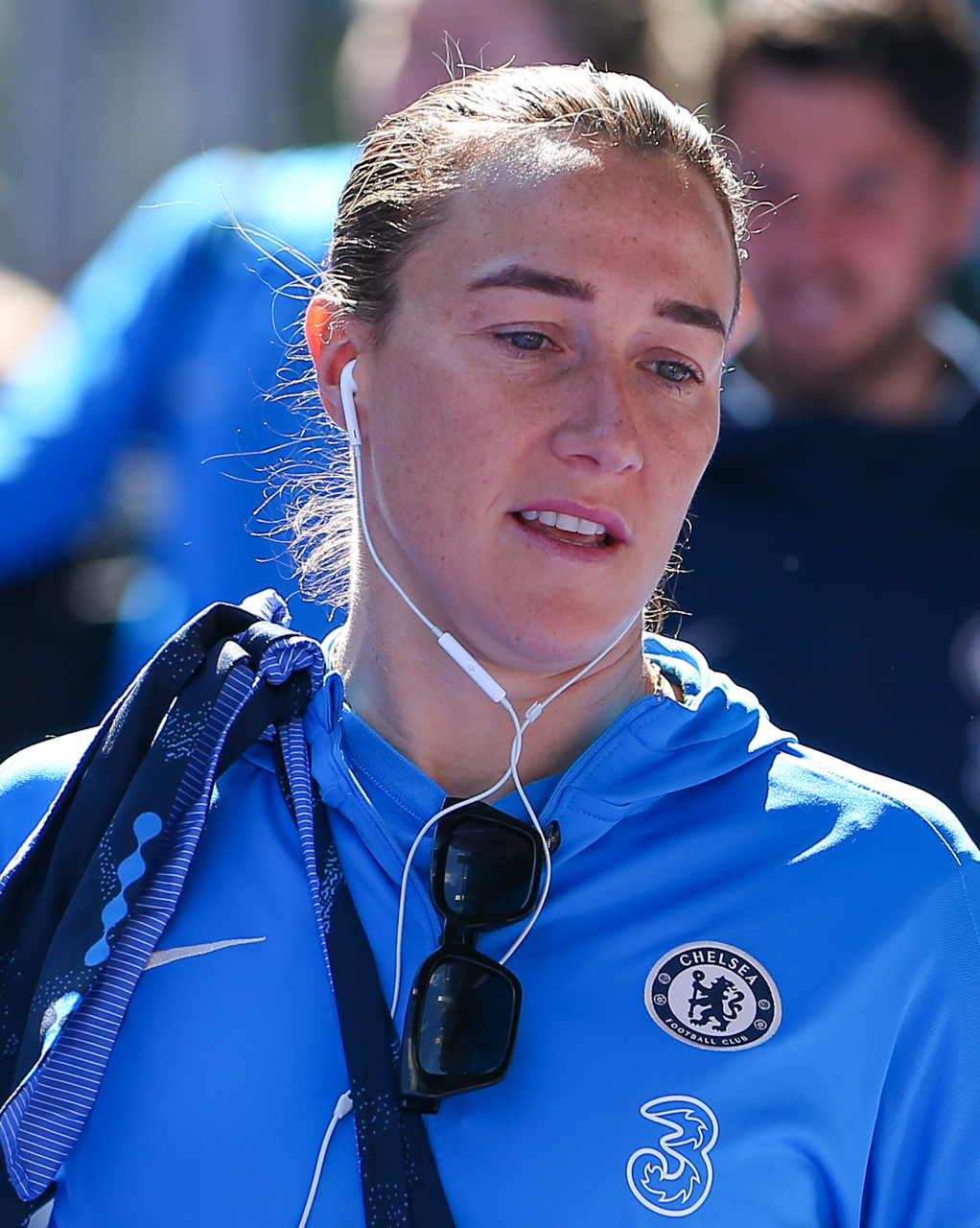
- Bronze in 2025

Personal information
- Full name: Lucia Roberta Tough Bronze
- Date of birth: 28 October 1991 (age 35)
- Place of birth: Berwick-upon-Tweed, England
- Height: 5 ft 8 in (1.72 m)
- Positions: Right-back; right wing-back

Team information
- Current team: Chelsea
- Number: 22

Youth career
- 2002–2007: Sunderland
- 2004–2007: Blyth Town

College career
Years	Team	Apps	(Gls)
2009	North Carolina Tar Heels	24	(3)
- Leeds Met

Senior career*
Years	Team	Apps	(Gls)
2007–2010	Sunderland	25	(5)
2010–2012	Everton	20	(2)
2012–2014	Liverpool	28	(3)
2014–2017	Manchester City	34	(5)
2017–2020	Lyon	50	(3)
2020–2022	Manchester City	31	(2)
2022–2024	Barcelona	41	(4)
2024–	Chelsea	42	(3)

International career^{‡}
2007–2008	England U17	6	(0)
2009–2010	England U19	20	(0)
2010	England U20	3	(0)
2010–2013	England U23	5	(0)
2013–	England	148	(22)
2021	Great Britain	4	(0)
Medal record
Women's football
Representing England
UEFA Women's Championship
Winner	2022 England
Winner	2025 Switzerland
UEFA–CONMEBOL Finalissima
Winner	2023 England
FIFA Women's World Cup
Runner-up	2023 Australia and New Zealand
Bronze medal – third place	2015 Canada
- * Club domestic league appearances and goals as of 16:05, 21 November 2026 (UTC) ‡ National team caps and goals as of 10:30, 6 June 2026 (UTC)

Lucia Roberta Tough Bronze (Note: Known as Lucy Bronze, until at least 2011 she was known professionally as Lucia Bronze both at club and internationally. At North Carolina in 2009 she was known as both Lucia Bronze and Lucy Bronze. She is sometimes referred to as Luzy Bronze by FIFA and in the media. In Portuguese media, her first name is written as Lúcia.) MBE (born 28 October 1991) is an English professional footballer who plays as a right-back for Women's Super League club Chelsea and the England women's national team. She has previously played for Sunderland, Everton, Liverpool, Lyon, Manchester City and Barcelona, as well as North Carolina at college level in the United States and Great Britain at the Olympics. Bronze has won a total of five Champions League titles, three with Lyon and two with Barcelona; four Women's Super League titles, with Liverpool, Manchester City and Chelsea; and both the Euro 2022 and the Euro 2025 with England.

Bronze represented England from under-17 level and has been part of the senior national team at every major tournament since the Euro 2013, having first captained them in 2018. She won the Silver Ball at the 2019 World Cup in France, helping England to a fourth-place finish. Bronze was named to the All-Star Squads at the 2015 World Cup in Canada, in which England finished third, as well as the Euro 2017 in the Netherlands and the 2019 World Cup. She has won the PFA Women's Players' Player of the Year award twice – in 2014 and 2017.

In 2018 and 2020, Bronze was named BBC Women's Footballer of the Year. In 2019, she became the first English footballer to win the UEFA Women's Player of the Year Award, and won the inaugural Globe Soccer Award for the Women's Best Player. Bronze was named The Best FIFA Women's Player in December 2020. She is regarded as one of the best players in women's football, with her then coach Phil Neville claiming she was undoubtedly the "best player in the world". Men in Blazers listed her as one of the 100 best footballers (men and women) of all time.

== Early years and education ==
Lucia Roberta Tough Bronze was born on 28 October 1991 in Berwick-upon-Tweed to a Portuguese father, Joaquim Bronze, and an English mother, Diane née Tough. The family lived in Faro, Portugal, and only moved back to Lindisfarne (Holy Island, off the coast of the north of England) the week Bronze was born; she was almost born on the island, but her mother did not want a potential helicopter transfer to hospital. She is British-Portuguese and has an older brother and a younger sister. The siblings, in line with Portuguese naming customs, all took both their parents' surnames; born in England, Bronze has her maternal surname Tough as a middle name in such contexts. They were raised bilingual, though Bronze has said she is not very comfortable when speaking Portuguese. She was very shy when young and would not speak much in general.

As a child, she began playing football with her brother and his friends, first playing in Faro. She grew up around the North East, living on Lindisfarne (where her maternal family is from and were caretakers of Lindisfarne Castle), in Belford, and in Alnwick. Having played football for Belford, Bronze joined Alnwick Town when young and stayed with them to the under-11 level, but Football Association (FA) rules prevented her from continuing with the boys' team when she turned twelve. In the Alnwick juniors squad, Bronze was the best player on the team, picking up six "man of the match" awards from eight games; the manager was so intent for her to continue playing when she turned twelve that he helped open a discrimination case against the FA in the hopes they would allow an exception. They did not, but did set a target to support more girls' football teams in rural Northern areas as an alternative solution. After winning the UEFA Women's Euro 2022, a plaque honouring Bronze as part of the "Where Greatness Is Made" campaign was installed at the Alnwick Town ground.

Bronze attended the Duchess's Community High School in Alnwick with middle-distance runner Laura Weightman and future England teammate Lucy Staniforth. Here, she played as a midfielder and was the captain in football, as well as taking part in numerous other team sports, including captaining the tennis and hockey teams (being county champion at least once in all three); her mother encouraged Bronze to pursue tennis rather than football, but began supporting her ambitions after she was told by the FA she could no longer play for a boys' team. Though preferring team sports, Bronze took part in many others, including reaching the national finals in cross country and pentathlon, and at one point aiming to go to the Olympic Games as an 800 metres runner. Her mother is a maths teacher and, keen on mathematics herself, Bronze received a bronze award in the United Kingdom Mathematics Trust Challenge.

When she was seventeen, in 2009, Bronze finished sixth form a year early and moved to North Carolina to study at the University of North Carolina at Chapel Hill and play for the Tar Heels women's soccer team at college level. She returned to England after a year, transferring to Leeds Metropolitan University to continue her sports science degree, graduating in 2013. She wrote her dissertation on ACL injuries in women's sport. At Leeds, she worked at a bar and at Domino's Pizza.

== Club career ==
=== Sunderland ===
==== Youth, 2002–07 ====
No longer able to play for Alnwick, Bronze began attending summer training camps in Chapel Hill, North Carolina, something her mother had discovered when looking for opportunities for her to continue to play football, and playing for Sunderland, first at under-12 academy level, from 2002. Though the nearest girls' team to Alnwick, it was still several hours away, and Bronze has said between school and training she had no time for anything else. The travel was draining and Bronze was shy going to Sunderland, so when she was old enough (the option of playing above her age group was also referred to the FA and denied), she played for Blyth Town WFC, a closer side that had an under-14 girls' team in the Northern Girls Tyne Tees League. She continued training with Sunderland, though less regularly, including at under-15 level. She was the captain of Sunderland's under-16 team, but still played for Blyth Town at this age.

At Blyth Town, Bronze started out as a striker, with Staniforth saying that Bronze was a special player, that "all I'd have to do was kick the ball over to her and she would bully everyone out the way and stick it in the goal." Bronze then began playing at Sunderland as a midfielder, but was pushed into the back line when Jordan Nobbs, a natural 'number 8', joined the team. She then played as a left-back in the youth squads, basing her game on idol David Beckham.

==== Senior, 2007–10 ====
Bronze joined the Sunderland senior team when she turned 16 in 2007. In 2007–08, Bronze was named Manager's Player of the Year as Sunderland finished third in the FA Women's Premier League Northern Division. The next season she helped them win the Northern Division and gain promotion to the National Division. Bronze also started in the 2009 FA Women's Cup Final, being awarded the Player of the Match award in Sunderland's 1–2 loss to Arsenal. After a semester in the United States, Bronze returned to England in December 2009 and was included on the Sunderland squad for initial matches in the National Division.

=== College: North Carolina Tar Heels, 2009 ===
Having been turned down for a Loughborough University programme that accepted girls to play football and study as a teenager, Bronze turned to North Carolina. She had won a scholarship to the University of North Carolina at Chapel Hill from coach Anson Dorrance after impressing him during several soccer camps.

In the summer of 2009, Bronze moved to Chapel Hill, studying and playing for their soccer team, the Tar Heels, the most successful Division 1 team in the country; during her time there, Bronze said that she did not feel nervous to live up to such a legacy or play in the college championships as she did not really understand it. Originally recruited to play as a true freshman defender and told she would not get many minutes behind more senior players, though with the potential to be a starter in her second year, the season-ending injury suffered by Nikki Washington saw Bronze featured prominently in the midfield for the team. The youngest player on the team, Bronze volunteered to pair-up against senior Tobin Heath in competitive training.

As a starter, Bronze won the ACC tournament, and, in December 2009, became the first British player to win an NCAA Cup after having assisted for the crucial goal in the semi-final and making an important clearance in the final. All-American honours as a midfielder followed for Bronze, who scored three goals and provided four assists in 24 games, with Dorrance saying that she brought a level of polish and savviness from English football to the team and the college writing that she "dominated" in the NCAA tournament for them.

Bronze missed a match in September to train with the youth squad in England, and returned for international training again in December 2009. By this point she had been told by England that if she continued to play in the United States they would not consider her for the national team. During England training, she injured her knee, which then became infected, and she spent much of the next year in a leg brace. She transferred to Leeds Metropolitan University in 2010. She became a "key member" of the Leeds Met university women's football team, which won the BUCS North Premier Division in the 2010–11 year. Some of her North Carolina college teammates were already successful internationals, and Bronze has credited witnessing the "huge spectacle" of women's football in the United States, as well as experiencing the mentality in training there, with inspiring her career.

=== Everton, 2010–12 ===
Mo Marley, who coached Bronze in England youth squads, offered Bronze a spot on the Everton squad Marley was coaching in the summer of 2010; with Everton, Bronze could play in the newly established Women's Super League, which Sunderland would not be joining. She was named in Everton's UEFA Women's Champions League squad in September 2010 and debuted for the club in a 0–0 draw against MTK in Hungary.

For all of her time at Everton, Bronze was recovering from her knee injury; she did not play often, and continued to predominantly work at Domino's. She played in six matches for Everton during the 2011 FA WSL season, starting five of these on the bench. Everton finished in third place in the league, with a 7–4–3 record. During the 2012 FA WSL, she started ten of the eleven matches she played. She scored her first Everton goal during a 2–0 win against Liverpool. Everton also finished this season in third place with a 7–4–3 record. Bronze spent the two years following her knee surgeries using what she learnt in her sports science degree to create her own rehabilitation plan. Pundit and former player Alex Scott, who played in the same position as Bronze, later said that the years Bronze spent determined to overcome her injury were instrumental in her developing the physical and mental strength to reach the level she has.

=== Liverpool ===
==== 2013 ====
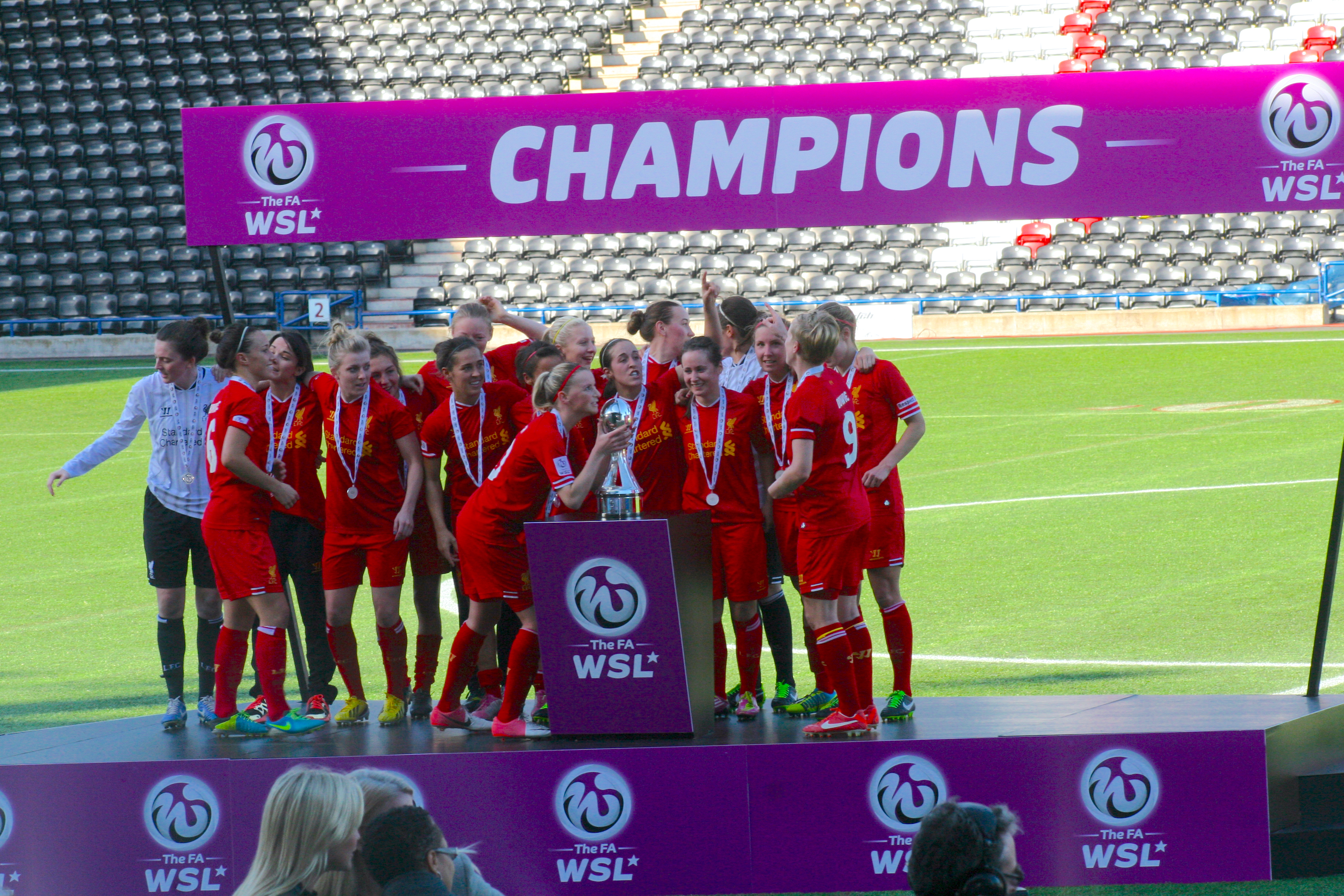
Bronze (second left; number 6) with Liverpool winning the 2013 FA WSL Championship

In November 2012, Bronze left Everton to sign for local rivals Liverpool, following Natasha Dowie and Fara Williams who had made the same move days earlier, saying that her decision was driven by the medical and training support she would receive; Liverpool became England's first full-time women's club for the 2013 season, attracting these players.

Bronze was part of the Liverpool side that won the FA WSL in 2013 and again in 2014. During the 2013 FA WSL season, she was a starting defender in thirteen of the fourteen matches she played, and scored a goal during the team's 4–1 win over Birmingham City. Liverpool finished in first place and suffered only two defeats.

==== 2014 ====
During the 2014 FA WSL, Bronze started all matches for Liverpool, helping the team to another league championship and a 7–5–2 record; a victory against Bristol Academy on the last day, including a goal from Bronze, saw Liverpool jump from third to first in the league.

In 2014, Bronze was awarded the PFA Women's Players' Player of the Year. Following her second league title, she departed Liverpool to sign for Manchester City.

=== First stint with Manchester City ===
==== 2015 ====
Bronze signed for Manchester City in November 2014, following the team's successful opening season, with Bronze saying that what the club offered its female players, in terms of resource equity with the men's team, was "unheard of really". The move, with Bronze to start playing in the team's 2015 season, "sent shockwaves through women's football"; though she had been successful with title-holding Liverpool, Bronze again moved because her team was offering more support to its female players. After four matches with City, Bronze had another knee operation.

In her first year at Manchester City, Bronze scored two goals from the full-back position, helping them to second place in the league and qualification for the UEFA Women's Champions League for the first time.

==== 2016 ====
In 2016, her second season in Manchester, she scored two league goals as City went unbeaten for the entire season. She contributed to an outstanding record which saw Manchester City only concede four league goals. She also helped Manchester City to their second FA WSL Cup win in three years, scoring the winning goal in the 105th minute of the final. Bronze was also named FA WSL 1 Players' Player of the Year. She played a part in both the home and away leg of Manchester City's first ever Champions League games, scoring two and assisting two in a 6–0 aggregate win over Russian champions Zvezda Perm.

==== 2017 ====
She ended competition with eight appearances, as Manchester City reached the semi-finals of the 2016–17 edition of the UEFA Women's Champions League, with their title hopes ended in late April when they lost to Olympique Lyonnais (Lyon) 3–2 on aggregate. On 23 April 2017, Bronze was named PFA Women's Players' Player of the Year for second time, and was selected in the PFA WSL Team of the Year and Women's Champions League Squad of the Season. In the 2017 Women's FA Cup Final in May, Bronze gave a strong display, scoring the opening goal and providing the assist for the second, with City winning 4–1 and, as a result, becoming the first team to hold all three England domestic trophies.

Later that year, she was shortlisted for the UEFA Women's Player of the Year Award and The Best FIFA Women's Player Award, but finished eighth and ninth respectively in the voting. At the end of 2016, Bronze had been ranked tenth on The 100 Best Female Footballers in the World list by The Offside Rule/The Guardian, placing fifth in 2017.

While her first three years with Manchester City were a great success that saw her gain wider recognition, they "were quite erratic" and Breaking The Lines wrote that "she didn't reach the same heights as she did with Liverpool".

=== Lyon ===
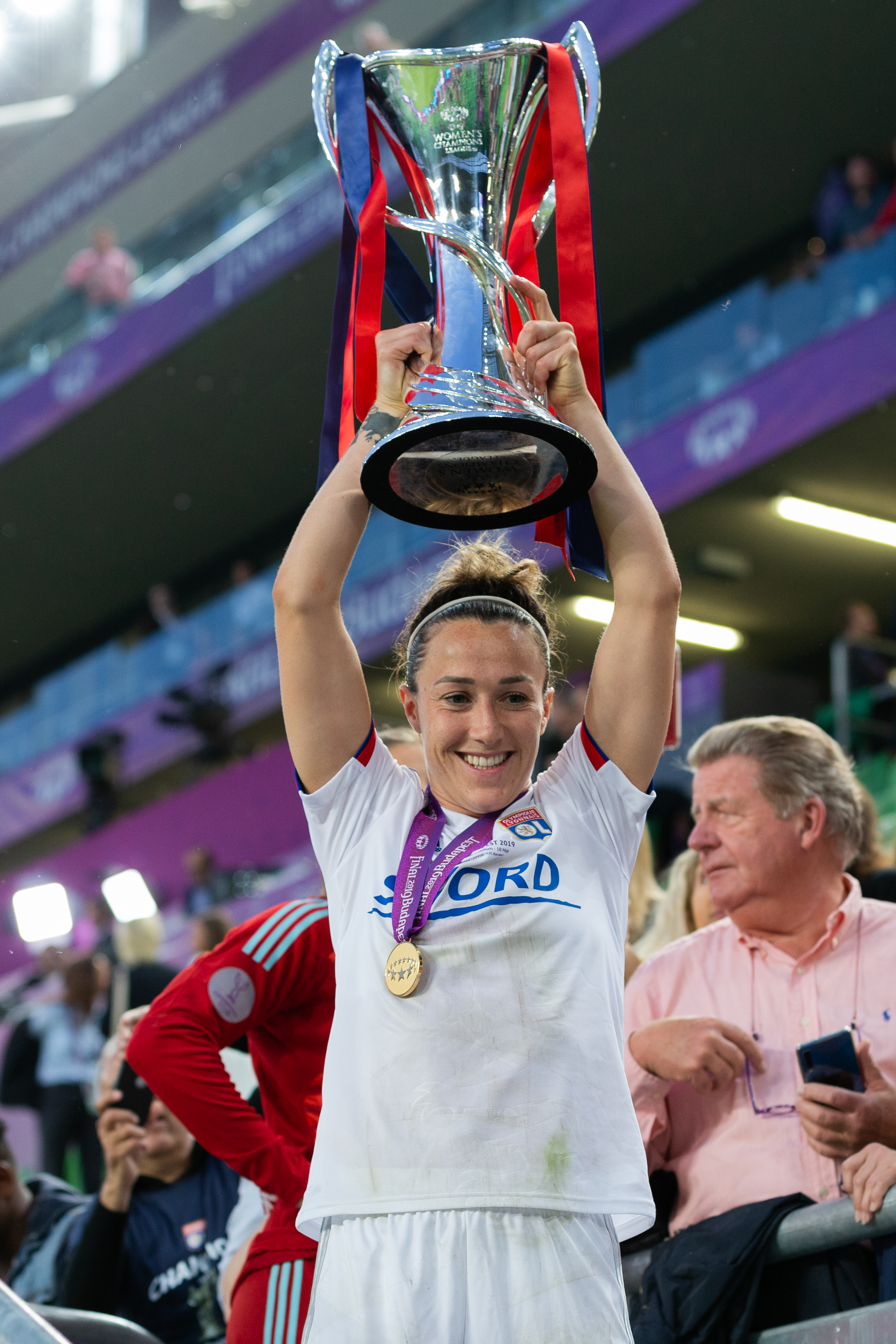
Bronze celebrating winning the UEFA Champions League with Lyon in 2019

==== 2017–18 ====
In August 2017, Bronze signed a three-year contract with Lyon. In the 2017–18 season of the UEFA Women's Champions League, Bronze made eight appearances, scoring two goals as Lyon reached the final, including a winning goal against Manchester City that was nominated for UEFA Goal of the Season. She featured in the final match of the UEFA Women's Champions League and helped Lyon win the competition. In the Division 1 Féminine league, Bronze made nineteen appearances, scoring two goals, as Lyon captured its twelfth straight league title. She was named in the Team of the Year for the D1 Feminine, as well as in the Women's Champions League Squad of the Season. In the Coupe de France, Lyon were unable to defend their Coupe de France title, losing to Paris Saint-German in the final. At the end of 2018, Bronze was shortlisted for the premiere women's football awards: the inaugural Ballon d'Or Féminin award, the UEFA Women's Player of the Year Award, and The Best FIFA Women's Player Award, finishing sixth, fifth and sixth respectively. She was number four on The Guardian's 2018 100 Best Female Footballers list. She was also shortlisted for the FWA Women's Footballer of the Year Award.

==== 2018–19 ====
During the 2018–19 season, Bronze made 29 appearances for Lyon in all competitions, scoring two goals on her way to a second Division 1 Féminine league title; she also helped Lyon to reclaim the Coupe de France Féminine title and win a second consecutive UEFA Women's Champions League trophy. In the International Champions Cup, Lyon defeated the title holders North Carolina Courage, with Bronze helping to deliver the winning goal.

At the end of 2019, for her performances in the season, Bronze finished as runner-up for the Women's Ballon d'Or, was named UEFA Women's Player of the Year Award and finished third in the voting for The Best FIFA Women's Player Award. The Guardian ranked her second on the 100 best list.

==== 2019–20 ====
Bronze helped Lyon win Trophée des Championnes in 2019 – a first historic new trophy against Paris Saint-Germain. At the end of the season, Bronze confirmed that she would be leaving Lyon, following the expiration of her contract. She had signed a short extension to see out the end of the Champions League, which they again won. She won nine trophies in three seasons with the club. In December 2020, having won a treble in her last season with Lyon, she won The Best FIFA Women's Player Award, becoming the first defender and the first English footballer to do so.

=== Return to Manchester City ===
==== 2020–21 ====
On 8 September 2020, Bronze rejoined Manchester City on a two-year deal, following the conclusion of her contract with Lyon and her trophy-laden three-year spell there. Her new start at the club saw her beset with injury, but she recovered to have an impact later in the 2020–21 season. At the end of 2020, she placed third on the 100 best list produced by Offside Rule and The Guardian, and in March 2021 had contributed enough at City to still place fifth on the ESPN ranking of the top 50 women's players. At the end of this month, she made an impressive goal-line clearance to help City to a 2–1 win over Barcelona in the Champions League quarter-finals, though City lost on aggregate.

==== 2021–22 ====
She had another knee operation before the start of the 2021–22 season, restricting her play until the new year; at the end of 2021, she came in at 34th on the 100 best list, her first time outside the top 10 since the list began. In 2022, she won the League Cup with Manchester City, and had an episode of FIFA's documentary series Icons about her. After leaving City again over the summer of 2022, Bronze said that in her last year with the club she had not been completely happy or confident. The Guardian reported around the time that while Bronze and City manager Gareth Taylor did not mention it in public, there were tensions between them about Bronze's role in the City team. Bronze had said she would leave City at the end of her contract in 2022; with indications she would leave the WSL again, in May she was linked with potential moves to the National Women's Soccer League in the United States and, with Keira Walsh, to Spain; the Spanish media suggested that the pair would join Real Madrid as another City player, Caroline Weir, had just signed for the club.

In her second stint with City, Bronze was sometimes used as a central midfielder alongside Walsh during attacking play, offering more cover to allow the other midfielders to play as 'free 8' central attacking midfielders, with Bronze also taking build-up play duties, increasing her passing and attacking stats.

=== Barcelona ===
==== 2022–23 ====
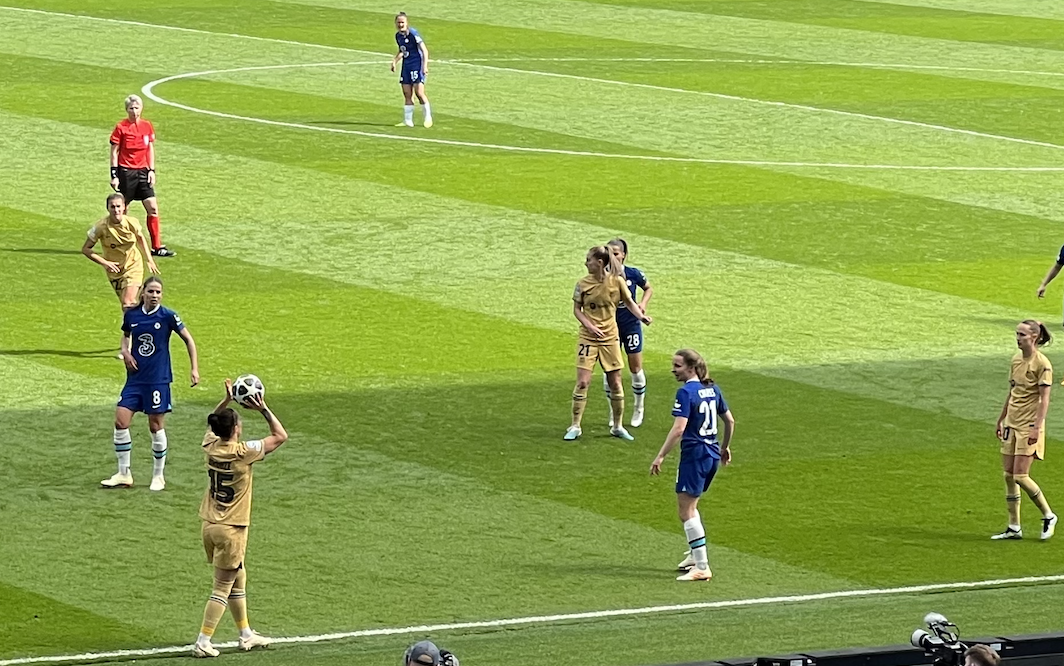
Bronze taking a throw-in for Barcelona in 2023

In June 2022, Bronze agreed to join Barcelona after her contract with Manchester City expired; Bronze said that she prefers playing abroad and wanted to take the opportunity to play for a club as renowned as Barcelona, as well as to be challenged there and help it "become another historical great in Europe" as she had experienced with Lyon. In August 2022, Barcelona announced that they would register Bronze as a Portuguese national, due to Spanish footballing bodies and the Royal Spanish Football Federation (RFEF) having not agreed, shortly before the season began, how many non-EU citizens each team could register and so preventing new non-EU players from being registered until this was resolved. Spanish media reported heavily on the uncertainty, with Bronze at the time said to be "bemused by the fuss".

While preferring to play outside of England, Bronze noted that the intensity and intelligence of the training at Barcelona was "an extra level up" from her years with Lyon. She was encouraged to be fluid in her position as a right back from the pre-season and, in their first league game, moved into the midfield in the 60th minute to make plays with England teammate and fellow new transfer Keira Walsh. She also felt that, besides the intensity, adapting to training at Barcelona was harder than at Lyon as the team's core were all Spanish and had been playing together for many years, thus requiring more off-pitch adaptation.

Bronze scored her first goal for Barcelona in an Otro Clásico match against Atlético Madrid on 27 November 2022, with a diving header for Barcelona's third of the game. Her second goal, in the very next game, was an 89th-minute match-winner, taking Barcelona ahead of Real Sociedad for the first time in the game to preserve their winning run. Earlier in the month, Bronze had been rested to prevent damage when experiencing a flare-up of her knee injury after a match against Real Madrid. Having been started by the team in all the important games, Bronze won her first title with them on 22 January 2023, providing an assist in the final of the 2022–23 Supercopa de España, helping the team to a 3–0 win. On 22 April 2023, facing Chelsea in the Champions League, Bronze sustained a knee injury and had to be taken off; on 25 April she had surgery, and was predicted to be unavailable for two to six weeks. On 30 April, Barcelona won the league at home with four matches to play and an all-wins record.

==== 2023–24 ====
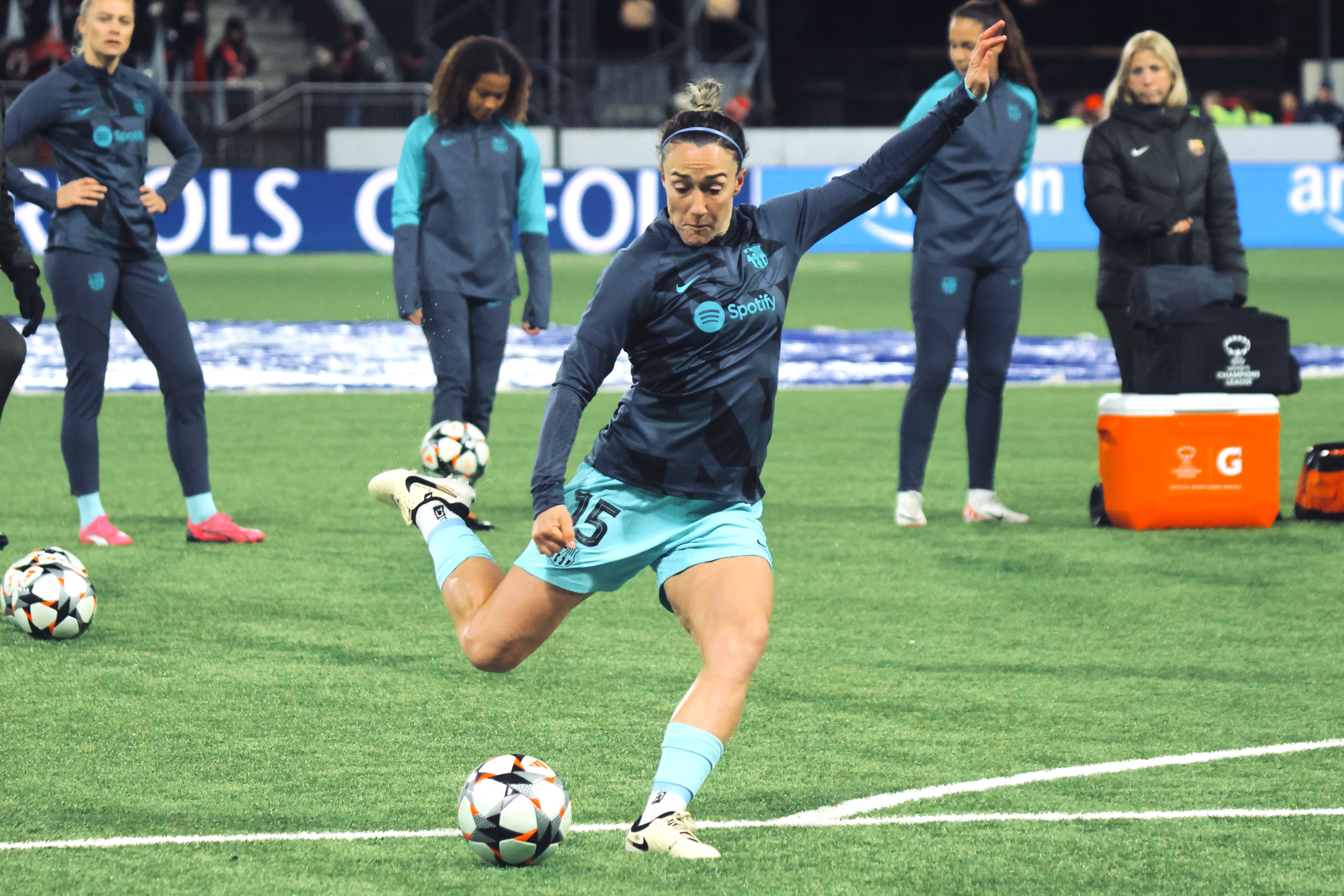
Bronze with Barcelona in March 2024

Barcelona signed their youth product Ona Batlle, a wing-back similar in play to Bronze, ahead of the 2023–24 season. Batlle started the season playing mostly on the left, due to injury to Fridolina Rolfö; Batlle was expected to take over as starting right back when Rolfö recovered, but Bronze retained her position and was key in the 2023–24 UEFA Women's Champions League, particularly the semi-finals and final that they won. Her experience was considered particularly important in Barcelona retaining the Champions League and winning all four titles in a perfect season. In achieving this, Bronze became the first English player to win five European cups.

Her contract expired on 30 June 2024, with confirmation of her departure announced a few days earlier.

=== Chelsea ===
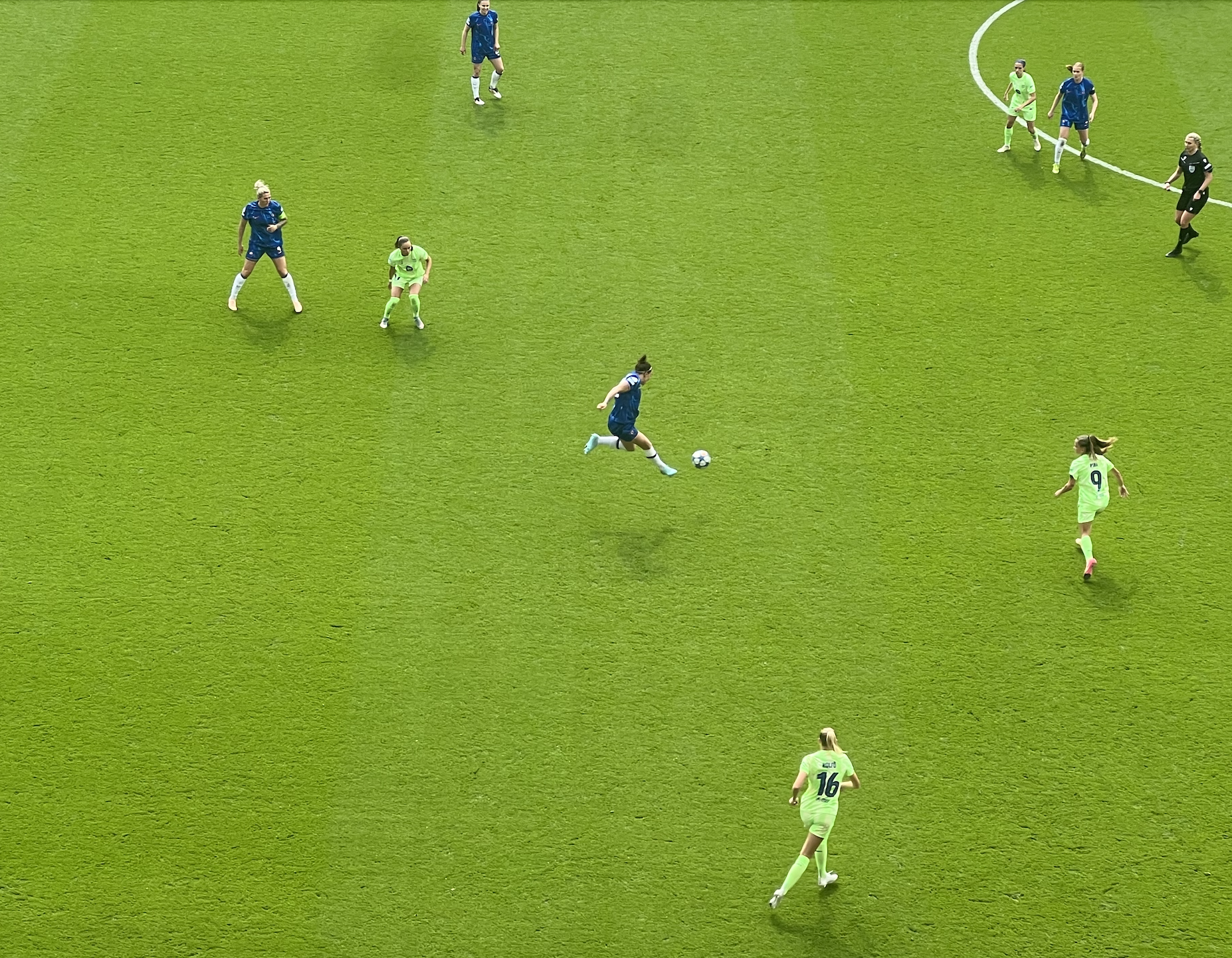
Bronze (centre) jumping to control the ball in a Champions League match against Barcelona in 2025

On 17 July 2024, it was announced that Bronze had signed a two-year contract with Chelsea, with Bronze saying she wanted to win the Champions League with an English team. She scored her first goal for the club during a 7–0 away win against Crystal Palace on 27 September 2024. On 30 April 2025, Bronze scored the only goal of the match in a 1–0 away win against Manchester United, a result which saw Chelsea win their sixth consecutive and eighth overall WSL title. On 12 October 2025, Bronze made her return from a fractured tibia injury which she had nursed through the 2025 Euros, coming on as a substitute in a 1–0 win at home against Tottenham. She was part of the Chelsea squad which the 2025–26 Women's League Cup following a 2–0 victory over Manchester United on 15 March 2026, marking Bronze's 24th trophy in club football. Later that year, on 2 July, she extended her contract with the club for another year.

==== 2026-27 ====
On 4 September 2026, Bronze was named as Chelsea’s vice-captain, along with Nathalie Björn.

== International career ==
=== England ===
==== 2007–2013: Youth squads ====
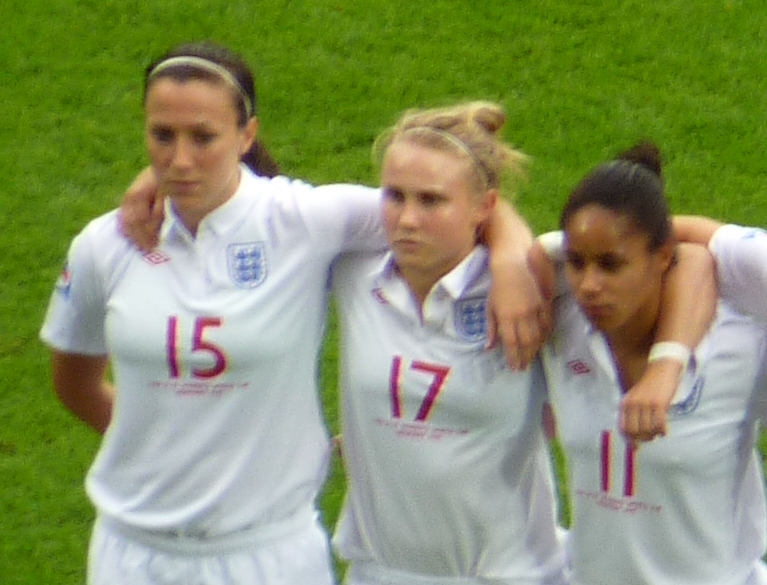
Bronze (left) with Izzy Christiansen (centre) and Demi Stokes during the 2010 FIFA U-20 Women's World Cup

Bronze aspired to play for England but noticed scouts never went up to Sunderland to watch her matches; at a summer camp in North Carolina, Dorrance promised to help her, and used his contacts at Arsenal to have someone go to watch her play, after which she was taken into the England youth system. Bronze was called into the England under-17 squad in March 2007, aged fifteen, while she was playing for Blyth Town. She was part of successful England youth teams at all age groups. The only football shirt Bronze has framed is her England under-17 shirt which still has Ribena stains on it.

Called up to the squad for the under-17 Euro qualifiers in 2007, she was also part of the team that came fourth in the finals of the 2008 UEFA Women's Under-17 Championship, the first instance of this tournament. She only made a starting appearance in the semi-final, but was still included in UEFA's list of players to watch from the tournament, both for her contributions to attacking play and her speed in defense. Later that year, she was part of the England squad that also came fourth in the 2008 FIFA U-17 Women's World Cup (also its inaugural edition) in New Zealand, where she was only absent from the starting line-up for England's opening match against Brazil (coming on in the 69th minute) and picked up two yellow cards at the end of the tournament. From the middle of 2008, Bronze regularly played for both the under-17 and under-19 teams, with her first competitive under-19 games coming in September that year.

She was a crucial part of the under-19 squad that won the UEFA Women's Under-19 Championship in July 2009. Following her knee injury, she was told she would not be called up for the next under-19 Euro, later noting that she felt a lack of support during her recovery. She was part of the under-19 squad that finished runners-up to France in the 2010 under-19 Euro, providing the long-range assist for Toni Duggan's opening goal in their first match, a 3–1 victory over Scotland.

She was called into an England under-20 training camp in January 2010. After featuring in all three games during the 2010 FIFA U-20 Women's World Cup, Bronze made her debut for the England under-23 team in a 2–1 win over Germany in September 2010. At the La Manga tournament in March 2013, with the under-23 squad, Bronze provided the shot that led to an own goal off a Norwegian defender in the closing minutes, leading England to win 1–0.

==== 2013–2014: Debut and playing as centre-half ====
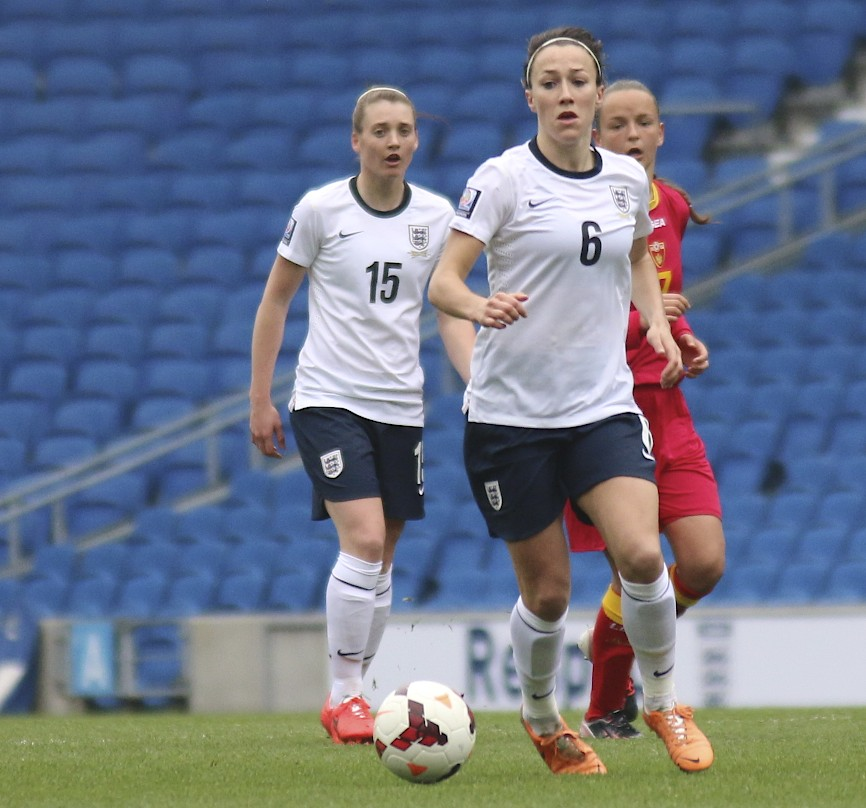
Bronze (foreground; number 6) playing against Montenegro in 2014

When Bronze was 16, her parents were approached by Mónica Jorge of the Portuguese football association, who extended an invitation for Bronze to join and train with Portugal. Bronze later said she seriously considered this offer for several years and was prepared to switch to Portugal when she was 22; though she was playing for the England youth teams, she was consistently left out of the senior England squad under manager Hope Powell. Through relatives, she would also have been eligible to play for Scotland. Bronze made her debut for the England senior team on 26 June 2013 as a substitute in the 67th minute for Dunia Susi in a friendly against world champions Japan at the Pirelli Stadium in Burton-upon-Trent. She had a claimed goal disallowed in the 89th minute of the 1–1 draw. The following month, she was an unused member of the squad at Euro 2013 in Sweden, a group stage exit.

Bronze scored her first England goal on 14 June 2014, in a 3–0 away win over Belarus in World Cup qualification; she scored again on 17 September 2014, as England concluded their qualification process with a 10–0 away win over Montenegro and a 100% record, with Bronze having played in nine of the ten matches. On 23 November 2014 Bronze started in the first England women's match at Wembley Stadium, a 0–3 loss to Germany. In her first years with England, she played as a centre-half alongside Steph Houghton, with Alex Scott first choice in Bronze's preferred right-back role.

==== 2015–2017: Securing right-back role at World Cup and Euros ====
She went into the 2015 Women's World Cup after a knee operation and less regular playing time, and began the tournament as a left-sided defensive midfielder before moving to right-back, displacing Scott, while still in the group stage. In the knock-out game against Norway, she scored an iconic winning goal from outside the penalty area as England came from behind to win 2–1, their first knock-out win at the World Cup. Coach Mark Sampson said after the match that Bronze could be the best right-back in the world. Reflecting on the goal in 2019, Bronze said that it "set [her] career alight a little bit", seeing her gain wider recognition; in 2022 FIFA included it as one of the best-ever goals scored at a Women's World Cup. She also went on to score what proved to be the quarter-final winner against Canada as she netted England's second from a header in the 14th minute. She was widely praised as one of the best performers for England at the World Cup, winning England Player of the Year and being the first women's footballer to be nominated for the BBC Sports Personality of the Year Award, and was included in the tournament's All-Star Team and shortlisted for the Golden Ball. England placed third at the 2015 World Cup, after defeating Germany in the bronze medal match.

In July 2017, she was named in the squad for the UEFA Women's Euro 2017, which England lost 3–0 to eventual winners Netherlands in the semi-final. For her performances in the tournament, Bronze was included in the 2017 UEFA Team of the Tournament.

==== 2018–2019: Vice captaincy, World Cup and midfield experiment ====
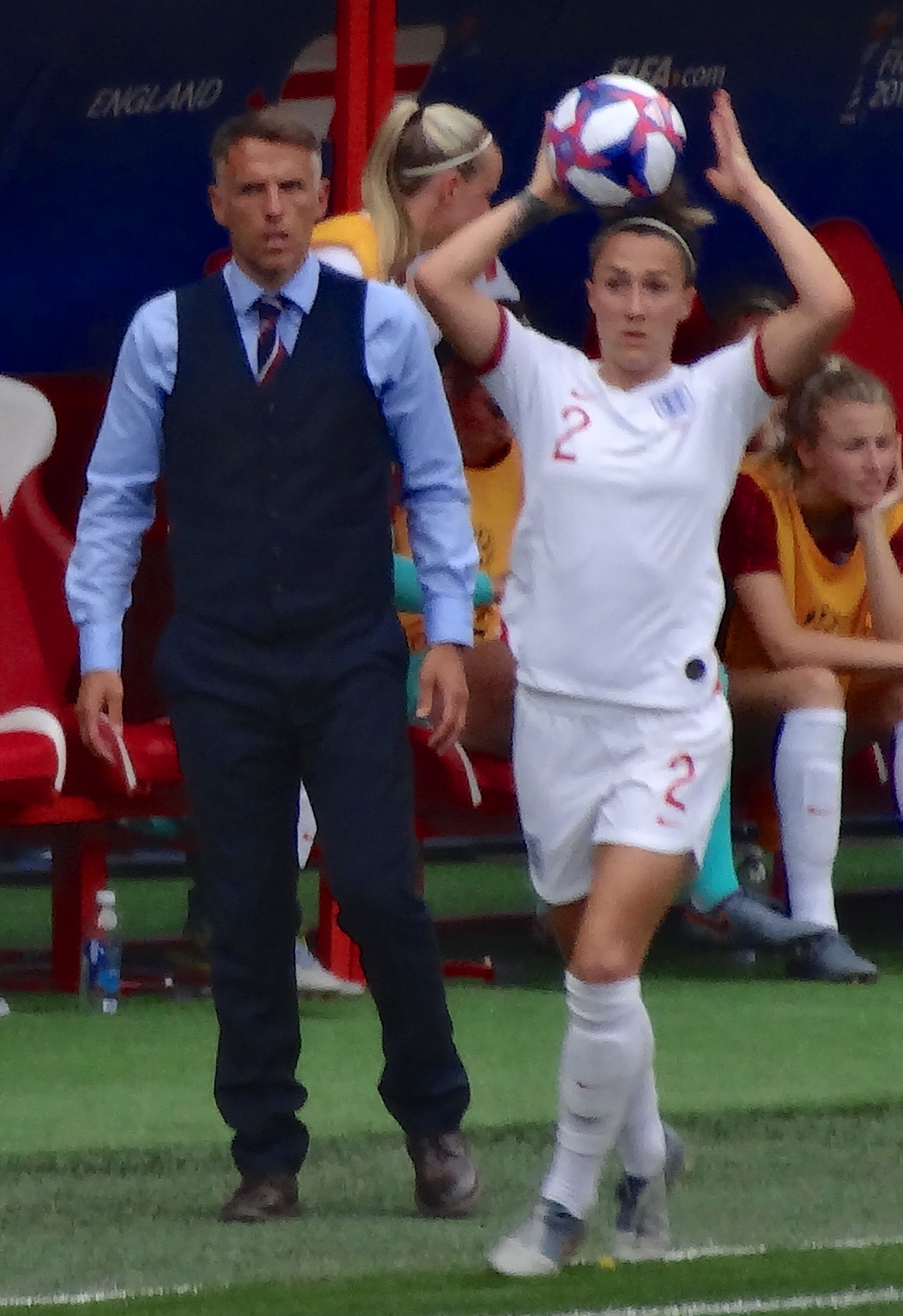
Bronze during the 2019 FIFA Women's World Cup, with then-England coach Phil Neville; he is one of the people to call Bronze the best player in the world.

Bronze captained England for the first time in the 2018 SheBelieves Cup opening match against France. She was the formal captain for this tournament with Steph Houghton out injured, as well as for several of the World Cup qualifying matches later in the year. She scored in one of these qualifying matches, a 6–0 win against Kazakhstan, after coming on to replace Walsh and taking the armband from her. In 2019, Bronze was part of the England team that won the SheBelieves Cup in the United States. In some matches at this tournament, she played in central midfield; under Phil Neville, Bronze was played as a midfielder on several occasions, with Neville each time giving much praise to her abilities in the role and the popularity of her playing there. He also lauded her ability to play alongside Walsh as the midfield anchor, describing the pair as "colossi". Stated to be part of a plan to make Bronze a back-up 'number 8', which she was on-board with, Neville positively compared Bronze's adaptability to that of Philipp Lahm under Pep Guardiola, noting that "[Lahm] was voted one of the best right-backs, but [Guardiola] put him into midfield."

As Houghton's vice-captain, Bronze was selected for the 2019 World Cup squad; in the May 2019 squad announcement her name was revealed by Alex Scott as part of the social-media marketing for the tournament. Bronze was briefly taken ill at the tournament with a virus but was fit to play in England's quarter-final match against Norway; in it, she not only excelled in defense and down the wing, but also scored from just outside the area during a 3–0 victory, a goal reminiscent of the one she scored against the same opposition in 2015. After the game, Phil Neville said her performance solidified her status as "the best player in the world", something he had described Bronze as on previous occasions. England finished the tournament in fourth place. Bronze ended up winning the Silver Ball, behind Megan Rapinoe, and being included in the team of the tournament. (Note: The all-star squad in 2019 was named "Players who Dared to Shine".)

After the World Cup, Bronze played as a central midfielder in friendlies against Belgium and Norway. Neville hoped that developing her skills in this position would make it possible to extend her career by gradually moving her to the midfield role; already 27 in 2019, Bronze had been told when she first injured her knee that it was unlikely she would be able to keep playing past this age. Bronze did not convert to the midfield, continuing to play predominantly in her inverted full-back role.

==== 2022–present: Back to back Euros victories, World Cup Final and continued prominence ====
In June 2022, Bronze was named to the England squad for the home Women's Euro in July, which England won. At the tournament, she scored against Sweden. In the final, she got the first touch of the ball from a corner to bounce it into the box, leading to England's winning goal by Chloe Kelly with 10 minutes left of extra time in the final against Germany. After winning the Euro, UEFA wrote that all Bronze was missing was a World Cup title. Including appearances for Great Britain at the Olympics, the Euro 2022 final was Bronze's 100th international match. She achieved her 100th England cap on 11 October 2022 in a 0–0 draw against the Czech Republic. As European champions, England contested the 2023 Women's Finalissima in April 2023, defeating Copa América champions Brazil on penalties to win 1(4)–1(2), with Bronze being voted England player of the match. In November 2022, the FA introduced legacy numbers to honour the 50th anniversary of the women's team; Bronze was the 181st player to represent the Lionesses and her matchday shirts will feature this number.

Bronze participated in the 2023 FIFA Women's World Cup; England reached the final for the first time for a second-placed finish behind Spain. Bronze played most of the tournament as a right wing-back. In the final, she lost possession of the ball in the lead-up to Spain's solitary goal in the 0–1 England loss, considered the fault of a lack of communication with Ella Toone. While sports media criticised Bronze for failing to regain possession, it also mentioned the "cruelty" of her involvement in the conceded goal, as the player who is considered to have "given more to English football than any [other] member of the squad". If England had won the World Cup, Bronze would have 'completed football'.

Shortly after the 2023 World Cup, the 2023–24 UEFA Women's Nations League began, with England in League A. Their opening match against Scotland was held in Sunderland, with supporters treating it as a homecoming for Bronze; she scored a header for England's first goal in their 2–1 victory. Bronze scored twice more in the Nations League group stage: an equaliser against Belgium before England lost 2–3, and the dramatic sixth goal in the 6–0 last-match win over Scotland. A header scored with the final touch of the game, Bronze's goal looked like it would advance England into the Nations League Finals (and a chance for Great Britain to qualify for the 2024 Olympic Games) on goal difference, but the Netherlands scored another goal in the 95th minute of their own match to overtake England. In this victory over Scotland, Bronze played like a Total Footballer, covering positions from right back to left winger in what The Guardian described as "raging against the dying of the light" from the 32-year-old perpetually-injured Bronze.

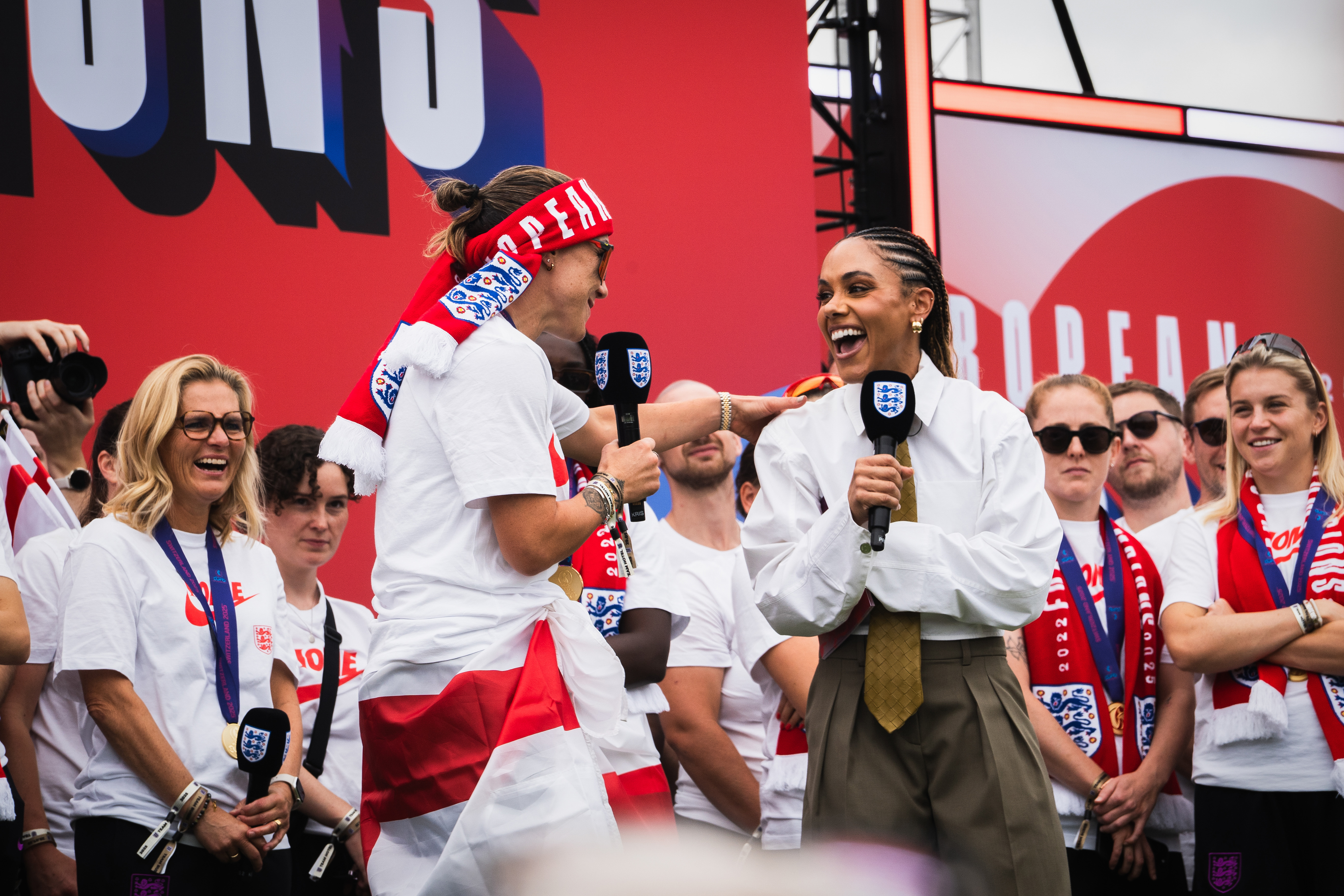
Bronze (centre left) joking with Alex Scott (centre right) during the victory parade after England won the Euro 2025

In June 2025, Bronze was again named to the squad for UEFA Women's Euro 2025. She scored England's first goal in their quarterfinal comeback victory over Sweden, before administering her own thigh strapping deep into extra time and then ripping it off as she stepped up to take their seventh and decisive penalty in the shoot-out. Scoring the penalty, a powerful shot down the middle of the goal, was called "her Boudica moment" in The Telegraph, which suggested it would be long-remembered. Manager Sarina Wiegman reflected that "Bronze is just one of a kind. I have never ever seen anything like this before in my life ... What defines her is that resilience, that fight. I think the only way to get her off the pitch is in the wheelchair." Bronze started in the tournament's final on 27 July 2025, and after England's win on penalties over Spain she revealed she had played through the tournament while having a fractured tibia.

Bronze passed Karen Carney to became the third highest-capped player for the Lionesses on 7 March 2026, as she made her 145th appearance in a 2–0 victory over Iceland in England's 2027 FIFA Women's World Cup qualification campaign, in which she scored the opening goal of the match.

=== Great Britain ===
Bronze was approached ahead of the 2012 Summer Olympics and told that she was on the longlist for selection to the Great Britain women's Olympic football team; at this point she still had not been called up to the senior England team and was pleased she was being considered. She noted that this is when she first learnt that football is played at the Olympic Games. She was not picked for the final team, and GB did not send football teams to the 2016 Games. Bronze represented Great Britain at the 2020 Summer Olympics, held in 2021. Playing in all four games, she helped create many of Team GB's goals, providing for club teammate Ellen White from the right wing.

== Style of play ==
Right back is not known for being the most glamorous and desirable position on the pitch. You have to be prepared to anticipate when to jump up and join an offensive opportunity, and you have to be set to sprint back when the opposition is in transition. [...] Bronze makes playing the position look easy.

— Harjeet Johal, Equalizer, April 2019

A tactically versatile right-back often deployed as an inverted full-back, Bronze has been compared to players of her position in Pep Guardiola's Bayern Munich, particularly Philipp Lahm.

Bronze demonstrates excellent skill in the full-back role, with stamina and speed down the wing, and the ability to play crosses into the box as well as make overlapping runs with her forward winger. Her tackles are usually perfectly-timed, and she has an exceptionally high rate of winning aerial duels. She has good numbers of interceptions and recoveries. Beyond these skills, Bronze also has creative play; when unable to find a pass, she can dribble past opposition defenders and will do so in the box as well as down the wing. Correspondingly, she is aggressive off the ball, making it hard for opposition to dribble past her. Her speed and reading of the game allow her to force opposition wingers into weaker positions through her body positioning, as well as enabling her to make late tackles and clearances when the opposition get close to goal. Bronze's positioning of choice on the wing can be very close to the touchline, widening her team's formation and often forcing the opposition full-back to either fully commit to marking her, leaving a larger space behind, or to be hesitant enough that Bronze is given space herself. When aiming to intercept, she can use her reading of the game to time movements to prevent spaces she leaves being exploited, while still able to arrive at the ball ahead of its target.

Contributing as much to her team's attack as its defence, Bronze often moves into the position of the right winger during the course of play or makes underlapping runs into interior space, allowing her to receive the ball from wingers pinned wide by opposition defenders. Beyond her role as right-back, she often plays as an inverted full-back, taking positions in both central defense and the midfield, roles she can play naturally or temporarily when moving in from the full-back position to overload the middle or cover for other players that have moved forward to attack. Moving into the middle as an inverted right-back also allows her to continue playing defensively further up the pitch, gaining possession and aiding her team's counter-attack.

In attack, Bronze is a goalscoring threat from set pieces off corner kicks and free kicks, is noted for ambitious runs into the box when not occupied, and has a high success rate in crossing the ball into the box for assists. She can also shoot with power from distance. In the midfield she may offer herself as a passing option to other midfielders, or exploit space they have created to move the ball forward. With Lyon, England and Barcelona, she has been utilised as both a conventional 'number 8' and a 'free 8', using her progressive right-back skills in the centre of the pitch or (at the latter two) as an option when an opposition makes it hard for Keira Walsh to play through balls. More likely to dribble than pass through the centre of the pitch, Bronze still boasts good vision for through balls, with a passing accuracy among England players in 2019 second only to Walsh.

== Other work and popular culture ==
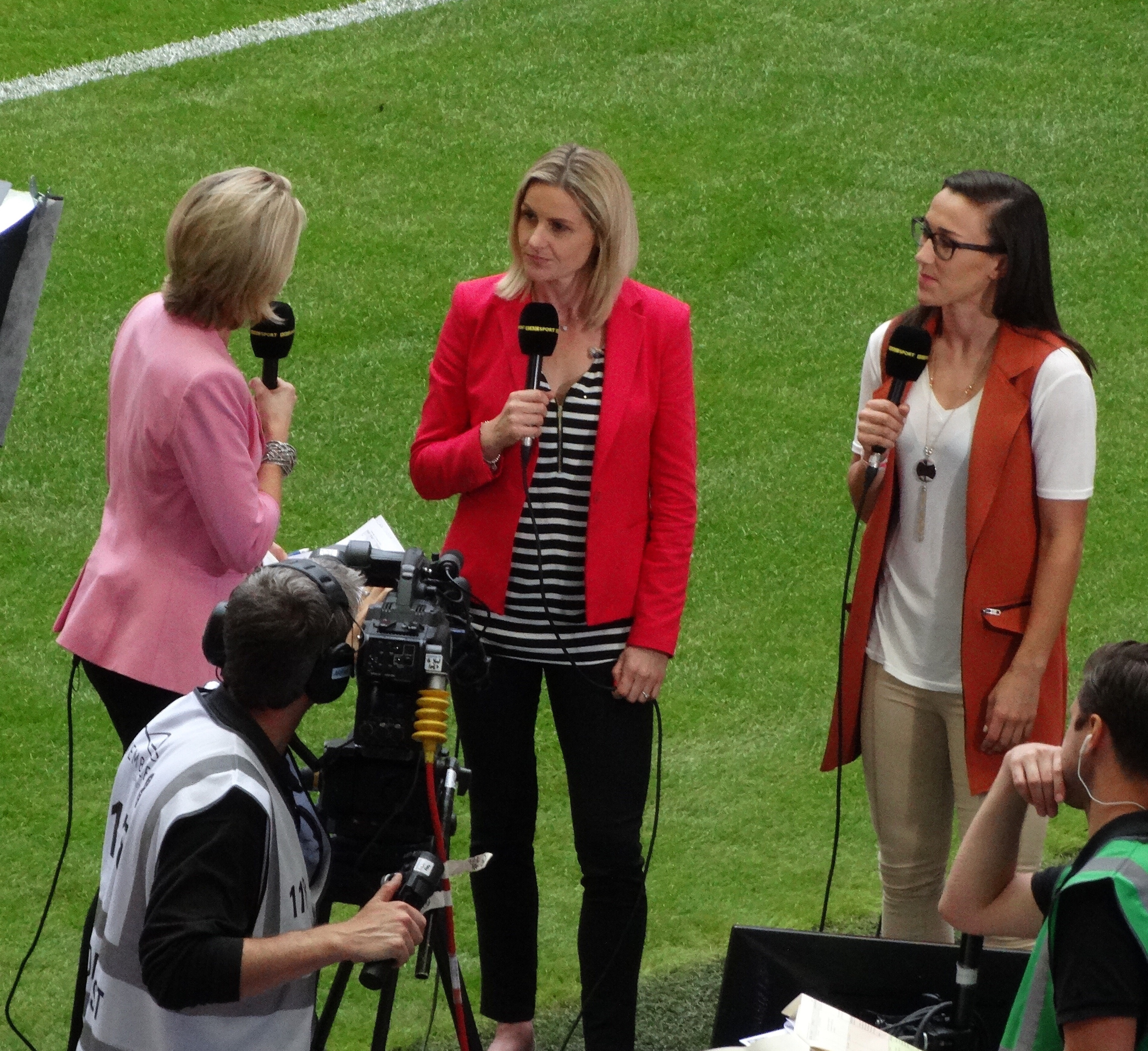
Bronze (right) and Kelly Smith (centre) providing pitchside punditry for a Chelsea vs Notts County match in 2015

Bronze is also an advocate for other professional footballers. She is a player representative for global football union FIFPRO's Global Player Council, to advise on decision making around international football, having joined in 2020 and being elected to continue when it was expanded in 2022. She is also a representative for EE's Hope United, which, among other things, aims to tackle online abuse directed at players.

In support of providing access for girls in football, Bronze took part in a 2016 match that saw 100 schoolgirls play against an all-star XI of England women's players. Said to be a player that has shaped women's football in her career, which spans two eras, Bronze was appointed Member of the Order of the British Empire (MBE) in the 2023 New Year Honours for services to association football.

Since 2019, in anticipation of the 2019 World Cup, she has written a column on football for the Metro. Since 2021, she has also written a column for Give Me Sport Women.

Her likeness appears in the FIFA video games that include women's players, with her player rating being consistently one of the highest (in FIFA 22, 92, joint-second of all players behind only Lionel Messi; in FIFA 23, 90, joint-fifth of all). Before women's players were included in the video games, Bronze remarked that "when they are I'll know the women's game is big". In 2020, to promote staying at home and medical charity fundraising during the COVID-19 pandemic, Bronze took part in the Football's Staying Home Cup, which saw professional footballers playing FIFA against each other in a knock-out bracket. She had previously said she enjoys playing the games.

After Bronze worked at Domino's in her early career, the franchise has publicly supported her. During the FIFA Women's World Cup 2019, the Domino's she had worked at in Headingley changed its shopfront to the colour bronze, while during the UEFA Women's Euro 2022 it changed its name to "Lucy's" and offered related promotions. Later in 2022, Bronze featured in a football-related recruitment campaign for Domino's.

== Personal life ==
She is multilingual, speaking English, Portuguese, Spanish and French. Bronze learnt French while playing for Lyon, and Spanish at Barcelona; she did not use an interpreter for the latter, due to her knowledge of Portuguese and French. Bronze has several tattoos, despite a phobia of needles, including a prominent wrist tattoo composed of multiple designs. This features stars – which she and Tar Heels teammates got after winning the championship in 2009, when Bronze had just turned 18 – and designs she drew herself when she was about 21, of the word "família" (Portuguese for "family") and a silhouette of Lindisfarne Castle, reflecting her origins. She grew up with pet dogs; with former partner Keira Walsh she has a West Highland White Terrier called Narla. As of 2023, she is in a relationship with former Barcelona teammate Ona Batlle.

Before she saw football as a viable full-time career, Bronze planned to become an accountant and continue to play football as a hobby, and has said if she had not taken up football then she would have pursued another sport as a career. She has suffered from knee injuries for most of her senior career, and said in 2019 that she found the strength to continue playing because she considered the death of a childhood friend, whose funeral she missed to play in the under-19 Euros she won, to be much worse than her pain. Around the time of his death she also felt guilt over missing the funeral and found she could not run, visiting a sports psychologist to overcome this. She has been diagnosed with autism, ADHD and dyslexia. Bronze has been an advocate for mental health support in general.

== Career statistics ==
=== College ===
Team	Season	NCAA Regular Season			ACC Tournament		NCAA Tournament		Total	
Team	Season	Division	Apps	Goals	Apps	Goals	Apps	Goals	Apps	Goals
North Carolina Tar Heels	2009	Div. I	15	0	3	1	6	2	24	3

=== Club ===
As of match played 21 November 2026

Appearances and goals by club, season and competition
Club	Season	League			Cup (Note: Includes the Women's FA Cup, Coupe de France and Copa de la Reina)		Other (Note: Includes the Women's Premier League Cup, WSL Cup, Trophée des Championnes and Supercopa de España)		Europe (Note: Includes the UEFA Women's Champions League)		Total	
Club	Season	Division	Apps	Goals	Apps	Goals	Apps	Goals	Apps	Goals	Apps	Goals
Sunderland	2007–08	WPL Northern	9	4	0	0	1	0	—		10	4
Sunderland	2008–09	WPL Northern	9	1	0	0	2	0	—		11	1
Sunderland	2009–10	WPL National	3	0	0	0	0	0	—		3	0
Sunderland	2010–11	WPL National	4	0	0	0	0	0	—		4	0
Sunderland	Total		25	5	0	0	3	0	—		28	5
Everton	2011	WSL	9	0	0	0	2	0	6	0	17	0
Everton	2012	WSL	11	2	0	0	2	0	0	0	13	2
Everton	Total		20	2	0	0	4	0	6	0	30	2
Liverpool	2013	WSL	14	1	1	0	4	0	—		19	1
Liverpool	2014	WSL 1	14	2	2	0	5	0	2	0	23	2
Liverpool	Total		28	3	3	0	9	0	2	0	42	3
Manchester City	2015	WSL 1	11	2	1	0	4	0	—		16	2
Manchester City	2016	WSL 1	16	2	3	0	4	1	8	3	31	6
Manchester City	2017	WSL 1	7	1	4	2	0	0	3	1	14	4
Manchester City	Sub-total		34	5	8	2	8	1	11	4	61	12
Olympique Lyonnais	2017–18	Division 1	19	2	3	0	—		8	2	30	4
Olympique Lyonnais	2018–19	Division 1	16	1	4	0	—		9	1	29	2
Olympique Lyonnais	2019–20	Division 1	15	0	2	0	1	0	6	0	24	0
Olympique Lyonnais	Total		50	3	9	0	1	0	23	3	83	6
Manchester City	2020–21	WSL	18	2	2	0	3	0	5	0	28	2
Manchester City	2021–22	WSL	13	0	5	0	4	0	0	0	22	0
Manchester City	Sub-total		31	2	7	0	7	0	5	0	50	2
Barcelona	2022–23	Liga F	20	3	1	0	2	0	9	0	32	3
Barcelona	2023–24	Liga F	21	1	5	0	2	0	10	1	38	2
Barcelona	Total		41	4	6	0	4	0	19	1	70	5
Chelsea	2024–25	WSL	19	2	3	0	1	0	8	1	31	3
Chelsea	2025–26	WSL	13	0	3	0	2	0	7	2	25	2
Chelsea	2026–27	WSL	10	1	0	0	—		6	0	16	1
Chelsea	Total		42	3	6	0	3	0	21	3	72	6
Career total			271	27	39	2	39	1	87	11	436	41

=== International ===
Caps and goals correct as of 5 June 2026.

Year	England		Great Britain	
Year	Apps	Goals	Apps	Goals
2013	8	0	—N/a	
2014	6	2	—N/a	
2015	7	2	—N/a	
2016	12	0	—N/a	
2017	17	2	—N/a	
2018	11	1	—N/a	
2019	19	1	—N/a	
2020	0	0	—N/a	
2021	3	1	4	0
2022	17	2	—N/a	
2023	18	4	—N/a	
2024	9	1	—N/a	
2025	17	5	—N/a	
2026	4	1	—N/a	
Total	148	22	4	0

Scores and results list England's goal tally first, score column indicates score after each Bronze goal.

List of international goals scored by Lucy Bronze
No.	Date	Venue	Opponent	Score	Result	Competition	Ref.
1	14 June 2014	Traktar Stadium, Minsk, Belarus	Belarus	3–0	3–0	World Cup 2015 qualification	
2	17 September 2014	Stadion Pod Malim Brdom, Petrovac, Montenegro	Montenegro	4–0	10–0	World Cup 2015 qualification	
3	22 June 2015	Lansdowne Stadium, Ottawa, Canada	Norway	2–1	2–1	2015 FIFA Women's World Cup	
4	27 June 2015	BC Place, Vancouver, Canada	Canada	2–0	2–1	2015 FIFA Women's World Cup	
5	10 April 2017	Stadium MK, Milton Keynes, England	Austria	2–0	3–0	Friendly	
6	19 September 2017	Prenton Park, Birkenhead, England	Russia	4–0	6–0	World Cup 2019 qualification	
7	4 September 2018	Pavlodar Central Stadium, Pavlodar, Kazakhstan	Kazakhstan	6–0	6–0	World Cup 2019 qualification	
8	27 June 2019	Stade Océane, Le Havre, France	Norway	3–0	3–0	2019 FIFA Women's World Cup	
9	23 February 2021	St. George's Park, Burton upon Trent, England	Northern Ireland	3–0	6–0	Friendly	
10	24 June 2022	Elland Road, Leeds, England	Netherlands	1–1	5–1	Friendly	
11	26 July 2022	Bramall Lane, Sheffield, England	Sweden	2–0	4–0	UEFA Women's Euro 2022	
12	22 February 2023	Ashton Gate, Bristol, England	Belgium	5–0	6–1	2023 Arnold Clark Cup	
13	22 September 2023	Stadium of Light, Sunderland, England	Scotland	1–0	2–1	2023–24 UEFA Women's Nations League A	
14	31 October 2023	Den Dreef, Leuven, Belgium	Belgium	1–1	2–3	2023–24 UEFA Women's Nations League A	
15	5 December 2023	Hampden Park, Glasgow, Scotland	Scotland	6–0	6–0	2023–24 UEFA Women's Nations League A	
16	25 October 2024	Wembley Stadium, London, England	Germany	3–4	3–4	Friendly	
17	4 April 2025	Ashton Gate, Bristol, England	Belgium	1–0	5–0	2025 UEFA Women's Nations League A	
18	30 May 2025	Wembley Stadium, London, England	Portugal	2–0	6–0	2025 UEFA Women's Nations League A	
19	29 June 2025	King Power Stadium, Leicester, England	Jamaica	2–0	7–0	Friendly	
20	17 July 2025	Letzigrund, Zurich, Switzerland	Sweden	1–2	2–2 (a.e.t.) (3–2 p)	UEFA Women's Euro 2025	
21	28 October 2025	Pride Park Stadium, Derby, England	Australia	2–0	3–0	Friendly	
22	7 March 2026	City Ground, Nottingham, England	Iceland	1–0	2–0	2027 FIFA Women's World Cup qualification	

== Honours ==
University of North Carolina

- ACC Women's Soccer Tournament: 2009
- NCAA Women's Soccer Championship: 2009

Sunderland

- FA Women's Premier League Northern Division: 2008–09
- FA Women's Cup runner-up: 2008–09

Liverpool

- FA WSL: 2013, 2014

Manchester City

- FA WSL: 2016
- FA WSL Cup: 2016, 2021–22
- FA Women's Cup: 2016–17, 2019–20

Lyon

- UEFA Women's Champions League: 2017–18, 2018–19, 2019–20
- Division 1 Féminine: 2017–18, 2018–19, 2019–20
- Coupe de France féminine: 2019, 2020
- Trophée des Championnes: 2019

Barcelona

- Liga F: 2022–23, 2023–24
- UEFA Women's Champions League: 2022–23, 2023–24
- Copa de la Reina: 2023–24
- Supercopa de España Femenina: 2022–23, 2023–24

Chelsea

- FA WSL: 2024–25
- FA Women's Cup: 2024–25
- FA Women's League Cup: 2024–25, 2025–26

England U19

- UEFA Women's Under-19 Championship: 2009; runner-up 2010

England

- FIFA Women's World Cup runner-up: 2023; third place: 2015
- UEFA Women's Championship: 2022, 2025
- Women's Finalissima: 2023
- SheBelieves Cup: 2019
- Arnold Clark Cup: 2022, 2023

Individual

- Sunderland Manager's Player of the Year: 2007–08
- NCAA Soccer America All-Freshman Second Team: 2009
- PFA Team of the Year: 2013–14, 2014–15, 2015–16, 2016–17
- PFA Women's Players' Player of the Year: 2013–14, 2016–17
- FIFA Women's World Cup All-Star Squad: 2015, 2019
- England Player of the Year: 2015, 2019
- BBC Sports Personality of the Year Award nominee: 2015
- FA WSL 1 Players' Player of the Year: 2016
- MCWFC Etihad Airways Player of the Season: 2016
- UEFA Women's Player of the Year Award: eighth 2016–17, fifth 2017–18, won 2018–19, third 2019–20
- Trophées FFF D1 Féminine Team of the Year: 2017–2018
- FIFA FIFPRO Women's World 11: 2017, 2019, 2020, 2021, 2022, 2023, 2024, 2025, 2026
- IFFHS Women's World Team: 2017, 2018, 2019, 2020, 2022, 2025
- BBC Women's Footballer of the Year: 2018, 2020
- Ballon d'Or Féminin: sixth 2018, second 2019, tenth 2022, ninth 2025
- FIFA Women's World Cup Silver Ball: 2019
- Globe Soccer Awards Best Women's Player of the Year: 2019
- The Best FIFA Women's Player: 2020
- The Best FIFA Women's 11: 2024, 2025
- IFFHS World All-time Women's Dream Team: awarded 2021
- IFFHS Europe All-time Women's Dream Team: awarded 2021
- FA WSL Player of the Month: February 2021
- IFFHS England All-time Women's Dream Team: awarded 2022
- Freedom of the City of London (announced 1 August 2022)
- IFFHS Women's UEFA Team: 2020 2021, 2022, 2024
- UEFA Women's Championship Team of the Tournament: 2025

Orders

- Member of the Most Excellent Order of the British Empire in the 2023 New Year Honours

== See also ==
- List of England women's international footballers
- List of Manchester City W.F.C. players
- List of University of North Carolina at Chapel Hill Olympians
- List of women's footballers with 100 or more international caps
