= PFA Team of the Year (2010s) =

Annual award

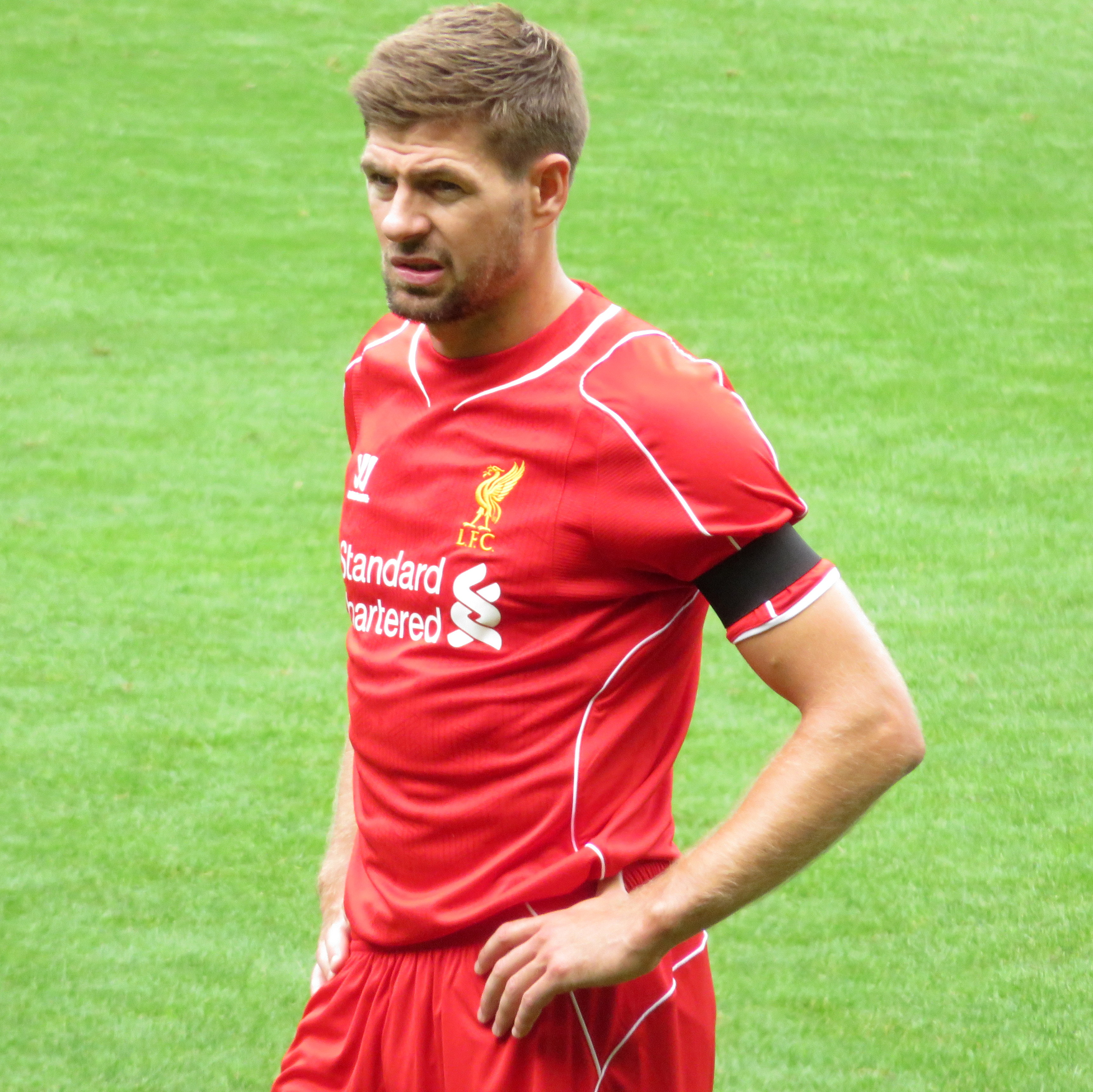
Steven Gerrard appeared in the PFA Premier League Team of the Year eight times.

The Professional Footballers' Association Team of the Year (often called the PFA Team of the Year, or simply the Team of the Year) is an annual award given to a set of 55 footballers across the top four tiers of men's English football; the Premier League, the Championship, League One and League Two, as well as the women's FA WSL, who are seen to be deserving of being named in a "Team of the Year". Peter Shilton currently holds the most appearances in the PFA Team of the Year in the top division with 10 appearances. Steven Gerrard currently holds the most appearances in the PFA Team of the Year in the Premier League era with eight appearances.

The award has been presented since the 1973–74 season and the shortlist is compiled by the members of the players' trade union, the Professional Footballers' Association (PFA), in January of every year, with the winners then being voted for by the other players in their respective divisions. The award is regarded by players in the Football League as the highest accolade available to them, due to it being picked by their fellow professionals. Oxford United's Damian Batt, who was named in the Team of the Year for League Two in 2011, said he was "very pleased to be given such a prestigious award. It is something that I am very proud of". In 2014, a team for female players competing in the FA WSL was selected for the first time.

== Key ==
- Heading key: Pos. – Position; App. – Number of appearances in a PFA Team of the Year.
- Position key: GK – Goalkeeper; DF – Defender; MF – Midfielder; FW – Forward.
- Players marked † appeared in a first tier PFA Team of the Year more than once.
- Players marked ‡ appeared in a second tier PFA Team of the Year more than once.
- Players marked * appeared in a third tier PFA Team of the Year more than once.
- Players marked ¤ appeared in a fourth tier PFA Team of the Year more than once.

== Winners ==
=== 2009–10 ===
==== Premier League ====
Pos.	Player	Club	App.
GK	Joe Hart	Birmingham City	2
DF	Branislav Ivanović	Chelsea	1
DF	Thomas Vermaelen	Arsenal	1
DF	Richard Dunne	Aston Villa	1
DF	Patrice Evra †	Manchester United	3
MF	Antonio Valencia	Manchester United	1
MF	Cesc Fàbregas †	Arsenal	2
MF	Darren Fletcher	Manchester United	1
MF	James Milner	Aston Villa	1
FW	Wayne Rooney †	Manchester United	2
FW	Didier Drogba †	Chelsea	2

==== Championship ====
Pos.	Player	Club	App.
GK	Lee Camp	Nottingham Forest	1
DF	Chris Gunter	Nottingham Forest	1
DF	Fabricio Coloccini	Newcastle United	1
DF	Ashley Williams	Swansea City	1
DF	José Enrique	Newcastle United	1
MF	Graham Dorrans	West Bromwich Albion	1
MF	Peter Whittingham	Cardiff City	1
MF	Kevin Nolan	Newcastle United	1
MF	Charlie Adam	Blackpool	1
FW	Andy Carroll	Newcastle United	1
FW	Michael Chopra ‡	Cardiff City	2

==== League One ====
Pos.	Player	Club	App.
GK	Kelvin Davis	Southampton	2
DF	Frazer Richardson	Charlton Athletic	1
DF	Patrick Kisnorbo	Leeds United	1
DF	Gary Doherty	Norwich City	1
DF	Ian Harte	Carlisle United	2
MF	Wes Hoolahan *	Norwich City	2
MF	Jason Puncheon	Southampton (Note: Puncheon played for Milton Keynes Dons until January 2010.)	2
MF	Robert Snodgrass	Leeds United	1
MF	Nicky Bailey	Charlton Athletic	1
FW	Rickie Lambert *	Southampton	2
FW	Grant Holt	Norwich City	2

==== League Two ====
Pos.	Player	Club	App.
GK	Kasper Schmeichel	Notts County	1
DF	John Brayford	Crewe Alexandra	1
DF	Craig Dawson	Rochdale	1
DF	Ian Sharps	Rotherham United	1
DF	Tom Kennedy ¤	Rochdale	2
MF	Ben Davies ¤	Notts County	2
MF	Stephen Dawson	Bury	1
MF	Gary Jones	Rochdale	1
MF	Nicky Law	Rotherham United	1
FW	Lee Hughes	Notts County	2
FW	Adam Le Fondre	Rotherham United	1

=== 2010–11 ===
==== Premier League ====
Pos.	Player	Club	App.
GK	Edwin van der Sar †	Manchester United	3
DF	Bacary Sagna †	Arsenal	2
DF	Nemanja Vidić †	Manchester United	4
DF	Vincent Kompany	Manchester City	1
DF	Ashley Cole †	Chelsea	4
MF	Nani	Manchester United	1
MF	Samir Nasri	Arsenal	1
MF	Jack Wilshere	Arsenal	1
MF	Gareth Bale	Tottenham Hotspur	2
FW	Carlos Tevez	Manchester City	1
FW	Dimitar Berbatov †	Manchester United	2

==== Championship ====
Pos.	Player	Club	App.
GK	Paddy Kenny	Queens Park Rangers	1
DF	Kyle Naughton ‡	Leicester City	2
DF	Ashley Williams ‡	Swansea City	2
DF	Wes Morgan	Nottingham Forest	1
DF	Ian Harte	Reading	3
MF	Adel Taarabt	Queens Park Rangers	1
MF	Andy King	Leicester City	1
MF	Wes Hoolahan	Norwich City	3
MF	Scott Sinclair	Swansea City	1
FW	Danny Graham	Watford	1
FW	Grant Holt	Norwich City	3

==== League One ====
Pos.	Player	Club	App.
GK	Kelvin Davis *	Southampton	3
DF	Iñigo Calderón	Brighton & Hove Albion	1
DF	Gordon Greer	Brighton & Hove Albion	1
DF	José Fonte	Southampton	1
DF	Dan Harding	Southampton	1
MF	Anthony Pilkington	Huddersfield Town	1
MF	Adam Lallana	Southampton	1
MF	Alex Oxlade-Chamberlain	Southampton	1
MF	Elliott Bennett	Brighton & Hove Albion	1
FW	Craig Mackail-Smith	Peterborough United	1
FW	Bradley Wright-Phillips	Charlton Athletic (Note: Wright-Phillips played for Plymouth Argyle until January 2011.)	1

==== League Two ====
Pos.	Player	Club	App.
GK	Tommy Lee	Chesterfield	1
DF	Damian Batt	Oxford United	1
DF	Ian Sharps ¤	Shrewsbury Town	2
DF	Guy Branston	Torquay United	1
DF	Joe Skarz	Bury	1
MF	Danny Whitaker	Chesterfield	1
MF	Jimmy Ryan	Accrington Stanley	1
MF	Nicky Law ¤	Rotherham United	2
MF	Gareth Ainsworth ¤	Wycombe Wanderers	2
FW	Ryan Lowe	Bury	1
FW	Craig Davies	Chesterfield	1

=== 2011–12 ===
==== Premier League ====
Pos.	Player	Club	App.
GK	Joe Hart †	Manchester City	3
DF	Kyle Walker	Tottenham Hotspur	1
DF	Vincent Kompany †	Manchester City	2
DF	Fabricio Coloccini	Newcastle United	2
DF	Leighton Baines	Everton	1
MF	David Silva	Manchester City	1
MF	Yaya Touré	Manchester City	1
MF	Scott Parker	Tottenham Hotspur	1
MF	Gareth Bale †	Tottenham Hotspur	3
FW	Robin van Persie	Arsenal	1
FW	Wayne Rooney †	Manchester United	3

==== Championship ====
Pos.	Player	Club	App.
GK	Kelvin Davis ‡	Southampton	4
DF	Nathaniel Clyne	Crystal Palace	1
DF	James Tomkins	West Ham United	1
DF	Curtis Davies ‡	Birmingham City	3
DF	Ian Harte ‡	Reading	4
MF	Adam Lallana	Southampton	2
MF	Peter Whittingham ‡	Cardiff City	2
MF	Mark Noble	West Ham United	1
MF	Matt Phillips	Blackpool	1
FW	Rickie Lambert	Southampton	3
FW	Jay Rodriguez	Burnley	1

==== League One ====
Pos.	Player	Club	App.
GK	Ben Hamer	Charlton Athletic	1
DF	Jack Hunt	Huddersfield Town	1
DF	Michael Morrison	Charlton Athletic	1
DF	Harry Maguire	Sheffield United	1
DF	Rhoys Wiggins	Charlton Athletic	1
MF	Johnnie Jackson	Charlton Athletic	1
MF	Stephen Quinn	Sheffield United	1
MF	Stephen Gleeson	Milton Keynes Dons	1
MF	Darren Potter	Milton Keynes Dons	1
FW	Jordan Rhodes	Huddersfield Town	1
FW	Ched Evans	Sheffield United	1

==== League Two ====
Pos.	Player	Club	App.
GK	Bobby Olejnik	Torquay United	1
DF	Paul Caddis	Swindon Town	1
DF	Kyle McFadzean	Crawley Town	1
DF	Ian Sharps ¤	Shrewsbury Town	3
DF	Kevin Nicholson	Torquay United	1
MF	Matt Ritchie	Swindon Town	1
MF	Marlon Pack	Cheltenham Town	1
MF	Eunan O'Kane	Torquay United	1
MF	Lee Mansell	Torquay United	1
FW	Izale McLeod ¤	Barnet	2
FW	Tyrone Barnett	Crawley Town	1

=== 2012–13 ===
==== Premier League ====
Pos.	Player	Club	App.
GK	David de Gea	Manchester United	1
DF	Pablo Zabaleta	Manchester City	1
DF	Jan Vertonghen	Tottenham Hotspur	1
DF	Rio Ferdinand †	Manchester United	6
DF	Leighton Baines †	Everton	2
MF	Gareth Bale †	Tottenham Hotspur	4
MF	Juan Mata	Chelsea	1
MF	Michael Carrick	Manchester United	2
MF	Eden Hazard	Chelsea	1
FW	Robin van Persie †	Manchester United	2
FW	Luis Suárez	Liverpool	1

==== Championship ====
Pos.	Player	Club	App.
GK	Kasper Schmeichel	Leicester City	2
DF	Kieran Trippier	Burnley	1
DF	Wes Morgan ‡	Leicester City	2
DF	Mark Hudson	Cardiff City	1
DF	Wayne Bridge	Brighton & Hove Albion	2
MF	Wilfried Zaha	Crystal Palace	1
MF	Tom Ince	Blackpool	1
MF	Peter Whittingham ‡	Cardiff City	3
MF	Yannick Bolasie	Crystal Palace	1
FW	Glenn Murray	Crystal Palace	1
FW	Matěj Vydra	Watford	1

==== League One ====
Pos.	Player	Club	App.
GK	Wes Foderingham	Swindon Town	1
DF	Simon Francis	AFC Bournemouth	1
DF	Rob Jones	Doncaster Rovers	1
DF	Harry Maguire *	Sheffield United	2
DF	Charlie Daniels	AFC Bournemouth	1
MF	Matt Ritchie	AFC Bournemouth	2
MF	Luke Murphy	Crewe Alexandra	1
MF	Alan Judge	Notts County	1
MF	David Cotterill	Doncaster Rovers	1
FW	Paddy Madden	Yeovil Town	1
FW	Leon Clarke	Coventry City	1

==== League Two ====
Pos.	Player	Club	App.
GK	Stuart Nelson	Gillingham	1
DF	Sean Clohessy	Southend United	1
DF	Adam Barrett ¤	Gillingham	3
DF	Ryan Cresswell	Southend United	1
DF	Joe Martin	Gillingham	1
MF	Jacques Maghoma	Burton Albion	1
MF	Marlon Pack ¤	Cheltenham Town	2
MF	Gary Jones ¤	Bradford City	2
MF	Jennison Myrie-Williams	Port Vale	1
FW	Tom Pope	Port Vale	1
FW	Jamie Cureton	Exeter City	1

=== 2013–14 ===
==== Premier League ====
Pos.	Player	Club	App.
GK	Petr Čech †	Chelsea	2
DF	Séamus Coleman	Everton	1
DF	Gary Cahill	Chelsea	1
DF	Vincent Kompany †	Manchester City	3
DF	Luke Shaw	Southampton	1
MF	Adam Lallana	Southampton	3
MF	Steven Gerrard †	Liverpool	8
MF	Yaya Touré †	Manchester City	2
MF	Eden Hazard †	Chelsea	2
FW	Daniel Sturridge	Liverpool	1
FW	Luis Suárez †	Liverpool	2

==== Championship ====
Pos.	Player	Club	App.
GK	Kasper Schmeichel ‡	Leicester City	3
DF	Kieran Trippier ‡	Burnley	2
DF	Wes Morgan ‡	Leicester City	3
DF	Jason Shackell	Burnley	1
DF	Aaron Cresswell	Ipswich Town	1
MF	Will Hughes	Derby County	1
MF	Danny Drinkwater	Leicester City	1
MF	Craig Bryson	Derby County	1
MF	Andy Reid ‡	Nottingham Forest	2
FW	Danny Ings	Burnley	1
FW	Ross McCormack	Leeds United	1

==== League One ====
Pos.	Player	Club	App.
GK	Carl Ikeme	Wolverhampton Wanderers	1
DF	Sam Ricketts	Wolverhampton Wanderers	2
DF	Danny Batth	Wolverhampton Wanderers	1
DF	Harry Maguire *	Sheffield United	3
DF	Jake Bidwell	Brentford	1
MF	Bakary Sako	Wolverhampton Wanderers	1
MF	Adam Forshaw	Brentford	1
MF	Kevin McDonald	Wolverhampton Wanderers	1
MF	Ben Pringle	Rotherham United	1
FW	Britt Assombalonga	Peterborough United	1
FW	Callum Wilson	Coventry City	1

==== League Two ====
Pos.	Player	Club	App.
GK	Tommy Lee ¤	Chesterfield	2
DF	Michael Smith	Bristol Rovers	1
DF	Ian Evatt	Chesterfield	1
DF	Liam Cooper	Chesterfield	1
DF	Michael Rose ¤	Rochdale	2
MF	Ian Henderson	Rochdale	1
MF	John-Joe O'Toole	Bristol Rovers	1
MF	Antoni Sarcevic	Fleetwood Town	1
MF	Gary Roberts	Chesterfield	1
FW	Sam Winnall	Scunthorpe United	1
FW	Scott Hogan	Rochdale	1

==== FA WSL 1 ====
Pos.	Player	Club	App.
GK	Siobhan Chamberlain	Bristol Academy	1
DF	Lucy Bronze	Liverpool	1
DF	Martha Harris	Lincoln Ladies	1
DF	Jemma Rose	Bristol Academy	1
DF	Gemma Bonner	Liverpool	1
MF	Fara Williams	Liverpool	1
MF	Jordan Nobbs	Arsenal	1
MF	Nicole Rolser	Liverpool	1
MF	Gemma Davison	Arsenal	1
FW	Danielle Carter	Arsenal	1
FW	Natasha Dowie	Liverpool	1

=== 2014–15 ===
==== Premier League ====
Pos.	Player	Club	App.
GK	David de Gea †	Manchester United	2
DF	Branislav Ivanović †	Chelsea	2
DF	John Terry †	Chelsea	4
DF	Gary Cahill †	Chelsea	2
DF	Ryan Bertrand	Southampton	1
MF	Alexis Sánchez	Arsenal	1
MF	Nemanja Matić	Chelsea	1
MF	Philippe Coutinho	Liverpool	1
MF	Eden Hazard †	Chelsea	3
FW	Diego Costa	Chelsea	1
FW	Harry Kane	Tottenham Hotspur	1

==== Championship ====
Pos.	Player	Club	App.
GK	Keiren Westwood ‡	Sheffield Wednesday	3
DF	Simon Francis	AFC Bournemouth	2
DF	Richard Keogh	Derby County	1
DF	Russell Martin	Norwich City	1
DF	George Friend	Middlesbrough	1
MF	Matt Ritchie	AFC Bournemouth	3
MF	Grant Leadbitter	Middlesbrough	1
MF	Bakary Sako	Wolverhampton Wanderers	2
MF	Alex Pritchard	Brentford	1
FW	Daryl Murphy	Ipswich Town	1
FW	Troy Deeney	Watford	1

==== League One ====
Pos.	Player	Club	App.
GK	Frank Fielding	Bristol City	1
DF	Nathan Byrne	Swindon Town	1
DF	Tom Clarke	Preston North End	1
DF	Aden Flint	Bristol City	1
DF	Joe Bryan	Bristol City	1
MF	Dele Alli	Milton Keynes Dons	1
MF	Luke Freeman	Bristol City	1
MF	Massimo Luongo	Swindon Town	1
MF	Korey Smith	Bristol City	1
FW	Joe Garner	Preston North End	1
FW	Eoin Doyle	Chesterfield	1

==== League Two ====
Pos.	Player	Club	App.
GK	Dan Bentley	Southend United	1
DF	Phil Edwards	Burton Albion	1
DF	Steve McNulty	Luton Town	1
DF	Connor Goldson	Shrewsbury Town	1
DF	Ben Coker	Southend United	1
MF	Ryan Woods	Shrewsbury Town	1
MF	Matt Grimes	Exeter City	1
MF	Jed Wallace	Portsmouth	1
MF	Danny Mayor	Bury	1
FW	Matt Tubbs	Portsmouth	1
FW	Reuben Reid	Plymouth Argyle	1

==== FA WSL 1 ====
Pos.	Player	Club	App.
GK	Carly Telford	Notts County	1
DF	Lucy Bronze †	Liverpool	2
DF	Casey Stoney	Arsenal	1
DF	Rachel Corsie	Notts County	1
DF	Emma Mitchell	Arsenal	1
MF	Ji So-yun	Chelsea	1
MF	Jill Scott	Manchester City	1
MF	Jo Potter	Birmingham City	1
MF	Karen Carney	Birmingham City	1
FW	Nikita Parris	Everton	1
FW	Eniola Aluko	Chelsea	1

=== 2015–16 ===
==== Premier League ====
Pos.	Player	Club	App.
GK	David de Gea †	Manchester United	3
DF	Héctor Bellerín	Arsenal	1
DF	Toby Alderweireld	Tottenham Hotspur	1
DF	Wes Morgan ‡	Leicester City	4
DF	Danny Rose	Tottenham Hotspur	1
MF	Riyad Mahrez	Leicester City	1
MF	Dele Alli	Tottenham Hotspur	2
MF	N'Golo Kanté	Leicester City	1
MF	Dimitri Payet	West Ham United	1
FW	Jamie Vardy	Leicester City	1
FW	Harry Kane †	Tottenham Hotspur	2

==== Championship ====
Pos.	Player	Club	App.
GK	Tom Heaton	Burnley	1
DF	Bruno	Brighton & Hove Albion	1
DF	Daniel Ayala (Note: Players tied for position.)	Middlesbrough	1
DF	Michael Dawson ‡	Hull City	2
DF	Michael Keane	Burnley	1
DF	George Friend ‡	Middlesbrough	2
MF	Adam Clayton	Middlesbrough	1
MF	Alan Judge	Brentford	2
MF	Joey Barton	Burnley	1
MF	Barry Bannan	Sheffield Wednesday	1
FW	Ross McCormack ‡	Fulham	2
FW	Andre Gray	Burnley	1

==== League One ====
Pos.	Player	Club	App.
GK	Jon McLaughlin	Burton Albion	1
DF	Reece Wabara	Wigan Athletic	1
DF	John Egan	Gillingham	1
DF	Craig Morgan	Wigan Athletic	1
DF	Rico Henry	Walsall	1
MF	Yanic Wildschut	Wigan Athletic	1
MF	Bradley Dack	Gillingham	1
MF	Romaine Sawyers	Walsall	1
MF	Mark Duffy	Burton Albion	1
FW	Adam Armstrong	Coventry City	1
FW	Will Grigg	Wigan Athletic	1

==== League Two ====
Pos.	Player	Club	App.
GK	Adam Smith	Northampton Town	1
DF	George Baldock	Oxford United	1
DF	Curtis Nelson	Plymouth Argyle	1
DF	Aaron Pierre	Wycombe Wanderers	1
DF	Joe Jacobson	Wycombe Wanderers	1
MF	Ricky Holmes	Northampton Town	1
MF	John-Joe O'Toole ¤	Northampton Town	2
MF	Matt Crooks	Accrington Stanley	1
MF	Kemar Roofe	Oxford United	1
FW	Jay Simpson	Leyton Orient	1
FW	Matty Taylor	Bristol Rovers	1

==== FA WSL 1 ====
Pos.	Player	Club	App.
GK	Hedvig Lindahl	Chelsea	1
DF	Lucy Bronze †	Manchester City	3
DF	Casey Stoney †	Arsenal	2
DF	Niamh Fahey	Chelsea	1
DF	Alex Greenwood	Notts County	1
MF	Ji So-yun †	Chelsea	2
MF	Vicky Losada	Arsenal	1
MF	Jill Scott †	Manchester City	2
MF	Izzy Christiansen	Manchester City	1
FW	Danielle Carter †	Arsenal	2
FW	Beth Mead	Sunderland	1

=== 2016–17 ===
==== Premier League ====
Pos.	Player	Club	App.
GK	David de Gea †	Manchester United	4
DF	Kyle Walker †	Tottenham Hotspur	2
DF	Gary Cahill †	Chelsea	3
DF	David Luiz	Chelsea	1
DF	Danny Rose †	Tottenham Hotspur	2
MF	Eden Hazard †	Chelsea	4
MF	Dele Alli †	Tottenham Hotspur	3
MF	N'Golo Kanté †	Chelsea	2
MF	Sadio Mané	Liverpool	1
FW	Harry Kane †	Tottenham Hotspur	3
FW	Romelu Lukaku	Everton	1

==== Championship ====
Pos.	Player	Club	App.
GK	David Stockdale	Brighton & Hove Albion	1
DF	Bruno ‡	Brighton & Hove Albion	2
DF	Lewis Dunk	Brighton & Hove Albion	1
DF	Jamaal Lascelles	Newcastle United	1
DF	Ryan Sessegnon	Fulham	1
MF	Tom Cairney	Fulham	1
MF	Anthony Knockaert	Brighton & Hove Albion	1
MF	Aaron Mooy	Huddersfield Town	1
MF	Jonjo Shelvey	Newcastle United	1
FW	Dwight Gayle	Newcastle United	1
FW	Chris Wood	Leeds United	1

==== League One ====
Pos.	Player	Club	App.
GK	Simon Moore	Sheffield United	1
DF	Kieron Freeman	Sheffield United	1
DF	Mark Beevers	Bolton Wanderers	1
DF	David Wheater	Bolton Wanderers	1
DF	James Meredith	Bradford City	1
MF	Mark Duffy *	Sheffield United	2
MF	John Fleck	Sheffield United	1
MF	Josh Morris	Scunthorpe United	1
MF	Erhun Oztumer	Walsall	1
FW	Billy Sharp *	Sheffield United	3
FW	James Vaughan	Bury	1

==== League Two ====
Pos.	Player	Club	App.
GK	Luke McCormick	Plymouth Argyle	1
DF	Kelvin Mellor	Blackpool	1
DF	Sonny Bradley	Plymouth Argyle	1
DF	Christian Burgess	Portsmouth	1
DF	Enda Stevens	Portsmouth	1
MF	Nicky Adams	Carlisle United	1
MF	Luke Berry	Cambridge United	1
MF	James Coppinger	Doncaster Rovers	1
MF	Graham Carey	Plymouth Argyle	1
FW	Danny Hylton	Luton Town	1
FW	John Marquis	Doncaster Rovers	1

==== FA WSL 1 ====
Pos.	Player	Club	App.
GK	Mary Earps	Reading	1
DF	Lucy Bronze †	Manchester City	4
DF	Jen Beattie	Manchester City	1
DF	Steph Houghton	Manchester City	1
DF	Jessica Carter	Birmingham City	1
MF	Karen Carney †	Chelsea	2
MF	Jill Scott †	Manchester City	3
MF	Jordan Nobbs †	Arsenal	2
MF	Caroline Weir	Liverpool	1
FW	Jane Ross	Manchester City	1
FW	Eniola Aluko †	Chelsea	2

=== 2017–18 ===
==== Premier League ====
Pos.	Player	Club	App.
GK	David de Gea †	Manchester United	5
DF	Kyle Walker †	Manchester City	3
DF	Nicolás Otamendi	Manchester City	1
DF	Jan Vertonghen †	Tottenham Hotspur	2
DF	Marcos Alonso	Chelsea	1
MF	David Silva †	Manchester City	2
MF	Christian Eriksen	Tottenham Hotspur	1
MF	Kevin De Bruyne	Manchester City	1
FW	Mohamed Salah	Liverpool	1
FW	Harry Kane †	Tottenham Hotspur	4
FW	Sergio Agüero	Manchester City	1

==== Championship ====
Pos.	Player	Club	App.
GK	John Ruddy	Wolverhampton Wanderers	1
DF	Ryan Fredericks	Fulham	1
DF	Sol Bamba	Cardiff City	1
DF	Willy Boly	Wolverhampton Wanderers	1
DF	Ryan Sessegnon ‡	Fulham	2
MF	James Maddison	Norwich City	1
MF	Rúben Neves	Wolverhampton Wanderers	1
MF	Tom Cairney ‡	Fulham	2
MF	Bobby Reid	Bristol City	1
FW	Leon Clarke	Sheffield United	2
FW	Matěj Vydra ‡	Derby County	2

==== League One ====
Pos.	Player	Club	App.
GK	Dean Henderson	Shrewsbury Town	1
DF	Nathan Byrne *	Wigan Athletic	2
DF	Charlie Mulgrew	Blackburn Rovers	1
DF	Dan Burn	Wigan Athletic	1
DF	Amari'i Bell	Blackburn Rovers (Note: Bell played for Fleetwood Town until January 2018.)	1
MF	Bradley Dack *	Blackburn Rovers	2
MF	Erhun Oztumer *	Walsall	2
MF	Nick Powell	Wigan Athletic	1
FW	Danny Graham	Blackburn Rovers	2
FW	Jack Marriott	Peterborough United	1
FW	Will Grigg *	Wigan Athletic	2

==== League Two ====
Pos.	Player	Club	App.
GK	Marek Štěch	Luton Town	1
DF	Jack Grimmer	Coventry City	1
DF	Alan Sheehan	Luton Town	1
DF	Mark Hughes	Accrington Stanley	1
DF	Dan Potts	Luton Town	1
MF	Jorge Grant	Notts County	1
MF	Luke Berry ¤	Luton Town	2
MF	Sean McConville	Accrington Stanley	1
FW	Adebayo Akinfenwa	Wycombe Wanderers	1
FW	Billy Kee	Accrington Stanley	1
FW	Danny Hylton ¤	Luton Town	2

==== FA WSL 1 ====
Pos.	Player	Club	App.
GK	Ann-Katrin Berger	Birmingham City	1
DF	Demi Stokes	Manchester City	1
DF	Millie Bright	Chelsea	1
DF	Aoife Mannion	Birmingham City	1
DF	Hannah Blundell	Chelsea	1
MF	Maren Mjelde	Chelsea	1
MF	Ji So-yun †	Chelsea	3
MF	Fara Williams †	Reading	2
FW	Beth Mead †	Arsenal	2
FW	Ellen White	Birmingham City	1
FW	Fran Kirby	Chelsea	1

=== 2018–19 ===
==== Premier League ====
Pos.	Player	Club	App.
GK	Ederson	Manchester City	1
DF	Trent Alexander-Arnold	Liverpool	1
DF	Virgil van Dijk	Liverpool	1
DF	Aymeric Laporte	Manchester City	1
DF	Andy Robertson	Liverpool	1
MF	Bernardo Silva	Manchester City	1
MF	Fernandinho	Manchester City	1
MF	Paul Pogba	Manchester United	1
FW	Raheem Sterling	Manchester City	1
FW	Sergio Agüero †	Manchester City	2
FW	Sadio Mané †	Liverpool	2

==== Championship ====
Pos.	Player	Club	App.
GK	Darren Randolph	Middlesbrough	1
DF	Max Aarons	Norwich City	1
DF	Pontus Jansson	Leeds United	1
DF	Liam Cooper	Leeds United	1
DF	Jamal Lewis	Norwich City	1
MF	Jack Grealish	Aston Villa	1
MF	Oliver Norwood	Sheffield United	1
MF	Pablo Hernández	Leeds United	1
FW	Tammy Abraham	Aston Villa	1
FW	Teemu Pukki	Norwich City	1
FW	Billy Sharp	Sheffield United	1

==== League One ====
Pos.	Player	Club	App.
GK	Adam Davies	Barnsley	1
DF	Dimitri Cavaré	Barnsley	1
DF	Ethan Pinnock	Barnsley	1
DF	Matt Clarke	Portsmouth	1
DF	James Justin	Luton Town	1
MF	Aiden McGeady	Sunderland	1
MF	Jamal Lowe	Portsmouth	1
MF	Alex Mowatt	Barnsley	1
FW	Kieffer Moore	Barnsley	1
FW	James Collins	Luton Town	1
FW	John Marquis	Doncaster Rovers	2

==== League Two ====
Pos.	Player	Club	App.
GK	Joe Murphy	Bury	1
DF	Neal Eardley	Lincoln City	1
DF	Jason Shackell	Lincoln City	1
DF	Krystian Pearce	Mansfield Town	1
DF	Harry Toffolo	Lincoln City	1
MF	Reece Brown	Forest Green Rovers	1
MF	Danny Mayor ¤	Bury	2
MF	Jay O'Shea	Bury	1
FW	Tyler Walker	Mansfield Town	1
FW	James Norwood	Tranmere Rovers	1
FW	John Akinde	Lincoln City	1

==== FA WSL ====
Pos.	Player	Club	App.
GK	Sophie Baggaley	Bristol City	1
DF	Hannah Blundell †	Chelsea	2
DF	Aoife Mannion †	Birmingham City	2
DF	Steph Houghton †	Manchester City	2
DF	Demi Stokes †	Manchester City	2
MF	Ji So-yun †	Chelsea	4
MF	Kim Little	Arsenal	1
MF	Lia Wälti	Arsenal	1
FW	Erin Cuthbert	Chelsea	1
FW	Nikita Parris †	Manchester City	2
FW	Vivianne Miedema	Arsenal	1

== See also ==
- PFA Team of the Year (1970s)
- PFA Team of the Year (1980s)
- PFA Team of the Year (1990s)
- PFA Team of the Year (2000s)
- PFA Team of the Year (2020s)
