= Demi Stokes =

English footballer (born 1991)

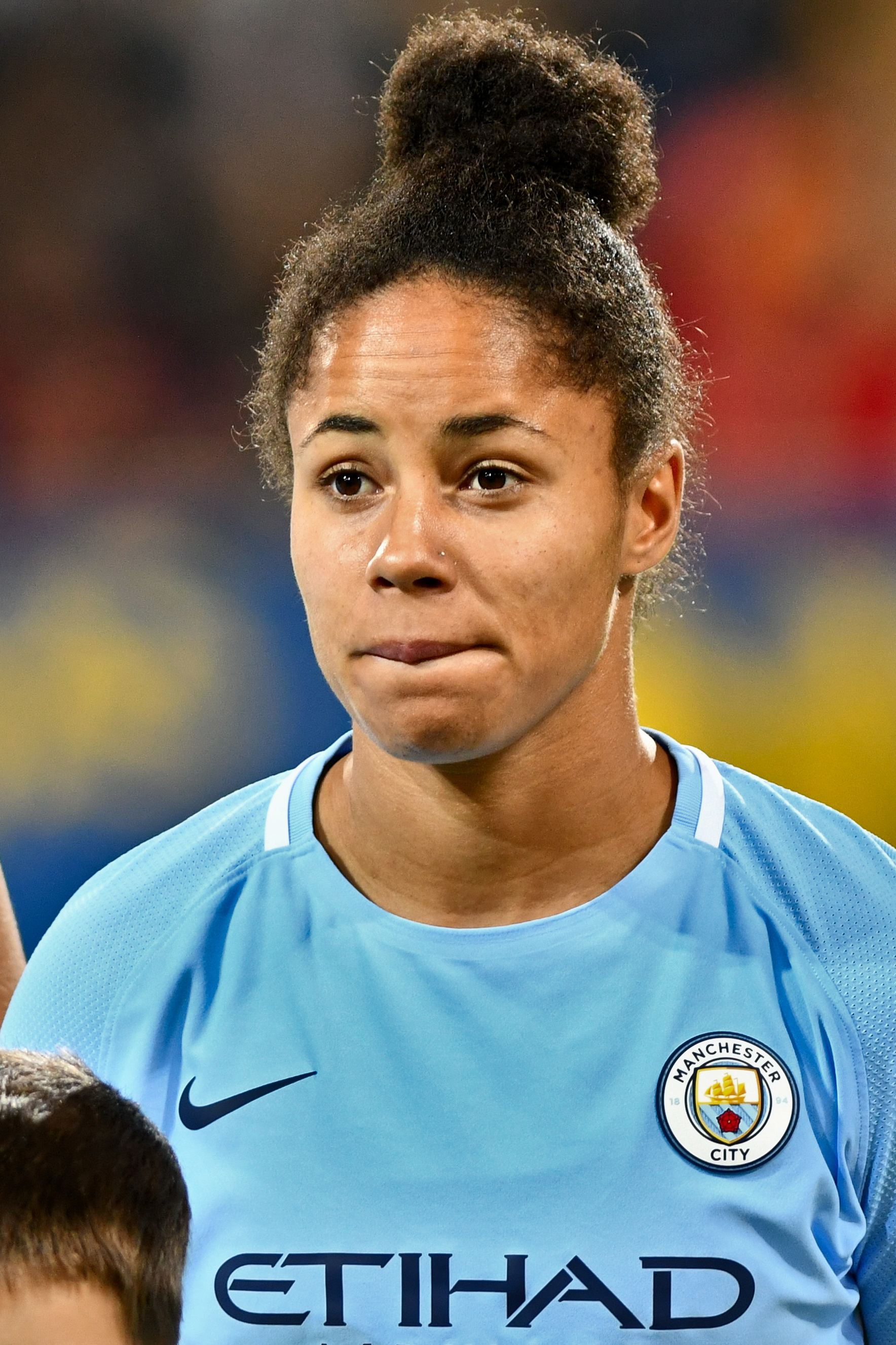
- Stokes with Manchester City in 2017

Personal information
- Full name: Demi Lee Courtney Stokes
- Date of birth: 12 December 1991 (age 34)
- Place of birth: Dudley, England
- Height: 5 ft 3 in (1.59 m)
- Position: Left-back

Team information
- Current team: Newcastle United
- Number: 3

Youth career
- –2007: Sunderland

College career
Years	Team	Apps	(Gls)
2011–2014	South Florida Bulls	73	(17)

Senior career*
Years	Team	Apps	(Gls)
2007–2011	Sunderland	42	(7)
2012	Vancouver Whitecaps	13	(0)
2015–2024	Manchester City	126	(4)
2024–	Newcastle United	39	(1)

International career^{‡}
2009–2010	England U19	15	(6)
2010	England U20	3	(0)
2010–2013	England U23	6	(1)
2014–2022	England	74	(1)
2021	Great Britain	3	(0)
Medal record
Women's football
Representing England
UEFA Women's Championship
Winner	2022 England
Representing Great Britain
Summer Universiade
Gold medal – first place	2013 Kazan	Team
- * Club domestic league appearances and goals as of 19:30, 12 June 2026 (UTC) ‡ National team caps and goals as of 19:30, 12 June 2026 (UTC)

Demi Lee Courtney Stokes (born 12 December 1991) is an English professional footballer who plays as a left-back for Women's Super League 2 club Newcastle United.

== Early life ==
Stokes was born in Dudley, a town in the West Midlands; she is often incorrectly listed online as being born in South Shields, the area her family moved to in her youth. Stokes has three brothers and a sister, and grew up in a single-parent household.

She began playing football in primary school and captained the boy's team.

Stokes attended Gateshead College so she could continue to study while playing football.

As a child, she played with Boldon CA girls' team, as did future England teammates Steph Houghton and Jill Scott; as part of the "Where Greatness Is Made" campaign, plaques honouring Stokes and Scott were installed at the club in 2022.

== Club career ==
=== Sunderland ===
Stokes joined Sunderland's youth academy as an 8-year-old and began playing in the first team at 16. She was part of the team which won the 2008–09 FA Women's Premier League Northern Division and came second in the 2009 FA Women's Cup, losing the final 2–1 to Arsenal.

During her time at Sunderland, she played alongside future international teammates Lucy Bronze, Jordan Nobbs, and Lucy Staniforth.

=== North American years ===
In 2011, Stokes accepted a four-year scholarship with the University of South Florida.

In 2012, she played 13 games for the Vancouver Whitecaps in the pro-am W-League.

=== Manchester City ===
In January 2015, Stokes signed a three-year contract with Women's Super League club Manchester City. Stokes won a domestic double (the league title and Continental Cup) during her first full season at City.

In May 2017, Stokes started in the final of the Women's FA Cup as City won the title for the first time in the club's history.

In mid-2018, Stokes suffered a hip injury which prevented her from playing for eight months. She returned to the team as City secured their second domestic double, winning both the FA Cup and the Continental Cup. Stokes won her third FA Cup with the club in November 2020 in a behind-closed-doors final delayed by over six months due to the COVID-19 pandemic.

In March 2021, Stokes signed a two-year contraction extension with City. In March 2023, she signed a contract extension for a further year.

In 2024, after 9 years at the club, it was announced that Stokes would leave Manchester City at the end of her contract on 18 May. At the time of her departure, she was the second longest serving player (behind retiring captain Steph Houghton) and one of only three players to have made over 200 appearances for the club. She won seven major honours with the club (a league title, three FA Cups, and three Continental Cups) and finished runner-up in the WSL a further seven times.

=== Newcastle United ===
On 10 July 2024, Stokes joined Women's Championship club Newcastle United. Following the departure of Amber Keegan-Stobbs, Stokes was named as Newcastle's captain ahead of the 2025-26 season.

== International career ==
=== Youth teams ===
In July 2009, Stokes was a part of the England under-19 squad who won the 2009 UEFA Women's Under-19 Championship in Belarus. In 2010, she helped England reach the final of the 2010 UEFA Women's Under-19 Championship in North Macedonia, where they lost their title to France. Later that summer, Stokes started two of England's three games at the 2010 FIFA U-20 Women's World Cup in Germany.

In July 2013 Stokes captained Great Britain to a gold medal in the 2013 Summer Universiade in Kazan, Russia.

=== Senior team ===
Newly appointed England coach Mark Sampson included Stokes in a 30-player squad for an annual training camp in La Manga. She made her senior debut during a 1–1 draw to Norway, starting at left back. In April 2014 she scored in England's 9–0 victory over Montenegro.

Stokes was not included in England's squad for the 2015 FIFA Women's World Cup. She was restored to the squad for the subsequent UEFA Women's Euro 2017 qualifying campaign.

She represented England at the 2019 FIFA Women's World Cup. England were defeated in the semi-final by eventual champions the United States, and lost the third place play off to Sweden.

On 27 May 2021 it was announced that Stokes had been selected in the Great Britain women's Olympic football team for the 2020 Olympics.

In June 2022, Stokes was included in the England squad which won the UEFA Women's Euro 2022.

Stokes was allotted 183 when the FA announced their legacy numbers scheme to honour the 50th anniversary of England’s inaugural international.

== Personal life ==
Stokes is of Jamaican descent through her father.

She is openly gay. She became engaged to her partner, Katie, during the UK's COVID-19 lockdown.

In May 2022, shortly before her participation in and eventual victory at the Women's Euro, Stokes and her partner became parents. Their son was born six weeks premature.

== Career statistics ==
=== Club ===
As of match played 2 May 2026

Appearances and goals by club, season and competition
Club	Season	League			FA Cup		League Cup		Continental		Total	
Club	Season	Division	Apps	Goals	Apps	Goals	Apps	Goals	Apps	Goals	Apps	Goals
Sunderland	2007–08	WPLR	8	0	0	0	—		—		8	0
Sunderland	2008–09	WPLR	13	0	2	0	—		—		15	0
Sunderland	2009–10	WPLN	21	3	2	1	—		—		23	4
Sunderland	2010–11	WPLN	17	7	2	0	—		—		19	7
Sunderland	Total		59	10	6	1	0	0	0	0	65	11
Vancouver Whitecaps	2012	USL W-League	13	0	—		—		—		13	0
Vancouver Whitecaps	Total		13	0	0	0	0	0	0	0	13	0
Manchester City	2015	Women's Super League	14	0	3	0	5	0	0	0	22	0
Manchester City	2016	Women's Super League	16	2	3	0	4	0	0	0	23	2
Manchester City	2017	Women's Super League	7	0	—		0	0	8	0	15	0
Manchester City	2017–18	Women's Super League	15	0	4	0	4	0	8	2	31	2
Manchester City	2018–19	Women's Super League	11	1	4	0	2	0	0	0	17	1
Manchester City	2019–20	Women's Super League	14	0	2	0	3	0	4	0	23	0
Manchester City	2020–21	Women's Super League	10	0	2	0	1	0	2	0	15	0
Manchester City	2021–22	Women's Super League	19	1	5	0	4	0	2	0	30	1
Manchester City	2022–23	Women's Super League	3	0	1	0	3	0	2	0	9	0
Manchester City	2023–24	Women's Super League	4	0	0	0	1	0	—		5	0
Manchester City	Total		126	4	24	0	27	0	26	2	203	6
Newcastle United	2024–25	Women's Championship	20	1	2	0	3	1	—		25	2
Newcastle United	2025–26	Women's Super League 2	19	0	1	0	3	0	—		23	0
Newcastle United	Total		39	1	3	0	6	1	0	0	48	2
Career total			237	15	33	1	33	1	26	0	329	19

=== International ===
As of match played 12 October 2022

Year	England		Great Britain	
Year	Apps	Goals	Apps	Goals
2014	12	1	-	
2015	8	0	-	
2016	9	0	-	
2017	16	0	-	
2018	4	0	-	
2019	8	0	-	
2020	1	0	-	
2021	6	0	3	0
2022	10	0	-	
Total	74	1	3	0

Scores and results list England's goal tally first.

Goal	Date	Venue	Opponent	Score	Result	Competition
1.	5 April 2014	Falmer Stadium, Brighton and Hove, England	Montenegro	7–0	9–0	World Cup 2015 qualification

== Honours ==
Sunderland

- FA Cup runner-up: 2008-09

Manchester City

- FA WSL Cup: 2016, 2018–19, 2021–22
- FA WSL: 2016
- FA Cup: 2016–17, 2018–19, 2019–20

England

- UEFA Women's Championship: 2022
- SheBelieves Cup: 2019
- Arnold Clark Cup: 2022

Individual

- PFA WSL Team of the Year: 2018, 2019
- Freedom of the City of London (announced 1 August 2022)

== See also ==
- List of England women's international footballers
- List of Manchester City W.F.C. players
- List of Vancouver Whitecaps Women players
- FA WSL records and statistics
