= 2011–12 FA Women's Premier League Cup =

Tournament details
- Country: England

Final positions
- Champions: Sunderland
- Runners-up: Leeds United

The 2011–12 FA Women's Premier League Cup was the 21st edition of the FA Women's Premier League Cup, a cup tournament for teams both levels of the Women's Premier League, the National Division and the Northern and Southern Divisions, the second and third levels of English women's football respectively. The cup was won by National Division side Sunderland after defeating Leeds United 2-1 at Sixfields Stadium, Northampton. In the same season, Sunderland also won the Women's Premier League National Division title, beating Leeds United to the title by just a single point, to complete a cup and league double.

== Group stage ==
=== Group 1 ===
Pos	Team	Pld	W	D	L	GF	GA	GD	Pts	Qualification	MCI	BLB	PNE	ROC
1	Manchester City	3	3	0	0	14	2	+12	9	Advanced to Knockout phase	—	7–0	–	H–W
2	Blackburn Rovers	3	2	0	1	9	8	+1	6	Advanced to Knockout phase	–	—	–	3–0
3	Preston North End	3	1	0	2	7	12	−5	3		2–4	1–6	—	–
4	Rochdale	3	0	0	3	2	10	−8	0		–	–	2–4	—

Source: thefa.com

29 January 2012	Preston North End (NO)	2–4	Manchester City (NO)
14:00	Bailey 43'; Watson 58'	Report	Johnston; McManus; Bayley

29 January 2012	Blackburn Rovers (NO)	3–0	Rochdale (NO)
14:00	Forster; Twohig; Turner	Report

15 February 2012	Rochdale (NO)	2–4	Preston North End (NO)
20:00	Hastie	Report	Carroll 10'; Watson 14'; Forshaw 44', 63'

29 February 2012	Preston North End (NO)	1–6	Blackburn Rovers (NO)
20:00	Booth 69'	Report	Sheen 17'; Ince 49'; Forster 56', 59'; Anderton 58'; Savage 72'

13 March 2012	Manchester City (NO)	7–0	Blackburn Rovers (NO)
19:45	Goodwin; Johnston; Lee; Savage; Young; Jordan	Report

20 March 2012	Manchester City (NO)	w/o	Rochdale (NO)

=== Group 2 ===
Pos	Team	Pld	W	D	L	GF	GA	GD	Pts	Qualification	BAR	WHU	COL	TOT	WAT
1	Barnet	4	3	0	1	8	2	+6	9	Advanced to Knockout phase	—	1–2	–	–	1–0
2	West Ham United	4	2	1	1	6	5	+1	7	Advanced to Knockout phase	–	—	–	2–0	1–3
3	Colchester United	4	1	2	1	5	7	−2	5		0–3	1–1	—	–	–
4	Tottenham Hotspur	4	1	1	2	4	8	−4	4		0–3	–	2–2	—	–
5	Watford	4	1	0	3	5	6	−1	3		–	–	1–2	1–2	—

Source: thefa.com

29 January 2012	Tottenham Hotspur (S)	0–3	Barnet (NA)
14:00		Report	Murphy 31'; Williams 52', 74'	Attendance: 50

29 January 2012	Colchester United (S)	1–1	West Ham United (S)
14:00	Doyle 78'	Report	Duxbury 28'

21 February 2012	Barnet (NA)	1–0	Watford (NA)
19:45	Murphy 73'	Report

29 February 2012	West Ham United (S)	2–0	Tottenham Hotspur (S)
19:45	Merritt 45+1'; Sullivan 68'	Report

6 March 2012	Barnet (NA)	1–2	West Ham United (S)
19:45	Prosser 20'	Report	Bowers 50'; Grafton 68'

11 March 2012	West Ham United (S)	1–3	Watford (NA)
14:00	Merritt 60'	Report	Logie 65'; Waller 75', 82'

11 March 2012	Tottenham Hotspur (S)	2–2	Colchester United (S)
14:00	Hall 46'; Martin 70'	Report	Bass 63'; Gibbs 81'

15 March 2012	Watford (NA)	1–2	Tottenham Hotspur (S)
19:45	Wiltshire 36'	Report	Thomson 43'; Sherwood 49'

18 March 2012	Watford (NA)	1–2	Colchester United (S)
14:00	Wiltshire 49'	Report	Bass 15'; Doyle 66'

20 March 2012	Colchester United (S)	0–3	Barnet (NA)
19:45		Report	Sowden 34'; Williams 80'; Prosser 83'

=== Group 3 ===
Pos	Team	Pld	W	D	L	GF	GA	GD	Pts	Qualification	POR	REA	KEY	PLY
1	Portsmouth	3	2	1	0	11	3	+8	7	Advanced to Knockout phase	—	–	–	7–0
2	Reading	3	1	2	0	6	4	+2	5	Advanced to Knockout phase	1–1	—	3–1	–
3	Keynsham Town	3	1	0	2	5	6	−1	3		2–3	–	—	2–0
4	Plymouth Argyle	3	0	1	2	2	11	−9	1		–	2–2	–	—

Source: thefa.com

29 January 2012	Reading (NA)	3–1	Keynsham Town (S)
14:00	Watts 63', 75', 77'	Report	Grant 55'

29 January 2012	Portsmouth (S)	7–0	Plymouth Argyle (S)
14:00	Cox 3'; Wilson 8', 55', 78'; Tewkesbury 18'; Rutherford 32'; Quinn 82'	Report		Attendance: 85

4 March 2012	Keynsham Town (S)	2–0	Plymouth Argyle (S)
14:00	Aldridge	Report

11 March 2012	Plymouth Argyle (S)	2–2	Reading (NA)
14:00	Knapman 54'; Mousley 59'	Report	Donnelly 10'; Palmer 86'

14 March 2012	Reading (NA)	1–1	Portsmouth (S)
19:30	Kirby	Report	Hillier 12'

18 March 2012	Keynsham Town (S)	2–3	Portsmouth (S)
14:00	Wardle 30'; Reinecke 74'	Report	Tewkesbury 60', 80'; McGee 65'

=== Group 4 ===
Pos	Team	Pld	W	D	L	GF	GA	GD	Pts	Qualification	CHA	MIL	GIL	QPR	BHA
1	Charlton Athletic	4	4	0	0	14	4	+10	12	Advanced to Knockout phase	—	3–0	–	–	6–2
2	Millwall Lionesses	4	2	1	1	5	6	−1	7	Advanced to Knockout phase	–	—	2–1	1–1	–
3	Gillingham	4	2	0	2	4	4	0	6		0–2	–	—	2–0	–
4	Queens Park Rangers	4	0	2	2	4	7	−3	2		2–3	–	–	—	1–1
5	Brighton & Hove Albion	4	0	1	3	4	10	−6	1		–	1–2	0–1	–	—

Source: thefa.com

29 January 2012	Millwall Lionesses (S)	1–1	Queens Park Rangers (S)
14:00	Gurr 50'	Report	Fogarty

29 January 2012	Charlton Athletic (NA)	6–2	Brighton & Hove Albion (S)
14:00	Bailes 8'; Bryan 62', 77', 85'; Jones 74'	Report	Senning 22'; Barton 83'

29 February 2012	Gillingham (S)	0–2	Charlton Athletic (NA)
19:30		Report	Daniels 48'; Beckett 69'

4 March 2012	Gillingham (S)	2–0	Queens Park Rangers (S)
14:00	Crinean 20'; Carlton 78'	Report

6 March 2012	Brighton & Hove Albion (S)	0–1	Gillingham (S)
19:45		Report	Crinean

7 March 2012	Queens Park Rangers (S)	2–3	Charlton Athletic (NA)
19:45	Smith 22'; Cooper 45+2'	Report	Alden 72'; Bennett 90+3'; Graham 90+9'

11 March 2012	Millwall Lionesses (S)	2–1	Gillingham (S)
14:00	Lennon 50'; Dyett 90'	Report	Jones 90'

13 March 2013	Charlton Athletic (NA)	3–0	Millwall Lionesses (S)
19:45	Bryan 29', 56'; Clifford 65'	Report

18 March 2012	Queens Park Rangers (S)	1–1	Brighton & Hove Albion (S)
14:00	Sandow 49'	Report	Barton 30'

20 March 2012	Brighton & Hove Albion (S)	1–2	Millwall Lionesses (S)
19:45	Stenning 60'	Report	Griffiths 28'; Odogun 84'

=== Group 5 ===
Pos	Team	Pld	W	D	L	GF	GA	GD	Pts	Qualification	SUN	LEE	SHE	LCI
1	Sunderland	3	2	1	0	5	1	+4	7	Advanced to Knockout phase	—	–	–	H–W
2	Leeds United	3	2	1	0	2	1	+1	7	Advanced to Knockout phase	1–1	—	–	H–W
3	Sheffield	3	1	0	2	0	5	−5	3		0–4	0–1	—	–
4	Leeds City Vixens	3	0	0	3	0	0	0	0		–	–	A–W	—

Source: thefa.com

1 March 2012	Sheffield (NO)	0–1	Leeds United (NA)
20:00		Report	Galton 37'

4 March 2012	Leeds United (NA)	1–1	Sunderland (NA)
14:00	Sharp 70'	Report	Devine 30'

11 March 2012	Leeds City Vixens (NO)	w/o	Sheffield (NO)
14:00		Report

15 March 2012	Leeds United (NA)	w/o	Leeds City Vixens (NO)
19:45		Report

15 March 2012	Sheffield (NO)	0–4	Sunderland (NA)
20:00		Report	Ramshaw 41', 65'; Gutteridge 55'; Furness 85'

20 March 2012	Sunderland (NA)	w/o	Leeds City Vixens (NO)
19:45		Report

=== Group 6 ===
Pos	Team	Pld	W	D	L	GF	GA	GD	Pts	Qualification	NOT	ROT	DER	LEI
1	Nottingham Forest	3	3	0	0	8	2	+6	9	Advanced to Knockout phase	—	5–1	1–0	–
2	Rotherham United	3	2	0	1	7	8	−1	6	Advanced to Knockout phase	–	—	5–3	–
3	Derby County	3	1	0	2	6	6	0	3		–	–	—	3–0
4	Leicester City	3	0	0	3	1	6	−5	0		1–2	0–1	–	—

Source: thefa.com

29 January 2012	Leicester City (NO)	1–2	Nottingham Forest (NA)
14:00	Hayes 17'	Report	Bell; Meade

28 February 2012	Rotherham United (NO)	5–3	Derby County (NO)
19:30	Crossman 40'; Richardson 10'; Smith 12'; Shaw 22', 80'	Report	Johnson; Kilmartin; Ward

8 March 2012	Derby County (NO)	3–0	Leicester City (NO)
19:45	Kilmartin; Newton	Report

11 March 2012	Nottingham Forest (NA)	1–0	Derby County (NO)
14:00	Bell 72'	Report

13 March 2012	Leicester City (NO)	0–1	Rotherham United (NO)
19:45		Report	Aisthorpe 15'

20 March 2012	Nottingham Forest (NA)	5–1	Rotherham United (NO)
19:45	Bell; Davies; Hughes	Report	Rutherford 13'

=== Group 7 ===
Pos	Team	Pld	W	D	L	GF	GA	GD	Pts	Qualification	COV	AST	CAR	SCA
1	Coventry City	3	2	1	0	4	2	+2	7	Advanced to Knockout phase	—	–	–	2–1
2	Aston Villa	3	2	0	1	5	3	+2	6	Advanced to Knockout phase	1–2	—	–	1–0
3	Cardiff City	3	1	1	1	3	3	0	4		0–0	1–3	—	–
4	Sporting Club Albion	3	0	0	3	1	5	−4	0		–	–	0–2	—

Source: thefa.com

29 January 2012	Sporting Club Albion (NO)	0–2	Cardiff City (NA)
14:00		Report	Lloyd 7', 53'

22 February 2012	Coventry City (NA)	2–1	Sporting Club Albion (NO)
19:45	Bartlett 84', 88'	Report	Neville 21'

8 March 2012	Aston Villa (NA)	1–2	Coventry City (NA)
19:30	Merritt 25'	Report	Formaston 21'; Hollingsworth 48'

11 March 2012	Cardiff City (NA)	0–0	Coventry City (NA)
14:00		Report

11 March 2012	Aston Villa (NA)	1–0	Sporting Club Albion (NO)
14:00	Wilkinson 30'	Report

13 March 2012	Cardiff City (NA)	1–3	Aston Villa (NA)
19:30	Atkins 55'	Report	Clarke; Griffiths; Davies	Attendance: 50

== Knockout phase ==
=== Bracket ===
First round
Aston Villa	5
Rotherham United	1
Sunderland	4
Manchester City	0
Reading	3
Blackburn Rovers	4
Portsmouth	5
Nottingham Forest	3
Millwall Lionesses	0
West Ham United	1
Coventry City	1
Barnet	0
Gillingham	0
Charlton Athletic	2
Leeds United	4
Derby County	0

Quarter-finals
Aston Villa	1
Sunderland	2
Blackburn Rovers	2
Portsmouth	1
West Ham United	1
Coventry City	2
Charlton Athletic	2
Leeds United	5

Semi-finals
Sunderland	8
Blackburn Rovers	0
Coventry City	0
Leeds United	2

Final
Sunderland	2
Leeds United	1

=== First round ===
Matches were played on the 25 March and the 1 April 2012.

25 March 2012	Portsmouth (S)	5–3	Nottingham Forest (NA)
14:00	Tewkesbury 3', 48', 56'; Wilson 19'; Rutherford 32'	Report	Connor-Iommi; Davies; Kennaugh

25 March 2012	Millwall Lionesses (S)	0–1	West Ham United (S)
14:00		Report	Merritt 41'

25 March 2012	Gillingham (S)	0–2	Charlton Athletic (NA)
14:00		Report	Graham 21'; Gibbons 62'

25 March 2012	Coventry City (NA)	1–0	Barnet (NA)
14:00	Bartlett 24'	Report

25 March 2012	Aston Villa (NA)	5–1	Rotherham United (NO)
14:00	Davies; Fellows; Umotong; Wilkinson; Griffiths	Report	Shaw 20'

1 April 2012	Sunderland (NA)	4–0	Manchester City (NO)
14:00	Mead 15', 70'; Williams 16'; McDougall 60'	Report

1 April 2012	Reading (NA)	3–4	Blackburn Rovers (NO)
14:00	Roche 53'; Kirby 75', 85'	Report	Savage 22'; Sheen 32'; Pennington 85'; Forster 88'

1 April 2012	Leeds United (NA)	4–0	Derby County (NO)
14:00	Sharp 42', 66'; Danby 60'; Huegett 72'	Report

=== Quarter-finals ===
All matches were played on the 8 April 2012

8 April 2012	West Ham United (S)	1–2	Coventry City (NA)
14:00	Blanchflower 57'	Report	Saulter 18'; Sweetman-Kirk 83'

8 April 2012	Charlton Athletic (NA)	2–5	Leeds United (NA)
14:00	Chandler 40'; Bryan 90+3'	Report	Turner 2'; Huegett 18'; Holbrook 25'; Rich 26'; Galton 57'

8 April 2012	Blackburn Rovers (NO)	2–1	Portsmouth (S)
14:00	Bennett 38'	Report	Rutherford 60'

8 April 2012	Aston Villa (NA)	1–2	Sunderland (NA)
14:00	Davies	Report	Mead 53'; Devine 65'

=== Semi-finals ===
All matches were played on the 22 April 2012.

22 April 2012	Sunderland (NA)	8–0	Blackburn Rovers (NO)
14:00	Mead 7', 57'; Ramshaw 31', 38', 90'; McDougall 37'; Chidester 65'; Williams 73'	Report

22 April 2012	Coventry City (NA)	0–2	Leeds United (NA)
14:00		Report	Rich 3'; Johnson 74'

=== Final ===
6 May 2012
14:30 BST

Sunderland	2–1	Leeds United
Gutteridge 9', 66'	Report	Huegett 90+2' (pen.)

Sixfields Stadium, Northampton
