= 2012–13 Manchester City L.F.C. season =

Manchester City Ladies
2012–13 season
- Manager: Leigh Wood
- Stadium: Manchester Regional Arena
- FA Women's Premier League National Division: 4th
- FA Cup: Fifth Round
- WPL Cup: Last 16

The 2012–13 season was Manchester City Ladies Football Club's 25th season of competitive football and its final season in the FA Women's Premier League. Despite only a fourth-placed finish, Manchester City were given a place in the expanded FA WSL the following season.

== Competitions ==
=== League table ===
Pos	Team	Pld	W	D	L	GF	GA	GD	Pts	Promotion or relegation
2	Watford (P)	18	11	5	2	32	17	+15	38	Approved for FA WSL 2
3	Leeds United (R)	18	12	2	4	32	19	+13	38	Relegation to the Northern Division
4	Manchester City (P)	18	7	4	7	32	25	+7	25	Approved for FA WSL 1
5	Coventry City (R)	18	8	1	9	25	27	−2	25	Relegation to the Southern Division
6	Aston Villa (P)	18	7	3	8	21	29	−8	24	Approved for FA WSL 2

Source: FA WPL
(P) Promoted; (R) Relegated

==== Results summary ====
Overall								Home						Away					
Pld	W	D	L	GF	GA	GD	Pts	W	D	L	GF	GA	GD	W	D	L	GF	GA	GD
18	7	4	7	32	25	+7	25	4	2	3	16	12	+4	3	2	4	16	13	+3

Last updated: 12 October 2014.
Source: WSL

==== Results by matchday ====
Matchday	1	2	3	4	5	6	7	8	9	10	11	12	13	14	15	16	17	18
Ground	A	A	H	H	H	A	A	H	H	H	H	A	A	H	A	A	A	H
Result	W	D	L	L	W	D	L	W	W	L	D	L	W	W	L	L	W	D
Position																		4

Updated to match(es) played on 15 May 2013. Source: FA WPL
A = Away; H = Home; W = Win; D = Draw; L = Loss

==== Matches ====
19 August 2012 1	Barnet	0–3	Manchester City	Barnet
14:00 BST		Report	Rudman 1', 8' (o.g.); Lee 28'	Stadium: Underhill Stadium

26 August 2012 2	Charlton Athletic	4–4	Manchester City	Thamesmead, London
14:00 BST	Stenning 44'; Gibson 50'; Shepherd 90', 90+4'	Report	Buffel; Danby; Nightingale; Shepherd	Stadium: Bayliss Avenue

9 September 2012 3	Manchester City	2–3	Portsmouth	Manchester
14:00 BST	Danby 22'; Goodwin 72'	Report	Cox 9'; Roe 62'; McGee 88'	Stadium: Manchester Regional Arena

30 September 2012 4	Manchester City	2–3	Sunderland	Manchester
14:00 BST	Lee; Savage	Report	Mead 4', 81'; Williams 62'	Stadium: Manchester Regional Arena

7 October 2012 5	Manchester City	2–1	Coventry City	Manchester
14:00 BST	Buffel; Goodwin	Report	Saulter 23'	Stadium: Manchester Regional Arena

21 October 2012 6	Watford	1–1	Manchester City	Berkhamsted
14:00 BST	Wiltshire 19'	Report	Danby	Stadium: Broadwater

28 October 2012 7	Aston Villa	1–0	Manchester City	Sutton Coldfield
14:00 BST	Wilkinson 75'	Report		Stadium: Trevor Brown Memorial Ground

11 November 2012 8	Manchester City	3–0	Leeds United	Manchester
14:00 BST	Danby; Goodwin; Young	Report		Stadium: Manchester Regional Arena

18 November 2012 9	Manchester City	1–0	Barnet	Manchester
14:00 BST	Johnston	Report		Stadium: Manchester Regional Arena

2 December 2012 10	Manchester City	1–2	Charlton Athletic	Manchester
14:00 BST	Johnston	Report	Shepherd 38'; Bryan 50'	Stadium: Manchester Regional Arena

10 February 2013 11	Manchester City	1–1	Watford	Manchester
14:00 BST	Danby; Shepherd (red card) 90+2'	Report	Wilson 45+4'	Stadium: Manchester Regional Arena

24 March 2013 12	Cardiff City	3–2	Manchester City	Cardiff
14:00 BST	Townsend 40'; Stewart 61'; Aldridge 86'	Report	Bayley; Johnston	Stadium: Cardiff Athletics Stadium

31 March 2013 13	Coventry City	0–3	Manchester City	Bedworth
14:00 BST		Report	Buffel; Johnston; Hollingsworth (o.g.)	Stadium: Miners Welfare Park

7 April 2013 14	Manchester City	3–1	Cardiff City	Manchester
14:00 BST	Johnston; McManus	Report	Atkins	Stadium: Manchester Regional Arena

21 April 2013 15	Sunderland	1–0	Manchester City	Hetton-le-Hole, Sunderland
14:00 BST	Mead 38'	Report		Stadium: Eppleton Colliery Welfare Ground

2 May 2013 16	Leeds United	2–1	Manchester City	Leeds
14:00 BST	Sheen 7'; Lee 79'	Report	Buffel 17'	Stadium: Elland Road

12 May 2013 17	Portsmouth	1–2	Manchester City	Hayling Island
14:00 BST	Tewkesbury 7'	Report	McManus; Savage	Stadium: Hayling Cottage

19 May 2013 18	Manchester City	1–1	Aston Villa	Manchester
14:00 BST	Shepherd	Report	Davies 74'	Stadium: Manchester Regional Arena

=== FA Cup ===
3 February 2013 Third Round	Manchester City	3–2	Sheffield	Manchester
14:00 BST		Report		Stadium: Manchester Regional Arena

24 February 2013 Fourth Round	Coventry City	0–1	Manchester City	Bedworth
14:00 BST		Report		Stadium: Miners Welfare Park

17 March 2013 Fifth Round	Sunderland	4–0	Manchester City	Hetton-le-Hole, Sunderland
14:00 BST	Mead 38', 51'; Williams 45'; Bannon 55'	Report		Stadium: Eppleton Colliery Welfare Ground

=== WPL Cup ===
==== Group stage ====
Pos	Team	Pld	W	D	L	GF	GA	GD	Pts	Qualification	BLB	MCI	WOL	PNE	ROC
1	Blackburn Rovers	3	2	1	0	12	1	+11	7	Advanced to Knockout phase	—	1–1	6–0	–	–
2	Manchester City	3	1	2	0	7	5	+2	5	Advanced to Knockout phase	–	—	–	2–0	–
3	Wolverhampton Wanderers	3	1	1	1	8	10	−2	4	Advanced to Knockout phase	–	4–4	—	4–0	–
4	Preston North End	3	0	0	3	0	11	−11	0		0–5	–	–	—	–
5	Rochdale	0	0	0	0	0	0	0	0	Withdrew (Note: Rochdale withdraw before playing any matches.)	–	–	–	–	—

Updated to match(es) played on 2 February 2019. Source: FA WPL: Tables and FA WPL: Matches
Rules for classification: 1) points; 2) goal difference; 3) number of goals scored.
Notes:

2 September 2012 Group stage - round 1	Manchester City	2–0	Fylde	Wythenshawe
14:00 BST	Young 20'; Savage 69'	Report		Stadium: Ericstan Stadium

23 September 2012 Group stage - round 2	Wolverhampton Wanderers	4–4	Manchester City	Castlecroft, Wolverhampton
14:00 BST	Palmer 29', 83'; Selmes 11', 56'	Report	Buffel; Farrell; Goodwin; Johnston	Stadium: Castlecroft Stadium

14 October 2012 Group stage - round 3	Blackburn Rovers	1–1	Manchester City	Radcliffe
14:00 BST	Makin 25'	Report	Young	Stadium: Stainton Park

==== Knock-out stages ====
3 March 2013 Last 16	Portsmouth	2–1	Manchester City	Havant
14:00 BST	Cox 23'; Hiller 36'	Report	Bayley 59'	Stadium: West Leigh Park

== Playing statistics ==
Appearances (Apps.) numbers are for appearances in competitive games only including sub appearances
Red card numbers denote: Numbers in parentheses represent red cards overturned for wrongful dismissal.

Player	Pos.	League			FA Cup			WPL Cup			Total		
Player	Pos.	Apps	Goal	Sent off (straight red)	Apps	Goal	Sent off (straight red)	Apps	Goal	Sent off (straight red)	Apps	Goal	Sent off (straight red)
Carly Bayley		11	1					4	1		15	2	
Sarah Buffel		15	4					2	1		17	5	
Danielle Brown	GK	11						2			13		
Sarah Danby		17	5					4			21	5	
Charlotte Farrell		2						2	1		4	1	
Chelsea Flanagan		2						1			3		
Amanda Goodwin		10	3					3	1		13	4	
Nikki Harding	DF	10						1			11		
Krystle Johnston	FW	17	6					4	1		21	7	
Saffron Jordan		14						4			18		
Rebecca Lee		15	2					2			17	2	
Kelly McLellan		8						3			11		
Abbie McManus	DF	17	2					3			20	2	
Felicity Middleton		13						2			15		
Chelsea Nightingale	DF	17	1					2			19	1	
Lindsay Savage		16	2					4	1		20	3	
Elizabeth Seasman	GK	1									1		
Lynda Shepherd	MF	18	2	1				3			21	2	1
Kimberley Turner	MF	6									6		
Andrea Worrall	GK	6						1			7		
Nicola Worthington		5						3			8		
Danielle Young	FW	14	1					3	2		17	3	
Own goals			3			0			0			3	
Totals			32	1		4	0		8	0		44	1

FA Cup appearance information not presently known
