= 2011–12 Manchester City L.F.C. season =

Manchester City Ladies
2011–12 season
- Manager: Leigh Wood
- Stadium: Manchester Regional Arena
- FA Women's Premier League Northern Division: Champions
- FA Cup: Fifth Round
- WPL Cup: First Round

The 2011–12 season was Manchester City Ladies Football Club's 24th season of competitive football and its eleventh and final season in the FA Women's Premier League Northern Division before their promotion to the National Division.

== Competitions ==
=== Premier League Northern Division ===
==== League table ====
Pos	Team	Pld	W	D	L	GF	GA	GD	Pts	Promotion or relegation
1	Manchester City (C, P)	18	13	1	4	58	19	+39	40	Promoted to National Division
2	Sheffield	18	11	2	5	46	28	+18	35	
3	Leicester City	18	10	4	4	43	21	+22	34	
4	Blackburn Rovers	18	9	5	4	48	28	+20	32	
5	Derby County	18	9	5	4	44	30	+14	32	

Source: FA WPL
(C) Champions; (P) Promoted

==== Results summary ====
Overall								Home						Away					
Pld	W	D	L	GF	GA	GD	Pts	W	D	L	GF	GA	GD	W	D	L	GF	GA	GD
18	13	1	4	58	19	+39	40	7	0	2	35	11	+24	6	1	2	23	8	+15

Last updated: 3 February 2019.
Source: WSL

==== Results by matchday ====
Matchday	1	2	3	4	5	6	7	8	9	10	11	12	13	14	15	16	17	18
Ground	H	A	H	A	H	A	H	A	H	A	H	A	H	H	A	A	H	A
Result	L	L	L	W	W	W	W	D	W	W	W	W	W	W	W	W	W	L
Position																	1	1

Updated to match(es) played on 8 May 2012. Source: FA WPL
A = Away; H = Home; W = Win; D = Draw; L = Loss

==== Matches ====
21 August 2011 1	Manchester City	1–3	Blackburn Rovers	Manchester
14:00 BST	Savage 33'	Report	Forster 31'; Sheen 39', 56'	Stadium: Manchester Regional Arena

28 August 2011 2	Rochdale	1–0	Manchester City	Chadderton
14:00 BST	Shirley	Report		Stadium: Andrew Street

4 September 2011 3	Manchester City	1–2	Leicester City	Manchester
14:00 BST	Goodwin	Report	Hayes 45'; Lowder 71'	Stadium: Manchester Regional Arena

11 September 2011 4	Derby County	1–3	Manchester City	Derby
14:00 BST	Steadman 2'	Report	Johnston 10'; Buffel 75'; Lee 82'	Stadium: Asterdale Bowl Ground

25 September 2011 5	Manchester City	5–3	Sheffield	Manchester
14:00 BST	Buffel 7'; Jordan 8'; Makin 21', 29', 64'	Report	Cook 20', 61'; Gilliatt 33'	Stadium: Manchester Regional Arena

2 October 2011 6	Rotherham United	0–4	Manchester City	Rotherham
14:00 BST		Report	Savage 43'; Buffel 61', 86'; McManus 77'	Stadium: Roundwood Sports Complex

9 October 2011 7	Manchester City	11–0	Leeds City Vixens	Manchester
14:00 BST	Johnston 10', 17', 24', 44'; Buffel 34', 66', 74'; Young 55', 83'; McLellan 70'; Jordan 85'	Report		Stadium: Manchester Regional Arena

16 October 2011 8	Sporting Club Albion	1–1	Manchester City	Halesowen
14:00 BST	Baptiste	Report	Goodwin 69'	Stadium: The Grove

30 October 2011 9	Manchester City	2–0	Rochdale	Manchester
14:00 BST	Johnston; Savage	Report		Stadium: Manchester Regional Arena

6 November 2011 10	Leicester City	0–3	Manchester City	Hinckley
14:00 BST		Report	Grocott; Savage; Young	Stadium: Greene King Stadium

13 November 2011 11	Manchester City	7–1	Derby County	Manchester
14:00 BST	Buffel; Farrell; Johnston; Young	Report	Lawson	Stadium: Manchester Regional Arena

27 November 2011 12	Sheffield	1–2	Manchester City	Dronfield
14:00 BST	da Silva 58'	Report	Goodwin; McLellan	Stadium: Home of Football

4 December 2011 13	Manchester City	4–0	Rotherham United	Manchester
14:00 BST	Buffel; Grocott; Lee	Report		Stadium: Manchester Regional Arena

4 March 2012 14	Manchester City	3–2	Preston North End	Manchester
14:00 BST	Johnston; Young, (red card); Carroll 64' (o.g.)	Report	Bailey 26'; Ball 45'; Carroll (red card)	Stadium: Manchester Regional Arena

18 March 2012 15	Leeds City Vixens	1–5	Manchester City	Leeds
14:00 BST	Bayley; Goodwin; McLellan; Young	Report	Riolfo 32'	Stadium: Bracken Edge; Attendance: 20

15 April 2012 16	Preston North End	0–4	Manchester City	Bamber Bridge
14:00 BST		Report	Bayley; Buffel; Johnston	Stadium: Sir Tom Finney Stadium

22 April 2012 17	Manchester City	1–0	Sporting Club Albion	Manchester
14:00 BST	Buffel 84'	Report		Stadium: Manchester Regional Arena

8 May 2012 18	Blackburn Rovers	3–1	Manchester City	Radcliffe
14:00 BST	Forster 78', 80'; Donoghue 90'	Report	Buffel	Stadium: Stainton Park

=== FA Cup ===
8 January 2012 Second Round	Manchester City	9–1	Leeds City Vixens	Manchester
				Stadium: Manchester Regional Arena

12 February 2012 Third Round	Manchester City	4–1	Oxford United	Manchester
				Stadium: Manchester Regional Arena

26 February 2012 Fourth Round	Enfield Town	0–2	Manchester City	Enfield, London
				Stadium: Queen Elizabeth II Stadium, Enfield

11 March 2012 Fifth Round	Everton	1–5	Manchester City	Cheadle
				Stadium: Park Road Stadium

=== WPL Cup ===
==== Group stage ====
Pos	Team	Pld	W	D	L	GF	GA	GD	Pts	Qualification	MCI	BLB	PNE	ROC
1	Manchester City	3	3	0	0	14	2	+12	9	Advanced to Knockout phase	—	7–0	–	H–W
2	Blackburn Rovers	3	2	0	1	9	8	+1	6	Advanced to Knockout phase	–	—	–	3–0
3	Preston North End	3	1	0	2	7	12	−5	3		2–4	1–6	—	–
4	Rochdale	3	0	0	3	2	10	−8	0		–	–	2–4	—

Source: thefa.com

29 January 2012 Group stage - round 1	Preston North End	2–4	Manchester City	Bamber Bridge
14:00 BST	Bailey 43'; Watson 48'	Report	Johnston; McManus; Bayley	Stadium: Sir Tom Finney Stadium

13 March 2012 Group stage - round 2	Manchester City	7–0	Blackburn Rovers	Manchester
14:00 BST	Goodwin; Johnston; Jordan; Lee; Savage; Young	Report		Stadium: Manchester Regional Arena

20 March 2012 Group stage - round 3	Manchester City	walkover (3–0)	Rochdale	Manchester
14:00 BST		Report		Stadium: Manchester Regional Arena

==== Knock-out stages ====
1 April 2012 First Round	Sunderland	4–0	Manchester City	Hetton-le-Hole, Sunderland
14:00 BST	Mead 15', 70'; Williams 16'; McDougall 60'	Report		Stadium: Park View Stadium
