= 2012–13 FA Women's Premier League Cup =

Tournament details
- Country: England

Final positions
- Champions: Aston Villa
- Runners-up: Leeds United

The 2012–13 FA Women's Premier League Cup is the 22nd edition of the FA Women's Premier League Cup, the cup tournament for teams both levels of the Women's Premier League, the National Division and the Northern and Southern Divisions. Thirty teams were initially drawn into six groups (six groups of five teams) with the first games of the season being played on September 9, 2012.

== Group stage ==
The draw was held at Wembley Stadium in early August 2012. Six groups of five teams were drawn. Rochdale in group 4 withdraw before playing a match. The teams finishing winners and runners-up of each group, along with the best four third-placed teams (based on the highest number of points, superior goal difference, higher number of goals scored in these matches, drawing of lots) progressed.

=== Group 1 ===
| Pos | Team | Pld | W | D | L | GF | GA | GD | Pts | Qualification | CAR | POR | YEO | REA | QPR |
|---|---|---|---|---|---|---|---|---|---|---|---|---|---|---|---|
| 1 | Cardiff City | 4 | 3 | 1 | 0 | 9 | 5 | +4 | 10 | Advanced to Knockout phase | — | 3–2 | 0–0 | – | 3–1 |
| 2 | Portsmouth | 4 | 2 | 0 | 2 | 8 | 8 | 0 | 6 | Advanced to Knockout phase | – | — | 3–2 | 1–2 | – |
| 3 | Yeovil Town | 4 | 1 | 2 | 1 | 5 | 5 | 0 | 5 | Advanced to Knockout phase | – | – | — | 2–1 | – |
| 4 | Reading | 4 | 1 | 1 | 2 | 6 | 7 | −1 | 4 | | 2–3 | – | – | — | 1–1 |
| 5 | Queens Park Rangers | 4 | 0 | 2 | 2 | 4 | 7 | −3 | 2 | | – | 1–2 | 1–1 | – | — |

Source: FA WPL: Tables and FA WPL: Matches

| 2 September 2012 | Cardiff City (NA) | 0–0 | Yeovil Town (S) |
| 14:00 | | Report |

| 2 September 2012 | Portsmouth (NA) | 1–2 | Reading (S) |
| 14:00 | Hillier | Report | Kirby 21', 37' |

| 23 September 2012 | Reading (S) | 2–3 | Cardiff City (NA) |
| 14:00 | Palmer 50'; Jane 75' | Report | Lawrence 15', 35'; Aldridge 60' |

| 23 September 2012 | Queens Park Rangers (S) | 1–2 | Portsmouth (NA) |
| 14:00 | O'Leary 4' | Report | Wilson 70'; Tewkesbury 86' |

| 14 October 2012 | Cardiff City (NA) | 3–1 | Queens Park Rangers (S) |
| 14:00 | Isaac 6'; Lawrence 12'; Aldridge 72' | Report | Meadows 75' |

| 14 October 2012 | Yeovil Town (S) | 2–1 | Reading (S) |
| 14:00 | Bray | Report | Kirby 75' |

| 4 November 2012 | Cardiff City (NA) | 3–2 | Portsmouth (NA) |
| 14:00 | Stewart 50', 90+5'; Aldridge 70' | Report | McGee; Rutherford |

| 4 November 2012 | Queens Park Rangers (S) | 1–1 | Yeovil Town (S) |
| 14:00 | Giesen 90' | Report | Bray |

| 9 December 2012 | Portsmouth (NA) | 3–2 | Yeovil Town (S) |
| 14:00 | Cox 30', 55'; Tewkesbury 40' | Report | Bay; Pearson |

| 9 December 2012 | Reading (S) | 1–1 | Queens Park Rangers (S) |
| 14:00 | Kirby 56' | Report | Thomson 67' |

=== Group 2 ===
| Pos | Team | Pld | W | D | L | GF | GA | GD | Pts | Qualification | BHA | CHA | LEW | GIL | MIL |
|---|---|---|---|---|---|---|---|---|---|---|---|---|---|---|---|
| 1 | Brighton & Hove Albion | 4 | 3 | 0 | 1 | 14 | 9 | +5 | 9 | Advanced to Knockout phase | — | – | 5–2 | 3–2 | – |
| 2 | Charlton Athletic | 4 | 3 | 0 | 1 | 12 | 9 | +3 | 9 | Advanced to Knockout phase | 5–2 | — | 0–5 | – | – |
| 3 | Lewes | 4 | 2 | 0 | 2 | 11 | 10 | +1 | 6 | Advanced to Knockout phase | – | – | — | 2–4 | 2–1 |
| 4 | Gillingham | 4 | 1 | 0 | 3 | 9 | 12 | −3 | 3 | | – | 1–4 | – | — | 2–3 |
| 5 | Millwall Lionesses | 4 | 1 | 0 | 3 | 5 | 11 | −6 | 3 | | 0–4 | 1–3 | – | – | — |

Source: FA WPL: Tables and FA WPL: Matches

| 2 September 2012 | Gillingham (S) | 1–4 | Charlton Athletic (NA) |
| 14:00 | Massey 38' | Report | Shepherd 25', 44'; Stenning 49'; Graham 55' |

| 2 September 2012 | Lewes (S) | 2–1 | Millwall Lionesses (S) |
| 14:00 | Cole 25'; Veiga 50' | Report | Igbavboia 40' | Attendance: 86 |

| 23 September 2012 | Brighton & Hove Albion (S) | 5–2 | Lewes (S) |
| 14:00 | Rabson 16'; Stenning 19', 26'; Waine 75'; Found 79' | Report | Bridges 40'; Cole 70' |

| 23 September 2012 | Gillingham (S) | 2–3 | Millwall Lionesses (S) |
| 14:00 | Gurr; Phillips | Report | Whitter 47', 51'; Igbavboia 56' |

| 14 October 2012 | Charlton Athletic (NA) | 5–2 | Brighton & Hove Albion (S) |
| 14:00 | Boyer 34'; Graham 42', 62'; Shepherd 45', 78' | Report | Stenning 39'; Agg 52' |

| 14 October 2012 | Lewes (S) | 2–4 | Gillingham (S) |
| 14:00 | Soksa-Marques 12'; Trafford 40' | Report | Ashton-Jones; Gurr; Massey; Pepper |

| 4 November 2012 | Brighton & Hove Albion (S) | 3–2 | Gillingham (S) |
| 14:00 | O'Hagan 13'; Barton 52'; Rabson 72' | Report | Cooper; Keogh |

| 18 November 2012 | Millwall Lionesses (S) | 1–3 | Charlton Athletic (NA) |
| 14:00 | Griffiths 34' | Report | Jones 44'; Shepherd 77', 86' |

| 25 November 2012 | Millwall Lionesses (S) | 0–4 | Brighton & Hove Albion (S) |
| 14:00 | | Report | Barton 60'; Stenning 71', 90'; O'Hagan 81' |

| 9 December 2012 | Charlton Athletic (NA) | 0–5 | Lewes (S) |
| 14:00 | | Report | Trafford 20', 35'; Chiumento 27'; Cole 70'; Bennett 80' |

=== Group 3 ===
| Pos | Team | Pld | W | D | L | GF | GA | GD | Pts | Qualification | COV | AST | SCA | DER | LEI |
|---|---|---|---|---|---|---|---|---|---|---|---|---|---|---|---|
| 1 | Coventry City | 4 | 4 | 0 | 0 | 9 | 1 | +8 | 12 | Advanced to Knockout phase | — | – | – | 2–0 | 3–0 |
| 2 | Aston Villa | 4 | 3 | 0 | 1 | 9 | 3 | +6 | 9 | Advanced to Knockout phase | 1–3 | — | 1–0 | – | – |
| 3 | Sporting Club Albion | 4 | 1 | 0 | 3 | 10 | 10 | 0 | 3 | | 0–1 | – | — | – | 5–1 |
| 4 | Derby County | 4 | 1 | 0 | 3 | 10 | 15 | −5 | 3 | | – | 0–4 | 7–5 | — | – |
| 5 | Leicester City | 4 | 1 | 0 | 3 | 5 | 14 | −9 | 3 | | – | 0–3 | – | 4–3 | — |

Source: FA WPL: Tables and FA WPL: Matches

| 2 September 2012 | Derby County (NO) | 0–4 | Aston Villa (NA) |
| 14:00 | | Report | Wilkinson 10', 60', 75'; Davies 35' |

| 2 September 2012 | Sporting Club Albion (NO) | 0–1 | Coventry City (NA) |
| 14:00 | | Report | Edwards 22' |

| 23 September 2012 | Coventry City (NA) | 3–0 | Leicester City (NO) |
| 14:00 | Dermody 37'; Barber 69'; Edwards 72' | Report |

| 23 September 2012 | Derby County (NO) | 7–5 | Sporting Club Albion (NO) |
| 14:00 | Cresswell; Griffiths; Newton; Ward | Report | James; Neville; Owen |

| 14 October 2012 | Aston Villa (NA) | 1–3 | Coventry City (NA) |
| 14:00 | Wilkinson 90' | Report | Toussaint 51'; Sweetman-Kirk 60'; Simpkins 89' |

| 14 October 2012 | Sporting Club Albion (NO) | 5–1 | Leicester City (NO) |
| 14:00 | James 16', 33'; Darby 28'; Fellows 69'; Neville 80' | Report | Farrow 77' |

| 4 November 2012 | Coventry City (NA) | 2–0 | Derby County (NO) |
| 14:00 | Dermody; Simpkins | Report |

| 4 November 2012 | Leicester City (NO) | 0–3 | Aston Villa (NA) |
| 14:00 | | Report | Stringer 14', 42'; Clarke 62' |

| 9 December 2012 | Aston Villa (NA) | 1–0 | Sporting Club Albion (NO) |
| 14:00 | Follis 27' | Report |

| 9 December 2012 | Leicester City (NO) | 4–3 | Derby County (NO) |
| 14:00 | Lowder 20', 63'; Farrow 36'; Hayes 40' | Report | Goal |

=== Group 4 ===
| Pos | Team | Pld | W | D | L | GF | GA | GD | Pts | Qualification | BLB | MCI | WOL | PNE | ROC |
|---|---|---|---|---|---|---|---|---|---|---|---|---|---|---|---|
| 1 | Blackburn Rovers | 3 | 2 | 1 | 0 | 12 | 1 | +11 | 7 | Advanced to Knockout phase | — | 1–1 | 6–0 | – | – |
| 2 | Manchester City | 3 | 1 | 2 | 0 | 7 | 5 | +2 | 5 | Advanced to Knockout phase | – | — | – | 2–0 | – |
| 3 | Wolverhampton Wanderers | 3 | 1 | 1 | 1 | 8 | 10 | −2 | 4 | Advanced to Knockout phase | – | 4–4 | — | 4–0 | – |
| 4 | Preston North End | 3 | 0 | 0 | 3 | 0 | 11 | −11 | 0 | | 0–5 | – | – | — | – |
| 5 | Rochdale | 0 | 0 | 0 | 0 | 0 | 0 | 0 | 0 | Withdrew (Note: Rochdale withdraw before playing any matches.) | – | – | – | – | — |

Updated to match(es) played on 2 February 2019. Source: FA WPL: Tables and FA WPL: Matches
Rules for classification: 1) points; 2) goal difference; 3) number of goals scored.
Notes:

| 2 September 2012 | Blackburn Rovers (NO) | 6–0 | Wolverhampton Wanderers (NO) |
| 14:00 | Forster 12'; Marsh 52'; Forster 57'; Anderton 67', 72', 85' | Report |

| 2 September 2012 | Manchester City (NA) | 2–0 | Preston North End (NO) |
| 14:00 | Young 20'; Savage 69' | Report |

| 23 September 2012 | Preston North End (NO) | 0–5 | Blackburn Rovers (NO) |
| 14:00 | | Report | Makin 22'; Donoghue 43', 51'; Forster 80', 90' |

| 23 September 2012 | Wolverhampton Wanderers (NO) | 4–4 | Manchester City (NA) |
| 14:00 | Selmes 11', 56'; Palmer 29', 83' | Report | Buffel; Farell; Goodwin; Johnston |

| 14 October 2012 | Blackburn Rovers (NO) | 1–1 | Manchester City (NA) |
| 14:00 | Makin 25' | Report | Young |

| 14 October 2012 | Wolverhampton Wanderers (NO) | 4–0 | Preston North End (NO) |
| 14:00 | Selmes | Report |

=== Group 5 ===
| Pos | Team | Pld | W | D | L | GF | GA | GD | Pts | Qualification | WAT | BAR | WHU | TOT | COL |
|---|---|---|---|---|---|---|---|---|---|---|---|---|---|---|---|
| 1 | Watford | 4 | 3 | 1 | 0 | 11 | 3 | +8 | 10 | Advanced to Knockout phase | — | – | 3–3 | – | 5–0 |
| 2 | Barnet | 4 | 3 | 0 | 1 | 11 | 2 | +9 | 9 | Advanced to Knockout phase | 0–1 | — | – | – | 6–0 |
| 3 | West Ham United | 4 | 0 | 3 | 1 | 6 | 9 | −3 | 3 | | – | 0–3 | — | 1–1 | – |
| 4 | Tottenham Hotspur | 3 | 0 | 1 | 2 | 2 | 5 | −3 | 1 (Note: Tottenham vs Colchester was postponed on the last matchday and not replayed, as no team would be able to finish as best third-place finishers.) | | 0–2 | 1–2 | – | — | – |
| 5 | Colchester United | 3 | 0 | 1 | 2 | 2 | 13 | −11 | 1 | | – | – | 2–2 | V–V | — |

Source: FA WPL: Tables and FA WPL: Matches
Notes:

| 2 September 2012 | Barnet (NA) | 6–0 | Colchester United (S) |
| 14:00 | Boardman 10', 40'; Kikomeko 19', 85'; Williams 42', 61' | Report |

| 3 September 2012 | West Ham United (S) | 1–1 | Tottenham Hotspur (S) |
| 19:45 | Little 75' | Report | Batptiste |

| 23 September 2012 | Tottenham Hotspur (S) | 1–2 | Barnet (NA) |
| 14:00 | O'Halloran 85' | Report | Kikomeko 65'; Boardman 67' |

| 23 September 2012 | Watford (NA) | 3–3 | West Ham United (S) |
| 14:00 | Garcia 5'; Wilson 7'; Hector 87' | Report | Merritt 4', 62'; Morgan 74' |

| 14 October 2012 | Watford (NA) | 5–0 | Colchester United (S) |
| 14:00 | Wiltshire 45', 72'; Wilson 64', 81'; Horwood 86' | Report |

| 14 October 2012 | West Ham United (S) | 0–3 | Barnet (NA) |
| 14:00 | | Report | Murphy 8'; Lance 41'; Boardman 67' |

| 11 November 2012 | Colchester United (S) | 2–2 | West Ham United (S) |
| 14:00 | Doyle 49'; Doo 79' | Report | Lipley-Hinton 30'; Rowland 85' |

| 11 November 2012 | Tottenham Hotspur (S) | 0–2 | Watford (NA) |
| 14:00 | | Report | Beckett 81'; Hector 89' |

| 25 November 2012 | Barnet (NA) | 0–1 | Watford (NA) |
| 14:00 | | Report | Rowell 38' |

| 9 December 2012 | Colchester United (S) | V–V | Tottenham Hotspur (S) |
| 14:00 | | Report |

=== Group 6 ===
| Pos | Team | Pld | W | D | L | GF | GA | GD | Pts | Qualification | LEE | SUN | SHE | NOT | NEW |
|---|---|---|---|---|---|---|---|---|---|---|---|---|---|---|---|
| 1 | Leeds United | 4 | 3 | 1 | 0 | 13 | 4 | +9 | 10 | Advanced to Knockout phase | — | 2–2 | – | 2–1 | – |
| 2 | Sunderland | 4 | 2 | 2 | 0 | 11 | 6 | +5 | 8 | Advanced to Knockout phase | – | — | 4–1 | – | 3–1 |
| 3 | Sheffield | 4 | 2 | 0 | 2 | 10 | 13 | −3 | 6 | Advanced to Knockout phase | 1–8 | – | — | – | 6–1 |
| 4 | Nottingham Forest | 4 | 1 | 1 | 2 | 6 | 7 | −1 | 4 | | – | 2–2 | 0–2 | — | – |
| 5 | Newcastle United | 4 | 0 | 0 | 4 | 3 | 13 | −10 | 0 | | 0–1 | – | – | 1–3 | — |

Source: FA WPL: Tables and FA WPL: Matches

| 2 September 2012 | Leeds United (NA) | 2–1 | Nottingham Forest (NO) |
| 14:00 | Holbrook 45+1'; Sheen 68' | Report | Whelan 20' |

| 2 September 2012 | Sunderland (NA) | 4–1 | Sheffield (NO) |
| 14:00 | Furness 3'; Mead 5', 9'; Gutteridge 65' | Report | Goal |

| 23 September 2012 | Newcastle United (NO) | 1–3 | Nottingham Forest (NO) |
| 14:00 | Potts 29' | Report | Howard 68'; Whelan 80', 90' |

| 23 September 2012 | Sheffield (NO) | 1–8 | Leeds United (NA) |
| 14:00 | Johnson 47' | Report | Sheen 2', 16'; Sykes 5', 77', 82', 90+3'; Huegett 10'; Lee 65' |

| 14 October 2012 | Sunderland (NA) | 3–1 | Newcastle United (NO) |
| 14:00 | Bannon 14', 24'; Williams 27' | Report | Goal |

| 14 October 2012 | Nottingham Forest (NO) | 0–2 | Sheffield (NO) |
| 14:00 | | Report | Ward 14'; Michalska 81' |

| 4 November 2012 | Leeds United (NA) | 2–2 | Sunderland (NA) |
| 14:00 | Huegett 38'; Lee 53' | Report | Mead 24', 60' |

| 4 November 2012 | Sheffield (NO) | 6–1 | Newcastle United (NO) |
| 14:00 | Gilliatt 11'; Giampalma 33'; Ward 50', 53', 58'; Davies 83' | Report | Collinson |

| 9 December 2012 | Nottingham Forest (NO) | 2–2 | Sunderland (NA) |
| 14:00 | Meade 50'; Hughes 84' | Report | Ramshaw 38', 58' |

| 9 December 2012 | Newcastle United (S) | 0–1 | Leeds United (NA) |
| 14:00 | | Report | Holbrook 60' |

== Knockout phase ==
=== Bracket ===
Last 16
Sunderland | 7
Sheffield | 2
Cardiff City | 2
Brighton & Hove Albion | 0
Yeovil Town | 0
Leeds United | 1
Watford | 0
Charlton Athletic | 1
Wolverhampton Wanderers | 0
Blackburn Rovers | 2
Coventry City | 0
Aston Villa | 3
Portsmouth | 2
Manchester City | 1
Barnet | 2
Lewes | 1

Quarter-finals
Sunderland | 2
Cardiff City | 0
Leeds United | 3
Charlton Athletic | 2
Blackburn Rovers | 1 (5)
Aston Villa (p) | 1 (6)
Portsmouth | 2
Barnet | 1

Semi-finals
Sunderland | 1
Leeds United | 4
Aston Villa | 2
Portsmouth | 1

Final
Leeds United | 0 (4)
Aston Villa (p) | 0 (5)

Drawn early December 2012.

=== Last 16 ===
| 13 January 2013 | Yeovil Town (S) | 0–1 | Leeds United (NA) |
| 14:00 | | Report | Rich 52' |

| 13 January 2013 | Sunderland (NA) | 7–2 | Sheffield (NO) |
| 14:00 | Mead 12', 34', 48'; McDougall 18'; Furness 68'; Williams 77' | Report | Giampalma 16'; Mitchell 89' |

| 13 January 2013 | Barnet (NA) | 2–1 (a.e.t.) | Lewes (S) |
| 14:00 | King 65'; Sowden 96' | Report | Veiga 72' |

| 27 January 2013 | Watford (NA) | 0–1 (a.e.t.) | Charlton Athletic (NA) |
| 14:00 | | Report | Shepherd 119' |

| 27 January 2013 | Cardiff City (NA) | 2–0 | Brighton & Hove Albion (S) |
| 14:00 | Lawrence 28'; Isaac 85' | Report |

| 21 February 2013 | Coventry City (NA) | 0–3 | Aston Villa (NA) |
| 19:45 | | Report | Stringer 14'; Davies 31', 50' |

| 24 February 2013 | Wolverhampton Wanderers (NO) | 0–2 | Blackburn Rovers (N) |
| 14:00 | | Report | Savage 50'; Forster 70' |

| 3 March 2013 | Portsmouth (NA) | 2–1 | Manchester City (NA) |
| 14:00 | Cox 23'; Hillier 36' | Report | Bayley 59' |

Source: FA WPL: Matches

=== Quarter-finals ===
| 10 February 2013 | Sunderland (NA) | 2–0 | Cardiff City (NA) |
| 13:00 | Mead 28'; Williams 80' | Report |

| 10 February 2013 | Leeds United (NA) | 3–2 | Charlton Athletic (NA) |
| 14:00 | Sykes 60'; Huegett 79'; Lipman 84' | Report | Bryan 25', 59' |

| 24 March 2013 | Blackburn Rovers (NO) | 1–1 (a.e.t.) (5–6 p) | Aston Villa (NA) |
| 14:00 | Marsh 75' | Report | Merrick 42' |
| | Penalties |
| | Penalty scored Penalty missed | | Penalty scored |

| 13 January 2013 | Portsmouth (NA) | 2–1 | Barnet (NA) |
| 14:00 | McGee 48'; Wilson 80' | Report | Goal |

Source: FA WPL: Matches

=== Semi-finals ===
| 7 April 2013 | Sunderland (NA) | 1–4 | Leeds United (NA) |
| 14:00 | Atkinson 32' | Report | Rich 20'; Sheen 23'; Lipman 90+2' |

| 14 April 2013 | Aston Villa (NA) | 2–1 | Portsmouth (NA) |
| 14:00 | Richards 41'; Jones 78' | Report | Kempson 75' |

Source: FA WPL: Matches

=== Final ===
5 May 2013
14:00

| Leeds United | 0–0 (a.e.t.) | Aston Villa |
|---|---|---|
| | Report |
Penalties
| Sykes (penalty missed) | 4–5 | (penalty scored) Davies |
