= 1976 Japan rugby union tour of Europe =

Summary
| P | W | D | L |
Total
| 10 | 3 | 0 | 7 |
Test match
| 3 | 0 | 0 | 3 |
Opponent
| P | W | D | L |
Scotland XV
| 1 | 0 | 0 | 1 |
England U-23
| 1 | 0 | 0 | 1 |
Italy
| 1 | 0 | 0 | 1 |

The 1976 Japan rugby union tour of Europe was a series of ten matches played by the Japan national rugby union team in the United Kingdom and Italy in September and October 1976. Japan won three and lost seven of their ten matches. They lost all three of the matches against international representative teams; a Scottish XV, England under-23 and Italy.

== Matches ==
Scores and results list Japan's points tally first.

| Opponent | For | Against | Date | Venue |
|---|---|---|---|---|
| Gloucestershire | 10 | 62 | 22 September | Kingsholm Stadium, Gloucester |
| Scottish XV | 9 | 34 | 25 September | Murrayfield Stadium, Edinburgh |
| English Students XV | 21 | 16 | 29 September | Edge Hall Road, Orrell |
| Combined Services | 21 | 23 | 2 October | Devonport |
| Cambridge University | 38 | 35 | 6 October | Cambridge |
| Combined Welsh Clubs | 9 | 63 | 9 October | St. Helen's, Swansea |
| Oxford University | 37 | 0 | 13 October | Oxford |
| England Under-23 | 15 | 58 | 16 October | Twickenham Stadium London |
| Italy Under-21 | 30 | 31 | 19 October | L'Aquila |
| Italy | 3 | 25 | 21 October | Padua |
