= Kim Turner =

Kim Turner may refer to:

- Kim Turner (hurdler) (born 1961), American athlete
- Kim Turner (footballer) (born 1985), North Irish association footballer
