= Danielle Young =

English footballer

Personal information
- Full name: Danielle Young
- Date of birth: 8 October 1990 (age 36)
- Place of birth: Droylsden, England
- Position: Forward

Team information
- Current team: Fylde
- Number: 7

Senior career*
Years	Team	Apps	(Gls)
2005–2014	Manchester City		
2015	Everton		
2016–2023	Fylde	88	

Managerial career
- 2020-2023: Fylde
- 2023-2025: Curzon Ashton
- 2025–: Wigan Athletic
- * Club domestic league appearances and goals as of 22:01, 27 January 2019 (UTC)

Danielle Young is an English football manager and former player who is currently the manager of Wigan Athletic Women. As a player, she played as a forward for Manchester City, Everton and Fylde.

== Playing career ==
Danielle Young spent much of her career at Manchester City, playing with them from her teenage years until 2014. She was part of City's team in their first year as a professional side in the 2014 season when they joined the FA WSL. Young featured only intermittently and finally parted with the club at the end of the season. She was signed shortly afterwards by WSL 2 side Everton.

Young joined Preston North End Women in late 2015, playing in the FA Women's National League. The club rebranded as AFC Fylde in 2016. Young remained at Fylde until 2023.

== Managerial career ==
In 2020, after Fylde reversed the decision to disband their women's team, Young became co-manager, sharing the role with Kim Turner while continuing to play for the club in the Women's FA Northern Premier Division. Young stepped down from the managerial role in February 2023 but continued to play for Fylde until the end of the 2022-2023 season.

At the beginning of 2024, Young joined fifth-tier side Curzon Ashton Women as head coach, leading the team to victory in the final of the Alliance Design & Print Plate. She left the club in June 2025 to take up a new post as manager of Wigan Athletic.

== Career statistics ==
=== Club ===
As of match played 27 January 2019

Club	Season	League			Cup		League Cup		Continental		Total	
Club	Season	Division	Apps	Goals	Apps	Goals	Apps	Goals	Apps	Goals	Apps	Goals
Manchester City	2007–08	National League North							—			
Manchester City	2008–09	National League North							—			
Manchester City	2009–10	National League North							—			
Manchester City	2010–11	National League North							—			
Manchester City	2011–12	National League North							—			
Manchester City	2012–13	National League North	14	1			3	2	—		17	3
Manchester City	2014	FA WSL	6	0	0	0	3	0	—		9	0
Manchester City	Total								—			
Everton	2015	FA WSL 2							—		3	
Fylde	2016–17	National League North							—			
Fylde	2017–18	National League North							—			
Fylde	2018–19	National League North	10	0	2	1	2	1	—		14	2
Fylde	Total								—			
Career total									—			

== Honours ==
Manchester City

- Women's League Cup: 2014
