= Zoe Tynan =

English footballer

Personal information
- Full name: Zoe Tynan
- Date of birth: 20 May 1998
- Place of birth: Mossley Hill, Liverpool, England
- Date of death: 30 August 2016 (aged 18)
- Place of death: Allerton, Liverpool, England
- Position: Midfielder

Youth career
- 2004–2009: Liverpool Feds
- 2009–2015: Everton
- 2015–2016: Manchester City

Senior career*
Years	Team	Apps	(Gls)
2016	Manchester City	0	(0)
2016	Fylde Ladies	2	(0)

International career
- England U15
- England U17
- England U19
- * Club domestic league appearances and goals

Zoe Tynan (20 May 1998 – 30 August 2016) was an English footballer who played as a midfielder for Manchester City and Fylde Ladies.

== Youth career ==
Tynan started playing with Liverpool Feds at age six, while also competing in swimming, athletics and cross country running competitions, as well as playing netball and rounders. She was a promising track athlete, once ranked third in England in the 1200m, but chose to focus on football, training at Everton's Centre of Excellence for six years before joining Manchester City.

== Club career ==
Having signed for Manchester City's academy in 2015, Tynan was given her first team debut when she played all 90 minutes of a FA Women's Cup quarter-final against Sporting Club Albion on 3 April 2016.

Though she did not play any further matches for Manchester City, her performance drew the attention of FA Women's Premier League side Fylde Ladies for whom she signed in the summer of 2016. Tynan would go on to play twice for Fylde.

== International career ==
From age 12, Tynan was involved in several England coaching camps, receiving a call-up to the U-15 team in 2013 for a match against Scotland held at St George's Park. She also represented her country at U-17 level. Tynan was later called up to the England U-19 squad and took part in a training camp under manager Mo Marley in August 2016.

== Death ==
On 31 August 2016, it was reported that Tynan had died at the age of 18. It was subsequently announced that her death was an act of suicide, caused by a fatal collision with a train at West Allerton railway station. The news was met by an outpouring of tributes from across the women's footballing community in England.

== Legacy ==
In 2017 Tynan's first team, Liverpool Feds, announced the creation of the Zoe Tynan Tournament for under-10 and under-12 7-a-side teams which would be played on 20 May, coinciding with the date of her birth. The competition has become an annual event which raises money for charity.

Tynan's final club, Fylde Ladies, retired the number 19 shirt in her memory. In 2022, the Zoe Tynan award was created, to be given to the player of the match in the WSL academy cup final.

== Career statistics ==
=== Club ===
Appearances and goals by club, season and competition
Club	Season	League			Cup		League Cup		Continental		Total	
Club	Season	Division	Apps	Goals	Apps	Goals	Apps	Goals	Apps	Goals	Apps	Goals
Manchester City	2016	FA WSL	0	0	1	0	0	0	—		1	0
Fylde Ladies	2016–17	FA Women's Premier League	2	0	0	0	0	0	—		2	0
Career total			2	0	1	0	0	0	0	0	3	0
