= Wigan Athletic F.C. Women =

Professional football club

Wigan Athletic Women
- Full name: Wigan Athletic Football Club Women
- Nickname: Latics
- Founded: 2024; 2 years ago
- Ground: Edge Hall Road
- Capacity: 3,000
- Owner: Mike Danson
- Chairman: Ben Goodburn
- Manager: Danielle Young
- League: North West Women's Regional Football League Division One North
- 2025–26: Lancashire Women's County League Premier Division, 1st (promoted)
- Website: wiganathletic.com

Wigan Athletic Football Club Women (/ˈwɪɡən/) is a women's football club based in Wigan, Greater Manchester, England. The club plays in the North West Women's Regional Football League.

== History ==
Since 1999, Wigan Athletic F.C. had been unofficially affiliated to an independent women's team called Wigan Athletic Ladies. In March 2024, the club launched its own official women's football team, and were accepted into the Lancashire Women's County League for the 2024–25 season.

In May 2024, the club hosted trials for new players and announced that home games would be played at Edge Hall Road, with the facility also being redeveloped alongside Wigan Warriors Women rugby league club as an 'elite training centre'. In June 2024, the club announced a further trial (invite-only) exclusively to players who had played within the professional women's football pyramid during the 2023/24 season.

On 22 May 2024, the club officially announced Hayley Sherratt as the Head of Women's Operations. On 12 July 2024, former Wigan Athletic men's team captain Emmerson Boyce was announced as the club’s first manager.

The club played its inaugural season in the Championship division of the Lancashire Women's County League, and finished as champions after going undefeated in the league. They won their second successive title in the following season, winning all 18 of their Premier Division games, and were promoted to the North West Women's Regional Football League.
