= Sarah Gibbs =

New Zealand footballer

Personal information
- Full name: Sarah Gibbs
- Date of birth: 5 December 1982 (age 43)
- Place of birth: New Zealand

International career
| Years | Team | Apps | (Gls) |
| 2004–2005 | New Zealand | 4 | (0) |

Sarah Gibbs (born 5 December 1982) is an association football player who represented New Zealand at international level.

Gibbs made her Football Ferns debut in a 0–2 loss to Australia on 18 February 2004, and finished her international career with four caps to her credit.
