= Andrea Worrall =

English-born Welsh footballer (born 1977)

Personal information
- Full name: Andrea Sarah Worrall
- Date of birth: 1 April 1977 (age 49)
- Place of birth: Ashton-under-Lyne, England
- Position: Goalkeeper

Youth career
- Tameside MBC

Senior career*
Years	Team	Apps	(Gls)
–1998	Stockport Ladies		
1998–2001	Everton Ladies		
2001	Liverpool Ladies		
2001–2003	Manchester City Ladies		
2003–2005	Leeds United Ladies		
2005–2008	Stockport County Ladies		
2008–2011	Manchester City Ladies		
2011	Liverpool Ladies	6	(0)
2013–2014	Manchester City Ladies	2	(0)

International career
	Wales	6	(0)
- * Club domestic league appearances and goals as of 17:40, 10 December 2007 (UTC)

Andrea Sarah "Andie" Worrall (born 1 April 1977) is an English-born Welsh international footballer, who played as a goalkeeper.

== Club career ==
=== Early career ===
Worrall began playing for Tameside MBC after watching her father play football for a pub team throughout her childhood. She had been prevented from playing organised football at school because she was female.

=== Senior career ===
Her senior career has taken in Stockport Girls/Ladies, Everton Ladies, Liverpool Ladies, Manchester City Ladies, Leeds United Ladies and Stockport County Ladies.

Worrall played at Wembley with Everton in August 1998. The Blues lost the inaugural AXA Challenge Trophy to Arsenal on penalties, despite Worrall saving from Faye White. She also featured in the 1998–99 FA Women's Premier League Cup final, a 3–1 defeat to Arsenal at Prenton Park in March 1999.

In 2008 Worrall returned to Manchester City Ladies. In March 2011 she made the difficult decision to leave Manchester City for Liverpool Ladies, in order to play in the new FA WSL. Worrall left Liverpool after the 2011 FA WSL season. She rejoined City in February 2013 when fellow goalkeeper Danielle Brown suffered a knee injury.

== International career ==
Worrall was called into the England squad for a friendly against Italy in April 1998.

She later played for Wales, producing "heroics" in a 2–0 European Championship qualifying defeat to Belgium in December 1999. During qualifying for the 2003 FIFA Women's World Cup, Worrall played in a 5–1 defeat to Scotland at Almondvale Stadium in October 2001. She won a total of six caps for Wales.

== Personal life ==
Worrall is an avid supporter of Manchester City.

In October 2013 The Lesbian & Gay Foundation named Worrall 'Homo Heroes Role Model of the Year' for her work in championing LGBT causes. At the time, she was working as a manager for a housing association in deprived inner city areas of Manchester.
