= Edge Hall Road =

Sports venue in Orrell, England

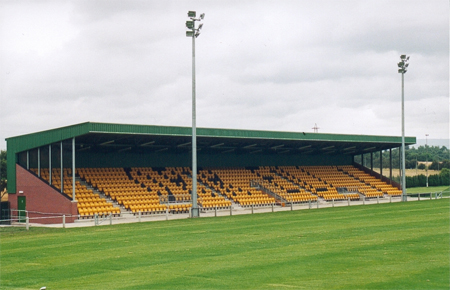
- The north stand pictured in 1997
- Interactive map of Edge Hall Road
- Full name: Edge Hall Road Community Stadium
- Location: Orrell, Greater Manchester, WN5 8TG
- Coordinates: 53°31′53″N 2°42′23″W
- Capacity: 3,000 (300 seats) (Note: Edge Halls capacity was around 5,300 (300 seats) when Orrell R.U.F.C. were playing top flight rugby union in the 1990s. Modern capacity reduced due to damaged terracing.)

Construction
- Built: 1950
- Opened: 1950

Tenants
- Orrell (1950–2007); Wigan Warriors (training base; 2007–19); Wigan Athletic Women (2024–); Wigan Warriors Women (2026–)

The Edge Hall Road Community Stadium is a multi-sport stadium, located in Orrell, Greater Manchester. It is currently the home of football club, Wigan Athletic Women and rugby league side, Wigan Warriors Women. Originally built as the permanent ground of the local Orrell rugby union team in 1950, the club departed the stadium in 2007, with the development team of Wigan Warriors beginning to use the ground that same year.

== History ==
=== 1950–2007: Orrell senior team ===
Edge Hall Road became the permanent residence of Orrell R.U.F.C. in 1950, replacing several locations previously used by the club, including Kitt Green and Abbey Lakes, both areas within Orrell.

Orrell RUFC were once a successful rugby union team, but the advent of professionalism saw them struggle to return to the Guinness Premiership following their relegation in 1997.

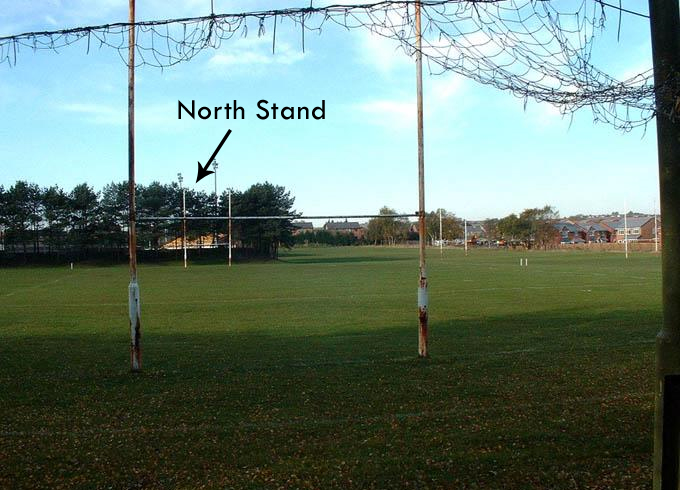
The training pitches that the club formerly used outside of the stadium

With mounting debt, the club was sold to Dave Whelan, then owner of Wigan Warriors and current Wigan Athletic chairman. Following his takeover of the club, and the death of the landlord, the ground and its surrounding land was sold to Mr. Whelan's company, Whelco Holdings. After several successful seasons, Whelan withdrew his financial backing and the club again began to struggle, Whelan charging £1,000 per match to use the stadium. This excessive rent, coupled with Whelan's decision to ban the club from accessing the clubhouse, forced the club to relocate to playing fields at St John Rigby college for the 2007–08 season.

=== 2007–2019: Wigan Warriors Training Complex and Development Squad ===
In January 2007, the clubhouse was converted into a state of the art training facility for the Wigan Warriors Rugby League Club.

The pitch is currently used for training and Wigan Academy games. Wigan chairman Ian Lenagan has recently suggested that he will be investing in ground improvements to enable the Warriors to play lower-key games in the near future. While the ground has a technical capacity of 5,300, the safety certificate only allows 3,000 at present, due partly to damaged terracing. Expected improvements would be replacement of this terracing and a permanent food and drink outlet. As of the 2008 season, fans have been banned from parking inside the ground and have faced increased admission prices.

On 7 July 2008 Wigan Warriors announced a new three year sponsorship deal with the Co-operative and as part of the deal changed Edge Hall Road to The Co-operative Community Stadium. In April 2013 the ground was renamed The Wigan Laundry Company Community Stadium after a draw. Twelve months later, the naming rights went to Solid Strip.

=== 2024–present: Wigan Athletic Women and Wigan Warriors Women ===
In May 2024, a joint statement by Wigan Athletic and Wigan Warriors announced that Edge Hall Road would be redeveloped as an elite training centre for women's football and rugby league, with the facility to be immediately used as the home ground for the football club with their inaugural season being 2024/25. Wigan Warriors made the venue their home ground ahead of the 2026 season, moving from the Robin Park Arena.
