= Abbie McManus =

English football player

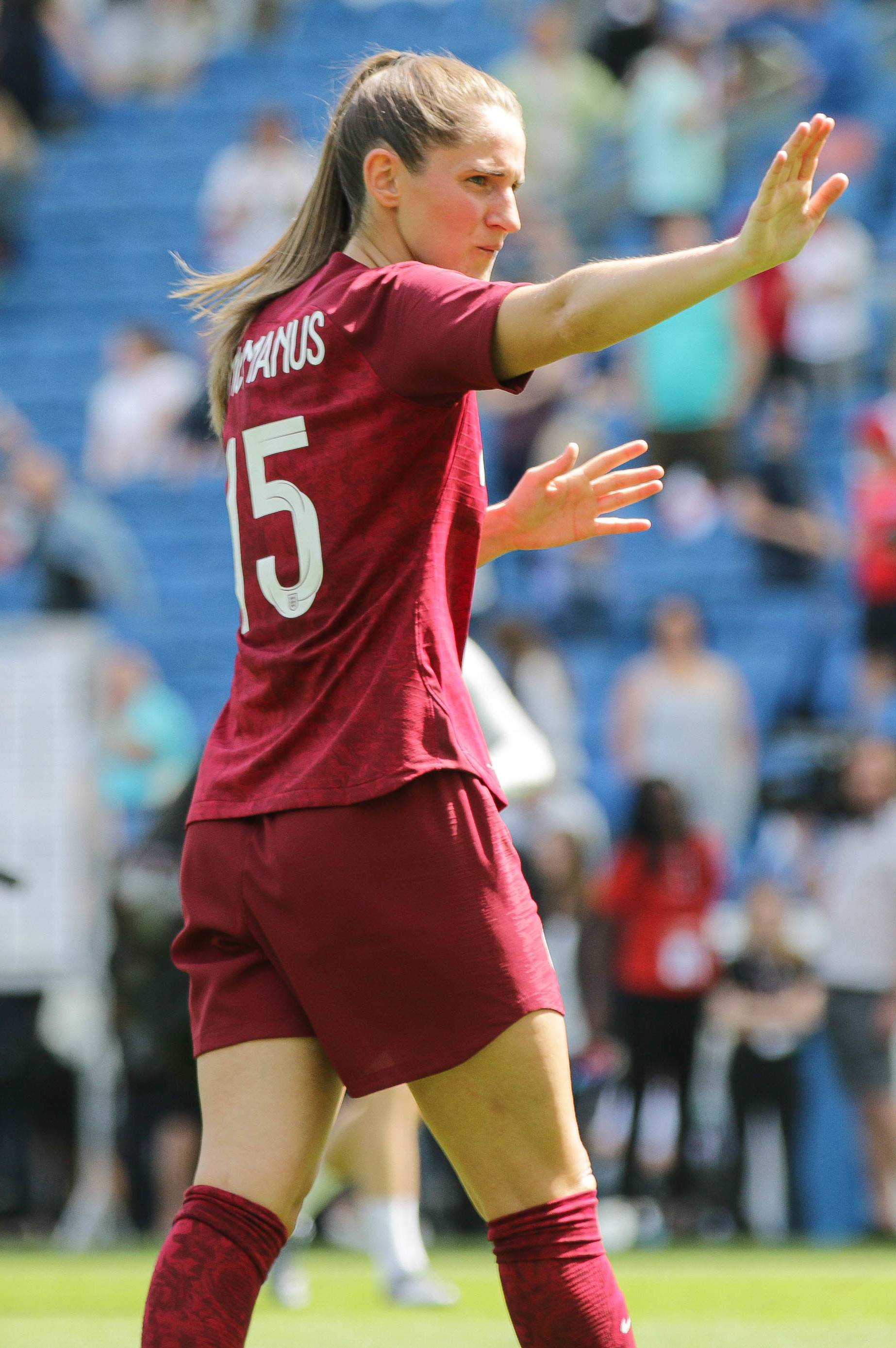
- McManus at the 2019 FIFA Women's World Cup in France

Personal information
- Full name: Abbie Mary McManus
- Date of birth: 14 January 1993 (age 33)
- Place of birth: Prestwich, England
- Height: 5 ft 8 in (1.72 m)
- Position: Defender

Youth career
- Bury Girls
- Manchester City

Senior career*
Years	Team	Apps	(Gls)
2009–2013	Manchester City	67	(6)
2013–2014	Sheffield FC	13	(1)
2014–2019	Manchester City	60	(2)
2019–2021	Manchester United	16	(0)
2021	→ Tottenham Hotspur (loan)	10	(0)
2021–2023	Leicester City	19	(1)

International career^{‡}
2016	England U23	6	(0)
2018–2023	England	18	(0)
- * Club domestic league appearances and goals as of 18:37, 24 May 2022 (UTC) ‡ National team caps and goals as of 11 March 2020

Abbie Mary McManus (born 14 January 1993) is an English former professional footballer who has previously played as a defender for Leicester City in the FA Women's Super League and the England national team. She has also represented England on the under-23 national team.

== Club career ==
=== Early career and Manchester City ===
Prestwich-born McManus began playing football with her brother Scott. She joined a boys' team, then Bury Girls, where she was named Under-16s Most Improved Player in 2008. She signed for FA Women's Premier League Northern Division club Manchester City and established herself in the team which won the League and promotion to the National Division in 2011–12.

=== Sheffield FC ===
In August 2013, McManus transferred to Sheffield FC, making 13 league appearances during her single season at the club as Sheffield won the FA Women's Premier League Northern Division title.

=== Return to Manchester City ===
When Sheikh Mansour-backed Manchester City successfully bid for an FA WSL franchise in 2014, McManus returned to the club. She made her top division debut for Manchester City in May 2014 against Everton at the Etihad Stadium. She scored her first goal for the club against Liverpool during the 2014 WSL Cup. The team went on to win the WSL Cup after defeating Arsenal 1–0 in the final.

In April 2015, she competed in the 2015–16 FA Women's Cup. Manchester City were eliminated by Chelsea in the semi-finals.

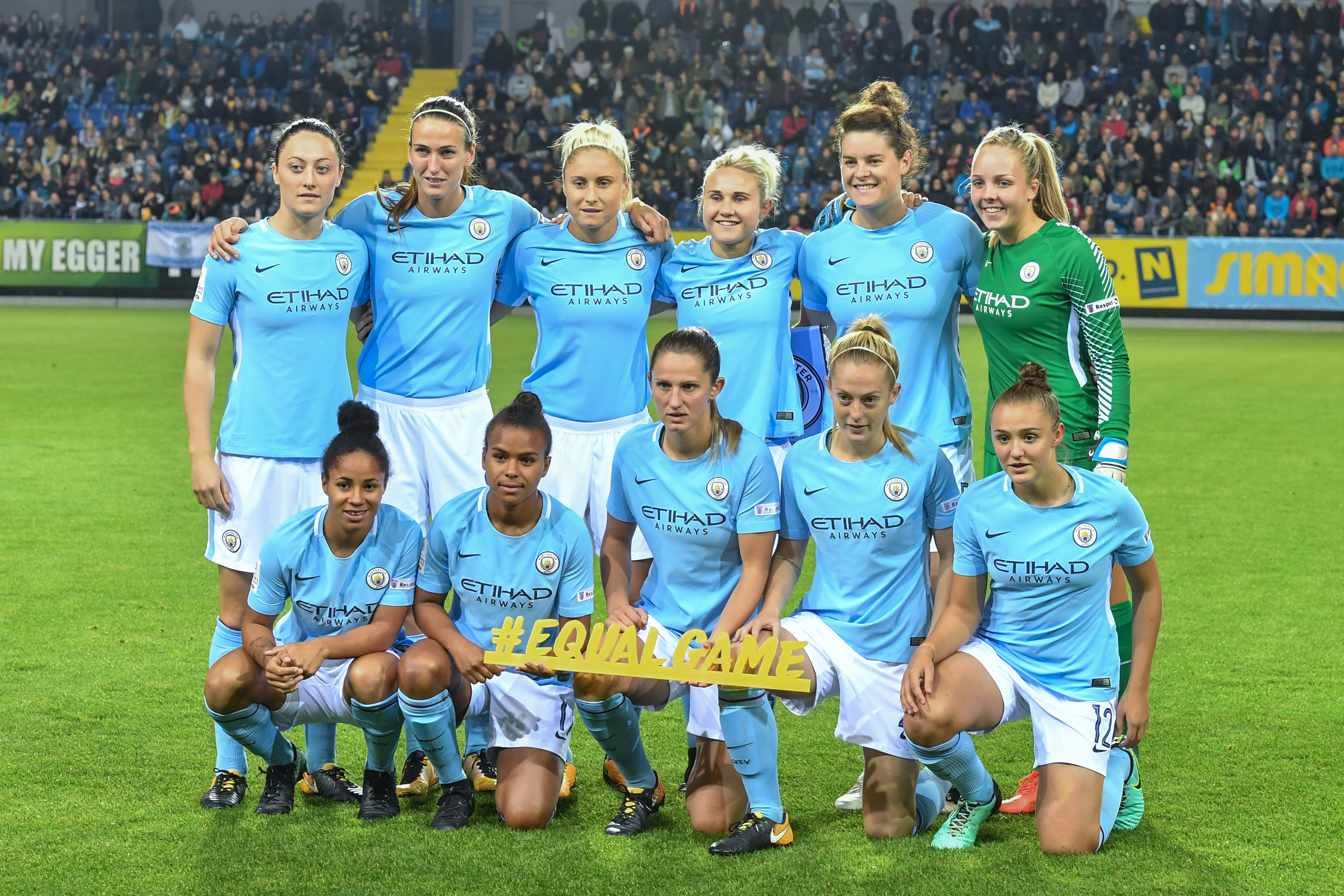
McManus (bottom row, centre) before a UEFA Women's Champions League match between Manchester City and SKN St. Poelten, October 2017

In August 2016, she suffered an ankle injury that prevented her from playing in the remaining part of the 2016 FA WSL season. In December 2016, she re-signed with Manchester City. In 2017, she made her UEFA Women's Champions League debut in Manchester City's 1–0 win over Fortuna Hjørring. She agreed to extend her Manchester City contract in June 2018.

=== Manchester United ===
On 17 May 2019, McManus announced she was leaving Manchester City, having spent a total of 12 years at the club. A week later, it was announced she was to join Manchester United, the club she grew up supporting, ahead of the 2019–20 season. McManus made her debut for Manchester United against Manchester City in the FA WSL on 7 September 2019, a 1–0 loss in the inaugural Manchester derby. She scored her first goal for the club on 15 January 2020 in a 2–1 win over Brighton & Hove Albion in a League Cup quarter-final. She left United at the end of the 2020–21 season following the expiry of her contract.

==== Loan to Tottenham Hotspur ====
On 21 January 2021, McManus joined Tottenham Hotspur on loan for the rest of the season.

=== Leicester City ===
On 27 July 2021, McManus signed with newly-promoted Leicester City ahead of their first season in the FA WSL.

== International career ==
In February 2018, McManus was in an Asda supermarket buying some eggs when she received a telephone call informing her of her first call-up to the senior England team. She was a late replacement for Steph Houghton, who withdrew from the squad for the 2018 SheBelieves Cup with an injured ankle. At the opening match of the tournament, a 4–1 win over France, McManus won her first cap as a 14th-minute substitute for Anita Asante.

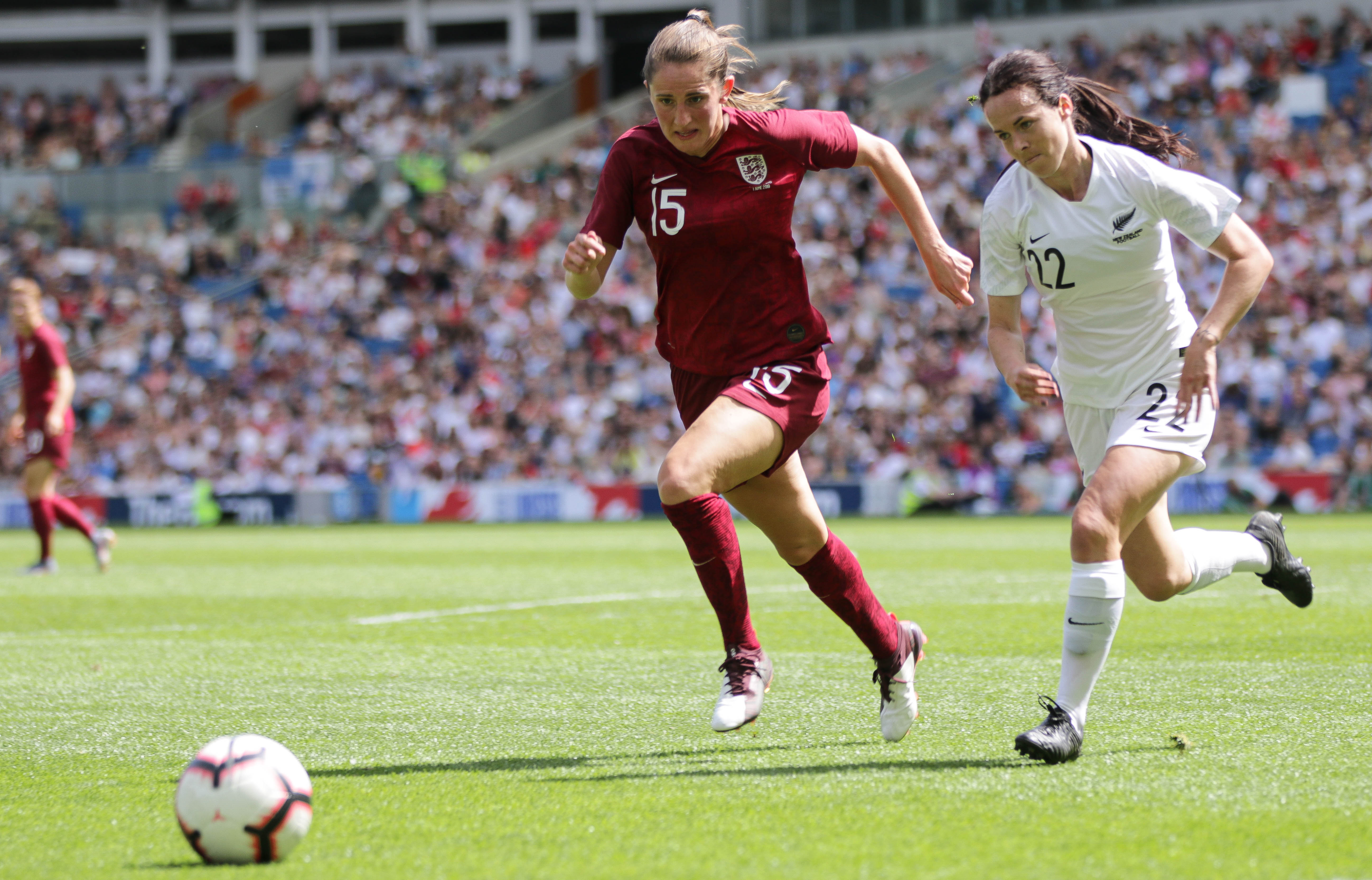
McManus (left) playing for England in June 2019

She retained her place in the squad for England's successful 2019 FIFA Women's World Cup qualification campaign and hailed the influence of new national team coach Phil Neville: "I didn't seem to be ticking the boxes when Mark Sampson and Mo Marley were in charge but that seems to have changed since Phil has been involved. I'm really enjoying things under Phil because he's very tactical and that's what we like at City, too. I'm delighted to be picked for the seniors and I hope I can continue to be picked. I want to improve under Phil and learn from him."

In February 2019, McManus was called up for her second consecutive SheBelieves Cup, making two appearances as England won the tournament for the first time.

In June 2019, McManus was selected in England's 23-player squad for the 2019 FIFA Women's World Cup in France. She made three appearances including two starts as England reached the semi-finals.

McManus was allotted 202 when the Football Association announced their legacy numbers scheme to honour the 50th anniversary of England’s inaugural international.

In 2023, McManus announced that she was retiring.

== Post playering career ==
McManus was medically retired from professional football. Following her retirement, she began training and work as a firefighter with the Greater Manchester Fire and Rescue Service.

== Personal life ==
McManus' brother Scott is also a footballer; he last played for non-league side Coalville Town.

McManus was in a relationship with GB national handball player and former London 2012 Olympian Holly Lam-Moores.

In 2026, she appeared on the television dating show First Dates, during which she said she now worked as a firefighter.

== Career statistics ==
=== Club ===
As of 18:37, 24 May 2022 (UTC).

Appearances and goals by club, season and competition
Club	Season	League			FA Cup (Note: Includes the Women's FA Cup)		League Cup (Note: Includes the WPL Cup and WSL Cup/Women's League Cup)		Europe (Note: Includes the UEFA Women's Champions League)		Total	
Club	Season	Division	Apps	Goals	Apps	Goals	Apps	Goals	Apps	Goals	Apps	Goals
Manchester City	2009–10	WPL Northern	12	0	0	0	1	0	—		13	0
Manchester City	2010–11	WPL Northern	20	2	0	0	0	0	—		20	2
Manchester City	2011–12	WPL Northern	18	2	0	0	1	0	—		19	2
Manchester City	2012–13	WPL National	17	2	0	0	3	0	—		20	2
Manchester City	Total		67	6	0	0	5	0	—		72	6
Sheffield FC	2013–14	WPL Northern	13	1	0	0	3	0	—		16	1
Manchester City	2014	WSL 1	12	0	0	0	6	1	—		18	1
Manchester City	2015	WSL 1	7	0	0	0	5	0	—		12	0
Manchester City	2016	WSL 1	9	0	3	0	0	0	0	0	12	0
Manchester City	2017	WSL 1	3	0	0	0	—		4	0	7	0
Manchester City	2017–18	WSL 1	16	2	1	0	7	0	8	0	32	2
Manchester City	2018–19	WSL	13	0	1	0	5	0	2	0	21	0
Manchester City	Total		60	2	5	0	23	1	14	0	102	3
Manchester United	2019–20	WSL	11	0	1	0	6	1	—		18	1
Manchester United	2020–21	WSL	5	0	0	0	2	1	—		7	1
Manchester United	Total		16	0	1	0	8	2	0	0	25	2
Tottenham Hotspur	2020–21	WSL	10	0	2	0	0	0	—		12	0
Leicester City	2021–22	WSL	19	1	2	0	3	0	—		24	1
Career total			185	10	10	0	42	3	14	0	251	13

== Honours ==
=== Club ===
Manchester City

- FA Women's Premier League Northern Division: 2011–12
- FA WSL: 2016
- FA Women's Cup: 2016–17, 2018–19
- FA WSL Cup: 2014, 2016, 2018–19

Sheffield

- FA Women's Premier League Northern Division: 2013–14

=== International ===
England

- SheBelieves Cup: 2019
