= Hannah Forster =

English footballer

Personal information
- Date of birth: 22 February 1991 (age 35)
- Place of birth: Wigan, England
- Position: Midfielder

Team information
- Current team: Fylde
- Number: 4

Senior career*
Years	Team	Apps	(Gls)
2006–2015	Blackburn Rovers	18	(0)
2016–	Fylde	97	(10)
- * Club domestic league appearances and goals as of 15:47, 28 October 2009 (UTC)

Hannah Forster (born 22 February 1991) is an English female football midfielder. She currently plays for Fylde Ladies F.C. She was born in Wigan.

== Club career ==
Forster joined Blackburn's centre of excellence in the 2006 close season, after a successful trial, and was a regular on the bench the following season for the first team in the FA Women's Premier League. In February 2007 Forster came on a substitute for Rovers in the final of the Lancashire Cup, scoring one of six goals as Rovers retained the trophy. In November 2007, Forster scored three times as Rovers beat Preston Ladies 18–0 in the Second Round of the Lancashire Cup. She scored again as Rovers beat Brazil Ladies 17–0 in the following round.

In June 2009 she was awarded the Reserve Manager's Player of the Year trophy.

== International career ==
At the age of 11 years, and at the time a ball girl for Wigan Athletic, Forster played in the United Kingdom team the Fox Kids Cup in Barcelona.

== Statistics ==
Club	Season	League		WFA Cup		Premier League Cup		County Cup		Other		Total	
Club	Season	Apps	Goals	Apps	Goals	Apps	Goals	Apps	Goals	Apps	Goals	Apps	Goals
Blackburn Rovers Ladies	2006–07	12	0	2	0	0	0	3	1	0	0	17	1
Blackburn Rovers Ladies	2007–08	1	0	1	0	1	0	2	4	0	0	5	4
Blackburn Rovers Ladies	2008–09	4	0	0	0	0	0	0	0	0	0	4	0
Blackburn Rovers Ladies	2009–10	0	0	0	0	0	0	1	0	0	0	1	0
Career total		17	0	3	0	1	0	6	5	0	0	27	5
