= Saffron Jordan =

English association football player

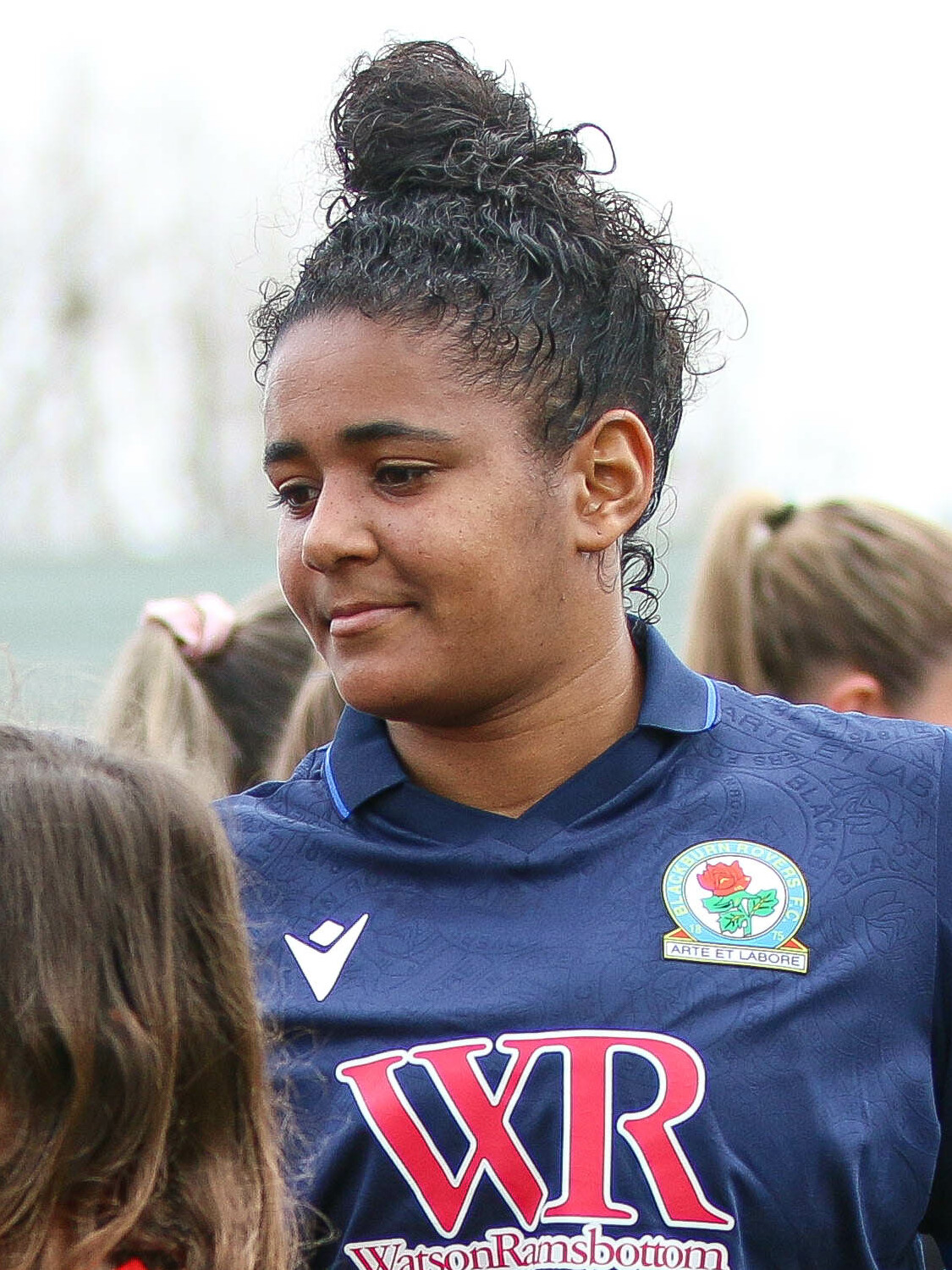
- Jordan in 2023

Personal information
- Date of birth: 27 November 1993 (age 32)
- Place of birth: Manchester, England
- Position: Forward

Team information
- Current team: Darwen FC Ladies

Youth career
- Manchester United

College career
| Years | Team | Apps | (Gls) |
| 2013–2014 | Saint Leo University | 33 | (7) |

Senior career*
| Years | Team | Apps | (Gls) |
- Manchester City
| 2014–2023 | Blackburn Rovers | 251 | (123) |
| 2023-2024 | Stoke City | | |
| 2024- | Darwen FC Ladies | | |
- * Club domestic league appearances and goals

Saffron Jordan (born 27 November 1993) is an English professional footballer who plays as a forward.

== Early life ==
Jordan was born in Salford, Manchester and attended Salford City Academy. She represented Manchester United at youth level before moving to Florida to study for three years at Saint Leo University, where she continued to play football. During her freshman year, she quickly became known for her goalscoring talent and was named in the NSCAA All-Region Team.

== Club career ==
Jordan signed for Blackburn Rovers in 2014. In July 2020 and June 2021 she signed contract extensions.

In the 2018-19 season, Jordan scored 47 goals in 36 appearances, playing a key role in Rovers' winning a quadruple and earning promotion to the second division Championship for the first time.

Jordan was the Blackburn Rovers captain until September 2022 when she stood down. She was replaced by a "leadership group" of three players. Natasha Fenton, Jade Richards and Helen Seed were elected by players and staff to lead the team for the 2022–2023 season.

In the 2023-2024 season Jordan played for Stoke City. She joined Darwen FC Ladies in summer 2024.

== Personal life ==
Jordan has a dual career, having worked for the NHS at since 2016. Throughout the COVID-19 pandemic, Saffron Jordan worked as a member of an auditing team in the critical care unit at Royal Salford Hospital, while also continuing to play football.

== Awards ==
Jordan was selected in the Her Football Hub team of the month for October 2021. In the same month, she was also nominated for FA Women's Championship Player of the Month.
