= Kelly McDougall =

English footballer

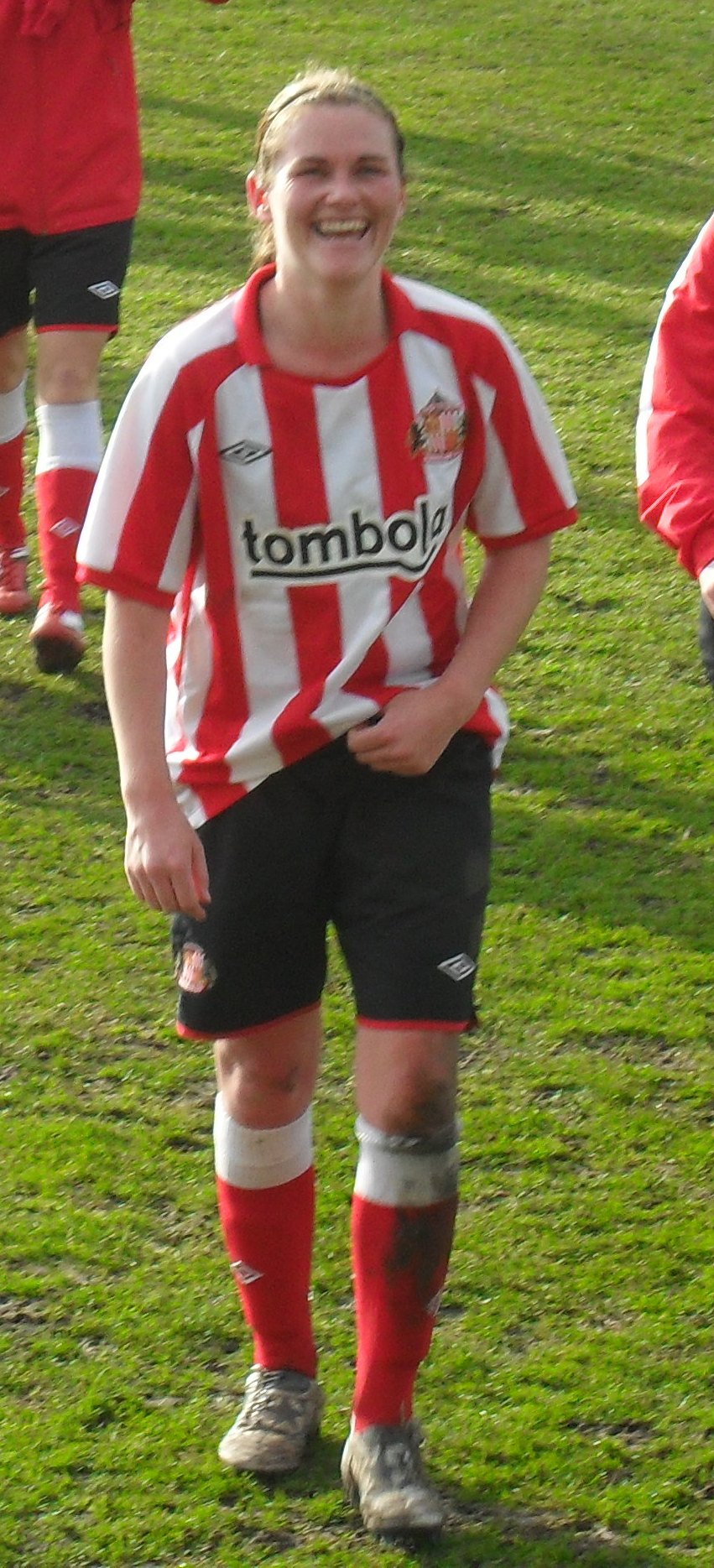

Personal information
- Full name: Kelly Marie McDougall
- Date of birth: 22 January 1984 (age 42)
- Place of birth: Whiston, England
- Position: Midfielder

Youth career
- Rainhill United
- Knowsley
- 1996–1998: Everton

Senior career*
Years	Team	Apps	(Gls)
1998–2008	Everton		
2008–2016	Sunderland		

International career^{‡}
2003–2004	England	9	(0)
- * Club domestic league appearances and goals ‡ National team caps and goals as of 09:50, 28 May 2010 (UTC)

Kelly Marie McDougall (born 22 January 1984) is an English former international footballer. She played in midfield for Everton Ladies and Sunderland Women.

== Club career ==
McDougall joined Everton aged 12, and also played youth football for Knowsley and Rainhill United. She continued to play for Everton while attending the National Player Development Centre at Loughborough University and was an unused substitute when the club won the 2008 FA Women's Premier League Cup.

That August McDougall left Everton after 10 years in the team to sign for Sunderland Women in the FA Women's Premier League Northern Division. In her first season at her new club McDougall helped them to promotion and the FA Women's Cup final. Her stoppage-time goal was not enough to win the cup, as Arsenal won 2–1 at Pride Park. In November 2009 McDougall scored the winner as Sunderland beat Arsenal 2–1, only The Gunners' second league defeat in six years.

== International career ==
McDougall scored on her England U16 debut, against Scotland in Dublin. She also played at U18 level then became a regular at U19 level, featuring in the 2002 FIFA U-19 Women's World Championship.

McDougall made her debut for the senior England team in a 1–0 friendly defeat in Italy on 25 February 2003.

McDougall works for Bothal Primary School in Ashington and teaches P.E (info from Bothal student).

She was given number 147 when the FA announced their legacy numbers scheme to honour the 50th anniversary of England’s inaugural international.
