= Kim Turner (footballer) =

Northern Irish footballer

Personal information
- Full name: Kimberley Turner
- Date of birth: 1 February 1985 (age 41)
- Place of birth: Belfast, Northern Ireland
- Height: 5 ft 4 in (1.63 m)
- Position: Midfielder

Team information
- Current team: Glentoran (Head of Women and Girls)

Youth career
- 2000–2003: Belfast United

College career
Years	Team	Apps	(Gls)
2003–2007	Southern Miss Lady Eagles		

Senior career*
Years	Team	Apps	(Gls)
2007	Claremont Stars	3	(0)
2009	Grindavík	6	(1)
2009–2010	Manchester City	7	(1)
2010–2013	Blackburn Rovers Ladies	35	(2)
2013–2014	Manchester City	6	(0)
2014–2015	Sheffield	5	(0)
2015–2019	Fylde	40	(3)

International career^{‡}
	Northern Ireland	46	(4)

Managerial career
- 2020–2022: Fylde (joint with Danielle Young)
- 2022–: Glentoran
- * Club domestic league appearances and goals as of 12:01, 14 December 2022 (UTC) ‡ National team caps and goals as of 12:01, 14 December 2022 (UTC)

Kimberley Turner (born 1 February 1985) is a Northern Irish former footballer, who is currently The Girls' Academy Director and Women's First Team Coach at Glentoran FC. Turner played for Manchester City and Northern Ireland as a midfielder.

== Club career ==
=== Early career ===
Turner represented Orangefield High School and Belfast United LFC. She toured America in 1999 as part of a cross-community project called Belfast Together.

=== Senior career ===
Turner was awarded with a Football Scholarship and played in the NCAA C-USA for the Southern Miss Golden Eagles for four seasons while attending the University of Southern Mississippi. In the summer of 2006 Turner (aged 21) made her first appearance in the WPSL signing for Ajax America Women. She then signed for new WPSL club Claremont Stars for their 2007 season, but made only three appearances due to a knee injury.

By 2009, Turner was playing in Iceland with Grindavík.

At the end of the Icelandic season, Turner moved to England to join Manchester City Ladies, before moving on to compete in the Women's Premier League for Blackburn Rovers Ladies in 2010. In 2013, she left Blackburn to rejoin former club Manchester City and make the club's history as the first professional Man City team to compete in the WSL.

== International career ==
Turner is a full Northern Ireland international. She also played for the Northern Ireland underage teams.

== Coaching career ==
In May 2020 Turner was appointed joint manager of Fylde, alongside Danielle Young. She left the position in July 2022. Shortly afterwards she returned to Belfast for an "absolute dream job" as Head of Girls and Women's Academy with Glentoran.

In Turner's first season with Glentoran the team successfully retained the County Antrim Cup and the Women's Irish Cup.

In June 2023 Turner became the Head Coach of Glentoran Women successfully leading them to a league and cup double and qualifying for the Women's Champions League in her first season

Alongside her Head Coach role at Glentoran Women, Turner is also the Assistant Coach for the Northern Ireland WU19 squad

2023 - NIFL League Champions, Irish Cup Winners

2024 - Co.Antrim Cup Winner

2025 - NIFL League Champions

2026 - Irish Cup Winners
