= Shelly-Ann Cox =

Barbadian scientist and civil servant

- Cox in 2025

Chief Fisheries Officer of Barbados
- In office 3 January 2023 – 13 June 2026

Personal details
- Born: 04 September 1987
- Died: 13 June 2026 (aged 38)
- Education: University of the West Indies

Shelly-Ann Latoya Cox (1988 – 13 June 2026) was a Barbadian scientist and civil servant who served as Chief Fisheries Officer of Barbados from 2023 until her death. During her tenure she oversaw the industry recovery following Hurricane Beryl.

== Career ==
Dr. Cox worked as an ocean professional and specialist in fisheries management. Cox was the founder and CEO of Blue Shell Productions, an organisation involved in ocean development. She worked at the Centre for Resource Management and Environmental Studies (CERMES) of the University of the West Indies at Cave Hill. She was considered a significant member of the fisheries community.

In January 2023, Cox became Chief Fisheries Officer. The role involves advising the Ministry of Environment and the Green and Blue Economy. The role of the officer is to support the fisheries community. She was the youngest person to have held the role. She was also the second woman in the Caribbean to hold an equivalent title. In the role she was tasked with modernising the fishing industry of Barbados. One ambitious target of hers was for Barbados to achieve zero fish waste by 2028. Cox aimed to increase the sector from 0.07% of GDP to 5% within a decade. This required the high tech transformation of the sector using new technology.

Cox announced plans to encourage more young people into the fisheries industry. She was involved in the development of fisheries policy and promoting sustainable aquatic food systems. Cox promoted legislation including the Fish Management Bill and the Seafood Bill in order to grow the blue economy. This involved issues such as digitization and the energy transition. She was noted for the recovery of the fishing industry following Hurricane Beryl. The storm involved damage to property including boats and a fall in fish prices. The recovery involved working with the United Nations Development Programme and the Government of Japan to launch the Barbados Coastal Fisheries Resilience Project. A role of Dockmaster was created for the Fisheries Division of the ministry.

== Personal life ==
Cox had a doctorate in natural resource management from the University of the West Indies. Cox was the mother of one son.

== Death ==
On 13 June 2026, Cox collapsed and was taken to hospital where she later died. She was 38. She had been presenting an award at an event at Weston Fish Market at the time. Tributes were made including from Prime Minister of Barbados Mia Mottley and Deputy Prime Minister Santia Bradshaw. In the industry the Barbados National Union of Fisherfolk Organisations (BARNUFO) and the Central Fish Processors Association (CFPA) also paid tribute. A memorial procession was held at sea. Her funeral was held on 13 July 2026 at the Wildey Gymnasium. The Prime Minister spoke, saying "her life was short but her contribution was not small, it was great".
