= AFC Fylde Women =

English women's football club

Coordinates: 53.758156°N 2.901770°W

- Full name: AFC Fylde Women
- Nickname: "The Coasters"
- Founded: 1971 (as Duke of York)
- Ground: Kellamergh Park, Warton
- Manager: Danny Murphy
- League: FA Women's National League Division One North
- 2024–25: FA Women's National League Division One North, 12th of 12
- Website: https://www.afcfyldewomen.co.uk/
Home colours	Away colours

AFC Fylde Women is an English women's football club affiliated with AFC Fylde and currently playing in the FA Women's National League Division One North.

== History ==
The club was formed under the name Duke of York in 1971, as founder members of the North West Women's League. They were renamed Preston Rangers W.F.C. in 1977 and reached the semi-finals of the FA Women's Cup in 1982–83 and 1989–90.

In 1997, they became Preston North End W.F.C. and finished 1997–98 as champions, winning promotion to the Northern Combination Women's Football League. In 1999, the club was officially affiliated with Preston North End F.C. The club won the Northern Combination Women's Football League in 2005–06 and were promoted into the FA Women's Premier League Northern Division for the first time. In June 2011, Luke Swindlehurst was appointed first team manager, following his previous role as assistant manager in the 2010–11 season.

The club was rebranded Fylde Ladies F.C. in May 2016 after switching its affiliation from Preston North End to AFC Fylde. The name was changed to AFC Fylde Women from the start of the 2019–20 season.

On 28 April 2020, because of the Covid-19 pandemic, the team was disbanded due to growing uncertainties within women's football, and the financial implications of the pandemic. One month later, on 26 May 2020, AFC Fylde reversed its decision, thus saving the club.

== Grounds ==
The team played in Preston when the club was affiliated with Preston North End. In 2016, they moved to Kellamergh Park in the village of Warton, Borough of Fylde. In August 2018, they briefly moved in with their male counterpart team at Mill Farm, training at The Fylde Sports and Education Centre. The club returned to Kellamergh Park a few weeks later.

== Players ==
As of 22 August 2021

Note: Flags indicate national team as defined under FIFA eligibility rules; some limited exceptions apply. Players may hold more than one non-FIFA nationality.

No.	Pos.	Nation	Player
1	GK	ENG	Holly Thomas
2	DF	ENG	Beth Mason
3	DF	ENG	Millie Tindall
4	DF	ENG	Nicola James
5	DF	ENG	Teal Dunion
6	MF	IRL	Orlaith O'Mahony
7	FW	ENG	Ellie Adams
8	MF	ENG	Imogen Borrowdale
9	FW	ENG	Lois Moore
10	MF	ENG	Hollie Kelsh-Ridge
12	MF	ENG	Molly Kelly

=== Retired numbers ===
19 (England) Zoe Tynan, Midfielder (2016)

=== Coaching staff ===
Name	Role
(Republic of Ireland) Danny Murphy	First Team Manager
(Scotland) Justin Mcleod	Goalkeeper coach / assistant manager
(England) James Kelsh-Ridge	First team coach
(England) Esmé Critchley	First team coach
(England) Kallan Green	First team coach
(England) Lewis McPartlan	Strength & Conditioning Coach
(England) Alizeé Liptrot	Physiotherapist
