= 2013 FA Cup =

2013 FA Cup may refer to:

- 2012–13 FA Cup
  - 2013 FA Cup final
- 2012–13 FA Women's Cup
  - 2013 FA Women's Cup final
- 2013–14 FA Cup
- 2013–14 FA Women's Cup
