= Victoria Park (Hartlepool) =

Football stadium in Hartlepool, Durham, England

Coordinates: 54°41′21″N 1°12′46″W

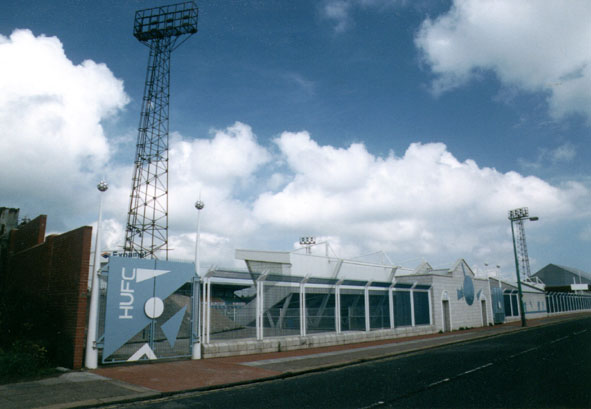
- Outside Victoria Park in April 2003
- Interactive map of Victoria Park
- Location: Clarence Road, Hartlepool, TS24 8BZ
- Owner: Hartlepool Borough Council
- Capacity: 7,858
- Surface: Grass

Construction
- Opened: 1886

Tenants
- Hartlepool United F.C. (1908–present); West Hartlepool R.F.C. (1886–1908, 1998–1999)

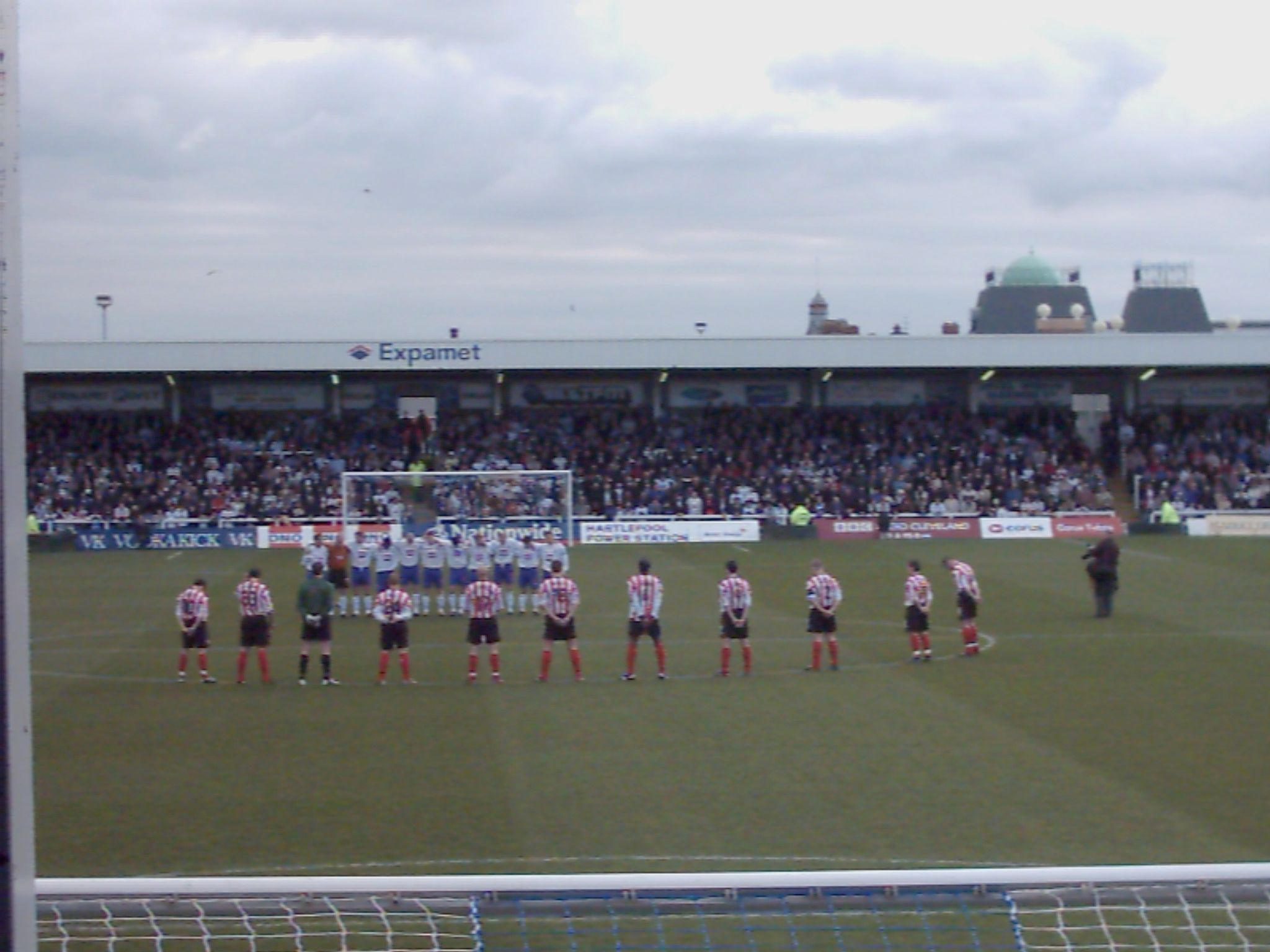
Town End.

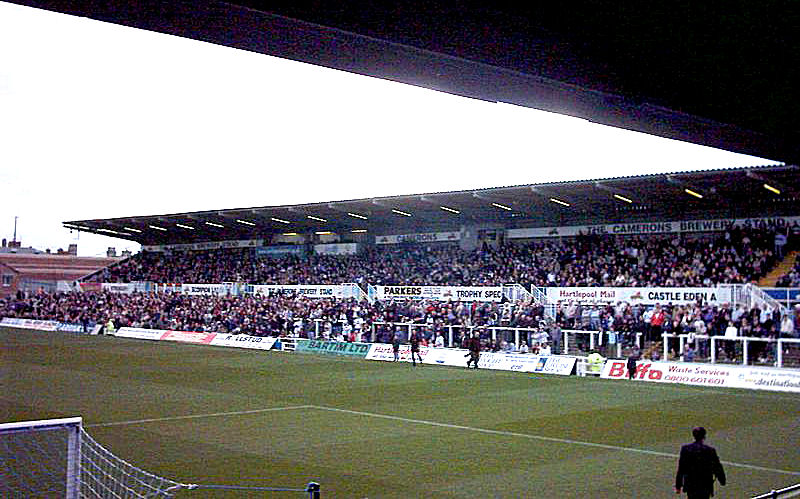
Cameron's Brewery Stand.

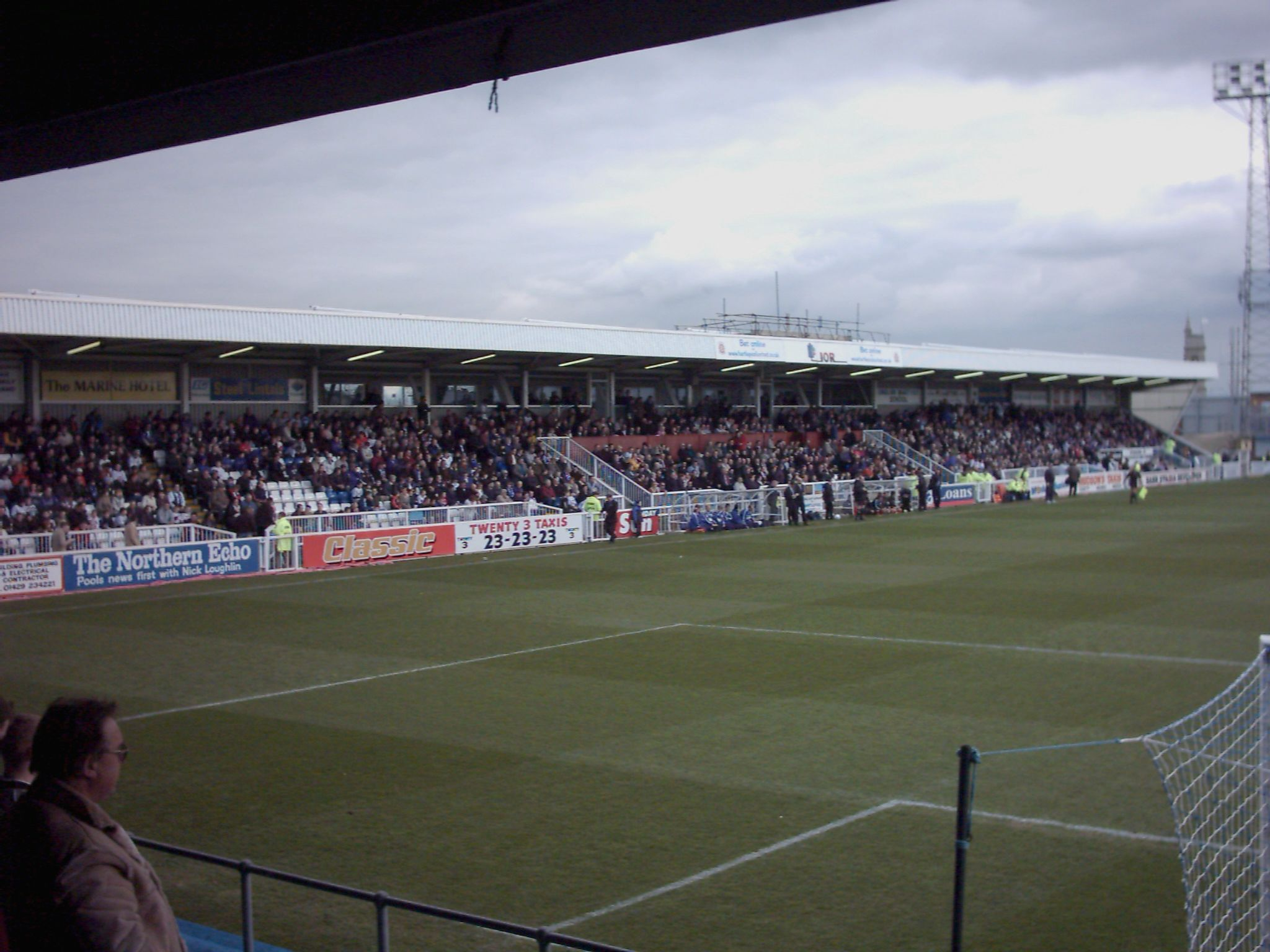
Cyril Knowles Stand.

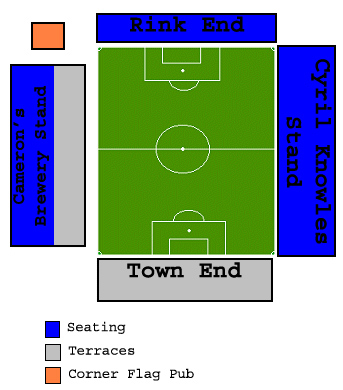
A diagram of Victoria Park

Victoria Park is a football ground in Hartlepool, County Durham, England, which is the home of National League club Hartlepool United.

The four sides of the ground are known as the Town End Terrace (official capacity 1,775), the Niramax Stand (official capacity 1,617 seated and 1,832 terraced standing), the Cyril Knowles Stand (official capacity 1,599) and the Rink End (official capacity 1,033). The Town End Terrace is a standing area behind the south goal, and usually the most vocal area of the ground. The Neale Cooper Stand (formerly the Niramax Stand is an all seating stand with a terraced paddock at the west side of the ground. The Cyril Knowles Stand is a modern all-seater stand to the east of the ground. The Rink End is also an all-seater stand containing 1,033 seats, some with an obscured view of the pitch due to supporting pillars. The Rink End is at the north end of the ground and houses only away fans.

The stadium was previously known as the Northern Gas and Power Stadium between August 2016 and June 2017 for sponsorship reasons. Additionally, the ground was called The Super 6 Stadium during the 2018–19 season and the Suit Direct Stadium from 2021 until 2024. The stadium was named as the 'Prestige Group Stadium' for the 2024–25 season.

== History ==
The land on which Victoria Park stands was originally a limestone quarry owned by the North-Eastern Railway Company. In 1886, the land was bought by West Hartlepool Rugby Football Club for the development of a new rugby ground. The ground was then named the Victoria Ground in celebration of Queen Victoria’s Diamond Jubilee. In 1908, West Hartlepool R.F.C. went bust, leaving The Victoria Ground vacant. Shortly afterwards, the ground was registered under the name of "The Hartlepools United Football Athletic Company Limited", a football team representing both the town of West Hartlepool and the original settlement of Old Hartlepool. This football team developed into Hartlepool United. From 1908 to 1910, Hartlepools United shared their ground with the amateurs of West Hartlepool until the club broke up leaving Hartlepools United as the sole occupiers of the ground.

In 1916, the ground was bombed by a German Zeppelin, destroying the main stand on Clarence Road. A small, wooden stand was built as a temporary measure with the intent to replace it with a larger, more permanent structure once funds allowed. After the war, Hartlepool tried to claim compensation from the German government in order to fund the new stand. However, these attempts failed and the temporary stand was eventually demolished in the late 1980s due to fire regulations being tightened as a result of the Bradford City fire. A number of portable cabins were put on the site of the Clarence Road stand containing dressing rooms, offices and a small number of seats until the Cyril Knowles Stand was built in 1995.

When Chesterfield F.C. installed their floodlights in 1967, it left Hartlepool United as the only Football League club not to have floodlights.

The Cyril Knowles Stand was named after the former Tottenham Hotspur defender who managed Hartlepool from January 1990 until June 1991. He had built side that won promotion from the Fourth Division in the 1990–91 season, but had to hand over managerial duties to coach Alan Murray in February 1991 due to brain cancer. Knowles retired in June 1991 after his declining health meant that he was no longer well enough to manage the club and died two months later at the age of 47.

In 1986, Middlesbrough faced with liquidation were locked out of their ground, Ayresome Park, and the authorities had granted Middlesbrough continued League status on the proviso that they could fulfil their first fixture of the season. On the day of their first game, two games were played at the ground with Hartlepool playing their game at an earlier kick-off. 3,690 Middlesbrough supporters made the short journey to Hartlepool to see them draw 2–2 against Port Vale.

In 1998, West Hartlepool R.F.C. were allowed to once again share the ground, signing an agreement that was to run until 2001, and brought a number of executive boxes with them from their previous ground, Brierton Lane. These boxes were added to the rear of the Cyril Knowles stand. West Hartlepool R.F.C. moved out in 1999. In 1996, the ground was renamed Victoria Park to reflect the large number of improvements that had been made to the infrastructure and facilities. Among the improvements were two new stands (the Cyril Knowles Stand and the Town End), new dressing rooms and offices in the old Clock Garages building to the northeast of the ground and major work on the condition of the pitch. Since 2003, groundsman Dave Brown has received an annual nomination for Groundsman of the Year awards due to the excellent state of the pitch. In 2006, Hartlepool made a bid to buy the lease of the land that the ground is on. However, Hartlepool Borough Council rejected this proposal claiming that accepting the offer would be premature in light of recent development in the area around Victoria Park.

The ground has been relatively free from crowd trouble. However, when matches were played against local rivals Darlington, there was some. One of the most notorious incidents of crowd trouble came in 2000 during Hartlepool's play-off match against Darlington. Darlington manager Dave Hodgson was struck with a coin and Marco Gabbiadini was reportedly punched by a fan after the match. There have also been some Health and Safety issues regarding fans refusing to sit in the seating areas. This has forced the club to employ strict ground regulations.

In 1957, the ground attracted its record attendance of 17,264 for a 3rd Round FA Cup Game against a Manchester United team managed by Matt Busby, which Hartlepool narrowly lost 4–3. This was regarded by Busby in his biography as being one of the most exciting matches he had ever witnessed. Manchester United later returned later to Victoria Park for a heavily attended friendly, only to lose 6–2. Hartlepool played three Premier League sides in cup competitions at Victoria Park in 2008–09, two of whom, West Bromwich Albion and Stoke City, were beaten by Hartlepool. Their fourth-round tie against West Ham United was televised live on ITV and attracted over 500 million viewers worldwide, Hartlepool losing 2–0 in front of a crowd of 6,849.

After a successful season ticket campaign at the start of the 2011–12 season, which saw the club sell over 5,000 season tickets, Hartlepool had the highest percentage of their ground full in their division.

In the latter half of the 2012–13 season, Gateshead played home games at Victoria Park after drainage problems at Gateshead International Stadium.

Middlesbrough U21s began to play their home games at Victoria Park in the 2013–14 season.

Following the death of former Hartlepool United manager Neale Cooper in 2018, the club decided to rename from the Cameron's Brewery Stand to the Neale Cooper Stand.

== Location ==
The ground is on Clarence Road, close to the town centre. This allows visitors access to a large range of pubs. The most popular pub for visiting fans is the Corner Flag, between the Cameron's Brewery Stand and the Rink End. The Victoria Suite is also at the ground but is for members only. The ground's location also makes parking easier as it is near several large car parks such as the Jackson's Landing and other retail parks. The ground is ½ mile from Hartlepool railway station.

Victoria Park is located next door to Morrisons and is 0.7 miles from the Middleton Grange Shopping Centre. The ground is also located near the Hartlepool Marina which has an array of pubs and restaurants.

There is some street parking available near the ground, as well as some paid car parks.

== Sponsorship deals ==
The stadium was previously known as the Northern Gas and Power Stadium between August 2016 and June 2017. Additionally, the ground was called The Super 6 Stadium during the 2018–19 season for sponsorship reasons. On 12 November 2021, Victoria Park was renamed the ‘Suit Direct Stadium’. The stadium was named as the 'Prestige Group Stadium' for the 2024–25 season.

== International matches ==
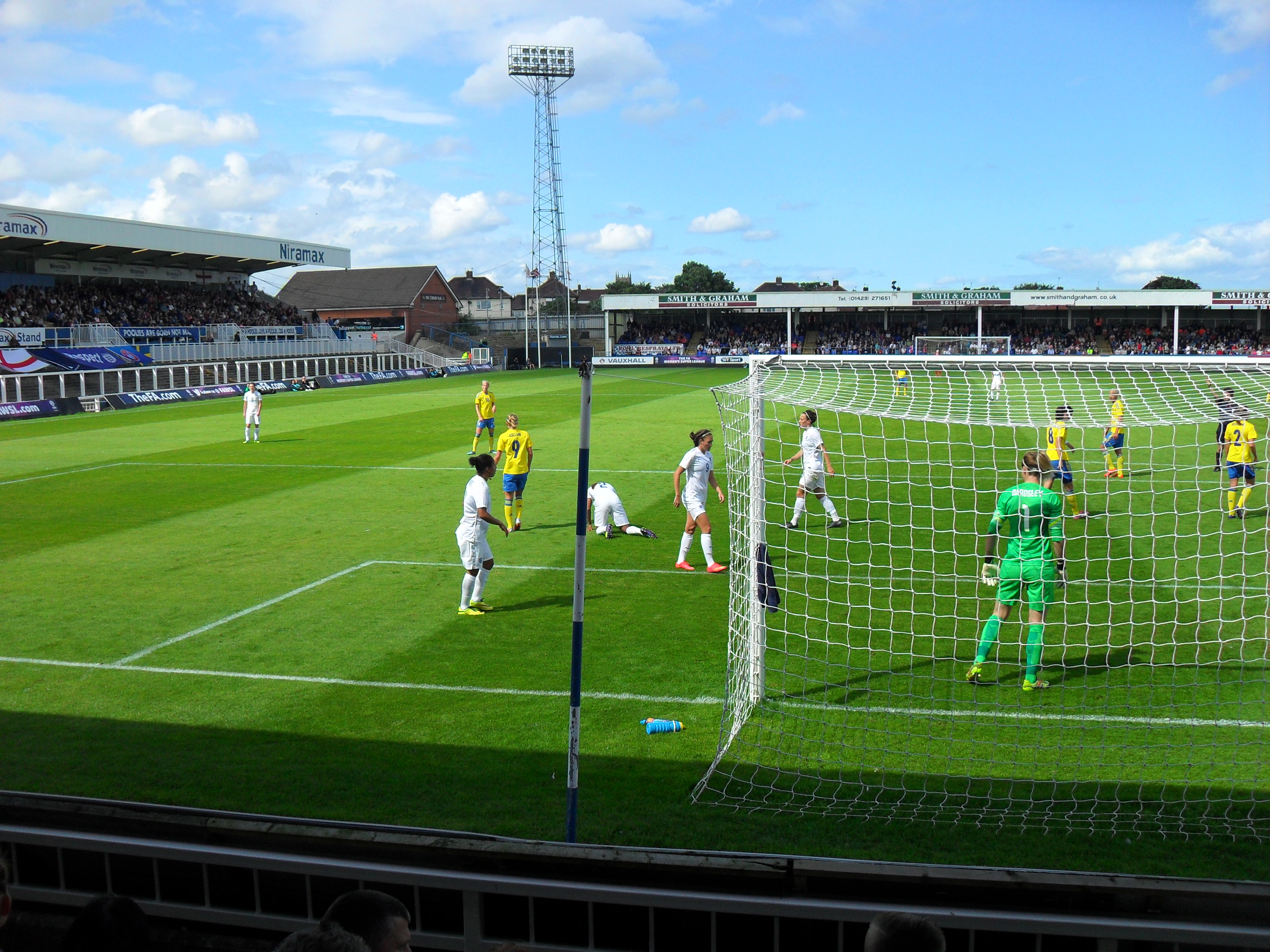
England versus Sweden, 2014

In December 2004, local player David Wheater scored the winning goal in England under-18s' 1–0 friendly win over Scotland under-18s, played before 4,959 fans at Victoria Park. England under-18s lost 2–0 to their French counterparts at Victoria Park in September 2006, after two goals from David Ngog. Danny Welbeck and Danny Drinkwater scored in England under-18s' 2–0 win over Austria in April 2008, before 2,306 supporters at Victoria Park.

The England women's national football team beat Sweden 4–0 in an August 2014 friendly at Victoria Park. It was the female England team's first game in the North East since a 1–1 draw with Italy at Roker Park, Sunderland in November 1995. Several of the English players came from the North East, including Jordan Nobbs whose father Keith had played 327 times for Hartlepool United. Fara Williams broke the national record by winning her 130th cap in the match.

== In the media ==
The ground was used as the location in The Fast Show for a Ron Manager sketch. Paul Whitehouse, who plays Ron Manager, sits in the Rink End stand as he talks about a typical Saturday afternoon in football.

== Other uses ==
Victoria Park is one of the town's most popular conferencing venues, offering a range of facilities to suit a variety of needs, with three different suites (The Centenary Suite, CK Suite and the Maidens Suite).

Victoria Park has also been used for employability training to help improve the town's unemployment figures and has an after-school programme which teaches children literacy and numeracy skills.

The ground was the home of Pitch Invasion Festival in May 2012. It saw around 5,000 people attend the two-day event which had live music across two stages and a small funfair. James Arthur played the festival with his band a few months before he won talent show The X Factor.
