= Mark Sampson =

Welsh footballer and coach

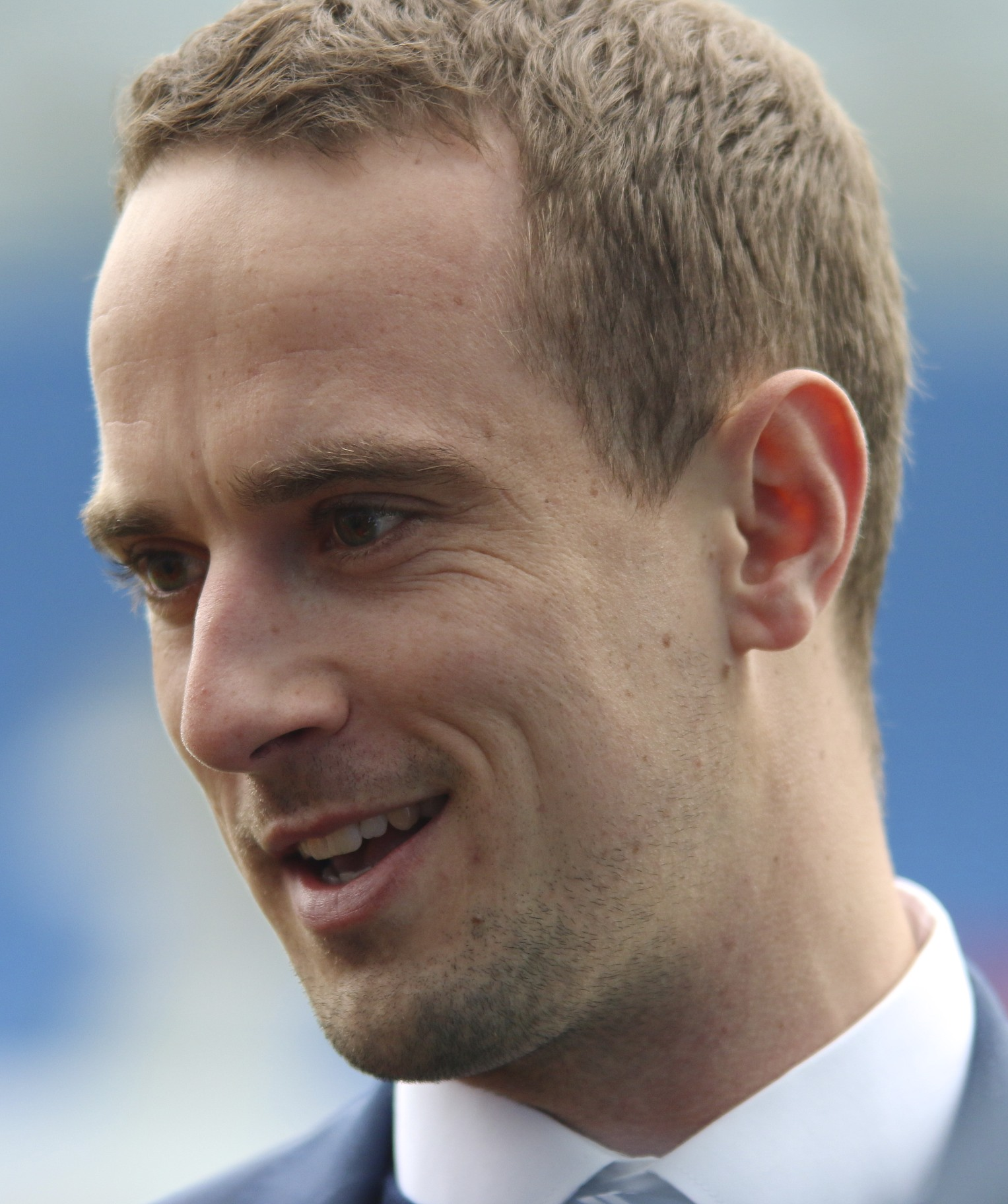
- Sampson in 2014

Personal information
- Full name: Mark Geraint Sampson
- Date of birth: 18 October 1982 (age 44)
- Place of birth: Creigiau, Wales
- Position: Defender

Senior career*
Years	Team	Apps	(Gls)
- Cardiff Corinthians

Managerial career
- 2008–2010: Taff's Well
- 2009–2013: Bristol Academy
- 2013–2017: England Women
- 2019: Stevenage (caretaker)
- * Club domestic league appearances and goals

Mark Geraint Sampson (born 18 October 1982) is a Welsh football coach who was most recently a first team coach at Stevenage.

Born in Creigiau, Wales, Sampson played amateur football for Cardiff Corinthians. He began his coaching career with Cardiff City at youth levels before a spell with Swansea City at their centre of excellence. Sampson began his management career with Taff's Well in 2008. He moved into the women's game in 2009, becoming manager at Bristol Academy. He led the club to their highest league finish, as well as two cup finals. In 2013, Sampson was announced as the new manager of England women. After winning the Cyprus Cup in 2015, he led England to a third place finish at that year's World Cup. He was dismissed by the FA in 2017. He moved to Stevenage in 2019 as first-team coach and had a brief spell as caretaker manager with the club. Sampson departed the club in 2021.

== Playing career ==
Born and raised in Creigiau, a suburb of Cardiff, Sampson played amateur football for a host of clubs in Wales including Cardiff Corinthians.

== Management career ==
=== Early years ===
After completing a BA in sports development at the University of Wales Institute, Sampson was employed by the Football Association of Wales Trust in 2003 as a coach co-ordinator. He went on to become a coach, teaching youth players at Cardiff City.

In 2007, Sampson became head of Swansea City's centre of excellence whilst the club was under the management of Roberto Martínez, working there until 2009. He was appointed manager of Welsh Football League club Taff's Well in November 2008, having previously been youth team coach at the club.

=== Bristol Academy ===
The following year, he was also appointed manager of FA Women's Premier League club Bristol Academy. He led the club to finish as runners up in the 2013 FA WSL season, the club's best-ever finish, and to FA Women's Cup final for the first time in the clubs history in 2010–11 and repeated the achievement again in 2012–13. Sampson was recognised as FAWSL Coach of the Year in 2011 in recognition of leading the club to their first ever appearance in the UEFA Women's Champions League, an achievement he repeated in 2013 when the club again reached the UEFA Women`s Champions League.

=== England women ===
In December 2013 Sampson was appointed manager of the England women's team. In March 2015 England won the Cyprus Cup. In the 2015 FIFA Women's World Cup later in the year, he led England to the semi-finals, marking the first time England had won a match beyond the group stage of a World Cup. After losing the semi-final to Japan, England secured victory in the match for third place, beating Germany for the first time in 21 games. Post the tournament Sampson was recognised for Englands record breaking achievement by being nominated for Women's Coach of the Year at the 2015 Ballon d'Dor FIFA Football Awards.

Following the 2015 FIFA Women's World Cup, Sampson became one of the youngest coaches in the UK to complete the UEFA Pro Licence.

In the UEFA Women's Euro 2017, Sampson again led England to the semi-finals. England began the tournament with a 6-0 opening day win against rivals Scotland. They went on to defeat Spain 2-0 and Portugal by two goals to one to reach the quarter finals against France. England beat France for the first time in 43 years thanks to a goal from Jodie Taylor as the Lionesses won 1-0 and earned a place in the semi final against tournament hosts Netherlands. In the semi final England came up short and were defeated 3-0 by the eventual tournament winners.

As a result of their achievements England Women reached a new high in the FIFA rankings as the Lionesses climbed to second after strong Euro 2017 showing.

On 20 September 2017, Sampson was sacked as the manager of the England women's national team because of what the FA described as, "clear evidence of inappropriate and unacceptable behaviour by a coach" during his tenure as the manager of Bristol Academy prior to his appointment as England coach in 2014. An FA investigation into the allegations that led to his dismissal had concluded in 2014 that, "he did not pose a risk working in the game" but the decision to terminate his employment was taken when senior FA figures read the full report in 2017.

This sacking followed FA investigations into allegations of racist behaviour and remarks by Sampson, brought by Eniola Aluko. The FA oversaw two investigations, the second of them an independent investigation by a barrister, Katharine Newton, which cleared Sampson. The FA reasserted, in their press release regarding his dismissal, that they continued to have confidence in those findings and his dismissal was unrelated to that issue saying, "In respect of investigations into specific allegations made by Eniola Aluko in 2016, The FA stands by the findings of the independent barrister Katharine Newton's investigation. Sampson subsequently brought an unfair dismissal case against the FA.

On 18 October 2017, the FA apologised to players Eniola Aluko and Drew Spence after Katharine Newton concluded, on a balance of probabilities, in a third investigation that Mark Sampson made comments that were "discriminatory on the grounds of race". The FA agreed to pay a "significant " financial settlement to Sampson in January 2019, on the week his claim for unfair dismissal was due to be heard in court.

=== Stevenage ===
Mark Sampson was appointed as a first-team coach of Stevenage on 4 July 2019. Sampson was appointed as caretaker manager on 9 September 2019 after the sacking of Dino Maamria. On 15 December 2019 Stevenage announced that Graham Westley would return for this fourth stint as Stevenage's head coach, restoring Sampson to his previous role as a first team coach. During his oversight the club played 18 matches, winning five, with seven draws, and six losses. Stevenage finished the 2019–20 season in 23rd place, but were reprieved from relegation thanks to Bury's expulsion from League One, and after Macclesfield Town was deducted four points for failing to both pay their players' wages and to fulfil a fixture. The following season Stevenage finished in 14th place. Sampson remained with the club until his departure on 8 November 2021.

== Honours ==
Bristol Academy

- Women's FA Cup runner-up: 2010–11, 2012–13

England Women

- FIFA Women's World Cup third place: 2015
- Cyprus Women's Cup: 2015
