= Jordan Nobbs =

English footballer (born 1992)

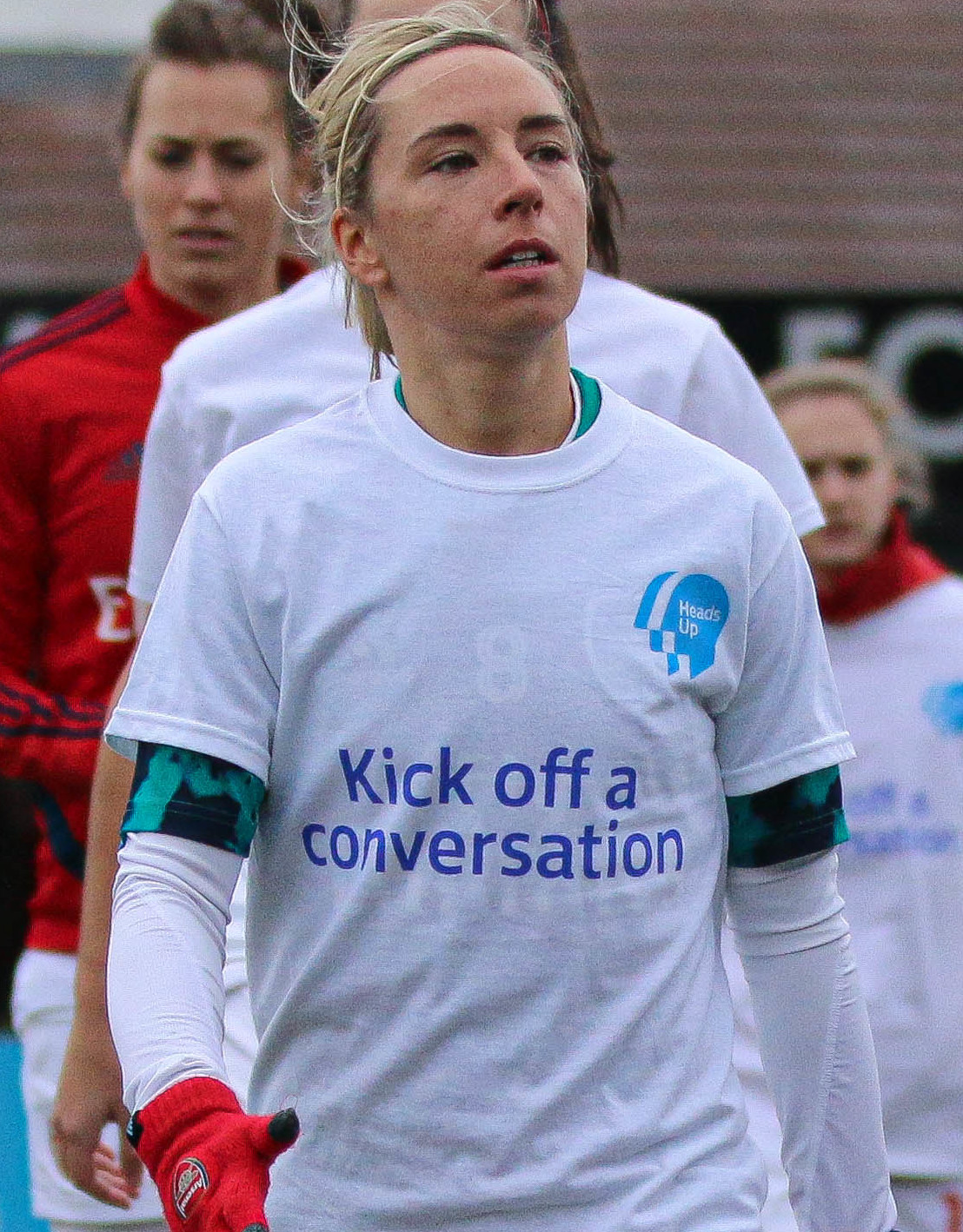
- Nobbs with Arsenal in 2020

Personal information
- Full name: Jordan Nobbs
- Date of birth: 8 December 1992 (age 33)
- Place of birth: Stockton-on-Tees, England
- Height: 5 ft 3 in (1.59 m)
- Position: Midfielder

Team information
- Current team: Newcastle United
- Number: 4

Youth career
- 2000–2008: Sunderland

Senior career*
Years	Team	Apps	(Gls)
2008–2011	Sunderland	29	(9)
2010–2023	Arsenal	157	(52)
2023–2025	Aston Villa	53	(7)
2025–	Newcastle United	20	(5)

International career^{‡}
2008	England U17	6	(0)
2008–2011	England U19	31	(13)
2010	England U20	3	(0)
2012	England U23	3	(1)
2013–	England	71	(8)
Medal record
Women's football
Representing England
FIFA Women's World Cup
Runner-up	2023 Australia and New Zealand
Bronze medal – third place	2015 Canada
UEFA–CONMEBOL Finalissima
Winner	2023 England
- * Club domestic league appearances and goals as of 12 December 2025 ‡ National team caps and goals as of 19 February 2023

Jordan Nobbs (born 8 December 1992) is an English professional footballer who plays for Newcastle United W.F.C. in the Women's Super League 2.

She started her career with Sunderland, before spending 13 years with Arsenal. Nobbs joined Aston Villa in 2023 and spent two years at the club.

Nobbs has played for the England women's national team at the youth and has 71 caps at the senior level.

On 5 October 2024, Nobbs broke the Women's Super League appearance record, after she played in her 193rd match. The individual record had been held by Chelsea midfielder Sophie Ingle, who was at the time out with an ACL injury.

== Club career ==
=== Early career ===
Nobbs joined the Sunderland centre of excellence aged eight, and was also attached to Middlesbrough as a youngster. In the 2008–09 season, she emulated her father Keith Nobbs by representing Durham schools, while a pupil at Sedgefield Community College.

=== Sunderland ===
==== 2008–09: Call up to first team ====
Upon turning 16 in December 2008, Nobbs began playing for the Sunderland first-team. In her first season in senior football, Nobbs helped Sunderland win the FA Women's Premier League Northern Division and reach the 2009 FA Women's Cup final, where they were narrowly beaten by Arsenal.

==== 2009–2011: Awards and transfer ====
The following season, Nobbs was an "integral" part of Sunderland's success as they finished fifth in their first season back at the top level. In November 2009, Nobbs scored against Arsenal, as Sunderland inflicted only the Gunners' second league defeat in more than six years. At the end of the season, Nobbs was named manager's and player's player of the year at Sunderland. She also won the 2010 FA Young Player of the Year award.

When Sunderland's bid to join the FA WSL failed, Nobbs was approached by several of the leading clubs in the country. She eventually signed for Arsenal in August 2010. With Arsenal awaiting the impending arrival of the FA WSL which would become a summer competition for the first six seasons, Nobbs continued to play for Sunderland in the 2010–11 Premier League. Sunderland won the league that season but were not promoted as the WSL lineup was already confirmed.

=== Arsenal ===
==== 2010–13 ====
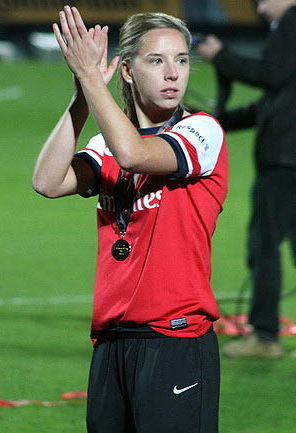
Nobbs with Arsenal in 2012

Nobbs made her Arsenal debut in Serbia in September 2010, as a second-half substitute in a 3–1 UEFA Women's Champions League win over ZFK Masinac. She scored her first goal in the home leg, the sixth goal in a 9–0 win. She appeared in all eight of Arsenal's games starting the last five as Arsenal lost out at the semi-final stage to Lyon. On 21 May 2011, Nobbs started for Arsenal as they won the Women's FA Cup final beating Bristol Academy 2–0 at the Ricoh Arena. Nobbs played a key role in the inaugural WSL season as Arsenal won the title while playing 12 of the 14 games, making 9 starts and scoring 1 goal. At the completion of the WSL, the rebranded League Cup was played with Nobbs starting the quarter and semi finals and coming on as a sub for Danielle Carter after 69 minutes in the final against Birmingham City which Arsenal won 4–1.

In the 2012 season, Nobbs appeared in seven of Arsenal's eight Champions League matches scoring four goals in the process as Arsenal were knocked out at the semi-final stage for the second consecutive season. Nobbs featured in 13 of Arsenal's 14 matches as they retained the title without losing a match, Nobbs also improved her end product, scoring 5 goals and finishing as the joint sixth top scorer in the league.

For the third consecutive season, Nobbs featured as Arsenal reached the semi-final stage of the Champions League, but once again fell short of the final this time to VfL Wolfsburg. Nobbs scored in the 2013 FA Cup final as Arsenal beat Bristol Academy 3–0 at the Keepmoat Stadium. Nobbs was ever present in an ultimately disappointing WSL campaign which saw them fail to qualify for the 2014–15 Champions League, although their 2012 WSL win had already qualified them for the 2013–14 Champions League. Nobbs finished as Arsenal's joint top scorer alongside striker Danielle Carter with six goals. Nobbs played every game as Arsenal won the 2013 WSL Cup, beating Lincoln 2–0 in the final.

==== 2014–15 ====
Nobbs played in Arsenal's first four Champions League matches, scoring four goals, but then picked up a back injury in pre-season, leading her miss the entirety of Arsenal's victorious FA Cup campaign. She did not return during the summer season until 6 July for a substitute appearance in a WSL Cup tie with Chelsea which Arsenal won 3–0. Without Nobbs, Arsenal had only won one of their first five games and were bottom of the league with just a point after four games. By the end of the season, despite only playing nine games, she had scored five goals which left her as Arsenal's joint top scorer with Casey Stoney. Arsenal also reached the WSL Cup final with Nobbs playing the last two group matches, the semi-final and the final, but lost 1–0 to Manchester City.

The 2015 WSL was another injury hit season for Nobbs, picking up a hamstring injury 10 minutes into a 0–0 draw with Chelsea on 30 April, just a month before the 2015 World Cup in Canada. On the post-World Cup resumption, Arsenal won the 2015 League Cup, with Nobbs scoring two goals in the final, as well as picking up the Player of the Match award.

==== 2016–17 ====
In the 2016 season, Arsenal required penalties to beat Birmingham City in the FA Cup round of 16 to advance, with Nobbs scoring the decisive kick. In May 2016, Nobbs featured in the 2016 FA Cup final which Arsenal won 1–0 against Chelsea. The WSL season was once again ultimately disappointing for Arsenal, finishing 3rd. Arsenal manager, Pedro Martinez Losa praised Nobbs after a good performance against Notts County in July, "There's no question about the importance of Jordan Nobbs and what level she can get to. We know her quality and because of how young she is she brings a lot of energy to the team." Arsenal's slim title chances ended in a 1–0 defeat to Man City in September, Losa once again praised Nobbs and said, "I think mainly Jordan Nobbs did very well for us in the game. I think she did a fantastic job. Obviously all the players want to do a fantastic job. There's not one player who wants to lose the ball or miss a pass. But I think Jordan is the one that is stepping up in terms of mentality, competitiveness and also football."

Due to the WSL switching from summer to winter, a shorter season was played in the spring known as the Spring Series. Nobbs played every game as Arsenal made a slow start to the season with two draws against Sunderland and Liverpool. Nobbs scored in the 81st minute against Liverpool to make it 4–3 but a late equaliser denied Arsenal the win. In a tight match against Man City, Nobbs scored a 75th minute free kick from 30 yards to clinch victory. In the final game, Nobbs scored the second goal as Arsenal thrashed Bristol City 5–0. Despite going through the campaign unbeaten, Arsenal fell short of the title, finishing second to Chelsea on goal difference. Nobbs finished as Arsenal's joint top scorer and joint third overall.

==== 2017–18 season ====
On 24 April 2017, Arsenal beat Liverpool 3–0 with Nobbs scoring two, bringing her total to a half-century of goals for Arsenal. The league season was once again ultimately disappointing as Arsenal missed out on Champions League football by a point to Man City. Nobbs started every game and scored four goals as Arsenal won the 2017–18 WSL Cup. Nobbs scored two goals in the 5–2 group win against Millwall. In the quarter-final, Nobbs scored as Arsenal beat Sunderland 3–1.

==== 2018–19 season ====
Nobbs suffered an injury on 18 November 2018 in Arsenal's 4–0 win against Everton. A day later, it was revealed she had ruptured the anterior cruciate ligament in her left knee and was a doubt until the new season.

==== 2019–20 season ====
Nobbs made her return from injury as a half-time substitute in a pre-season friendly against Tottenham Hotspur on 25 August 2019, scoring the third goal in a 6–0 win. Nobbs went on to make her WSL return 295 days on from her anterior cruciate ligament injury as a substitute for Viktoria Schnaderbeck in Arsenal's 2–1 win against West Ham United on 8 September. On 21 April 2020, she signed a new contract.

==== 2020–21 season ====
On 1 August 2021, Nobbs was carried off on a stretcher during the second half of the 2–1 win in a pre-season friendly against Chelsea at the Emirates Stadium after her ankle was caught in a challenge from Erin Cuthbert. On 3 August, Arsenal reported that she had suffered an injury to the ligaments of her right ankle.

==== 2021–22 season ====
Nobbs made 13 WSL appearances (including 4 from the bench). On 24 April Nobbs scored her 50th WSL goal against Everton. In a WSL game against Aston Villa on 1 May Nobbs was subbed off due to an knee injury which also led to her not being selected for the England 2022 Euros squad.

==== 2022–23 season ====
Nobbs made 9 appearances in the WSL, scoring 2 goals. She scored against FC Zurich in the UEFA Women's Champions League group stage which was nominated for goal of the tournament.

=== Aston Villa ===
On 5 January 2023, it was announced that Nobbs had signed an 18-month contract with Aston Villa with a further option to extend. On 12 February, Nobbs scored a hat-trick in a 6–2 away win against Brighton & Hove Albion. On 24 August, it was announced that Nobbs would change number from 88 to 8. In the 2023–24 season in the away game against Tottenham Hotspur, Nobbs scored the winning goal in the 2–1 victory.

She left Aston Villa upon the conclusion of the 2024–25 season on 10 May 2025.

=== Newcastle United ===
On 12 July 2025, Women's Super League 2 club Newcastle United announced that Nobbs would be joining them for the 2025–26 season on a permanent deal. She won the Women's Super League 2 Player of the Month and the WSL2 PFA Fans' Player of the Month awards for December.

== International career ==
=== Youth ===
Nobbs was called into the England U-15 squad as a 12-year-old. Aged 13, she captained England U-15s against Wales U-15s and scored in a 2–0 victory. At the age of 14, Nobbs had progressed to captaining England's U-17 team.

Nobbs then captained England to fourth place at the 2008 Under-17 World Cup in New Zealand. In July 2009 Nobbs played a starring role as England won the 2009 European Under-19 Championship in Belarus, scoring in the final win over Sweden.

In 2010, Nobbs helped England reach the final of the 2010 European Under-19 Championship in Macedonia, where they lost their title to France. Later that summer, Nobbs played in all three of England's matches at the 2010 Under-20 World Cup in Germany.

=== Senior ===
In June 2011, Nobbs was in the senior England party which visited 10 Downing Street ahead of the 2011 FIFA Women's World Cup. She received her first call up to the senior England squad for the final UEFA Women's Euro 2013 qualifying match against Croatia at Banks's Stadium in Walsall on 19 September 2012.

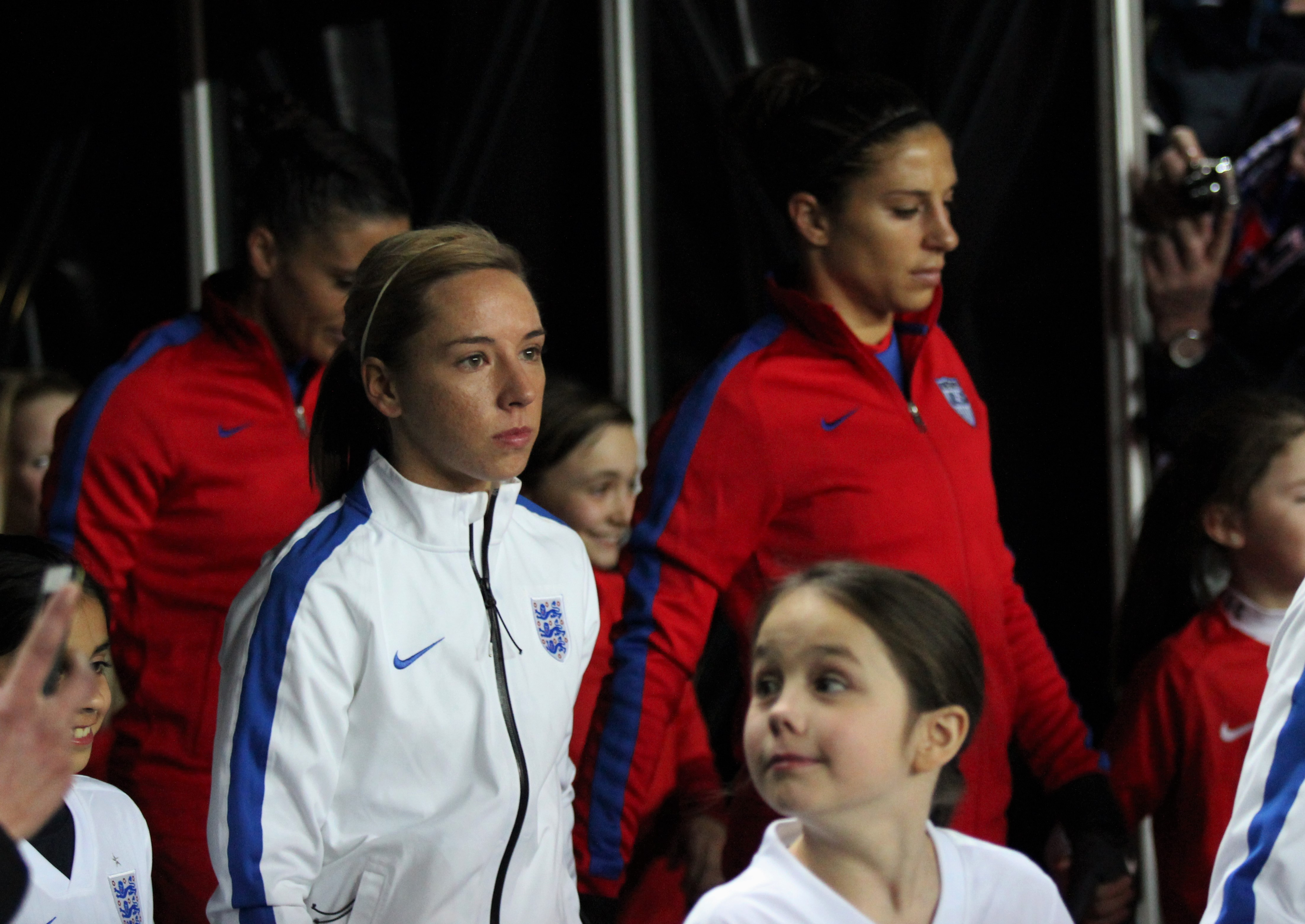
Nobbs (left) featuring for England in 2015

Nobbs made her senior international debut at the 2013 Cyprus Cup, scoring England's first goal in their 4–2 win over Italy on 6 March 2013. She scored her next goal against Wales in October 2013's World Cup qualifier at The Den. Nobbs was made England vice-captain at the 2015 Cyprus Cup, and led the team to winning the trophy as captain Steph Houghton was out injured. Nobbs was named in the squad for the Women's World Cup in 2015, but only played one match due to injury.

Vice-captain Nobbs was ruled out of the 2019 Women's World Cup after rupturing her anterior cruciate ligament in November 2018. Nobbs took on a role as a BBC pundit for the World Cup and as a columnist for 90 Minutes magazine. Nobbs also missed out on the Great Britain women's Olympic football team for the 2020 Olympics. In May 2022, Nobbs picked up a knee ligament strain which ruled her out of the 2022 Women's Euros.

Nobbs was allotted 180 when the FA announced their legacy numbers scheme to honour the 50th anniversary of England's inaugural international.

On 31 May 2023, Nobbs was named in the squad for the 2023 FIFA Women's World Cup in July 2023.

== Personal life ==
As of 2025, Nobbs' girlfriend is Erin Caldwell who is a singer, actress and dancer from Scotland. The couple announced their engagement on 12 May 2026.

== Career statistics ==
=== Club ===
As of match played 30 April 2025

Appearances and goals by club, season and competition
Club	Season	League			FA Cup		League Cup		Continental		Total	
Club	Season	Division	Apps	Goals	Apps	Goals	Apps	Goals	Apps	Goals	Apps	Goals
Arsenal	2011	FA WSL	12	1	4	0	0	0	8	1	24	2
Arsenal	2012	FA WSL	13	5	1	0	4	1	7	4	25	10
Arsenal	2013	FA WSL	14	6	0	0	5	2	8	2	27	10
Arsenal	2014	FA WSL	9	5	0	0	5	0	4	4	18	9
Arsenal	2015	FA WSL	7	1	0	0	5	2	0	0	12	3
Arsenal	2016	FA WSL	14	4	0	0	3	0	0	0	17	4
Arsenal	2017	FA WSL	8	4	0	0	0	0	0	0	8	4
Arsenal	2017–18	FA WSL	17	3	3	2	7	4	0	0	27	9
Arsenal	2018–19	FA WSL	8	9	0	0	2	0	0	0	10	9
Arsenal	2019–20	FA WSL	14	5	3	2	7	1	4	0	28	8
Arsenal	2020–21	FA WSL	16	5	4	2	0	0	0	0	20	7
Arsenal	2021–22	FA WSL	16	2	3	0	1	0	7	1	27	3
Arsenal	2022–23	WSL	9	2	0	0	0	0	5	1	14	3
Arsenal	Total		157	52	18	6	39	10	43	13	257	81
Aston Villa	2022–23	WSL	11	4	3	0	1	0	—		15	4
Aston Villa	2023–24	WSL	22	2	1	0	5	0	—		28	2
Aston Villa	2024–25	WSL	18	1	3	0	1	0	—		22	1
Aston Villa	Total		51	7	7	0	7	0	—		65	7
Newcastle United	2025–26	WSL2	16	5	2	0	2	0	—		12	2
Career total			217	61	26	6	48	10	43	13	331	89

=== International ===
As of match played 22 September 2023

Appearances and goals by national team and year
National team	Year	Apps	Goals
England	2013	6	3
England	2014	5	0
England	2015	13	0
England	2016	6	0
England	2017	19	4
England	2018	3	0
England	2019	9	0
England	2020	3	0
England	2021	3	1
England	2022	1	0
England	2023	3	0
Total		71	8

Scores and results list England's goal tally first, score column indicates score after each Nobbs goal.

List of international goals scored by Jordan Nobbs
No.	Date	Venue	Opponent	Score	Result	Competition
1	6 March 2013	GSP Stadium, Nicosia, Cyprus	Italy	1–0	4–2	2013 Cyprus Cup
2	26 October 2013	The Den, London, England	Wales	1–0	2–0	World Cup 2015 qualification
3	31 October 2013	Adana 5 Ocak Stadium, Adana, Turkey	Turkey	4–0	4–0	World Cup 2015 qualification
4	1 March 2017	Talen Energy Stadium, Chester, USA	France	1–0	1–2	2017 SheBelieves Cup
5	10 June 2017	Tissot Arena, Biel, Switzerland	Switzerland	1–0	4–0	Friendly
6	19 July 2017	Stadion Galgenwaard, Netherlands	Scotland	5–0	6–0	UEFA Women's Euro 2017
7	19 September 2017	Prenton Park, England	Russia	3–0	6–0	2019 World Cup qualifying
8	30 November 2021	Keepmoat Stadium, Doncaster, England	Latvia	10–0	20–0	2023 FIFA Women's World Cup qualification

== Honours ==
Sunderland

- FA Women's Premier League Northern Division: 2008–09
- FA Women's Cup runner-up: 2008–09

Arsenal

- FA WSL: 2011, 2012, 2018–19; runners-up: 2021–22
- FA Women's Cup: 2010–11, 2012–13, 2013–14, 2015–16; runners-up: 2017–18, 2020–21
- FA WSL Cup: 2011, 2012, 2013, 2015, 2017–18; runners-up: 2018–19, 2019–20

England U19

- UEFA Women's Under-19 Championship: 2009; runner-up 2010

England

- FIFA Women's World Cup runner-up: 2023; third place: 2015
- Women's Finalissima: 2023
- Arnold Clark Cup: 2022, 2023
- Cyprus Cup: 2013, 2015

Individual

- FA Young Player of the Year: 2010
- PFA Team of the Year: 2013–14, 2016–17
- FA Player of the Year: 2016
- FA Players' Player of the Year: 2017
- London Football Awards London Women's Player of the Year: 2018
- PFA Fan's Player of the Month: October 2018 September 2019
- FA Women's Super League Player of the Month: February 2023
