= 2013 FA Women's Cup final =

English football cup final

- The match programme cover
- Event: 2012–13 FA Women's Cup
Arsenal	Bristol Academy
3	0
- Date: 26 May 2013
- Venue: Keepmoat Stadium, Doncaster
- Player of the Match: Jordan Nobbs (Arsenal)
- Referee: Jane Simms
- Attendance: 4,988

The 2013 FA Women's Cup final was the 43rd final of the FA Women's Cup, England's primary cup competition for women's football teams. The showpiece event was the 20th to be played directly under the auspices of the Football Association (FA). The final was contested between Arsenal Ladies and Bristol Academy on 26 May 2013 at Keepmoat Stadium in Doncaster. Holders Arsenal made its 12th final win. The win marked the first team trophy for new head coach Shelley Kerr.

== Match details ==
26 May 2013
15:00 BST

Arsenal	3–0	Bristol Academy
Houghton 2'; Nobbs 72'; White 90+4'	Report

Keepmoat Stadium, Doncaster
Attendance: 4,988
Referee: Jane Simms

Arsenal	Bristol Academy

GK	1	(Republic of Ireland) Emma Byrne
DF	22	(England) Alex Scott
DF	7	(Republic of Ireland) Ciara Grant	(substituted off) 90+1'
DF	5	(England) Gilly Flaherty
DF	14	(Scotland) Jen Beattie	(substituted off) 90+1'
MF	8	(England) Jordan Nobbs
MF	2	(England) Steph Houghton (c)
MF	12	(England) Gemma Davison
MF	16	(Scotland) Kim Little
FW	11	(England) Rachel Yankey	(substituted off) 86'
FW	9	(England) Ellen White
Substitutes:
GK	13	(Jamaica) Rebecca Spencer
FW	25	(England) Jade Bailey	(substituted on) 90+1'
FW	15	(England) Danielle Carter	(substituted on) 86'
DF	3	(Republic of Ireland) Yvonne Tracy	(substituted on) 90+1'
DF	24	(England) Lauren Bruton
Manager:
(England) Shelley Kerr

GK	1	(England) Siobhan Chamberlain
DF	2	(Wales) Loren Dykes	(substituted off) 74'
DF	4	(England) Jasmine Matthews
DF	19	(England) Jemma Rose
DF	3	(England) Corinne Yorston (c)
MF	20	(Wales) Natasha Harding
MF	8	(England) Alex Windell	(substituted off) 46'
MF	37	(England) Lucy Staniforth	(substituted off) 66'
MF	9	(England) Ann-Marie Heatherson
FW	15	(England) Nicky Watts
FW	7	(Spain) Natalia Pablos
Substitutes:
GK		(England) Becky Kyle
FW	13	(Spain) Laura del Río	(substituted on) 74'
DF	16	(Wales) Angharad James	(substituted on) 46'
MF	5	(England) Grace McCatty	(substituted on) 66'
DF		(Wales) Ellie Curson
Manager:
(England) Mark Sampson

Player of the match
Jordan Nobbs (Arsenal)

Assistant referees:
Helen Byrne
Rebecca Welch (Durham)
Fourth official:
Lisa Rashid

Match rules

- 90 minutes.
- 30 minutes of extra-time if necessary.
- Penalty shoot-out if scores still level.
- Five named substitutes.
- Maximum of three substitutions.
