= 2014 FA Cup =

2014 FA Cup may refer to:

- 2013–14 FA Cup
  - 2014 FA Cup final
- 2013–14 FA Women's Cup
  - 2014 FA Women's Cup final
- 2014–15 FA Cup
- 2014–15 FA Women's Cup
