= 2010–11 FA Women's Cup =

Tournament details
- Country: England; Wales

Final positions
- Champions: Arsenal
- Runners-up: Bristol Academy

The 2010–11 FA Women's Cup was the 41st season of the association football knockout competition. It is the women's national cup competition for England. The competition was won by Arsenal, who won their eleventh FA Women's Cup. They beat Bristol Academy 2–0 in the final at the Ricoh Arena in Coventry.

== Teams ==
Round	Leagues entering at this round
First round qualifying	
Second round qualifying	
Third round qualifying	Northern Combination WFL/Midland Combination WFL/South West Combination WFL/South East Combination WFL
First round proper	
Second round proper	FA WPL Northern/Southern Divisions
Third round proper	FA WPL National Division
Fourth round proper	
Fifth round proper	FA Women's Super League
Sixth round proper (QF)	
Semi–Final	
Final	

== First round qualifying ==
Tie	Home team (tier)	Score	Away team (tier)	Att.
1	Abbeytown	1–3	Dalton Girls & Ladies	
2	Accrington Girls & Ladies	1–3	Chester City	
3	AFC Trinity	6–3	Brackley Sports	
4	AFC Wimbledon	8–0	Victoire	
5	Asfordby Amateurs	0–5	Friar Lane & Epworth	
6	Billericay Town	2–0	Hoddesdon Owls	
7	Bitton	H–W	Reading Girls	
Walkover for Bitton
8	Brighouse Town	6–1	Bradford Park Avenue	
9	C&K Basildon	1–2	Colchester Town	
10	California	2–1	Ashington CFC	
11	Christchurch	2–4	New Forest	
12	Crusaders	5–0	AFC Telford United	
13	Exeter City	1–2	Keynsham Town Development	
14	Forest Of Dean	1–2	Stony Stratford Town	
15	Hampstead	5–1	Leyton	
16	Hartlepool United	0–1	Forest Green Rovers	
17	Hemsworth MW	0–3	Steel City Wanderers	
18	Henley Town	0–2	Maidenhead United	
19	Huntingdon Town	0–4	Mansfield Town	
20	Ilminster Town	2–1	Launceston	
21	Kendal Town	1–9	Morecambe	
22	Leverstock Green	1–2	Hemel Hempstead Town	
23	Lumley	H–W	Walker Central	
Walkover for Lumley
24	Market Warsop	3–0	Retford United	

Tie	Home team (tier)	Score	Away team (tier)	Att.
25	Marlow	0–7	Reading Town	
26	Middleton Athletic	9–0	Crown Newlaithes	
27	North Shields	0–11	York City	
28	Norton & Stockton Ancients	2–1	Birtley Town	
29	Parley Sports	0–11	Andover New Street	
30	Prudhoe Town	1–6	Percy Main	
31	Purbeck	2–6	Marine Academy Plymouth	
32	Redditch United	4–5	Silverdale	
33	Rothwell Town	2–0	Leighton United Vixens	
34	Runwell Hospital	0–4	Barking	
35	Rutherford	2–5	Gateshead Cleveland Hall	
36	Seahaven Harriers	5–2	Rottingdean Village	
37	St Francis 2000	2–2 (4–5 p)	RACA Tynedale	
38	Stalham Town	0–5	Bungay Town	
39	Stevenage	4–0	Baldock	
40	Swindon Spitfires	2–2 (5–4 p)	Swindon Supermarine	
41	Thorplands United	2–7	Brandon Town	
42	Tipton Town	1–1 (1–4 p)	Rugby Town	
43	Tring Athletic	0–1	Brentwood Town	
44	University Of Portsmouth	5–2	Crawley Wasps	
45	Wandgas	3–3 (2–4 p)	Haringey Borough	
46	West	3–2	St Albans City	
47	Weymouth	H–W	Winscombe	
Walkover for Weymouth

== Second round qualifying ==
Tie	Home team (tier)	Score	Away team (tier)	Att.
1	Aldershot Town	1–1 (3–1 p)	University Of Portsmouth	
2	Banbury United	0–4	Cheltenham Town	
3	Barking	3–2	Colchester Town	
4	Barnsley	2–0	Steel City Wanderers	
5	Beaconsfield SYCOB	3–4	Launton	
6	Bexhill United	1–4	Seahaven Harriers	
7	Billericay Town	1–1 (3–1 p)	Stevenage	
8	Bracknell Town	5–0	Newbury	
9	Chelmsford City	H–W	Royston Town	
Walkover for Chelmsford City.
10	Chichester City	3–0	New Forest	
11	Cogenhoe & Kingsthorpe	1–8	Rothwell Town	
12	Corby Stewarts & Lloyds	4–2	AFC Trinity	
13	Coventry Sphinx	4–3	Silverdale	
14	Crewe Alexandra	1–0	Chester City	
15	Crusaders	2–3	Walsall	
16	Dalton Girls & Ladies	3–5 (a.e.t.)	Middleton Athletic	
17	Daventry Town	8–2	Brandon Town	
18	Denham United	5–0	Hampstead	
19	Durham City	6–2	California	
20	East Preston	5–2	Haywards Heath Town	
21	Eastbourne Borough	1–7	Eastbourne Town	
22	Fakenham Town	1–2 (a.e.t.)	Arlesey Town	
23	Frome Town	1–3	Weymouth	
24	Guiseley AFC Vixens	2–1 (a.e.t.)	Ossett Albion	
25	Haverhill Rovers	1–5	Woodbridge Town	
26	Hemel Hempstead Town	2–1	Boreham Wood	
27	Hereford Pegasus	0–2	Cottage Farm Rangers	
28	Hethersett Athletic	4–4 (3–4 p)	Cambridge University	
29	Huddersfield Town	5–4	Hull City	
30	Hutton	2–3	Brentwood Town	
31	Ilminster Town	3–1	Poole Town	
32	Keynsham Town Development	5–1	Falmouth Town	
33	Larkhall Athletic	5–1	Taunton Town	
34	Long Eaton United	1–1 (4–5 p)	Mansfield Town	
35	Loughborough Foxes	1–0	Shepshed Dynamo	
36	Lumley	5–1	Redcar Town	

Tie	Home team (tier)	Score	Away team (tier)	Att.
37	Marjon Old Suttonians	0–2 (a.e.t.)	Marine Academy Plymouth	
38	Market Warsop	2–1	West Bridgford	
39	Mauritius Sports Association (MSA)	2–0	Haringey Borough	
40	Milton & Fulston	1–5	Maidstone Town	
41	Morecambe	8–0	Bolton Wanderers	
42	Norton & Stockton Ancients	2–1	RACA Tynedale	
43	Oadby & Wigston	A–W	Sandiacre Town	
Walkover for Sandiacre Town.
44	Oxford United	1–2	Maidenhead United	
45	Panthers	6–1	AFC Wimbledon	
46	Penrith AFC	3–2	Blackpool	
47	Percy Main	4–2	Forest Green Rovers	
48	Peterborough Azure	A–W	Friar Lane & Epworth	
Walkover for Friar Lane & Epworth.
49	Peterborough Sports	H–W	Hucknall Town	
Walkover for Peterborough.
50	Peterlee RA	5–1	Brandon United	
51	Ramsgate	1–4	London Corinthians	
52	Raunds Town	1–8	Kettering Town	
53	Shanklin	1–3	Andover New Street	
54	Sheffield United Community	6–0	Brighouse Town	
55	Solihull	11–0	Rugby Town	
56	Southam United	1–3	Stafford Town	
57	Stoke Lane Athletic	5–0	Reading Town	
58	Stony Stratford Town	A–W	Bitton	
Walkover for Bitton.
59	Stratford Town	2–0	Lichfield Diamonds	
60	Swindon Spitfires	3–4 (a.e.t.)	Salisbury City	
61	Teesside Sport	4–2	Gateshead Cleveland Hall	
62	Thorpe United	5–1	Bungay Town	
63	Warrington Town	1–4	Blackpool Wren Rovers	
64	West	2–1	Sawbridgeworth Town	
65	Westfield	9–1	Dorking	
66	Whitehaven	2–4	Birkenhead	
67	York City	2–6	Whitley Bay	

== Third round qualifying ==
Tie	Home team (tier)	Score	Away team (tier)	Att.
1	Aldershot Town	0–8	Havant & Waterlooville	
2	Barnsley	3–2	Scunthorpe United	
3	Billericay Town	1–5	Enfield Town	
4	Birkenhead	1–2	Salford	
5	Blackpool Wren Rovers	4–1	Durham City	
6	Bracknell Town	2–0	Cheltenham Town	
7	Brentwood Town	1–4	Tottenham Hotspur	
8	Cambridge United	4–0	Braintree Town	
9	Chelmsford City	2–2 (6–5 p)	Barking	
10	Chesham United	8–0	Launton	
11	Cottage Farm Rangers	0–8	Copsewood Coventry	
12	Cullompton Rangers	4–1	Marine Academy Plymouth	
13	Daventry Town	3–2 (a.e.t.)	Corby Stewarts & Lloyds	
14	East Preston	2–1	Westfield	
15	Forest Green Rovers	7–2	Swindon Town	
16	Friar Lane & Epworth	1–7	Loughborough Students	
17	Guiseley AFC Vixens	1–3	Sheffield United Community	
18	Huddersfield Town	1–5	Sheffield Wednesday	
19	Kettering Town	0–1	Woodbridge Town	
20	Keynsham Town Development	1–2	Larkhall Athletic	
21	Leicester City Ladies	5–0	The New Saints	
22	Lewes	5–1	Chichester City	
23	London Corinthians	0–1	Crystal Palace	
24	Loughborough Foxes	2–4	Leafield Athletic	
25	Luton Town	7–0	Rothwell Town	
26	Maidenhead United	3–4	Oxford City	
27	Maidstone Town	3–1	Eastbourne Town	
28	Middlesbrough	5–1 (a.e.t.)	Lumley	

Tie	Home team (tier)	Score	Away team (tier)	Att.
29	Middleton Athletic	3–1	Teesside Sport	
30	Milton Keynes Dons	2–2 (3–5 p)	Wolverhampton Wanderers	
31	Morecambe	4–3	Penrith AFC	
32	Mossley Hill	4–3	Peterlee RA	
33	Newquay	H–W	Ilminster Town	
Walkover for Newquay.
34	Northampton Town	3–3 (4–5 p)	Ipswich Town	
35	Norwich City	5–1	Arlesey Town	
36	Old Actonians	1–2	Hemel Hempstead Town	
37	Panthers	5–1	Mauritius Sports Association (MSA)	
38	Percy Main	0–7	Liverpool Feds	
39	Peterborough Sports	3–1	Coventry Sphinx	
40	Plymouth Argyle	6–0	Bitton	
41	Radcliffe Olympic	2–1	Mansfield Town	
42	Rotherham United	3–1	Wakefield	
43	Salisbury City	3–5	Andover New Street	
44	Seahaven Harriers	1–4	Ebbsfleet United	
45	Sheffield	2–0	Bradford City	
46	Solihull	6–1	Walsall	
47	South Durham Railway Athletic	2–2 (4–3 p)	Crewe Alexandra	
48	Southampton Saints	3–1	Gloucester City	
49	Sporting Club Albion	12–0	Market Warsop	
50	Stafford Town	1–8	Stoke City	
51	Stockport County	4–0	Norton & Stockton Ancients	
52	Stoke Lane Athletic	0–1	Weymouth	
53	Stratford Town	6–3	Sandiacre Town	
54	Thorpe United	0–3	Cambridge University	
55	West	0–4	Denham United	
56	Whitley Bay	2–1	Tranmere Rovers	

== First round proper ==
Tie	Home team (tier)	Score	Away team (tier)	Att.
1	Blackpool Wren Rovers	2–0	Salford	
2	Middleton Athletic	1–2	Whitley Bay	
3	Middlesbrough	2–0	Stockport County	
4	Mossley Hill	2–0	South Durham Railway Athletic	
5	Liverpool Feds	4–3	Morecambe	
6	Loughborough Students	5–2	Leafield Athletic	
7	Barnsley	0–2	Sheffield	
8	Sheffield United Community	3–4	Stoke City	
9	Wolverhampton Wanderers	4–0	Solihull	
10	Stratford Town	1–2	Sheffield Wednesday	
11	Radcliffe Olympic	0–3	Sporting Club Albion	
12	Daventry Town	1–11	Rotherham United	
13	Copsewood	0–2	Leicester City Ladies	
14	Ipswich Town	1–3	Cambridge	

Tie	Home team (tier)	Score	Away team (tier)	Att.
15	Peterborough	2–3	Hemel Hempstead Town	
16	Norwich City	1–6	Cambridge University	
17	Tottenham Hotspur	5–0	Chelmsford City	
18	Luton Town	4–1	Woodbridge Town	
19	Crystal Palace	6–0	Panthers	
20	East Preston & Littlehampton	0–5	Havant & Waterlooville	
21	Enfield Town	2–1	Lewes	
22	Chesham United	1–2	Denham United	
23	Ebbsfleet United	3–0	Maidstone Town	
24	Newquay	4–2	Weymouth	
25	Oxford City	1–3	Plymouth Argyle	
26	Forest Green Rovers	5–5 (2–3 p)	Andover New Street	
27	Larkhall Athletic	1–3	Southampton Saints	
28	Cullompton Rangers	4–2	Bracknell Town	

Source: BBC Sport

== Second round proper ==
Tie	Home team (tier)	Score	Away team (tier)	Att.
1	Blackpool Wren Rovers	0–6	Sheffield Wednesday	
2	Manchester City	2–3 (a.e.t.)	Mossley Hill	
3	Rochdale	3–1	Preston North End	
4	Newcastle United	2–0	Liverpool Feds	
5	Whitley Bay	1–2	Leeds City Vixens	
6	Curzon Ashton	4–1	Middlesbrough	
7	Stoke City	3–3 (3–4 p)	Cambridge	
8	Derby County	4–2	Rotherham United	
9	Sheffield	1–2	Loughborough Students	
10	Leicester City	5–1	Leicester City Ladies	
11	Wolverhampton Wanderers	2–3 (a.e.t.)	Coventry City	
12	Aston Villa	0–2	Sporting Club Albion	

Tie	Home team (tier)	Score	Away team (tier)	Att.
13	Tottenham Hotspur	1–2	Colchester United	
14	Ebbsfleet United	0–6	Gillingham	
15	Havant & Waterlooville	1–2 (a.e.t.)	Enfield Town	
14	Oxford City	1–3	Plymouth Argyle	
15	Portsmouth	6–0	Crystal Palace	
16	West Ham United	4–1	Norwich City	
17	Hemel Hempstead Town	3–3 (1–3 p)	Brighton & Hove Albion	
18	Denham United	0–8	Charlton Athletic	
19	Luton Town	2–1 (a.e.t.)	Queens Park Rangers	
20	Southampton Saints	1–0	Keynsham Town	
21	Yeovil Town	0–1	Cardiff City	
22	Newquay	2–1	Plymouth Argyle	
Tie awarded to Plymouth Argyle after Newquay fielded an ineligible player.
23	Cullompton Rangers	1–6	Andover New Street	

Source: BBC Sport

== Third round proper ==
All matches were played on 6 February 2011.

Tie	Home team (tier)	Score	Away team (tier)	Att.
1	Sporting Club Albion (4)	0–4	Millwall Lionesses (2)	
2	Coventry City (3)	1–2	Rochdale (3)	
3	Nottingham Forest (2)	4–2	Leicester City (3)	
4	Curzon Ashton (3)	1–3	Charlton Athletic (3)	
5	Gillingham (3)	3–5	Reading (2)	
6	Derby County (3)	2–0	Plymouth Argyle (4)	
7	Leeds United (2)	0–0 (4–5 p)	Blackburn Rovers (2)	
8	Colchester United (3)	2–1	Newcastle United (3)	
9	Sunderland (2)	7–2	Portsmouth (3)	
10	Andover New Street (4)	2–3	Watford (2)	
11	Cardiff City (3)	1–2	Sheffield Wednesday (4)	
12	Loughborough Students (4)	0–4	Barnet (2)	
13	West Ham United (3)	1–0	Brighton & Hove Albion (3)	
14	Cambridge United (4)	2–3	Leeds City Vixens (3)	
15	Southampton Saints (4)	0–1	Enfield Town (4)	
16	Mossley Hill (4)	3–2	Luton Town (4)	

== Fourth round proper ==
All matches were played on 27 February or 6 March 2011.

27 February 2011	Reading (2)	2–2 (a.e.t.) (4–5 p)	Charlton Athletic (3)	Tadley
	Howell; Wiggins	Report	Newman; Ali	Stadium: Barlows Park
	Penalties
	Penalty scored Penalty missed		Penalty scored

27 February 2011	Blackburn Rovers (2)	0–3	Millwall Lionesses (2)	Radcliffe
		Report	Longhurst; Beckett	Stadium: Stainton Park

27 February 2011	Leeds City Vixens (3)	0–1	Barnet (2)	Leeds
		Report	Sowden	Stadium: Bracken Edge

27 February 2011	Enfield Town	4–2	Mossey Hill (4)	Brimsdown
	Goal	Report	Goal	Stadium: Goldsdown Road

27 February 2011	Rochdale (3)	1–3	Sheffield Wednesday (4)	Chadderton
	Goal	Report	Goal	Stadium: Andrew Street

6 March 2011	Nottingham Forest (2)	3–3 (a.e.t.) (3–4 p)	Watford (2)	Gedling
	Lawson; Connor-Iommi	Report	Wiltshire	Stadium: Bill Stokeld Stadium
	Penalties
	Davies (penalty missed)		Penalty missed Penalty scored

6 March 2011	Derby County (3)	0–0 (a.e.t.) (2–4 p)	Sunderland (2)	Spondon
		Report		Stadium: Asterdale Bowl
	Penalties
	Penalty missed Penalty scored		Penalty scored

6 March 2011	West Ham United (3)	4–2	Colchester United (3)	Thurrock
	Downham; Thomas; Xidhas	Report	Heaslip; Bass	Stadium: Ship Lane

== Fifth round proper ==
All matches were played on 13 March 2011.

13 March 2011	Everton (1)	0–2	Arsenal (1)	Crosby
		Report	Yankey 57'; Chapman 74'	Stadium: Rossett Park; Attendance: 500

13 March 2011	Liverpool (1)	5–0	Charlton Athletic (3)	Skelmersdale
	Littlejohn; Brusell; Lappin	Report		Stadium: Community Ground

13 March 2011	Sunderland (2)	1–0	Lincoln (1)	Hetton-le-Hole
	Williams 71'	Report		Stadium: The Hetton Centre

13 March 2011	Birmingham City (1)	1–2	Barnet (2)	Tiddington
	Westwood 23'	Report	Smith 50'; Sowden 53'	Stadium: Knights Lane

13 March 2011	Chelsea (1)	0–1	Doncaster Rovers Belles (1)	Mitcham
		Report	Exley 21'	Stadium: Imperial Fields

13 March 2011	Sheffield Wednesday (4)	0–8	Bristol Academy (1)	Sheffield
		Report	Heatherson; Bleazard; Fishlock; Dykes; Clark	Stadium: Don Valley Stadium; Attendance: 58; Referee: Mr. J. Perselli (Manchester)

13 March 2011	Millwall Lionesses (2)	5–0	Watford (2)	Beckenham
	Beckett; Puddefoot; Longhurst	Report		Stadium: Eden Park Avenue; Attendance: 100

13 March 2011	Enfield Town (4)	0–1	West Ham United (3)	Enfield
		Report	Woodgates 88'	Stadium: Queen Elizabeth II Stadium; Attendance: 85

== Quarter–finals ==
Matches were played on 27 March 2011.

27 March 2011	Sunderland (2)	2–3 (a.e.t.)	Arsenal (1)	Hetton-le-Hole
14:00 BST	Furness 21'; Bannon 80'	Report	E. White 47', 92'; Fleeting 78'	Stadium: Hetton Centre

27 March 2011	Millwall Lionesses (2)	1–2	Bristol Academy (1)	Beckenham
	Morgan 3'	Report	Bleazard 32'; Fishlock 38'	Stadium: Eden Park Avenue

27 March 2011	Liverpool (1)	3–0	Doncaster Rovers Belles (1)	Skelmersdale
	Jones 1'; Foster 46'; Shepherd 90'	Report		Stadium: The Community Ground

27 March 2011	Barnet (2)	3–2 (a.e.t.)	West Ham United (3)	Perivale
	Sowden; Trimnell (pen.); Lance	Report	Sheppard; Woodgates	Stadium: Reynolds Field

== Semi–finals ==
Matches were played on 17 and 24th April 2011.

17 April 2011	Liverpool (1)	0–3	Bristol Academy (1)	Southport
14:00		Report	Fishlock 6'; Heatherson 16'; Bleazard 30' (pen.)	Stadium: Haig Avenue

24 April 2011	Barnet (2)	0–5	Arsenal (1)	Uxbridge
14:00		Report	White 3', 43', 54'; Little 6'; Yankey 46'	Stadium: Honeycroft

== Final ==
21 May 2011
15:00 BST

Arsenal	2–0	Bristol Academy
Little 19'; Fleeting 32'	Report

Ricoh Arena, Coventry
Attendance: 13,885
Referee: Sian Massey
