= Keith Nobbs (footballer) =

English footballer

Personal information
- Full name: Alan Keith Nobbs
- Date of birth: 18 September 1961 (age 65)
- Place of birth: Bishop Auckland, England
- Height: 5 ft 10 in (1.78 m)
- Position: Right-back

Youth career
- 1985–1986: Blackpool

Senior career*
Years	Team	Apps	(Gls)
1980–1982	Middlesbrough	1	(0)
1982–1984	Halifax Town	87	(1)
1984–1985	Bishop Auckland		
1985–1993	Hartlepool United	280	(1)
1993–1995	Gateshead	72	(1)
- * Club domestic league appearances and goals

Alan Keith Nobbs (born 19 September 1961) is an English former professional footballer.

== Playing career ==
Nobbs' 326 games in all competitions for Hartlepool United places him 15th in the all-time appearance list. He was named Supporters' Player of the Year in 1991–92.

== Post–playing career ==
After retiring Nobbs spent a short time working as a housing officer. In 1996, he began working for Hartlepool United's community programme.

His daughter is England women's football international Jordan Nobbs.
