= 2012–13 FA Women's Cup =

Tournament details
- Country: England; Wales
- Teams: 283

Final positions
- Champions: Arsenal
- Runners-up: Bristol Academy

The 2012–13 FA Women's Cup was the 43rd season of the FA Women's Cup, the main domestic knockout Cup competition in English women's football. It lacked a sponsor for the second consecutive season.

283 clubs were accepted into the competition. The first qualifying round commenced on 30 September 2012, with the first round proper played on 9 December 2012. Arsenal beat Bristol Academy 3–0 in the final on 26 May 2013 at the Keepmoat Stadium, Doncaster.

Birmingham City were the defending champions, having beaten Chelsea in last season's final.

== Teams ==
Round	Clubs remaining	Clubs involved	Winners from previous round	New entries this round	Leagues entering at this round
First round qualifying	283	186	none	186	
Second round qualifying	190	106	93	13	
Third round qualifying	137	100	53	47	Northern Combination Women's Football League; Midland Combination Women's Football League; South West Combination Women's Football League; South East Combination Women's Football League
First round proper	87	50	50	none	
Second round proper	62	44	25	19	FA Women's Premier League Northern Division; FA Women's Premier League Southern Division
Third round proper	40	32	22	10	FA Women's Premier League National Division
Fourth round proper	24	16	16	none	
Fifth round proper	16	16	8	8	FA WSL
Quarter–finals	8	8	8	none	
Semi–finals	4	4	4	none	
Final	2	2	2	none	

== Schedule ==
The schedule for the 2012–13 FA Cup, as announced by the Football Association, is as follows:

Round	Main date	Number of fixtures	Clubs	Prize money
First round qualifying	30 September 2012	93	283 → 190	£125
Second round qualifying	14 October 2012	53	190 → 137	£175
Third round qualifying	11 November 2012	50	137 → 87	£225
First round proper	9 December 2012	25	87 → 62	£250
Second round proper	6 January 2013	22	62 → 40	£300
Third round proper	3 February 2013	16	40 → 24	£400
Fourth round proper	24 February 2013	8	24 → 16	£500
Fifth round proper	17 March 2013	8	16 → 8	£600
Quarter–finals	31 March 2013	4	8 → 4	£1,000
Semi–finals	28 April 2013	2	4 → 2	£2,000
Final	26 May 2013	1	2 → 1	Runner–up £2,000; Winner £5,000

== First qualifying round ==
All of the teams entering the competition that are not members of either the FA WSL, FA Women's Premier League National Division, FA Women's Premier League Northern Division or FA Women's Premier League Southern Division had to compete in the qualifying rounds to win a place in the competition proper.

Tie	Home team (tier)	Score	Away team (tier)	Att.
1	Abbey Rangers	2–1 (a.e.t.)	Meridian	
2	Accrington Girls & Ladies	3–5	Tranmere Rovers	
3	AFC Sudbury	5–2	Colchester Town	
4	AFC Trinity	6–5	Great Shelford	
5	AFC Wimbledon	H–W	East Preston	
Walkover for AFC Wimbledon Ladies
6	Allscott	2–1	Lightwood	
7	Andover New Street	3–1	Christchurch	
8	Appleby Frodingham	0–12	Rothwell	
9	Arnold Town	2–6	Lutterworth Athletic	
10	Ashford	4–1	South Park	
11	Barking	4–2	Stevenage	
12	Barnsley	3–0	Kirklees	
13	Birmingham & West Midlands	7–1	AFC Telford United	
14	Bradford Park Avenue	5–1	Brighouse Town	
15	Bradwell Belles	0–8	FC Reedswood	
16	Bridgwater Town	3–4	Stoke Lane Athletic	
17	Chelmsford City	H–W	Fakenham Town	
Walkover for Chelmsford City.
18	Cheltenham Civil Service	0–6	Brislington	
19	Chester Le Street Town	6–1	York City	
20	Consett	1–12	Peterlee St Francis	
21	Cottage Farm Rangers	0–9	Coventry Sphinx	
22	Coventry Development	2–3	Walsall	
23	Crewe Alexandra	3–1	Irlam	
24	Crown Newlaithes	1–5	Jarrow	
25	Dartford YMCA	1–4	Westfield	
26	Downend Flyers	9–1	AEK–BOCO	
27	Eastbourne Town	8–1	Claygate Royals	
28	Falmouth Town	8–2	Cheltenham Town	
29	Fleet Town	0–5	Poole Town	
30	Forest Hall	0–10	Durham Wildcats	
31	Forest Of Dean	1–0	Heavitree Social	
32	Handsworth	0–3	Guiseley AFC Vixens	
33	Haywards Heath Town	3–4	London Corinthians	
34	Headington	0–3	Denham United	
35	Hemel Hempstead Town	6–3	Newbury	
36	Hethersett Athletic	4–2	Lowestoft Town	
37	Hockering	1–3	Wymondham Town	
38	Huntingdon Town	4–3	Brackley Sports	
39	Hutton	2–3	Haverhill Rovers	
40	Ilminster Town	6–0	Street	
41	Keighley Oaks	0–2	Steel City Wanderers	
42	KIKK United	3–1	Haringey Borough	
43	Larkhall Athletic	5–1	Bude Town	
44	Leighton United Vixens	2–1	Leverstock Green	
45	Lichfield Diamonds	0–2	Crusaders	

Tie	Home team (tier)	Score	Away team (tier)	Att.
46	Long Eaton United	1–2	Nettleham	
47	Long Lane	3–2	Bexhill United	
48	Lowick United	3–5	Norton & Stockton Ancients	
49	Lye Town	1–7	Kenilworth Town	
50	Maidenhead United	5–1	Banbury United	
51	Marlow	4–6	Bracknell Town	
52	Mauritius Sports Association	3–1	Sawbridgeworth Town	
53	Middleton Athletic	3–5	City of Manchester	
54	Milford & Witley	0–6	Eastbourne	
55	Morecambe	4–1	Blackpool Wren Rovers	
56	Netherton United	3–1	Stewarts & Lloyds Corby	
57	North Shields	5–2	Birtley Town	
58	Oadby & Wigston	2–1 (a.e.t.)	Dronfield Town	
59	Actonians	1–3	Launton	
60	Oxford City	5–0	Ascot United	
61	Padiham	2–3	Preston North End	
62	Parkwood Rangers	3–3 (5–4 p)	Anchorians	
63	Parley Sports	1–5	Shanklin	
64	Pegasus	2–1	Malvern Town	
65	Pen Mill	3–5	Bitton	
66	Peterborough Sports Parkway	10–0	Raunds Town	
67	Prince of Wales	2–3 (a.e.t.)	Knaphill	
68	Quedgeley Wanderers	2–7	Bristol Union	
69	Ramsgate	2–5	Crawley Wasps	
70	Reading	1–2	Colne Valley	
71	Redcar Town	3–3 (2–3 p)	Kendal Town	
72	Regents Park Rangers	2–2 (6–7 p)	Battersea Ironsides	
73	Roade	H–W	Outwell Swifts	
Walkover for Roade.
74	Rottingdean Village	3–1	New Forest	
75	Royston Town	0–1	St Albans City	
76	Ruddington Village	3–4	Rise Park	
77	Rusthall	1–4	Maidstone United	
78	Sandiacre Town	4–2	Retford United	
79	Shenstone	1–2	Ellistown	
80	St Nicholas	3–2	Launceston	
81	Standon & Puckeridge	4–1	Sandy	
82	Swindon Spitfires	2–1	Gosport Borough	
83	The New Saints	4–1	Bexhill United	
84	Tring Athletic	2–4 (a.e.t.)	City Belles	
85	Victoire	A–W	Maidstone Town	
Walkover for Maidstone Town.
86	Warrington Town	1–11	Blackpool	
87	West Billericay	5–0	Assandun Vikings	
88	West Bridgford	1–6	Mansfield Town	
89	Wetherby Athletic	1–4	Ossett Albion	
90	Weymouth	3–3 (2–3 p)	Aldershot Town	
91	Whickham Fellside	5–0	California	
92	Wootton Bassett Town	2–6	Southampton	
93	Workington Reds	0–5	Whitley Bay	

== Second qualifying round ==
Tie	Home team (tier)	Score	Away team (tier)	Att.
1	Abbeytown	3–1	North Shields	
2	AFC Sudbury	3–1	Wymondham Town	
3	AFC Trinity	6–2	Moulton	
4	AFC Wimbledon	6–0	Abbey Rangers	
5	Ashford	3–5	Battersea Ironsides	
6	Barking	6–1	St Albans City	
7	Birmingham & West Midlands	2–1	Allscott	
8	Brislington	4–2	Ilminster Town	
9	Chelmsford City	2–3	C&K Basildon	
10	City of Manchester	1–2	Blackpool	
11	Colne Valley	4–1	Bracknell Town	
12	Crewe Alexandra	1–0	Chester City	
13	Downend Flyers	4–2	Bitton	
14	Eastbourne	0–7	Westfield	
15	FC Reedswood	6–2	Crusaders	
16	Forest Of Dean	3–1	Stoke Lane Athletic	
17	Guiseley AFC Vixens	1–3	Barnsley	
18	Hethersett Athletic	0–2	Billericay Town	
19	Huntingdon Town	2–5	Roade	
20	Jarrow	2–1	Whitley Bay	
21	Kendal Town	1–5	Chester Le Street Town	
22	Kenilworth Town	1–4	The New Saints	
23	KIKK United	9–3	Leighton United Vixens	
24	Knaphill	1–4	Eastbourne Town	
25	Larkhall Athletic	5–1	Falmouth Town	
26	Launton	0–4	Denham United	
27	London Corinthians	14–0	Maidstone United	
28	Maidenhead United	4–1	Hemel Hempstead Town	

Tie	Home team (tier)	Score	Away team (tier)	Att.
29	Maidstone Town	9–1	Rottingdean Village	
30	Mansfield Town	4–1	Oadby & Wigston	
31	Mauritius Sports Association	3–1	Standon & Puckeridge	
32	Morecambe	7–0	Birkenhead	
33	Norton & Stockton Ancients	2–8	Durham Wildcats	
34	Ossett Albion	2–6	Hull City	
35	Oxford City	3–0	City Belles	
36	Panthers	4–2	Long Lane	
37	Parkwood Rangers	2–1	Crawley Wasps	
38	Pegasus	3–4	Ellistown	
39	Peterborough Northern Star	7–3	Hampton	
40	Peterborough Sports Parkway	10–1	Netherton United	
41	Peterlee St Francis	7–1	Whickham Fellside	
42	Prudhoe Town	2–5	Penrith AFC	
43	Rise Park	2–1	Nettleham	
44	Rothwell	4–2	Westella & Willerby	
45	Sandiacre Town	3–4	Lutterworth Athletic	
46	Shanklin	2–0	Andover New Street	
47	Southampton	0–3	Aldershot Town	
48	St Nicholas	1–3	Bristol Union	
49	Steel City Wanderers	6–2	Bradford Park Avenue	
50	Swindon Spitfires	3–4 (a.e.t.)	Poole Town	
51	Tranmere Rovers	3–0	Preston North End	
52	Walsall	2–3	Coventry Sphinx	
53	West Billericay	4–0	Haverhill Rovers	

== Third qualifying round ==
Tie	Home team (tier)	Score	Away team (tier)	Att.
1	Abbeytown	0–4	Leeds City Vixens	
2	AFC Sudbury	5–1	West Billericay	
3	AFC Wimbledon	1–0	Aldershot Town	
4	Arlesey Town	2–0	Peterborough Northern Star	
5	Barking	0–4	Enfield Town	
6	Barnsley	1–2	Liverpool Feds	
7	Billericay Town	2–4	Brentwood Town	
8	Bradford City	4–0	Rothwell	
9	Cambridge United	3–1	KIKK United	
10	Cheadle Heath Nomads	0–4	Huddersfield Town	
11	Chesham United	15–0	Roade	
12	Chester Le Street Town	1–7	Stockport County	
13	Chichester City	1–0	Denham United	
14	Chorley	4–1	Rotherham United	
15	Crewe Alexandra	3–1	Tranmere Rovers	
16	Crystal Palace	1–4	Parkwood Rangers	
17	Durham Wildcats	10–0	Wakefield	
18	Eastbourne Town	0–1	Southampton Saints	
19	Ellistown	0–4	Stoke City	
20	Forest Green Rovers	7–3	Downend Flyers	
21	Forest Of Dean	3–9	Exeter City	
22	Gloucester City	0–5	Keynsham Town	
23	Larkhall Athletic	2–0	Bristol Union	
24	Leafield Athletic	5–4	Birmingham & West Midlands	
25	Leamington Lions	0–3	Milton Keynes Dons	
26	Leicester City Ladies	4–3	FC Reedswood	

Tie	Home team (tier)	Score	Away team (tier)	Att.
27	London Corinthians	7–1	Panthers	
28	Loughborough Foxes	5–0	Daventry Town	
29	Loughborough Students	0–3	Copsewood Coventry	
30	Lutterworth Athletic	4–1	Mansfield Town	
31	Maidenhead United	2–3	Colne Valley	
32	Maidstone Town	1–3	University Of Portsmouth	
33	Mauritius Sports Association (MSA)	2–1 (a.e.t.)	AFC Trinity	
34	Middlesbrough	6–4	Curzon Ashton	
35	Mossley Hill	2–1	South Durham & Cestria	
36	Norwich City	2–4	Luton Town	
37	Oxford City	0–7	Ipswich Town	
38	Oxford United	5–0	Battersea Ironsides	
39	Penrith AFC	2–6	Morecambe	
40	Peterborough Sports Parkway	3–4 (a.e.t.)	C&K Basildon	
41	Peterlee St Francis	H–W	Hull City	
Walkover for Peterlee St Francis.
42	Plymouth Argyle	4–2	Keynsham Town Development	
43	Poole Town	1–9	Swindon Town	
44	Radcliffe Olympic	2–0	The New Saints	
45	Rise Park	2–1	Coventry Sphinx	
46	Shanklin	1–3	Brislington	
47	Sheffield United Community	1–0	Jarrow	
48	Steel City Wanderers	0–2	Blackpool	
49	Westfield	3–2	Ebbsfleet United	

== First round proper ==
The draw was made on 12 November 2012 with ties were scheduled to be played on 9 December 2012. Colne Valley were the lowest–ranked team left in the competition, competing in the Greater London Division 1 at level 8 of the English Women's football league system.

Number of teams per tier still in competition
WSL 1	PLND	PLN/SD	Combination	Regional & County	Total
8 / 8	10 / 10	19 / 19	33 / 33	17 / 17	87 / 87

9 December 2012	AFC Sudbury (6)	0–5	London Corinthians (5)	Sudbury
		Report	Goal	Stadium: The Elite Travel Stadium

9 December 2012	Arlesey Town (4)	1–3	C&K Basildon (5)	Arlesey
	Goal	Report	Brown-Wealls; Carty	Stadium: New Lamb Meadow

9 December 2012	Bradford City (4)	3–1	Stockport County (4)	Bradford
	Goal	Report	Goal	Stadium: Dennyfield

9 December 2012	Cambridge United (4)	4–0	Brentwood Town (4)	Ely
	Goal	Report		Stadium: The Unwin Ground

9 December 2012	Chichester City (4)	1–4	Swindon Town (4)	Chichester
	Goal	Report	Goal	Stadium: Oaklands Park

9 December 2012	Chorley (4)	2–4	Morecambe (5)	Charnock Richard
	Goal	Report	Goal	Stadium: Mossie Park

9 December 2012	Durham Wildcats (6)	4–0	Blackpool (5)	Durham
	Goal	Report		Stadium: Maiden Castle Sports Centre

9 December 2012	Enfield Town (4)	1–3	Chesham United (4)	Enfield
	Goal	Report	Goal	Stadium: Queen Elizabeth II Stadium; Referee: John Noblemunn

9 December 2012	Exeter City (4)	7–0	Brislington (7)	Exeter
	Goal	Report		Stadium: St James Park; Referee: Maaren Olander

9 December 2012	Forest Green Rovers (4)	2–3 (a.e.t.)	Plymouth Argyle (4)	Cambridge
	Goal	Report	Goal	Stadium: Thornhill Park

9 December 2012	Ipswich Town (4)	5–1	AFC Wimbledon (5)	Ipswich
	Goal	Report	Goal	Stadium: Humber Doucy Lane

9 December 2012	Keynsham Town (4)	8–0	University Of Portsmouth (4)	Keynsham
	Goal	Report		Stadium: Crown Field

9 December 2012	Liverpool Feds (4)	1–0	Crewe Alexandra (5)	Allerton
	Goal	Report		Stadium: Heron Eccles Playing Fields

9 December 2012	Loughborough Foxes (4)	1–0	Leicester City Ladies (4)	Loughborough
	Goal	Report		Stadium: Loughborough University Stadium

9 December 2012	Middlesbrough (4)	5–2	Peterlee St Francis (5)	Middlehaven
	Goal	Report	Goal	Stadium: Middlesbrough College

9 December 2012	Milton Keynes Dons (4)	2–1	Luton Town (4)	Denbigh
	Goal	Report	Goal	Stadium: Stadium MK

9 December 2012	Oxford United (4)	2–1	Newquay (4)	Cowley
	Goal	Report	Goal	Stadium: Oxford United Training Ground

9 December 2012	Parkwood Rangers (6)	1–4	Colne Valley (8)	Bexley
	Goal	Report	Goal	Stadium: Bexley Park Sports & Social Club

9 December 2012	Radcliffe Olympic (4)	6–1	Lutterworth Athletic (6)	Radcliffe-on-Trent
	Goal	Report	Goal	Stadium: South Nottinghamshire Academy

9 December 2012	Rise Park (5)	1–3	Copsewood Coventry (4)	Arnold
	Goal	Report	Goal	Stadium: Eagle Valley

9 December 2012	Sheffield United Community (4)	2–1	Mossley Hill (4)	Retford
	Goal	Report	Goal	Stadium: Cannon Park

9 December 2012	Southampton Saints (4)	0–2 (a.e.t.)	Larkhall Athletic (5)	Southampton
		Report	Goal	Stadium: Test Park Sports Ground

9 December 2012	Stoke City (4)	2–3	Leafield Athletic (4)	Stone
	Goal	Report	Goal	Stadium: Wellbeing Park

9 December 2012	Westfield (5)	2–1	Mauritius Sports Association (6)	Westfield
	Goal	Report	Goal	Stadium: Woking Park

16 December 2012	Leeds City Vixens (4)	3–3 (a.e.t.) (4–5 p)	Huddersfield Town (4)
	Goal	Report	Goal
	Penalties
	Penalty scored Penalty missed		Penalty scored

== Second round proper ==
The draw was made on 10 December 2012 with ties were scheduled to be played on 6 January 2013. Colne Valley were the lowest–ranked team left in the competition, competing in the Greater London Division 1 at level 8 of the English Women's football league system.

Number of teams per tier still in competition
WSL 1	PLND	PLN/SD	Combination	Regional & County	Total
8 / 8	10 / 10	19 / 19	18 / 33	7 / 17	62 / 87

6 January 2013	Chesham United (4)	1–2 (a.e.t.)	Queens Park Rangers (3)	Chesham
	Goal	Report	Goal	Stadium: The Meadow

6 January 2013	Colchester United (3)	1–5	Sporting Club Albion (3)	Stanway
	Goal	Report	James 30', 54'; Pope 48'; Neville 59'; Baptiste 78'	Stadium: Hawthorns

6 January 2013	Colne Valley (8)	0–8	Yeovil Town (3)	Laleham
		Report	Bray; Brazell; Cook; Keehan; Lorton	Stadium: Laleham Recreation Ground; Referee: Mark Sellars

6 January 2013	Exeter City (4)	2–3	Swindon Town (4)	Newton Abbot
	Goal	Report	Goal	Stadium: Coach Road; Referee: Barry Jackson

6 January 2013	Gillingham (3)	6–1	Milton Keynes Dons (4)	Chatham
	Goal	Report	Goal	Stadium: The Bauvill Stadium

6 January 2013	Ipswich Town (4)	1–0	Cambridge United (4)	Rushmere
	Goal	Report		Stadium: Humber Doucy Lane

6 January 2013	Larkhall Athletic (5)	0–2	Plymouth Argyle (4)	Bath
		Report	Goal	Stadium: Plain Ham

6 January 2013	Leafield Athletic (4)	6–0	C&K Basildon (5)	Edgbaston
	Goal	Report		Stadium: Tally Ho

6 January 2013	Leicester City (3)	0–2	Preston North End (3)	Leicester
		Report	Goal	Stadium: Riverside

6 January 2013	Lewes (3)	1–2	Reading (3)	Lewes
	Trafford 43'	Report	Williams 67'; Kirby 72'	Stadium: The Dripping Pan

6 January 2013	London Corinthians (5)	0–3	West Ham United (3)	Thamesmead
		Report	Goal	Stadium: Bayliss Avenue

6 January 2013	Loughborough Foxes (4)	0–2	Derby County (3)	Loughborough
		Report	Goal	Stadium: Loughborough University Stadium

6 January 2013	Middlesbrough (4)	4–1	Huddersfield Town (4)	Thornaby-on-Tees
	Goal	Report	Goal	Stadium: Teesdale Park

6 January 2013	Millwall Lionesses (3)	3–1	Wolverhampton Wanderers (3)	Beckenham
	Whitter 20', 90'; Chong 88'	Report	Price 90+1'	Stadium: Eden Park Avenue

6 January 2013	Morecambe (5)	6–3	Liverpool Feds (4)	Lancaster
	Goal	Report	Goal	Stadium: Lancaster and Morecambe College

6 January 2013	Newcastle United (3)	2–0	Radcliffe Olympic (4)	Newcastle upon Tyne
	Gardener 31'; Wilson 88'	Report		Stadium: Longbenton Sports Ground

6 January 2013	Oxford United (4)	6–1	Keynsham Town (4)	Cowley
	Goal	Report	Goal	Stadium: Oxford United Training Ground

6 January 2013	Sheffield (3)	2–1	Blackburn Rovers (3)	Dronfield
	Goal	Report	Goal	Stadium: Home of Football Ground

6 January 2013	Sheffield United Community (4)	4–2	Durham Wildcats (6)	Retford
	Goal	Report	Goal	Stadium: Cannon Park

6 January 2013	Tottenham Hotspur (3)	2–0	Copsewood Coventry (4)	Harlow
	D. Smith 57'; Martin 60'	Report		Stadium: Barrow's Farm Stadium

6 January 2013	Westfield (5)	2–9	Brighton & Hove Albion (3)	Westfield
	Goal	Report	Stenning 7', 55'; Agg 17', 28', 37', 56'; Gurr 47'; Rabson 67', 85'	Stadium: Woking Park

3 February 2013	Nottingham Forest (3)	6–3	Bradford City (4)	Gedling
	Whelan 33', 61'; Thomas 47'; Howard 50', 57'; S. Smith 75'	Report	Goal	Stadium: Bill Stokeld Stadium

== Third round proper ==
The draw was made on 7 January 2013 with ties were scheduled to be played on 3 February 2013. Morecambe were the lowest–ranked team left in the competition, competing in the North West Women's Regional League Premier Division at level 5 of the English Women's football league system.

Number of teams per tier still in competition
WSL 1	PLND	PLN/SD	Combination	Regional & County	Total
8 / 8	10 / 10	14 / 19	7 / 33	1 / 17	40 / 87

3 February 2013	Barnet (2)	0–3	Yeovil Town (3)	Chipping Barnet
		Report	Pearson	Stadium: Underhill Stadium

3 February 2013	Charlton Athletic (2)	1–2	Oxford United (4)	Thamesmead
	Newman 9'	Report	Goal	Stadium: Bayliss Avenue; Attendance: 157

3 February 2013	Coventry City (2)	2–1	Morecambe (5)	Bedworth
	Goal	Report	Goal	Stadium: The Oval

3 February 2013	Derby County (3)	0–4	Watford (2)	Spondon
		Report	Wynne 4'; Wilson 37', 72'; Rowell 82'	Stadium: Asterdale Bowl

3 February 2013	Ipswich Town (4)	0–2	Aston Villa (2)	Rushmere
		Report	Ferguson 25'; Davies 75'	Stadium: Humber Doucy Lane

3 February 2013	Leafield Athletic (4)	2–3	Sporting Club Albion (3)	Edgbaston
	Goal	Report	James 13', 88'; Rippington 59'	Stadium: Tally-Ho Grounds

3 February 2013	Leeds United (2)	3–2	West Ham United (3)	Farsley
	Huegett 10'; Sheen 43'; Sharp 44'	Report	Gowland 77'	Stadium: Throstle Nest

3 February 2013	Manchester City (2)	3–2	Sheffield (3)	Manchester
	Johnston 2'; Savage 9'; Danby 70'	Report	Goal	Stadium: Manchester Regional Arena; Attendance: 116; Referee: John Walton

3 February 2013	Middlesbrough (4)	1–6	Sunderland (2)	Thornaby-on-Tees
	Goal	Report	Mead 27'; Ramshaw 35', 64', 79'; Gutteridge 72'; Salicki 85'	Stadium: Teesdale Park

3 February 2013	Newcastle United (3)	2–1	Plymouth Argyle (4)	Newcastle upon Tyne
	Goal	Report	Goal	Stadium: Longbenton Sports Ground

3 February 2013	Portsmouth (2)	5–0	Queens Park Rangers (3)	Havant
	Wilson 9', 21', 40', 54'; McGee 62'	Report		Stadium: Westleigh Park

3 February 2013	Preston North End (3)	3–2	Millwall Lionesses (3)	Bamber Bridge
	Ball 15', 79'; Carroll 42'	Report	Lennon 30'; Griffiths 50'	Stadium: Irongate

3 February 2013	Reading (3)	4–2	Brighton & Hove Albion (3)	Tadley
	Chard 47'; Lloyd 48'; Palmer 75', 81'	Report	Agg 25'; O'Hagan 83'	Stadium: Barlows Park

3 February 2013	Swindon Town (4)	0–1 (a.e.t.)	Gillingham (3)	Fairford
		Report	Goal	Stadium: Cinder Lane

3 February 2013	Tottenham Hotspur (3)	0–4	Cardiff City (2)	Harlow
		Report	Goal	Stadium: The Harlow Arena

17 February 2013	Sheffield United Community (4)	1–5	Nottingham Forest (3)	Retford
	Goal	Report	Whelan 36', 44', 58'; Smith 52'; Bell 75'	Stadium: Cannon Park

== Fourth round proper ==
The draw was made on 4 February 2013 with ties were scheduled to be played on 24 February 2013. Oxford United were the lowest–ranked team left in the competition, competing in the South West Combination at level 4 of the English Women's football league system.

Number of teams per tier still in competition
WSL 1	PLND	PLN/SD	Combination	Regional & County	Total
8 / 8	9 / 10	6 / 19	1 / 33	0 / 17	24 / 87

24 February 2013	Aston Villa (2)	3–0	Preston North End (3)	Boldmere
	Gibson 6'; Jones 12'; Petrovic 24'	Report		Stadium: Boldmere Community Stadium

24 February 2013	Cardiff City (2)	2–1 (a.e.t.)	Reading (3)	Canton
	Goal	Report	C. Williams 81'	Stadium: Cardiff International Sports Campus

24 February 2013	Coventry City (2)	0–1	Manchester City (2)	Bedworth
		Report	Buffel	Stadium: The Oval; Referee: Sian Piret

24 February 2013	Gillingham (3)	2–3	Nottingham Forest (3)	Chatham
	Goal	Report	Meade 30'; Thomas 42'; McLoughlin 79'	Stadium: The Bauvill Stadium; Attendance: 78

24 February 2013	Oxford United (4)	2–1	Newcastle United (2)	Oxford
	Goal	Report	Ashenhurst 59'	Stadium: Kassam Stadium; Attendance: 730

24 February 2013	Sporting Club Albion (3)	1–2	Sunderland (2)	Halesowen
	James 90+2'	Report	Mead 4'; S. Williams 20'	Stadium: Grove Recreation Ground; Attendance: 119

24 February 2013	Watford (2)	0–2	Leeds United (2)	Berkhamsted
		Report	Rich 4'; Lee 62'	Stadium: Broadwater

24 February 2013	Yeovil Town (3)	3–0	Portsmouth (2)	Sherborne
	Bray; Pearson; Radburn	Report		Stadium: Raleigh Grove

== Fifth round proper ==
The draw was made on 25 February 2013 with ties were scheduled to be played on 17 March 2013. Oxford United were the lowest–ranked team left in the competition, competing in the South West Combination at level 4 of the English Women's football league system.

Number of teams per tier still in competition
WSL 1	PLND	PLN/SD	Combination	Regional & County	Total
8 / 8	5 / 10	2 / 19	1 / 33	0 / 17	16 / 87

17 March 2013	Cardiff City (2)	1–3	Birmingham City (1)	Cardiff
	Stewart 36'	Report	Williams 18', 54', 81'	Stadium: Cardiff International Sports Stadium

17 March 2013	Lincoln (1)	1–0	Chelsea (1)	Lincoln
	Clarke 57'	Report		Stadium: Sincil Bank; Attendance: 374; Referee: Dean Appleby

17 March 2013	Aston Villa (2)	0–5	Liverpool (1)	Boldmere
		Report	Williams 8', 57', 77'; Fors 34' (pen.); Dowie 74'	Stadium: Boldmere Community Stadium; Attendance: 150; Referee: Kevin Allsop

17 March 2013	Doncaster Rovers Belles (1)	0–2	Bristol Academy (1)	Doncaster
		Report	Yorston 35'; Heatherson 55'	Stadium: Keepmoat Stadium

17 March 2013	Sunderland (2)	4–0	Manchester City (2)	Hetton-le-Hole
	Mead 33', 53'; Williams 41'; Bannon 56'	Report		Stadium: The Hetton Centre; Referee: Peter Osgood

17 March 2013	Leeds United (2)	4–0	Yeovil Town (3)	Farsley
	Huegett 6', 68' (pen.); Lipman 16'; Sharp 76'	Report		Stadium: Throstle Nest; Attendance: 125; Referee: N Giles

30 March 2013	Oxford United (4)	0–7	Everton (1)	Littlemore
		Report	Chaplen 9'; Duggan 14', 43', 70'; Hinnigan 17', 63'; Parris 80'	Stadium: Kassam Stadium; Attendance: 945; Referee: Ian Rathbone

31 March 2013	Nottingham Forest (3)	0–7	Arsenal (1)	Gedling
		Report	Carter 20', 89'; Beattie 25'; Ludlow 30'; White 35'; Nobbs 40'; Houghton 45'	Stadium: Bill Stokeld Stadium

== Quarter–finals ==
The draw for the quarter–finals took place on 18 March 2013, with Leeds United and Sunderland from the Women's Premier League National Division (2) remaining as the lowest–ranked teams.

Number of teams per tier still in competition
WSL 1	PLND	PLN/SD	Combination	Regional & County	Total
6 / 8	2 / 10	0 / 19	0 / 33	0 / 17	8 / 87

31 March 2013	Lincoln (1)	4–0	Leeds United (2)	Lincoln
12:00	Hamilton 15', 42'; Allen 79' (pen.); Cantrell 83'	Report		Stadium: Sincil Bank; Attendance: 414

31 March 2013	Sunderland (2)	1–2	Liverpool (1)	South Tyneside
14:00	Mead 50'	Report	Billson 13'; Ómarsdóttir 85'	Stadium: Academy of Light

9 April 2013	Arsenal (1)	6–0	Birmingham City (1)	Borehamwood
19:30	Davison 11', 65'; Nobbs 33'; White 43', 51'; Little 55'	Report		Stadium: Meadow Park; Attendance: 520

14 April 2013	Bristol Academy (1)	3–2	Everton (1)	Filton
14:00	Natalia 1', 51'; Del Río 61'	Report	Duggan 32', 66'	Stadium: Stoke Gifford Stadium

== Semi–finals ==
The draw for the semi–finals took place on 1 April 2013, with the ties scheduled to take place on 26 and 28 April 2013.

Number of teams per tier still in competition
WSL 1	PLND	PLN/SD	Combination	Regional & County	Total
4 / 8	0 / 10	0 / 19	0 / 33	0 / 17	4 / 87

26 April 2013	Liverpool (1)	1–2	Arsenal (1)	Liverpool
19:00	Dowie 45'	Report	White 24'; Little 52'	Stadium: Anfield; Attendance: 2,008

28 April 2013	Bristol Academy (1)	2–0	Lincoln (1)	Bristol
14:00	Natalia 59'; Del Río 82'	Report		Stadium: Ashton Gate Stadium; Attendance: 900

== Final ==
26 May 2013
15:00

Arsenal	3–0	Bristol Academy
Houghton 2'; Nobbs 72'; White 90+4'	Report

Keepmoat Stadium, Doncaster
Attendance: 4,998
