= South West Combination Women's Football League =

- Founded: 1998
- Folded: 2014
- Country: England
- Divisions: 1
- Number of clubs: 11
- Level on pyramid: 4
- Feeder to: FA Women's Premier League Southern Division
- Relegation to: Southern Region Women's Football League; South West Regional Women's Football League
- Last champions: Plymouth Argyle (2013–14)
- Website: Official website

The South West Combination Women's Football League, also known simply as the South West Combination, was a women's football league in England from 1998 to 2014. Until the creation of the FA Women's Super League in 2011, they sat at the third level of English women's football pyramid along with the three other Combination Leagues – South East, Midland and Northern. The South West Combination fed into the FA Women's Premier League Southern Division, and lied above the Southern Region Women's Football League and the South West Regional Women's Football League in the pyramid. For the 2014–15 season the South West Combination was incorporated into the newly re-structured FA Women's Premier League as the FA WPL South West Division One.

== Clubs for 2013–14 season ==
Club	Finishing position 2012–13	Finishing position 2013–14
Chichester City		3rd
Exeter City	6th	2nd
Forest Green Rovers	4th	4th
Keynsham Development	10th	9th
Larkhall Athletic		6th
Newquay	8th	10th
Plymouth Argyle	3rd	1st
Shanklin	1st in Southern	8th
Southampton Saints	7th	7th
Swindon Town	5th	5th
University of Portsmouth Community	9th	11th

== Previous champions ==
Season	Winner
1998–99	Cardiff County
1999–00	Newport Strikers
2000–01	Bristol Rovers
2001–02	Bristol City
2002–03	Portsmouth
2003–04	Cardiff City
2004–05	Reading Royals
2005–06	Keynsham Town
2006–07	Newquay
2007–08	Reading
2008–09	Queens Park Rangers
2009–10	Yeovil Town
2010–11	Plymouth Argyle
2011–12	Yeovil Town
2012–13	Oxford United
2013–14	Plymouth Argyle
