= 2013–14 FA Women's Cup =

Tournament details
- Country: England; Wales

Final positions
- Champions: Arsenal
- Runners-up: Everton

The 2013–14 FA Women's Cup is the 44th season of the FA Women's Cup, the main domestic knockout Cup competition in English women's football. Arsenal are the defending champions and the final will be played at Stadium mk.

== Preliminary round ==
| Tie | Home team (tier) | Score | Away team (tier) | Att. |
|---|---|---|---|---|
| 1 | Fleet Town | 4–2 | Christchurch | |
| 2 | Folly Lane | 3–2 | Brereton Town | |
| 3 | Moulton | 4–3 | Roade | |
| 4 | Wootton Bassett Town | 1–0 | Cheltenham Civil Service | |

== First qualifying round ==
| Tie | Home team (tier) | Score | Away team (tier) | Att. |
|---|---|---|---|---|
| 1 | AFC Dunstable | 4–0 | Ascot United | |
| 2 | AFC Wimbledon | 5–1 | Worthing Town | |
| 3 | Aldershot Town | 0–3 | Parley Sports | |
| 4 | Allscott | 0–4 | The New Saints | |
| 5 | Andover New Street | 0–1 | Basingstoke Town | |
| 6 | Asfordby Amateurs | 1–5 | Arnold Town | |
| 7 | Assandun Vikings | 0–2 | Waveney Wanderers | |
| 8 | Aylesford | 5–0 | Regents Park Rangers | |
| 9 | Bar Hill | 2–1 (a.e.t.) | Moulton | |
| 10 | Barking | 6–0 | Flitwick | |
| 11 | Battersea & Wandsworth | 8–1 | Abbey Rangers | |
| 12 | Bexhill United | H–W | Sheppey & Sheerness United | |
Walkover for Bexhill United
| 13 | Bilbrook | 4–2 | Lye Town | |
| 14 | Birkenhead | 3–4 | Crewe Alexandra | |
| 15 | Birtley Town | 1–2 (a.e.t.) | Abbeytown | |
| 16 | Blackpool | 0–3 | Burnley | |
| 17 | Boldon | 5–1 | Lowick United | |
| 18 | Bridgwater Town | 1–5 | St Nicholas | |
| 19 | Brighouse Town | 4–1 | CMB | |
| 20 | Brislington | 2–1 | Stoke Lane Athletic | |
| 21 | Bristol Union | 11–0 | Wootton Bassett Town | |
| 22 | Bungay Town | 2–3 | West Billericay | |
| 23 | Bury Girls & Ladies | 1–2 (a.e.t.) | Woolton | |
| 24 | Cheltenham Town | 9–0 | Pen Mill | |
| 25 | Chertsey Town | 0–3 | AFC Wimbledon Development | |
| 26 | Chester City | H–W | Preston North End Ladies | |
Walkover for Chester City
| 27 | Cirencester Town | 2–1 | Bitton | |
| 28 | City of Manchester | 5–5 (2–1 p) | Accrington Girls & Ladies | |
| 29 | Colchester Town | 5–0 | Haverhill Rovers | |
| 30 | Colne Valley | 1–4 (a.e.t.) | Actonians | |
| 31 | Cottage Farm Rangers | 1–7 | Kenilworth Town | |
| 32 | Coventrians | 2–2 (?–? p) | Malvern Town | |
| 33 | Crawley Wasps | 9–0 | Milford & Witley | |
| 34 | Crusaders | 1–2 | FC Reedswood | |
| 35 | Crystal Palace | 7–4 | Parkwood Rangers | |
| 36 | Dartford YMCA | 2–6 | Hemel Hempstead Town | |
| 37 | Downend Flyers | 3–1 | Forest Of Dean | |
| 38 | Downend Flyers | 2–4 | Ruddington Village | |
| 39 | Eastbourne | 0–6 | Eastbourne Town | |
| 40 | Farsley Celtic | 0–4 | Steel City Wanderers | |
| 41 | FC Clacton | 0–15 | Billericay Town | |
| 42 | Frome Town | 5–5 (0–3 p) | Ilminster Town | |
| 43 | Fulham | 3–0 | South Park | |
| 44 | Gloucester City | 10–2 | Longlevens | |
| 45 | Gosport Borough | 6–0 | Weymouth | |
| 46 | Handsworth | 1–0 | Lepton Highlanders | |

| Tie | Home team (tier) | Score | Away team (tier) | Att. |
|---|---|---|---|---|
| 47 | Headington | 0–3 | Bracknell Town | |
| 48 | Hemel Hempstead Town | 7–0 | Banbury United | |
| 49 | Hemsworth MW | 3–5 | Malet Lambert | |
| 50 | Herne Bay | 3–1 | Anchorians | |
| 51 | Hull City | 4–1 | Brighouse Athletic | |
| 52 | Kendal Town | 3–5 | Birtley St Joseph | |
| 53 | Kettering Town | 2–6 | Bedford | |
| 54 | KIKK United | 7–0 | Haringey Borough | |
| 55 | Leighton United Vixens | 5–1 | Wealdstone | |
| 56 | London Corinthians | 2–0 | Maidstone United | |
| 57 | Lowestoft Town | 6–1 | AFC Sudbury | |
| 58 | Maidenhead United | 6–2 | Newbury | |
| 59 | Middleton Athletic | 2–3 | Blackpool Wren Rovers | |
| 60 | Morecambe | 10–1 | Padiham | |
| 61 | Netherton United | 0–15 | Peterborough Northern Star | |
| 62 | Ossett Albion | 3–2 | Bradford Park Avenue | |
| 63 | Oxford City | 2–0 | Marlow | |
| 64 | Pegasus | 4–0 | Folly Lane | |
| 65 | Peterborough Sports Parkway | 9–0 | Brackley Sports | |
| 66 | Peterlee St Francis | 3–2 (a.e.t.) | York City | |
| 67 | Poole Town | 6–1 | Fleet Town | |
| 68 | Prince of Wales | H–W | Tunbridge Wells Ridgewaye | |
Walkover for Prince of Wales
| 69 | Prudhoe Town | 0–2 | Kader | |
| 70 | Quedgeley Wanderers | 0–18 | Swindon Spitfires | |
| 71 | Rise Park | 2–3 | Ellistown | |
| 72 | Rothwell Corinthians | 1–4 | Raunds Town | |
| 73 | Royston Town | 2–1 | Wootton Blue Cross | |
| 74 | Rusthall | 4–1 | Rottingdean Village | |
| 75 | Rutherford | 5–0 | Forest Hall | |
| 76 | Sandiacre Town | 7–1 | West Bridgford | |
| 77 | Sawbridgeworth Town | 1–2 | St Albans City | |
| 78 | Sheffield Wednesday | 1–6 | Nettleham | |
| 79 | Southampton | 2–2 (5–3 p) | New Forest | |
| 80 | Southendian | 5–0 | Brandon Town | |
| 81 | St George's | 1–3 | Long Eaton United | |
| 82 | Stevenage | 5–2 | Hoddesdon Owls | |
| 83 | Teversal | 0–4 | Oadby & Wigston | |
| 84 | Torquay United | 4–0 | Bude Town | |
| 85 | Tower Hill | 0–7 | Leverstock Green | |
| 86 | Truro City | 4–0 | Launceston | |
| 87 | Walsall | 7–6 (a.e.t.) | Pelsall Villa | |
| 88 | Westfield | 11–0 | Knaphill | |
| 89 | Whickham Fellside | 2–2 (0–3 p) | Penrith AFC | |
| 90 | Whitley Bay | 2–1 | Middlesbrough Lionesses | |
| 91 | Willington | 0–5 | Hartlepool United | |
| 92 | Workington Reds | 0–5 | RACA Tynedale | |

== Second qualifying round ==
| Tie | Home team (tier) | Score | Away team (tier) | Att. |
|---|---|---|---|---|
| 1 | Abbeytown | 1–8 | Peterlee St Francis | |
| 2 | AFC Dunstable | 3–1 | Royston Town | |
| 3 | AFC Wimbledon | 1–1 (2–3 p) | Oxford City | |
| 4 | Arnold Town | 4–3 (a.e.t.) | Kenilworth Town | |
| 5 | Bar Hill | 0–4 | Billericay Town | |
| 6 | Barking | 3–1 | West Billericay | |
| 7 | Bedford | 5–2 | Stevenage | |
| 8 | Birtley St Joseph | 0–2 | Whitley Bay | |
| 9 | Blackpool Wren Rovers | 1–1 (5–4 p) | Chester City | |
| 10 | Boldon | 4–1 | Rutherford | |
| 11 | Bracknell Town | 3–1 | Crawley Wasps | |
| 12 | Brighouse Town | 4–1 | Woolton | |
| 13 | Burnley | 4–5 (a.e.t.) | City of Manchester | |
| 14 | Cheltenham Town | 2–1 | Ilminster Town | |
| 15 | Cirencester Town | 2–4 | Parley Sports | |
| 16 | Colchester Town | 1–3 | Leighton United Vixens | |
| 17 | Crystal Palace | 2–1 (a.e.t.) | Actonians | |
| 18 | Downend Flyers | 0–1 | Basingstoke Town | |
| 19 | FC Reedswood | 4–3 | Ellistown | |
| 20 | Fulham | 3–1 | Bexhill United | |
| 21 | Gloucester City | 4–1 | Brislington | |
| 22 | Gosport Borough | 2–0 | Bristol Union | |
| 23 | Haywards Heath Town | 2–3 | Rusthall | |
| 24 | Hemel Hempstead Town | 1–8 | Leverstock Green | |

| Tie | Home team (tier) | Score | Away team (tier) | Att. |
|---|---|---|---|---|
| 25 | Hull City | 3–0 | Handsworth | |
| 26 | KIKK United | 9–0 | Battersea & Wandsworth | |
| 27 | London Corinthians | 5–1 | Herne Bay | |
| 28 | Lowestoft Town | 4–0 | Peterborough Sports Parkway | |
| 29 | Maidenhead United | 5–1 | Eastbourne Town | |
| 30 | Malvern Town | 0–4 | Raunds Town | |
| 31 | Morecambe | 5–3 (a.e.t.) | Steel City Wanderers | |
| 32 | Nettleham | 6–0 | Crewe Alexandra | |
| 33 | Oadby & Wigston | 4–5 | Long Eaton United | |
| 34 | Ossett Albion | 0–3 | Malet Lambert | |
| 35 | Penrith | 2–2 (3–4 p) | Kader | |
| 36 | Prince of Wales | 1–2 | AFC Wimbledon Development | |
| 37 | RACA Tynedale | 4–1 | Hartlepool United | |
| 38 | Ruddington Village | 1–8 | Sandiacre Town | |
| 39 | Southendian | 1–3 | Peterborough Northern Star | |
| 40 | St Albans City | 5–0 | Waveney Wanderers | |
| 41 | St Nicholas | 11–0 | Southampton | |
| 42 | The New Saints | 3–1 | Pegasus | |
| 43 | Torquay United | 0–4 | Swindon Spitfires | |
| 44 | Truro City | 4–0 | Poole Town | |
| 45 | Walsall | 4–2 | Bilbrook | |
| 46 | Westfield | 7–2 | Aylesford | |

== Third qualifying round ==
| Tie | Home team (tier) | Score | Away team (tier) | Att. |
|---|---|---|---|---|
| 1 | AFC Dunstable | 1–5 | Denham United | |
| 2 | Arnold Town | 0–1 | Loughborough Foxes | |
| 3 | Barking | 1–4 | Leverstock Green | |
| 4 | Billericay Town | 0–0 (4–5 p) | Bedford | |
| 5 | Blackpool Wren Rovers | 4–2 | Mossley Hill | |
| 6 | Boldon | 1–3 | Peterlee St Francis | |
| 7 | Bracknell Town | 2–2 (2–4 p) | Crystal Palace | |
| 8 | Brighouse Town | 8–8 (5–4 p) | City of Manchester | |
| 9 | C&K Basildon | 4–0 | Brentwood Town | |
| 10 | Cambridge United | 5–1 | Lowestoft Town | |
| 11 | Chester Le Street Town | 10–1 | Kader | |
| 12 | Chichester City | 8–0 | AFC Wimbledon Development | |
| 13 | Chorley | 2–1 | Morecambe | |
| 14 | Copsewood Coventry | 7–0 | Long Eaton United | |
| 15 | Ebbsfleet United | 5–3 | Ipswich Town | |
| 16 | Enfield Town | 6–2 | St Albans City | |
| 17 | Exeter City | 6–0 | Parley Sports | |
| 18 | FC Reedswood | 3–2 | Mansfield Town | |
| 19 | Gloucester City | 1–0 | Southampton Saints | |
| 20 | Huddersfield Town | 2–1 (a.e.t.) | Stockport County | |
| 21 | Hull City | 4–2 | Curzon Ashton | |
| 22 | Keynsham Town Development | 1–2 | Larkhall Athletic | |
| 23 | KIKK United | 2–2 (3–1 p) | Luton Town | |
| 24 | Leeds City Vixens | 2–2 (1–3 p) | Whitley Bay | |

| Tie | Home team (tier) | Score | Away team (tier) | Att. |
|---|---|---|---|---|
| 25 | Leicester City Ladies | 2–2 (3–2 p) | Leicester City | |
| 26 | Leighton United Vixens | 2–2 (2–4 p) | Milton Keynes Dons | |
| 27 | Liverpool Feds | H–W | Malet Lambert | |
Walkover for Liverpool Feds
| 28 | Loughborough Students | 7–2 | Leafield Athletic | |
| 29 | Maidenhead United | 2–1 | Fulham | |
| 30 | Nettleham | 3–1 | Rotherham United | |
| 31 | Norwich City | 7–1 | Peterborough Northern Star | |
| 32 | Oxford City | 0–5 | Queens Park Rangers | |
| 33 | RACA Tynedale | 2–6 | Middlesbrough | |
| 34 | Raunds Town | 3–3 (3–4 p) | The New Saints | |
| 35 | Rusthall | 1–3 | University Of Portsmouth | |
| 36 | Shanklin | 0–1 | Gosport Borough | |
| 37 | Sheffield United Community | 3–2 | Cheadle Heath Nomads | |
| 38 | St Nicholas | 3–2 | Basingstoke Town | |
| 39 | Swindon Spitfires | 3–2 | Cheltenham Town | |
| 40 | Swindon Town | 0–3 | Forest Green Rovers | |
| 41 | Tranmere Rovers | 6–0 | Wakefield | |
| 42 | Truro City | 0–8 | Plymouth Argyle | |
| 43 | Walsall | 1–4 | Sandiacre Town | |
| 44 | Westfield | 4–1 | London Corinthians | |

== First round proper ==
Matches were played on 1 December 2013.

Number of teams per tier still in competition
| WSL 1 | WSL 2 | Premier Division | Combination | Regional & County | Total |
|---|---|---|---|---|---|
| 8 / 8 | 10 / 10 | 22 / 22 | 24 / 24 | 20 / 20 | 84 / 84 |

| 1 December 2013 | Bedford (5) | W–O | Westfield (5) |
| | | Report |

| 1 December 2013 | Blackpool Wren Rovers (5) | 1–0 | Hull City (5) | Blackpool |
| | Goal | Report | | Stadium: Brews Park |

| 1 December 2013 | C&K Basildon (5) | 2–1 | KIKK United (5) | Basildon |
| | 70'; Nash | Report | Le Marchand | Stadium: Selex Sports & Leisure Club |

| 1 December 2013 | Chester Le Street Town (4) | 0–1 | Tranmere Rovers (4) | Chester-le-Street |
| | | Report | Goal | Stadium: Moor Park |

| 1 December 2013 | Chichester City (4) | 6–0 | Gloucester City (5) | Chichester |
| | Goal | Report | | Stadium: Oaklands Park |

| 1 December 2013 | Chorley (4) | 1–6 | Huddersfield Town (4) | Charnock Richard |
| | Goal | Report | Goal | Stadium: Mossie Park |

| 1 December 2013 | Copsewood (Coventry) (4) | 1–0 | Nettleham (5) | Coventry |
| | Goal | Report | | Stadium: Allard Way |

| 1 December 2013 | Crystal Palace (5) | 2–0 | Maidenhead United (5) | Crystal Palace |
| | Goal | Report | | Stadium: Crystal Palace National Sports Centre |

| 1 December 2013 | Ebbsfleet United (4) | 2–5 (a.e.t.) | Denham United (4) | Strood |
| | Goal | Report | Goal | Stadium: Rochester United Sports Ground |

| 1 December 2013 | Enfield Town (4) | 3–2 | Norwich City (4) | Enfield |
| | Goal | Report | Goal | Stadium: Queen Elizabeth II Stadium |

| 1 December 2013 | Exeter City (4) | 3–1 | Gosport Borough (5) | Exeter |
| | Goal | Report | Timbrell 5' | Stadium: Topsham Sports Ground |

| 1 December 2013 | FC Reedswood (5) | 2–1 (a.e.t.) | Leicester City Ladies (4) | Essington |
| | Goal | Report | Goal | Stadium: Long Lane Park |

| 1 December 2013 | Forest Green Rovers (4) | 0–1 | St Nicholas (5) | Cambridge |
| | | Report | Goal | Stadium: Thornhill Park |

| 1 December 2013 | Larkhall Athletic (4) | 3–0 | Swindon Spitfires (5) | Bath |
| | Goal | Report | | Stadium: Plain Ham |

| 1 December 2013 | Leverstock Green (5) | 0–5 | Queens Park Rangers (4) | Leverstock Green |
| | | Report | Goal | Stadium: Pancake Lane |

| 1 December 2013 | Liverpool Feds (4) | 6–0 | Peterlee St Francis (5) | Allerton |
| | Goal | Report | | Stadium: Heron Eccles Playing Fields |

| 1 December 2013 | Loughborough Foxes (4) | 1–3 (a.e.t.) | Milton Keynes Dons (4) | Loughborough |
| | Goal | Report | Goal | Stadium: Loughborough University Stadium |

| 1 December 2013 | Loughborough Students (4) | 5–2 | Cambridge United (4) | Loughborough |
| | Goal | Report | Goal | Stadium: Derby Road Playing Fields |

| 1 December 2013 | Middlesbrough (4) | 3–2 | Sheffield United Community (4) | Thornaby-on-Tees |
| | Goal | Report | Goal | Stadium: Teesdale Park |

| 1 December 2013 | Plymouth Argyle (4) | W–O | University Of Portsmouth (4) |
| | | Report |

| 1 December 2013 | The New Saints (5) | 4–0 | Sandiacre Town (5) | Oswestry |
| | Goal | Report | | Stadium: Park Hall |

| 1 December 2013 | Whitley Bay (5) | 2–1 | Brighouse Town (5) | Whitley Bay |
| | Goal | Report | Goal | Stadium: Hillheads Park |

== Second round proper ==
Matches were played on 12, 19 and 26 January 2014, and 2 and 9 February 2014.

Number of teams per tier still in competition
| WSL 1 | WSL 2 | Premier Division | Combination | Regional & County | Total |
|---|---|---|---|---|---|
| 8 / 8 | 10 / 10 | 22 / 22 | 13 / 24 | 7 / 20 | 60 / 84 |

| 12 January 2014 | Bedford (5) | 2–3 | Crystal Palace (5) | Wootton |
| | Fensome; Vass | Report | Goal | Stadium: Weston Park |

| 12 January 2014 | Brighton & Hove Albion (3) | 3–2 | Tottenham Hotspur (3) | Withdean |
| | Waine 6'; Kmita 55'; Barton 75' | Report | Goal | Stadium: Withdean Stadium |

| 12 January 2014 | Cardiff City (3) | 3–0 | St Nicholas (5) | Canton |
| | Goal | Report | | Stadium: Cardiff International Sports Campus |

| 12 January 2014 | Chesham United (3) | 1–2 | Larkhall Athletic (4) | Chesham |
| | Fraser 18' | Report | Goal | Stadium: The Meadow |

| 12 January 2014 | Huddersfield Town (4) | 1–4 | Coventry City (3) | Shelley |
| | Goal | Report | Goal | Stadium: Stafflex Arena |

| 12 January 2014 | Lewes (3) | 1–0 (a.e.t.) | Denham United (4) | Lewes |
| | Payne 94' | Report | | Stadium: The Dripping Pan |

| 12 January 2014 | Loughborough Students (4) | 1–4 | Leeds United (3) | Loughborough |
| | Goal | Report | Goal | Stadium: Loughborough Stadium |

| 12 January 2014 | Nottingham Forest (3) | 3–0 | Wolverhampton Wanderers (3) | Hucknall |
| | Greaves 11'; Howard 39', 58' | Report | | Stadium: Aerial Way (RM stadium) |

| 12 January 2014 | Preston North End (3) | W–O | Sporting Club Albion (3) |
| | | Report |

| 12 January 2014 | Queens Park Rangers (4) | 1–2 (a.e.t.) | Gillingham (3) | Greenford |
| | Goal | Report | Carlton 87'; Tune 110' | Stadium: Avenue Park |

| 12 January 2014 | The New Saints (5) | 0–7 | Stoke City (3) | Oswestry |
| | | Report | Goal | Stadium: Park Hall; Attendance: 119 |

| 12 January 2014 | Whitley Bay (5) | 0–1 | Blackburn Rovers (3) | Whitley Bay |
| | | Report | Forster 15' | Stadium: Hillheads Park |

| 19 January 2014 | Charlton Athletic (3) | 3–0 | Milton Keynes Dons (4) | Thamesmead |
| | Clifford 48', 53'; Graham 90' | Report | | Stadium: Bayliss Avenue |

| 19 January 2014 | Derby County (3) | 2–0 | Newcastle United (3) | Burton upon Trent |
| | Goal | Report | | Stadium: St George's Park |

| 19 January 2014 | Middlesbrough (4) | 4–0 | Tranmere Rovers (5) | Thornaby-on-Tees |
| | Goal | Report | | Stadium: Teesdale Park |

| 26 January 2014 | Copsewood Coventry (4) | 2–1 | FC Reedswood (5) | Coventry |
| | Goal | Report | Goal | Stadium: Allard Way |

| 26 January 2014 | Keynsham Town (3) | 4–0 | Portsmouth (3) | Keynsham |
| | | Report | Simmonds 13', 71'; Hillier 18'; Kempson 39' | Stadium: Crown Field |

| 2 February 2014 | Enfield Town (4) | 0–6 | Chichester City (4) | Enfield |
| | | Report | Goal | Stadium: Queen Elizabeth II Stadium |

| 2 February 2014 | Plymouth Argyle (4) | 6–1 | Exeter City (4) | Ivybridge |
| | Goal | Report | Goal | Stadium: Ivybridge Community College |

| 2 February 2014 | Liverpool Feds (4) | 0–10 | Sheffield (3) | Liverpool |
| | | Report | Goal | Stadium: Heron Eccles Playing Fields |

| 9 February 2014 | C&K Basildon (4) | 3–3 (a.e.t.) (2–4 p) | West Ham United (3) | Harlow |
| | Goal | Report | Masters 11'; Blanchflower 55'; Gowland 78' | Stadium: The Harlow Arena |
| | Penalties |
| | Penalty scored Penalty missed | | Penalty scored |

| 16 February 2014 | Bradford City (3) | 7–0 | Blackpool Wren Rovers (5) | Apperley Bridge |
| | Lee 12'; Danby 15', 49'; Hunt 23'; Stuart 32'; Kendell 39'; Sharp 84' | Report | | Stadium: Woodhouse Grove School |

== Third round proper ==
Entering are 10 WSL 2 teams, they are joined by 22 winners of the second round. Matches were played on 9, 16 and 23 February 2014 and 2 March 2014.

Number of teams per tier still in competition
| WSL 1 | WSL 2 | Premier Division | Combination | Regional & County | Total |
|---|---|---|---|---|---|
| 8 / 8 | 10 / 10 | 16 / 22 | 5 / 24 | 1 / 20 | 40 / 84 |

| 9 February 2014 | Aston Villa (2) | 0–2 | Doncaster Rovers Belles (2) | Sutton Coldfield |
| | | Report | Goal | Stadium: Coles Lane |

| 9 February 2014 | Copsewood Coventry (4) | 3–2 (a.e.t.) | Larkhall Athletic (4) | Coventry |
| | Goal | Report | Goal | Stadium: Allard Way; Attendance: 30 |

| 9 February 2014 | Coventry City (3) | 3–1 | Stoke City (3) | Coventry |
| | Goal | Report | Gallagher 75' | Stadium: Coventry Building Society Arena; Attendance: 171 |

| 9 February 2014 | Durham (2) | 4–0 | Chichester City (4) | Houghton-le-Spring |
| | Goal | Report | | Stadium: Leyburn Grove |

| 9 February 2014 | Portsmouth (3) | 3–0 | Lewes (3) | Portsmouth |
| | Hillier 12'; Wilson 20'; Kempson 35' | Report | | Stadium: University of Portsmouth |

| 9 February 2014 | Sunderland (2) | 5–1 | Oxford United (2) | Hetton-le-Hole |
| | Rachel Furness 12', 41'; Bass 24'; Joice 47'; Mead 76' | Report | Fellows 34' | Stadium: The Hetton Centre; Attendance: 160; Referee: Rebecca Welch |

| 16 February 2014 | Blackburn Rovers (3) | 3–0 | Middlesbrough (4) | Ashton-under-Lyne |
| | Manning 57', 63', 70' | Report | | Stadium: Curzon Ashton Arena |

| 16 February 2014 | Charlton Athletic (3) | 0–6 | Sheffield (3) | Thamesmead |
| | | Report | Goal | Stadium: Bayliss Avenue |

| 16 February 2014 | Crystal Palace (5) | 2–0 | Derby County (3) | Crystal Palace |
| | Goal | Report | | Stadium: Crystal Palace National Sports Centre; Attendance: 150 |

| 16 February 2014 | Millwall Lionesses (2) | 1–2 | Reading (2) | Charlton |
| | Goal | Report | Goal | Stadium: Meridian Sports & Social Club |

| 16 February 2014 | Nottingham Forest (3) | 0–1 | Gillingham (3) | Hucknall |
| | | Report | Gurr | Stadium: The Engine Rooms; Attendance: 46 |

| 16 February 2014 | Plymouth Argyle (4) | 0–4 | Brighton & Hove Albion (3) | Plymouth |
| | | Report | Waine 25'; Barton 76'; Merritt 78'; Whitcombe 85' | Stadium: Devonport High School |

| 23 February 2014 | Leeds United (3) | 1–3 | London Bees (2) | Farsley |
| | Goal | Report | Goal | Stadium: Throstle Nest |

| 23 February 2014 | Preston North End (3) | 3–0 | Yeovil Town (2) | Lea |
| | Savage 4', 52'; Jones 80' | Report | | Stadium: University of Lancashire Sports Arena |

| 23 February 2014 | West Ham United (3) | 1–5 | Watford (2) | Thurrock |
| | Morgan 89' | Report | Goal | Stadium: Ship Lane |

| 2 March 2014 | Bradford City (3) | 0–1 | Cardiff City (3) | Thackley |
| | | Report | Townsend 67' | Stadium: Dennyfield |

== Fourth round proper ==
Matches were played on 16 March 2014.

Number of teams per tier still in competition
| WSL 1 | WSL 2 | Premier Division | Combination | Regional & County | Total |
|---|---|---|---|---|---|
| 8 / 8 | 6 / 10 | 8 / 22 | 1 / 24 | 1 / 20 | 24 / 84 |

| 16 March 2014 | Cardiff City (3) | 1–0 (a.e.t.) | London Bees (2) | Cardiff |
| | Cousins 95' | Report | | Stadium: Cardiff International Sports Campus |

| 16 March 2014 | Coventry City (3) | 2–0 | Brighton & Hove Albion (3) | Coventry |
| | Goal | Report | | Stadium: Ricoh Arena |

| 16 March 2014 | Crystal Palace (5) | 2–3 | Portsmouth (3) | South Norwood |
| | Goal | Report | Hillier 12'; Simmonds 18', 34' | Stadium: Croydon Arena; Attendance: 150 |

| 16 March 2014 | Doncaster Rovers Belles (2) | 4–1 | Copsewood (Coventry) (4) | Doncaster |
| | Goal | Report | Goal | Stadium: Keepmoat Stadium; Attendance: 180 |

| 16 March 2014 | Durham (2) | 3–1 | Sheffield (3) | Houghton-le-Spring |
| | Goal | Report | Goal | Stadium: Leyburn Grove |

| 16 March 2014 | Gillingham (3) | 1–0 | Preston North End (3) | Chatham |
| | Goal | Report | | Stadium: The Bauvill Stadium |

| 16 March 2014 | Reading (2) | 2–0 (a.e.t.) | Blackburn Rovers (3) | Farnborough |
| | Goal | Report | | Stadium: Cherrywood Road |

| 16 March 2014 | Sunderland (2) | 4–1 | Watford (2) | Hetton-le-Hole |
| | Wilson 20'; Mead 27', 43'; Joice 29' | Report | Goal | Stadium: The Hetton Centre; Attendance: 152 |

== Fifth round proper ==
Entering this round are the eight WSL 1 teams, they join eight winners of the fourth round. Played on 13 April 2014.

Number of teams per tier still in competition
| WSL 1 | WSL 2 | Premier Division | Combination | Regional & County | Total |
|---|---|---|---|---|---|
| 8 / 8 | 4 / 10 | 4 / 22 | 0 / 24 | 0 / 20 | 16 / 84 |

| 13 April 2014 | Arsenal (1) | 2–0 | Gillingham (3) | Borehamwood |
| | Smith 63', 81' (pen.) | Report | | Stadium: Meadow Park; Attendance: 458; Referee: Jairo Marin |

| 13 April 2014 | Chelsea (1) | 2–1 (a.e.t.) | Bristol Academy (1) | Staines-upon-Thames |
| | Ji 8'; R. Williams 110' | Report | Natalia 29' (pen.) | Stadium: Wheatsheaf Park; Attendance: 271; Referee: Paul Kelly |

| 13 April 2014 | Birmingham City (1) | 3–1 | Doncaster Rovers Belles (2) | Solihull |
| | Allen 8'; Linnett 88'; Potter 90' | Report | Little 73' | Stadium: Damson Park; Attendance: 363 |

| 13 April 2014 | Manchester City (1) | 2–1 | Reading (2) | Manchester |
| | Duggan 8', 79' | Report | McGee 13' | Stadium: Academy Stadium; Attendance: 253 |

| 13 April 2014 | Notts County (1) | 2–1 | Coventry City (3) | Nottingham |
| | Susi 23', 77' | Report | Clough | Stadium: Meadow Lane; Attendance: 309; Referee: Robert Atkin |

| 13 April 2014 | Sunderland (2) | 0–2 | Liverpool (1) | Hetton-le-Hole |
| | | Report | Harris 7'; Dowie 58' | Stadium: The Hetton Centre; Attendance: 308 |

| 13 April 2014 | Cardiff City (3) | 1–3 | Everton (1) | Cardiff |
| | Townsend 58' | Report | Jones 5'; Hinnigan 36'; Parris 71' | Stadium: Cardiff International Sports Stadium; Attendance: 112; Referee: Simon Shaw |

| 13 April 2014 | Portsmouth (3) | 2–1 | Durham (2) | Gosport |
| | Simmons 53'; Wilson 86' | Report | Jennings 48' | Stadium: Privett Park; Attendance: 126; Referee: I Homewood |

== Quarter–finals ==
The 6th round, also known as the quarter–finals, draw was made on 14 April 2014. The matches will be played on Sunday 27 April unless the clubs agree otherwise. The winners advance into the semi–finals and receive £1,000 in prize money. Seven teams play in the WSL 1, Portsmouth Ladies play in the Women’s Premier 2nd Level, which is the fourth level.

Number of teams per tier still in competition
| WSL 1 | WSL 2 | Premier Division | Combination | Regional & County | Total |
|---|---|---|---|---|---|
| 7 / 8 | 0 / 10 | 1 / 22 | 0 / 24 | 0 / 20 | 8 / 84 |

| 27 April 2014 | Portsmouth (3) | 0–2 | Notts County (1) | Gosport |
| 14:00 | | Report | Bradley 72'; Clarke 75' | Stadium: Privett Park; Attendance: 410 |

| 26 April 2014 | Liverpool (1) | 0–2 | Everton (1) | Widnes |
| | | Report | Parris 10'; Greenwood 30' | Stadium: Halton Stadium |

| 27 April 2014 | Manchester City (1) | 1–3 | Chelsea (1) | Manchester |
| 14:00 | Duggan 10' | Report | Coombs 7'; Aluko 16'; Chapman 59' | Stadium: Manchester Regional Arena |

| 4 May 2014 | Birmingham City (1) | 1–2 | Arsenal (1) | Solihull |
| 12:00 | Allen 30' | Report | Smith 39' (pen.); Ayisi 54' | Stadium: Damson Park; Attendance: 487; Referee: Geoffrey Laws |

== Semi–finals ==
The draw for the semi–finals was made on 14 April, with the venues for the matches to be decided at a later date. The matches will be played on 11 May. Only WSL 1 teams remain. On 30 April the FA announced that Woking’s Kingfield Stadium and Alfreton’s Impact Arena will host the matches.

Number of teams per tier still in competition
| WSL 1 | WSL 2 | Premier Division | Combination | Regional & County | Total |
|---|---|---|---|---|---|
| 4 / 8 | 0 / 10 | 0 / 22 | 0 / 24 | 0 / 20 | 4 / 84 |

| 11 May 2014 | Chelsea (1) | 3–5 (a.e.t.) | Arsenal (1) | Woking |
| 14:00 | Ji 69'; Ogimi 85'; Aluko 104' | Report | Smith 70', 86'; Carter 93'; Ohno 99'; Stoney 109' | Stadium: Kingfield Stadium; Attendance: 877; Referee: Sian Piret |

| 11 May 2014 | Notts County (1) | 1–2 | Everton (1) | Alfreton |
| 14:00 | Hoyle 55' | Report | Parris 14', 29' | Stadium: Impact Arena; Attendance: 638; Referee: Elizabeth Simms |

== Final ==
On 15 February 2014, the FA announced that the final would be held at Stadium mk and will kick off at 16:30 on 1 June. In May 2014 Martin Atkinson was named the referee for the final with Lindsey Robinson and Mark Dwyer as assistants with Rebecca Welch serving as the fourth official. The match was broadcast live on BBC Two.

1 June 2014
16:30

| Arsenal | 2–0 | Everton |
|---|---|---|
| Smith 15'; Kinga 61' | Report |

Stadium mk, Milton Keynes
Attendance: 15,098
Referee: Martin Atkinson
