= Westfield Ladies F.C. =

Westfield Ladies Football Club
- Founded: 2009
- Ground: Woking Park
- Capacity: 1,000
- Chairman: Steve Kick
- Manager: Paul Nicholls
- League: London and South East Women's Regional Football League
- 2011–12: London and South East Women's Regional Football League, 3rd
| Home colours | Away colours |

Westfield Ladies were the women's football team affiliated with Westfield F.C., based in Westfield, Woking, Surrey. The team competed in the London and South East Women's Regional Football League.

== History ==
Westfield Ladies were formed in 2009 and in their opening season they won the London and South East Regional Division One Women's Football League and the John Greenacre Memorial Trophy Final. After winning the trophy the goalscorers were interviewed in the club's first web based TV coverage.

After promotion to the Premier Division the team finished fourth in 2010–11. During the summer, improvements to the squad and facilities were undertaken as the club harboured ambitions of reaching Combination level. During season 2011–12, the ladies had their best ever run in the FA Women's Cup, by reaching the First Round Proper.

The club had links with teams in the FA Women's Premier League and FA County Leagues; and in the summer of 2012 they also formed links with both AC and Inter Milan Ladies. This enables them to facilitate loan agreements to help develop players, as well as developing the club. The squad includes a mix of players from previous clubs such as Reading, Fulham, Crystal Palace, Sheffield United, QPR, and Chelsea.

The Management and Committee act as volunteers and receive no wage or financial support for their time. The Ladies' team is a non-profit making organisation, and is self-funded, operating purely on contributions received by the players and sponsors.

== Ground ==
Westfield Ladies played at Woking Park, Elmbridge Lane, Woking Surrey. Their ground redevelopment was completed in August 2011 to a new multi million pounds facility provided by Woking Borough Council.

== Performance ==
- London and South East Regional Division One 2009–10: 1st (promoted)
- London and South East Regional Premier Division 2010–11: 4th
- London and South East Regional Premier Division 2011–12: 3rd

== Playing squad ==
Note: Flags indicate national team as defined under FIFA eligibility rules; some limited exceptions apply. Players may hold more than one non-FIFA nationality.

| No. | Pos. | Nation | Player |
|---|---|---|---|
| — | GK | ENG | Emily Bourne |
| — | GK | ENG | Jemma Kenaghan |
| — | DF | ENG | Alysha Frampton |
| — | DF | ENG | Victoria Wenman |
| — | DF | ENG | Helen Bridgman |
| — | MF | ENG | Lizzie Laws |

| No. | Pos. | Nation | Player |
|---|---|---|---|
| — | MF | ENG | Laura Hann |
| — | MF | ENG | Rebecca Sargeant |
| — | MF | ENG | Emma Barnes |
| — | MF | ENG | Rebecca Galbraith |
| — | MF | ENG | Hannah Pearson |
| — | FW | ENG | Laura Low |
| — | FW | ENG | Camila Willis |

== Staff ==
- Manager/Coach – Paul Nicholls
- Assistant Manager/Coach – Chris Lyons
- Ladies Chairman/Secretary – Steve Kick
