= 2012 Arsenal L.F.C. season =

English women's football club season

Arsenal Ladies
2012 season
- Chairman: Peter Hill-Wood
- Manager: Laura Harvey
- Stadium: Meadow Park; Emirates Stadium (Select home games)
- WSL: Champions
- FA Cup: Semi-finals
- WSL Cup: Winners
- Champions League: Semi-finals
- Top goalscorer: League: Kim Little (11); All: Kim Little (19)
- Highest home attendance: 5,052 (vs Chelsea, 26 April 2012)
- Biggest win: 6–0 (vs Bobruichanka (H), UWCL, 8 October 2011)
- Biggest defeat: 0–2 (vs 1. FFC Frankfurt (A), UWCL, 21 April 2012); 0–2 (vs Chelsea (A), FA Cup, 3 May 2012)
Home colours	Away colours	Third colours

2012 Arsenal L.F.C. season
Home colours	Away colours	Third colours

The 2012 season was Arsenal Ladies Football Club's 25th season since forming in 1987. The club participated in the second edition of the FA WSL, England's top flight for women's football since 2011, winning it for a second season in a row with an unbeaten campaign. Arsenal also played in the FA Women's Cup, and the FA WSL Cup, winning the latter against Birmingham City in October. They also competed in the UEFA Women's Champions League, losing at the Semi Final stage to Frankfurt.

As this season bridged the gap between the Men's Team's 2011–12 and 2012–13 seasons, the team wore two different sets of kits during each half of the season.

== Squad information & statistics ==
=== First team squad ===
Squad statistics correct as of May 2018

Squad No.	Name	Date of birth (age)	Since	Last Contract	Signed from
Goalkeepers
1	(Republic of Ireland) Emma Byrne	14 June 1979 (aged 33)	2000		(Denmark) Fortuna Hjørring
13	(Jamaica) Becky Spencer	22 February 1991 (aged 21)	2012		(England) Birmingham City
31	(England) Sophie Harris	25 August 1994 (aged 18)	2010		(England) Lincoln City
35	(Northern Ireland) Nicole Adams	13 February 1995 (aged 17)	2012		(England) Arsenal Academy
Defenders
2	(England) Steph Houghton	23 April 1988 (aged 24)	2010	August 2010	(England) Leeds Carnegie
3	(Republic of Ireland) Yvonne Tracy	27 February 1981 (aged 31)	2000		(Republic of Ireland) St Patrick's Athletic
5	(England) Gilly Flaherty	24 August 1991 (aged 21)	2006		(England) Arsenal Academy
6	(England) Faye White (c)	2 February 1978 (aged 34)	1996		(England) Three Bridges
19	(Republic of Ireland) Niamh Fahey	13 October 1987 (aged 25)	2008		(Republic of Ireland) Salthill Devon
22	(England) Alex Scott	14 October 1984 (aged 28)	2012	March 2012	(United States) Boston Breakers
25	(Wales) Hayley Ladd	6 October 1993 (aged 19)	2009		(England) St Albans City
Midfielders
4	(Wales) Jayne Ludlow	7 January 1979 (aged 33)	2000		(England) Southampton Saints
7	(Republic of Ireland) Ciara Grant	17 May 1978 (aged 34)	1998		(Republic of Ireland) St Patrick's Athletic
8	(England) Jordan Nobbs	8 December 1992 (aged 19)	2010	August 2010	(England) Sunderland
16	(Scotland) Kim Little	26 September 1990 (aged 22)	2008		(Scotland) Hibernian
17	(England) Katie Chapman	15 June 1982 (aged 30)	2010	November 2010	(United States) Chicago Red Stars
28	(Wales) Angharad James ‡	1 June 1994 (aged 18)	2011		(England) Arsenal Academy
30	(England) Bianca Bragg	14 January 1994 (aged 18)	2011		(England) Arsenal Academy
32	(England) Melissa Lawley ‡	28 April 1994 (aged 18)	2011		(England) Arsenal Academy
Forwards
9	(England) Ellen White	9 May 1989 (aged 23)	2010	July 2010	(England) Leeds Carnegie
11	(England) Rachel Yankey	1 November 1979 (aged 32)	2005		(United States) New Jersey Wildcats
12	(England) Gemma Davison	17 April 1987 (aged 25)	2012		(United States) Sky Blue FC
14	(Scotland) Jen Beattie	13 May 1991 (aged 21)	2009		(Scotland) Celtic
15	(England) Danielle Carter	18 May 1993 (aged 19)	2009		(England) Arsenal Academy
20	(England) Lauren Bruton	22 November 1992 (aged 19)	2008		(England) Arsenal Academy
23	(England) Kelly Smith	29 October 1978 (aged 34)	2012	March 2012	(United States) Boston Breakers

‡ = Player played in the earlier rounds of the UEFA Women's Champions League, but departed Arsenal before the start of the WSL Season

=== Appearances and goals ===
No.	Name	WSL		FA Cup		WSL Cup		UWCL		Total	
No.	Name	Apps	Goals	Apps	Goals	Apps	Goals	Apps	Goals	Apps	Goals
Goalkeepers
1	(Republic of Ireland) Emma Byrne	13	0	3	0	4	0	6	0	26	0
13	(Jamaica) Rebecca Spencer	0	0	0	0	0	0	2	0	2	0
31	(England) Sophie Harris	1	0	0	0	1	0	0	0	2	0
35	(Northern Ireland) Nicole Adams	0	0	0	0	0	0	0	0	0	0
Defenders
2	(England) Steph Houghton	12+2	1	3	0	5	2	8	0	28+2	3
3	(Republic of Ireland) Yvonne Tracy	1+1	0	0	0	2	0	1+1	0	4+2	0
5	(England) Gilly Flaherty	11+2	0	3	0	4	0	8	0	26+2	0
6	(England) Faye White (c)	0	0	0	0	0+1	0	0	0	0+1	0
19	(Republic of Ireland) Niamh Fahey	11+1	0	3	0	3	0	8	0	25+1	0
22	(England) Alex Scott	12+1	0	2+1	0	5	0	4	0	23+2	0
25	(Wales) Hayley Ladd	0	0	0	0	0	0	0	0	0	0
Midfielders
4	(Wales) Jayne Ludlow	4+1	0	2	0	1	0	7	1	14+1	1
7	(Republic of Ireland) Ciara Grant	12	0	3	0	4+1	0	7	1	26+1	1
8	(England) Jordan Nobbs	12+1	5	2	0	3+1	1	4+3	4	21+5	10
16	(Scotland) Kim Little	13+1	11	3	1	4	4	8	3	28+1	19
17	(England) Katie Chapman	13+1	5	3	0	4	0	8	2	28+1	7
28	(Wales) Angharad James ‡	0	0	0	0	0	0	0+1	0	0+1	0
30	(England) Bianca Bragg	0+1	0	0	0	0+1	0	0+1	0	0+3	0
32	(England) Melissa Lawley ‡	0	0	0	0	0	0	0+1	0	0+1	0
Forwards
9	(England) Ellen White	4+6	3	2	2	1+3	1	7+1	2	14+10	8
11	(England) Rachel Yankey	11+1	2	2	0	5	1	5+2	1	23+3	4
12	(England) Gemma Davison	11+3	2	0+1	0	3+2	1	0+3	0	14+9	3
14	(Scotland) Jen Beattie	4+7	3	1+1	0	2+3	3	1+5	3	8+16	9
15	(England) Danielle Carter	5+3	1	1+1	0	2+1	0	4+3	3	12+8	4
20	(England) Lauren Bruton	0	0	0	0	0	0	0	0	0	0
23	(England) Kelly Smith	4+3	4	0	0	2	1	0	0	6+3	5

=== Goalscorers ===
Rank	No.	Position	Name	WSL	FA Cup	WSL Cup	UWCL	Total
1	16	MF	(Scotland) Kim Little	11	1	4	3	19
2	8	MF	(England) Jordan Nobbs	5	0	1	4	10
3	14	FW	(Scotland) Jen Beattie	3	0	3	3	9
4	9	FW	(England) Ellen White	3	2	1	2	8
5	17	MF	(England) Katie Chapman	5	0	0	2	7
6	23	FW	(England) Kelly Smith	4	0	1	0	5
7	11	FW	(England) Rachel Yankey	2	0	1	1	4
7	15	FW	(England) Danielle Carter	1	0	0	3	4
9	12	FW	(England) Gemma Davison	2	0	1	0	3
9	2	DF	(England) Steph Houghton	1	0	2	0	3
11	4	MF	(Wales) Jayne Ludlow	0	0	0	1	1
11	7	MF	(Republic of Ireland) Ciara Grant	0	0	0	1	1
Own goal				2	0	0	0	2
Total				39	3	14	20	76

=== Disciplinary record ===
Rank	No.	Position	Name	WSL		FA Cup		WSL Cup		UWCL		Total	
Rank	No.	Position	Name	Booked	Sent off (straight red)	Booked	Sent off (straight red)	Booked	Sent off (straight red)	Booked	Sent off (straight red)	Booked	Sent off (straight red)
1	17	MF	(England) Katie Chapman	3	0	0	0	0	0	2	0	5	0
2	2	DF	(England) Steph Houghton	1	0	0	0	1	0	0	0	2	0
2	1	GK	(Republic of Ireland) Emma Byrne	1	0	0	0	0	0	1	0	2	0
2	11	FW	(England) Rachel Yankey	1	0	0	0	1	0	0	0	2	0
5	5	DF	(England) Gilly Flaherty	1	0	0	0	0	0	0	0	1	0
5	16	MF	(Scotland) Kim Little	1	0	0	0	0	0	0	0	1	0
5	12	FW	(England) Gemma Davison	1	0	0	0	0	0	0	0	1	0
5	9	FW	(England) Ellen White	1	0	0	0	0	0	0	0	1	0
5	7	MF	(Republic of Ireland) Ciara Grant	1	0	0	0	0	0	0	0	1	0
5	22	DF	(England) Alex Scott	1	0	0	0	0	0	0	0	1	0
5	19	DF	(Republic of Ireland) Niamh Fahey	0	0	0	0	1	0	0	0	1	0
5	8	MF	(England) Jordan Nobbs	0	0	0	0	0	0	1	0	1	0
5	4	MF	(Wales) Jayne Ludlow	0	0	0	0	0	0	1	0	1	0
Total				12	0	0	0	3	0	5	0	20	0

=== Clean sheets ===
Rank	No.	Name	WSL	FA Cup	WSL Cup	UWCL	Total
1	1	(Republic of Ireland) Emma Byrne	2	1	4	0	7
2	13	(Jamaica) Rebecca Spencer	0	0	0	2	2
3	31	(England) Sophie Harris	1	0	0	0	1
Total			3	1	4	2	10

== Transfers, loans and other signings ==
=== Transfers in ===
Announcement date	No.	Position	Player	From club
9 March 2012	22	DF	(England) Alex Scott	(United States) Boston Breakers
9 March 2012	23	FW	(England) Kelly Smith	(United States) Boston Breakers
March 2012	12	FW	(England) Gemma Davison	(United States) Sky Blue FC
March 2012	13	GK	(Jamaica) Rebecca Spencer	(France) ASJ Soyaux

=== Transfers out ===
Announcement date	No.	Position	Player	To club
December 2011	13	GK	(Jamaica) Rebecca Spencer	(France) ASJ Soyaux
2011	10	FW	(Scotland) Julie Fleeting	Maternity
13 March 2012	28	MF	(Wales) Angharad James	(England) Bristol Academy
13 March 2012	32	MF	(England) Melissa Lawley	(England) Bristol Academy
March 2012	13	GK	(Jamaica) Rebecca Spencer	(England) Birmingham City

=== Loans out ===
Announcement date	No.	Position	Player	To club
June 2012	25	DF	(Wales) Hayley Ladd	(Finland) Kokkola Futis 10

== Club ==
=== Kit (2011-12) ===
Supplier: Nike / Sponsor: Fly Emirates

Home alt.	Away	Goalkeeper 1	Goalkeeper 2	Goalkeeper 3

=== Kit information ===
Arsenal's home, away, third and goalkeeper outfits featured an anniversary crest to mark the club's 125th anniversary. The crest featured 15 laurel leaves on the left side of the crest to reflect the detail on the reverse of the sixpence pieces paid by 15 men to establish the Club in Woolwich in 1886. The 15 oak leaves to the right of the crest paid tribute to the founders who would meet in the local Royal Oak pub. Underneath the crest was one of the club's first recorded mottos – "Forward" – with the anniversary dates of 1886 and 2011 either side.

- Home: The home kit was based on Nike Classic 2011 template in the club's traditional red and white colours, with red trim on the arms.
- Away: The away kit was based on Nike Harlequin 2011 template. The front of the away kit was divided into two-halves in navy blue and one turquoise, inspired by some of the away kits in the 1990s which featured the same colour scheme. The diagonal design represented the gnomon (the pointer) which casts the shadow on a sundial – to commemorate the original Dial Square sundial on the site of the Arsenal munitions factory in Woolwich, where the club was founded in 1886. The back of the shirt was entirely navy blue, with one sleeve navy and the other turquoise. A stripe runs down each sleeves, broken into three parts to further represent the Dial Square sundial. The away shorts were navy blue, as were the socks
- Third: The yellow/maroon away kit from last season was retained as a third kit with 125th anniversary celebratory maroon badge.
- Keeper: The goalkeeper kits featured a stunning graphic running down from the bottom of the arms to the side of the shirt, which was part of Nike's 2011 goalkeeper template also worn by other clubs as well. The first-choice kit was mainly navy with orange detailing. The alternative kits were dark green with yellow detailing and grey with turquoise detailing, respectively.

==== Kit usage (2011-12) ====
Kit	Combination	Usage	
Home alt.	Red body; White sleeves; White shorts; Red socks.	WSL	Everton (H); Chelsea (H); Lincoln (A); Bristol Academy (A); Birmingham City (H); Chelsea (A)
Home alt.	Red body; White sleeves; White shorts; Red socks.	FA Cup	Lincoln (A); Everton (H); Chelsea (A)
Home alt.	Red body; White sleeves; White shorts; Red socks.	WSL Cup	Lincoln (A); Chelsea (H)
Home alt.	Red body; White sleeves; White shorts; Red socks.	UWCL	Bobruichanka (A); Bobruichanka (H); Rayo Vallecano (H); Göteborg (H); Göteborg (A); 1. FFC Frankfurt (H); 1. FFC Frankfurt (A)
Away	Blue and navy body; Blue and navy sleeves; Navy shorts; Navy socks.	WSL	Liverpool (A)
Away	Blue and navy body; Blue and navy sleeves; Navy shorts; Navy socks.	WSL Cup	Liverpool (A)
Away	Blue and navy body; Blue and navy sleeves; Navy shorts; Navy socks.	UWCL	Rayo Vallecano (A)

=== Kit (2012-13) ===
Supplier: Nike / Sponsor: Fly Emirates

Home	Away	Away alt. 1	Goalkeeper 1	Goalkeeper 2	Goalkeeper 2 alt.	Goalkeeper 3	Goalkeeper 3 alt.

=== Kit information ===
Nike released a new set of home, away and goalkeeper kits for the 2012–13 season. The club reverted to their traditional crest, after using an anniversary crest last season.

- Home: During the final two years with Nike, Nike ditched the white sleeves the club's well known for. The shirt has a white wide stripe on each sleeve, flanked by two dark red, narrower stripes. It has a red V-neck collar which is the same colour as the primary shirt colour. The shirt is complemented by white shorts with a dark-red trim, and white socks with a red horizontal stripe. Red socks with white horizontal stripe were used in some away games. Arsenal revealed that the kit would be used for the next two seasons.
- Away: Arsenal's new away kit, was revealed on 12 July 2012, with the much speculated purple and black hooped kit being officially confirmed. The reason behind the kit was to commemorate Arsenal's past, enhancing the "royal" theme from the Diamond Jubilee to remind Arsenal fans of the Royal Arsenal that once existed through the colour purple. The shirt featured red cuffs and detailing, and additionally featured hoops of different width on the arms. The purple and black hooped socks, bearing one red stripe each, paid tribute to Chapman's legacy and his introduction of hooped socks, which according to him, was said to make it easier for his players to pick each other out on the pitch. The hoops and red trim on the sleeves was designed the kit a modern and unique flavour to distinguish the club from others in the Premier League.
- Third: Arsenal's yellow and maroon 2010–11 away kit was retained as a third kit yet again with club badge reverted to traditional badge after last season with anniversary badge.
- Keeper: Nike launched a new set of goalkeeper strips for the 2012–13 season. The primary strip was predominantly green featuring several tones of the same colour on the arms. The alternatives were pink and gold, based on the same template.

==== Kit usage (2012-13) ====
Kit	Combination	Usage	
Home	Red body; White sleeves; White shorts; White socks.	WSL	Everton (A); Doncaster Rovers Belles (A); Bristol Academy (H); Lincoln (H); Liverpool (H); Doncaster Rovers Belles (H); Birmingham City (A)
Home	Red body; White sleeves; White shorts; White socks.	WSL Cup	Bristol Academy (A); Birmingham City (N)
Away	Purple and black hooped body; Purple and black hooped sleeves; Black short; Red socks.	N/A	N/A
Away alt. 1	Purple and black hooped body; Purple and black hooped sleeves; White shorts; White socks.	WSL	Doncaster Rovers Belles (A)

== Competitions ==
=== Overall record ===
Competition	First match	Last match	Starting round	Final position	Record							
Competition	First match	Last match	Starting round	Final position	Pld	W	D	L	GF	GA	GD	Win %
FA WSL	8 April 2012	7 October 2012	Matchday 1	Winners	14	10	4	0	39	18	+21	71.43
FA Women's Cup	13 March 2012	3 May 2012	Fifth round	Semi-finals	3	2	0	1	3	3	+0	66.67
FA WSL Cup	18 March 2012	10 October 2012	Group stage	Winners	5	4	0	1	14	4	+10	80.00
UEFA Women's Champions League	29 September 2011	21 April 2012	Round of 32	Semi-finals	8	4	1	3	20	8	+12	50.00
Total					30	20	5	5	76	33	+43	66.67

Source: FA WSL

=== FA WSL ===
==== Partial league table ====
Pos	Team	Pld	W	D	L	GF	GA	GD	Pts	Qualification
1	Arsenal (C)	14	10	4	0	39	18	+21	34	Qualification for the Champions League knockout phase
2	Birmingham City	14	7	5	2	31	18	+13	26	Qualification for the Champions League knockout phase
3	Everton	14	7	4	3	20	16	+4	25	
4	Bristol Academy	14	4	6	4	17	16	+1	18	
5	Lincoln	14	5	3	6	24	26	−2	18	

Source: FA WSL results
Rules for classification: 1) Points; 2) Goal difference; 3) Number of goals scored
(C) Champions

==== Results summary ====
Overall								Home						Away					
Pld	W	D	L	GF	GA	GD	Pts	W	D	L	GF	GA	GD	W	D	L	GF	GA	GD
14	10	4	0	39	18	+21	34	6	1	0	20	10	+10	4	3	0	19	8	+11

==== Results by matchday ====
Matchday	1	2	3	4	5	6	7	8	9	10	11	12	13	14
Ground	H	H	A	A	A	H	A	A	A	H	H	H	H	A
Result	W	W	W	D	W	W	W	D	W	D	W	W	W	D
Position	1	1	1	1	1	1	1	1	1	1	1	1	1	1

Updated to match(es) played on 20 May 2018. Source: FA WSL
W = Win; D = Draw; L = Loss

==== Matches ====
8 April 2012 1	Arsenal	3–2	Everton	Borehamwood
13:30 BST	Carter 18'; Nobbs 28'; K. Little (penalty missed) 50'; Chapman 65' (yellow card) 90'; Flaherty (yellow card) 75'; Houghton (yellow card) 78'	Report	Duggan 6', 58'; Chaplen (yellow card) 15' (yellow-red card) 39'	Stadium: Meadow Park; Referee: Robert Massey-Ellis

26 April 2012 2	Arsenal	3–1	Chelsea	Holloway, London
19:45 BST	K. Little 47', 90+3'; Chapman 68' (yellow card); Byrne (yellow card)	Report	Longhurst 76'	Stadium: Emirates Stadium; Attendance: 5,052; Referee: Tim Robinson

6 May 2012 3	Liverpool	0–2	Arsenal	Skelmersdale
14:00 BST		Report	K. Little 38' (pen.), 58' (pen.)	Stadium: Skelmersdale Ormskirk Stadium; Referee: Barry Cropp

20 May 2012 4	Lincoln	3–3	Arsenal	Lincoln
14:00 BST	McCallum 26'; Harris 39'; Daly 73'; Hamilton (yellow card)	Report	Yankey 18'; K. Little 66', 85' (yellow card); Chapman (yellow card)	Stadium: Ashby Avenue

30 May 2012 5	Bristol Academy	0–3	Arsenal	Stoke Gifford
19:45 BST		Report	Davison 29' (yellow card) 77'; Nobbs 44'; Beattie 87'	Stadium: Stoke Gifford Stadium; Attendance: 1,107; Referee: Mark Pottage

24 June 2012 6	Arsenal	4–2	Birmingham City	Borehamwood
14:00 BST	Davison 25'; K. Little 31'; Houghton 47'; Beattie 70'	Report	Weston (yellow card) 45'; Williams 60' (yellow card) 60'; Moore (yellow card) 75'; Taylor 83'	Stadium: Meadow Park; Attendance: 809; Referee: Dean Treleaven

5 July 2012 7	Chelsea	2–4	Arsenal	Staines
19:00 BST	Buet 13', 43' (pen.)	Report	K. Little 10' (pen.), 84'; Smith 72', 81'; White (yellow card) 45'; Yankey (yellow card) 80'	Stadium: Wheatsheaf Park; Attendance: 326; Referee: Steven Rea

19 August 2012 8	Everton	2–2	Arsenal	Crosby
14:00 BST	Williams 36' (yellow card) 47'; Bronze 63'; Brown (yellow card) 40'	Report	K. Little 48' (pen.); Nobbs 77'; Grant (yellow card) 71'	Stadium: Rossett Park; Attendance: 618; Referee: Michael Salisbury

25 August 2012 9	Doncaster Rovers Belles	0–4	Arsenal	Doncaster
18:00 BST		Report	Nobbs 5', 18'; Chapman 42'; K. Little 76'	Stadium: Keepmoat Stadium; Attendance: 376; Referee: Marc Edwards

30 August 2012 10	Arsenal	1–1	Bristol Academy	Borehamwood
19:45 BST	Smith 61'; A. Scott (yellow card) 81'	Report	Harding 20'	Stadium: Meadow Park; Attendance: 987; Referee: Anthony Da Costa

9 September 2012 11	Arsenal	2–1	Lincoln	Borehamwood
14:00 BST	Beattie 25'; Yankey 37'	Report	Allen 80' (pen.)	Stadium: Meadow Park; Attendance: 571; Referee: Gavin Muge

23 September 2012 12	Arsenal	4–1	Liverpool	Borehamwood
14:00 BST	Chapman 19', 22'; White 88', 89'	Report	Brusell 66'	Stadium: Meadow Park; Attendance: 464; Referee: Alan Dale

30 September 2012 13	Arsenal	3–2	Doncaster Rovers Belles	Borehamwood
14:00 BST	Cunningham 16' (o.g.); Oxtoby 31' (o.g.); Smith 81'	Report	O'Gorman 20' (yellow card) 23'; L. Little 88'	Stadium: Meadow Park; Attendance: 712; Referee: Sasa Ihringova

7 October 2012 14	Birmingham City	1–1	Arsenal	Tiddington
14:00 BST	Simpkins 33'	Report	White 48'	Stadium: Knights Lane; Attendance: 715; Referee: Massey

=== FA Women's Cup ===
11 March 2012 Fifth round	Lincoln	0–1	Arsenal	Lincoln
14:00 GMT	Alleway (yellow card) 30'	Report	White 16'	Stadium: Ashby Avenue; Attendance: 364; Referee: Robert Ellis

25 March 2012 Quarter-finals	Arsenal	2–1	Everton	Borehamwood
14:00 BST	White 59'; K. Little 64'	Report	Hinnigan 87'	Stadium: Meadow Park; Attendance: 414

3 May 2012 Semi-finals	Chelsea	2–0	Arsenal	Brentford
19:45 BST	Bleazard 22'; Susi 85'	Report		Stadium: Griffin Park; Attendance: 358; Referee: Paul Forrester
Note: Kick-off was delayed by 15 minutes

=== FA WSL Cup ===
==== Group stage ====
Pos	Team	Pld	W	D	L	GF	GA	GD	Pts	Qualification	LIN	ARS	CHE	LIV
1	Lincoln	3	3	0	0	9	6	+3	9	Advance to knock-out stage	—	4–3	—	3–2
2	Arsenal	3	2	0	1	9	4	+5	6	Advance to knock-out stage	—	—	3–0	—
3	Chelsea	3	1	0	2	3	6	−3	3		1–2	—	—	2–1
4	Liverpool	3	0	0	3	3	8	−5	0		—	0–3	—	—

18 March 2012 1	Liverpool	0–3	Arsenal	Skelmersdale
14:00 GMT (UTC+0)		Report	Beattie 16'; Houghton 25'; White 68'	Stadium: Skelmersdale Ormskirk Stadium

13 May 2012 2	Lincoln	4–3	Arsenal	Lincoln
14:00 BST	Sargeant 21'; Tracy 30' (o.g.); Allen 71' (pen.); Harris 90'	Report	K. Little (penalty missed) 6' 6', 66'; Houghton 36'	Stadium: Ashby Avenue

10 June 2012 3	Arsenal	3–0	Chelsea	Borehamwood
14:00 BST	Nobbs 22'; K. Little 58' (pen.); Beattie 81'	Report	Ingle (yellow card) 31'	Stadium: Meadow Park; Attendance: 634; Referee: Ashvin Degnarain

==== Knockout stage ====
3 September 2012 Semi-finals	Bristol Academy	0–4	Arsenal	Stoke Gifford
19:30 BST		Report	Davison 39'; Yankey (yellow card) 56' (goal) 73'; Smith 70'; Beattie 82'; Fahey (yellow card) 85'	Stadium: Stoke Gifford Stadium; Attendance: 570; Referee: Adam Bromley

10 October 2012 Final	Birmingham City	0–1	Arsenal	Barnet
19:00 BST		Report	Houghton (yellow card) 70'; K. Little 82'	Stadium: Underhill Stadium; Attendance: 2,535; Referee: Robert Massey-Ellis

=== UEFA Women's Champions League ===
==== Knockout phase ====
===== Round of 32 =====
29 September 2011 First leg	Bobruichanka (Belarus)	0–4	(England) Arsenal	Bobruisk
14:00 BST		Report	White 9'; Nobbs 64'; Beattie 76'; Chapman 88' (pen.)	Stadium: Spartak Stadium; Attendance: 2,050; Referee: Pernilla Larsson (Sweden)

5 October 2011 Second leg	Arsenal (England)	6–0	(Belarus) Bobruichanka	Borehamwood
17:00 BST	Carter 13', 30'; Chapman 41'; Beattie 57', 60'; Nobbs 65'	Report	Astasheva (yellow card) 86'	Stadium: Meadow Park; Attendance: 209; Referee: Séverine Zinck (France)

===== Round of 16 =====
3 November 2011 First leg	Rayo Vallecano (Spain)	1–1	(England) Arsenal	Madrid
19:00 GMT (UTC+0)	Natalia 31'	Report	K. Little 3'; Byrne (yellow card) 61'	Stadium: Ciudad Deportiva Fundación Rayo Vallecano; Attendance: 480; Referee: Jana Adámková (Czech Republic)

9 November 2011 Second leg	Arsenal (England)	5–1	(Spain) Rayo Vallecano	Borehamwood
15:00 GMT (UTC+0)	Ludlow 16'; K. Little 55'; Yankey 62'; Nobbs (yellow card) 64' (goal) 71'; Carter 74'	Report	Natalia 72' (yellow card) 76'; Burgos (yellow card) 53'	Stadium: Meadow Park; Attendance: 323; Referee: Efthalia Mitsi (Greece)

===== Quarter-finals =====
14 March 2012 First leg	Arsenal (England)	3–1	(Sweden) Göteborg	Borehamwood
15:30 GMT (UTC+0)	Nobbs 25'; K. Little 75' (pen.); White 82'	Report	Ek 10'; Sjoberg (yellow card) 85'	Stadium: Meadow Park; Attendance: 447; Referee: Teodora Albon (Romania)

21 March 2012 Second leg	Göteborg (Sweden)	1–0	(England) Arsenal	Gothenburg
19:00 GMT (UTC+0)	Hammarstrom (yellow card) 79'; Segerstrom (yellow card) 85'; Törnqvist 90'	Report		Stadium: Valhalla IP; Attendance: 2,150; Referee: Bibiana Steinhaus (Germany)

===== Semi-finals =====
15 April 2012 First leg	Arsenal (England)	1–2	(Germany) Frankfurt	Borehamwood
16:00 BST	Ludlow (yellow card) 21'; Chapman (yellow card) 44'; Grant 69'	Report	Marozsan (yellow card) 56'; Crnogorčević 64'; Garefrekes 90+3'	Stadium: Meadow Park; Attendance: 894; Referee: Silvia Tea Spinelli (Italy)

21 April 2012 Second leg	Frankfurt (Germany)	2–0	(England) Arsenal	Frankfurt
14:15 BST	Marozsán 60'; Landström 85'	Report	Chapman (yellow card) 14'	Stadium: Stadion am Brentanobad; Attendance: 3,710; Referee: Kirsi Heikkinen (Finland)

== See also ==
- List of Arsenal W.F.C. seasons
- 2011–12 in English football
- 2012–13 in English football
