= 2012 FA WSL Cup final =

- Event: 2012 FA WSL Cup
Arsenal	Birmingham City
1	0
- Date: 10 October 2012
- Venue: Underhill Stadium, London
- Referee: Robert Massey-Ellis
- Attendance: 2,535

The 2012 FA WSL Cup final was the second final of the FA WSL Cup, England's secondary cup competition for women's football teams and its primary league cup tournament. Arsenal beat Birmingham 1-0.

== Match ==
=== Details ===
10 October 2012
19:00 BST

Arsenal	1–0	Birmingham City
Little 82'	Report

Underhill Stadium, Barnet
Attendance: 2,535
Referee: Robert Massey-Ellis

Arsenal	Birmingham City

GK	1	(Republic of Ireland) Emma Byrne
LB	19	(Republic of Ireland) Niamh Fahey
LCB	7	(Republic of Ireland) Ciara Grant
RCB	5	(England) Gilly Flaherty
RB	22	(England) Alex Scott
LCM	16	(Scotland) Kim Little
CDM	17	(England) Katie Chapman (c)
RCM	2	(England) Steph Houghton	(yellow card) 70'
LW	11	(England) Rachel Yankey		(substituted off) 90'
FW	23	(England) Kelly Smith		(substituted off) 78'
RW	9	(England) Ellen White		(substituted off) 64'
Substitutes:
GK	31	(England) Sophie Harris
DF	3	(Republic of Ireland) Yvonne Tracy
MF	4	(Wales) Jayne Ludlow
MF	30	(England) Bianca Bragg
FW	15	(England) Danielle Carter		(substituted on) 90'
FW	14	(Scotland) Jen Beattie		(substituted on) 78'
FW	12	(England) Gemma Davison		(substituted on) 64'
Manager:
(England) Laura Harvey

GK	22	(Jamaica) Becky Spencer
LB	17	(England) Rachel Unitt	(substituted off) 65'
LCB	6	(England) Laura Bassett (c)
RCB	3	(England) Kerys Harrop
RB	2	(England) Chelsea Weston
LW	11	(England) Jo Potter
LCM	13	(England) Jade Moore
RCM	19	(England) Emily Westwood
RW	10	(England) Karen Carney
FW	9	(England) Eni Aluko
FW	8	(England) Rachel Williams
Substitutes:
GK	1	(Republic of Ireland) Marie Hourihan
DF		(England) Anna Wilcox
MF	16	(England) Hannah George
MF	17	(England) Izzy Christiansen	(substituted on) 65'
MF	4	(England) Emily Simpkins
FW	5	(Spain) Christina Torkildsen
FW	20	(England) Marie Ballard
Manager:
(England) David Parker

Player of the match
Kim Little (Arsenal)

Assistant referees:

Fourth official:

Match rules

- 90 minutes.
- 30 minutes of extra-time if necessary.
- Penalty shoot-out if scores still level.
- Seven named substitutes.
- Maximum of three substitutions.
