= 2012 FA WSL Cup =

Tournament details
- Country: England
- Dates: 18 March 2012 – 10 October 2012
- Teams: 8

Final positions
- Champions: Arsenal
- Runners-up: Birmingham City

Tournament statistics
- Matches played: 15
- Goals scored: 43 (2.87 per match)
- Attendance: 5,758 (384 per match)
- Top goal scorer(s): (Scotland) Kim Little Arsenal (England) Jodie Taylor Birmingham City (4 Goals Each)

The 2012 FA WSL Cup was the second edition of the FA WSL's league cup competition. It was sponsored by Continental AG, who sponsored the competition from its creation, and was officially known as the FA WSL Continental Tyres Cup. All eight teams of the WSL took part.

Arsenal were the defending champions from the inaugural season.

To allow for more games, the format was changed from a straight knock-out to a group stage format with the top two in each group advancing to the semi-finals. Arsenal defended their title with a 1–0 win over Birmingham City in a rematch of the previous final. They thus won a double of league championship and League Cup, missing out on the Women's FA Cup.

== Group Stage ==
=== Group 1 ===
| Pos | Team | Pld | W | D | L | GF | GA | GD | Pts | Qualification | BRI | BIR | EVE | DON |
|---|---|---|---|---|---|---|---|---|---|---|---|---|---|---|
| 1 | Bristol Academy | 3 | 2 | 1 | 0 | 6 | 1 | +5 | 7 | Advance to knock-out stage | — | 1–1 | — | — |
| 2 | Birmingham City | 3 | 2 | 1 | 0 | 4 | 1 | +3 | 7 | Advance to knock-out stage | — | — | 1–0 | 2–0 |
| 3 | Everton | 3 | 1 | 0 | 2 | 1 | 5 | −4 | 3 | | 0–4 | — | — | 1–0 |
| 4 | Doncaster Rovers Belles | 3 | 0 | 0 | 3 | 0 | 4 | −4 | 0 | | 0–1 | — | — | — |

18 March 2012

| Birmingham City | 1–0 | Everton |
|---|---|---|
| Taylor 88' (pen.) | Report |

The DCS Stadium, Stratford-upon-Avon
Attendance: 208
Referee: Ian Rathbone
18 March 2012

| Doncaster Rovers Belles | 0–1 | Bristol Academy |
|---|---|---|
| | Report | Watts 74' |

Keepmoat Stadium, Doncaster

12 May 2012

| Bristol Academy | 1–1 | Birmingham City |
|---|---|---|
| Yorston 42' | Report | Moore 73' |

Stoke Gifford Stadium, Filton
Attendance: 287
Referee: Lee Sheridan
13 May 2012

| Everton | 1–0 | Doncaster Rovers Belles |
|---|---|---|
| Hinnigan 72' | Report |

Rossett Park, Crosby
Attendance: 277
Referee: Natalie Walker

10 June 2012

| Everton | 0–4 | Bristol Academy |
|---|---|---|
| | Report | James 36'; Fishlock 73' (pen.); Harding 83'; Heatherson 90' |

Rossett Park, Crosby
Attendance: 340
Referee: Mark Duncan
10 June 2012

| Birmingham City | 2–0 | Doncaster Rovers Belles |
|---|---|---|
| Aluko 31'; Taylor 71' | Report |

The DCS Stadium, Stratford-upon-Avon
Attendance: 464
Referee: Sasa Ihringova

=== Group 2 ===
| Pos | Team | Pld | W | D | L | GF | GA | GD | Pts | Qualification | LIN | ARS | CHE | LIV |
|---|---|---|---|---|---|---|---|---|---|---|---|---|---|---|
| 1 | Lincoln | 3 | 3 | 0 | 0 | 9 | 6 | +3 | 9 | Advance to knock-out stage | — | 4–3 | — | 3–2 |
| 2 | Arsenal | 3 | 2 | 0 | 1 | 9 | 4 | +5 | 6 | Advance to knock-out stage | — | — | 3–0 | — |
| 3 | Chelsea | 3 | 1 | 0 | 2 | 3 | 6 | −3 | 3 | | 1–2 | — | — | 2–1 |
| 4 | Liverpool | 3 | 0 | 0 | 3 | 3 | 8 | −5 | 0 | | — | 0–3 | — | — |

18 March 2012
14:00

| Chelsea | 1–2 | Lincoln |
|---|---|---|
| Bleazard 57' | Report | Hamilton 49'; Staniforth 67' |

Wheatsheaf Park, Staines
Attendance: 132
18 March 2012
14:00

| Liverpool | 0–3 | Arsenal |
|---|---|---|
| | Report | Beattie 16'; Houghton 25'; White 68' |

Skelmersdale & Ormskirk College Stadium, Skelmersdale

13 May 2012
14:00

| Chelsea | 2–1 | Liverpool |
|---|---|---|
| Ward 1'; Susi 49' | Report | Gielnik 61' |

Wheatsheaf Park, Staines
Attendance: 157
13 May 2012
14:00

| Lincoln | 4–3 | Arsenal |
|---|---|---|
| Sargeant 21'; Tracy 30' (o.g.); Allen 71' (pen.); Harris 90' | Report | Little 6', 66'; Houghton 36' |

Ashby Avenue, Lincoln

9 June 2012
14:00

| Lincoln | 3–2 | Liverpool |
|---|---|---|
| Cantrell 25'; Harris 34'; Stoney 85' | Report | Bradley-Auckland 17' (o.g.); Keryakoplis 33' |

Ashby Avenue, Lincoln
Attendance: 154
Referee: Martin Dexter
10 June 2012
14:00

| Arsenal | 3–0 | Chelsea |
|---|---|---|
| Nobbs 22'; Little 58' (pen.); Beattie 81' | Report |

Meadow Park, Borehamwood
Attendance: 634
Referee: Ashvin Degnarain

== Knockout stage ==
=== Bracket ===
Semi-finals
3 September – Filton
Bristol Academy | 0
Arsenal | 4
2 September – Lincoln
Lincoln | 1
Birmingham City | 2

Final
10 October – Barnet
Arsenal | 1
Birmingham City | 0

=== Semi-finals ===
| Team 1 | Score | Team 2 |
|---|---|---|
| Lincoln | 1–2 | Birmingham City |
| Bristol Academy | 0–4 | Arsenal |

2 September 2012

| Lincoln | 1–2 | Birmingham City |
|---|---|---|
| Alleway 88' | Report | Taylor 45', 75' |

Ashby Avenue, Lincoln
Referee: Stephen Ross
3 September 2012

| Bristol Academy | 0–4 | Arsenal |
|---|---|---|
| | Report; Report | Davison 39'; Smith 70'; Yankey 73'; Beattie |

Stoke Gifford Stadium, Filton
Attendance: 570
Referee: Adam Bromley

=== Final ===
10 October 2012

| Arsenal | 1–0 | Birmingham City |
|---|---|---|
| Little 82' | Report |

Underhill Stadium, Barnet
Attendance: 2,535
Referee: Robert Massey-Ellis

== See also ==
- 2012 FA WSL
