= Steph Houghton =

English footballer (born 1988)

Steph Houghton MBE
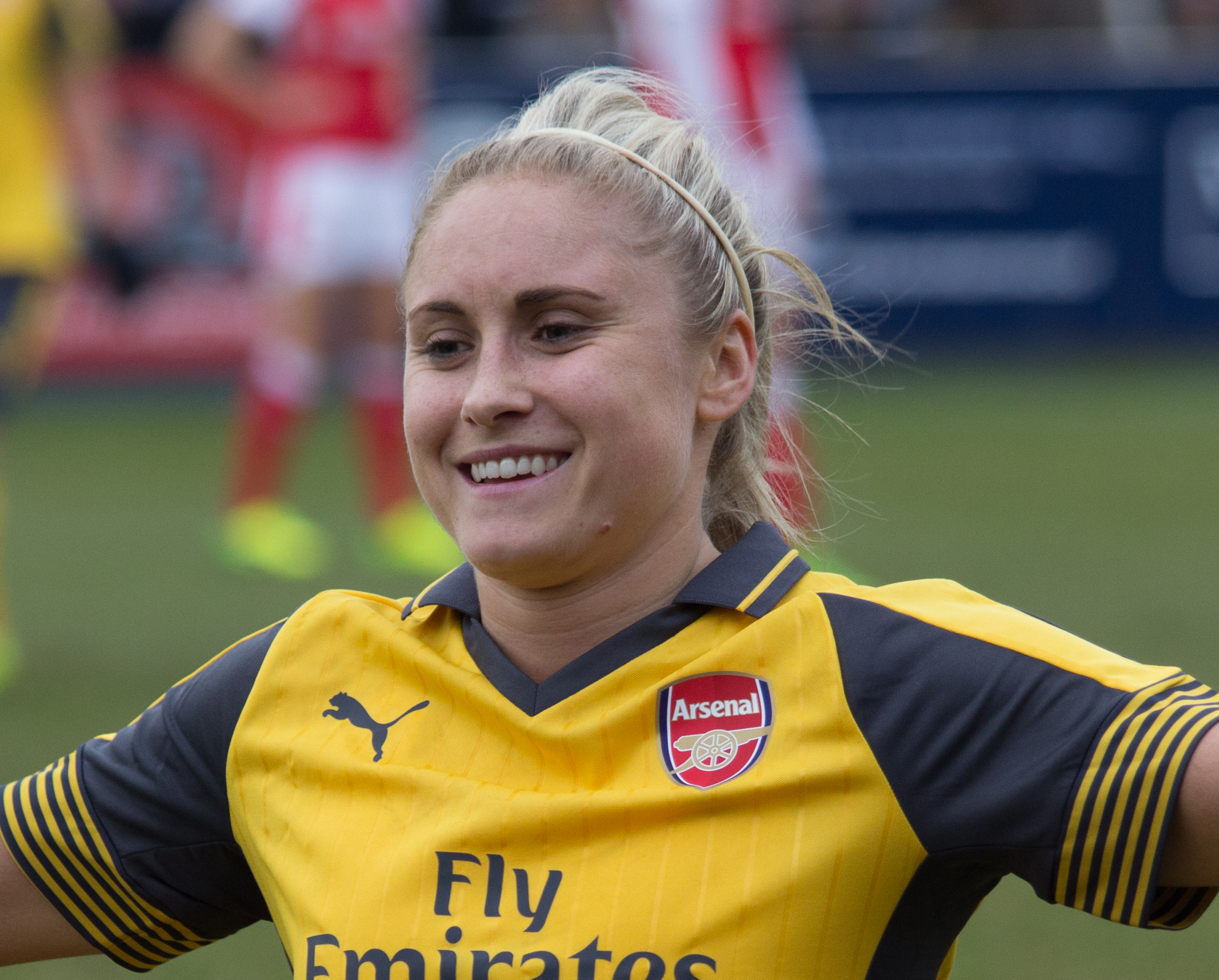
- Houghton in 2017

Personal information
- Full name: Stephanie Jayne Darby
- Birth name: Stephanie Jayne Houghton
- Date of birth: 23 April 1988 (age 38)
- Place of birth: Durham, England
- Height: 5 ft 9 in (1.74 m)
- Position: Centre-back

Youth career
- Sunderland

Senior career*
Years	Team	Apps	(Gls)
2002–2007	Sunderland	61	(24)
2007–2010	Leeds Carnegie	47	(9)
2010–2013	Arsenal	39	(7)
2014–2024	Manchester City	138	(17)
Total		285	(57)

International career
2008	England U19	4	(0)
2010	England U23	3	(0)
2007–2021	England	121	(13)
2012–2021	Great Britain	8	(3)
Medal record
Women's football
Representing England
FIFA Women's World Cup
Bronze medal – third place	2015 Canada
- * Club domestic league appearances and goals

Stephanie Jayne Darby MBE (née Houghton, /ˈhoʊtən/, born 23 April 1988), commonly known as Steph Houghton, is an English former professional footballer who played as a centre-back. Known for her leadership and commitment, Houghton was widely regarded as one of the best centre-backs in the world during her career.

At club level, Houghton started at Sunderland in her native North East England, before moving on to Leeds Carnegie in 2007, where she won the FA Women's Premier League Cup. In 2010, she joined Arsenal, where she won the FA WSL on two occasions and is a two-time winner of the FA Women's Cup and three-time winner of the FA WSL Cup. She broke into the Sunderland team as a striker before moving back into midfield and later into defence.

Since her debut in 2007, Houghton has played over 100 times for England women's national team. She suffered serious injuries immediately before the 2007 World Cup and Euro 2009, but recovered to play in the 2011 World Cup and Euro 2013. She was made England captain in January 2014, and went on to captain her country at two World Cups and a Women's Euro, earning a bronze medal at the 2015 World Cup. At the 2012 Summer Olympics, Houghton scored three goals in Great Britain's four games, including winners against New Zealand and Brazil. She represented Great Britain again in the 2020 Summer Olympics.

Houghton was appointed Member of the Order of the British Empire (MBE) in the 2016 New Year Honours for services to football. She was awarded the Freedom of the City of Sunderland on 8 March 2023.

== Club career ==
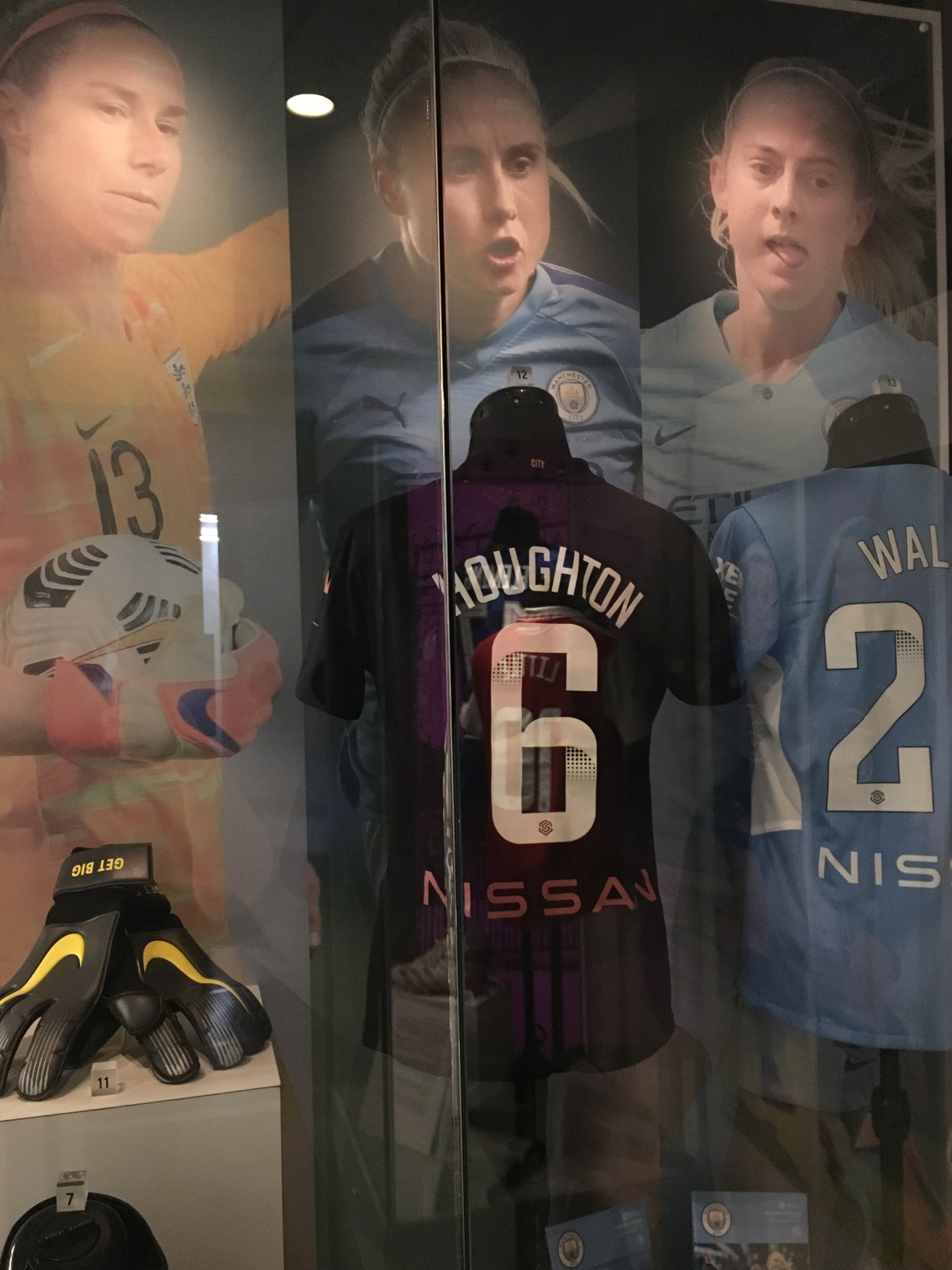
One of Houghton's Manchester City shirts; she captained the club from its professional inauguration until her retirement

Houghton began her career playing for five years at Sunderland. She helped Sunderland to win promotion from the Northern Division in the 2005–06 season and then won the FA Young Player of the Year Award in the 2006–07 season. After Sunderland were relegated that season, Houghton became a target for Arsenal and Everton. She eventually joined Leeds Carnegie. After helping Leeds win the 2010 FA Women's Premier League Cup, Houghton signed for Arsenal in August of that year.

On 5 December 2013, it was announced that Houghton had signed an agreement to leave Arsenal for new WSL side Manchester City on 1 January 2014. Houghton signed a two-year contract extension with City on 24 January 2020.

On 27 March 2024, Houghton announced that she would retire from football at the end of the 2023–24 season. She played her final game on 18 May, coming on for Alex Greenwood and taking the captain's armband in the 66th minute of a 2–1 away league win over Aston Villa.

== International career ==
=== England ===
External video
- England Football
- Steph Houghton's Journey: From Backyard Football to England Captain

Houghton was involved with England at U16 schools, U19, U20, U21 and U23 level. She was called into the full squad for a match against Germany on 25 October 2006, when Katie Chapman withdrew with an illness. She was an unused substitute in the 5–1 defeat in Aalen. She made her debut in the next match, replacing Emily Westwood after 73 minutes of a 6–0 win over Russia in Milton Keynes on 8 March 2007. Her first start came three days later, in a 1–0 win over Scotland at Adams Park. She missed the 2007 World Cup with a broken leg and Euro 2009 with a damaged cruciate ligament.

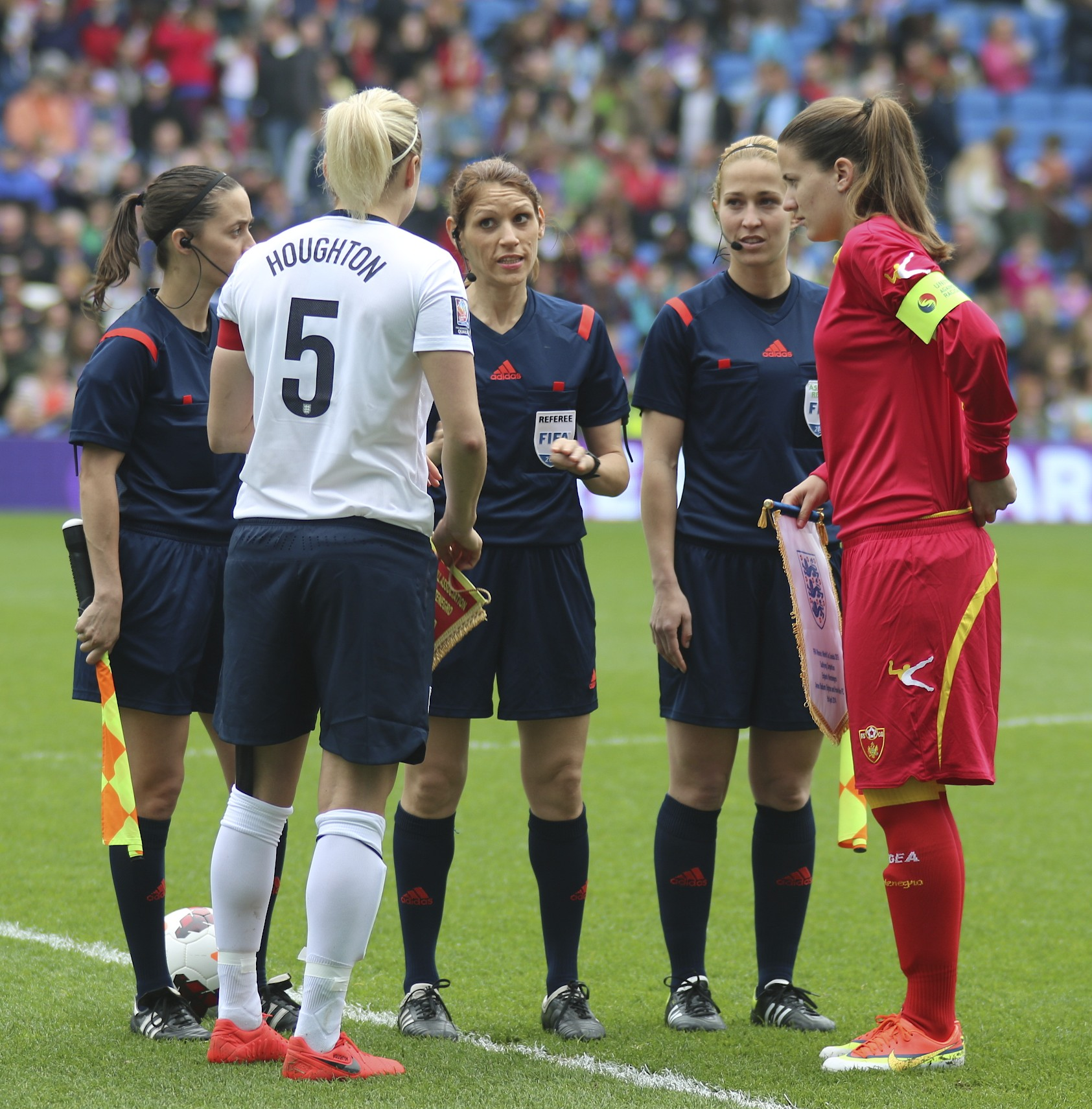
Houghton captaining England against Montenegro in April 2014

In May 2009, Houghton was one of the first 17 female players to be given central contracts by The Football Association. She played in all three games at UEFA Women's Euro 2013 as England finished in last place; she described the result as "a massive disappointment personally and collectively as a squad." In January 2014, she was named the new captain for England's team under coach Mark Sampson, beginning on a 1–1 draw with Norway.

For the 2015 World Cup in Canada, Houghton was again named England's team captain. Houghton scored her first World Cup goal against Norway in the round of 16, and was chosen Player of the Match during the quarterfinals with Canada, which qualified England for their first semi-finals ever.

Houghton earned her 100th England cap on 11 November 2018 against Sweden at New York Stadium in Rotherham, South Yorkshire. In May 2019, it was announced that Houghton had been selected for the 2019 FIFA Women's World Cup in France. She scored a goal in the Round of 16 match against Cameroon.

Houghton was allotted 164 when the FA announced their legacy numbers scheme to honour the 50th anniversary of England's inaugural international.

=== Great Britain ===
Houghton was called up to the first Great Britain women's side for the 2012 Summer Olympics as a defender. She became the team's record goalscorer from the left–back position, scoring in all three group games to help Great Britain to win the group with a 100% record, as well as making important challenges to help ensure the side progressed without conceding a goal. Houghton was also named left back of the tournament due to her outstanding performance during the games.

She represented Great Britain again at the 2020 Summer Olympics, featuring three times during the tournament.

== In popular culture ==
In October 2014, Houghton was the first female player to appear on the cover of Shoot magazine. In the summer of 2024, she joined BBC Sport as an analyst for the new football season appearing on 5Live and Football Focus.

== Personal life ==
Houghton is from South Hetton, a former mining town in County Durham. She is a lifelong fan of Sunderland.

She is married to former Bradford City defender Stephen Darby. They married on 21 June 2018. On 18 September 2018, Darby announced his retirement from professional football at the age of 29 after being diagnosed with motor neurone disease. She was recognised as one of the BBC's 100 women of 2017.

In March 2023, while receiving the Freedom of the City of Sunderland; at the ceremony, the Sunderland Echo asked her about the pronunciation of her name and subsequently reported that it "has irritated [her] for years", as she pronounces it "hoe-ton".

== Career statistics ==
=== Club ===
As of match played 18 May 2024

Appearances and goals by club, season and competition
Club	Season	League			FA Cup		League Cup		Continental		Total	
Club	Season	Division	Apps	Goals	Apps	Goals	Apps	Goals	Apps	Goals	Apps	Goals
Sunderland	2004–05	FA WPL Northern	22	16			0	0	—		22	16
Sunderland	2005–06	Women's Premier League	16	1			3	0	—		19	1
Sunderland	2006–07	Women's Premier League	23	7			1	0	—		24	7
Sunderland	Total		61	24			4	0	—		65	24
Leeds Carnegie	2007–08	Women's Premier League	14	2			0	0	—		14	2
Leeds Carnegie	2008–09	Women's Premier League	18	5			2	0	—		20	5
Leeds Carnegie	2009–10	Women's Premier League	15	2			0	0	—		15	2
Leeds Carnegie	Total		47	9			2	0	—		49	9
Arsenal	2011	Women's Super League	12	1	4	0	3	1	4	0	23	2
Arsenal	2012	Women's Super League	14	1	2	0	5	2	4	0	25	3
Arsenal	2013	Women's Super League	13	5	4	1	5	1	4	0	26	7
Arsenal	Total		39	7	10	1	13	4	12	0	74	12
Manchester City	2014	Women's Super League	13	0	2	0	7	1	—		22	1
Manchester City	2015	Women's Super League	11	3	1	0	6	1	—		18	4
Manchester City	2016	Women's Super League	16	2	3	0	4	0	2	0	25	2
Manchester City	2017	Women's Super League	8	0	4	1	0	0	3	0	15	1
Manchester City	2017–18	Women's Super League	15	2	1	0	7	0	8	1	31	3
Manchester City	2018–19	Women's Super League	20	3	2	1	6	0	1	0	29	4
Manchester City	2019–20	Women's Super League	16	2	2	0	6	0	4	0	28	2
Manchester City	2020–21	Women's Super League	16	2	1	0	3	0	3	0	23	2
Manchester City	2021–22	Women's Super League	5	1	0	0	2	0	2	0	9	1
Manchester City	2022–23	Women's Super League	14	2	2	0	6	0	2	0	24	2
Manchester City	2023–24	Women's Super League	4	0	1	0	4	0	—		9	0
Manchester City	Total		138	17	19	2	51	2	25	1	233	22
Career total			285	57	29	3	70	6	37	1	421	67

=== International ===
Statistics accurate as of match played 27 July 2021.

Year	England		Great Britain	
Year	Apps	Goals	Apps	Goals
2007	?	0	–	
2008	?	0	–	
2009	?	1	–	
2010	?	0	–	
2011	?	1	–	
2012	?	3	5	3
2013	10	1	–	
2014	11	1	–	
2015	14	1	–	
2016	12	1	–	
2017	15	2	–	
2018	6	0	–	
2019	17	2	–	
2020	3	0	–	
2021	1	0	3	0
Total	121	13	8	3

For England

Scores and results list England's goal tally first.

Goal	Date	Venue	Opponent	Score	Result	Competition
1.	5 March 2009	GSZ Stadium, Larnaca, Cyprus	South Africa	4–0	6–0	2009 Cyprus Cup
2.	22 September 2011	County Ground, Swindon, England	Slovenia	3–0	4–0	Euro 2013 qualifying
3.	31 March 2012	Sajmište, Vrbovec, Croatia	Croatia	5–0	6–0	Euro 2013 qualifying
4.	31 March 2012	Sajmište, Vrbovec, Croatia	Croatia	6–0	6–0	Euro 2013 qualifying
5.	20 October 2012	Stade Sébastien Charléty, Paris, France	France	1–0	2–2	Friendly
6.	6 March 2013	GSP Stadium, Nicosia, Cyprus	Italy	2–2	4–2	2013 Cyprus Cup
7.	14 June 2014	Traktar Stadium, Minsk, Belarus	Belarus	2–0	3–0	2015 World Cup qualifying
8.	22 June 2015	Lansdowne Stadium, Ottawa, Canada	Norway	1–1	2–1	2015 World Cup
9.	25 October 2016	Estadio Pedro Escartín, Guadalajara, Spain	Spain	2–0	2–1	Friendly
10.	24 November 2017	Bescot Stadium, Walsall, England	Bosnia and Herzegovina	1–0	4–0	2019 World Cup qualifying
11.	24 November 2017	Bescot Stadium, Walsall, England	Bosnia and Herzegovina	3–0	4–0	2019 World Cup qualifying
12.	2 March 2019	Nissan Stadium, Nashville, United States	United States	1–1	2–2	2019 SheBelieves Cup
13.	23 June 2019	Stade du Hainaut, Valenciennes, France	Cameroon	1–0	3–0	2019 World Cup

For Great Britain
Scores and results list Great Britain's goal tally first.

#	Date	Venue	Opponent	Result	Competition
1	25 July 2012	Millennium Stadium, Cardiff, Wales	New Zealand	1–0	2012 Summer Olympics
2	28 July 2012	Millennium Stadium, Cardiff, Wales	Cameroon	3–0	2012 Summer Olympics
3	31 July 2012	Wembley Stadium, London, England	Brazil	1–0	2012 Summer Olympics

== Honours ==
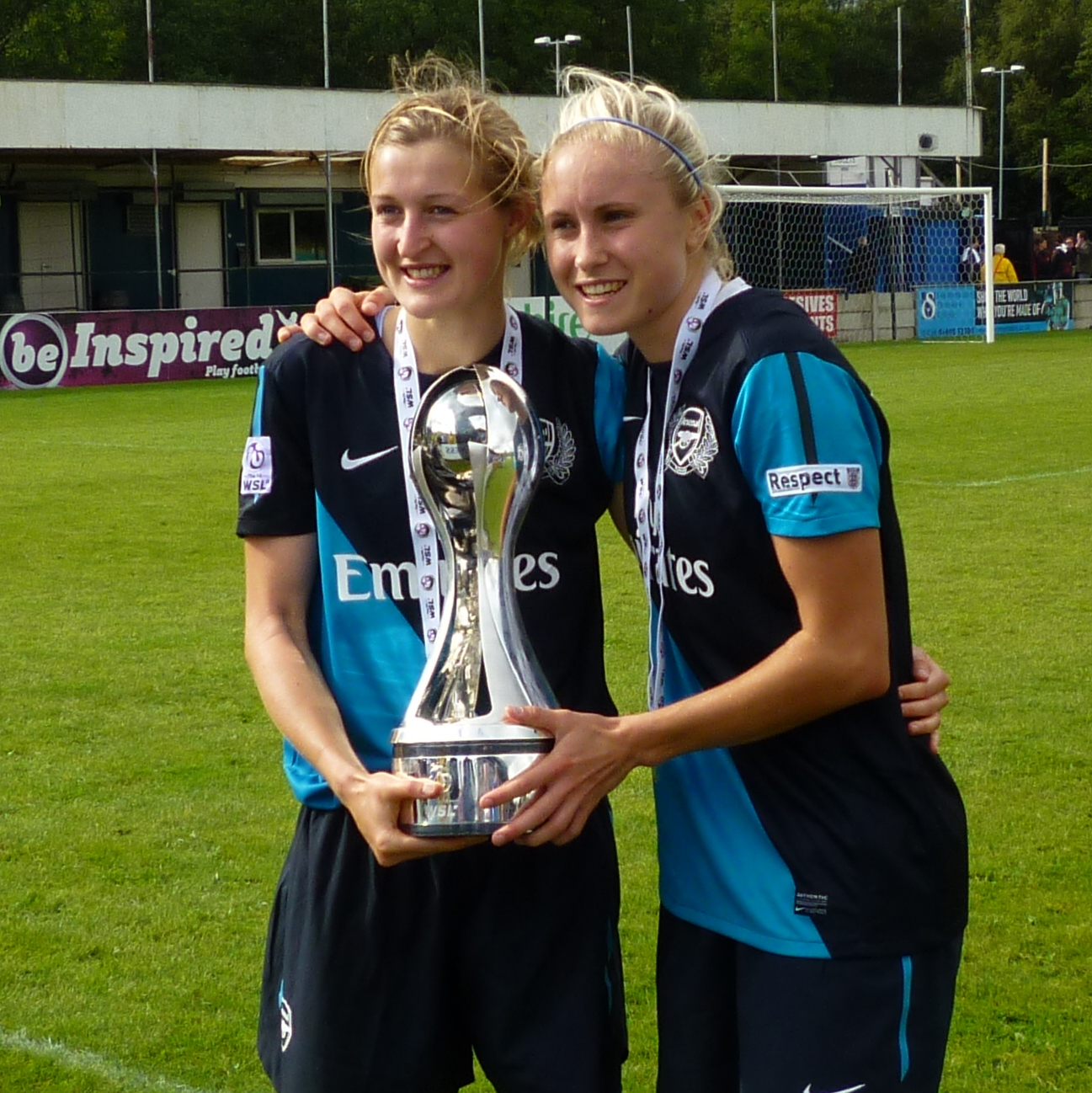
Houghton (right) with Ellen White and the FA WSL trophy

Leeds Carnegie

- FA Women's Premier League Cup: 2009–10

Arsenal

- FA WSL: 2011, 2012
- FA Women's Cup: 2010–11, 2012–13
- FA WSL Cup: 2011, 2012, 2013

Manchester City

- FA WSL: 2016
- FA Women's Cup: 2016–17, 2018–19, 2019–20; runner-up: 2021–22
- FA WSL Cup: 2014, 2016, 2018–19, 2021–22; runner-up: 2017–18
- Women's FA Community Shield runner-up: 2020

England

- FIFA Women's World Cup third place: 2015
- Cyprus Women's Cup: 2009, 2013, 2015; runner-up: 2014
- SheBelieves Cup: 2019

Individual

- England Women's Player of the Year: 2014
- English Football Hall of Fame: 2024
- Women's Super League Hall of Fame: 2024

== See also ==
- List of women's footballers with 100 or more caps
