= Sophie Harris (footballer) =

English association football player

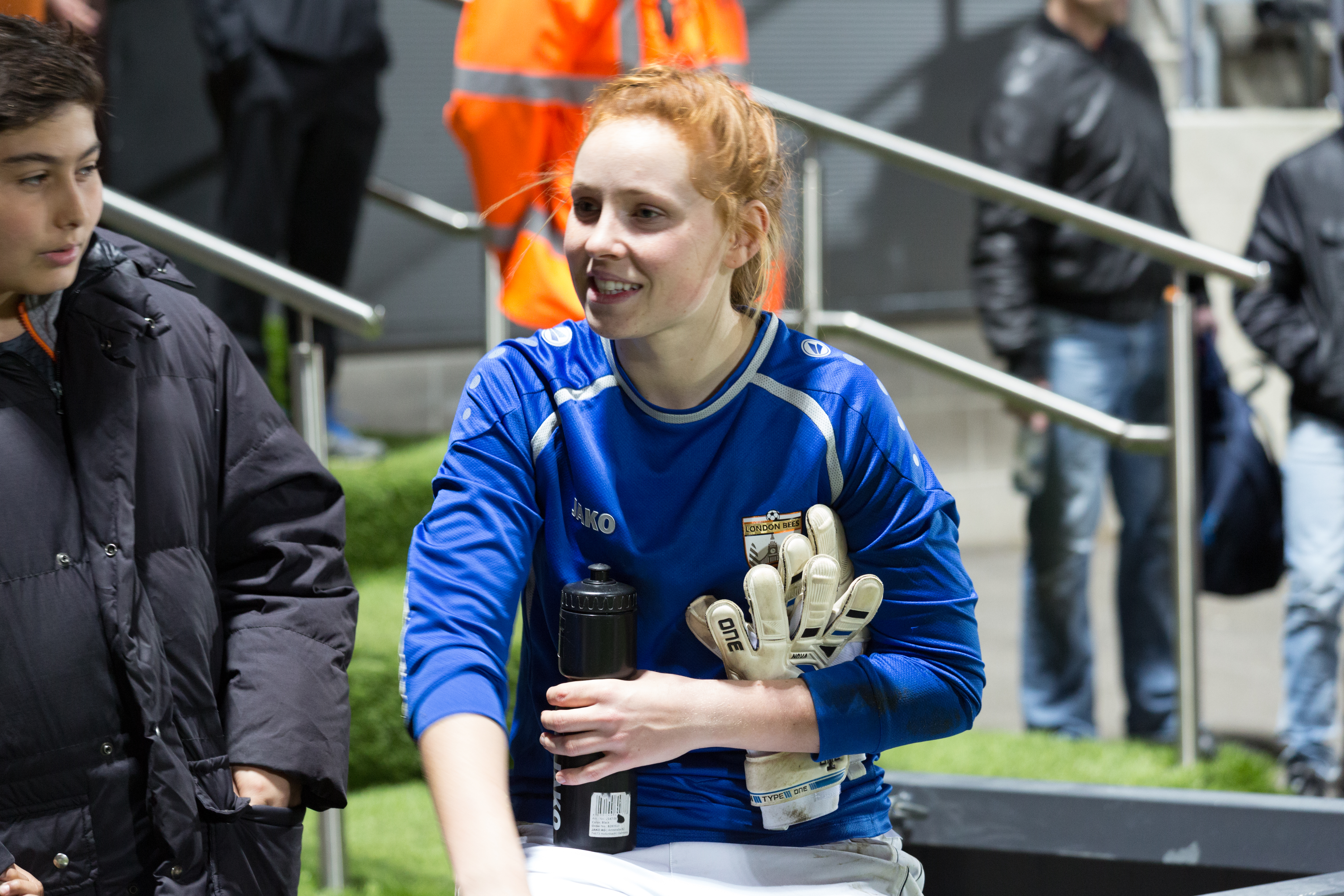
- Playing for London Bees in April 2017

Personal information
- Full name: Sophie Harris
- Date of birth: 25 August 1994 (age 32)
- Place of birth: Lincoln, England
- Position: Goalkeeper

Youth career
- Lincoln City
- 2010–2012: Arsenal

Senior career*
Years	Team	Apps	(Gls)
2012–2013	Arsenal	1	(0)
2013	→ Nottingham Forest (loan)		
2014–2018	London Bees	48	(0)
2018–2020	Brighton & Hove Albion	5	(0)
2020	→ Lewes (loan)	1	(0)
2020–2021	Watford		
2021–2022	Leicester City	1	(0)
2022–2023	Southampton	0	(0)
2023–	Watford	3	(0)
- * Club domestic league appearances and goals as of 14 September 2025

Sophie Harris (born 25 August 1994) is an English football goalkeeper.

Harris is from North Hykeham in Lincoln, England. She began playing for Lincoln City's centre of excellence. In 2010 she was called into England women's national under-17 football team and moved to London to join Arsenal's academy.

Harris progressed into Arsenal's first team squad, but her development was temporarily derailed by a shoulder injury and the untimely death of her mother. She moved to Nottingham Forest on loan and then signed for London Bees ahead of the 2014 FA WSL season. In July 2018, Harris transferred to top tier Brighton & Hove Albion, whose coach Hope Powell said: "She already has some good experience at a relatively young age, and I am very much looking forward to working with her this season."

When Marie Hourihan was injured in a defeat by Manchester City in February 2019, Harris came on as a substitute to make her league debut. Harris was subsequently named the Professional Footballers' Association (PFA) Fans' Player of the Month for February 2019. In 2019–20 Harris made six appearances for Brighton, including a "clean sheet" in a Continental Cup win over Arsenal. The signing of Cecilie Fiskerstrand in January reduced Harris's first team opportunities.

In January 2020 Harris joined Brighton's neighbours Lewes on loan until the end of the 2019–20 FA Women's Championship season. The season was truncated by the COVID-19 pandemic in the United Kingdom, and Harris joined FA Women's National League South club Watford in July 2020. After seven appearances for Watford Harris transferred to FA Women's Championship leaders Leicester City in January 2021. In July 2022 Sophie joined newly promoted Southampton FC.

== Honours ==
Arsenal

- WSL Cup: 2012

Individual

- WSL Player of the Month: February 2019
