= Marie Hourihan =

Irish footballer

Personal information
- Full name: Marie Hourihan
- Date of birth: 10 March 1989 (age 37)
- Place of birth: Harrow, London, England
- Height: 1.87 m (6 ft 2 in)
- Position: Goalkeeper

Senior career*
Years	Team	Apps	(Gls)
2004–2006	Watford		
2006–2007	Fulham		
2007–2009	Watford		
2009	Spartans		
2010	Doncaster Rovers Belles		(1)
2010–2011	Leicester City	2	(0)
2010–2013	Birmingham City	23	(0)
2013–2015	Chelsea	16	(0)
2016–2018	Manchester City	12	(0)
2018	→ Brighton & Hove Albion (loan)	4	(0)
2018–2019	Brighton & Hove Albion	14	(0)
2019–2021	Braga	20	(0)
2021–2022	Birmingham City	7	(0)

International career
2008–2010	England U23		
2017–2021	Republic of Ireland	24	(0)

Managerial career
- 2022–2023: London Bees
- 2023–2025: Stoke City
- 2025–2026: Plymouth Argyle
- * Club domestic league appearances and goals as of 20:15, 03 July 2019 (UTC)

Marie Hourihan (born 10 March 1989) is an Irish former footballer and current head coach. She recently managed Plymouth Argyle and previously played for clubs including Brighton & Hove Albion, Chelsea, and Manchester City She represented the Republic of Ireland at senior international level, having represented England up to under-23 level.

== Club career ==
=== Birmingham City, 2011–2013 ===
Hourihan's debut for Birmingham City was a 4–0 shutout win against Bristol City on 14 April 2011. She made 11 appearances for the club during the 2011 FA WSL season helping the team finish in second place with a 8–1–5 record.

During the 2012 FA WSL season, she made seven appearances to help the team finish in second place with a 7–2–5 record.

=== Chelsea, 2013–2015 ===
In July 2013, Hourihan signed with Chelsea L.F.C. for the 2013 FA WSL season.

=== Manchester City, 2016–2018 ===
In December 2015, Hourihan signed with Manchester City for the 2016 FA WSL season.

=== Brighton, 2018–2019 ===
Hourihan joined Brighton & Hove Albion W.F.C. in January 2018, on a loan deal until the end of the season. The move was made permanent in the summer of 2018.

=== Braga, 2019–2021 ===
In July 2019 Hourihan signed for Portuguese Campeonato Nacional de Futebol Feminino champions Braga.

== International career ==
After previously representing the England women's national under-23 football team, Hourihan accepted a call-up from the new Republic of Ireland women's national football team coach Colin Bell in 2017. She was eligible to represent the Girls in Green thanks to her late grandmother who moved back from London to her native Arigna, County Roscommon. She made her senior debut in March 2017, in a 0–0 draw with Hungary at the 2017 Cyprus Cup. Hourihan was installed as the successor to Ireland's longstanding goalkeeper Emma Byrne.

== Managerial career ==
On 24 July 2023, Hourihan was appointed head coach of Stoke City Women, the team's first full-time manager. In the 24–25 season Marie led Stoke City Women to their highest ever league finish in the FA Women's National League and her side earn't their place in the FAWNL Cup final against Nottingham Forest Women and lost 3–1. She left Stoke in May 2025 and joined Plymouth Argyle Women as Head Coach in June 2025.

== Personal life ==
Hourihan is a second cousin of the footballer Conor Hourihane.

== Honours ==
Birmingham City

- Women's FA Cup: 2011–12

Chelsea

- FA WSL 1 Winner: 2015
- Women's FA Cup: 2014–15
- FA WSL 1 Runner-up: 2012, 2014

Manchester City

- FA WSL 1 Winner 2016
- FA WSL Cup: 2016
- Women's FA Cup: 2016–17
