= Marlene Sjöberg =

Swedish footballer

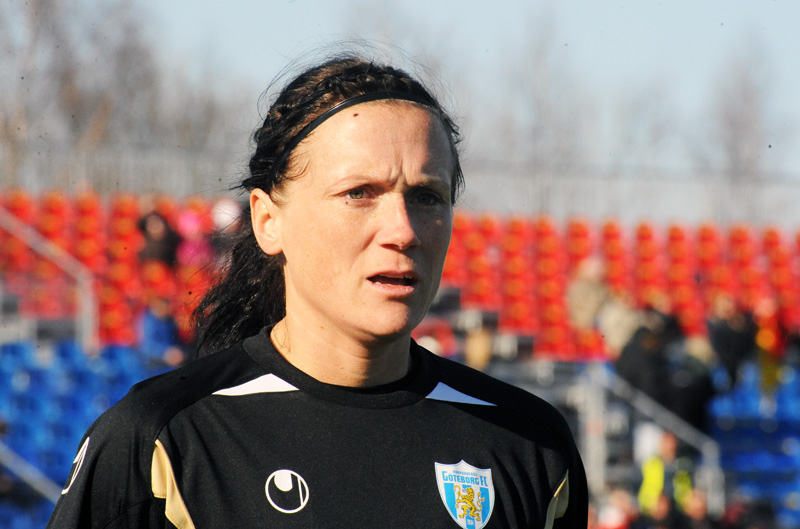
- Playing for Göteborg in April 2013

Personal information
- Full name: Marlene Sjöberg
- Date of birth: 15 January 1981 (age 45)
- Place of birth: Curitiba, Brazil
- Height: 1.60 m (5 ft 3 in)
- Position: Defender

Youth career
- 1987–1997: Lerums IS

Senior career*
Years	Team	Apps	(Gls)
1998–1999	Jitex		
2000–2001	Göteborg	28	(0)
2002	Umeå	4	(0)
2003–2015	Göteborg	218	(21)

International career^{‡}
2006–2007	Sweden	5	(0)
- * Club domestic league appearances and goals as of 18:50, 18 August 2013 (UTC) ‡ National team caps and goals as of 18:50, 18 August 2013 (UTC)

Marlene Sjöberg (born 15 January 1981) is a Swedish football former defender who last played for Göteborg FC of the Damallsvenskan. She also played for Jitex BK and Umeå IK. Sjöberg also played in the Champions League with Umeå and Göteborg.

She was a member of the Swedish national team, and made her debut in a 3–2 defeat to the United States in July 2006.
