= Sophie Bradley-Auckland =

English footballer (born 1989)

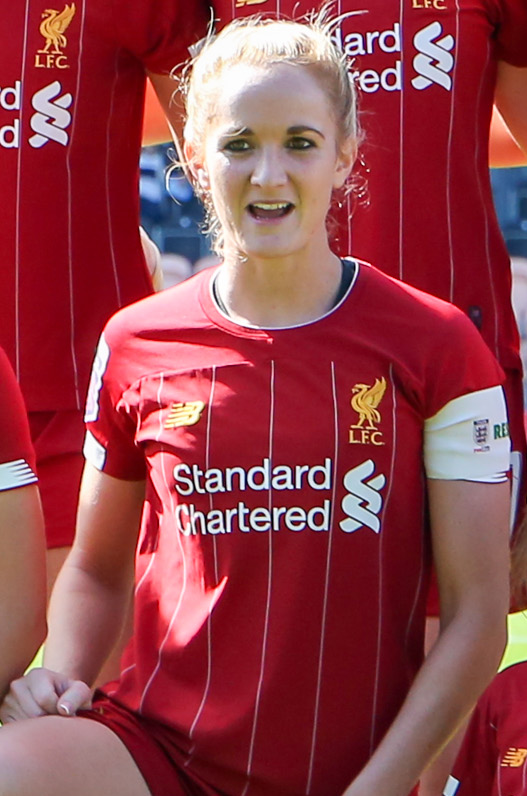
- Bradley-Auckland in September 2019

Personal information
- Full name: Sophie Elizabeth Bradley-Auckland
- Birth name: Sophie Elizabeth Bradley
- Date of birth: 20 October 1989 (age 37)
- Place of birth: Nottingham, England
- Height: 1.69 m (5 ft 6 1/2 in)
- Position: Defender

Youth career
- Gedling Town
- Nottingham Forest

Senior career*
Years	Team	Apps	(Gls)
2005–2006	Nottingham Forest		
2006–2010	Leeds United		
2010–2017	Lincoln Ladies/Notts County	45	(0)
2011	→ Nottingham Forest (loan)		
2017–2018	Doncaster Rovers Belles	11	(1)
2018–2020	Liverpool	34	(1)
2021–2022	Sheffield United	18	(1)

International career^{‡}
2010–2014	England	28	(0)
2012	Great Britain	4	(0)
- * Club domestic league appearances and goals as of 12 February 2020 ‡ National team caps and goals as of 9 February 2016

Sophie Elizabeth Bradley-Auckland (born 20 October 1989) is an English former international football defender who played for Nottingham Forest, Leeds United, Lincoln Ladies, Doncaster Rovers Belles, Liverpool, and Sheffield United.

Bradley has played for England on over 25 occasions since her debut against Austria in August 2010, including appearances at the 2011 FIFA Women's World Cup. She also featured in the Great Britain squad at the 2012 London Olympics.

== Club career ==
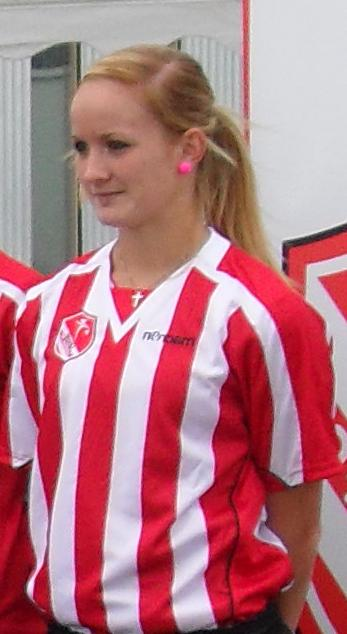
Bradley in 2010

Bradley began her career at Nottingham Forest, before joining Leeds United in 2006. She became a regular in her first season and helped Leeds to the FA Women's Premier League Cup final in March 2007. Bradley, aged 17, was named Player of the Match in Leeds' 1–0 defeat by Arsenal at Glanford Park. In 2007–08 Leeds reached the FA Women's Cup final, played in Bradley's home town of Nottingham. The Whites were beaten 4–1 by Arsenal.

Bradley progressed to captain Leeds to their 2010 Premier League Cup win over Everton, having scored in the semi-final win over Chelsea. In August 2010 Bradley signed a contract with FA WSL club Lincoln Ladies. She was instrumental in persuading several Leeds teammates to join her at Lincoln. At the end of the 2011 WSL season she returned to Nottingham Forest on loan.

Ahead of the 2014 FA WSL season, Lincoln moved to Nottingham and reconstituted as Notts County Ladies. Bradley remained with the club but suffered a severe knee injury in a July 2014 match against Yeovil Town, which caused her to miss the entire 2015 season, including the 2015 FA Women's Cup Final at Wembley Stadium, which County lost 1–0 to Chelsea.

Bradley returned to pre-season training for the 2016 FA WSL after a 19-month injury lay-off and undergoing three operations on her knee and ankle. After failing to regain her fitness, she was released by Notts County on the expiry of her contract in January 2017. In September 2017, Bradley signed for Doncaster Rovers Belles ahead of their 2017–18 FA WSL 2 campaign.

== International career ==
=== England ===
Bradley represented England at youth level and captained the Under–19s. She made her senior debut in August 2010, against Austria, as a half-time substitute for Faye White.

Bradley was named to the 2011 FIFA Women's World Cup squad, and appeared as a late substitute for White in the 1–1 draw with Mexico and the 2–1 win over New Zealand. She started the final group match with Japan, playing the full 90 minutes of England's 2–0 win. With Faye White restored to the lineup, Bradley was an unused substitute as England were eliminated by France at the quarter-final stage. Bradley was given number 176 when the FA announced their legacy numbers scheme to honour the 50th anniversary of England’s inaugural international.

=== Great Britain Olympic ===
In June 2012 Bradley was named in the 18–player Great Britain squad for the 2012 London Olympics. She was drafted into the starting line up when Ifeoma Dieke was injured, playing alongside Lincoln teammate Casey Stoney in Team GB's 1–0 win over Brazil.

== Personal life ==
In 2007 Bradley won a scholarship to the Football Association development centre at Loughborough University, through the government Talented Athlete Scholarship Scheme. In August 2008 the British Olympic Association took 152 young athletes including Bradley to the Olympic Games in Beijing.

Although paid by Lincoln and possessing an England central contract worth £16,000 per year, Bradley maintained her part-time job in the care home owned by her family while playing in the WSL.

== Honours ==
=== Individual ===
Liverpool Women's Player's Player of the Year: 2019
