= Ellen White (footballer) =

English footballer (born 1988)

Ellen White MBE
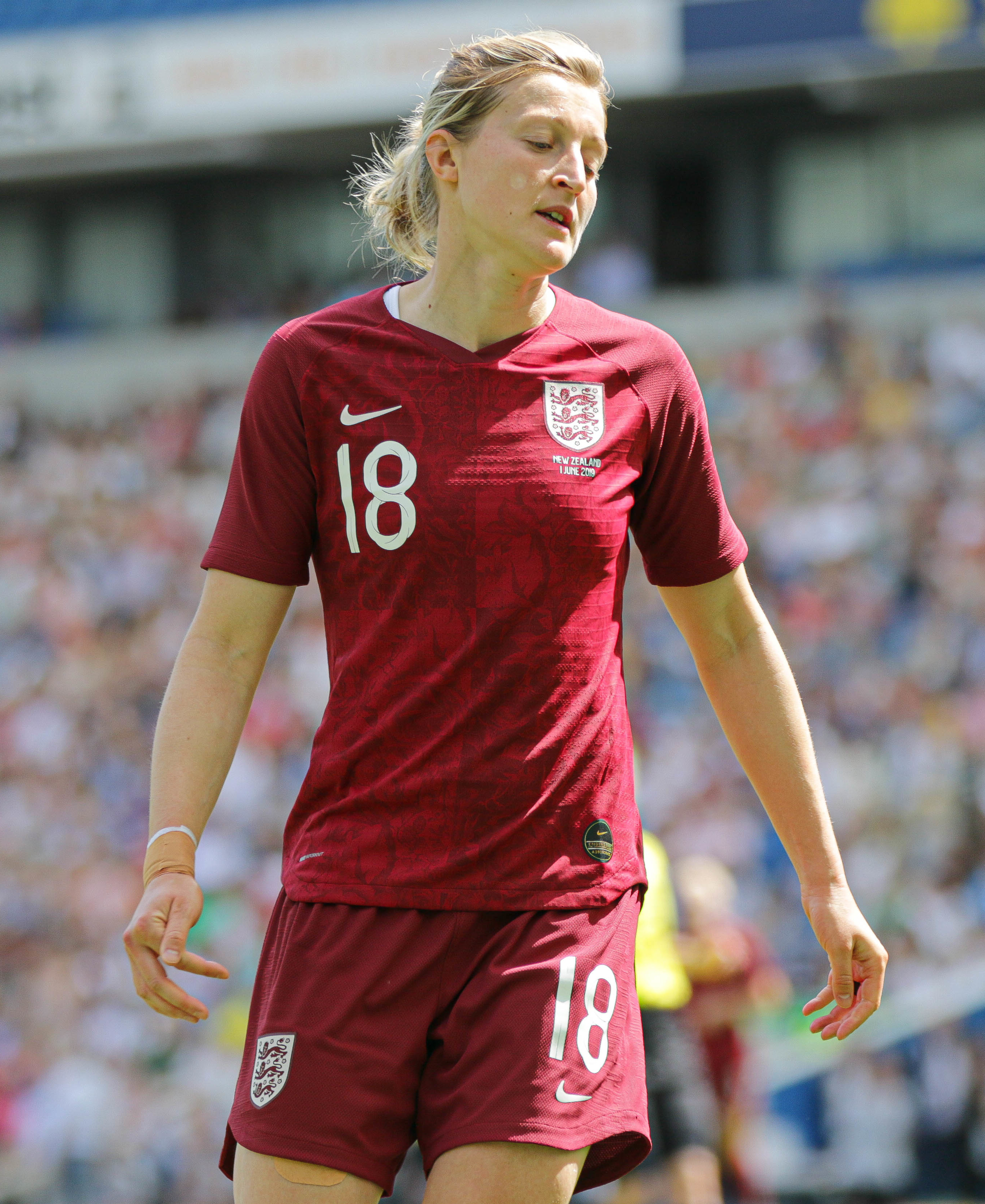
- White in 2019

Personal information
- Full name: Ellen Toni Convery
- Birth name: Ellen Toni White
- Date of birth: 9 May 1989 (age 37)
- Place of birth: Aylesbury, Buckinghamshire, England
- Height: 5 ft 7 in (1.70 m)
- Position: Forward

Youth career
- 1997–2005: Arsenal

Senior career*
Years	Team	Apps	(Gls)
2005–2008	Chelsea	48	(21)
2008–2010	Leeds Carnegie	24	(17)
2010–2013	Arsenal	38	(11)
2014–2016	Notts County	24	(6)
2017–2019	Birmingham City	26	(23)
2019–2022	Manchester City	56	(20)
Total		217	(98)

International career
2010	England U23	3	(0)
2010–2022	England	113	(52)
2012–2021	Great Britain	8	(6)
Medal record
Women's football
Representing England
FIFA Women's World Cup
Bronze medal – third place	2015 Canada
UEFA Women's Championship
Winner	2022 England
- * Club domestic league appearances and goals

Ellen Toni Convery (née White; born 9 May 1989), commonly known as Ellen White, is an English former professional footballer who played as a forward. She is the record goalscorer for the England women's national team.

Having progressed through the Arsenal academy, White returned to the Gunners in 2010, after spells with Chelsea and Leeds Carnegie. She has also played for Notts County, Birmingham City and Manchester City. White earned the WSL's Golden Boot Award for most goals scored during the 2017–18 season. With Arsenal, she won the league in 2011 and 2012; the FA Women's Cup in 2011 and 2013 and the FA WSL Cup in 2011, 2012, and 2013. With Birmingham City, she was the league's top scorer in 2018. With Manchester City, she won the Women's FA Cup in 2020, and the Women's League Cup in 2022, scoring a brace in the final.

With England, she has competed at three FIFA Women's World Cup tournaments: in the 2011, 2015 and 2019, reaching the semi-finals in 2015 and 2019 and finishing third in 2015. White earned the Bronze Boot award at the 2019 FIFA Women's World Cup in France. She represented Great Britain team at the 2012 and 2020 Summer Olympics.

White has been named England's Women's Player of the Year three times, in 2011, 2018 and 2021.

== Early life and education ==
Born and raised in Aylesbury, White attended The Grange School before attending Waddesdon Church of England School for sixth form. Because the school did not have a girls' football team, she played with the boys. Her father, Jon, ran a soccer academy called 'Mini Ducks' in Aylesbury, where she played football as a child. She then played football for Aylesbury Town, before being spotted by Arsenal scouts at the age of eight. Aged nine, she appeared on the front page of The Bucks Herald, in a report on how she had been banned from playing in a football league with boys. As part of the "Where Greatness Is Made" campaign, a plaque honouring White was installed in Aylesbury town centre in 2022.

== Club career ==
=== 2005–08: Chelsea ===
White left Arsenal aged 16 to join London rivals Chelsea in 2005. White was top scorer for Chelsea for three seasons.

=== 2008–10: Leeds United ===
White left Chelsea to join Leeds Carnegie in June 2008. Within months of signing for Leeds, she suffered a cruciate ligament injury that kept her out of the game for a lengthy spell. At the end of the 2008 season, she scored five goals in four matches. During the 2009–10 season, her five goals in seven appearances ranked second on the team. In February 2010, she scored twice as Leeds beat Everton in the final of the FA Women's Premier League Cup.

=== 2010–13: Arsenal ===
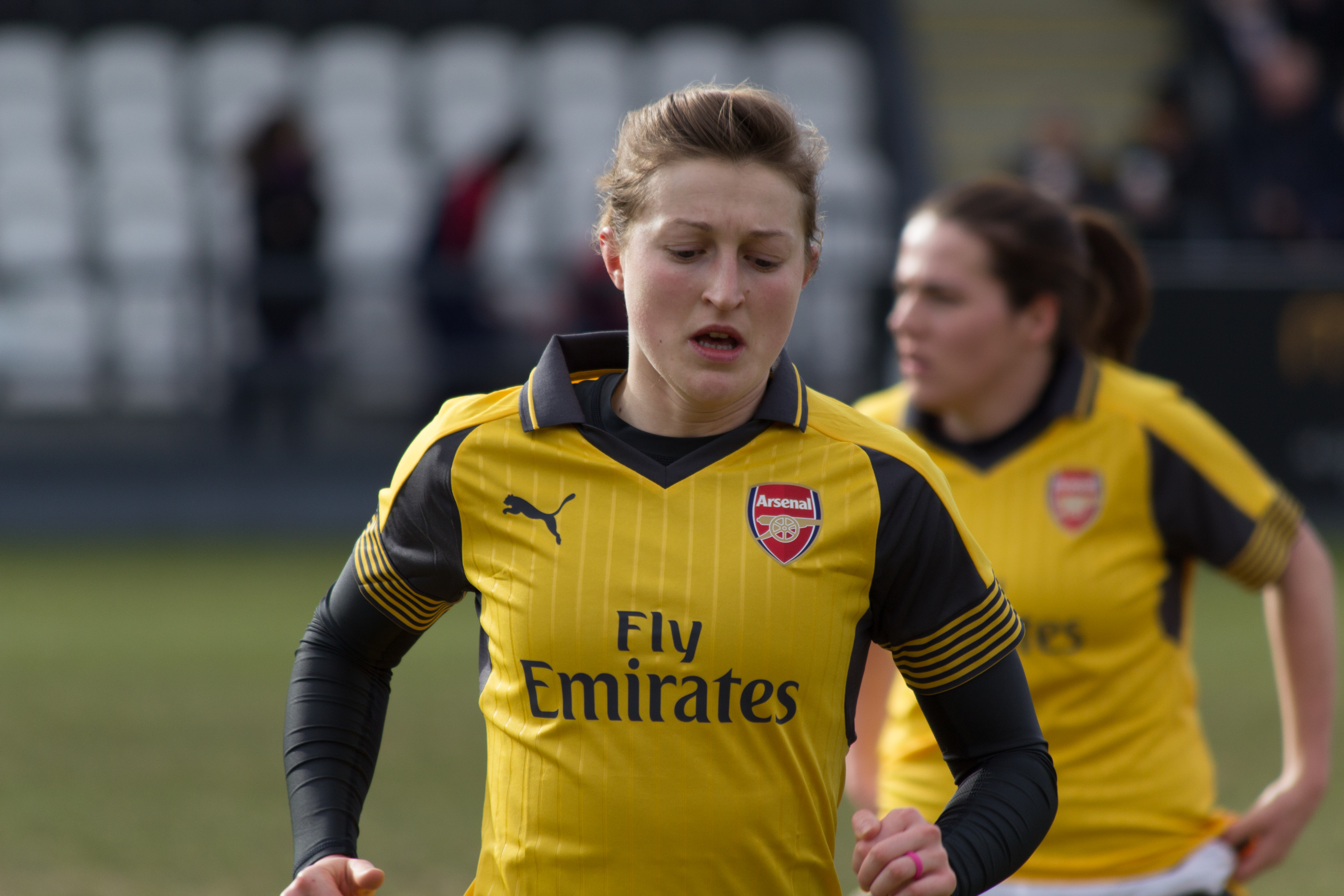
White, representing Arsenal in 2017, warming up prior to a match.

In July 2010, White returned to Arsenal after five years away, following the break up of the Leeds squad due to a funding crisis. During her time at Arsenal with manager Laura Harvey, they won three league titles and two FA Cups. During the 2011 season, she scored six goals in thirteen appearances for the club. Her first goal was a game-opener in the 40th minute of a 2–1 loss to Birmingham City. Arsenal finished first in the league with a 10–2–2 record. White's six goals ranked fourth highest in the league and second highest on the team. The same year, she helped the club win the 2011 FA WSL Cup and 2010–11 FA Women's Cup. During the semi-final of the 2010–11 FA Women's Cup, she scored a hat-trick lifting Arsenal to a 5–0 win over Barnet and berth to the final where they defeated Bristol Academy 2–0.

During the 2012 season, White scored three goals in ten appearances. On 23 September, she scored a brace against Liverpool lifting the team to a 4–0 win. Her final goal of the season during a 1–1 draw against Birmingham City on 7 October ensured that Arsenal finished the season undefeated and in first place with a 10–0–4 record.

White scored 2 goals in 14 appearances during the 2013 season. Arsenal finished in first place for the third consecutive season of the new league.

=== 2013–16: Notts County ===
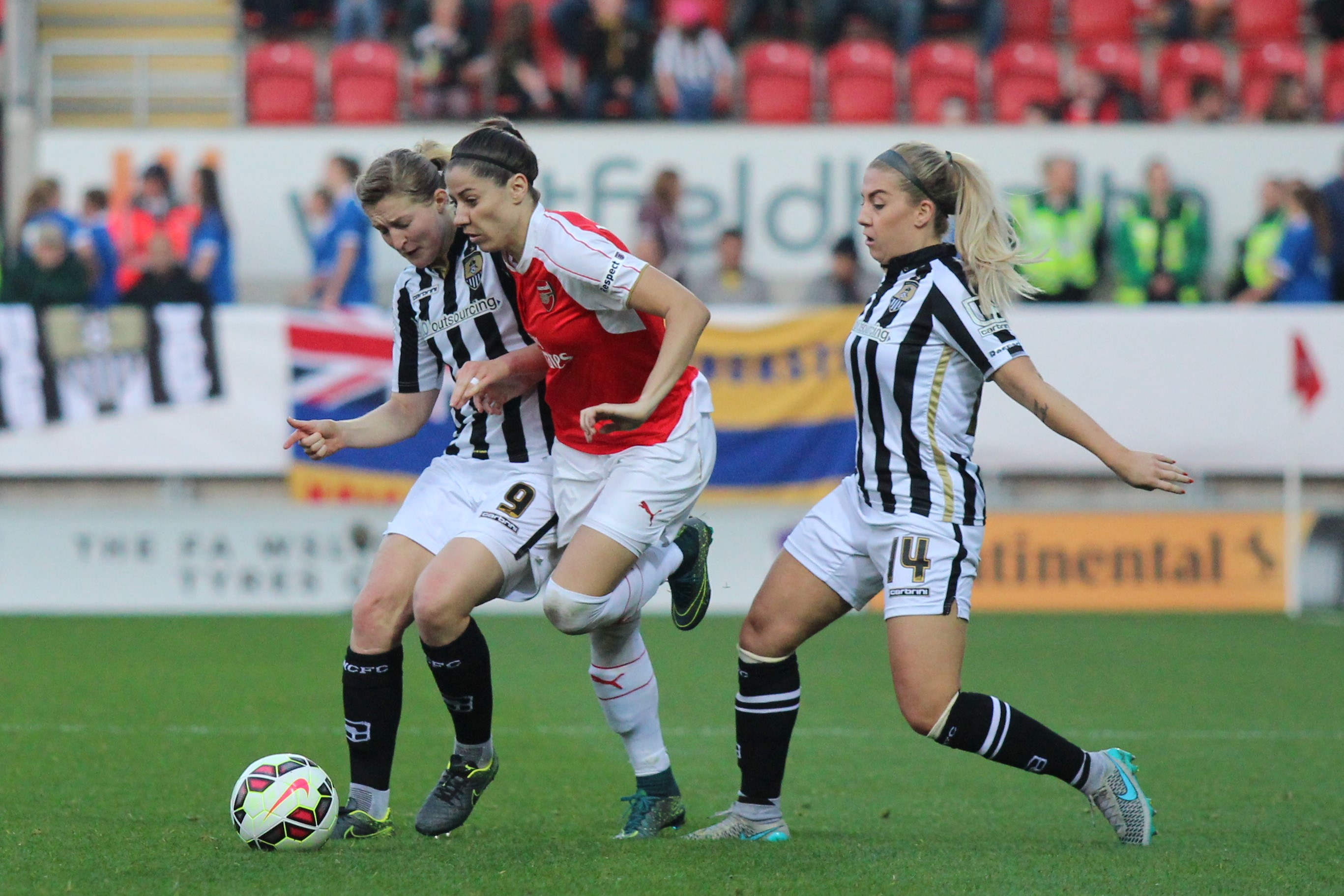
White (left) for Notts County in 2015.

White left Arsenal at the end of the 2013 season, joining Notts County on a three-year deal ahead of the 2014 season. In April, White suffered an ACL injury and was out for the entire WSL season. In January 2015, the club confirmed that she was back in training ahead of the 2015 season. White scored a goal and assist in her first two games since returning from injury. She finished the season with 3 goals in 14 appearances. Notts County finished the regular season in fifth place. White scored three goals for Notts County during the 2016 season in ten appearances. The club finished in sixth place during the regular season.

=== 2017–19: Birmingham City ===
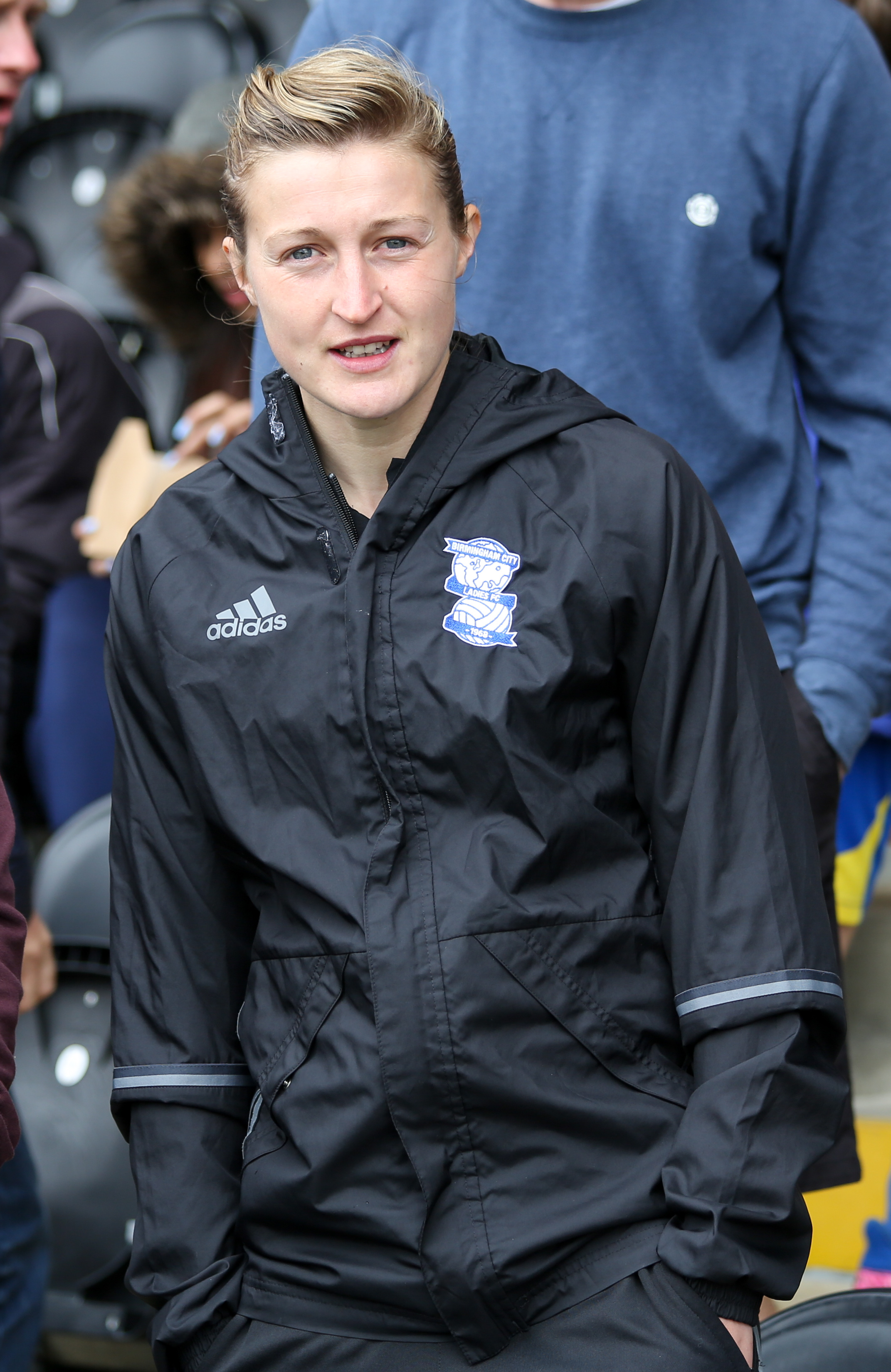
White with Birmingham City in 2017

White left Notts County in 2017 and signed for Birmingham City after her contract had expired. Despite being offered a new contract by Notts County, White made the move to the West Midlands, which seemed even more prudent after the latter were disbanded. White scored the winning penalty against Chelsea to take Birmingham City to the 2017 FA Women's Cup final where they were defeated 4–1 by Manchester City. During the FA WSL 1 Spring Series, White scored two goals in four appearances. Birmingham City finished in seventh place. During the 2017–18 season, her 15 goals in 14 matches ranked first in the league. She scored a game-winning brace against Bristol City on 28 March and a hat-trick against Arsenal on 29 April securing the club's 3–0 win. Birmingham City finished in fifth place during the regular season. During the 2018–19 season, White scored six goals in eight appearances. On 17 April 2019, she scored a brace against Everton, lifting Birmingham City to a 3–1 win. On 28 April, she scored a game-winning brace against Liverpool. Birmingham City finished in fourth place during the regular season with a 13–6–1 record.

=== 2019–22: Manchester City ===
In May 2019, White announced she was joining Manchester City, signing on 1 July on a two-year deal. At the start of the 2019–20 season, White suffered a knee injury requiring surgery causing her to miss the 2019 Women's International Champions Cup and the first three months of the season. White's first appearance for Manchester City was in their Champions League defeat to Atlético Madrid. White's first goal for the club was against her former club Birmingham City in the League Cup. On 7 November 2020 White became the second player in WSL history to reach fifty goals after she scored a brace in Manchester City's 8–1 victory over Bristol City. On 7 February 2021 she became the all-time record goal scorer in the WSL, having scored 55 times to Vivianne Miedema's 54. On 22 May 2021, White signed a two-year contract with Manchester City, keeping her there until 2023; White announced her retirement on 22 August 2022 after winning the Euros with England. Earlier in the month, she had not returned to training with the other Lionesses in the Manchester City squad after the Euro break, citing "personal reasons" at the time.

== International career ==
=== England ===
White played for England at under-17, under-19, under-20 and under-23 levels. She made her senior England debut in March 2010 at home to Austria, scoring in the final minute as England won 3–0.

After being selected in England's 2011 FIFA Women's World Cup squad, White scored in a 2–0 group stage win over Japan, who ultimately won the trophy. White was recognised for her form over 2011, being voted the England Women's Player of the Year.

White was selected for England's UEFA Women's Euro 2013 squad. However, after scoring England's only goal in the friendly defeat to Sweden leading into the tournament, White was left frustrated by lack of service throughout the tournament as England failed to progress from the group stage.

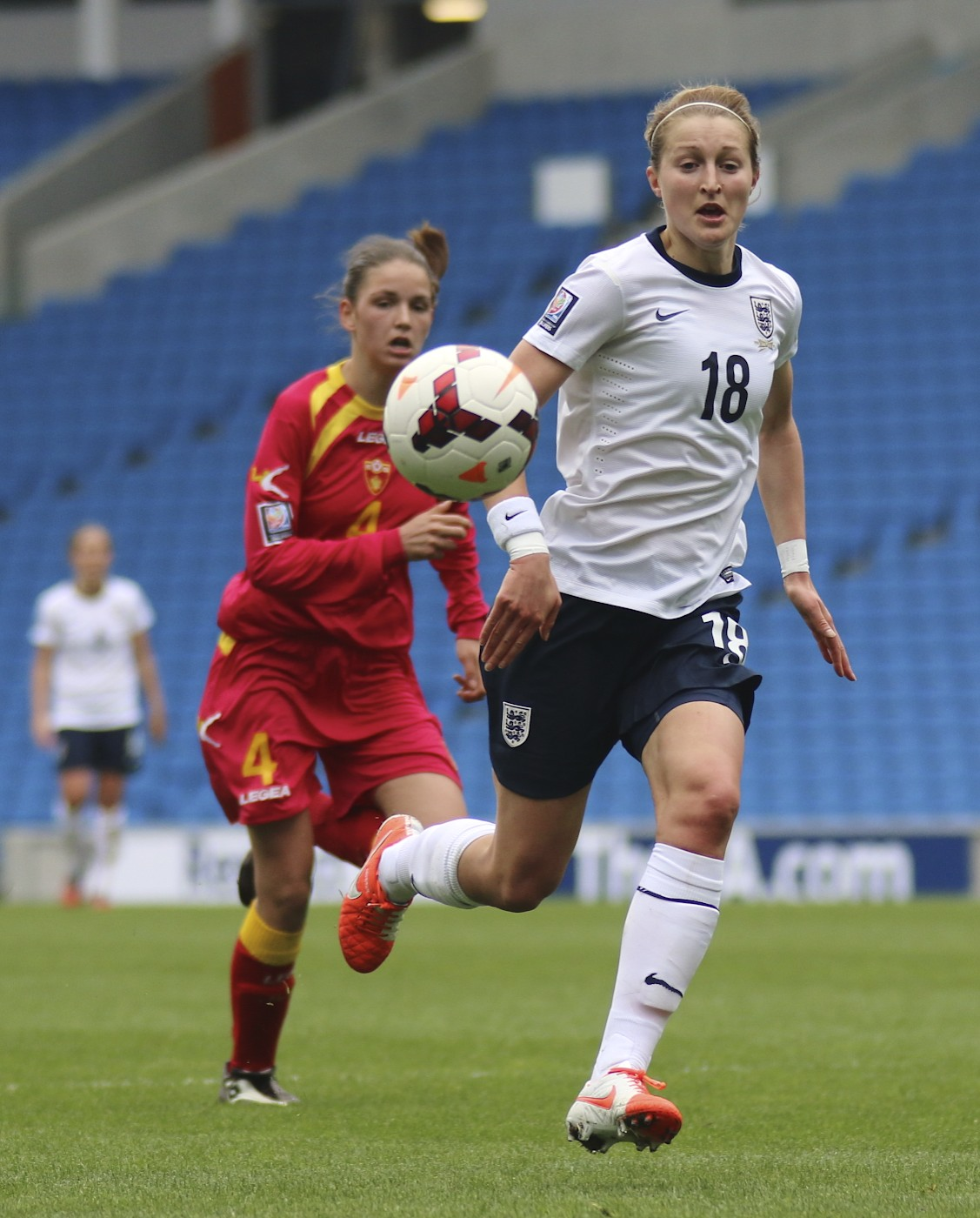
White (right) playing for England against Montenegro in April 2014.

Just months after returning from an anterior cruciate ligament injury, White was called up for pre-World Cup friendlies in April 2015. White also made the final squad for England's 2015 FIFA Women's World Cup team, after scoring three in qualification, netting two in an 8–0 win over Turkey and another in a 6–0 win over Belarus. White failed to score in the finals, however, which saw England finish third—their best World Cup performance.

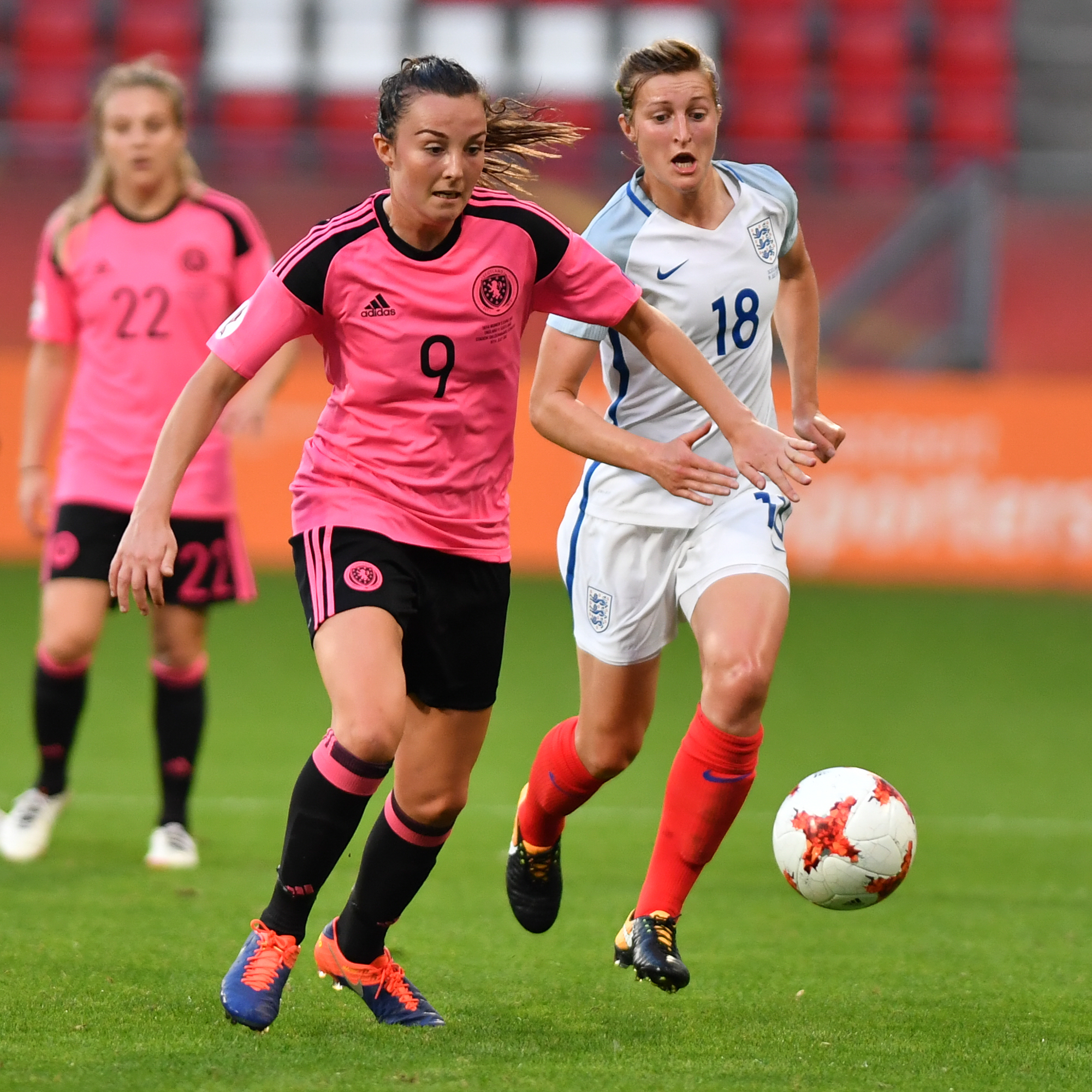
White (right) playing against Scotland at the 2017 Women's Euros.

White scored in England's opening match of the 2017 Women's Euros in a 6–0 win over Scotland. This followed two goals in qualifying, in two different 7–0 victories over Serbia. England finished top of group D, but were knocked out in the semi-finals by the eventual tournament champions Netherlands.

White scored twice in the 2018 SheBelieves Cup, both coming in England's match against Germany. White was joint top scorer in the competition which saw England finish second. In the 2019 edition, England won the tournament for the first time, with White scoring once against Brazil.

At the 2019 Women's World Cup, White scored in England's opening game against Scotland, before scoring twice in England's final group stage game against Japan. She scored her fourth of the tournament in the round of 16 match against Cameroon, and later scored her fifth in a 3–0 quarter final win over Norway. In the semi-final match against the United States, White scored the equaliser before having a second goal disallowed by video assistant referee (VAR). She also won a penalty for England; however, the penalty was not converted and England were beaten by the holders – losing 2–1. Her performance during the tournament has been compared with that of Harry Kane's World Cup performance due to their similar goal scoring record. England finished in fourth place, losing to Sweden 2–1 in the third place play-off; although, White had a goal ruled out for handball by VAR. White ended the tournament as joint top goalscorer with six goals, with that, she became England women's all-time top World Cup goalscorer and was awarded the Bronze Boot—as she recorded fewer assists than Silver and Golden Boot winners Alex Morgan and Megan Rapinoe respectively.

On her return to the national team following a three month long injury, White scored in a 2–1 defeat to Germany at Wembley Stadium. The game attracted a record crowd for a Lioness' game of 77,768.

During England's first game of 2021, and first in 11 months, White scored a hat-trick in a 6–0 thrashing of Northern Ireland.

White made her 100th cap for England against Austria on 27 November 2021 and scored the only goal in a 1–0 win, continuing England's one hundred percent winning run in qualification for the 2023 FIFA Women's World Cup. The following game, White became England's all time record goals scorer, scoring a hat-trick in a 20–0 defeat of Latvia. The game was a multi-record breaking game as four players scored a hat-trick for the first time in an England game and was the largest victory for both men's and women's senior England sides, surpassing the women's team's 2005 13–0 win against Hungary and the men's 1882 13–0 win against Ireland.

In June 2022, White was included in the England squad for the UEFA Women's Euro 2022. White started all six games and scored two goals in an 8–0 victory over Norway, a record win for a game in either the men's or women's European Championships. England won the tournament beating Germany 2–1 in the final, England's first major tournament trophy since the men's World Cup in 1966. Following the win, White appeared on the cover of OK! with fellow Lionesses Lucy Bronze and Keira Walsh; the three were interviewed about the state of women's football.

A month after the tournament, White announced her retirement from football on 22 August 2022, departing as England's top female goal scorer and third overall goal scorer with 52 international goals (behind Wayne Rooney's 53 and Harry Kane's 63). In a letter shared on Twitter, White wrote that "this is my time to say goodbye to football and watch the next generation shine", adding that it had been an honour to play football for England and that her dreams had come true by winning the European title. England manager Sarina Wiegman paid tribute to White after the announcement, saying that "the game will miss her greatly."

Following her retirement after the Euros victory, White was appointed Member of the Order of the British Empire (MBE) in the 2023 New Year Honours for services to association football.

White was allotted 174 when the FA announced their legacy numbers scheme to honour the 50th anniversary of England's inaugural international.

=== Great Britain Olympics ===
In June 2012, White was named in the 18-woman Great Britain squad for the 2012 Summer Olympics in London, where Team GB finished the tournament as quarter-finalists after finishing top of their group.

After being selected for the 2020 Summer Olympics in Tokyo, White scored twice as Team GB played a warm up match against New Zealand. She scored three times during the group stage including a brace in GB's Group E opener against Chile, in addition to a hat-trick against Australia in the quarter final, which Team GB lost 4–3 in extra time after the score was 2–2 at the end of the 90 minutes.

== Personal life ==
White is married to Callum Convery. White comes from a family of West Ham United supporters who, alongside her husband, regularly attended her matches. The couple's first child was born in 2023.

In 2016, White was awarded the title of Honorary Freewoman of the Parish of Aylesbury by Aylesbury Town Council.

On 10 June 2024, White made her England Soccer Aid debut, scoring in a 6–3 victory for England in the match that raised £15 million for UNICEF; and in doing so, became the event's first female goalscorer.

== Career statistics ==
=== Club ===
As of end of 2021–22 season

Appearances and goals by club, season and competition
Club	Season	League			FA Cup		League Cup		Shield		Europe		Total	
Club	Season	Division	Apps	Goals	Apps	Goals	Apps	Goals	Apps	Goals	Apps	Goals	Apps	Goals
Chelsea	2005–06	WPL	15	4	1	1	—		—		—		16	5
Chelsea	2006–07	WPL	16	11	4	4	—		—		—		20	15
Chelsea	2007–08	WPL	17	6	2	2	—		—		—		19	8
Chelsea	Total		48	21	7	7	—		—		—		55	28
Leeds Carnegie	2008–09	WPL	2	2	0	0	—		—		—		2	2
Leeds Carnegie	2009–10	WPL	22	15	4	3	—		—		—		26	18
Leeds Carnegie	Total		24	17	4	3	—		—		—		28	20
Arsenal	2011	WSL 1	14	6	4	5	3	2	—		8	3	29	16
Arsenal	2012	WSL 1	10	3	2	2	4	1	—		8	3	23	9
Arsenal	2013	WSL 1	14	2	4	5	5	5	—		8	2	31	13
Arsenal	Arsenal UWCL (Note: For 2013—14 season; statistics listed in 2013 is for the 2012–13 season, 2012 is for the 2011–12 season, and 2011 is for the 2010–11 season.)		—		—		—		—		4	1	4	1
Arsenal	Total		38	11	10	12	12	8	—		28	8	88	39
Notts County	2014	WSL 1	0	0	?	?	0	0	—		—		0	0
Notts County	2015	WSL 1	14	3	?	?	7	6	—		—		21	9
Notts County	2016	WSL 1	10	3	?	?	2	2	—		—		12	5
Notts County	Total		24	6	?	?	9	8	—		—		33	14
Birmingham City	2017	WSL SS	4	2	?	?	—		—		—		4	2
Birmingham City	2017–18	WSL	14	15	?	?	0	0	—		—		14	15
Birmingham City	2018–19	WSL	8	6	?	?	2	0	—		—		10	6
Birmingham City	Total		26	23	?	?	2	0	—		—		28	23
Manchester City	2019–20	WSL	12	6	1	2	4	1	—		1	0	18	9
Manchester City	2020–21	WSL	22	10	4	2	3	0	1	0	6	3	36	15
Manchester City	2021–22	WSL	22	4	4	3	7	3	—		1	0	34	10
Manchester City	Total		56	20	9	8	14	4	1	0	8	3	88	35
Career total			215	98	20	18	33	18	1	0	36	11	305	145

=== International ===
Statistics accurate as of match played 31 July 2022.

Year	England		Great Britain	
Year	Apps	Goals	Apps	Goals
2010	8	4	0	0
2011	8	4	0	0
2012	3	1	4	0
2013	7	8	0	0
2014	1	0	0	0
2015	9	0	0	0
2016	2	2	0	0
2017	12	5	0	0
2018	6	2	0	0
2019	15	9	0	0
2020	3	1	0	0
2021	9	12	4	6
2022	12	4	0	0
Total	113	52	8	6

== Honours ==
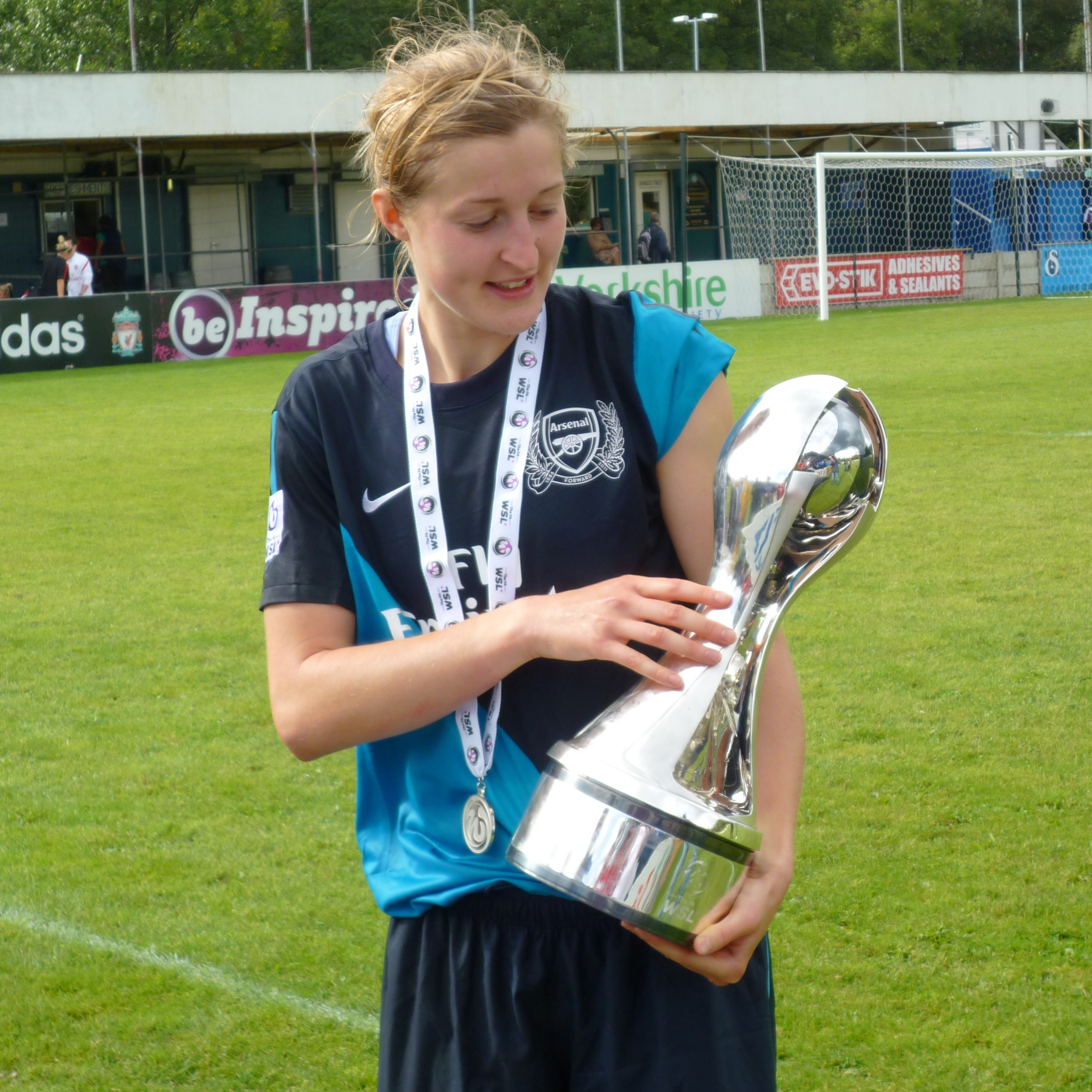
White with the 2011 FA WSL trophy

Leeds Carnegie

- FA Women's Premier League Cup: 2010

Arsenal

- FA WSL: 2011, 2012
- FA Women's Cup: 2011, 2013
- FA WSL Cup: 2011, 2012, 2013

Manchester City

- Women's FA Cup: 2019–20
- FA WSL Cup: 2021–22

England U19

- UEFA Women's Under-19 Championship runner-up: 2007

England

- FIFA Women's World Cup third place: 2015
- UEFA Women's Championship: 2022
- Cyprus Women's Cup: 2013
- SheBelieves Cup: 2019
- Arnold Clark Cup: 2022

Individual

- England Women's Player of the Year: 2011, 2018, 2020–21
- WSL 1 Player of the Month: March 2018
- WSL 1 Golden Boot: 2017–18
- FIFA Women's World Cup Bronze Boot: 2019
- Freedom of the City of London (announced 1 August 2022)
- Women's Super League Hall of Fame: 2023
- English Football Hall of Fame: 2026

Orders

- Member of the Most Excellent Order of the British Empire in the 2023 New Year Honours

Records

- Great Britain women's all time record goal scorer: 6 goals
- England women's all time record goal scorer: 52 goals
- England women's FIFA Women's World Cup all time record goal scorer: 7 goals

== See also ==
- List of UEFA Women's Championship goalscorers
- List of English women's football champions
- List of players who have appeared in multiple FIFA Women's World Cups
- List of FA WSL hat-tricks
- List of England women's international footballers
