= Ashby Avenue (stadium) =

Football stadium

- The Avenue
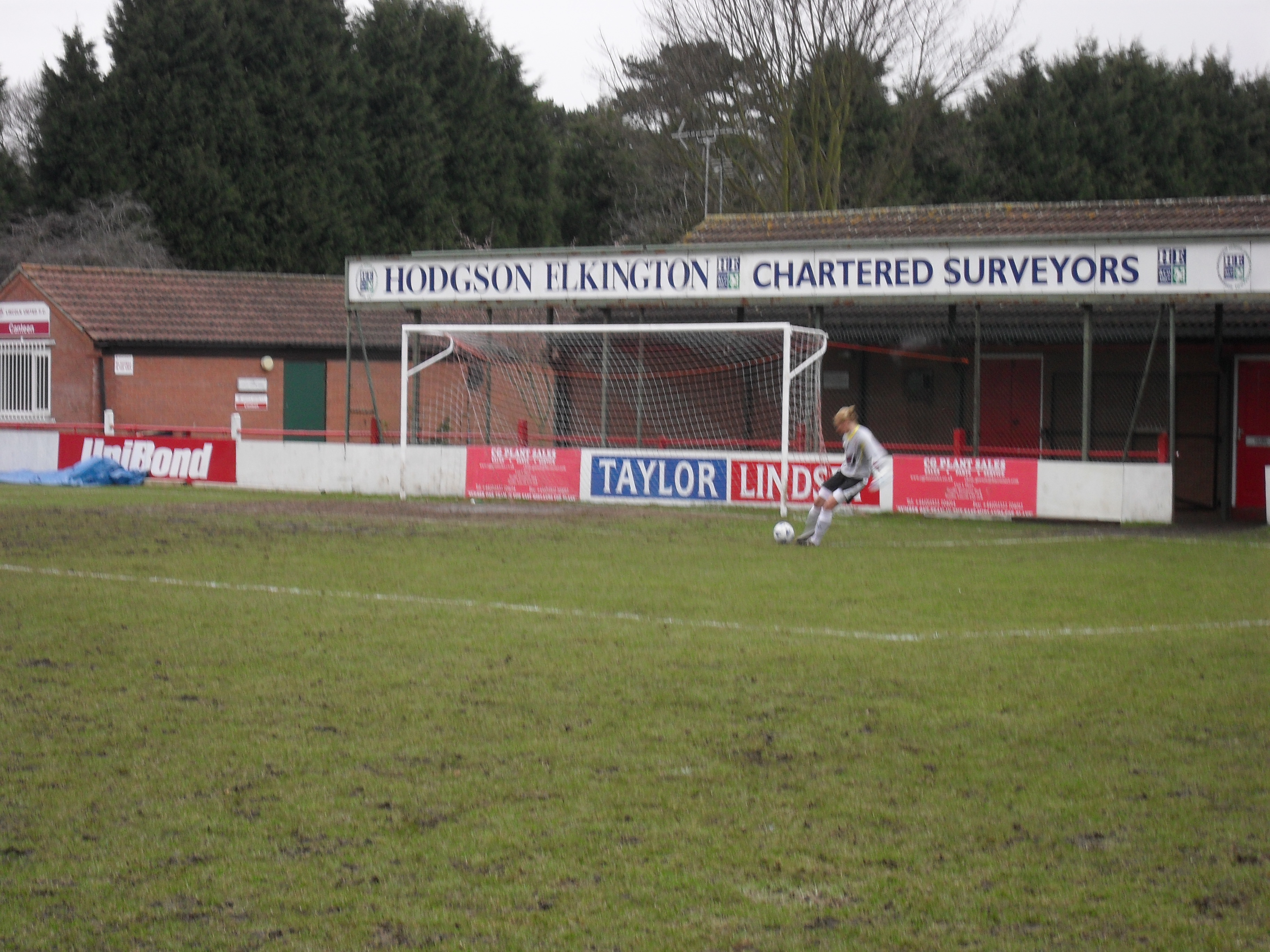
- The Willy White Suite and Bryan Smith memorial dressing rooms in 2010, seen from the Main Stand

- Location in Lincolnshire
- Location: Lincoln, Lincolnshire
- Coordinates: 53°12′38″N 0°35′03″W
- Owner: Lincoln United F.C.
- Capacity: 2,714 (250 seated)
- Surface: Grass

Construction
- Renovated: 1994

Tenants
- Lincoln United F.C. Lincoln Ladies F.C. (2009–2010, 2012)

Ashby Avenue is a football stadium in Lincoln, Lincolnshire, England. It is the home ground of Lincoln United of the Northern Premier League Division One East. Since July 2009, Lincoln United Ladies also play their home games at Ashby Avenue. The stadium is located in the Hartsholme area of the city, backing onto Hartsholme Country Park. It has a total capacity of 2,714, with a seated Main Stand which holds around 250.

In August 2012 Lincoln United sold the stadium naming rights to NTR Solutions, a telecommunications firm, for a reported five–figure fee.

== History ==
A 6–1 friendly defeat against Premier League club Nottingham Forest in 1992 marked the official opening of the Bryan Smith memorial dressing rooms.

1994 saw the construction of the Willy White Suite, the seated Main Stand and the Claudine Morley (South) Stand.

== Structure and facilities ==
Entry is via turnstile at the north end of the stadium, which has a covered standing area behind the goal. Mesh protects the Bryan Smith memorial dressing rooms. A separate canteen building named the Willy White Suite stands beside the dressing rooms.

On the half way line there is an integrated press box and dugout structure, which includes a gantry for television cameras. The covered Arthur Simpson Stand, with two rows of bench seating, runs down to the John Wilkinson Stand, a standing terrace which runs along the south end of the pitch. The Main Stand, the Weston's stand, has four rows of individual tip-up seats which provide covered seating for approximately 250 spectators.

== Gallery ==
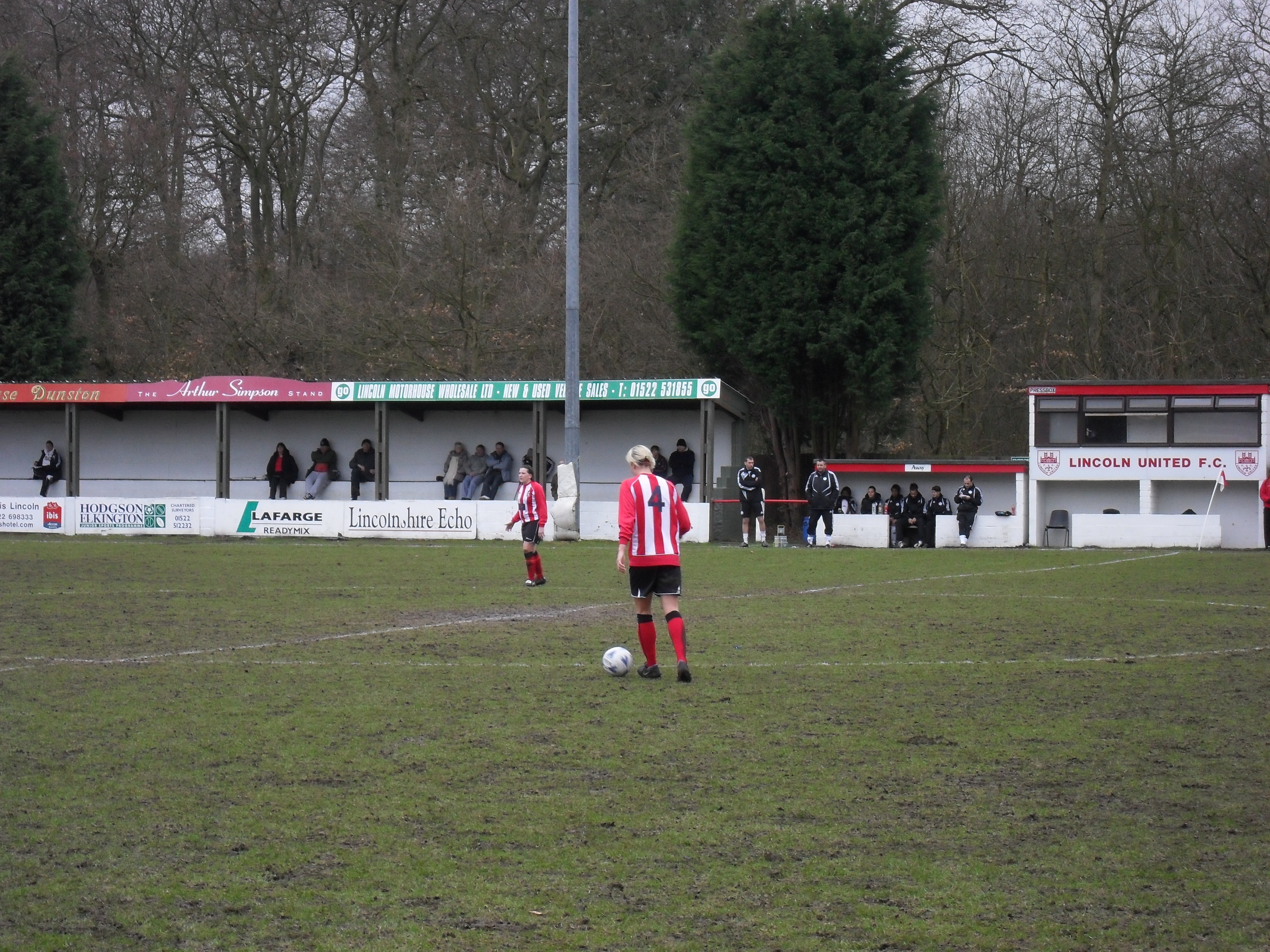
Arthur Simpson Stand

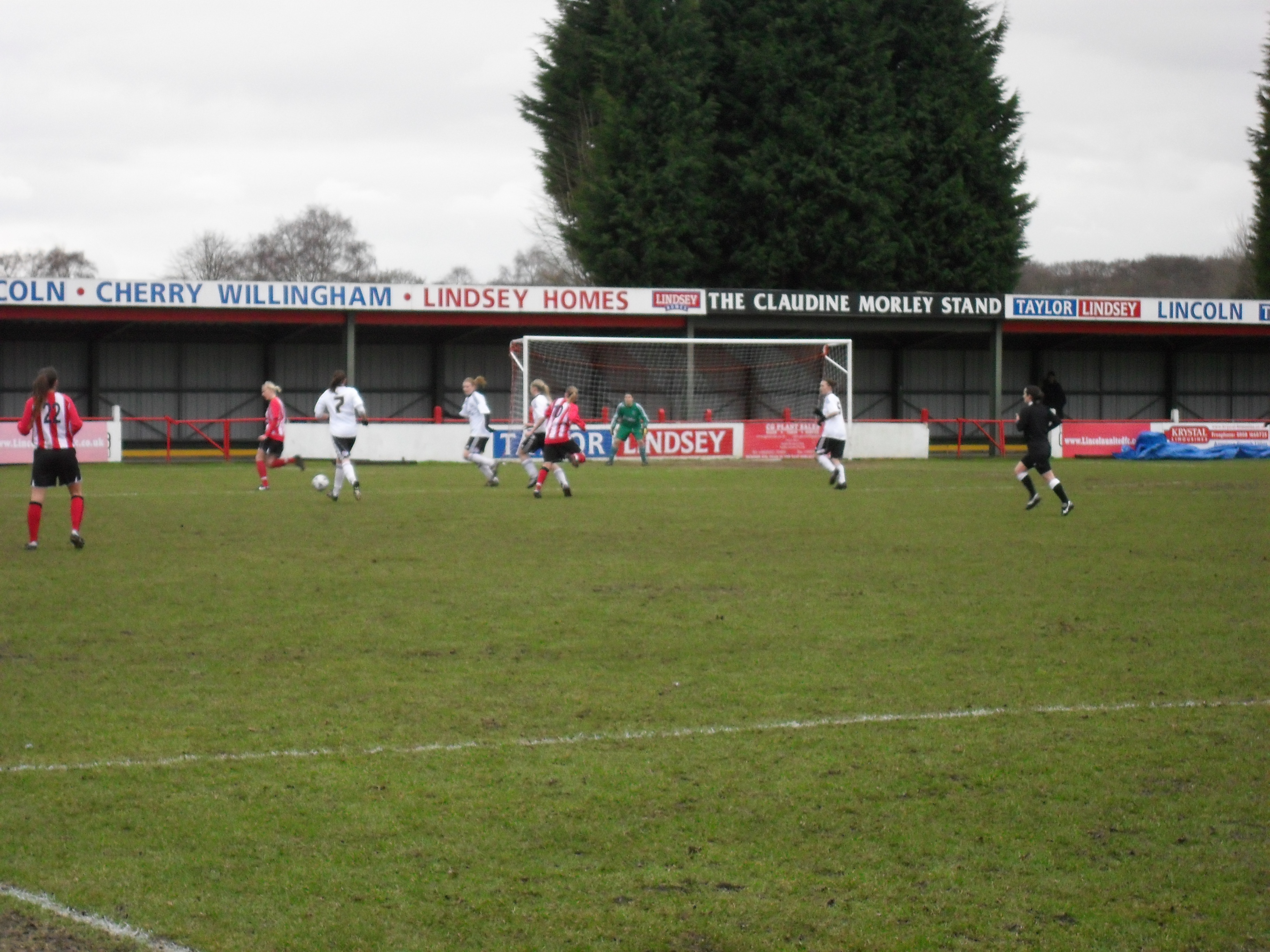
John Wilkinson Stand
