= 2012 FA WSL =

English women's football season

FA WSL
- Season: 2012
- Champions: Arsenal
- Champions League: Arsenal; Birmingham City
- Matches: 56
- Goals: 180 (3.21 per match)
- Top goalscorer: Kim Little (11)
- Biggest home win: Birmingham 4–0 Doncaster Rovers Belles; 6 May 2012
- Biggest away win: Doncaster Rovers Belles 0–4 Arsenal; 25 August 2012
- Highest scoring: Liverpool 2–5 Birmingham City; 9 September 2012
- Highest attendance: 5052; Arsenal v Chelsea
- Lowest attendance: 105; Liverpool v Bristol Academy

The 2012 FA WSL was the second season of the FA WSL, the top-level women's football league of England. The season began on 8 April 2012 and was scheduled to end in October 2012. The league had a break between 8 July and 19 August to allow preparation for the 2012 London Olympics.

Arsenal won the competition, their ninth consecutive English title. Entry to the 2013–14 UEFA Women's Champions League was earned by Arsenal, as champions, and Birmingham City, as runners–up.

== Teams ==
Team	Location	Ground	2011 season
Arsenal	Borehamwood	Meadow Park	FA WSL, 1st
Birmingham City	Stratford-upon-Avon	The DCS Stadium	FA WSL, 2nd
Bristol Academy	Filton	Stoke Gifford Stadium	FA WSL, 5th
Chelsea	Staines	Wheatsheaf Park	FA WSL, 6th
Doncaster Rovers Belles	Doncaster	Keepmoat Stadium	FA WSL, 7th
Everton	Crosby	The Arriva Park	FA WSL, 3rd
Lincoln	Lincoln	Ashby Avenue	FA WSL, 4th
Liverpool	Skelmersdale	Skelmersdale & Ormskirk College Stadium	FA WSL, 8th

Locations of the 2012 Super League teams

== League table ==
Pos	Team	Pld	W	D	L	GF	GA	GD	Pts	Qualification
1	Arsenal (C)	14	10	4	0	39	18	+21	34	Qualification for the Champions League knockout phase
2	Birmingham City	14	7	5	2	31	18	+13	26	Qualification for the Champions League knockout phase
3	Everton	14	7	4	3	20	16	+4	25	
4	Bristol Academy	14	4	6	4	17	16	+1	18	
5	Lincoln	14	5	3	6	24	26	−2	18	
6	Chelsea	14	5	2	7	20	23	−3	17	
7	Doncaster Rovers Belles	14	3	2	9	14	28	−14	11	
8	Liverpool	14	1	2	11	15	35	−20	5	

Source: FA WSL results
Rules for classification: 1) Points; 2) Goal difference; 3) Number of goals scored
(C) Champions

== Results ==
Home \ Away	ARS	BIR	BRI	CHE	DON	EVE	LIV	LIN
Arsenal		4–2	1–1	3–1	3–2	3–2	4–1	2–1
Birmingham City	1–1		1–1	4–2	4–0	1–2	3–1	3–1
Bristol Academy	0–3	2–2		0–1	3–2	1–1	1–0	0–1
Chelsea	2–4	0–1	0–0		3–1	3–1	2–2	2–3
Doncaster Rovers Belles	0–4	0–2	1–1	0–1		1–2	0–2	2–1
Everton	2–2	0–0	1–0	2–1	1–1		2–0	1–0
Liverpool	0–2	2–5	1–4	0–2	0–2	1–2		2–3
Lincoln	3–3	2–2	1–3	2–0	1–2	2–1	3–3	

Updated to match(es) played on 7 October 2012. Source: WSL matches
Legend: Blue = home team win; Yellow = draw; Red = away team win.

== Top scorers ==
Players with at least five goals.

Rank	Scorer	Club	Goals
1	(Scotland) Kim Little	Arsenal	11
2	(England) Jodie Taylor	Birmingham	8
3	(England) Precious Hamilton	Lincoln	7
3	(Wales) Helen Lander	Chelsea	7
5	(England) Rachel Williams	Birmingham	6
6	(England) Remi Allen	Lincoln	5
6	(England) Katie Chapman	Arsenal	5
6	(England) Toni Duggan	Everton	5
6	(England) Jordan Nobbs	Arsenal	5
6	(England) Fara Williams	Everton	5
