= Notts County Ladies F.C. =

Defunct ladies football club in Nottingham, England

Notts County Ladies FC
- Full name: Notts County Ladies Football Club
- Nickname: Lady Magpies
- Founded: 1995 (as Lincoln Ladies); 2014 (as Notts County Ladies)
- Dissolved: 2017
- Ground: Meadow Lane; Nottingham
- Capacity: 20,229
- 2016: 6th

Notts County Ladies Football Club was a women's football club based in Nottingham, England. They played their home games at Meadow Lane.

Notts County Ladies were created in 2014 when Lincoln Ladies were relocated from Lincoln to Nottingham and rebranded. The club were originally formed in Lincoln in 1995 and also spent a period known as Lincoln City Ladies while affiliated to Lincoln City. Sincil Bank and other smaller venues staged the club's matches during their time in Lincoln. The club was named OOH Lincoln Ladies from 2008 until 2010, due to sponsorship from Ray Trew's OOH Media PLC.

The club withdrew from the FA WSL 1, the top tier in the English women's football league system, two days before the start of the FA WSL Spring Series on 21 April 2017.

== Lincoln Ladies ==
Logo from OOH Lincoln era 2008–2010

Lincoln Ladies FC were founded in 1995 and began playing in the East Midlands Combination League. The club was promoted in each of the following seasons, bar one, until reaching the FA Women's Premier League Northern Division in 2002. This feat was achieved with the same core group of players. The team finished as league runners-up in four successive seasons (2006–07, 2007–08, 2008–09, 2009–10) and reached the semi-final of the FA Women's Cup in 2007–08.

A five-year sponsorship deal with former Lincoln City F.C. board member Ray Trew in June 2008 led to the club's change of name to OOH Lincoln Ladies. Trew had previously sponsored the club through his SportsTV company, and made available extra funds for signings such as England internationals Kay Hawke and Amanda Barr to assist the club's promotion bid.

In November 2009 the club announced a bid to join the FA WSL. If successful the club planned to divide home games between Sincil Bank and current home, Ashby Avenue. In 2009–10 they had taken second place in the FA Women's Premier League Northern Division to Liverpool LFC, after finishing second to Sunderland WFC, Nottingham Forest and Liverpool LFC in the three previous seasons.

On 22 March 2010 Lincoln were announced as one of the eight FA WSL teams for the inaugural 2011 season, which was televised on ESPN. In August 2010 the club signed Jess Clarke and Sophie Bradley for their FA WSL campaign. In the same week Sue Smith also joined from Leeds United. Weeks before the start of the new competition, Lincoln made another major signing with the capture of Casey Stoney from Chelsea.

=== Stadia ===
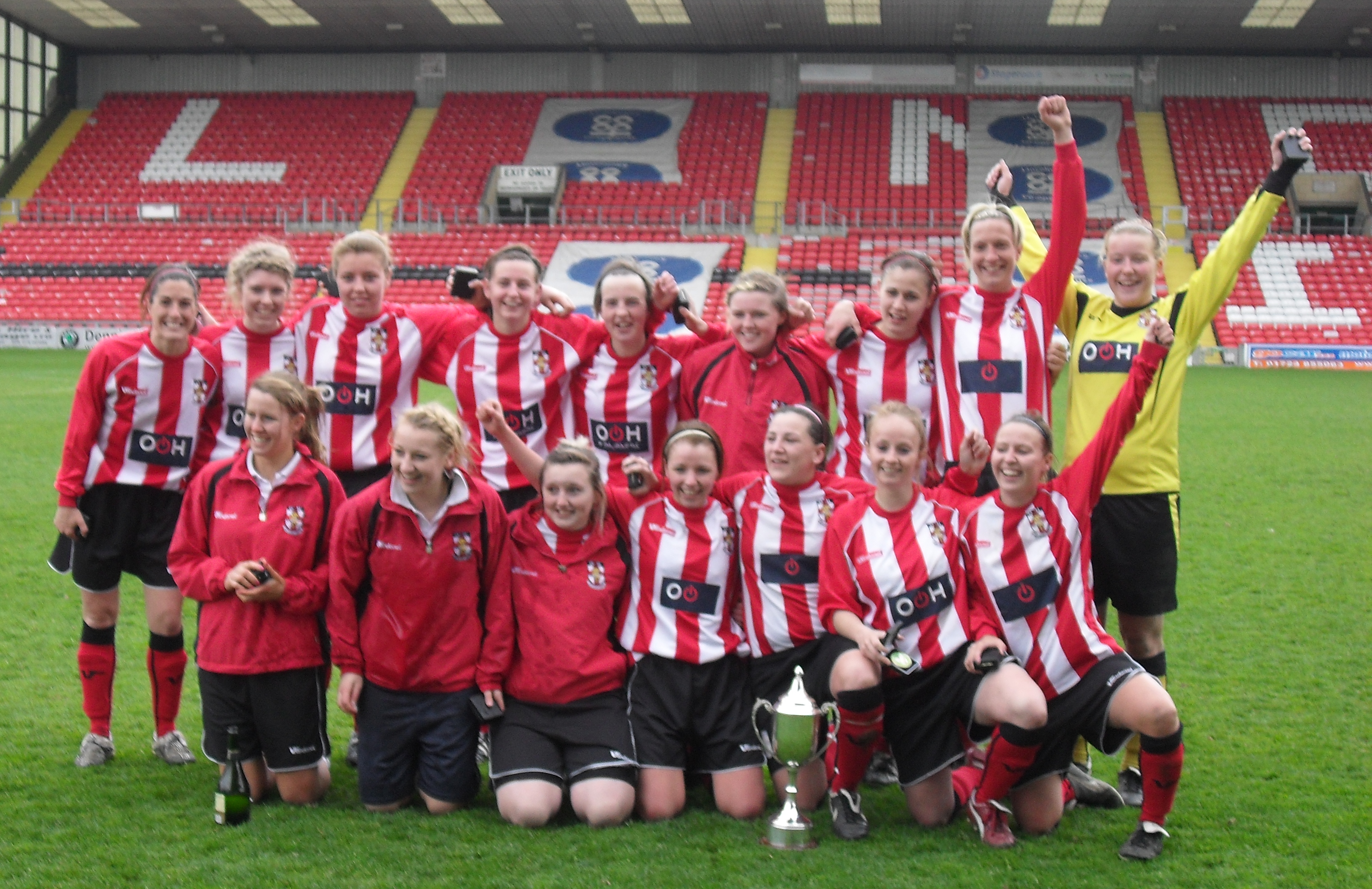
Lincoln Ladies in 2010

Lincoln Ladies FC ground-shared with Lincoln United F.C. at Ashby Avenue after summer 2009. Before that the club spent three seasons playing in Collingham, Nottinghamshire at the Station Road ground, which became a "fortress".

In 2002–03 the club played their home games at Sincil Bank and became the first women's club to play a full season at a professional Football League stadium.

On 7 January 2013 the club announced that they would play their fixtures for the 2013 FA WSL at Sincil Bank.

=== Supporters ===
Lincoln Ladies FC claimed to have had one of the largest fanbases of any female club in England. The FA Women's Cup semi-final in 2008 attracted 3,000 fans to Sincil Bank, while over 1,500 attended other high-profile home matches. By the last two seasons in Lincoln, 2012 and 2013, average home attendances had slumped to 526 and 269 respectively.

=== Lincoln City Women ===
In 2019, Nettleham LFC rebranded to Lincoln City Women F.C. and became the new team affiliated with Lincoln City F.C. They are often mistaken for Lincoln Ladies but held no connection to the original team.

== Notts County Ladies ==
=== Move to Nottingham ===
On 26 April 2013, the club said it would become Notts County Ladies from the 2014 season onwards, but did not reveal logistics of the presumed move to Nottingham. This has not been without controversy. There was talk of creating a wholly new team in Lincoln as a consequence; in 2019, Lincoln City F.C. adopted a team in the FA Women's National League. A link with a male club was necessary to meet the criteria for the new two tier FA WSL. Angry supporters in Lincoln compared the move to the 2003 relocation of Wimbledon F.C. to Milton Keynes.

=== Folding and relaunch of women's team ===
The club withdrew from the FA WSL 1, the top tier in the English women's football league system, two days before the start of the FA WSL Spring Series on 21 April 2017. The club created a new women's team for the 2018–19 season as Notts County Women F.C.

=== Colours and badge ===
The playing colours of Notts County Ladies FC were black and white striped shirts and white shorts. The club also used the same badge as their affiliate club.

=== Stadia ===
The rebranding to Notts County for the 2014 season entailed a relocation to Meadow Lane, Nottingham.

== Former players ==
For details of former players, see Category:Notts County L.F.C. players.

=== Managerial statistics ===
Name	Nat	From	To	Record				
Name	Nat	From	To	P	W	D	L	Win %
Rick Passmoor	(England)	2014	2017	25	10	9	6	40.00

== Honours ==
- Women's FA Cup: Runners-up 2014–15
- FA WSL Cup: Runners-up 2015

As Lincoln Ladies F.C.:

- FA WSL Cup: Runners-up 2013
- FA Women's Premier League Northern Division Runners-up (4): 2006–07, 2007–08, 2008–09, 2009–10
- Lincolnshire FA County Cup (7): 2002–03, 2003–04, 2004–05, 2005–06, 2006–07, 2008–09, 2009–10

== See also ==
- List of women's association football clubs in England and Wales
- Women's football in England
- List of women's association football clubs
