= 2013 Arsenal L.F.C. season =

English women's football club season

Arsenal Ladies
2013 season
- Chairman: Peter Hill-Wood; Sir Chips Keswick
- Manager: Laura Harvey (Until 22 December 2012); Shelley Kerr (From 1 February 2013)
- Stadium: Meadow Park; Emirates Stadium (Select home games)
- WSL: Third
- FA Cup: Winners
- WSL Cup: Winners
- Champions League: Semi-finals
- Top goalscorer: League: Jordan Nobbs (6); Danielle Carter (6); All: Ellen White (14)
- Highest home attendance: 2,017 (vs Liverpool, 7 May 2013)
- Biggest win: 7–0 (vs Nottingham Forest (A), FA Cup, 31 March 2013)
- Biggest defeat: 0–4 (vs Liverpool Women (H), WSL, 7 May 2013)
Home colours	Away colours	Third colours

2013 Arsenal L.F.C. season
Home colours	Away colours

The 2013 season was Arsenal Ladies Football Club's 26th season since forming in 1987. The club participated in the third edition of the FA WSL, England's top flight for women's football since 2011. Arsenal also played in the FA Women's Cup, and the FA WSL Cup, winning the former against Bristol Academy in June and the latter against Lincoln in October. They also competed in the UEFA Women's Champions League, losing at the Semi Final stage to Wolfsburg. In December 2012, manager Laura Harvey left Arsenal to take charge of Seattle Reign. In February 2013, Shelley Kerr was appointed to manage Arsenal ahead of the new WSL season. In September 2013, Arsenal were charged with playing an unregistered player in their trip to Liverpool. The resulting three point deduction saw them fall to third place and miss out on qualifying for Europe in the 2014–15 season.

As this season bridged the gap between the Men's Team's 2012–13 and 2013–14 seasons, the team wore two different sets of kits during each half of the season.

== Squad information & statistics ==
=== First team squad ===
Squad statistics correct as of May 2018

Squad No.	Name	Date of birth (age)	Since	Last Contract	Signed from
Goalkeepers
1	(Republic of Ireland) Emma Byrne	14 June 1979 (aged 34)	2000		(Denmark) Fortuna Hjørring
13	(Jamaica) Rebecca Spencer	22 February 1991 (aged 22)	2013		(England) Birmingham City
28/33	(England) Cherie Rowlands	11 October 1988 (aged 24)	2013		(England) Barnet
31	(England) Sophie Harris	25 August 1994 (aged 19)	2010		(England) Lincoln City
Defenders
2	(England) Steph Houghton	23 April 1988 (aged 25)	2010	August 2010	(England) Leeds Carnegie
3	(Republic of Ireland) Yvonne Tracy	27 February 1981 (aged 32)	2000		(Republic of Ireland) St Patrick's Athletic
5	(England) Gilly Flaherty	24 August 1991 (aged 22)	2006		(England) Arsenal Academy
18	(Scotland) Emma Mitchell	19 September 1992 (aged 21)	2013	July 2013	(Germany) SGS Essen
19	(Republic of Ireland) Niamh Fahey	13 October 1987 (aged 25)	2008		(Republic of Ireland) Salthill Devon
22	(England) Alex Scott	14 October 1984 (aged 28)	2012	March 2012	(United States) Boston Breakers
25	(England) Jade Bailey	11 November 1995 (aged 17)	2013		(England) Arsenal Academy
32	(England) Molly Bartrip	1 June 1996 (aged 17)	2013		(England) Arsenal Academy
34	(Jamaica) Vyan Sampson	2 July 1996 (aged 17)	2013		(England) Arsenal Academy
	(Germany) Anne Meiwald	15 March 1995 (aged 18)	2013		(England) Arsenal Academy
Midfielders
4	(Wales) Jayne Ludlow (c)	7 January 1979 (aged 34)	2000		(England) Southampton Saints
7	(Republic of Ireland) Ciara Grant	17 May 1978 (aged 35)	1998		(Republic of Ireland) St Patrick's Athletic
8	(England) Jordan Nobbs	8 December 1992 (aged 20)	2010	August 2010	(England) Sunderland
16	(Scotland) Kim Little	26 September 1990 (aged 23)	2008		(Scotland) Hibernian
17	(England) Katie Chapman	15 June 1982 (aged 31)	2010		(United States) Chicago Red Stars
20	(Scotland) Caroline Weir	20 June 1995 (aged 18)	2013	July 2013	(Scotland) Hibernian
26/24	(Ghana) Freda Ayisi	12 October 1994 (aged 18)	2013		(England) Arsenal Academy
30	(England) Bianca Bragg	14 January 1994 (aged 19)	2011		(England) Arsenal Academy
35	(England) Carla Humphrey	15 December 1996 (aged 16)	2013		(England) Arsenal Academy
36	(England) Frances Steele	2 October 1996 (aged 16)	2013		(England) Arsenal Academy
Forwards
9	(England) Ellen White	9 May 1989 (aged 24)	2010		(England) Leeds Carnegie
11	(England) Rachel Yankey	1 November 1979 (aged 33)	2005		(United States) New Jersey Wildcats
12	(England) Gemma Davison	17 April 1987 (aged 26)	2012		(United States) Sky Blue FC
14	(Scotland) Jen Beattie	13 May 1991 (aged 22)	2009		(Scotland) Celtic
15	(England) Danielle Carter	18 May 1993 (aged 20)	2009		(England) Arsenal Academy
23	(England) Kelly Smith	29 October 1978 (aged 34)	2012	March 2012	(United States) Boston Breakers
24	(England) Lauren Bruton	22 November 1992 (aged 20)	2008		(England) Arsenal Academy

=== Appearances and goals ===
No.	Name	WSL		FA Cup		WSL Cup		UWCL		Total	
No.	Name	Apps	Goals	Apps	Goals	Apps	Goals	Apps	Goals	Apps	Goals
Goalkeepers
1	(Republic of Ireland) Emma Byrne	11	0	3	0	4	0	8	0	26	0
13	(Jamaica) Rebecca Spencer	0	0	1	0	1	0	0	0	2	0
28	(England) Cherie Rowlands	2	0	0	0	0	0	0	0	2	0
31	(England) Sophie Harris	0	0	0	0	0	0	0	0	0	0
Defenders
2	(England) Steph Houghton	13	5	4	2	5	1	8	0	30	8
3	(Republic of Ireland) Yvonne Tracy	1	0	1+1	0	1	0	1	0	4+1	0
5	(England) Gilly Flaherty	12	3	3	0	4	0	7	0	26	3
18	(Scotland) Emma Mitchell	8	0	0	0	2	0	0	0	10	0
19	(Republic of Ireland) Niamh Fahey	0	0	3	0	1	0	5+1	1	9+1	1
22	(England) Alex Scott	14	2	4	0	5	0	8	0	31	2
25	(England) Jade Bailey	2+2	0	0+1	0	1	0	0	0	3+3	0
32	(England) Molly Bartrip	0	0	0	0	0	0	0	0	0	0
34	(Jamaica) Vyan Sampson	0	0	0	0	0	0	0	0	0	0
	(Germany) Anne Meiwald	0	0	0	0	0	0	0	0	0	0
Midfielders
4	(Wales) Jayne Ludlow (c)	0	0	1+1	1	0+1	0	0+2	0	1+3	1
7	(Republic of Ireland) Ciara Grant	7+2	0	3	0	3	0	5+1	0	18+3	0
8	(England) Jordan Nobbs	14	6	4	3	5	2	8	2	31	13
16	(Scotland) Kim Little	14	3	3	2	5	2	8	3	30	10
17	(England) Katie Chapman	7+2	0	0	0	1+1	0	4	2	12+3	2
20	(Scotland) Caroline Weir	2+5	0	0	0	0+1	0	0	0	2+6	0
26	(Ghana) Freda Ayisi	0+5	0	0	0	0	0	0	0	0+5	0
30	(England) Bianca Bragg	0	0	0	0	0	0	0	0	0	0
35	(England) Carla Humphrey	0	0	0	0	0	0	0	0	0	0
36	(England) Frances Steele	0	0	0	0	0	0	0	0	0	0
Forwards
9	(England) Ellen White	13+1	2	4	5	5	5	5+3	2	27+4	14
11	(England) Rachel Yankey	6+3	2	4	0	2+1	0	4	0	16+4	2
12	(England) Gemma Davison	12+2	2	3+1	2	3+2	1	6+2	0	24+7	5
14	(Scotland) Jen Beattie	4	0	2+1	1	2	0	3+5	4	11+6	5
15	(England) Danielle Carter	11+2	6	1+3	2	5	2	0+6	0	17+11	10
23	(England) Kelly Smith	0	0	0	0	0	0	4	4	4	4
24	(England) Lauren Bruton	0	0	0	0	0+1	0	0	0	0+1	0

=== Goalscorers ===
Rank	No.	Position	Name	WSL	FA Cup	WSL Cup	UWCL	Total
1	9	FW	(England) Ellen White	2	5	5	2	14
2	8	MF	(England) Jordan Nobbs	6	3	2	2	13
3	15	FW	(England) Danielle Carter	6	2	2	0	10
3	16	MF	(Scotland) Kim Little	3	2	2	3	10
5	2	DF	(England) Steph Houghton	5	2	1	0	8
6	12	FW	(England) Gemma Davison	2	2	1	0	5
6	14	FW	(Scotland) Jen Beattie	0	1	0	4	5
8	23	FW	(England) Kelly Smith	0	0	0	4	4
9	5	DF	(England) Gilly Flaherty	3	0	0	0	3
10	11	FW	(England) Rachel Yankey	2	0	0	0	2
10	17	MF	(England) Katie Chapman	0	0	0	0	2
10	22	DF	(England) Alex Scott	2	0	0	0	2
13	4	MF	(Wales) Jayne Ludlow (c)	0	1	0	0	1
13	19	DF	(Republic of Ireland) Niamh Fahey	0	0	0	1	1
Total				31	18	13	16	80

=== Disciplinary record ===
Rank	No.	Position	Name	WSL		FA Cup		WSL Cup		UWCL		Total	
Rank	No.	Position	Name	Booked	Sent off (straight red)	Booked	Sent off (straight red)	Booked	Sent off (straight red)	Booked	Sent off (straight red)	Booked	Sent off (straight red)
1	18	DF	(Scotland) Emma Mitchell	0	1	0	0	0	0	0	0	0	1
2	11	FW	(England) Rachel Yankey	1	0	0	0	0	0	1	0	2	0
2	16	MF	(Scotland) Kim Little	0	0	0	0	0	0	2	0	2	0
2	5	DF	(England) Gilly Flaherty	1	0	0	0	0	0	1	0	2	0
5	15	FW	(England) Danielle Carter	1	0	0	0	0	0	0	0	1	0
5	12	FW	(England) Gemma Davison	1	0	0	0	0	0	0	0	1	0
5	7	MF	(Republic of Ireland) Ciara Grant	0	0	0	0	0	0	1	0	1	0
5	3	DF	(Republic of Ireland) Yvonne Tracy	0	0	0	0	0	0	1	0	1	0
5	2	DF	(England) Steph Houghton	0	0	0	0	0	0	1	0	1	0
Total				4	1	0	0	0	0	7	0	11	1

=== Clean sheets ===
Rank	No.	Name	WSL	FA Cup	WSL Cup	UWCL	Total
1	1	(Republic of Ireland) Emma Byrne	6	2	2	3	13
2	28	(England) Cherie Rowlands	2	0	0	0	2
3	13	(Jamaica) Rebecca Spencer	0	1	0	0	1
Total			8	3	2	3	16

== Transfers, loans and other signings ==
=== Transfers in ===
Announcement date	No.	Position	Player	From club
2013	13	GK	(Jamaica) Rebecca Spencer	(England) Birmingham City
22 July 2013	18	DF	(Scotland) Emma Mitchell	(Germany) SGS Essen
22 July 2013	20	MF	(Scotland) Caroline Weir	(Scotland) Hibernian

=== Loans in ===
Announcement date	No.	Position	Player	From club
2013	28	GK	(England) Cherie Rowlands	(England) Barnet

=== Transfers out ===
Announcement date	No.	Position	Player	To club
October 2012	25	MF	(Wales) Hayley Ladd	(England) Coventry City
20 March 2013	6	DF	(England) Faye White	Retired
17 June 2013	35	GK	(Northern Ireland) Nicole Adams	(Northern Ireland) Linfield
July 2013		DF	(Germany) Anne Meiwald	(England) Chelsea
11 July 2013	4	MF	(Wales) Jayne Ludlow	Retired
16 July 2013	13	GK	(Jamaica) Rebecca Spencer	(England) Birmingham City
16 July 2013	14	FW	(Scotland) Jen Beattie	(France) Montpellier HSC
11 September 2013	24	FW	(England) Lauren Bruton	(England) Reading

=== Loans out ===
Announcement date	No.	Position	Player	To club
2013	31	GK	(England) Sophie Harris	(England) Nottingham Forest

== Club ==
=== Kit (2012-13) ===
Supplier: Nike / Sponsor: Fly Emirates

Home	Away	Third	Goalkeeper 1	Goalkeeper 2	Goalkeeper 2 alt.	Goalkeeper 3	Goalkeeper 3 alt.

=== Kit information ===
Nike released a new set of home, away and goalkeeper kits for the 2012–13 season. The club reverted to their traditional crest, after using an anniversary crest last season.

- Home: During the final two years with Nike, Nike ditched the white sleeves the club's well known for. The shirt has a white wide stripe on each sleeve, flanked by two dark red, narrower stripes. It has a red V-neck collar which is the same colour as the primary shirt colour. The shirt is complemented by white shorts with a dark-red trim, and white socks with a red horizontal stripe. Red socks with white horizontal stripe were used in some away games. Arsenal revealed that the kit would be used for the next two seasons.
- Away: Arsenal's new away kit, was revealed on 12 July 2012, with the much speculated purple and black hooped kit being officially confirmed. The reason behind the kit was to commemorate Arsenal's past, enhancing the "royal" theme from the Diamond Jubilee to remind Arsenal fans of the Royal Arsenal that once existed through the colour purple. The shirt featured red cuffs and detailing, and additionally featured hoops of different width on the arms. The purple and black hooped socks, bearing one red stripe each, paid tribute to Chapman's legacy and his introduction of hooped socks, which according to him, was said to make it easier for his players to pick each other out on the pitch.
- Third: Arsenal's yellow and maroon 2010–11 away kit was retained as a third kit yet again with club badge reverted to traditional badge after last season with anniversary badge.
- Keeper: Nike launched a new set of goalkeeper strips for the 2012–13 season. The primary strip was predominantly green featuring several tones of the same colour on the arms. The alternatives were pink and gold, based on the same template.

==== Kit usage (2012-13) ====
Kit	Combination	Usage	
Home	Red body; White sleeves; White shorts; White socks	WSL	Liverpool (H); Lincoln (A); Chelsea (H)
Home	Red body; White sleeves; White shorts; White socks	FA Cup	Birmingham City (H)
Home	Red body; White sleeves; White shorts; White socks	WSL Cup	Lincoln (H); Birmingham City (H); Bristol Academy (H)
Home	Red body; White sleeves; White shorts; White socks	UWCL	Barcelona (A); Barcelona (H); Turbine Potsdam (H); Turbine Potsdam (A); Wolfsburg (H); Wolfsburg (A)
Away	Purple and black hooped body; Purple and black hooped sleeves; Black shorts; Red socks	WSL	Bristol Academy (A)
Away	Purple and black hooped body; Purple and black hooped sleeves; Black shorts; Red socks	FA Cup	Nottingham Forest (A); Bristol Academy (N)
Away	Purple and black hooped body; Purple and black hooped sleeves; Black shorts; Red socks	UWCL	Torres (H); Torres (A)
Third	Yellow body; Yellow sleeves; Maroon shorts; Yellow socks	FA Cup	Liverpool (A)

=== Kit (2013-14) ===
Supplier: Nike / Sponsor: Fly Emirates

Home	Away	Goalkeeper 1	Goalkeeper 2	Goalkeeper 3	Goalkeeper 4

==== Kit information ====
Nike supplied their last kit for Arsenal this season, which saw an end to 20 years of contract. Puma became the club's new supplier kit for next season.

- Home: The home kit from last season was unchanged. As usual, Arsenal switched to red socks in an event of a socks clashes in some away games.
- Away: The away kit used the traditional Arsenal colours of yellow and blue. The design appealed to a lot of fans. The kit was yellow with a blue polo neck collar and deep blue cuffs on the sleeves, both featuring thin yellow stripes. The away shorts were blue while the away socks featured the traditional Arsenal hoops socks design in blue and yellow, harking back to the style of those worn in the 1930s under the management of Herbert Chapman.
- Keeper: There were four goalkeeper kits, and all of them were all based on Nike's two-tone goalkeeper template. The home kit was grey and black with lime green accents. The away kit was in two shades of purple, while the third kit was in two tones of light green and was the most commonly worn strip.

==== Kit usage (2013-14) ====
Kit	Combination		Usage
Home	Red body; White sleeves; White shorts; White socks.	WSL	Everton (H); Birmingham City (A); Chelsea (A); Doncaster Rovers Belles (H); Lincoln (H); Bristol Academy (H); Birmingham City (H); Everton (A)
Home	Red body; White sleeves; White shorts; White socks.	WSL Cup	Everton (H)
Away	Yellow body; Yellow sleeves; Blue shorts; Hooped socks.	WSL	Liverpool (A); Doncaster Rovers Belles (A)

== Pre-season ==
20 February 2013	Colchester United	0–6	Arsenal	Wivenhoe
19:45 GMT		Report	Little 6' (pen.), 61'; Houghton 25'; Yankey 30'; Carter 75', 83'	Stadium: Broad Lane

24 February 2013	Glasgow City	0–5	Arsenal	Glasgow
14:00 GMT		Report	Little 4' (pen.); Nobbs 10'; White 21'; Yankey 36'; Dalziel 75' (o.g.)	Stadium: Petershill Park

== Competitions ==
=== Overall record ===
Competition	First match	Last match	Starting round	Final position	Record							
Competition	First match	Last match	Starting round	Final position	Pld	W	D	L	GF	GA	GD	Win %
FA WSL	7 May 2013	29 September 2013	Matchday 1	3rd	14	10	3	1	31	11	+20	71.43
FA Women's Cup	31 March 2013	26 May 2013	Fifth round	Winners	4	4	0	0	18	1	+17	100.00
FA WSL Cup	2 May 2013	4 October 2013	Group stage	Winners	5	4	1	0	14	4	+10	80.00
UEFA Women's Champions League	26 September 2012	21 April 2013	Round of 32	Semi-finals	8	6	0	2	18	9	+9	75.00
Total					31	24	4	3	81	25	+56	77.42

Source: FA WSL

=== FA WSL ===
==== Partial league table ====
Pos	Team	Pld	W	D	L	GF	GA	GD	Pts	Qualification or relegation
1	Liverpool (C)	14	12	0	2	46	19	+27	36	Qualification for the Champions League knockout phase
2	Bristol Academy	14	10	1	3	30	20	+10	31	Qualification for the Champions League knockout phase
3	Arsenal (Note: Arsenal were deducted 3 points for fielding an unregistered player)	14	10	3	1	31	11	+20	30	
4	Birmingham City	14	5	3	6	16	21	−5	18	
5	Everton	14	4	3	7	23	30	−7	15	

Source: FA WSL
Rules for classification: 1) Points; 2) Goal difference; 3) Number of goals scored
(C) Champions

==== Results summary ====
Overall								Home						Away					
Pld	W	D	L	GF	GA	GD	Pts	W	D	L	GF	GA	GD	W	D	L	GF	GA	GD
14	10	3	1	31	11	+20	30	4	2	1	12	6	+6	6	1	0	19	5	+14

==== Results by matchday ====
Matchday	1	2	3	4	5	6	7	8	9	10	11	12	13	14
Ground	H	A	A	H	A	H	A	A	A	H	H	H	H	A
Result	L	D	W	W	W	W	W	W	W	W	D	D	W	W
Position	6	7	6	3	3	3	3	2	2	2	2	2	3	3

Updated to match(es) played on 20 May 2018. Source: FA WSL
W = Win; D = Draw; L = Loss

==== Matches ====
7 May 2013 1	Arsenal	0–4	Liverpool	Holloway
19:00 BST	Carter (yellow card) 10'	Report	DaCosta 37', 53'; Dowie 57'; Fors 58'	Stadium: Emirates Stadium; Attendance: 2,017; Referee: Sasa Ihringova

15 May 2013 2	Lincoln	1–1	Arsenal	Lincoln
19:30 BST	Roberts 89'; Stoney (yellow card) 90+3'	Report	Houghton 90'	Stadium: Sincil Bank; Attendance: 389; Referee: Ian Dudley

30 May 2013 3	Bristol Academy	2–3	Arsenal	Stoke Gifford
19:00 BST	Natalia 47'; McCatty (yellow card) 63' (yellow-red card) 76'; Yorston 79' (pen.)	Report	Houghton 32'; Little 42' (penalty missed) 76'; Flaherty 51'; Yankey (yellow card) 63'	Stadium: Stoke Gifford Stadium; Attendance: 1,064; Referee: Robin Cox

6 June 2013 4	Arsenal	2–1	Chelsea	Borehamwood
19:45 BST	Flaherty 23'; A. Scott 60'	Report	Vidarsdottir (yellow card) 52'; Aluko 63'; Longhurst (yellow card) 89'	Stadium: Meadow Park; Attendance: 1,113; Referee: Dean Treleaven

3 August 2013 5	Liverpool	0–3	Arsenal	Widnes
19:00 BST	Dowie (penalty missed) 65'	Report	Nobbs 9', 74'; A. Scott 35'; Davison (yellow card) 57'; Flaherty (yellow card) 68'	Stadium: Halton Stadium; Attendance: 746; Referee: John Brooks

11 August 2013 6	Arsenal	5–0	Everton	Borehamwood
14:00 BST	Carter 5', 29'; Little 22' (pen.); Davison 53'; Nobbs 67'	Report		Stadium: Meadow Park; Attendance: 629; Referee: Ashvin Degnarain

18 August 2013 7	Birmingham City	1–3	Arsenal	Tiddington
14:00 BST	Potter 54'; Moore (yellow card) 69'	Report	Houghton 7'; White 19'; Davison 39'; Flaherty (yellow card) 66'	Stadium: Knights Lane; Attendance: 561; Referee: Shaun Barry

21 August 2013 8	Doncaster Rovers Belles	0–6	Arsenal	Doncaster
19:45 BST		Report	Flaherty 29'; Nobbs 31'; Carter 32', 73'; White 67'; Houghton 77'	Stadium: Keepmoat Stadium; Attendance: 320; Referee: Nicholas Hopton

29 August 2013 9	Chelsea	0–1	Arsenal	Staines
19:30 BST	Aluko (yellow card) 66'	Report	Carter 29'	Stadium: Wheatsheaf Park; Attendance: 1,074; Referee: John Busby

1 September 2013 10	Arsenal	3–1	Doncaster Rovers Belles	Borehamwood
14:00 BST	Carter 35'; Little 53' (pen.); Nobbs 70'	Report	S. Smith 47'	Stadium: Meadow Park; Attendance: 406

5 September 2013 11	Arsenal	0–0	Lincoln	Borehamwood
14:00 BST		Report	Turner (yellow card) 83'	Stadium: Meadow Park; Attendance: 467; Referee: Stuart Cheek

8 September 2013 12	Arsenal	0–0	Bristol Academy	Borehamwood
14:00 BST		Report	Windell (yellow card) 88'	Stadium: Meadow Park; Attendance: 602; Referee: Paul Howard

15 September 2013 13	Arsenal	2–0	Birmingham City	Borehamwood
14:00 BST	Nobbs 3'; Yankey 58'; Mitchell (red card) 73'	Report	Christiansen (penalty missed) 73'	Stadium: Meadow Park; Attendance: 412; Referee: Stuart Franklin

29 September 2013 14	Everton	1–2	Arsenal	Crosby
14:00 BST	Duggan 34'; Jones (yellow card) 41'	Report	White 66'; Yankey 81'	Stadium: Rossett Park; Attendance: 752; Referee: Helen Byrne

=== FA Women's Cup ===
31 March 2013 Fifth round	Nottingham Forest	0–7	Arsenal	Gedling
14:00 BST		Report	Carter 20', 89'; Beattie 25'; Ludlow 30'; White 35'; Nobbs 40'; Houghton 45'	Stadium: Bill Stokeld Stadium

9 April 2013 Quarter-finals	Arsenal	6–0	Birmingham City	Bishop's Stortford
14:00 BST	Davison 10', 75'; Nobbs 30'; White 43', 52'; Little 55'	Report		Stadium: Woodside Park; Attendance: 520
Note: Note: Game was moved from Meadow Park due to renovation work.

26 April 2013 Semi-finals	Liverpool	1–2	Arsenal	Liverpool
19:00 BST	Dowie 45'	Report	White 25'; Little 53'	Stadium: Anfield; Attendance: 2,008; Referee: Nathan Walker

26 May 2013 Final	Arsenal	3–0	Bristol Academy	Doncaster
15:00 BST	Houghton 2'; Nobbs 72'; White 90+4'	Report		Stadium: Keepmoat Stadium; Attendance: 4,988; Referee: Jane Simms

=== FA WSL Cup ===
==== Group stage ====
Pos	Team	Pld	W	D	L	GF	GA	GD	Pts	Qualification	ARS	LIN	BIR	BRI
1	Arsenal	3	2	1	0	7	4	+3	7	Advance to knock-out stage	—	—	2–1	4–2
2	Lincoln	3	1	2	0	3	2	+1	5	Advance to knock-out stage	1–1	—	—	—
3	Birmingham City	3	1	1	1	4	3	+1	4		—	1–1	—	—
4	Bristol Academy	3	0	0	3	2	7	−5	0		—	0–1	0–2	—

2 May 2013 1	Lincoln	1–1	Arsenal	Lincoln
19:30 BST	Clarke 23'	Report	White 82'	Stadium: Sincil Bank; Attendance: 283; Referee: Stuart Richardson

11 May 2013 2	Arsenal	2–1	Birmingham City	Borehamwood
13:00 BST	Davison 51'; White 88'	Report	Williams 48' (pen.); Linnett (yellow card) 86'	Stadium: Meadow Park; Referee: Adam Crysell

19 September 2013 3	Arsenal	4–2	Bristol Academy	Borehamwood
14:00 BST	White 25'; Nobbs 49'; Carter 54'; Little 85'	Report	Watts 27'; Curson 42' (yellow card) 75'	Stadium: Meadow Park; Attendance: 446; Referee: Anthony Da Costa

==== Knockout stage ====
8 August 2013 Semi-finals	Arsenal	4–0	Everton	Borehamwood
19:45 BST	Nobbs 8'; Carter 35'; White 40'; Houghton 56'	Report		Stadium: Meadow Park; Attendance: 629; Referee: Ashvin Degnarain

4 October 2013 Final	Arsenal	2–0	Lincoln	Canons Park
19:30 BST	White 76'; Little 86'	Report	Clarke (yellow card) 62'	Stadium: The Hive; Attendance: 3,421; Referee: Lisa Rashid

=== UEFA Women's Champions League ===
==== Knockout phase ====
===== Round of 32 =====
26 September 2012 First leg	Barcelona (Spain)	0–3	(England) Arsenal	Barcelona
19:00 BST		Report	Beattie 31'; Nobbs 55'; Chapman 67'	Stadium: Mini Estadi; Attendance: 1,354; Referee: Christine Baitinger (Germany)

4 October 2012 Second leg	Arsenal (England)	4–0 (7–0 agg.)	(Spain) Barcelona	Borehamwood
15:00 BST	Tracy (yellow card) 41'; Beattie 53', 78', 90+3' (pen.); Little (yellow card) 55' (goal) 57'; Yankey (yellow card) 88'	Report	Rafols (yellow card) 90'	Stadium: Meadow Park; Attendance: 662; Referee: Lilach Asulin (Israel)

===== Round of 16 =====
1 November 2012 First leg	Arsenal (England)	2–1	(Germany) Turbine Potsdam	Borehamwood
15:00 GMT	Chapman 70'; White 82'	Report	Goransson (yellow card) 45'; Hanebeck (yellow card) 72'; Ōgimi 89'	Stadium: Meadow Park, Attendance: 832; Referee: Esther Azzopardi (Malta)

7 November 2012 Second leg	Turbine Potsdam (Germany)	3–4 (4–6 agg.)	(England) Arsenal	Potsdam
18:00 GMT	Göransson 48', 59'; Winters 55'	Report	K. Smith 27', 34', 57'; Houghton (yellow card) 67'; White 81'	Stadium: Karl-Liebknecht-Stadion; Attendance: 3,260; Referee: Carina Vitulano (Italy)

===== Quarter-finals =====
20 March 2013 First leg	Arsenal (England)	3–1	(Italy) Torres	Borehamwood
15:00 GMT	K. Smith 23'; Nobbs 49'; Little 63'; Grant (yellow card) 80'	Report	Piacezzi (yellow card) 38'; Maendly 71'; Bartoli (yellow card) 80'	Stadium: Meadow Park; Attendance: 600; Referee: Bibiana Steinhaus (Germany)

27 March 2013 Second leg	Torres (Italy)	0–1 (1–4 agg.)	(England) Arsenal	Sassari
14:30 BST		Report	Fahey 4'	Stadium: Stadio Vanni Sanna; Attendance: 3,150; Referee: Teodora Albon (Romania)

===== Semi-finals =====
14 April 2013 First leg	Arsenal (England)	0–2	(Germany) Wolfsburg	Borehamwood
15:00 BST		Report	Pohlers 29'; Popp (yellow card) 60'; Müller 85'	Stadium: Meadow Park; Attendance: 1,406; Referee: Kateryna Monzul (Ukraine)

21 April 2013 Second leg	Wolfsburg (Germany)	2–1 (4–1 agg.)	(England) Arsenal	Wolfsburg
12:00 BST	Wagner 14'; Keßler (penalty missed) 61' 61'; Odebrecht (yellow card) 73'	Report	Flaherty (yellow card) 42'; Little 54' (yellow card) 61'	Stadium: Volkswagen Arena; Attendance: 8,173; Referee: Silvia Tea Spinelli (Italy)

== See also ==
- List of Arsenal W.F.C. seasons
- 2012–13 in English football
- 2013–14 in English football
