= 2012–13 UEFA Women's Champions League qualifying round =

Tournament details
- Dates: 11–16 August 2012
- Teams: 32

The 2012–13 UEFA Women's Champions League qualifying round was played on 11, 13 and 16 August 2012. A total of 32 teams competed in the qualifying round to decide 10 of the 32 places in the knockout phase of the 2012–13 UEFA Women's Champions League

32 teams entered in the qualifying round, and were divided into eight groups of four teams, with one team from each seeding pot. The group-winners and best two runners-up qualify for the round of 32.:

Pot 1

- (Scotland) Glasgow City
- (Poland) Unia Racibórz
- (Greece) PAOK
- (Switzerland) Zürich
- (Cyprus) Apollon Limassol (host)
- (Portugal) 1° Dezembro
- (Bosnia and Herzegovina) SFK 2000 (host)
- (Bulgaria) NSA Sofia

Pot 2

- (Hungary) MTK
- (Ukraine) Zhytlobud-1 Kharkiv
- (Belarus) Bobruichanka
- (Lithuania) Gintra Universitetas
- (Finland) PK-35 Vantaa (host)
- (Israel) ASA Tel Aviv University
- (Romania) Olimpia Cluj
- (Kazakhstan) BIIK Kazygurt

Pot 3

- (Croatia) Osijek
- (Faroe Islands) KÍ Klaksvík
- (Serbia) Spartak Subotica (host)
- (Republic of Ireland) Peamount United
- (Slovakia) Slovan Bratislava (host)
- (North Macedonia) Naše Taksi (host)
- (Northern Ireland) Glentoran Belfast United
- (Slovenia) Pomurje (host)

Pot 4

- (Estonia) Pärnu JK
- (Turkey) Ataşehir Belediyesi
- (Wales) Cardiff Met.
- (Moldova) FC Noroc
- (Albania) Ada
- (Malta) Birkirkara (host)
- (Latvia) Skonto/Cerība
- (Montenegro) Ekonomist

The eight hosts were confirmed by UEFA before the draw, and two hosts could not be placed in the same group. Each team played the other teams in the group once. The matches were played between 11 and 16 August 2012. The draw was held on 28 June 2012.

== Tie-breaker criteria ==
As usual in UEFA competitions, three points are awarded for a win, and one point for a draw. If teams are equal on points after all matches have been played, the following criteria applies:

1. Higher number of points obtained in the matches among the teams in question.
2. Superior goal difference resulting from the matches among the teams in question.
3. Higher number of goals scored in the matches among the teams in question.
4. Superior goal difference in all group matches
5. Higher number of goals scored in all group matches
6. Higher number of club coefficient points
7. Drawing of lots

Criteria 1–3 are reapplied until the tie cannot be resolved; only then is criteria 4 used.

== Groups ==
=== Group 1 ===
Pos	Team	Pld	W	D	L	GF	GA	GD	Pts	Qualification	ZUR	POM	ABE	GIN
1	(Switzerland) Zürich	3	3	0	0	14	0	+14	9	Advance to main round	—	2–0	4–0	–
2	(Slovenia) Pomurje (H)	3	2	0	1	13	5	+8	6		–	—	–	9–1
3	(Turkey) Ataşehir Belediyesi	3	1	0	2	5	10	−5	3		–	2–4	—	–
4	(Lithuania) Gintra Universitetas	3	0	0	3	3	20	−17	0		0–8	–	2–3	—

(H) Hosts
11 August 2012
17:00

Zürich (Switzerland)	2–0	(Slovenia) Pomurje
Deplazes 13'; Grings 71'	Report

Beltinci Sports Park, Beltinci
Referee: Kateryna Monzul (Ukraine)
11 August 2012
20:00

Gintra Universitetas (Lithuania)	2–3	(Turkey) Ataşehir Belediyesi
Möller 26'; Neverdauskaite 36'	Report	Matveeva 44', 55'; Aladağ 75'

Lendava Sports Park, Lendava
Referee: Sofia Karagiorgi (Cyprus)

13 August 2012
17:00

Zürich (Switzerland)	4–0	(Turkey) Ataşehir Belediyesi
Zürcher 29'; Humm 40'; Grings 49', 80'	Report

Beltinci Sports Park, Beltinci
Referee: Sofia Karagiorgi (Cyprus)
13 August 2012
20:00

Pomurje (Slovenia)	9–1	(Lithuania) Gintra Universitetas
Eržen 31', 45+2', 70'; Benak 45'; Rogan 48', 66' (pen.); Zver 62', 72', 78'	Report	O. Imanalijeva 58'

Lendava Sports Park, Lendava
Referee: Amy Rayner (England)

16 August 2012
17:00

Gintra Universitetas (Lithuania)	0–8	(Switzerland) Zürich
	Report	Zumbühl 21', 79'; Deplazes 36'; Brandenberger 58'; Terchoun 60'; Zürcher 83'; Kiwic 85'; Weber 90+1'

Lendava Sports Park, Lendava
Referee: Kateryna Monzul (Ukraine)
16 August 2012
17:00

Ataşehir Belediyesi (Turkey)	2–4	(Slovenia) Pomurje
Uraz 25' Ebi 52'	Report	Prša 21'; Tibaut 23', 89'; Rogan 28'

Beltinci Sports Park, Beltinci
Referee: Amy Rayner (England)

=== Group 2 ===
Pos	Team	Pld	W	D	L	GF	GA	GD	Pts	Qualification	BKA	SUB	NSA	PAR
1	(Kazakhstan) BIIK Kazygurt	3	3	0	0	9	0	+9	9	Advance to main round	—	–	4–0	3–0
2	(Serbia) Spartak Subotica (H)	3	2	0	1	8	2	+6	6	Advance to main round	0–2	—	–	–
3	(Bulgaria) NSA Sofia	3	1	0	2	2	11	−9	3		–	0–7	—	2–0
4	(Estonia) Pärnu JK	3	0	0	3	0	6	−6	0		–	0–1	–	—

(H) Hosts
11 August 2012
15:00

BIIK Kazygurt (Kazakhstan)	3–0	(Estonia) Pärnu JK
Litvinenko 83' (pen.), 86', 90+2'	Report

Subotica City Stadium, Subotica
Referee: Stéphanie Frappart (France)
11 August 2012
17:30

NSA Sofia (Bulgaria)	0–7	(Serbia) Spartak Subotica
	Report	Tenkov 21', 27'; Radojičić 33', 35'; Čanković 61'; Ilić 70'; Razhgeva 79' (o.g.)

Subotica City Stadium, Subotica
Referee: Katalin Kulcsár (Hungary)

13 August 2012
15:00

NSA Sofia (Bulgaria)	2–0	(Estonia) Pärnu JK
Gospodinova 17'; Popadiynova 43'	Report

Subotica City Stadium, Subotica
Referee: Stéphanie Frappart (France)
13 August 2012
17:30

Spartak Subotica (Serbia)	0–2	(Kazakhstan) BIIK Kazygurt
	Report	Litvinenko 14'; Ogbiagbevha 53'

Subotica City Stadium, Subotica
Referee: Karolina Radzik-Johan (Poland)

16 August 2012
17:00

BIIK Kazygurt (Kazakhstan)	4–0	(Bulgaria) NSA Sofia
Litvinenko 2'; Zhanatayeva 44'; Ogbiagbevha 90'; Krstić 90+3'	Report

Subotica City Stadium, Subotica
Referee: Katalin Kulcsár (Hungary)
16 August 2012
17:00

Pärnu JK (Estonia)	0–1	(Serbia) Spartak Subotica
	Report	Slović 79'

Karađorđe Stadium, Novi Sad
Referee: Stéphanie Frappart (France)

=== Group 3 ===
Pos	Team	Pld	W	D	L	GF	GA	GD	Pts	Qualification	CLU	DEZ	GLE	BIR
1	(Romania) Olimpia Cluj	3	3	0	0	16	3	+13	9	Advance to main round	—	4–1	–	8–0
2	(Portugal) 1° Dezembro	3	2	0	1	6	4	+2	6		–	—	4–0	1–0
3	(Northern Ireland) Glentoran Belfast United	3	1	0	2	5	9	−4	3		2–4	–	—	–
4	(Malta) Birkirkara (H)	3	0	0	3	1	12	−11	0		–	–	1–3	—

(H) Hosts
11 August 2012
17:30

1° Dezembro (Portugal)	4–0	(Northern Ireland) Glentoran Belfast United
Silva 7'; Galvão 55'; Ventura 82'; Elvas 90+2'	Report

Centenary Stadium, Ta' Qali
Referee: Gordana Kuzmanovic (Serbia)
11 August 2012
20:00

Olimpia Cluj (Romania)	8–0	(Malta) Birkirkara
Duşa 9', 90' (pen.); Sârghe 15'; Lunca 20'; Voicu 22'; Bortan 38'; Vătafu 60', 82'	Report

Centenary Stadium, Ta' Qali
Referee: Marte Sørø (Norway)

13 August 2012
17:30

1° Dezembro (Portugal)	1–0	(Malta) Birkirkara
Silva 17'	Report

Centenary Stadium, Ta' Qali
Referee: Marte Sørø (Norway)
13 August 2012
20:00

Glentoran Belfast United (Northern Ireland)	2–4	(Romania) Olimpia Cluj
Burk 16'; Vance 74'	Report	Duşa 25', 76', 86'; Lunca 84'

Centenary Stadium, Ta' Qali
Referee: Riem Hussein (Germany)

16 August 2012
17:00

Olimpia Cluj (Romania)	4–1	(Portugal) 1° Dezembro
Duşa 22', 34', 70'; Lunca 59'	Report	Silva 21'

National Stadium, Ta' Qali
Referee: Gordana Kuzmanovic (Serbia)
16 August 2012
17:00

Birkirkara (Malta)	1–3	(Northern Ireland) Glentoran Belfast United
Feasey 90+2'	Report	Bailie 45+4'; McGuinness 72', 77'

Centenary Stadium, Ta' Qali
Referee: Riem Hussein (Germany)

=== Group 4 ===
Pos	Team	Pld	W	D	L	GF	GA	GD	Pts	Qualification	UNR	SBR	BOB	EKO
1	(Poland) Unia Racibórz	3	3	0	0	17	1	+16	9	Advance to main round	—	5–0	–	7–1
2	(Slovakia) Slovan Bratislava (H)	3	2	0	1	11	7	+4	6		–	—	3–2	–
3	(Belarus) Bobruichanka	3	1	0	2	7	9	−2	3		0–5	–	—	5–1
4	(Montenegro) Ekonomist	3	0	0	3	2	20	−18	0		–	0–8	–	—

(H) Hosts
11 August 2012
11:00

Unia Racibórz (Poland)	5–0	(Slovakia) Slovan Bratislava
Wiśniewska 5'; Chinasa 11', 54', 90'; Mika 85'	Report

Štadión Pasienky, Bratislava
Referee: Morag Pirie (Scotland)
11 August 2012
17:00

Bobruichanka (Belarus)	5–1	(Montenegro) Ekonomist
Buzunova 15'; Loginova 33', 78'; Sike 60'; Astashova 87'	Report	Djoković 24'

NTC Senec, Senec
Referee: Knarik Grigoryan (Armenia)

13 August 2012
11:00

Unia Racibórz (Poland)	7–1	(Montenegro) Ekonomist
Tarczyńska 18', 43'; Ištóková 20'; Chinasa 25', 58', 71'; Sýkorová 52'	Report	Krivokapić 89'

NTC Senec, Senec
Referee: Knarik Grigoryan (Armenia)
13 August 2012
17:00

Slovan Bratislava (Slovakia)	3–2	(Belarus) Bobruichanka
Ondrušová 39' (pen.); Fecková 63', 83'	Report	Mravíková 28' (o.g.); Buzinova 78'

Štadión Pasienky, Bratislava
Referee: Elia Martínez (Spain)

16 August 2012
17:00

Bobruichanka (Belarus)	0–5	(Poland) Unia Racibórz
	Report	Chinasa 17', 90+4'; Pożerska 25'; Tarczyńska 30'; Mika 43'

NTC Senec, Senec
Referee: Morag Pirie (Scotland)
16 August 2012
17:00

Ekonomist (Montenegro)	0–8	(Slovakia) Slovan Bratislava
	Report	Fecková 23', 59'; Fatulová 35'; Vargovčiková 45'; Cabarkapa 66' (o.g.); Balážiková 78'; Kujovičová 84'; Ondrušová 90+1'

Štadión Pasienky, Bratislava
Referee: Elia Martínez (Spain)

=== Group 5 ===
Pos	Team	Pld	W	D	L	GF	GA	GD	Pts	Qualification	SFK	PEA	ASA	CAR
1	(Bosnia and Herzegovina) SFK 2000 (H)	3	2	1	0	6	1	+5	7	Advance to main round	—	4–0	–	1–0
2	(Republic of Ireland) Peamount United	3	2	0	1	9	4	+5	6		–	—	5–0	–
3	(Israel) ASA Tel Aviv University	3	1	1	1	6	6	0	4		1–1	–	—	5–0
4	(Wales) Cardiff Met.	3	0	0	3	0	10	−10	0		–	0–4	–	—

(H) Hosts
11 August 2012
11:00

SFK 2000 (Bosnia and Herzegovina)	4–0	(Republic of Ireland) Peamount United
Šešlija 3'; Hadžić 30'; Fetahović 32', 43'	Report

Koševo City Stadium, Sarajevo
Referee: Sandra Braz Bastos (Portugal)
11 August 2012
17:30

ASA Tel Aviv University (Israel)	5–0	(Wales) Cardiff Met.
Falkon 1', 62'; Shenar 6', 50'; Friedman 31'	Report

Koševo City Stadium, Sarajevo
Referee: Anastasia Pustovoitova (Russia)

13 August 2012
11:00

Peamount United (Republic of Ireland)	5–0	(Israel) ASA Tel Aviv University
Russell 5'; Lawlor 41', 62', 90'; Roche 58'	Report

Koševo City Stadium, Sarajevo
Referee: Ausra Kance (Lithuania)
13 August 2012
17:30

SFK 2000 (Bosnia and Herzegovina)	1–0	(Wales) Cardiff Met.
Kršo 57'	Report

Koševo City Stadium, Sarajevo
Referee: Anastasia Pustovoitova (Russia)

16 August 2012
17:00

ASA Tel Aviv University (Israel)	1–1	(Bosnia and Herzegovina) SFK 2000
Shelina 50'	Report	Hadžić 6'

Koševo City Stadium, Sarajevo
Referee: Sandra Braz Bastos (Portugal)
16 August 2012
17:00

Cardiff Met. (Wales)	0–4	(Republic of Ireland) Peamount United
	Report	Roche 2', 58'; O'Sullivan 9'; Lawlor 48'

City Stadium SRC Slavija, Istočno Sarajevo
Referee: Ausra Kance (Lithuania)

=== Group 6 ===
Apollon's 21–0 victory over Ada set a new competition record.

Pos	Team	Pld	W	D	L	GF	GA	GD	Pts	Qualification	APL	KHA	KIK	ADA
1	(Cyprus) Apollon Limassol (H)	3	3	0	0	31	0	+31	9	Advance to main round	—	–	7–0	21–0
2	(Ukraine) Zhytlobud-1 Kharkiv	3	2	0	1	16	5	+11	6		0–3	—	–	14–1
3	(Faroe Islands) KÍ Klaksvík	3	1	0	2	12	10	+2	3		–	1–2	—	–
4	(Albania) Ada	3	0	0	3	2	46	−44	0		–	–	1–11	—

(H) Hosts
11 August 2012
17:00

Apollon Limassol (Cyprus)	7–0	(Faroe Islands) KÍ Klaksvík
Farrelly 16'; Rus 17', 74', 84'; Kostova 53', 62'; Iuşan 90'	Report

GSZ Stadium, Larnaca
Referee: Jana Adámková (Czech Republic)
11 August 2012
20:00

Zhytlobud-1 Kharkiv (Ukraine)	14–1	(Albania) Ada
Kostyuchenko 6', 65'; Shundrovska 9', 50'; Znaidzionava 11', 90'; Tatarinova 30', 52'; Basanska 37', 60'; Nesterenko 45+3', 62'; Ovdiychuk 67', 86'	Report	Baro 45+2'

GSZ Stadium, Larnaca
Referee: Linn Andersson (Sweden)

13 August 2012
17:00

KÍ Klaksvík (Faroe Islands)	1–2	(Ukraine) Zhytlobud-1 Kharkiv
Purkhús 29'	Report	Josephsen 66' (o.g.); Tykhonova 76'

GSZ Stadium, Larnaca
Referee: Rhona Daly (Ireland)
13 August 2012
20:00

Apollon Limassol (Cyprus)	21–0	(Albania) Ada
Kostova 3', 45+3' (pen.), 49', 59'; Rus 13', 25', 63', 65', 71'; Lazri 18' (o.g.); Farrelly 21', 45', 84'; Spânu Olar 30', 34', 74'; Iordanou 40'; Bajrakurtaj 51' (o.g.); Geogiou 68'; Zampa 75', 90+2' (pen.)	Report

GSZ Stadium, Larnaca
Referee: Linn Andersson (Sweden)

16 August 2012
17:00

Zhytlobud-1 Kharkiv (Ukraine)	0–3	(Cyprus) Apollon Limassol
	Report	Kostova 58'; Rus 60'; Farrelly 75'

Tsirio Stadium, Limassol
Referee: Jana Adámková (Czech Republic)
16 August 2012
17:00

Ada (Albania)	1–11	(Faroe Islands) KÍ Klaksvík
Baro 10'	Report	Thomsen 28', 33', 52', 85'; Purkhús 49', 57', 63', 81', 83'; Andreasen 53', 65'

GSZ Stadium, Larnaca
Referee: Rhona Daly (Ireland)

=== Group 7 ===
Pos	Team	Pld	W	D	L	GF	GA	GD	Pts	Qualification	MTK	PAOK	NTA	SKC
1	(Hungary) MTK	3	3	0	0	14	0	+14	9	Advance to main round	—	2–0	–	5–0
2	(Greece) PAOK	3	2	0	1	9	2	+7	6		–	—	1–0	8–0
3	(North Macedonia) Naše Taksi (H)	3	1	0	2	5	10	−5	3		0–7	–	—	–
4	(Latvia) Skonto/Cerība	3	0	0	3	2	18	−16	0		–	–	2–5	—

(H) Hosts
11 August 2012
17:00

PAOK (Greece)	1–0	(North Macedonia) Naše Taksi
Panteliadou 47'	Report

Stadion Blagoj Istatov, Strumica
Referee: Esther Azzopardi (Malta)
11 August 2012
17:00

MTK (Hungary)	5–0	(Latvia) Skonto/Cerība
Nagy 5'; Vágó 18', 90+3'; Pádár 71'	Report

Stadion Kukuš, Strumica
Referee: Zuzana Kováčová (Slovakia)

13 August 2012
17:00

PAOK (Greece)	8–0	(Latvia) Skonto/Cerība
Dimitrijević 3', 69', 77', 87'; Arvanitaki 29'; Panteliadou 32', 60'; Dimitriou 45'	Report

Stadion Blagoj Istatov, Strumica
Referee: Zuzana Kováčová (Slovakia)
13 August 2012
17:00

Naše Taksi (North Macedonia)	0–7	(Hungary) MTK
	Report	Pádár 5', 76'; Vágó 13', 15', 28' (pen.); Palkovics 73'; Smuczer 77'

Stadion Kukuš, Strumica
Referee: Monika Mularczyk (Poland)

16 August 2012
17:00

MTK (Hungary)	2–0	(Greece) PAOK
Nagy 31'; Vágó 90+1'	Report

Stadion Blagoj Istatov, Strumica
Referee: Esther Azzopardi (Malta)
16 August 2012
17:00

Skonto/Cerība (Latvia)	2–5	(North Macedonia) Naše Taksi
Levencova 6'; Brahimi 47' (o.g.)	Report	Brahimi 14' (pen.), 89'; Stankovska 24', 87'; Naceva 45+4'

Stadion Kukuš, Strumica
Referee: Monika Mularczyk (Poland)

=== Group 8 ===
Pos	Team	Pld	W	D	L	GF	GA	GD	Pts	Qualification	GLA	P35	OSI	NOR
1	(Scotland) Glasgow City	3	2	1	0	15	3	+12	7	Advance to main round	—	–	3–2	11–0
2	(Finland) PK-35 Vantaa (H)	3	2	1	0	10	2	+8	7	Advance to main round	1–1	—	–	6–0
3	(Croatia) Osijek	3	1	0	2	14	7	+7	3		–	1–3	—	–
4	(Moldova) Noroc	3	0	0	3	1	28	−27	0		–	–	1–11	—

(H) Hosts
11 August 2012
13:00

PK-35 Vantaa (Finland)	6–0	(Moldova) Noroc
Walker 20', 25', 37'; Taipale 59', 79'; Saarinen 74'	Report

Hakunila Sports Park, Vantaa
Referee: Simona Ghisletta (Switzerland)
11 August 2012
17:00

Glasgow City (Scotland)	3–2	(Croatia) Osijek
Dalziel 67', 79'; Mitchell 86'	Report	Lojna 9'; Kalamiza 75'

Myyrmäen jalkapallostadion, Vantaa
Referee: Carina Vitulano (Italy)

13 August 2012
17:30

Glasgow City (Scotland)	11–0	(Moldova) Noroc
Ross 4', 17'; Callaghan 8', 45+1'; McSorley 10', 21'; Dalziel 40'; Lindner 50', 54', 89'; McDonald 80'	Report

Hakunila Sports Park, Vantaa
Referee: Simona Ghisletta (Switzerland)
13 August 2012
17:30

Osijek (Croatia)	1–3	(Finland) PK-35 Vantaa
Andrlić 70'	Report	Leppikangas 14'; Walker 31'; Uwak 68'

Myyrmäen jalkapallostadion, Vantaa
Referee: Dilan Gökçek (Turkey)

16 August 2012
17:00

PK-35 Vantaa (Finland)	1–1	(Scotland) Glasgow City
Uwak 8'	Report	Ross 5'

Myyrmäen jalkapallostadion, Vantaa
Referee: Carina Vitulano (Italy)
16 August 2012
17:00

Noroc (Moldova)	1–11	(Croatia) Osijek
Mihalaş 43'	Report	Joščak 13', 82', 88'; Nevrkla 24', 85'; Lojna 42'; Kalamiza 47', 51', 68'; Culek 89'; Šalek 90+1'

Hakunila Sports Park, Vantaa
Referee: Dilan Gökçek (Turkey)

=== Ranking of group runners-up ===
The two best runners-up also qualify for the round of 32. The match against the fourth-placed team in the group does not count for the purposes of the runners-up table. The tie-breakers in this ranking are:

1. Higher number of points obtained
2. Superior goal difference
3. Higher number of goals scored
4. Higher number of club coefficient points
5. Fair play conduct in all group matches

Pos	Grp	Team	Pld	W	D	L	GF	GA	GD	Pts	Qualification
1	8	(Finland) PK-35 Vantaa	2	1	1	0	4	2	+2	4	Advance to main round
2	2	(Serbia) Spartak Subotica	2	1	0	1	7	2	+5	3	Advance to main round
3	3	(Portugal) 1° Dezembro	2	1	0	1	5	4	+1	3	
4	5	(Republic of Ireland) Peamount United	2	1	0	1	5	4	+1	3	
5	1	(Slovenia) Pomurje	2	1	0	1	4	4	0	3	
6	7	(Greece) PAOK	2	1	0	1	1	2	−1	3	
7	6	(Ukraine) Zhytlobud-1 Kharkiv	2	1	0	1	2	4	−2	3	
8	4	(Slovakia) Slovan Bratislava	2	1	0	1	3	7	−4	3	
