= Skonto =

Skonto may refer to

- BK Skonto, a former basketball club based in Riga, Latvia
- Skonto FC, a Latvian football club based in Riga
- FC Skonto/Cerība-46.vsk., a Latvian women's football club based in Riga
- Skonto Hall in Riga, Latvia
- Skonto Stadium in Riga next to Skonto Hall
