= 2013 FA WSL Cup final =

- Event: 2013 FA WSL Cup
Arsenal	Lincoln
2	0
- Date: 4 October 2013
- Venue: The Hive, London
- Referee: Lisa Rashid
- Attendance: 3,421

The 2013 FA WSL Cup final was the first final of the FA WSL Cup, England's secondary cup competition for women's football teams and its primary league cup tournament. Arsenal beat Lincoln 2–0.

== Match ==
=== Details ===
4 October 2013
19:30 BST

Arsenal	2–0	Lincoln
White 76'; Little 86'	Report

The Hive, Canons Park
Attendance: 3,421
Referee: Lisa Rashid

Arsenal	Lincoln

GK	1	(Republic of Ireland) Emma Byrne
RB	22	(England) Alex Scott
LCB	2	(England) Steph Houghton (c)
RCB	5	(England) Gilly Flaherty
LB	18	(Scotland) Emma Mitchell
RCM	16	(Scotland) Kim Little
LCM	8	(England) Jordan Nobbs
CDM	17	(England) Katie Chapman
LW	11	(England) Rachel Yankey
FW	9	(England) Ellen White
RW	15	(England) Danielle Carter	(substituted off) 81'
Substitutes:
GK	33	(England) Cherie Rowlands
DF	3	(Republic of Ireland) Yvonne Tracy
DF	25	(Jamaica) Jade Bailey
MF	24	(Ghana) Freda Ayisi
MF	20	(Scotland) Caroline Weir
MF	35	(England) Carla Humphrey
FW	12	(England) Gemma Davison	(substituted on) 81'
Manager:
(Scotland) Shelley Kerr

GK	1	(England) Karen Bardsley
RCB	5	(England) Sophie Bradley
LCB	6	(England) Casey Stoney (c)
RB	15	(England) Amy Turner
RW	23	(England) Aileen Whelan		(substituted off) 63'
CAM	10	(England) Remi Allen
RCM	12	(England) Bonnie Horwood		(substituted off) 81'
LCM	14	(England) Sophie Walton
LB	17	(England) Martha Harris
FW	21	(England) Courtney Sweetman-Kirk		(substituted off) 81'
LW	11	(England) Jessica Clarke	(yellow card) 62'
Substitutes:
GK	13	(England) Juliana Draycott
DF	2	(England) Lara Fay
DF	16	(England) Meaghan Sergeant		(substituted on) 63'
MF	7	(England) Megan Harris		(substituted on) 81'
MF	22	(England) Emily Roberts		(substituted on) 81'
MF	20	(England) Rachel Lee
Manager:
(England) Rick Passmoor

Player of the match

Assistant referees:

Fourth official:

Match rules

- 90 minutes.
- 30 minutes of extra-time if necessary.
- Penalty shoot-out if scores still level.
- Seven named substitutes.
- Maximum of three substitutions.
