= 2012–13 UEFA Women's Champions League =

12th edition of the European women's club football championship organized by UEFA

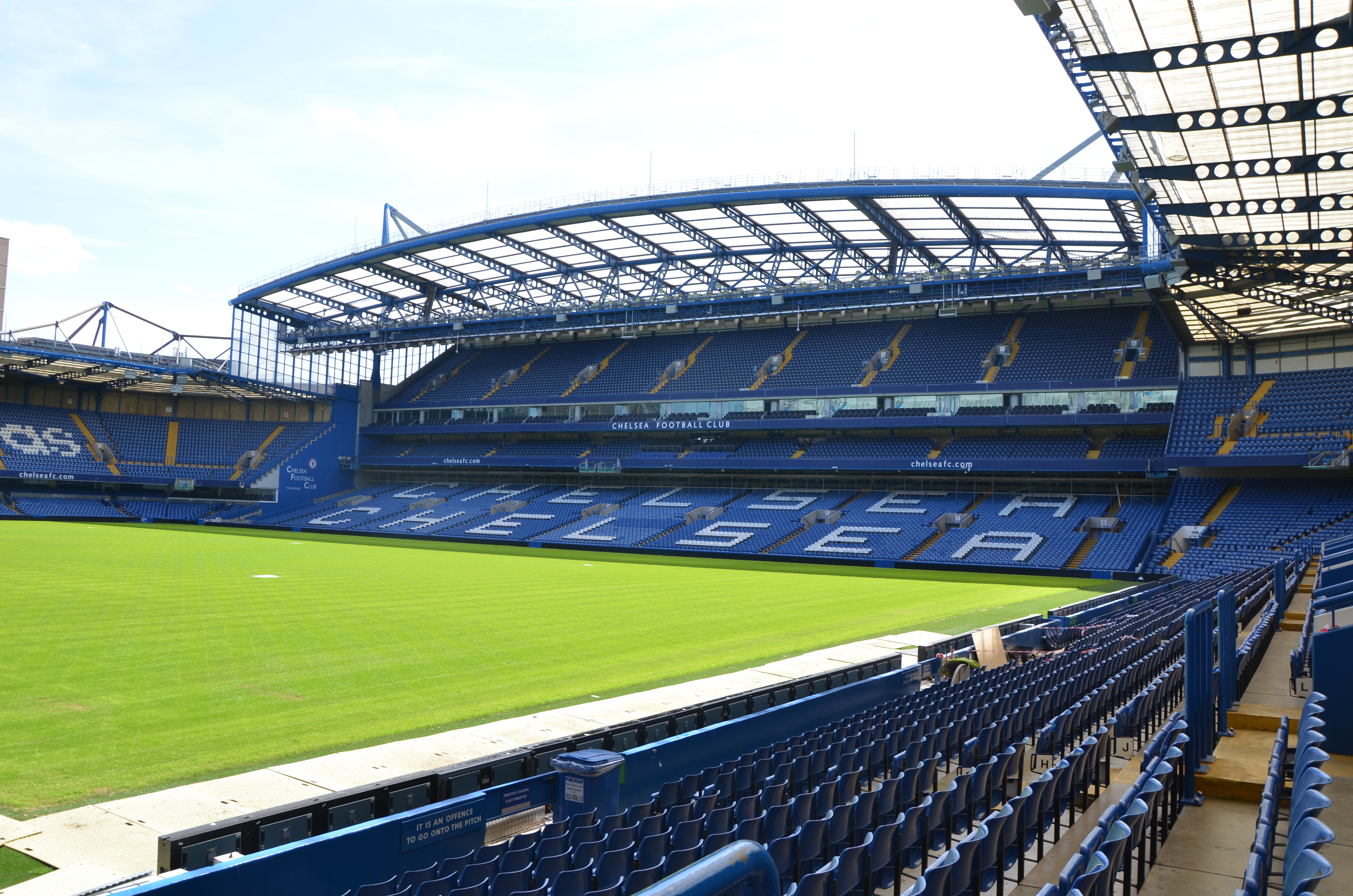
- Stamford Bridge in London hosted the final.

Tournament details
- Dates: 11 August 2012 – 23 May 2013
- Teams: 54

Final positions
- Champions: (Germany) Wolfsburg (1st title)
- Runners-up: (France) Lyon

Tournament statistics
- Top scorer(s): (Romania) Laura Rus; 11 goals

The 2012–13 UEFA Women's Champions League was the 12th edition of the European women's championship for football clubs. The final was held at Stamford Bridge, London, England on 23 May 2013.

== Team allocation and distribution ==
The national champions and runners-up, where known, in nations that have participated in the past five years are listed as expected to compete. Some of these teams may choose not to participate. Norway has overtaken Iceland in the UEFA coefficients and thus assured themselves a second entry.

Countries are allocated places according to their UEFA league coefficient for women. A first entry list was posted on 14 June 2012 by the Belgian representative. Not returning since last year is the champion of Luxembourg, for the first time Montenegro sends its champion. Here CH denotes the national champion, RU the national runner-up.

Round of 32
(Germany) Turbine Potsdam (CH)	(Germany) Wolfsburg (RU)	(France) Lyon (CH)	(France) Juvisy (RU)
(Sweden) Malmö (CH)	(Sweden) Göteborg (RU)	(Russia) Rossiyanka (CH)	(Russia) Zorky Krasnogorsk (RU)
(England) Arsenal (CH)	(England) Birmingham City (RU)^{Note 1}	(Denmark) Brøndby (CH)	(Denmark) Fortuna Hjørring (RU)
(Italy) Torres (CH)	(Italy) Bardolino Verona (RU)	(Norway) Røa (CH)	(Norway) Stabæk (RU)
(Iceland) Stjarnan (CH)	(Austria) Neulengbach (CH)	(Spain) Barcelona (CH)	(Belgium) Standard Liège (CH)
(Czech Republic) Sparta Prague (CH)	(Netherlands) ADO Den Haag (CH)		
Qualifying round
(Belarus) Bobruichanka (CH)	(Kazakhstan) BIIK Kazygurt (CH)	(Poland) Unia Racibórz (CH)	(Ukraine) Zhytlobud-1 Kharkiv (CH)
(Hungary) MTK Hungária (CH)	(Finland) PK-35 Vantaa (CH)	(Greece) PAOK (CH)	(Switzerland) Zürich (CH)
(Serbia) Spartak Subotica (CH)	(Scotland) Glasgow City (CH)	(Bulgaria) NSA Sofia (CH)	(Romania) Olimpia Cluj (CH)
(Portugal) 1º de Dezembro (CH)	(Slovenia) Pomurje (CH)	(Bosnia and Herzegovina) SFK 2000 (CH)	(Israel) ASA Tel Aviv University (CH)
(Lithuania) Gintra Universitetas (CH)	(Cyprus) Apollon Limassol (CH)	(Slovakia) Slovan Bratislava (CH)	(Wales) Cardiff Met. (CH)
(Republic of Ireland) Peamount United (CH)	(Faroe Islands) KÍ Klaksvík (CH)	(Moldova) FC Noroc (CH)	(Croatia) Osijek (CH)
(Turkey) Ataşehir Belediyesi (CH)	(Northern Ireland) Glentoran Belfast United (CH)	(Estonia) Pärnu JK (CH)	(North Macedonia) Naše Taksi (CH)
(Malta) Birkirkara (CH)	(Latvia) Skonto/Ceriba (CH)	(Albania) Ada (CH)	(Montenegro) Ekonomist (CH)

1. On 6 December 2011 it was announced that the 2011 FA WSL Runners-up were given the spot, and not as initially planned the 2011–12 FA Women's Cup winner.

== Round and draw dates ==
UEFA has scheduled the competition as follows.

Round	Draw	First leg	Second leg
Qualifying round	28 June 2012	11–16 August 2012	
Round of 32	23 August 2012	26–27 September 2012	3–4 October 2012
Round of 16	23 August 2012	31 October–1 November 2012	7–8 November 2012
Quarterfinals	27 November 2012	20–21 March 2013	27–28 March 2013
Semifinals	27 November 2012	13–14 April 2013	20–21 April 2013
Final	27 November 2012	23 May 2013	

== Qualifying round ==
32 teams entered in the qualifying round, and were divided into eight groups of four teams, with one team from each seeding pot. Host countries won't be drawn together.

Groups were played as mini tournaments over a span of six days.

=== Group 1 ===
Pos	Team	Pld	W	D	L	GF	GA	GD	Pts	Qualification	ZUR	POM	ABE	GIN
1	(Switzerland) Zürich	3	3	0	0	14	0	+14	9	Advance to main round	—	2–0	4–0	–
2	(Slovenia) Pomurje (H)	3	2	0	1	13	5	+8	6		–	—	–	9–1
3	(Turkey) Ataşehir Belediyesi	3	1	0	2	5	10	−5	3		–	2–4	—	–
4	(Lithuania) Gintra Universitetas	3	0	0	3	3	20	−17	0		0–8	–	2–3	—

(H) Hosts

=== Group 2 ===
Pos	Team	Pld	W	D	L	GF	GA	GD	Pts	Qualification	BKA	SUB	NSA	PAR
1	(Kazakhstan) BIIK Kazygurt	3	3	0	0	9	0	+9	9	Advance to main round	—	–	4–0	3–0
2	(Serbia) Spartak Subotica (H)	3	2	0	1	8	2	+6	6	Advance to main round	0–2	—	–	–
3	(Bulgaria) NSA Sofia	3	1	0	2	2	11	−9	3		–	0–7	—	2–0
4	(Estonia) Pärnu JK	3	0	0	3	0	6	−6	0		–	0–1	–	—

(H) Hosts

=== Group 3 ===
Pos	Team	Pld	W	D	L	GF	GA	GD	Pts	Qualification	CLU	DEZ	GLE	BIR
1	(Romania) Olimpia Cluj	3	3	0	0	16	3	+13	9	Advance to main round	—	4–1	–	8–0
2	(Portugal) 1° Dezembro	3	2	0	1	6	4	+2	6		–	—	4–0	1–0
3	(Northern Ireland) Glentoran Belfast United	3	1	0	2	5	9	−4	3		2–4	–	—	–
4	(Malta) Birkirkara (H)	3	0	0	3	1	12	−11	0		–	–	1–3	—

(H) Hosts

=== Group 4 ===
Pos	Team	Pld	W	D	L	GF	GA	GD	Pts	Qualification	UNR	SBR	BOB	EKO
1	(Poland) Unia Racibórz	3	3	0	0	17	1	+16	9	Advance to main round	—	5–0	–	7–1
2	(Slovakia) Slovan Bratislava (H)	3	2	0	1	11	7	+4	6		–	—	3–2	–
3	(Belarus) Bobruichanka	3	1	0	2	7	9	−2	3		0–5	–	—	5–1
4	(Montenegro) Ekonomist	3	0	0	3	2	20	−18	0		–	0–8	–	—

(H) Hosts

=== Group 5 ===
Pos	Team	Pld	W	D	L	GF	GA	GD	Pts	Qualification	SFK	PEA	ASA	CAR
1	(Bosnia and Herzegovina) SFK 2000 (H)	3	2	1	0	6	1	+5	7	Advance to main round	—	4–0	–	1–0
2	(Republic of Ireland) Peamount United	3	2	0	1	9	4	+5	6		–	—	5–0	–
3	(Israel) ASA Tel Aviv University	3	1	1	1	6	6	0	4		1–1	–	—	5–0
4	(Wales) Cardiff Met.	3	0	0	3	0	10	−10	0		–	0–4	–	—

(H) Hosts

=== Group 6 ===
Pos	Team	Pld	W	D	L	GF	GA	GD	Pts	Qualification	APL	KHA	KIK	ADA
1	(Cyprus) Apollon Limassol (H)	3	3	0	0	31	0	+31	9	Advance to main round	—	–	7–0	21–0
2	(Ukraine) Zhytlobud-1 Kharkiv	3	2	0	1	16	5	+11	6		0–3	—	–	14–1
3	(Faroe Islands) KÍ Klaksvík	3	1	0	2	12	10	+2	3		–	1–2	—	–
4	(Albania) Ada	3	0	0	3	2	46	−44	0		–	–	1–11	—

(H) Hosts

=== Group 7 ===
Pos	Team	Pld	W	D	L	GF	GA	GD	Pts	Qualification	MTK	PAOK	NTA	SKC
1	(Hungary) MTK	3	3	0	0	14	0	+14	9	Advance to main round	—	2–0	–	5–0
2	(Greece) PAOK	3	2	0	1	9	2	+7	6		–	—	1–0	8–0
3	(North Macedonia) Naše Taksi (H)	3	1	0	2	5	10	−5	3		0–7	–	—	–
4	(Latvia) Skonto/Cerība	3	0	0	3	2	18	−16	0		–	–	2–5	—

(H) Hosts

=== Group 8 ===
Pos	Team	Pld	W	D	L	GF	GA	GD	Pts	Qualification	GLA	P35	OSI	NOR
1	(Scotland) Glasgow City	3	2	1	0	15	3	+12	7	Advance to main round	—	–	3–2	11–0
2	(Finland) PK-35 Vantaa (H)	3	2	1	0	10	2	+8	7	Advance to main round	1–1	—	–	6–0
3	(Croatia) Osijek	3	1	0	2	14	7	+7	3		–	1–3	—	–
4	(Moldova) Noroc	3	0	0	3	1	28	−27	0		–	–	1–11	—

(H) Hosts

=== Ranking of group runners-up ===
The two best runners-up also qualify for the round of 32. The match against the fourth-placed team in the group does not count for the purposes of the runners-up table. The tie-breakers in this ranking are:

1. Higher number of points obtained
2. Superior goal difference
3. Higher number of goals scored
4. Higher number of club coefficient points
5. Fair play conduct in all group matches

Grp	Team	Pld	W	D	L	GF	GA	GD	Pts
8	(Finland) PK-35 Vantaa	2	1	1	0	4	2	+2	4
2	(Serbia) Spartak Subotica	2	1	0	1	7	2	+5	3
3	(Portugal) 1° Dezembro	2	1	0	1	5	4	+1	3
5	(Republic of Ireland) Peamount United	2	1	0	1	5	4	+1	3
1	(Slovenia) Pomurje	2	1	0	1	4	4	0	3
7	(Greece) PAOK	2	1	0	1	1	2	−1	3
6	(Ukraine) Zhytlobud-1 Kharkiv	2	1	0	1	2	4	−2	3
4	(Slovakia) Slovan Bratislava	2	1	0	1	3	7	−4	3

== Knockout phase ==
The top 16 ranked teams are seeded for the round of 32. Team that qualified through the qualifying round are marked with (Q).

Seeded:

- (France) Lyon
- (Germany) Turbine Potsdam
- (England) Arsenal
- (Russia) Rossiyanka
- (Denmark) Brøndby
- (Italy) Torres
- (France) Juvisy
- (Italy) Bardolino Verona
- (Austria) Neulengbach
- (Sweden) Göteborg
- (Czech Republic) Sparta Praha
- (Denmark) Fortuna Hjørring
- (Sweden) LdB Malmö
- (Norway) Røa
- (Germany) Wolfsburg
- (Russia) Zorky Krasnogorsk

Unseeded:

- (Scotland) Glasgow City (Q)
- (Poland) Unia Racibórz (Q)
- (Belgium) Standard Liège
- (England) Birmingham City
- (Norway) Stabæk
- (Switzerland) Zürich (Q)
- (Cyprus) Apollon Limassol (Q)
- (Bosnia and Herzegovina) SFK 2000 (Q)
- (Hungary) MTK (Q)
- (Spain) Barcelona
- (Finland) PK-35 Vantaa (Q)
- (Iceland) Stjarnan
- (Romania) Olimpia Cluj (Q)
- (Kazakhstan) BIIK Kazygurt (Q)
- (Serbia) Spartak Subotica (Q)
- (Netherlands) ADO Den Haag

=== Bracket ===
Round of 32
(Spain) Barcelona	0	0	0
(England) Arsenal	3	4	7
(Belgium) Liège	1	0	1
(Germany) Turbine Potsdam	3	5	8
(Cyprus) Apollon Limassol	2	1	3
(Italy) Torres	3	3	6
(Romania) Cluj (a)	1	2	3
(Austria) Neulengbach	1	2	3
(Poland) Racibórz	1	1	2
(Germany) Wolfsburg	5	6	11
(Kazakhstan) Kazygurt	0	0	0
(Norway) Røa	4	4	8
(Bosnia and Herzegovina) SFK 2000	0	0	0
(Czech Republic) Sparta Prague	3	3	6
(Netherlands) Den Haag	1	2	3
(Russia) Rossiyanka	4	1	5
(Iceland) Stjarnan	0	1	1
(Russia) Krasnogorsk	0	3	3
(Finland) PK-35 Vantaa	0	0	0
(France) Lyon	7	5	12
(Hungary) MTK	0	1	1
(Sweden) Malmö	4	6	10
(England) Birmingham City	2	0	2
(Italy) Verona	0	3	3
(Norway) Stabæk	2	3	5
(Denmark) Brøndby	0	3	3
(Switzerland) Zürich	1	0	1
(France) Juvisy	1	1	2
(Scotland) Glasgow City	1	0	1
(Denmark) Fortuna Hjørring	2	0	2
(Serbia) Subotica	0	0	0
(Sweden) Göteborg	1	3	4

Round of 16
(England) Arsenal	2	4	6
(Germany) Turbine Potsdam	1	3	4
(Italy) Torres	4	3	7
(Romania) Cluj	1	0	1
(Germany) Wolfsburg	4	1	5
(Norway) Røa	1	1	2
(Czech Republic) Sparta Prague	0	2	2
(Russia) Rossiyanka	1	2	3
(Russia) Krasnogorsk	0	0	0
(France) Lyon	9	2	11
(Sweden) Malmö	1	2	3
(Italy) Verona	0	0	0
(Norway) Stabæk	0	1	1
(France) Juvisy	0	2	2
(Denmark) Fortuna Hjørring	1	2	3
(Sweden) Göteborg	1	3	4

Quarterfinals
(England) Arsenal	3	1	4
(Italy) Torres	1	0	1
(Germany) Wolfsburg	2	2	4
(Russia) Rossiyanka	1	0	1
(France) Lyon	5	3	8
(Sweden) Malmö	0	0	0
(France) Juvisy	1	3	4
(Sweden) Göteborg	0	1	1

Semifinals
(England) Arsenal	0	1	1
(Germany) Wolfsburg	2	2	4
(France) Lyon	3	6	9
(France) Juvisy	0	1	1

Final
(Germany) Wolfsburg	1
(France) Lyon	0

=== Round of 32 ===
Team 1	Agg.	Team 2	1st leg	2nd leg
Barcelona (Spain)	0–7	(England) Arsenal	0–3	0–4
Standard Liège (Belgium)	1–8	(Germany) Turbine Potsdam	1–3	0–5
Apollon Limassol (Cyprus)	3–6	(Italy) Torres	2–3	1–3
Olimpia Cluj (Romania)	3–3 (a)	(Austria) Neulengbach	1–1	2–2 (a.e.t.)
Unia Racibórz (Poland)	2–11	(Germany) Wolfsburg	1–5	1–6
BIIK Kazygurt (Kazakhstan)	0–8	(Norway) Røa	0–4	0–4
SFK 2000 (Bosnia and Herzegovina)	0–6	(Czech Republic) Sparta Prague	0–3	0–3
ADO Den Haag (Netherlands)	3–5	(Russia) Rossiyanka	1–4	2–1
Stjarnan (Iceland)	1–3	(Russia) Zorky Krasnogorsk	0–0	1–3
PK-35 Vantaa (Finland)	0–12	(France) Lyon	0–7	0–5
MTK (Hungary)	1–10	(Sweden) Malmö	0–4	1–6
Birmingham City (England)	2–3	(Italy) Bardolino Verona	2–0	0–3 (a.e.t.)
Stabæk (Norway)	5–3	(Denmark) Brøndby	2–0	3–3
Zürich (Switzerland)	1–2	(France) Juvisy	1–1	0–1
Glasgow City (Scotland)	1–2	(Denmark) Fortuna Hjørring	1–2	0–0
Spartak Subotica (Serbia)	0–4	(Sweden) Göteborg	0–1	0–3

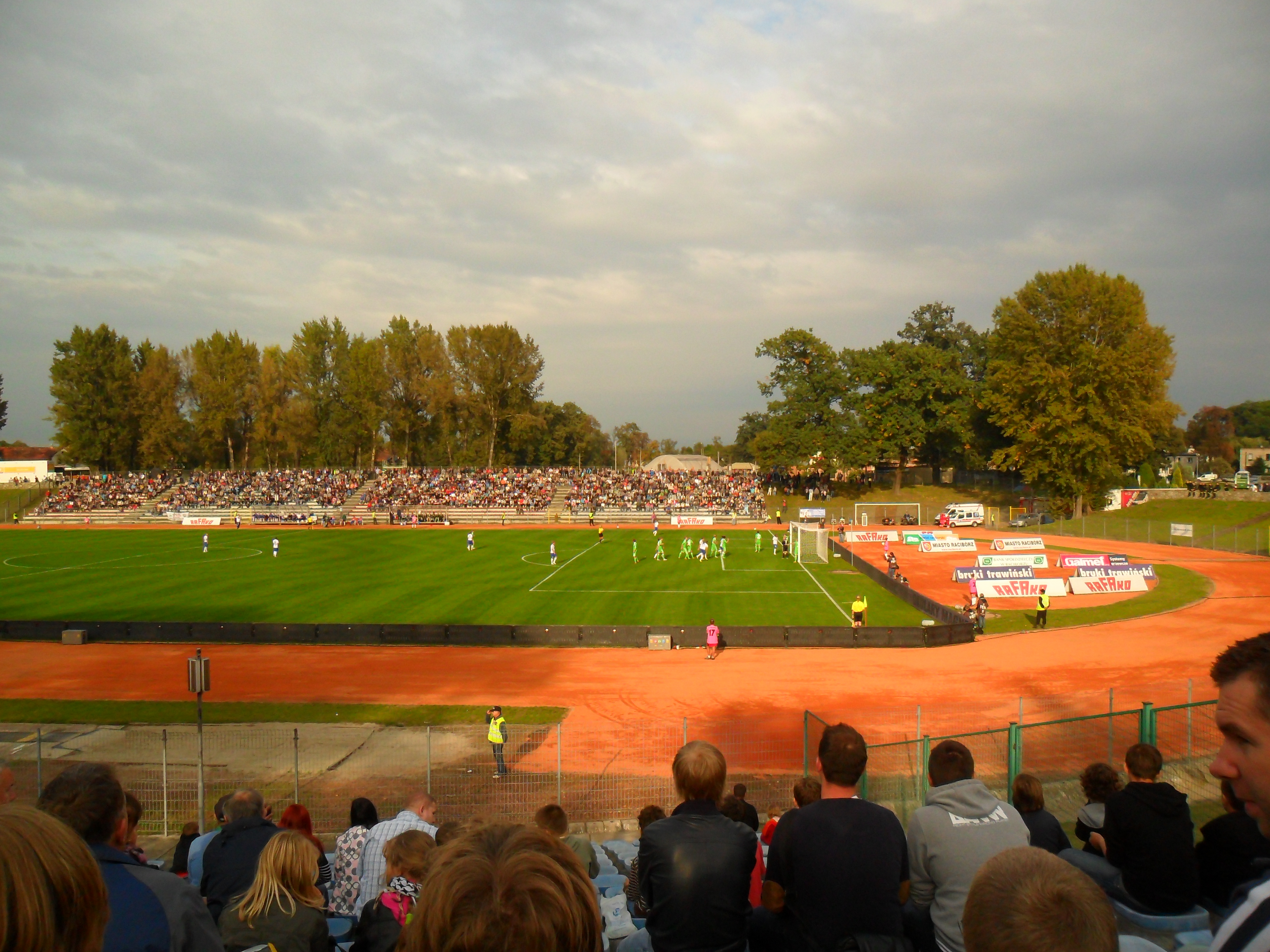
Unia Racibórz – Wolfsburg (1–5)

=== Round of 16 ===
Team 1	Agg.	Team 2	1st leg	2nd leg
Arsenal (England)	6–4	(Germany) Turbine Potsdam	2–1	4–3
Torres (Italy)	7–1	(Romania) Olimpia Cluj	4–1	3–0
Wolfsburg (Germany)	5–2	(Norway) Røa	4–1	1–1
Sparta Prague (Czech Republic)	2–3	(Russia) Rossiyanka	0–1	2–2
Zorky Krasnogorsk (Russia)	0–11	(France) Lyon	0–9	0–2
Malmö (Sweden)	3–0	(Italy) Bardolino Verona	1–0	2–0
Stabæk (Norway)	1–2	(France) Juvisy	0–0	1–2
Fortuna Hjørring (Denmark)	3–4	(Sweden) Göteborg	1–1	2–3

=== Quarter-finals ===
There was an open draw held for the quarterfinals and the following rounds on 27 November 2012.

Team 1	Agg.	Team 2	1st leg	2nd leg
Arsenal (England)	4–1	(Italy) Torres	3–1	1–0
Wolfsburg (Germany)	4–1	(Russia) Rossiyanka	2–1	2–0
Lyon (France)	8–0	(Sweden) LdB Malmö	5–0	3–0
Juvisy (France)	4–1	(Sweden) Göteborg	1–0	3–1

=== Semi-finals ===
Team 1	Agg.	Team 2	1st leg	2nd leg
Arsenal (England)	1–4	(Germany) Wolfsburg	0–2	1–2
Lyon (France)	9–1	(France) Juvisy	3–0	6–1

=== Final ===
23 May 2013
19:30 BST

Wolfsburg (Germany)	1–0	(France) Lyon
Müller 73' (pen.)	Report

Stamford Bridge, London
Attendance: 19,278
Referee: Teodora Albon (Romania)

== Statistics ==
Top scorers (excluding qualifying rounds and play-off round):

=== Top goalscorers ===
The top-scorer award is given to the player scoring the most goals including the qualifying rounds, thus Romanian player Laura Rus from Apollon Limassol won the award by scoring 11 goals up to the round of 32. Conny Pohlers scored her 42nd goal in the competition history, to become the sole all-time topscorer.

The following are the top scorers excluding the qualifying round.

Rank	Name	Team	Goals	Minutes played
1	(Germany) Conny Pohlers	(Germany) Wolfsburg	8	514'
1	(Italy) Patrizia Panico	(Italy) Torres	8	540'
3	(Sweden) Lotta Schelin	(France) Lyon	7	365'
4	(France) Laëtitia Tonazzi	(France) Lyon	6	338'
5	(North Macedonia) Nataša Andonova	(Germany) Turbine Potsdam	5	190'
5	(France) Camille Abily	(France) Lyon	5	627'
5	(France) Louisa Nécib	(France) Lyon	5	630'
5	(Germany) Martina Müller	(Germany) Wolfsburg	5	737'
9	(England) Kelly Smith	(England) Arsenal	4	238'
9	(Scotland) Jen Beattie	(England) Arsenal	4	243'
