= Manuela Zürcher =

Swiss footballer (born 1982)

Personal information
- Full name: Manuela Zürcher
- Date of birth: 15 September 1982 (age 44)
- Place of birth: Switzerland
- Position: Midfielder

Senior career*
Years	Team	Apps	(Gls)
?–2004	Schwerzenbach		
2004–	Zürich		

International career
1999–2004	Switzerland	27	(4)
- * Club domestic league appearances and goals

Manuela Zürcher is a Swiss football midfielder currently playing in the Nationalliga A for FC Zürich, with which she has also played the Champions League. She was a member of the Swiss national team from 1999 to 2004.
