= Anne Meiwald =

English footballer

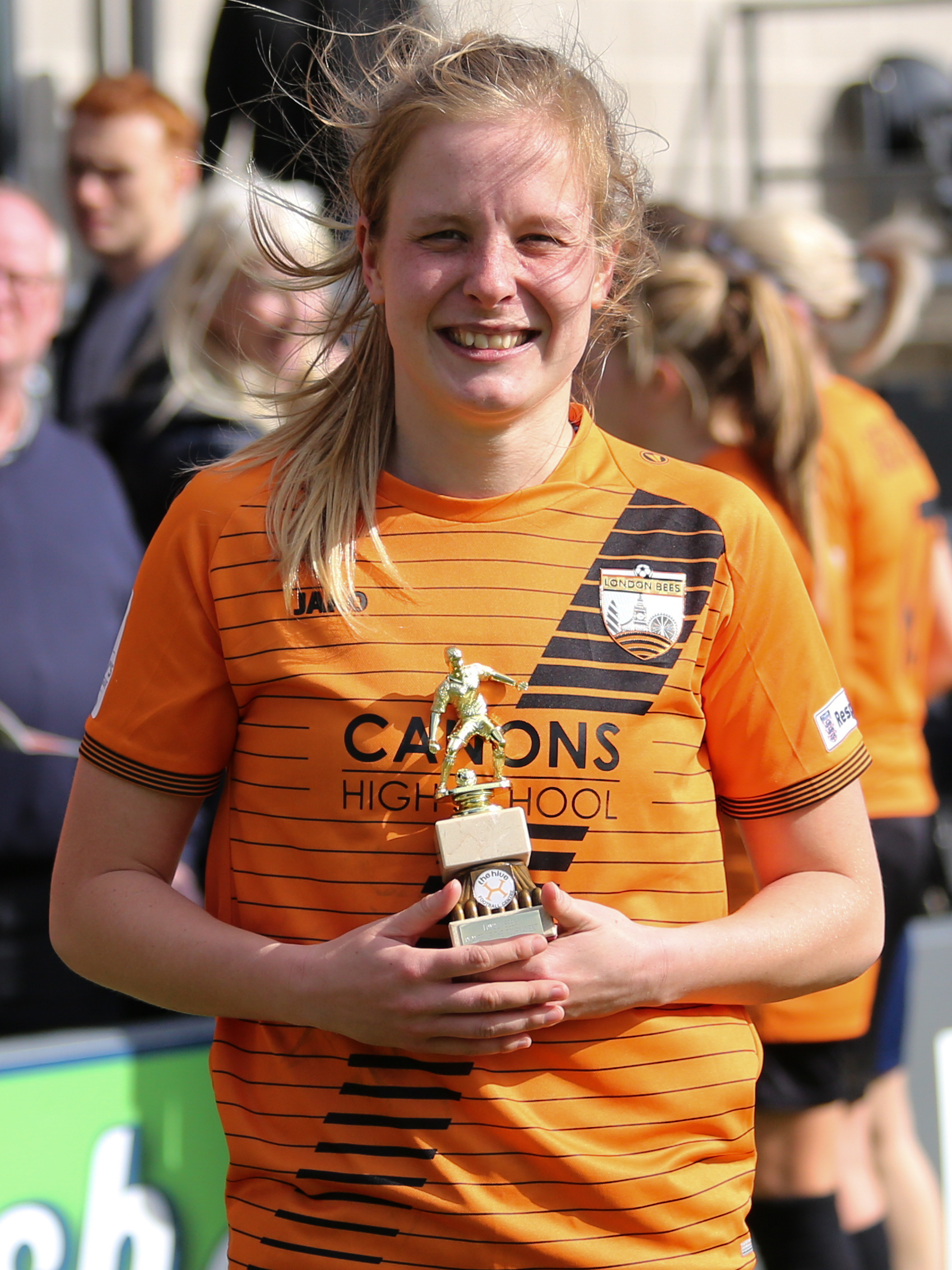

Personal information
- Full name: Anne Meiwald
- Date of birth: 15 March 1995 (age 31)
- Place of birth: Worms, Germany
- Position: Centre back

Team information
- Current team: Watford
- Number: 5

Senior career*
Years	Team	Apps	(Gls)
2013	Arsenal		
2013–2017	Chelsea	4	(0)
2017–2018	London Bees		
2018–2019	Tottenham Hotspur	4	(0)
2019-	Watford	51	(2)
- * Club domestic league appearances and goals

Anne Meiwald (born 15 March 1995) is a German footballer who plays as a defender who currently plays for Watford in the FA Women's National League South.

== Biography ==
Meiwald was born 15 March 1995 in Worms, Germany.

She has previously played for Arsenal, Chelsea, London Bees and Tottenham Hotspur, and joined Watford in July 2019.

== Awards ==
She played in the Women's Super League, in which she was a runner-up in 2014 and winner in 2015. For the 2014–15 season, she won the Women's FA Cup and was a runner-up the following year. She was also a runner-up for the 2018–19 Women's Championship and 2022–23 FA Women's League Cup.
