= FC Skonto/Cerība-46.vsk. =

Former Latvian women's football club

FC Skonto/Cerība
- Full name: FC Skonto/Cerība-46. vidusskola Sporta klubs "Cerība"
- Founded: 2004
- Dissolved: after 2013
- Ground: Alberts Šeibelis Stadium, Riga
- Capacity: 1,000
- Chairman: Igors Zaicevs
- Manager: Tatjana Salimova
- League: Latvian League
- 2012: 2nd
Home colours	Away colours

FC Skonto/Cerība-46.vsk., or Skonto Cerība and Skonto FK, was a Latvian women's football club from Riga. It was founded in 2004 as SK Cerība-46.vsk. It took its later name after it was absorbed by Skonto FC in 2007, becoming its women's team. The team won five national championships since its debut in 2004. It played in the UEFA Champions League for the first time in the 2012-13 season.

In 2013, the team changed its name to FK Olaine/Cerība 46.vsk., uniting with the amateur team FK Olaine and later apparently dropping Cerība-46.vsk from its name sometime after 2016, as the later jointly associated with the Rīgas FS team. Skonto was dissolved in 2016.

As of 2026, the FK Olaine women's team fields a common team together with FK Iecava in the LuckyBet Women's Football League.

== Titles ==
- Latvian League (5)
  - 2004, 2006, 2008, 2009, 2011

=== Other results ===
Place	Year
2nd	2007, 2010, 2012
3rd	2005

=== UEFA competition record ===
Season	Competition	Stage	Result	Opponent	Scorers
2012–13	Champions League	Group Stage	0–5	(Hungary) MTK Budapest	
			0–8	(Greece) PAOK	
			2–5	(North Macedonia) Nashe Taksi	Levencova + 1 o.g.
