= Lilla Nagy =

Hungarian football player

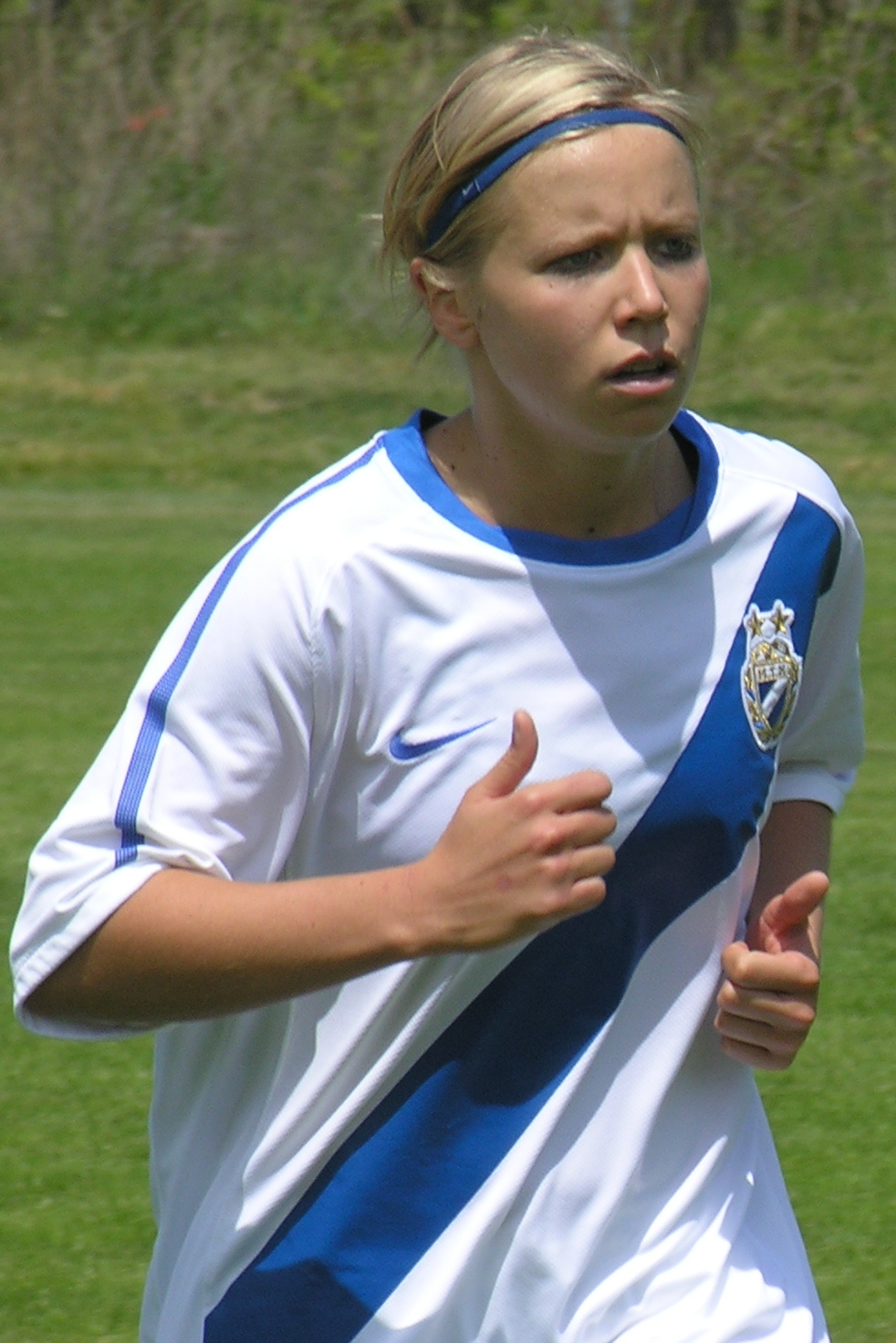

Personal information
- Full name: Lilla Nagy
- Date of birth: 18 December 1989 (age 36)
- Place of birth: Pécs, Hungary
- Position: Forward

Senior career*
Years	Team	Apps	(Gls)
2006–2010	Pécsi MFC	91	(86)
2010–	MTK		

International career^{‡}
2012–	Hungary	27	(2)
- * Club domestic league appearances and goals ‡ National team caps and goals as of 30 June 2017

Lilla Nagy (born 18 December 1989 in Pécs) is a Hungarian football forward currently playing in the Hungarian First Division for MTK Hungária, with whom she has also played the Champions League. She is a member of the Hungarian national team.
