= 2012–13 UEFA Women's Champions League knockout phase =

Tournament details
- Dates: 26 September 2012 – 23 May 2013
- Teams: 32

The 2012–13 UEFA Women's Champions League knockout phase began on 26 September 2012 and concluded on 23 May 2013 with the final at Stamford Bridge, London, England to decide the champions of the 2012–13 UEFA Women's Champions League. A total of 32 teams competed in the knockout phase.

== Round and draw dates ==
UEFA has scheduled the competition as follows.

Round	Draw	First leg	Second leg
Round of 32	23 August 2012	26–27 September 2012	3–4 October 2012
Round of 16	23 August 2012	31 October–1 November 2012	7–8 November 2012
Quarterfinals	27 November 2012	20–21 March 2013	27–28 March 2013
Semifinals	27 November 2012	13–14 April 2013	20–21 April 2013
Final	27 November 2012	23 May 2013	

== Format ==
The knockout phase involved 32 teams: 22 teams which qualified directly, and 10 teams which qualified from the qualifying round (eight group winners and two best runners-up).

Each tie in the knockout phase, apart from the final, was played over two legs, with each team playing one leg at home. The team that scored more goals on aggregate over the two legs advanced to the next round. If the aggregate score was level, the away goals rule was applied, i.e. the team that scored more goals away from home over the two legs advanced. If away goals were also equal, then 30 minutes of extra time were played. The away goals rule was again applied after extra time, i.e. if there were goals scored during extra time and the aggregate score was still level, the visiting team advanced by virtue of more away goals scored. If no goals were scored during extra time, the tie was decided by a penalty shoot-out. In the final, which was played as a single match, if scores were level at the end of normal time, extra time was played, followed by a penalty shoot-out if scores remained tied.

The mechanism of the draws for each round was as follows:

- In the draw for the round of 32, 16 teams were seeded and 16 teams were unseeded, based on their UEFA club coefficients at the beginning of the season. The seeded teams were drawn against the unseeded teams, with the seeded teams hosting the second leg. Teams from the same group or the same association could not be drawn against each other.
- In the draws for the round of 16 onwards, there were no seedings, and teams from the same group or the same association could be drawn against each other.

== Qualified teams ==
The top 16 ranked teams are seeded for the round of 32. Team that qualified through the qualifying round are marked with (Q).

Seeded:

- (France) Lyon
- (Germany) Turbine Potsdam
- (England) Arsenal
- (Russia) Rossiyanka
- (Denmark) Brøndby
- (Italy) Torres
- (France) Juvisy
- (Italy) Bardolino Verona
- (Austria) Neulengbach
- (Sweden) Göteborg
- (Czech Republic) Sparta Praha
- (Denmark) Fortuna Hjørring
- (Sweden) LdB Malmö
- (Norway) Røa
- (Germany) Wolfsburg
- (Russia) Zorky Krasnogorsk

Unseeded:

- (Scotland) Glasgow City (Q)
- (Poland) Unia Racibórz (Q)
- (Belgium) Standard Liège
- (England) Birmingham City
- (Norway) Stabæk
- (Switzerland) Zürich (Q)
- (Cyprus) Apollon Limassol (Q)
- (Bosnia and Herzegovina) SFK 2000 (Q)
- (Hungary) MTK (Q)
- (Spain) Barcelona
- (Finland) PK-35 Vantaa (Q)
- (Iceland) Stjarnan
- (Romania) Olimpia Cluj (Q)
- (Kazakhstan) BIIK Kazygurt (Q)
- (Serbia) Spartak Subotica (Q)
- (Netherlands) ADO Den Haag

== Bracket ==
Round of 32
(Spain) Barcelona	0	0	7
(England) Arsenal	3	4	0
(Belgium) Liège	1	0	1
(Germany) Turbine Potsdam	3	5	8
(Cyprus) Apollon Limassol	2	1	3
(Italy) Torres	3	3	6
(Romania) Cluj (a)	1	2	3
(Austria) Neulengbach	1	2	3
(Poland) Racibórz	1	1	2
(Germany) Wolfsburg	5	6	11
(Kazakhstan) Kazygurt	0	0	0
(Norway) Røa	4	4	8
(Bosnia and Herzegovina) SFK 2000	0	0	0
(Czech Republic) Sparta Prague	3	3	6
(Netherlands) Den Haag	1	2	3
(Russia) Rossiyanka	4	1	5
(Iceland) Stjarnan	0	1	1
(Russia) Krasnogorsk	0	3	3
(Finland) PK-35 Vantaa	0	0	0
(France) Lyon	7	5	12
(Hungary) MTK	0	1	1
(Sweden) Malmö	4	6	10
(England) Birmingham City	2	0	2
(Italy) Verona	0	3	3
(Norway) Stabæk	2	3	5
(Denmark) Brøndby	0	3	3
(Switzerland) Zürich	1	0	1
(France) Juvisy	1	1	2
(Scotland) Glasgow City	1	0	1
(Denmark) Fortuna Hjørring	2	0	2
(Serbia) Subotica	0	0	0
(Sweden) Göteborg	1	3	4

Round of 16
(England) Arsenal	2	4	6
(Germany) Turbine Potsdam	1	3	4
(Italy) Torres	4	3	7
(Romania) Cluj	1	0	1
(Germany) Wolfsburg	4	1	5
(Norway) Røa	1	1	2
(Czech Republic) Sparta Prague	0	2	2
(Russia) Rossiyanka	1	2	3
(Russia) Krasnogorsk	0	0	0
(France) Lyon	9	2	11
(Sweden) Malmö	1	2	3
(Italy) Verona	0	0	0
(Norway) Stabæk	0	1	1
(France) Juvisy	0	2	2
(Denmark) Fortuna Hjørring	1	2	3
(Sweden) Göteborg	1	3	4

Quarterfinals
(England) Arsenal	3	1	4
(Italy) Torres	1	0	1
(Germany) Wolfsburg	2	2	4
(Russia) Rossiyanka	1	0	1
(France) Lyon	5	3	8
(Sweden) Malmö	0	0	0
(France) Juvisy	1	3	4
(Sweden) Göteborg	0	1	1

Semifinals
(England) Arsenal	0	1	1
(Germany) Wolfsburg	2	2	4
(France) Lyon	3	6	9
(France) Juvisy	0	1	1

Final
(Germany) Wolfsburg	1
(France) Lyon	0

== Round of 32 ==
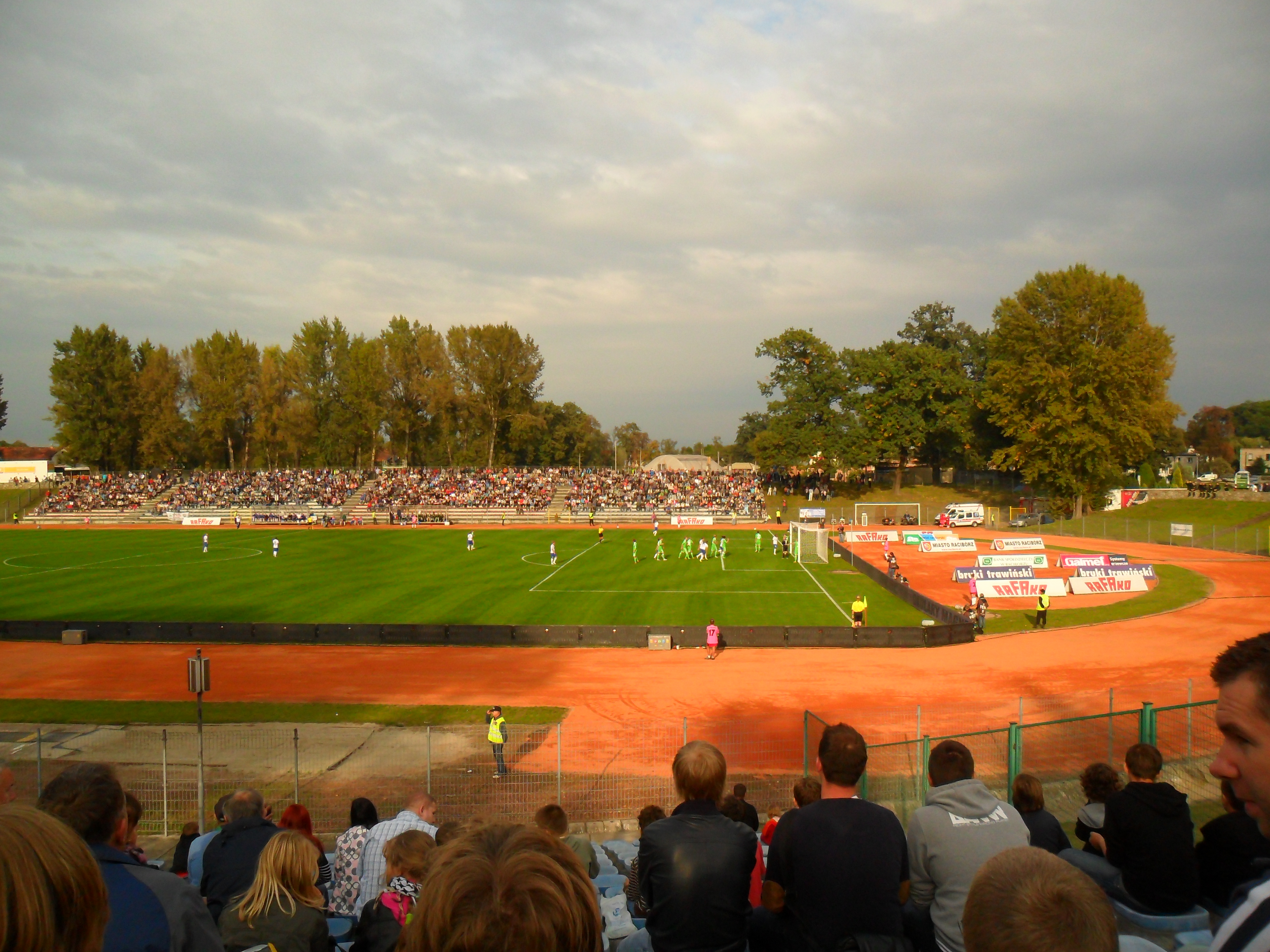
Unia Racibórz – Wolfsburg (1–5)

Team 1	Agg.	Team 2	1st leg	2nd leg
Barcelona (Spain)	0–7	(England) Arsenal	0–3	0–4
Standard Liège (Belgium)	1–8	(Germany) Turbine Potsdam	1–3	0–5
Apollon Limassol (Cyprus)	3–6	(Italy) Torres	2–3	1–3
Olimpia Cluj (Romania)	3–3 (a)	(Austria) Neulengbach	1–1	2–2 (a.e.t.)
Unia Racibórz (Poland)	2–11	(Germany) Wolfsburg	1–5	1–6
BIIK Kazygurt (Kazakhstan)	0–8	(Norway) Røa	0–4	0–4
SFK 2000 (Bosnia and Herzegovina)	0–6	(Czech Republic) Sparta Prague	0–3	0–3
ADO Den Haag (Netherlands)	3–5	(Russia) Rossiyanka	1–4	2–1
Stjarnan (Iceland)	1–3	(Russia) Zorky Krasnogorsk	0–0	1–3
PK-35 Vantaa (Finland)	0–12	(France) Lyon	0–7	0–5
MTK (Hungary)	1–10	(Sweden) Malmö	0–4	1–6
Birmingham City (England)	2–3	(Italy) Bardolino Verona	2–0	0–3 (a.e.t.)
Stabæk (Norway)	5–3	(Denmark) Brøndby	2–0	3–3
Zürich (Switzerland)	1–2	(France) Juvisy	1–1	0–1
Glasgow City (Scotland)	1–2	(Denmark) Fortuna Hjørring	1–2	0–0
Spartak Subotica (Serbia)	0–4	(Sweden) Göteborg	0–1	0–3

26 September 2012
19:00

Barcelona (Spain)	0–3	(England) Arsenal
	Report	Beattie 31'; Nobbs 55'; Chapman 67'

Mini Estadi, Barcelona
Attendance: 1,354
Referee: Christine Baitinger (Germany)
4 October 2012
16:00

Arsenal (England)	4–0	(Spain) Barcelona
Beattie 53', 78', 90+3' (pen.); Little 57'	Report

Meadow Park, Borehamwood
Attendance: 662
Referee: Lilach Asulin (Israel)

Arsenal won 7–0 on aggregate.

26 September 2012
19:00

Standard Liège (Belgium)	1–3	(Germany) Turbine Potsdam
Coutereels 6'	Report	Andonova 15', 35'; Courtois 38' (o.g.)

Stade Maurice Dufrasne, Liège
Attendance: 3,905
Referee: Anastasia Pustovoitova (Russia)
3 October 2012
14:00

Turbine Potsdam (Germany)	5–0	(Belgium) Standard Liège
Andonova 18', 47', 90+3'; Ōgimi 45+3'; Añonma 87'	Report

Karl-Liebknecht-Stadion, Potsdam
Attendance: 2,460
Referee: Lina Lehtovaara (Finland)

Turbine Potsdam won 8–1 on aggregate.

26 September 2012
15:30

Apollon Limassol (Cyprus)	2–3	(Italy) Torres
Farrelly 17'; Rus 57'	Report	Panico 67', 85', 86'

Tsirion Stadium, Limassol
Attendance: 450
Referee: Riem Hussein (Germany)
3 October 2012
20:00

Torres (Italy)	3–1	(Cyprus) Apollon Limassol
Fuselli 26'; Iannella 65'; Manieri 81' (pen.)	Report	Rus 49'

Stadio Vanni Sanna, Sassari
Attendance: 1,122
Referee: Cristina Dorcioman (Romania)

Torres won 6–3 on aggregate.

26 September 2012
16:00

Olimpia Cluj (Romania)	1–1	(Austria) Neulengbach
Duşa 57'	Report	Gstöttner 84'

Cluj Arena, Cluj-Napoca
Attendance: 800
Referee: Christina W. Pedersen (Norway)
3 October 2012
19:30

Neulengbach (Austria)	2–2 (a.e.t.)	(Romania) Olimpia Cluj
Giovana 30'; Gstöttner 108'	Report	Lunca 81', 101'

Wienerwaldstadion, Neulengbach
Attendance: 1,150
Referee: Paloma Quintero Siles (Spain)

3–3 on aggregate. Olimpia Cluj won on away goals.

27 September 2012
16:00

Unia Racibórz (Poland)	1–5	(Germany) Wolfsburg
Chinasa 47'	Report	Müller 22', 46'; Jakabfi 67'; Pohlers 71', 78'

OSiR Racibórz, Racibórz
Attendance: 5,125
Referee: Rhona Daly (Ireland)
4 October 2012
18:00

Wolfsburg (Germany)	6–1	(Poland) Unia Racibórz
Pohlers 45+3', 48'; Kessler 56', 57'; Faißt 69'; Odebrecht 90+2'	Report	Tarczyńska 35'

VfL-Stadion am Elsterweg, Wolfsburg
Attendance: 785
Referee: Natalia Aleksakhina (Ukraine)

Wolfsburg won 11–2 on aggregate.

26 September 2012
13:00

BIIK Kazygurt (Kazakhstan)	0–4	(Norway) Røa
	Report	Andreassen 14', 45+1'; Thorsnes 15' Haavi 54'

BIIK Stadium, Shymkent
Attendance: 600
Referee: Monika Mularczyk (Poland)
4 October 2012
16:00

Røa (Norway)	4–0	(Kazakhstan) BIIK Kazygurt
Tårnes 6'; Thorsnes 29'; Kvaslvik 83', 85'	Report

RöA Stadium, Oslo
Attendance: 130
Referee: Dilan Gökçek (Turkey)

Røa won 8–0 on aggregate.

27 September 2012
16:00

SFK 2000 (Bosnia and Herzegovina)	0–3	(Czech Republic) Sparta Prague
	Report	L. Martínková 58', 85'; Voňková 68'

Asim Ferhatović Hase Stadium, Sarajevo
Attendance: 80
Referee: Florence Guillemin (France)
11 October 2012
15:00

Sparta Prague (Czech Republic)	3–0	(Bosnia and Herzegovina) SFK 2000
Voňková 10'; L. Martínková 72'; Danihelková 85'	Report

FK Viktoria Stadion, Prague
Attendance: 310
Referee: Pernilla Larsson (Sweden)

Sparta Prague won 6–0 on aggregate.

27 September 2012
19:00

ADO Den Haag (Netherlands)	1–4	(Russia) Rossiyanka
Jansen 75'	Report	Shlyapina 2' (pen.), 77' (pen.); Skotnikova 44', 63'

Zuiderpark Stadion, The Hague
Attendance: 500
Referee: Esther Azzopardi (Malta)
4 October 2012
13:00

Rossiyanka (Russia)	1–2	(Netherlands) ADO Den Haag
Shlyapina 9'	Report	Moudou 82'; Noyola 87'

Krasnoarmeysk Stadium, Krasnoarmeysk
Attendance: 250
Referee: Teodora Albon (Romania)

Rossiyanka won 5–3 on aggregate.

26 September 2012
22:00

Stjarnan (Iceland)	0–0	(Russia) Zorky Krasnogorsk
	Report

Stjörnuvöllur, Garðabær
Attendance: 678
Referee: Jenny Palmqvist (Sweden)
4 October 2012
13:00

Zorky Krasnogorsk (Russia)	3–1	(Iceland) Stjarnan
Djatel 33', 47'; Ruiz 60'	Report	E. Fridjónsdóttir 79'

Zorky Stadium, Krasnogorsk
Attendance: 200
Referee: Esther Staubli (Switzerland)

Zorky Krasnogorsk won 3–1 on aggregate.

26 September 2012
16:00

PK-35 Vantaa (Finland)	0–7	(France) Lyon
	Report	Tonazzi 13', 84'; Renard 24'; Le Sommer 36'; Dickenmann 44'; Majri 73'; Abily 90+1'

Myyrmäki Urheilupuisto, Vantaa
Attendance: 370
Referee: Aneliya Sinabova (Bulgaria)
3 October 2012
18:30

Lyon (France)	5–0	(Finland) PK-35 Vantaa
Abily 6'; Henry 40'; Bompastor 53'; Majri 68'; Nécib 88'	Report

Stade de Gerland, Lyon
Attendance: 5,276
Referee: Sofia Karagiorgi (Cyprus)

Lyon won 12–0 on aggregate.

27 September 2012
18:00

MTK (Hungary)	0–4	(Sweden) Malmö
	Report	Veje 3', 63'; Mittag 77', 87'

Hidegkuti Nándor Stadium, Budapest
Attendance: 1,100
Referee: Silvia Tea Spinelli (Italy)
3 October 2012
19:00

Malmö (Sweden)	6–1	(Hungary) MTK
Ørntoft 5'; Veje 26'; Rubensson 33', 65'; Anker-Kofoed 71', 79'	Report	Vágó 90+2' (pen.)

Malmö Stadion, Malmö
Attendance: 603
Referee: Natalia Avdonchenko (Russia)

Malmö won 10–1 on aggregate.

26 September 2012
15:00

Birmingham City (England)	2–0	(Italy) Bardolino Verona
Williams 51'; Harrop 70'	Report

DCS Stadium, Stratford upon Avon
Attendance: 212
Referee: Efthalia Mitsi (Greece)
3 October 2012
20:30

Bardolino Verona (Italy)	3–0 (a.e.t.)	(England) Birmingham City
Girelli 37' (pen.), 79', 112'	Report

Stadio Marc'Antonio Bentegodi, Verona
Attendance: 3,900
Referee: Bibiana Steinhaus (Germany)

Bardolino Verona won 3–2 on aggregate.

26 September 2012
19:00

Stabæk (Norway)	2–0	(Denmark) Brøndby
Stensland 47'; Hegerberg 50'	Report

Nadderud Stadion, Oslo
Attendance: 607
Referee: Linn Andersson (Sweden)
3 October 2012
18:30

Brøndby (Denmark)	3–3	(Norway) Stabæk
Christiansen 29', 60'; Munk 73' (pen.)	Report	Hegerberg 5'; Kaurin 27'; Stensland 32'

Brøndby Stadium, Brøndby
Attendance: 879
Referee: Kirsi Heikkinen (Finland)

Stabæk won 5–3 on aggregate.

25 September 2012
19:15

Zürich (Switzerland)	1–1	(France) Juvisy
Grings 90+1'	Report	Thiney 50'

Letzigrund, Zürich
Attendance: 2,871
Referee: Sandra Braz Bastos (Portugal)
4 October 2012
19:45

Juvisy (France)	1–0	(Switzerland) Zürich
Thiney 69' (pen.)	Report

Stade Léo Lagrange, Besançon
Attendance: 658
Referee: Gyöngyi Gaál (Hungary)

Juvisy won 2–1 on aggregate.

26 September 2012
20:00

Glasgow City (Scotland)	1–2	(Denmark) Fortuna Hjørring
J. Ross 76'	Report	Nadim 3', 31'

Petershill Park, Glasgow
Attendance: 460
Referee: Knarik Grigoryan (Armenia)
3 October 2012
20:15

Fortuna Hjørring (Denmark)	0–0	(Scotland) Glasgow City
	Report

Hjørring Stadium, Hjørring
Attendance: 817
Referee: Stéphanie Frappart (France)

Fortuna Hjørring won 2–1 on aggregate.

26 September 2012
15:00

Spartak Subotica (Serbia)	0–1	(Sweden) Göteborg
	Report	Levin 40'

Subotica City Stadium, Subotica
Attendance: 1,500
Referee: Zuzana Kováčová (Slovakia)
3 October 2012
19:00

Göteborg (Sweden)	3–0	(Serbia) Spartak Subotica
Schough 20', 35'; Press 69'	Report

Walhalla Stadium, Gothenburg
Attendance: 518
Referee: Marte Sørø (Norway)

Göteborg won 4–0 on aggregate.

== Round of 16 ==
Team 1	Agg.	Team 2	1st leg	2nd leg
Arsenal (England)	6–4	(Germany) Turbine Potsdam	2–1	4–3
Torres (Italy)	7–1	(Romania) Olimpia Cluj	4–1	3–0
Wolfsburg (Germany)	5–2	(Norway) Røa	4–1	1–1
Sparta Prague (Czech Republic)	2–3	(Russia) Rossiyanka	0–1	2–2
Zorky Krasnogorsk (Russia)	0–11	(France) Lyon	0–9	0–2
Malmö (Sweden)	3–0	(Italy) Bardolino Verona	1–0	2–0
Stabæk (Norway)	1–2	(France) Juvisy	0–0	1–2
Fortuna Hjørring (Denmark)	3–4	(Sweden) Göteborg	1–1	2–3

1 November 2012
15:00

Arsenal (England)	2–1	(Germany) Turbine Potsdam
Chapman 70'; White 82'	Report	Ōgimi 89'

Meadow Park, Borehamwood
Attendance: 832
Referee: Esther Azzopardi (Malta)
7 November 2012
18:00

Turbine Potsdam (Germany)	3–4	(England) Arsenal
Göransson 48', 59'; Winters 55'	Report	Smith 27', 34', 57'; White 81'

Karl-Liebknecht-Stadion, Potsdam
Attendance: 3,260
Referee: Carina Vitulano (Italy)

Arsenal won 6–4 on aggregate.

31 October 2012
20:00

Torres (Italy)	4–1	(Romania) Olimpia Cluj
Domenichetti 10'; Panico 24', 73', 85'	Report	Vătafu 51'

Stadio Vanni Sanna, Sassari
Attendance: 250
Referee: Christine Baitinger (Germany)
8 November 2012
17:00

Olimpia Cluj (Romania)	0–3	(Italy) Torres
	Report	Iannella 9'; Panico 62', 66'

Cluj Arena, Cluj-Napoca
Attendance: 1,000
Referee: Esther Staubli (Switzerland)

Torres won 7–1 on aggregate.

1 November 2012
17:00

Wolfsburg (Germany)	4–1	(Norway) Røa
Herregården 30' (o.g.); Jakabfi 40'; Popp 74'; Pohlers 81'	Report	Haavi 22'

VfL-Stadion am Elsterweg, Wolfsburg
Attendance: 685
Referee: Jana Adámková (Czech Republic)
7 November 2012
13:00

Røa (Norway)	1–1	(Germany) Wolfsburg
Johansen 31'	Report	Pohlers 33'

Nedre Eiker Stadion, Mjøndalen
Attendance: 65
Referee: Silvia Tea Spinelli (Italy)

Wolfsburg won 5–2 on aggregate.

1 November 2012
14:00

Sparta Prague (Czech Republic)	0–1	(Russia) Rossiyanka
	Report	Oparanozie 12'

Stadion SK Prosek, Prague
Attendance: 525
Referee: Christina W. Pedersen (Norway)
8 November 2012
14:00

Rossiyanka (Russia)	2–2	(Czech Republic) Sparta Prague
Vyštejnová 53' (o.g.); Fabiana 63'	Report	Voňková 3'; Danihelková 90+4'

Rodina Stadium, Khimki
Attendance: 100
Referee: Katalin Kulcsár (Hungary)

Rossiyanka won 3–2 on aggregate.

31 October 2012
16:00

Zorky Krasnogorsk (Russia)	0–9	(France) Lyon
	Report	Abily 14'; Nécib 20', 26', 62'; Henry 54', 84' (pen.); Tonazzi 69'; Kostyukova 78' (o.g.); Otaki 81'

Rodina Stadium, Khimki
Attendance: 200
Referee: Kirsi Heikkinen (Finland)
7 November 2012
18:00

Lyon (France)	2–0	(Russia) Zorky Krasnogorsk
Tonazzi 2'; Bompastor 41'	Report

Stade de Gerland, Lyon
Attendance: 6,420
Referee: Morag Pirie (Scotland)

Lyon won 11–0 on aggregate.

31 October 2012
19:00

Malmö (Sweden)	1–0	(Italy) Bardolino Verona
Mittag 2'	Report

Malmö Stadion, Malmö
Attendance: 521
Referee: Saša Ihringová (England)
7 November 2012
20:30

Bardolino Verona (Italy)	0–2	(Sweden) Malmö
	Report	Gunnarsdóttir 13'; Wilhelmsson 57'

Stadio Marc'Antonio Bentegodi, Verona
Attendance: 3,500
Referee: Teodora Albon (Romania)

Malmö won 3–0 on aggregate.

31 October 2012
19:00

Stabæk (Norway)	0–0	(France) Juvisy
	Report

Nadderud Stadion, Oslo
Attendance: 309
Referee: Natalia Avdonchenko (Russia)
8 November 2012
19:00

Juvisy (France)	2–1	(Norway) Stabæk
Cayman 40'; Soubeyrand 69'	Report	Moore 21'

Stade Léo Lagrange, Besançon
Attendance: 650
Referee: Efthalia Mitsi (Greece)

Juvisy won 2–1 on aggregate.

31 October 2012
18:30

Fortuna Hjørring (Denmark)	1–1	(Sweden) Göteborg
Nadim 65'	Report	Averbuch 72'

Hjørring Stadium, Hjørring
Attendance: 463
Referee: Kateryna Monzul (Ukraine)
7 November 2012
19:00

Göteborg (Sweden)	3–2	(Denmark) Fortuna Hjørring
Press 7', 73'; Schough 27'	Report	Arnth 37'; Junge 79'

Walhalla Stadium, Gothenburg
Attendance: 856
Referee: Cristina Dorcioman (Romania)

Göteborg won 4–3 on aggregate.

== Quarter-finals ==
There was an open draw held for the quarterfinals and the following rounds on 27 November 2012.

Team 1	Agg.	Team 2	1st leg	2nd leg
Arsenal (England)	4–1	(Italy) Torres	3–1	1–0
Wolfsburg (Germany)	4–1	(Russia) Rossiyanka	2–1	2–0
Lyon (France)	8–0	(Sweden) LdB Malmö	5–0	3–0
Juvisy (France)	4–1	(Sweden) Göteborg	1–0	3–1

20 March 2013
15:00

Arsenal (England)	3–1	(Italy) Torres
Smith 23'; Nobbs 49'; Little 63'	Report	Mändly 71'

Meadow Park, Borehamwood
Attendance: 600
Referee: Bibiana Steinhaus (Germany)
27 March 2013
14:30

Torres (Italy)	0–1	(England) Arsenal
	Report	Fahey 4'

Stadio Vanni Sanna, Sassari
Attendance: 3,150
Referee: Teodora Albon (Romania)

Arsenal won 4–1 on aggregate.

20 March 2013
18:00

Wolfsburg (Germany)	2–1	(Russia) Rossiyanka
Popp 5'; Müller 32'	Report	Henning 46' (o.g.)

Volkswagen Arena, Wolfsburg
Attendance: 1,971
Referee: Cristina Dorcioman (Romania)
28 March 2013
16:30

Rossiyanka (Russia)	0–2	(Germany) Wolfsburg
	Report	Pohlers 71'; Goeßling 88'

Luzhniki Stadium, Moscow
Attendance: 800
Referee: Kirsi Heikkinen (Finland)

Wolfsburg won 4–1 on aggregate.

20 March 2013
18:00

Lyon (France)	5–0	(Sweden) Malmö
Thomis 18'; Schelin 24', 62'; Abily 71'; Nécib 89'	Report

Stade de Gerland, Lyon
Attendance: 8,026
Referee: Esther Staubli (Switzerland)
28 March 2013
19:15

Malmö (Sweden)	0–3	(France) Lyon
	Report	Schelin 15'; Rapinoe 53'; Renard 89'

Malmö Stadion, Malmö
Attendance: 1,256
Referee: Kateryna Monzul (Ukraine)

Lyon won 8–0 on aggregate.

20 March 2013
20:00

Juvisy (France)	1–0	(Sweden) Göteborg
Machart 17'	Report

Stade Léo Lagrange, Besançon
Attendance: 800
Referee: Christine Baitinger (Germany)
27 March 2013
19:15

Göteborg (Sweden)	1–3	(France) Juvisy
Averbuch 65'	Report	Catala 77', 86'; Cayman 90+1'

Walhalla Stadium, Gothenburg
Attendance: 911
Referee: Silvia Tea Spinelli (Italy)

Juvisy won 4–1 on aggregate.

== Semi-finals ==
Team 1	Agg.	Team 2	1st leg	2nd leg
Arsenal (England)	1–4	(Germany) Wolfsburg	0–2	1–2
Lyon (France)	9–1	(France) Juvisy	3–0	6–1

14 April 2013
15:00

Arsenal (England)	0–2	(Germany) Wolfsburg
	Report	Pohlers 29'; Müller 85'

Meadow Park, Borehamwood
Attendance: 1,406
Referee: Kateryna Monzul (Ukraine)
21 April 2013
12:00

Wolfsburg (Germany)	2–1	(England) Arsenal
Wagner 14'; Keßler 61'	Report	Little 54'

Volkswagen Arena, Wolfsburg
Attendance: 8,173
Referee: Silvia Tea Spinelli (Italy)

Wolfsburg won 4–1 on aggregate.

13 April 2013
21:00

Lyon (France)	3–0	(France) Juvisy
Schelin 18', 90+3'; Renard 63'	Report

Stade de Gerland, Lyon
Attendance: 21,923
Referee: Efthalia Mitsi (Greece)
21 April 2013
16:30

Juvisy (France)	1–6	(France) Lyon
Diani 84'	Report	Rapinoe 6'; Schelin 19', 51'; Abily 63'; Tonazzi 71', 78'

Stade Robert Bobin, Bondoufle
Attendance: 11,612
Referee: Katalin Kulcsár (Hungary)

Lyon won 9–1 on aggregate.

== Final ==
23 May 2013
19:30 BST

Wolfsburg (Germany)	1–0	(France) Lyon
Müller 73' (pen.)	Report

Stamford Bridge, London
Attendance: 19,278
Referee: Teodora Albon (Romania)
