= 2013 FA WSL Cup =

Tournament details
- Country: England
- Dates: 23 March 2013 – 4 October 2013
- Teams: 8

Final positions
- Champions: Arsenal
- Runners-up: Lincoln

Tournament statistics
- Matches played: 15
- Goals scored: 40 (2.67 per match)
- Attendance: 10,356 (690 per match)
- Top goal scorer: (England) Ellen White Arsenal (5 Goals)

The 2013 FA WSL Cup was the third edition of the FA WSL's league cup competition. It was sponsored by Continental AG, who sponsored the competition from its creation, and was officially known as the FA WSL Continental Tyres Cup. All eight teams of the WSL took part in the competition.

Arsenal were the defending champions and the only club to have won the cup in the previous two seasons it was contested in.

The competition was played in the same format as the previous year. Arsenal won their third title in as many editions with a 2–0 win over Lincoln.

== Group stage ==
=== Group 1 ===
Pos	Team	Pld	W	D	L	GF	GA	GD	Pts	Qualification	ARS	LIN	BIR	BRI
1	Arsenal	3	2	1	0	7	4	+3	7	Advance to knock-out stage	—	—	2–1	4–2
2	Lincoln	3	1	2	0	3	2	+1	5	Advance to knock-out stage	1–1	—	—	—
3	Birmingham City	3	1	1	1	4	3	+1	4		—	1–1	—	—
4	Bristol Academy	3	0	0	3	2	7	−5	0		—	0–1	0–2	—

2 May 2013
19:00

Bristol Academy	0–2	Birmingham City
	Report	Williams 30'; Linnett 65'

Stoke Gifford Stadium, Filton
Attendance: 675
Referee: Adrian Quelch
2 May 2013
19:30

Lincoln	1–1	Arsenal
Clarke 23'	Report	White 82'

Sincil Bank, Lincoln
Attendance: 283
Referee: Stuart Richardson

5 May 2013
19:30

Bristol Academy	0–1	Lincoln
	Report	Hamilton 87'

Stoke Gifford Stadium, Filton
Attendance: 425
Referee: Thomas Blanch
11 May 2013
13:00

Arsenal	2–1	Birmingham City
Davison 50'; White 88'	report	Williams 48' (pen.)

Meadow Park, Borehamwood
Attendance: 479
Referee: Adam Crysell

19 May 2013
14:00

Arsenal	4–2	Bristol Academy
White 25'; Nobbs 49'; Carter 54'; Little 82'	Report	Watts 27'; Curson 42'

Meadow Park, Borehamwood
Attendance: 446
Referee: Anthony Da Costa
19 May 2013
14:00

Birmingham City	1–1	Lincoln
Williams 3'	Report	Cantrell 38'

Knights Lane, Tiddington
Attendance: 427
Referee: Robert Massey-Ellis

=== Group 2 ===
Pos	Team	Pld	W	D	L	GF	GA	GD	Pts	Qualification	LIV	EVE	DON	CHE
1	Liverpool	3	2	1	0	6	1	+5	7	Advance to knock-out stage	—	1–1	1–0	—
2	Everton	3	2	1	0	6	3	+3	7	Advance to knock-out stage	—	—	—	2–1
3	Doncaster Rovers Belles	3	0	1	2	2	5	−3	1		—	1–3	—	1–1
4	Chelsea	3	0	1	2	2	7	−5	1		0–4	—	—	—

23 March 2013
19:30

Liverpool	1–1	Everton
Fors 76' (pen.)	Report	Parris 87'

Halton Stadium, Widnes
Attendance: 1,432
Referee: Sian Massey
28 April 2013
18:00

Doncaster Rovers Belles	1–1	Chelsea
Sigsworth 4'		Vidarsdottir 45'

Keepmoat Stadium, Doncaster
Attendance: 179

4 May 2013
19:15

Liverpool	1–0	Doncaster Rovers Belles
Dowie 46'	Report

Halton Stadium, Widnes
Attendance: 471
Referee: Rob Goodwin-Davey
5 May 2013
14:00

Everton	2–1	Chelsea
Duggan 34'; Scott 90'	Report	Jakobsson 47'

Rossett Park, Crosby
Attendance: 257
Referee: Elizabeth Jane Simms

18 May 2013
18:00

Doncaster Rovers Belles	1–3	Everton
England 35'	Report	Parris 38'; Jones 71'; Duggan 90' (pen.)

Keepmoat Stadium, Doncaster
Attendance: 301
Referee: Duncan Street
19 May 2013
14:00

Chelsea	0–4	Liverpool
	Report	Rolser 28'; DaCosta 67'; Dowie 82'; Williams 85'

Wheatsheaf Park, Staines
Attendance: 349
Referee: Paul Kelly

== Knock-out stage ==
=== Bracket ===
Semi-finals
8 August – Borehamwood
Arsenal	4
Everton	0
7 August – Widnes
Liverpool	1 (2)
Lincoln (pen.)	1 (4)

Final
4 October – Barnet
Arsenal	2
Lincoln	0

=== Semi-finals ===
Team 1	Score	Team 2
Liverpool	1–1 (2–4 p)	Lincoln
Arsenal	4–0	Everton

7 August 2013
19:30

Liverpool	1–1	Lincoln
Dowie 1'	Report	Sweetman-Kirk 50'
Penalties
Williams (penalty scored); Dowie (penalty missed); Fors (penalty missed); Bonner (penalty scored)	2–4	(penalty scored) Stoney; (penalty scored) Allen; (penalty missed) Walton; (penalty scored) Clarke; (penalty scored) Cantrell

Halton Stadium, Widnes
Attendance: 507
Referee: Barry Lamb
8 August 2013
19:45

Arsenal	4–0	Everton
Nobbs 8'; Carter 35'; White 40'; Houghton 56'	Report

Meadow Park, Borehamwood
Attendance: 704

=== Final ===
4 October 2013
19:30

Arsenal	2–0	Lincoln
White 76'; Little 86'	Report

The Hive, Canons Park
Attendance: 3,421
Referee: Lisa Rashid

== See also ==
- 2013 FA WSL
