= 2011–12 UEFA Women's Champions League qualifying round =

Tournament details
- Dates: 11–16 August 2011
- Teams: 32

The 2011–12 UEFA Women's Champions League qualifying round was played on 11, 13 and 16 August 2011. A total of 32 teams competed in the qualifying round to decide 10 of the 32 places in the knockout phase of the 2011–12 UEFA Women's Champions League

== Seeding and draw ==
The draw was held on 23 June 2011. 32 teams entered in the qualifying round, and were divided into eight groups of four teams, with one team from each seeding pot:

Pot 1

- (Spain) Rayo Vallecano
- (Greece) PAOK
- (Poland) Unia Racibórz
- (Ukraine) Lehenda-ShVSM
- (Bulgaria) NSA Sofia
- (Portugal) 1° Dezembro (host)
- (Scotland) Glasgow City
- (Bosnia and Herzegovina) SFK 2000 (host)

Pot 2

- (Slovenia) Krka (host)
- (Hungary) MTK
- (Lithuania) Gintra Universitetas
- (Cyprus) Apollon Limassol (host)
- (Belarus) Bobruichanka
- (Faroe Islands) KÍ Klaksvík
- (Finland) PK-35 Vantaa (host)
- (Switzerland) YB Frauen

Pot 3

- (Serbia) Spartak Subotica (host)
- (Israel) ASA Tel Aviv University
- (Wales) Swansea City
- (Slovakia) Slovan Bratislava
- (Romania) Olimpia Cluj
- (Croatia) Osijek (host)
- (Republic of Ireland) Peamount United
- (Moldova) Goliador Chişinău

Pot 4

- (Northern Ireland) Newtownabbey Strikers
- (Turkey) Ataşehir Belediyesi
- (Estonia) Pärnu JK
- (North Macedonia) ZFK Naše Taksi (host)
- (Albania) Ada
- (Latvia) Liepājas Metalurgs
- (Malta) Mosta
- (Luxembourg) Progrès Niedercorn

The eight hosts were confirmed by UEFA before the draw, and two hosts could not be placed in the same group. Krka, Osijek and Apollon Limassol also hosted tournaments in 2009 and 2010.

Each team plays the other teams in the group once. The matches are to be played between 11 and 16 August 2011.

== Tie-breaker criteria ==
As usual in UEFA competitions, three points are awarded for a win, and one point for a draw. If teams are equal on points after all matches have been played, the following criteria applies:

1. Higher number of points obtained in the matches among the teams in question.
2. Superior goal difference resulting from the matches among the teams in question.
3. Higher number of goals scored in the matches among the teams in question.
4. Superior goal difference in all group matches
5. Higher number of goals scored in all group matches
6. Higher number of club coefficient points
7. Drawing of lots

Criteria 1–3 are reapplied until the tie cannot be resolved; only then is criteria 4 used.

== Groups ==
=== Group 1 ===
Pos	Team	Pld	W	D	L	GF	GA	GD	Pts	Qualification	YBF	NTA	PAOK	GOL
1	(Switzerland) YB Frauen	3	2	1	0	11	2	+9	7	Advance to main round	—	3–1	1–1	–
2	(North Macedonia) ZFK Naše Taksi (H)	3	2	0	1	8	3	+5	6		–	—	–	6–0
3	(Greece) PAOK	3	1	1	1	4	2	+2	4		–	0–1	—	3–0
4	(Moldova) Goliador Chişinău	3	0	0	3	0	16	−16	0		0–7	–	–	—

(H) Hosts
11 August 2011
17:00

PAOK (Greece)	3–0	(Moldova) Goliador Chişinău
Panteliadou 54', 62'; Dimitrijević 79'	Report

Stadion Blagoj Istatov, Strumica
Referee: Carina Vitulano (Italy)
11 August 2011
17:00

YB Frauen (Switzerland)	3–1	(North Macedonia) ZFK Naše Taksi
M. Wälti 45+3'; Stöckli 68'; Zahno 71'	Report	Rochi 52'

Stadion Kukuš, Strumica
Referee: Riem Hussein (Germany)

13 August 2011
17:00

PAOK (Greece)	0–1	(North Macedonia) ZFK Naše Taksi
	Report	Andreevska 42'

Stadion Blagoj Istatov, Strumica
Referee: Riem Hussein (Germany)
13 August 2011
17:00

Goliador Chişinău (Moldova)	0–7	(Switzerland) YB Frauen
	Report	Ismaili 4'; Heule 13', 45+2'; Stöckli 14'; L. Wälti 43'; Schenkel 86', 90+2'

Stadion Kukuš, Strumica
Referee: Jana Adámková (Czech Republic)

16 August 2011
17:00

YB Frauen (Switzerland)	1–1	(Greece) PAOK
Spahr 11'	Report	Dimitrijević 49'

Stadion Blagoj Istatov, Strumica
Referee: Carina Vitulano (Italy)
16 August 2011
17:00

ZFK Naše Taksi (North Macedonia)	6–0	(Moldova) Goliador Chişinău
Stankovska 45'; Brahimi 61', 62', 67'; Andreevska 63'; Naceva 73'	Report

Stadion Kukuš, Strumica
Referee: Jana Adámková (Czech Republic)

=== Group 2 ===
Pos	Team	Pld	W	D	L	GF	GA	GD	Pts	Qualification	ASA	DEZ	MTK	LIE
1	(Israel) ASA Tel Aviv University	3	2	1	0	6	2	+4	7	Advance to main round	—	–	1–0	–
2	(Portugal) 1° Dezembro (H)	3	1	2	0	5	1	+4	5		1–1	—	–	4–0
3	(Hungary) MTK	3	1	1	1	12	1	+11	4		–	0–0	—	12–0
4	(Latvia) Liepājas Metalurgs	3	0	0	3	1	20	−19	0		1–4	–	–	—

(H) Hosts
11 August 2011
13:00

MTK (Hungary)	12–0	(Latvia) Liepājas Metalurgs
Méry 44', 45+3', 60', 66'; Papp 51', 58', 65', 89'; Nagy 74', 90+1'; Godvár 77'; Gál 80'	Report

SU Sintrense Stadium, Sintra
Referee: Rhona Daly (Ireland)
11 August 2011
18:00

1° Dezembro (Portugal)	1–1	(Israel) ASA Tel Aviv University
Carvalhas 83'	Report	Lavi 90+5'

SU Sintrense Stadium, Sintra
Referee: Efthalia Mitsi (Greece)

13 August 2011
13:00

ASA Tel Aviv University (Israel)	1–0	(Hungary) MTK
Shenar 84'	Report

SU Sintrense Stadium, Sintra
Referee: Pernilla Larsson (Sweden)
13 August 2011
18:00

1° Dezembro (Portugal)	4–0	(Latvia) Liepājas Metalurgs
Matos 4'; Caleja 45+1'; Alves 70'; Couto 83'	Report

SU Sintrense Stadium, Sintra
Referee: Rhona Daly (Ireland)

16 August 2011
17:00

MTK (Hungary)	0–0	(Portugal) 1° Dezembro
	Report

SU Sintrense Stadium, Sintra
Referee: Efthalia Mitsi (Greece)
16 August 2011
17:00

Liepājas Metalurgs (Latvia)	1–4	(Israel) ASA Tel Aviv University
Greijere 88'	Report	Israel 55'; Cohen 60'; Jan 69', 90+2'

Estádio Pina Manique, Lisbon
Referee: Pernilla Larsson (Sweden)

=== Group 3 ===
Pos	Team	Pld	W	D	L	GF	GA	GD	Pts	Qualification	RVA	PEA	PAR	KRK
1	(Spain) Rayo Vallecano	3	3	0	0	9	1	+8	9	Advance to main round	—	1–0	4–1	–
2	(Republic of Ireland) Peamount United	3	2	0	1	12	2	+10	6	Advance to main round	–	—	–	7–0
3	(Estonia) Pärnu JK	3	1	0	2	4	10	−6	3		–	1–5	—	–
4	(Slovenia) Krka (H)	3	0	0	3	1	13	−12	0		0–4	–	1–2	—

(H) Hosts
11 August 2011
15:45

Rayo Vallecano (Spain)	1–0	(Republic of Ireland) Peamount United
Natalia 90'	Report

Matija Gubec Stadium, Krško
Referee: Katalin Kulcsár (Hungary)
11 August 2011
20:45

Krka (Slovenia)	1–2	(Estonia) Pärnu JK
Benak 90+2'	Report	Lilleste 25'; Morkovkina 66'

Matija Gubec Stadium, Krško
Referee: Simona Ghisletta (Switzerland)

13 August 2011
15:45

Rayo Vallecano (Spain)	4–1	(Estonia) Pärnu JK
Jennifer 43', 51'; Pilar 60'; Albita 68'	Report	Palmaru 10'

Matija Gubec Stadium, Krško
Referee: Gordana Kuzmanović (Serbia)
13 August 2011
20:45

Peamount United (Republic of Ireland)	7–0	(Slovenia) Krka
Roche 18', 33'; Lawlor 31', 78'; Quinn 37', 52', 65'	Report

Matija Gubec Stadium, Krško
Referee: Simona Ghisletta (Switzerland)

16 August 2011
17:00

Krka (Slovenia)	0–4	(Spain) Rayo Vallecano
	Report	Jennifer 12', 58', 82'; Pilar 79'

Matija Gubec Stadium, Krško
Referee: Katalin Kulcsár (Hungary)
16 August 2011
17:00

Pärnu JK (Estonia)	1–5	(Republic of Ireland) Peamount United
Ivanova 56'	Report	Jenkins 5'; Lawlor 30', 33'; Roche 80', 90+2'

Ivančna Gorica Stadium, Ivančna Gorica
Referee: Gordana Kuzmanović (Serbia)

=== Group 4 ===
Pos	Team	Pld	W	D	L	GF	GA	GD	Pts	Qualification	CLU	2KS	ABE	GIN
1	(Romania) Olimpia Cluj	3	3	0	0	12	2	+10	9	Advance to main round	—	–	–	5–0
2	(Bosnia and Herzegovina) SFK 2000 (H)	3	2	0	1	7	5	+2	6		1–3	—	4–1	–
3	(Turkey) Ataşehir Belediyesi	3	0	1	2	3	9	−6	1		1–4	–	—	–
4	(Lithuania) Gintra Universitetas	3	0	1	2	2	8	−6	1		–	1–2	1–1	—

(H) Hosts
11 August 2011
11:00

Gintra Universitetas (Lithuania)	1–1	(Turkey) Ataşehir Belediyesi
Budrytė 38'	Report	Stasiulytė 29' (o.g.)

Koševo City Stadium, Sarajevo
Referee: Elia Martínez (Spain)
11 August 2011
16:30

SFK 2000 (Bosnia and Herzegovina)	1–3	(Romania) Olimpia Cluj
Hamzić 61'	Report	Duşa 4', 53'; Giurgiu 78'

Koševo City Stadium, Sarajevo
Referee: Esther Azzopardi (Malta)

13 August 2011
11:00

Olimpia Cluj (Romania)	5–0	(Lithuania) Gintra Universitetas
Cosma 33', 43'; Vătafu 41'; Duşa 80', 90+5'	Report

Koševo City Stadium, Sarajevo
Referee: Anja Kunick (Germany)
13 August 2011
16:30

SFK 2000 (Bosnia and Herzegovina)	4–1	(Turkey) Ataşehir Belediyesi
Kršo 10', 51'; Fetahović 43'; Hršum 75'	Report	Aladağ 71'

Koševo City Stadium, Sarajevo
Referee: Elia Martínez (Spain)

16 August 2011
17:00

Gintra Universitetas (Lithuania)	1–2	(Bosnia and Herzegovina) SFK 2000
Budrytė 27'	Report	Salkanović 33'; Ivanović 85'

Stadion Grbavica, Sarajevo
Referee: Esther Azzopardi (Malta)
16 August 2011
17:00

Ataşehir Belediyesi (Turkey)	1–4	(Romania) Olimpia Cluj
Aladağ 26'	Report	Duşa 24'; Lunca 64', 77'; Cosma 85'

Koševo City Stadium, Sarajevo
Referee: Anja Kunick (Germany)

=== Group 5 ===
Pos	Team	Pld	W	D	L	GF	GA	GD	Pts	Qualification	GLA	SUB	KIK	MOS
1	(Scotland) Glasgow City	3	3	0	0	17	0	+17	9	Advance to main round	—	4–0	–	8–0
2	(Serbia) Spartak Subotica (H)	3	2	0	1	15	6	+9	6		–	—	4–2	–
3	(Faroe Islands) KÍ Klaksvík	3	1	0	2	3	9	−6	3		0–5	–	—	1–0
4	(Malta) Mosta	3	0	0	3	0	20	−20	0		–	0–11	–	—

(H) Hosts
11 August 2011
15:00

KÍ Klaksvík (Faroe Islands)	1–0	(Malta) Mosta
Purkhús 59'	Report

Subotica City Stadium, Subotica
Referee: Sofia Karagiorgi (Cyprus)
11 August 2011
17:30

Glasgow City (Scotland)	4–0	(Serbia) Spartak Subotica
Murray 7', 28'; Lindner 23', 90+3'	Report

Subotica City Stadium, Subotica
Referee: Kateryna Monzul (Ukraine)

13 August 2011
15:00

Glasgow City (Scotland)	8–0	(Malta) Mosta
J. Ross 15', 47'; Mitchell 33'; Dalziel 38'; L. Ross 42'; Wooley 51'; Evans 60'; Corsie 84'	Report

Subotica City Stadium, Subotica
Referee: Sofia Karagiorgi (Cyprus)
13 August 2011
17:30

Spartak Subotica (Serbia)	4–2	(Faroe Islands) KÍ Klaksvík
Damjanović 1', 67'; Ilić 55'; Čubrilo 76'	Report	Purkhús 14', 41'

Subotica City Stadium, Subotica
Referee: Ausra Kance (Lithuania)

16 August 2011
17:00

KÍ Klaksvík (Faroe Islands)	0–5	(Scotland) Glasgow City
	Report	Lindner 4', 8'; L. Ross 13'; Love 41'; McSorley 64'

Stadion Backa, Subotica
Referee: Kateryna Monzul (Ukraine)
16 August 2011
17:00

Mosta (Malta)	0–11	(Serbia) Spartak Subotica
	Report	Damjanović 1', 28', 48', 51'; Čubrilo 4', 6', 34', 37', 53'; Jovanović 45+1'; Čanković 67'

Subotica City Stadium, Subotica
Referee: Ausra Kance (Lithuania)

=== Group 6 ===
Pos	Team	Pld	W	D	L	GF	GA	GD	Pts	Qualification	P35	SBR	UNR	ADA
1	(Finland) PK-35 Vantaa (H)	3	2	1	0	12	1	+11	7	Advance to main round	—	–	1–1	10–0
2	(Slovakia) Slovan Bratislava	3	2	0	1	17	1	+16	6		0–1	—	–	–
3	(Poland) Unia Racibórz	3	1	1	1	9	2	+7	4		–	0–1	—	8–0
4	(Albania) Ada	3	0	0	3	0	34	−34	0		–	0–16	–	—

(H) Hosts
11 August 2011
14:30

Unia Racibórz (Poland)	0–1	(Slovakia) Slovan Bratislava
	Report	Šušková 45+1'

Myyrmäen jalkapallostadion, Vantaa
Referee: Lilach Asulin (Israel)
11 August 2011
18:30

PK-35 Vantaa (Finland)	10–0	(Albania) Ada
Sormunen 9'; Parikka 13', 15', 34', 44'; Saarinen 38', 45+1'; Vlasoff 55'; Hirvonen 60'; Jåfs 64'	Report

Myyrmäen jalkapallostadion, Vantaa
Referee: Olga Tanschi (Moldova)

13 August 2011
12:30

Slovan Bratislava (Slovakia)	0–1	(Finland) PK-35 Vantaa
	Report	Seppälä 76'

Myyrmäen jalkapallostadion, Vantaa
Referee: Olga Tanschi (Moldova)
13 August 2011
17:00

Unia Racibórz (Poland)	8–0	(Albania) Ada
Leśnik 1'; Landeka 8'; Chudzik 13', 81'; Paco 56' (o.g.); Tarczyńska 72', 73'; Pożerska 90+1'	Report

Brahenkenttä, Helsinki
Referee: Morag Pirie (Scotland)

16 August 2011
17:00

PK-35 Vantaa (Finland)	1–1	(Poland) Unia Racibórz
Seppälä 22'	Report	Chinasa 28'

Myyrmäen jalkapallostadion, Vantaa
Referee: Lilach Asulin (Israel)
16 August 2011
17:00

Ada (Albania)	0–16	(Slovakia) Slovan Bratislava
	Report	Balážiková 6', 21'; Mravíková 11', 44', 90+1'; Klechová 12', 87'; Šušková 14', 42', 50'; Fecková 28', 35', 54', 78', 83'; Vargovčiková 57'

Brahenkenttä, Helsinki
Referee: Morag Pirie (Scotland)

=== Group 7 ===
Matches were played at Stelios Kyriakides Stadium, Paphos, at GSZ Stadium, Larnaca, and Tsirio Stadium, Limassol.

Pos	Team	Pld	W	D	L	GF	GA	GD	Pts	Qualification	APL	LSH	SWA	PNI
1	(Cyprus) Apollon Limassol (H)	3	3	0	0	24	1	+23	9	Advance to main round	—	2–1	–	14–0
2	(Ukraine) Lehenda-ShVSM	3	2	0	1	11	2	+9	6		–	—	2–0	8–0
3	(Wales) Swansea City	3	1	0	2	4	10	−6	3		0–8	–	—	–
4	(Luxembourg) Progrès Niedercorn	3	0	0	3	0	26	−26	0		–	–	0–4	—

(H) Hosts
11 August 2011
16:30

Lehenda-ShVSM (Ukraine)	2–0	(Wales) Swansea City
Kornievets 86'; Melkonyants 90'	Report

Stelios Kyriakides Stadium, Paphos
Referee: Sandra Braz Bastos (Portugal)
11 August 2011
16:30

Apollon Limassol (Cyprus)	14–0	(Luxembourg) Progrès Niedercorn
Rus 4', 12', 43'; Solomou 6', 17'; Kostova 10', 14'; Lauder 53', 74', 88'; Spânu 58', 71'; Sofocleous 85'; Olăr 90'	Report

GSZ Stadium, Larnaca
Referee: Karolina Radzik-Johan (Poland)

13 August 2011
16:30

Lehenda-ShVSM (Ukraine)	8–0	(Luxembourg) Progrès Niedercorn
Gnydyuk 12'; Stankevich 18'; Kornievets 20', 26', 56'; Melkonyants 60'; Ovdiychuk 68'; Shramok 80'	Report

Stelios Kyriakides Stadium, Paphos
Referee: Karolina Radzik-Johan (Poland)
13 August 2011
16:30

Swansea City (Wales)	0–8	(Cyprus) Apollon Limassol
	Report	Rus 12', 45'; Kostova 29'; Lauder 39', 58'; Spânu 62'; Solomou 76'; Laiu 80'

GSZ Stadium, Larnaca
Referee: Zuzana Kováčová (Slovakia)

16 August 2011
16:30

Apollon Limassol (Cyprus)	2–1	(Ukraine) Lehenda-ShVSM
Kostova 78'; Rus 89'	Report	Vaschenko 45+3'

Tsirio Stadium, Limassol
Referee: Sandra Braz Bastos (Portugal)
16 August 2011
16:30

Progrès Niedercorn (Luxembourg)	0–4	(Wales) Swansea City
	Report	O'Connor 34'; Richardson 53'; Britton 87'; Passmore 90+1'

Stelios Kyriakides Stadium, Paphos
Referee: Zuzana Kováčová (Slovakia)

=== Group 8 ===
Pos	Team	Pld	W	D	L	GF	GA	GD	Pts	Qualification	OSI	BOB	NSA	CNS
1	(Croatia) Osijek (H)	3	2	1	0	7	2	+5	7	Advance to main round	—	1–0	–	–
2	(Belarus) Bobruichanka	3	2	0	1	10	1	+9	6	Advance to main round	–	—	3–0	7–0
3	(Bulgaria) NSA Sofia	3	1	1	1	2	4	−2	4		1–1	–	—	1–0
4	(Northern Ireland) Newtownabbey Strikers	3	0	0	3	1	13	−12	0		1–5	–	–	—

(H) Hosts
11 August 2011
17:00

Bobruichanka (Belarus)	7–0	(Northern Ireland) Newtownabbey Strikers
Tretyakova 14', 22', 56' (pen.); Luchenok 21'; Loginova 44', 78'; Gromolyuk 89'	Report

Gradski Vrt Stadium, Osijek
Referee: Knarik Grigoryan (Armenia)
11 August 2011
20:00

NSA Sofia (Bulgaria)	1–1	(Croatia) Osijek
Gospodinova 49'	Report	Šalek 4'

Gradski Vrt Stadium, Osijek
Referee: Teodora Albon (Romania)

13 August 2011
17:00

NSA Sofia (Bulgaria)	1–0	(Northern Ireland) Newtownabbey Strikers
Radoyska 10'	Report

Gradski Vrt Stadium, Osijek
Referee: Knarik Grigoryan (Armenia)
13 August 2011
20:00

Osijek (Croatia)	1–0	(Belarus) Bobruichanka
Kalamiza 8'	Report

Gradski Vrt Stadium, Osijek
Referee: Dilan Gökçek (Turkey)

16 August 2011
17:00

Bobruichanka (Belarus)	3–0	(Bulgaria) NSA Sofia
Manzhuk 9', 70'; Tretyakova 53'	Report

Stadion HNK Cibalia, Vinkovci
Referee: Teodora Albon (Romania)
16 August 2011
17:00

Newtownabbey Strikers (Northern Ireland)	1–5	(Croatia) Osijek
McCarthy 70'	Report	Šalek 14'; Joščak 22', 63' (pen.); Baban 67'; Lojna 90+3'

Gradski Vrt Stadium, Osijek
Referee: Dilan Gökçek (Turkey)

=== Ranking of group runners-up ===
The two best runners-up also qualify for the round of 32. The match against the fourth-placed team in the group does not count for the purposes of the runners-up table. The tie-breakers in this ranking are:

1. Higher number of points obtained
2. Superior goal difference
3. Higher number of goals scored
4. Higher number of club coefficient points
5. Fair play conduct in all group matches

Pos	Grp	Team	Pld	W	D	L	GF	GA	GD	Pts	Qualification
1	3	(Republic of Ireland) Peamount United	2	1	0	1	5	2	+3	3	Advance to main round
2	8	(Belarus) Bobruichanka	2	1	0	1	3	1	+2	3	Advance to main round
3	4	(Bosnia and Herzegovina) SFK 2000	2	1	0	1	5	4	+1	3	
4	7	(Ukraine) Lehenda-ShVSM	2	1	0	1	3	2	+1	3	
5	6	(Slovakia) Slovan Bratislava	2	1	0	1	1	1	0	3	
6	1	(North Macedonia) ZFK Naše Taksi	2	1	0	1	2	3	−1	3	
7	5	(Serbia) Spartak Subotica	2	1	0	1	4	6	−2	3	
8	2	(Portugal) 1° Dezembro	2	0	2	0	1	1	0	2	

Debutants Peamount and 2004–05 quarter-finalists Bobruichanka qualified for the round of 32 as best runners-up.
