= 2011–12 UEFA Women's Champions League knockout phase =

Tournament details
- Dates: 27 September 2011 – 17 May 2012
- Teams: 32

The 2011–12 UEFA Women's Champions League knockout phase began on 27 September 2011 and concluded on 17 May 2012 with the final at Olympiastadion in Munich, Germany to decide the champions of the 2011–12 UEFA Women's Champions League. A total of 32 teams competed in the knockout phase.

== Round and draw dates ==
UEFA has scheduled the competition as follows.

Round	Draw	First leg	Second leg
Round of 32	23 August 2011	27–29 September 2011	5–6 October 2011
Round of 16	23 August 2011	2–3 November 2011	9–10 November 2011
Quarterfinal	17 November 2011	14–15 March 2012	21–22 March 2012
Semifinal	17 November 2011	14–15 April 2012	21–22 April 2012
Final	17 November 2011	17 May 2012	

== Format ==
The knockout phase involved 32 teams: 22 teams which qualified directly, and 10 teams which qualified from the qualifying round (eight group winners and two best runners-up).

Each tie in the knockout phase, apart from the final, was played over two legs, with each team playing one leg at home. The team that scored more goals on aggregate over the two legs advanced to the next round. If the aggregate score was level, the away goals rule was applied, i.e. the team that scored more goals away from home over the two legs advanced. If away goals were also equal, then 30 minutes of extra time were played. The away goals rule was again applied after extra time, i.e. if there were goals scored during extra time and the aggregate score was still level, the visiting team advanced by virtue of more away goals scored. If no goals were scored during extra time, the tie was decided by a penalty shoot-out. In the final, which was played as a single match, if scores were level at the end of normal time, extra time was played, followed by a penalty shoot-out if scores remained tied.

The mechanism of the draws for each round was as follows:

- In the draw for the round of 32, 16 teams were seeded and 16 teams were unseeded, based on their UEFA club coefficients at the beginning of the season. The seeded teams were drawn against the unseeded teams, with the seeded teams hosting the second leg. Teams from the same group or the same association could not be drawn against each other.
- In the draws for the round of 16 onwards, there were no seedings, and teams from the same group or the same association could be drawn against each other.

== Bracket ==
As there were two draws, one for Round of 32 and 16 and another draw for the Quarter-finals to the final, the bracket has been created in retrospect.

Round of 32
(Cyprus) Apollon	2	1	3
(Czech Republic) Sparta Prague	2	2	4
(Romania) Olimpia Cluj	0	0	0
(France) Lyon	9	3	12
(Belgium) Standard Liège	0	4	4
(Denmark) Brøndby	2	3	5
(Israel) ASA Tel Aviv	0	2	2
(Italy) Torres	2	3	5
(Iceland) Þór/KA	0	2	2
(Germany) Turbine Potsdam	6	8	14
(Scotland) Glasgow City	1	3	4
(Iceland) Valur	1	0	1
(England) Bristol Academy	1	2	3
(Russia) Energiya Voronezh	1	4	5
(Netherlands) Twente	0	0	0
(Russia) Rossiyanka	2	1	3
(Finland) PK-35 Vantaa	1	0	1
(Spain) Rayo Vallecano	4	3	7
(Belarus) Bobruichanka	0	0	0
(England) Arsenal	4	6	10
(Switzerland) YB Frauen	0	1	1
(Denmark) Fortuna Hjørring	3	2	5
(Croatia) Osijek	0	0	0
(Sweden) Göteborg	4	7	11
(Kazakhstan) CSHVSM	2	0	2
(Austria) Neulengbach	1	5	6
(Italy) Tavagnacco	2	0	2
(Sweden) Malmö	1	5	6
(Norway) Stabæk	1	1	2
(Germany) Frankfurt	0	4	4
(Republic of Ireland) Peamount	0	0	0
(France) PSG	2	3	5

Round of 16
(Czech Republic) Sparta Prague	0	0	0
(France) Lyon	6	6	12
(Denmark) Brøndby	2	3	5
(Italy) Torres	1	1	2
(Germany) Turbine Potsdam	10	7	17
(Scotland) Glasgow City	0	0	0
(Russia) Energiya Voronezh	0	3	3
(Russia) Rossiyanka	4	3	7
(Spain) Rayo Vallecano	1	1	2
(England) Arsenal	1	5	6
(Denmark) Fortuna Hjørring	0	2	2
(Sweden) Göteborg	1	3	4
(Austria) Neulengbach	1	0	1
(Sweden) Malmö	3	1	4
(Germany) Frankfurt	3	1	4
(France) PSG	0	2	2

Quarter-finals
(France) Lyon	4	4	8
(Denmark) Brøndby	0	0	0
(Germany) Turbine Potsdam	2	3	5
(Russia) Rossiyanka	0	0	0
(England) Arsenal	3	0	3
(Sweden) Göteborg	1	1	2
(Sweden) Malmö	1	0	1
(Germany) Frankfurt	0	3	3

Semi-finals
(France) Lyon	5	0	5
(Germany) Turbine Potsdam	1	0	1
(England) Arsenal	1	0	1
(Germany) Frankfurt	2	2	4

Final
(France) Lyon	2
(Germany) Frankfurt	0

== Round of 32 ==
Of the 32 teams that will participate in this round, 22 are directly qualified, and the last 10 qualify from the qualification groups above. Eight as group winners, and two as the best runners-up. When determining the best runners-up, matches against the fourth placed team in the group is not taken into account. 16 seeded teams will be drawn against 16 unseeded teams. The title holder is the number 1 seed all other are seeded by their UEFA coefficient. The following teams are qualified for the round of 32.

The round of 32 and round of 16 were drawn on 23 August 2011 at UEFA headquarters. In the round of 32 no teams from the same country could be drawn against each other, same with teams from the same qualifying group. A change made to last year, when Breiðablik UBK and FCF Juvisy met in qualifying and the round of 32. There are no restrictions to the round of 16. Seeded teams play their second leg at home.

Team 1	Agg.	Team 2	1st leg	2nd leg
Apollon Limassol (Cyprus)	3–4	(Czech Republic) Sparta Prague	2–2	1–2
Olimpia Cluj (Romania)	0–12	(France) Lyon	0–9	0–3
Standard Liège (Belgium)	4–5	(Denmark) Brøndby	0–2	4–3
ASA Tel Aviv University (Israel)	2–5	(Italy) Torres	0–2	2–3
Þór/KA (Iceland)	2–14	(Germany) Turbine Potsdam	0–6	2–8
Glasgow City (Scotland)	4–1	(Iceland) Valur	1–1	3–0
Bristol Academy (England)	3–5	(Russia) Energiya Voronezh	1–1	2–4
Twente (Netherlands)	0–3	(Russia) Rossiyanka	0–2	0–1
PK-35 Vantaa (Finland)	1–7	(Spain) Rayo Vallecano	1–4	0–3
Bobruichanka (Belarus)	0–10	(England) Arsenal	0–4	0–6
YB Frauen (Switzerland)	1–5	(Denmark) Fortuna Hjørring	0–3	1–2
Osijek (Croatia)	0–11	(Sweden) Göteborg	0–4	0–7
CSHVSM (Kazakhstan)	2–6	(Austria) Neulengbach	2–1	0–5
Tavagnacco (Italy)	2–6	(Sweden) Malmö	2–1	0–5
Stabæk (Norway)	2–4	(Germany) Frankfurt	1–0	1–4
Peamount United (Republic of Ireland)	0–5	(France) Paris Saint-Germain	0–2	0–3

28 September 2011
18:00

Apollon Limassol (Cyprus)	2–2	(Czech Republic) Sparta Prague
Kostova 16'; Rus 64'	Report	L. Martínková 10'; Danihelková 90+2'

Tsirion Stadium, Limassol
Attendance: 800
Referee: Christina W. Pedersen (Norway)
5 October 2011
17:00

Sparta Prague (Czech Republic)	2–1	(Cyprus) Apollon Limassol
L. Martínková 3', 40'	Report	Solomou 7'

Areál SK Aritma, Prague
Attendance: 380
Referee: Anastasia Pustovoitova (Russia)

Sparta Prague won 4–3 on aggregate.

28 September 2011
15:30

Olimpia Cluj (Romania)	0–9	(France) Lyon
	Report	Schelin 12'; Le Sommer 17' (pen.), 22', 24'; Bompastor 32'; Renard 38'; Thomis 39'; Cruz Traña 44'; Majri 85'

Stadionul Dr. Constantin Rădulescu, Cluj-Napoca
Attendance: 1,157
Referee: Knarik Grigoryan (Armenia)
5 October 2011
19:00

Lyon (France)	3–0	(Romania) Olimpia Cluj
Abily 15', 82'; Le Sommer 51'	Report

Stade de Gerland, Lyon
Attendance: 6,863
Referee: Petra Chudá (Slovakia)

Lyon won 12–0 on aggregate.

27 September 2011
14:00

Standard Liège (Belgium)	0–2	(Denmark) Brøndby
	Report	Munk 8'; Christiansen 43'

Stade Maurice Dufrasne, Liège
Attendance: 2,400
Referee: Bibiana Steinhaus (Germany)
6 October 2011
18:30

Brøndby (Denmark)	3–4	(Belgium) Standard Liège
Munk 9', 45'; Rydahl Bukh 39'	Report	Zeler 44', 47'; Demoustier 66'; Martens 79'

Brøndby Stadium, Brøndby
Attendance: 2,270
Referee: Cristina Dorcioman (Romania)

Brøndby won 5–4 on aggregate.

27 September 2011
17:00

ASA Tel Aviv (Israel)	0–2	(Italy) Torres
	Report	Maendly 49'; Panico 69'

Ness Ziona Stadium, Ness Ziona
Attendance: 159
Referee: Jana Adámková (Czech Republic)
5 October 2011
12:00

Torres (Italy)	3–2	(Israel) ASA Tel Aviv
Ravitz 29' (o.g.); Panico 51'; Maglia 70'	Report	Jan 12'; Shenar 45'

Vanni Sanna, Sassari
Attendance: 456
Referee: Esther Azzopardi (Malta)

Torres won 5–2 on aggregate.

28 September 2011
18:15

Þór/KA (Iceland)	0–6	(Germany) Turbine Potsdam
	Report	Ásgrímsdóttir 11' (o.g.); Nagasato 13', 50', 57'; Peter 74'; Añonma 76'

Þórsvöllur, Akureyri
Attendance: 530
Referee: Katalin Kulcsár (Hungary)
5 October 2011
19:00

Turbine Potsdam (Germany)	8–2	(Iceland) Þór/KA
I. Kerschowski 2', 90+1'; Mittag 8', 20'; Hanebeck 18'; Zietz 55' (pen.); Göransson 56'; Hardardóttir 78' (o.g.)	Report	Ásgrímsdóttir 34'; Caldwell 75'

Karl-Liebknecht-Stadion, Potsdam
Attendance: 1,530
Referee: Efthalia Mitsi (Greece)

Turbine Potsdam won 14–2 on aggregate.

29 September 2011
20:45

Glasgow City (Scotland)	1–1	(Iceland) Valur
Evans 16'	Report	Ólafsdóttir 59'

Petershill Park, Glasgow
Attendance: 738
Referee: Sandra Braz Bastos (Portugal)
6 October 2011
18:00

Valur (Iceland)	0–3	(Scotland) Glasgow City
	Report	Gísladóttir 11' (o.g.); Evans 60', 62'

Hlíðarendi, Reykjavík
Attendance: 245
Referee: Gyöngyi Gaál (Hungary)

Glasgow City won 4–1 on aggregate.

29 September 2011
20:30

Bristol Academy (England)	1–1	(Russia) Energy Voronezh
Fishlock 76'	Report	Conti 84' (pen.)

Ashton Gate, Bristol
Attendance: 1,556
Referee: Floarea Ionescu (Romania)
5 October 2011
17:00

Energy Voronezh (Russia)	4–2	(England) Bristol Academy
Mashina 14', 31'; Boquete 70'; Conti 87'	Report	Heatherson 28'; Curson 90+4'

Tsentralnyi Profsoyuz Stadion, Voronezh
Attendance: 4,800
Referee: Esther Staubli (Switzerland)

Energy Voronezh won 5–3 on aggregate.

28 September 2011
19:00

Twente (Netherlands)	0–2	(Russia) Rossiyanka
	Report	Cristiane 85'; Jakobsson 90+5'

De Adelaarshorst, Deventer
Attendance: 2,481
Referee: Carina Vitulano (Italy)
6 October 2011
14:00

Rossiyanka (Russia)	1–0	(Netherlands) Twente
Cristiane 87'	Report

Krasnoarmeysk Stadium, Krasnoarmeysk
Attendance: 900
Referee: Kirsi Heikkinen (Finland)

Rossiyanka won 3–0 on aggregate.

28 September 2011
18:00

PK-35 Vantaa (Finland)	1–4	(Spain) Rayo Vallecano
Seppälä 80'	Report	Keka 25'; Jennifer 42'; Natalia 67'; Saray 85'

ISS Stadion, Vantaa
Attendance: 1,438
Referee: Kateryna Monzul (Ukraine)
6 October 2011
19:00

Rayo Vallecano (Spain)	3–0	(Finland) PK-35 Vantaa
Natalia 28'; Jade 64' Chini 89'	Report

Ciudad Deportiva Fundación Rayo Vallecano, Madrid
Attendance: 600
Referee: Silvia Tea Spinelli (Italy)

Rayo Vallecano won 7–1 on aggregate.

29 September 2011
14:00

Bobruichanka (Belarus)	0–4	(England) Arsenal
	Report	White 9'; Nobbs 64'; Beattie 76'; Chapman 88' (pen.)

Spartak Stadium, Bobruisk
Attendance: 2,050
Referee: Pernilla Larsson (Sweden)
5 October 2011
17:00

Arsenal (England)	6–0	(Belarus) Bobruichanka
Carter 13', 30'; Chapman 41'; Beattie 57', 60'; Nobbs 65'	Report

Meadow Park, Borehamwood
Attendance: 209
Referee: Séverine Zinck (France)

Arsenal won 10–0 on aggregate.

28 September 2011
20:00

YB Frauen (Switzerland)	0–3	(Denmark) Fortuna Hjørring
	Report	Khamis 11'; Petersen 58' (pen.); Jensen 90+2'

Stade de Suisse, Bern
Attendance: 2,046
Referee: Natalia Avdonchenko (Russia)
5 October 2011
19:00

Fortuna Hjørring (Denmark)	2–1	(Switzerland) YB Frauen
Carroll 86'; Pedersen 88'	Report	L. Wälti 34'

Hjørring Stadion, Hjørring
Attendance: 1,062
Referee: Rhona Daly (Ireland)

Fortuna Hjørring won 5–1 on aggregate.

28 September 2011
18:00

Osijek (Croatia)	0–4	(Sweden) Göteborg
	Report	Sembrant 13', 71'; Liljegärd 20'; Ek 62'

Stadion Gradski vrt, Osijek
Attendance: 800
Referee: Anja Kunick (Germany)
6 October 2011
19:00

Göteborg (Sweden)	7–0	(Croatia) Osijek
Lindén 21', 51'; Ahlstrand 31'; Törnqvist 55', 87'; Almgren 71'; Dahlkvist 77'	Report

Walhalla Idrottsplats, Gothenburg
Attendance: 875
Referee: Simona Ghisletta (Switzerland)

Göteborg won 11–0 on aggregate.

28 September 2011
14:00

SShVSM-Kairat Almaty (Kazakhstan)	2–1	(Austria) Neulengbach
Aniskovtseva 41', 90+2'	Report	Burger 45+1'

Almaty Central Stadium, Almaty
Attendance: 1,800
Referee: Gordana Kuzmanović (Serbia)
5 October 2011
20:00

Neulengbach (Austria)	5–0	(Kazakhstan) SShVSM-Kairat Almaty
Gstöttner 33', 82'; Tasch 47'; Entner 66'; Giovana 88'	Report

Wienerwaldstadion, Neulengbach
Attendance: 850
Referee: Sofia Karagiorgi (Cyprus)

Neulengbach won 6–2 on aggregate.

29 September 2011
21:00

Tavagnacco (Italy)	2–1	(Sweden) Malmö
Riboldi 32'; Camporese 44'	Report	Fischer 89'

Stadio Comunale, Tavagnacco
Attendance: 948
Referee: Christine Baitinger (Germany)
6 October 2011
19:00

Malmö (Sweden)	5–0	(Italy) Tavagnacco
Gunnarsdóttir 13', 67'; Melis 21', 81'; Wilhelmsson 62'	Report

Malmö Idrottsplats, Malmö
Attendance: 830
Referee: Alexandra Ihringova (England)

Malmö won 6–2 on aggregate.

28 September 2011
19:00

Stabæk (Norway)	1–0	(Germany) Frankfurt
Dekkerhus 54'	Report

Nadderud Stadion, Bekkestua
Attendance: 693
Referee: Teodora Albon (Romania)
5 October 2011
15:00

Frankfurt (Germany)	4–1	(Norway) Stabæk
Bartusiak 6'; Smisek 37'; Landström 77'; Crnogorcevic 90'	Report	Moore 80'

Stadion am Brentanobad, Frankfurt
Attendance: 2,780
Referee: Jenny Palmqvist (Sweden)

Frankfurt won 4–2 on aggregate.

28 September 2011
20:45

Peamount United (Republic of Ireland)	0–2	(France) Paris Saint-Germain
	Report	Coton-Pélagie 72'; Thomas 90+3'

Tallaght Stadium, Dublin
Attendance: 2,109
Referee: Ausra Kance (Lithuania)
5 October 2011
17:00

Paris Saint-Germain (France)	3–0	(Republic of Ireland) Peamount United
Coton-Pélagie 49'; Debonne 66'; Dali 85'	Report

Stade Sébastien Charléty, Paris
Attendance: 1,956
Referee: Karolina Radzik-Johan (Poland)

Paris Saint-Germain won 5–0 on aggregate.

== Round of 16 ==
Team 1	Agg.	Team 2	1st leg	2nd leg
Sparta Prague (Czech Republic)	0–12^{1}	(France) Lyon	0–6	0–6
Brøndby (Denmark)	5–2	(Italy) Torres	2–1	3–1
Turbine Potsdam (Germany)	17–0	(Scotland) Glasgow City	10–0	7–0
Energy Voronezh (Russia)	3–7	(Russia) Rossiyanka	0–4	3–3
Rayo Vallecano (Spain)	2–6	(England) Arsenal	1–1	1–5
Fortuna Hjørring (Denmark)	2–4	(Sweden) Göteborg	0–1	2–3
Neulengbach (Austria)	1–4	(Sweden) Malmö	1–3	0–1
Frankfurt (Germany)	4–2	(France) Paris Saint-Germain	3–0	1–2

Note 1: Order of legs reversed after original draw.

3 November 2011
14:00

Sparta Prague (Czech Republic)	0–6	(France) Lyon
	Report	Schelin 21', 26'; Thomis 56'; Le Sommer 58', 85' (pen.); Franco 75'

Areál SK Aritma, Prague
Attendance: 394
Referee: Katalin Kulcsár (Hungary)
9 November 2011
19:00

Lyon (France)	6–0	(Czech Republic) Sparta Prague
Dickenmann 3'; Abily 46', 50'; Schelin 58'; Necib 66'; Georges 86'	Report

Stade de Gerland, Lyon
Attendance: 6,461
Referee: Esther Azzopardi (Malta)

Lyon won 12–0 on aggregate.

2 November 2011
18:30

Brøndby (Denmark)	2–1	(Italy) Torres
Munk 41', 82'	Report	Iannella 42'

Brøndby Stadium, Brøndby
Attendance: 1,704
Referee: Teodora Albon (Romania)
9 November 2011
20:15

Torres (Italy)	1–3	(Denmark) Brøndby
Fuselli 20'	Report	Bukh 27'; Munk 67'; Luik 79'

Vanni Sanna, Sassari
Attendance: 647
Referee: Jenny Palmqvist (Sweden)

Brøndby won 5–2 on aggregate.

2 November 2011
17:00

Turbine Potsdam (Germany)	10–0	(Scotland) Glasgow City
Añonma 2', 47'; Schmidt 15'; Mittag 25', 72', 75'; Nagasato 51', 55'; de Ridder 78'; McDonald 81' (o.g.)	Report

Karl-Liebknecht-Stadion, Potsdam
Attendance: 1,750
Referee: Esther Staubli (Switzerland)
10 November 2011
19:05

Glasgow City (Scotland)	0–7	(Germany) Turbine Potsdam
	Report	de Ridder 5', 41'; Mittag 10', 62'; Demann 20'; Draws 74'; I. Kerschowski 89'

Petershill Park, Glasgow
Attendance: 557
Referee: Cristina Dorcioman (Romania)

Turbine Potsdam won 17–0 on aggregate.

3 November 2011
17:00

Energy Voronezh (Russia)	0–4	(Russia) Rossiyanka
	Report	Jakobsson 44', 70', 81'; Chorna 68'

Tsentralnyi Profsoyuz Stadion, Voronezh
Attendance: 2,500
Referee: Gyöngyi Gaál (Hungary)
9 November 2011
17:00

Rossiyanka (Russia)	3–3	(Russia) Energy Voronezh
Cristiane 1', 40'; Morozova 10'	Report	Ogbiagbevha 36'; Terekhova 55'; Danilova 68'

Krasnoarmeysk Stadium, Krasnoarmeysk
Attendance: 360
Referee: Christine Baitinger (Germany)

Rossiyanka won 7–3 on aggregate.

3 November 2011
19:00

Rayo Vallecano (Spain)	1–1	(England) Arsenal
Natalia 31'	Report	Little 3'

Ciudad Deportiva Fundación Rayo Vallecano, Madrid
Attendance: 480
Referee: Jana Adámková (Czech Republic)
9 November 2011
15:00

Arsenal (England)	5–1	(Spain) Rayo Vallecano
Ludlow 16'; Little 55'; Yankey 62'; Nobbs 71'; Carter 74'	Report	Natalia 72'

Meadow Park, Borehamwood
Attendance: 323
Referee: Efthalia Mitsi (Greece)

Arsenal won 6–2 on aggregate.

2 November 2011
19:00

Fortuna Hjørring (Denmark)	0–1	(Sweden) Göteborg
	Report	Törnqvist 11'

Hjørring Stadion, Hjørring
Attendance: 1,038
Referee: Silvia Tea Spinelli (Italy)
10 November 2011
19:00

Göteborg (Sweden)	3–2	(Denmark) Fortuna Hjørring
Almgren 2'; Ek 66' (pen.); Stensland 74'	Report	Khamis 79'; Woods 88'

Walhalla Idrottsplats, Gothenburg
Attendance: 1,046
Referee: Kirsi Heikkinen (Finland)

Göteborg won 4–2 on aggregate.

2 November 2011
19:00

Neulengbach (Austria)	1–3	(Sweden) Malmö
Gstöttner 63'	Report	Gunnarsdóttir 6', 77'; Melis 17'

Wienerwaldstadion, Neulengbach
Attendance: 1,000
Referee: Kateryna Monzul (Ukraine)
10 November 2011
19:00

Malmö (Sweden)	1–0	(Austria) Neulengbach
Melis 23'	Report

Malmö Idrottsplats, Malmö
Attendance: 685
Referee: Bibiana Steinhaus (Germany)

Malmö won 4–1 on aggregate.

2 November 2011
14:15

Frankfurt (Germany)	3–0	(France) Paris Saint-Germain
Bajramaj 9'; Garefrekes 47'; Behringer 55'	Report

Stadion am Brentanobad, Frankfurt
Attendance: 2,610
Referee: Alexandra Ihringova (England)
9 November 2011
20:45

Paris Saint-Germain (France)	2–1	(Germany) Frankfurt
Long 45+1', 74'	Report	Crnogorčević 2'

Stade Sébastien Charléty, Paris
Attendance: 1,350
Referee: Christina W. Pedersen (Norway)

Frankfurt won 4–2 on aggregate.

== Quarter-finals ==
The draw for the quarterfinals was held on 17 November 2011. Matches were played on 14–15 March 2012 and 21–22 March 2012.

Team 1	Agg.	Team 2	1st leg	2nd leg
Lyon (France)	8–0	(Denmark) Brøndby	4–0	4–0
Turbine Potsdam (Germany)	5–0	(Russia) Rossiyanka	2–0	3–0
Arsenal (England)	3–2	(Sweden) Göteborg	3–1	0–1
Malmö (Sweden)	1–3	(Germany) Frankfurt	1–0	0–3

14 March 2012
19:00

Lyon (France)	4–0	(Denmark) Brøndby
Abily 8'; Bompastor 34'; Dickenmann 64'; Necib 71'	Report

Stade de Gerland, Lyon
Attendance: 9,985
Referee: Christine Baitinger (Germany)
21 March 2012
18:30

Brøndby (Denmark)	0–4	(France) Lyon
	Report	Abily 10'; Thomis 42'; Le Sommer 56', 82'

Brøndby Stadium, Brøndby
Attendance: 3,644
Referee: Efthalia Mitsi (Greece)

Lyon won 8–0 on aggregate.

14 March 2012
18:00

Turbine Potsdam (Germany)	2–0	(Russia) Rossiyanka
Hanebeck 24'; Peter 44' (pen.)	Report

Karl-Liebknecht-Stadion, Potsdam
Attendance: 2,120
Referee: Silvia Tea Spinelli (Italy)
22 March 2012
12:00

Rossiyanka (Russia)	0–3	(Germany) Turbine Potsdam
	Report	Chorna 40' (o.g.); Nagasato 45+1', 77'

Trud Stadium, Podolsk
Attendance: 5,350
Referee: Jenny Palmqvist (Sweden)

Turbine Potsdam won 5–0 on aggregate.

14 March 2012
15:30

Arsenal (England)	3–1	(Sweden) Göteborg
Nobbs 25'; Little 75' (pen.); White 82'	Report	Ek 10'

Meadow Park, Borehamwood
Attendance: 447
Referee: Teodora Albon (Romania)
21 March 2012
19:00

Göteborg (Sweden)	1–0	(England) Arsenal
Törnqvist 90'	Report

Valhalla IP, Gothenburg
Attendance: 2,150
Referee: Bibiana Steinhaus (Germany)

Arsenal won 3–2 on aggregate.

15 March 2012
17:00

Malmö (Sweden)	1–0	(Germany) Frankfurt
Gunnarsdóttir 25'	Report

Malmö IP, Malmö
Attendance: 1,169
Referee: Cristina Dorcioman (Romania)
21 March 2012
15:00

Frankfurt (Germany)	3–0	(Sweden) Malmö
Garefrekes 66', 90+1'; Chojnowski 89'	Report

Stadion am Brentanobad, Frankfurt
Attendance: 3,300
Referee: Esther Staubli (Switzerland)

Frankfurt won 3–1 on aggregate.

== Semi-finals ==
Team 1	Agg.	Team 2	1st leg	2nd leg
Lyon (France)	5–1	(Germany) Turbine Potsdam	5–1	0–0
Arsenal (England)	1–4	(Germany) Frankfurt	1–2	0–2

15 April 2012
18:00

Lyon (France)	5–1	(Germany) Turbine Potsdam
Henry 6'; Abily 20', 61'; Schelin 21'; Dickenmann 55'	Report	Schmidt 89'

Stade de Gerland, Lyon
Attendance: 12,800
Referee: Teodora Albon (Romania)
22 April 2012
14:00

Turbine Potsdam (Germany)	0–0	(France) Lyon
	Report

Karl-Liebknecht-Stadion, Potsdam
Attendance: 3,870
Referee: Christina W. Pedersen (Norway)

Lyon won 5–1 on aggregate.

15 April 2012
16:00

Arsenal (England)	1–2	(Germany) Frankfurt
Grant 69'	Report	Crnogorčević 64'; Garefrekes 90+3'

Meadow Park, Borehamwood
Attendance: 894
Referee: Silvia Tea Spinelli (Italy)
21 April 2012
14:15

Frankfurt (Germany)	2–0	(England) Arsenal
Marozsán 60'; Landström 85'	Report

Stadion am Brentanobad, Frankfurt
Attendance: 3,710
Referee: Kirsi Heikkinen (Finland)

Frankfurt won 4–1 on aggregate.

== Final ==
17 May 2012
18:00 CET

Lyon (France)	2–0	(Germany) Frankfurt
Le Sommer 15' (pen.); Abily 28'	Report

Olympiastadion, Munich
Attendance: 50,212
Referee: Jenny Palmqvist (Sweden)
