= Ahlstrand =

Ahlstrand is a surname. Notable people with the surname include:

- Anna Ahlstrand (born 1980), Swedish footballer
- Bruce Ahlstrand, Canadian academic
- Jonas Ahlstrand (born 1990), Swedish cyclist
- Linné Ahlstrand (1936–1967), American model and actress
