= 2011–12 UEFA Women's Champions League =

11th edition of the European women's club football championship organized by UEFA

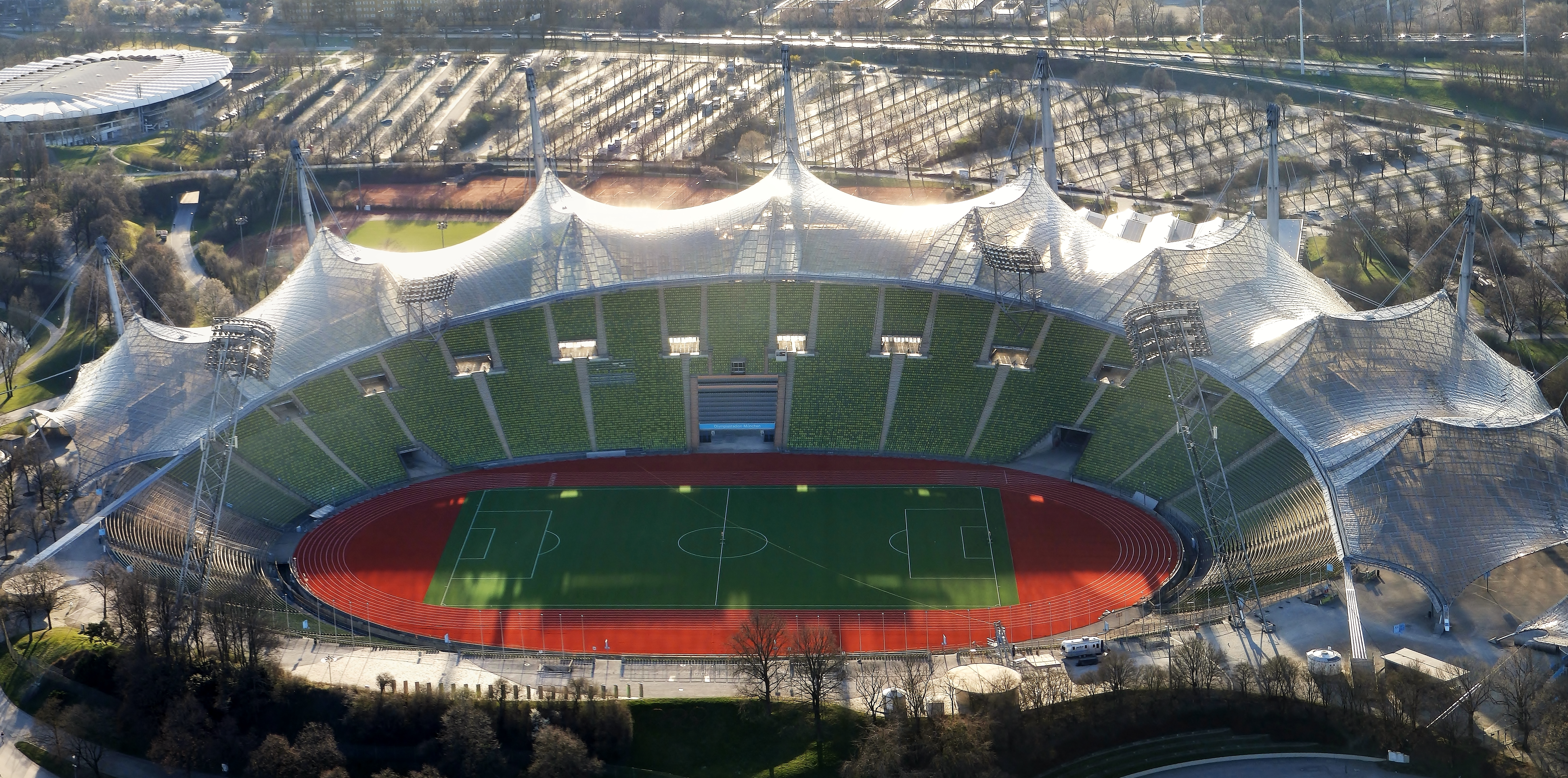
- The Olympiastadion in Munich hosted the final.

Tournament details
- Dates: 11 August 2011 to 17 May 2012
- Teams: 54

Final positions
- Champions: (France) Lyon (2nd title)
- Runners-up: (Germany) Frankfurt

Tournament statistics
- Top scorer(s): (France) Camille Abily (France) Eugénie Le Sommer; 9 goals each

The 2011–12 UEFA Women's Champions League was the eleventh edition of the European women's championship for football clubs. The final was held in the Olympiastadion in Munich, Germany on 17 May 2012.

As in the past two Champions League seasons, the eight highest ranked nations got two entries to the tournament. The point of entry was changed this season however. In the previous years the national runners-up had to enter the qualification round. With those teams always easing through their groups, with the exception of Umeå in 2010–11, UEFA decided to give those a direct entry to the round of 32. As a result, eight nations which under previous rules would have had direct entry to that round now had to go through the qualifying stage.

== Team allocation and distribution ==
A total of 54 teams from 46 UEFA associations were confirmed to be entering this year's competition by UEFA on 15 June 2011. This is a new record for the Women's Champions league, as Albania and Latvia are represented for the first time, and the winners of the Luxembourg league entered for the first time since 2001–02. In total 11 teams got their European debut. Countries are allocated places according to their 2010 UEFA league coefficient for women, taking into account performances in women's club competitions between 2005–06 and 2009–10.

Associations ranked 1–8 entered two clubs, the remaining associations entered one team. Unlike the men's Champions League, not every association have entered teams in the past, so the exact number of clubs in each round was only known shortly before the draw.

	Teams entering in this round	Teams advancing from previous round	Competition format
Qualifying round (32 teams)	32 domestic league winners from associations ranked 15–53		8 groups of 4 clubs, hosted by one club, seeded into four pots by UEFA club coefficient
Round of 32 (32 teams)	14 domestic league winners from associations 1–14; 8 domestic league runners-up from associations 1–8	8 group winners from qualifying round; 2 best group runners-up from qualifying round	Two-legged knockout, seeded by UEFA club coefficient

== Round and draw dates ==
UEFA has scheduled the competition as follows.

Round	Draw	First leg	Second leg
Qualifying round	23 June 2011	11–16 August 2011	
Round of 32	23 August 2011	28–29 September 2011	5–6 October 2011
Round of 16	23 August 2011	2–3 November 2011	9–10 November 2011
Quarterfinal	17 November 2011	14–15 March 2012	21–22 March 2012
Semifinal	17 November 2011	14–15 April 2012	21–22 April 2012
Final	17 November 2011	17 May 2012	

== Teams ==
Round of 32
(Germany) Turbine Potsdam (CH)	(Germany) Frankfurt (RU)	(Sweden) Malmö (CH)	(Sweden) Göteborg (RU)
(France) Lyon (CH)	(France) Paris Saint-Germain (RU)	(Russia) Rossiyanka (CH)	(Russia) Energy Voronezh (RU)
(England) Arsenal (CW)^{1}	(England) Bristol Academy (CR)	(Denmark) Brøndby (CH)	(Denmark) Fortuna Hjørring (RU)
(Italy) Torres (CH)	(Italy) Tavagnacco (RU)	(Iceland) Valur (CH)	(Iceland) Þór/KA (RU)
(Norway) Stabæk (CH)	(Austria) Neulengbach (CH)	(Czech Republic) Sparta Prague (CH)	(Netherlands) Twente (CH)
(Belgium) Standard Liège (CH)	(Kazakhstan) CSHVSM (CH)		
Qualifying round
(Spain) Rayo Vallecano (CH)	(Switzerland) YB Frauen (CH)	(Belarus) Bobruichanka (CH)	(Poland) Unia Racibórz (CH)
(Ukraine) Lehenda-ShVSM (CH)	(Finland) PK-35 Vantaa (CH)	(Hungary) MTK (CH)	(Bosnia and Herzegovina) SFK 2000 (CH)
(Greece) PAOK (CH)	(Portugal) 1° Dezembro (CH)	(Romania) Olimpia Cluj (CH)	(Scotland) Glasgow City (CH)
(Serbia) Spartak Subotica(CH)	(Bulgaria) NSA Sofia (CH)	(Israel) ASA Tel Aviv University (CH)	(Slovakia) Slovan Bratislava (CH)
(Lithuania) Gintra Universitetas (CH)	(Wales) Swansea City (CH)	(Slovenia) Krka (CH)	(Moldova) Goliador Chişinău (CH)
(Faroe Islands) KÍ Klaksvík (CH)	(Republic of Ireland) Peamount United (CW)	(Croatia) Osijek (CH)	(Cyprus) Apollon Limassol (CH)
(Northern Ireland) Newtownabbey Strikers (CH)	(North Macedonia) ZFK Nashe Taksi (CH)	(Estonia) Pärnu JK (CH)	(Turkey) Ataşehir Belediyesi (CH)
(Malta) Mosta (CH)	(Albania) Ada (CH)	(Latvia) Liepājas Metalurgs (CH)	(Luxembourg) Progrès Niedercorn (CH)

- ^{1} As the new English Super League did not start until May 2011, the FA decided to give their spots to the two finalists of the 2010–11 FA Women's Cup.
- CH denotes the national champion, RU the national runner-up, CW the cup-winner, CR losing cup finalist.

== Qualifying round ==
32 teams entered in the qualifying round, and were divided into eight groups of four teams, with one team from each seeding pot. Host countries won't be drawn together.

Groups were played as mini tournaments over a span of six days.

=== Group 1 ===
Pos	Team	Pld	W	D	L	GF	GA	GD	Pts	Qualification	YBF	NTA	PAOK	GOL
1	(Switzerland) YB Frauen	3	2	1	0	11	2	+9	7	Advance to main round	—	3–1	1–1	–
2	(North Macedonia) ZFK Naše Taksi (H)	3	2	0	1	8	3	+5	6		–	—	–	6–0
3	(Greece) PAOK	3	1	1	1	4	2	+2	4		–	0–1	—	3–0
4	(Moldova) Goliador Chişinău	3	0	0	3	0	16	−16	0		0–7	–	–	—

(H) Hosts

=== Group 2 ===
Pos	Team	Pld	W	D	L	GF	GA	GD	Pts	Qualification	ASA	DEZ	MTK	LIE
1	(Israel) ASA Tel Aviv University	3	2	1	0	6	2	+4	7	Advance to main round	—	–	1–0	–
2	(Portugal) 1° Dezembro (H)	3	1	2	0	5	1	+4	5		1–1	—	–	4–0
3	(Hungary) MTK	3	1	1	1	12	1	+11	4		–	0–0	—	12–0
4	(Latvia) Liepājas Metalurgs	3	0	0	3	1	20	−19	0		1–4	–	–	—

(H) Hosts

=== Group 3 ===
Pos	Team	Pld	W	D	L	GF	GA	GD	Pts	Qualification	RVA	PEA	PAR	KRK
1	(Spain) Rayo Vallecano	3	3	0	0	9	1	+8	9	Advance to main round	—	1–0	4–1	–
2	(Republic of Ireland) Peamount United	3	2	0	1	12	2	+10	6	Advance to main round	–	—	–	7–0
3	(Estonia) Pärnu JK	3	1	0	2	4	10	−6	3		–	1–5	—	–
4	(Slovenia) Krka (H)	3	0	0	3	1	13	−12	0		0–4	–	1–2	—

(H) Hosts

=== Group 4 ===
Pos	Team	Pld	W	D	L	GF	GA	GD	Pts	Qualification	CLU	2KS	ABE	GIN
1	(Romania) Olimpia Cluj	3	3	0	0	12	2	+10	9	Advance to main round	—	–	–	5–0
2	(Bosnia and Herzegovina) SFK 2000 (H)	3	2	0	1	7	5	+2	6		1–3	—	4–1	–
3	(Turkey) Ataşehir Belediyesi	3	0	1	2	3	9	−6	1		1–4	–	—	–
4	(Lithuania) Gintra Universitetas	3	0	1	2	2	8	−6	1		–	1–2	1–1	—

(H) Hosts

=== Group 5 ===
Pos	Team	Pld	W	D	L	GF	GA	GD	Pts	Qualification	GLA	SUB	KIK	MOS
1	(Scotland) Glasgow City	3	3	0	0	17	0	+17	9	Advance to main round	—	4–0	–	8–0
2	(Serbia) Spartak Subotica (H)	3	2	0	1	15	6	+9	6		–	—	4–2	–
3	(Faroe Islands) KÍ Klaksvík	3	1	0	2	3	9	−6	3		0–5	–	—	1–0
4	(Malta) Mosta	3	0	0	3	0	20	−20	0		–	0–11	–	—

(H) Hosts

=== Group 6 ===
Pos	Team	Pld	W	D	L	GF	GA	GD	Pts	Qualification	P35	SBR	UNR	ADA
1	(Finland) PK-35 Vantaa (H)	3	2	1	0	12	1	+11	7	Advance to main round	—	–	1–1	10–0
2	(Slovakia) Slovan Bratislava	3	2	0	1	17	1	+16	6		0–1	—	–	–
3	(Poland) Unia Racibórz	3	1	1	1	9	2	+7	4		–	0–1	—	8–0
4	(Albania) Ada	3	0	0	3	0	34	−34	0		–	0–16	–	—

(H) Hosts

=== Group 7 ===
Pos	Team	Pld	W	D	L	GF	GA	GD	Pts	Qualification	APL	LSH	SWA	PNI
1	(Cyprus) Apollon Limassol (H)	3	3	0	0	24	1	+23	9	Advance to main round	—	2–1	–	14–0
2	(Ukraine) Lehenda-ShVSM	3	2	0	1	11	2	+9	6		–	—	2–0	8–0
3	(Wales) Swansea City	3	1	0	2	4	10	−6	3		0–8	–	—	–
4	(Luxembourg) Progrès Niedercorn	3	0	0	3	0	26	−26	0		–	–	0–4	—

(H) Hosts

=== Group 8 ===
Pos	Team	Pld	W	D	L	GF	GA	GD	Pts	Qualification	OSI	BOB	NSA	CNS
1	(Croatia) Osijek (H)	3	2	1	0	7	2	+5	7	Advance to main round	—	1–0	–	–
2	(Belarus) Bobruichanka	3	2	0	1	10	1	+9	6	Advance to main round	–	—	3–0	7–0
3	(Bulgaria) NSA Sofia	3	1	1	1	2	4	−2	4		1–1	–	—	1–0
4	(Northern Ireland) Newtownabbey Strikers	3	0	0	3	1	13	−12	0		1–5	–	–	—

(H) Hosts

=== Ranking of group runners-up ===
The two best runners-up also qualify for the round of 32. The match against the fourth-placed team in the group does not count for the purposes of the runners-up table. The tie-breakers in this ranking are:

1. Higher number of points obtained
2. Superior goal difference
3. Higher number of goals scored
4. Higher number of club coefficient points
5. Fair play conduct in all group matches

Grp	Team	Pld	W	D	L	GF	GA	GD	Pts
3	(Republic of Ireland) Peamount United	2	1	0	1	5	2	+3	3
8	(Belarus) Bobruichanka	2	1	0	1	3	1	+2	3
4	(Bosnia and Herzegovina) SFK 2000 Sarajevo	2	1	0	1	5	4	+1	3
7	(Ukraine) Lehenda-ShVSM	2	1	0	1	3	2	+1	3
6	(Slovakia) Slovan Bratislava	2	1	0	1	1	1	0	3
1	(North Macedonia) ZFK Naše Taksi	2	1	0	1	2	3	−1	3
5	(Serbia) Spartak Subotica	2	1	0	1	4	6	−2	3
2	(Portugal) 1° Dezembro	2	0	2	0	1	1	0	2

Debutants Peamount and 2004–05 quarter-finalists Bobruichanka qualified for the round of 32 as best runners-up.

== Knockout phase ==
=== Bracket ===
As there were two draws, one for Round of 32 and 16 and another draw for the Quarter-finals to the final, the bracket has been created in retrospect.

Round of 32
(Cyprus) Apollon	2	1	3
(Czech Republic) Sparta Prague	2	2	4
(Romania) Olimpia Cluj	0	0	0
(France) Lyon	9	3	12
(Belgium) Standard Liège	0	4	4
(Denmark) Brøndby	2	3	5
(Israel) ASA Tel Aviv	0	2	2
(Italy) Torres	2	3	5
(Iceland) Þór/KA	0	2	2
(Germany) Turbine Potsdam	6	8	14
(Scotland) Glasgow City	1	3	4
(Iceland) Valur	1	0	1
(England) Bristol Academy	1	2	3
(Russia) Energiya Voronezh	1	4	5
(Netherlands) Twente	0	0	0
(Russia) Rossiyanka	2	1	3
(Finland) PK-35 Vantaa	1	0	1
(Spain) Rayo Vallecano	4	3	7
(Belarus) Bobruichanka	0	0	0
(England) Arsenal	4	6	10
(Switzerland) YB Frauen	0	1	1
(Denmark) Fortuna Hjørring	3	2	5
(Croatia) Osijek	0	0	0
(Sweden) Göteborg	4	7	11
(Kazakhstan) CSHVSM	2	0	2
(Austria) Neulengbach	1	5	6
(Italy) Tavagnacco	2	0	2
(Sweden) Malmö	1	5	6
(Norway) Stabæk	1	1	2
(Germany) Frankfurt	0	4	4
(Republic of Ireland) Peamount	0	0	0
(France) PSG	2	3	5

Round of 16
(Czech Republic) Sparta Prague	0	0	0
(France) Lyon	6	6	12
(Denmark) Brøndby	2	3	5
(Italy) Torres	1	1	2
(Germany) Turbine Potsdam	10	7	17
(Scotland) Glasgow City	0	0	0
(Russia) Energiya Voronezh	0	3	3
(Russia) Rossiyanka	4	3	7
(Spain) Rayo Vallecano	1	1	2
(England) Arsenal	1	5	6
(Denmark) Fortuna Hjørring	0	2	2
(Sweden) Göteborg	1	3	4
(Austria) Neulengbach	1	0	1
(Sweden) Malmö	3	1	4
(Germany) Frankfurt	3	1	4
(France) PSG	0	2	2

Quarter-finals
(France) Lyon	4	4	8
(Denmark) Brøndby	0	0	0
(Germany) Turbine Potsdam	2	3	5
(Russia) Rossiyanka	0	0	0
(England) Arsenal	3	0	3
(Sweden) Göteborg	1	1	2
(Sweden) Malmö	1	0	1
(Germany) Frankfurt	0	3	3

Semi-finals
(France) Lyon	5	0	5
(Germany) Turbine Potsdam	1	0	1
(England) Arsenal	1	0	1
(Germany) Frankfurt	2	2	4

Final
(France) Lyon	2
(Germany) Frankfurt	0

=== Round of 32 ===
Of the 32 teams that will participate in this round, 22 are directly qualified, and the last 10 qualify from the qualification groups above. Eight as group winners, and two as the best runners-up. When determining the best runners-up, matches against the fourth placed team in the group is not taken into account. 16 seeded teams will be drawn against 16 unseeded teams. The title holder is the number 1 seed all other are seeded by their UEFA coefficient. The following teams are qualified for the round of 32.

The round of 32 and round of 16 were drawn on 23 August 2011 at UEFA headquarters. In the round of 32 no teams from the same country could be drawn against each other, same with teams from the same qualifying group. A change made to last year, when Breiðablik UBK and FCF Juvisy met in qualifying and the round of 32. There are no restrictions to the round of 16. Seeded teams play their second leg at home.

Team 1	Agg.	Team 2	1st leg	2nd leg
Apollon Limassol (Cyprus)	3–4	(Czech Republic) Sparta Prague	2–2	1–2
Olimpia Cluj (Romania)	0–12	(France) Lyon	0–9	0–3
Standard Liège (Belgium)	4–5	(Denmark) Brøndby	0–2	4–3
ASA Tel Aviv University (Israel)	2–5	(Italy) Torres	0–2	2–3
Þór/KA (Iceland)	2–14	(Germany) Turbine Potsdam	0–6	2–8
Glasgow City (Scotland)	4–1	(Iceland) Valur	1–1	3–0
Bristol Academy (England)	3–5	(Russia) Energiya Voronezh	1–1	2–4
Twente (Netherlands)	0–3	(Russia) Rossiyanka	0–2	0–1
PK-35 Vantaa (Finland)	1–7	(Spain) Rayo Vallecano	1–4	0–3
Bobruichanka (Belarus)	0–10	(England) Arsenal	0–4	0–6
YB Frauen (Switzerland)	1–5	(Denmark) Fortuna Hjørring	0–3	1–2
Osijek (Croatia)	0–11	(Sweden) Göteborg	0–4	0–7
CSHVSM (Kazakhstan)	2–6	(Austria) Neulengbach	2–1	0–5
Tavagnacco (Italy)	2–6	(Sweden) Malmö	2–1	0–5
Stabæk (Norway)	2–4	(Germany) Frankfurt	1–0	1–4
Peamount United (Republic of Ireland)	0–5	(France) Paris Saint-Germain	0–2	0–3

=== Round of 16 ===
Team 1	Agg.	Team 2	1st leg	2nd leg
Sparta Prague (Czech Republic)	0–12^{1}	(France) Lyon	0–6	0–6
Brøndby (Denmark)	5–2	(Italy) Torres	2–1	3–1
Turbine Potsdam (Germany)	17–0	(Scotland) Glasgow City	10–0	7–0
Energy Voronezh (Russia)	3–7	(Russia) Rossiyanka	0–4	3–3
Rayo Vallecano (Spain)	2–6	(England) Arsenal	1–1	1–5
Fortuna Hjørring (Denmark)	2–4	(Sweden) Göteborg	0–1	2–3
Neulengbach (Austria)	1–4	(Sweden) Malmö	1–3	0–1
Frankfurt (Germany)	4–2	(France) Paris Saint-Germain	3–0	1–2

Note 1: Order of legs reversed after original draw.

=== Quarter-finals ===
The draw for the quarterfinals was held on 17 November 2011. Matches were played on 14–15 March 2012 and 21–22 March 2012.

Team 1	Agg.	Team 2	1st leg	2nd leg
Lyon (France)	8–0	(Denmark) Brøndby	4–0	4–0
Turbine Potsdam (Germany)	5–0	(Russia) Rossiyanka	2–0	3–0
Arsenal (England)	3–2	(Sweden) Göteborg	3–1	0–1
Malmö (Sweden)	1–3	(Germany) Frankfurt	1–0	0–3

=== Semi-finals ===
Team 1	Agg.	Team 2	1st leg	2nd leg
Lyon (France)	5–1	(Germany) Turbine Potsdam	5–1	0–0
Arsenal (England)	1–4	(Germany) Frankfurt	1–2	0–2

=== Final ===
17 May 2012
18:00 CET

Lyon (France)	2–0	(Germany) Frankfurt
Le Sommer 15' (pen.); Abily 28'	Report

Olympiastadion, Munich
Attendance: 50,212
Referee: Jenny Palmqvist (Sweden)

=== Top goalscorers ===
Rank	Name	Team	Goals	Minutes played
1	(France) Eugénie Le Sommer	(France) Lyon	9	609'
1	(France) Camille Abily	(France) Lyon	9	659'
3	(Germany) Anja Mittag	(Germany) Turbine Potsdam	7	360'
3	(Japan) Yuki Nagasato	(Germany) Turbine Potsdam	7	532'
5	(Denmark) Lise Munk	(Denmark) Brøndby	6	448'
6	(Iceland) Sara Björk Gunnarsdóttir	(Sweden) LdB Malmö	5	532'
6	(Sweden) Lotta Schelin	(France) Lyon	5	587'
8	(Spain) Natalia	(Spain) Rayo Vallecano	4	313'
8	(Netherlands) Manon Melis	(Sweden) LdB Malmö	4	328'
8	(England) Jordan Nobbs	(England) Arsenal	4	377'
8	(Sweden) Sofia Jakobsson	(Russia) Rossiyanka	4	444'
8	(Brazil) Cristiane	(Russia) Rossiyanka	4	519'
8	(Sweden) Jane Törnqvist	(Sweden) Göteborg	4	540'
8	(Germany) Kerstin Garefrekes	(Germany) Frankfurt	4	810'
