= PK-35 Vantaa =

PK-35 Vantaa may refer to:

- PK-35 Vantaa (women), a Finnish women's football club in the Kansallinen Liiga
- PK-35 Vantaa (men), a former Finnish men's football team (2008–2016)
