= Pirjo Leppikangas =

Finnish footballer (born 1987)

Personal information
- Full name: Pirjo Elise Leppikangas
- Date of birth: September 12, 1987 (age 39)
- Height: 5 ft 6 in (1.68 m)
- Position: Defender

Team information
- Current team: PK-35 Vantaa
- Number: 2

Youth career
- 2010: Campbell Fighting Lady Camels

Senior career*
Years	Team	Apps	(Gls)
2007–2016	PK-35 Vantaa	108	(2)

International career^{‡}
2013–	Finland	2	(0)
- * Club domestic league appearances and goals as of 1 May 2020 ‡ National team caps and goals as of 31 August 2014

Pirjo Elise Leppikangas (born 12 September 1987) is a Finnish football defender. She plays for PK-35 Vantaa in the Naisten Liiga.

== Club career ==
Leppikangas has played for PK-35 Vantaa since their second division days and is their captain. In 2010, she played varsity soccer for Campbell Fighting Camels.

== International career ==
She was called up to be part of the national team for the UEFA Women's Euro 2013.

== Honours ==
=== Club ===
PK-35 Vantaa

Winner

- Naisten Liiga: 2010, 2011, 2012
- Finnish Women's Cup: 2010
