= Bruce Ahlstrand =

Canadian businessman

Bruce Ahlstrand is a senior faculty member in the Business Administration program at Trent University in Peterborough, Ontario. A graduate of the University of Toronto, the London School of Economics and University of Oxford, Ahlstrand has been contributing to the field of strategic management for many years. With Henry Mintzberg and Joseph Lampel, he wrote the book Strategy Safari. At Trent University, Ahlstrand teaches courses in Organization Theory (AD 251) and Strategic Management (AD 400) which are both part of the core program in management studies at Trent.

== Publications ==
Ahlstrand's international bestselling book Strategy Safari: A Guided Tour Through the Wilds of Strategic Management is widely considered a classic work in the field. It has been translated into more than 15 languages, including, Chinese, Russian and French, and has been used in MBA programs around the world. His highest cited publication is Strategy Safari, according to Google Scholar.
