= Irina Tretyakova =

Belarusian footballer

Personal information
- Date of birth: 5 May 1987 (age 39)
- Place of birth: Mogilev, Soviet Union (now Belarus)
- Height: 1.58 m (5 ft 2 in)
- Position: Forward

Team information
- Current team: Dnepr Mogilev

Senior career*
Years	Team	Apps	(Gls)
- Universitet
–2015	Bobruichanka	115+	(39+)
2016	Zorka-BDU	16	(4)
2017–2018	Bobruichanka	22	(3)
2020–	Dnepr Mogilev	0	(0)

International career^{‡}
	Belarus U19	9	(2)
2011–2016	Belarus	8	(0)
- * Club domestic league appearances and goals as of 1 July 2018 ‡ National team caps and goals as of 12 April 2016

Irina Tretyakova (born 5 May 1987) is a Belarusian footballer who plays as a forward for Belarusian Premier League club FC Dnepr Mogilev. She has been a member of the Belarus women's national team.
