= Lisa Ek =

Swedish former football midfielder (born 1982)

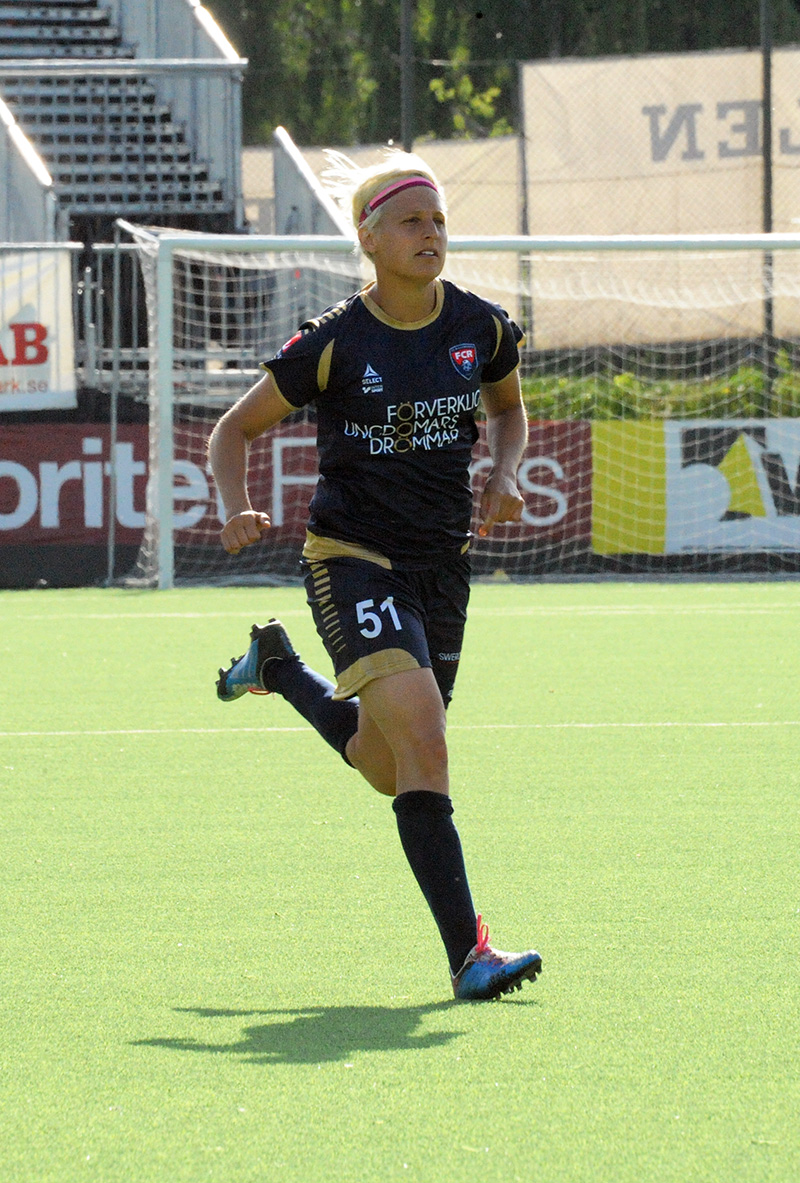
- Ek in May 2014

Personal information
- Full name: Lisa Ek
- Date of birth: 15 September 1982 (age 44)
- Place of birth: Sweden
- Height: 1.68 m (5 ft 6 in)
- Position: Midfielder

Youth career
- Barkarby SK

Senior career*
Years	Team	Apps	(Gls)
1996–1998	Vasalund		
1999–2002	AIK		
2003–2004	Hammarby		
2005–2012	Kopparbergs/Göteborg FC	118	(20)
2012–2014	FC Rosengård	13	(0)
2014–2015	Kopparbergs/Göteborg FC	16	(2)
2015–2016	Fiorentina	21	(1)
- * Club domestic league appearances and goals as of 15 November 2016

Lisa Ek (born 15 September 1982) is a Swedish former football midfielder who last played for Fiorentina. She has also played for AIK Fotboll, Hammarby IF, FC Rosengård and Kopparbergs/Göteborg FC of the Damallsvenskan. The 2011-12 season marked her Champions League debut.

In September 2012 Ek suffered an anterior cruciate ligament injury, ruling her out of action for at least six months.

Ek has been an under-19 international. She is also an accomplished bandy and ice hockey player. In 2013 her partner was male lower division footballer Per Broberg.

Ek retired from football in 2016, after spending a season in Italy playing for Fiorentina. She intended to remain in Italy having become romantically attached to an Italian boyfriend. She attended UEFA Women's Euro 2017 as a pundit for Sveriges Television, where she attracted notice for her dyed-blue hairstyle.

Ek currently works as an Agent for the global football agency CMG, representing players and coaches within women's football.
