= Viktorija Budrytė-Winnersjo =

Lithuanian footballer

Viktorija Budrytė
Personal information
- Full name: Viktorija Budrytė-Winnersjo
- Birth name: Viktorija Budrytė
- Date of birth: 12 October 1989 (age 37)
- Place of birth: Plungė, Soviet Union (now Lithuania)
- Position: Forward

Senior career*
Years	Team	Apps	(Gls)
2005–2014	Gintra Universitetas		
2012	→Roslagsbro IF (loan)		
2013	→Roslagsbro IF (loan)		
2014	→Roslagsbro IF (loan)		

International career^{‡}
2005–2007	Lithuania U19	6	(0)
2006–2017	Lithuania	13	(0)
- * Club domestic league appearances and goals ‡ National team caps and goals as of 8 February 2017

Viktorija Budrytė-Winnersjo (née Budrytė; born 12 October 1989), known as Viktorija Budrytė, is a Lithuanian former footballer who played as a forward. She has been a member of the Lithuania women's national team.

She has degree of Plungės „Ryto“ pagrindinė mokykla and Sport class of Šiauliai „Vijolių“ vidurinė mokykla. Her first football trainer was Romaldas Kerpa and second trainer was Rimantas Viktoravičius.

== Personal life ==
In July 2017 Budrytė married her wife Marina Melody Winnersjo in Sweden.

Her mother Vitalija Budrienė lives in England. Viktorija ha four brothers and four sisters. They are Marius, Renatas, Laimonas, Mantas, Ina, Dovilė, Vaida and Vilija.
