= Sandra Braz =

Portuguese football referee

- Full name: Sandra Braz Bastos
- Born: 1 March 1978 (age 48); Portugal

International
Years	League	Role

Sandra Braz Bastos (born 1 March 1978) is an international football referee from Portugal. She is an official at the 2019 FIFA Women's World Cup in France.
