= Anna Ahlstrand =

Swedish footballer (born 1980)

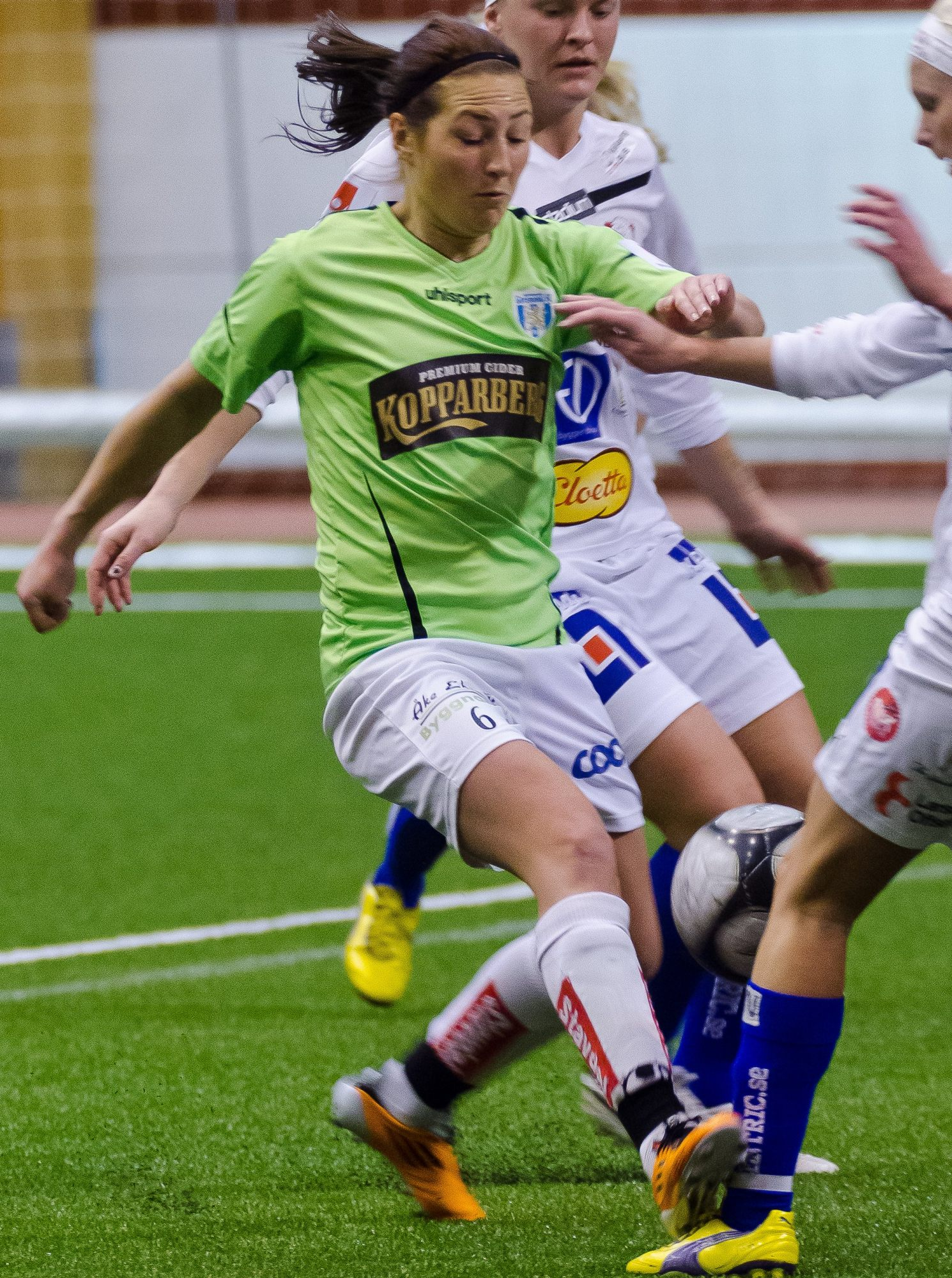

Personal information
- Full name: Anna Maria Ahlstrand
- Date of birth: 24 August 1980 (age 46)
- Place of birth: Lidköpingsvägen, Sweden
- Height: 1.68 m (5 ft 6 in)
- Position: Midfielder

Senior career*
Years	Team	Apps	(Gls)
1998	Falköpings KIK		
1999–2002	Holmalunds IF		
2002–2005	Göteborg FC		
2006–2008	IK Gauthiod		
2009–2016	Göteborg FC	115	(10)
- * Club domestic league appearances and goals as of 23:17, 20 July 2015 (UTC)

Anna Maria Ahlstrand (born 24 August 1980) is a Swedish football midfielder, who played for Göteborg FC in Sweden's Damallsvenskan.

== Career ==
285 matches for Göteborg
