= Efthalia Mitsi =

Greek football referee

Efthalia Mitsi (Greek: Θάλεια Μήτση; born 3 March 1980) is a Greek football referee.
