= Jenae Seppälä =

American soccer player

Personal information
- Full name: Jenae Zillgitt Seppälä
- Date of birth: January 13, 1986 (age 40)
- Place of birth: San Diego, California, United States
- Height: 5 ft 9 in (1.75 m)
- Position: Defender

College career
Years	Team	Apps	(Gls)
2004–2005	San Diego State Aztecs	3	(0)
2005–2008	Fullerton Titans		

Senior career*
Years	Team	Apps	(Gls)
2009–2011	PK-35 Vantaa	48	(9)
- * Club domestic league appearances and goals

Jenae Zillgitt Seppälä (née Gibbens; born January 13, 1986) is an American soccer defender who played for PK-35 Vantaa in Finland's Naisten Liiga (renamed Kansallinen Liiga in 2020) and the UEFA Women's Champions League. She was a two time Finnish Champion with PK-35 Vantaa. Seppälä's college career was played with the San Diego State Aztecs and the Fullerton Titans.
