= Lise Munk =

Danish footballer (born 1989)

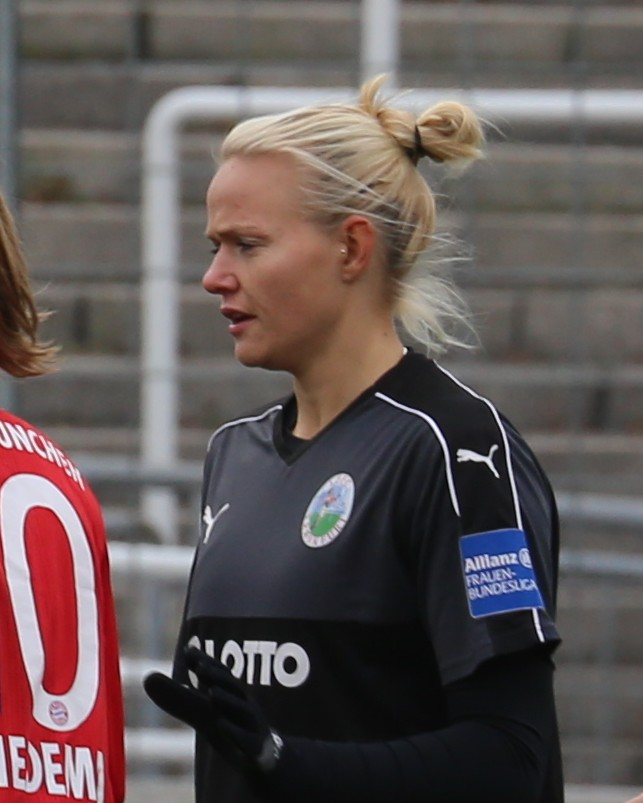

Personal information
- Full name: Lise Overgaard-Munk
- Date of birth: 26 May 1989 (age 37)
- Place of birth: Frederikshavn, Denmark
- Height: 1.76 m (5 ft 9 in)
- Position: Striker

Team information
- Current team: 1.FFC Frankfurt
- Number: 24

Youth career
- 1994–2002: Frederikshavn fI
- 2002–2006: Fortuna Hjørring

Senior career*
Years	Team	Apps	(Gls)
2006–2011	Fortuna Hjørring		
2011–2012	Brøndby IF		
2012–2014	1.FFC Frankfurt	6	(2)
2014–2016	1.FC Köln	10	(16)
2016–	1.FFC Frankfurt	35	(6)

International career^{‡}
2009–	Denmark	39	(5)
- * Club domestic league appearances and goals as of 21:04, 7 December 2014 (UTC) ‡ National team caps and goals as of 21 May 2017

Lise Overgaard-Munk (born 26 May 1989) is a Danish football striker who plays for 1.FFC Frankfurt of the German Frauen-Bundesliga. She has previously played in the top Bundesliga with 1.FFC Frankfurt and for Danish Elitedivisionen teams Fortuna Hjørring and Brøndby IF. She has also represented the Denmark women's national football team.

== Club career ==
In the early part of her career Munk represented both Fortuna Hjørring and Brøndby in the UEFA Women's Champions League.

After scoring 28 goals for Brøndby during the 2012 calendar year, Munk secured a transfer to 1.FFC Frankfurt in January 2013. She scored two goals in six appearances but missed the entire 2013–14 season through injury and asked to be released from her contract a year early before 2014–15. By then she had recovered her fitness and was in search of regular first team football. The following day she was unveiled as a 1. FC Köln player.

== International career ==
Munk scored a hat-trick in her senior Danish national team debut, a 15–0 home win over Georgia in October 2009.
