= PK-35 Vantaa (women) =

Finnish football club

- Full name: PK-35 Vantaa
- Founded: as Pallokerho-35, 1978 as PK-35 Vantaa, 2008
- Ground: Myyrmäen jalkapallostadion Myyrmäki, Vantaa, Finland
- Capacity: 4,700
- Coordinates: 60°15.726′N 24°50.291′E
- Chairman: Annukka Saine-Kottonen
- Manager: Kai Björkqvist
- Coach: Jari Väisänen
- League: Kansallinen Liiga
- 2025: 5th
Home colours	Away colours

PK-35 Vantaa (formerly Pallokerho-35 or PK-35) is a football club based in Vantaa, Finland. The club is "dedicated to women's football" and its representative team plays in the Kansallinen Liiga, the top-tier women's league in Finland (called the Naisten Liiga, 2006–2019). PK-35 Vantaa has won the Finnish Championship six times and the Finnish Women's Cup four times. The club's home ground is the Myyrmäen jalkapallostadion (Myyrmäki Football Stadium) in the Myyrmäki district of Vantaa.

The club had a men's representative team from 2008 until 2016, which last played in the 2016 season of the Veikkausliiga before bankruptcy.

== History ==
=== Club origins ===
The club's founding can be traced to 19 September 1935, when a group of 36 footballers gathered in Vyborg, which was part of Finland at that time, to establish Vyborg Ball Club (ViPK). The club remained in operation until 1939, when the Winter War and World War II forced the club to disband. Many club members resettled in Helsinki in the period during and after the wars and, in 1948, the club was reinstated in Helsinki under the new name, Pallokerho-35 (PK-35).

=== PK-35 Women's team ===
PK-35 women's representative team was established in 1978 and it first appeared in a Football Association of Finland league in 1982. In 1992, the team reached the qualifiers for the second-flight Naisten I-divisoona (renamed Naisten Ykkönen in 1996) but did not qualify for the league at that time. The team played in the Naisten Ykkönen during the 1999 season and in the third-tier Naisten Kakkonen during 2003–2007. At the end of the 2007 season, under head coach Mitri Pakkanen, the team gained promotion to the Ykkönen. PK-35 finished the 2008 season fourth in the Ykkönen.

=== Move to Vantaa ===
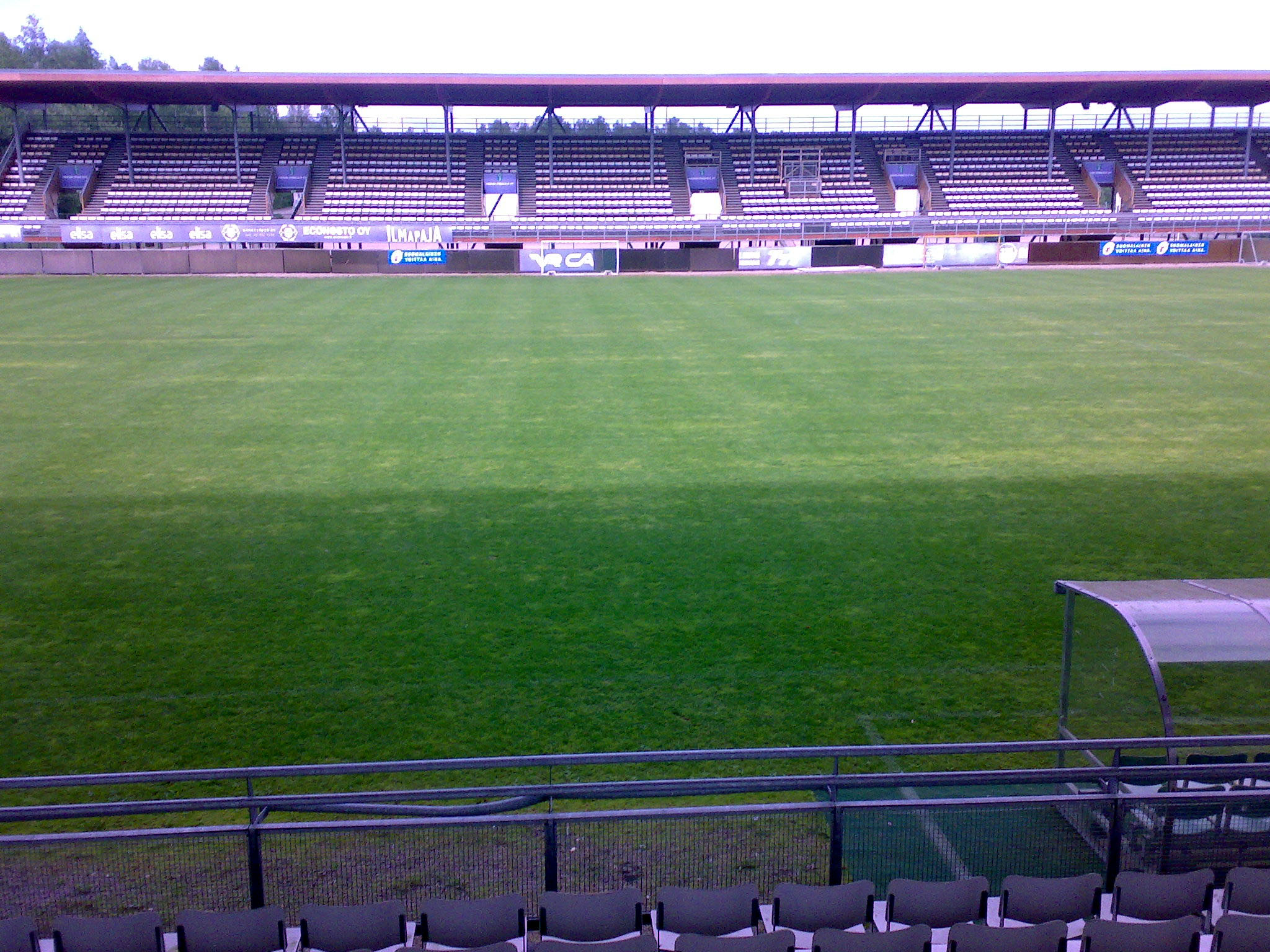
Myyrmäki stadion

At the end of the 2008 season, the PK-35 men’s and women’s representative teams were relocated to Vantaa, where they became the representative teams of the newly created club, PK-35 Vantaa. The transfer was done in the hope that the teams would have access to better resources in Vantaa. However, junior and representative team activities carried on in Helsinki and the Helsinki-based PK-35 women’s team continued in the fourth-tier Naisten Kolmonen.

=== Promotion to Naisten Liiga ===
In the 2009 season, the primary goal for the women’s team was to gain promotion to the top-tier Naisten Liiga (renamed the Kansallinen Liiga (National League) in 2020). Newly appointed head coach Pauliina Miettinen took charge of a squad bolstered by strong international players, featuring Ifeanyi Chiejine and goalkeeper Rachael Ayegba of Nigeria, and Jenae Seppälä (née Gibbens) and Natalie Capuano of the United States, as weil as promising young Finnish talent, including Pirjo Leppikangas, Aino Lehtinen, and Sanna Saarinen. The club‘s efforts paid off and PK-35 Vantaa beat FC Sport Vaasa to claim first place in the 2009 Naisten Ykkönen, earning promotion for the upcoming Naisten Liiga season.

The team won the Naisten Liiga for the first time in 2010, in their debut season in the championship. They thus made their UEFA Champions League debut in the 2011–12 season, where they were knocked out by Rayo Vallecano Femenino in the Round of 32.

PK-35 subsequently consolidated itself as the new leading Finnish team, winning both the league championship and the Finnish Women's Cup in 2011, 2012, and 2016.

Though PK-35 has been a successful team in their own series, they have lost multiple times against boys youth teams, most recently a 3-2 loss against the U14 HJK/Blues team.

== Honours ==
=== Titles ===
- Finnish Champions (7): 2010, 2011, 2012, 2014, 2015, 2016, 2018
- Finnish Women's Cup (4): 2011, 2012, 2013, 2016

=== UEFA competition record ===
Season	Competition	Stage	Opponent	Result
2011–12	Champions League	Qualifying round	(Albania) Ada Velipojë	10–0
2011–12	Champions League	Qualifying round	(Slovakia) Slovan Bratislava	1–0
2011–12	Champions League	Qualifying round	(Poland) Unia Racibórz	1–1
2011–12	Champions League	Round of 32	(Spain) Rayo Vallecano	1–4, 0–3
2012–13	Champions League	Qualifying round	(Moldova) Noroc Nimoreni	6–0
2012–13	Champions League	Qualifying round	(Croatia) ŽNK Osijek	3–1
2012–13	Champions League	Qualifying round	(Scotland) Glasgow City	1–1
2012–13	Champions League	Round of 32	(France) Olympique Lyon	0–7, 0–5
2013–14	Champions League	Qualifying round	(North Macedonia) Biljanini Izvori	13–1
2013–14	Champions League	Qualifying round	(Estonia) Pärnu JK	0–0
2013–14	Champions League	Qualifying round	(Greece) PAOK	2–1
2013–14	Champions League	Round of 32	(England) Birmingham City	0–3, 0–1
2015–16	Champions League	Qualifying round	(Slovakia) Nové Zámky	9–0
2015–16	Champions League	Qualifying round	(Latvia) Rīgas FS	9–0
2015–16	Champions League	Qualifying round	(Ukraine) Zhytlobud Kharkiv	2–1
2015–16	Champions League	Round of 32	(Sweden) FC Rosengård	0–2, 0–7

== Players ==
=== 2022 squad ===
Note: Flags indicate national team as defined under FIFA eligibility rules; some limited exceptions apply. Players may hold more than one non-FIFA nationality.

No.	Pos.	Nation	Player
1	GK	FIN	Velma Oikarinen
4	DF	FIN	Fillipa Kilponen
5	MF	FIN	Eerika Appleqvist
6	DF	FIN	Emmi Mäensivu
7	MF	FIN	Vilma Hakala
8	FW	FIN	Reetta Suomela
9	FW	FIN	Netta Koso
10	FW	FIN	Wilma Forsblom
11	FW	FIN	Elina Mankki
12	GK	FIN	Irea Virtanen Espejo
13	FW	FIN	Sanna Saarinen
14	DF	FIN	Elina Salmi
15	FW	FIN	Karolina Autio

No.	Pos.	Nation	Player
16	DF	FIN	Selina Mustajoki
18	MF	FIN	Ella Hopponen
19	DF	FIN	Anna Vlasoff
21	MF	FIN	Tia-Maria Jaakonsaari
22	FW	FIN	Aurora Troberg
23	MF	FIN	Rosa-Tuulia Mikkola
25	DF	FIN	Tia Painilainen
26	DF	FIN	Roosa Toivanen
28	MF	FIN	Roosa Bröijer
29	FW	FIN	Ella Koivu
31	GK	FIN	Sanni Solehmainen

=== Former internationals ===
- Colombia: Lady Andrade
- Finland: Jaana Lyytikäinen
- New Zealand: Emma Kete
- Nigeria: Cynthia Uwak
